= 2018 Quetta Gladiators season =

Overview of Quetta Gladiators in 2018

Quetta Gladiators
2018 season
- Coach: Moin Khan
- Captain: Sarfraz Ahmed
- PSL 2018: Playoffs (4th)
- Most runs: Shane Watson (319)
- Most wickets: Rahat Ali (15)

The Quetta Gladiators is a franchise cricket team that represents Quetta in the Pakistan Super League. They were one of the six teams that competed in 2018 Pakistan Super League. The team has been coached by Moin Khan and captained by Sarfaraz Ahmed.

== Squad ==
- Players with international caps are listed in **bold**.
- Ages are given as of the first match of the season, 22 February 2018

No.	Name	Nationality	Birth date	Batting style	Bowling style	Year signed	Notes
Batsmen
5	Saud Shakeel	Pakistan	5 September 1995 (aged 22)	Left-handed	Left-arm orthodox	2018	
8	Saad Ali	Pakistan	5 October 1994 (aged 23)	Left-handed	Right-arm medium	2018	
9	**Rameez Raja**	Pakistan	31 July 1987 (aged 30)	Right-handed	Right-arm off break	2018	
10	**Rilee Rossouw**	South Africa	9 October 1989 (aged 28)	Left-handed	Right-arm off break	2018	Overseas
20	**Jason Roy**	England	21 July 1990 (aged 27)	Right-handed	Right-arm medium	2018	Overseas
24	**Kevin Pietersen**	England	27 June 1980 (aged 37)	Right-handed	Right-arm off break	2018	Overseas
32	Tom Kohler-Cadmore	England	19 August 1994 (aged 23)	Right-handed	Right-arm off spin	2018	Replacement signing; Overseas
81	**Asad Shafiq**	Pakistan	28 January 1986 (aged 32)	Right-handed	Right-arm off break	2018	
All-rounders
1	**John Hastings**	Australia	4 November 1985 (aged 32)	Right-handed	Right-arm fast-medium	2018	Overseas
21	**Mohammad Nawaz**	Pakistan	21 March 1994 (aged 23)	Right-handed	Slow left-arm orthodox	2018	
22	Jofra Archer	England	1 April 1995 (aged 22)	Right-handed	Right-arm fast-medium	2018	Overseas
26	**Carlos Brathwaite**	West Indies	18 July 1988 (aged 29)	Right-handed	Right-arm fast-medium	2018	Overseas
30	**Mahmudullah**	Bangladesh	4 February 1986 (aged 32)	Right-handed	Right-arm off spin	2018	Overseas
33	**Shane Watson**	Australia	17 June 1981 (aged 36)	Right-handed	Right-arm fast-medium	2018	Overseas
48	**Anwar Ali**	Pakistan	25 November 1987 (aged 30)	Right-handed	Right-arm fast-medium	2018	
84	**Umar Amin**	Pakistan	16 October 1989 (aged 28)	Left-handed	Right-arm medium	2018	
Wicket-keepers
45	Azam Khan	Pakistan	10 August 1998 (aged 19)	Left-handed	—	2018	
54	**Sarfraz Ahmed**	Pakistan	22 May 1987 (aged 30)	Right-handed	—	2018	Captain
Bowlers
4	Faraz Ahmed	Pakistan	16 October 1984 (aged 33)	Right-handed	Slow left-arm orthodox	2018	
16	Hasan Khan	Pakistan	16 October 1998 (aged 19)	Right-handed	Slow left-arm orthodox	2018	
19	**Rashid Khan**	Afghanistan	20 September 1998 (aged 19)	Right-handed	Right-arm leg-break	2018	Overseas
55	**Ben Laughlin**	Australia	3 October 1982 (aged 35)	Right-handed	Right-arm fast-medium	2018	Overseas
66	Mir Hamza	Pakistan	10 November 1992 (aged 25)	Right-handed	Left-arm medium-fast	2018	
90	**Rahat Ali**	Pakistan	12 September 1988 (aged 29)	Right-handed	Left-arm medium-fast	2018	
100	Chris Green	Australia	1 October 1993 (aged 24)	Right-handed	Right-arm off break	2018	

== Kit manufacturers and sponsors ==
Shirt sponsor (chest)	Shirt sponsor (back)	Chest branding	Sleeve branding
Engro	Olpers	Master Oil	Engro Foods

Playing kit

== Teams standings ==
=== Points table ===
Pos	Team	Pld	W	L	NR	Pts	NRR
1	Islamabad United (C)	10	7	3	0	14	0.296
2	Karachi Kings (3rd)	10	5	4	1	11	0.028
3	Peshawar Zalmi (R)	10	5	5	0	10	0.464
4	Quetta Gladiators (4th)	10	5	5	0	10	0.312
5	Multan Sultans	10	4	5	1	9	−0.191
6	Lahore Qalandars	10	3	7	0	6	−0.931

Source: ESPNcricinfo
- The top 4 teams qualified for the playoffs
- Advanced to Qualifier
- Advanced to Eliminator 1

== League fixtures ==
23 February 2018
16:30 (D/N)
Scorecard

Karachi Kings; 149/9 (20 overs)	v	Quetta Gladiators; 130/9 (20 overs)
Colin Ingram 41 (21); Shane Watson 3/22 (4 overs)		Umar Amin 31 (31); Imad Wasim 2/19 (4 overs)

Karachi won by 19 runs
Dubai International Cricket Stadium, Dubai
Umpires: Ranmore Martinesz (SL) and Rashid Riaz (Pak)
Player of the match: Colin Ingram (Karachi Kings)

- Karachi Kings won the toss and elected to bat.

24 February
21:00
Scorecard

Lahore Qalandars; 119/9 (20 overs)	v	Quetta Gladiators; 120/1 (14 overs)
Brendon McCullum 30 (18); Jofra Archer 3/23 (4 overs)		Shane Watson 66 (42); Sunil Narine 1/40 (4 overs)

Quetta won by 9 wickets
Dubai International Cricket Stadium, Dubai
Umpires: Asif Yaqoob (Pak) and Tim Robinson (Eng)
Player of the match: Mohammad Nawaz (Quetta Gladiators)

- Quetta Gladiators won the toss and elected to field.

28 February
21:00
Scorecard

Islamabad United; 134/7 (20 overs)	v	Quetta Gladiators; 135/4 (17.1 overs)
Luke Ronchi 43 (26); Hasan Khan 1/12 (2 overs)		Kevin Pietersen 48 (34); Steven Finn 3/35 (4 overs)

Quetta won by 6 wickets
Sharjah Cricket Stadium, Sharjah
Umpires: Tim Robinson (Eng) and Ranmore Martinesz (SL)
Player of the match: Kevin Pietersen (Quetta Gladiators)

- Quetta Gladiators won the toss and elected to field.

1 March
21:00
Scorecard

Quetta Gladiators; 141/8 (20 overs)	v	Peshawar Zalmi; 143/5 (19.4 overs)
Shane Watson 47 (32); Wahab Riaz 2/16 (4 overs)		Tamim Iqbal 36 (38); Shane Watson 1/16 (4 overs)

Peshawar won by 5 wickets
Sharjah Cricket Stadium, Sharjah
Umpires: Aleem Dar (Pak) and Tim Robinson (Eng)
Player of the match: Darren Sammy (Peshawar Zalmi)

- Peshawar Zalmi won the toss and elected to field.

3 March
16:30 (D/N)
Scorecard

Quetta Gladiators; 102 (15.4 overs)	v	Multan Sultans; 108/1 (16.4 overs)
Sarfraz Ahmed 30 (33); Sohail Tanvir 3/14 (3 overs)		Kumar Sangakkara 51* (44); Hasan Khan 1/25 (3 overs)

Multan won by 9 wickets
Sharjah Cricket Stadium, Sharjah
Umpires: Aleem Dar (Pak) and Ahmed Shahab (Pak)
Player of the match: Sohail Tanvir (Multan Sultans)

- Multan Sultans won the toss and elected to field.
- Imran Tahir (Multan Sultans) became the third bowler in PSL history to take a hattrick.

7 March
21:00
Scorecard

Multan Sultans; 152/5 (20 overs)	v	Quetta Gladiators; 156/8 (19.5 overs)
Shoaib Malik 65* (43); Mohammad Nawaz 1/18 (3 overs)		Rilee Rossouw 27 (24); Umar Gul 6/24 (4 overs)

Quetta won by 2 wickets
Dubai International Cricket Stadium, Dubai
Umpires: Aleem Dar (Pak) and Tim Robinson (Eng)
Player of the match: Umar Gul (Multan Sultans)

- Quetta Gladiators won the toss and elected to field.

8 March
21:00
Scorecard

Quetta Gladiators; 180/4 (20 overs)	v	Karachi Kings; 113/8 (20 overs)
Shane Watson 90* (58); Usman Khan 1/22 (4 overs)		Imad Wasim 35 (31); Anwar Ali 2/21 (3 overs)

Quetta won by 67 runs
Dubai International Cricket Stadium, Dubai
Umpires: Shozab Raza (Pak) and Asif Yaqoob (Pak)
Player of the match: Shane Watson (Quetta Gladiators)

- Karachi Kings won the toss and elected to field.
- This was the biggest win in PSL history in term of runs.

10 March 2018
21:00
Scorecard

Peshawar Zalmi; 157/5 (20 overs)	v	Quetta Gladiators; 158/4 (19.2 overs)
Dwayne Smith 49 (33); Shane Watson 2/26 (4 overs)		Sarfraz Ahmed 45* (31); Hasan Ali 1/25 (4 overs)

Quetta won by 6 wickets
Dubai International Cricket Stadium, Dubai
Umpires: Ahmed Shahab (Pak) and Tim Robinson (Eng)
Player of the match: Sarfraz Ahmed (Quetta Gladiators)

- Quetta Gladiators won the toss and elected to field.
- As a result of this match Lahore Qalandars were eliminated from the competition.

14 March 2018
21:00
Scorecard

Lahore Qalandars; 186/4 (20 overs)	v	Quetta Gladiators; 169/6 (20 overs)
Fakhar Zaman 94 (50); Hasan Khan 1/3 (1 over)		Rilee Rossouw 42 (22); Sunil Narine 2/22 (4 overs)

Lahore won by 17 runs
Sharjah Cricket Stadium, Sharjah
Umpires: Rashid Riaz (Pak) and Tim Robinson (Eng)
Player of the match: Fakhar Zaman (Lahore Qalandars)

- Quetta Gladiators won the toss and elected to field.

15 March 2018
21:00
Scorecard

Quetta Gladiators; 147/7 (20 overs)	v	Islamabad United; 149/4 (18.2 overs)
Sarfraz Ahmed 43 (30); Faheem Ashraf 3/19 (4 overs)		JP Duminy 54 (47); Rahat Ali 2/33 (3.2 overs)

Islamabad won by 6 wickets
Sharjah Cricket Stadium, Sharjah
Umpires: Khalid Mahmood (Pak) and Aleem Dar (Pak)
Player of the match: JP Duminy (Islamabad United)

- Quetta Gladiators won the toss and elected to bat.

== Playoffs ==
=== Eliminator ===
Eliminator
20 March 2018
19:00
Scorecard

Peshawar Zalmi; 157 (20 overs)	v	Quetta Gladiators; 156/9 (20 overs)
Liam Dawson 62 (35); Rahat Ali 4/16 (4 overs)		Sarfraz Ahmed 35 (21); Hasan Ali 2/21 (4 overs); Sameen Gul 2/21 (4 overs)

Peshawar won by 1 run
Gaddafi Stadium, Lahore
Umpires: Aleem Dar (Pak) and Rashid Riaz (Pak)
Player of the match: Hasan Ali (Peshawar Zalmi)

- Quetta Gladiators won the toss and elected to field.
- As a result of this match Peshawar Zalmi advanced to Eliminator 2.
- As a result of this match Quetta Gladiators were eliminated from the competition.
