= 2018 Karachi Kings season =

Karachi Kings
2018 season
- Coach: Mickey Arthur
- Captain: Imad Wasim
- Tournament performance: Playoffs 3rd
- League performance: 2nd
- Most runs: Babar Azam (402)
- Most wickets: Usman Shinwari (16)

The Karachi Kings is a franchise cricket team that competed in the 2018 Season of Pakistan Super League. The team represents Karachi a city in Pakistan. Kings were coached by Mickey Arthur and appointed Imad Wasim as their new Captain succeeding from Kumar Sangakara from 2017 edition. They finished the tournament on 3rd position as Peshawar Zalmi beat them by 13 runs in Eliminator round of PSL.

== Major changes ==
Before the 2018 season Kings announced the change of captain as Imad Wasim replaced Kumar Sangakara at the top spot. Shahid Afridi left Peshawar Zalmi and joined the team as president and player. Mitchell Johnson was selected in the initial players draft but was later replaced by Tymal Mills as he pulled out from the tournament.

== Kit manufacturers and sponsors ==
| Kit manufacturer | Shirt sponsor (chest) | Shirt sponsor (back) | Chest branding | Sleeve branding |
|---|---|---|---|---|
| AJ Sports | Bahria Town | Nurture | The Arkadians | Brighto Paints, Imtiaz Super Market, Shield |

Playing kit

== Performance ==
Kings opened the season by ending their losing streak against Quetta Gladiators and beating them by 19 runs. They beat the defending champions, Peshawar Zalmi, in a closely fought game. Chasing a target of 132 runs, the team won with 2 balls and 5 wickets to spare. Their third game was against arch-rivals, Lahore Qalandars. batting first, the Kings posted 159 for 9 on the board thanks to Bopara's unbeaten innings of 50 runs. In reply, the Qalandars got off to a great start, and were 68 for 1 inside 6 overs, but 3 quick wickets from man of the match, Shahid Afridi, ensured a third consecutive win for his side as the Qalandars fell short by 27 runs.

One of the match against Multan Sultans was washed out due to persistent rain. Their unbeaten run in the season was ended by Islamabad United when they were defeated by 154 runs. Batting first, the Kings posted the highest target in Sharjah that year – 154 runs – before failing to defend it and losing the match by 8 wickets.

KK finished on Second position on league stage and qualified for the playoffs where they faced Islamabad United in 1st Qualifier where they lost by 8 wickets.

The Kings got eliminated in the second eliminator match played at Lahore on 21 March 2018 against Peshawar Zalmi.

== Teams standings ==
=== Points table ===
| Pos | Team | Pld | W | L | NR | Pts | NRR |
|---|---|---|---|---|---|---|---|
| 1 | Islamabad United (C) | 10 | 7 | 3 | 0 | 14 | 0.296 |
| 2 | Karachi Kings (3rd) | 10 | 5 | 4 | 1 | 11 | 0.028 |
| 3 | Peshawar Zalmi (R) | 10 | 5 | 5 | 0 | 10 | 0.464 |
| 4 | Quetta Gladiators (4th) | 10 | 5 | 5 | 0 | 10 | 0.312 |
| 5 | Multan Sultans | 10 | 4 | 5 | 1 | 9 | −0.191 |
| 6 | Lahore Qalandars | 10 | 3 | 7 | 0 | 6 | −0.931 |

Source: ESPNcricinfo
- The top 4 teams qualified for the playoffs
- Advanced to Qualifier
- Advanced to Eliminator 1

== Playoffs ==
=== Preliminary ===
==== Qualifier 1 ====
Qualifier 1
18 March 2018
21:00
Scorecard

| Karachi Kings; 154/4 (20 overs) | v | Islamabad United; 155/2 (12.3 overs) |
| Colin Ingram 68* (39); Mohammad Sami 2/20 (4 overs) | | Luke Ronchi 94* (39); Tymal Mills 1/32 (2 overs) |

Islamabad won by 8 wickets
Dubai International Cricket Stadium, Dubai
Umpires: Rashid Riaz (Pak) and Aleem Dar (Pak)
Player of the match: Luke Ronchi (Islamabad United)

- Karachi Kings won the toss and elected to bat.
- This was the largest victory in terms of balls remaining in PSL history.
- As a result of this match IU advanced to the final and KK moved to Eliminator Round.

==== Eliminator 2 ====
Eliminator 2
21 March 2018
19:00
Scorecard

| Peshawar Zalmi; 170/7 (16 overs) | v | Karachi Kings; 157/2 (16 overs) |
| Kamran Akmal 77 (27); Ravi Bopara 3/35 (3 overs) | | Joe Denly 79* (46); Sameen Gul 1/20 (3 overs) |

Peshawar won by 13 runs
Gaddafi Stadium, Lahore
Umpires: Aleem Dar (Pak) and Shozab Raza (Pak)
Player of the match: Kamran Akmal (Peshawar Zalmi)

- Karachi Kings won the toss and elected to field.
- Match was reduced to 16 overs per side due to rain.
- Kamran Akmal (Peshawar Zalmi) scored the fastest fifty of PSL (17 balls).
- As a result of this match Peshawar Zalmi advanced to the final.
- As a result of this match Karachi Kings were eliminated from the competition.
