= 2018 Islamabad United season =

Pakistani based franchise cricket team

Islamabad United
2018 season
- Coach: Dean Jones
- Captain: Misbah-ul-Haq
- Tournament performance: Champions
- League performance: 1st
- Most runs: Luke Ronchi (435)
- Most wickets: Faheem Ashraf (18)

Islamabad United is a franchise cricket team that competed in the 2018 season of Pakistan Super League (PSL). The team represents Islamabad in the PSL. The team was coached by Dean Jones, and captained by Misbah-ul-Haq. In the final, they beat Peshawar Zalmi by 3 wickets to win their second PSL title.

== Kit manufacturers and sponsors ==
Shirt sponsor (chest)	Shirt sponsor (back)	Chest branding	Sleeve branding
Gwadar Golf City	PTCL	Tang	Samaa News, G.F.C, Dairy Milk

Playing kit

== Teams standings ==
=== Points table ===
Pos	Team	Pld	W	L	NR	Pts	NRR
1	Islamabad United (C)	10	7	3	0	14	0.296
2	Karachi Kings (3rd)	10	5	4	1	11	0.028
3	Peshawar Zalmi (R)	10	5	5	0	10	0.464
4	Quetta Gladiators (4th)	10	5	5	0	10	0.312
5	Multan Sultans	10	4	5	1	9	−0.191
6	Lahore Qalandars	10	3	7	0	6	−0.931

Source: ESPNcricinfo
- The top 4 teams qualified for the playoffs
- Advanced to Qualifier
- Advanced to Eliminator 1

== Playoffs ==
=== Preliminary ===
==== Qualifier 1 ====
Qualifier 1
18 March 2018
21:00
Scorecard

Karachi Kings; 154/4 (20 overs)	v	Islamabad United; 155/2 (12.3 overs)
Colin Ingram 68* (39); Mohammad Sami 2/20 (4 overs)		Luke Ronchi 94* (39); Tymal Mills 1/32 (2 overs)

Islamabad won by 8 wickets
Dubai International Cricket Stadium, Dubai
Umpires: Rashid Riaz (Pak) and Aleem Dar (Pak)
Player of the match: Luke Ronchi (Islamabad United)

- Karachi Kings won the toss and elected to bat.
- This was the largest victory in terms of balls remaining in PSL history.
- As a result of this match Islamabad United advanced to the final.

=== Final ===
Final
25 March 2018
20:00
Scorecard

Peshawar Zalmi; 148/9 (20 overs)	v	Islamabad United; 154/7 (16.5 overs)
Chris Jordan 36 (26); Shadab Khan 3/25 (4 overs)		Luke Ronchi 52 (26); Chris Jordan 2/22 (3 overs)

Islamabad won by 3 wickets
National Stadium, Karachi
Umpires: Aleem Dar (Pak) and Shozab Raza (Pak)
Player of the match: Luke Ronchi (Islamabad United)

- Peshawar Zalmi won the toss and elected to bat.
- Islamabad United won the championship as a result of this match and became the most successful team in PSL history.
