= 2019 Pakistan Super League players draft =

The players draft for the 2019 Pakistan Super League was held on 20 November 2018 at Islamabad. More than 630 Pakistani and foreign cricketers were included in the draft, from which each franchise finalised a squad of 16 players along with 4 supplementary players. The tournament was the fourth season of Pakistan Super League, and took place between 14 February and 17 March 2019.

== Background ==
On 29 September 2018, the trade and retention window started. 89 players from Pakistan were announced in five renewed categories; 14 in platinum, 9 in diamond, 20 in gold, 34 in silver and 12 in emerging. 14 overseas players in Platinum category were announced on 4 October. The business window closed on 13 November.

It was reported that Ahmed Shehzad will remain a part of the draft, despite the four-month ban on him playing international cricket. It was also reported on 31 October that Misbah-ul-Haq had decided not to play in fourth onward seasons of PSL, though he will continue to be part of the team United. However, on 19 November, he decided to play in the season and parted ways with United. Brendon McCullum also announced on 3 November that he will not play for Qalandars, and Mohammad Hafeez announced on 8 November his departure from Zalmi. Shahid Afridi also left Karachi Kings.

== Transfers ==
On 16 October 2018, it was announced that Sohail Tanvir was transferred from Sultans to Gladiators for a Diamond pick. On 3 November, it was announced that Sunil Narine and Umar Akmal were transferred from Qalandars to Gladiators, in change of Hasan Khan, Rahat Ali and a platinum pick.

== Retained players ==
On 13 November 2018, PSL announced the retention players list with all six teams retaining a total of 51 players from previous season.

Class	Islamabad United	Karachi Kings	Lahore Qalandars	Multan Sultans	Peshawar Zalmi	Quetta Gladiators
Platinum	Luke Ronchi; Shadab Khan; Faheem Ashraf	Colin Munro; Mohammad Amir; Babar Azam	Fakhar Zaman	Shoaib Malik	Wahab Riaz; Hasan Ali	Sarfraz Ahmed; Sunil Narine
Diamond	Asif Ali; Mohammad Sami	Colin Ingram; Imad Wasim; Usman Khan Shinwari	Yasir Shah	Junaid Khan; Mohammad Irfan	Darren Sammy; Kamran Akmal	Shane Watson; Sohail Tanvir; Mohammad Nawaz
Gold	Rumman Raees	Mohammad Rizwan; Ravi Bopara	Anton Devcich; Rahat Ali	Shan Masood	Liam Dawson	Rilee Rossouw; Umar Akmal
Silver	Hussain Talat; Waqas Maqsood; Sahibzada Farhan; Zafar Gohar		Shaheen Afridi; Agha Salman; Sohail Akhtar; Hasan Khan	Mohammad Abbas; Mohammad Irfan; Umar Siddiq	Umaid Asif; Khalid Usman	Anwar Ali; Saud Shakeel
Emerging				Mohammad Junaid	Sameen Gul	

== Draft picks ==
Following is the list of players picked in the draft by the respective team:

Class	Islamabad United	Karachi Kings	Lahore Qalandars	Multan Sultans	Peshawar Zalmi	Quetta Gladiators
Platinum			AB de Villiers	Steve Smith	Kieron Pollard	
Platinum			Mohammad Hafeez	Shahid Afridi		Dwayne Bravo
Diamond	Ian Bell		Carlos Brathwaite	Joe Denly	Misbah-ul-Haq	
Diamond			Corey Anderson			
Gold	Samit Patel	Sikandar Raza	Sandeep Lamichhane	Qais Ahmad	Dawid Malan	Fawad Ahmed
Gold	Phil Salt			Nicholas Pooran	Umar Amin	
Silver	Cameron Delport	Awais Zia		Laurie Evans	Wayne Madsen	Mohammad Asghar
Silver		Usama Mir	Haris Sohail	Nauman Ali	Sohaib Maqsood	Danish Aziz
Silver		Aaron Summers			Jamal Anwar	Ahsan Ali
Silver		Sohail Khan				
Silver		Iftikhar Ahmed				
Emerging	Muhammad Musa	Ali Imran	Mohammad Imran	Mohammad Ilyas	Nabi Gul	Ghulam Mudassar
Emerging	Nasir Nawaz	Abrar Ahmed	Umair Masood			Naseem Shah
Supplementary	Wayne Parnell	Aamer Yamin	Brendan Taylor	Daniel Christian	Waqar Salamkheil	Harry Gurney
Supplementary	Zahir Khan	Ben Dunk	Gauhar Ali	Tom Moores	Chris Jordan	Ahmed Shehzad
Supplementary	Amad Butt	Liam Livingstone	Aizaz Cheema	Ali Shafiq	Ibtisam Sheikh	Azam Khan
Supplementary	Rizwan Hussain	Jaahid Ali	Haris Rauf	Shakeel Ansar	Samiullah Afridi	Jalat Khan

== New players ==
Platinum

- AB de Villiers
- Steve Smith
- Corey Anderson
- Dan Christian

Diamond

- Craig Overton
- Ben Cutting
- Mujeeb Ur Rahman
- Solomon Mire
- Paul Stirling
- Kemar Roach
- Shimron Hetmyer
- Mark Wood

== Replacements ==
The replacement draft was held at Gaddafi Stadium on 24 January 2019. The teams were allowed to pick 21st member in the squad, and to replace the unavailable players with the available ones. Qalandars picked Saad Ali as 21st player and named Hardus Viljoen and David Wiese to play in partial absence of AB de Villiers, Carlos Brathwaite and Corey Anderson. Sultans expanded the squad with Hammad Azam, and picked Andre Russell and James Vince in place of injured Steve Smith and Joe Denly respectively. Gladiators' expansion pick was Mohammad Irfan, while Dwayne Smith will be playing during the absence of Dwayne Bravo. Kings picked Umer Khan as 21st player, and Zalmi replaced Waqar Salamkheil with Andre Fletcher. Meanwhile, Zalmi and United did not submit their squad expansion pick.

Few days before the tournament, Johnson Charles replaced Nicholas Pooran in Sultans squad, who became unavailable after being selected for the ODI series against England, and Mohammad Hasnain replaced Naseem Shah in Gladiators squad, after the latter suffered an injury. On 10 February, it was reported that Chris Green will be playing as a replacement for both Dan Christian and James Vince only for first week of the season, and when Andre Russell would leave after both players arrive, he will become replacement player for Russell in the squad. A day before the tournament, Zalmi picked Pakistani opener Imam-ul-Haq as their 21st player. Qalandars Captain Mohammad Hafeez suffered a thumb injury while bowling against Karachi Kings which resulted in him being ruled out of the season, he was replaced by Salman Butt. Lendl Simmons and Tymal Mills replaced Dawid Malan and Chris Jordan, respectively in Peshawar Zalmi squad, after both were selected in England's squad for the T20I series against West Indies. Riki Wessels replaced Ryan ten Doeschate in Qalandars' squad after the latter injured himself while bowling in a match against Peshawar Zalmi, while Asela Gunaratne replaced Corey Anderson as he was unavailable for Pakistan leg.
