= 2018 Pakistan Super League final =

Tournament final

2018 Pakistan Super League Final
- Event: 2018 Pakistan Super League
Peshawar Zalmi	Islamabad United
Peshawar Zalmi team colors	Islamabad United team colors
148/9	154/7
20 overs	16.5 overs
- Islamabad United won by 3 wickets
- Date: 25 March 2018
- Venue: National Stadium, Karachi
- Player of the match: Luke Ronchi (Islamabad United)
- Umpires: Aleem Dar; Shozab Raza
- Attendance: 34,228

The 2018 Pakistan Super League Final was a Twenty20 cricket match, played on 25 March 2018 at the National Stadium in Karachi, Pakistan to determine the winner of the 2018 Pakistan Super League. The inaugural champions Islamabad United defeated the defending champions Peshawar Zalmi by 3 wickets to win their second title. Luke Ronchi was awarded player of the match (52 runs off 26 balls) and player of the tournament (top scorer with 435 runs) awards. The tickets for final were sold out within 3 hours.

== Route to the Final ==
During the group stage of the 2018 Pakistan Super League each team played ten matches, two against each of the other sides contesting the competition. All matches were played in the United Arab Emirates due to the security situation in Pakistan. The top four teams progressed to the playoff stage. Islamabad United finished the group stage with first position by winning seven of their matches and losing three. Peshawar Zalmi finished the group stage with third position by winning five of their matches and losing five.

=== League stage matches ===
24 February 2018

Peshawar Zalmi; 176/6 (20 overs)	v	Islamabad United; 142/9 (20 overs)

Peshawar won by 34 runs
Dubai International Cricket Stadium, Dubai

9 March 2018

Islamabad United; 182/5 (20 overs)	v	Peshawar Zalmi; 156/9 (20 overs)

Islamabad won by 26 runs
Dubai International Cricket Stadium, Dubai

=== Playoff matches ===
18 March 2018
First qualifying match

Karachi Kings; 154/4 (20 overs)	v	Islamabad United; 155/2 (12.3 overs)

Islamabad won by 8 wickets
Dubai International Cricket Stadium, Dubai

20 March 2018
Eliminator

Peshawar Zalmi; 157 (20 overs)	v	Quetta Gladiators; 156/9 (20 overs)

Peshawar won by 1 run
Gaddafi Stadium, Lahore

21 March 2018
Second qualifying match

Peshawar Zalmi; 170/7 (16 overs)	v	Karachi Kings; 157/2 (16 overs)

Peshawar won by 13 runs
Gaddafi Stadium, Lahore

== Match ==
The final took place on 25 March 2018 at National Stadium in Karachi, Pakistan. This was also the first PSL match taking place in Karachi and a high-profile tournament final match taking place there after almost a decade.

=== Report ===
Peshawar Zalmi won the toss and elected to bat first. Peshawar's in-form batsman Kamran Akmal was out lbw for 1 run off 8 balls, with Samit Patel taking the wicket in the third over early on. The fourth-wicket fifty-partnership between Chris Jordan and Liam Dawson; and Wahab Riaz's 28 runs off 14 balls ensured their side reached to a total of 148 runs in the innings in which Islamabad's Shadab Khan took three wickets.

Islamabad batting second had Luke Ronchi hit five sixes in the first five overs as he raced to 45 runs off just 15 balls, before he got out in the ninth over after scoring a 26-ball 52. By the time, Ronchi and Sahibzada Farhan - who played his own part with 44 runs off 33 balls - had put on 96 runs for the opening partnership in under nine overs. But a sudden collapse resulted in Islamabad losing six wickets for 20 runs leaving them at 116/6. Akmal then dropped a catch at fine leg when Asif Ali attempted a pull shot off Umaid Asif with Islamabad needing 30 runs off 33 balls. Asif Ali then hit three sixes on the trot off Hasan Ali. While the winning runs were scored by Faheem Ashraf who hooked Wahab Riaz for six with just one run required.

== Scorecard ==
Keys

- † indicates team captain
- * indicates not out

Toss: Peshawar Zalmi won the toss and elected to bat.

Peshawar Zalmi innings
Player	Status	Runs	Balls	4s	6s	Strike rate
Kamran Akmal	lbw SP Patel	1	9	0	0	11.11
Andre Fletcher	lbw Shadab	21	15	4	0	140.00
Mohammad Hafeez	c & b SP Patel	8	6	0	1	133.33
Chris Jordan	c Duminy b Hussain	36	26	1	3	138.46
Liam Dawson	b Sami	33	30	1	1	110.00
Saad Nasim	c & b Hussain	2	3	0	0	66.66
†Darren Sammy	lbw Shadab	6	6	1	0	100.00
Umaid Asif	lbw Shadab	0	1	0	0	0.00
Hasan Ali	c Walton b Faheem	6	5	1		120.00
Wahab Riaz	*	28	12	4	1	200.00
Sameen Gul	*	2	5	0	0	40.00
Extras (lb 3, w 2); Total 148/9 (20 overs)				12	6	7.40 RR

Fall of wickets: 12/1 (K Akmal, 2.4 ov), 24/2 (Hafeez, 4.1 ov), 38/3 (Fletcher, 5.6 ov), 90/4 (Jordan, 12.3 ov), 101/5 (Saad Nasim, 14.1 ov), 111/6 (Sammy, 15.4 ov), 111/7 (Umaid, 15.5), 117/8 (LA Dawson, 16.4 ov), 121/9 (Hasan Ali, 17.5 ov)

Islamabad United bowling
Bowler	Overs	Maidens	Runs	Wickets	Econ	Wides	NBs
Samit Patel	4	0	26	2	6.50	0	0
Mohammad Sami	4	0	31	1	7.75	1	0
Shadab Khan	4	0	25	3	6.25	0	0
Faheem Ashraf	4	0	32	1	8.00	0	0
Amad Butt	2	0	13	0	6.50	0	0
Hussain Talat	2	0	18	2	9.00	1	0

Target: 149 runs from 20 overs at 7.45 RR

Islamabad United innings
Player	Status	Runs	Balls	4s	6s	Strike rate
Luke Ronchi	c Fletcher b Jordan	52	26	4	5	200.00
Sahibzada Farhan	c Hasan b Wahab	44	33	5	1	133.33
Chadwick Walton	b Umaid	0	2	0	0	0.00
†JP Duminy	c & b Jordan	2	4	0	0	50.00
Samit Patel	c Hafeez b Hasan Ali	10	13	2	0	76.92
Shadab Khan	c Jordan b Hasan Ali	1	2	0	0	50.00
Hussain Talat	b Wahab	7	11	0	0	63.63
Asif Ali	*	26	6	0	3	433.33
Faheem Ashraf	*	6	4	0	0	150.00
Amad Butt						
Mohammad Sami						
Extras (lb 1, w 5); Total 154/7 (16.5 overs)				11	10	9.14 RR

Fall of wickets: 96/1 (L Ronchi, 8.5 ov), 97/2 (Walton, 9.1 ov), 102/3 (†JP Duminy, 10.3 ov), 112/4 (Farhan, 11.6 ov), 115/5 (SP Patel, 13.1 ov), 116/6 (Shadab, 13.6 ov), 148/7 (Hussain, 16.1 ov)

Peshawar Zalmi bowling
Bowler	Overs	Maidens	Runs	Wickets	Econ	Wides	NBs
Hasan Ali	4	0	53	2	13.25	2	0
Sameen Gul	1	0	9	0	9.00	0	0
Liam Dawson	1	0	15	0	15.00	0	0
Wahab Riaz	3.5	0	28	2	7.30	0	0
Umaid Asif	4	0	26	1	6.50	0	0
Chris Jordan	3	0	22	2	7.33	3	0

Result: Islamabad United won by 3 wickets.

== Match Officials ==
Role	Name
On field Umpire	(Pakistan) Shozab Raza
On field Umpire	(Pakistan) Aleem Dar
TV Umpire	(Pakistan) Ahmed Shahab
Reserve Umpire	(Pakistan) Rashid Riaz
Match Referee	(Sri Lanka) Roshan Mahanama
