= 2018 Pakistan Super League players draft =

The 2018 Pakistan Super League player draft was the player draft for the third season of the Pakistan Super League, held on 12 November 2017 in Lahore. Each franchise was allowed to pick 16 players from total 501 players; including Pakistani and foreign cricketers who took part in the draft. They were divided into five different categories; Platinum, Diamond, Gold, Silver and Emerging and Supplementary. This was Multan Sultans' inaugural season, they were allowed to pick 9 players prior to the draft.

== Retained players ==
The list for the names of 9 retained players in each of the five teams from the previous season was announced on 5 October 2017. The new team Multan Sultans picked their 9 pre-draft players from the players released by other franchises, and their names were announced on 10 October.

Class	Islamabad United	Karachi Kings	Lahore Qalandars	Multan Sultans	Peshawar Zalmi	Quetta Gladiators
Platinum	Andre Russell; Misbah-ul-Haq	Shahid Afridi; Mohammad Amir	Sunil Narine; Umar Akmal	Shoaib Malik; Kieron Pollard	Mohammad Hafeez; Wahab Riaz	Sarfraz Ahmed; Kevin Pietersen
Diamond	Samuel Badree; Mohammad Sami	Imad Wasim; Babar Azam	Brendon McCullum; Fakhar Zaman	Kumar Sangakkara; Sohail Tanvir	Shakib Al Hasan; Kamran Akmal	Rilee Rossouw; Mahmudullah
Gold	Rumman Raees; Shadab Khan	Mohammad Rizwan; Ravi Bopara	Yasir Shah; Sohail Khan	Mohammad Irfan; Junaid Khan	Darren Sammy; Hasan Ali	Asad Shafiq; Mohammad Nawaz
Silver	Iftikhar Ahmed; Amad Butt; Asif Ali	Usman Khan; Usama Mir; Khurram Manzoor	Cameron Delport; Aamer Yamin; Bilawal Bhatti	Kashif Bhatti; Irfan Khan; Sohaib Maqsood	Haris Sohail; Chris Jordan; Mohammad Asghar	Anwar Ali; Mir Hamza; Umar Amin
Emerging	Hussain Talat		Ghulam Mudassar			

== Transfers ==
On 3 October 2017, Shahid Afridi's transfer from Zalmi to Kings was confirmed, occupying one Gold and two Silver picks, which was named as the biggest trade of the season. It was also announced on 5 October that the gold pick Mohammad Rizwan had been picked by Kings in trade for the gold pick Sohail Khan to Qalandars. On 6 October, it was reported that United bought Iftikhar Ahmed from Zalmi in exchange of supplementary pick in second round of draft.

== Players released ==
Further players; who played in 2017 PSL, were released by their franchises, who are:

Islamabad United	Karachi Kings	Lahore Qalandars	Peshawar Zalmi	Quetta Gladiators
Sam Billings; Ben Duckett; Brad Haddin; Steven Finn; Mohammad Irfan; Khalid Latif; Sharjeel Khan; Nicholas Pooran; Saeed Ajmal; Shane Watson; Zohaib Khan; Dwayne Smith; Rafatullah Mohmand	Kumar Sangakkara; Chris Gayle; Rahat Ali; Ryan McLaren; Kashif Bhatti; Shahzaib Hasan; Kieron Pollard; Mahela Jayawardene; Shoaib Malik	Azhar Ali; Jason Roy; Chris Green; Sohail Tanvir; Zafar Gohar; James Franklin; Grant Elliott; Usman Qadir; Dwayne Bravo	Dawid Malan; Tillakaratne Dilshan; Andre Fletcher; Imran Khan; Junaid Khan; Eoin Morgan; Samit Patel; Marlon Samuels; Tamim Iqbal; Sohaib Maqsood; Mohammad Shahzad; Irfan Khan; Khushdil Shah	Ahmed Shehzad; Nathan McCullum; Tymal Mills; Thisara Perera; Saad Nasim; Umar Gul; Zulfiqar Babar; Luke Wright; Carlos Brathwaite; Brad Hodge; Bismillah Khan; David Willey; Noor Wali; Mohammad Nabi

== New players ==
On 30 September, Chairman PCB Najam Sethi announced that following players are the new top signings for the league:

- JP Duminy
- Chris Lynn
- Mitchell Johnson
- Angelo Mathews
- Rashid Khan
- Evin Lewis
- Imran Tahir
- John Hastings
- Mustafizur Rahman
- Mitchell McClenaghan
- Colin Munro
- Luke Ronchi
- Colin Ingram
- Darren Bravo
- Lendl Simmons

On 14 October, some more names for the new signed in players were revealed:

- Tim Bresnan
- Adil Rashid
- James Vince
- Colin de Grandhomme
- Albie Morkel
- Wayne Parnell
- Jason Holder

It was reported on 20 October that the two players from the China national cricket team were signed in by franchise Zalmi:

- Li Jian
- Zhang Yufei

== Draft picks ==
A total of 501 players; 193 Pakistani and 308 overseas were a part of the draft. Earlier, each franchise had a purse of US$1.2 million, but then PCB decided to increase the salary cap of each franchise by US$25,000 on 13 November. They were allowed to stack up their squad with a maximum of 21 players by picking them from the categories in following order with a varying range and limit in price:

- one player each from:
  - Platinum; US$140,000–230,000
  - Diamond; minimum price of US$70,000–85,000
  - Gold; US$50,000–60,000
- two players each from:
  - Silver; US$22,000–33,000
  - Emerging; US$10,000–12,000
- up to five players from Supplementary Rounds; they could be called in as replacements for those players who don't agree to play in Pakistan

Following players were picked by the franchises in the draft:

Class	Islamabad United	Karachi Kings	Lahore Qalandars	Multan Sultans	Peshawar Zalmi	Quetta Gladiators
Platinum	JP Duminy	Colin Ingram	Chris Lynn	Imran Tahir	Dwayne Bravo	Shane Watson
Diamond	Luke Ronchi	Mitchell Johnson	Mustafizur Rahman	Darren Bravo	Tamim Iqbal	Carlos Brathwaite
Gold	Faheem Ashraf	Luke Wright	Bilal Asif	Ahmed Shehzad	Hammad Azam	Rahat Ali
Silver Round 1	Sam Billings	David Wiese	Raza Hasan	Mohammad Abbas	Saad Nasim	Rameez Raja
Silver Round 2	Zafar Gohar	Tabish Khan	Sohail Akhtar	Nicholas Pooran	Taimur Sultan	Saad Ali
Emerging Round 1	(Note: retained pre-draft pick)	Mohammad Irfan		Abdullah Shafique	Sameen Gul	Saud Shakeel
Emerging Round 2	Sahibzada Farhan	Hasan Mohsin	Shaheen Afridi	Saif Badar	Ibtisam Sheikh	Hasan Khan
Round 1	Alex Hales	Colin Munro	Angelo Mathews	Hardus Viljoen	Andre Fletcher	Jason Roy
Round 2	David Willey	Eoin Morgan	Mitchell McClenaghan	Umar Gul	Evin Lewis	Rashid Khan
Round 3	Mohammad Hasan	Saifullah Bangash	Gulraiz Sadaf	Umar Siddiq	Khalid Usman	Azam Khan
Round 4	Mohammad Hasnain	Mohammad Taha	Imran Khan	Ross Whiteley	Mohammad Arif	Faraz Ahmed
Round 5	Rohail Nazir	Mushtaq Ahmed Kalhoro (Note: Talent Hunt)	Salman Irshad	Shan Masood	Khushdil Shah	Mohammad Junaid

== Replacements ==
Following players were picked in PSL replacement draft.

Player	Team	Replaced with	Notes
Carlos Brathwaite	Quetta Gladiators	Jofra Archer	unavailable due to national duties
Mahmudullah	Quetta Gladiators	John Hastings	unavailable due to national duties
Mitchell Johnson	Karachi Kings	Tymal Mills	withdrawn (personal reason)
Luke Wright	Karachi Kings	Joe Denly	withdrawn (fitness issues)
Colin Munro	Karachi Kings	Lendl Simmons	Domestic commitments
Angelo Mathews	Lahore Qalandars	Anton Devcich	Injured
Shakib Al Hasan	Peshawar Zalmi	Sabbir Rahman	Injured
Chris Lynn	Lahore Qalandars	Kyle Abbott	Injured
