= 2018 Pakistan Super League =

3rd edition of the Pakistan Super League

Pakistan Super League 2018
- Dates: 22 February – 25 March 2018
- Administrator: Pakistan Cricket Board
- Cricket format: Twenty20
- Tournament format(s): Double round robin and playoffs
- Hosts: United Arab Emirates; Pakistan
- Champions: Islamabad United (2nd title)
- Runners-up: Peshawar Zalmi
- Participants: 6
- Matches: 34
- Attendance: 398,765 (11,728 per match)
- Player of the series: Luke Ronchi (IU) (435 runs)
- Most runs: Luke Ronchi (IU) (435)
- Most wickets: Faheem Ashraf (IU); Wahab Riaz (PZ) (18)
- Official website: psl-t20.com

The 2018 Pakistan Super League, also known as PSL 3 and branded as HBL PSL 2018, was the third edition of the Pakistan Super League, a professional Twenty20 cricket league established by the Pakistan Cricket Board (PCB). Tournament featured six teams, which was the first expansion of the league since its formation in 2015. The first two editions had featured five teams. The group stage took place in the United Arab Emirates, with two playoff matches played in Lahore and the final at the National Stadium, Karachi.

In the final match, the inaugural champions Islamabad United defeated the defending champions Peshawar Zalmi by three wickets in Karachi to win the title for a second time. Luke Ronchi of Islamabad United was named the Man of the Match of the Final, as well as the player of the tournament and also the leading run scorer, scoring 435 runs in the tournament. Faheem Ashraf of Islamabad United was awarded the best bowler award; as both he and Wahab Riaz of Peshawar Zalmi took 18 wickets to lead the wicket-takers list.

== Background ==
After the success of holding the previous tournament's final at the Gaddafi Stadium, the PCB decided to play eight games of PSL 3 in Pakistan. In addition the PCB chairman Najam Sethi confirmed there would be a sixth team being added in the 2018 edition, with the idea having previously been rejected in 2017. There was much interest in what the sixth team would be, with the PCB shortlisting Hyderabad, Dera Murad Jamali, FATA, Faisalabad and Multan. In the end, the winning party was Multan with Schön Properties paying $5.2 million a year.

== Ceremonies ==
=== Opening ceremony ===
In the opening ceremony, which was hosted in Dubai, American pop singer Jason Derulo featured alongside Pakistani singers including Abida Parveen, Ali Zafar and Shehzad Roy. Hareem Farooq and Bilal Ashraf hosted the ceremony. The ceremony also featured the Pakistani Sachal Orchestra and a firework display, with a teaser of Zafar's first Pakistani film Teefa in Trouble also being shown.

=== Closing ceremony ===
The Closing ceremony took place at National Stadium, Karachi, on 25 March ahead of the final. The ceremony was hosted by Bilal Ashraf, with Pakistani singers Ali Zafar, Shehzad Roy, Strings, Aima Baig and Farhan Saeed performing live in front of 33,000 people in the stadium.

== Teams and squads ==
The 2018 PSL featured six team franchises, with five teams that appeared in previous seasons; and a new team based in Multan.

The player draft for the 2018 season was held in Lahore on 12 November 2017. 501 players, including both Pakistani and international players, were divided into five different categories. Each franchise was allowed to pick a maximum of seven foreign players in their squads, which could have a maximum of 21 members.

Islamabad United	Karachi Kings	Lahore Qalandars	Multan Sultans	Peshawar Zalmi	Quetta Gladiators
Misbah-ul-Haq (c); Iftikhar Ahmed; Asif Ali; Fahim Ashraf; Samuel Badree; Sam Billings; Amad Butt; JP Duminy; Sahibzada Farhan; Steven Finn; Zafar Gohar; Alex Hales; Mohammad Hasnain; Mohammad Hassan; Shadab Khan; Rohail Nazir; Samit Patel; Rumman Raees (vc); Luke Ronchi; Andre Russell; Mohammad Sami; Hussain Talat; Chadwick Walton	Imad Wasim (c); Shahid Afridi; Mohammad Amir; Babar Azam; Danish Aziz; Saifullah Bangash; Ravi Bopara; Joe Denly; Colin Ingram; Mohammad Irfan; Mitchell Johnson; Tabish Khan; Usman Khan; Khurram Manzoor; Tymal Mills; Usama Mir; Hasan Mohsin; Eoin Morgan; Mukhtar Ahmed; Mohammad Rizwan; Lendl Simmons; Mohammad Taha; David Wiese; Zulfiqar Babar	Brendon McCullum(c); Fakhar Zaman (vc); Kyle Abbott; Shaheen Afridi; Sohail Akhtar; Umar Akmal; Bilal Asif; Bilawal Bhatti; Cameron Delport; Anton Devcich; Raza Hasan; Salman Irshad; Imran Khan; Sohail Khan; Chris Lynn; Angelo Mathews; Mitchell McClenaghan; Ghulam Mudassar; Sunil Narine; Mustafizur Rahman; Gulraiz Sadaf; Agha Salman; Yasir Shah; Aamer Yamin	Shoaib Malik (c); Mohammad Abbas; Saif Badar; Kashif Bhatti; Nicholas Pooran (wk); Darren Bravo; Umar Gul; Mohammad Irfan; Irfan Khan; Junaid Khan; Zahir Khan; Sohaib Maqsood; Shan Masood; Kieron Pollard; Kumar Sangakkara (wk); Abdullah Shafique; Ahmed Shehzad; Umar Siddiq; Imran Tahir; Sohail Tanvir; Hardus Viljoen; Ross Whiteley	Daren Sammy (c); Kamran Akmal (wk); Hasan Ali; Mohammad Arif; Mohammad Asghar; Umaid Asif; Hammad Azam; Dwayne Bravo; Liam Dawson; Andre Fletcher (wk); Sameen Gul; Mohammad Hafeez (vc); Shakib Al Hasan; Tamim Iqbal; Chris Jordan; Saad Nasim; Sabbir Rahman; Wahab Riaz; Khushdil Shah; Ibtisam Sheikh; Dwayne Smith; Haris Sohail; Taimur Sultan; Khalid Usman; Riki Wessels (wk)	Sarfraz Ahmed (c); Asad Shafiq (vc); Faraz Ahmed; Anwar Ali; Rahat Ali; Saad Ali; Umar Amin; Jofra Archer; Carlos Brathwaite; Chris Green; Mir Hamza; John Hastings; Thisara Perera; Hasan Khan; Ben Laughlin; Rashid Khan; Mohammad Nawaz; Azam Khan; Kevin Pietersen; Rameez Raja; Rilee Rossouw; Jason Roy; Saud Shakeel; Shane Watson; Mohammad Junaid

== Officials ==
The panel of officials for the tournament consisted of eight umpires and two match referees. Aleem Dar, Ranmore Martinesz and Tim Robinson stood in matches during the tournament. Pakistani umpires Ahmed Shahab, Shozab Raza, Rashid Riaz, Khalid Mehmood and Asif Yaqoob were also part of the panel as well. The match referees panel consisted of former Sri Lankan ICC match referee Roshan Mahanama and Pakistani match referee Mohammad Anees.

== Venues ==
Like the 2016 and 2017 seasons, most of the matches of 2018 season were played in the UAE. However, the playoffs and final took place in Pakistan; they were played in Lahore and Karachi. Each foreign cricketer who played matches in the country was paid an extra US$10,000 for each of these matches.

The International Cricket Council security team visited National Stadium, Karachi, on 23 October, to ensure its condition. The chairman of the PCB Najam Sethi was quoted on 22 November saying "that the renovation of stadium will be completed in February 2018, to host the PSL Final." The tickets for the final were sold out within 3 hours.

United Arab Emirates		Pakistan	
Dubai	Sharjah	Lahore	Karachi
Dubai International Cricket Stadium	Sharjah Cricket Association Stadium	Gaddafi Stadium	National Stadium
Capacity: 25,000	Capacity: 15,000	Capacity: 27,000	Capacity: 34,228
2018 Pakistan Super League is located in United Arab Emirates		2018 Pakistan Super League is located in Pakistan	

== Promotion in media ==
The league was promoted on social media by the hashtag #HBLPSL 2018, due to its three-year contract (2016–18) with HBL Pakistan for title sponsorship. Also, the six teams are promoted by #AbKhel6Ka. It was also promoted by #DilSeJaanLagaDe, the hashtag for the league's official anthem by Ali Zafar.

== Season standings ==
=== Points table ===
Pos	Team	Pld	W	L	NR	Pts	NRR
1	Islamabad United (C)	10	7	3	0	14	0.296
2	Karachi Kings (3rd)	10	5	4	1	11	0.028
3	Peshawar Zalmi (R)	10	5	5	0	10	0.464
4	Quetta Gladiators (4th)	10	5	5	0	10	0.312
5	Multan Sultans	10	4	5	1	9	−0.191
6	Lahore Qalandars	10	3	7	0	6	−0.931

Source: ESPNcricinfo
- The top 4 teams qualified for the playoffs
- Advanced to Qualifier
- Advanced to Eliminator 1

Notes:

- C = Champions;
- R = Runner-up;
- (x) = Position at the end of the tournament;

== League stage ==
The league stage of the tournament ran from 22 February to 16 March 2018.

=== Summary ===
==== Week 1 ====
The month long tournament began on 22 February between the defending champions, Peshawar Zalmi and the new team the Multan Sultans. Peshawar batted first and, despite losing a wicket in the second over, went on to score 151/6 with Mohammed Hafeez top-scoring with 59 runs. The Sultans chased the score down, losing just 3 wickets, giving them a 7 wicket win, and winning on their PSL debut. The first double-header of the group stage saw wins for Karachi and Multan by 19 and 43 runs respectively. The Multan win brought up an interesting stat which was that both of the first two PSL hat tricks took place in Dubai, on a Friday, under Shoaib Malik's captaincy, against the Lahore Qalandars. The next four games were all one-sided; in the first the defending champions Peshawar restricted Islamabad to 149/9 from Islamabad's 20 overs, to get their first win of the tournament with Umaid Asif taking a 4-fer (4 wicket haul) on debut for Zalmi. On the same day, the Quetta Gladiators quickly chased down 119 inside 14 overs against the Lahore Qalandars. In the sixth game, the Multan Sultans' winning run came to an end against Islamabad United. In the game, the Sultans were all out for 113 with United winning by 5 wickets. In the next game despite Dwayne Smith's 71 not out, the Karachi Kings chased down 131 to beat Peshawar by 5 wickets. At Dubai, the rivals Lahore and Karachi faced off, Lahore's poor form continued as they lost their third consecutive game in the tournament with Karachi winning by 27 runs and Shahid Afridi taking 3–19. In the final game of week 1, which was the first game of the tournament in Sharjah, the Gladiators won comfortably by 6 wickets against Islamabad.

==== Week 2 ====
The second week began dramatically, with Peshawar having a batting collapse to fall to 125/5 in their innings against the Quetta Gladiators in Sharjah. In next the Zalmi captain Daren Sammy, who was earlier taken off with an injury, came out and hit two sixes and a four to get Zalmi a win. After game 11 between Multan and Karachi in Sharjah was abandoned at the toss, the other game on the day was also hosted at Sharjah. The game between Lahore and Islamabad was the first in PSL history at that point, to finish with a super over as both teams were tied on 121. In Lahore's over they finished with 15/1, while in Islamabad's over they got 19 winning the game with a last ball 6. The game after was more straightforward, with an Imran Tahir hat-trick downing Quetta and giving Multan the win. The game after made history as the first ever 10 wicket win in the PSL, as Peshawar Zalmi chased down 101 without losing a wicket. The next day, Islamabad United beat Karachi Kings by 8 wickets with help from a Luke Ronchi 71. On the same day, a Sohaib Maqsood* carried the Multan Sultans' to another win against Peshawar Zalmi, this time by 19 runs. The day after Umar Gul rolled back the years taking 6/24 for the Multan Sultans', but the effort was in vain as the then Pakistan under 19 captain Hasan Khan hit a last over 6 to give Quetta a 2 wicket win. The last day of week 2 saw a double-header, with both games being played at Dubai. In the first game a Luke Ronchi 77 helped Islamabad beat Lahore by 6 wickets, while in the second game Quetta beat Karachi by 67 runs. This was at the time the biggest win by runs in PSL history.

==== Week 3 ====
Week 3 started with a Lahore win, as future Pakistan international Shaheen Shah Afridi took 5/4 in his 3.4 overs against the Multan Sultans. In game 21 despite 3/30 and 33 not out from Wahab Riaz, Islamabad United beat Peshawar Zalmi by 26 runs taking Islamabad to the top of the table. The day after was a double header, with a Joe Denly 78 from 55 balls helping the Karachi Kings to a comfortable win over Multan by 63 runs. The second game of the day involved Peshawar and Quetta, with a Sarfaraz Ahmed 45* guiding Quetta home with 6 wickets to spare and eliminating Lahore in the process. A super over was needed again to separate Lahore and Karachi with them both being tied 163 after both of their 20 overs, in the end though Sunil Narine held his nerve to give Lahore their second win of the season. A crucial encounter followed 2 days later, with Islamabad and Multan facing off at Sharjah Cricket Stadium. In the end though despite 73 off 47 from Kieron Pollard, Islamabad won by 33 runs meaning that they and Quetta both advanced to the playoffs. In game 26, Lahore continued their winning run against Quetta thanks to 94 off 50 from Fakhar Zaman. The next day, Peshawar beat Karachi helped by 75 by Kamran Akmal and 3/17 from Liam Dawson keeping Peshawar in the tournament. Islamabad continued their winning run in game 28, ensuring that they finished at the top of the table by beating Quetta by 6 wickets.

==== Week 4 ====
Week 4 only consisted of two games as the tournament moved from the League stage to the knockouts, in the penultimate game the Lahore Qalandars scored 172 in their innings against Peshawar. In response Kamran Akmal scored his 2nd century in the PSL becoming the first player to score two centuries in the history of the tournament, and guiding Peshawar into the playoffs with a win. While in the final game taking place on the same day Islamabad United collapsed to 121, allowing the Karachi Kings to claim a playoff spot and eliminate the Multan Sultans in the process.

=== Table of results ===
Visitor team →	IU	KK	LQ	MS	PZ	QG
Home team ↓	IU	KK	LQ	MS	PZ	QG
Islamabad United		Islamabad; 8 wickets	Islamabad; 6 wickets	Islamabad; 33 runs	Peshawar; 34 runs	Quetta; 6 wickets
Karachi Kings	Karachi; 7 wickets		Karachi; 27 runs	Karachi; 63 runs	Peshawar; 44 runs	Karachi; 19 runs
Lahore Qalandars	Islamabad; Super Over	Lahore; Super Over		Multan; 43 runs	Peshawar; 7 wickets	Quetta; 9 wickets
Multan Sultans	Islamabad; 5 wickets	Match abandoned	Lahore; 6 wickets		Multan; 19 runs	Multan; 9 wickets
Peshawar Zalmi	Islamabad; 26 runs	Karachi; 5 wickets	Peshawar; 10 wickets	Multan; 7 wickets		Peshawar; 5 wickets
Quetta Gladiators	Islamabad; 6 wickets	Quetta; 67 runs	Lahore; 17 runs	Quetta; 2 wickets	Quetta; 6 wickets	

Home team won	Visitor team won

- Note: Results listed are according to the home (horizontal) and visitor (vertical) teams.
- Note: Click on a result to see a summary of the match.

=== League progression ===
Team	Group matches										Playoffs		
Team	1	2	3	4	5	6	7	8	9	10	E1/Q	E2	F
Islamabad United	0	2	2	4	6	8	10	12	14	14	W		W
Karachi Kings	2	4	6	7	7	7	9	9	9	11	L	L	
Lahore Qalandars	0	0	0	0	0	0	2	4	6	6			
Multan Sultans	2	4	4	5	7	9	9	9	9	9			
Peshawar Zalmi	0	2	2	4	6	6	6	6	8	10	W	W	L
Quetta Gladiators	0	2	4	4	4	6	8	10	10	10	L		

Win	Loss	No result

- Note: The total points at the end of each group match are listed.
- Note: Click on the points (group matches) or W/L (playoffs) to see the match summary.

== Fixtures ==
22 February 2018
22:00
Scorecard

Peshawar Zalmi; 151/6 (20 overs)	v	Multan Sultans; 152/3 (19.1 overs)
Mohammad Hafeez 59 (52); Mohammad Irfan 2/19 (4 overs)		Kumar Sangakkara 57 (51); Wahab Riaz 2/19 (4 overs)

Multan won by 7 wickets
Dubai International Cricket Stadium, Dubai
Umpires: Tim Robinson (Eng) and Ahmed Shahab (Pak)
Player of the match: Kumar Sangakkara (Multan Sultans)

- Multan Sultans won the toss and elected to field.
- Ibtisam Sheikh (Peshawar Zalmi) made his T20 debut.

23 February 2018
16:30 (D/N)
Scorecard

Karachi Kings; 149/9 (20 overs)	v	Quetta Gladiators; 130/9 (20 overs)
Colin Ingram 41 (21); Shane Watson 3/22 (4 overs)		Umar Amin 31 (31); Imad Wasim 2/19 (4 overs)

Karachi won by 19 runs
Dubai International Cricket Stadium, Dubai
Umpires: Ranmore Martinesz (SL) and Rashid Riaz (Pak)
Player of the match: Colin Ingram (Karachi Kings)

- Karachi Kings won the toss and elected to bat.

23 February 2018
21:00
Scorecard

Multan Sultans; 179/5 (20 overs)	v	Lahore Qalandars; 136 (17.2 overs)
Kumar Sangakkara 63 (44); Mustafizur Rahman 2/22 (4 overs)		Fakhar Zaman 49 (30); Junaid Khan 3/24 (3 overs)

Multan won by 43 runs
Dubai International Cricket Stadium, Dubai
Umpires: Asif Yaqoob (Pak) and Tim Robinson (Eng)
Player of the match: Imran Tahir (Multan Sultans)

- Lahore Qalandars won the toss and elected to field.
- Shaheen Afridi (Lahore Qalandars) made his T20 debut.
- Junaid Khan (Multan Sultans) became the first bowler in the team and the second bowler in PSL history to take a hattrick.

24 February 2018
16:30 (D/N)
Scorecard

Peshawar Zalmi; 176/6 (20 overs)	v	Islamabad United; 142/9 (20 overs)
Kamran Akmal 53 (32); Faheem Ashraf 2/37 (4 overs)		Faheem Ashraf 54* (30); Umaid Asif 4/23 (4 overs)

Peshawar won by 34 runs
Dubai International Cricket Stadium, Dubai
Umpires: Ranmore Martinesz (SL) and Rashid Riaz (Pak)
Player of the match: Umaid Asif (Peshawar Zalmi)

- Islamabad United won the toss and elected to field.

24 February 2018
21:00
Scorecard

Lahore Qalandars; 119/9 (20 overs)	v	Quetta Gladiators; 120/1 (14 overs)
Brendon McCullum 30 (18); Jofra Archer 3/23 (4 overs)		Shane Watson 66 (42); Sunil Narine 1/40 (4 overs)

Quetta won by 9 wickets
Dubai International Cricket Stadium, Dubai
Umpires: Asif Yaqoob (Pak) and Tim Robinson (Eng)
Player of the match: Mohammad Nawaz (Quetta Gladiators)

- Quetta Gladiators won the toss and elected to field.

25 February 2018
16:30 (D/N)
Scorecard

Multan Sultans; 113 (19.5 overs)	v	Islamabad United; 117/5 (17.4 overs)
Shoaib Malik 35 (36); Rumman Raees 3/14 (3.5 overs)		Hussain Talat 48* (34); Imran Tahir 3/19 (4 overs)

Islamabad won by 5 wickets
Dubai International Cricket Stadium, Dubai
Umpires: Ranmore Martinesz (SL) and Rashid Riaz (Pak)
Player of the match: Hussain Talat (Islamabad United)

- Islamabad United won the toss and elected to field.

25 February 2018
21:00
Scorecard

Peshawar Zalmi; 131/9 (20 overs)	v	Karachi Kings; 135/5 (19.4 overs)
Dwayne Smith 71* (51); Mohammad Amir 2/6 (2 overs)		Joe Denly 29 (39); Ibtisam Sheikh 2/25 (4 overs)

Karachi won by 5 wickets
Dubai International Cricket Stadium, Dubai
Umpires: Ranmore Martinesz (SL) and Tim Robinson (Eng)
Player of the match: Dwayne Smith (Peshawar Zalmi)

- Peshawar Zalmi won the toss and elected to bat.

26 February 2018
21:00
Scorecard

Karachi Kings; 159/7 (20 overs)	v	Lahore Qalandars; 132 (18.3 overs)
Ravi Bopara 50* (34); Sunil Narine 2/18 (4 overs)		Brendon McCullum 44 (30); Shahid Afridi 3/19 (4 overs)

Karachi won by 27 runs
Dubai International Cricket Stadium, Dubai
Umpires: Ranmore Martinesz (SL) and Tim Robinson (Eng)
Player of the match: Shahid Afridi (Karachi Kings)

- Karachi Kings won the toss and elected to bat.

28 February 2018
21:00
Scorecard

Islamabad United; 134/7 (20 overs)	v	Quetta Gladiators; 135/4 (17.1 overs)
Luke Ronchi 43 (26); Hasan Khan 1/12 (2 overs)		Kevin Pietersen 48 (34); Steven Finn 3/35 (4 overs)

Quetta won by 6 wickets
Sharjah Cricket Stadium, Sharjah
Umpires: Tim Robinson (Eng) and Ranmore Martinesz (SL)
Player of the match: Kevin Pietersen (Quetta Gladiators)

- Quetta Gladiators won the toss and elected to field.

1 March 2018
21:00
Scorecard

Quetta Gladiators; 141/8 (20 overs)	v	Peshawar Zalmi; 143/5 (19.4 overs)
Shane Watson 47 (32); Wahab Riaz 2/16 (4 overs)		Tamim Iqbal 36 (38); Shane Watson 1/16 (4 overs)

Peshawar won by 5 wickets
Sharjah Cricket Stadium, Sharjah
Umpires: Aleem Dar (Pak) and Tim Robinson (Eng)
Player of the match: Darren Sammy (Peshawar Zalmi)

- Peshawar Zalmi won the toss and elected to field.

2 March 2018
16:30 (D/N)
Scorecard

Karachi Kings	v	Multan Sultans

Match abandoned
Sharjah Cricket Stadium, Sharjah
Umpires: Aleem Dar (Pak) and Asif Yaqoob (Pak)

- Karachi Kings won the toss and elected to bat.
- No play was possible due to rain.

2 March 2018
21:00
Scorecard

Islamabad United; 121/9 (20 overs)	v	Lahore Qalandars; 121 (19.4 overs)
JP Duminy 34 (36); Yasir Shah 3/20 (4 overs)		Agha Salman 48 (35); Samit Patel 3/17 (4 overs)

Match tied; (Islamabad won the super over)
Sharjah Cricket Stadium, Sharjah
Umpires: Khalid Mahmood (Pak) and Ranmore Martinesz (SL)
Player of the match: Mohammad Sami (Islamabad United)

- Lahore Qalandars won the toss and elected to field.
- This was the first ever super over in PSL history.
- Super Over: Lahore Qalandars 15/1, Islamabad United 19/0.

3 March 2018
16:30 (D/N)
Scorecard

Quetta Gladiators; 102 (15.4 overs)	v	Multan Sultans; 108/1 (16.4 overs)
Sarfraz Ahmed 30 (33); Sohail Tanvir 3/14 (3 overs)		Kumar Sangakkara 51* (44); Hasan Khan 1/25 (3 overs)

Multan won by 9 wickets
Sharjah Cricket Stadium, Sharjah
Umpires: Aleem Dar (Pak) and Ahmed Shahab (Pak)
Player of the match: Sohail Tanvir (Multan Sultans)

- Multan Sultans won the toss and elected to field.
- Imran Tahir (Multan Sultans) became the third bowler in PSL history to take a hattrick.

3 March 2018
21:00
Scorecard

Lahore Qalandars; 100 (17.2 overs)	v	Peshawar Zalmi; 104/0 (13.4 overs)
Fakhar Zaman 30 (17); Liam Dawson 3/20 (4 overs)		Kamran Akmal 57* (47); Fakhar Zaman 0/1 (1 over)

Peshawar won by 10 wickets
Sharjah Cricket Stadium, Sharjah
Umpires: Tim Robinson (Eng) and Ranmore Martinesz (SL)
Player of the match: Liam Dawson (Peshawar Zalmi)

- Lahore Qalandars won the toss and elected to bat.
- This was the first ever victory by a 10 wicket margin in PSL history.

4 March 2018
21:00
Scorecard

Karachi Kings; 153/6 (20 overs)	v	Islamabad United; 156/2 (17.2 overs)
Babar Azam 55 (53); Faheem Ashraf 3/23 (4 overs)		Luke Ronchi 71 (37); Mohammad Irfan 1/16 (3 overs)

Islamabad won by 8 wickets
Sharjah Cricket Stadium, Sharjah
Umpires: Aleem Dar (Pak) and Tim Robinson (Eng)
Player of the match: Luke Ronchi (Islamabad United)

- Islamabad United won the toss and elected to field.

6 March 2018
21:00
Scorecard

Multan Sultans; 183/3 (20 overs)	v	Peshawar Zalmi; 164/8 (20 overs)
Sohaib Maqsood 85* (42); Liam Dawson 1/17 (4 overs)		Mohammad Hafeez 56 (41); Sohail Tanvir 3/14 (4 overs)

Multan won by 19 runs
Dubai International Cricket Stadium, Dubai
Umpires: Aleem Dar (Pak) and Asif Yaqoob (Pak)
Player of the match: Sohaib Maqsood (Multan Sultans)

- Peshawar Zalmi won the toss and elected to field.

7 March 2018
21:00
Scorecard

Multan Sultans; 152/5 (20 overs)	v	Quetta Gladiators; 156/8 (19.5 overs)
Shoaib Malik 65* (43); Mohammad Nawaz 1/18 (3 overs)		Rilee Rossouw 27 (24); Umar Gul 6/24 (4 overs)

Quetta won by 2 wickets
Dubai International Cricket Stadium, Dubai
Umpires: Aleem Dar (Pak) and Tim Robinson (Eng)
Player of the match: Umar Gul (Multan Sultans)

- Quetta Gladiators won the toss and elected to field.

8 March 2018
16:30 (D/N)
Scorecard

Lahore Qalandars; 163/8 (20 overs)	v	Islamabad United; 164/4 (17.4 overs)
Anton Devcich 62 (42); Faheem Ashraf 3/32 (4 overs)		Luke Ronchi 77 (41); Sunil Narine 3/28 (4 overs)

Islamabad won by 6 wickets
Dubai International Cricket Stadium, Dubai
Umpires: Aleem Dar (Pak) and Tim Robinson (Eng)
Player of the match: Luke Ronchi (Islamabad United)

- Islamabad United won the toss and elected to field.

8 March 2018
21:00
Scorecard

Quetta Gladiators; 180/4 (20 overs)	v	Karachi Kings; 113/8 (20 overs)
Shane Watson 90* (58); Usman Khan 1/22 (4 overs)		Imad Wasim 35 (31); Anwar Ali 2/21 (3 overs)

Quetta won by 67 runs
Dubai International Cricket Stadium, Dubai
Umpires: Shozab Raza (Pak) and Asif Yaqoob (Pak)
Player of the match: Shane Watson (Quetta Gladiators)

- Karachi Kings won the toss and elected to field.
- This was the biggest win in PSL history in term of runs.

9 March 2018
16:30 (D/N)
Scorecard

Multan Sultans; 114 (19.4 overs)	v	Lahore Qalandars; 115/4 (18.4 overs)
Kumar Sangakkara 45 (30); Shaheen Afridi 5/4 (3.4 overs)		Brendon McCullum 35* (35); Shoaib Malik 1/6 (1 over)

Lahore won by 6 wickets
Dubai International Cricket Stadium, Dubai
Umpires: Asif Yaqoob (Pak) and Tim Robinson (Eng)
Player of the match: Shaheen Afridi (Lahore Qalandars)

- Multan Sultans won the toss and elected to bat.

9 March 2018
21:00
Scorecard

Islamabad United; 182/5 (20 overs)	v	Peshawar Zalmi; 156/9 (20 overs)
JP Duminy 73* (54); Wahab Riaz 3/30 (4 overs)		Wahab Riaz 33* (25); Samit Patel 4/34 (4 overs)

Islamabad won by 26 runs
Dubai International Cricket Stadium, Dubai
Umpires: Ahmed Shahab (Pak) and Aleem Dar (Pak)
Player of the match: JP Duminy (Islamabad United)

- Peshawar Zalmi won the toss and elected to field.

10 March 2018
16:30 (D/N)
Scorecard

Karachi Kings; 188/3 (20 overs)	v	Multan Sultans; 125 (19.4 overs)
Joe Denly 78 (55); Hardus Viljoen 2/49 (4 overs)		Sohail Tanvir 34* (29); Shahid Afridi 3/18 (4 overs)

Karachi won by 63 runs
Dubai International Cricket Stadium, Dubai
Umpires: Aleem Dar (Pak) and Asif Yaqoob (Pak)
Player of the match: Shahid Afridi (Karachi Kings)

- Multan Sultans won the toss and elected to field.

10 March 2018
21:00
Scorecard

Peshawar Zalmi; 157/5 (20 overs)	v	Quetta Gladiators; 158/4 (19.2 overs)
Dwayne Smith 49 (33); Shane Watson 2/26 (4 overs)		Sarfraz Ahmed 45* (31); Hasan Ali 1/25 (4 overs)

Quetta won by 6 wickets
Dubai International Cricket Stadium, Dubai
Umpires: Ahmed Shahab (Pak) and Tim Robinson (Eng)
Player of the match: Sarfraz Ahmed (Quetta Gladiators)

- Quetta Gladiators won the toss and elected to field.
- As a result of this match Lahore Qalandars were eliminated from the competition.

11 March 2018
21:00
Scorecard

Karachi Kings; 163/5 (20 overs)	v	Lahore Qalandars; 163/8 (20 overs)
Babar Azam 61 (49); Sohail Khan 3/34 (4 overs)		Agha Salman 50 (45); Mohammad Irfan 2/35 (4 overs)

Match tied; (Lahore won the super over)
Dubai International Cricket Stadium, Dubai
Umpires: Aleem Dar (Pak) and Tim Robinson (Eng)
Player of the match: Agha Salman (Lahore Qalandars)

- Lahore Qalandars won the toss and elected to field.
- Super Over: Lahore Qalandars 11 all out, Karachi Kings 8/1.

13 March 2018
21:00
Scorecard

Islamabad United; 185/4 (20 overs)	v	Multan Sultans; 152 (19.1 overs)
Luke Ronchi 58 (36); Umar Gul 2/26 (4 overs)		Kieron Pollard 73 (47); Samit Patel 2/11 (2 overs)

Islamabad won by 33 runs
Sharjah Cricket Stadium, Sharjah
Umpires: Aleem Dar (Pak) and Rashid Riaz (Pak)
Player of the match: Luke Ronchi (Islamabad United)

- Multan Sultans won the toss and elected to field.
- As a result of this match Islamabad United and Quetta Gladiators advanced to playoffs.

14 March 2018
21:00
Scorecard

Lahore Qalandars; 186/4 (20 overs)	v	Quetta Gladiators; 169/6 (20 overs)
Fakhar Zaman 94 (50); Hasan Khan 1/3 (1 over)		Rilee Rossouw 42 (22); Sunil Narine 2/22 (4 overs)

Lahore won by 17 runs
Sharjah Cricket Stadium, Sharjah
Umpires: Rashid Riaz (Pak) and Tim Robinson (Eng)
Player of the match: Fakhar Zaman (Lahore Qalandars)

- Quetta Gladiators won the toss and elected to field.

15 March 2018
16:30 (D/N)
Scorecard

Peshawar Zalmi; 181/6 (20 overs)	v	Karachi Kings; 137/8 (20 overs)
Kamran Akmal 75 (51); Usman Khan 3/11 (4 overs)		Babar Azam 66 (50); Liam Dawson 3/17 (4 overs)

Peshawar won by 44 runs
Sharjah Cricket Stadium, Sharjah
Umpires: Ahmed Shahab (Pak) and Shozab Raza (Pak)
Player of the match: Kamran Akmal (Peshawar Zalmi)

- Peshawar Zalmi won the toss and elected to bat.

15 March 2018
21:00
Scorecard

Quetta Gladiators; 147/7 (20 overs)	v	Islamabad United; 149/4 (18.2 overs)
Sarfraz Ahmed 43 (30); Faheem Ashraf 3/19 (4 overs)		JP Duminy 54 (47); Rahat Ali 2/33 (3.2 overs)

Islamabad won by 6 wickets
Sharjah Cricket Stadium, Sharjah
Umpires: Khalid Mahmood (Pak) and Aleem Dar (Pak)
Player of the match: JP Duminy (Islamabad United)

- Quetta Gladiators won the toss and elected to bat.

16 March 2018
16:30 (D/N)
Scorecard

Lahore Qalandars; 172/4 (20 overs)	v	Peshawar Zalmi; 176/3 (18 overs)
Anton Devcich 70 (42); Hasan Ali 2/24 (4 overs)		Kamran Akmal 107* (61); Yasir Shah 2/40 (4 overs)

Peshawar won by 7 wickets
Sharjah Cricket Stadium, Sharjah
Umpires: Rashid Riaz (Pak) and Shozab Raza (Pak)
Player of the match: Kamran Akmal (Peshawar Zalmi)

- Lahore Qalandars won the toss and elected to bat.
- Kamran Akmal (Peshawar Zalmi) scored his second century in PSL and the first player to do it.
- As a result of this match Peshawar Zalmi advanced to playoffs.

16 March 2018
21:00
Scorecard

Islamabad United; 124 (19 overs)	v	Karachi Kings; 125/3 (17 overs)
Asif Ali 34 (14); Usman Khan 4/17 (4 overs)		Joe Denly 36 (28); Faheem Ashraf 1/13 (3 overs)

Karachi won by 7 wickets
Sharjah Cricket Stadium, Sharjah
Umpires: Aleem Dar (Pak) and Khalid Mahmood (Pak)
Player of the match: Usman Khan (Karachi Kings)

- Karachi Kings won the toss and elected to field.
- Karachi Kings advanced to playoffs as a result of this match.
- As a result of this match Multan Sultans were eliminated from the competition.

== Playoffs ==
Semifinals
18 March — Dubai
1	Islamabad United	155/2 (12.3 overs)
2	Karachi Kings	154/4 (20 overs)
20 March — Lahore
3	Peshawar Zalmi	157 (20 overs)
4	Quetta Gladiators	156/9 (20 overs)

Preliminary final
21 March — Lahore
2	Karachi Kings	157/2 (16 overs)
3	Peshawar Zalmi	170/7 (16 overs)

Final
25 March — Karachi
1	Islamabad United	154/7 (16.5 overs)
3	Peshawar Zalmi	148/9 (20 overs)

=== Preliminary ===
==== Qualifier 1 ====
Qualifier 1
18 March 2018
21:00
Scorecard

Karachi Kings; 154/4 (20 overs)	v	Islamabad United; 155/2 (12.3 overs)
Colin Ingram 68* (39); Mohammad Sami 2/20 (4 overs)		Luke Ronchi 94* (39); Tymal Mills 1/32 (2 overs)

Islamabad won by 8 wickets
Dubai International Cricket Stadium, Dubai
Umpires: Rashid Riaz (Pak) and Aleem Dar (Pak)
Player of the match: Luke Ronchi (Islamabad United)

- Karachi Kings won the toss and elected to bat.
- This was the largest victory in terms of balls remaining in PSL history.
- As a result of this match Islamabad United advanced to the final.

The qualifiers meant the top two teams on the table, Karachi and Islamabad, would face off. Karachi Kings won the toss and chose to bat first. One of the openers Khurram Manzoor, got out early while the other Joe Denly got his half century before getting out hit-wicket. Their number 3 batsman Babar Azam also got out cheaply as he got out second ball for a silver duck. Next came in Karachi's captain Eoin Morgan who made 21 before being sent back to the pavilion. The top-scorer of the kings innings was Colin Ingram with an unbeaten 61 helping Karachi get to 150. The pick of the bowlers was the former Pakistan international Mohammad Sami with 2-20. In response the game never looked in doubt as a quickfire 94 not out from Luke Ronchi sent Islamabad to the final. Ronchi was well supported by the other opener Sahibzada Farhan who made 29 with Samit Patel hitting the winning runs, to get the fastest victory in terms of balls remaining ever in the PSL at the time.

==== Eliminator ====
Eliminator
20 March 2018
19:00
Scorecard

Peshawar Zalmi; 157 (20 overs)	v	Quetta Gladiators; 156/9 (20 overs)
Liam Dawson 62 (35); Rahat Ali 4/16 (4 overs)		Sarfraz Ahmed 35 (21); Hasan Ali 2/21 (4 overs); Sameen Gul 2/21 (4 overs)

Peshawar won by 1 run
Gaddafi Stadium, Lahore
Umpires: Aleem Dar (Pak) and Rashid Riaz (Pak)
Player of the match: Hasan Ali (Peshawar Zalmi)

- Quetta Gladiators won the toss and elected to field.
- As a result of this match Peshawar Zalmi advanced to Eliminator 2.
- As a result of this match Quetta Gladiators were eliminated from the competition.

The eliminator put the teams in 3rd and 4th against each other, with these being Peshawar Zalmi and Quetta Gladiators. The two teams previously played against each other in the year before's final. Quetta Gladiators won the toss and chose to field. The Gladiators dismissed the Zalmi openers quite cheaply with Kamran Akmal out for a duck. Andre Fletcher came in but was soon sent back to the pavilion as well for a single run. Liam Dawson and Mohammed Hafeez steadied the ship for Zalmi with 62 and 25 respectively to help get Peshawar over 150. Rahat Ali was the pick of the bowlers with 4–16. In response both of Quetta's openers fluctuated and were both out cheaply. Afterwards twin 35's from the Gladiators captain Sarfaraz Ahmed and Mohammad Nawaz brought some stability to their innings. Going in to the final over it looked like the game was over for the gladiators who needed 25 off it. However Anwar Ali scored 23 off the first five balls against Liam Dawson meaning Quetta needed 3 off the last ball to win, then a dropped catch followed but Mir Hamza was run out trying to get back for 2 and draw the game. This meant Peshawar Zalmi won by 1 run having previously lost twice to the Quetta by a run. All of Zalmi's bowlers took 2 wickets except Dawson with Hasan Ali and Sameen Gul both taking 2-21

==== Eliminator 2 ====
Eliminator 2
21 March 2018
19:00
Scorecard

Peshawar Zalmi; 170/7 (16 overs)	v	Karachi Kings; 157/2 (16 overs)
Kamran Akmal 77 (27); Ravi Bopara 3/35 (3 overs)		Joe Denly 79* (46); Sameen Gul 1/20 (3 overs)

Peshawar won by 13 runs
Gaddafi Stadium, Lahore
Umpires: Aleem Dar (Pak) and Shozab Raza (Pak)
Player of the match: Kamran Akmal (Peshawar Zalmi)

- Karachi Kings won the toss and elected to field.
- Match was reduced to 16 overs per side due to rain.
- Kamran Akmal (Peshawar Zalmi) scored the fastest fifty of PSL (17 balls).
- As a result of this match Peshawar Zalmi advanced to the final.
- As a result of this match Karachi Kings were eliminated from the competition.

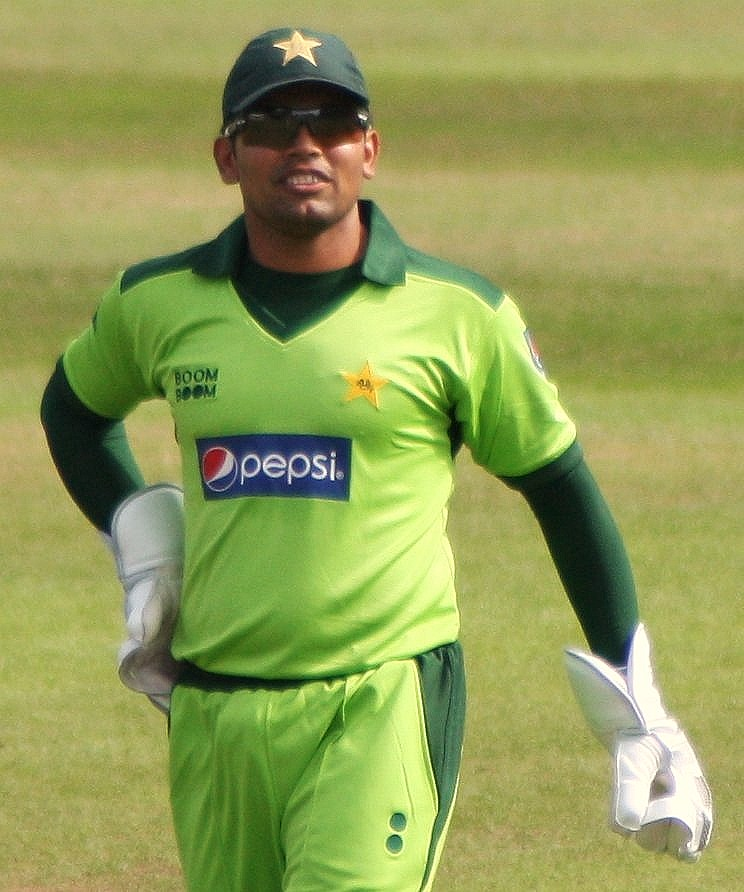
Kamran Akmal (pictured in 2010) scored 77 off 27 balls against Karachi Kings.

The second eliminator put the loser of the qualifier the Karachi Kings against the winner of the first eliminator Peshawar Zalmi."Eliminator 1 Scorecard The game got off to a late start due to rain which meant that both teams innings were reduced to 16 overs. Karachi Kings won the toss and decided to field first. Both of Zalmi's openers got off to a good start with Andre Fletcher making 34 and Kamran Akmal smashing a quick half-century (50 off 17 balls). Zalmi's middle order supported Akmal helping him finish on 77 Zalmi on 170 with Ravi Bopara taking the most wickets with 3-35. In response one of Karachi's openers, Joe Denly scored 79 not out from 46 and he was well supported by Babar Azam who made 63 off 46 before getting out to Hasan Ali in the end though Zalmi won by 13 runs and went through to the final. Sameen Gul was the pick of the bowlers conceding just 20.

=== Final ===
Final
25 March 2018
20:00
Scorecard

Peshawar Zalmi; 148/9 (20 overs)	v	Islamabad United; 154/7 (16.5 overs)
Chris Jordan 36 (26); Shadab Khan 3/25 (4 overs)		Luke Ronchi 52 (26); Chris Jordan 2/22 (3 overs)

Islamabad won by 3 wickets
National Stadium, Karachi
Umpires: Aleem Dar (Pak) and Shozab Raza (Pak)
Player of the match: Luke Ronchi (Islamabad United)

- Peshawar Zalmi won the toss and elected to bat.
- Islamabad United won the championship as a result of this match and became the most successful team in PSL history.

The final took place at National Stadium, Karachi, after the semi-finals which had taken place in Lahore, with it being the first high-profile match in the stadium in 10 years. Peshawar won the toss an elected to bat, there innings started badly with Kamran Akmal and Andre Flecher getting out cheaply. Mohammed Hafeez came in next but was soon back in the pavilion only scoring 8. Zalmi recovered with Liam Dawson and Chris Jordan both scoring thirties with Jordan scoring 36 and Dawson 33. After they both departed Zalmi's lower middle orde collapsed before a late onslaught from Wahab Riaz got Zalmi close to 150. The pick of the bowlers was Shahdab Khan with 3-25. In response Islamabad got off to a good start with Luke Ronchi and Sahibzada Farhan scoring big. Ronchi got his half-century before getting out on 52, while Farhan scored 44 before losing his wicket. With Islamabad near their target a middle order collapse followed with 5 batsman only contributing 20 runs. However, in the end 3 sixes in a row from Asif Ali got united over the line and gave them their second PSL title.

== Awards and statistics ==
=== Most runs ===
Player	Team	Mat	Inns	Runs	HS
Luke Ronchi	Islamabad United	11	11	435	94*
Kamran Akmal	Peshawar Zalmi	13	13	425	107*
Babar Azam	Karachi Kings	12	11	402	66
Joe Denly	Karachi Kings	12	11	323	79*
Shane Watson	Quetta Gladiators	10	10	319	90*
Source: ESPNcricinfo.com, Last updated : 25 March 2018

- Luke Ronchi of Islamabad United received the Green Cap for scoring the most runs.

=== Most wickets ===
Player	Team	Mat	Inns	Wkts	BBI
Faheem Ashraf	Islamabad United	12	12	18	3/19
Wahab Riaz	Peshawar Zalmi	13	13	18	3/30
Usman Khan	Karachi Kings	10	9	16	4/17
Rahat Ali	Quetta Gladiators	11	11	15	4/16
Samit Patel	Islamabad United	9	9	13	4/34
Source: ESPNcricinfo.com, Last updated : 25 March 2018

- Faheem Ashraf of Islamabad United received the Maroon Cap as he took the most wickets.

== See also ==
- Multan Sultans in 2018
- Peshawar Zalmi in 2018
