= List of Pakistan Super League umpires =

This is a list of Pakistan Super League umpires, officials who have stood as an on-field umpire in a cricket match during the Pakistan Super League. There are two on-field umpires who apply the laws, make decisions and relay the decisions to the scorers during a cricket match. The Pakistan Super League was established in 2016 as a franchise Twenty20 cricket league administered by the Pakistan Cricket Board. Seven umpires were announced prior to the first season. For the second and third season, names of eight umpires were announced.

== Key ==
Symbol	Meaning
First	Year of the first PSL match officiated
Last	Year of latest PSL match officiated
Matches	Total number of PSL matches officiated

== PSL umpires ==
Pakistan Super League umpires
Umpire	Nationality	First	Last	Matches
Aleem Dar	Pakistan	2016	2022	71
Shozab Raza	Pakistan	2016	2022	61
Rashid Riaz	Pakistan	2016	2022	48
Richard Illingworth	England	2017	2022	44
Ranmore Martinesz	Sri Lanka	2017	2020	41
Ahsan Raza	Pakistan	2016	2022	39
Asif Yaqoob	Pakistan	2017	2022	38
Michael Gough	England	2019	2022	29
Tim Robinson	England	2018	2018	15
Joel Wilson	West Indies	2016	2016	14
Faisal Afridi	Pakistan	2020	2022	12
Ahmed Shahab	Pakistan	2016	2018	10
Tariq Rasheed	Pakistan	2020	2020	8
Khalid Mahmood	Pakistan	2018	2018	3
Imran Javed	Pakistan	2021	2021	1
Imtiaz Iqbal	Pakistan	2022	2022	1
Waleed Yaqoob	Pakistan	2022	2022	1

Source: ESPNcricinfo, Last updated: 27 February 2022
