= List of Pakistan Super League bowling records =

Pakistan Super League is a professional Twenty20 cricket league, which is operated by Pakistan Cricket Board. It is contested by six franchises comprising cricketers from Pakistan and around the world.

In cricket, a dismissal occurs when the batsman is out (also known as the fielding team taking a wicket and/or the batting team losing a wicket). At this point a batsman must discontinue batting and leave the field permanently for the innings.

== Five-wicket hauls ==
In cricket, a five-wicket haul (also known as a "five-for" or "fifer") refers to a bowler taking five or more wickets in a single innings. This is regarded as a notable achievement.

Date	Bowler	Team	Overs	Bowling figures	Opposition	Venue	Result
12 February 2016	Ravi Bopara	Karachi Kings	4.0	6/16	Lahore Qalandars	Sharjah Cricket Stadium, Sharjah	Karachi won
14 February 2016	Shahid Afridi	Peshawar Zalmi	4.0	5/7	Quetta Gladiators	Sharjah Cricket Stadium, Sharjah	Peshawar won
20 February 2016	Mohammad Sami	Islamabad United	4.0	5/8	Karachi Kings	Dubai International Cricket Stadium, Dubai	Islamabad won
7 March 2018	Umar Gul	Multan Sultans	4.0	6/24	Quetta Gladiators	Dubai International Cricket Stadium, Dubai	Quetta won
9 March 2018	Shaheen Afridi	Lahore Qalandars	3.4	5/4	Multan Sultans	Dubai International Cricket Stadium, Dubai	Lahore won
9 March 2019	Faheem Ashraf	Islamabad United	4.0	6/19	Lahore Qalandars	National Stadium, Karachi	Islamabad won
10 June 2021	Rashid Khan	Lahore Qalandars	4.0	5/20	Peshawar Zalmi	Sheikh Zayed Cricket Stadium, Abu Dhabi	Lahore won
29 January 2022	Naseem Shah	Quetta Gladiators	3.3	5/20	Karachi Kings	National Stadium, Karachi	Quetta won
3 February 2022	Shadab Khan	Islamabad United	4.0	5/28	Quetta Gladiators	National Stadium, Karachi	Islamabad won
26 February 2023	Shaheen Afridi	Lahore Qalandars	4.0	5/40	Peshawar Zalmi	Gaddafi Stadium, Lahore	Lahore won
15 February 2023	Ihsanullah	Multan Sultans	4.0	5/12	Quetta Gladiators	Multan Cricket Stadium, Multan	Multan won
11 March 2023	Abbas Afridi	Multan Sultans	4.0	5/47	Quetta Gladiators	Rawalpindi Cricket Stadium, Rawalpindi	Multan won
26 February 2024	Arif Yaqoob	Peshawar Zalmi	4.0	5/27	Islamabad United	Gaddafi Stadium, Lahore	Peshawar Won
27 February 2024	Usama Mir	Multan Sultans	4.0	6/40	Lahore Qalandars	Gaddafi Stadium, Lahore	Multan Won
18 March 2024	Imad Wasim	Islamabad United	4.0	5/23	Multan Sultans	National Stadium, Karachi	Islamabad Won

== Hat-tricks ==
In cricket, a hat-trick occurs in when a bowler dismisses three batsmen with consecutive deliveries.

Date	Bowler	Team	Opposition	Venue	Result
5 February 2016	Mohammad Amir	Karachi Kings	Lahore Qalandars	Dubai International Cricket Stadium, Dubai	Karachi Won
23 February 2018	Junaid Khan	Multan Sultans	Lahore Qalandars	Dubai International Cricket Stadium, Dubai	Multan Won
3 March 2018	Imran Tahir	Multan Sultans	Quetta Gladiators	Sharjah Cricket Stadium, Sharjah	Multan Won
22 February 2019	Mohammad Sami	Islamabad United	Peshawar Zalmi	Sharjah Cricket Stadium, Sharjah	Islamabad won
11 March 2023	Abbas Afridi	Multan Sultans	Quetta Gladiators	Pindi Cricket Stadium, Rawalpindi	Multan Won
8 March 2024	Akeal Hosein	Quetta Gladiators	Peshawar Zalmi	Pindi Cricket Stadium, Rawalpindi	Peshwar Won

== Season overview ==
Season	5-wkt hauls		Hat-tricks		Ref.
Season	No.	Bowlers	No.	Bowlers	Ref.
2016	3	3	1	1	
2017	0	0	0	0	
2018	2	2	2	2	
2019	1	1	1	1	
2020	0	0	0	0	
2021	1	1	0	0	
2022	2	2	0	0	

== Team overview ==
Team	5-wkt hauls		Hat-tricks		Ref.
Team	No.	Bowlers	No.	Bowlers	Ref.
Islamabad United	3	3	1	1	
Karachi Kings	1	1	1	1	
Lahore Qalandars	2	2	0	0	
Multan Sultans	1	1	2	2	
Peshawar Zalmi	1	1	0	0	
Quetta Gladiators	1	1	0	0	

== See also ==
- List of Pakistan Super League cricketers
- List of Pakistan Super League records and statistics
