= 2018 Lahore Qalandars season =

Cricket team in the Pakistan Super League

Lahore Qalandars
2018 season
- Coach: Aaqib Javed
- Captain: Brendon McCullum
- PSL 2018: 6th
- Most runs: Fakhar Zaman (277)
- Most wickets: Yasir Shah (11)

The Lahore Qalandars cricket team is one of six teams that competed in the 2018 Pakistan Super League, representing Lahore, Punjab.

Team management retained Brendon McCullum as their captain. They finished sixth in the season after winning only three of their ten matches, and as a result, were eliminated in the group stage for the third consecutive year.

== Squad ==
- Players with international caps shown in **bold**
- Ages given as of the first match of the season, 22 February 2018

No.	Name	Nationality	Birth date	Batting style	Bowling style	Year signed	Notes
Batsmen
12	Cameron Delport	South Africa	12 May 1989 (aged 28)	Left-handed	Right-arm medium	2018	Overseas
39	**Fakhar Zaman**	Pakistan	10 April 1990 (aged 27)	Left-handed	Left-arm orthodox spin	2018	Vice-captain
42	**Brendon McCullum**	New Zealand	27 September 1981 (aged 36)	Right-handed	Right-arm medium	2018	Captain; Overseas
50	**Chris Lynn**	Australia	10 April 1990 (aged 27)	Right-handed	Slow left-arm orthodox	2018	Overseas
100	Sohail Akhtar	Pakistan	2 March 1986 (aged 31)	Right-handed	Right-arm medium	2018	
All-rounders
24	Agha Salman	Pakistan	23 November 1993 (aged 24)	Right-handed	Right-arm off break	2018	
29	**Anton Devcich**	New Zealand	28 September 1985 (aged 32)	Left-handed	Slow left-arm orthodox	2018	Overseas
31	Bilal Asif	Pakistan	24 September 1985 (aged 32)	Right-handed	Right-arm off break	2018	
35	**Aamer Yamin**	Pakistan	26 June 1990 (aged 27)	Right-handed	Right-arm medium-fast	2017	
51	**Bilawal Bhatti**	Pakistan	17 September 1991 (aged 26)	Right-handed	Right-arm fast	2018	
66	**Angelo Mathews**	Sri Lanka	2 June 1987 (aged 30)	Right-handed	Right-arm medium	2018	Overseas
75	**Sunil Narine**	West Indies	26 May 1988 (aged 29)	Left-handed	Right-arm off spin	2018	Overseas
Wicket-keepers
15	Gulraiz Sadaf	Pakistan	27 December 1989 (aged 28)	Right-handed	—	2018	
33	**Denesh Ramdin**	West Indies	13 March 1985 (aged 32)	Right-handed	—	2018	Overseas
96	**Umar Akmal**	Pakistan	26 May 1990 (aged 27)	Right-handed	Right-arm off spin	2018	
Bowlers
10	Shaheen Afridi	Pakistan	6 April 2000 (aged 17)	Left-handed	Left-arm fast	2018	
14	**Sohail Khan**	Pakistan	6 March 1984 (aged 33)	Right-handed	Right-arm fast	2018	
21	Ghulam Mudassar	Pakistan	20 October 1999 (aged 18)	Right-handed	Left-arm fast-medium	2018	
57	**Kyle Abbott**	South Africa	18 June 1987 (aged 30)	Right-handed	Right-arm fast-medium	2018	Overseas
64	**Imran Khan**	Pakistan	14 July 1988 (aged 29)	Right-handed	Left-arm medium-fast	2018	
81	**Mitchell McClenaghan**	New Zealand	11 June 1986 (aged 31)	Left-handed	Left-arm fast-medium	2018	Overseas
86	**Yasir Shah**	Pakistan	2 May 1986 (aged 31)	Right-handed	Right-arm leg spin	2018	
90	**Mustafizur Rahman**	Bangladesh	6 September 1995 (aged 22)	Left-handed	Left-arm fast	2018	Overseas
99	Salman Irshad	Pakistan	12 March 1995 (aged 22)	Right-handed	Right-arm fast	2018	
888	**Raza Hasan**	Pakistan	8 July 1992 (aged 25)	Right-handed	Slow left-arm orthodox	2018	

== Kit manufacturers and sponsors ==
Kit manufacturer	Shirt sponsor (chest)	Shirt sponsor (back)	Chest branding	Sleeve branding
Millat Sports	Ecostar	Gree	Geo News	Bank of Punjab, ZXMCO, Royal Palm

Playing kit

== Season standings ==
=== Points table ===
Pos	Team	Pld	W	L	NR	Pts	NRR
1	Islamabad United (C)	10	7	3	0	14	0.296
2	Karachi Kings (3rd)	10	5	4	1	11	0.028
3	Peshawar Zalmi (R)	10	5	5	0	10	0.464
4	Quetta Gladiators (4th)	10	5	5	0	10	0.312
5	Multan Sultans	10	4	5	1	9	−0.191
6	Lahore Qalandars	10	3	7	0	6	−0.931

Source: ESPNcricinfo
- The top 4 teams qualified for the playoffs
- Advanced to Qualifier
- Advanced to Eliminator 1

== Season summary ==
Before, 2018 PSL players draft, team management had to retain maximum of ten players in their squad, and they retained Sunil Narine, Umar Akmal, Brendon McCullum, Yasir Shah, Sohail Khan, Cameron Delport, Aamer Yamin, Bilawal Bhatti and previous season's leading runs-scorer for the team Fakhar Zaman. Ghulam Mudassar was retained as team's emerging player.

At the players draft, held in Lahore, they managed to picked some good local and International players in their squad. Australia's Explosive opener, Chris Lynn was their first pick of the night, along with Angelo Mathews, Mitchell McClenaghan and Mustafizur Rahman and Pakistani players like Shaheen Afridi and Bilal Asif were also picked. However, few days before the season started, it was announced that Chris Lynn has suffered a shoulder injury, therefore, he was unavailable for the entire season. He was replaced by South Africa's Kyle Abbott.
