= Mohammad Junaid =

Mohammad Junaid is a given name, or a given name and a surname, of Arabic origin. It may refer to the following notable people:

- Mohammad Junaid Khan (born 1989), Pakistani cricket coach and former cricketer
- Mohammad Junaid (cricketer) (born 2002), Pakistani cricketer
- Mohammad Junaid Siddique (born 1987), Bangladeshi cricketer
- Mohammad Junaid (Hazara cricketer)
