= Mohammad Junaid (cricketer) =

Pakistani cricketer (born 2002)

Personal information
- Born: 21 March 2002 (age 24)
- Batting: Left-handed
- Bowling: Slow Left-arm orthodox

Domestic team information
- Years: Team
- 2019: Multan Sultans
- Source: Cricinfo, 22 September 2020

Mohammad Junaid (born 21 March 2002) is a Pakistani cricketer. He made his Twenty20 debut for Peshawar in the 2018–19 National T20 Cup on 13 December 2018. A month before his T20 debut, he was named as the emerging player for the Multan Sultans in the draft for the 2019 Pakistan Super League. He made his List A debut on 24 January 2021, for Balochistan, in the 2020–21 Pakistan Cup. Junaid made his first-class debut for the Higher Education Commission against WAPDA at Karachi on 22 December 2023.
