= Ibtisam Sheikh =

Pakistani cricketer (born 1998)

Personal information
- Born: 16 March 1998 (age 27); Hyderabad, Sindh, Pakistan
- Batting: Left-handed
- Bowling: Leg spin
- Role: Bowler

Domestic team information
- Years: Team
- 2018–2019: Peshawar Zalmi
- Source: Cricinfo, 10 October 2017

Ibtisam Sheikh (born 16 March 1998) is a Pakistani cricketer. He made his first-class debut for Faisalabad in the 2017–18 Quaid-e-Azam Trophy on 9 October 2017. He made his Twenty20 debut for Peshawar Zalmi in the 2018 Pakistan Super League on 22 February 2018.
