= Faraz Ahmed =

Pakistani cricketer (born 1984)

Personal information
- Born: 16 October 1984 (age 42); Karachi, Pakistan

Domestic team information
- Years: Team
- unknown–2015: Karachi Dolphins
- 2018–: Quetta Gladiators
- Source: Cricinfo, 13 November 2017

Faraz Ahmed (born 16 October 1984) is a Pakistani first-class cricketer who plays for Karachi cricket team. In November 2017, he was selected to play for the Quetta Gladiators in 2018 Pakistan Super League players draft.
