= 2018 Peshawar Zalmi season =

Overview of Peshawar Zalmi in 2018

Peshawar Zalmi
2018 season
- Coach: Mohammad Akram
- Captain: Darren Sammy
- PSL 2018: Runners-up
- Most runs: Kamran Akmal (425)
- Most wickets: Wahab Riaz (18)

The Peshawar Zalmi is a franchise cricket team that represents Peshawar in the Pakistan Super League (PSL). They are one of the five original teams of the PSL. After the Multan Sultans joined the league, the league was expanded to six teams that took part in the 2018 Pakistan Super League. They defeated Quetta Gladiators in the final to win their maiden PSL title and making them defending champion in 2018.

Hasan Ali did not play the first four games but joined in the fifth to take 3 wickets. Darren Sammy was injured against Quetta Gladiators, but soon returned. They finished as Runners-up in the competition after defending the title against Islamabad United in the Final.

== Squad ==
Shahid Afridi was traded to the Karachi Kings during off season, in return for one Gold and two Silver picks during the draft. This has been named as the biggest trade of the season. Iftikhar Ahmed was traded to the Islamabad United in exchange for supplementary pick in second round of draft.

== Kit manufacturers and sponsors ==
Kit manufacturer	Shirt sponsor (chest)	Shirt sponsor (back)	Chest branding	Sleeve branding
Zalmi in-house	Haier	RD	MGI	McDonald's Pakistan, Dawn News, Jang, Zamoong

Playing kit
