= Gulraiz Sadaf =

Pakistani cricketer (born 1989)

Personal information
- Full name: Gulraiz Sadaf
- Born: 27 December 1989 (age 36); Burewala, Pakistan
- Batting: Right-handed
- Role: Wicketkeeper

Domestic team information
- Years: Team
- 2007–2015: Multan Tigers
- 2018: Lahore Qalandars
Medal record
Men's Cricket
Representing Pakistan
South Asian Games
Bronze medal – third place	2010 Dhaka	Team
- Source: Cricinfo, 14 November 2017

Gulraiz Sadaf (born 27 December 1989) is a Pakistani first-class cricketer who plays for Multan cricket team.
