= 2018 Multan Sultans season =

Multan Sultans
2018 season
- Coach: Tom Moody
- Captain: Shoaib Malik
- PSL 2018: 5th
- Most runs: Kumar Sangakkara (269)
- Most wickets: Imran Tahir (13)

The Multan Sultans is a franchise cricket team that will represent Multan in the Pakistan Super League. They are the sixth team to join the league. 2018 was their inaugural season. After the league was started in 2016, this was the first expansion of the league. Tom Moody serves as their coach. They finished as the fifth placed team after the league stage ended and failed to qualify for the playoffs.

== Squad ==
- Players with international caps are shown in **bold**
- Ages are given as of the first match of the season, 22 February 2018

No.	Name	Nationality	Birth date	Batting style	Bowling style	Year signed	Notes
Batsmen
6	Saif Badar	Pakistan	3 July 1998 (aged 19)	Right-handed	Right-arm leg break, googly	2018	
19	**Ahmed Shehzad**	Pakistan	23 November 1991 (aged 26)	Right-handed	Right-arm leg break	2018	
30	**Shan Masood**	Pakistan	14 October 1989 (aged 28)	Left-handed	Right-arm medium-fast	2018	
46	**Darren Bravo**	West Indies	6 February 1989 (aged 29)	Left-handed	Right-arm medium	2018	Overseas
92	**Sohaib Maqsood**	Pakistan	15 April 1987 (aged 30)	Right-handed	Right-arm off break	2018	
93	Abdullah Shafique	Pakistan	20 November 1999 (aged 18)	Right-handed	Right-arm off break	2018	
94	Umar Siddiq	Pakistan	30 December 1992 (aged 25)	Left-handed	Right-arm off break	2018	
All-rounders
55	**Kieron Pollard**	West Indies	12 May 1987 (aged 30)	Right-handed	Right-arm medium-fast	2018	Overseas
18	**Shoaib Malik**	Pakistan	1 February 1982 (aged 36)	Right-handed	Right-arm off break	2018	Captain
33	**Sohail Tanvir**	Pakistan	12 December 1984 (aged 33)	Left-handed	Left-arm medium-fast	2018	
44	Ross Whiteley	England	13 September 1988 (aged 29)	Left-handed	Left-arm medium	2018	Overseas
45	Kashif Bhatti	Pakistan	25 July 1986 (aged 31)	Left-handed	slow L orthodox	2018	
Wicket-keepers
11	**Kumar Sangakkara**	Sri Lanka	27 October 1977 (aged 40)	Left-handed	—	2018	Overseas
29	**Nicholas Pooran**	West Indies	2 October 1995 (aged 22)	Left-handed	—	2018	Overseas
Bowlers
7	**Hardus Viljoen**	South Africa	6 March 1989 (aged 28)	Right-handed	Right-arm fast	2018	Overseas
12	**Junaid Khan**	Pakistan	24 December 1989 (aged 28)	Right-handed	Left-arm fast	2018	
26	**Mohammad Abbas**	Pakistan	10 March 1990 (aged 27)	Right-handed	Right-arm fast-medium	2018	
27	**Mohammad Irfan**	Pakistan	6 June 1982 (aged 35)	Right-handed	Left-arm fast	2018	
55	**Umar Gul**	Pakistan	14 April 1984 (aged 33)	Right-handed	Right-arm fast-medium	2018	
99	**Imran Tahir**	South Africa	27 March 1979 (aged 38)	Right-handed	Right-arm leg break	2018	Overseas
	Irfan Khan	Pakistan	1 August 1989 (aged 28)	Right-handed	leg break	2018	
	Zahir Khan	Afghanistan	20 December 1998 (aged 19)	Left-handed	Slow left-arm wrist-spin	2018	Overseas

== Kit manufacturers and sponsors ==
Shirt sponsor (chest)	Shirt sponsor (back)	Chest branding	Sleeve branding
Lake City	Fatima Group	Mughal Steel	Inverex, Super Asia

Playing kit
