= Tim Robinson (English cricketer) =

English cricket umpire and former cricketer

Personal information
- Full name: Robert Timothy Robinson
- Born: 21 November 1958 (age 67); Sutton-in-Ashfield, Nottinghamshire, England
- Nickname: Robbo, Chop
- Batting: Right-handed
- Bowling: Right-arm medium
- Role: Batsman, umpire

International information
- National side: England (1984–1989)
- Test debut (cap 511): 28 November 1984 v India
- Last Test: 27 July 1989 v Australia
- ODI debut (cap 76): 5 December 1984 v India
- Last ODI: 4 September 1988 v Sri Lanka

Domestic team information
- Years: Team
- 1978–1999: Nottinghamshire

Umpiring information
- ODIs umpired: 18 (2013–2021)
- T20Is umpired: 12 (2013–2018)
- WODIs umpired: 10 (2002–2019)
- WT20Is umpired: 6 (2011–2021)

Career statistics
Competition	Test	ODI	FC	LA
Matches	29	26	425	398
Runs scored	1,601	597	27,571	11,889
Batting average	36.38	22.96	42.15	34.36
100s/50s	4/6	0/3	63/141	9/75
Top score	175	83	220*	139
Balls bowled	6	–	259	–
Wickets	0	–	4	–
Bowling average	–	–	72.25	–
5 wickets in innings	–	–	0	–
10 wickets in match	–	–	0	–
Best bowling	–	–	1/22	–
Catches/stumpings	8/–	6/–	257/0	120/–
Medal record
Men's Cricket
Representing England
ICC Cricket World Cup
Runner-up	1987 India and Pakistan
- Source: CricInfo, 4 July 2021

Robert Timothy Robinson (born 21 November 1958) is an English cricket umpire and former cricketer who played in 29 Test matches and 26 One Day Internationals for England from 1984 to 1989. He was a part of the English squad which finished as runners-up at the 1987 Cricket World Cup.

Born in Sutton-in-Ashfield, Nottinghamshire, Robinson played for Nottinghamshire from 1978 to 1999, receiving his first team cap in 1983. Robinson was club captain between 1988 and 1995, and was one of the Wisden Cricketers of the Year in 1986. Robinson was educated at High Pavement Grammar School in Nottingham.

== International career ==
Robinson was an opener. He made a promising start to his England career, with 160 in the second Test in 1984–85 against India in Delhi, and two big centuries against Australia in the 1985 Ashes series. However, he was found out, as were many other England batsmen, by the West Indies pace attack in the 1985–86 series, when he managed just 72 runs in eight innings. Robinson returned to form with 166 against Pakistan the following year.

He toured with England in 1987–88 playing in the 1987 Cricket World Cup and tours of Pakistan, Australia and New Zealand. It was a disappointing season for Robinson, whose World Cup is probably most memorable for being out lbw first ball to Craig McDermott in the final. In Australia for the Bicentennial Test at Sydney, Robinson was again exposed for his inability to handle short balls.

He played one undistinguished Test match against Sri Lanka at the end of the 1988 English summer, where his inability against pace bowling was evident, as he was bounced out by Sri Lanka's medium pace attack. By now, it was apparent that his temperament for facing short pitched fast bowling had waned. England did not tour in 1988–89, due to a row between the Indian and English cricket boards over Graham Gooch's South African connections.

Robinson played in his final Test match against Australia at Old Trafford in 1989. Before the game had concluded, it was announced that Robinson was in a proposed party of sixteen players to join that coming winter's rebel tour to South Africa.

== Domestic career ==
Robinson continued to play county cricket until 1999. He played a total of 425 first-class matches, scoring 27,571 runs at an average of 42.15, and amassing 63 centuries. He also bowled a maiden over in a Test match (his only outing at that level with ball in hand). He was Nottinghamshire's captain when they won the Benson and Hedges Cup in 1989, making his team's top score in the final.

== Umpiring career ==
Robinson was appointed to the ECB First-Class Umpires List in 2007. His first international match was England vs New Zealand in 2013.

In January 2018, he was named as one of the seventeen on-field umpires for the 2018 Under-19 Cricket World Cup.

== See also ==
- List of One Day International cricket umpires
- List of Twenty20 International cricket umpires

Sporting positions
Preceded by Clive Rice	Nottinghamshire County cricket captain 1988–1995	Succeeded by Paul Johnson
