= Mohammad Irfan (cricketer, born August 1989) =

Pakistani cricketer (born 1989)

Personal information
- Born: 1 August 1989 (age 37); Bajour Agency Khyber Pakhtunkhwa
- Batting: Right-handed
- Bowling: Leg break
- Role: Bowler

Domestic team information
- Years: Team
- 2014–2015: FATA Cheetas
- 2017: Peshawar Zalmi
- 2017–Present: Khulna Titans
- 2018–2019: Multan Sultans
- Source: Cricinfo, 11 October 2017

Mohammad Irfan (born 1 August 1989) is a Pakistani first-class cricketer who plays for FATA Cheetas. He made his first-class debut for FATA against WAPDA at Sialkot on 16 November 2015. On debut, he claimed 4/129 in his 30.2 overs in WAPDA's only innings of the match.

In April 2018, he was named in Baluchistan's squad for the 2018 Pakistan Cup.
