= Ahmed Shahab =

Pakistani cricket umpire (born 1969)

Personal information
- Born: 1 May 1969 (age 57); Lahore, Pakistan
- Role: Umpire

Umpiring information
- ODIs umpired: 4 (2015)
- T20Is umpired: 9 (2014–2018)
- WODIs umpired: 4 (2015)
- WT20Is umpired: 7 (2014–2017)
- Source: ESPNcricinfo, 2 April 2018

Ahmed Shahab (born 1 May 1969) is a Pakistani cricket umpire. He made his international umpiring debut on 4 December 2014 in the first Twenty20 International match between Pakistan and New Zealand in the United Arab Emirates. He made his One Day International umpiring debut on 10 January 2015 in a match between Afghanistan and Ireland in the Dubai Triangular Series in the UAE.

== See also ==
- List of One Day International cricket umpires
- List of Twenty20 International cricket umpires
