= Liam Dawson =

English cricketer (born 1990)

Personal information
- Full name: Liam Andrew Dawson
- Born: 1 March 1990 (age 36); Swindon, Wiltshire, England
- Nickname: Daws, Lemmy
- Height: 5 ft 8 in (1.73 m)
- Batting: Right-handed
- Bowling: Slow left-arm orthodox
- Role: All rounder

International information
- National side: England (2016–present)
- Test debut (cap 676): 16 December 2016 v India
- Last Test: 23 July 2025 v India
- ODI debut (cap 244): 4 September 2016 v Pakistan
- Last ODI: 18 November 2026 v Australia
- ODI shirt no.: 83
- T20I debut (cap 76): 5 July 2016 v Sri Lanka
- Last T20I: 19 September 2026 v Sri Lanka
- T20I shirt no.: 83

Domestic team information
- Years: Team
- 2007–present: Hampshire (squad no. 8)
- 2011–2012: Mountaineers
- 2013: Prime Bank Cricket Club
- 2014: Sheikh Jamal Dhanmondi Club
- 2015: → Essex (on loan)
- 2016: Rangpur Riders
- 2017: Chittagong Vikings
- 2018–2020: Peshawar Zalmi (squad no. 7)
- 2018/19: Comilla Victorians
- 2021: Southern Brave
- 2022: Islamabad United (squad no. 83)
- 2022–2025: London Spirit
- 2023: Lahore Qalandars
- 2023/24: Melbourne Stars
- 2023/24: Sunrisers Eastern Cape
- 2024: Gulf Giants
- 2026: Manchester Super Giants

Career statistics
Competition	Test	ODI	T20I	FC
Matches	4	17	39	218
Runs scored	110	141	79	10,828
Batting average	22.00	12.81	11.28	34.48
100s/50s	0/1	0/1	0/0	18/56
Top score	66*	68	34	171
Balls bowled	898	798	697	25,914
Wickets	8	24	40	380
Bowling average	54.75	28.00	22.72	32.31
5 wickets in innings	0	0	0	15
10 wickets in match	0	0	0	3
Best bowling	2/34	4/49	4/20	7/51
Catches/stumpings	2/–	6/–	13/–	208/–
Medal record
Men's Cricket
Representing England
ICC Cricket World Cup
Winner	2019 England and Wales
ICC T20 World Cup
Winner	2022 Australia
Runner-up	2016 India
- Source: ESPNcricinfo, 18 November 2026

Liam Andrew Dawson (born 1 March 1990) is an English cricketer who plays for Hampshire and for the England cricket team. He is a right-handed batsman who bowls slow left-arm orthodox spin. He made his international debut for England in July 2016, and has since played all three formats of the game for England. Dawson was part of the England squad that won the 2019 Cricket World Cup, however, he did not play in any matches during the tournament.

== Early career ==
Dawson started playing cricket at the age of 3 and joined Goatacre when he was 7. He then moved on to play his youth cricket at Chippenham Cricket Club in Wiltshire, where he was spotted by Hampshire.

After appearing regularly for Hampshire Second XI and Wiltshire in 2006, Dawson was selected for England under-19s tour of Malaysia in 2006/07. During the tour, he took impressive figures of 6/9 against Malaysia. During England under-19s Test series with Pakistan in 2007, he was England's leading wicket-taker.

== Domestic and T20 franchise career ==
Dawson appeared in three List A matches for Hampshire towards the end of the 2007 season. He failed to take a wicket but he scored a run-a-ball 32 on his debut. On 19 September 2007, he made his first-class debut against Yorkshire, although he did not bat or bowl.

Dawson scored his maiden century at Trent Bridge against Nottinghamshire in 2008. In January 2009, he was called into the England Lions squad to tour New Zealand. Dawson was a member of Hampshire's 2009 Friends Provident Trophy winning team. In 2010, he played just eight Championship matches, averaging 29 with the bat. In 2011, he averaged 36 in the Championship. He averaged 35 in List A games as he began to build a reputation for himself as a solid batsman.

In 2012, Dawson's bowling began to become more prominent, as he picked up 26 wickets for Hampshire in the County Championship, averaging 32. However, his batting regressed as he averaged less than 30 in the season. He also became an important part of Hampshire's bowling line-up in the T20's, taking nine wickets.

In 2013, Dawson scored over 1,000 first-class runs for the first time in his career, although he was less effective with the ball, taking just eleven Championship wickets. However, his bowling in One Day cricket became more effective as he took 12 List A wickets, the most in his career. He continued his impressive performances with the ball in T20 cricket, taking a further 13 wickets. In 2015, after falling out of favour at Hampshire, Dawson moved to Essex on loan. Dawson performed well during the loan, and when he returned to Hampshire, he reclaimed his spot in the side. In 2015, he took 29 wickets in the Championship, and 12 in List A cricket as his bowling continued to improve.

In October 2018, Dawson was named in the squad for the Comilla Victorians team, following the draft for the 2018–19 Bangladesh Premier League. In April 2022, he was bought by the London Spirit for the 2022 season of The Hundred.

In June 2023, Dawson scored 141 and took 12 wickets during a match against Middlesex. In doing so he became the fourth Hampshire player in their history to achieve a century and ten wickets in the same match. He ended the County Championship season with 49 wickets at an average of 20 and scored 840 runs at 40. He topped the Professional Cricketers' Association rankings for Domestic MVP and the County Championship Player of the Year. He also achieved his best List A figures when taking 7/15 in the 2023 One-Day Cup semi-final against Warwickshire.

In 2024, Dawson again achieved the feat of a century and ten wickets in a match when scoring 104 not out and taking 10/99 against Lancashire. Over the course of the season, he scored 1,280 runs and picked up 71 wickets across all formats including a best season tally of 54 wickets in the County Championship. He retained the PCA MVP and the County Championship Player of the Year awards. He was also voted by his fellow professionals as the PCA 2024 Men's Player of the Year. Dawson won the County Championship Player of the Year at the 2024 Cricket Writers' Club Awards.

Dawson signed a new three-year contract with Hampshire in January 2025. He was named as one of the 2025 Wisden Cricketers of the Year.

== International career ==
In 2016, Dawson earned his first call up to a senior international squad when he was selected for England's squad for the 2016 ICC World Twenty20, although he didn't play a game for the side.

On 5 July 2016, Dawson made his Twenty20 International (T20I) debut for England against Sri Lanka.

On 4 September 2016, Dawson made his One Day International (ODI) debut for England against Pakistan. He scored ten runs and took figures of 2-70.

In November 2016, Dawson was named in England's Test squad for the final two matches of the series against India. He made his Test debut on 16 December 2016 against India in the fifth Test of the series. He scored an unbeaten 66 in his maiden innings, as England made 477. Murali Vijay was his first Test wicket, after he trapped him lbw, as he finished with figures of 2–129.

Dawson played in the second T20I against India, and took figures of 0–20 after opening the bowling.

On 6 July 2017, Dawson was called up to the England squad for the South Africa Test series and was selected to play as the second spinner on the side. He took four wickets and scored a pair of two-ball ducks.

On 21 May 2019, England finalised their squad for the 2019 Cricket World Cup, with Dawson named in the 15 man squad. He was one of two players, along with Tom Curran, who were unused as England won the tournament.

On 27 July 2020, Dawson was named in England's squad for the ODI series against Ireland.

In September 2021, Dawson was named as one of three travelling reserves in England's squad for the 2021 ICC Men's T20 World Cup, though he played no part in the tournament. He was recalled to the full T20I squad for the England tour of West Indies in 2022.

In June 2025, Dawson was re-called to the England T20 squad for the home series against the West Indies, and took an international-career best of 4–20 in 4 overs in the first T20I.

In July 2025, Dawson was re-called to the England Test squad for the fourth Test of the India series, replacing the injured Shoaib Bashir. He was then dropped for the fifth Test at The Oval.

He was included in the squad for the 2026 T20 World Cup.

On 13 May 2026, Dawson announced his retirement from first class cricket, in order to extend his T20 and ODI career.
