= Faheem Ashraf =

Pakistani cricketer

Personal information
- Born: 16 January 1994 (age 32); Phool Nagar, Punjab, Pakistan
- Nickname: Yoyo
- Height: 5 ft 11 in (180 cm)
- Batting: Left-handed
- Bowling: Right-arm medium
- Role: Bowling all-rounder

International information
- National side: Pakistan (2017–present)
- Test debut (cap 230): 11 May 2018 v Ireland
- Last Test: 14 December 2023 v Australia
- ODI debut (cap 213): 12 June 2017 v Sri Lanka
- Last ODI: 15 March 2026 v Bangladesh
- T20I debut (cap 75): 12 September 2017 v World XI
- Last T20I: 21 February 2026 v New Zealand

Domestic team information
- Years: Team
- 2013/14–2014/15: Faisalabad
- 2015/16: National Bank
- 2016/17–2018/19: Habib Bank Limited
- 2018–2024: Islamabad United
- 2019: Northamptonshire
- 2019/20–2022/23: Central Punjab
- 2019/20: Dhaka Platoon
- 2022: Sussex
- 2022/23: Hobart Hurricanes
- 2023/24–: Faisalabad
- 2024: Khulna Tigers
- 2024: Lahore Qalandars
- 2025: Fortune Barishal
- 2025: Quetta Gladiators
- 2026: Islamabad United
- 2026: Yorkshire

Career statistics
Competition	Test	ODI	T20I	FC
Matches	17	45	85	79
Runs scored	687	410	594	3,174
Batting average	26.42	14.64	13.50	29.94
100s/50s	0/4	0/1	0/1	4/15
Top score	91	73	51	147
Balls bowled	1,908	1,726	1,173	11,064
Wickets	25	33	61	183
Bowling average	39.64	45.69	25.22	31.55
5 wickets in innings	0	1	0	7
10 wickets in match	0	0	0	0
Best bowling	3/42	5/22	4/23	6/65
Catches/stumpings	5/–	11/–	25/–	40/–
- Source: Cricinfo, 9 July 2026

Faheem Ashraf (Punjabi: رانا فہیم اشرف; born 16 January 1994) is a Pakistani international cricketer who represents the Pakistan national team and plays first-class cricket for Faisalabad.

In August 2018, he was one of 33 players to be awarded a central contract for the 2018–19 season by the Pakistan Cricket Board (PCB).

Faheem Ashraf is the first Pakistani to take a hat-trick in the T20 format of the game.

== Early life and career ==
He was born into a Punjabi Rajput family in Phool Nagar, a town located in Kasur, Punjab. His father Rana Muhammad Ashraf is an influential lawyer.

He has two sisters and six brothers.

Faheem began his professional cricket journey in 2010 by playing in the inter-district Under-19 competition in the Faisalabad region. Later, he played for the Faisalabad Under-19 team before being remarked in 2013, when he played at senior district-level tournament for Kasur, eventually joining the Faisalabad team for the 2013–14 Quaid-e-Azam Trophy.

== Domestic career ==
Faheem scored a century on his first-class debut in 2013–14. He was the leading wicket-taker in the 2016–17 Departmental One Day Cup, taking 19 wickets. He was also the leading wicket-taker for Punjab in the 2017 Pakistan Cup, with eight dismissals in four matches.

In September 2019, he was named in Central Punjab's squad for the 2019–20 Quaid-e-Azam Trophy tournament.

== International career ==
In March 2017, Faheem was named in Pakistan's One Day International (ODI) squad for their series against the West Indies, although he did not play. In April 2017, he was named in Pakistan's ODI squad for the 2017 ICC Champions Trophy.

In an ICC Champions Trophy warm-up match against Bangladesh, Ashraf scored 64 runs in Pakistan's two-wicket win. He made his ODI debut for Pakistan against Sri Lanka in the Champions Trophy on 12 June 2017, dismissing Dinesh Chandimal for his first ODI wicket.

He made his Twenty20 International (T20I) debut for Pakistan against a World XI in the 2017 Independence Cup on 12 September 2017.

On 27 October 2017, he took a hat-trick for Pakistan in the second T20I match against Sri Lanka at the Sheikh Zayed Cricket Stadium, Abu Dhabi helping team seal a series lead and became the first bowler for Pakistan, and sixth player overall, to take a hat-trick in a T20I.

In April 2018, he was named in Pakistan's Test squad for their tours to Ireland and England in May 2018. He made his Test debut for Pakistan, against Ireland, on 11 May 2018. Ashraf scored 83 on debut against Ireland, followed by a quick 37 off 38 balls at Lord's in the 1st Test against England, and later took 3 for 60 at Headingley, in the 2nd Test against England, Pakistan's best bowling performance in an innings defeat.

In July 2018, he took his first five-wicket haul in ODIs, against Zimbabwe, at the Queens Sports Club in Bulawayo. The following month, he was named the PCB's Emerging Player of the Year.

In April 2019, he was named in Pakistan's squad for the 2019 Cricket World Cup. However, on 20 May 2019, he was dropped from Pakistan's squad, after they announced their final team for the tournament.

In June 2020, he was named in a 29-man squad for Pakistan's tour to England during the COVID-19 pandemic. In July, he was shortlisted in Pakistan's 20-man squad for the Test matches against England.

In January 2021, he was named in Pakistan's Test squad for their series against South Africa. In the first Test, Ashraf scored 64 with the bat.

In March 2022, during Pakistan's home Test series against Australia, Ashraf bowled a disciplined spell that contributed to creating early wicket-taking opportunities. His consistent line and movement were noted by commentators as helping maintain pressure on the Australian batting lineup, even on pitches offering limited assistance to bowlers.

In October 2025, in the second home T20I against South Africa, he earned his best T20I bowling figures, 4/23 in 3.2 overs. In the third and last T20I he took 2/28, and was declared Player of the Series for his six wickets.

== T20 franchise career ==
=== PSL career ===
In November 2017, he was drafted in by Islamabad United from Gold category (earning between US$50,000-US$60,000) in the 2018 Pakistan Super League players draft. Faheem played an integral part in team's winning the 2018 season. Faheem took 18 wickets and scored runs in crucial moments for his side. He was the leading wicket-taker of the tournament and won the best bowler of the season award at the end of the season along with a maroon cap.

In December 2021, he was signed by Islamabad United following the players' draft for the 2022 Pakistan Super League.

On 11 February 2026, Islamabad United signed Ashraf for PKR 8.50 crore, making him the second-most expensive signing in the first-ever Pakistan Super League auction.

=== Other leagues ===
In September 2018, he was named in Paktia's squad in the first edition of the Afghanistan Premier League tournament.

In July 2022, he was signed by the Galle Gladiators for the third edition of the Lanka Premier League.

In August 2022, he was signed by Hobart Hurricanes for BBL 12.

Faheem Ashraf was appointed captain of the Pakistan team for the Hong Kong Cricket Sixes 2024 tournament.

== Playing style ==
Faheem Ashraf is a seam-bowling all-rounder known for his control with the ball and lower-order batting contributions. In Test cricket, he has been described as providing Pakistan with an additional bowling option capable of maintaining consistent spells.

=== Bowling ===
Although not among the fastest bowlers in Pakistan's attack, he is noted for his ability to extract movement and maintain consistent lines, complementing the efforts of the frontline pacers. Before establishing himself in the national side, Ashraf was primarily used as a third or fourth seamer, contributing as a supporting option within Pakistan's bowling attack.

=== Batting ===
With the bat, Ashraf has been recognized for his attacking style in the lower order. He has played several important innings under pressure, including an unbeaten 78 against South Africa and a 91 in New Zealand, both scored in situations where Pakistan's top order had struggled. Before Pakistan's 2018 tour of Ireland and England, Ashraf worked extensively with coaches to improve his batting technique. During the series, he played measured innings at Malahide and Lord's. Having developed through Pakistan's tape-ball cricket system, Ashraf's style reflects the improvisational and attacking traits associated with that background.

== Controversy ==
=== Allegations of anti-Indian and anti-Hindu sentiments ===
During the 2025 Asia Cup, a few months after the Pahalgam attack, an Instagram story Ashraf posted, which included comments about India alongside an image of Bharat Mata and references to Hindus, was criticized by Indian social media users as anti-India and anti-Hindu.

== See also ==
- List of Twenty20 International cricket hat-tricks
