= Sameen Gul =

Pakistani cricketer (born 1999)

Personal information
- Full name: Sameen Gul Afridi
- Born: 4 February 1999 (age 27); Jamrud, Khyber Pakhtunkhwa, Pakistan
- Height: 6 ft 3 in (191 cm)
- Batting: Right-handed
- Bowling: Right-arm Medium
- Role: Bowler

Domestic team information
- Years: Team
- 2018-2019: Peshawar Zalmi (squad no. 14)
- 2023-Present: Multan Sultans
- Source: Cricinfo, 24 November 2017

Sameen Gul Afridi (born 4 February 1999) is a Pakistani cricketer who plays for United Bank Limited.

== Domestic career ==
He made his first-class debut on 30 November 2015 in the 2015–16 Quaid-e-Azam Trophy. In December 2015 he was named in Pakistan's squad for the 2016 Under-19 Cricket World Cup, where Pakistan reached the quarter-finals. He made his List A debut on 20 April 2016 for Khyber Pakhtunkhwa in the 2016 Pakistan Cup. He made his Twenty20 debut on 9 September 2016 for Federally Administered Tribal Areas in the 2016–17 National T20 Cup.

In April 2018, he was named in Khyber Pakhtunkhwa's squad for the 2018 Pakistan Cup. In December 2018, he was named in Pakistan's team for the 2018 ACC Emerging Teams Asia Cup. In March 2019, he was named in Federal Areas' squad for the 2019 Pakistan Cup.

In September 2019, he was named in Khyber Pakhtunkhwa's squad for the 2019–20 Quaid-e-Azam Trophy tournament.

In November 2019, he was named in Pakistan's squad for the 2019 ACC Emerging Teams Asia Cup in Bangladesh, where Pakistan became the champions after defeating Bangladesh by 77 runs in the final. Sameen Gul claimed the first wicket when Pakistan took the field in the final, removing opener and Bangladesh international Soumya Sarkar.
