= Luke Ronchi =

New Zealand-Australian cricketer (born 1981)

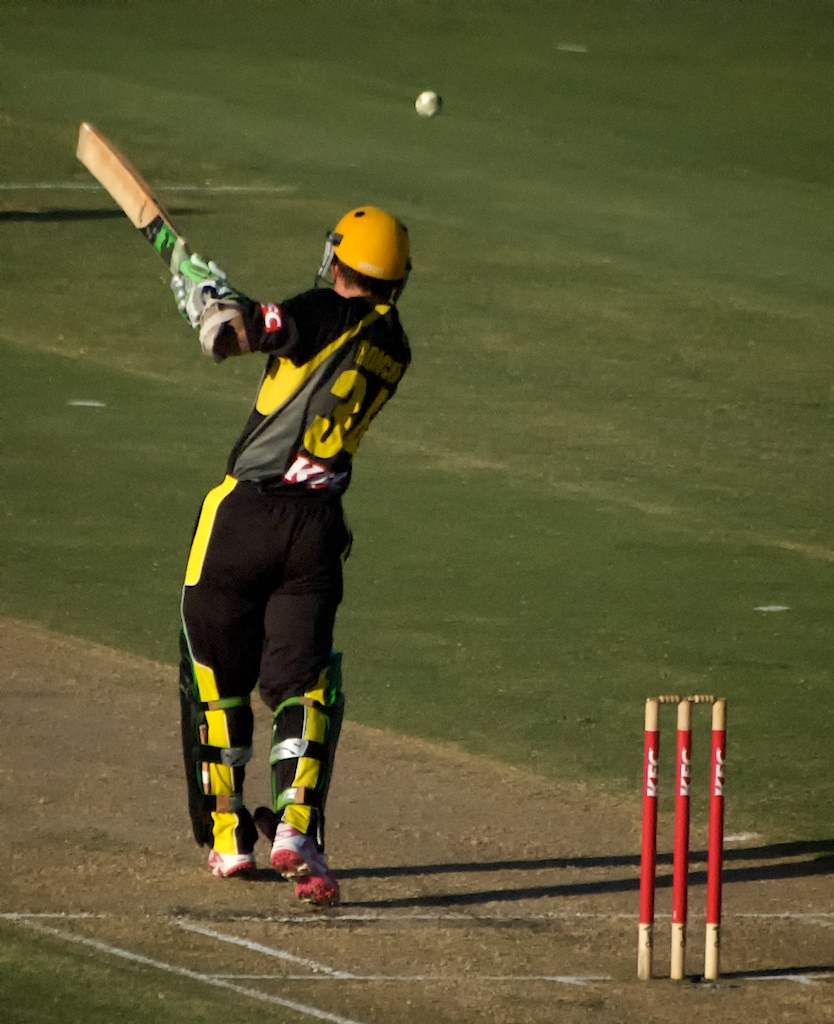
- Luke Ronchi batting for his domestic team

Personal information
- Born: 23 April 1981 (age 45); Dannevirke, New Zealand
- Nickname: Rock
- Height: 1.80 m (5 ft 11 in)
- Batting: Right-handed
- Role: Wicket-keeper, batsman

International information
- National sides: Australia (2008); New Zealand (2013–2017)
- Test debut (cap 267): 29 May 2015; New Zealand v England
- Last Test: 8 October 2016; New Zealand v India
- ODI debut (cap 166/180): 27 June 2008; Australia v West Indies
- Last ODI: 9 June 2017; New Zealand v Bangladesh
- ODI shirt no.: 54 (was 34 for Australia)
- T20I debut (cap 31/63): 15 October 2008; Australia v West Indies
- Last T20I: 31 May 2018; World XI v West Indies

Domestic team information
- Years: Team
- 2001/02–2011/12: Western Australia
- 2002: Hampshire Cricket Board
- 2008–2009: Mumbai Indians
- 2011/12–2012/13: Perth Scorchers
- 2011/12–2017/18: Wellington (squad no. 54)
- 2015: Somerset
- 2016: Warwickshire
- 2017: Leicestershire
- 2017–2018: Guyana Amazon Warriors
- 2017: Chittagong Vikings
- 2018–2020: Islamabad United (squad no. 54)
- 2018: Kabul Zwanan

Career statistics
Competition	Test	ODI	FC	LA
Matches	4	85	100	190
Runs scored	319	1,397	5,614	4,194
Batting average	39.87	23.67	39.25	27.77
100s/50s	0/2	1/4	16/23	7/21
Top score	88	170*	148	170*
Catches/stumpings	5/0	105/12	343/17	249/32
Medal record
Men's Cricket
Representing New Zealand
ICC Cricket World Cup
Runner-up	2015 Australia and New Zealand
- Source: ESPNcricinfo, 9 May 2019

Luke Ronchi (/ˈrɒŋki/ RONG-ki; born 23 April 1981) is a New Zealand-Australian cricket coach and a former cricketer. He represented both the Australia national cricket team and New Zealand national cricket team in international cricket, the only player to have done so in cricketing history. He was also a part of the New Zealand squad to finish as runners-up at the 2015 Cricket World Cup. He played for Wellington in New Zealand domestic matches and has played Twenty20 matches for a range of teams. He retired from international cricket in June 2017.

Born in Dannevirke in the Manawatū-Whanganui region of New Zealand, Ronchi emigrated to Perth, Western Australia, with his family at an early age. He was educated at Kent Street Senior High School. He is an aggressive batsman and fields as a wicket-keeper. He debuted for Western Australia in January 2002. After a period as second-choice wicket-keeper behind Ryan Campbell, Ronchi became Western Australia's first-choice keeper after Campbell's retirement in 2006. For a period of time between 2007 and 2009, he served as Australia's second-choice keeper behind Brad Haddin, and played several matches for Australia A.

After Haddin broke his finger during the national team's 2008 tour of the West Indies, Ronchi played one Twenty20 International (T20I) and four One-Day International (ODI) matches, and later played two further Twenty20 International matches against the touring South African team in 2009. In February 2012, Ronchi announced his intention to return to New Zealand to further his cricketing career, and signed with the Wellington cricket team the following month. He made his ODI debut for New Zealand in May 2013, becoming the first player to play for both Australia and New Zealand at international level.

Ronchi made his Test debut for New Zealand in May 2015 against England scoring 88 off 70 balls. Ronchi's first innings runs were critical in propping up New Zealand after a shaky start on an overcast morning in Leeds. New Zealand won the match in only their fifth win in England and their first in nearly 30 years on English soil.

Ronchi announced his retirement from international cricket on 21 June 2017. Former New Zealand captain Brendon McCullum, under whom Ronchi spent most of his career playing, described Ronchi as someone who, "embodied all that is important about the Black Caps culture. Selfless, respectful, humble and hard working."

== Domestic career ==
Ronchi is well known for his ability to score runs quickly and on 7 February 2007 he broke the record for the fastest domestic one-day hundred in Australian cricket. Opening the batting against New South Wales, Ronchi scored his maiden one-day ton off only 56 deliveries, beating the previous record held by fellow West Australian Adam Voges of 62 deliveries. When dismissed, he had scored 105 runs from just 64 balls and easily guided Western Australia to an 8-wicket victory over New South Wales.

Ronchi began the 2007–08 season in strong fashion. Proving that he is in the Australian selectors minds for the future, Ronchi was chosen as Australia A wicketkeeper for their tour of Pakistan. In the second first-class match of the tour, Ronchi scored a blistering 107 off 109 balls, striking 16 fours and 2 sixes. His good form continued into the Australian Domestic season, as he scored 104 against New South Wales in Western Australia's first List A match of the season.

In November 2007 Ronchi scored one of the fastest centuries in Australian Domestic history with a ton from 51 balls against Queensland. Ronchi struck 11 sixes in his innings of 105* with his second fifty coming from just 11 balls.

Ronchi was also recruited by the Mumbai Indians team in 2007, one of the eight Indian Premier League (IPL) franchises. He played five matches for the team, spread throughout the 2008 and 2009 tournaments, scoring a total of 34 runs at an average of 6.80.

== International career ==
=== Australia ===
In April 2008, Cricket Australia named Brad Haddin as the only wicketkeeper in its list of 25 contracted players, overlooking Ronchi. Despite failing to receive a contract, Ronchi was called up to the Australian team in June 2008 during their tour of the West Indies when Haddin was unable to play after breaking his finger. After making his international debut in the tour's Twenty20 match (scoring 36 from 22 balls opening the batting with fellow West Australian on international debut, Shaun Marsh), he was not required to bat in his first two ODI matches.

In the final game of the series, he was elevated up the batting order to number three and batted very well to record the equal second fastest fifty by an Australian on his way to scoring 64 from 28 balls, including six sixes and was awarded the player of the match award (later in the same match David Hussey scored an even faster fifty relegating Ronchi's innings to equal third fastest).

Ronchi made his debut on home soil in a Twenty20 match at the Melbourne Cricket Ground (MCG) against the South Africans as wicketkeeper when Haddin was rested from the team.

=== New Zealand ===
In February 2012, Ronchi announced his intention to return to New Zealand in an attempt to qualify for the national team. He signed with Wellington in March 2012, and made his Plunket Shield debut on 18 March against Central Districts, scoring a 111 on debut for the team.

In April 2013, Ronchi was selected by the New Zealand cricket board as part of the limited-overs squad for the New Zealand tour of England the following month. He made his debut for the team on 31 May 2013 at Lord's, scoring a duck and taking three catches. He thus became the first player to play international cricket for both Australia and New Zealand, 8th player in ODI history and the first since Kepler Wessels (Australia and South Africa) in the 1980s to play for two full members of the International Cricket Council (ICC).

In January 2015, Ronchi hit an unbeaten 170 off 99 balls against Sri Lanka at University Oval in Dunedin. This was the highest by a batsman batting seventh or lower in ODIs, and also the third-highest score by a wicket-keeper, behind MS Dhoni's 183 not out and Adam Gilchrist's 172. Ronchi is also the only batsman to have scored a 150 in an ODI innings when batting at number 7 position or lower.

Ronchi along with Grant Elliott set the highest ever record stand of 267 not out for the sixth wicket in ODI history.

During the 2017 ICC Champions Trophy, in what was to be his final international matches, Ronchi played as an opening wicket-keeper-batsman. On 22 June, he announced his retirement from international cricket, although he would still be available in domestic cricket for Wellington and Leicestershire.

== Post international retirement ==
Following his international retirement, Ronchi signed for Leicestershire County Cricket Club to play in the 2017 NatWest t20 Blast. He enjoyed a successful tournament racking up 429 runs at a strike rate of 180.25 as an opener and scored three half-centuries, including a 16-ball 50 against Durham, the third fastest half-century in English T20 history. In the 2018 Pakistan Super League, Ronchi scored a half-century off 19 balls for Islamabad United, the second fastest in the history of the Pakistan Super League.

In June 2018, he was drafted by Edmonton Royals to play in the inaugural edition of the Global T20 Canada tournament and in September 2018 was named in Kabul's squad in the first edition of the Afghanistan Premier League tournament. In October he was drafted by Chittagong Vikings for the 2018–19 Bangladesh Premier League.

In July 2019, he was selected to play for the Rotterdam Rhinos in the inaugural edition of the Euro T20 Slam cricket tournament. However, the following month the tournament was cancelled.

== Coaching career ==
In April 2019, he was also appointed as fielding and wicketkeeping coach for New Zealand for the 2019 Cricket World Cup. Ronchi remained with New Zealand until 2026, when he left his position to take up the position as senior coach of the Melbourne Renegades in the Big Bash League.

== See also ==
- List of cricketers who have played for two international teams
