= Mohammad Sami =

Pakistani former cricketer

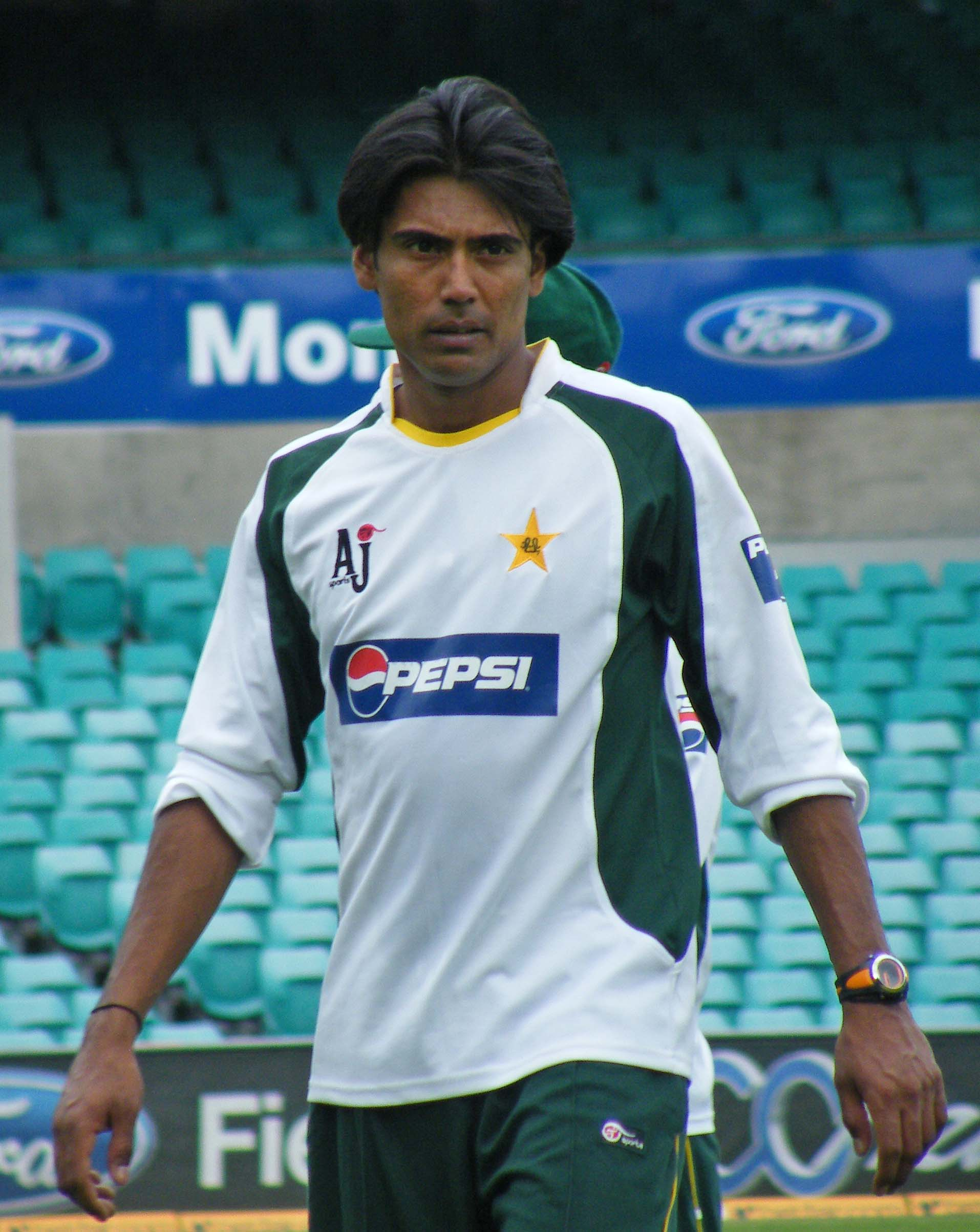
- Mohammad Sami in training kit in Australia

Personal information
- Born: 24 February 1981 (age 45); Karachi, Sindh, Pakistan
- Nickname: Bullet
- Height: 5 ft 9 in (175 cm)
- Batting: Right-handed
- Bowling: Right-arm fast
- Role: Bowler

International information
- National side: Pakistan (2001–2016)
- Test debut (cap 167): 8 March 2001 v New Zealand
- Last Test: 8 July 2012 v Sri Lanka
- ODI debut (cap 137): 8 April 2001 v Sri Lanka
- Last ODI: 29 May 2015 v Zimbabwe
- ODI shirt no.: 7
- T20I debut (cap 37): 1 May 2010 v Bangladesh
- Last T20I: 25 March 2016 v Australia

Domestic team information
- Years: Team
- 1999/2000: Pakistan Customs
- 2000/01–2018/19: Karachi
- 2001/02–2006/07: National Bank of Pakistan
- 2003–2004: Kent
- 2006/07–2011/12: Sindh
- 2008: Sussex
- 2012/13–2015/16: Port Qasim Authority
- 2012: Duronto Rajshahi
- 2015: Barisal Bulls
- 2016–2019: Islamabad United
- 2017: Jamaica Tallawahs
- 2018: St Lucia Stars

Career statistics
Competition	Test	ODI	FC	LA
Matches	36	87	179	191
Runs scored	487	314	3,479	1,093
Batting average	11.59	11.62	17.13	13.16
100s/50s	0/0	0/0	0/6	0/1
Top score	49	46	77	55*
Balls bowled	7,499	4,284	30,627	9,266
Wickets	85	121	610	257
Bowling average	52.74	27.48	27.35	30.47
5 wickets in innings	2	1	32	4
10 wickets in match	0	0	4	0
Best bowling	5/36	5/10	8/39	6/20
Catches/stumpings	7/–	19/–	103/–	41/–
- Source: ESPNcricinfo, 4 June 2020

Mohammad Sami (Urdu: محمد سمیع; born 24 February 1981) is a Pakistani cricket coach and former cricketer who played for the Pakistan national cricket team between 2001 and 2016.

== Domestic career ==
Sami joined the Indian Cricket League following the tour of India in December 2007. He played for the Lahore Badshahs, a team composed entirely of Pakistani cricketers, during the Indian Cricket League's second Twenty20 tournament. His participation in the league meant that he, like many other Pakistan players, was banned from representing his country at both international level and domestic cricket in Pakistan.

Sami was bought by Islamabad United for US$50,000 in the Pakistan Super League. He finished the season as the 2nd highest wicket-taker for his team and 4th overall in the tournament with 12 wickets in 7 matches. He was retained by Islamabad United in 2017 season again finishing the season as 2nd highest wicket-taker for his team. He is the second leading wicket-taker with 24 wickets in 16 matches.

In 2013, Sami was retained by the BPL team, Duronto Rajshahi to play as the main fast bowler, but cause of disagreements between PCB and BCB no Pakistani player (including Sami) was allowed to play in the BPL. This was a big loss for Duronto, because Sami was the highest wicket-taker last season.

He was signed by Jamaica Tallawahs for the 2017 Caribbean Premier League. He was then picked by St Lucia Stars for the 2018 Caribbean Premier League.

He was the leading wicket-taker for Karachi Whites in the 2017–18 Quaid-e-Azam Trophy, with 28 dismissals in five matches.

In April 2018, he was named in Punjab's squad for the 2018 Pakistan Cup. In October 2018, he was named in the squad for the Rajshahi Kings team, following the draft for the 2018–19 Bangladesh Premier League. In March 2019, he was named in Punjab's squad for the 2019 Pakistan Cup.

== International career ==
=== Golden years ===
Sami, initially named as the modern Malcolm Marshall by Imran Khan, made his Test cricket debut against New Zealand in 2001 by taking 8 wickets for 106 runs in the match, including five wickets in the second innings. During his third Test match he achieved a hat-trick against Sri Lanka and in 2002 he took his second hat-trick in his career, against the West Indies during a One Day International match. This led to him becoming one of only a two bowlers in cricket (the other was Wasim Akram) to achieve this mark in both forms of the game. He also displayed excellent performances against Zimbabwe and New Zealand in 2003. On 1 December 2003, he achieved his best bowling figures in One Day International cricket by taking 5 wickets for 10 runs during a match. Earlier in April during that year in Sharjah in the United Arab Emirates, he had taken 4 wickets for 25 runs against Kenya during the match. Sami played his 50th One Day International match against India at Lahore in Pakistan on 24 March 2004.

He has also taken over 100 wickets in First-class cricket and in List A cricket.

=== Loss of form ===
Sami also earned the ignominy of bowling the longest over in One Day International cricket during the Asia Cup match against Bangladesh in 2004, when he bowled 17 balls in one over which consisted of seven wides and four no-balls. He is also the only bowler in Test cricket history to have over 50 wickets and a bowling average of 50.

After losing form and failing to achieve success for the Pakistan cricket team, the Pakistan Cricket Board and its national selectors replaced Sami for the One Day International series against England with fellow fast bowler Mohammad Asif. However he was recalled for the series against South Africa in 2007. He was selected in the 15-man Pakistan squad for the 2007 Cricket World Cup, although he was named as one of five reserves. After teammates Shoaib Akhtar and Mohammad Asif were dropped from the World Cup squad, since neither of the two had been declared fit and they had not undergone official doping tests, Sami and Yasir Arafat were called up as replacements.

=== Comeback ===
In 2009–2010, he was recalled to the Pakistan team and on 3 January 2010, during Pakistan's Test match series against Australia, he played at the Sydney Cricket Ground in Australia and took 3 wickets for 27 runs in the first innings of the second Test match. On 19 April he was selected in the Pakistan squad as one of the replacements for the injured fast bowlers Umar Gul and Yasir Arafat, in the 2010 ICC World Twenty20 tournament held in the West Indies.

Sami was recalled and played against South Africa in the middle east in November 2010. In May 2012 Sami received another recall and was announced in the squad that toured Sri Lanka in June 2012, because of his amazing performances in the Bangladesh premier league (which included a hat trick and a 5-wicket haul). He bowled brilliantly in the 2nd T20I.

Following that, in the 1st ODI he bowled economically and with pace, which earned him a place in the 15-man squad to play the touring Australians and also the 2012 ICC World Twenty20. Sami was selected for these international tours, but didn't get to play an official game (he got to play two warm up matches), as Pakistan made it to the semi-finals, but lost to Sri-lanka.

In May 2015, Sami was selected for the T20I side that is going to play Zimbabwe in Lahore. This happened after impressive performances in the Faysal Bank T20I cup. Sami made comeback in the home series against Zimbabwe. In his comeback match, Mohammad Sami took three wickets for Pakistan. Sami has been included in Pakistan squad for the 2016 ICC World Twenty20 as a result of strong performances in the BPL, the PSL and the Asia Cup where he bowled accurately at more than 140 km/h on a consistent basis.

== Bowling action ==
Sami has a quick arm action and he is regarded as one of the fastest bowlers in world cricket and has the ability to swing the cricket ball at high pace. He has unofficially bowled the fastest delivery in cricket when he clocked at 164 km/h (101.9 mph) during a One Day International match. However, it was revoked by cricket officials after it found faulty speed measurements on the speed meter. However, despite his speed, he has been in and out of the national side for several times. However he has received support from 2 former Pakistan captains Wasim Akram and Waqar Younis, who both saw Sami's speed and wicket taking ability as an important skill for the Pakistan team.

== Coaching career ==
In September 2022, he was appointed bowling coach to the Mardan Warriors squad for the inaugural season of the Pakistan Junior League.

== Cricket administration ==
In February 2023, he became a member of Haroon Rasheed's national selection committee.

== See also ==
- List of Pakistan cricketers who have taken five-wicket hauls on Test debut
