= 2019 Karachi Kings season =

Overview of Karachi kings in 2019

Karachi Kings
2019 season
- Coach: Mickey Arthur
- Captain: Imad Wasim
- PSL 2019: Playoffs (4th)

The Karachi Kings is a franchise cricket team that competed in the 2019 Season. The team is based in Karachi, Sindh, Pakistan in the Pakistan Super League (PSL). The team was coached by Mickey Arthur, and captained by Imad Wasim.

== Teams standings ==
=== Points table ===
Pos	Team	Pld	W	L	T	NR	Pts	NRR
1	Peshawar Zalmi (R)	10	7	3	0	0	14	0.828
2	Quetta Gladiators (C)	10	7	3	0	0	14	0.376
3	Islamabad United (3rd)	10	5	5	0	0	10	0.127
4	Karachi Kings (4th)	10	5	5	0	0	10	−0.673
5	Multan Sultans	10	3	7	0	0	6	0.173
6	Lahore Qalandars	10	3	7	0	0	6	−0.837

Source: ESPNcricinfo
- The top 4 teams qualified for the playoffs
- Advanced to Qualifier
- Advanced to Eliminator 1

Notes:

- C = Champions;
- R = Runner-up;
- (x) = Position at the end of the tournament;

== Kit manufacturers and sponsors ==
Kit manufacturer	Shirt sponsor (chest)	Shirt sponsor (back)	Chest branding	Sleeve branding
AJ Sports	TUC	Scene on!	Cadbury Dairy Milk	Imtiaz Super Market, Inverex, Rooh Afza

Playing kit
