= 2019 Peshawar Zalmi season =

Peshawar Zalmi
2019 season
- Coach: Mohammad Akram
- Captain: Daren Sammy
- PSL 2019: Runners-up
- Most runs: Kamran Akmal (357)
- Most wickets: Hasan Ali (25)

The Peshawar Zalmi is a franchise cricket team that represents Peshawar in the Pakistan Super League. They were one of the six teams that participated in the 2019 season.

The team was captained by Daren Sammy, and coached by Mohammad Akram. They ended as the runners-up for the second consecutive season after losing in the final against Quetta Gladiators. They finished first in their group after winning seven out of their ten group stage matches.

Kamran Akmal was the team's best batsman with 357 runs from 13 matches. Hasan Ali was the team's best bowler with 25 wickets across 13 matches. He was also the leading wicket-taker of the tournament and hence, won the Maroon Cap and Fazal Mehmood award for best bowler of the season.

== Squad ==
- Players with international caps are shown in **bold**
- Ages are given as of the first match of the season, 14 February 2019

No.	Name	Nationality	Birth date	Batting style	Bowling style	Year signed	Notes
Batsmen
22	**Misbah-ul-Haq**	Pakistan	28 May 1974 (aged 44)	Right-handed	Right-arm leg break	2018	Captain
26	**Imam-ul-Haq**	Pakistan	12 December 1995 (aged 23)	Left-handed	—	2019	
92	**Sohaib Maqsood**	Pakistan	15 April 1987 (aged 31)	Right-handed	Right-arm off break	2018	
	**Lendl Simmons**	West Indies	25 January 1985 (aged 34)	Right-handed	Right-arm medium fast	2019	Overseas
	Nabi Gul	Pakistan	5 October 1997 (aged 21)	Right-handed	—	2019	
	Samiullah	Pakistan	11 November 1996 (aged 22)	Right-handed	—	2019	
	**Dawid Malan**	England	3 September 1987 (aged 31)	Left-handed		2019	Overseas
All-rounders
4	Khalid Usman	Pakistan	1 March 1986 (aged 32)	Right-handed	Slow left-arm orthodox	2018	
7	**Liam Dawson**	England	1 March 1990 (aged 28)	Right-handed	Slow left-arm orthodox	2018	Overseas
55	**Kieron Pollard**	West Indies	12 May 1987 (aged 31)	Right-handed	Right-arm medium-fast	2018	Overseas
88	**Darren Sammy**	West Indies	20 December 1983 (aged 35)	Right-handed	Right-arm medium-fast	2019	Overseas; Captain
200	**Umar Amin**	Pakistan	16 October 1989 (aged 29)	Left-handed	Right-arm medium	2019	
	**Wayne Madsen**	England	2 January 1985 (aged 34)	Right-handed	Right-arm off-break	2019	Overseas
Wicket-keepers
23	**Kamran Akmal**	Pakistan	13 January 1982 (aged 37)	Right-handed	—	2018	
72	**Andre Fletcher**	West Indies	28 November 1987 (aged 31)	Right-handed	—	2019	Overseas
	Jamal Anwar	Pakistan	31 December 1990 (aged 28)	Right-handed	—	2019	
Bowlers
7	**Tymal Mills**	England	12 August 1992 (aged 26)	Right-handed	Left-arm fast	2019	Overseas
9	Ibtisam Sheikh	Pakistan	16 March 1999 (aged 19)	Right-handed	Left-arm leg break googly	2019	
13	Umaid Asif	Pakistan	30 April 1984 (aged 34)	Right-handed	Right-arm medium fast	2018	
14	Sameen Gul	Pakistan	4 February 1999 (aged 20)	Right-handed	Right-arm medium	2018	
32	**Hasan Ali**	Pakistan	7 February 1994 (aged 25)	Right-handed	Right-arm medium fast	2018	
34	**Chris Jordan**	England	4 October 1988 (aged 30)	Right-handed	Right-arm fast	2019	Overseas
47	**Wahab Riaz**	Pakistan	28 June 1985 (aged 33)	Right-handed	Left-arm fast	2016	
	Waqar Salamkheil	Afghanistan	2 October 2001 (aged 17)	Right-handed	Left-arm medium	2019	Overseas. Unavailable, replaced by Andre Fletcher.

== Kit manufacturers and sponsors ==
Kit manufacturer	Shirt sponsor (chest)	Shirt sponsor (back)	Chest branding	Sleeve branding
Zalmi in-house	Haier	Zalmi TV	RD	McDonald's Pakistan, Sprite, TCL

Playing kit

== Season standings ==
=== Points table ===
Pos	Team	Pld	W	L	T	NR	Pts	NRR
1	Peshawar Zalmi (R)	10	7	3	0	0	14	0.828
2	Quetta Gladiators (C)	10	7	3	0	0	14	0.376
3	Islamabad United (3rd)	10	5	5	0	0	10	0.127
4	Karachi Kings (4th)	10	5	5	0	0	10	−0.673
5	Multan Sultans	10	3	7	0	0	6	0.173
6	Lahore Qalandars	10	3	7	0	0	6	−0.837

Source: ESPNcricinfo
- The top 4 teams qualified for the playoffs
- Advanced to Qualifier
- Advanced to Eliminator 1

Notes:

- C = Champions;
- R = Runner-up;
- (x) = Position at the end of the tournament;

== Season summary ==
Peshawar Zalmi finished the group stage with first position by winning seven of their matches and losing three. Peshawar came on top because of the higher run rate. Zalmi lost to Quetta Gladiators in the qualifier by 10 runs. Zalmi then defeated Islamabad United by 48 runs in the eliminator to reach the PSL final.

In the final in Karachi, after Peshawar Zalmi's openers got out, Sohaib Maqsood, who scored run-a-ball 20, added 31 runs for the third wicket with Umar Amin (38 runs off 33 balls). Zalmi scored 138–8 in 20 overs batting first. Peshawar Zalmi lost to Gladiators, who achieved the target in 17.5 overs, by 8 wickets finishing runners-up in the league.
