= 2019 Pakistan Super League final =

Tournament final

2019 Pakistan Super League Final
Peshawar Zalmi	Quetta Gladiators
Peshawar Zalmi team colors	Quetta Gladiators team colors
138/8	139/2
20 overs	17.5 overs
- Quetta Gladiators won by 8 wickets
- Date: 17 March 2019
- Venue: National Stadium, Karachi
- Player of the match: Mohammad Hasnain (Quetta Gladiators)
- Umpires: Ranmore Martinesz; Ahsan Raza
- Attendance: 34,228

The 2019 Pakistan Super League Final was a Twenty20 cricket match, played on 17 March 2019 at the National Stadium in Karachi, Pakistan to determine the winner of the 2019 Pakistan Super League. Quetta Gladiators won the final against Peshawar Zalmi by 8 wickets to win their first title. Mohammad Hasnain was awarded man of the match award.

Some 20 percent of the tickets for the final were sold online on 20 February 2019. While the rest of the tickets were sold starting from 25 February 2019 at TCS Courier centers.

== Route to the Final ==
During the group stage of the 2019 Pakistan Super League each team played ten matches, two against each of the other sides contesting the competition. 26 matches were played in the United Arab Emirates while 7 matches were played in Karachi. The top four teams progressed to the playoff stage. Peshawar Zalmi and Quetta Gladiator finished the group stage in the first and second position respectively by winning seven of their matches and losing three. Peshawar topped the points table because of their higher run rate.

=== League stage matches ===
15 February 2019 (D/N)

Peshawar Zalmi; 155/4 (20 overs)	v	Quetta Gladiators; 161/4 (19.4 overs)

Quetta won by 6 wickets
Dubai International Cricket Stadium, Dubai

4 March 2019 (D/N)

Peshawar Zalmi; 165/4 (20 overs)	v	Quetta Gladiators; 166/2 (17.4 overs)

Quetta won by 8 wickets
Sheikh Zayed Cricket Stadium, Abu Dhabi

=== Playoff matches ===
==== Qualifier ====
13 March 2019 (D/N)

Quetta Gladiators; 186/6 (20 overs)	v	Peshawar Zalmi; 176/7 (20 overs)

Quetta won by 10 runs
National Stadium, Karachi

==== Eliminators ====
===== Eliminator 1 =====
14 March 2019 (D/N)

Karachi Kings; 161/9 (20 overs)	v	Islamabad United; 164/6 (19.3 overs)

Islamabad won by 4 wickets
National Stadium, Karachi

===== Eliminator 2 =====
15 March 2019 (D/N)

Peshawar Zalmi; 214/5 (20 overs)	v	Islamabad United; 166/9 (20 overs)

Peshawar won by 48 runs
National Stadium, Karachi

== Match ==
The final match was played between Quetta Gladiators and Peshawar Zalmi in a packed 32,000 capacity National Stadium, Karachi, Pakistan.

=== Report ===
Quetta Gladiators won the toss and elected to field. In the first innings, Peshawar Zalmi's openers Imam-ul-Haq and Kamran Akmal were out early-on, for 3 runs off 4 balls at 1.3 overs and for 21 runs off 15 balls at the end of the fourth over, respectively. Following which Sohaib Maqsood, added 31 runs for the third wicket with Umar Amin before getting caught at long off scoring run-a-ball 20. Amin, the top scorer for his side, was caught out at deep mid-wicket after making 38 runs off 33 balls. Nabi Gul was caught out at 14.4 overs for 9 runs off 12 balls. Kieron Pollard was caught behind for seven off 12 balls. Later, Darren Sammy and Wahab Riaz added 28 runs for the seventh wicket. Zalmi scored 138-8 in 20 overs batting first with Quetta Gladiators' pacer Mohammad Hasnain finishing his four overs with the figures of 3-30 and Dwayne Bravo finishing with 2-24.

In the second innings, Quetta Gladiators' Ahmed Shehzad, who scored 58 runs not out off 51-balls and Ahsan Ali, who scored a 18-ball 25 added 47 for the second wicket after opener Shane Watson was run out for seven runs in the third over. Shehzad's unbroken partnership of 73 runs for the third wicket with Rilee Rossouw who made 39 not out off 32 balls, helped Gladiators achieve the target in 17.5 overs. Rossouw took the winning single. Thus, Gladiators won their maiden PSL title by beating Zalmi by eight wickets. Hasnain was named the man-of-the-match.

== Scorecard ==
keys:

- † indicates team captain
- * indicates not out

Toss: Quetta Gladiators won the toss and elected to field.

Peshawar Zalmi innings
Player	Status	Runs	Balls	4s	6s	Strike rate
Kamran Akmal	b Mohammad Nawaz	21	15	3	1	140.00
Imam-ul-Haq	c Shehzad b Mohammad Hasnain	3	4	0	0	75.00
Sohaib Maqsood	c Rossouw b DJ Bravo	20	20	3	0	100.00
Umar Amin	c Tanvir b Mohammad Hasnain	38	33	3	2	115.15
Nabi Gul	c Shehzad b Fawad	9	12	0	0	75.00
Kieron Pollard	c †Sarfraz b Mohammad Husnain	7	12	1	0	58.33
†Darren Sammy	c Mohammad Nawaz b DJ Bravo	18	16	2	0	112.50
Wahab Riaz	runout (Nawaz)	12	8	1	0	150.00
Chris Jordan	*	0	0			-
Hasan Ali						
Tymal Mills						
Extras (lb 8, w 2); Total 138/8 (20 overs)				13	3	6.9 RR

Fall of wickets: 4/1 (Imam-ul-Haq, 1.3 ov), 31/2 (Kamran Akmal, 3.6 ov), 62/3 (Sohaib Maqsood, 9.3 ov), 90/4 (Umar Amin, 13.1 ov), 96/5 (Nabi Gul, 14.4 ov), 110/6 (KA Pollard, 16.6 ov), 138/7 (Wahab Riaz, 19.5 ov), 138/8 (Daren Sammy, 20 ov)

Quetta Gladiators bowling
Bowler	Overs	Maidens	Runs	Wickets	Econ	Wides	NBs
Sohail Tanvir	4	0	23	0	5.75	2	0
Mohammad Hasnain	4	0	30	3	7.50	0	0
Mohammad Nawaz	4	0	31	1	7.75	0	0
DJ Bravo	4	0	24	2	6.00	0	0
Fawad Ahmed	4	0	22	1	5.50	0	0

Target: 139 runs from 20 overs at 6.95 RR

Quetta Gladiators innings
Player	Status	Runs	Balls	4s	6s	Strike rate
Shane Watson	run out (Umar Amin)	7	6	1	0	116.66
Ahmed Shehzad	*	58	51	6	1	113.72
Ahsan Ali	c Sammy b Wahab	25	18	3	1	138.88
Rilee Rossouw	*	39	32	5		121.87
Umar Akmal						
†Sarfraz Ahmed						
Dwayne Bravo						
Mohammad Nawaz						
Sohail Tanvir						
Mohammad Hasnain						
Fawad Ahmed						
Extras (lb 5, w 5); Total 139/2 (17.5 overs)				15	2	7.79 RR

Fall of wickets: 19/1 (Watson, 2.4 ov), 64/2 (Ahsan Ali, 7.4 ov)

Peshawar Zalmi bowling
Bowler	Overs	Maidens	Runs	Wickets	Econ	Wides	NBs
Hasan Ali	4	0	29	0	7.25	0	0
Tymal Mills	4	0	31	0	7.75	1	0
Chris Jordan	3	0	38	0	12.66	1	0
Wahab Riaz	4	0	19	1	4.75	2	0
Sohaib Maqsood	1	0	8	0	8.00	0	0
Kieron Pollard	1	0	5	0	5.00	0	0
Nabi Gul	0.5	0	4	0	4.80	0	0

Result: Quetta Gladiator won by 8 wickets.

== Match Officials ==
Role	Name
On field Umpire	(Sri Lanka) Ranmore Martinesz
On field Umpire	(Pakistan) Ahsan Raza
TV Umpire	(Pakistan) Shozab Raza
Reserve Umpire	(Pakistan) Rashid Riaz
Match Referee	(Sri Lanka) Roshan Mahanama
