= 2019 Quetta Gladiators season =

Overview of Quetta Gladiators in 2019

Quetta Gladiators
2019 season
- Coach: Moin Khan
- Captain: Sarfraz Ahmed
- PSL 2019: Champions
- Most runs: Shane Watson (430)
- Most wickets: Sohail Tanvir (15)

The Quetta Gladiators are a franchise cricket team that represents Quetta in the Pakistan Super League. They were one of the six teams that competed in the 2019 season.

The team was captained by Pakistani Skipper Sarfraz Ahmed, coached by Moin Khan and mentored by Viv Richards, while Abdul Razzaq served as Assistant Coach. They became the Champions for the first time, after being the Runners-up twice in the 2016 and 2017 seasons. They became champions after defeating their arch-rivals Peshawar Zalmi in the final on 17 March at National Stadium. They finished second after the completion of their group stage matches, winning seven matches from their ten matches. They defeated Peshawar Zalmi in the Qualifier to reach the finals.

Australian player Shane Watson was the team's and season's best batsman with 430 runs from 12 matches. He won the Green Cap and Hanif Mohammad award for best batsman of the season, while Sohail Tanvir with 15 wickets from 12 matches was the leading wicket taker for the team and finished in the top five bowlers of the season.

== Squad ==
- Players with international caps are listed in **bold**.
- Ages are given as of the first match of the season, 14 February 2019

No.	Name	Nationality	Birth date	Batting style	Bowlling style	Year signed	Notes
Batsmen
04	**Rilee Rossouw**	South Africa	9 October 1989 (aged 29)	Left-handed	Right-arm off break	2019	Overseas
05	Saud Shakeel	Pakistan	5 September 1995 (aged 23)	Left-handed	Left-arm orthodox	2019	
19	**Ahmed Shehzad**	Pakistan	23 November 1991 (aged 27)	Right-handed	Right-arm leg break	2018	
23	Ahsan Ali	Pakistan	10 December 1993 (aged 25)	Right-handed	Right-arm leg break	2019	
All-rounders
21	**Mohammad Nawaz**	Pakistan	21 March 1994 (aged 24)	Right-handed	Slow left-arm orthodox	2018	
033	**Sohail Tanvir**	Pakistan	12 December 1984 (aged 34)	Left-handed	Left-arm medium fast	2018	
33	**Shane Watson**	Australia	17 June 1981 (aged 37)	Right-handed	Right-arm fast medium	2018	Overseas
47	**Dwayne Bravo**	West Indies	7 October 1983 (aged 35)	Right-handed	Right-arm medium fast	2019	Overseas
48	**Anwar Ali**	Pakistan	25 November 1987 (aged 31)	Right-handed	Right-arm fast-medium	2018	
814	**Dwayne Smith**	West Indies	12 April 1983 (aged 35)	Right-handed	Right-arm medium	2019	Overseas
18	Danish Aziz	Pakistan	20 November 1995 (aged 23)	Left-handed	Slow left-arm orthodox	2019	
74	**Sunil Narine**	West Indies	26 May 1988 (aged 30)	Left-handed	Right-arm off-spin	2019	Overseas
	Jalat Khan	Pakistan	3 February 1986 (aged 33)	Left-handed	Slow left-arm orthodox	2019	
Wicket-keepers
45	Azam Khan	Pakistan	10 August 1998 (aged 20)	Left-handed	—	2019	
54	**Sarfaraz Ahmed**	Pakistan	22 May 1987 (aged 31)	Right-handed	—	2019	Captain
96	**Umar Akmal**	Pakistan	26 May 1990 (aged 28)	Right-handed	Right-arm off spin	2019	
Bowlers
010	Max Waller	England	3 March 1988 (aged 30)	Right-handed	Right-arm leg break	2019	Overseas
10	Ghulam Mudassar	Pakistan	24 September 1999 (aged 19)	Right-handed	Right-arm off break	2019	
11	**Harry Gurney**	England	25 October 1986 (aged 32)	Right-handed	Left-arm medium fast	2019	Overseas
17	Mohammad Asghar	Pakistan	28 December 1998 (aged 20)	Left-handed	Slow left-arm orthodox	2019	
22	Mohammad Irfan	Pakistan	15 May 1995 (aged 23)	Right-handed	Right-arm fast	2019	
20	Mohammad Hasnain	Pakistan	5 April 2000 (aged 18)	Right-handed	Right-arm fast	2019	
52	**Fawad Ahmed**	Australia	5 February 1982 (aged 37)	Right-handed	Right-arm leg-break	2019	Overseas
16	Naseem Shah	Pakistan	15 February 2003 (aged 15)	Right-handed	Right-arm fast	2019	Injured, replaced by Mohammad Hasnain.

== Kit manufacturers and sponsors ==
Shirt sponsor (chest)	Shirt sponsor (back)	Chest branding	Sleeve branding
Engro	Olpers	Master Oil	Engro Foods

UAE kit

Pakistan kit

== Season standings ==
=== Points table ===
Pos	Team	Pld	W	L	T	NR	Pts	NRR
1	Peshawar Zalmi (R)	10	7	3	0	0	14	0.828
2	Quetta Gladiators (C)	10	7	3	0	0	14	0.376
3	Islamabad United (3rd)	10	5	5	0	0	10	0.127
4	Karachi Kings (4th)	10	5	5	0	0	10	−0.673
5	Multan Sultans	10	3	7	0	0	6	0.173
6	Lahore Qalandars	10	3	7	0	0	6	−0.837

Source: ESPNcricinfo
- The top 4 teams qualified for the playoffs
- Advanced to Qualifier
- Advanced to Eliminator 1

Notes:

- C = Champions;
- R = Runner-up;
- (x) = Position at the end of the tournament;

== Season summary ==
Gladiators finished the group stage with second position by winning seven of their matches and losing three. They then defeated Peshawar Zalmi in the qualifier by 10 runs to reach the final.

In the final in Karachi, Gladiators won the toss and elected to field. Gladiators restricted Zalmi to 138–8 in 20 overs with pacer Mohammad Hasnain finishing his four overs with the figures of 3-30 and Dwayne Bravo finishing with 2-24. In the second innings, Ahmed Shehzad scored unbeaten 58 runs off 51-balls. Rilee Rossouw, who made 39 not out off 32 balls, took the winning single. Gladiators achieved the target in 17.5 overs defeating Peshawar Zalmi by 8 wickets to win their first title. Gladiators' Hasnain was awarded man of the match award.
