= 2019 Islamabad United season =

Pakistani franchisee cricket team

Islamabad United
2019 season
- Coach: Dean Jones
- Captain: Mohammad Sami (9 matches); Shadab Khan (3 matches)
- PSL 2019: Eliminator 2
- Most runs: Cameron Delport (355)
- Most wickets: Faheem Ashraf (21)

Islamabad United is a franchise cricket team that represents Islamabad, the capital city of Pakistan, in the Pakistan Super League. They were the defending champions in PSL 2019, having won the title in the 2018 season and becoming the most successful PSL team at that time. They were one of the six teams competing in the 2019 season. The team was captained by Pakistani quick bowler Mohammad Sami and by Shadab Khan in three matches after Sami was out injured. They finished 3rd, after winning six matches from their twelve matches in the PSL 2019. Cameron Delport and Faheem Ashraf were the team's leading runs-scorer and wickets-taker, respectively.

== Islamabad United ==
- Players with international caps are listed in **bold**.
- Ages are given as of the date of the first match of the 2019 season, 14 February 2019

No.	Name	Nationality	Birth date	Batting style	Bowling style	Year signed	Notes
Batsmen
8	**Sahibzada Farhan**	Pakistan	6 March 1996 (aged 22)	Right-handed	—	2019	
	Cameron Delport	South Africa	12 May 1989 (aged 29)	Left-handed	Right-arm medium	2019	
	Nasir Nawaz	Pakistan	5 October 1998 (aged 20)	Right-handed	Right-arm medium-fast	2019	
	**Ian Bell**	England	11 April 1982 (aged 36)	Right-handed	Right-arm medium	2019	Overseas
10	**Alex Hales**	England	3 January 1989 (aged 30)	Right-handed	Right-arm medium	2019	Overseas
13	**Asif Ali**	Pakistan	1 October 1991 (aged 27)	Right-handed	Right-arm medium-fast	2018	
22	Rizwan Hussain	Pakistan	26 April 1996 (aged 22)	Left-handed	—	2019	
All-rounders
5	Hussain Talat	Pakistan	12 February 1996 (aged 23)	Left-handed	Right-arm medium-fast	2017	
7	Amad Butt	Pakistan	10 May 1995 (aged 23)	Right-handed	Right-arm fast-medium	2016	
	**Wayne Parnell**	South Africa	30 July 1989 (aged 29)	Right-handed	Left-arm fast-medium	2019	Overseas
29	**Samit Patel**	England	30 November 1984 (aged 34)	Right-handed	Slow left-arm orthodox	2019	Overseas
41	**Fahim Ashraf**	Pakistan	16 January 1994 (aged 25)	Left-handed	Right-arm medium-fast	2018	
76	**Shadab Khan**	Pakistan	4 October 1998 (aged 20)	Right-handed	Right-arm leg break	2018	Vice-captain
Wicket-keepers
54	**Luke Ronchi**	New Zealand	23 April 1981 (aged 37)	Right-handed	—	2018	Overseas
59	**Chadwick Walton**	Jamaica	3 July 1985 (aged 33)	Right-handed	—	2018	Overseas
	Phil Salt	England	28 August 1996 (aged 22)	Right-handed	Right-arm medium-fast	2019	Overseas
Bowlers
7	**Mohammad Sami**	Pakistan	24 February 1981 (aged 37)	Right-handed	Right-arm fast	2018	Captain
11	**Rumman Raees**	Pakistan	18 October 1991 (aged 27)	Right-handed	Left-arm medium-fast	2018	
17	**Zafar Gohar**	Pakistan	1 February 1995 (aged 24)	Left-handed	Slow left-arm orthodox	2018	
	Musa Khan	Pakistan	28 August 2000 (aged 18)	Right-handed	Right-arm medium	2019	
	**Waqas Maqsood**	Pakistan	4 November 1987 (aged 31)	Right-handed	Left-arm medium	2019	
	**Zahir Khan**	Afghanistan	20 December 1998 (aged 20)	Left-handed	Left-arm unorthodox spin	2019	Overseas

== Kit manufacturers and sponsors ==
Shirt sponsor (chest)	Shirt sponsor (back)	Chest branding	Sleeve branding
Bisconni		Fast cables	Samaa, Tetra Pak, Sprite

Playing kit

== Season summary ==
In the opening match of the season, United defeated Lahore Qalandars after chasing down 171 runs in the 20th over, winning the match by 5 wickets. Then they went on to lose their next two games against Multan Sultans by 5 wickets and Quetta Gladiators by 7 wickets, respectively. In the next game against Peshawar Zalmi, being asked to bat first, the defending champions were 49–3 at one stage before Ian Bell and Cameron Delport put on 56 runs which helped the team post a competitive total of 158 runs for 9 in 20 overs. In the chase of 158 runs, Zalmi were reeling at 65 runs for 5 wickets at one stage. Kieron Pollard and Darren Sammy steadied the team with a 55-run partnership. Zalmi hopes of winnings were dashed after Pollard departed after scoring 51 runs. In the end, Islamabad managed to win by 12 runs after captain Mohammad Sami's hat-trick in the last over.

Pos	Team	Pld	W	L	T	NR	Pts	NRR
1	Peshawar Zalmi (R)	10	7	3	0	0	14	0.828
2	Quetta Gladiators (C)	10	7	3	0	0	14	0.376
3	Islamabad United (3rd)	10	5	5	0	0	10	0.127
4	Karachi Kings (4th)	10	5	5	0	0	10	−0.673
5	Multan Sultans	10	3	7	0	0	6	0.173
6	Lahore Qalandars	10	3	7	0	0	6	−0.837

Source: ESPNcricinfo
- The top 4 teams qualified for the playoffs
- Advanced to Qualifier
- Advanced to Eliminator 1

Notes:

- C = Champions;
- R = Runner-up;
- (x) = Position at the end of the tournament;
