= List of Pakistan Super League venues =

The Pakistan Super League (Urdu: پاکستان سپر لیگ) is a professional Twenty20 cricket league, founded by the Pakistan Cricket Board on 9 September 2015. The league comprises six teams, with matches being held in February and March.

In the first season, matches were played in stadiums across the United Arab Emirates. In the second season, the league's final was held in Lahore, Pakistan. The following season, the league's playoffs and final were held in the Pakistani cities of Karachi and Lahore. In 2019, the last eight matches of the fourth season were played in Pakistan.

The entire league was held in Pakistan for the first time in 2020, however it was struck by COVID-19 pandemic and had to be postponed.

== Venues ==
=== United Arab Emirates ===
- Dubai: The Dubai International Cricket Stadium was the first stadium to host PSL matches, holding a capacity of 25,000. The stadium has held 60 league matches and five ceremonies.
- Sharjah: The Sharjah Cricket Stadium, also known as the Sharjah Cricket Association Stadium, was the second stadium to host PSL matches. The stadium has held 40 PSL matches, but no ceremonies have been held in the stadium. Its capacity was increased in 2019, from 14,000 to 17,000, to better accommodate PSL matches.
- Abu Dhabi: The Sheikh Zayed Cricket Stadium is in Abu Dhabi, with a capacity of 20,000. The PSL has only held four matches in this stadium during the fourth season in 2019, but has not held any ceremonies.

Stadium	Dubai International Cricket Stadium	Sharjah Cricket Stadium	Sheikh Zayed Cricket Stadium
Images			
Map	List of Pakistan Super League venues is located in United Arab Emirates		

=== Pakistan ===
- Lahore: The Gaddafi Stadium was the first Pakistani stadium to host PSL matches, and it holds a capacity of 27,000. It has hosted 17 PSL matches. Both the 2017 final and the closing ceremony were held at this stadium.
- Karachi: The National Stadium holds a capacity of 34,000. It has hosted 17 PSL matches and three ceremonies.
- Rawalpindi: The Rawalpindi Cricket Stadium holds a capacity of 15,000. It has hosted three PSL matches, all coming in the 2020 season, but has not held any ceremonies.
- Peshawar: The Imran Khan Cricket Stadium holds a capacity of 35,000.It will host future PSL Matches in 2026.
- Faisalabad: The Iqbal Stadium has a capacity of 17,000. It will host PSL matches in 2026.
- Multan: The Multan Cricket Stadium holds a capacity of 30,000. It has hosted three PSL matches, but has not held any ceremonies.

Stadium	Gaddafi Stadium, Lahore	National Stadium, Karachi	Rawalpindi Cricket Stadium	Multan Cricket Stadium
Image				
Map	List of Pakistan Super League venues is located in Pakistan			

== Lists ==
=== General list ===
Venue	City	Country	Capacity	Matches played	Ref(s)
Dubai International Cricket Stadium	Dubai	UAE	25,000	60	
Sharjah Cricket Stadium	Sharjah	UAE	17,000	40	
Sheikh Zayed Cricket Stadium	Abu Dhabi	UAE	20,000	24	
Gaddafi Stadium	Lahore	Pakistan	27,000	41	
National Stadium	Karachi	Pakistan	34,000	59	
Rawalpindi Cricket Stadium	Rawalpindi	Pakistan	15,000	18	
Multan Cricket Stadium	Multan	Pakistan	35,000	8	

=== By matches played ===
Year	Venues							Total (in PSL)	Ref(s)
Year	UAE			Pakistan				Total (in PSL)	Ref(s)
Year	Dubai International Cricket Stadium	Sharjah Cricket Association Stadium	Sheikh Zayed Cricket Stadium	Gaddafi Stadium	National Stadium	Rawalpindi Cricket Stadium	Multan Cricket Stadium	Total (in PSL)	Ref(s)
2016	15	9	0	0	0	0	0	24	
2017	13	10	0	1	0	0	0	24	
2018	18	13	0	2	1	0	0	34	
2019	14	8	4	0	8	0	0	34	
2020	0	0	0	10	12	7	3	32 (Note: Two matches were abandoned due to rain, one each in Rawalpindi and Lahore.)	
2021	0	0	20	0	14	0	0	34	
2022	0	0	0	19	15	0	0	34	
2023	0	0	0	9	9	11	5	34	
Total (in stadium)	60	40	24	41	59	18	8	250	

== See also ==
- List of Pakistan Super League anthems
- List of Pakistan Super League records and statistics
