= 2019 Multan Sultans season =

Franchise cricket team in Pakistan Super League

Multan Sultans
2019 season
- Coach: Johan Botha
- Captain: Shoaib Malik
- PSL 2019: 5th (eliminated)
- Most runs: Shoaib Malik (266)
- Most wickets: Shahid Afridi (10)

The Multan Sultans is a franchise cricket team that represents Multan in the Pakistan Super League. The team made its PSL debut in the 2018 season. The team finished 5th after group stage matches, winning only three out of their ten matches and failing to reach the play-offs for the second consecutive year.

== Background ==
Multan Sultans are the sixth team to join the league. 2018 was their inaugural season. After the league was started in 2016, this was the first expansion of the league. Tom Moody serves as their coach. Prior to the start of the fourth season, Schon Properties failed to pay the $5.2 million annual fee, and Pakistan Cricket Board had cancelled their franchise. After the cancellation, the PCB took responsibility of all player and coach contracts while the public tender process took place to grant the repackaged rights of the team. The PCB asked interested bidders to collect the bidding documents from its offices by 14 December 2018. The financial proposal of the technically qualified bidders is due to be opened on 18 December 2018. On 20 December 2018, PSL announced that Ali Tareen-led Multan consortium had won the franchise rights for the sixth team for a seven-year period, by exceeding the PCB's reserve price set at $5.21 million per year. Tareen's bid was for $6.35 million per year, making this the most expensive franchise.

== Squad ==
- Players with international caps are shown in **bold**
- Ages are given as of the first match of the season, 14 February 2019

No.	Name	Nationality	Birth date	Batting style	Bowling style	Year signed	Notes
Batsmen
14	**James Vince**	England	14 March 1991 (aged 27)	Right-handed	Right-arm medium	2019	Overseas
30	**Shan Masood**	Pakistan	14 October 1989 (aged 29)	Left-handed	Right-arm medium-fast	2018	
1	Umar Siddiq	Pakistan	30 December 1992 (aged 26)	Left-handed	Right-arm off break	2018	
32	Laurie Evans	England	12 October 1987 (aged 31)	Right-handed	Right-arm medium-fast	2019	Overseas
49	**Steve Smith**	Australia	2 June 1989 (aged 29)	Right-handed	Right-arm leg spin	2019	Overseas
24	**Joe Denly**	England	16 March 1986 (aged 32)	Right-handed	Right-arm leg spin	2019	Overseas
All-rounders
7	Nauman Ali	Pakistan	7 October 1986 (aged 32)	Right-handed	Slow left-arm orthodox	2019	
10	**Shahid Afridi**	Pakistan	1 March 1980 (aged 38)	Right-handed	Right-arm leg spin	2019	
12	**Andre Russell**	West Indies	29 April 1988 (aged 30)	Right-handed	Right-arm fast	2019	Overseas
18	**Shoaib Malik**	Pakistan	1 February 1982 (aged 37)	Right-handed	Right-arm off break	2018	Captain
73	**Hammad Azam**	Pakistan	16 March 1991 (aged 27)	Right-handed	Right-arm medium	2019	
54	**Dan Christian**	Australia	4 May 1983 (aged 35)	Right-handed	Right-arm medium-fast	2019	Overseas
Wicket-keepers
29	**Nicholas Pooran**	West Indies	2 October 1995 (aged 23)	Left-handed	—	2018	Overseas
78	**Shakeel Ansar**	Pakistan	11 November 1978 (aged 40)	Right-handed	—	2019	
23	Tom Moores	England	4 September 1996 (aged 22)	Left-handed	—	2019	Overseas
25	**Johnson Charles**	West Indies	14 January 1989 (aged 30)	Right-handed	Slow left-arm orthodox	2019	Overseas
Bowlers
33	Ali Shafiq	Pakistan	16 November 1996 (aged 22)	Right-handed	Right-arm medium-fast	2019	
83	**Junaid Khan**	Pakistan	24 December 1989 (aged 29)	Right-handed	Left-arm fast	2018	
17	Irfan Khan	Pakistan	1 August 1989 (aged 29)	Right-handed	Right-arm leg break	2018	
26	**Mohammad Abbas**	Pakistan	10 March 1990 (aged 28)	Right-handed	Right-arm fast-medium	2018	
27	**Mohammad Irfan**	Pakistan	6 June 1982 (aged 36)	Right-handed	Left-arm fast	2019	
27	Mohammad Ilyas	Pakistan	21 March 1999 (aged 19)	Right-handed	Right-arm medium-fast	2019	
93	Chris Green	Australia	1 October 1993 (aged 25)	Right-handed	Right-arm off break	2019	Overseas
	Mohammad Junaid	Pakistan	21 March 2002 (aged 16)	Left-handed	Slow left-arm orthodox	2019	
32	Qais Ahmed	Afghanistan	15 August 2000 (aged 18)	Right-handed	Right-arm leg break	2019	Overseas

== Kit manufacturers and sponsors ==
Shirt sponsor (chest)	Shirt sponsor (back)	Chest branding	Sleeve branding
Pepsi	Afsaneh	Lay's	OLX, Asia Ghee Mill F.C.

Playing kit

== Points table ==
Pos	Team	Pld	W	L	T	NR	Pts	NRR
1	Peshawar Zalmi (R)	10	7	3	0	0	14	0.828
2	Quetta Gladiators (C)	10	7	3	0	0	14	0.376
3	Islamabad United (3rd)	10	5	5	0	0	10	0.127
4	Karachi Kings (4th)	10	5	5	0	0	10	−0.673
5	Multan Sultans	10	3	7	0	0	6	0.173
6	Lahore Qalandars	10	3	7	0	0	6	−0.837

Source: ESPNcricinfo
- The top 4 teams qualified for the playoffs
- Advanced to Qualifier
- Advanced to Eliminator 1

Notes:

- C = Champions;
- R = Runner-up;
- (x) = Position at the end of the tournament;

== Season summary ==
Multan Sultans started their season against Karachi Kings with a close defeat by just 7 runs. In the next game against Islamabad United they registered their first win after restricting the opponents to only 125 runs and managing to chase the target pretty easily. After their first five games, they lost 4 and won only once. They had their chance against Lahore Qalandars where they posted the highest total batting first of the tournament (200), but bad bowling in last few overs costed them the match, resulting in losing the match on the last ball. They won their second match of the season against Islamabad United by 6 wickets. Team's bad performance continued as they suffer three more loses, resulting in them being the first team to be eliminated from the season.

After playing ten matches, they managed to get over the line in three matches with the 3rd win coming against Lahore Qalandars in their final game of the season, played at National Stadium. As a result, They finished 5th on the points table for the second consecutive year.

Skipper Shoaib Malik was the team's leading runs-scorer with 266 runs, while Shahid Afridi with 10 wickets in 8 matches was the team's leading wicket-taker for the season.
