= Nadeem Omar =

Pakistani cricket patron

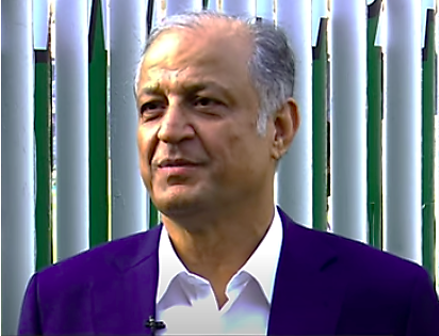
- Nadeem Omar in 2020
- Born: Karachi, Sindh, Pakistan
- Occupations: Business executive Former Scrabble player
- Known for: Owner of Quetta Gladiators

Nadeem Omar is a Pakistani business executive and former Scrabble player who is known nationally and internationally for his contributions to sports. He has been the president of the Pakistan Scrabble Association since October 2020 and the president of the Karachi City Cricket Association since May 2018. He is also the president of the Pakistan Cricket Club.

He is also the owner of the Pakistan Super League franchise Quetta Gladiators and Omar Associates.

== Early life and career ==
Nadeem Omar was born in 1957 in Karachi to a family of five siblings. He received his education from the Cantt Public School, Karachi. At the age of 17, he joined Merchant Marine Academy and upon graduation was inducted into the Pakistan National Shipping Corporation. He left Merchant Navy at the age of 34 as a chief officer.

In May 2018, he was elected the president of the Karachi City Cricket Association. In October 2020, he was elected the president of the Pakistan Scrabble Association after the retirement of Goshpi Avari.

He is the owner of Omar Associates.
