= 2019 Pakistan Super League =

4th edition of the Pakistan Super League

Pakistan Super League 2019
- Dates: 14 February – 17 March 2019
- Administrator: Pakistan Cricket Board
- Cricket format: Twenty20
- Tournament format(s): Double round robin and playoffs
- Hosts: United Arab Emirates; Pakistan
- Champions: Quetta Gladiators (1st title)
- Runners-up: Peshawar Zalmi
- Participants: 6
- Matches: 34
- Attendance: 495,817 (14,583 per match)
- Player of the series: Shane Watson (QG) (430 runs)
- Most runs: Shane Watson (QG) (430)
- Most wickets: Hasan Ali (PZ) (25)
- Official website: psl-t20.com

The 2019 Pakistan Super League, also known as PSL 4 and branded as HBL PSL 2019, was the fourth edition of the Pakistan Super League, a professional Twenty20 cricket league which was established by the Pakistan Cricket Board (PCB). The tournament took place from 14 February to 17 March 2019.

Quetta Gladiators won the 2019 edition by defeating Peshawar Zalmi by eight wickets in Karachi to win the title for the first time. Mohammad Hasnain of Quetta was named the Man of the Match for the final. Shane Watson, also of Quetta, was awarded the Player of the Tournament award and the leading run scorer award with a total of 435 runs in the tournament. Hasan Ali of Peshawar was awarded the leading wicket taker award for his 25 wickets in the tournament.

== Background ==
On 10 November 2018, PCB terminated franchise agreements with the owner of Multan Sultans, Schön Properties. Ali Khan Tareen later became the new owner of the team. On 14 November, PCB announced that HBL has renewed its partnership with PSL for 3 more years until 2021. On 21 December, Blitz Advertising won the broadcasting rights for 3 years on a bid of US$36 million, which is 358% greater amount than before.

== Broadcasting partners ==
The broadcasting rights of the 4th season of PSL were given to various Sports channels for covering the event in different countries. The broadcasting rights of the season in Pakistan were given to leading sports channels, PTV Sports & Geo Super, whereas in United States and Canada the rights were given to Willow TV. Hum TV was given the rights to broadcast the series in UK & Europe. The OTT rights for Middle-Eastern and North Africa Countries were given to Cricketgateway.

In case of India the broadcasting rights were given to DSports which partnered with Daily Fantasy Site, MyTeam11, to co-present PSL in India.

== Teams and squads ==
Each franchise retained up to 10 players during the trade and retention window that started on 29 September. A squad of 16 players, with 4 supplementary players, was then completed in players draft held at Islamabad on 20 November. On 16 December 2018, PSL announced that each team will have additional budget to select 21-member squad. The replacement draft was held on 24 January in Lahore.

| Islamabad United | Karachi Kings | Lahore Qalandars | Multan Sultans | Peshawar Zalmi | Quetta Gladiators |
|---|---|---|---|---|---|
| Mohammad Sami (c); Shadab Khan (vc); Faheem Ashraf; Asif Ali; Luke Ronchi; Rumman Raees; Hussain Talat; Sahibzada Farhan; ~~Ian Bell~~; Samit Patel; Waqas Maqsood; Zafar Gohar; Wayne Parnell; Phil Salt; Chadwick Walton; Cameron Delport; Muhammad Musa; Nasir Nawaz; ~~Zahir Khan~~; Amad Butt; Rizwan Hussain; Alex Hales | Imad Wasim (c); Colin Munro; Mohammad Amir; Babar Azam; Colin Ingram; Usman Shinwari; Mohammad Rizwan; Ravi Bopara; Sikandar Raza; Awais Zia; Usama Mir; Aaron Summers; Sohail Khan; Iftikhar Ahmed; Ali Imran; Abrar Ahmed; Aamer Yamin; Ben Dunk; Liam Livingstone; Jaahid Ali; Umer Khan | Fakhar Zaman (c); ~~AB de Villiers~~; ~~Mohammad Hafeez~~; Carlos Brathwaite; Corey Anderson; Haris Sohail; Hasan Khan; Rahat Ali; Yasir Shah; Shaheen Afridi; Anton Devcich; Agha Salman; Sohail Akhtar; Sandeep Lamichhane; Mohammad Imran; Umair Masood; Brendan Taylor; Gauhar Ali; Aizaz Cheema; Haris Rauf; Hardus Viljoen; David Wiese; Saad Ali; Salman Butt; ~~Ryan ten Doeschate~~; Riki Wessels; Asela Gunaratne | Shoaib Malik (c); ~~Steve Smith~~; Shahid Afridi; ~~Joe Denly~~; Junaid Khan; Mohammad Irfan; Shan Masood; Mohammad Abbas; Mohammad Irfan; Umar Siddiq; Mohammad Junaid; Qais Ahmad; ~~Nicholas Pooran~~; Chris Green; Laurie Evans; Nauman Ali; Mohammad Ilyas; Dan Christian; Tom Moores; Ali Shafiq; Shakeel Ansar; Andre Russell; James Vince; Hammad Azam; Johnson Charles | Darren Sammy (c); Wahab Riaz; Hasan Ali; Kamran Akmal; Kieron Pollard; Liam Dawson; Umaid Asif; Khalid Usman; Sameen Gul; Misbah-ul-Haq; Dawid Malan; Umar Amin; Wayne Madsen; Sohaib Maqsood; Jamal Anwar; Nabi Gul; Chris Jordan; ~~Waqar Salamkheil~~; Ibtisam Sheikh; Samiullah; Andre Fletcher; Imam-ul-Haq; Lendl Simmons; Tymal Mills | Sarfraz Ahmed (c); Shane Watson; Sunil Narine; Dwayne Bravo; Umar Akmal; Mohammad Nawaz; Rilee Rossouw; Sohail Tanvir; Anwar Ali; Saud Shakeel; Fawad Ahmed; Mohammad Asghar; Danish Aziz; Ahsan Ali; Ghulam Mudassar; ~~Naseem Shah~~; Harry Gurney; Ahmed Shehzad; Azam Khan; Jalat Khan; Dwayne Smith; Mohammad Irfan; Mohammad Hasnain; Max Waller |

== Venues ==
On 12 June 2018, the franchises and PCB officials in a meeting decided against the idea of having a full PSL fourth edition in Pakistan. The new PCB chairman Ehsan Mani announced on 15 September that tournament was to start from 14 February 2019 in UAE, and the last eight games were to be held in Pakistan along with the final that will be played on 17 March in Karachi.

For the first time, four PSL matches were played in Abu Dhabi.

Originally, three matches were scheduled to be played in Lahore but due to logistical and operational challenges posed by the delayed opening of Lahore airspace for commercial flights following military tensions between Pakistan and India, the matches were shifted to Karachi. Mani said that PCB had made a critical decision and the "headquarters of Pakistan cricket will be unable to host" 2019 PSL matches.

| United Arab Emirates | | | Pakistan | |
| Dubai | Sharjah | Abu Dhabi | ~~Lahore~~ | Karachi |
|---|---|---|---|---|
| Dubai International Cricket Stadium | Sharjah Cricket Stadium | Sheikh Zayed Cricket Stadium | ~~Gaddafi Stadium~~ | National Stadium |
| Capacity: 25,000 | Capacity: 17,000 | Capacity: 20,000 | ~~Capacity: 27,000~~ | Capacity: 32,000 |
| 2019 Pakistan Super League is located in United Arab Emirates | | | 2019 Pakistan Super League is located in Pakistan | |

== Match officials ==
=== Umpires ===
- Faisal Afridi
- Michael Gough
- Richard Illingworth
- Ranmore Martinesz
- Tariq Rasheed
- Ahsan Raza
- Shozab Raza
- Rashid Riaz
- Asif Yaqoob

=== Referees ===
- Mohammad Anees
- Muhammad Javed
- Roshan Mahanama

== Promotion in media ==
The league was promoted on social media by the hashtag #HBLPSL due to its title sponsor, and by its official anthem #KhelDeewanoKa.

=== Ceremonies ===
==== Opening ceremony ====
The opening ceremony was held on 14 February at Dubai International Cricket Stadium, prior to the first match of the season. It was started by the national anthems of UAE "Ishy Bilady", and of Pakistan "Qaumi Taranah" as usual. It then featured a marching band, which performed Europe's "The Final Countdown". Then, British singer Marcia Barrett, from German band Boney M., performed her band's song "Daddy Cool". Aima Baig and Shuja Haider performed on their rendition of Nazia Hassan and Zohaib Hassan's "Disco Deewane". Then members of Junoon band performed on their "Yaar Bina", "Heerey" and "Jazba-e-Junoon". The last performance included title anthem of the league's fourth season by Fawad Khan featuring Young Desi. Then, melody of Ali Zafar's previous anthems for PSL was played, followed by fireworks.

A list of artists to perform at the ceremony was officially released on 18 January, according to which American rapper Pitbull was also confirmed to perform, however, later he withdrew due to a technical fault in his plane's engine.

==== Closing ceremony ====
The closing ceremony of the league, hosted by Fakhar-e-Alam, was held at National Stadium, Karachi, on 17 March prior to the league's final match. One minute silence was observed in respect of the martyrs of Christchurch mosque shootings.

Then Abrar-ul-Haq performed his song "Nach Majajan". Aima Baig and Shuja Haider once again paid tribute to Nazia Hassan by performing "Dosti" and "Disco Deewane". Fawad Khan featuring Young Desi performed the title anthem of the league's fourth season. Sahir Ali Bagga then performed a patriotic song "Har Dil Ki Awaz". Last performance was by Junoon, who sang "Zamaane Ke Andaaz", "Khudi Ko Kar Buland", "Sayonee" and "Dil Dil Pakistan".

The Chief Minister of Sindh, Syed Murad Ali Shah, Spanish World Cup winning footballer Carles Puyol and the cast of the upcoming Pakistani film The Legend of Maula Jatt also appeared at the ceremony. Army Chief Gen. Qamar Javed Bajwa and Governor Sindh Imran Ismail also attended the final match.

=== Cancer awareness ===
International Child Hood Cancer Awareness Day was observed on 15 February with golden ribbon as a theme, while Breast Cancer Awareness Day was observed on 10 March with pink ribbon as a theme. The stadiums were also themed respectively.

== League stage ==
=== Format ===
The six teams all played 10 matches each and got 2 points for every win, none for a loss and 1 point for a no result. The top four teams in the group stage qualified for the play-offs.

=== Points table ===
| Pos | Team | Pld | W | L | T | NR | Pts | NRR |
|---|---|---|---|---|---|---|---|---|
| 1 | Peshawar Zalmi (R) | 10 | 7 | 3 | 0 | 0 | 14 | 0.828 |
| 2 | Quetta Gladiators (C) | 10 | 7 | 3 | 0 | 0 | 14 | 0.376 |
| 3 | Islamabad United (3rd) | 10 | 5 | 5 | 0 | 0 | 10 | 0.127 |
| 4 | Karachi Kings (4th) | 10 | 5 | 5 | 0 | 0 | 10 | −0.673 |
| 5 | Multan Sultans | 10 | 3 | 7 | 0 | 0 | 6 | 0.173 |
| 6 | Lahore Qalandars | 10 | 3 | 7 | 0 | 0 | 6 | −0.837 |

Source: ESPNcricinfo
- The top 4 teams qualified for the playoffs
- Advanced to Qualifier
- Advanced to Eliminator 1

Notes:

- C = Champions;
- R = Runner-up;
- (x) = Position at the end of the tournament;

=== Summary ===
| Visitor team → | IU | KK | LQ | MS | PZ | QG |
| Home team ↓ | IU | KK | LQ | MS | PZ | QG |
|---|---|---|---|---|---|---|
| Islamabad United | | Islamabad; 7 wickets | Islamabad; 5 wickets | Multan; 5 wickets | Islamabad; 12 runs | Quetta; 7 wickets |
| Karachi Kings | Islamabad; 5 wickets | | Lahore; 22 runs | Karachi; 7 runs | Peshawar; 61 runs | Karachi; 1 run |
| Lahore Qalandars | Islamabad; 49 runs | Karachi; 5 wickets | | Multan; 7 wickets | Peshawar; 7 wickets | Lahore; 8 wickets |
| Multan Sultans | Multan; 6 wickets | Karachi; 5 wickets | Lahore; 6 wickets | | Peshawar; 5 wickets | Quetta; 6 wickets |
| Peshawar Zalmi | Peshawar; 4 wickets | Peshawar; 44 runs | Peshawar; 4 wickets | Peshawar; 7 wickets | | Quetta; 6 wickets |
| Quetta Gladiators | Quetta; 43 runs | Karachi; 6 wickets | Quetta; 3 wickets | Quetta; 8 wickets | Quetta; 8 wickets | |

| Home team won | Visitor team won |

- Note: Results listed are according to the home (horizontal) and visitor (vertical) teams.
- Note: Click on a result to see a summary of the match.

=== League progression ===
| Team | Group matches | | | | | | | | | | Playoffs | | |
| Team | 1 | 2 | 3 | 4 | 5 | 6 | 7 | 8 | 9 | 10 | E1/Q | E2 | F |
|---|---|---|---|---|---|---|---|---|---|---|---|---|---|
| Islamabad United | 2 | 2 | 2 | 4 | 6 | 6 | 8 | 8 | 8 | 10 | W | L | |
| Karachi Kings | 2 | 2 | 2 | 2 | 4 | 4 | 6 | 8 | 10 | 10 | L | | |
| Lahore Qalandars | 0 | 2 | 2 | 4 | 4 | 6 | 6 | 6 | 6 | 6 | | | |
| Multan Sultans | 0 | 2 | 2 | 2 | 2 | 4 | 4 | 4 | 4 | 6 | | | |
| Peshawar Zalmi | 0 | 2 | 4 | 4 | 6 | 8 | 10 | 10 | 12 | 14 | L | W | L |
| Quetta Gladiators | 2 | 4 | 6 | 8 | 8 | 8 | 10 | 12 | 14 | 14 | W | | W |

| Win | Loss | No result |

- Note: The total points at the end of each group match are listed.
- Note: Click on the points (group matches) or W/L (playoffs) to see the match summary.

== Fixtures ==
The complete fixture schedule was released on 13 December 2018. (Note: All times are in UTC+5 (PST)) On 3 March 2019, the updated schedule for Pakistan round was released.

14 February 2019
22:45 (D/N)
Scorecard

| Lahore Qalandars; 171/8 (20 overs) | v | Islamabad United; 177/5 (19.2 overs) |
| Fakhar Zaman 65 (44); Faheem Ashraf 2/24 (4 overs) | | Hussain Talat 37 (30); Rahat Ali 4/29 (4 overs) |

Islamabad won by 5 wickets
Dubai International Cricket Stadium, Dubai
Umpires: Richard Illingworth (Eng) and Rashid Riaz (Pak)
Player of the match: Faheem Ashraf (Islamabad United)

- Islamabad United won the toss and elected to field.

15 February 2019
16:30 (D/N)
Scorecard

| Karachi Kings; 183/6 (20 overs) | v | Multan Sultans; 176/9 (20 overs) |
| Liam Livingstone 82 (43); Chris Green 3/32 (4 overs) | | Shoaib Malik 52 (28); Mohammad Amir 4/25 (4 overs) |

Karachi won by 7 runs
Dubai International Cricket Stadium, Dubai
Umpires: Michael Gough (Eng) and Ranmore Martinesz (SL)
Player of the match: Liam Livingstone (Karachi Kings)

- Karachi Kings won the toss and elected to bat.
- Umer Khan (Karachi Kings) and Mohammad Ilyas (Multan Sultans) both made their T20 debuts.

15 February 2019
21:00 (D/N)
Scorecard

| Peshawar Zalmi; 155/4 (20 overs) | v | Quetta Gladiators; 161/4 (19.4 overs) |
| Misbah-ul-Haq 49* (32); Mohammad Nawaz 2/25 (4 overs) | | Umar Akmal 75* (50); Wahab Riaz 2/18 (4 overs) |

Quetta won by 6 wickets
Dubai International Cricket Stadium, Dubai
Umpires: Richard Illingworth (Eng) and Shozab Raza (Pak)
Player of the match: Umar Akmal (Quetta Gladiators)

- Quetta Gladiators won the toss and elected to field.

16 February 2019
16:30 (D/N)
Scorecard

| Islamabad United; 125/7 (20 overs) | v | Multan Sultans; 126/5 (18.4 overs) |
| Luke Ronchi 51 (33); Ali Shafiq 2/11 (4 overs) | | Shoaib Malik 31* (29); Shadab Khan 2/20 (4 overs) |

Multan won by 5 wickets
Dubai International Cricket Stadium, Dubai
Umpires: Ranmore Martinesz (SL) and Asif Yaqoob (Pak)
Player of the match: Ali Shafiq (Multan Sultans)

- Multan Sultans won the toss and elected to field.

16 February 2019
21:00 (D/N)
Scorecard

| Lahore Qalandars; 138/6 (20 overs) | v | Karachi Kings; 116 (19.5 overs) |
| Sohail Akhtar 39 (25); Umer Khan 2/25 (4 overs) | | Mohammad Rizwan 34 (33); Haris Rauf 4/23 (4 overs) |

Lahore won by 22 runs
Dubai International Cricket Stadium, Dubai
Umpires: Richard Illingworth (Eng) and Shozab Raza (Pak)
Player of the match: Haris Rauf (Lahore Qalandars)

- Karachi Kings won the toss and elected to field.

17 February 2019
16:30 (D/N)
Scorecard

| Islamabad United; 157/8 (20 overs) | v | Quetta Gladiators; 161/3 (18.2 overs) |
| Wayne Parnell 41 (20); Sohail Tanvir 4/21 (4 overs) | | Shane Watson 81* (55); Samit Patel 1/15 (3 overs) |

Quetta won by 7 wickets
Dubai International Cricket Stadium, Dubai
Umpires: Ranmore Martinesz (SL) and Asif Yaqoob (Pak)
Player of the match: Shane Watson (Quetta Gladiators)

- Quetta Gladiators won the toss and elected to field.

17 February 2019
21:00 (D/N)
Scorecard

| Lahore Qalandars; 78 (15.1 overs) | v | Peshawar Zalmi; 81/3 (10.1 overs) |
| Anton Devcich 18 (19); Hasan Ali 4/15 (4 overs) | | Umar Amin 61* (39); Rahat Ali 1/9 (2 overs) |

Peshawar won by 7 wickets
Dubai International Cricket Stadium, Dubai
Umpires: Richard Illingworth (Eng) and Rashid Riaz (Pak)
Player of the match: Hasan Ali (Peshawar Zalmi)

- Peshawar Zalmi won the toss and elected to field.

20 February 2019
21:00 (D/N)
Scorecard

| Multan Sultans; 160/9 (20 overs) | v | Quetta Gladiators; 161/2 (18.2 overs) |
| Shoaib Malik 53 (37); Mohammad Irfan Jr. 2/32 (4 overs) | | Rilee Rossouw 67* (45); Mohammad Irfan 1/26 (4 overs) |

Quetta won by 8 wickets
Sharjah Cricket Stadium, Sharjah
Umpires: Shozab Raza (Pak) and Asif Yaqoob (Pak)
Player of the match: Shane Watson (Quetta Gladiators)

- Quetta Gladiators won the toss and elected to field.

21 February 2019
21:00 (D/N)
Scorecard

| Peshawar Zalmi; 153/8 (20 overs) | v | Karachi Kings; 109/9 (20 overs) |
| Imam-ul-Haq 56 (43); Sikandar Raza 2/23 (4 overs) | | Mohammad Rizwan 32* (27); Hasan Ali 4/15 (4 overs) |

Peshawar won by 44 runs
Sharjah Cricket Stadium, Sharjah
Umpires: Richard Illingworth (Eng) and Rashid Riaz (Pak)
Player of the match: Imam-ul-Haq (Peshawar Zalmi)

- Karachi Kings won the toss and elected to field.

22 February 2019
16:30 (D/N)
Scorecard

| Multan Sultans; 200/6 (20 overs) | v | Lahore Qalandars; 204/4 (20 overs) |
| James Vince 84 (41); Sandeep Lamichhane 3/46 (4 overs) | | Fakhar Zaman 63 (35); Junaid Khan 3/39 (4 overs) |

Lahore won by 6 wickets
Sharjah Cricket Stadium, Sharjah
Umpires: Ranmore Martinesz (SL) and Shozab Raza (Pak)
Player of the match: AB de Villiers (Lahore Qalandars)

- Lahore Qalandars won the toss and elected to field.

22 February 2019
21:00 (D/N)
Scorecard

| Islamabad United; 158/9 (20 overs) | v | Peshawar Zalmi; 146 (19.4 overs) |
| Ian Bell 54 (46); Sameen Gul 3/29 (4 overs) | | Kieron Pollard 51 (22); Mohammad Sami 3/22 (3.4 overs) |

Islamabad won by 12 runs
Sharjah Cricket Stadium, Sharjah
Umpires: Michael Gough (Eng) and Richard Illingworth (Eng)
Player of the match: Mohammad Sami (Islamabad United)

- Peshawar Zalmi won the toss and elected to field.
- Muhammad Musa (Islamabad United) made his T20 debut.
- Mohammad Sami (Islamabad United) became the first player in the team, and fourth overall in PSL history to take a hat-trick.

23 February 2019
16:30 (D/N)
Scorecard

| Lahore Qalandars; 143/7 (20 overs) | v | Quetta Gladiators; 148/7 (20 overs) |
| AB de Villiers 45* (40); Ghulam Mudassar 3/21 (4 overs) | | Sarfraz Ahmed 52* (36); Haris Rauf 2/25 (4 overs) |

Quetta won by 3 wickets
Sharjah Cricket Stadium, Sharjah
Umpires: Ranmore Martinesz (SL) and Shozab Raza (Pak)
Player of the match: Sarfraz Ahmed (Quetta Gladiators)

- Quetta Gladiators won the toss and elected to field.

23 February 2019
21:00 (D/N)
Scorecard

| Karachi Kings; 143/6 (20 overs) | v | Islamabad United; 147/3 (16.1 over) |
| Ben Dunk 49* (32); Faheem Ashraf 3/26 (4 overs) | | Luke Ronchi 67* (35); Imad Wasim 2/27 (4 overs) |

Islamabad won by 7 wickets
Sharjah Cricket Stadium, Sharjah
Umpires: Richard Illingworth (Eng) and Asif Yaqoob (Pak)
Player of the match: Luke Ronchi (Islamabad United)

- Islamabad United won the toss and elected to field.

24 February 2019
16:30 (D/N)
Scorecard

| Multan Sultans; 145 (20 overs) | v | Peshawar Zalmi; 146/5 (19.4 overs) |
| Johnson Charles 53 (34); Hasan Ali 4/17 (4 overs) | | Imam-ul-Haq 52 (44); Dan Christian 2/22 (3 overs) |

Peshawar won by 5 wickets
Sharjah Cricket Stadium, Sharjah
Umpires: Ranmore Martinesz (SL) and Shozab Raza (Pak)
Player of the match: Hasan Ali (Peshawar Zalmi)

- Peshawar Zalmi won the toss and elected to field.

24 February 2019
21:00 (D/N)
Scorecard

| Quetta Gladiators; 186/5 (20 overs) | v | Karachi Kings; 188/4 (18.4 overs) |
| Umar Akmal 55 (37); Aamer Yamin 3/37 (4 overs) | | Colin Ingram 127* (59); Sohail Tanvir 2/21 (4 overs) |

Karachi won by 6 wickets
Sharjah Cricket Stadium, Sharjah
Umpires: Richard Illingworth (Eng) and Ahsan Raza (Pak)
Player of the match: Colin Ingram (Karachi Kings)

- Karachi Kings won the toss and elected to field.
- Colin Ingram (Karachi Kings) became the first player in the team and the first overseas player to score a century, and the highest individual scorer in the PSL history at that time.

26 February 2019
21:00 (D/N)
Scorecard

| Islamabad United; 121 (17.4 overs) | v | Multan Sultans; 122/4 (18.1 overs) |
| Luke Ronchi 32 (16); Dan Christian 3/19 (1.4 overs) | | Umar Siddiq 46 (45); Shadab Khan 1/16 (4 overs) |

Multan won by 6 wickets
Dubai International Cricket Stadium, Dubai
Umpires: Richard Illingworth (Eng) and Ahsan Raza (Pak)
Player of the match: Dan Christian (Multan Sultans)

- Multan Sultans won the toss and elected to field.

27 February 2019
16:30 (D/N)
Scorecard

| Quetta Gladiators; 106 (19.1 overs) | v | Lahore Qalandars; 107/2 (16.3 overs) |
| Ahsan Ali 33 (25); Sandeep Lamichhane 4/10 (4 overs) | | AB de Villiers 47* (38); Harry Gurney 1/13 (2 overs) |

Lahore won by 8 wickets
Dubai International Cricket Stadium, Dubai
Umpires: Ranmore Martinesz (SL) and Shozab Raza (Pak)
Player of the match: Sandeep Lamichhane (Lahore Qalandars)

- Lahore Qalandars won the toss and elected to field.
- Mohammad Hasnain (Quetta Gladiators) made his T20 debut.

27 February 2019
21:00 (D/N)
Scorecard

| Karachi Kings; 168/8 (20 overs) | v | Islamabad United; 169/5 (19.2 overs) |
| Babar Azam 68 (50); Rumman Raees 3/27 (4 overs) | | Asif Ali 70 (38); Umer Khan 2/29 (4 overs) |

Islamabad won by 5 wickets
Dubai International Cricket Stadium, Dubai
Umpires: Richard Illingworth (Eng) and Ahsan Raza (Pak)
Player of the match: Asif Ali (Islamabad United)

- Islamabad United won the toss and elected to field.

28 February 2019
16:30 (D/N)
Scorecard

| Multan Sultans; 172/5 (20 overs) | v | Peshawar Zalmi; 176/3 (19.2 overs) |
| Johnson Charles 57 (31); Liam Dawson 1/26 (3 overs) | | Umar Amin 54* (37); Shahid Afridi 1/9 (1 over) |

Peshawar won by 7 wickets
Dubai International Cricket Stadium, Dubai
Umpires: Ranmore Martinesz (SL) and Asif Yaqoob (Pak)
Player of the match: Kieron Pollard (Peshawar Zalmi)

- Peshawar Zalmi won the toss and elected to field.

28 February 2019
21:00 (D/N)
Scorecard

| Lahore Qalandars; 133/5 (20 overs) | v | Karachi Kings; 134/5 (19.1 overs) |
| AB de Villiers 33 (32); Iftikhar Ahmed 2/4 (2 overs) | | Liam Livingstone 38 (34); Sandeep Lamichhane 2/17 (4 overs) |

Karachi won by 5 wickets
Dubai International Cricket Stadium, Dubai
Umpires: Richard Illingworth (Eng) and Rashid Riaz (Pak)
Player of the match: Iftikhar Ahmed (Karachi Kings)

- Karachi Kings won the toss and elected to field.

1 March 2019
16:30 (D/N)
Scorecard

| Islamabad United; 176 (20 overs) | v | Peshawar Zalmi; 177/6 (20 overs) |
| Cameron Delport 71 (55); Wahab Riaz 2/20 (4 overs) | | Liam Dawson 52* (35); Shadab Khan 2/21 (4 overs) |

Peshawar won by 4 wickets
Dubai International Cricket Stadium, Dubai
Umpires: Ranmore Martinesz (SL) and Shozab Raza (Pak)
Player of the match: Liam Dawson (Peshawar Zalmi)

- Peshawar Zalmi won the toss and elected to field.

1 March 2019
21:00 (D/N)
Scorecard

| Multan Sultans; 121 (20 overs) | v | Quetta Gladiators; 122/4 (19 overs) |
| Johnson Charles 46 (36); Sohail Tanvir 3/19 (4 overs); Dwayne Bravo 3/19 (4 overs) | | Rilee Rossouw 35 (33); Shahid Afridi 2/18 (4 overs) |

Quetta won by 6 wickets
Dubai International Cricket Stadium, Dubai
Umpires: Richard Illingworth (Eng) and Ahsan Raza (Pak)
Player of the match: Dwayne Bravo (Quetta Gladiators)

- Quetta Gladiators won the toss and elected to field.

4 March 2019
16:30 (D/N)
Scorecard

| Peshawar Zalmi; 165/4 (20 overs) | v | Quetta Gladiators; 166/2 (17.4 overs) |
| Kamran Akmal 72 (50); Mohammad Nawaz 1/24 (4 overs) | | Shane Watson 91* (55); Sameen Gul 1/34 (4 overs) |

Quetta won by 8 wickets
Sheikh Zayed Cricket Stadium, Abu Dhabi
Umpires: Ranmore Martinesz (SL) and Asif Yaqoob (Pak)
Player of the match: Shane Watson (Quetta Gladiators)

- Quetta Gladiators won the toss and elected to field.
- Quetta Gladiators qualified for the playoffs.

4 March 2019
21:00 (D/N)
Scorecard

| Multan Sultans; 118/7 (20 overs) | v | Karachi Kings; 120/5 (19.2 overs) |
| Hammad Azam 29 (30); Usman Shinwari 4/15 (4 overs) | | Liam Livingstone 53* (42); Mohammad Ilyas 3/27 (4 overs) |

Karachi won by 5 wickets
Sheikh Zayed Cricket Stadium, Abu Dhabi
Umpires: Richard Illingworth (Eng) and Shozab Raza (Pak)
Player of the match: Usman Shinwari (Karachi Kings)

- Karachi Kings won the toss and elected to field.
- Multan Sultans were knocked-out of the playoffs.

5 March 2019
16:30 (D/N)
Scorecard

| Lahore Qalandars; 124/7 (20 overs) | v | Peshawar Zalmi; 125/6 (19.5 overs) |
| Haris Sohail 43 (33); Tymal Mills 3/29 (4 overs) | | Misbah-ul-Haq 59* (55); Shaheen Afridi 3/17 (4 overs) |

Peshawar won by 4 wickets
Sheikh Zayed Cricket Stadium, Abu Dhabi
Umpires: Ahsan Raza (Pak) and Asif Yaqoob (Pak)
Player of the match: Misbah-ul-Haq (Peshawar Zalmi)

- Peshawar Zalmi won the toss and elected to field.
- Peshawar Zalmi qualified for the playoffs.
- Peshawar Zalmi's score of 20 at the end of the powerplay equalled the record low total

5 March 2019
21:00 (D/N)
Scorecard

| Quetta Gladiators; 180/9 (20 overs) | v | Islamabad United; 137/9 (20 overs) |
| Ahmed Shehzad 73 (46); Faheem Ashraf 4/18 (3 overs) | | Luke Ronchi 64 (43); Fawad Ahmed 3/26 (4 overs) |

Quetta won by 43 runs
Sheikh Zayed Cricket Stadium, Abu Dhabi
Umpires: Richard Illingworth (Eng) and Rashid Riaz (Pak)
Player of the match: Ahmed Shehzad (Quetta Gladiators)

- Islamabad United won the toss and elected to field.
- Azam Khan (Quetta Gladiators) made his T20 debut.

9 March 2019
19:00 (D/N)
Scorecard

| Islamabad United; 238/3 (20 overs) | v | Lahore Qalandars; 189/9 (20 overs) |
| Cameron Delport 117* (60); David Wiese 1/44 (4 overs) | | Sohail Akhtar 75 (34); Faheem Ashraf 6/19 (4 overs) |

Islamabad won by 49 runs
National Stadium, Karachi
Umpires: Michael Gough (Eng) and Shozab Raza (Pak)
Player of the match: Cameron Delport (Islamabad United)

- Lahore Qalandars won the toss and elected to field.
- Islamabad United qualified for the playoffs.
- Cameron Delport (Islamabad United) scored the fastest century in PSL history at that time.
- Islamabad United made the highest team score in PSL's history.
- Shaheen Afridi (Lahore Qalandars) bowled the most expensive bowling spell (62 runs) in the tournament's history.

10 March 2019
19:00 (D/N)
Scorecard

| Karachi Kings; 190/5 (20 overs) | v | Quetta Gladiators; 189/7 (20 overs) |
| Babar Azam 56 (46); Mohammad Hasnain 2/38 (4 overs) | | Ahmed Shehzad 99 (57); Umer Khan 3/26 (4 overs) |

Karachi won by 1 run
National Stadium, Karachi
Umpires: Ranmore Martinesz (SL) and Asif Yaqoob (Pak)
Player of the match: Usman Shinwari (Karachi Kings)

- Quetta Gladiators won the toss and elected to field.
- Karachi Kings qualified for the playoffs, while Lahore Qalandars were knocked-out of the playoffs.

11 March 2019
14:00 (D/N)
Scorecard

| Lahore Qalandars; 140/8 (20 overs) | v | Multan Sultans; 141/3 (12.3 overs) |
| Fakhar Zaman 53 (36); Mohammad Abbas 3/22 (4 overs) | | Shan Masood 48 (25); David Wiese 1/15 (2 overs) |

Multan won by 7 wickets
National Stadium, Karachi
Umpires: Michael Gough (Eng) and Shozab Raza (Pak)
Player of the match: Mohammad Abbas (Multan Sultans)

- Multan Sultans won the toss and elected to field.
- Multan Sultans score of 78 in the powerplay equalled the PSL record at that time

11 March 2019
19:00 (D/N)
Scorecard

| Peshawar Zalmi; 203/7 (20 overs) | v | Karachi Kings; 142 (16.2 overs) |
| Kamran Akmal 86 (48); Mohammad Amir 3/24 (4 overs) | | Colin Ingram 71 (37); Hasan Ali 3/15 (3.2 overs) |

Peshawar won by 61 runs
National Stadium, Karachi
Umpires: Ranmore Martinesz (SL) and Ahsan Raza (Pak)
Player of the match: Kamran Akmal (Peshawar Zalmi)

- Karachi Kings won the toss and elected to field.

== Playoffs ==
Semifinals
13 March — Karachi
1 | Peshawar Zalmi | 176/7 (20 overs)
2 | Quetta Gladiators | 186/6 (20 overs)
14 March — Karachi
3 | Islamabad United | 164/6 (19.3 overs)
4 | Karachi Kings | 161/9 (20 overs)

Preliminary final
15 March — Karachi
1 | Peshawar Zalmi | 214/5 (20 overs)
3 | Islamabad United | 166/9 (20 overs)

Final
17 March — Karachi
2 | Quetta Gladiators | 139/2 (17.5 overs)
1 | Peshawar Zalmi | 138/8 (20 overs)

=== Qualifier ===
13 March 2019
19:00 (D/N)
Scorecard

| Quetta Gladiators; 186/6 (20 overs) | v | Peshawar Zalmi; 176/7 (20 overs) |
| Shane Watson 71 (43); Wahab Riaz 2/26 (4 overs) | | Darren Sammy 46 (21); Mohammad Hasnain 2/28 (4 overs) |

Quetta won by 10 runs
National Stadium, Karachi
Umpires: Ranmore Martinesz (SL) and Ahsan Raza (Pak)
Player of the match: Shane Watson (Quetta Gladiators)

- Peshawar Zalmi won the toss and elected to field.
- Quetta Gladiators advanced to the final.
- Fawad Ahmed was injured during the match, and went through surgery.
- Shane Watson bowled for the first time since 2018 Indian Premier League.

=== Eliminators ===
==== Eliminator 1 ====
14 March 2019
19:00 (D/N)
Scorecard

| Karachi Kings; 161/9 (20 overs) | v | Islamabad United; 164/6 (19.3 overs) |
| Babar Azam 42 (32); Muhammad Musa 3/42 (4 overs) | | Alex Hales 41 (42); Umer Khan 2/16 (4 overs) |

Islamabad won by 4 wickets
National Stadium, Karachi
Umpires: Michael Gough (Eng) and Shozab Raza (Pak)
Player of the match: Alex Hales (Islamabad United)

- Karachi Kings won the toss and elected to bat.
- Karachi Kings were eliminated from the tournament.

==== Eliminator 2 ====
15 March 2019
19:00 (D/N)
Scorecard

| Peshawar Zalmi; 214/5 (20 overs) | v | Islamabad United; 166/9 (20 overs) |
| Kamran Akmal 74 (43); Cameron Delport 2/24 (3 overs) | | Chadwick Walton 48 (29); Chris Jordan 3/26 (4 overs) |

Peshawar won by 48 runs
National Stadium, Karachi
Umpires: Ranmore Martinesz (SL) and Ahsan Raza (Pak)
Player of the match: Kamran Akmal (Peshawar Zalmi)

- Islamabad United won the toss and elected to field.
- Peshawar Zalmi advanced to the final while Islamabad United were eliminated from the tournament.

=== Final ===
17 March 2019
20:00 (D/N)
Scorecard

| Peshawar Zalmi; 138/8 (20 overs) | v | Quetta Gladiators; 139/2 (17.5 overs) |
| Umar Amin 38 (33); Mohammad Hasnain 3/30 (4 overs) | | Ahmed Shehzad 58* (51); Wahab Riaz 1/19 (4 overs) |

Quetta won by 8 wickets
National Stadium, Karachi
Umpires: Ranmore Martinesz (SL) and Ahsan Raza (Pak)
Player of the match: Mohammad Hasnain (Quetta Gladiators)

- Quetta Gladiators won the toss and elected to field.

== Awards and statistics ==
=== Most runs ===
| Player | Team | Mat | Inns | Runs | HS |
|---|---|---|---|---|---|
| Shane Watson | Quetta Gladiators | 12 | 12 | 430 | 91* |
| Kamran Akmal | Peshawar Zalmi | 13 | 13 | 357 | 86 |
| Cameron Delport | Islamabad United | 12 | 12 | 355 | 117* |
| Colin Ingram | Karachi Kings | 11 | 11 | 344 | 127* |
| Imam-ul-Haq | Peshawar Zalmi | 12 | 12 | 341 | 59 |
Source: ESPNcricinfo.com, Last updated: 17 March 2019

- Shane Watson of Quetta Gladiators received the Green Cap.

=== Most wickets ===
| Player | Team | Mat | Inns | Wkts | BBI |
|---|---|---|---|---|---|
| Hasan Ali | Peshawar Zalmi | 13 | 13 | 25 | 4/15 |
| Faheem Ashraf | Islamabad United | 12 | 12 | 21 | 6/19 |
| Wahab Riaz | Peshawar Zalmi | 13 | 13 | 17 | 4/10 |
| Umer Khan | Karachi Kings | 11 | 10 | 15 | 3/22 |
| Sohail Tanvir | Quetta Gladiators | 12 | 12 | 15 | 4/21 |
Source: ESPNcricinfo.com, Last updated: 17 March 2019

- Hasan Ali of Peshawar Zalmi received the Maroon Cap.

== See also ==
- Islamabad United in 2019
- Karachi Kings in 2019
- Lahore Qalandars in 2019
- Multan Sultans in 2019
- Peshawar Zalmi in 2019
- Quetta Gladiators in 2019
