= Umer Khan (cricketer) =

Pakistani cricketer (born 1999)

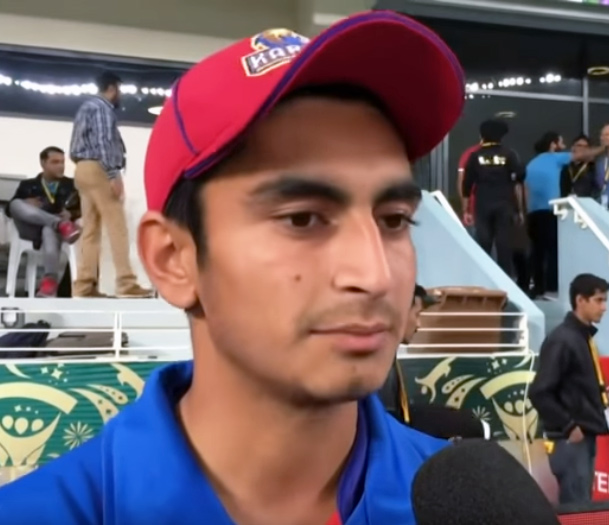

Personal information
- Born: 5 August 1999 (age 27); Rawalpindi, Punjab, Pakistan
- Batting: Left-handed
- Bowling: Slow left-arm orthodox
- Role: Bowler

Domestic team information
- Years: Team
- 2019: Karachi Kings
- 2019–2020: Northern
- 2025-present: Chicago Kingsmen
- Source: Cricinfo, 7 January 2018

Umer Khan (born 5 August 1999) is a Pakistani cricketer. Brought up in Taxila, Umer was picked by Nadeem Khan when he was managing director of the United Bank Limited cricket team in Peshawar.

== Career ==
He made his List A debut for United Bank Limited in the 2017–18 Departmental One Day Cup on 7 January 2018. He made his first-class debut for Sui Southern Gas Company in the 2018–19 Quaid-e-Azam Trophy on 7 November 2018.

He made his Twenty20 debut for the Karachi Kings in the 2019 Pakistan Super League on 15 February 2019. Following the conclusion of the competition, he was named as the Emerging Player of the tournament.

In September 2019, he was named in Khyber Pakhtunkhwa's squad for the 2019–20 Quaid-e-Azam Trophy tournament. In November 2019, he was named in Pakistan's squad for the 2019 ACC Emerging Teams Asia Cup in Bangladesh.

In 2025, he moved to USA and was included in Chicago Kingsmen's squad for the 2025 Top End T20 Series.
