= Islamabad Cricket Stadium =

Under-construction cricket stadium in Islamabad, Pakistan

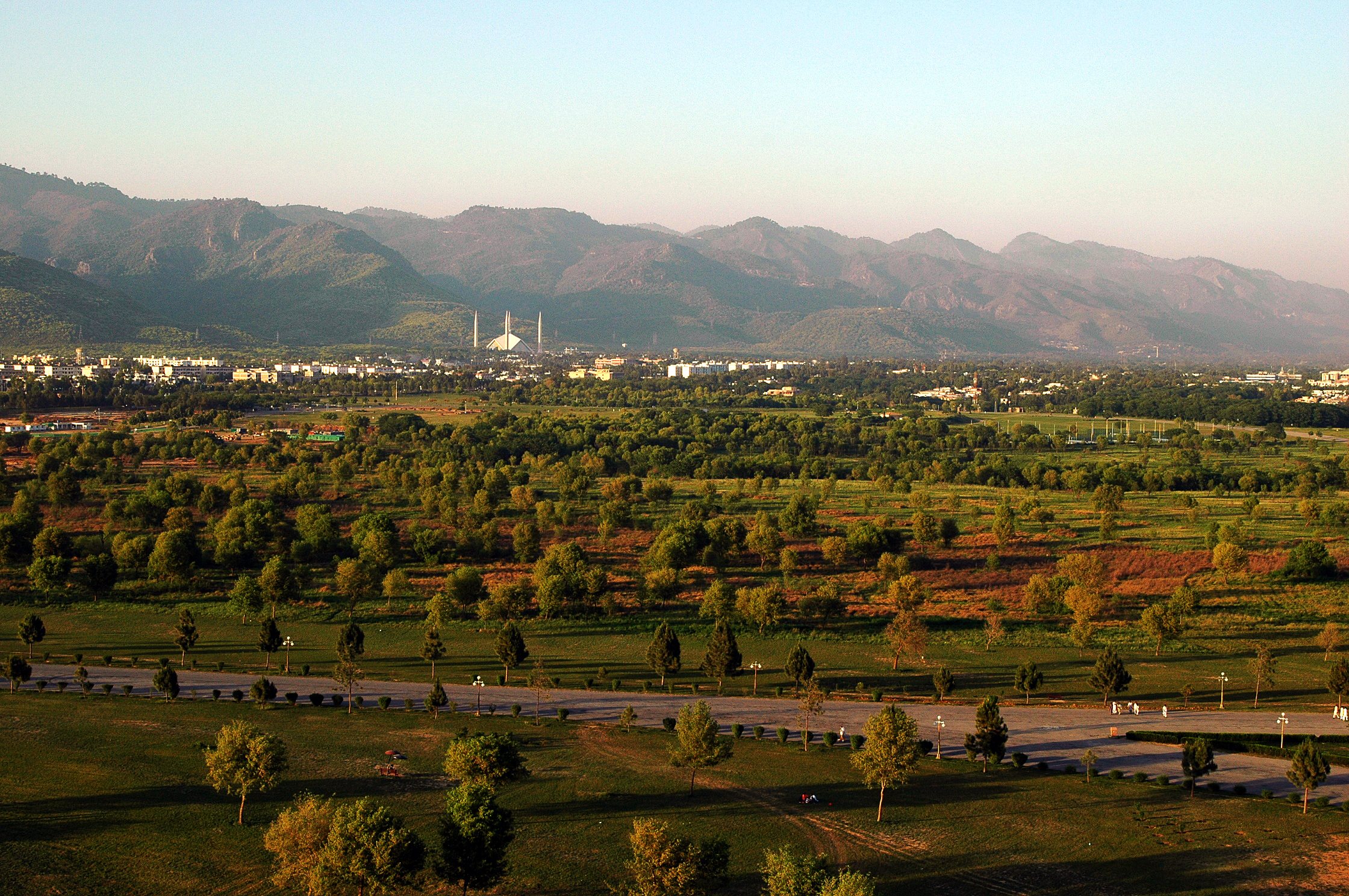
- Interactive map of Islamabad Cricket Stadium
- Location: Islamabad, Pakistan
- Coordinates: 33°42′07″N 73°01′22″E
- Owner: Capital Development Authority (Pakistan); Pakistan Cricket Board
- Operator: Pakistan Cricket Board

Construction
- Groundbreaking: TBD
- Cost: TBD
- Architect: TBD

Tenants
- Islamabad United (planned); Pakistan national cricket team (planned)

Islamabad Cricket Stadium is a state-of-the-art under-construction cricket stadium in Islamabad, Pakistan. The project was initiated on the directives of chairman Pakistan Cricket Board and Federal Minister of Interior, Mohsin Naqvi.

== Construction ==
In December 2025, the Capital Development Authority (CDA) and the Pakistan Cricket Board (PCB) reviewed a new concept design for Islamabad's first international standard cricket stadium. The proposed location is near Sector D12 in the Margalla foothills and the expected seating capacity is around 32,000 spectators.

The project plan also includes a parking facility for nearly 10,000 vehicles. The parking area will be located about one kilometer away from the stadium for public convenience.

According to CDA officials, the originally approved PC1 estimated the project at 12 billion Pakistani rupees. After design revisions, the cost was reduced to nearly 8 billion rupees.

Officials stated that once the tendering process is completed, construction work could begin immediately. The estimated time for full project completion including the main structure is almost two years.

These new plans follow many years of delays and changes in the proposed site. Earlier proposals such as the stadium at Shakarparian were canceled.

== Facilities ==
The stadium's design incorporates a high-performance center and is set to serve as the venue for a diverse array of both international and local tournaments and fixtures. Additionally, it will feature a five-star hotel designed to accommodate visiting international teams. This not only enhances their security but also contributes to alleviating traffic congestion throughout the entire city.
