= 2019 Lahore Qalandars season =

Cricket team in the Pakistan Super League

Lahore Qalandars
2019 season
- Coach: Aaqib Javed
- Captain: Mohammad Hafeez (2 matches); AB De Villiers (2 matches); Fakhar Zaman (6 matches)
- PSL 2019: 6th (eliminated)
- Most runs: Fakhar Zaman (285)
- Most wickets: Sandeep Lamichhane (11)

The Lahore Qalandars cricket team is one of six teams that competed in the 2019 Pakistan Super League, representing Lahore.

Originally the Qalandars were to be captained by Mohammad Hafeez, but due to an injury, he was unable to participate. AB De Villiers captained two matches while Fakhar Zaman led the team in six matches. They finished sixth in the season after winning three of their ten matches, and as a result, were eliminated in the group stage for the fourth consecutive year. Lahore Qalandars Brand Ambassador Shaheen Shah Afridi is a renowned bowler.

== Squad ==
- Players with international caps are shown in **bold**
- Ages are given as of the first match of the season, 14 February 2019

No.	Name	Nationality	Birth date	Batting style	Bowling style	Year signed	Notes
Batsmen
01	**Salman Butt**	Pakistan	7 October 1984 (aged 34)	Left-handed	Right-arm off spin	2019	
17	**AB de Villiers**	South Africa	17 February 1984 (aged 34)	Right-handed	Right-arm medium	2019	Overseas
23	Agha Salman	Pakistan	23 November 1993 (aged 25)	Right-handed	Right-arm off break	2018	
39	**Fakhar Zaman**	Pakistan	10 April 1990 (aged 28)	Left-handed	Left-arm orthodox spin	2019	Vice captain
89	**Haris Sohail**	Pakistan	9 January 1989 (aged 30)	Right-handed	Slow left-arm orthodox	2019	
81	Sohail Akhtar	Pakistan	2 March 1986 (aged 32)	Right-handed	Right-arm medium	2018	
	Saad Ali	Pakistan	5 October 1994 (aged 24)	Left-handed	Right-arm medium	2019	
All-rounders
8	**Mohammad Hafeez**	Pakistan	17 October 1980 (aged 38)	Right-handed	Right-arm off break	2019	Captain
16	Hasan Khan	Pakistan	16 October 1998 (aged 20)	Right-handed	slow left-arm orthodox	2019	
26	**Carlos Brathwaite**	West Indies	18 July 1988 (aged 30)	Right-handed	Right-arm fast medium	2018	Overseas
29	**Anton Devcich**	New Zealand	28 September 1985 (aged 33)	Left-handed	Slow left-arm orthodox	2018	Overseas
78	**Corey Anderson**	New Zealand	13 December 1990 (aged 28)	Right-handed	Right-arm medium-fast	2019	Overseas
27	**David Wiese**	South Africa	18 May 1985 (aged 33)	Right-handed	Right-arm medium	2019	Overseas
44	Mohammad Imran	Pakistan	25 December 1996 (aged 22)	Right-handed	Right-arm medium-fast	2019	
14	**Asela Gunaratne**	Sri Lanka	8 January 1986 (aged 33)	Right-handed	Right-arm medium	2019	Overseas
	**Ryan ten Doeschate**	Netherlands	30 June 1980 (aged 38)	Right-handed	Right-arm medium-fast	2019	Overseas
Wicket-keepers
05	Gauhar Ali	Pakistan	5 May 1989 (aged 29)	Right-handed	—	2019	
01	**Brendan Taylor**	Zimbabwe	6 February 1987 (aged 32)	Right-handed	Right-arm off-break	2019	Overseas
	Umair Masood	Pakistan	7 December 1997 (aged 21)	Right-handed	—	2019	
	Riki Wessels	England	12 November 1985 (aged 33)	Right-handed	—	2019	Overseas
Bowlers
7	**Hardus Viljoen**	South Africa	6 March 1989 (aged 29)	Right-handed	Right-arm fast	2019	Overseas
10	**Shaheen Afridi**	Pakistan	6 April 2000 (aged 18)	Left-handed	Left-arm fast	2019	
86	**Yasir Shah**	Pakistan	2 May 1986 (aged 32)	Right-handed	Right-arm leg break	2019	
21	**Rahat Ali**	Pakistan	12 September 1988 (aged 30)	Right-handed	Left-arm fast-medium	2019	
25	**Sandeep Lamichhane**	Nepal	2 August 2000 (aged 18)	Right-handed	Right-arm leg-break, googly	2019	Overseas
74	**Aizaz Cheema**	Pakistan	5 September 1979 (aged 39)	Right-handed	Right-arm medium-fast	2019	
150	Haris Rauf	Pakistan	7 November 1993 (aged 25)	Right-handed	Right-arm fast	2019	

== Kit manufacturers and sponsors ==
Kit manufacturer	Shirt sponsor (chest)	Shirt sponsor (back)	Chest branding	Sleeve branding
Millat Sports	Ecostar	Mughal Steel	Geo News	QALCO, Lays

Playing kit

== Season standings ==
=== Points table ===
Pos	Team	Pld	W	L	T	NR	Pts	NRR
1	Peshawar Zalmi (R)	10	7	3	0	0	14	0.828
2	Quetta Gladiators (C)	10	7	3	0	0	14	0.376
3	Islamabad United (3rd)	10	5	5	0	0	10	0.127
4	Karachi Kings (4th)	10	5	5	0	0	10	−0.673
5	Multan Sultans	10	3	7	0	0	6	0.173
6	Lahore Qalandars	10	3	7	0	0	6	−0.837

Source: ESPNcricinfo
- The top 4 teams qualified for the playoffs
- Advanced to Qualifier
- Advanced to Eliminator 1

Notes:

- C = Champions;
- R = Runner-up;
- (x) = Position at the end of the tournament;
