= TCS (logistics company) =

Pakistani courier and logistics company

- Type: Private
- Industry: Logistics
- Founded: May 1983; 43 years ago
- Founder: Khalid Nawaz Awan; Sadiq Awan
- Headquarters: Karachi, Pakistan
- Area served: Worldwide
- Key people: Moin Ahmed Malik (CEO)
- Revenue: ▲PKR 30.7 billion (2021)
- Number of employees: 12,000+
- Website: tcsexpress.com

Tranzum Courier Service (TCS) is a Pakistani courier and logistics company based in Karachi. It was founded as a joint venture with DHL by a former Pakistan International Airlines (PIA) flight engineer, Khalid Nawaz Awan and his brother Sadiq Awan in 1983.

== History ==
TCS was founded in 1983 by Khalid Awan and his elder brother Sadiq Awan, as a joint venture with DHL. Before joining TCS, Khalid Awan worked as a flight engineer with Pakistan International Airlines.

In its early years, TCS faced regulatory challenges under the 1898 Post Office Act, which limited the delivery of "letters" to the national post office. TCS contended that its services included "business-related documents" and international packages, leading to a joint venture arrangement where DHL owned 51% of the international delivery operations, and TCS retained full ownership of local operations.

In 1985, TCS secured a contract with the Pakistan Banking Council to provide overnight delivery services connecting 4,000 bank branches nationwide. In 1991, to address succession planning, the Awan brothers divided the business, with Sadiq taking control of the international operations and Khalid managing the domestic services. Throughout the 1990s and 2000s, TCS underwent several management changes, including the departure and later return of Jamil Janjua, who was CEO before Khalid Awan assumed the role of chairman.

In 2014, M. A. Mannan, a banker by profession, was appointed as CEO of TCS. During his tenure, TCS introduced two new business lines: TCS Hazir, a one-hour delivery service, and Yayvo, an e-commerce platform aimed to compete with Daraz.pk. He also negotiated with lenders to remove personal guarantees from company loans and utilized TCS's relatively low existing debt to fund these new ventures and higher operational costs. Between 2014 and 2018, these initiatives involved approximately Rs. 800 million in capital expenditures. Initially, Yayvo grew to become second-largest e-commerce platform in Pakistan, and TCS Hazir showed early promise. However, the strategy brought challenges. The recruitment of former bankers, who lacked logistics experience, contributed to a shift in company culture and operational issues. While the introduction of TCS Hazir led to delays in package delivery and increased operational costs. The company faced cash flow issues and began using cash collected on behalf of vendors for its own expenditures, which delayed payments to those vendors.

By 2017, disagreements over management strategies between Mannan and TCS founder Khalid Awan became apparent. Awan, along with his daughter Saira who joined the company's management, began to reassert family control over the business. Despite growing revenues, which reached Rs 14.5 billion, the financial stability of the company was compromised, with receivables from Yayvo reaching Rs 1.8 billion. In 2018, Mannan secured a potential buyer, Ijarah Capital, but during a key management meeting where the sale was expected to be finalized, Khalid Awan announced the termination of Mannan's role, influenced by his family's opposition to the sale. Later, his daughter, Saira Awan was appointed as the CEO.

== Operations ==
TCS maintains several thousand locations within Pakistan and worldwide as well as delivery vehicles and couriers. TCS has been assigned machine readable passports (MRPs) delivery services by the government, and Visa application submission and delivery services by embassies.

== Air fleet ==
Aircraft	In service	Note
Boeing 737-400SF	1	

== Yayvo ==
Yayvo, also known as TCS Connect, was a Pakistani online retailer which operated as a subsidiary of TCS. It was founded in 2012. In September 2022, TCS announced that it was shutting down Yayvo.com after approximately eight years of operations. The company cited continued financial losses, with TCS recording an impairment loss of about Rs 1.2 billion linked to the business.
