= Schön Properties =

Real estate developer in Dubai, United Arab Emirates

- Type: Private company
- Industry: Real estate
- Founded: 1971; 55 years ago
- Founder: Schon family
- Defunct: 2024; 2 years ago
- Fate: Unknown
- Headquarters: Dubai, United Arab Emirates
- Area served: Dubai
- Products: Real estate development
- Owner: Schon family
- Website: www.schonproperties.ae Archived

Schön Properties was a Dubai-based real estate developer owned by the Schon family, which originated in Pakistan. The company had been involved in several development projects in Dubai, including the Schon Business Park project and Dubai Lagoons in Dubai Investments Park, which was started in 2005, but was hit hard by the 2008 financial crisis. In 2015, the company delivered a 1.6 million square feet project called Schon Business Park, consisting of 72 retail outlets and 304 offices.

In August 2018, Dubai Land Department seized assets of Schon properties alleging that the company had exploited its investors. As of 2024, the company's website was no longer active.

== History ==
The company was founded in 1971 in Singapore by the Schon family, which originated in Pakistan.

In February 2017, Xanadu acquired Dubai Lagoon from Schon Properties for an undisclosed sum. The new developer Xanadu took over the project and purchased it with all its assets and liabilities, including the customers of Dubai Lagoon

In August 2018, the Dubai agency cancelled two of Schon's projects, iSuites Smart Residences and Ava Residences. In August 2019, Schon Properties signed an agreement with its investors to complete Dubai Lagoon Lotus project. The housing project comprises 442 units and is 500,000 square feet.

In March 2022, it was reported that properties from the Dubai Lagoon project had been given to different developers in order to complete the development.

=== Pakistan Super League 2017 ===
In June 2017, the company purchased the Multan Sultans cricket franchise of the Twenty20 Pakistan Super League for US$5.2 million per year for eight years, replacing Karachi Kings as the most expensive team in the league. That month it also launched another project in the investment park called iSuites, in a joint venture with the Al Hamad Group.

In November 2018, Pakistan Cricket Board (PCB) along with Schon Properties mutually ended the eight-year ownership rights of Multan Sultans. A joint statement issued by Schon Properties and the PCB said that all rights in respect to the team have returned to the board.

== Controversy ==
In August of 2018 Dubai Land Department seized assets of Schon properties alleging that the company had exploited its investors. The agency also directed its investors to make payments into escrow accounts, in order to protect investors while the agency prepared to bring legal proceedings against the company.
