= Mohammad Hasnain =

Pakistani cricketer (born 2000)

Personal information
- Born: 5 April 2000 (age 26); Hyderabad, Sindh, Pakistan
- Height: 6 ft 1 in (185 cm)
- Batting: Right-handed
- Bowling: Right-arm fast
- Role: Bowler

International information
- National side: Pakistan (2019–present)
- ODI debut (cap 222): 24 March 2019 v Australia
- Last ODI: 12 February 2025 v South Africa
- T20I debut (cap 82): 5 May 2019 v England
- Last T20I: 5 December 2024 v Zimbabwe

Domestic team information
- Years: Team
- 2018/19: Pakistan Television
- 2019–2024: Quetta Gladiators
- 2019: Trinbago Knight Riders
- 2019/20–2022/23: Sindh cricket team
- 2021/22–2024/25: Sydney Thunder
- 2022: Worcestershire County Cricket Club
- 2022: Oval Invincibles
- 2023–2024: Kandy Falcons
- 2025: Multan Sultans
- 2026: Islamabad United

Career statistics
Competition	ODI	T20I	FC	LA
Matches	15	28	7	42
Runs scored	53	24	16	110
Batting average	17.66	24.00	2.00	9.16
100s/50s	0/0	0/0	0/0	0/0
Top score	28	8*	5	28
Balls bowled	718	618	1,050	2,054
Wickets	17	25	12	74
Bowling average	44.41	35.08	49.16	27.10
5 wickets in innings	1	0	0	3
10 wickets in match	0	0	0	0
Best bowling	5/26	3/37	3/74	6/19
Catches/stumpings	3/–	1/–	1/–	5/–
- Source: ESPNcricinfo, 15 March 2025

Mohammad Hasnain (born 5 April 2000) is a Pakistani cricketer who has played for the Pakistan cricket team since 2019. He is currently one of the fastest bowlers in world cricket, timed at over 150kmh.

== Early life ==
Hasnain was born in a family of six tracing its roots back to the city of Alwar in the Indian state of Rajasthan, and his father, Mohammad Hussain, who owns a cattle feed shop in Hirabad, Hyderabad, was himself a cricketer (a wicket keeper and then fast bowler) who had to abandon the sport to support his large family.

== Domestic career ==
He made his first-class debut for Pakistan Television in the 2018–19 Quaid-e-Azam Trophy on 1 September 2018. He made his Twenty20 debut for the Quetta Gladiators in the 2019 Pakistan Super League (PSL) on 27 February 2019. He was eventually noted for his pace and accuracy, also bowling the fastest delivery of the tournament, at 151 km/h. He is the first quick bowler to come from Hyderabad in Pakistan. For his bowling figures of 3/30 off 4 overs, he was declared man-of-the match during the PSL final against Peshawar Zalmi, also the first local to get that award in a PSL final.

In March 2019, he was named in Sindh's squad for the 2019 Pakistan Cup. In September 2019, he was named in Sindh's squad for the 2019–20 Quaid-e-Azam Trophy tournament.

In September 2019, while playing for the Trinbago Knight Riders in the Caribbean Premier League (CPL) he was clocked in at 155.1 km/h, making it the fastest ball ever bowled in the CPL.

In January 2022, he made his debut for the Sydney Thunder in Australia's Big Bash League (BBL), taking 3 wickets for 0 runs in his first over.

On 15 January 2022, his bowling action was reported in a match against the Sydney Sixers. Moises Henriques had questioned his action on field. He was then recalled to Pakistan where he underwent testing in Lahore and was found to have an illegal action, he was banned from bowling until it was rectified. He would later be cleared to return to play on 9 June 2022, after lowering his elbow flex from 17 to 24% to 12-13%.

In June 2022, he was signed by Worcestershire to play in the County Championship in England.

== International career ==
In March 2019, he was named in Pakistan's One Day International (ODI) squad for their series against Australia. He made his ODI debut for Pakistan against Australia on 24 March 2019.

In April 2019, he was named in Pakistan's squad for the 2019 Cricket World Cup. He made his Twenty20 International (T20I) debut for Pakistan against England on 5 May 2019. On 5 October 2019, in the series against Sri Lanka, at the age of 19 years and 183 days, Hasnain became the youngest bowler, the second for Pakistan, and ninth overall, to take a hat-trick in a T20I match.

In November 2019, he was named in Pakistan's squad for the 2019 ACC Emerging Teams Asia Cup in Bangladesh. In May 2020, the Pakistan Cricket Board (PCB) awarded him with a central contract, in a newly created Emerging Players' category, ahead of the 2020–21 season.

In June 2020, he was named in a 29-man squad for Pakistan's tour to England during the COVID-19 pandemic. However, on 23 June 2020, Hasnain was one of seven players from Pakistan's squad to test positive for COVID-19. On 3 November 2020, in the third match against Zimbabwe, he took his first five-wicket haul in ODI cricket, returning figures of 5/26 in 10 overs. In November 2020, he was named in Pakistan's 35-man squad for their tour to New Zealand.

In September 2021, he was named in Pakistan's squad for the 2021 ICC Men's T20 World Cup.

In February 2022, Hasnain was suspended from bowling in international cricket by the International Cricket Council (ICC) due to an illegal bowling action. In June 2022, he was cleared to bowl following assessments on his action.

On 22 August 2022 Hasnain was picked as a replacement for the injured Shaheen Afridi for Asia Cup.
