= Quetta Gladiators =

Quetta-based cricket franchise in the Pakistan Super League

- کوئٹہ گلیڈی ایٹرز
- Nicknames: Shan-e-Pakistan; Purple Force
- League: Pakistan Super League

Personnel
- Captain: Saud Shakeel
- Coach: Moin Khan
- Bowling coach: Sohail Tanvir
- Owner: Nadeem Omar

Team information
- City: Quetta, Balochistan, Pakistan
- Founded: 2015; 11 years ago
- Home ground: Bugti Stadium
- Capacity: 20,000

History
- PSL wins: 1 (2019)
- Official website: www.quettagladiators.com
T20I kit

The Quetta Gladiators (Urdu/Balochi: کوئٹہ گلیڈی ایٹرز) are a professional Twenty20 franchise cricket team competes in the Pakistan Super League (PSL). The team is based in Quetta, the provincial capital of Balochistan, Pakistan, and was established in 2015 with the inception of the league by the Pakistan Cricket Board (PCB).

The franchise is owned by Nadeem Omar of the Omar Associates group. Saud Shakeel is the current captain, while Sarfaraz Ahmed, who captained the team from 2016 to 2023, now serves as the head coach. Moin Khan acts as the team manager and Abdul Razzaq serves as the assistant coach. Viv Richards continues to be the team’s mentor.

Quetta Gladiators won their maiden PSL title in the 2019 season, defeating Peshawar Zalmi in the final. The team plays most of its home matches at the Rawalpindi Cricket Stadium, with Bugti Stadium in Quetta serving as its official home ground.

Sarfaraz Ahmed remains the franchise’s all-time leading run-scorer, while Mohammad Nawaz is the leading wicket-taker.

== Franchise history ==
In December 2015, the Pakistan Cricket Board unveiled the owners of all five city-based franchises for the inaugural season of the Pakistan Super League. The Quetta franchise was sold to the Karachi-based company Omar Associates for US$11 million for a ten-year period.

In November 2025, following the conclusion of the original contract, the franchise renewed its rights for another decade (2026–2035). The renewal was based on a new valuation by Ernst & Young, which shifted the financial model from US dollars to Pakistani Rupees. Under the new agreement, the annual franchise fee for Quetta Gladiators was set at Rs. 340 million.

=== 2016 season: Runners-up ===
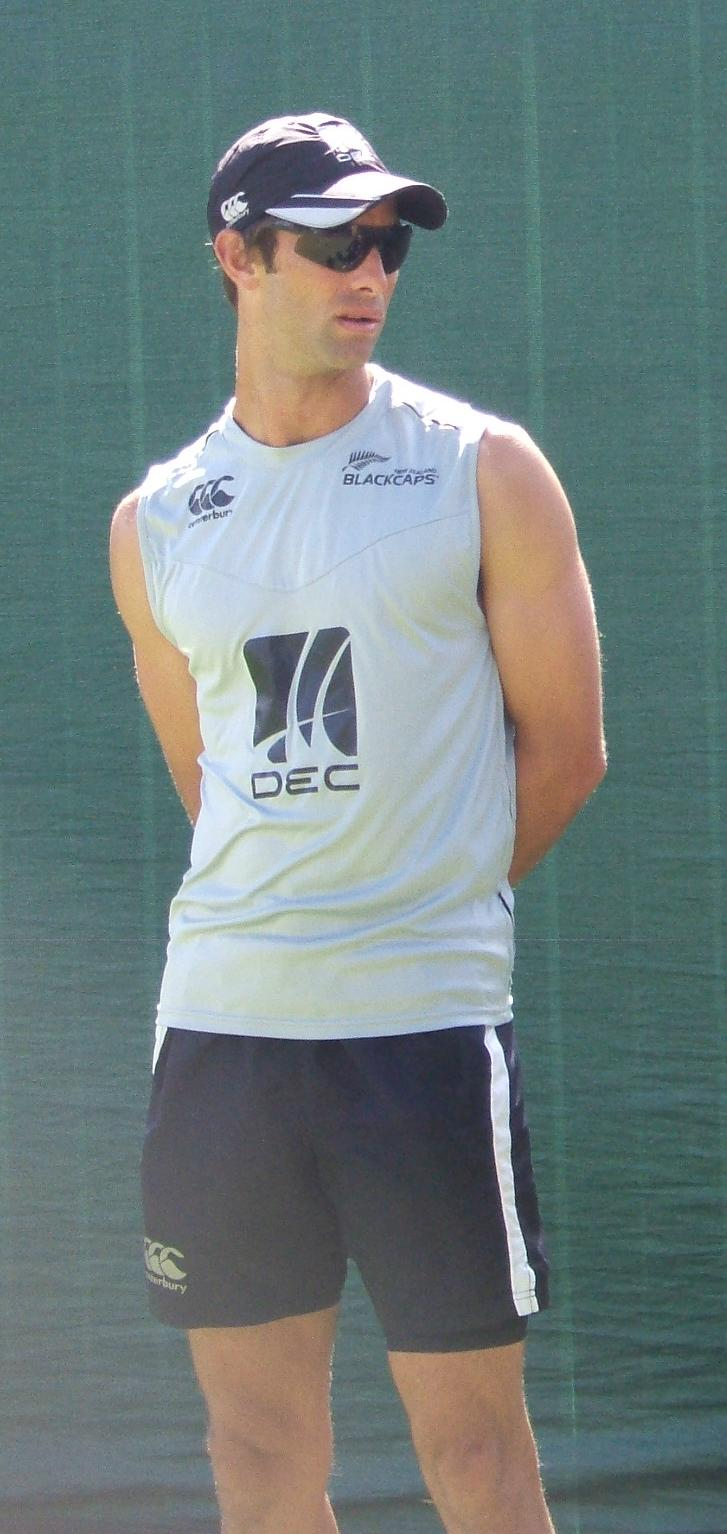
Grant Elliott took 11 wickets in six matches

Quetta Gladiators began their inaugural campaign with strong performances, securing early wins against Islamabad United and Karachi Kings. The arrival of Grant Elliott mid-season bolstered the squad, and a key victory over Karachi confirmed their spot as the first team to reach the playoffs.

The team finished 2nd in the league table, winning six of their eight matches. In the first qualifier, Quetta defeated Peshawar Zalmi by one run in a thriller, with Kevin Pietersen scoring 53 and Kumar Sangakkara 37. This victory propelled them to the final, where they lost to Islamabad United by six wickets despite posting a competitive total of 174. Ahmed Shehzad was the leading run-scorer with 290 runs, while Mohammad Nawaz led the bowling attack with 13 wickets.

=== 2017 season: Runners-up ===
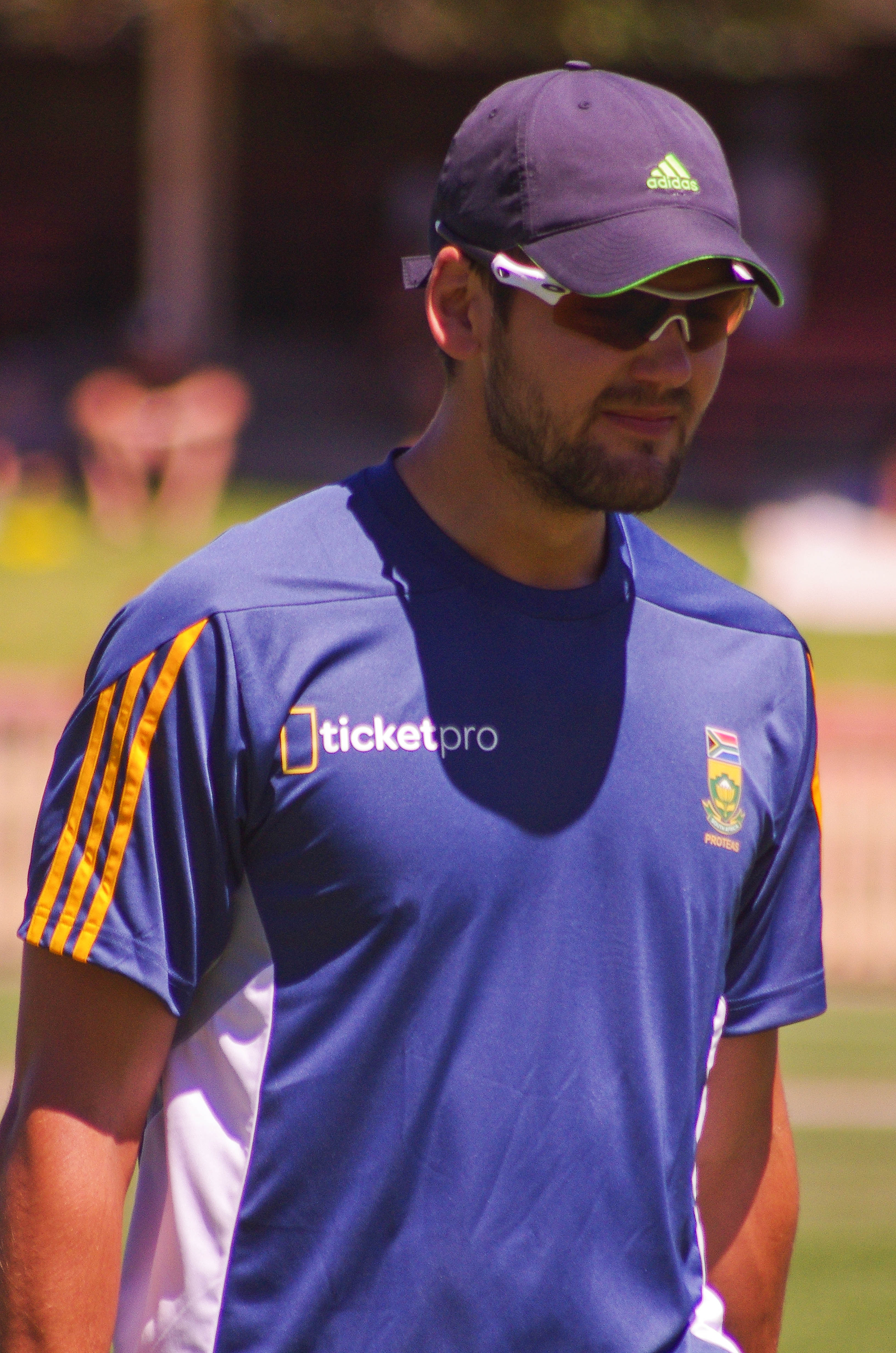
Rilee Rossouw scored 255 runs becoming the leading run-scorer for the team in 2017.

Ahead of the 2017 season, Quetta released Kumar Sangakkara and Grant Elliott, replacing them with foreign signings like Rilee Rossouw, Mahmudullah, and Tymal Mills.

Quetta again performed well in the group stages. They successfully chased 201 runs against Lahore Qalandars, where Kevin Pietersen scored 88 off 42 balls. Despite losing their last two league games, they qualified for the playoffs comfortably. In the first qualifier, they defeated Peshawar Zalmi by just 1 run after setting a target of 201, securing a direct spot in the final.

However, the team faced a major setback before the final in Lahore as key foreign players, including Pietersen and Rossouw, refused to travel due to security concerns. Fielding a depleted team, Quetta was bowled out for 90 runs chasing 148, losing the final to Peshawar Zalmi by 58 runs.

=== 2018 season ===
In their opening game of the 2018 season, the Gladiators blemished their 100% success rate against Karachi Kings and lost to them for the first time - by 19 runs in the chase of 150. But in the next match, the Gladiators rebounded with an emphatic 9-wicket-win over Lahore Qalandars. This was their biggest win in terms of wicket margin, as they chased down Qalandar's target of 120 runs in 14 overs.

As the league stage shifted to Sharjah, the Gladiators beat Islamabad United by 6 wickets in the successful chase of a 135-run target. Kevin Pietersen anchored the innings with his contribution of 48 runs. The following match, however, the team lost a thriller against rivals Peshawer Zalmi. Batting first, the Gladiators set a target of 143 runs in a batting display that was punctuated with starts and stops on a two-paced pitch. In reply, the Zalmis were on course for victory at 107-2 before losing three quick wickets to end up requiring 22 runs from the last two overs. At this point, an injured Darren Sammy single-handedly won the match for his team by striking 16 runs from 4 balls to finish the game with 2 balls to go. The Gladiators were comprehensively beaten in the next game by Multan Sultans. Batting first, the team could only muster 102 runs on the board as they suffered a major batting collapse - losing their last 5 wickets for a solitary run. In reply, the Sultans chased down the target with 9 wickets to spare.

As the tournament shifted back to Dubai, the Gladiators experienced a change in fortune. The team won by 2 wickets in a closely fought contest against Multan Sultans. Chasing a target of 153 runs, they lost wickets at regular intervals before cameos from the lower order ensured that the team won off a penultimate-ball six hit by Hasan Khan. The Gladiators continued with their winning streak as they beat Karachi Kings and Peshawer Zalmi in the next two games. Against the Kings, the Gladiators set a target of 181 runs - their highest total of the season. It was built upon strong batting performances by Shane Watson, who scored 90*(58) - the highest individual score in this edition of the PSL - and Kevin Pietersen, who scored 52(34). In reply, the Kings suffered regular wicket losses that culminated in a 67-run loss. Against, the Zalmis, Quetta chased down a target 158 runs in the final over with 6 wickets in hand. The chase was guided by an unbroken 74-runs partnership between Rilee Rossouw and captain, Sarfraz Ahmad.

=== 2019 season: Champions ===
Gladiators finished the group stage in the second position by winning seven of their matches and losing three. They then defeated Peshawar Zalmi in the qualifier by 10 runs.

In the final in Karachi, the Gladiators defeated Peshawar Zalmi by 8 wickets to win their first title. Gladiators' Mohammad Hasnain was awarded the man of the match award.

=== 2020 season ===
The team started their season with a win over Islamabad United by 3 wickets in the opening game of the season. In their second match, team lost to Peshawar Zalmi by six wickets. The team won their next two matches against Karachi Kings and Islamabad United respectively, both by five wickets. Quetta then went on a losing streak, facing defeat in their next four matches. Their ninth match was abandoned due to rain. In their last match of the group stage, Quetta defeated Kings by 5 wickets, equaling points with Peshawar Zalmi but failed to qualify for the play-offs for the first time in team's history, due to low run-rate. In the end, they finished in the fifth position at league's table.

=== 2023 season ===
The Quetta Gladiators finished the 2023 season in the last position (6th) on the league table, winning only three out of their ten matches and failing to qualify for the play-offs for the fourth consecutive year.

The team's campaign featured a historic match against Peshawar Zalmi in Rawalpindi. After Zalmi posted a total of 240/2, driven by a century from Babar Azam (115 runs), the Gladiators completed the highest successful run-chase in PSL history, scoring 243/2 with ten balls remaining. This record victory was secured by Jason Roy, who hit an unbeaten 145 runs off 63 balls.

=== 2024 season ===
Quetta Gladiators lost their first match against Peshawar Zalmi. However they made it to the semi-finals, but unfortunately Islamabad United beat Quetta.

== Team identity ==
The team name and the official logo were revealed on 6 January 2016 in Quetta during a ceremony held by team owner Nadeem Omar. The logo depicts a variant of the ancient Roman 'Galea' helmet, worn by gladiators during their fights. The helmet is flanked by two bats that are poised as gladiatorial swords. The team's primary kit colours are purple and golden. The kit was revealed on 7 January 2016 in a launch ceremony held in Quetta.

The team's chant is Kai Kai Quetta, which is taken from the war cry, Kai Kai, coined by the Baloch Regiment during World War II. It literally translates to 'we are coming'.

=== Anthems ===
- 2016 PSL: "Chaa Jaye Quetta" - Faakhir Mehmood and Faheem Allan Fakir
- 2017 PSL: "Chah Gaya Quetta" - Faakhir Mehmood featuring Sarfaraz Ahmed
- 2018 PSL: "Agae Shaan Se Hum" - Zordaar11 featuring Faakhir Mehmood and Aima Baig
- 2019 PSL: "We The Gladiators" - Dwayne Bravo / "Quetta Gladiator Anthem 2019" - Bayaan
- 2020 PSL: "Shaan-e-Pakistan Hain Hum" - Harris Jalil Mir and Hasan Bin Hisam
- 2021 PSL: "Aar Ya Paar" - Raamis
- 2022 PSL: "Shaan-e-Pakistan" - Bilal Maqsood featuring Ahmed Murtaza
- 2023 PSL: "We're The Champions" - Dwayne Bravo

=== Ambassadors ===
Before the start of the 2017 season, team's official mascot named "Gladdy" was revealed, making Quetta Gladiators the first team to officially introduce a mascot for the tournament.

In early 2017, Quetta chose pop singer Annie Khalid as their team ambassador. Other notables joining Quetta in ambassadorial roles are Chaman-based footballer Kaleemullah and Quetta-based MMA fighter Ahmed Mujtaba. They were joined by Maya Ali and Faakhir Mehmood as team's brand ambassadors in 2018. Only Maya Ali continued her role in 2019 and 2020. She remained the ambassador in 2021 as well, when she was joined by actor Bilal Ashraf, who was recruited in 2020.

On 23 January 2022, Quetta unveiled the music video of its official anthem for the seventh edition of PSL, which featured actors Adnan Siddiqui and Ushna Shah, and comedian Syed Shafaat Ali.

=== Sponsors ===
For the season 2016, Edenrobe and ACM Gold were the team's title sponsor and official partners respectively. For the second season, Jubilee Insurance became Quetta's main title sponsor. Master Oil became the team's associate sponsor and Chocka and KHL were team's official partners. PTV Sports and Suno FM 89.4 were official media partners, while Tapmad was the team's official streaming partner.

Year	Kit manufacturer	Shirt sponsor (front)	Shirt sponsor (back)	Chest branding	Sleeve branding
2016	AJ Sports	Edenrobe	ACM Gold		PTV Sports, Zong
2017	AJ Sports	Jubilee Insurance	Omar Associates	Master Oil	PTV Sports
2018	AJ Sports	Engro	Olpers	Master Oil	Engro Foods
2019	AJ Sports	Engro	Olpers	Master Oil	Engro Foods
2020	AJ Sports	Engro	Engro	Master Oil	KFC, Ignite, ﺟﻨﮓ
2021	AJ Sports	BRB Group	Lotte Choco Pie	BRB Group	KFC, Soneri Bank, Berocca
2022	AJ Sports	BRB Group	Meiji	BRB Group	Hemani, Soneri Bank, KFC
2023	AJ Sports	BJ Sports	MCW Sports	F&A Global	Domino's
2024	AJ Sports	Kingsmen Enterprise	Ziewnic	TCL	Stile, United Bank Limited
2025	AJ Sports	HMR Group Groups	DHA Quetta	Ziewnic	United Bank Limited, Stile, Imtiaz

== Current squad ==
Key
- Players with international caps are listed in **bold**.
- * denotes a player who is fully unavailable
- * denotes a player who will be partially unavailable

No.	Name	Nationality	Birth date	Salary	Batting style	Bowling style	Year signed	Notes
Batsmen
14	**Hassan Nawaz**	Pakistan	21 August 2002 (age 24)	PKR 3.92 crore	Right-handed	Right-arm off break	2025	
18	**Shamyl Hussain**	Pakistan	10 October 2004 (age 22)	PKR 84 lakh	Left-handed	—	2026	
32	**Rilee Rossouw**	South Africa	9 October 1989 (age 37)	PKR 5.50 crore	Left-handed	Right-arm off break	2026	
70	**Bevon Jacobs**	New Zealand	6 May 2002 (age 24)	PKR 60 lakh	Right-handed	Right-arm medium	2026	
59	**Saud Shakeel**	Pakistan	5 September 1995 (age 31)	PKR 65 lakh	Left-handed	Slow left arm orthodox	2026	Captain
47	**Ben McDermott**	Australia	12 December 1994 (age 31)	PKR 1.10 crore	Right-handed	Right-arm medium	2026	
53	Jahanzaib Sultan	Pakistan	3 May 2002 (age 24)	PKR 60 lakh	Left-handed	Right-arm off break	2026	
23	**Ahsan Ali**	Pakistan	10 December 1993 (age 32)	PKR	Right-handed	Right-arm leg break	2026	Partial Replacement
Wicket-keepers
999	**Khawaja Nafay**	Pakistan	13 February 2002 (age 24)	PKR 6.50 crore	Right-handed	—	2026	
44	Bismillah Khan	Pakistan	1 March 1990 (age 36)	PKR 60 lakh	Right-handed	—	2026	
6	Sam Harper	Australia	10 December 1996 (age 29)	PKR 60 lakh	Right-handed	—	2026	
All-rounders
58	**Jahandad Khan**	Pakistan	16 June 2003 (age 23)	PKR 2.50 crore	Left-handed	Left-arm fast-medium	2026	
30	Brett Hampton	New Zealand	30 April 1991 (age 35)	PKR 60 lakh	Right-handed	Right-arm medium	2026	
59	**Tom Curran**	England	12 March 1995 (age 31)	PKR 4.20 crore	Right-handed	Right-arm medium	2026	
65	Kashif Bhatti	Pakistan	25 July 1986 (age 40)	PKR 60 lakh	Right-handed	Slow left-arm orthodox	2026	
Bowlers
00	**Usman Tariq**	Pakistan	7 June 1995 (age 31)	PKR 5.6 crore	Right-handed	Right-arm off break	2024	
40	**Abrar Ahmed**	Pakistan	16 October 1998 (age 28)	PKR 7.0 crore	Right-handed	Right-arm leg break	2024	
14	Waseem Akram Jr	Pakistan	1 June 2002 (age 24)	PKR 60 lakh	Right-handed	Right-arm fast-medium	2026	
18	Khan Zeb	Pakistan	N/A	PKR 60 lakh	Right-handed	Right-arm fast-medium	2026	
33	**Ahmed Daniyal**	Pakistan	4 August 1997 (age 29)	PKR 2.24 crore	Right-handed	Right-arm fast-medium	2026	
8	**Alzarri Joseph**	West Indies	20 November 1996 (age 29)	PKR 5.60 crore	Right-handed	Right-arm fast	2026	

- Source: Cricinfo

== Management and coaching staff ==
Position	Name
Mentor	Viv Richards
Team Director	Sarfaraz Ahmed
Head coach	Moin Khan
Assistant Coach	Iqbal Imam
Bowling Coach	Sohail Tanvir

== Captains ==
Name	From	To	Mat	Won	Lost	Tie	NR	%
Sarfaraz Ahmed	2016	2023	133	38	104	0	1	48.10
Mohammad Nawaz	2023	2023	2	1	1	0	0	50.00
Rilee Rossouw	2024	2024	10	5	5	0	0	50.00
Saud Shakeel	2025	present	10	7	2	0	1	70.00

Source: ESPNcricinfo, Last updated: 15 March 2024

== Result summary ==
=== Overall result in PSL ===
Year	Pld	Won	Lost	Tie	NR	SR (%)	Position	Summary
2016	10	7	3	0	0	70.00	2/5	Runners-up
2017	10	5	5	0	0	50.00	2/5	Runners-up
2018	11	5	6	0	0	45.45	4/6	Play-offs
2019	12	9	3	0	0	75.00	2/6	Champions
2020	10	4	5	0	1	44.44	5/6	League Stage
2021	10	2	8	0	0	20.00	6/6	League Stage
2022	10	4	6	0	0	40.00	5/6	League Stage
2023	10	3	7	0	0	30.00	6/6	League Stage
2024	11	5	5	0	1	50.00	4/6	Play-offs
2025	12	8	3	0	1	72.72	1/6	Runners-up
Total	106	52	51	0	3	50.48	1 Title	

Source: Based on official standings from 2016 to 2025.

=== Performance Visuals ===
League Position by Season
1st										
2nd										
4th										
6th										
	'16	'17	'18	'19	'20	'21	'22	'23	'24	'25

Win/Loss Ratio (All Seasons)
■ Wins	50.5%
■ Losses	46.7%
■ N/R	2.8%

=== Head-to-head record ===
Opposition	Span	Mat	Won	Lost	Tie+W	Tie+L	NR	SR (%)
Islamabad United	2016–2025	22	12	10	0	0	0	54.54
Karachi Kings	2016–2025	20	13	7	0	0	0	65.00
Lahore Qalandars	2016–2025	21	9	11	0	0	1	45.00
Multan Sultans	2018–2025	15	6	9	0	0	0	40.00
Peshawar Zalmi	2016–2025	26	12	13	0	0	1	48.00

QG Success vs Opponents (2025)
12:10	13:7	9:11	6:9	12:13
IU	KK	LQ	MS	PZ

Key: ■ QG Won | ■ IU | ■ KK | ■ LQ | ■ MS | ■ PZ
Source: ESPNcricinfo, Last updated: 23 February 2026

== Statistics ==
As of 15 March 2024

=== Most runs ===
Player	Years	Innings	Runs	High score
Sarfaraz Ahmed	2016–2024	73	1,525	81
Jason Roy	2018; 2020; 2022–2024	33	1,087	145*
Shane Watson	2018–2020	31	996	91*
Ahmed Shehzad	2016–2017; 2019–2020	34	904	99
Rilee Rossouw	2017–2019; 2024–present	39	898	76*

- Source: ESPNcricinfo

=== Most wickets ===
Player	Years	Innings	Wickets	Best bowling
Mohammad Nawaz	2016–2023	76	70	4/13
Mohammad Hasnain	2019–2024	39	51	4/25
Naseem Shah	2020–2023	29	26	5/20
Anwar Ali	2016–2021	34	23	2/21
Sohail Tanvir	2019; 2022	19	17	4/21

- Source: ESPNcricinfo
