= Nabi Gul =

Pakistani cricketer (born 1997)

Personal information
- Born: 1 March 1998 (age 28); Nowshera, Khyber Pakhtunkhwa, Pakistan
- Batting: Right-handed

Domestic team information
- Years: Team
- 2019: Peshawar Zalmi
- Source: Cricinfo, 17 April 2017

Nabi Gul (born 1 March 1998) is a Pakistani cricketer. He made his List A debut for Khyber Pakhtunkhwa in the 2017 Pakistan Cup on 17 April 2017. He made his Twenty20 debut for Federally Administered Tribal Areas in the 2017–18 National T20 Cup on 22 November 2017. He made his first-class debut for Peshawar in the 2018–19 Quaid-e-Azam Trophy on 11 October 2018.

In September 2019, he was named in Khyber Pakhtunkhwa's squad for the 2019–20 Quaid-e-Azam Trophy tournament.
