= Islamabad United =

Islamabad-based cricket franchise in the Pakistan Super League

- اسلام آباد یونائیٹڈ
- Nicknames: ISLU; Sherus
- League: Pakistan Super League

Personnel
- Captain: Shadab Khan
- Coach: Luke Ronchi
- Batting coach: Ashley Wright
- Bowling coach: Ian Butler
- Owner: Leonine Global Sports
- Manager: Rehan Ul Haq

Team information
- City: Islamabad, Pakistan
- Founded: 2015; 11 years ago
- Home ground: Rawalpindi Cricket Stadium; Islamabad Cricket Stadium (planned)
- Capacity: 15,000

History
- PSL wins: 3 (2016, 2018, 2024)
- Official website: isbunited.com
Home kit
Away kit
Breast cancer awareness kit

Islamabad United (Urdu: اسلام‌آباد یونائیٹڈ) is a professional Twenty20 franchise cricket team that competes in the Pakistan Super League (PSL). The team is based in Islamabad, the capital city of Pakistan, and was established in 2015 to compete in the league's inaugural season in 2016.

The franchise is owned by Leonine Global Investments through its sports arm, Leonine Global Sports, led by Amna Naqvi and Ali Naqvi. Islamabad United won the inaugural PSL title by defeating Quetta Gladiators in the final, and claimed their second championship in the 2018 season after beating Peshawar Zalmi. The team secured its third title in the 2024 season, overcoming Multan Sultans in a thrilling final. With three titles, United is the most successful franchise in PSL history.

The team's home ground is the Rawalpindi Cricket Stadium with a seating capacity of 15,000. Luke Ronchi serves as the head coach, having succeeded Mike Hesson.

Shadab Khan has captained the team since 2020, becoming the youngest captain in PSL history at the time of his appointment.

The team's leading run-scorer is Colin Munro, while Shadab Khan remains the franchise's all-time leading wicket-taker.

== Franchise history ==
In 2015, the Pakistan Cricket Board (PCB) announced that the inaugural season of the Pakistan Super League would take place in February 2016 in the United Arab Emirates. On 3 December 2015, the PCB unveiled the owners of five city-based franchises. The Islamabad franchise was sold to Leonine Global Sports for US$15 million for a ten-year period.

In November 2025, following the conclusion of the original contract, the franchise renewed its rights for another decade (2026–2035). The renewal followed a league-wide valuation by Ernst & Young, which shifted the financial model from US dollars to Pakistani Rupees. Under the new agreement, the annual franchise fee for Islamabad United was set at Rs. 480 million.

=== 2016 season: Champions ===
Islamabad United
2016 season
- Coach: Dean Jones
- Captain: Misbah ul Haq
- PSL 2016: Champions
- Most runs: Sharjeel Khan (299)
- Most wickets: Andre Russell (16)

After a poor start to the 2016 Pakistan Super League, Islamabad United finished third in the round robin group stage, qualifying for the knock out stage of the tournament. The team won four matches out of eight, finishing with eight points from their group games.

They faced fourth-placed Karachi Kings in the eliminator, winning by nine wickets thanks to Mohammad Sami's man of the match performance of five wickets for eight runs from four overs. Brad Haddin and Dwayne Smith each scored fifties as United achieved their target of 111 in the 15th over.

In the second qualifier match Islamabad met Peshawar Zalmi. Sharjeel Khan scored 117 from 62 balls, the first century scored in the Pakistan Super League. It proved to be the difference between the teams as United posted 176 for three and Zalmi were bowled out for 126 with two full overs remaining. United spinner Imran Khalid took four wickets for 20 runs and Andre Russell three for 37. The win took United through to the final against Quetta Gladiators.

The 2016 Pakistan Super League Final was won by Islamabad by six wickets. United opted to bowl first after winning the toss and the Gladiators scored 174–7 in their 20 overs. Andre Russell, who finished the tournament as the leading wicket-taker, took three for 37. In reply United started well with Dwayne Smith scoring 73 runs and Brad Haddin an unbeaten 61, helping United to 174 for four with eight balls remaining and winning the title.

=== 2017 season ===
Islamabad United
2017 season
- Coach: Dean Jones
- Captain: Misbah ul Haq
- PSL 2017: Eliminator
- Most runs: Dwayne Smith (274)
- Most wickets: Rumman Raees (18)

In the 2017 Pakistan Super League players draft, United retained 17 players from their previous squad. The team picked Ben Duckett, Zohaib Khan and Shadab Khan to complete their 20 men squad. Later Steven Finn replaced Andre Russell after he was banned for a year for doping breach. Ben Duckett was replaced by Nicholas Pooran after Duckett left the squad ahead of play-offs due to national duties.

Islamabad United played the inaugural game of the 2017 season against Peshawar Zalmi, which they managed to win by seven wickets and thus continuing their winning streak from last season. In the following game, however, they lost to Lahore Qalandars by six wickets after posting 158 on the board. Misbah top-scored for United through his unbeaten innings of 61 off 36 balls that included five sixes.

As the tournament shifted to Sharjah, United continued to rebuild their campaign by handing Quetta Gladiators their first loss of the season. Chasing 149, they managed to do so at a loss of five wickets with 5-balls to spare. Sam Billings was the top-scorer with his aggressive knock of 78 from 50 balls. But in the following game against table-bottoms, Karachi Kings, United lost by 8-runs through the Duckworth-Lewis method. This came about after they posted 90 runs in their allotted 13 overs in a rain-marred game that was abandoned after 9.4 overs in the second innings. However, continuing on, United won a thrilling last-ball win against Peshawar Zalmi. Dwayne Smith was instrumental in his team's chase of 137 runs as he scored 72 off 59 balls after United's bowlers had earlier restricted the opposition to a below-par score. Following this victory, however, the team lost to Lahore Qalandars by one wicket in a tense game. Batting first, United had difficulties in building their innings and were at one time 83–6. However, the team's emerging player, Shadab Khan, scored 42 off 24 balls to get United to a respectable total of 145 which almost proved match-winning.

With the tournament moving back to Dubai, United registered a thrilling win against Quetta Gladiators. After putting up a total of 166, the team was staring at almost certain defeat after the Gladiators were 148 for the loss of just one wicket at the 16th over. However, after a flurry of wickets and the inability of the opposition batsmen to finish the game, United prevailed by one run. This win also ensured the team of a play-off spot.

Just like last year, Islamabad again faced Karachi in the eliminator. In what proved to be a thrilling game, Karachi, batting first, scored a measly 126 getting all out in the process. Islamabad was set to win and qualify for the second play off. However, that was not the case as the second innings proved. The Karachi bowlers outshone the Islamabad batsmen with Mohammad Amir, Imad Wasim and Usama Mir each picking up three wickets. Islamabad were all out for a mere 82 runs, their lowest in the tournament and the then second-lowest in the tournament's history. Hence, the defending champions were knocked out.

=== 2018 season : Champions ===
Islamabad United
2018 season
- Coach: Dean Jones
- Captain: Misbah ul Haq
- PSL 2018: Champions
- Most runs: Luke Ronchi (435)
- Most wickets: Faheem Ashraf (18)

United started their 2018 season with a loss to Peshawar Zalmi. Chasing a target of 176, the team was reduced to 25-4 inside the powerplay before falling short by 34 runs in their allotted overs. The team rebounded in the next game, against Multan Sultans, by winning it with five wickets spare. Hussain Talat's unbeaten innings of 48 runs was instrumental in United's chase of 114 in difficult batting conditions.

As the league stage shifted to Sharjah, the team lost to Quetta Gladiators by six wickets as they failed to defend the 135-run target. United's key player and vice-captain, Rumman Raees, suffered a knee injuring during the match that has put his availability for the rest of the season in jeopardy. However, the next game, the team bounced back and won a thriller against Lahore Qalandars. The match went down to the Super Over as United managed to restrict the Qalandars to a level score of 121 during the initial innings. The Super Over target of 16 runs, in turn, was surmounted by a last ball six from Andre Russell. In the next game, the team ended the unbeaten run of Karachi Kings by beating them by 8 wickets in the chase of 154 runs. Luke Ronchi's aggressive innings of 71 (37) was the cornerstone of the victory. This meant that the team had qualified for the final.

In the final, Islamabad United won the match against Peshawer Zalmi after they chased a target of 149. Peshawar Zalmi won the toss and elected to bat first. Peshawar's in-form batsman Kamran Akmal was out lbw for one run off eight balls, with Samit Patel taking the wicket in the third over early on. Shadab Khan's three wickets restricted Peshawar to 148 runs. Islamabad's Luke Ronchi hit five sixes in the first five overs as he raced to 45 runs off just 15 balls, before he got out in the ninth over after scoring a 26-ball 52 in the second innings. By the time, Ronchi and Sahibzada Farhan - who played his own part with 44 runs off 33 balls - had put on 96 runs for the opening partnership in under nine overs. However, a sudden collapse resulted in Islamabad losing six wickets for 20 runs, leaving them at 116/6. The winning runs were scored by Faheem Ashraf who hooked Wahab Riaz for six with just one run required.

=== 2019 season ===
Islamabad United
2019 season
- Coach: Dean Jones
- Captain: Mohammad Sami (9 matches); Shadab Khan (3 matches)
- PSL 2019: Eliminator 2
- Most runs: Cameron Delport (355)
- Most wickets: Faheem Ashraf (21)

In the opening match of the season, United defeated Lahore Qalandars after chasing down 171 in the 20th over, winning the match by five wickets. They then went on to lose their next two games against Multan Sultans by five wickets and Quetta Gladiators by seven wickets, respectively. In the next game against Peshawar Zalmi, Being sent to bat first, the defending champions were 49–3 at one stage before Ian Bell and Cameron Delport put on 56 runs which helped the team post a competitive total of 158 for nine in 20 overs. In the chase of 158, Zalmi were reeling at 65 for five at one stage. Kieron Pollard and Darren Sammy steadied the team with their 55-run partnership. Zalmi hopes of winnings were dashed after Pollard departed after scoring 51 runs. In the end, Islamabad managed to win by 12 runs after captain Mohammad Sami's hat-trick in the last over.

Regular Captain Mohammad Sami was out injured and young Shadab Khan had to lead the team for the first time. However, this did not stop United from building their winning run as they won against Karachi Kings pretty easily in the end, thanks to Luke Ronchi's 35 balls 67 runs that won him Man of the Match award. In the next fixture against Multan they had a very bad day, batting first they were bowled out for 121 runs and losing the match by six wickets. However, they won their next match against Kings. Kings started well with the bat and at one stage were looking to set a total over 200, but United bowlers bowled really well during the death overs to restrict Kings on 168 runs, mainly due to Faheem Ashraf and Rumman Raees. They started off well with the bat but few quite overs during the middle part of the innings meant United were in trouble, but thanks to Asif Ali who hit Kings bowlers to all parts of the ground, scoring 70 runs from 38 balls to ensure that United chase down the target with four balls to spare.

=== 2020 season ===
Islamabad United
2020 season
- Coach: Misbah-ul-Haq
- Captain: Shadab Khan
- PSL 2020: 6th (eliminated)
- Most runs: Luke Ronchi (247)
- Most wickets: Shadab Khan (8)

Ahead of the season, Pakistan men's national team head coach and chief selector Misbah-ul-Haq was named as head coach, replacing Dean Jones who coached the team from the first season till the fourth season. Shadab Khan was named as the captain of the team, with that he became the youngest captain in PSL history.

=== 2021 season ===
Islamabad United
2021 season
- Coach: Johan Botha
- Captain: Shadab Khan
- PSL 2021: Play-offs (3rd)
- League stage: 1st
- Most runs: Colin Munro (285)
- Most wickets: Hasan Ali (13)

In the 2021 Pakistan Super League, Islamabad United were led by captain Shadab Khan. and coached by Johan Botha The team finished first in the league stage, demonstrating consistent performances across the group matches. They qualified for the playoffs but were eliminated in the semi-final, finishing third overall. Colin Munro was the leading run-scorer for the team, while Hasan Ali led the bowling attack. Their standout match was a dominant win against Lahore Qalandars where Munro scored a quick 72* to chase down a challenging total.

=== 2022 season ===
Islamabad United
2022 season
- Coach: Azhar Mahmood
- Captain: Shadab Khan
- PSL 2022: Play-offs (3rd)
- Most runs: Alex Hales (355)
- Most wickets: Shadab Khan (19)

In the 2022 Pakistan Super League, Islamabad United, captained by Shadab Khan and coached by Azhar Mahmood, finished third in the league stage and qualified for the playoffs. They were eliminated in the playoff round, finishing third overall. Alex Hales scored the most runs for the team with 355, while Shadab Khan led the wickets tally with 19. The team’s standout performance came in a thrilling league-stage win against Karachi Kings, where Hales' aggressive 88 runs guided United to a narrow victory.

=== 2024 season ===
Islamabad United
2024 season
- Coach: Mike Hossen
- Captain: Shadab Khan
- PSL 2024: Champions (1st)
- Most runs: Colin Munro (326)
- Most wickets: Shadab Khan (14)

== Team identity ==
The team logo and name was revealed on 22 December 2015 in a ceremony held at the Polo Club in Islamabad. The logo features a lion. The team's primary colours are red, orange and a light shade of brown.

Fawad Khan was the team's star ambassador between 2016 and 2018, while Ali Zafar was the team's star ambassador only for 2016 season. The franchise has also focused on Empowerment and Momina Mustehsan joined the team as its Empowerment Champion in 2017 season. The team's anthem in the initial season was "Chakka Choka" sung by Ali Zafar. In 2017, new anthems of the team were released; "Cricket Jorray Pakistan" was sung by Momina Mustehsan, and "Kitna Rola Daalay Ga" by Abdullah Qureshi.

Dostea was the main sponsor and shirt sponsor of the team in 2016 while Cinepax and GLO Merchandise were merchandise sponsors. WWF Pakistan are the team's official partners. Mocca are team's current official food partners with Dunya News and FM 101 the news and entertainment partners of the team respectively while PTV Sports is team's brand and media partner. For the second season, United signed with JS Bank as the title sponsor and Q Mobile as team's main partner respectively. Other partners are PTCL, Yayvo and Igloo.

Ahead of 2019 season, franchise changed the design of the kit, previous kit had an equal shade of red and gold. However, the new kit for PSL 2019 featured red as a prominent shade with gold reduced to a minimum.

Year	Shirt sponsor (chest)	Shirt sponsor (back)	Chest branding	Sleeve branding
2016	Dostea		Dunya News	Dostea
2017	Q Mobile	PTCL	JS Bank	Dunya News
2018	Gwadar Golf City	PTCL	Tang	Samaa TV, G.F.C, Dairy Milk
2019	Bisconni		Fast cables	Samaa TV, Tetra Pak, Sprite
2020	Dastak		Fast cables	Express News, FM 101
2021	Sabroso	Ufone	Fast cables	ZEM Builders, Snack Video, Tetra Pak
2022	Sabroso	jomo.pk	Fast cables	DCODE, Tetra Pak, foodpanda
2023	Sabroso	Ufone	Fast cables	MOCCA, Tetra Pak, foodpanda
2024	Foodpanda	Tim Hortons	Fast cables	Tetra Pak, Hum News, TCL
2025	Mezan	Binance	Fast cables	Tetra Pak, Sensodyne, Daewoo Express, Dunya News
2026	Hico	Binance	Fast cables	TCF, Jazz 5G, AAN Foundation, City Islamabad

== Current squad ==
Key
Symbol	Meaning
	Captain
	Overseas player

Key
- Players with international caps are listed in **bold**.
- * denotes a player who is fully unavailable
- * denotes a player who will be partially unavailable

No.	Name	Nationality	Birth date	Salary	Batting style	Bowling style	Year signed	Notes
Batsmen
80	**Mark Chapman**	New Zealand	27 June 1994 (age 32)	PKR 7.0 crore	Left-handed	Slow left-arm orthodox	2026	
86	Sameer Minhas	Pakistan	2 October 2006 (age 20)	PKR 1.90 crore	Right-handed	Right-arm leg break	2026	
46	**Haider Ali**	Pakistan	2 October 2000 (age 26)	PKR 1.50 crore	Right-handed	—	2026	
98	Mohammad Faiq	Pakistan	31 March 1997 (age 29)	PKR 60 lakh	Right-handed	Right-arm off break	2026	
10	Mohsin Riaz	Pakistan	8 June 2000 (age 26)	PKR 60 lakh	Right-handed	—	2026	
All-rounders
7	**Shadab Khan**	Pakistan	4 October 1998 (age 28)	PKR 7.0 crore	Right-handed	Right-arm leg-break	2017	
41	**Faheem Ashraf**	Pakistan	16 January 1993 (age 33)	PKR 8.50 crore	Left-handed	Right-arm fast-medium	2026	
9	**Imad Wasim**	Pakistan	18 December 1988 (age 37)	PKR 2.20 crore	Left-handed	Slow left-arm orthodox	2026	
45	**Dipendra Singh Airee**	Nepal	24 January 2000 (age 26)	PKR 60 lakh	Right-handed	Right-arm off-break	2026	
93	**Chris Green**	Australia	1 October 1993 (age 33)	PKR 1.40 crore	Right-handed	Right-arm off-break	2026	
Wicket-keepers
88	**Devon Conway**	New Zealand	8 July 1991 (age 35)	PKR 6.30 crore	Left-handed	Right-arm medium	2026	
68	**Andries Gous**	United States	24 November 1993 (age 32)	PKR 1.4 crore	Right-handed	—	2025	
Bowlers
99	Salman Irshad	Pakistan	3 December 1995 (age 30)	PKR 1.2 crore	Right-handed	Right-arm fast	2025	
11	Mehran Mumtaz	Pakistan	7 April 2003 (age 23)	PKR 1.20 crore	Left-handed	Slow left-arm orthodox	2026	
99	Mir Hamza Sajjad	Pakistan	24 June 1996 (age 30)	PKR 70 lakh	Right-handed	Right-arm fast	2026	
14	Sameen Gul	Pakistan	4 February 1999 (age 27)	PKR 60 lakh	Right-handed	Right-arm fast-medium	2026	
71	**Richard Gleeson**	England	2 December 1987 (age 38)	PKR 1.10 crore	Right-handed	Right-arm fast-medium	2026	
87	**Mohammad Hasnain**	Pakistan	5 April 2000 (age 26)	PKR 77.5 lakh	Right-handed	Right-arm fast	2026	
82	**Salman Mirza**	Pakistan	1 January 1994 (age 32)	PKR 3.92 crore	Right-handed	Left-arm fast-medium	2026	
18	Nisar Ahmad	Pakistan	5 August 1995 (age 31)	PKR 60 lakh	Right-handed	Right-arm medium-fast	2026	

- Source: ESPNcricinfo

== Management and coaching staff ==
Position	Name
CEO	Rehan Ul Haq
Team manager	Azlan Khan
Head coach	Luke Ronchi
Assistant coach	Jacob Oram
Batting coach	Ashley Wright
Bowling coach	Ian Butler
Analyst	Ben Jones
Team doctor	Cliffe Deacon

- Source: Official website.

== Captains ==
As of 26 March 2024

Name	From	To	Mat	Won	Lost	Tie&W	Tie&L	NR	%W
Misbah-ul-Haq	2016	2018	26	15	10	1	0	0	57.69
Shane Watson	2016	2016	2	1	1	0	0	0	50.00
Rumman Raees	2018	2018	2	1	1	0	0	0	50.00
JP Duminy	2018	2018	2	2	0	0	0	0	100.00
Mohammad Sami	2019	2019	9	4	5	0	0	0	44.44
Shadab Khan	2019	present	68	39	29	0	0	0	57.35
Usman Khawaja	2021	2021	1	1	0	0	0	0	100.00
Asif Ali	2022	2022	3	0	3	0	0	0	0.00
Chris Green	2026	2026	1	0	1	0	0	0	0.00

== Result summary ==
=== Overall result in PSL ===
Year	Pld	Won	Lost	Tie	NR	Position	Summary
2016	8	4	4	0	0	3/5	Champions
2017	8	4	4	0	0	4/5	Play-offs
2018	10	7	3	0	0	1/6	Champions
2019	10	5	5	0	0	3/6	Play-offs
2020	10	3	6	0	1	6/6	League stage
2021	10	8	2	0	0	1/6	Play-offs
2022	10	4	6	0	0	4/6	Play-offs
2023	10	6	4	0	0	3/6	Play-offs
2024	10	5	4	0	1	3/6	Champions
2025	10	6	4	0	0	3/6	Play-offs
Total	96	52	42	0	2	3 titles	

=== Performance visuals ===
League position by season
1st										
2nd										
3rd										
4th										
6th										
	'16	'17	'18	'19	'20	'21	'22	'23	'24	'25

Win/loss ratio (2016-2025)
■ Wins (52)	54.2%
■ Losses (42)	43.7%
■ NR (2)	2.1%

== Head-to-head record ==
Opposition	Span	Mat	Won	Lost	Tie+W	Tie+L	NR	Win%
Karachi Kings	2016–2026	25	19	6	0	0	0	76.00
Lahore Qalandars	2016–2026	23	12	11	1	0	0	52.17
Multan Sultans	2018–2026	19	10	9	0	0	0	52.6
Peshawar Zalmi	2016–2026	27	13	13	0	0	0	50.00
Quetta Gladiators	2016–2025	23	11	12	0	0	0	47.82

IU performance vs opponents (2025)
18:6	10:11	10:8	13:13	10:12
KK	LQ	MS	PZ	QG

Key: ■ Islamabad United Won | ■ Opposition Won
Source: ESPNcricinfo, Last updated: 23 February 2026

== Statistics ==
As of 22 February 2026

=== Most runs ===
Player	Years	Innings	Runs	High score
Colin Munro	2020–2025	46	1,538	90*
Shadab Khan	2017–2025	77	1,413	91
Asif Ali	2016–2023	66	1,130	75
Luke Ronchi	2018–2020	31	1,020	94*
Alex Hales	2018–2025	37	996	88

Most runs (IU 2026)
1538	1413	1130	1020	996
Munro	Shadab	Asif	Ronchi	Hales

- Source: ESPNcricinfo

=== Most wickets ===
Player	Years	Innings	Wickets	Best bowling
Shadab Khan	2017–2025	92	105	5/28
Faheem Ashraf	2018–2024	70	78	6/19
Rumman Raees	2016–2024	42	45	4/25
Mohammad Sami	2016–2019	36	42	5/8
Hasan Ali	2021–2023	27	35	3/30

Most wickets (IU 2026)
105	78	45	42	35
Shadab	Faheem	Rumman	Sami	Hasan

- Source: ESPNcricinfo

== See also ==
- Multan Sultan
- Karachi Kings
- Lahore Qalandars
- Peshawar Zalmi
- Quetta Gladiators
