= 2016 Quetta Gladiators season =

Pakistani franchise cricket team

Quetta Gladiators
2016 season
- Coach: Moin Khan
- Captain: Sarfraz Ahmed
- PSL 2016: 2nd (runner-up)
- Most runs: Ahmed Shehzad (290)
- Most wickets: Mohammad Nawaz (13)

The Quetta Gladiators is a franchise cricket team that represents Quetta in the Pakistan Super League. They are one of the five teams that had a competition in the 2016 Pakistan Super League. The team was captained by Sarfraz Ahmed, and they stand on second position after winning four matches from their eight matches in the PSL 2016. They finished runners-up after losing the final against Islamabad United. Ahmed Shehzad with 290 runs from 10 matches was the team's leading run scorer while Mohammad Nawaz with 13 wickets from 10 matches was the leading wicket taker for the team. They won runners-up prize money of US$200,000.

== Background ==
Quetta Gladiators is a franchise cricket team representing Quetta, which plays in the PSL. In 2015, the Pakistan Cricket Board (PCB) announced that the inaugural season of the Pakistan Super League would take place in February 2016 in the United Arab Emirates. Team is owned by Omar Associate a (Karachi based Company), which bought it for US$11 Million for 10 years. It finished second in the inaugural season of PSL in the 2016.

== Squad ==
Players with international caps before the start of the season are listed in bold .

Name	Nationality	Batting style	Bowling style	Notes
Batsmen
**Ahmed Shehzad**	Pakistan	Right-handed	Right-arm leg break	
**Kevin Pietersen**	England	Right-handed	Right-arm off break	Overseas
**Asad Shafiq**	Pakistan	Right-handed	Right-arm off break	
**Saad Nasim**	Pakistan	Right-handed	Right-arm leg break	
Rameez Raja	Pakistan	Right-handed	Right-arm off break	
All-rounders
Mohammad Nawaz	Pakistan	Right-handed	slow left-arm orthodox	
**Anwar Ali**	Pakistan	Right-handed	Right-arm fast-medium	
**Thisara Perera**	Sri Lanka	Left-handed	Right-arm medium-fast	Overseas
**Luke Wright**	England	Right-handed	Right-arm medium-fast	Overseas
Akbar-ur-Rehman	Pakistan	Right-handed	Right-arm leg break	Emerging
**Bilal Asif**	Pakistan	Right-handed	Right-arm off Spin	
**Grant Elliott**	New Zealand	Right-handed	Right-arm fast-medium	Overseas
**Jason Holder**	West Indies	Right-handed	Right-arm medium-fast	Overseas
**Elton Chigumbura**	Zimbabwe	Right-handed	Right-arm medium-fast	Overseas
**Mohammad Nabi**	Afghanistan	Right-handed	Right-arm off spin	Overseas
Wicket-keeper
**Sarfraz Ahmed**	Pakistan	Right-handed	—	Captain
Bismillah Khan	Pakistan	Right-handed	—	Emerging
**Kumar Sangakkara**	Sri Lanka	Left-handed	—	Overseas
Bowlers
**Zulfiqar Babar**	Pakistan	Right-handed	Slow left-arm orthodox	
**Nathan McCullum**	New Zealand	Right-handed	Right-arm off spin	Overseas
**Jade Dernbach**	England	Right-handed	Right-arm medium-fast	Overseas
**Umar Gul**	Pakistan	Right-handed	Right-arm fast	
**Aizaz Cheema**	Pakistan	Right-handed	Right-arm fast	

== Kit manufacturers and sponsors ==
Shirt sponsor (chest)	Shirt sponsor (back)	Sleeve branding
Edenrobe	ACM Gold	PTV Sports, Zong

Playing kit

== Season summary ==
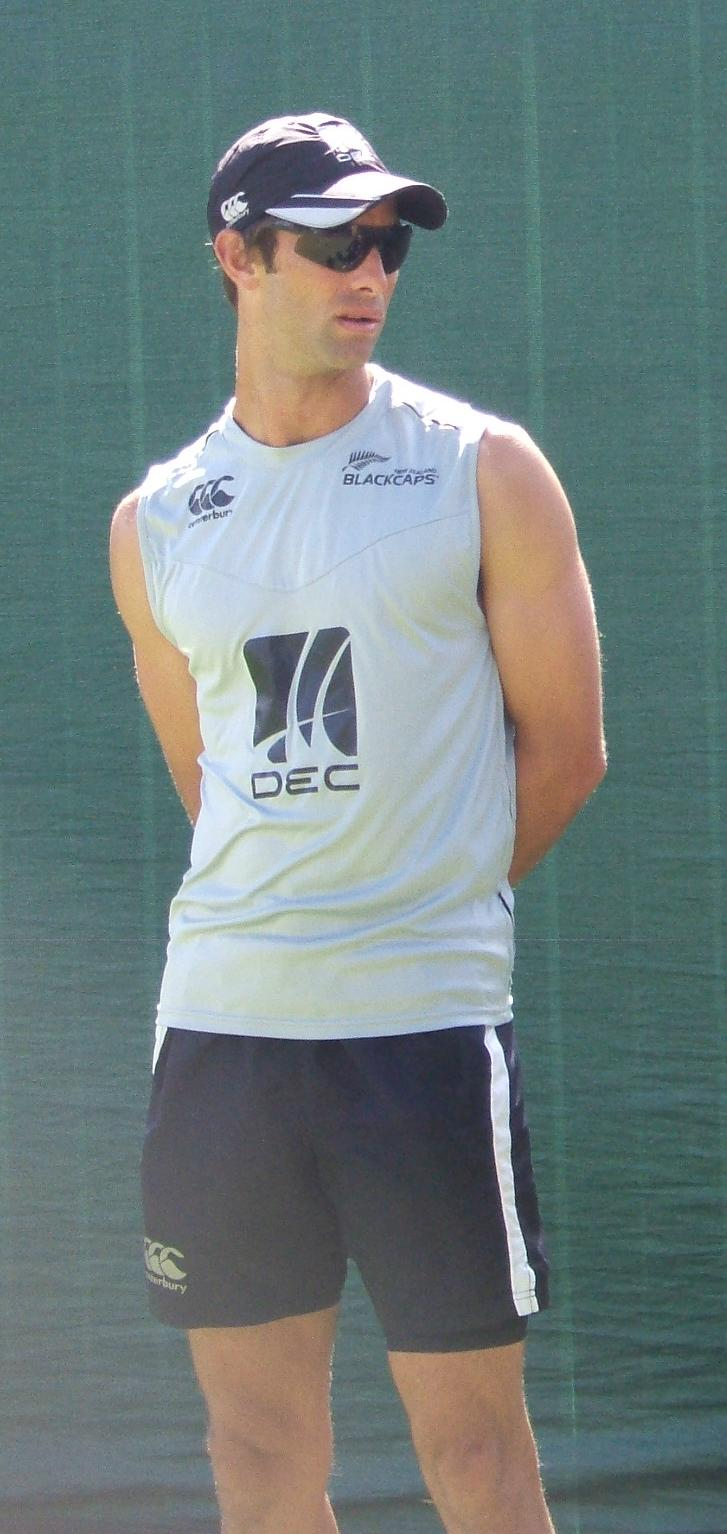
Grant Elliott was exceptional with the ball by taking 11 wickets in 6 matches

The Gladiators started their campaign with comfortable wins over Islamabad United and Karachi Kings before edging past Peshawar Zalmi in a closely fought match that went down to the last over. However, the team's campaign suffered a setback in the match against Lahore Qalandars where they were comprehensively beaten by 63 runs as the Gladiator's imploded in the second highest run chase of the tournament (195 runs) after (202 runs) was imploded on Gladiator's by Qalandars again.

In the second leg of the tournament, beginning in Sharjah, the Gladiators started off their campaign with a big win over Islamabad United. New Zealand all-rounder, Grant Elliott who had just joined the team proved instrumental in the win as he took 3 key wickets to restrict United to 117. The Gladiators chased down the target with almost four overs to spare. The win also took the team to the top of the table. In the following game against Karachi Kings, the Gladiators were once again comfortable in their win – beating their opponents by 6 wickets. This victory also ensured that Quetta Gladiators were the first team to go through to the qualifying finals. On their next outing, against Peshawar Zalmi, the Gladiators were comprehensively beaten by 8 wickets. However, despite being reduced to 66–9 by an overwhelming spell by Shahid Afridi, the team managed to get to 129. This was made possible by a world record last wicket stand of 63 between Grant Elliott and Zulfiqar Babar. In their last match of the league stage, the Gladiators chased down the highest target of the tournament thus far (202) against Lahore Qalandars. Bismillah Khan, who was playing his debut innings in PSL and scored 55 from 30 and Mohammad Nabi whose 30 from 12 finished the game on the last ball of the match, were pivotal in the victory. Gladiators were placed 2nd on the league table behind Peshawar Zalmi after winning 6 of their 8 matches and qualifying for the play-offs.

The first qualifier of the inaugural Pakistan Super League was a nail-biting affair and came down to the last ball, with Quetta Gladiators holding their nerve to clinch one run win. Gladiators posted 133 thanks to Kevin Pietersen (53) well supported by Kumar Sangakkara (37) after disastrous start, in reply Peshawar Zalmi scoring 132 in their 20 Overs Darren Sammy's 38 from 29 could not save the team. Zalmi were left needing eight runs from six balls;Gladiators required three wickets. A dot off the first ball of the over, bowled by Aizaz Cheema, titled the contest further Quetta's way. However, Wahab Riaz seemed to emerge an unlikely hero for Zalmi, slamming the second ball – a low full toss outside off – over cow corner for four. He then proceeded to take a single. Three needed off three, and it was anybody's game. Cheema, though, drastically turned the fate of the match with his next two deliveries. First Hasan Ali was out caught and bowled. Then, Wahab swung wildly in an attempt to finish the game, but ended up skying the ball straight to Ahmed Shehzad at point. Cheema was on a hat-trick and Muhammad Asghar had the unenviable task of striking the last ball for at least three. Cheema did not get his hat-trick, but more importantly, Asghar was unable to put the bowler's rising short ball away as a result Aizaz Cheema become hero for Gladiators and qualified for the Final.Gladiator's Mohammad Nawaz for his 3 for 27 and 20 runs was judged man of the match (third time in PSL) took them through to final. Gladiators finished runners-up in the inaugural HBL Pakistan Super League after they lost against Islamabad United in the final by six wickets. Misbah sent Gladiators to bat first, riding on the back of half-tons by Ahmed Shehzad (64) and Kumar Sangakkara (55), they scored 174–7 in their 20 overs. Andre Russell who finished the tournament as leading wicket-taker took 3 for 37 from 4 Overs. In reply Gladiators Started really badly as from United's Dwayne Smith (73) and Brad Haddin unbeaten 61 gelled to put up an 85 run partnership under pressure for the second wicket to help their team past the finishing line in 19th Over of the game. Ahmed Shehzad was the Leading run scorer with 290 from 10 matches while Mohammad Nawaz with 13 wickets from 10 matches was the leading wicket taker for the team. They won runners-up US$200,000 prize money.

=== Season standings ===
Pos	Team	Pld	W	L	NR	Pts	NRR
1	Peshawar Zalmi (3rd)	8	6	2	0	12	0.573
2	Quetta Gladiators (R)	8	6	2	0	12	0.216
3	Islamabad United (C)	8	4	4	0	8	−0.282
4	Karachi Kings (4th)	8	2	6	0	4	−0.036
5	Lahore Qalandars	8	2	6	0	4	−0.536

Source: Espncricinfo

=== Match log ===
No.	Date	Opponent	Venue	Result	Scorecard
1	4 February	Islamabad United	Dubai International Cricket Stadium	Won by 8 wickets	Scorecard
2	6 February	Karachi Kings	Dubai International Cricket Stadium	Won by 8 wickets	Scorecard
3	7 February	Peshawar Zalmi	Dubai International Cricket Stadium	Won by 3 wickets	Scorecard
4	8 February	Lahore Qalandars	Dubai International Cricket Stadium	Lost by 63 runs	Scorecard
5	11 February	Islamabad United	Sharjah Cricket Stadium	Won by 7 wickets	Scorecard
6	13 February	Karachi Kings	Sharjah Cricket Stadium	Won by 5 wickets	Scorecard
7	14 February	Peshawar Zalmi	Sharjah Cricket Stadium	Lost by 8 wickets	Scorecard
8	16 February	Lahore Qalandars	Dubai International Cricket Stadium	Won by 2 wickets	Scorecard
9	19 February	Peshawar Zalmi (Qualifier 1)	Dubai International Cricket Stadium	Won by 1 run	Scoreard
10	23 February	Islamabad United (Final)	Dubai International Cricket Stadium	Lost by 6 wickets	Scoreard
