= 2016 Peshawar Zalmi season =

Inaugural season of Peshawar Zalmi

Peshawar Zalmi
2016 season
- Coach: Mohammad Akram
- Captain: Shahid Afridi
- Playoff: 3rd place
- Most runs: Tamim Iqbal (267)
- Most wickets: Wahab Riaz (15)

The Peshawar Zalmi is a franchise cricket team that represents Peshawar in the Pakistan Super League (PSL). They were one of the five teams that competed in the 2016 Pakistan Super League. The team was captained by Shahid Afridi, and won six of their eight matches in the inaugural edition of the PSL in 2016.

== Background ==
Peshawar Zalmi is a franchise cricket team representing Peshawar, which plays in the Pakistan Super League (PSL). In 2015, the Pakistan Cricket Board (PCB) announced that the inaugural season of the Pakistan Super League would take place in February 2016 in the United Arab Emirates. CEO of Haier Javed Afridi (cousin of Shahid Afridi) bought the team for US$16 million for a ten-year period. It finished third in the inaugural season of PSL in 2016.

== Squad ==
Players with international caps before the start of the season are listed in bold.

Name	Nationality	Batting style	Bowling style	Notes
Batsmen
**Mohammad Hafeez**	Pakistan	Right-handed	Right-arm off spin	
**Tamim Iqbal**	Bangladesh	Left-handed	—	Overseas
Shahid Yousuf	Pakistan	Right-handed	—	
Israrullah	Pakistan	Left-handed	—	
Musadiq Ahmed	Pakistan	Right-handed	—	
**Brad Hodge**	Australia	Right-handed	—	Overseas
Dawid Malan	England	Left-handed	Right-arm leg break	Overseas
All-rounders
**Shahid Afridi**	Pakistan	Right-handed	Right-arm leg spin	Captain
**Aamer Yamin**	Pakistan	Right-handed	Right-arm medium	
**Darren Sammy**	West Indies	Right-handed	Right-arm medium-fast	Overseas
Jim Allenby	Australia	Right-handed	Right arm medium	Overseas
Wicket-keeper
**Kamran Akmal**	Pakistan	Right-handed	—	
**Jonny Bairstow**	England	Right-handed	—	Overseas
Bowlers
**Abdur Rehman**	Pakistan	Left-handed	Left-arm off spin	
**Junaid Khan**	Pakistan	Left-handed	Left-arm fast	
**Wahab Riaz**	Pakistan	Right-handed	Left-arm fast	
**Shaun Tait**	Australia	Right-handed	Right-arm fast	Overseas
**Imran Khan**	Pakistan	Right-handed	Left-arm medium fast	
Hasan Ali	Pakistan	Right-handed	Right-arm medium-fast	
Taj Wali	Pakistan	Left-handed	Left arm medium-fast	
Muhammad Asghar	Pakistan	Left-handed	Left arm spinner	

== Kit manufacturers and sponsors ==
Kit manufacturer	Shirt sponsor (chest)	Shirt sponsor (back)	Chest branding	Sleeve branding
Zalmi in-house	Bahria Town	Giggly Boom Boom Bubblegum	Brighto Paints	Hum TV, Junaid Jamshed, Zic Motor Oil

Playing kit

== Pakistan Super League ==
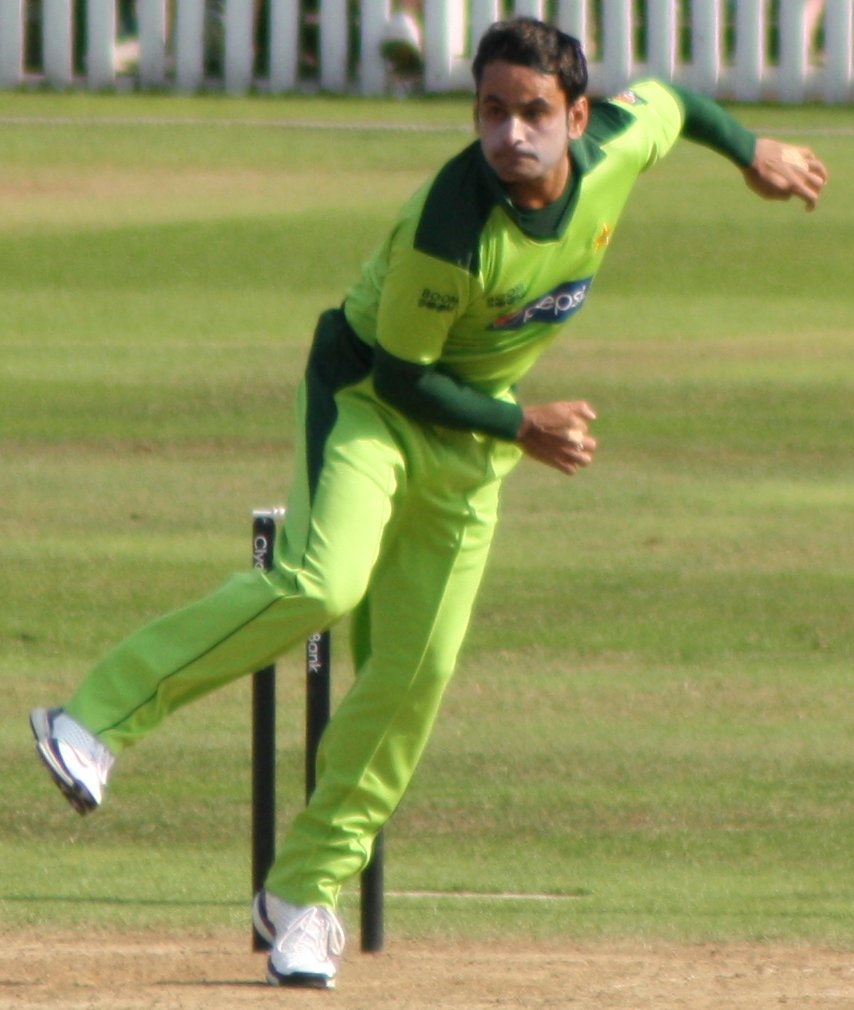
Mohammad Hafeez was one of team's star performers with the bat in the 2016 Season

Before the start of the league zalmis were considered as a strongest team and team to beat in first PSL.They proved every body right by winning their first two matches Thanks to brilliant performances from their openers Mohammad Hafeez and Tamim Iqbal Zalmi who played their first two matches on 5 and 6 February against Islamabad United and Lahore Qalandars respectively winning both of them beating United by 24 runs and Qalandars by 9 wickets. Their winning run ended after losing a close match against the underdogs of 2016 PSL Quetta Gladiators. after completing group stage matches they won six from eight matches losing against Lahore Qalandars in a close match and Quetta Gladiators they finished first in points table qualifying for the play-offs where they played against Quetta Gladiators in Qualifier 1. The first qualifier of the inaugural Pakistan Super League was a nail-biting affair and came down to the last ball, with Quetta Gladiators holding their nerve to clinch one run win. Gladiators posted 133 thanks to Kevin Pietersen (53) well supported by Kumar Sangakkara (37) after disastrous start, in reply Peshawar scoring 132 in their 20 Overs Darren Sammy's 38 from 29 could not save the team. Zalmi were left needing eight runs from six balls;Gladiators required three wickets. A dot off the first ball of the over, bowled by Aizaz Cheema, titled the contest further Quetta's way. However, Wahab Riaz seemed to emerge an unlikely hero for Zalmi, slamming the second ball – a low full toss outside off – over cow corner for four. He then proceeded to take a single. Three needed off three, and it was anybody's game. Cheema, though, drastically turned the fate of the match with his next two deliveries. First Hasan Ali was out caught and bowled. Then, Wahab swung wildly in an attempt to finish the game, but ended up skying the ball straight to Ahmed Shehzad at point. Cheema was on a hat-trick and Muhammad Asghar had the unenviable task of striking the last ball for at least three. Cheema did not get his hat-trick, but more importantly, Asghar was unable to put the bowler's rising short ball away as a result Aizaz Cheema became hero for Gladiators who qualified for the Final. Gladiators' Mohammad Nawaz was judged man of the match against Zalmi for his 3 for 27 and 20 runs. Islamabad United qualified for 2016 Pakistan Super League Final match by defeating Zalmi. United set 177 runs target for Zalmi after being asked to bat first. United's batsman Sharjeel Khan's 117 from 62 balls against Zalmi's strong bowling line-up proved to be the difference between them and United. Zalmi only managed 126 runs after a blistering inning from Shahid Afridi in the end of 38 from 17 balls and earlier Kamran Akmal scored 45 from 32 balls. As a result of this loss they were eliminated from the tournament. Wahab Riaz with 15 wickets was the leading wicket-taker for the team. Tamim Iqbal with 267 runs was the team's leading run scorer.

=== Season standings ===
Pos	Team	Pld	W	L	NR	Pts	NRR
1	Peshawar Zalmi (3rd)	8	6	2	0	12	0.573
2	Quetta Gladiators (R)	8	6	2	0	12	0.216
3	Islamabad United (C)	8	4	4	0	8	−0.282
4	Karachi Kings (4th)	8	2	6	0	4	−0.036
5	Lahore Qalandars	8	2	6	0	4	−0.536

Source: Espncricinfo

=== Match log ===
Match	Date	Opponent	Venue	Result	Scorecard
1	5 February	Islamabad United	Dubai International Cricket Stadium	Won by 24 runs	Scorecard
2	6 February	Lahore Qalandars	Dubai International Cricket Stadium	Won by 9 wickets	Scorecard
3	7 February	Quetta Gladiators	Dubai International Cricket Stadium	Lost by 3 wickets	Scorecard
4	11 February	Karachi Kings	Sharjah Cricket Stadium	Won by 3 runs	Scorecard
5	12 February	Islamabad United	Sharjah Cricket Stadium	Won by 7 wickets	Scorecard
6	13 February	Lahore Qalandars	Sharjah Cricket Stadium	Lost by 4 runs	Scorecard
7	14 February	Quetta Gladiators	Sharjah Cricket Stadium	Won by 8 wickets	Scorecard
8	17 February	Karachi Kings	Dubai International Cricket Stadium	Won by 5 wickets	Scorecard
9	19 February	Quetta Gladiators (Qualifier 1)	Dubai International Cricket Stadium	Lost by 1 run	Scoreard
10	21 February	Islamabad United (Qualifier 2)	Dubai International Cricket Stadium	Lost by 50 runs	Scoreard
