= 2016 Pakistan Super League =

1st edition of the Pakistan Super League

HBL Pakistan Super League 2016
- Dates: 4 – 23 February 2016
- Administrator: Pakistan Cricket Board
- Cricket format: Twenty20
- Tournament format(s): Double round robin and playoffs
- Host: United Arab Emirates
- Champions: Islamabad United (1st title)
- Runners-up: Quetta Gladiators
- Participants: 5
- Matches: 24
- Attendance: 201,609 (8,400 per match)
- Player of the series: Ravi Bopara (KK) (329 runs and 11 wickets)
- Most runs: Umar Akmal (LQ) (335)
- Most wickets: Andre Russell (IU) (16)
- Official website: psl-t20.com

The 2016 Pakistan Super League, also known as PSL 1 and branded as HBL PSL 2016, was the debut edition of the Pakistan Super League, a professional Twenty20 cricket league established by the Pakistan Cricket Board (PCB). The tournament featured five teams and was held from 4 to 23 February 2016 in the United Arab Emirates. The opening ceremony and first match of the tournament were held at the Dubai International Cricket Stadium on 4 February 2016.

The final was held in Dubai on 23 February and saw Islamabad United defeating Quetta Gladiators by 6 wickets to win the first title. Dwayne Smith of Islamabad United was awarded the man of the match award for his innings of 73 runs from 51 balls. Ravi Bopara of the Karachi Kings was named player of the tournament.

Around half of the TV viewing audience in Pakistan watched matches in the competition at peak times.

== Opening ceremony ==
The opening ceremony of the tournament was held at the Dubai International Cricket Stadium in Dubai on 4 February 2016, hosted by Yasir Hussain and Sri Lankan model Stephanie Siriwardhana. It featured live performances by singer Ali Zafar, Jamaican rapper and singer Sean Paul, Mohib Mirza, Sanam Saeed and other artists and ended with a firework display. A large crowd attended the ceremony at the stadium.

== Player acquisition and salaries ==
The player draft for the 2016 season was held at Gaddafi Stadium in Lahore on 21–22 December 2015. 308 players, including both Pakistani and international players, were divided into five different categories. Each franchise was allowed to pick a maximum of six foreign players in their squads which could have a maximum of 20 members.

=== Squads ===
Islamabad United	Peshawar Zalmi	Lahore Qalandars	Karachi Kings	Quetta Gladiators
Misbah-ul-Haq (c); Babar Azam; Sharjeel Khan; Khalid Latif; Hussain Talat; Umar Siddiq; Shane Watson; Azhar Mahmood; Kamran Ghulam; Umar Amin; Dwayne Smith; Andre Russell; Ashar Zaidi; Sam Billings (wk); Brad Haddin (wk); Saeed Ajmal; Mohammad Irfan; Mohammad Sami; Samuel Badree; Rumman Raees; Amad Butt; Imran Khalid	Shahid Afridi (c); Mohammad Hafeez; Tamim Iqbal; Shahid Yousuf; Israrullah; Musadiq Ahmed; Brad Hodge; Dawid Malan; Aamer Yamin; Darren Sammy; Jim Allenby; Kamran Akmal (wk); Jonny Bairstow (wk); Abdur Rehman; Junaid Khan; Wahab Riaz; Shaun Tait; Imran Khan; Hasan Ali; Taj Wali; Mohammad Asghar	Azhar Ali (c); Mukhtar Ahmed; Chris Gayle; Cameron Delport; Sohaib Maqsood; Naved Yasin; Imran Butt; Abdul Razzaq; Hammad Azam; Zohaib Khan; Dwayne Bravo; Kevon Cooper; Mohammad Rizwan (wk); Umar Akmal; Zafar Gohar; Yasir Shah; Ajantha Mendis; Mustafizur Rahman; Zia-ul-Haq; Adnan Rasool; Ehsan Adil	Shoaib Malik (c); Iftikhar Ahmed; Nauman Anwar; Lendl Simmons; Shahzaib Hasan; Fawad Alam; James Vince; Owais Shah; Imad Wasim; Ravi Bopara; TM Dilshan; Shakib Al Hasan; Bilawal Bhatti; Sohail Tanvir; Mushfiqur Rahim (wk); Riki Wessels (wk); Saifullah Bangash (wk); Sohail Khan; Mohammad Amir; Usama Mir; Mir Hamza	Sarfraz Ahmed (c)(wk); Ahmed Shehzad; Kevin Pietersen; Asad Shafiq; Saad Nasim; Rameez Raja; Mohammad Nawaz; Anwar Ali; Luke Wright; Akbar-ur-Rehman; Bilal Asif; Grant Elliott; Elton Chigumbura; Mohammad Nabi; Bismillah Khan (wk); Kumar Sangakkara (wk); Zulfiqar Babar; Umar Gul; Aizaz Cheema; Nathan McCullum

== Officials ==
Seven umpires and two match referees made up the match officials panel for the tournament. Pakistan's top ICC umpire Aleem Dar stood in matches during the tournament as did West Indian ICC umpire Joel Wilson. Also a part of the panel were other Pakistani umpires Ahsan Raza, Shozab Raza, Ahmed Shahab, Rashid Riaz and Khalid Mahmood. The match referees panel consisted of former Sri Lankan ICC match referee Roshan Mahanama and Pakistani match referee Mohammad Anees.

== Promotion and media coverage ==
The official anthem of PSL season I, "Ab Khel Ke Dikha" was released on 30 September 2015. It was written, composed and sung by Ali Zafar.

== Venues ==
The venue for the tournament was originally planned to be a single stadium in Doha, Qatar. In September 2015 the Pakistan Cricket Board announced the shifting of the tournament to Dubai and Sharjah in the United Arab Emirates.

Dubai	Sharjah
Dubai International Cricket Stadium	Sharjah Cricket Association Stadium
Capacity: 30,000	Capacity: 15,000
2016 Pakistan Super League is located in United Arab Emirates

== Format ==
PSL Playoffs

Each team played each other twice in the league stage of the tournament in a round robin format. As matches were played in the UAE, all games were effectively at a neutral venue. Following the group stage the top four teams qualified for the playoff stage of the tournament.

The 2016 season of the PSL followed rules and regulations laid down by the International Cricket Council. In the group stage, two points were awarded for a win, one for a no result and none for a loss. In the event of tied scores after both teams faced their quota of overs, a super over would have been used to determine the match winner. In the group stage teams were ranked on the following criteria:

1. Higher number of points
2. If equal, higher number of wins
3. If equal, fewest defeats
4. If still equal, the results of head-to-head meetings
5. If still equal, net run rate

If any play-off match had finished with a no result, a super over would have been used to determine the winner. If the super over had not have been possible or the result of the over was a tie, the team which finished in the highest league position at the end of the regular season would have been deemed the winner of the match.

== League stage ==
=== Points table ===
Pos	Team	Pld	W	L	NR	Pts	NRR
1	Peshawar Zalmi (3rd)	8	6	2	0	12	0.573
2	Quetta Gladiators (R)	8	6	2	0	12	0.216
3	Islamabad United (C)	8	4	4	0	8	−0.282
4	Karachi Kings (4th)	8	2	6	0	4	−0.036
5	Lahore Qalandars	8	2	6	0	4	−0.536

Source: Espncricinfo

Top 4 teams qualified for the Playoffs
Advanced to Qualifier
Advanced to Eliminator 1

Notes:

- C = Champions;
- R = Runner-up;
- (x) = Position at the end of the tournament;

=== Summary ===
Visitor team →	IU	KK	LQ	PZ	QG
Home team ↓	IU	KK	LQ	PZ	QG
Islamabad United		Islamabad; 5 wickets	Islamabad; 5 wickets	Peshawar; 24 runs	Quetta; 7 wickets
Karachi Kings	Islamabad; 2 runs		Karachi; 7 wickets	Peshawar; 3 runs	Quetta; 5 wickets
Lahore Qalandars	Islamabad; 8 wickets	Karachi; 27 runs		Peshawar; 9 wickets	Quetta; 2 wickets
Peshawar Zalmi	Peshawar; 7 wickets	Peshawar; 5 wickets	Lahore; 4 runs		Peshawar; 8 wickets
Quetta Gladiators	Quetta; 8 wickets	Quetta; 8 wickets	Lahore; 63 runs	Quetta; 3 wickets	

Home team won	Visitor team won

- Note: Results listed are according to the home (horizontal) and visitor (vertical) teams.
- Note: Click on a result to see a summary of the match.

=== League progression ===
Team	Group matches								Playoffs		
Team	1	2	3	4	5	6	7	8	E1/Q	E2	F
Islamabad United	0	0	2	4	4	4	6	8	W	W	W
Karachi Kings	2	2	2	2	4	4	4	4	L		
Lahore Qalandars	0	0	2	2	2	4	4	4			
Peshawar Zalmi	2	4	4	6	8	8	10	12	L	L	
Quetta Gladiators	2	4	6	6	8	10	10	12	W		L

Win	Loss	No result

- Note: The total points at the end of each group match are listed.
- Note: Click on the points (group matches) or W/L (playoffs) to see the match summary.

== Fixtures ==
All times are in Pakistan Standard Time (UTC+5).

Match 1

4 February
22:30
Scorecard

Islamabad United; 128/7 (20 overs)	v	Quetta Gladiators; 132/2 (16 overs)
Misbah-ul-Haq 41 (28); Mohammad Nawaz 4/13 (4 overs)		Luke Wright 86* (53); Imran Khalid 2/20 (4 overs)

Quetta won by 8 wickets
Dubai International Cricket Stadium, Dubai
Umpires: Joel Wilson (West Indies) and Shozab Raza (Pakistan)
Player of the match: Mohammad Nawaz (Quetta Gladiators)

- Quetta Gladiators won the toss and elected to field.

Match 2

5 February
16:30 (D/N)
Scorecard

Lahore Qalandars; 125/8 (20 overs)	v	Karachi Kings; 131/3 (15.5 overs)
Mohammad Rizwan 37 (31); Mohammad Amir 3/27 (4 overs)		Lendl Simmons 62* (46); Zia-ul-Haq 1/7 (2 overs)

Karachi won by 7 wickets
Dubai International Cricket Stadium, Dubai
Umpires: Joel Wilson (West Indies) and Rashid Riaz (Pakistan)
Player of the match: Shakib Al Hasan (Karachi Kings)

- Karachi Kings won the toss and elected to field.
- Mohammad Amir took the first ever hat-trick in PSL history.

Match 3

5 February
21:00
Scorecard

Peshawar Zalmi; 145/7 (20 overs)	v	Islamabad United; 121/9 (20 overs)
Tamim Iqbal 51 (51); Andre Russell 3/31 (4 overs)		Shane Watson 28 (31); Mohammad Asghar 3/20 (4 overs)

Peshawar won by 24 runs
Dubai International Cricket Stadium, Dubai
Umpires: Shozab Raza (Pakistan) and Rashid Riaz (Pakistan)
Player of the match: Mohammad Asghar (Peshawar Zalmi)

- Peshawar Zalmi won the toss and elected to bat.

Match 4

6 February
16:30 (D/N)
Scorecard

Karachi Kings; 147/7 (20 overs)	v	Quetta Gladiators; 153/2 (17.2 overs)
Ravi Bopara 40 (29); Mohammad Nabi 2/32 (4 overs)		Ahmed Shehzad 71 (46); Imad Wasim 1/31 (4 overs)

Quetta won by 8 wickets
Dubai International Cricket Stadium, Dubai
Umpires: Shozab Raza (Pakistan) and Rashid Riaz (Pakistan)
Player of the match: Ahmed Shehzad (Quetta Gladiators)

- Quetta Gladiators won the toss and elected to field.

Match 5

6 February
21:00
Scorecard

Lahore Qalandars; 117/6 (20 overs)	v	Peshawar Zalmi; 118/1 (16 overs)
Dwayne Bravo 32 (31); Mohammad Asghar 2/11 (4 overs)		Tamim Iqbal 55* (47); Ajantha Mendis 1/23 (4 overs)

Peshawar won by 9 wickets
Dubai International Cricket Stadium, Dubai
Umpires: Joel Wilson (West Indies) and Rashid Riaz (Pakistan)
Player of the match: Tamim Iqbal (Peshawar Zalmi)

- Peshawar Zalmi won the toss and elected to field.

Match 6

7 February
16:30 (D/N)
Scorecard

Islamabad United; 132/8 (20 overs)	v	Karachi Kings; 130/9 (20 overs)
Khalid Latif 39 (35); Ravi Bopara 2/25 (4 overs)		Ravi Bopara 32* (19); Saeed Ajmal 3/27 (3 overs)

Islamabad won by 2 runs
Dubai International Cricket Stadium, Dubai
Umpires: Joel Wilson (West Indies) and Rashid Riaz (Pakistan)
Player of the match: Saeed Ajmal (Islamabad United)

- Karachi Kings won the toss and elected to field.

Match 7

7 February
21:00
Scorecard

Peshawar Zalmi; 135/7 (20 overs)	v	Quetta Gladiators; 139/7 (19.5 overs)
Darren Sammy 48 (31); Mohammad Nawaz 3/29 (4 Overs)		Kevin Pietersen 35 (29); Shahid Afridi 2/17 (4 overs)

Quetta won by 3 wickets
Dubai International Cricket Stadium, Dubai
Umpires: Shozab Raza (Pakistan) and Rashid Riaz (Pakistan)
Player of the match: Mohammad Nawaz (Quetta Gladiators)

- Quetta Gladiators won the toss and elected to field.

Match 8

8 February
21:00
Scorecard

Lahore Qalandars; 194/3 (20 overs)	v	Quetta Gladiators; 131 (16.2 overs)
Umar Akmal 93 (40); Anwar Ali 1/27 (4 overs)		Mohammad Nawaz 43 (34); Zafar Gohar 4/14 (3.2 overs)

Lahore won by 63 runs
Dubai International Cricket Stadium, Dubai
Umpires: Joel Wilson (West Indies) and Aleem Dar (Pakistan)
Player of the match: Umar Akmal (Lahore Qalandars)

- Quetta Gladiators won the toss and elected to field.

Match 9

10 February
21:00
Scorecard

Lahore Qalandars; 166/6 (20 overs)	v	Islamabad United; 169/2 (15.5 overs)
Mohammad Rizwan 50* (27); Mohammad Sami 2/21 (3 overs)		Sharjeel Khan 79* (43); Ehsan Adil 2/41 (3.5 overs)

Islamabad won by 8 wickets
Sharjah Cricket Stadium, Sharjah
Umpires: Joel Wilson (West Indies) and Aleem Dar (Pakistan)
Player of the match: Sharjeel Khan (Islamabad United)

- Islamabad United won the toss and elected to field.
- The opening partnership of 153 runs between Sharjeel Khan and Shane Watson in this match was the highest in PSL 2016.

Match 10

11 February
16:30 (D/N)
Scorecard

Peshawar Zalmi; 182/4 (20 overs)	v	Karachi Kings; 179/9 (20 overs)
Mohammad Hafeez 59 (35); Ravi Bopara 2/31 (4 overs)		Ravi Bopara 67 (33); Wahab Riaz 2/29 (4 overs)

Peshawar won by 3 runs
Sharjah Cricket Stadium, Sharjah
Umpires: Shozab Raza (Pakistan) and Rashid Riaz (Pakistan)
Player of the match: Mohammad Hafeez (Peshawar Zalmi)

- Peshawar Zalmi won the toss and elected to bat.

Match 11

11 February
21:00
Scorecard

Islamabad United; 117 (19.1 overs)	v	Quetta Gladiators; 118/3 (16.1 overs)
Shane Watson 40 (28); Grant Elliott 3/25 (4 overs)		Sarfraz Ahmed 51* (39); Andre Russell 3/18 (3 overs)

Quetta won by 7 wickets
Sharjah Cricket Stadium, Sharjah
Umpires: Joel Wilson (West Indies) and Aleem Dar (Pakistan)
Player of the match: Grant Elliott (Quetta Gladiators)

- Quetta Gladiators won the toss and elected to field.

Match 12

12 February
16:30 (D/N)
Scorecard

Karachi Kings; 178/5 (20 overs)	v	Lahore Qalandars; 151/8 (20 overs)
Ravi Bopara 71* (43); Zafar Gohar 2/26 (3 overs)		Cameron Delport 55 (39); Ravi Bopara 6/16 (4 overs)

Karachi won by 27 runs
Sharjah Cricket Stadium, Sharjah
Umpires: Joel Wilson (West Indies) and Aleem Dar (Pakistan)
Player of the match: Ravi Bopara (Karachi Kings)

- Lahore Qalandars won the toss and elected to field.
- Ravi Bopara secured the first ever five-wicket haul in PSL in this match.

Match 13

12 February
21:00
Scorecard

Islamabad United; 152/6 (20 overs)	v	Peshawar Zalmi; 153/3 (18.3 overs)
Khalid Latif 59 (41); Wahab Riaz 2/24 (4 overs)		Tamim Iqbal 80* (58); Samuel Badree 1/23 (4 overs)

Peshawar won by 7 wickets
Sharjah Cricket Stadium, Sharjah
Umpires: Shozab Raza (Pakistan) and Rashid Riaz (Pakistan)
Player of the match: Tamim Iqbal (Peshawar Zalmi)

- Peshawar Zalmi won the toss and elected to field.

Match 14

13 February
16:30 (D/N)
Scorecard

Karachi Kings; 126/9 (20 overs)	v	Quetta Gladiators; 127/5 (18.5 overs)
Shoaib Malik 45 (38); Grant Elliott 4/15 (4 overs)		Ahmed Shehzad 41 (27); Usama Mir 2/27 (4 overs)

Quetta won by 5 wickets
Sharjah Cricket Stadium, Sharjah
Umpires: Shozab Raza (Pakistan) and Rashid Riaz (Pakistan)
Player of the match: Grant Elliott (Quetta Gladiators)

- Karachi Kings won the toss and elected to bat.

Match 15

13 February
21:00
Scorecard

Lahore Qalandars; 164/3 (20 overs)	v	Peshawar Zalmi; 160/7 (20 overs)
Cameron Delport 78 (61); Junaid Khan 2/32 (4 overs)		Dawid Malan 42 (35); Cameron Delport 3/18 (4 overs)

Lahore won by 4 runs
Sharjah Cricket Stadium, Sharjah
Umpires: Joel Wilson (West Indies) and Aleem Dar (Pakistan)
Player of the match: Cameron Delport (Lahore Qalandars)

- Peshawar Zalmi won the toss and elected to field.

Match 16

14 February
16:30 (D/N)
Scorecard

Karachi Kings; 128/7 (20 overs)	v	Islamabad United; 131/5 (18.5 overs)
Ravi Bopara 45 (50); Imran Khalid 2/19 (4 overs)		Misbah-ul-Haq 38 (38); Sohail Khan 2/24 (4 overs)

Islamabad won by 5 wickets
Sharjah Cricket Stadium, Sharjah
Umpires: Joel Wilson (West Indies) and Aleem Dar (Pakistan)
Player of the match: Imran Khalid (Islamabad United)

- Islamabad United won the toss and elected to field.

Match 17

14 February
21:00
Scorecard

Quetta Gladiators; 129 (18 overs)	v	Peshawar Zalmi; 130/2 (18.4 overs)
Grant Elliott 40 (29); Shahid Afridi 5/7 (4 overs)		Dawid Malan 60 (52); Zulfiqar Babar 1/21 (4 overs)

Peshawar won by 8 wickets
Sharjah Cricket Stadium, Sharjah
Umpires: Ahmed Shahab (Pakistan) and Shozab Raza (Pakistan)
Player of the match: Shahid Afridi (Peshawar Zalmi)

- Quetta Gladiators won the toss and elected to bat.
- The partnership of 63 runs between Grant Elliott and Zulfiqar Babar in this match was the highest 10th wicket partnership in T20s.

Match 18

16 February
21:00
Scorecard

Lahore Qalandars; 201/2 (20 overs)	v	Quetta Gladiators; 203/8 (20 overs)
Azhar Ali 61 (45); Grant Elliott 1/26 (4 overs)		Bismillah Khan 55 (30); Ehsan Adil 4/39 (4 overs)

Quetta won by 2 wickets
Dubai International Cricket Stadium, Dubai
Umpires: Joel Wilson (West Indies) and Aleem Dar (Pakistan)
Player of the match: Bismillah Khan (Quetta Gladiators)

- Quetta Gladiators won the toss and elected to field.

Match 19

17 February
16:30 (D/N)
Scorecard

Karachi Kings; 152/7 (20 overs)	v	Peshawar Zalmi; 158/5 (18.3 overs)
Lendl Simmons 49 (37); Darren Sammy 1/13 (2 overs)		Brad Hodge 85* (45); Bilawal Bhatti 2/36 (4 overs)

Peshawar won by 5 wickets
Dubai International Cricket Stadium, Dubai
Umpires: Ahsan Raza (Pakistan) and Shozab Raza (Pakistan)
Player of the match: Brad Hodge (Peshawar Zalmi)

- Karachi Kings won the toss and elected to bat.

Match 20

17 February
21:00
Scorecard

Lahore Qalandars; 150/5 (20 overs)	v	Islamabad United; 151/5 (19 overs)
Umar Akmal 72* (49); Mohammad Irfan 3/22 (4 overs)		Brad Haddin 54 (42); Zia ul Haq 2/38 (4 overs)

Islamabad won by 5 wickets
Dubai International Cricket Stadium, Dubai
Umpires: Joel Wilson (West Indies) and Aleem Dar (Pakistan)
Player of the match: Mohammad Irfan (Islamabad United)

- Islamabad United won the toss and elected to field.

== Playoff stage ==
All times are in Pakistan Standard Time (UTC+5).

Semifinals
19 February — Dubai
1	Peshawar Zalmi	132/9 (20 overs)
2	Quetta Gladiators	133 (19.3 overs)
20 February — Dubai
3	Islamabad United	115/1 (14.2 overs)
4	Karachi Kings	111/9 (20 overs)

Preliminary final
21 February — Dubai
QL	Peshawar Zalmi	126 (18 overs)
E1W	Islamabad United	176/3 (20 overs)

Final
23 February — Dubai
QW	Quetta Gladiators	174/7 (20 overs)
E2W	Islamabad United	175/4 (18.4 overs)

=== Qualifier ===
19 February
21:00
Scorecard

Quetta Gladiators; 133 (19.3 overs)	v	Peshawar Zalmi; 132/9 (20 overs)
Kevin Pietersen 53 (38); Wahab Riaz 3/17 (3.3 overs)		Darren Sammy 38 (29); Grant Elliott 3/19 (4 overs)

Quetta won by 1 run
Dubai International Cricket Stadium, Dubai
Umpires: Aleem Dar (Pakistan) and Shozab Raza (Pakistan)
Player of the match: Mohammad Nawaz (Quetta Gladiators)

- Peshawar Zalmi won the toss and elected to field.

=== Eliminator 1 ===
20 February
21:00
Scorecard

Karachi Kings; 111/9 (20 overs)	v	Islamabad United; 115/1 (14.2 overs)
Ravi Bopara 37 (36); Mohammad Sami 5/8 (4 overs)		Brad Haddin 52* (29); Sohail Khan 1/25 (3.2 overs)

Islamabad won by 9 wickets
Dubai International Cricket Stadium, Dubai
Umpires: Aleem Dar (Pakistan) and Ahsan Raza (Pakistan)
Player of the match: Mohammad Sami (Islamabad United)

- Islamabad United won the toss and elected to field.
- Shoaib Malik stepped down from captaincy of Karachi Kings a day before this match and Ravi Bopara was named his successor for the remainder of PSL 2016.
- Mohammad Sami reached 100 wickets in T20s in this match.
- As a result of this match Karachi Kings were eliminated.

=== Eliminator 2 ===
21 February
21:00
Scorecard

Islamabad United; 176/3 (20 overs)	v	Peshawar Zalmi; 126 (18 overs)
Sharjeel Khan 117 (62); Shaun Tait 2/34 (4 overs)		Kamran Akmal 45 (32); Imran Khalid 4/20 (3 overs)

Islamabad won by 50 runs
Dubai International Cricket Stadium, Dubai
Umpires: Joel Wilson (West Indies) and Aleem Dar (Pakistan)
Player of the match: Sharjeel Khan (Islamabad United)

- Peshawar Zalmi won the toss and elected to field.
- Sharjeel Khan scored the first ever century of PSL.

=== Final ===
23 February
21:00
Scorecard

Quetta Gladiators; 174/7 (20 overs)	v	Islamabad United; 175/4 (18.4 overs)
Ahmed Shehzad 64 (38); Andre Russell 3/36 (4 overs)		Dwayne Smith 73 (51); Nathan McCullum 1/25 (3 overs)

Islamabad won by 6 wickets
Dubai International Cricket Stadium, Dubai
Umpires: Joel Wilson (West Indies) and Aleem Dar (Pakistan)
Player of the match: Dwayne Smith (Islamabad United)

- Islamabad United won the toss and elected to field.
- Islamabad United won the first edition of PSL as the result of this match.

== Awards and statistics ==
The player of the tournament was Ravi Bopara of the Karachi Kings. Bopara scored 329 runs and took 11 wickets in the tournament. Andre Russell of Islamabad United took 16 wickets at an average of 17.25 to be the leading wicket-taker ahead of Wahab Riaz of Peshawar Zalmi with 15. Umar Akmal of Lahore Qalandars was the leading run scorer with 335 runs at an average of 83.75 and also took the most catches in the tournament with 7. Winners of the Spirit of Cricket award was Lahore Qalandars.

=== Most runs ===
Player	Team	Mat	Inns	Runs	Ave	SR	HS	100	50	4s	6s
Umar Akmal	Lahore Qalandars	7	7	335	83.75	157.27	93	0	4	27	17
Ravi Bopara	Karachi Kings	9	8	329	54.83	132.12	71*	0	2	21	11
Sharjeel Khan	Islamabad United	11	11	299	29.90	148.75	117	1	1	27	19
Ahmed Shehzad	Quetta Gladiators	10	10	290	29.00	143.56	71	0	2	36	8
Tamim Iqbal	Peshawar Zalmi	6	6	267	66.75	150.08	80*	0	3	24	5
Source: ESPNcricinfo.com.

=== Most wickets ===
Player	Team	Mat	Inns	Wkts	Ave	Econ	BBI	SR	4WI	5WI
Andre Russell	Islamabad United	10	10	16	17.25	8.02	3/18	12.8	0	0
Wahab Riaz	Peshawar Zalmi	9	9	15	16.33	7.13	3/17	13.7	0	0
Mohammad Nawaz	Quetta Gladiators	10	10	13	18.00	6.56	4/13	16.4	1	0
Mohammad Sami	Islamabad United	7	7	12	11.50	5.59	5/8	12.3	0	1
Grant Elliott	Quetta Gladiators	6	6	11	12.18	6.09	4/15	12.0	1	0
Source: ESPNcricinfo.com.

== See also ==
- Islamabad United in 2016
- Quetta Gladiators in 2016
- Peshawar Zalmi in 2016
- Karachi Kings in 2016
- Lahore Qalandars in 2016
