= 2016 Pakistan Super League final =

Tournament final

2016 Pakistan Super League Final
- Event: 2016 Pakistan Super League
| Quetta Gladiators | Islamabad United |
| Quetta Gladiators team colors | Islamabad United team colors |
| 174/7 | 175/4 |
| 20 overs | 18.4 overs |
- Islamabad United won by 6 wickets
- Date: 23 February 2016
- Venue: Dubai International Cricket Stadium, Dubai
- Player of the match: Dwayne Smith (Islamabad United)
- Umpires: Joel Wilson; Aleem Dar
- Attendance: 25,000

The 2016 Pakistan Super League Final was a Twenty20 cricket match played on 23 February 2016, at Dubai International Cricket Stadium, Dubai between Quetta Gladiators and Islamabad United to determine the winner of the 2016 season of the Pakistan Super League (PSL).

Islamabad defeated Quetta by six wickets to win their first PSL title. Islamabad won the toss at elected to field first. Dwayne Smith of Islamabad United was the man of the match, scoring 73 runs from 51 balls. The final was sold out with a final attendance of around 25,000. The final marked a successful culmination of PSL's first season.

== Route to the final ==
=== Group stage ===
Quetta Gladiators and Islamabad United finished the group stage in second and third positions respectively on the league's points table. Quetta won six out of their eight games in the group stage and finished second on the table with 12 points. Quetta batted second in seven of their matches and chased the tournament's highest total, 201 against Lahore Qalandars in their last group match. Islamabad began the tournament with four defeats in their first six matches, but won their last two group stage matches to qualify for the playoffs in third place with eight points.

League progression
| Team | Group matches | | | | | | | | Playoffs | | |
| Team | 1 | 2 | 3 | 4 | 5 | 6 | 7 | 8 | Q1/E | Q2 | F |
|---|---|---|---|---|---|---|---|---|---|---|---|
| Quetta Gladiators | 2 | 4 | 6 | 6 | 8 | 10 | 10 | 12 | W | | L |
| Islamabad United | 0 | 0 | 2 | 4 | 4 | 4 | 6 | 8 | W | W | W |

| Win | Loss | No result |

- Note: The total points at the end of each group match are listed.
- Note: Click on the points (group matches) or W/L (playoffs) to see the match summary.

==== Group stage series ====
4 February (D/N)
Match 1
Scorecard

| Islamabad United; 128/7 (20 overs) | v | Quetta Gladiators; 132/2 (16 overs) |

Quetta won by 8 wickets
Dubai International Cricket Stadium, Dubai

21 February (D/N)
Match 11
Scorecard

| Islamabad United; 117 (19.1 overs) | v | Quetta Gladiators; 118/3 (16.1 overs) |

Quetta won by 7 wickets
Sharjah Cricket Stadium, Sharjah

== Match ==
=== Background ===
The match was played at the Dubai International Cricket Stadium – the same venue at which the opening match of the league was also played between the two teams. Two days before the final all tickets were sold out.

=== Report ===
The toss was won by Islamabad who chose to bowl first. Their captain Misbah-ul-Haq explained the decision by stating that dew could develop later in the second innings of the game, making it harder to field last. Both teams were unchanged from their respective previous matches.

Quetta's innings began with opener Bismillah Khan being dismissed caught behind for 0 in the first over off Mohammad Irfan. Kevin Pietersen then joined the opener Ahmed Shehzad and was dismissed by Andre Russell after scoring a run-a-ball 18. Kumar Sangakkara and Ahmed Shehzad scored fifties to help the total to 174/7 in 20 overs. Andre Russell took three wickets and became the leading wicket taker of the tournament.

Islamabad started the chase with Dwayne Smith and Sharjeel Khan hitting consecutive boundaries off Anwar Ali. Sharjeel was dismissed by Nathan McCullum after scoring 12 runs from 11 balls. Brad Haddin joined the Smith and both scored fifties with Misbah ul Haq scoring the winning runs in the 19th over.

== Scorecard ==
Toss: Islamabad United won the toss and elected to bowl.

Quetta Gladiators innings
| Player | Status | Runs | Balls | 4s | 6s | Strike rate |
|---|---|---|---|---|---|---|
| Bismillah Khan | c Haddin b Irfan | 0 | 3 | 0 | 0 | 0.00 |
| Ahmed Shehzad | c Badree b Sami | 64 | 39 | 9 | 1 | 164.10 |
| Kevin Pietersen | c Asif Ali b Russell | 18 | 18 | 0 | 1 | 100.00 |
| Kumar Sangakkara | c Imran Khalid b Russell | 55 | 32 | 7 | 2 | 171.87 |
| Mohammad Nawaz | b Badree | 7 | 5 | 0 | 1 | 140.00 |
| †Sarfraz Ahmed | c Smith b Irfan | 3 | 4 | 0 | 0 | 75.00 |
| Grant Elliott | * | 12 | 9 | 0 | 1 | 133.33 |
| Anwar Ali | c Khalid b Russell | 13 | 10 | 1 | 1 | 130.00 |
| Nathan McCullum | * | 0 | 0 | 0 | 0 | 0.00 |
| Zulfiqar Babar | | | | | | |
| Aizaz Cheema | | | | | | |
| Extras (lb 2); Total 174–7 (20 overs) | | | | 17 | 7 | 8.7 RR |

Fall of wickets: 0–1 (Bismillah Khan, 0.3 ov), 33–2 (Pietersen, 5.1 ov), 120–3 (Sangakkara, 14.3 ov), 135–4 (Mohammad Nawaz, 15.4 ov), 147–5 (Ahmed Shehzad, 16.3 ov), 153–6 (†Sarfraz Ahmed, 17.4 ov), 168–7 (Anwar Ali, 19.4 ov)

Islamabad United bowling
| Bowler | Overs | Maidens | Runs | Wickets | Econ | Wides | NBs |
|---|---|---|---|---|---|---|---|
| Mohammad Irfan | 4 | 0 | 25 | 2 | 6.25 | 0 | 0 |
| Imran Khalid | 3 | 0 | 26 | 0 | 8.66 | 0 | 0 |
| Samuel Badree | 4 | 0 | 38 | 1 | 9.50 | 0 | 0 |
| Mohammad Sami | 4 | 0 | 31 | 1 | 7.75 | 0 | 0 |
| Andre Russell | 4 | 0 | 36 | 3 | 9.00 | 0 | 0 |
| Dwayne Smith | 1 | 0 | 16 | 0 | 16.00 | 0 | 0 |

Target: 175 runs from 20 overs at 8.75 RR

Islamabad United innings
| Player | Status | Runs | Balls | 4s | 6s | Strike rate |
|---|---|---|---|---|---|---|
| Dwayne Smith | c Pieterson b Zulfiqar | 74 | 51 | 7 | 4 | 143.13 |
| Sharjeel Khan | b McCullum | 12 | 11 | 1 | 1 | 102.09 |
| Brad Haddin | * | 61 | 39 | 2 | 5 | 156.41 |
| Andre Russell | b Cheema | 7 | 3 | 0 | 1 | 233.33 |
| Khalid Latif | c Zulfiqar b Anwar | 16 | 7 | 3 | 0 | 228.57 |
| †Misbah ul Haq | * | 1 | 1 | 0 | 0 | 100.00 |
| Asif Ali | | | | | | |
| Samuel Badree | | | | | | |
| Imran Khalid | | | | | | |
| Mohammad Irfan | | | | | | |
| Mohammad Sami | | | | | | |
| Extras (lb 5); Total 175–4 (18.4 overs) | | | | 13 | 11 | 9.37 RR |

Fall of wickets: 54–1 (Sharjeel Khan, 5.4 ov), 139–2 (Smith, 15.3 ov), 147–3 (Russell, 16.1 ov), 173–4 (Khalid Latif, 18.2 ov)

Quetta Gladiators bowling
| Bowler | Overs | Maidens | Runs | Wickets | Econ | Wides | NBs |
|---|---|---|---|---|---|---|---|
| Anwar Ali | 2.4 | 0 | 29 | 1 | 10.87 | 0 | 0 |
| Nathan McCullum | 3 | 0 | 24 | 1 | 8.00 | 0 | 0 |
| Aizaz Cheema | 4 | 0 | 34 | 1 | 8.50 | 0 | 0 |
| Zulfiqar Babar | 4 | 0 | 41 | 1 | 10.25 | 0 | 0 |
| Mohammad Nawaz | 3 | 0 | 15 | 0 | 5 | 0 | 0 |
| Grant Elliott | 2 | 0 | 27 | 0 | 13.50 | 0 | 0 |

Result: Islamabad United won by 6 wickets

== Match Officials ==
| Role | Name |
|---|---|
| On field umpire | Joel Wilson |
| On field umpire | Aleem Dar |
| TV umpire | Ahsan Raza |
| Reserve umpire | Ahmed Shahab |
| Match referee | Roshan Mahanama |

== Notes ==
- † indicates team captain
- * indicates not out
