= Muhammad Asghar =

Muhammad Asghar or Mohammad Asghar may refer to:

- Mohammad Asghar (cricketer) (born 1998)
- Mohammad Asghar (1945–2020), known as Oscar, Welsh politician
