= Pakistani cricket team in the West Indies in 2011 =

International cricket tour

| | Pakistan | West Indies |
- Dates: 18 April 2011 – 24 May 2011
| Captains | Shahid Afridi (ODI/T20I); Misbah-ul-Haq (Tests) | Darren Sammy |

Test series
- Result: 2-match series drawn 1–1
| Most runs | Misbah-ul-Haq (181) | Darren Bravo (107) |
| Most wickets | Saeed Ajmal (17) | Ravi Rampaul (11) |
- Player of the series: Saeed Ajmal (Pak)

One Day International series
- Results: Pakistan won the 5-match series 3–2
| Most runs | Mohammad Hafeez (267) | Lendl Simmons (279) |
| Most wickets | Wahab Riaz (7) | Devendra Bishoo (11) |
- Player of the series: Mohammad Hafeez (Pak)

Twenty20 International series
- Results: West Indies won the 1-match series 1–0
| Most runs | Umar Akmal (41) | Lendl Simmons (65) |
| Most wickets | Abdur Rehman (2); Saeed Ajmal (2); Wahab Riaz (2) | Devendra Bishoo (4) |
- Player of the series: Devendra Bishoo (WI)

The Pakistani cricket team toured the West Indies from 18 April to 24 May 2011. The tour consisted of two Tests, one Twenty20 International (T20I) and five One Day Internationals (ODIs).

== Squads ==
| Limited overs | | Tests | |
| Pakistan | West Indies | Pakistan | West Indies |
|---|---|---|---|
| Shahid Afridi (captain); Abdur Rehman; Ahmed Shehzad; Asad Shafiq; Hammad Azam; Junaid Khan; Misbah-ul-Haq; Mohammad Hafeez; Mohammad Salman; Sadaf Hussain; Saeed Ajmal; Tanvir Ahmed; Taufeeq Umar; Umar Akmal; Usman Salahuddin; Wahab Riaz | Darren Sammy (captain); Christopher Barnwell; Devendra Bishoo; Darren Bravo; Andre Fletcher; Danza Hyatt; Ashley Nurse; Ravi Rampaul; Kemar Roach; Andre Russell; Marlon Samuels; Krishmar Santokie; Lendl Simmons; Dwayne Bravo; Kirk Edwards; Anthony Martin; Devon Smith; Devon Thomas | Misbah-ul-Haq (captain); Abdur Rahman; Asad Shafiq; Azhar Ali; Hammad Azam; Junaid Khan; Mohammad Hafeez; Mohammad Salman; Saeed Ajmal; Tanvir Ahmed; Taufeeq Umar; Umar Akmal; Umar Gul; Wahab Riaz; Younis Khan | Darren Sammy (captain); Brendan Nash; Carlton Baugh; Devendra Bishoo; Darren Bravo; Shivnarine Chanderpaul; Fidel Edwards; Ravi Rampaul; Kemar Roach; Marlon Samuels; Ramnaresh Sarwan; Lendl Simmons; Devon Smith; Kraigg Brathwaite |

== Tour matches ==
18 April
Scorecard

| Pakistan; 287/8 (50 overs) | v | University of West Indies Vice Chancellor's XI; 219/8 (50 overs) |
| Mohammad Hafeez 101 (93); Carlos Brathwaite 3/38 (10 overs) | | Dwayne Bravo 63 (70); Abdur Rehman 4/27 (10 overs) |

Pakistan won by 68 runs
Mindoo Philip Park, Castries, Saint Lucia
Umpires: John Mathurin and Francis Maurice (both WI)

- Pakistan won the toss and elected to bat.

8–9 May
Scorecard

| Pakistanis | v | Guyana Board President's XI |
| 330/7d (75 overs); Misbah-ul-Haq 101* (132); Amir Khan 3/88 (26 overs) | | 252/6 (73 overs); Shemroy Barrington 58 (89); Saeed Ajmal 2/41 (15 overs) |

Match drawn
Bourda, Georgetown, Guyana
Umpires: Nigel Duguid (WI) and Clyde Duncan (WI)

- Pakistanis won the toss and elected to bat.

== T20I series ==
=== Only T20I ===
21 April
Scorecard

| West Indies; 150/7 (20 overs) | v | Pakistan; 143/9 (20 overs) |
| Lendl Simmons 65 (44); Abdur Rehman 2/22 (4 overs) | | Umar Akmal 41 (41); Devendra Bishoo 4/17 (4 overs) |

West Indies won by 7 runs
Beausejour Stadium, Gros Islet, Saint Lucia
Umpires: Norman Malcolm and Peter Nero (both WI)
Player of the match: Devendra Bishoo (WI)

- West Indies won the toss and elected to bat.
- Danza Hyatt, Christopher Barnwell, Andre Russell, Ashley Nurse, Devendra Bishoo (WI); Mohammad Salman and Junaid Khan (Pak) all made their T20I debuts.

== ODI series ==
=== 1st ODI ===
23 April
Scorecard

| West Indies; 221/6 (50 overs) | v | Pakistan; 222/2 (41.3 overs) |
| Darren Bravo 67 (109); Wahab Riaz 2/62 (10 overs) | | Misbah-ul-Haq 73* (90); Devendra Bishoo 2/48 (10 overs) |

Pakistan won by 8 wickets
Beausejour Stadium, Gros Islet, Saint Lucia
Umpires: Asoka de Silva (SL) and Norman Malcolm (WI)
Player of the match: Mohammad Hafeez (Pak)

- West Indies won the toss and elected to bat.
- Mohammad Salman, Hammad Azam and Junaid Khan (Pak) all made their ODI debuts.

=== 2nd ODI ===
25 April
Scorecard

| West Indies; 220 (50 overs) | v | Pakistan; 223/3 (48 overs) |
| Lendl Simmons 51 (48); Saeed Ajmal 2/23 (10 overs) | | Ahmed Shehzad 102 (148); Devendra Bishoo 2/36 (10 overs) |

Pakistan won by 7 wickets
Beausejour Stadium, Gros Islet, Saint Lucia
Umpires: Asoka de Silva (SL) and Norman Malcolm (WI)
Player of the match: Ahmed Shehzad (Pak)

- Pakistan won the toss and elected to field.
- Anthony Martin (WI) made his ODI debut.

=== 3rd ODI ===
28 April
Scorecard

| West Indies; 171 (43.4 overs) | v | Pakistan; 177/7 (40.1 overs) |
| Lendl Simmons 51 (64); Saeed Ajmal 3/29 (8.4 overs) | | Misbah-ul-Haq 62* (109); Ravi Rampaul 4/32 (9 overs) |

Pakistan won by 3 wickets
Kensington Oval, Bridgetown, Barbados
Umpires: Asoka de Silva (SL) and Peter Nero (WI)
Player of the match: Misbah-ul-Haq (Pak)

- Pakistan won the toss and elected to field.
- Match reduced to 45 overs per side due to rain.

=== 4th ODI ===
2 May
Scorecard

| Pakistan; 248/9 (50 overs) | v | West Indies; 154/4 (29.5 overs) |
| Mohammad Hafeez 121 (138); Devendra Bishoo 3/37 (10 overs) | | Lendl Simmons 76 (70); Junaid Khan 2/26 (6 overs) |

West Indies won by 1 run (D/L)
Kensington Oval, Bridgetown, Barbados
Umpires: Asoka de Silva (SL) and Peter Nero (WI)
Player of the match: Mohammad Hafeez (Pak)

- West Indies won the toss and elected to field.
- Rain reduced West Indies innings to 39 overs; their target was adjusted to 223 runs via the Duckworth–Lewis method. Further rain curtailed the innings after 29.5 overs, where the target was 153 runs.
- Usman Salahuddin and Tanvir Ahmed (Pak) both made their ODI debuts.

=== 5th ODI ===
5 May
Scorecard

| Pakistan; 139 (41.2 overs) | v | West Indies; 140/0 (23.3 overs) |
| Mohammad Hafeez 55 (83); Ravi Rampaul 4/45 (10 overs) | | Lendl Simmons 77* (73) |

West Indies won by 10 wickets
Providence Stadium, Guyana
Umpires: Asoka de Silva (SL) and Norman Malcolm (WI)
Player of the match: Lendl Simmons (WI)

- Pakistan won the toss and elected to bat.

== Test series ==
=== 1st Test ===
12–16 May
Scorecard

| West Indies | v | Pakistan |
| 226 (98 overs); Lendl Simmons 49 (130); Saeed Ajmal 5/69 (33 overs) | | 160 (64.4 overs); Abdur Rehman 40* (104); Devendra Bishoo 4/68 (25 overs) |
| 152 (61.5 overs); Shivnarine Chanderpaul 36* (127); Saeed Ajmal 6/42 (23.5 overs) | | 178 (73 overs); Misbah-ul-Haq 52 (162); Darren Sammy 5/29 (17 overs) |

West Indies won by 40 runs
Providence Stadium, Guyana
Umpires: Billy Bowden (NZ) and Tony Hill (NZ)
Player of the match: Darren Sammy (WI)

- West Indies won the toss and elected to bat.
- Devendra Bishoo (WI) and Mohammad Salman (Pak) both made their Test debuts.

=== 2nd Test ===
20–24 May
Scorecard

| Pakistan | v | West Indies |
| 272 (109.5 overs); Azhar Ali 67 (196); Ravi Rampaul 3/68 (26 overs) | | 223 (83.5 overs); Marlon Samuels 57 (124); Mohammad Hafeez 3/23 (8 overs) |
| 377/6d (112.2 overs); Taufeeq Umar 135 (314); Devendra Bishoo 2/149 (38 overs) | | 230 (80.3 overs); Darren Bravo 50 (144); Abdur Rehman 4/65 (24.3 overs) |

Pakistan won by 196 runs
Warner Park, Basseterre, Saint Kitts
Umpires: Billy Bowden (NZ) and Asoka de Silva (SL)
Player of the match: Taufeeq Umar (Pak)

- Pakistan won the toss and elected to bat.
- Rain and bad light reduced play on Day 1.
- Kraigg Brathwaite (WI) made his Test debut.
