= 2016 Karachi Kings season =

Cricket team in the Pakistan Super League

Karachi Kings
2016 season
- Coach: Mickey Arthur
- Captain: Shoaib Malik; Ravi Bopara (later)
- PSL 2016: 4th
- Most runs: Ravi Bopara (329)
- Most wickets: Ravi Bopara (11)

The Karachi Kings is a franchise cricket team that represents Karachi in the Pakistan Super League. They are one of the five teams that had a competition in the 2016 Pakistan Super League. The team was captained by Shoaib Malik and then by Ravi Bopara, and they stand on fourth position after winning just two matches from their eight matches in the PSL 2016.

== Background ==
Karachi Kings is a franchise cricket team representing Karachi, which plays in the PSL. In 2015, the Pakistan Cricket Board (PCB) announced that the inaugural season of the Pakistan Super League would take place in February 2016 in the United Arab Emirates. Team is owned by the ARY Group which bought it for US$26 Million for 10 years. It finished the inaugural season of PSL at fourth position.

=== Team anthem ===
Anthem for the team "Dilon Ke Hum Hain Badshah" was sung by Ali Azmat. It was released on 8 January 2016, and its music video was released on 30 January 2016.

== Squad ==
- Players with international caps before the start of the 2016 PSL season are listed in **bold**

Name	Nationality	Batting style	Bowling style	Notes
Batsmen
**Iftikhar Ahmed**	Pakistan	Right-handed	Right-arm off spin	
**Nauman Anwar**	Pakistan	Right-handed	Right-arm medium	Part-time wicket-keeper
**Lendl Simmons**	West Indies	Right-handed	Right-arm medium	Overseas
**Shahzaib Hasan**	Pakistan	Right-handed	Right-arm leg spin	
**Fawad Alam**	Pakistan	Left-handed	Slow Left-arm Orthodox	
**James Vince**	England	Right-handed	Right-arm medium	Overseas
**Owais Shah**	England	Right-handed	Right-arm off break	Overseas
All-rounders
**Imad Wasim**	Pakistan	Left-handed	Slow left-arm orthodox	
**Ravi Bopara**	England	Right-handed	Right-arm medium-fast	Captain/Overseas
**Shoaib Malik**	Pakistan	Right-handed	Right-arm off spin	Captain/Icon Player
**Tillakaratne Dilshan**	Sri Lanka	Right-handed	Right-arm off spin	Overseas
**Shakib Al Hasan**	Bangladesh	Left-handed	Slow left-arm orthodox	Overseas
**Bilawal Bhatti**	Pakistan	Right-handed	Right-arm fast	
**Ryan ten Doeschate**	Netherlands	Right-handed	Right-arm fast-medium	Overseas
**Sohail Tanvir**	Pakistan	Left-handed	Left-arm fast-medium	
Wicket-keepers
**Mushfiqur Rahim**	Bangladesh	Right-handed	—	Overseas
**Riki Wessels**	England	Right-handed	—	Overseas
Saifullah Bangash	Pakistan	Right-handed	—	
Bowlers
**Sohail Khan**	Pakistan	Right-handed	Right-arm fast	
**Mohammad Amir**	Pakistan	Left-handed	Left-arm fast	
Usama Mir	Pakistan	Right-handed	Right-arm Leg spin	
Mir Hamza	Pakistan	Right-handed	Left-arm medium fast	

Source: CricInfo

== Kit manufacturers and sponsors ==
Kit manufacturer	Shirt sponsor (chest)	Shirt sponsor (back)	Chest branding	Sleeve branding
AJ Sports	Bahria Town	Summit Bank	The Arkadians	Oye Hoye Chips, K-Electric, Shield, Igloo Ice-cream

Playing kit

== Season summary ==
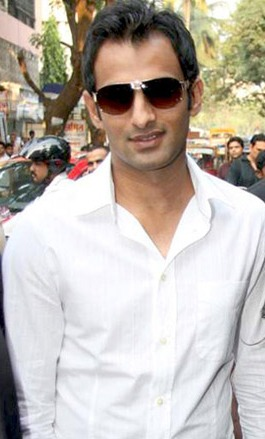
Shoaib Malik was the Captain of Karachi Kings in 2016 PSL Season

Shoaib Malik was the Captain of the Kings in 2016 Season. Kings during draft Day 1 and 2 picked international players like Shoaib Malik, Fawad Alam, Shakib Al Hasan, Ravi Bopara, Imad Wasim, Sohail Tanvir, Mohammad Amir, TM Dilshan, Lendl Simmons, Shahzaib Hasan, Sohail Khan, Bilawal Bhatti and Mushfiqur Rahim. Kings kicked off their campaign with an easy win against Lahore Qalandars at Dubai International Cricket Stadium due to Mohammad Amir's Hat-trick. Kings restricted Qalandars on 125 for 8 and won the match by 7 Wickets. They played their second match against Quetta Gladiators defeated Kings by eight wickets. Kings, while batting first set 148 run target. Kings failed to defend the target and lost with in 17th over of the game. The tournament does not went well for them as they lost six out of eight matches played finishing 4th however qualifying above Lahore Qalandars who won same number of matches but Kings having better net run rate qualified for the play-offs. Shoaib Malik stepped down from captaincy of Karachi Kings a day before this match and Ravi Bopara was named his successor. On 20 February 2016 they played a 2nd playoff - eliminator against Islamabad United things does not went well for them losing the toss sent into bat first by United they were restricted on the lowest score of the tournament (111). Ravi Bopara playing his first match as new Captain of the side was the highest run scorer he made 36 from 37. Disappointment followed them in the bowling as well as they could not stop United's batsmen scoring free runs and were easily crushed by nine wickets in the 15th over of the game only wicket-taker for the side was Sohail Khan as a result from this defeat they were eliminated from the tournament.

=== Season standings ===
Karachi Kings finished fourth in the points table of 2016 Pakistan Super League.

Pos	Team	Pld	W	L	NR	Pts	NRR
1	Peshawar Zalmi (3rd)	8	6	2	0	12	0.573
2	Quetta Gladiators (R)	8	6	2	0	12	0.216
3	Islamabad United (C)	8	4	4	0	8	−0.282
4	Karachi Kings (4th)	8	2	6	0	4	−0.036
5	Lahore Qalandars	8	2	6	0	4	−0.536

Source: Espncricinfo

=== Match log ===
No.	Date	Opponent	Venue	Result	Scorecard link
1	5 February	Lahore Qalandars	Dubai International Cricket Stadium	Won by 7 wickets	Scorecard
2	6 February	Quetta Gladiators	Dubai International Cricket Stadium	Lost by 8 wickets	Scorecard
3	7 February	Islamabad United	Dubai International Cricket Stadium	Lost by 2 runs	Scorecard
4	11 February	Peshawar Zalmi	Sharjah Cricket Stadium	Lost by 3 runs	Scorecard
5	12 February	Lahore Qalandars	Sharjah Cricket Stadium	Won by 27 runs	Scorecard
6	13 February	Quetta Gladiators	Sharjah Cricket Stadium	Lost by 5 wickets	Scorecard
7	14 February	Islamabad United	Sharjah Cricket Stadium	Lost by 5 wickets	Scorecard
8	17 February	Peshawar Zalmi	Dubai International Cricket Stadium	Lost by 5 wickets	Scorecard
9	20 February	Islamabad United (Eliminator)	Dubai International Cricket Stadium	Lost by 9 wickets	Scorecard
