= 2016 Lahore Qalandars season =

Cricket team in the Pakistan Super League

Lahore Qalandars
2016 season
- Coach: Paddy Upton
- Captain: Azhar Ali
- PSL 2016: 5th
- Most runs: Umar Akmal (335)
- Most wickets: Zafar Gohar (7)

The Lahore Qalandars is a franchise cricket team that represents Lahore in the Pakistan Super League. They are one of the five teams that had a competition in the 2016 Pakistan Super League. The team was captained by Azhar Ali, and they stand on fifth position after winning just two matches from their eight matches in the PSL 2016, as a result they were eliminated in group stage. Umar Akmal with 335 runs in 7 matches was leading run scorer of the tournament.

== Background ==
Lahore Qalandars is a franchise cricket team representing Lahore, which plays in the PSL. In 2015, the Pakistan Cricket Board (PCB) announced that the inaugural season of the Pakistan Super League would take place in February 2016 in the United Arab Emirates. Team is owned by the Qatar Lubricants Company. which bought it for US$25 Million for 10 years. It finished the inaugural season of PSL at fifth (last) position.

=== Team anthems ===
The anthem of the team "Dama Dam Mast" was released in two versions; one by Asrar and other by Nabeel Shaukat Ali.

== Squad ==
Players with international caps before the start of the season are listed in bold.

Name	Nationality	Batting style	Bowling style	Notes
Batsmen
**Mukhtar Ahmed**	Pakistan	Right-handed	Legbreak, googly	
**Azhar Ali**	Pakistan	Right-handed	Right-arm legbreak	Captain
**Chris Gayle**	West Indies	Left-handed	Right-arm offbreak	Overseas
Cameron Delport	South Africa	Left-handed	Right-arm medium	Overseas
**Umar Akmal**	Pakistan	Right-handed	Right-arm off-spin	
**Sohaib Maqsood**	Pakistan	Right-handed	Right-arm offbreak	
Naved Yasin	Pakistan	Left-handed	Slow left-arm orthodox	
Imran Butt	Pakistan	Right-handed	—	
All-rounders
**Abdul Razzaq**	Pakistan	Right-handed	Right-arm fast-medium	
**Hammad Azam**	Pakistan	Right-handed	Right-arm medium	
Zohaib Khan	Pakistan	Right-handed	Slow left-arm orthodox	
**Dwayne Bravo**	West Indies	Right-handed	Right-arm medium-fast	Overseas
Kevon Cooper	West Indies	Right-handed	Right-arm medium	Overseas
Wicket-keepers
**Mohammad Rizwan**	Pakistan	Right-handed	—	
Bowlers
**Ehsan Adil**	Pakistan	Right-handed	Right-arm fast-medium	
**Yasir Shah**	Pakistan	Right-handed	Right-arm leg-spin	
**Zafar Gohar**	Pakistan	Left-handed	Slow left-arm orthodox	
**Ajantha Mendis**	Sri Lanka	Left-handed	Right-arm off break	Overseas
Zia-ul-Haq	Pakistan	Right-handed	Left-arm fast-medium	
Adnan Rasool	Pakistan	Right-handed	Right-arm offbreak	
**Mustafizur Rahman**	Bangladesh	Left-handed	Left-arm medium-fast	Overseas

== Kit manufacturers and sponsors ==
Kit manufacturer	Shirt sponsor (chest)	Shirt sponsor (back)	Chest branding	Sleeve branding
Millat Sports	Jazz	Al-Karam Textiles	Geo News	QALCO, Mobilink

Playing kit

== Season summary ==
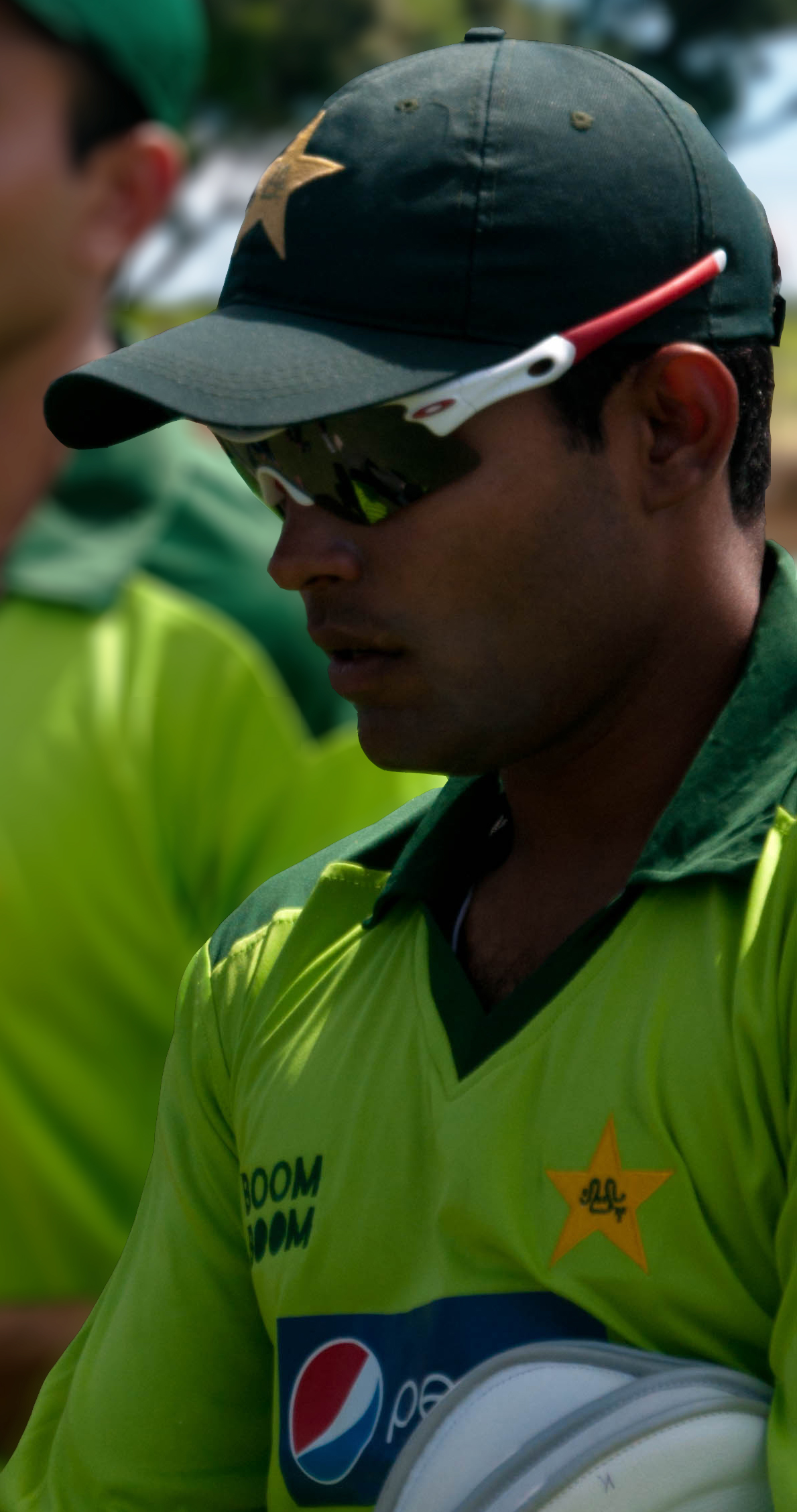
Umar Akmal was the team's star performer with 335 runs in 7 matches as well as Leading run scorer in 2016 Pakistan Super League season

Qalandars started their tournament with two consecutive losses against Karachi Kings and Peshawar Zalmi. On 5 February 2016, Qalandars played their first match against Karachi Kings losing by 7 wickets. While batting first they scored 125 for the loss of 8 wickets due to the first Hat-trick of PSL by Mohammad Amir. Mohammad Rizwan with 37 was the highest run scorer for Qalandars in this match. In reply they started well with early wickets but Shakib Al Hasan and Lendl Simmons took kings towards victory, hence losing by 7 wickets. In the second encounter against Peshawar Zalmi they again failed to taste success, this time posting 117 Dwayne Bravo with struggling 32 runs was the top scorer. Things went disappointing in bowling as well as they lost again this time by 9 wickets. They tasted first victory against Quetta Gladiators. Qalandar's losing the toss posting 194 thanks to Umar Akmal blistering innings of 93 from 40 balls, supported well by Cameron Delport he made 73 in reply Gladiators started well but felt short in the end by 63 runs thanks to Zafar Gohar's 4 for 13 Umar Akmal for his blistering inning and Fastest PSL fifty was awarded with Man of the match trophy.

In the second phase of the tournament, beginning in Sharjah and their next match was against Islamabad United played at Sharjah Cricket Association Stadium Qalandars scored 166 runs after being sent in to bat first. Muhammad Rizwan scored 50 off 27 balls. Defending 167 their bowling let them down as they were easily crushed after managing to get only two wickets. They played their fifth match of the tournament against Karachi Kings. Stand-in captain Dwayne Bravo winning the toss put Kings into bat. Kings responded well by posting a good total (177) on the board. Zafar Gohar was the standout bowler for Qalandars as he took 3 for 26. Qalandars started the chase slowly but getting the momentum back with some quick runs between 6 and 10 overs. But both their openers Chris Gayle and Cameron Delport after making 38 and 55 respectively got out in quick succession. The last 10 overs belonged to Kings as King's Ravi Bopara changed the whole complexion of the match by taking 6 wickets for just 16 runs in the end beating Qalandars by 27 runs. They won their second match of this season against Peshawar Zalmi which was a close match. Qalandars batting first gave 165 runs target. Cameron Delport was the team's highest run-scorer with 78; in response Zalmi started well but lost their way a little, hence Qalandars won the match by 4 runs. Delport with 78 off 61 balls and with 3 for 18 was awarded man of the match. In their match against the Gladiators, Saw Qalandars batted first after being sent into bat first by opposition captain Sarfraz Ahmed posted 201 (highest score of the tournament) thanks largely to captain Azhar Ali's 61 off 45 balls and Chris Gayle's 60 off 34 balls followed by the blistering innings from players like Umar Akmal and Dwayne Bravo. In reply Quetta's Bismillah Khan, who was playing his debut innings in PSL scored 55 from 30 and Mohammad Nabi whose 30 from 12 finished the game on the last ball of the match, were pivotal in the victory and hence Qalandars lost the match by 2 wickets. In their last group stage match a do or die match for Qalandars they started badly losing 3 wickets with less than 5 runs but excellent innings from Sohaib Maqsood and Umar Akmal saw team posting more than 150 but again their inexperienced bowling couldn't defend the target, losing by 5 wickets. They managed to win only two matches in the end first against Quetta Gladiators and then against Peshawar Zalmi losing six out of their eight matches. Qalandars finished the league 5th on points table and did not qualify for playoffs. Despite playing only 7 games Umar Akmal was the highest run scorer of the tournament won the Best Batsman of the League's award after scoring (335) runs with 4 fifties. At the final Qalandars were given Spirt of The Game award.

=== Season standings ===
Pos	Team	Pld	W	L	NR	Pts	NRR
1	Peshawar Zalmi (3rd)	8	6	2	0	12	0.573
2	Quetta Gladiators (R)	8	6	2	0	12	0.216
3	Islamabad United (C)	8	4	4	0	8	−0.282
4	Karachi Kings (4th)	8	2	6	0	4	−0.036
5	Lahore Qalandars	8	2	6	0	4	−0.536

Source: Espncricinfo

=== Match log ===
Match	Date	Opponent	Venue	Result	Scorecard
1	5 February	Karachi Kings	Dubai International Cricket Stadium	Lost by 7 wickets	Scorecard
2	6 February	Peshawar Zalmi	Dubai International Cricket Stadium	Lost by 9 wickets	Scorecard
3	8 February	Quetta Gladiators	Dubai International Cricket Stadium	Won by 63 runs	Scorecard
4	10 February	Islamabad United	Sharjah Cricket Stadium	Lost by 8 wickets	Scorecard
5	12 February	Karachi Kings	Sharjah Cricket Stadium	Lost by 27 runs	Scorecard
6	13 February	Peshawar Zalmi	Sharjah Cricket Stadium	Won by 4 runs	Scorecard
7	16 February	Quetta Gladiators	Dubai International Cricket Stadium	Lost by 2 wickets	Scorecard
8	17 February	Islamabad United	Dubai International Cricket Stadium	Lost by 5 wickets	Scorecard
