= 2016 Islamabad United season =

Pakistani franchise cricket team

Islamabad United
2016 season
- Coach: Dean Jones
- Captain: Misbah ul Haq
- PSL 2016: Champions
- Most runs: Sharjeel Khan (299)
- Most wickets: Andre Russell (16)

Islamabad United in 2016 was one of the five original teams that played in the inaugural season of the Pakistan Super League, a franchise-based Twenty20 cricket competition held in the United Arab Emirates. The team won the 2016 competition after finishing third in the group stage and qualifying for the play off rounds.

== Background ==
Islamabad United is a franchise cricket team which nominally represents the capital city of Pakistan, Islamabad. The team plays in the Pakistan Super League which, in 206, took place in the United Arab Emirates. The franchise is owned by Leonine Global Sports, a UAE-based company, which bought it for US$15 million for a 10-year period in 2015.

=== Team anthem ===
The 2016 team anthem, Chakka Choka, was written, composed and sung by Ali Zafar. It was released on 30 January 2016 with a music video released on 8 February 2016.

== Squad ==
- Players with international caps before the start of the 2016 PSL season are listed in **bold**.

Name	Nationality	Batting style	Bowling style	Notes
Batsmen
**Sharjeel Khan**	Pakistan	Left-handed	Right-arm leg spin	
**Babar Azam**	Pakistan	Right-handed	Right-arm off spin	
**Misbah-ul-Haq**	Pakistan	Right-handed	Right-arm leg spin	Captain
**Khalid Latif**	Pakistan	Right-handed	Right-arm off spin	
Hussain Talat	Pakistan	Left-handed	Right-arm medium	
Umar Siddiq	Pakistan	Left-handed	Right-arm off spin	
Asif Ali	Pakistan	Right-handed	Right-arm medium-fast	
All-Rounders
**Shane Watson**	Australia	Right-handed	Right-arm fast-medium	
**Azhar Mahmood**	Pakistan	Right-handed	Right-arm fast-medium	
Ashar Zaidi	Pakistan	Left-handed	Left-arm orthodox spin	
Kamran Ghulam	Pakistan	Right-handed	Left-arm orthodox spin	
Imran Khalid	Pakistan	Left-handed	Left-arm orthodox spin	
**Umar Amin**	Pakistan	Left-handed	Right-arm medium	
**Dwayne Smith**	West Indies	Right-handed	Right-arm medium	Overseas
**Andre Russell**	West Indies	Right-handed	Right-arm fast	Overseas
Wicket-keepers
**Sam Billings**	England	Right-handed	—	Overseas
**Brad Haddin**	Australia	Right-handed	—	Overseas
Bowlers
**Saeed Ajmal**	Pakistan	Right-handed	Right-arm off spin	
**Mohammad Irfan**	Pakistan	Right-handed	Left-arm fast	
**Mohammad Sami**	Pakistan	Right-handed	Right-arm fast	
**Samuel Badree**	West Indies	Right-handed	Right-arm leg spin	Overseas
Rumman Raees	Pakistan	Right-handed	Left-arm medium-fast	
Amad Butt	Pakistan	Right-handed	Right-arm fast	

== Kit manufacturers and sponsors ==
Shirt sponsor (chest)	Shirt sponsor (back)	Chest branding	Sleeve branding
Dostea		Dunya News	Dostea

Playing kit

== Season summary ==
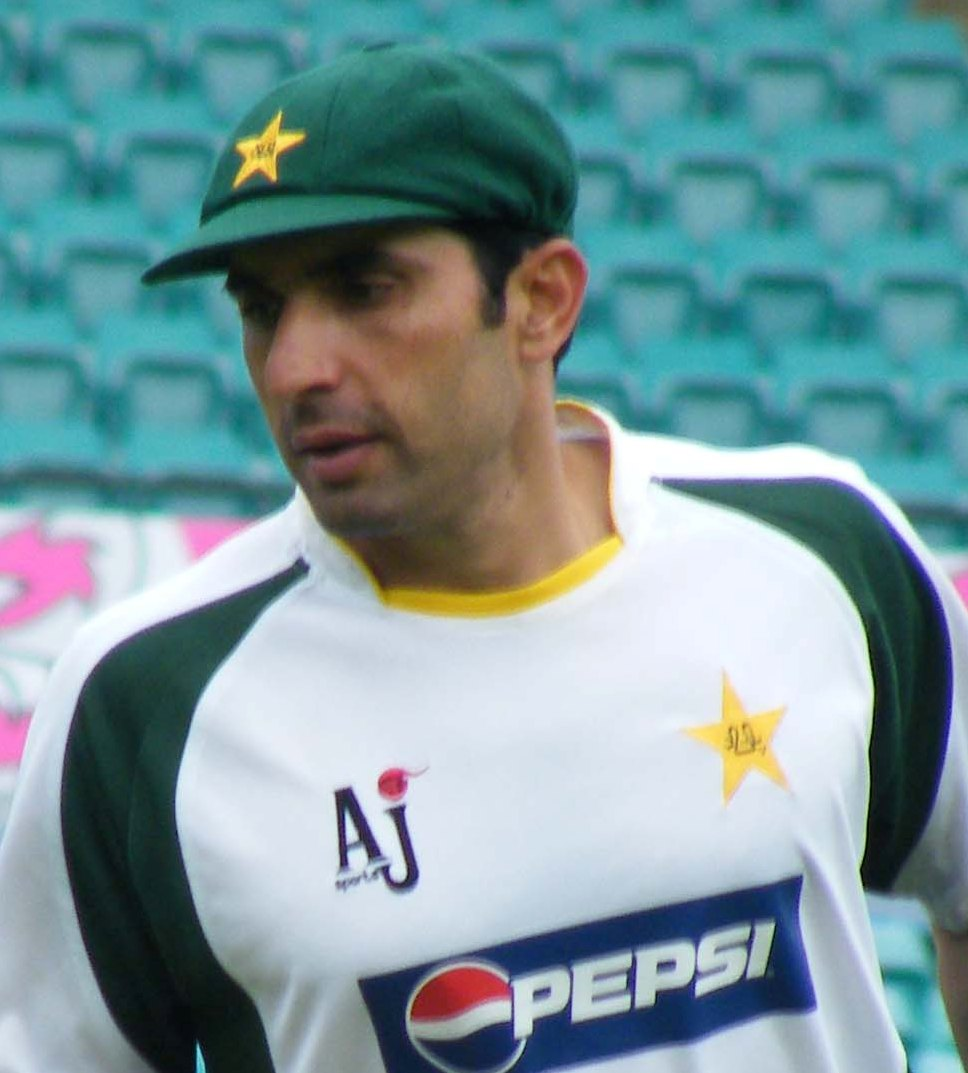
Misbah ul Haq is the Captain of Islamabad United

After a poor start to the 2016 Pakistan Super League tournament Islamabad United finished third in the round robin group stage, qualifying for the knock out stage of the tournament. The team won four matches out of eight, finishing with eight points from their group games.

They faced fourth placed Karachi Kings in the eliminator, winning by nine wickets thanks to Mohammad Sami's man of the match performance of five wickets for eight runs from four overs. Brad Haddin and Dwayne Smith each scored fifties as United achieved their target of111 in the 15th over.

In the second qualifier match Islamabad met Peshawar Zalmi. Sharjeel Khan scored 117 from 62 balls, the first century scored in the Pakistan Super League. It proved to be the difference between the teams as United posted 176 for 3 and Zalmi were bowled out for 126 with two full overs to go. United, spinner Imran Khalid took four wickets for 20 runs and Andre Russell three for 37. The win took United through to the final against Quetta Gladiators.

The 2016 Pakistan Super League Final was won by Islamabed by six wickets. United opted to bowl first after winning the toss and the Gladiators scored 174–7 in their 20 overs. Andre Russell, who finished the tournament as the leading wicket-taker, took three for 37. In reply United started well with Dwayne Smith scoring 73 runs and Brad Haddin with an unbeaten 61, allowing United to score 174 for four with eight balls remaining and winning the title alongside Cash Price of $500,000.

=== Matches ===
No.	Date	Opponent	Venue	Result	Scorecard link
1	4 February	Quetta Gladiators	Dubai International Cricket Stadium	Lost by 8 wickets	Scorecard
2	5 February	Peshawar Zalmi	Dubai International Cricket Stadium	Lost by 24 runs	Scorecard
3	7 February	Karachi Kings	Dubai International Cricket Stadium	Won by 2 runs	Scorecard
4	10 February	Lahore Qalandars	Sharjah Cricket Stadium	Won by 8 wickets	Scorecard
5	11 February	Quetta Gladiators	Sharjah Cricket Stadium	Lost by 7 wickets	Scorecard
6	12 February	Peshawar Zalmi	Sharjah Cricket Stadium	Lost by 7 wickets	Scorecard
7	14 February	Karachi Kings	Sharjah Cricket Stadium	Won by 5 wickets	Scorecard
8	17 February	Lahore Qalandars	Dubai International Cricket Stadium	Won by 5 wickets	Scorecard
9	20 February	Karachi Kings(Eliminator)	Dubai International Cricket Stadium	Won by 9 wickets	Scorecard
10	21 February	Peshawar Zalmi (Qualifier 2)	Dubai International Cricket Stadium	Won by 50 run	Scorecard
11	23 February	Quetta Gladiators (Final)	Dubai International Cricket Stadium	Won by 6 wickets	Scorecard
