= Grant Elliott =

New Zealand cricketer

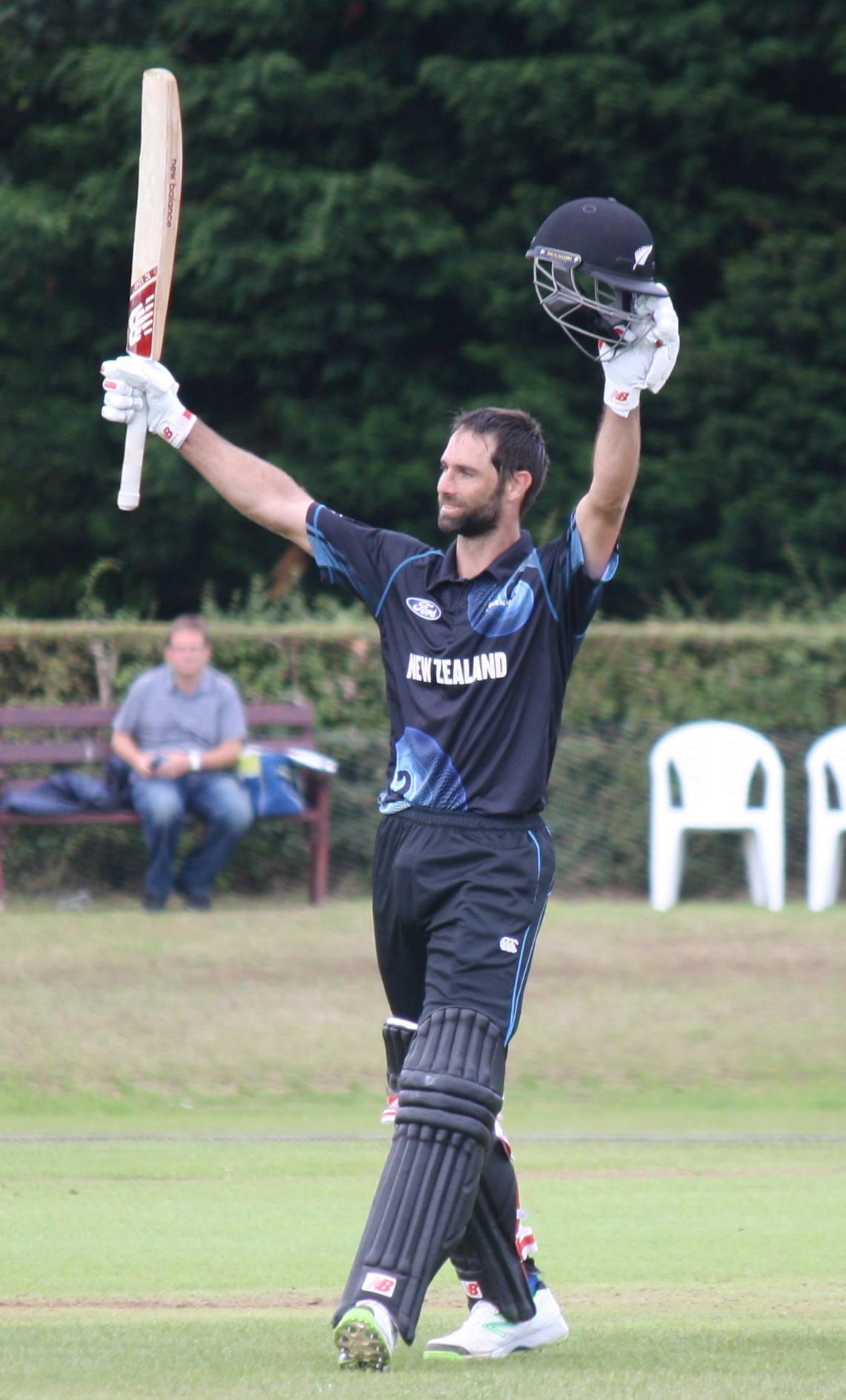
- Elliott in 2014

Personal information
- Full name: Grant David Elliott
- Born: 21 March 1979 (age 47); Johannesburg, Transvaal, South Africa
- Nickname: Shunt, Magic, Hairy Javelin
- Height: 6 ft 2 in (1.88 m)
- Batting: Right-handed
- Bowling: Right-arm medium, occasional off spin and leg spin
- Role: All-rounder

International information
- National sides: New Zealand (2008–2016); World XI (2017)
- Test debut (cap 236): 22 March 2008; New Zealand v England
- Last Test: 3 December 2009; New Zealand v Pakistan
- ODI debut (cap 150): 18 June 2008; New Zealand v England
- Last ODI: 8 February 2016; New Zealand v Australia
- ODI shirt no.: 88
- T20I debut (cap 36): 15 February 2009; New Zealand v Australia
- Last T20I: 12 September 2017; World XI v Pakistan

Domestic team information
- Years: Team
- 1996/97: Transvaal B
- 1998/99: Gauteng
- 1999/00–2000/01: Griqualand West
- 2001/02–2002/03: Gauteng
- 2005/06–2016/17: Wellington (squad no. 44)
- 2009: Surrey
- 2015: Leicestershire
- 2016: Quetta Gladiators
- 2016: St Lucia Zouks
- 2016: Chittagong Vikings
- 2017: Lahore Qalandars (squad no. 88)
- 2017–2018: Warwickshire (squad no. 88)

Career statistics
Competition	Test	ODI	FC	LA
Matches	5	83	83	211
Runs scored	86	1,976	3,883	5,126
Batting average	10.75	34.06	30.57	33.50
100s/50s	0/0	2/11	8/20	7/28
Top score	25	115	196*	115
Balls bowled	282	1,302	7,216	4,827
Wickets	4	39	92	130
Bowling average	35.00	30.23	36.71	33.36
5 wickets in innings	0	0	1	1
10 wickets in match	0	0	0	0
Best bowling	2/8	4/31	5/33	5/34
Catches/stumpings	2/–	17/–	46/–	70/–
Medal record
Men's Cricket
Representing New Zealand
ICC Cricket World Cup
Runner-up	2015 Australia and New Zealand
ICC Champions Trophy
Runner-up	2009 South Africa
- Source: ESPNcricinfo, 13 January 2019

Grant David Elliott (born 21 March 1979) is a former New Zealand cricketer, who played all formats of the game. Primarily a batting all-rounder, Elliott contributed a man of the match performance to provide entrance to New Zealand's first ever World Cup final, by beating South Africa in 2015. Domestically, he played for Wellington. He was also a part of the New Zealand squad to finish as runners-up at the 2015 Cricket World Cup.

In March 2017, he announced his retirement from international cricket and in August 2018, he retired from all forms of cricket.

== Early life ==
The son of a South African plastic surgeon, Grant Elliott attended St Stithians College, whose notable cricketing alumni include Michael Lumb, Roy Pienaar, David Terbrugge, Dave Rundle and Kagiso Rabada.

=== South Africa ===
He debuted with 67 in 1996–97 at Gauteng, where on the advice of his captain, former New Zealand test skipper Ken Rutherford, who saw the quota system possibly blocking his path to higher honours, Elliott left his native Johannesburg for New Zealand in 2001. He played one match for South Africa 'A' against India 'A' before he qualified to play for New Zealand in 2007.

== International career ==
Called up to the national team in early 2008 during England's tour, he made his Test debut against England in the third test in Napier replacing Jacob Oram.

Elliott went on to also make his ODI debut for New Zealand against England taking 3 wickets. In his second game, he scored his maiden ODI fifty. His maiden ODI century was in the 3rd game of the Chappell-Hadlee series scoring 115 against Australia at the SCG on Sunday 8 February 2009.

He also did well in the Champions trophy in South Africa in 2009 as he took a four wicket haul against England at the Wanderers which actually helped New Zealand to qualify for the semifinals and in the semifinals he played an innings of 75 not out to take the Black caps to victory against Pakistan.

=== World records ===
Elliott scored his second ODI century when Sri Lanka toured New Zealand prior to the 2015 Cricket World Cup. Elliott and Luke Ronchi both broke several batting records as the pair lifted New Zealand from 93/5 to a commanding 360 off their 50 overs. Their stand of 267* is the highest 6th wicket partnership in ODIs.

In the inaugural Pakistan Super League in 2016 he along with Zulfiqar Babar set the highest 10th wicket partnership in any forms of T20 (63).

=== 2015 World Cup ===
His finest moment however came in the 2015 World Cup Semi final against South Africa where he scored an unbeaten 84 and was adjudged the Man of the Match. He hit the winning six off the second to last ball of the innings from Dale Steyn and created history by putting New Zealand into their first ever Cricket World Cup Final. In the final against Australia, Elliot top-scored for New Zealand, scoring 83 runs.

After the World Cup, Elliott was named in the Twenty20 side in 2016 after suffering an arm injury playing domestically for Wellington.

In April 2016, Elliott announced his retirement from ODI cricket.

In August 2017, he was named in a World XI side to play three Twenty20 International matches against Pakistan in the 2017 Independence Cup in Lahore.

== Strengths ==
Early on, Ken Rutherford noted his strong batting technique while also noting his occasional lack of self-belief. Former coach of the Wellington Firebirds, Anthony Stuart, commented that was "a tough cookie", and praised his commitment and high work ethic. Glenn Turner, former convener of the national selection panel, considered Elliott a "thoughtful character" whose offside play was exceptional, such as his hallmark shot, the lofted drive over extra cover.

== Other ==
He played for Weybridge Cricket Club in the Surrey Championship in 2008.

Elliott is the maker of the Buzz Cricket Bat. It is used by himself, Dewayne Bowden, Mark Houghton, Leighton Morgan, Chris Nevin and Luke Woodcock. Luke Woodcock scored 220 with it in a first-class game. Since he has been injured he has worked with Sky Sport in the 2010 HRV Cup.

In 2015, Elliott worked part-time as a business development manager.

He currently works as a partnership manager for Life Flight. Previously he worked full-time for cricHQ as a General Manager. He is also a cricket commentator for TVNZ and SENZ. His international shirt number has now passed to fellow ex-pat Black Cap - Devon Conway.
