= Zulfiqar Babar =

Pakistani former cricketer

Personal information
- Born: 10 December 1978 (age 47); Okara, Punjab, Pakistan
- Batting: Right-handed
- Bowling: Slow left-arm orthodox
- Role: Bowler

International information
- National side: Pakistan (2013–2016)
- Test debut (cap 215): 14–17 October 2013 v South Africa
- Last Test: Oct 30 - Nov 3 2016 v West Indies
- ODI debut (cap 198): 7 October 2014 v Australia
- Last ODI: 22 April 2015 v Bangladesh
- T20I debut (cap 52): 27 July 2013 v West Indies
- Last T20I: 1 April 2014 v West Indies
- T20I shirt no.: 78

Domestic team information
- Years: Team
- 2004–Present: Water and Power Development Authority
- 2005–2010 & 2013-2015: Multan Tigers
- 2011–2012: Quetta Bears
- 2016–2017: Quetta Gladiators (squad no. 78)
- 2018: Karachi Kings

Career statistics
Competition	Tests	ODI	FC	LA
Matches	15	5	101	91
Runs scored	144	35	1,902	628
Batting average	16.00	17.50	16.53	19.03
100s/50s	0/1	0/0	0/7	0/1
Top score	56	14*	89	52 *
Balls bowled	4,478	294	23,971	4,784
Wickets	54	4	476	114
Bowling average	39.42	61.50	23.05	31.08
5 wickets in innings	2	0	31	2
10 wickets in match	0	0	5	0
Best bowling	5/74	2/52	10/143	6/10
Catches/stumpings	4/-	0/-	40/–	23/–
- Source: ESPNcricinfo, 21 March 2018

Zulfiqar Babar (born 10 December 1978) is a Pakistani former cricketer who played for the Pakistan national cricket team from 2013 to 2016.

== Domestic career ==
Despite not breaking through to the national team earlier, Babar made sure his name was always in the reckoning by consistently being among the wickets in domestic cricket.

In the 2009/10 Quaid-i-Azam Trophy, he took 69 wickets at 16.42. A national call-up come when he took 93 first-class wickets in 13 games in the 2012/13 season, at an average of 17.04.

He sealed his case when he took 6 for 22 in a practice game between Pakistan Chief Ministers XI and Pakistan Cricket Board Chairman's XI in October 2013.

In the inaugural Pakistan Super League in 2016 he along with Grant Elliot set the highest 10th wicket partnership (63) in any form of T20. He was the leading wicket-taker for Water and Power Development Authority in the 2018–19 Quaid-e-Azam Trophy, with thirty-one dismissals in six matches.

== International career ==
Babar made his T20I debut on 27 July 2013, against West Indies, being one of the oldest Pakistani players to do so, aged 34 years 229 days.

Although Babar is Pakistan's second oldest T20 debutant after Inzamam-ul-Haq, who was 36 years 178 days, he was unfazed. He says, "I always leave such matters in the hands of Allah. Perhaps, it was my destiny to be playing for Pakistan at a time when people would be seriously considering other options in life."

He picked up 3 for 23 and was the highest wicket-taker for his team in the game. He also scored an invaluable 13* off 17 balls, and hit a six off the last ball of the innings to guide his team to a 2-wicket victory. He also scored 11* off 6 balls in the next game and picked up 2 more wickets for 37. He was the highest wicket-taker in the series and was named Man of the Series in his debut series.

Babar was named to the Test squad to play against South Africa in UAE in October 2013. He was chosen ahead of the regular spin bowler cricketer at Abu Dhabi Test.

He took 3 wickets of JP Duminy, Faf du Plessis and Robin Peterson in the first innings and took wickets of Hashim Amla and Dale Steyn in the second Innings showing his spinning abilities helped Pakistan to win the match by seven wickets.

He was selected in Pakistan's World Cup squad for World T20 2014. Against the match vs Australia, he took the wickets of David Warner and Shane Watson in the 1st over thus "Piling the dead bodies of Australia". Pakistan managed to win that match by 16 runs.

He made his One Day International debut for Pakistan against Australia in the United Arab Emirates on 7 October 2014.

== Personal life ==
Babar hails from Okara, a small town 85 miles away from Lahore and is the first from the town to play for Pakistan in 65 years.

Babar is the son of former Pakistani international footballer, Abdul Ghaffar, who played one game for Pakistan. Babar says his father never forced him to play soccer, knowing his son's passion for cricket. Babar has two grandsons with an interest in cricket.
