= Wahab Riaz =

Pakistani cricketer (born 1985)

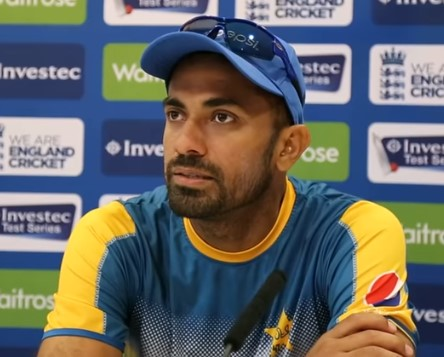
- Wahab in 2017

Chief Selector of Pakistan national cricket team
- In office 17 November 2023 – 10 July 2024
- Preceded by: Inzamam-ul-Haq

Advisor to the Chief Minister of Punjab for Sports and Youth Affairs
- In office 22 March 2023 – 27 February 2024

Personal details
- Born: 28 June 1985 (age 41) Lahore, Punjab, Pakistan
- Height: 6 ft 2 in (188 cm)
- Nickname: Viki
- Cricket career

Cricket information
- Batting: Right-handed
- Bowling: Left-arm fast
- Role: Bowler

International information
- National side: Pakistan (2008–2020)
- Test debut (cap 202): 18 August 2010 v England
- Last Test: 7 October 2018 v Australia
- ODI debut (cap 174): 2 February 2008 v Zimbabwe
- Last ODI: 3 November 2020 v Zimbabwe
- ODI shirt no.: 47
- T20I debut (cap 24): 20 April 2008 v Bangladesh
- Last T20I: 20 December 2020 v New Zealand
- T20I shirt no.: 47

Domestic team information
- Years: Team
- 2001/02–2018/19: Lahore (Note: Only clubs that Wahab has played for in more than one season are included in this list.)
- 2003/04–2004/05: Hyderabad
- 2006/07–2014/15: National Bank of Pakistan
- 2006/07–2014/15: Punjab
- 2016–2023: Peshawar Zalmi
- 2017–2018: Barbados Tridents
- 2017/18–2018/19: WAPDA
- 2018/19–2020/21: Khyber Pakhtunkhwa
- 2021: Trent Rockets
- 2021/22–2022/23: Central Punjab

Career statistics
Competition	Test	ODI	FC	LA
Matches	27	91	136	191
Runs scored	306	740	2,675	1,470
Batting average	8.50	14.50	16.51	16.33
100s/50s	0/0	0/3	0/10	0/5
Top score	39	54*	84	77
Balls bowled	5,018	4,327	23,328	8,917
Wickets	83	120	441	260
Bowling average	34.50	34.30	29.13	30.81
5 wickets in innings	2	1	16	5
10 wickets in match	0	0	5	0
Best bowling	5/63	5/46	9/59	5/24
Catches/stumpings	5/–	29/–	41/–	59/–
Medal record
Men's cricket
Representing Pakistan
ICC Champions Trophy
Gold medal – first place	2017 England & Wales
U19 World Cup
Winner	2004 Bangladesh

Wahab Riaz (Urdu: وہاب ریاض; born 28 June 1985) is a Pakistani former cricketer and cricket administrator who was chief selector of Pakistan national cricket team from November 2023 to July 2024.

Riaz was a left-arm fast bowler and a right-handed batsman. He frequently bowled at speeds of around 90 mph (144.8 km/h) and had reached 96 miles per hour (154 km/h). His all round performance in ICC Cricket World Cup 2015 earned him worldwide recognition. In August 2018, he was one of 33 players to be awarded a central contract for the 2018–19 season by the Pakistan Cricket Board (PCB). In September 2019, Riaz announced that he would be taking a break from red-ball cricket to focus on the shorter formats of the game. He also served as an advisor to the chief minister of Punjab for sports and youth affairs, in the caretaker government headed by Mohsin Raza Naqvi.

== Early life and family ==
Wahab Riaz was born on 28 June 1985 to businessman Sheikh Sikandar Riaz. He was born into a Muslim Gujjar family, originally hailing from Gujrat, Punjab. He studied at Aitchison College, Lahore. He later earned his M.Sc in Biotechnology from the University of the Punjab, Lahore.

He is married to Zainab Chaudhary. They have three children.

== Cricket career ==
At Aitchison College, Riaz used to play as a wicket-keeper and opening batsman.

In 2002, Riaz made his first-class debut at the age of 16 for Lahore Whites. He was then part of the 2004 Under-19 Cricket World Cup, which Pakistan won.

During the 2007–08 domestic season, Riaz finished as the second-highest wicket-taker, which earned him a place in the One Day International (ODI) series against Zimbabwe in February 2008. Later, in June 2008, Riaz was chosen in Pakistan's T20I squad for the tri-series in Bangladesh which also included India. In his first match against Bangladesh, he finished with 3 wickets for 22 runs in 7 overs. In the next match against India, he took two wickets while conceding 85 runs.

Riaz made his Test debut against England in the third Test of the 2010 series. England batted first and Riaz took 5/63 in the first innings. In Pakistan's first innings, he batted at number 3 and scored 27 runs.

Riaz next played for Pakistan in the Test series against South Africa in October 2010 after he participated in 4 ODIs. He was selected to play in the first Test later in that series. He took the wickets of Graeme Smith and Hashim Amla before suffering a side strain later that day and was later ruled out from the test series.

In March 2011, Riaz appeared for Pakistan for four matches. He performed notably, taking 5 wickets in the Pakistan vs India semi-final of the 2011 Cricket World Cup, where he appeared as a replacement for Shoaib Akhtar.

Shortly after the World Cup, Pakistan toured the West Indies for two Tests, five ODIs, and a T20I; Riaz was included in the squad. He took two wickets in the T20I, in a losing effort, and played in four out of the five ODIs, taking seven wickets at an average of 25.28 and finishing as Pakistan's leading wicket-taker in the series. In a report to the Pakistan Cricket Board (PCB) on the team's performance in the West Indies, coach Waqar Younis commented that Riaz had an "average" tour. In May Pakistan toured Ireland for a two-match ODI series, and although Riaz was included in the squad he did not play a match.

After the tour of Ireland, Riaz entered talks with Kent, eventually signing to play for them in county cricket. The club had suffered injuries to their fast bowlers and Riaz was drafted in to bolster their line up. He made his T20 debut for Kent against Glamorgan on 11 June. He took Chris Cooke's wicket, and guided his team to victory with a final batting score of 32 not out, hitting the winning runs after being sent in up the order. On his home debut Riaz took a hat-trick – dismissing Chris Taylor, Ed Young, and Richard Coughtrie – and recording figures of 5 wickets for 17 runs (5/17) against Gloucestershire to help his team to an eight-wicket victory. It was the second time a player had taken a T20 hat-trick for Kent, and was the first time Riaz took five wickets in the format, beating previous best bowling figures of 3/14. During his spell with Kent Riaz took 13 first-class wickets at an average of 33.53, 9 in list A cricket at 13.33, and 20 wickets in t20 matches at an average of 19.85.

In August, Riaz was awarded a category B central contract with the PCB; six players were in category A, eight (including Riaz) in B, and nine in C. When Pakistan toured Zimbabwe in September, Riaz was rested with the selectors taking the opportunity to blood a number of new and inexperienced players. Though recalled to the Test squad for the three-match series against Sri Lanka, he did not play in the series and was dropped from the ODI squad to face the same opponents. Originally rested from the Test team to give younger players a chance, Riaz's hiatus from the squad extended to six months. His continued absence was not explained by the PCB. He was recalled to Pakistan's Test squad to face England for three matches in the United Arab Emirates. While he was out of the team, Riaz played for the National Bank of Pakistan in the Quaid-i-Azam Trophy. Before the squad was announced he had taken 30 wickets in the competition at an average of 24.86, and 213 runs at an average of 35.50.

On 30 August 2016, he conceded 110 runs in his stipulated 10 overs, which is the second worst bowling figure ever in ODI cricket.

In April 2018, he was named in Punjab's squad for the 2018 Pakistan Cup. In March 2019, he was named in Khyber Pakhtunkhwa's squad for the 2019 Pakistan Cup. He was the joint-leading wicket-taker in the tournament, with ten dismissals in five matches.

In June 2020, he was named in a 29-man squad for Pakistan's tour to England during the COVID-19 pandemic. However, on 23 June 2020, Riaz was one of seven players from Pakistan's squad to test positive for COVID-19. In July, he was shortlisted in Pakistan's 20-man squad for the Test matches against England.

He retired from international cricket in August 2023.

=== 2015 Cricket World Cup ===
In January 2015, he was named in Pakistan's squad for the 2015 Cricket World Cup, after the Pakistan Cricket Board (PCB) named their final fifteen-man squad for the tournament.

In Pakistan's opening matches, he took 1 wicket each against India and West Indies. He followed by a man of the match performance against Zimbabwe in which he scored 54 not out off 46 balls and took 4 wickets. Against UAE, took two wickets. He followed it up by taking three wickets versus South Africa. He took three wickets against Ireland in Pakistan's last group game. In the quarterfinal match against Australia, he took Australian skipper Michael Clarke's wicket and, then, showed some aggressive interaction by sarcastic clapping and a flying kiss to Shane Watson. ICC fined Riaz for the behavior.

Riaz's spell against Australia won him plaudits from numerous cricketers past and present, with Michael Clarke referring to Riaz's performance 'as good as I've faced in ODI cricket for a long time' and Kevin Pietersen describing the spell as the "Best spell of bowling by a foreigner on Aussie soil for years".

After the match Riaz became a trend on Twitter. Brian Lara tweeted "I want to meet with this Riaz guy," adding that he would pay the fine imposed on Riaz by the ICC for his verbal altercation with Watson. Brian Lara was later invited by Riaz to Pakistan via Twitter.

=== 2019 Cricket World Cup ===
In May 2019, he was named in Pakistan's squad for the 2019 Cricket World Cup, after the Pakistan Cricket Board (PCB) named their final fifteen-man squad for the tournament.

He was a regular starter throughout the tournament and took 11 wickets in 8 games with an economy of 6 runs per over and a bowling strike rate of 36.3 balls.

During the tournament, he became Pakistan's 2nd highest wicket-taker in World Cup history going past Imran Khan's tally of 34 wickets.

=== T20 franchise career ===
Riaz was allocated as a Platinum category player in the 2016 Pakistan Super League players draft. He was bought by Peshawar Zalmi for $140,000 for the 2016 competition.

During a group stage match in 2016 against Quetta Gladiators, Riaz had an exchange of words and a physical tussle with batsman Ahmed Shehzad. The Pakistan Cricket Board imposed a fine on both the players and issued an official warning to them.

He was retained by the Peshawar Zalmi for the second PSL season in 2017. Peshawar won the 2017 competition and, as of the end of the 2017 PSL, Riaz is the leading wicket-taker with 30 wickets in 19 matches. He has played for Zalmi in every edition so far. On 18 February 2022 Wahab took his 100th wicket in the PSL for Peshawar, becoming the first player overall to reach the milestone.

In September 2018, he was named in Kandahar's squad in the first edition of the Afghanistan Premier League tournament. In June 2019, he was selected to play for the Brampton Wolves franchise team in the 2019 Global T20 Canada tournament. In September 2019, he was named in the squad for the Cape Town Blitz team for the 2019 Mzansi Super League tournament. In November 2019, he was selected to play for the Dhaka Platoon in the 2019–20 Bangladesh Premier League. In October 2020, he was drafted by the Kandy Tuskers for the inaugural edition of the Lanka Premier League. In May 2021, he was named in the St Lucia Zouks squad for the 2021 Caribbean Premier League. In November 2021, he was selected to play for the Jaffna Kings following the players' draft for the 2021 Lanka Premier League.

In April 2022, he was bought by the Northern Superchargers for the 2022 season of The Hundred in England.

In January 2023, while playing for the Khulna Tigers in the 2022–23 Bangladesh Premier League, he became the first Pakistani bowler to take 400 T20 wickets.

== Post-retirement ==
=== Political career ===
In January 2023, Riaz was appointed as sports minister in Mohsin Raza Naqvi's caretaker Punjab government but could not take his oath due to his busy schedule. He was later appointed as the Advisor to Chief Minister Punjab for sports and youth affairs on 22 March 2023.

=== Cricket administration ===
Riaz was appointed as the chief selector of Pakistan national team on 17 November 2023. In March of the following year, he was demoted as chief selector but remained part of the seven-man selection committee. Following the group stage exit at the 2024 Men's T20 World Cup, Riaz was dismissed from the selection committee.

== See also ==
- List of Pakistan cricketers who have taken five-wicket hauls on Test debut
