= Dwayne Smith =

West Indian cricketer (born 1983)

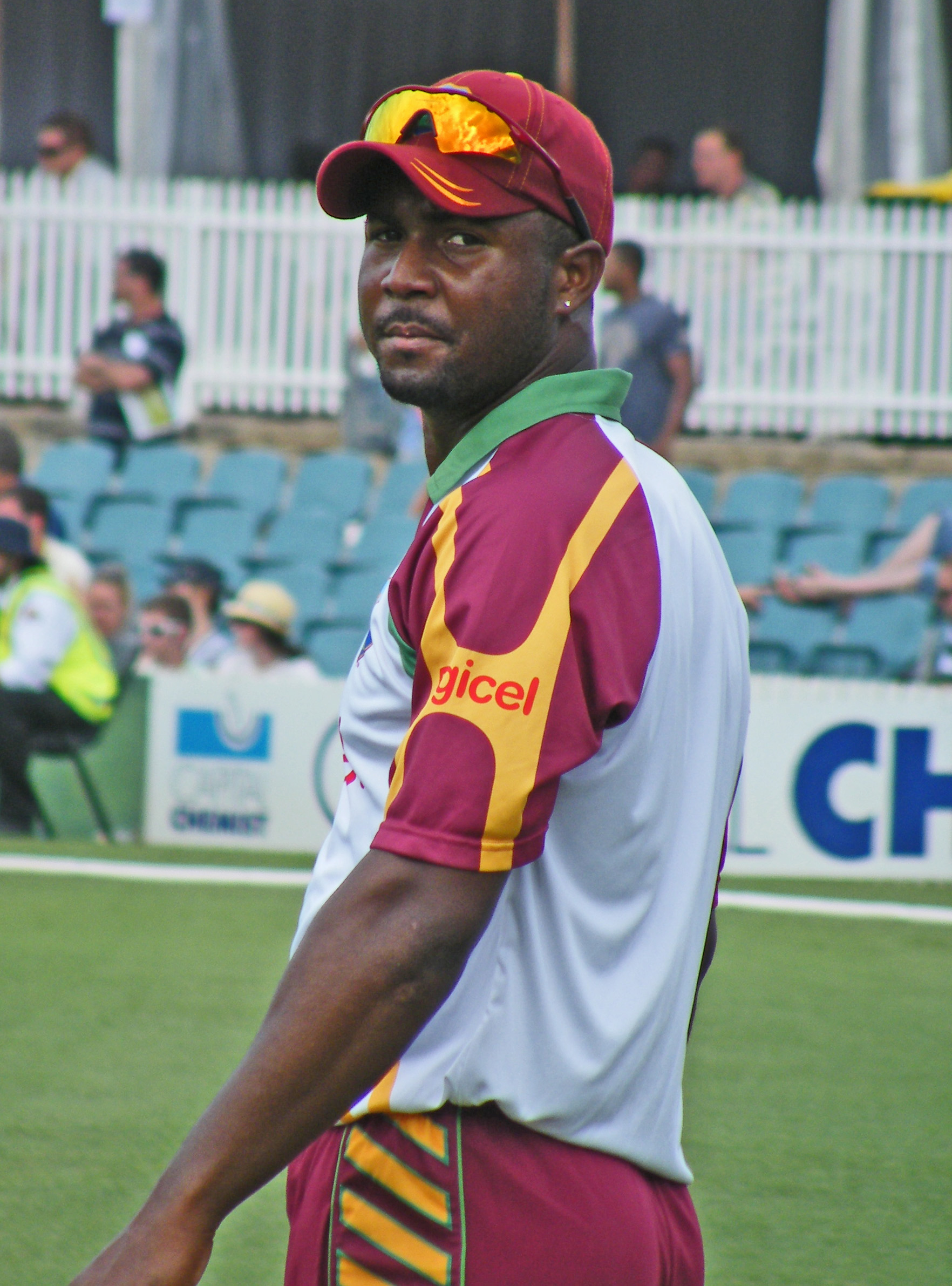
- Smith in 2010

Personal information
- Full name: Dwayne Romel Smith
- Born: 12 April 1983 (age 43); Codrington Hill, Saint Michael, Barbados
- Nickname: The Doctor
- Batting: Right-handed
- Bowling: Right-arm medium
- Role: All-rounder

International information
- National side: West Indies (2004–2017)
- Test debut (cap 255): 2 January 2004 v South Africa
- Last Test: 25 March 2006 v New Zealand
- ODI debut (cap 120): 25 January 2004 v South Africa
- Last ODI: 15 March 2015 v United Arab Emirates
- T20I debut (cap 10): 16 February 2006 v New Zealand
- Last T20I: 14 January 2015 v South Africa

Domestic team information
- Years: Team
- 2001/02–2014/15 (Note: Not every team that Smith played for is shown in this list.): Barbados
- 2008; 2012–2013: Mumbai Indians
- 2008–2013: Sussex
- 2009–2010: Deccan Chargers
- 2009/10: New South Wales
- 2012: Khulna Royal Bengals
- 2013: Sylhet Royals
- 2013–2015; 2017–2018: Barbados Tridents (squad no. 814)
- 2014–2015: Chennai Super Kings
- 2016–2017: Islamabad United (squad no. 814)
- 2016–2017: Gujarat Lions (squad no. 50)
- 2016: Guyana Amazon Warriors
- 2018: Peshawar Zalmi (squad no. 50)
- 2019: Quetta Gladiators
- 2019: Jamaica Tallawahs

Career statistics
Competition	Test	ODI	T20I	FC
Matches	10	105	33	88
Runs scored	320	1,560	582	3,852
Batting average	24.61	18.57	18.18	28.74
100s/50s	1/0	0/8	0/3	7/15
Top score	105*	97	72	155
Balls bowled	651	2,726	142	8,643
Wickets	7	61	7	138
Bowling average	49.14	37.46	30.28	30.95
5 wickets in innings	0	1	0	1
10 wickets in match	0	0	0	0
Best bowling	3/71	5/45	3/24	5/17
Catches/stumpings	9/–	27/–	8/–	82/–
Medal record
Men's Cricket
Representing West Indies
ICC Champions Trophy
Runner-up	2006 India
ICC Men's T20 World Cup
Winner	2012 Sri Lanka
- Source: ESPNcricinfo, 3 October 2019

Dwayne Romel Smith (born 12 April 1983) is a former Barbadian international cricketer who has represented the West Indies in all three formats of the game. An all-rounder, he is known as an aggressive and powerful right-handed batsman, bowls medium pace, and is also an athletic fielder. Smith was a part of the West Indies team that won the 2012 T20 World Cup.

Smith had played for Barbados since the start of his career but also played three seasons, from 2008 to 2010, for Sussex. He became a sought-after Twenty20 player, making appearances in the Indian Premier League for the Chennai Super Kings, Mumbai Indians together with the Deccan Chargers, Islamabad United in the Pakistan Super League, New South Wales in the Australian Big Bash, and Khulna Royal Bengals in the Bangladesh Premier League. On 1 March 2017, Smith announced his retirement from international cricket.

Smith previously held the record for the highest strike rate of 414.28 in a T20I innings, before it was broken by Harry Brook in 2023.

== Domestic career ==
Smith made his first-class debut for Barbados in January 2002 in a Busta Cup match against Guyana. He did not bowl in the match but made scores of 10 and 35; his second innings ended after he was out hit wicket, an unusual form of dismissal. In his fifth match of the season, against the Leeward Islands, there were two notable occasions for Smith; he took his first wicket and, with an innings of 102, scored his first century. He finished the season with a batting average of 21.36.

In the 2002–03 season, his bowling was used more often. He took seven wickets at an average of 28.42. His batting average improved to 24.55 but he was not able to score a half century during the season. Barbados finished as tournament winners but Smith did not feature in the final. It was not until October 2003 that Smith played his first List-A match, scoring a duck on his debut against Antigua and Barbuda in the 2003–04 Red Stripe Bowl. However, his form improved and he finished the season with a batting average of 39.75 and a highest score of 92 not out.

Smith went on to score the most runs in the 2009 edition of the WICB Cup. He later won with Barbados the 2011 WICB Cup title, which was shared with the Leeward Islands. He also won the 2014 CPL title with the Barbados Tridents, scoring a match winning 59 in the final against the Guyana Amazon Warriors.

Smith once again top-scored in the 2014 Regional Super 50 tournament. He went on to score a match-winning innings of 83 for Barbados against Trinidad and Tobago in the final of the tournament. Smith was awarded the man of the match for his triumphant knock.

=== Indian Premier League ===
In 2008 Smith was added to the Mumbai Indians squad during the inaugural IPL season, he replaced his national teammate Dwayne Bravo. He played four games during the season and was most notable for his bowling; he took 5 wickets at an average of 16.60.

In the following edition of the IPL Smith was bought at the player auction for US$100,000 by the Deccan Chargers. His batting was a lot more successful than his bowling on this occasion; he scored 215 runs at an average of 26.87 compared with 1 wicket at an average of 124.00. Deccan Chargers won the tournament but Smith did not appear in the knock-out stages. He was retained by the Deccan chargers for the 2010 season but only played three matches. In 2012, he was signed by the Mumbai Indians as a replacement player for the injured Mitchell Johnson. On 6 May 2012, he played a vital role in the win of Mumbai Indians against Chennai Super Kings, when he hit Ben Hilfenhaus to the fence thrice in a row – a 6, followed by two consecutive 4s, when 14 runs were required off the last three balls.

In 2014, Smith was bought by Chennai Super Kings for Rs. 42,500,000.

=== Pakistan Super League ===
Smith was bought for disclosed amount by Islamabad United he made his debut in 2016 season. Smith joined the side when half of team's matches were played. In the Final of 2016 season Smith won the Man of the Match award after he took United to title victory by scoring 73 from 51 balls. He was retained by United at 2017 Pakistan Super League players draft. He was the leading run scorer for his side scoring 274 runs in 9 matches he played.

=== County cricket ===
Smith has spent three seasons playing for the English County side Sussex. He originally signed for Sussex on a short-term deal for their 2008 Twenty20 Cup season. After impressive performances, in particular a highest score of 72 not out against Hampshire, he signed a two-and-a-half-year deal as a Kolpak player. That season Smith also played in for Sussex in the Pro40. He played seven of the eight matches, helping Sussex to the Division one title.

Smith played a much greater role in the following season for Sussex, making appearances in all four domestic competitions. Sussex reached two finals in the season, the first of which, the Friends Provident Trophy they lost to Hampshire with Smith scoring 20. The next final was to be more successful for Smith as Sussex beat Somerset in the Twenty20 Cup with him earning the man of the match award in scoring 59. More success came for Sussex and Smith that season when they again won the Pro40, with him averaging 35.16 with the bat and 15.88 with the ball throughout the tournament. He also took a hat-trick in a game against Nottinghamshire. Although they were successful in the one-day formats, they were relegated from Division one of the County Championship. Due to their triumph in the Twenty20 Cup, Sussex qualified for the Champions League. Smith decided to play for Sussex rather than his IPL team, the Deccan Chargers, who had also qualified for the tournament. Sussex were eliminated after finishing last in the group stage.

He returned to Sussex to play in the Friends Life t20 in 2010 as an overseas player after his Kolpak status had expired.

=== New South Wales ===
Smith was signed by New South Wales for the 2009–10 KFC Twenty20 Big Bash. He played all five matches in the group stage as New South Wales finished fourth and did not proceed to the final. Although his batting was disappointing, 31 runs at 7.75, he took 6 wickets at an average of 17.50.

=== Other T20 franchise cricket ===
For his performances in 2013, he was named in the ESPNcricinfo CLT20 XI.

In June 2019, he was selected to play for the Winnipeg Hawks franchise team in the 2019 Global T20 Canada tournament.

He was selected by India Capitals for the first season of Legends League Cricket and by Urbanrisers Hyderabad for the second season.

== International career ==
=== International breakthrough ===
Following the 2002–03 Red Stripe Bowl, Smith was included in the West Indies squad to tour South Africa. He made his Test debut in the third match of the series. After scoring 20 in the first innings, Smith helped the West Indies to save the game in the second as he made 105 not out on the final day to become the eleventh West Indian to score a hundred on Test debut. Smith played nine more Tests for the West Indies over the next two years without excelling with bat or ball, his debut hundred remains the only time he has passed 50 in a Test innings. During the tour he also made his ODI debut. He played all five matches of the series and finished with a disappointing average of 12.33.

=== ODI regular (2004–2007) ===
After playing all five matches of the ODI series against England in April/May 2004, averaging 29.25 with the bat, Smith took part in his most successful ODI series yet, against the touring Bangladesh team. Smith won two-man of the match awards to help the West Indies win the series 3–0. The first was achieved after an innings of 62 not out in the second match at Kingstown followed by an all-round display at St George's where he took 3/24 in addition to scoring 23.

Later in the year Smith endured a disastrous tour of England. After a poor performance in the triangular ODI tournament (also involving New Zealand), where he averaged 4.20 with the bat and 56.33 with the ball, he was forced to return home after injuring his shoulder in the final Test. The injury ruled him out of that year's Champions Trophy and he did not play another international match until May 2005.

In his return to the side he played all five matches of the home ODI series against South Africa. His performance was poor, in particular his bowling, he took one wicket for 135 runs. He had more success in the Indian Oil Cup later in the year, playing against India and hosts, Sri Lanka. The West Indies failed to qualify for the final but Smith finished the tournament with respectable averages of 31.75 with the bat and 40.00 with the ball.

In the early 2006 tour against New Zealand, Smith made his biggest bowling contribution yet to the West Indies team, taking 9 wickets at an impressive average of 24.33. His wicket tally included innings figures of 5/45, which earned him the man of the match award at Eden Park and remains his best ODI bowling figures. Smith made his Twenty20 International debut during the tour, scoring 9 runs and taking 2 wickets in a tied match.

=== Champions Trophy and World Cup ===
After featuring in home series against Zimbabwe and India, and the DLF Cup (a triangular tournament played in Malaysia that also included Australia and India), Smith was included in the West Indies squad for the 2006 Champions Trophy. Although the West Indies, who were defending the title they won in 2004, reached the final, Smith made little contribution with bat or ball. After taking only two wickets and scoring eight runs over five matches played during the tournament, he was not included in the final against Australia.

=== Return to international cricket ===
Smith ended a gap of nearly two and a half years out of the West Indies side when he was called up to the squad for the ODI and T20I series in Australia in early 2010. Although Smith performed well, averaging 43.33 with the bat and 32.71 with the ball, the West Indies were soundly beaten 4–0 in the ODI series. After playing two matches against Zimbabwe following the tour of Australia, Smith again found himself out of the side. He was recalled for the Twenty20 series against England in September 2011.

== Post-retirement ==
After retiring from international cricket, Dwayne Smith went on to participate in the second edition of the 2017 Hong Kong T20 Blitz and he became the first player as well as first overseas player to score a century in Hong Kong T20 Blitz.
