= Imran Khalid =

Pakistani cricketer (born 1982)

Personal information
- Full name: Imran Khalid
- Born: 29 December 1982 (age 43); Kot Radha Kishan, Punjab, Pakistan
- Batting: Left-handed
- Bowling: Slow left-arm orthodox
- Role: Bowling all-rounder

Domestic team information
- Years: Team
- 2004/05–2012/13: Faisalabad
- 2004/05–2014/15: Faisalabad Wolves
- 2004/05–2018/19: Sui Northern Gas Pipelines Limited
- 2006/07: Punjab
- 2015/16–2016/17: Islamabad United
- 2016: Islamabad
- 2016/17: Peshawar
- 2017/18: Rawalpindi
- 2017/18: Kalabagan Krira Chakra

Career statistics
Competition	First-class	List A	Twenty20
Matches	72	97	93
Runs scored	2,171	1,505	611
Batting average	24.39	24.67	14.20
100s/50s	2/8	2/3	0/0
Top score	113	108	48
Balls bowled	11,539	4,636	1,854
Wickets	230	133	88
Bowling average	23.88	27.54	23.10
5 wickets in innings	9	0	0
10 wickets in match	1	–	–
Best bowling	6/94	4/22	4/20
Catches/stumpings	24/–	26/–	26/–
- Source: Cricinfo, 3 May 2026

Imran Khalid (born 29 December 1982) is a Pakistani former cricketer. A left-handed batsman and slow left-arm orthodox bowler, he was born in Kot Radha Kishan, Punjab. He played domestic cricket for Faisalabad, Faisalabad Wolves, Sui Northern Gas Pipelines Limited (SNGPL), Punjab, Islamabad, Peshawar, Rawalpindi and Kalabagan Krira Chakra, and represented Islamabad United in the Pakistan Super League.

Khalid began his first-class career with Faisalabad in the 2004–05 season and later spent much of his career with SNGPL. In September 2005, he was part of the Faisalabad Wolves side that won the International 20:20 Club Championship at Grace Road, Leicester. In the final against Chilaw Marians Cricket Club, he took 1 for 27 and was 7 not out as Faisalabad won by five wickets.

Khalid made two centuries in first-class cricket and two in List A cricket, with career-best scores of 113 and 108 respectively. In October 2011, he made an unbeaten 101 for SNGPL against Hyderabad in the Quaid-e-Azam Trophy Division Two at the Niaz Stadium, helping his side reach 461 for 7 and take control of the match. He also contributed as a lower-order batsman in limited-overs cricket; in January 2015, he took 4 for 40 and then made an unbeaten 47 in an unbroken stand with Hussain Talat as SNGPL beat Karachi Dolphins in the Gold Cup.

As a bowler, Khalid took nine five-wicket hauls and one ten-wicket match in first-class cricket. In January 2014, he claimed a five-wicket haul for SNGPL against WAPDA in the President’s Trophy, giving his side a first-innings lead. Later that year, in the Quaid-e-Azam Trophy Gold League, he took 4 for 17 and 5 for 43 against WAPDA at Karachi as SNGPL won by eight wickets. In November 2018, he returned 4 for 28 and 5 for 25 against Lahore Blues, finishing with match figures of 9 for 53 in SNGPL's innings-and-28-run win.

Khalid was selected by Islamabad United for the inaugural Pakistan Super League in 2016. He took 10 wickets in 12 PSL matches for the franchise, with best figures of 4 for 20. His best PSL performance came in the 2016 qualifying final against Peshawar Zalmi in Dubai, when his four-wicket haul helped bowl Peshawar out for 126 after Sharjeel Khan's century had taken Islamabad to 176 for 3.

In the 2017–18 National T20 Cup, Khalid hit a last-ball six against Peshawar to give Faisalabad a five-wicket win and take the side into the semi-finals. He also took 2 for 36 earlier in the match. By the end of his senior career, Khalid had taken 230 wickets and scored 2,171 runs in 72 first-class matches, taken 133 wickets and scored 1,505 runs in List A cricket, and taken 88 wickets in 93 Twenty20 matches.
