= Mohammad Asghar (cricketer) =

Pakistani cricketer (born 1998)

Personal information
- Born: 28 December 1998 (age 27); Killa Abdullah, Balochistan, Pakistan
- Batting: Right-handed
- Bowling: Slow left-arm orthodox
- Role: Bowler

Domestic team information
- Years: Team
- 2015: Rawalpindi Rams
- 2016–2018: Peshawar Zalmi
- 2013–2015: National Bank of Pakistan cricket team
- 2016–2018: United Bank Limited cricket team
- 2019: Quetta Gladiators
- 2019/20–present: Balochistan

Career statistics
Competition	FC	LA	T20
Matches	27	62	46
Runs scored	202	95	20
Batting average	9.18	7.30	3.33
100s/50s	0/0	0/0	0/0
Top score	41	27	8*
Balls bowled	2677	2664	946
Wickets	103	102	51
Bowling average	25.99	26.11	22.11
5 wickets in innings	6	5	0
10 wickets in match	1	0	0
Best bowling	5/28	4/22	3/13
Catches/stumpings	12/–	32/–	20/–
- Source: Espncricinfo, 17 November 2018

Mohammad Asghar (Pashto: محمد اصغر; born 28 December 1998) is a Pakistani first-class cricketer, who plays as a slow left-arm orthodox bowler. He is from Chaman, Pakistan. He plays for the United Bank Limited cricket team in the first-class arena, and for Quetta Gladiators in the Pakistan Super League. In December 2016, he was added to Pakistan's Test squad for their series against Australia. In March 2017, he was named in Pakistan's One Day International (ODI) squad for their series against the West Indies.

In April 2018, he was named in Sindh's squad for the 2018 Pakistan Cup. In December 2018, he was named in Pakistan's team for the 2018 ACC Emerging Teams Asia Cup. In March 2019, he was named in Punjab's squad for the 2019 Pakistan Cup.

In September 2019, he was named in Balochistan's squad for the 2019–20 Quaid-e-Azam Trophy tournament.
