= Ahmad Shahzad =

Pakistani cricketer

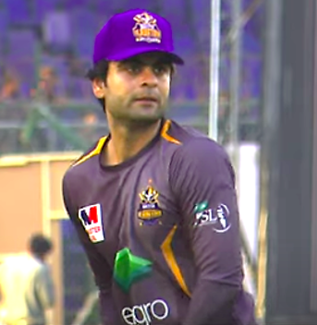
- Shahzad in 2020

Personal information
- Born: 23 November 1991 (age 34); Lahore, Punjab, Pakistan
- Batting: Right-handed
- Bowling: Legbreak
- Role: Opening batter

International information
- National side: Pakistan (2009–2019)
- Test debut (cap 216): 31 December 2013 v Sri Lanka
- Last Test: 4 May 2017 v West Indies
- ODI debut (cap 172): 24 April 2009 v Australia
- Last ODI: 16 October 2017 v Sri Lanka
- ODI shirt no.: 19
- T20I debut (cap 26): 7 May 2009 v Australia
- Last T20I: 7 October 2019 v Sri Lanka
- T20I shirt no.: 19 (previously 93)

Domestic team information
- Years: Team
- 2007–2019: Habib Bank Limited
- 2012: Barisal Burners
- 2012: Nagenahira Nagas
- 2008–2015: Lahore Lions
- 2013: Pakistan A cricket team
- 2013–2014: Jamaica Tallawahs
- 2015: Comilla Victorians
- 2016–2017, 2019: Quetta Gladiators
- 2016: Barbados Tridents
- 2018: Multan Sultans
- 2019–2022: Central Punjab
- 2019: Rangpur Rangers
- 2019/20: Dhaka Platoon
- 2021: Kandy Warriors
- 2021: Rawalakot Hawks
- 2023: Lahore Whites

Career statistics
Competition	Test	ODI	T20I	FC
Matches	13	81	59	90
Runs scored	982	2,585	1,471	6,137
Batting average	40.91	32.56	25.80	40.91
100s/50s	3/4	6/14	1/7	14/36
Top score	176	124	111*	254
Balls bowled	48	115	6	1,349
Wickets	0	2	0	19
Bowling average	–	70.00	–	49.78
5 wickets in innings	–	0	–	0
10 wickets in match	–	0	–	0
Best bowling	–	1/22	–	4/7
Catches/stumpings	3/–	26/–	15/–	80/–
Medal record
Men's cricket
Representing Pakistan
T20 World Cup
Winner	2009 England	Team
Champions Trophy
Winner	2017 England & Wales	Team
Asia Cup
Runner-up	2014 Bangladesh
- Source: CricInfo, 28 July 2022

Ahmad Shahzad (born 23 November 1991) is a former Pakistani international cricketer.

He is an opening batsman who made his One Day International and Twenty20 International debut for Pakistan in April 2009 against Australia. He was a member of the Pakistan team that won the 2009 ICC World Twenty20. In the 2014 T20 World Cup, he became the first Pakistani to score a century in a T20 world cup, with his 111 against Bangladesh.

== Early and personal life ==
Shahzad was born on 23 November 1991 in Lahore. He was born into a Pashtun family of the Afridi clan and, besides English and Urdu, he can speak Pashto as well.

He grew up in a middle-class environment in a modest house near the famous Anarkali Bazaar.

On 19 September 2015, Shahzad married Sana, his childhood friend. They had a boy in 2017. In 2021, they had a second baby, a daughter.

== Domestic and franchise career ==
Shahzad was the highest run scorer in BPL 2011-12 and the best batsman of the tournament. Shahzad was the leading run-scorer in the 2016–17 Departmental One Day Cup, with 653 runs, including a career-best score in List A cricket of 166 in the semi-final. He was also the captain of the team. During the tournament he scored three centuries and three half-centuries in nine matches.

He was the highest runs scorer and man of the tournament in 2016 Pakistan Cup. He scored 372 runs in only 5 matches with the help of 3 half centuries and a hundred.

In April 2018, he was named as the captain of Balochistan's squad for the 2018 Pakistan Cup. He scored the most runs for Baluchistan during the tournament, with 251 runs in four matches. In March 2019, he was named in Federal Areas' squad for the 2019 Pakistan Cup.

He failed a doping test in 2018 and was banned for 10 weeks.

In July 2019, he was selected to play for the Amsterdam Knights in the inaugural edition of the Euro T20 Slam cricket tournament. However, the following month the tournament was cancelled.

In September 2019, he was named in Central Punjab's squad for the 2019–20 Quaid-e-Azam Trophy tournament. He was retained by Central Punjab for the 2020–21 domestic season. In November 2021, he was selected to play for the Colombo Stars following the players' draft for the 2021 Lanka Premier League.

On 15 December 2023, Shahzad announced that he was leaving the PSL after not being selected by any franchise.

== International career ==
Shahzad made his first-class debut in 2007. The innings which led to a call-up for the national team was a 167 he scored in Pakistan Youth's victory against England.

Shahzad made his Test debut against Sri Lanka in 2013 scoring 38 in the first innings and 55 in the second. He was part of the Test squad against South Africa in UAE. However he wasn't selected in the playing XI in either of the 2 Tests against South Africa.

He has a 40+ test average for Pakistan Cricket Team with the help of 3 hundreds and 3 half centuries. His test hundreds have been scored against Sri Lanka where he scored 147 runs, Australia where he scored 136 runs and New Zealand where he scored 176 runs

In his One Day International career he has scored 6 hundreds and 14 half centuries. In his Twenty20 International career, he has scored 1 hundred 7 fifties. He is First Pakistani player who has scored a century in all three forms of cricket.

== Controversies ==
Shahzad was issued a one-match ban in 2011 for showing dissent in the Quaid-e-Azam Trophy, one month before being issued a fine on disciplinary grounds.

The Pakistan Cricket Board (PCB) issued Shahzad an official reprimand after his frequent quarrels with Sri Lankan batsman Tillakaratne Dilshan about Dilshan's conversion from Islam to Buddhism. Shehzad was caught on camera telling Dilshan:

If you are a non-Muslim and you turn Muslim, no matter whatever you do in your life, straight to heaven.

— Ahmed Shehzad's statement on Dilshan.

During a Pakistan Super League group stage match vs Peshawar Zalmi, Shahzad had an exchange of words and physical conflict with bowler Wahab Riaz. The Pakistan Cricket Board (PCB) imposed a fine on both players and issued an official warning to them.
