= Pakistani cricket team in the West Indies in 2025 =

International cricket tour

	West Indies	Pakistan
- Dates: 31 July – 12 August 2025
Captains	Shai Hope	Mohammad Rizwan (ODIs); Salman Ali Agha (T20Is)

One Day International series
- Results: West Indies won the 3-match series 2–1
Most runs	Shai Hope (207)	Hassan Nawaz (112)
Most wickets	Jayden Seales (10)	Naseem Shah (5)
- Player of the series: Jayden Seales (WI)

Twenty20 International series
- Results: Pakistan won the 3-match series 2–1
Most runs	Sherfane Rutherford (71); Jewel Andrew (71)	Saim Ayub (130)
Most wickets	Jason Holder (6)	Mohammad Nawaz (7)
- Player of the series: Mohammad Nawaz (Pak)

The Pakistani cricket team toured the United States and the West Indies in July and August 2025 to play the West Indies cricket team. The tour consisted of three One Day International (ODI) and three Twenty20 International (T20I) matches. In February 2025, the Cricket West Indies (CWI) confirmed the fixtures for the tour, as a part of the 2025 home international season.

West Indies registered their first ODI series win against Pakistan after 34 years.

== Squads ==
West Indies		Pakistan	
ODIs	T20Is	ODIs	T20Is
Shai Hope (c, wk); Jewel Andrew; Jediah Blades; Keacy Carty; Roston Chase; ~~Matthew Forde~~; Justin Greaves; Amir Jangoo (wk); Shamar Joseph; Brandon King; Johann Layne; Evin Lewis; Gudakesh Motie; Sherfane Rutherford; Jayden Seales; Romario Shepherd	Shai Hope (c, wk); Jewel Andrew; Alick Athanaze; Jediah Blades; Keacy Carty; Johnson Charles (wk); Roston Chase; Matthew Forde; Jason Holder; Akeal Hosein; Shamar Joseph; Gudakesh Motie; Sherfane Rutherford; Romario Shepherd	Mohammad Rizwan (c, wk); Salman Ali Agha (vc); Shaheen Afridi; Abrar Ahmed; Hasan Ali; Faheem Ashraf; Saim Ayub; Babar Azam; Mohammad Haris (wk); Sufiyan Muqeem; Hassan Nawaz; Mohammad Nawaz; Abdullah Shafique; Naseem Shah; Hussain Talat; ~~Fakhar Zaman~~	Salman Ali Agha (c); Shaheen Afridi; Abrar Ahmed; Hasan Ali; Faheem Ashraf; Saim Ayub; Sahibzada Farhan (wk); Mohammad Haris (wk); Sufiyan Muqeem; Hassan Nawaz; Mohammad Nawaz; Haris Rauf; Khushdil Shah; Hussain Talat; Fakhar Zaman

On 3 August Fakhar Zaman was ruled out of the third T20I and ODI series after sustaining a left hamstring strain during the second T20I.

On 7 August, Matthew Forde was ruled out of the ODI series due to dislocation of his left shoulder while attempting a catch during the practice session, with Johann Layne named as his replacement.

== T20I series ==
=== 1st T20I ===
31 July 2025
20:00 (N)
Scorecard

Pakistan; 178/6 (20 overs)	v	West Indies; 164/7 (20 overs)
Saim Ayub 57 (38); Shamar Joseph 3/30 (4 overs)		Jewel Andrew 35 (33); Mohammad Nawaz 3/23 (4 overs)

Pakistan won by 14 runs
Central Broward Park, Lauderhill
Umpires: Deighton Butler (WI) and Leslie Reifer (WI)
Player of the match: Saim Ayub (Pak)

- West Indies won the toss and elected to field.
- Jewel Andrew (WI) made his T20I debut.

=== 2nd T20I ===
2 August 2025
20:00 (N)
Scorecard

Pakistan; 133/9 (20 overs)	v	West Indies; 135/8 (20 overs)
Hassan Nawaz 40 (23); Jason Holder 4/19 (4 overs)		Gudakesh Motie 28 (20); Mohammad Nawaz 3/14 (4 overs)

West Indies won by 2 wickets
Central Broward Park, Lauderhill
Umpires: Deighton Butler (WI) and Gregory Brathwaite (WI)
Player of the match: Jason Holder (WI)

- Pakistan won the toss and elected to bat.
- Jason Holder became West Indies's leading wicket taker in T20Is (81) going past Dwayne Bravo (78).

=== 3rd T20I ===
3 August 2025
20:00 (N)
Scorecard

Pakistan; 189/4 (20 overs)	v	West Indies; 176/6 (20 overs)
Sahibzada Farhan 74 (53); Roston Chase 1/31 (4 overs)		Alick Athanaze 60 (40); Sufiyan Muqeem 1/20 (4 overs)

Pakistan won by 13 runs
Central Broward Park, Lauderhill
Umpires: Zahid Bassarath (WI) and Leslie Reifer (WI)
Player of the match: Sahibzada Farhan (Pak)

- Pakistan won the toss and elected to bat.

== ODI series ==
=== 1st ODI ===
8 August 2025
14:00 (D/N)
Scorecard

West Indies; 280 (49 overs)	v	Pakistan; 284/5 (48.5 overs)
Evin Lewis 60 (62); Shaheen Afridi 4/51 (8 overs)		Hassan Nawaz 63* (54); Shamar Joseph 2/65 (9.5 overs)

Pakistan won by 5 wickets
Brian Lara Cricket Academy, San Fernando
Umpires: Deighton Butler (WI) and Allahudien Paleker (SA)
Player of the match: Hassan Nawaz (Pak)

- Pakistan won the toss and elected to field.
- Hassan Nawaz (Pak) made his ODI debut.

=== 2nd ODI ===
10 August 2025
09:30
Scorecard

Pakistan; 171/7 (37 overs)	v	West Indies; 184/5 (33.2 overs)
Hassan Nawaz 36* (30); Jayden Seales 3/23 (7 overs)		Roston Chase 49* (47); Mohammad Nawaz 2/17 (7 overs)

West Indies won by 5 wickets (DLS method)
Brian Lara Cricket Academy, San Fernando
Umpires: Zahid Bassarath (WI) and Sharfuddoula (Ban)
Player of the match: Roston Chase (WI)

- West Indies won the toss and elected to field.
- Rain interrupted Pakistan's innings at 37 overs.
- West Indies were set a revised target of 181 runs from 35 overs.

=== 3rd ODI ===
12 August 2025
09:30
Scorecard

West Indies; 294/6 (50 overs)	v	Pakistan; 92 (29.2 overs)
Shai Hope 120* (94); Abrar Ahmed 2/34 (9 overs)		Salman Ali Agha 30 (49); Jayden Seales 6/18 (7.2 overs)

West Indies won by 202 runs
Brian Lara Cricket Academy, San Fernando
Umpires: Allahudien Paleker (SA) and Leslie Reifer (WI)
Player of the match: Shai Hope (WI)

- Pakistan won the toss and elected to field.
- Jayden Seales (WI) took his maiden five-wicket haul in ODIs.
- This was West Indies's largest victory in terms of runs in ODI against Pakistan.
