= Pakistani cricket team in Sri Lanka in 2025–26 =

International cricket tour

	Sri Lanka	Pakistan
- Dates: 7 – 11 January 2026
Captains	Dasun Shanaka	Salman Ali Agha

Twenty20 International series
- Results: 3-match series drawn 1–1
Most runs	Janith Liyanage (62)	Salman Ali Agha (61)
Most wickets	Wanindu Hasaranga (5)	Mohammad Wasim Jr. (5)
- Player of the series: Wanindu Hasaranga (SL)

The Pakistan cricket team toured Sri Lanka in January 2026 to play the Sri Lanka cricket team. The tour consisted of three Twenty20 International (T20I) matches. The series forms part of both teams' preparation ahead of the 2026 Men's T20 World Cup tournament. All the matches were played at the Rangiri Dambulla International Stadium. The series was leveled 1–1.

== Squads ==
Sri Lanka	Pakistan
Dasun Shanaka (c); Charith Asalanka; Dushmantha Chameera; Dhananjaya de Silva; Wanindu Hasaranga; Dushan Hemantha; Janith Liyanage; Eshan Malinga; Traveen Mathew; Kamindu Mendis; Kusal Mendis (wk); Kamil Mishara; Pathum Nissanka; Matheesha Pathirana; Kusal Perera (wk); Maheesh Theekshana; Nuwan Thushara; Dunith Wellalage	Salman Ali Agha (c); Abrar Ahmed; Faheem Ashraf; Saim Ayub; Sahibzada Farhan (wk); Shadab Khan; Usman Khan (wk); Salman Mirza; Khawaja Nafay (wk); Mohammad Nawaz; Abdul Samad; Naseem Shah; Usman Tariq; Mohammad Wasim Jr.; Fakhar Zaman

== T20I series ==
=== 1st T20I ===
7 January 2026
19:00 (N)
Scorecard

Sri Lanka; 128 (19.2 overs)	v	Pakistan; 129/4 (16.4 overs)
Janith Liyanage 40 (31); Salman Mirza 3/18 (4 overs)		Sahibzada Farhan 51 (36); Dhananjaya de Silva 1/4 (2 overs)

Pakistan won by 6 wickets
Rangiri Dambulla International Stadium, Dambulla
Umpires: Chamara de Soysa (SL) and Ravindra Kottahachchi (SL)
Player of the match: Shadab Khan (Pak)

- Pakistan won the toss and elected to field.

=== 2nd T20I ===
9 January 2026
19:00 (N)
Scorecard

Sri Lanka	v	Pakistan

Match abandoned
Rangiri Dambulla International Stadium, Dambulla
Umpires: Chamara de Soysa (SL) and Raveendra Wimalasiri (SL)

- No toss.
- No play was possible due to rain.

=== 3rd T20I ===
11 January 2026
19:00 (N)
Scorecard

Sri Lanka; 160/6 (12 overs)	v	Pakistan; 146/8 (12 overs)
Dasun Shanaka 34 (9); Mohammad Wasim Jr. 3/54 (3 overs)		Salman Ali Agha 45 (12); Wanindu Hasaranga 4/35 (3 overs)

Sri Lanka won by 14 runs
Rangiri Dambulla International Stadium, Dambulla
Umpires: Hemantha Boteju (SL) and Ravindra Kottahachchi (SL)
Player of the match: Wanindu Hasaranga (SL)

- Pakistan won the toss and elected to field.
- The match was reduced to 12 overs per side due to rain.
- Khawaja Nafay (Pak) made his T20I debut.
- Wanindu Hasaranga (SL) took his 150th wicket in T20Is.
