= 2025 Islamabad United season =

2024 season of Islamabad United

Islamabad United
2025 season
- Coach: Mike Hesson
- Captain: Shadab Khan
- Ground(s): Rawalpindi Cricket Stadium
- PSL 2025: Play-offs (3rd)
- Most runs: Sahibzada Farhan (449)
- Most wickets: Jason Holder (15)

Islamabad United is a franchise cricket team that represents Islamabad in the Pakistan Super League (PSL). They were one of the six teams that competed in the 2025 Pakistan Super League. The team was coached by Mike Hesson, and captained by Shadab Khan. They finished third after losing Qualifier 1 to Quetta Gladiators and Eliminator 2 to Lahore Qalandars in the 2025 Pakistan Super League.

== Squad ==
Key
- Players with international caps are listed in **bold**.
- * denotes a player who is fully unavailable
- * denotes a player who will be partially unavailable

No.	Name	Nationality	Birth date	Category	Batting style	Bowling style	Year signed	Notes
Batsmen
46	Haider Ali	Pakistan	2 October 2000 (age 25)	Gold	Right-handed	—	2024	
82	Colin Munro	New Zealand	11 March 1987 (age 39)	Silver	Left-handed	Right-arm medium-fast	2020	
51	Sahibzada Farhan	Pakistan	6 March 1996 (age 30)	Supplementary	Right-handed	—	2025	
All-rounders
7	Shadab Khan	Pakistan	4 October 1998 (aged 25)	Platinum	Right-handed	Right-arm leg break	2017	Captain
9	Imad Wasim	Pakistan	18 December 1988 (aged 35)	Diamond	Left-handed	Left-arm orthodox	2024	
27	Mohammad Shehzad	Pakistan	5 February 2004 (age 22)	Supplementary	Right-handed	Right-arm medium-fast	2025	
29	Saad Masood	Pakistan	12 July 2002 (age 24)	Emerging	Right-handed	Right-arm medium	2025	
67	Salman Ali Agha	Pakistan	23 November 1993 (age 32)	Silver	Right-handed	Right-arm off-break	2024	
5	Jason Holder	West Indies	5 November 1991 (age 34)	Diamond	Right-handed	Right-arm medium-fast	2025	
98	Mohammad Nawaz	Pakistan	21 March 1994 (age 32)	Silver	Left-handed	Slow left-arm orthodox	2025	
Wicket-keepers
14	Andries Gous	United States	24 November 1993 (age 32)	Silver	Right-handed	—	2025	
23	Azam Khan	Pakistan	10 August 1998 (aged 25)	Diamond	Right-handed	—	2022	
Bowlers
26	Riley Meredith	Australia	21 June 1996 (age 30)	Supplementary	Right-handed	Right-arm fast	2025	
31	Ben Dwarshuis	Australia	23 June 1994 (age 32)	Gold	Left-handed	Left-arm medium-fast	2025	
71	Naseem Shah	Pakistan	15 February 2003 (age 23)	Platinum	Right-handed	Right-arm fast	2024	
72	Hunain Shah	Pakistan	4 February 2004 (age 22)	Emerging	Right-handed	Right-arm medium-fast	2024	
99	Salman Irshad	Pakistan	3 December 1995 (age 30)	Silver	Right-handed	Right-arm fast	2025	

- Source: ESPNcricinfo

== Administration and support staff ==
Position	Name
Manager	Rehan-ul-Haq
Head coach	Mike Hesson
Batting coach	Ashley Wright
Bowling coach	Azhar Mahmood
Performance coach	Hanif Malik
Analyst	Ben Jones
Team doctor	Jason Pilgram

- Source: Official website.

== Kit manufacturers and sponsors ==
Shirt sponsor (chest)	Shirt sponsor (back)	Chest branding	Sleeve branding
Sabroso	Ufone	Mezan	Tetra Pak, Sensodyne, Daewoo Express, Dunya News

Home kit

Away kit

Source: ProPakistani

== Season standings ==
=== Points table ===
Pos	Team	Pld	W	L	NR	Pts	NRR	Qualification
1	Quetta Gladiators (RU)	10	7	2	1	15	1.393	Advance to Qualifier 1
2	Islamabad United (3rd)	10	6	4	0	12	0.372	Advance to Qualifier 1
3	Karachi Kings (4th)	10	6	4	0	12	0.049	Advance to Eliminator
4	Lahore Qalandars (C)	10	5	4	1	11	1.036	Advance to Eliminator
5	Peshawar Zalmi	10	4	6	0	8	−0.293	
6	Multan Sultans	10	1	9	0	2	−2.449	

Source: ESPNcricinfo

== Group fixtures ==
Match 1
11 April 2025
20:30 (N)
Scorecard

Lahore Qalandars; 139 (19.2 overs)	v	Islamabad United (H); 143/2 (17.4 overs)
Abdullah Shafique 66 (38); Jason Holder 4/26 (4 overs)		Colin Munro 59 (42); Asif Afridi 1/15 (4 overs)

Islamabad United won by 8 wickets
Rawalpindi Cricket Stadium, Rawalpindi
Umpires: Chris Brown (NZ) and Ahsan Raza (Pak)
Player of the match: Jason Holder (Islamabad United)

- Islamabad United won the toss and elected to field.
- Muhammad Naeem (Lahore Qalandars) made his T20 debut.

Match 5
14 April 2025
20:00 (N)
Scorecard

(H) Islamabad United; 243/5 (20 overs)	v	Peshawar Zalmi; 141 (18.2 overs)
Sahibzada Farhan 106 (52); Alzarri Joseph 2/39 (4 overs)		Mohammad Haris 87 (47); Imad Wasim 3/26 (4 overs)

Islamabad United won by 102 runs
Rawalpindi Cricket Stadium, Rawalpindi
Umpires: Aleem Dar (Pak) and Nasir Hussain (Pak)
Player of the match: Sahibzada Farhan (Islamabad United)

- Islamabad United won the toss and elected to bat.

Match 7
16 April 2025
20:00 (N)
Scorecard

(H) Islamabad United; 202/6 (20 overs)	v	Multan Sultans; 155 (18.4 overs)
Sahibzada Farhan 53 (35); Chris Jordan 2/41 (4 overs)		Mohammad Rizwan 38 (27); Jason Holder 4/25 (4 overs)

Islamabad United won by 47 runs
Rawalpindi Cricket Stadium, Rawalpindi
Umpires: Chris Brown (NZ) and Ahsan Raza (Pak)
Player of the match: Jason Holder (Islamabad United)

- Multan Sultans won the toss and elected to field.

Match 10
20 April 2025
20:00 (N)
Scorecard

(H) Karachi Kings; 128/7 (20 overs)	v	Islamabad United; 129/4 (17.1 overs)
Tim Seifert 30 (37); Shadab Khan 2/17 (4 overs)		Shadab Khan 47 (40); Hasan Ali 2/28 (4 overs)

Islamabad United won by 6 wickets
National Stadium, Karachi
Umpires: Alex Wharf (Eng) and Asif Yaqoob (Pak)
Player of the match: Shadab Khan (Islamabad United)

- Islamabad United won the toss and elected to field.

Match 13
23 April 2025
20:00 (N)
Scorecard

(H) Multan Sultans; 168/5 (20 overs)	v	Islamabad United; 171/3 (17.1 overs)
Usman Khan 61 (40); Mohammad Nawaz 1/13 (2 overs)		Andries Gous 80* (45); Chris Jordan 1/24 (2 overs)

Islamabad United won by 7 wickets
Multan Cricket Stadium, Multan
Umpires: Chris Brown (NZ) and Ahsan Raza (Pak)
Player of the match: Andries Gous (Islamabad United)

- Multan Sultans won the toss and elected to bat.

Match 19
30 April 2025
20:00 (N)
Scorecard

(H) Lahore Qalandars; 209/6 (20 overs)	v	Islamabad United; 121 (16.5 overs)
Fakhar Zaman 44 (30); Imad Wasim 2/26 (3 overs)		Andries Gous 41 (27); Haris Rauf 4/31 (3.5 overs)

Lahore Qalandars won by 88 runs
Gaddafi Stadium, Lahore
Umpires: Paul Reiffel (Aus) and Asif Yaqoob (Pak)
Player of the match: Sikandar Raza (Lahore Qalandars)

- Islamabad United won the toss and elected to field.

Match 22
2 May 2025
20:00 (N)
Scorecard

Islamabad United; 143/9 (20 overs)	v	Peshawar Zalmi; 147/4 (16.4 overs)
Sahibzada Farhan 36 (35); Mohammad Ali 3/26 (4 overs)		Maaz Sadaqat 55 (33); Ben Dwarshuis 1/23 (3.4 overs)

Peshawar Zalmi won by 6 wickets
Gaddafi Stadium, Lahore
Umpires: Faisal Afridi (Pak) and Alex Wharf (Eng)
Player of the match: Maaz Sadaqat (Peshawar Zalmi)

- Islamabad United won the toss and elected to bat.

Match 23
3 May 2025
20:00 (N)
Scorecard

Islamabad United; 157/9 (20 overs)	v	(H) Quetta Gladiators; 159/8 (19.5 overs)
Mohammad Nawaz 49 (34); Faheem Ashraf 4/25 (3 overs)		Hassan Nawaz 64* (41); Naseem Shah 2/31 (4 overs); Salman Irshad 2/31 (4 overs)

Quetta Gladiators won by 2 wickets
Gaddafi Stadium, Lahore
Umpires: Rashid Riaz (Pak) and Alex Wharf (Eng)
Player of the match: Hassan Nawaz (Quetta Gladiators)

- Quetta Gladiators won the toss and elected to field.
- As a result, Quetta Gladiators qualified for the playoffs.

Match 26
7 May 2025
20:00 (N)
Scorecard

Quetta Gladiators; 263/3 (20 overs)	v	(H) Islamabad United; 154 (19.3 overs)
Rilee Rossouw 104 (46); Imad Wasim 1/42 (4 overs)		Imad Wasim 56 (41); Mohammad Amir 3/6 (2 overs)

Quetta Gladiators won by 109 runs
Rawalpindi Cricket Stadium, Rawalpindi
Umpires: Faisal Afridi (Pak) and Kumar Dharmasena (SL)
Player of the match: Rilee Rossouw (Quetta Gladiators)

- Islamabad United won the toss and elected to field.
- Rilee Rossouw and Hassan Nawaz (Quetta Gladiators) became the first pair to score centuries in the same innings in PSL history.
- This was the highest total scored by a team in PSL history.

Match 30
19 May 2025
19:30 (N)
Scorecard

(H) Islamabad United; 251/5 (20 overs)	v	Karachi Kings; 172 (18.2 overs)
Alex Hales 88 (35); Mir Hamza 1/41 (4 overs)		David Warner 43 (28); Shadab Khan 4/45 (4 overs)

Islamabad United won by 79 runs
Rawalpindi Cricket Stadium, Rawalpindi
Umpires: Faisal Afridi (Pak) and Rashid Riaz (Pak)
Player of the match: Alex Hales (Islamabad United)

- Karachi Kings won the toss and elected to field.

== Playoffs ==
Qualifier
21 May – Gaddafi Stadium
1	Quetta Gladiators	209/6 (20 overs)
2	Islamabad United	179 (19.4 overs)
Eliminator 1
22 May – Gaddafi Stadium
3	Karachi Kings	190/8 (20 overs)
4	Lahore Qalandars	191/4 (18.4 overs)

Eliminator 2
23 May – Gaddafi Stadium
QL	Islamabad United	107 (15.1 overs)
E1W	Lahore Qalandars	202/8 (20 overs)

Final
25 May – Gaddafi Stadium
QW	Quetta Gladiators	201/9 (20 overs)
E2W	Lahore Qalandars	204/4 (19.5 overs)

=== Qualifier ===
Qualifier
21 May 2025
19:30 (N)
Scorecard

Quetta Gladiators; 209/6 (20 overs)	v	Islamabad United; 179 (19.4 overs)
Dinesh Chandimal 48* (28); Ben Dwarshuis 2/31 (2 overs)		Sahibzada Farhan 52 (35); Usman Tariq 3/32 (4 overs)

Quetta Gladiators won by 30 runs
Gaddafi Stadium, Lahore
Umpires: Aleem Dar (Pak) and Asif Yaqoob (Pak)
Player of the match: Faheem Ashraf (Quetta Gladiators)

- Quetta Gladiators won the toss and elected to bat.
- This match was originally scheduled in Rawalpindi Cricket Stadium.

=== Eliminator 2 ===
Eliminator 2
23 May 2025
19:30 (N)
Scorecard

Lahore Qalandars; 202/8 (20 overs)	v	Islamabad United; 107 (15.1 overs)
Kusal Perera 61 (35); Tymal Mills 3/42 (4 overs)		Salman Ali Agha 33 (26); Shaheen Afridi 3/3 (3.1 overs)

Lahore Qalandars won by 95 runs
Gaddafi Stadium, Lahore
Umpires: Faisal Afridi (Pak) and Asif Yaqoob (Pak)
Player of the match: Salman Mirza (Lahore Qalandars)

- Lahore Qalandars won the toss and elected to bat.

== Statistics ==
=== Most runs ===
Player	Inns	Runs	Ave	HS	50s	100s
Sahibzada Farhan	12	449	37.41	106	3	1
Colin Munro	7	216	36.00	59*	1	0
Salman Ali Agha	9	201	25.12	44	0	0
Shadab Khan	10	173	24.17	47	0	0
Andries Gous	6	142	28.40	80*	1	0

- Source: ESPNcricinfo

=== Most wickets ===
Player	Inns	Wkts	Ave	BBI
Jason Holder	8	15	18.73	4/25
Imad Wasim	11	14	19.85	3/26
Shadab Khan	10	14	16.57	4/45
Salman Irshad	5	9	19.33	3/28
Naseem Shah	10	9	40.33	2/29

- Source: ESPNcricinfo
