= 2025 Asia Cup final =

Cricket tournament final in the United Arab Emirates

2025 Asia Cup Final
- Event: 2025 Asia Cup
Pakistan	India
(Pakistan)	(India)
146	150/5
19.1 overs	19.4 overs
- India won by 5 wickets
- Date: 28 September 2025
- Venue: Dubai International Cricket Stadium, Dubai
- Player of the match: Tilak Varma (Ind)
- Umpires: Ahmed Shah Pakteen (Afg) and Masudur Rahman (Ban)

The 2025 Asia Cup Final was a men's T20I cricket match, played between India and Pakistan on 28 September 2025 at the Dubai International Cricket Stadium in Dubai. It was the first time that India and Pakistan were facing each other in an Asia Cup final since the competition's inception in 1984. India defeated Pakistan by 5 wickets to win their ninth title and thus retained the title.

== Background ==
The dates for the tournament were released in July 2024, with India initially set to host the tournament. However, following the Pahalgam attack in early 2025 and the subsequent escalation of political crisis and military conflict between India and Pakistan, concerns arose over the feasibility of hosting matches involving both nations in India. In July 2025, during the Asian Cricket Council's annual meeting in Dhaka, ACC chairman Mohsin Naqvi announced that the tournament would instead be held in the United Arab Emirates, with matches staged in Dubai and Abu Dhabi. The UAE was selected as a neutral venue due to its prior experience hosting high-profile multinational cricket tournaments under similar circumstances.

The 2025 edition was held in the UAE from 9 to 28 September with eleven matches in Dubai, eight in Abu Dhabi and the final in Dubai, following a schedule revision by organisers to standardise evening start times. The tournament was played in the T20I format and, while the Board of Control for Cricket in India remained the official host, matches were held in the UAE to ensure a neutral venue for fixtures involving India and Pakistan. A reserve day for the final was listed for 29 September in Dubai.

The meeting of India and Pakistan in the 2025 final was unprecedented in Asia Cup's history despite the sides having contested major finals in other competitions such as the 2007 World Twenty20, won by India, and the 2017 ICC Champions Trophy, won by Pakistan.

Before this match, both India and Pakistan have faced each other 5 times in the T20I format of Asia Cup's history, with India winning four matches while Pakistan winning one match.

== Venue ==
The final was held at the Dubai International Cricket Stadium in Dubai, on 28 September 2025. It has a capacity of 25,000.

No BCCI official travelled to Dubai.

== Road to the final ==
India opened their campaign with a victory over the hosts United Arab Emirates in Dubai, bowling them out for 57 before completing a straightforward chase. Then, they defeated arch-rivals Pakistan by 7 wickets and went on to defeat Oman in Abu Dhabi by 21 runs to seal top spot in Group A. In the Super Four, India again defeated Pakistan by six wickets at Dubai as Abhishek Sharma and Shubman Gill shared a century stand in a 172 chase, and later overcame Bangladesh by 41 runs and Sri Lanka in the super over to clinch their place in the final.

Pakistan opened their campaign with a huge victory over Oman by 93 runs, but lost the next match to India, later they defeated United Arab Emirates by 42 runs and came second in Group A. In the Super Four, they again got defeated by India, but secured qualification in the final by defeating Sri Lanka by 5 wickets and Bangladesh by 11 runs at Dubai, in a low-scoring match.

India
Titles
Pakistan
Opponent
Result
Group Stage
Opponent
Result
United Arab Emirates
Won
Match 1
Oman
Won
Pakistan
Won
Match 2
India
Lost
Oman
Won
Match 3
United Arab Emirates
Won
Final standings
Group A table

Pos	Team	Pld	W	L	NR	Pts	NRR	Qualification
1	India	3	3	0	0	6	3.547	Advanced to the Super Four
2	Pakistan	3	2	1	0	4	1.790	Advanced to the Super Four
3	United Arab Emirates (H)	3	1	2	0	2	−1.984	
4	Oman	3	0	3	0	0	−2.600	

Source: ESPNcricinfo
(H) Host
Opponent
Result
Super Four
Opponent
Result
Pakistan
Won
Match 1
India
Lost
Bangladesh
Won
Match 2
Sri Lanka
Won
Sri Lanka
Tied (Won Super Over)
Match 3
Bangladesh
Won
Super Four Table

Pos	Team	Pld	W	L	NR	Pts	NRR	Qualification
1	India	3	3	0	0	6	0.913	Advanced to the Final
2	Pakistan	3	2	1	0	4	0.329	Advanced to the Final
3	Bangladesh	3	1	2	0	2	−0.831	
4	Sri Lanka	3	0	3	0	0	−0.418	

Source: ESPNcricinfo

== Match ==
=== Match officials ===
- On-field umpires: Ahmed Shah Pakteen (Afg) and Masudur Rahman (Ban)
- Third umpire: Raveendra Wimalasiri (SL)
- Reserve umpire: Gazi Sohel (Ban)
- Match referee: Richie Richardson (WI)

=== Teams and toss ===
India's captain Suryakumar Yadav won the toss and elected to field. However, during the toss both captains did not shake hands for the third consecutive time in the tournament. Pakistan remained unchanged from the side that played the previous match while India brought Rinku Singh, Jasprit Bumrah and Shivam Dube in place of Hardik Pandya, Harshit Rana and Arshdeep Singh respectively.

=== Summary ===
28 September 2025
18:30 (N)
Scorecard

Pakistan; 146 (19.1 overs)	v	India; 150/5 (19.4 overs)
Sahibzada Farhan 57 (38); Kuldeep Yadav 4/30 (4 overs)		Tilak Varma 69* (53); Faheem Ashraf 3/29 (4 overs)

India won by 5 wickets
Dubai International Cricket Stadium, Dubai
Umpires: Ahmed Shah Pakteen (Afg) and Masudur Rahman (Ban)
Player of the match: Tilak Varma (Ind)

- India won the toss and elected to field.
- Faheem Ashraf (Pak) took his 50th wicket in T20Is.

=== Scorecard ===
1st innings

Pakistan batting
Player	Status	Runs	Balls	4s	6s	Strike rate
Sahibzada Farhan	c Tilak b Varun	57	38	5	3	150.00
Fakhar Zaman	c Yadav b Varun	46	35	2	2	131.42
Saim Ayub	c Bumrah b Yadav	14	11	2	0	127.27
Mohammad Haris	c Rinku b Patel	0	2	0	0	0.00
Salman Ali Agha	c †Samson b Yadav	8	7	0	0	114.28
Hussain Talat	c †Samson b Patel	1	2	0	0	50.00
Mohammad Nawaz	c Rinku b Bumrah	6	9	0	0	66.66
Shaheen Afridi	lbw b Yadav	0	3	0	0	0.00
Faheem Ashraf	c Tilak b Yadav	0	2	0	0	0.00
Haris Rauf	b Bumrah	6	4	1	0	150.00
Abrar Ahmed	not out	1	2	0	0	50.00
Extras	(b 1, lb 2, w 4)	7				
Total	(10 wickets; 19.1 overs)	146		10	5	RR: 7.61

Fall of wickets: 1/84 (Farhan, 9.4 ov), 2/113 (Ayub, 12.5 ov), 3/114 (Haris, 13.3 ov), 4/126 (Zaman, 14.4 ov), 5/131 (Talat, 15.3 ov), 6/133 (Salman, 16.1 ov), 7/134 (Afridi, 16.4 ov), 8/134 (Ashraf, 16.6 ov), 9/141 (Rauf, 17.5 ov), 10/146 (Nawaz, 19.1 ov)

India bowling
Bowler	Overs	Maidens	Runs	Wickets	Econ	Wides	NBs
Shivam Dube	3	0	23	0	7.66	0	0
Jasprit Bumrah	3.1	0	25	2	7.89	0	0
Varun Chakravarthy	4	0	30	2	7.50	0	0
Axar Patel	4	0	26	2	6.50	0	0
Kuldeep Yadav	4	0	30	4	7.50	4	0
Tilak Varma	1	0	9	0	9.00	0	0

2nd innings

India batting
Player	Status	Runs	Balls	4s	6s	Strike rate
Abhishek Sharma	c Rauf b Ashraf	5	6	1	0	83.33
Shubman Gill	c Rauf b Ashraf	12	10	1	0	120.00
Suryakumar Yadav	c Salman b Afridi	1	5	0	0	20.00
Tilak Varma	not out	69	53	3	4	130.18
Sanju Samson	c Farhan b Abrar	24	21	2	1	114.28
Shivam Dube	c Afridi b Ashraf	33	22	2	2	150.00
Rinku Singh	not out	4	1	1	0	400.00
Axar Patel						
Kuldeep Yadav						
Varun Chakravarthy						
Jasprit Bumrah						
Extras	(w 2)	2				
Total	(5 wickets; 19.4 overs)	150		10	7	RR: 7.62

Fall of wickets: 1/7 (Abhishek, 1.1 ov), 2/10 (Suryakumar, 2.3 ov), 3/20 (Gill, 3.6 ov), 4/77 (Samson, 12.2 ov), 5/137 (Dube, 18.6 ov)

Pakistan bowling
Bowler	Overs	Maidens	Runs	Wickets	Econ	Wides	NBs
Shaheen Afridi	4	0	20	1	5.00	0	0
Faheem Ashraf	4	0	29	3	7.25	0	0
Mohammad Nawaz	1	0	6	0	6.00	0	0
Haris Rauf	3.4	0	50	0	13.63	1	0
Abrar Ahmed	4	0	29	1	7.25	1	0
Saim Ayub	3	0	16	0	5.33	0	0

== Aftermath ==
During the post-match presentation Tilak Varma was named Player of the Match for scoring 69* runs off 53 balls while Abhishek Sharma was named Player of the Tournament for his strong batting performance throughout the tournament.

Later, BCCI announced ₹21 crore prize money for the Indian team including the players, coaches, support staff and team officials.

However, at the presentation ceremony a major controversy erupted as the Indian team refused to accept the winning trophy from ACC president Mohsin Naqvi who also serves as Pakistan's Interior Minister and Chairman of the PCB. This led to a delay in handing out awards, and the team trophy was not formally presented on stage. India's captain Suryakumar Yadav later said the side had been "denied" the opportunity to lift the trophy and criticised the handling of the ceremony. Naqvi handed the trophy to the UAE cricket authorities when the BCCI threatened to impeach him from the ACC presidency for misconduct.
