= Bangladeshi cricket team in Pakistan in 2025 =

International cricket tour

	Pakistan	Bangladesh
- Dates: 28 May – 1 June 2025
Captains	Salman Ali Agha	Litton Das

Twenty20 International series
- Results: Pakistan won the 3-match series 3–0
Most runs	Mohammad Haris (179)	Tanzid Hasan (106)
Most wickets	Hasan Ali (8)	Tanzim Hasan Sakib (4)
- Player of the series: Mohammad Haris (Pak)

The Bangladesh cricket team toured Pakistan in May and June 2025 to play the Pakistan cricket team. The tour consisted of three Twenty20 International (T20I) matches. In April 2025, the Pakistan Cricket Board (PCB) announced the schedule of the series. All the matches were played at Gaddafi Stadium in Lahore.

Originally, the tour was scheduled to include three ODIs and three T20Is under the Future Tours Programme (FTP). However, with the T20 World Cup scheduled in 2026, both the boards mutually agreed to replace the ODIs with two additional T20Is. Later, the series was again reduced to three T20Is.

== Squads ==
Pakistan	Bangladesh
Salman Ali Agha (c); Shadab Khan (vc); Abbas Afridi; Abrar Ahmed; Hasan Ali; Faheem Ashraf; Saim Ayub; Sahibzada Farhan (wk); Mohammad Haris (wk); Hassan Nawaz; Irfan Khan Niazi; Haris Rauf; Khushdil Shah; Naseem Shah; Hussain Talat; ~~Mohammad Wasim Jr.~~; Fakhar Zaman	Litton Das (c, wk); Mahedi Hasan (vc); Khaled Ahmed; Jaker Ali (wk); Mehidy Hasan Miraz; Tanzid Hasan; Parvez Hossain Emon (wk); Rishad Hossain; Shamim Hossain; Towhid Hridoy; Shoriful Islam; Tanvir Islam; Hasan Mahmud; ~~Mustafizur Rahman~~; Nahid Rana; Tanzim Hasan Sakib; ~~Soumya Sarkar~~; Najmul Hossain Shanto

On 22 May, Soumya Sarkar was ruled out of the series due to a back injury, with Mehidy Hasan Miraz named as his replacement. On 25 May, Mustafizur Rahman was ruled out of series due to a thumb injury during the 2025 IPL, with Khaled Ahmed named as his replacement.

On 27 May, Mohammad Wasim Jr. was ruled out of the series due to a side strain during the 2025 PSL, with Abbas Afridi named as his replacement.

== T20I series ==
=== 1st T20I ===
28 May 2025
20:00 (N)
Scorecard

Pakistan; 201/7 (20 overs)	v	Bangladesh; 164 (19.2 overs)
Salman Ali Agha 56 (34); Shoriful Islam 2/32 (3 overs)		Litton Das 48 (30); Hasan Ali 5/30 (3.2 overs)

Pakistan won by 37 runs
Gaddafi Stadium, Lahore
Umpires: Rashid Riaz (Pak) and Asif Yaqoob (Pak)
Player of the match: Shadab Khan (Pak)

- Pakistan won the toss and elected to bat.
- Shoriful Islam (Ban) took his 50th T20I wicket, becoming the fourth Bangladeshi bowler to achieve this milestone.
- Hasan Ali (Pak) took his first five-wicket haul in T20Is.

=== 2nd T20I ===
30 May 2025
20:00 (N)
Scorecard

Pakistan; 201/6 (20 overs)	v	Bangladesh; 144 (19 overs)
Sahibzada Farhan 74 (41); Tanzim Hasan Sakib 2/36 (4 overs)		Tanzim Hasan Sakib 50 (31); Abrar Ahmed 3/19 (4 overs)

Pakistan won by 57 runs
Gaddafi Stadium, Lahore
Umpires: Faisal Afridi (Pak) and Rashid Riaz (Pak)
Player of the match: Sahibzada Farhan (Pak)

- Pakistan won the toss and elected to bat.

=== 3rd T20I ===
1 June 2025
20:00 (N)
Scorecard

Bangladesh; 196/6 (20 overs)	v	Pakistan; 197/3 (17.2 overs)
Parvez Hossain Emon 66 (34); Abbas Afridi 2/26 (4 overs)		Mohammad Haris 107* (46); Mehidy Hasan Miraz 2/26 (3 overs)

Pakistan won by 7 wickets
Gaddafi Stadium, Lahore
Umpires: Ahsan Raza (Pak) and Asif Yaqoob (Pak)
Player of the match: Mohammad Haris (Pak)

- Pakistan won the toss and elected to field.
- Khaled Ahmed (Ban) made his T20I debut.
- Mohammad Haris (Pak) scored his maiden century in T20Is.
