= English cricket team in Pakistan in 2022–23 =

International cricket tour

	Pakistan	England
- Dates: 20 September – 21 December 2022
Captains	Babar Azam	Ben Stokes (Tests); Moeen Ali (T20Is) (Note: Although official captain Jos Buttler was named in England's squad, Ali captained England in all seven T20Is.)

Test series
- Result: England won the 3-match series 3–0
Most runs	Babar Azam (348)	Harry Brook (468)
Most wickets	Abrar Ahmed (17)	Jack Leach (15)
- Player of the series: Harry Brook (Eng)

Twenty20 International series
- Results: England won the 7-match series 4–3
Most runs	Mohammad Rizwan (316)	Harry Brook (238)
Most wickets	Haris Rauf (8)	Sam Curran (7); David Willey (7)
- Player of the series: Harry Brook (Eng)

The England cricket team toured Pakistan in September and October 2022 to play seven Twenty20 International (T20I) matches as a preparatory series before the 2022 ICC Men's T20 World Cup. The English team returned to Pakistan in December 2022 to play three Test matches. The Test matches formed part of the 2021–2023 ICC World Test Championship.

In November 2021, Tom Harrison, the Chief Executive of the England and Wales Cricket Board (ECB), flew to Pakistan to repair the relationship between the ECB and the Pakistan Cricket Board (PCB) after England's planned tour to Pakistan in October 2021 was cancelled. After positive talks, the original tour itinerary of five T20I matches was increased to seven. The T20Is were scheduled to be played first, with the Test matches taking place following the 2022 ICC Men's T20 World Cup in Australia. In April 2022, the Pakistan Cricket Board (PCB) confirmed that the series would be taking place. In July 2022, the PCB's Chairman Ramiz Raja said that the T20I matches would be likely to take place in Lahore and Karachi. The details of the T20I series was confirmed on 2 August 2022. The itinerary for the Test series was later announced on 22 August 2022.

A total of 189,595 spectators watched the T20I leg of the series, at a 97.35% crowd attendance, making it the highest-attended series in Pakistan cricket history.

On 16 December 2022, Pakistan's Azhar Ali announced that he would retire from Test cricket following the completion of the Test series.

England won the Test series 3–0, to become the first team to claim a clean sweep in a three-match series in Pakistan. This was also only the fourth time that England had taken a clean sweep in any away series of three Tests or more.

== Squads ==
Tests		T20Is	
Pakistan	England	Pakistan	England
Babar Azam (c); Mohammad Rizwan (vc, wk); Abdullah Shafique; Abrar Ahmed; Azhar Ali; Faheem Ashraf; Haris Rauf; Imam-ul-Haq; Mohammad Ali; Mohammad Nawaz; Mohammad Wasim Jnr; Naseem Shah; Nauman Ali; Salman Ali Agha; Sarfaraz Ahmed (wk); Saud Shakeel; Shan Masood; Zahid Mahmood	Ben Stokes (c); Rehan Ahmed; James Anderson; Harry Brook; Zak Crawley; Ben Duckett; Ben Foakes (wk); Will Jacks; Keaton Jennings; Jack Leach; Liam Livingstone; Jamie Overton; Ollie Pope (wk); Ollie Robinson; Joe Root; Mark Wood	Babar Azam (c); Shadab Khan (vc); Abrar Ahmed; Iftikhar Ahmed; Asif Ali; Haider Ali; Shahnawaz Dahani; Mohammad Haris; Mohammad Hasnain; Aamer Jamal; Shan Masood; Mohammad Nawaz; Usman Qadir; Haris Rauf; Mohammad Rizwan (wk); Khushdil Shah; Naseem Shah; Mohammad Wasim	Jos Buttler (c, wk); Moeen Ali (vc); Harry Brook; Jordan Cox; Sam Curran; Liam Dawson; Ben Duckett; Richard Gleeson; Alex Hales; Tom Helm; Will Jacks; Dawid Malan; Adil Rashid; Phil Salt (wk); Olly Stone; Reece Topley; David Willey; Chris Woakes; Luke Wood; Mark Wood

The ECB announced that Jos Buttler would miss the opening matches of the T20I series due to a calf injury, with Moeen Ali standing in as captain. Alex Hales was later added to the T20I squad. On 30 September, Pakistan's Naseem Shah was ruled out of the remainder of the T20I series due to COVID-19 positive result, with playing the first match only.

Rehan Ahmed was added to England's Test squad on 23 November. England's Liam Livingstone was ruled out of last two tests after sustaining a right knee injury during the first Test. On 5 December, Pakistan's Haris Rauf was ruled out of the remainder of the Test series, having sustained a quad injury in the first Test.

== Warm-up match ==
Before the Test series, England played a three-day warm-up match against England Lions in Abu Dhabi.

23–25 November 2022
Scorecard

England	v	England Lions
501/7d (79 overs); Ollie Pope 146 (120); Dan Lawrence 2/57 (10 overs)		415/9 (77 overs); Haseeb Hameed 145 (172); Jack Leach 2/69 (13 overs)

Match drawn
Tolerance Oval, Abu Dhabi

- Toss uncontested, England batted first.

== T20I series ==
=== 1st T20I ===
20 September 2022
19:30 (N)
Scorecard

Pakistan; 158/7 (20 overs)	v	England; 160/4 (19.2 overs)
Mohammad Rizwan 68 (46); Luke Wood 3/24 (4 overs)		Alex Hales 53 (40); Usman Qadir 2/36 (4 overs)

England won by 6 wickets
National Bank Cricket Arena, Karachi
Umpires: Aleem Dar (Pak) and Asif Yaqoob (Pak)
Player of the match: Luke Wood (Eng)

- England won the toss and elected to field.
- Shan Masood (Pak) and Luke Wood (Eng) both made their T20I debuts.
- Mohammad Rizwan (Pak) became the fourth Pakistani and joint fastest with Babar Azam, to score 2,000 runs in terms of innings in T20Is (52).

=== 2nd T20I ===
22 September 2022
19:30 (N)
Scorecard

England; 199/5 (20 overs)	v	Pakistan; 203/0 (19.3 overs)
Moeen Ali 55* (23); Haris Rauf 2/30 (4 overs)		Babar Azam 110* (66)

Pakistan won by 10 wickets
National Bank Cricket Arena, Karachi
Umpires: Ahsan Raza (Pak) and Rashid Riaz (Pak)
Player of the match: Babar Azam (Pak)

- England won the toss and elected to bat.
- Pakistan set a record for the highest successful chase without losing a wicket in T20Is.

=== 3rd T20I ===
23 September 2022
19:30 (N)
Scorecard

England; 221/3 (20 overs)	v	Pakistan; 158/8 (20 overs)
Harry Brook 81* (35); Usman Qadir 2/48 (4 overs)		Shan Masood 66* (40); Mark Wood 3/25 (4 overs)

England won by 63 runs
National Bank Cricket Arena, Karachi
Umpires: Faisal Afridi (Pak) and Aleem Dar (Pak)
Player of the match: Harry Brook (Eng)

- Pakistan won the toss and elected to field.
- Will Jacks (Eng) made his T20I debut.

=== 4th T20I ===
25 September 2022
19:30 (N)
Scorecard

Pakistan; 166/4 (20 overs)	v	England; 163 (19.2 overs)
Mohammad Rizwan 88 (67); Reece Topley 2/37 (4 overs)		Liam Dawson 34 (17); Haris Rauf 3/32 (4 overs)

Pakistan won by 3 runs
National Bank Cricket Arena, Karachi
Umpires: Faisal Afridi (Pak) and Asif Yaqoob (Pak)
Player of the match: Haris Rauf (Pak)

- England won the toss and elected to field.
- Olly Stone (Eng) made his T20I debut.

=== 5th T20I ===
28 September 2022
19:30 (N)
Scorecard

Pakistan; 145 (19 overs)	v	England; 139/7 (20 overs)
Mohammad Rizwan 63 (46); Mark Wood 3/20 (4 overs)		Moeen Ali 51* (37); Haris Rauf 2/41 (4 overs)

Pakistan won by 6 runs
Gaddafi Stadium, Lahore
Umpires: Aleem Dar (Pak) and Ahsan Raza (Pak)
Player of the match: Mohammad Rizwan (Pak)

- England won the toss and elected to field.
- Aamir Jamal (Pak) made his T20I debut.

=== 6th T20I ===
30 September 2022
19:30 (N)
Scorecard

Pakistan; 169/6 (20 overs)	v	England; 170/2 (14.3 overs)
Babar Azam 87* (59); Sam Curran 2/26 (4 overs)		Phil Salt 88* (41); Shadab Khan 2/34 (4 overs)

England won by 8 wickets
Gaddafi Stadium, Lahore
Umpires: Aleem Dar (Pak) and Rashid Riaz (Pak)
Player of the match: Phil Salt (Eng)

- England won the toss and elected to field.
- Mohammad Haris (Pak) made his T20I debut.
- Babar Azam (Pak) became the joint-fastest cricketer with Virat Kohli (Ind) to score 3000 runs in terms of innings in T20Is (81).

=== 7th T20I ===
2 October 2022
19:30 (N)
Scorecard

England; 209/3 (20 overs)	v	Pakistan; 142/8 (20 overs)
Dawid Malan 78* (47); Mohammad Hasnain 1/32 (4 overs)		Shan Masood 56 (43); Chris Woakes 3/26 (4 overs)

England won by 67 runs
Gaddafi Stadium, Lahore
Umpires: Ahsan Raza (Pak) and Asif Yaqoob (Pak)
Player of the match: Dawid Malan (Eng)

- Pakistan won the toss and elected to field.

== Test series ==
=== 1st Test ===
1–5 December 2022
Scorecard

England	v	Pakistan
657 (101 overs); Harry Brook 153 (116); Zahid Mahmood 4/235 (35 overs)		579 (155.3 overs); Babar Azam 136 (168); Will Jacks 6/161 (40.3 overs)
264/7d (35.5 overs); Harry Brook 87 (65); Mohammad Ali 2/64 (10 overs)		268 (96.3 overs); Saud Shakeel 76 (159); James Anderson 4/36 (24 overs)

England won by 74 runs
Rawalpindi Cricket Stadium, Rawalpindi
Umpires: Ahsan Raza (Pak) and Joel Wilson (WI)
Player of the match: Ollie Robinson (Eng)

- England won the toss and elected to bat.
- 15 overs of play was lost on Day 1 due to bad light.
- Saud Shakeel, Haris Rauf, Mohammad Ali, Zahid Mahmood (Pak), Liam Livingstone and Will Jacks (Eng) all made their Test debuts.
- Ben Duckett and Harry Brook (Eng) both scored their maiden Test centuries.
- Zak Crawley's century was the fastest Test century by an English opener in terms of balls (86).
- Four English players scored centuries on Day 1, the most centuries scored within the first day of a test.
- England scored 506 runs on Day 1, the most runs scored in the first day of a Test match.
- England's first innings score was made at 6.50 runs per over, the highest run rate for a score of 500 or more in Test cricket.
- The teams' combined 1,768 runs was the highest aggregate in a five-day Test match, surpassing the previous record of 1,764 during the Adelaide Test of the West Indies' tour of Australia from 24–29 January 1969.
- World Test Championship points: England 12, Pakistan 0.

=== 2nd Test ===
9–13 December 2022 (Note: While five days of play were scheduled for each Test, the second and third Tests reached a result in four days.)
Scorecard

England	v	Pakistan
281 (51.4 overs); Ben Duckett 63 (49); Abrar Ahmed 7/114 (22 overs)		202 (62.5 overs); Babar Azam 75 (95); Jack Leach 4/98 (27 overs)
275 (64.5 overs); Harry Brook 108 (149); Abrar Ahmed 4/120 (29 overs)		328 (102.1 overs); Saud Shakeel 94 (213); Mark Wood 4/65 (21 overs)

England won by 26 runs
Multan Cricket Stadium, Multan
Umpires: Aleem Dar (Pak) and Marais Erasmus (SA)
Player of the match: Harry Brook (Eng)

- England won the toss and elected to bat.
- Abrar Ahmed (Pak) made his Test debut.
- England scored 180 runs in the morning session on Day 1, the most runs scored in the opening session of a Test match.
- Abrar Ahmed became the first Pakistani bowler to five-wicket haul in the opening session of a test match. He also became the thirteenth Pakistani bowler to take five-wicket haul on test debut.
- Abrar Ahmed became the second Pakistani bowler to take a ten-wicket haul in his maiden Test match.
- World Test Championship points: England 12, Pakistan 0.

=== 3rd Test ===
17–21 December 2022
Scorecard

Pakistan	v	England
304 (79 overs); Babar Azam 78 (123); Jack Leach 4/140 (31 overs)		354 (81.4 overs); Harry Brook 111 (150); Nauman Ali 4/126 (30 overs)
216 (74.5 overs); Babar Azam 54 (104); Rehan Ahmed 5/48 (14.5 overs)		170/2 (28.1 overs); Ben Duckett 82* (78); Abrar Ahmed 2/78 (12 overs)

England won by 8 wickets
National Bank Cricket Arena, Karachi
Umpires: Ahsan Raza (Pak) and Joel Wilson (WI)
Player of the match: Harry Brook (Eng)

- Pakistan won the toss and elected to bat.
- Mohammad Wasim (Pak) and Rehan Ahmed (Eng) both made their Test debuts.
- Rehan Ahmed became the youngest male cricketer for England to play in a test match, achieving the milestone at the age of 18 years and 126 days.
- Rehan Ahmed took his first five-wicket haul in Tests, and became the youngest debutant to pick five-wicket haul in men’s Tests at the age of 18 years and 126 days.
- Ben Stokes (Eng) passed Steve Waugh's record for most Test runs scored at no. 6, with 3181.
- World Test Championship points: England 12, Pakistan 0.
