= Pakistani cricket team in Australia in 2024–25 =

International cricket tour

	Australia	Pakistan
- Dates: 4 – 18 November 2024
Captains	Pat Cummins (Note: Josh Inglis captained Australia in the third ODI.) (ODIs); Josh Inglis (T20Is)	Mohammad Rizwan

One Day International series
- Results: Pakistan won the 3-match series 2–1
Most runs	Steve Smith (79)	Saim Ayub (125)
Most wickets	Mitchell Starc (3); Adam Zampa (3)	Haris Rauf (10)
- Player of the series: Haris Rauf (Pak)

Twenty20 International series
- Results: Australia won the 3-match series 3–0
Most runs	Marcus Stoinis (96)	Usman Khan (59)
Most wickets	Spencer Johnson (8)	Abbas Afridi (6)
- Player of the series: Spencer Johnson (Aus)

The Pakistan cricket team toured Australia in November 2024 to play the Australia cricket team. The tour consisted of three One Day International (ODI) and three Twenty20 International (T20I) matches. In March 2024, the Cricket Australia (CA) confirmed the fixtures for the tour, as a part of the 2024–25 home international season.

== Squads ==
Australia		Pakistan	
ODIs	T20Is	ODIs	T20Is
Pat Cummins (c) (Note: In squad for first and second ODI only.); Josh Inglis (vc, wk); Sean Abbott; Xavier Bartlett (Note: In squad for third ODI only.); Cooper Connolly; Jake Fraser-McGurk; Aaron Hardie; Josh Hazlewood (Note: In squad for second ODI only.); Spencer Johnson; Marnus Labuschagne; Glenn Maxwell; Lance Morris; Josh Philippe; Matthew Short; Steve Smith; Mitchell Starc; Marcus Stoinis; Adam Zampa	Josh Inglis (c, wk); Sean Abbott; Xavier Bartlett; ~~Cooper Connolly~~; Tim David; Nathan Ellis; Jake Fraser-McGurk; Aaron Hardie; Spencer Johnson; Glenn Maxwell; Matthew Short; Marcus Stoinis; Adam Zampa	Mohammad Rizwan (c, wk); Salman Ali Agha (vc); Shaheen Afridi; Faisal Akram; Saim Ayub; Babar Azam; Kamran Ghulam; Mohammad Hasnain; Haseebullah Khan (wk); Irfan Khan; Aamir Jamal; Arafat Minhas; Haris Rauf; Abdullah Shafique; Naseem Shah	Mohammad Rizwan (c, wk); Salman Ali Agha (vc); Abbas Afridi; Shaheen Afridi; Babar Azam; Sahibzada Farhan; Haseebullah Khan (wk); Irfan Khan; Jahandad Khan; Usman Khan; Arafat Minhas; Sufiyan Muqeem; Haris Rauf; Naseem Shah; Omair Yousuf

Cricket Australia named Josh Inglis as interim captain for the T20I series against Pakistan. Captain Pat Cummins, Steve Smith, Josh Hazlewood, Marnus Labuschagne and Mitchell Starc were all rested for the third ODI, to prepare for the Border–Gavaskar Trophy, with pacers Xavier Bartlett, Spencer Johnson and wicketkeeper-batter Josh Philippe added to the squad and Lance Morris named as cover. In the absence of Pat Cummins, Josh Inglis was named captain of Australia in the third and final ODI. On 10 November, Cooper Connolly was ruled out of the T20I series due to a hand fracture.

== ODI series ==
=== 1st ODI ===
4 November 2024
14:30 (D/N)
Scorecard

Pakistan; 203 (46.4 overs)	v	Australia; 8/204 (33.3 overs)
Mohammad Rizwan 44 (71); Mitchell Starc 3/33 (10 overs)		Josh Inglis 49 (42); Haris Rauf 3/67 (9 overs)

Australia won by 2 wickets
Melbourne Cricket Ground, Melbourne
Umpires: Chris Brown (NZ) and Sam Nogajski (Aus)
Player of the match: Mitchell Starc (Aus)

- Australia won the toss and elected to field.
- Saim Ayub and Irfan Khan (Pak) both made their ODI debuts.
- Mohammad Rizwan captained Pakistan for the first time in ODIs.

=== 2nd ODI ===
8 November 2024
14:00 (D/N)
Scorecard

Australia; 163 (35 overs)	v	Pakistan; 1/169 (26.3 overs)
Steve Smith 35 (48); Haris Rauf 5/29 (8 overs)		Saim Ayub 82 (71); Adam Zampa 1/44 (6.3 overs)

Pakistan won by 9 wickets
Adelaide Oval, Adelaide
Umpires: Chris Gaffaney (NZ) and Sam Nogajski (Aus)
Player of the match: Haris Rauf (Pak)

- Pakistan won the toss and elected to field.

=== 3rd ODI ===
10 November 2024
11:30
Scorecard

Australia; 140 (31.5 overs)	v	Pakistan; 2/143 (26.5 overs)
Sean Abbott 30 (41); Shaheen Afridi 3/32 (8.5 overs)		Saim Ayub 42 (52); Lance Morris 2/24 (6 overs)

Pakistan won by 8 wickets
Perth Stadium, Perth
Umpires: Chris Brown (NZ) and Shaun Haig (NZ)
Player of the match: Haris Rauf (Pak)

- Pakistan won the toss and elected to field.
- Josh Inglis captained Australia for the first time in ODIs.

== T20I series ==
=== 1st T20I ===
14 November 2024
18:00 (N)
Scorecard

Australia; 4/93 (7 overs)	v	Pakistan; 9/64 (7 overs)
Glenn Maxwell 42 (19); Abbas Afridi 2/9 (1 over)		Abbas Afridi 20* (10); Nathan Ellis 3/9 (2 overs)

Australia won by 29 runs
The Gabba, Brisbane
Umpires: Phillip Gillespie (Aus) and Donovan Koch (Aus)
Player of the match: Glenn Maxwell (Aus)

- Pakistan won the toss and elected to field.
- The match was reduced to 7 overs per side due to rain.
- Salman Ali Agha (Pak) made his T20I debut.
- Josh Inglis captained Australia for the first time in T20Is.
- Mohammad Rizwan captained Pakistan for the first time in T20Is.

=== 2nd T20I ===
16 November 2024
19:00 (N)
Scorecard

Australia; 9/147 (20 overs)	v	Pakistan; 134 (19.4 overs)
Matthew Short 32 (17); Haris Rauf 4/22 (4 overs)		Usman Khan 52 (38); Spencer Johnson 5/26 (4 overs)

Australia won by 13 runs
Sydney Cricket Ground, Sydney
Umpires: Shaun Haig (NZ) and Donovan Koch (Aus)
Player of the match: Spencer Johnson (Aus)

- Australia won the toss and elected to bat.
- Spencer Johnson (Aus) took his first five-wicket haul in T20Is.

=== 3rd T20I ===
18 November 2024
19:00 (N)
Scorecard

Pakistan; 117 (18.1 overs)	v	Australia; 3/118 (11.2 overs)
Babar Azam 41 (28); Aaron Hardie 3/21 (4 overs)		Marcus Stoinis 61* (27); Abbas Afridi 1/14 (1.2 overs)

Australia won by 7 wickets
Bellerive Oval, Hobart
Umpires: Shawn Craig (Aus) and Sam Nogajski (Aus)
Player of the match: Marcus Stoinis (Aus)

- Pakistan won the toss and elected to bat.
- Jahandad Khan (Pak) made his T20I debut.
- Salman Ali Agha captained Pakistan for the first time in T20Is.
