= 2025 Asia Cup =

- Dates: 9 – 28 September 2025
- Administrator: Asian Cricket Council
- Cricket format: Twenty20 International
- Tournament format(s): Group stage and knockout
- Host: United Arab Emirates
- Champions: India (9th title)
- Runners-up: Pakistan
- Participants: 8
- Matches: 19
- Player of the series: (India) Abhishek Sharma
- Most runs: (India) Abhishek Sharma (314)
- Most wickets: (India) Kuldeep Yadav (17)
- Official website: asiancricket.org

The 2025 Asia Cup (also known as DP World Asia Cup for sponsorship reasons) was the 17th edition of the Asia Cup cricket tournament. It took place in the United Arab Emirates (UAE) from 9 to 28 September 2025. The matches were played in the Twenty20 International (T20I) format. India was the defending champions of 2023.

The tournament featured eight teams. The five full members of the Asian Cricket Council, Afghanistan, Bangladesh, India, Pakistan, and Sri Lanka automatically qualified for the tournament and were joined by United Arab Emirates, Oman and Hong Kong, the teams which finished in the top three in the 2024 ACC Men's Premier Cup. In the final, India defeated Pakistan by 5 wickets to win their ninth title, and thus retained the title.

== Background ==
The dates for the tournament were released in July 2024, with India initially set to act as host. However, following the Pahalgam attack in early 2025 and the subsequent escalation of political crisis and military conflict between India and Pakistan, concerns arose over the feasibility of hosting matches involving both nations in India. In July 2025, during the Asian Cricket Council's annual meeting in Dhaka, ACC chairman Mohsin Naqvi announced that the tournament would instead be held in the United Arab Emirates, with matches staged in Dubai and Abu Dhabi. The UAE was selected as a neutral venue due to its prior experience hosting high-profile multinational cricket tournaments under similar circumstances.

== Format ==
The tournament was played with eight teams split into two groups of four. The top two teams from each group advanced to a single-group Super Four stage, and the top two teams from this stage contested the final.

== Teams and qualification ==
Qualified for Asia Cup as full members Qualified through 2024 Premier Cup Failed to qualify

The five full members of the Asian Cricket Council qualified automatically for the tournament. The United Arab Emirates, Oman and Hong Kong qualified following their top-three finish at the 2024 ACC Premier Cup.

Means of qualification	Date	Hosts	Berth(s)	Qualified
ICC Full Member	—N/a	—N/a	5	Afghanistan
ICC Full Member	—N/a	—N/a	5	Bangladesh
ICC Full Member	—N/a	—N/a	5	India
ICC Full Member	—N/a	—N/a	5	Pakistan
ICC Full Member	—N/a	—N/a	5	Sri Lanka
2024 ACC Premier Cup	12–21 April 2024	Oman	3	United Arab Emirates
2024 ACC Premier Cup	12–21 April 2024	Oman	3	Oman
2024 ACC Premier Cup	12–21 April 2024	Oman	3	Hong Kong
Total			8	

== Squads ==
Afghanistan	Bangladesh	Hong Kong	India	Oman	Pakistan	Sri Lanka	United Arab Emirates
Rashid Khan (c); Fareed Ahmad; Noor Ahmad; Abdullah Ahmadzai; Sediqullah Atal; Sharafuddin Ashraf; Fazalhaq Farooqi; Allah Mohammad Ghazanfar; Rahmanullah Gurbaz (wk); ~~Naveen-ul-Haq~~; Mohammad Ishaq (wk); Karim Janat; Gulbadin Naib; Mohammad Nabi; Azmatullah Omarzai; Mujeeb Ur Rahman; Darwish Rasooli; Ibrahim Zadran	Litton Das (c, wk); Nasum Ahmed; Taskin Ahmed; Jaker Ali (wk); Parvez Hossain Emon; Nurul Hasan (wk); Tanzid Hasan; Tanzim Hasan Sakib; Saif Hassan; Rishad Hossain; Shamim Hossain; Towhid Hridoy; Shoriful Islam; Mahedi Hasan; Mustafizur Rahman; Mohammad Saifuddin	Yasim Murtaza (c); Babar Hayat (vc); Zeeshan Ali (wk); Haroon Arshad; Kalhan Challu; Martin Coetzee; Mohammad Ghazanfar; Ali Hassan; Ateeq Iqbal; Aizaz Khan; Anas Khan; Ehsan Khan; Nizakat Khan; Adil Mehmood; Nasrulla Rana; Anshuman Rath; Kinchit Shah; Ayush Shukla; Mohammad Waheed; Shahid Wasif (wk)	Suryakumar Yadav (c); Shubman Gill (vc); Abhishek Sharma; Tilak Varma; Hardik Pandya; Shivam Dube; Axar Patel; Jitesh Sharma (wk); Jasprit Bumrah; Arshdeep Singh; Varun Chakravarthy; Kuldeep Yadav; Sanju Samson (wk); Harshit Rana; Rinku Singh	Jatinder Singh (c); Shakeel Ahmed; Wasim Ali; Aryan Bisht; Shah Faisal; Muhammed Imran; Zikria Islam; Aamir Kaleem; Nadeem Khan; Sufyan Mehmood; Hammad Mirza; Mohammad Nadeem; Ashish Odedara; Jiten Ramanandi; Hassnain Shah; Samay Shrivastava; Vinayak Shukla (wk); Karan Sonavale; Sufyan Yousuf (wk)	Salman Ali Agha (c); Shaheen Afridi; Abrar Ahmed; Hasan Ali; Faheem Ashraf; Saim Ayub; Sahibzada Farhan; Mohammad Haris (wk); Salman Mirza; Sufiyan Muqeem; Hassan Nawaz; Mohammad Nawaz; Haris Rauf; Khushdil Shah; Hussain Talat; Mohammad Wasim Jr.; Fakhar Zaman	Charith Asalanka (c); Dushmantha Chameera; Binura Fernando; Nuwanidu Fernando; Wanindu Hasaranga; Chamika Karunaratne; Janith Liyanage; Kamindu Mendis; Kusal Mendis (wk); Kamil Mishara; Pathum Nissanka; Matheesha Pathirana; Kusal Perera (wk); Dasun Shanaka; Maheesh Theekshana; Nuwan Thushara; Dunith Wellalage	Muhammad Waseem (c); Haider Ali; Rahul Chopra (wk); Ethan D'Souza; Muhammad Farooq; Muhammad Jawadullah; Harshit Kaushik; Asif Khan; Matiullah Khan; Saghir Khan; Dhruv Parashar; Muhammad Rohid; Alishan Sharafu; Aryansh Sharma (wk); Junaid Siddique; Simranjeet Singh; Muhammad Zohaib

On 9 September, Janith Liyanage was added to the Sri Lanka squad.

On 15 September, Naveen-ul-Haq was ruled out of the tournament due to a shoulder injury, and was replaced by Abdullah Ahmadzai.

== Venues ==
The ACC announced the venues of the tournament on 2 August 2025.

Dubai	Abu Dhabi
Dubai International Cricket Stadium	Sheikh Zayed Cricket Stadium
Coordinates: 25°2′48″N 55°13′8″E	Coordinates: 24°23′47″N 54°32′26″E
Capacity: 25,000	Capacity: 20,000
Matches: 11	Matches: 8

== Match officials ==
International Cricket Council (ICC) and Asian Cricket Council (ACC) jointly appointed the following match officials for the tournament.

=== Match referees ===
- (Zimbabwe) Andy Pycroft
- (Cricket West Indies) Richie Richardson

=== Umpires ===
- (Afghanistan) Izatullah Safi
- (Afghanistan) Ahmed Shah Pakteen
- (Bangladesh) Masudur Rahman
- (Bangladesh) Gazi Sohel
- (India) Rohan Pandit
- (India) Virender Sharma
- (Pakistan) Faisal Afridi
- (Pakistan) Asif Yaqoob
- (Sri Lanka) Raveendra Wimalasiri
- (Sri Lanka) Ruchira Palliyaguruge

== Tour matches ==
Hong Kong and Oman played each other in 2 unofficial 20-over matches prior to the Asia Cup.

5 September 2025
18:30 (N)
Scorecard

Oman; 211/6 (20 overs)	v	Hong Kong; 167/7 (20 overs)
Hammad Mirza 69 (36); Yasim Murtaza 2/30 (4 overs)		Anshuman Rath 42 (23); Hassnain Shah 2/9 (2 overs)

Oman won by 44 runs
Oman Cricket Academy Ground, Al Amarat

6 September 2025
Scorecard

Hong Kong; 154/7 (20 overs)	v	Oman; 157/5 (18.2 overs)
Zeeshan Ali 45 (31); Samay Shrivastava 2/19 (4 overs)		Hammad Mirza 60 (37); Ehsan Khan 2/24 (4 overs)

Oman won by 5 wickets
Oman Cricket Academy Ground, Al Amarat

== Group stage ==
The ACC released the full fixtures of the tournament on 26 July 2025.

=== Group A ===
Pos	Team	Pld	W	L	NR	Pts	NRR	Qualification
1	India	3	3	0	0	6	3.547	Advanced to the Super Four
2	Pakistan	3	2	1	0	4	1.790	Advanced to the Super Four
3	United Arab Emirates (H)	3	1	2	0	2	−1.984	
4	Oman	3	0	3	0	0	−2.600	

Source: ESPNcricinfo
(H) Host

10 September 2025
18:30 (N)
Scorecard

United Arab Emirates; 57 (13.1 overs)	v	India; 60/1 (4.3 overs)
Alishan Sharafu 22 (17); Kuldeep Yadav 4/7 (2.1 overs)		Abhishek Sharma 30 (16); Junaid Siddique 1/16 (1 over)

India won by 9 wickets
Dubai International Cricket Stadium, Dubai
Umpires: Izatullah Safi (Afg) and Gazi Sohel (Ban)
Player of the match: Kuldeep Yadav (Ind)

- India won the toss and elected to field.

12 September 2025
18:30 (N)
Scorecard

Pakistan; 160/7 (20 overs)	v	Oman; 67 (16.4 overs)
Mohammad Haris 66 (43); Aamir Kaleem 3/31 (4 overs)		Hammad Mirza 27 (23); Faheem Ashraf 2/6 (2 overs)

Pakistan won by 93 runs
Dubai International Cricket Stadium, Dubai
Umpires: Ahmed Shah Pakteen (Afg) and Masudur Rahman (Ban)
Player of the match: Mohammad Haris (Pak)

- Pakistan won the toss and elected to bat.
- This was the first time Oman and Pakistan faced each other in T20Is.
- Shah Faisal and Zikria Islam (Oma) both made their T20I debuts.

14 September 2025
18:30 (N)
Scorecard

Pakistan; 127/9 (20 overs)	v	India; 131/3 (15.5 overs)
Sahibzada Farhan 40 (44); Kuldeep Yadav 3/18 (4 overs)		Suryakumar Yadav 47* (37); Saim Ayub 3/35 (4 overs)

India won by 7 wickets
Dubai International Cricket Stadium, Dubai
Umpires: Ruchira Palliyaguruge (SL) and Masudur Rahman (Ban)
Player of the match: Kuldeep Yadav (Ind)

- Pakistan won the toss and elected to bat.

15 September 2025
16:00 (D/N)
Scorecard

United Arab Emirates; 172/5 (20 overs)	v	Oman; 130 (18.4 overs)
Muhammad Waseem 69 (54); Jiten Ramanandi 2/24 (4 overs)		Aryan Bisht 24 (32); Junaid Siddique 4/23 (4 overs)

United Arab Emirates won by 42 runs
Sheikh Zayed Cricket Stadium, Abu Dhabi
Umpires: Virender Sharma (Ind) and Asif Yaqoob (Pak)
Player of the match: Alishan Sharafu (UAE)

- Oman won the toss and elected to field.
- Aryan Bisht (Oma) made his T20I debut.
- It was the 100th T20I match for Oman.
- Muhammad Waseem (UAE) scored his 3,000th run in T20Is.
- India qualified for the Super Four while Oman were eliminated as a result of this match.

17 September 2025
19:30 (N)
Scorecard

Pakistan; 146/9 (20 overs)	v	United Arab Emirates; 105 (17.4 overs)
Fakhar Zaman 50 (36); Junaid Siddique 4/18 (4 overs)		Rahul Chopra 35 (35); Abrar Ahmed 2/13 (4 overs)

Pakistan won by 41 runs
Dubai International Cricket Stadium, Dubai
Umpires: Ahmed Shah Pakteen (Afg) and Ruchira Palliyaguruge (SL)
Player of the match: Shaheen Afridi (Pak)

- United Arab Emirates won the toss and elected to field.
- The match was delayed by an hour due to PCB's protest over the India–Pakistan handshake controversy involving match referee Andy Pycroft.
- Pakistan qualified for the Super Four while United Arab Emirates were eliminated as a result of this match.

19 September 2025
18:30 (N)
Scorecard

India; 188/8 (20 overs)	v	Oman; 167/4 (20 overs)
Sanju Samson 56 (45); Shah Faisal 2/23 (4 overs)		Aamir Kaleem 64 (46); Kuldeep Yadav 1/23 (3 overs)

India won by 21 runs
Sheikh Zayed Cricket Stadium, Abu Dhabi
Umpires: Faisal Afridi (Pak) and Raveendra Wimalasiri (SL)
Player of the match: Sanju Samson (Ind)

- India won the toss and elected to bat.
- This was the first time India and Oman faced each other in T20Is.
- It was the 250th T20I match for India.
- Arshdeep Singh became the first Indian bowler to take 100 wickets in T20Is.

=== Group B ===
Pos	Team	Pld	W	L	NR	Pts	NRR	Qualification
1	Sri Lanka	3	3	0	0	6	1.278	Advanced to the Super Four
2	Bangladesh	3	2	1	0	4	−0.270	Advanced to the Super Four
3	Afghanistan	3	1	2	0	2	1.241	
4	Hong Kong	3	0	3	0	0	−2.151	

Source: ESPNcricinfo

9 September 2025
18:30 (N)
Scorecard

Afghanistan; 188/6 (20 overs)	v	Hong Kong; 94/9 (20 overs)
Sediqullah Atal 73* (52); Kinchit Shah 2/24 (3 overs)		Babar Hayat 39 (43); Gulbadin Naib 2/8 (3 overs)

Afghanistan won by 94 runs
Sheikh Zayed Cricket Stadium, Abu Dhabi
Umpires: Virender Sharma (Ind) and Asif Yaqoob (Pak)
Player of the match: Azmatullah Omarzai (Afg)

- Afghanistan won the toss and elected to bat.
- Azmatullah Omarzai (Afg) recorded the fastest half-century (20 balls) for Afghanistan.

11 September 2025
18:30 (N)
Scorecard

Hong Kong; 143/7 (20 overs)	v	Bangladesh; 144/3 (17.4 overs)
Nizakat Khan 42 (40); Tanzim Hasan Sakib 2/21 (4 overs)		Litton Das 59 (39); Ateeq Iqbal 2/14 (3.4 overs)

Bangladesh won by 7 wickets
Sheikh Zayed Cricket Stadium, Abu Dhabi
Umpires: Rohan Pandit (Ind) and Raveendra Wimalasiri (SL)
Player of the match: Litton Das (Ban)

- Bangladesh won the toss and elected to field.
- Rishad Hossain (Ban) and Ayush Shukla (HK) both took their 50th wicket in T20Is.
- Litton Das hit his 78th six in T20Is, the most for Bangladesh, surpassing Mahmudullah.
- Hong Kong were eliminated as a result of this match.

13 September 2025
18:30 (N)
Scorecard

Bangladesh; 139/5 (20 overs)	v	Sri Lanka; 140/4 (14.4 overs)
Shamim Hossain 42* (34); Wanindu Hasaranga 2/24 (4 overs)		Pathum Nissanka 50 (34); Mahedi Hasan 2/29 (4 overs)

Sri Lanka won by 6 wickets
Sheikh Zayed Cricket Stadium, Abu Dhabi
Umpires: Faisal Afridi (Pak) and Rohan Pandit (Ind)
Player of the match: Kamil Mishara (SL)

- Sri Lanka won the toss and elected to field.
- Pathum Nissanka (SL) scored his 2,000th run in T20Is.

15 September 2025
18:30 (N)
Scorecard

Hong Kong; 149/4 (20 overs)	v	Sri Lanka; 153/6 (18.5 overs)
Nizakat Khan 52* (38); Dushmantha Chameera 2/29 (4 overs)		Pathum Nissanka 68 (44); Yasim Murtaza 2/37 (4 overs)

Sri Lanka won by 4 wickets
Dubai International Cricket Stadium, Dubai
Umpires: Izatullah Safi (Afg) and Gazi Sohel (Ban)
Player of the match: Pathum Nissanka (SL)

- Sri Lanka won the toss and elected to field.
- This was the first time Hong Kong and Sri Lanka faced each other in any format in international cricket.

16 September 2025
18:30 (N)
Scorecard

Bangladesh; 154/5 (20 overs)	v	Afghanistan; 146 (20 overs)
Tanzid Hasan 52 (31); Noor Ahmad 2/23 (4 overs)		Rahmanullah Gurbaz 35 (31); Mustafizur Rahman 3/28 (4 overs)

Bangladesh won by 8 runs
Sheikh Zayed Cricket Stadium, Abu Dhabi
Umpires: Faisal Afridi (Pak) and Raveendra Wimalasiri (SL)
Player of the match: Nasum Ahmed (Ban)

- Bangladesh won the toss and elected to bat.
- It was the 200th T20I match for Bangladesh.

18 September 2025
18:30 (N)
Scorecard

Afghanistan; 169/8 (20 overs)	v	Sri Lanka; 171/4 (18.4 overs)
Mohammad Nabi 60 (22); Nuwan Thushara 4/18 (4 overs)		Kusal Mendis 74* (52); Azmatullah Omarzai 1/10 (2 overs)

Sri Lanka won by 6 wickets
Sheikh Zayed Cricket Stadium, Abu Dhabi
Umpires: Virender Sharma (Ind) and Asif Yaqoob (Pak)
Player of the match: Kusal Mendis (SL)

- Afghanistan won the toss and elected to bat.
- Mohammad Nabi equalled Azmatullah Omarzai's record for the fastest half-century (20 balls) for Afghanistan.
- Bangladesh and Sri Lanka qualified for the Super Four while Afghanistan were eliminated as a result of this match.

== Super Four ==
Pos	Team	Pld	W	L	NR	Pts	NRR	Qualification
1	India	3	3	0	0	6	0.913	Advanced to the Final
2	Pakistan	3	2	1	0	4	0.329	Advanced to the Final
3	Bangladesh	3	1	2	0	2	−0.831	
4	Sri Lanka	3	0	3	0	0	−0.418	

Source: ESPNcricinfo

20 September 2025
18:30 (N)
Scorecard

Sri Lanka; 168/7 (20 overs)	v	Bangladesh; 169/6 (19.5 overs)
Dasun Shanaka 64* (37); Mustafizur Rahman 3/20 (4 overs)		Saif Hassan 61 (45); Dasun Shanaka 2/21 (2.5 overs)

Bangladesh won by 4 wickets
Dubai International Cricket Stadium, Dubai
Umpires: Rohan Pandit (Ind) and Asif Yaqoob (Pak)
Player of the match: Saif Hassan (Ban)

- Bangladesh won the toss and elected to field.
- Towhid Hridoy (Ban) played in his 50th T20I match, and scored his 1,000th run in T20Is.
- Litton Das surpassed Shakib Al Hasan's 2551 runs and became the highest run scorer for Bangladesh in T20Is.
- Kusal Mendis surpassed Kumar Sangakkara's 45 dismissals and has recorded the most number of dismissals for Sri Lanka in T20Is.

21 September 2025
18:30 (N)
Scorecard

Pakistan; 171/5 (20 overs)	v	India; 174/4 (18.5 overs)
Sahibzada Farhan 58 (45); Shivam Dube 2/33 (4 overs)		Abhishek Sharma 74 (39); Haris Rauf 2/26 (4 overs)

India won by 6 wickets
Dubai International Cricket Stadium, Dubai
Umpires: Ahmed Shah Pakteen (Afg) and Gazi Sohel (Ban)
Player of the match: Abhishek Sharma (Ind)

- India won the toss and elected to field.

23 September 2025
18:30 (N)
Scorecard

Sri Lanka; 133/8 (20 overs)	v	Pakistan; 138/5 (18 overs)
Kamindu Mendis 50 (44); Shaheen Afridi 3/28 (4 overs)		Mohammad Nawaz 38* (24); Maheesh Theekshana 2/24 (4 overs)

Pakistan won by 5 wickets
Sheikh Zayed Cricket Stadium, Abu Dhabi
Umpires: Masudur Rahman (Ban) and Izatullah Safi (Afg)
Player of the match: Hussain Talat (Pak)

- Pakistan won the toss and elected to field.

24 September 2025
18:30 (N)
Scorecard

India; 168/6 (20 overs)	v	Bangladesh; 127 (19.3 overs)
Abhishek Sharma 75 (37); Rishad Hossain 2/27 (3 overs)		Saif Hassan 69 (51); Kuldeep Yadav 3/18 (4 overs)

India won by 41 runs
Dubai International Cricket Stadium, Dubai
Umpires: Ruchira Palliyaguruge (SL) and Ahmed Shah Pakteen (Afg)
Player of the match: Abhishek Sharma (Ind)

- Bangladesh won the toss and elected to field.
- Jaker Ali captained Bangladesh for the first time in T20Is.
- Mustafizur Rahman (Ban) took his 150th wicket in T20Is and surpassed Shakib Al Hasan's 149 wickets to become the highest wicket-taker for Bangladesh in T20Is.
- India qualified for the final while Sri Lanka were eliminated as a result of this match.

25 September 2025
18:30 (N)
Scorecard

Pakistan; 135/8 (20 overs)	v	Bangladesh; 124/9 (20 overs)
Mohammad Haris 31 (23); Taskin Ahmed 3/28 (4 overs)		Shamim Hossain 30 (25); Shaheen Afridi 3/17 (4 overs)

Pakistan won by 11 runs
Dubai International Cricket Stadium, Dubai
Umpires: Ahmed Shah Pakteen (Afg) and Raveendra Wimalasiri (SL)
Player of the match: Shaheen Afridi (Pak)

- Bangladesh won the toss and elected to field.
- Taskin Ahmed (Ban) took his 100th wicket in T20Is.
- Pakistan qualified for the final while Bangladesh were eliminated as a result of this match.

26 September 2025
18:30 (N)
Scorecard

India; 202/5 (20 overs)	v	Sri Lanka; 202/5 (20 overs)
Abhishek Sharma 61 (31); Charith Asalanka 1/18 (2 overs)		Pathum Nissanka 107 (58); Hardik Pandya 1/7 (1 over)

Match tied (India won the Super Over)
Dubai International Cricket Stadium, Dubai
Umpires: Izatullah Safi (Afg) and Gazi Sohel (Ban)
Player of the match: Pathum Nissanka (SL)

- Sri Lanka won the toss and elected to field.
- Pathum Nissanka (SL) scored his maiden century in T20Is.
- Super Over: Sri Lanka 2/2, India 3/0

== Final ==
28 September 2025
18:30 (N)
Scorecard

Pakistan; 146 (19.1 overs)	v	India; 150/5 (19.4 overs)
Sahibzada Farhan 57 (38); Kuldeep Yadav 4/30 (4 overs)		Tilak Varma 69* (53); Faheem Ashraf 3/29 (4 overs)

India won by 5 wickets
Dubai International Cricket Stadium, Dubai
Umpires: Ahmed Shah Pakteen (Afg) and Masudur Rahman (Ban)
Player of the match: Tilak Varma (Ind)

- India won the toss and elected to field.
- Faheem Ashraf (Pak) took his 50th wicket in T20Is.

== Statistics ==
=== Most runs ===
Runs	Player	Inns.	Avg	SR	HS	100s	50s	4s	6s
314	(India) Abhishek Sharma	7	44.85	200.00	75	–	3	32	19
261	(Sri Lanka) Pathum Nissanka	6	43.50	160.12	107	1	2	23	11
217	(Pakistan) Sahibzada Farhan	7	31.00	116.04	58	–	2	14	11
213	(India) Tilak Varma	6	71.00	131.48	69*	–	1	12	10
181	(Pakistan) Fakhar Zaman	7	30.16	120.66	50	–	1	16	5
Source: ESPNcricinfo

=== Most wickets ===
Wickets	Player	Inns.	BBI	Avg	Eco.	4W	5W
17	(India) Kuldeep Yadav	7	4/7	9.29	6.27	2	–
10	(Pakistan) Shaheen Afridi	7	3/17	16.40	6.60	–	–
9	(United Arab Emirates) Junaid Siddique	3	4/18	6.33	6.33	2	–
9	(Bangladesh) Mustafizur Rahman	6	3/20	19.00	7.43	–	–
9	(Pakistan) Haris Rauf	5	3/33	18.33	9.00	–	–
Source: ESPNcricinfo

== Controversies ==
The tournament witnessed a series of controversies involving arch rivals India and Pakistan, who participated in the backdrop of the 2025 India–Pakistan conflict.

Ahead of a group stage match, the tournament organizers mistakenly played a few seconds of "Jalebi Baby" instead of Pakistan's national anthem, prompting criticism from the Pakistani audience.

=== Handshake-gate ===
The tournament was noted for a controversy dubbed “handshake-gate,” which arose during the coin toss of the group-stage match between India and Pakistan, when both captains refrained from shaking hands, reportedly on the advice of match referee Andy Pycroft. Following the conclusion of the match, the Indian players left the field without exchanging handshakes with the Pakistani team. A similar situation occurred during the Super Four match and the final match. After the incident during group stage match with India, Pakistan's head coach Mike Hesson expressed disappointment, while the PCB lodged a formal protest against Pycroft and later suspended its operations director Usman Wahla over the handling of the episode. PCB's demand for the removal of Pycroft from the remainder of the tournament was rejected by the International Cricket Council (ICC). The subsequent group stage match between Pakistan and the United Arab Emirates was delayed by an hour amid uncertainty over Pakistan's further participation in the tournament, but eventually went ahead after the PCB claimed that Pycroft had apologised for the "miscommunication", while the ICC confirmed he would continue as match referee.

=== Breach of ICC Code of Conduct and Disciplinary hearings ===
The BCCI lodged a complaint with the ICC against Pakistani players Haris Rauf and Sahibzada Farhan for their "provocative" gestures during the Super Four match between India and Pakistan. While fielding near the boundary, Rauf made a "jet crashing" gesture and a "6-0" finger sign, interpreted as a symbolic reference to Pakistan's claim of shooting down six Indian aircraft during Operation Sindoor. A video published by NDTV showed that Rauf repeated the same gesture after taking a wicket, indicating his actions were not limited to a single incident. Earlier in the same match, Farhan celebrated his half-century by mimicking firing a rifle with his bat, which was described as provocative and insensitive by the Indian media. The PCB also registered a complaint against India captain Suryakumar Yadav, who expressed solidarity with the victims of the Pahalgam terror attack and dedicated his team's win to the Indian Army, which the PCB alleged were "political statements".

Following disciplinary hearings conducted by members of the ICC Elite Panel of Match Referees, Suryakumar Yadav was found guilty of breaching Article 2.21 (conduct that brings the game into disrepute) and was fined 30 per cent of his match fee and given two demerit points. Sahibzada Farhan was found guilty of the same offence and was issued an official warning with one demerit point. Haris Rauf was found guilty of the same offence and was fined 30 per cent of his match fee and given two demerit points. Rauf was later found guilty of a further breach in the final on 28 September and received two additional demerit points. Because he accumulated four demerit points within a 24-month period this converted to two suspension points under the ICC framework, resulting in a two-match ban that ruled him out of Pakistan's ODIs against South Africa on 4 and 6 November 2025.

In other incidents during the tournament Jasprit Bumrah received an official warning and one demerit point under Article 2.21, while Arshdeep Singh was cleared of an alleged breach of Article 2.6 (use of obscene or offensive gestures), and therefore no sanction was imposed on him.

=== Presentation ceremony controversy ===
After India defeated Pakistan in the final, the presentation ceremony was delayed by more than an hour as the Pakistani team arrived late, and India refused to accept the winners' trophy and medals from Asian Cricket Council (ACC) president Mohsin Naqvi, who is also Pakistan's Interior Minister and Chairman of the PCB. When Pakistani captain Salman Ali Agha was presented with the runners-up cheque of US$75,000 by Aminul Islam of the ACC, he flung it to the ground almost instantly, attracting both loud cheers and boos from the crowd still present in the stands.

Despite the Indian team's objection, Naqvi insisted on presenting the trophy and medals to them himself, resulting in an impasse. India were not awarded the trophy and medals during the ceremony, and Naqvi reportedly left the stadium with the trophy. Following this, Indian captain Suryakumar Yadav celebrated the Indian victory by hoisting an 'imaginary trophy' with his team. Later he criticised the handling of the ceremony and said his team had been "denied" the opportunity to lift the trophy.

BCCI secretary Devajit Saikia described Naqvi's act of "taking away" the trophy and medals as "unsporting", and announced that the BCCI would protest his actions at the ICC conference in November. On 1 October, three days after the final, Naqvi reiterated his refusal to give the trophy to India unless the team personally collected it from him at the ACC head office in Dubai.

== Broadcasting ==
Territory	Rights holder(s)
Afghanistan	Lemar TV; SonyLIV
Bangladesh	T Sports; Nagorik TV; Toffee; Tapmad
India	Sony Sports; SonyLIV
Nepal	Sony Sports; SonyLIV
Pakistan	PTV Sports
Sri Lanka	TV 1
Australia	Fox Sports
United Arab Emirates	Switch TV; StarzPlay; CricLife
MENA region	Switch TV; StarzPlay; CricLife
United Kingdom	TNT Sports
United States	Willow TV
Canada	Willow TV
Caribbean	SonyLIV
Sub-Saharan Africa	SonyLIV
