= West Indian cricket team in Pakistan in 1991–92 =

International cricket tour

The West Indies cricket team visited Pakistan in November 1991 and played a three-match Limited Overs International (LOI) series against the Pakistan national cricket team. West Indies won the series 2–0 with the second match tied. West Indies were captained by Richie Richardson and Pakistan by Imran Khan.

== One Day Internationals (ODIs) ==
West Indies won the series 2-0, with one match tied.

=== 1st ODI ===
20 November 1991
Scorecard

West Indies; 170/6 (34 overs)	v	Pakistan; 146 (33.5 overs)
BC Lara 54 (59); Wasim Akram 3/27 (6 overs)		Javed Miandad 31 (37); CL Hooper 4/34 (7.5 overs)

West Indies won by 24 runs
National Stadium, Karachi
Umpires: Khizer Hayat and Riazuddin
Player of the match: BC Lara (WI)

- West Indies won the toss and elected to bat.
- The match was reduced from 40 to 34 overs per side.
- AC Cummins and PA Wallace (both WI) made their ODI debuts.

=== 2nd ODI ===
22 November 1991
Scorecard

West Indies; 186/5 (39 overs)	v	Pakistan; 186/9 (39 overs)
DL Haynes 69 (110); Wasim Akram 2/36 (7 overs)		Imran Khan 51 (67); MD Marshall 3/39 (8 overs)

Match tied
Gaddafi Stadium, Lahore
Umpires: Khizer Hayat and Riazuddin
Player of the match: DL Haynes (WI)

- Pakistan won the toss and elected to field.
- The match was reduced from 40 to 39 overs per side.
- Inzamam-ul-Haq (PAK) made his ODI debut.

=== 3rd ODI ===
24 November 1991
Scorecard

West Indies; 204/5 (40 overs)	v	Pakistan; 187/8 (40 overs)
CL Hooper 57 (64); Aaqib Javed 4/31 (8 overs)		Inzamam-ul-Haq 60 (91); AC Cummins 2/27 (8 overs)

West Indies won by 17 runs
Iqbal Stadium, Faisalabad
Umpires: Athar Zaidi and Khizer Hayat
Player of the match: CL Hooper (WI)

- Pakistan won the toss and elected to field.
