= Sahibzada Farhan =

Pakistani cricketer (born 1996)

Personal information
- Born: 6 March 1996 (age 30); Charsadda, Khyber Pakhtunkhwa, Pakistan
- Nickname: Patakha
- Height: 1.75 m (5 ft 9 in)
- Batting: Right-handed
- Role: Top-order batter

International information
- National side: Pakistan (2018–present)
- ODI debut (cap 257): 11 March 2026 v Bangladesh
- Last ODI: 2 June 2026 v Australia
- T20I debut (cap 79): 8 July 2018 v Australia
- Last T20I: 28 February 2026 v Sri Lanka
- T20I shirt no.: 51

Domestic team information
- Years: Team
- 2016, 2023–present: Peshawar
- 2017: Baluchistan
- 2017: Faisalabad
- 2018–2019, 2025–present: Islamabad United
- 2019–2022: Khyber Pakhtunkhwa
- 2022: Karachi Kings
- 2023: Lahore Qalandars
- 2026: Multan Sultans
- 2026: Dambulla Sixers

Career statistics
Competition	ODI	T20I	FC	LA
Matches	5	46	63	77
Runs scored	95	1,305	4,796	3,021
Batting average	19.00	30.34	44.82	40.28
100s/50s	0/0	2/10	10/29	8/20
Top score	31	100*	245	155
Balls bowled	-	–	210	–
Wickets	-	–	3	–
Bowling average	–	–	39.66	–
5 wickets in innings	–	–	0	–
10 wickets in match	–	–	0	–
Best bowling	–	–	2/23	–
Catches/stumpings	1/–	19/–	65/–	39/–
Medal record
Men's cricket
Representing Pakistan
Asia Cup
Runner-up	2025 UAE	Team
Asian Games
Silver medal – second place	2026 Aichi–Nagoya	Team
- Source: ESPNcricinfo, 3 June 2026

Sahibzada Farhan (Urdu, Pashto: صاحبزاده فرحان; pronounced [sɑhibzɑda fəɽhɑn]; born 6 March 1996) is a Pakistani international cricketer and captain of the national team in the T20I format. He plays as a right-handed top order batsman. Farhan represents Peshawar in domestic cricket and Multan Sultans in the Pakistan Super League.

== Early life ==
Farhan began playing cricket at a young age in his hometown of Charsadda, primarily with tape or tennis balls due to the lack of hard-ball cricket facilities. His formal journey in cricket began after his family Sahibzada Farman, a police officer, moved to Peshawar in 2008, where he joined the Peshawar Gymkhana Club. Although his family relocated for his education, Farhan's passion remained with cricket, and he often trained without full support from his extended family. However, his father recognized his potential and supported his ambitions.

Initially, Farhan trained as a fast bowler but found limited success, participating in only a few matches over two years. He later switched focus to batting after performing impressively in a local match. Encouraged by a friend, he resumed hard-ball cricket as a batsman, quickly gaining attention in local tournaments by scoring successive centuries in a PCB inter-district tournament.

These performances earned him a spot in the Peshawar Under-19 team, despite skepticism from some quarters. Supported by coach Fazl-e-Akbar, Farhan excelled at the Under-19 level. Despite his strong performances, Farhan's first-class debut was delayed until 2016 due to an appendicitis surgery.

== Domestic career ==
He made his first-class debut for Peshawar in the 2016–17 Quaid-e-Azam Trophy on 1 October 2016.

He was the leading run-scorer for Balochistan in the 2017 Pakistan Cup, scoring 331 runs in five matches.

In April 2018, he was named in Punjab's squad for the 2018 Pakistan Cup. In the opening match against Balochistan, he scored 155 runs and was named man of the match. In March 2019, he was named in Sindh's squad for the 2019 Pakistan Cup.

In September 2019, he joined the Khyber Pakhtunkhwa squad for the 2019–20 Quaid-e-Azam Trophy. He was the leading run-scorer in the 2021–22 National T20 Cup, with 447 runs, and was named the PCB's Domestic Cricketer of the Year for 2021. In December 2023, he was appointed captain of Sui Northern Gas Pipelines Limited for the 2023–24 President's Trophy.

In the 2024–25 National T20 Cup, Farhan set a new record for the most runs in a single edition of the tournament, scoring 588 runs in six innings. During the semi-final for Peshawar, he scored 148 runs against Abbottabad Region. His highest score of 162, made against Quetta Region, surpassed Kamran Akmal's 150 as the highest T20 score by a Pakistani batsman. He ended the tournament with 605 runs and was adjudged Player of the Series.

During the 2025 Pakistan Super League, he played for Islamabad United, scoring 184 runs in six matches with a strike rate of 165.77. He was later signed by Multan Sultans for the 2026 Pakistan Super League, where he scored his ninth Twenty20 century.

== International career ==
In June 2018, he was named in Pakistan's Twenty20 International (T20I) squad for the 2018 Zimbabwe Tri-Nation Series. He made his T20I debut against Australia in the final of the tournament.

In December 2018, he represented Pakistan in the 2018 ACC Emerging Teams Asia Cup.

In May 2025, Farhan returned to the national side and scored a career-best 74 runs in the second T20I against Bangladesh, reaching his maiden T20I half-century in 29 balls.

During the Pakistan's 3–0 series sweep against the West Indies in August 2025, he scored 63 runs off 41 balls in the third T20I.

During the 2025 Asia Cup, Farhan scored 58 runs off 45 balls in a match against India. During the tournament, he surpassed Abhishek Sharma’s record for the most T20 sixes in a calendar year by an Asian batter, reaching 88 sixes in 34 innings. In the 2025 Asia Cup final, he was the top-scorer for Pakistan with 57 runs.

In November 2025, during a Tri-Nation Series match against Sri Lanka, he scored an unbeaten 80* off 45 balls. He became the first Pakistani batter to hit 100 T20 sixes in a single calendar year during this series. In the fourth match of the series against Zimbabwe, he scored 63 runs from 41 balls in a 103-run partnership with Babar Azam.

Farhan was included in the Pakistan squad for the 2026 Men's T20 World Cup. He finished as the tournament's leading run-scorer with 383 runs, surpassing Virat Kohli's record for the most runs in a single T20 World Cup edition. He became the first player to score two centuries in a single T20 World Cup and shared a 176-run partnership with Fakhar Zaman against Sri Lanka, the highest partnership in the history of the tournament.

== Controversy ==
Following the match against India at the 2025 Asia Cup on 14 September, Farhan was criticized by the Indian media for a celebration they described as "AK-47-style" after he reached his half-century. Farhan defended it, saying that the gesture was spontaneous and not pre-planned, and that he did not mind how it was interpreted.

Following disciplinary hearings conducted by members of the ICC Elite Panel of Match Referees, Farhan was found guilty of breaching Article 2.21 (conduct that brings the game into disrepute) and was issued an official warning along with one demerit point.
