= Saim Ayub =

Pakistani cricketer (born 2002)

Personal information
- Born: 24 May 2002 (age 24); Karachi, Sindh, Pakistan
- Nickname: Super Saim
- Height: 1.73 m (5 ft 8 in)
- Batting: Left-handed
- Bowling: Right-arm off break
- Role: All-rounder

International information
- National side: Pakistan (2023–present)
- Test debut (cap 256): 3 January 2024 v Australia
- Last Test: 9 September 2026 v England
- ODI debut (cap 243): 4 November 2024 v Australia
- Last ODI: 14 November 2025 v Sri Lanka
- ODI shirt no.: 63
- T20I debut (cap 101): 24 March 2023 v Afghanistan
- Last T20I: 24 February 2026 v England
- T20I shirt no.: 63

Domestic team information
- Years: Team
- 2021: Quetta Gladiators
- 2022–2023: Sindh
- 2022/23: Rangpur Riders
- 2023–2025: Peshawar Zalmi
- 2023: Guyana Amazon Warriors
- 2023–present: Karachi Whites

Career statistics
Competition	Test	ODI	T20I	FC
Matches	9	17	67	26
Runs scored	364	751	1,298	1,608
Batting average	22.75	46.93	21.27	36.54
100s/50s	0/3	3/3	0/6	3/8
Top score	77	113*	98*	203
Balls bowled	214	445	540	502
Wickets	4	9	29	6
Bowling average	49.00	41.55	22.27	59.83
5 wickets in innings	0	0	0	0
10 wickets in match	0	0	0	0
Best bowling	2/101	2/29	3/25	2/101
Catches/stumpings	4/–	13/–	27/–	15/–
Medal record
Men's cricket
Representing Pakistan
Asia Cup
Runner-up	2025 UAE	Team
Asian Games
Silver medal – second place	2026 Aichi–Nagoya	Team
- Source: ESPNcricinfo, 12 September 2026

Saim Ayub (Urdu: صائم ایوب; born 24 May 2002) is a Pakistani international cricketer. He plays for the Pakistan national team as an all-rounder, who bats left-handed and bowls right-arm off break. He represents Karachi Whites in domestic cricket and Peshawar Zalmi in the Pakistan Super League.

== Early life ==
His father Ayub Ahmed and uncle Mohammad Javed both played cricket at the club level. Saim was initiated into the game at a young age with tape ball cricket from Gulistan-e-Johar, helped by his father as well as by two elder brothers.

== Domestic and franchise career ==
In February 2021, Saim made his Twenty20 debut for the Quetta Gladiators in the 2021 Pakistan Super League.

In March 2022, he made his List A debut for Sindh in the 2021–22 Pakistan Cup.

In September 2022, he made his first-class debut for Sindh in the 2022–23 Quaid-e-Azam Trophy.

=== Pakistan Super League ===
In 2021, Ayub played for the Quetta Gladiators but failed to secure a regular place in the playing XI and was not retained for the following season. In the 2023 PSL, playing for Peshawar Zalmi, he scored his maiden PSL half-century in 33 deliveries, drawing comparisons from some observers to Saeed Anwar. In match 25 of PSL 2023 (Peshawar vs Quetta), he scored 74 off 34 balls, helping Zalmi post 240/2 in 20 overs. He also produced a knock of 58 off 33 in match 27. He finished the season with 341 runs at an average of 28.41 and a strike rate of 165.53 over 12 matches.

Ahead of the 2026 Pakistan Super League, Ayub was released by Peshawar Zalmi and was pre-signed by Hyderabad Kingsmen for 12.6 crore Pakistani rupees, making him the most expensive local player in the tournament.

=== Other leagues ===
- Rangpur Riders (Bangladesh Premier League): Signed by Rangpur Riders for the 2022–23 BPL season.
- Guyana Amazon Warriors (Caribbean Premier League): Played for Guyana Amazon Warriors in the 2023 CPL.
- Durdanto Dhaka (Bangladesh Premier League): Played for Durdanto Dhaka in the 2023–24 BPL.

== International career ==
In December 2022, Ayub, along with fast bowler Ihsanullah and wicket-keeper batsman Haseebullah Khan, was included in Pakistan's Test squad for the second match of the series against New Zealand in Karachi. The trio were added to gain international exposure and experience the team environment.

In March 2023, he was named in Pakistan's Twenty20 International (T20I) squad for the series against Afghanistan, making his debut in the first match on 24 March 2023. He was named in Pakistan's Test squad for the 2023–24 tour of Australia and made his debut in the third Test at Sydney on 3 January 2024.

In May 2024, Ayub was named in Pakistan's squad for the 2024 ICC Men's T20 World Cup. Later that year, he was selected for the Test series against Bangladesh and for the three-match series against England, where he recorded his highest Test score of 77 at Multan in October 2024.

He was subsequently named for Pakistan's tours of Zimbabwe and Australia. Ayub made his ODI debut against Australia in Melbourne on 4 November 2024, scoring one run before being dismissed by Mitchell Starc. He rebounded strongly in the second match, scoring 82 off 71 balls to help Pakistan to a commanding win, and was among the leading run-scorers as Pakistan claimed the series 2–1.

In Zimbabwe later that month, he struck his maiden ODI century, a 53-ball hundred, the second-fastest by a Pakistani, helping Pakistan to a 10-wicket win in the second match of the series. He finished the series as the leading run-scorer and was named Player of the Series after contributing 155 runs and three wickets across three matches.

In December 2024, Ayub was named in Pakistan's squad for the tour of South Africa. He scored an unbeaten 98 in the second T20I, narrowly missing a maiden T20I century, and followed with back-to-back ODI centuries, including a match-winning 101 in the third ODI that sealed Pakistan's first-ever ODI whitewash in South Africa. His performances made him the youngest player to score an ODI century against South Africa while chasing, surpassing a record previously held by Brian Lara. His tour ended prematurely due to an ankle injury sustained during the second Test in Cape Town.

In August 2025, during the T20I series in the West Indies, Ayub was a key contributor in Pakistan's 2–1 series win, earning the Player of the Match award in the first game for a half-century and two wickets. He finished as the leading run-scorer with 130 runs across the series.

In the 2025 Asia Cup, Ayub endured a poor run with the bat, including three consecutive ducks, but impressed with his off-spin bowling, taking six wickets at an economy rate of 5.6, including three against India. His performances prompted analysts to suggest he could evolve into an all-rounder. Following the tournament, he became the ICC's No. 1-ranked all-rounder in men's T20Is.

In October 2025, in the second home T20I against South Africa, Saim hit 72 (not out) off 38 deliveries, making his first T20I fifty at home. He was noted for his aggressive 360-degree innings, punishing width and short deliveries while mixing power with improvisation. During the ODI home series against South Africa, Ayub hit two consecutive ODI half-centuries, 53 (66) in the second ODI and 77 (70) in the third and last ODI of the series, which Pakistan won, Ayub's knock being instrumental in the chase.

In January 2026, In the 1st T20I of Australia's tour of Pakistan, Pakistan recorded a comfortable victory, led by an all-round performance from Ayub, who scored 40 in 22 deliveries later took 2 wickets for 29 runs. He was declared Player of the Match.

=== Injury ===
In January 2025, during the second Test against South Africa in Cape Town, Saim Ayub fractured his right ankle while fielding, ruling him out of the remaining matches on that tour. The Pakistan Cricket Board later confirmed that he would also miss the 2025 ICC Champions Trophy, prescribing a rehabilitation period of approximately ten weeks.

Ayub returned to international action during Pakistan's T20I series in the West Indies in August 2025, where he featured in the first match and played a key role in the team's victory.

== Playing style ==
Ayub is famous for playing a distinctive "no-look shot", in which he looks away from the ball while executing a stroke towards the leg side. He first played the shot during a domestic T20 match in 2022, which he later described as an unplanned improvisation based on the field placement. The shot became popular after he used it in the Pakistan Super League and the Quaid-e-Azam Trophy, notably hitting no-look sixes in both tournaments. According to Dawn, the shot has since become associated with his batting style.
