= Mohammad Haris =

Pakistani cricketer

Muhammad Haris
Personal information
- Born: 30 March 2001 (age 25); Peshawar, Khyber Pakhtunkhwa, Pakistan
- Nickname: Mr Google
- Height: 5 ft 4 in (163 cm)
- Batting: Right-handed
- Bowling: Right-arm off break
- Role: Wicket-keeper-batter

International information
- National side: Pakistan (2022-present)
- ODI debut (cap 234): 8 June 2022 v West Indies
- Last ODI: 14 September 2023 v Sri Lanka
- ODI shirt no.: 29
- T20I debut (cap 99): 30 September 2022 v England
- Last T20I: 26 March 2025 v New Zealand
- T20I shirt no.: 29

Domestic team information
- Years: Team
- 2020–2023: Khyber Pakhtunkhwa (squad no. 100)
- 2021: Karachi Kings
- 2022–2025: Peshawar Zalmi (squad no. 29)
- 2023–2024: Sylhet Strikers
- 2024-present: Durbar Rajshahi
- 2023–present: Peshawar (squad no. 29)

Career statistics
Competition	ODI	T20I	FC	LA
Matches	6	17	13	50
Runs scored	30	402	478	1166
Batting average	7.5	19.86	25.15	29.89
100s/50s	–	1/–	–/3	1/8
Top score	17 *	107 *	62	100
Catches/stumpings	5/2	9/1	50/6	51/8
Medal record
Men's Cricket
Representing Pakistan
Asia Cup
Runner-up	2025 UAE
T20 World Cup
Runner-up	2022 Australia
- Source: ESPNcricinfo, 5 April 2025

Mohammad Haris (Urdu, Pashto: محمد حارث) is a Pakistani international cricketer. He plays for Peshawar Zalmi in the Pakistan Super League (PSL). He replaced Babar Azam as captain of Peshawar Zalmi on 29 December 2025 for the 2026 PSL.

Known for his aggressive batting style, and nicknamed "Mr. Google" for his curiosity and knowledge during his Under-19 days, he has been compared to former Pakistan international Mohammad Yousuf for the similarity in their batting techniques.

== Early career ==
Haris was born into a Pashtun family in Mushtarzai, a village close to Peshawar.

He learned cricket at Peshawar's Maazullah Khan Cricket Academy before being selected for the Peshawar Under-19 team and, a year later, for the Under-19 national team.

In December 2019, he was named in Pakistan's squad for the 2020 Under-19 Cricket World Cup.

== Domestic career ==
In October 2020, he made his Twenty20 debut for Khyber Pakhtunkhwa in the 2020–21 National T20 Cup.

In October 2021, he was named in the Pakistan Shaheens squad for their tour of Sri Lanka. He made his first-class debut during that tour.

In June 2021, he was named as a replacement player in the Karachi Kings' squad following the mini draft for the 2021 PSL, but did not play in any of the team's matches.

In December 2021, he was signed by Peshawar Zalmi following the players' draft in the supplementary category for the 2022 PSL.

In February 2022, he made his PSL debut against Karachi Kings at Gaddafi Stadium in Lahore, scoring 49 runs off 27 balls, and winning the man of the match award.

He captained the Pakistan Shaheens for both the 2023 ACC Emerging Teams Asia Cup, which Pakistan won, as well the 2024 ACC Emerging Teams Asia Cup.

== International career ==
In September 2021, he was named in Pakistan's ODI squad for their series against New Zealand.

In February 2022, following his performances in the PSL, he was added to Pakistan's reserve list for their Test series against Australia.

In March 2022, Haris was named in Pakistan's ODI and T20I squads for their series against Australia.

In May 2022, he was named in Pakistan's ODI squad for the series against the West Indies.

In June 2022, he made his ODI debut against the West Indies. It would also mark his international debut for Pakistan.

In September 2022, he was named in the Pakistan's T20I squad for the series against England. He made his T20I debut during that series.

He was selected for the 2023 Cricket World Cup in India as a traveling reserve.

In June 2025, in the last T20I match of the Bangladeshi tour of Pakistan, he hit his maiden century, also becoming the first non-opener from Pakistan to score a T20 century. He was also judged Player of the Series.
