= Haris Rauf =

Pakistani cricketer (born 1993)

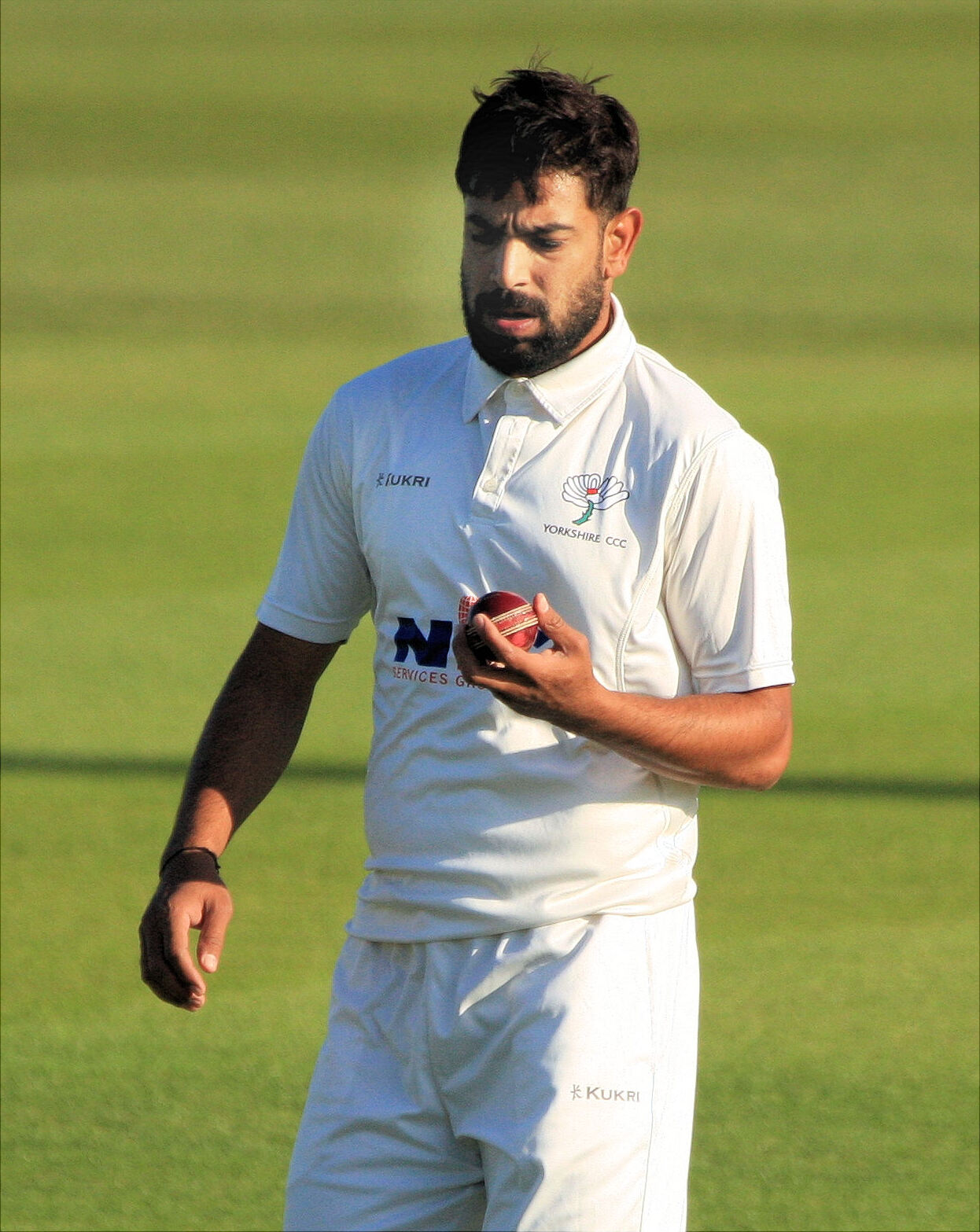
- Rauf in 2022

Personal information
- Born: 7 November 1993 (age 33); Rawalpindi, Punjab, Pakistan
- Nickname: Mr 150
- Height: 5 ft 11 in (180 cm)
- Batting: Right-handed
- Bowling: Right-arm fast
- Role: Bowler

International information
- National side: Pakistan (2020–present)
- Only Test (cap 248): 1 December 2022 v England
- ODI debut (cap 225): 30 October 2020 v Zimbabwe
- Last ODI: 15 March 2026 v Bangladesh
- ODI shirt no.: 97
- T20I debut (cap 86): 24 January 2020 v Bangladesh
- Last T20I: 28 September 2025 v India
- T20I shirt no.: 97

Domestic team information
- Years: Team
- 2019–present: Lahore Qalandars
- 2019–2023: Northern
- 2019/20–present: Melbourne Stars
- 2022: Yorkshire
- 2022/23: Rangpur Riders
- 2023–2025: San Francisco Unicorns
- 2023–2024: Welsh Fire

Career statistics
Competition	Test	ODI	T20I	FC
Matches	1	59	94	13
Runs scored	12	108	143	143
Batting average	6.00	7.20	8.41	11.00
100s/50s	0/0	0/0	0/0	0/0
Top score	12	35	34*	34
Balls bowled	78	2,850	2,009	1,943
Wickets	1	107	133	42
Bowling average	78.00	25.70	21.10	29.16
5 wickets in innings	0	2	0	2
10 wickets in match	0	0	0	0
Best bowling	1/78	5/18	4/18	6/47
Catches/stumpings	0/–	12/–	29/–	5/–
Medal record
Men's cricket
Representing Pakistan
ICC T20 World Cup
Runner-up	2022 Australia
Asia Cup
Runner-up	2022 UAE
Runner-up	2025 UAE
- Source: Cricinfo, 1 September 2026

Haris Rauf (Note: Urdu: حارث رؤف, ISO: Hāris Ra'ūf) (pronounced [ɦaːɾɪs ɾəuːf]; born 7 November 1993) is a Pakistani international cricketer who plays as a right-arm fast bowler for the Pakistani national team. He also plays for Lahore Qalandars in the Pakistan Super League and Northern in first class cricket.

He made his international debut for the Pakistan cricket team in January 2020 against Bangladesh. He made his Twenty20 debut for the Lahore Qalandars in the 2018 Abu Dhabi T20 Trophy on 5 October 2018. In November 2018, he was selected by the Lahore Qalandars in the players' draft for the 2019 Pakistan Super League tournament. He made his Test debut against England in December 2022.

== Early life and family ==
Rauf was born on 7 November 1993 in Rawalpindi, into a working class family. His father was a welder who was employed by the Pakistan Public Works Department. Although he grew up near the Diamond Cricket Club in Islamabad, he never formally joined the club.

Haris attended the Islamabad Model College for Boys I-8/3. At college, he was more inclined towards football than cricket, helping his school win the football trophy and being recognized as the player of the tournament. For further education, he enrolled in the International Islamic University, Islamabad, for an IT program. Before dedicating himself entirely to cricket, he worked in a mobile shop and supplemented his income by playing tape-ball cricket, affiliating with teams that offered compensation.

On 23 December 2022, Rauf married his classmate Muzna Masood Malik in a traditional nikkah ceremony in Islamabad.

== Early career ==
Rauf started playing with hard ball at the age of 23. He joined the cricket team of International Islamic University, Islamabad, and when its coach asked him to attend the Lahore Qalandars trials to be held in Gujranwala in September 2017, he was initially reluctant. However, he agreed and was spotted by the Qalandars' head coach Aaqib Javed. Soon, he was given a contract by Lahore Qalandars as they acknowledged his potential and aimed to nurture his skills. Standing at 5'11" and weighing 71 kg, he began a dedicated fitness journey with Aaqib, who provided him with a structured training and diet plan. To aid his growth, Rauf played for the Hawkesbury Cricket Club in Australia. He made his T20 debut with the Qalandars against the Hobart Hurricanes in 2018.

== Domestic career ==
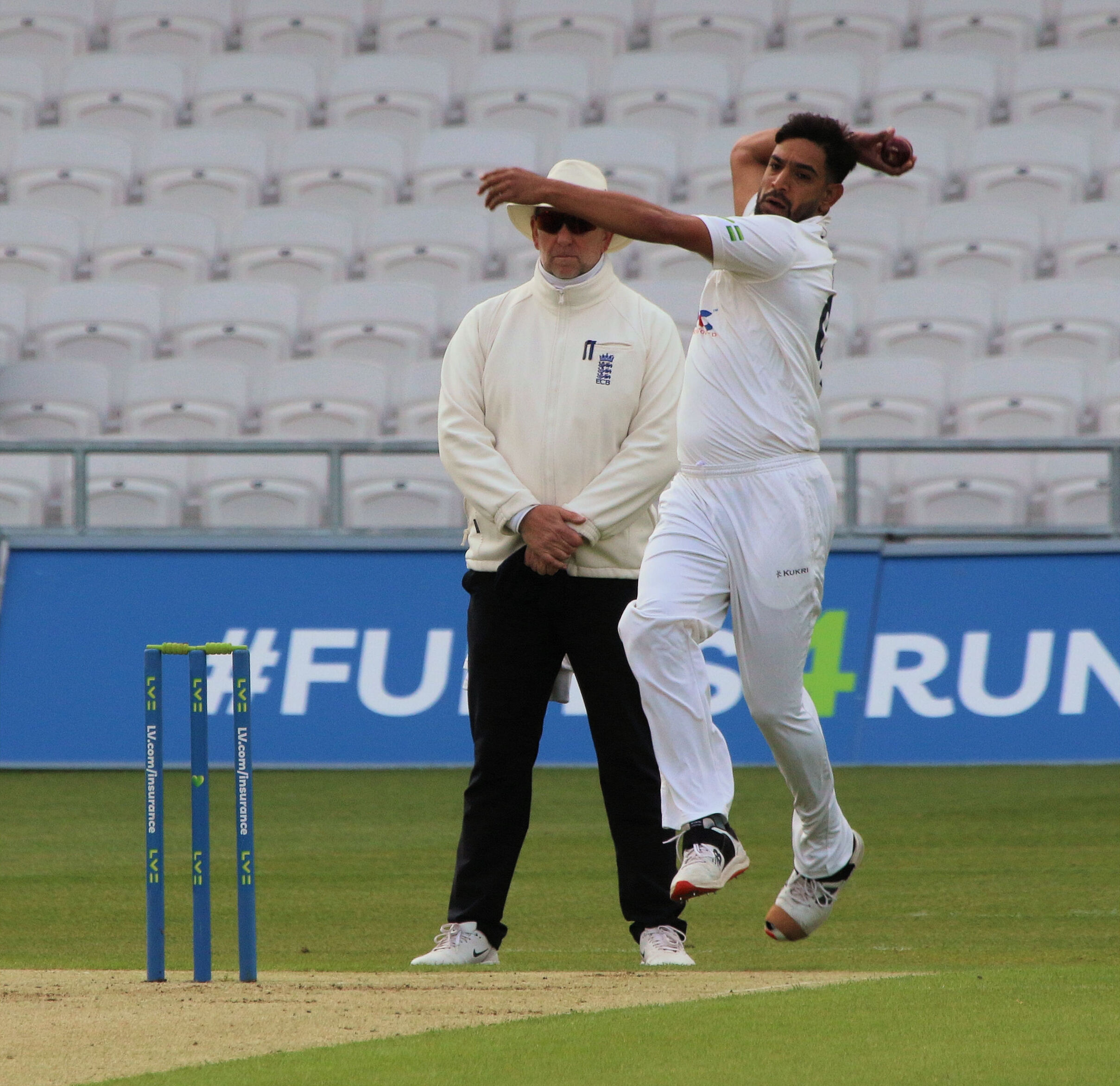
Rauf bowling for Yorkshire in 2022.

In 2018, Rauf was selected for Lahore Qalandars for the 2018 Abu Dhabi T20 Trophy, which also marked his domestic career debut.

In March 2019, Rauf was named in Baluchistan's squad for the 2019 Pakistan Cup. He made his List A debut for Baluchistan in the 2019 Pakistan Cup on 2 April 2019. In September 2019, he was named in Northern's squad for the 2019–20 Quaid-e-Azam Trophy tournament. He made his first-class debut for Northern in the 2019–20 Quaid-e-Azam Trophy on 28 September 2019. In October 2019, the Pakistan Cricket Board (PCB) named him as one of the six players to watch ahead of the 2019–20 National T20 Cup tournament.

In December 2019, after originally only being in Australia to play for the Glenorchy Magpies in Tasmanian Grade Cricket, he joined the Melbourne Stars for 2019-20 Big Bash League season as a replacement for Dale Steyn who was injured. He took a five-wicket haul in his second match against the Hobart Hurricanes. On 8 January 2020, he took a hat-trick against the Sydney Thunder, becoming the first Pakistani and first Melbourne Stars bowler to do so in the BBL, with one delivery bowled at 151.3 km/h. On 16 February 2019, he took 4 for 23 and help Lahore Qalandars to win against Karachi Kings.

In December 2021, Rauf was signed by Yorkshire County Cricket Club to play in the 2022 cricket season in England.

== International career ==
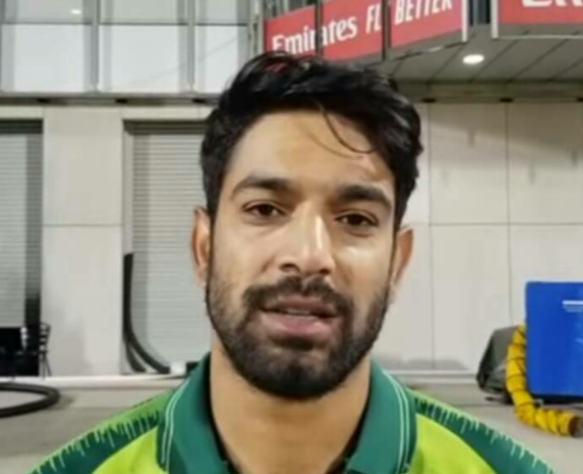
Rauf in 2020.

In January 2020, Rauf was named in Pakistan's Twenty20 International (T20I) squad for their series against Bangladesh. He made his T20I debut for Pakistan, against Bangladesh, on 24 January 2020.

In May 2020, the Pakistan Cricket Board (PCB) awarded him with a central contract, in a newly created Emerging Players' category, ahead of the 2020–21 season. In June 2020, he was named in a 29-man squad for Pakistan's tour to England during the COVID-19 pandemic. However, on 22 June 2020, Rauf was one of three players from Pakistan's squad to test positive for COVID-19. Although he had shown no previous symptoms of the virus, he was advised to go into a period of self-isolation. Rauf was eventually replaced in Pakistan's squad by Mohammad Amir, after he had provided five positive tests out of six for COVID-19 in the last month. On 30 July 2020, the PCB confirmed that Rauf had returned two consecutive negative tests, and was therefore eligible to fly to England to join the Pakistan squad.

On 29 October 2020, Rauf was named in Pakistan's One Day International (ODI) squad for the first match against Zimbabwe. He made his ODI debut for Pakistan, against Zimbabwe, on 30 October 2020. In November 2020, he was named in Pakistan's 35-man squad for their tour to New Zealand. In January 2021, he was named in Pakistan's Test squad for their series against South Africa. In March 2021, he was again named in Pakistan's Test squad, this time for their series against Zimbabwe. In June 2021, he was also named in Pakistan's Test squad for the series against the West Indies.

In September 2021, Rauf was named in Pakistan's squad for the 2021 ICC Men's T20 World Cup. He took a four-for against New Zealand to the win man-of-the-match for Pakistan in their second game of the tournament.

In February 2022, Rauf was named in Pakistan's Test squad for their series against Australia. In August 2022, Rauf was named in Pakistan's squad for Asia cup.

In October 2022, Rauf was named in Pakistan's squad for the 2022 ICC Men's T20 World Cup.

On 22 August 2023, Rauf took his first international five-wicket haul, taking 5/18 against Afghanistan.

In May 2024, he was named in Pakistan's squad for the 2024 ICC Men's T20 World Cup tournament.

In November 2024, Rauf played a pivotal role in Pakistani cricket team in Australia in 2024–25. Pakistan lost the first ODI at the Melbourne Cricket Ground by two wickets, with Rauf taking 3/67. In the second ODI at the Adelaide Oval, Rauf delivered a match-winning performance by taking his second international five-wicket haul in ODIs (5/29), helping Pakistan secure a nine-wicket victory. Pakistan went on to win the third ODI at the Perth Stadium by eight wickets, with Rauf again playing a crucial role in the bowling attack. His consistent performances throughout the series, including a total of 10 wickets, earned him the Player of the Series award. With this 2–1 series win, Pakistan has now won an ODI series in Australia against Australia twice, the first being in Pakistani cricket team in Australia in 2002, making them the second team after South Africa with the most ODI series wins in Australia.

Rauf was named in Pakistan’s squad for the 2025 ICC Men’s Champions Trophy.

He played in the 2025 Asia Cup for Pakistan taking nine wickets across five games at an economy rate of 7.10. His best performance came in the Super Four match against Sri Lanka, where he claimed 3 for 22 to help Pakistan secure a place in the final at the Dubai International Stadium.

In November 2025, in the first match of the ODI home series against Sri Lanka, which Pakistan won by only 6 runs, Rauf produced a fiery spell of 4/61, including Sri Lanka's first three wickets in quick succession, breaking an 85-run opening stand which had given Sri Lanka early control of the chase. In the third and last ODI of the series, Rauf produced a disciplined bowling performance of 9 overs, 1 maiden, 38 runs, 2 wickets as Pakistan picked up the final wicket to clinch the match and complete the whitewash (3-0). His 2 for 38 helped curtail the tail and restrict Sri Lanka to 211, thereby laying the foundation for Pakistan’s comfortable chase and series victory. He was declared Player of the Series for his 9 wickets.

== See also ==
- Cricket in Pakistan
- Lahore Qalandars
