= Mohammad Nawaz (cricketer) =

Pakistani cricketer (born 1994)

Personal information
- Born: 21 March 1994 (age 32); Rawalpindi, Punjab, Pakistan
- Batting: Left-handed
- Bowling: Slow left-arm orthodox
- Role: All-rounder

International information
- National side: Pakistan (2016–present)
- Test debut (cap 223): 13 October 2016 v West Indies
- Last Test: 9 December 2022 v England
- ODI debut (cap 210): 18 August 2016 v Ireland
- Last ODI: 14 November 2025 v Sri Lanka
- ODI shirt no.: 21
- T20I debut (cap 68): 29 February 2016 v United Arab Emirates
- Last T20I: 28 February 2026 v Sri Lanka
- T20I shirt no.: 21

Domestic team information
- Years: Team
- 2011/12–2018/19: Rawalpindi
- 2012/13–2015/16: National Bank of Pakistan
- 2016–2023: Quetta Gladiators
- 2016–2018: Balochistan
- 2016/17: Karachi Blues
- 2017: Sindh
- 2017/18: United Bank Limited
- 2018–2019: Cape Town Blitz
- 2019: Sylhet Sixers
- 2018/19: Federal Areas
- 2019/20–2023: Northern
- 2019/20: Rajshahi Royals
- 2023: Rangpur Riders
- 2024: Karachi Kings
- 2025: Islamabad United
- 2026: Sialkot Stallionz

Career statistics
Competition	Test	ODI	T20I	FC
Matches	6	44	98	62
Runs scored	144	538	911	3,312
Batting average	16.00	21.52	17.51	34.50
100s/50s	0/0	0/2	0/0	6/16
Top score	45	59	45*	170
Balls bowled	959	2,097	1,760	6,407
Wickets	16	49	101	113
Bowling average	31.00	36.51	20.88	29.76
5 wickets in innings	1	0	2	4
10 wickets in match	0	0	0	1
Best bowling	5/88	4/19	5/18	7/31
Catches/stumpings	4/–	19/–	45/–	28/–
Medal record
Men's Cricket
Representing Pakistan
Asia Cup
Runner-up	2022 UAE
Runner-up	2025 UAE
T20 World Cup
Runner-up	2022 Australia
- Source: ESPNcricinfo, 8 March 2026

Mohammad Nawaz (Note: Urdu, Pashto: محمد نواز) (pronounced [mʊɦəmməd nəwaːz]; born 21 March 1994) is a Pakistani international cricketer. In August 2018, he was one of 33 players to be awarded a central contract for the 2018–19 season by the Pakistan Cricket Board (PCB).

== Early life and family ==
Nawaz was born in Rawalpindi, Punjab to a Pashtun family, belonging to Akbarpura, a village in Nowshera district of Khyber Pakhtunkhwa. He received his early education from the F.G. Boys School in Rawalpindi. He is fluent in English, Urdu, Pashto and Punjabi.

In 2018, he married Izdihaar, a South African diagnostic radiographer of Saudi Arabian descent.

== Domestic and T20 franchise career ==
Nawaz has played domestic cricket for several regional and departmental teams in Pakistan, including Rawalpindi, National Bank of Pakistan, Northern and Baluchistan. In April 2018 he was named vice-captain of Baluchistan's squad for the 2018 Pakistan Cup and finished the tournament as Baluchistan's leading wicket-taker (nine wickets in four matches).

In March 2019 he was named in the Federal Areas squad for the 2019 Pakistan Cup. In January 2021, Nawaz was appointed captain of Northern for the 2020–21 Pakistan Cup.

=== Pakistan Super League ===
Nawaz was signed by Quetta Gladiators for the inaugural 2016 Pakistan Super League. He made an immediate impact in the tournament opener against Islamabad United, taking 4 for 13 and earning the player-of-the-match award. He finished the 2016 PSL as one of the tournament's leading wicket-takers (13 wickets) and was retained by Quetta for the 2017 season, where he took 10 wickets in 10 matches as Quetta reached the final.

Ahead of the 2023 PSL Draft Nawaz was released by Quetta and later signed by Karachi Kings as a wild‐card pick.

=== Other franchise leagues ===
- Balkh Legends (Afghanistan Premier League): named in the Balkh squad for the inaugural 2018 Afghanistan Premier League.
- Edmonton Royals (Global T20 Canada): selected for the 2019 Global T20 Canada.
- Cape Town Blitz (Mzansi Super League): named in Cape Town Blitz's squad for the 2019 Mzansi Super League.
- Rajshahi Royals (Bangladesh Premier League): signed by Rajshahi Royals for the 2019–20 BPL and played a role in the team's run to the BPL final.

== International career ==
He made his Twenty20 International debut for Pakistan against the United Arab Emirates in the 2016 Asia Cup on 29 February 2016. He was hit for 38 runs from 3 overs after being called to bowl by captain Shahid Afridi. Waqar Younis, the head coach, criticised Afridi for this and said that it was 'unfair' for him to call Nawaz up being relatively new and that it 'destroyed the youngster's confidence'.

He made his One Day International debut for Pakistan against Ireland on 18 August 2016, scoring a half-century. In September 2016, he was named man of the match in the final of the 2016–17 National T20 Cup.

He made his Test debut for Pakistan against the West Indies in Dubai on 13 October 2016.

In June 2020, he was named as one of four reserve players for Pakistan's tour to England during the COVID-19 pandemic. In September 2021, he was named in Pakistan's squad for the 2021 ICC Men's T20 World Cup.

In July 2022, in the first match against Sri Lanka, he took his first five-wicket haul in Test cricket.

In September 2022, he was instrumental in a record win against India during the Asia Cup, being Pakistan's highest successful run-chase against India in a T20I, eventually named Player of the Match for his all-round contributions.

In September 2025, in the match against Afghanistan in UAE T20I Tri-series, he took his first five-wicket haul in T20I cricket, which also included a hat-trick, bowling out Afghanistan for 66, their second-lowest ever T20I total. Nawaz had previously contributed a 21-ball 25 with the bat in a low-scoring game. For his all-round performance he was adjudged Player of the Match as well Player of the Series.

In February 2026, in the third and final T20I of Australia's 2025-26 tour of Pakistan in Lahore, Pakistan completed a 3–0 series whitewash with a dominant 111-run victory over Australia, Australia's worst-ever T20I loss. Nawaz was named Player of the Match, delivering a career-best T20I bowling performance with figures of 5 for 18, spinning a major collapse in the Australian batting lineup and playing a pivotal role in Pakistan's triumph. That series was effectively a warm up for both teams for the T20 World Cup. After a match against the Netherlands on the 7th of February in that tournament, Nawaz tested positive for Carboxy-THC in a post-match doping test. It was announced in July that Nawaz had received a three-month suspension, which by then he had already voluntarily provisionally served.
