= Abrar Ahmed =

Pakistani cricketer

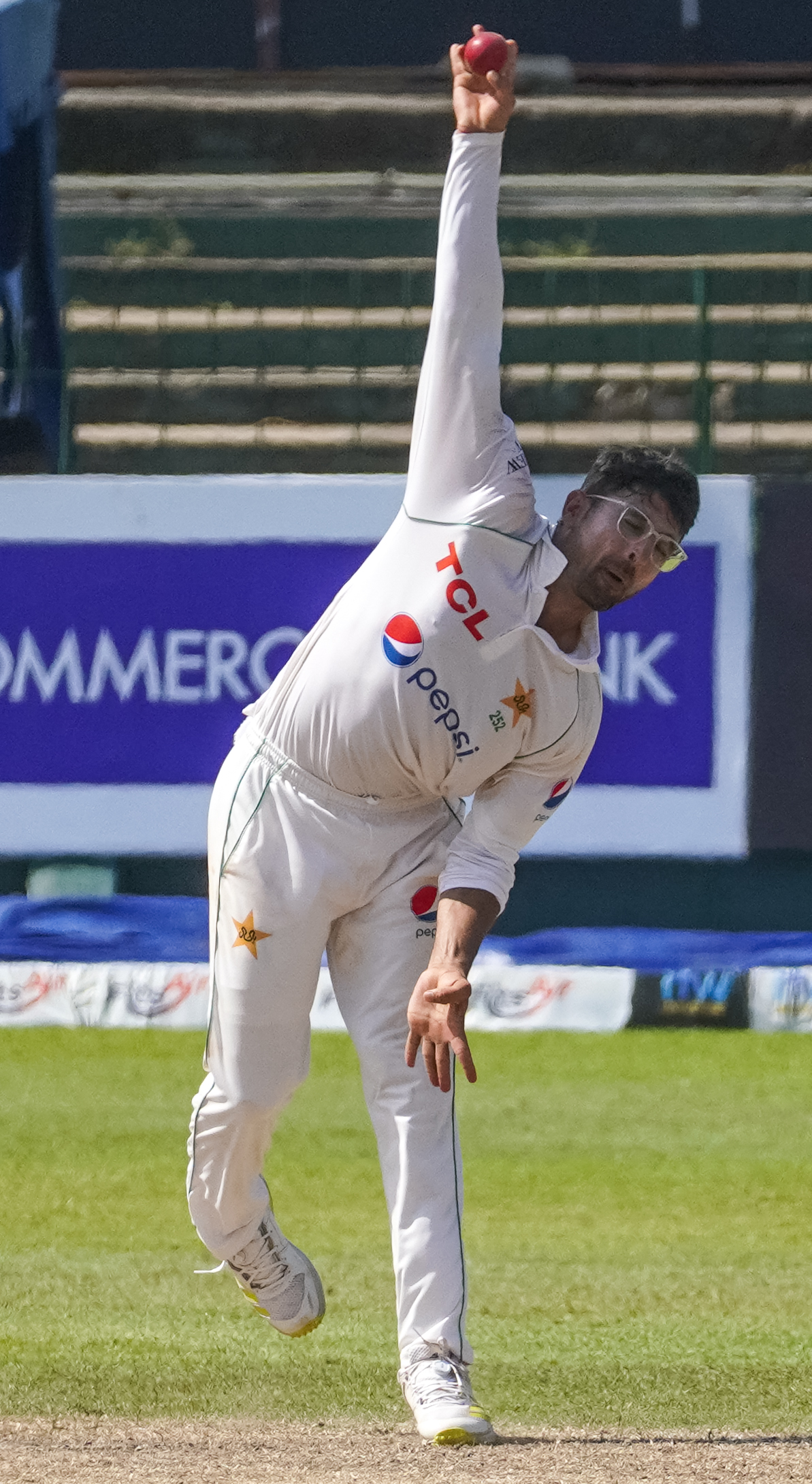

Personal information
- Born: 11 September 1998 (age 28); Karachi, Sindh, Pakistan
- Nickname: Harry Potter
- Height: 6 ft (183 cm)
- Batting: Right-handed
- Bowling: Right-arm leg spin
- Role: Bowler

International information
- National side: Pakistan (2022–present)
- Test debut (cap 252): 9 December 2022 v England
- Last Test: 25 January 2025 v West Indies
- ODI debut (cap 248): 26 November 2024 v Zimbabwe
- Last ODI: 4 June 2026 v Australia
- ODI shirt no.: 40
- T20I debut (cap 114): 18 April 2024 v New Zealand
- Last T20I: 28 February 2026 v Sri Lanka
- T20I shirt no.: 40

Domestic team information
- Years: Team
- 2017-2019: Karachi Kings
- 2017: Karachi Whites
- 2020–21: Sindh
- 2023: Islamabad United
- 2024–present: Quetta Gladiators
- 2026: Sunrisers Leeds

Career statistics
Competition	Test	ODI	T20I	FC
Matches	10	19	38	27
Runs scored	68	28	4	215
Batting average	8.50	14.00	1.33	10.23
100s/50s	0/0	0/0	0/0	0/0
Top score	17	23*	2	26
Balls bowled	2,631	1,044	812	6,939
Wickets	46	35	52	133
Bowling average	34.34	21.51	17.36	29.18
5 wickets in innings	2	0	0	9
10 wickets in match	1	0	0	3
Best bowling	7/114	4/27	4/9	7/114
Catches/stumpings	3/–	6/–	8/–	12/–
Medal record
Men's cricket
Representing Pakistan
Asia Cup
Runner-up	2025 UAE
Asian Games
Silver medal – second place	2026 Aichi–Nagoya	Team
- Source: ESPNcricinfo, 15 August 2026

Abrar Ahmed (born 11 September 1998) is a Pakistani cricketer who plays as a leg spin bowler. He was called up to the Pakistan national cricket team in December 2022 for the home Test series against England. Ahmed made his Test debut on 9 December 2022 in the second match of the series at the Multan Cricket Stadium, taking 7 wickets for 114 runs in the first innings and 4 for 120 in the second, becoming the first Pakistani bowler to claim a ten-wicket haul on debut since 1995.

== Early life ==
Born in Karachi, Ahmed is the youngest among eight siblings (five brothers and three sisters), with his brother Shahzad Khan previously playing as a fast bowler for National Bank. He is a hafiz, having memorized the entire Qur'an.

He has cited his elder brother as the reason his talent was recognised early on in tape ball cricket. Ahmed describes his mother and siblings as supportive from the beginning, but his father was eventually won over too and is now also supportive of his career. Upon being asked on his father's stance in a 2023 interview, he responded that his father is "very happy now".

An ethnic Pashtun of the Swati tribe, his family moved to Karachi from Shinkiari, a small village located on the outskirts of Mansehra in Khyber Pakhtunkhwa.

== Domestic career ==
A product of the Rashid Latif Academy, he made his Twenty20 debut for Karachi Kings on 10 February 2017 in the 2017 Pakistan Super League. He made his first-class debut on 20 November 2020, for Sindh, in the 2020–21 Quaid-e-Azam Trophy. In October 2021, he was named in the Pakistan Shaheens squad for their tour of Sri Lanka. He made his List A debut on 11 November 2021, for the Pakistan Shaheens against the Sri Lanka A cricket team.

Ahmed was picked by Islamabad United at the draft for the 2023 Pakistan Super League. Ahead of the 2024 Pakistan Super League, he was traded to the Quetta Gladiators.

== International career ==
In December 2022, Ahmed made his debut for Pakistan in the 2nd Test of the series against England. He became the first Pakistani bowler to take a 5-wicket haul in the first session on Test debut, taking 7 for 114 overall in the first innings and 4 for 120 in the second. He also became the thirteenth Pakistani bowler to take five-wicket haul on Test debut.

He was then named in the Pakistan squad for the Test series in the series against New Zealand, and in the first innings of the first Test he picked up another 5 wicket haul.

In May 2024, he was named in Pakistan's squad for the 2024 ICC Men's T20 World Cup tournament.

Ahmed made his ODI debut against Zimbabwe on November 26, 2024, at Bulawayo. He took 4 wickets for 33 runs, helping Pakistan restrict Zimbabwe to 145 runs and equalize the series 1–1.

In September 2025, during the 2025 Asia Cup, his bowling against Sri Lanka was applauded, producing a suffocating spell of 4–0–8–1 (econ 2.00) with 16 dot balls. Analysts noted Abrar's 1/8 as a T20 Asia Cup record-low four-over return.

In November 2025, in the third and final ODI of the home series against South Africa, Abrar produced a career-best performance of 4/27 to lead Pakistan to a seven-wicket, securing a 2–1 series win. Batting first, South Africa reached 72 without loss before collapsing to 143 all out in 37.5 overs, as Abrar triggered the collapse with three wickets in two overs. Pakistan chased down the target of 144 with 24.5 overs to spare, marking their third consecutive ODI series win over South Africa. Abrar was declared Player of the Match.

In June 2026, he was named in the 15-member men's squad announced for the 2026 Asian Games. On 3 October 2026, Pakistan won the silver medal after losing in the Asian Games men’s cricket final against India at the Kōrogi Athletic Park in Nisshin, Japan.

=== Injury ===
In late 2023, Ahmed was diagnosed with sciatica, a condition that caused leg pain and numbness, during Pakistan's preparations for the 2023 ICC Cricket World Cup. The injury, sustained during a practice match in Australia, ruled him out of subsequent international fixtures, including the Test series that followed.
