= Player of the Series awards (cricket) =

Cricket award

In the sport of cricket, a Player of the Series or Player of the Tournament award is given to the outstanding player, who makes the most impact in a series or tournament.

== Test ==
=== Most Player of the Series awards ===
Awards	Player	Team	Series	Career
11	Ravichandran Ashwin	India	44	2011–2024
11	Muttiah Muralitharan	Sri Lanka	61	1992–2010
9	Jacques Kallis	South Africa	61	1995–2013
8	Imran Khan	Pakistan	28	1971–1992
8	Richard Hadlee	New Zealand	33	1973–1990
8	Shane Warne	Australia	46	1992–2007
7	Wasim Akram	Pakistan	43	1985–2002
7	Shivnarine Chanderpaul	West Indies	60	1994–2015
6	Malcolm Marshall	West Indies	21	1978–1991
6	Curtly Ambrose	West Indies	27	1988–2000
6	Steve Waugh	Australia	54	1985–2004
6	Joe Root	England	54	2012–present
Last updated: 3 December 2025

== ODI ==
=== Most Player of the Series awards ===
Awards	Player	Team	Series	Career
15	Sachin Tendulkar	India	108	1989–2012
12	Virat Kohli	India	76	2008–present
11	Sanath Jayasuriya	Sri Lanka	111	1989–2011
9	Shaun Pollock	South Africa	60	1996–2008
8	Chris Gayle	West Indies	71	1999–2019
Last updated: 6 December 2025

== T20I ==
=== Most Player of the Series awards ===
Awards	Player	Team	Series	Career
7	Virat Kohli	India	46	2010–2024
5	Suryakumar Yadav	India	25	2021–present
5	Wanindu Hasaranga	Sri Lanka	26	2019–present
5	Babar Azam	Pakistan	39	2016–present
5	David Warner	Australia	42	2009–2024
5	Shakib Al Hasan	Bangladesh	45	2006–2024
4	Tim Seifert	New Zealand	23	2018–present
4	Mohammad Rizwan	Pakistan	34	2015–present
4	Glenn Maxwell	Australia	43	2012–present
4	Mohammad Hafeez	Pakistan	48	2006–2021
4	Jos Buttler	England	51	2011–present
Last updated: 3 Dec 2025

== All formats ==
Note: Players in bold are still active in international cricket.

=== Most Player of the Series awards in international cricket ===
Awards	Player	Team	Series	Tests	ODIs	T20Is
22	**Virat Kohli**	India	168	3	12	7
20	Sachin Tendulkar	India	183	5	15	0
17	**Shakib Al Hasan**	Bangladesh	162	5	7	5
15	Jacques Kallis	South Africa	148	9	6	0
13	David Warner	Australia	126	5	3	5
13	Sanath Jayasuriya	Sri Lanka	176	2	11	0
12	**Ravichandran Ashwin**	India	105	11	0	1
12	Chris Gayle	West Indies	141	2	8	2
11	Shaun Pollock	South Africa	107	2	9	0
11	Shivnarine Chanderpaul	West Indies	136	7	4	0
11	Ricky Ponting	Australia	147	4	7	0
11	Muttiah Muralitharan	Sri Lanka	155	11	0	0
Last updated: 6 December 2025
