= International cricket in 2017–18 =

International cricket season

The 2017–18 international cricket season was from September 2017 to April 2018. 28 Test matches, 93 One Day Internationals (ODIs), and 44 Twenty20 Internationals (T20Is) were played during this period. Out of the 30 Test matches that were played four were day/night matches. The day/night Test match between South Africa and Zimbabwe was scheduled to last for only four days in duration, with the last such four-day Test match being played in 1973. The season started with India leading the Test cricket rankings, South Africa leading the ODI rankings, New Zealand leading the Twenty20 rankings, and England women leading the women's rankings. Additionally, the Laws of Cricket 2017 Code came into effect on 1 October 2017, superseding the 6th Edition of the 2000 Code of Laws, with many of the changes in the laws being incorporated into the ICC Standard Playing Conditions.

The season started with Australia's tour of India, which consisted of 5 ODIs and 3 T20Is. After this, 16 more bilateral series among the full member nations were scheduled for the remainder of the season. The most notable of these series was the 70th edition of The Ashes, which was held in Australia from November 2017 to January 2018. Other notable highlights included New Zealand beating England in a home Test series for the first since 1984 and South Africa beating Australia in a home Test series since 1970. Australia's tour of South Africa was also notable for the many disciplinary issues that occurred throughout, with the most serious of these incidents being a ball tampering scandal that resulted in Australian captain Steve Smith, vice captain David Warner, and Cameron Bancroft being suspended from international cricket for 12 months, 12 months, and 9 months respectively. In addition, the first two T20I Tri-Series (Trans-Tasman Tri-Series and the Nidahas Trophy) among Full Member nations ever were conducted.

The culmination of the 2019 ICC Cricket World Cup qualification process occurred in this season. The start of this season marked the cut off date for direct qualification for the World Cup from the ICC ODI Championship. The top eight teams at the cut off date gained direct qualification to the World Cup while the bottom four teams (West Indies, Zimbabwe, Ireland, Afghanistan) went into the 2018 Cricket World Cup Qualifier. These four teams were joined by the top four teams of the World Cricket League Championship and the top two teams of the World Cricket League Division Two to make up the ten teams that played in the World Cup Qualifier.

The final two rounds (rounds 6 and 7) of the World Cricket League Championship concluded in this season, with the top 4 teams (Netherlands, Scotland, Papua New Guinea, Hong Kong) qualifying for the 2018 Cricket World Cup Qualifier. In addition, the Netherlands gained One Day International Status by winning the World Cricket League Championship and qualified for the 2020–23 ICC Cricket World Cup Super League. The bottom four teams (Kenya, Nepal, United Arab Emirates, Namibia) were relegated to World Cricket League Division Two for a chance to qualify for the final two spots of the World Cup Qualifier. These four teams were joined by Canada and Oman, the top two placed teams in the World Cricket League Division Three. The United Arab Emirates and Nepal finished in the top two and thus qualified for the World Cup Qualifier while Oman and Kenya finished in the bottom two and were relegated to Division Three. In the World Cup Qualifier, West Indies and Afghanistan were the top two finishers and thus qualified for the World Cup.

In addition, the Intercontinental Cup concluded during this season, with matches in rounds 6 and 7 played in this period. Afghanistan won the tournament after finishing at the top of the table with the most points.

Finally, the qualification process for the 2020 ICC T20 World Cup got underway with the Americas Southern Sub Region Qualifier, which saw Bermuda and Cayman Islands qualify for the Americas Regional Qualifier. The Asia Western Sub Region Qualifier was also conducted, with the UAE, Qatar, and Kuwait qualifying for the Asia Regional Qualifier. The Africa North-Western Sub Region Qualifier saw Ghana and Nigeria qualify for the Africa Region Qualifier.

== Season overview ==
Men's international tours
Start date	Home team	Away team	Results [Matches]				
Start date	Home team	Away team	Test	ODI	T20I	FC	LA
17 September 2017	India	Australia	—	4–1 [5]	1–1 [3]	—	—
27 September 2017	Zimbabwe	Netherlands	—	—	—	—	2–1 [3]
28 September 2017	(United Arab Emirates) Pakistan	Sri Lanka	0–2 [2]	5–0 [5]	3–0 [3]	—	—
28 September 2017	South Africa	Bangladesh	2–0 [2]	3–0 [3]	2–0 [2]	—	—
1 October 2017	PNG	Scotland	—	1–1 [2]	—	0–0 [1]	—
6 October 2017	Kenya	Netherlands	—	—	—	—	1–1 [2]
13 October 2017	Hong Kong	Nepal	—	—	—	—	1–0 [2]
20 October 2017	Hong Kong	Afghanistan	—	—	—	0–1 [1]	—
21 October 2017	Zimbabwe	West Indies	0–1 [2]	—	—	—	—
22 October 2017	India	New Zealand	—	2–1 [3]	2–1 [3]	—	—
16 November 2017	India	Sri Lanka	1–0 [3]	2–1 [3]	3–0 [3]	—	—
23 November 2017	Australia	England	4–0 [5]	1–4 [5]	—	—	—
24 November 2017	(United Arab Emirates) Scotland	PNG	—	2–0 [2]	—	—	—
29 November 2017	(United Arab Emirates) Hong Kong	PNG	—	2–0 [2]	—	1–0 [1]	—
29 November 2017	UAE	Afghanistan	—	—	—	0–1 [1]	—
29 November 2017	(United Arab Emirates) Namibia	Netherlands	—	—	—	0–1 [1]	0–2 [2]
29 November 2017	(United Arab Emirates) Ireland	Scotland	—	—	—	1–0 [1]	—
1 December 2017	New Zealand	West Indies	2–0 [2]	3–0 [3]	2–0 [3]	—	—
5 December 2017	(United Arab Emirates) Afghanistan	Ireland	—	1–2 [3]	—	—	—
6 December 2017	(United Arab Emirates) Kenya	Scotland	—	—	—	—	0–2 [2]
6 December 2017	UAE	Nepal	—	—	—	—	2–0 [2]
26 December 2017	South Africa	Zimbabwe	1–0 [1]	—	—	—	—
5 January 2018	South Africa	India	2–1 [3]	1–5 [6]	1–2 [3]	—	—
6 January 2018	New Zealand	Pakistan	—	5–0 [5]	1–2 [3]	—	—
31 January 2018	Bangladesh	Sri Lanka	0–1 [2]	—	0–2 [2]	—	—
5 February 2018	(United Arab Emirates) Afghanistan	Zimbabwe	—	4–1 [5]	2–0 [2]	—	—
25 February 2018	New Zealand	England	1–0 [2]	2–3 [5]	—	—	—
1 March 2018	South Africa	Australia	3–1 [4]	—	—	—	—
1 April 2018	Pakistan	West Indies	—	—	3–0 [3]	—	—
Men's international tournaments
Start date	Tournament				Winners		
11 January 2018	2017–18 United Arab Emirates Tri-Nation Series				Ireland		
13 January 2018	(New Zealand) 2018 Under-19 Cricket World Cup				India		
15 January 2018	2017–18 Bangladesh Tri-Nation Series				Sri Lanka		
3 February 2018	(Australia) (New Zealand) 2017–18 Trans-Tasman Tri-Series				Australia		
8 February 2018	(Namibia) 2018 ICC World Cricket League Division Two				United Arab Emirates		
4 March 2018	(Zimbabwe) 2018 Cricket World Cup Qualifier				Afghanistan		
6 March 2018	(Sri Lanka) 2018 Nidahas Trophy				India		

Women's international tours
Start date	Home team	Away team	Results [Matches]		
Start date	Home team	Away team	WTest	WODI	WT20I
11 October 2017	West Indies	Sri Lanka	—	3–0 [3]	3–0 [3]
22 October 2017	Australia	England	0–0 [1]	2–1 [3]	1–2 [3]
31 October 2017	(United Arab Emirates) Pakistan	New Zealand	—	1–2 [3]	0–4 [4]
5 February 2018	South Africa	India	—	1–2 [3]	1–3 [5]
4 March 2018	New Zealand	West Indies	—	3–0 [3]	4–0 [5]
12 March 2018	India	Australia	—	0–3 [3]	—
20 March 2018	Sri Lanka	Pakistan	—	0–3 [3]	1–2 [3]
6 April 2018	India	England	—	2–1 [3]	—
Women's international tournaments
Start date	Tournament			Winners	
22 March 2018	2017–18 India women's Tri-Nation Series			Australia	

== Rankings ==
The following are the rankings at the beginning of the season:

ICC Test Championship 26 September 2017
Rank	Team	Matches	Points	Rating
1	India	36	4493	125
2	South Africa	31	3395	110
3	England	43	4497	105
4	New Zealand	32	3114	97
5	Australia	34	3294	97
6	Pakistan	31	2868	93
7	Sri Lanka	36	3229	90
8	West Indies	30	2260	75
9	Bangladesh	20	1471	74
10	Zimbabwe	10	0	0

ICC ODI Championship 10 September 2017
Rank	Team	Matches	Points	Rating
1	South Africa	50	5957	119
2	Australia	47	5505	117
3	India	45	5266	117
4	England	50	5645	113
5	New Zealand	46	5123	111
6	Pakistan	41	3885	95
7	Bangladesh	31	2905	94
8	Sri Lanka	59	5088	86
9	West Indies	36	2824	78
10	Afghanistan	30	1618	54
11	Zimbabwe	41	2129	52
12	Ireland	25	1028	41

ICC T20I Championship 18 September 2017
Rank	Team	Matches	Points	Rating
1	New Zealand	13	1625	125
2	Pakistan	20	2417	121
3	West Indies	20	2395	120
4	England	17	2029	119
5	India	20	2328	116
6	South Africa	18	1983	110
7	Australia	13	1431	110
8	Sri Lanka	21	1961	93
9	Afghanistan	25	2157	86
10	Bangladesh	15	1168	78
11	Scotland	11	737	67
12	Zimbabwe	13	842	65
13	United Arab Emirates	16	827	52
14	Netherlands	9	441	49
15	Hong Kong	13	599	46
16	Papua New Guinea	6	235	39
17	Oman	9	345	38
18	Ireland	15	534	36

ICC Women's Rankings 3 October 2017
Rank	Team	Matches	Points	Rating
1	England	34	4368	128
2	Australia	40	5137	128
3	New Zealand	43	5053	118
4	India	45	5216	116
5	West Indies	35	3544	101
6	South Africa	55	5112	93
7	Pakistan	39	2801	72
8	Sri Lanka	40	2696	67
9	Bangladesh	19	704	37
10	Ireland	17	504	30

== September ==
=== Australia in India ===
ODI series
No.	Date	Home captain	Away captain	Venue	Result
ODI 3910	17 September	Virat Kohli	Steve Smith	M. A. Chidambaram Stadium, Chennai	India by 26 runs (DLS)
ODI 3912	21 September	Virat Kohli	Steve Smith	Eden Gardens, Kolkata	India by 50 runs
ODI 3914	24 September	Virat Kohli	Steve Smith	Holkar Stadium, Indore	India by 5 wickets
ODI 3917	28 September	Virat Kohli	Steve Smith	M. Chinnaswamy Stadium, Bangalore	Australia by 21 runs
ODI 3919	1 October	Virat Kohli	Steve Smith	Vidarbha Cricket Association Stadium, Nagpur	India by 7 wickets
T20I series
No.	Date	Home captain	Away captain	Venue	Result
T20I 623	7 October	Virat Kohli	David Warner	JSCA International Stadium Complex, Ranchi	India by 9 wickets (DLS)
T20I 624	10 October	Virat Kohli	David Warner	Barsapara Cricket Stadium, Guwahati	Australia by 8 wickets
T20I 624a	13 October	Virat Kohli	David Warner	Rajiv Gandhi International Cricket Stadium, Hyderabad	Match abandoned

=== Netherlands in Zimbabwe ===
List A series
No.	Date	Home captain	Away captain	Venue	Result
1st List A	27 September	Graeme Cremer	Peter Borren	Harare Sports Club, Harare	Zimbabwe Select XI by 93 runs
2nd List A	29 September	Craig Ervine	Peter Borren	Harare Sports Club, Harare	Zimbabwe Select XI by 9 wickets
3rd List A	1 October	Sikandar Raza	Peter Borren	Harare Sports Club, Harare	KNCB XI by 5 wickets

=== Sri Lanka vs Pakistan in United Arab Emirates ===
Test series
No.	Date	Home captain	Away captain	Venue	Result
Test 2275	28 September–2 October	Sarfaraz Ahmed	Dinesh Chandimal	Sheikh Zayed Cricket Stadium, Abu Dhabi	Sri Lanka by 21 runs
Test 2278	6–10 October	Sarfaraz Ahmed	Dinesh Chandimal	Dubai International Cricket Stadium, Dubai	Sri Lanka by 68 runs
ODI series
No.	Date	Home captain	Away captain	Venue	Result
ODI 3922	13 October	Sarfaraz Ahmed	Upul Tharanga	Dubai International Cricket Stadium, Dubai	Pakistan by 83 runs
ODI 3924	16 October	Sarfaraz Ahmed	Upul Tharanga	Sheikh Zayed Cricket Stadium, Abu Dhabi	Pakistan by 32 runs
ODI 3926	18 October	Sarfaraz Ahmed	Upul Tharanga	Sheikh Zayed Cricket Stadium, Abu Dhabi	Pakistan by 7 wickets
ODI 3927	20 October	Sarfaraz Ahmed	Upul Tharanga	Sharjah Cricket Stadium, Sharjah	Pakistan by 7 wickets
ODI 3930	23 October	Sarfaraz Ahmed	Upul Tharanga	Sharjah Cricket Stadium, Sharjah	Pakistan by 9 wickets
T20I series
No.	Date	Home captain	Away captain	Venue	Result
T20I 625	26 October	Sarfaraz Ahmed	Thisara Perera	Sheikh Zayed Cricket Stadium, Abu Dhabi	Pakistan by 7 wickets
T20I 627	27 October	Sarfaraz Ahmed	Thisara Perera	Sheikh Zayed Cricket Stadium, Abu Dhabi	Pakistan by 2 wickets
T20I 629	29 October	Sarfaraz Ahmed	Thisara Perera	Gaddafi Stadium, Lahore	Pakistan by 36 runs

=== Bangladesh in South Africa ===
Test series
No.	Date	Home captain	Away captain	Venue	Result
Test 2276	28 September–2 October	Faf du Plessis	Mushfiqur Rahim	Senwes Park, Potchefstroom	South Africa by 333 runs
Test 2277	6–10 October	Faf du Plessis	Mushfiqur Rahim	Mangaung Oval, Bloemfontein	South Africa by an innings and 254 runs
ODI series
No.	Date	Home captain	Away captain	Venue	Result
ODI 3923	15 October	Faf du Plessis	Mashrafe Mortaza	De Beers Diamond Oval, Kimberley	South Africa by 10 wickets
ODI 3925	18 October	Faf du Plessis	Mashrafe Mortaza	Boland Bank Park, Paarl	South Africa by 104 runs
ODI 3929	22 October	Faf du Plessis	Mashrafe Mortaza	Buffalo Park, East London	South Africa by 200 runs
T20I series
No.	Date	Home captain	Away captain	Venue	Result
T20I 626	26 October	JP Duminy	Shakib Al Hasan	Mangaung Oval, Bloemfontein	South Africa by 20 runs
T20I 628	29 October	JP Duminy	Shakib Al Hasan	Senwes Park, Potchefstroom	South Africa by 83 runs

== October ==
=== Scotland in Papua New Guinea ===
2015–17 ICC Intercontinental Cup – FC series
No.	Date	Home captain	Away captain	Venue	Result
First-class	1–4 October	Assad Vala	Kyle Coetzer	Amini Park, Port Moresby	Match drawn
2015–17 ICC World Cricket League Championship – ODI series
No.	Date	Home captain	Away captain	Venue	Result
ODI 3920	6 October	Assad Vala	Kyle Coetzer	Amini Park, Port Moresby	Scotland by 101 runs
ODI 3921	8 October	Assad Vala	Kyle Coetzer	Amini Park, Port Moresby	Papua New Guinea by 5 wickets

=== Netherlands vs Kenya in South Africa ===
2015–17 ICC World Cricket League Championship – List A series
No.	Date	Home captain	Away captain	Venue	Result
1st List A	6 October	Rakep Patel	Peter Borren	Buffalo Park, East London	Netherlands by 6 wickets
2nd List A	8 October	Rakep Patel	Peter Borren	Buffalo Park, East London	Kenya by 2 wickets

=== Sri Lanka women in West Indies ===
2017–20 ICC Women's Championship – WODI series
No.	Date	Home captain	Away captain	Venue	Result
WODI 1086	11 October	Stafanie Taylor	Inoka Ranaweera	Brian Lara Cricket Academy, Trinidad	West Indies by 6 wickets
WODI 1087	13 October	Stafanie Taylor	Inoka Ranaweera	Brian Lara Cricket Academy, Trinidad	West Indies by 7 wickets
WODI 1088	15 October	Stafanie Taylor	Inoka Ranaweera	Brian Lara Cricket Academy, Trinidad	West Indies by 40 runs
WT20I series
No.	Date	Home captain	Away captain	Venue	Result
WT20I 384	19 October	Stafanie Taylor	Inoka Ranaweera	Coolidge Cricket Ground, Antigua	West Indies by 71 runs
WT20I 385	21 October	Stafanie Taylor	Inoka Ranaweera	Coolidge Cricket Ground, Antigua	West Indies by 47 runs
WT20I 386	22 October	Stafanie Taylor	Inoka Ranaweera	Coolidge Cricket Ground, Antigua	West Indies by 31 runs

=== Nepal in Hong Kong ===
2015–17 ICC World Cricket League Championship – List A series
No.	Date	Home captain	Away captain	Venue	Result
1st List A	13 October	Babar Hayat	Paras Khadka	Mission Road Ground, Mong Kok	Hong Kong by 83 runs
2nd List A	15–16 October	Babar Hayat	Paras Khadka	Mission Road Ground, Mong Kok	Match abandoned

=== Afghanistan in Hong Kong ===
2015–17 ICC Intercontinental Cup – FC series
No.	Date	Home captain	Away captain	Venue	Result
First-class	20–23 October	Babar Hayat	Asghar Stanikzai	Mission Road Ground, Mong Kok	Afghanistan by an innings and 173 runs

=== West Indies in Zimbabwe ===
Clive Lloyd Trophy Test series
No.	Date	Home captain	Away captain	Venue	Result
Test 2279	21–25 October	Graeme Cremer	Jason Holder	Queens Sports Club, Bulawayo	West Indies by 117 runs
Test 2280	29 October–2 November	Graeme Cremer	Jason Holder	Queens Sports Club, Bulawayo	Match drawn

=== England women in Australia ===
2017–20 ICC Women's Championship – WODI series
No.	Date	Home captain	Away captain	Venue	Result
WODI 1089	22 October	Rachael Haynes	Heather Knight	Allan Border Field, Brisbane	Australia by 2 wickets
WODI 1090	26 October	Rachael Haynes	Heather Knight	Coffs Harbour International Stadium, Coffs Harbour	Australia by 75 runs (DLS)
WODI 1091	29 October	Rachael Haynes	Heather Knight	Coffs Harbour International Stadium, Coffs Harbour	England by 20 runs (DLS)
Test series
No.	Date	Home captain	Away captain	Venue	Result
WTest 139	9–12 November	Rachael Haynes	Heather Knight	North Sydney Oval, Sydney	Match drawn
WT20I series
No.	Date	Home captain	Away captain	Venue	Result
WT20I 391	17 November	Rachael Haynes	Heather Knight	North Sydney Oval, Sydney	Australia by 6 wickets
WT20I 392	19 November	Rachael Haynes	Heather Knight	Manuka Oval, Canberra	England by 40 runs
WT20I 393	21 November	Rachael Haynes	Heather Knight	Manuka Oval, Canberra	England by 4 wickets

=== New Zealand in India ===
ODI series
No.	Date	Home captain	Away captain	Venue	Result
ODI 3928	22 October	Virat Kohli	Kane Williamson	Wankhede Stadium, Mumbai	New Zealand by 6 wickets
ODI 3931	25 October	Virat Kohli	Kane Williamson	Maharashtra Cricket Association Stadium, Pune	India by 6 wickets
ODI 3932	29 October	Virat Kohli	Kane Williamson	Green Park Stadium, Kanpur	India by 6 runs
T20I series
No.	Date	Home captain	Away captain	Venue	Result
T20I 630	1 November	Virat Kohli	Kane Williamson	Feroz Shah Kotla Ground, Delhi	India by 53 runs
T20I 631	4 November	Virat Kohli	Kane Williamson	Saurashtra Cricket Association Stadium, Rajkot	New Zealand by 40 runs
T20I 632	7 November	Virat Kohli	Kane Williamson	Greenfield International Stadium, Thiruvananthapuram	India by 6 runs

=== New Zealand women vs Pakistan in United Arab Emirates ===
2017–20 ICC Women's Championship – WODI series
No.	Date	Home captain	Away captain	Venue	Result
WODI 1092	31 October	Bismah Maroof	Suzie Bates	Sharjah Cricket Stadium, Sharjah	New Zealand by 8 runs
WODI 1093	2 November	Bismah Maroof	Suzie Bates	Sharjah Cricket Stadium, Sharjah	New Zealand by 7 wickets
WODI 1094	5 November	Bismah Maroof	Suzie Bates	Sharjah Cricket Stadium, Sharjah	Pakistan by 5 wickets
WT20I series
No.	Date	Home captain	Away captain	Venue	Result
WT20I 387	8 November	Bismah Maroof	Suzie Bates	Sharjah Cricket Stadium, Sharjah	New Zealand by 15 runs
WT20I 388	9 November	Bismah Maroof	Suzie Bates	Sharjah Cricket Stadium, Sharjah	New Zealand by 39 runs
WT20I 389	12 November	Bismah Maroof	Suzie Bates	Sharjah Cricket Stadium, Sharjah	New Zealand by 42 runs
WT20I 390	14 November	Bismah Maroof	Suzie Bates	Sharjah Cricket Stadium, Sharjah	New Zealand by 7 wickets

== November ==
=== Sri Lanka in India ===
Test series
No.	Date	Home captain	Away captain	Venue	Result
Test 2281	16–20 November	Virat Kohli	Dinesh Chandimal	Eden Gardens, Kolkata	Match drawn
Test 2283	24–28 November	Virat Kohli	Dinesh Chandimal	Vidarbha Cricket Association Stadium, Nagpur	India by an innings and 239 runs
Test 2286	2–6 December	Virat Kohli	Dinesh Chandimal	Feroz Shah Kotla Ground, Delhi	Match drawn
ODI series
No.	Date	Home captain	Away captain	Venue	Result
ODI 3939	10 December	Rohit Sharma	Thisara Perera	Himachal Pradesh Cricket Association Stadium, Dharamshala	Sri Lanka by 7 wickets
ODI 3941	13 December	Rohit Sharma	Thisara Perera	Punjab Cricket Association IS Bindra Stadium, Mohali	India by 141 runs
ODI 3942	17 December	Rohit Sharma	Thisara Perera	Dr. Y.S. Rajasekhara Reddy ACA-VDCA Cricket Stadium, Visakhapatnam	India by 8 wickets
T20I series
No.	Date	Home captain	Away captain	Venue	Result
T20I 633	20 December	Rohit Sharma	Thisara Perera	Barabati Stadium, Cuttack	India by 93 runs
T20I 634	22 December	Rohit Sharma	Thisara Perera	Holkar Stadium, Indore	India by 88 runs
T20I 635	24 December	Rohit Sharma	Thisara Perera	Wankhede Stadium, Mumbai	India by 5 wickets

=== England in Australia ===
The Ashes Test series
No.	Date	Home captain	Away captain	Venue	Result
Test 2282	23–27 November	Steve Smith	Joe Root	The Gabba, Brisbane	Australia by 10 wickets
Test 2285	2–6 December	Steve Smith	Joe Root	Adelaide Oval, Adelaide	Australia by 120 runs
Test 2288	14–18 December	Steve Smith	Joe Root	WACA Ground, Perth	Australia by an innings and 41 runs
Test 2289	26–30 December	Steve Smith	Joe Root	Melbourne Cricket Ground, Melbourne	Match drawn
Test 2291	4–8 January	Steve Smith	Joe Root	Sydney Cricket Ground, Sydney	Australia by an innings and 123 runs
ODI series
No.	Date	Home captain	Away captain	Venue	Result
ODI 3951	14 January	Steve Smith	Eoin Morgan	Melbourne Cricket Ground, Melbourne	England by 5 wickets
ODI 3958	19 January	Steve Smith	Eoin Morgan	The Gabba, Brisbane	England by 4 wickets
ODI 3960	21 January	Steve Smith	Eoin Morgan	Sydney Cricket Ground, Sydney	England by 16 runs
ODI 3966	26 January	Steve Smith	Eoin Morgan	Adelaide Oval, Adelaide	Australia by 3 wickets
ODI 3968	28 January	Steve Smith	Eoin Morgan	Perth Stadium, Perth	England by 12 runs

=== Scotland vs Papua New Guinea in United Arab Emirates ===
ODI series
No.	Date	Home captain	Away captain	Venue	Result
ODI 3933	24 November	Assad Vala	Kyle Coetzer	Dubai International Cricket Stadium, Dubai	Scotland by 6 wickets
ODI 3934	25 November	Assad Vala	Kyle Coetzer	Dubai International Cricket Stadium, Dubai	Scotland by 4 wickets

=== Hong Kong vs Papua New Guinea in United Arab Emirates ===
2015–17 ICC Intercontinental Cup – FC series
No.	Date	Home captain	Away captain	Venue	Result
First-class	29 November–2 December	Babar Hayat	Assad Vala	Sharjah Cricket Stadium, Sharjah	Hong Kong by an innings and 29 runs
2015–17 ICC World Cricket League Championship – ODI series
No.	Date	Home captain	Away captain	Venue	Result
ODI 3936	6 December	Babar Hayat	Assad Vala	ICC Academy Ground 1, Dubai	Hong Kong by 23 runs
ODI 3938	8 December	Babar Hayat	Assad Vala	ICC Academy Ground 1, Dubai	Hong Kong by 93 runs

=== Afghanistan in United Arab Emirates ===
2015–17 ICC Intercontinental Cup – FC series
No.	Date	Home captain	Away captain	Venue	Result
First-class	29 November–2 December	Rohan Mustafa	Asghar Stanikzai	Sheikh Zayed Stadium, Abu Dhabi	Afghanistan by 10 wickets

=== Namibia vs Netherlands in United Arab Emirates ===
2015–17 ICC Intercontinental Cup – FC series
No.	Date	Home captain	Away captain	Venue	Result
First-class	29 November–2 December	Sarel Burger	Peter Borren	ICC Academy Ground 1, Dubai	Netherlands by 231 runs
2015–17 ICC World Cricket League Championship – List A series
No.	Date	Home captain	Away captain	Venue	Result
1st List A	6 December	Sarel Burger	Peter Borren	ICC Academy Ground 2, Dubai	Netherlands by 8 wickets
2nd List A	8 December	Sarel Burger	Peter Borren	ICC Academy Ground 2, Dubai	Netherlands by 5 wickets

=== Ireland vs Scotland in United Arab Emirates ===
2015–17 ICC Intercontinental Cup – FC series
No.	Date	Home captain	Away captain	Venue	Result
First-class	29 November–2 December	William Porterfield	Kyle Coetzer	Dubai International Cricket Stadium, Dubai	Ireland by 203 runs

== December ==
=== West Indies in New Zealand ===
Test series
No.	Date	Home captain	Away captain	Venue	Result
Test 2284	1–5 December	Kane Williamson	Jason Holder	Basin Reserve, Wellington	New Zealand by an innings and 67 runs
Test 2287	9–13 December	Kane Williamson	Kraigg Brathwaite	Seddon Park, Hamilton	New Zealand by 240 runs
ODI series
No.	Date	Home captain	Away captain	Venue	Result
ODI 3943	20 December	Kane Williamson	Jason Holder	Cobham Oval, Whangārei	New Zealand by 5 wickets
ODI 3944	23 December	Tom Latham	Jason Holder	Hagley Oval, Christchurch	New Zealand by 204 runs
ODI 3945	26 December	Tom Latham	Jason Holder	Hagley Oval, Christchurch	New Zealand by 66 runs (DLS)
T20I series
No.	Date	Home captain	Away captain	Venue	Result
T20I 636	29 December	Tim Southee	Carlos Brathwaite	Saxton Oval, Nelson	New Zealand by 47 runs
T20I 637	1 January	Kane Williamson	Carlos Brathwaite	Bay Oval, Mount Maunganui	No result
T20I 638	3 January	Kane Williamson	Carlos Brathwaite	Bay Oval, Mount Maunganui	New Zealand by 119 runs

=== Ireland vs Afghanistan in United Arab Emirates ===
ODI series
No.	Date	Home captain	Away captain	Venue	Result
ODI 3935	5 December	Asghar Stanikzai	William Porterfield	Sharjah Cricket Stadium, Sharjah	Afghanistan by 138 runs
ODI 3937	7 December	Asghar Stanikzai	William Porterfield	Sharjah Cricket Stadium, Sharjah	Ireland by 51 runs
ODI 3940	10 December	Asghar Stanikzai	William Porterfield	Sharjah Cricket Stadium, Sharjah	Ireland by 5 wickets

=== Kenya vs Scotland in United Arab Emirates ===
2015–17 ICC World Cricket League Championship – List A series
No.	Date	Home captain	Away captain	Venue	Result
1st List A	6 December	Rakep Patel	Kyle Coetzer	Dubai International Cricket Stadium, Dubai	Scotland by 8 wickets
2nd List A	8 December	Rakep Patel	Kyle Coetzer	Dubai International Cricket Stadium, Dubai	Scotland by 161 runs

=== Nepal in United Arab Emirates ===
2015–17 ICC World Cricket League Championship – List A series
No.	Date	Home captain	Away captain	Venue	Result
1st List A	6 December	Rohan Mustafa	Paras Khadka	Sheikh Zayed Cricket Stadium, Abu Dhabi	United Arab Emirates by 7 wickets
2nd List A	8 December	Rohan Mustafa	Paras Khadka	Sheikh Zayed Cricket Stadium, Abu Dhabi	United Arab Emirates by 63 runs

=== Zimbabwe in South Africa ===
Test series
No.	Date	Home captain	Away captain	Venue	Result
Test 2290	26–29 December	AB de Villiers	Graeme Cremer	St George's Park, Port Elizabeth	South Africa by an innings and 120 runs

== January ==
=== India in South Africa ===
Freedom Trophy Test series
No.	Date	Home captain	Away captain	Venue	Result
Test 2292	5–9 January	Faf du Plessis	Virat Kohli	Newlands Cricket Ground, Cape Town	South Africa by 72 runs
Test 2293	13–17 January	Faf du Plessis	Virat Kohli	Centurion Park, Centurion	South Africa by 135 runs
Test 2294	24–28 January	Faf du Plessis	Virat Kohli	Wanderers Stadium, Johannesburg	India by 63 runs
ODI series
No.	Date	Home captain	Away captain	Venue	Result
ODI 3969	1 February	Faf du Plessis	Virat Kohli	Kingsmead Cricket Ground, Durban	India by 6 wickets
ODI 3970	4 February	Aiden Markram	Virat Kohli	Centurion Park, Centurion	India by 9 wickets
ODI 3971	7 February	Aiden Markram	Virat Kohli	Newlands Cricket Ground, Cape Town	India by 124 runs
ODI 3973	10 February	Aiden Markram	Virat Kohli	Wanderers Stadium, Johannesburg	South Africa by 5 wickets (DLS)
ODI 3976	13 February	Aiden Markram	Virat Kohli	St George's Park, Port Elizabeth	India by 73 runs
ODI 3978	16 February	Aiden Markram	Virat Kohli	Centurion Park, Centurion	India by 8 wickets
T20I series
No.	Date	Home captain	Away captain	Venue	Result
T20I 652	18 February	JP Duminy	Virat Kohli	Wanderers Stadium, Johannesburg	India by 28 runs
T20I 654	21 February	JP Duminy	Virat Kohli	Centurion Park, Centurion	South Africa by 6 wickets
T20I 655	24 February	JP Duminy	Rohit Sharma	Newlands Cricket Ground, Cape Town	India by 7 runs

=== Pakistan in New Zealand ===
ODI series
No.	Date	Home captain	Away captain	Venue	Result
ODI 3946	6 January	Kane Williamson	Sarfaraz Ahmed	Basin Reserve, Wellington	New Zealand by 61 runs (DLS)
ODI 3947	9 January	Kane Williamson	Sarfaraz Ahmed	Saxton Oval, Nelson	New Zealand by 8 wickets (DLS)
ODI 3949	13 January	Kane Williamson	Sarfaraz Ahmed	University Oval, Dunedin	New Zealand by 183 runs
ODI 3953	16 January	Kane Williamson	Sarfaraz Ahmed	Seddon Park, Hamilton	New Zealand by 5 wickets
ODI 3957	19 January	Kane Williamson	Sarfaraz Ahmed	Basin Reserve, Wellington	New Zealand by 15 runs
T20I series
No.	Date	Home captain	Away captain	Venue	Result
T20I 639	22 January	Tim Southee	Sarfaraz Ahmed	Wellington Regional Stadium, Wellington	New Zealand by 7 wickets
T20I 640	25 January	Kane Williamson	Sarfaraz Ahmed	Eden Park, Auckland	Pakistan by 48 runs
T20I 641	28 January	Kane Williamson	Sarfaraz Ahmed	Bay Oval, Mount Maunganui	Pakistan by 18 runs

=== 2017–18 United Arab Emirates Tri-Nation Series ===
Pos	Team	Pld	W	L	T	NR	BP	Pts	NRR
1	Ireland	4	4	0	0	0	0	8	0.960
2	Scotland	4	1	3	0	0	0	2	−0.456
3	United Arab Emirates	4	1	3	0	0	0	2	−0.503

Source: Cricinfo

Tri-series
No.	Date	Team 1	Captain 1	Team 2	Captain 2	Venue	Result
ODI 3948	11 January	United Arab Emirates	Rohan Mustafa	Ireland	William Porterfield	ICC Academy 1, Dubai	Ireland by 4 wickets
ODI 3950	13 January	United Arab Emirates	Rohan Mustafa	Ireland	William Porterfield	ICC Academy 1, Dubai	Ireland by 67 runs
ODI 3954	16 January	Ireland	William Porterfield	Scotland	Richie Berrington	ICC Academy 1, Dubai	Ireland by 6 wickets
ODI 3956	18 January	Ireland	William Porterfield	Scotland	Richie Berrington	ICC Academy 1, Dubai	Ireland by 24 runs
ODI 3961	21 January	United Arab Emirates	Rohan Mustafa	Scotland	Kyle Coetzer	ICC Academy 1, Dubai	Scotland by 31 runs
ODI 3963	23 January	United Arab Emirates	Rohan Mustafa	Scotland	Kyle Coetzer	ICC Academy 1, Dubai	United Arab Emirates by 4 wickets

=== 2017–18 Bangladesh Tri-Nation Series ===
Pos	Team	Pld	W	L	T	NR	BP	Pts	NRR
1	Bangladesh	4	3	1	0	0	3	15	1.114
2	Sri Lanka	4	2	2	0	0	1	9	0.146
3	Zimbabwe	4	1	3	0	0	0	4	−1.087

Source: Cricinfo

Tri-series
No.	Date	Team 1	Captain 1	Team 2	Captain 2	Venue	Result
ODI 3952	15 January	Bangladesh	Mashrafe Mortaza	Zimbabwe	Graeme Cremer	Sher-e-Bangla National Cricket Stadium, Dhaka	Bangladesh by 8 wickets
ODI 3955	17 January	Sri Lanka	Angelo Mathews	Zimbabwe	Graeme Cremer	Sher-e-Bangla National Cricket Stadium, Dhaka	Zimbabwe by 12 runs
ODI 3959	19 January	Bangladesh	Mashrafe Mortaza	Sri Lanka	Dinesh Chandimal	Sher-e-Bangla National Cricket Stadium, Dhaka	Bangladesh by 163 runs
ODI 3962	21 January	Sri Lanka	Dinesh Chandimal	Zimbabwe	Graeme Cremer	Sher-e-Bangla National Cricket Stadium, Dhaka	Sri Lanka by 5 wickets
ODI 3964	23 January	Bangladesh	Mashrafe Mortaza	Zimbabwe	Graeme Cremer	Sher-e-Bangla National Cricket Stadium, Dhaka	Bangladesh by 91 runs
ODI 3965	25 January	Bangladesh	Mashrafe Mortaza	Sri Lanka	Dinesh Chandimal	Sher-e-Bangla National Cricket Stadium, Dhaka	Sri Lanka by 10 wickets
Final
ODI 3967	27 January	Bangladesh	Mashrafe Mortaza	Sri Lanka	Dinesh Chandimal	Sher-e-Bangla National Cricket Stadium, Dhaka	Sri Lanka by 79 runs

=== Sri Lanka in Bangladesh ===
Test series
No.	Date	Home captain	Away captain	Venue	Result
Test 2295	31 January–4 February	Mahmudullah	Dinesh Chandimal	Zohur Ahmed Chowdhury Stadium, Chittagong	Match drawn
Test 2296	8–12 February	Mahmudullah	Dinesh Chandimal	Sher-e-Bangla National Cricket Stadium, Dhaka	Sri Lanka by 215 runs
T20I series
No.	Date	Home captain	Away captain	Venue	Result
T20I 648	15 February	Mahmudullah	Dinesh Chandimal	Sher-e-Bangla National Cricket Stadium, Dhaka	Sri Lanka by 6 wickets
T20I 651	18 February	Mahmudullah	Dinesh Chandimal	Sylhet International Cricket Stadium, Sylhet	Sri Lanka by 75 runs

== February ==
=== 2017–18 Trans-Tasman Tri-Series ===
Pos	Team	Pld	W	L	T	NR	BP	Pts	NRR
1	Australia	4	4	0	0	0	0	8	1.719
2	New Zealand	4	1	3	0	0	0	2	−0.556
3	England	4	1	3	0	0	0	2	−1.036

Source: Cricinfo

Tri-series
No.	Date	Team 1	Captain 1	Team 2	Captain 2	Venue	Result
T20I 642	3 February	Australia	David Warner	New Zealand	Kane Williamson	Sydney Cricket Ground, Sydney	Australia by 7 wickets (DLS)
T20I 645	7 February	Australia	David Warner	England	Eoin Morgan	Bellerive Oval, Hobart	Australia by 5 wickets
T20I 646	10 February	Australia	David Warner	England	Jos Buttler	Melbourne Cricket Ground, Melbourne	Australia by 7 wickets
T20I 647	13 February	New Zealand	Kane Williamson	England	Jos Buttler	Wellington Regional Stadium, Wellington	New Zealand by 12 runs
T20I 649	16 February	New Zealand	Kane Williamson	Australia	David Warner	Eden Park, Auckland	Australia by 5 wickets
T20I 650	18 February	New Zealand	Kane Williamson	England	Eoin Morgan	Seddon Park, Hamilton	England by 2 runs
Final
T20I 653	21 February	New Zealand	Kane Williamson	Australia	David Warner	Eden Park, Auckland	Australia by 19 runs (DLS)

=== Afghanistan vs Zimbabwe in United Arab Emirates ===
T20I series
No.	Date	Home captain	Away captain	Venue	Result
T20I 643	5 February	Asghar Stanikzai	Graeme Cremer	Sharjah Cricket Stadium, Sharjah	Afghanistan by 5 wickets
T20I 644	6 February	Asghar Stanikzai	Graeme Cremer	Sharjah Cricket Stadium, Sharjah	Afghanistan by 17 runs
ODI series
No.	Date	Home captain	Away captain	Venue	Result
ODI 3972	9 February	Asghar Stanikzai	Graeme Cremer	Sharjah Cricket Stadium, Sharjah	Afghanistan by 154 runs
ODI 3974	11 February	Asghar Stanikzai	Graeme Cremer	Sharjah Cricket Stadium, Sharjah	Zimbabwe by 154 runs
ODI 3975	13 February	Asghar Stanikzai	Graeme Cremer	Sharjah Cricket Stadium, Sharjah	Afghanistan by 6 wickets
ODI 3977	16 February	Asghar Stanikzai	Graeme Cremer	Sharjah Cricket Stadium, Sharjah	Afghanistan by 10 wickets
ODI 3979	19 February	Asghar Stanikzai	Graeme Cremer	Sharjah Cricket Stadium, Sharjah	Afghanistan by 146 runs

=== India women in South Africa ===
2017–20 ICC Women's Championship – WODI series
No.	Date	Home captain	Away captain	Venue	Result
WODI 1095	5 February	Dane van Niekerk	Mithali Raj	Diamond Oval, Kimberley	India by 88 runs
WODI 1096	7 February	Dane van Niekerk	Mithali Raj	Diamond Oval, Kimberley	India by 178 runs
WODI 1097	10 February	Dane van Niekerk	Mithali Raj	Senwes Park, Potchefstroom	South Africa by 7 wickets
WT20I series
No.	Date	Home captain	Away captain	Venue	Result
WT20I 394	13 February	Dane van Niekerk	Harmanpreet Kaur	Senwes Park, Potchefstroom	India by 7 wickets
WT20I 395	16 February	Dane van Niekerk	Harmanpreet Kaur	Buffalo Park, East London	India by 9 wickets
WT20I 396	18 February	Dane van Niekerk	Harmanpreet Kaur	Wanderers Stadium, Johannesburg	South Africa by 5 wickets
WT20I 397	21 February	Dane van Niekerk	Harmanpreet Kaur	Centurion Park, Centurion	No result
WT20I 398	24 February	Dane van Niekerk	Harmanpreet Kaur	Newlands Cricket Ground, Cape Town	India by 54 runs

=== 2018 ICC World Cricket League Division Two ===
Pos	Team	Pld	W	L	T	NR	Pts	NRR	Qualification or relegation
1	Nepal	5	4	1	0	0	8	−0.124	Met in the final and advanced to the 2018 Cricket World Cup Qualifier
2	United Arab Emirates	5	3	2	0	0	6	1.034	Met in the final and advanced to the 2018 Cricket World Cup Qualifier
3	Canada	5	3	2	0	0	6	0.868	Met in the 3rd-place playoff and remain in Division Two
4	Namibia	5	3	2	0	0	6	0.566	Met in the 3rd-place playoff and remain in Division Two
5	Oman	5	2	3	0	0	4	−0.508	Met in the 5th-place playoff and relegated to 2018 Division Three
6	Kenya	5	0	5	0	0	0	−1.834	Met in the 5th-place playoff and relegated to 2018 Division Three

Source: Cricinfo

Group Stage
No.	Date	Team 1	Captain 1	Team 2	Captain 2	Venue	Result
Match 1	8 February	Kenya	Rakep Patel	United Arab Emirates	Rohan Mustafa	Wanderers Cricket Ground, Windhoek	United Arab Emirates by 218 runs
Match 2	8 February	Namibia	Sarel Burger	Nepal	Paras Khadka	Affies Park, Windhoek	Nepal by 1 wicket
Match 3	8 February	Canada	Nitish Kumar	Oman	Sultan Ahmed	United Ground, Windhoek	Canada by 8 wickets
Match 4	9 February	Canada	Nitish Kumar	United Arab Emirates	Rohan Mustafa	Wanderers Cricket Ground, Windhoek	Canada by 23 runs
Match 5	9 February	Nepal	Paras Khadka	Oman	Sultan Ahmed	Affies Park, Windhoek	Oman by 6 wickets
Match 6	9–10 February	Namibia	Sarel Burger	Kenya	Rakep Patel	United Ground, Windhoek	No result
Match 7	11 February	Namibia	Sarel Burger	Oman	Sultan Ahmed	Wanderers Cricket Ground, Windhoek	Namibia by 2 wickets
Match 8	11 February	Canada	Nitish Kumar	Kenya	Rakep Patel	Affies Park, Windhoek	Canada by 59 runs
Match 9	11 February	Nepal	Paras Khadka	United Arab Emirates	Rohan Mustafa	United Ground, Windhoek	Nepal by 4 wickets
Match 10	12 February	Kenya	Rakep Patel	Nepal	Paras Khadka	Wanderers Cricket Ground, Windhoek	Nepal by 3 wickets
Match 11	12 February	Oman	Sultan Ahmed	United Arab Emirates	Rohan Mustafa	Affies Park, Windhoek	United Arab Emirates by 46 runs
Match 12	12 February	Namibia	Sarel Burger	Canada	Nitish Kumar	United Ground, Windhoek	Namibia by 17 runs
Match 6 (replay)	13 February	Namibia	Sarel Burger	Kenya	Rakep Patel	United Ground, Windhoek	Namibia by 8 wickets
Match 13	14 February	Canada	Nitish Kumar	Nepal	Paras Khadka	Wanderers Cricket Ground, Windhoek	Nepal by 1 wicket
Match 14	14 February	Namibia	Sarel Burger	United Arab Emirates	Rohan Mustafa	Affies Park, Windhoek	United Arab Emirates by 19 runs
Match 15	14 February	Kenya	Shem Ngoche	Oman	Sultan Ahmed	United Ground, Windhoek	Oman by 2 wickets (DLS)
Playoffs
Fifth-place playoff	15 February	Kenya	Shem Ngoche	Oman	Zeeshan Maqsood	United Ground, Windhoek	Oman by 5 wickets
Third-place playoff	15 February	Namibia	Sarel Burger	Canada	Nitish Kumar	Affies Park, Windhoek	Canada by 49 runs
Final	15 February	Nepal	Paras Khadka	United Arab Emirates	Rohan Mustafa	Wanderers Cricket Ground, Windhoek	United Arab Emirates by 7 runs

==== Final standings ====
Pos	Team	Status
1st	United Arab Emirates	Advanced to the 2018 Cricket World Cup Qualifier
2nd	Nepal	Advanced to the 2018 Cricket World Cup Qualifier
3rd	Canada	Remained in Division Two
4th	Namibia	Remained in Division Two
5th	Oman	Relegated to Division Three for 2018
6th	Kenya	Relegated to Division Three for 2018

=== England in New Zealand ===
ODI series
No.	Date	Home captain	Away captain	Venue	Result
ODI 3980	25 February	Kane Williamson	Eoin Morgan	Seddon Park, Hamilton	New Zealand by 3 wickets
ODI 3981	28 February	Tim Southee	Eoin Morgan	Bay Oval, Mount Maunganui	England by 6 wickets
ODI 3982	3 March	Kane Williamson	Eoin Morgan	Wellington Regional Stadium, Wellington	England by 4 runs
ODI 3989	7 March	Kane Williamson	Eoin Morgan	University Oval, Dunedin	New Zealand by 5 wickets
ODI 3992	10 March	Kane Williamson	Eoin Morgan	Hagley Oval, Christchurch	England by 7 wickets
Test series
No.	Date	Home captain	Away captain	Venue	Result
Test 2299	22–26 March	Kane Williamson	Joe Root	Eden Park, Auckland	New Zealand by an innings and 49 runs
Test 2301	30 March–3 April	Kane Williamson	Joe Root	Hagley Oval, Christchurch	Match drawn

== March ==
=== Australia in South Africa ===
Test series
No.	Date	Home captain	Away captain	Venue	Result
Test 2297	1–5 March	Faf du Plessis	Steve Smith	Kingsmead Cricket Ground, Durban	Australia by 118 runs
Test 2298	9–13 March	Faf du Plessis	Steve Smith	St George's Park, Port Elizabeth	South Africa by 6 wickets
Test 2300	22–26 March	Faf du Plessis	Steve Smith	Newlands Cricket Ground, Cape Town	South Africa by 322 runs
Test 2302	30 March–3 April	Faf du Plessis	Tim Paine	Wanderers Stadium, Johannesburg	South Africa by 492 runs

=== 2018 Cricket World Cup Qualifier ===
==== Group stage ====
Pos	Team	Pld	W	L	T	NR	Pts	NRR	Qualification
1	West Indies	4	4	0	0	0	8	1.171	Advanced to Super Sixes
2	Ireland	4	3	1	0	0	6	1.479	Advanced to Super Sixes
3	United Arab Emirates	4	2	2	0	0	4	−1.177	Advanced to Super Sixes
4	Netherlands	4	1	3	0	0	2	−0.709	Advanced to 7th–10th Play-offs
5	Papua New Guinea	4	0	4	0	0	0	−0.865	Advanced to 7th–10th Play-offs

Source: ESPNcricinfo

Pos	Team	Pld	W	L	T	NR	Pts	NRR	Qualification
1	Zimbabwe	4	3	0	1	0	7	1.035	Advanced to Super Sixes
2	Scotland	4	3	0	1	0	7	0.855	Advanced to Super Sixes
3	Afghanistan	4	1	3	0	0	2	0.038	Advanced to Super Sixes
4	Nepal	4	1	3	0	0	2	−0.893	Advanced to 7th–10th Play-offs
5	Hong Kong	4	1	3	0	0	2	−1.121	Advanced to 7th–10th Play-offs

Source: ESPNcricinfo

Group Stage
No.	Date	Group	Team 1	Captain 1	Team 2	Captain 2	Venue	Result
ODI 3983	4 March	B	Afghanistan	Rashid Khan	Scotland	Kyle Coetzer	Bulawayo Athletic Club, Bulawayo	Scotland by 7 wickets
ODI 3984	4 March	A	Papua New Guinea	Assad Vala	United Arab Emirates	Rohan Mustafa	Harare Sports Club, Harare	United Arab Emirates by 56 runs (DLS)
List A match	4 March	B	Zimbabwe	Graeme Cremer	Nepal	Paras Khadka	Queens Sports Club, Bulawayo	Zimbabwe by 116 runs
List A match	4 March	A	Ireland	William Porterfield	Netherlands	Peter Borren	Old Hararians, Harare	Ireland by 93 runs (DLS)
ODI 3985	6 March	B	Scotland	Kyle Coetzer	Hong Kong	Babar Hayat	Bulawayo Athletic Club, Bulawayo	Scotland by 4 wickets
ODI 3986	6 March	A	Papua New Guinea	Assad Vala	Ireland	William Porterfield	Harare Sports Club, Harare	Ireland by 4 wickets
ODI 3987	6 March	A	West Indies	Jason Holder	United Arab Emirates	Rohan Mustafa	Old Hararians, Harare	West Indies by 60 runs
ODI 3988	6 March	B	Zimbabwe	Graeme Cremer	Afghanistan	Rashid Khan	Queens Sports Club, Bulawayo	Zimbabwe by 2 runs
List A match	8 March	A	Netherlands	Peter Borren	United Arab Emirates	Rohan Mustafa	Harare Sports Club, Harare	United Arab Emirates by 6 wickets
List A match	8 March	B	Scotland	Kyle Coetzer	Nepal	Paras Khadka	Queens Sports Club, Bulawayo	Scotland by 4 wickets
ODI 3990	8 March	B	Afghanistan	Rashid Khan	Hong Kong	Babar Hayat	Bulawayo Athletic Club, Bulawayo	Hong Kong by 30 runs (DLS)
ODI 3991	8 March	A	West Indies	Jason Holder	Papua New Guinea	Assad Vala	Old Hararians, Harare	West Indies by 6 wickets
ODI 3993	10 March	A	West Indies	Jason Holder	Ireland	William Porterfield	Harare Sports Club, Harare	West Indies by 52 runs
ODI 3994	10 March	B	Zimbabwe	Graeme Cremer	Hong Kong	Babar Hayat	Queens Sports Club, Bulawayo	Zimbabwe by 89 runs
List A match	10 March	A	Papua New Guinea	Assad Vala	Netherlands	Peter Borren	Old Hararians, Harare	Netherlands by 57 runs
List A match	10 March	B	Afghanistan	Rashid Khan	Nepal	Paras Khadka	Bulawayo Athletic Club, Bulawayo	Afghanistan by 6 wickets
List A match	12 March	A	West Indies	Jason Holder	Netherlands	Peter Borren	Harare Sports Club, Harare	West Indies by 54 runs (DLS)
List A match	12 March	B	Hong Kong	Babar Hayat	Nepal	Paras Khadka	Bulawayo Athletic Club, Bulawayo	Nepal by 5 wickets
ODI 3995	12 March	A	Ireland	William Porterfield	United Arab Emirates	Rohan Mustafa	Old Hararians, Harare	Ireland by 226 runs (DLS)
ODI 3996	12 March	B	Zimbabwe	Graeme Cremer	Scotland	Kyle Coetzer	Queens Sports Club, Bulawayo	Match tied
Play-offs
List A match	15 March		Papua New Guinea	Assad Vala	Nepal	Paras Khadka	Old Hararians, Harare	Nepal by 6 wickets
List A match	15 March		Netherlands	Peter Borren	Hong Kong	Babar Hayat	Kwekwe Sports Club, Kwekwe	Netherlands by 44 runs
ODI 4000	17 March		Hong Kong	Babar Hayat	Papua New Guinea	Assad Vala	Old Hararians, Harare	Papua New Guinea by 58 runs
List A match	17 March		Nepal	Paras Khadka	Netherlands	Peter Borren	Kwekwe Sports Club, Kwekwe	Netherlands by 45 runs

==== Super Sixes ====
Pos	Team	Pld	W	L	T	NR	Pts	NRR	Qualification
1	West Indies	5	4	1	0	0	8	0.472	Advance to the Final and qualify for 2019 World Cup
2	Afghanistan	5	3	2	0	0	6	0.302	Advance to the Final and qualify for 2019 World Cup
3	Zimbabwe	5	2	2	1	0	5	0.420	
4	Scotland	5	2	2	1	0	5	0.243	
5	Ireland	5	2	3	0	0	4	0.346	
6	United Arab Emirates	5	1	4	0	0	2	−1.950	

Source: ICC

Super Sixes
No.	Date	Team 1	Captain 1	Team 2	Captain 2	Venue	Result
ODI 3997	15 March	West Indies	Jason Holder	Afghanistan	Rashid Khan	Harare Sports Club, Harare	Afghanistan by 3 wickets
ODI 3998	15 March	United Arab Emirates	Rohan Mustafa	Scotland	Kyle Coetzer	Queens Sports Club, Bulawayo	Scotland by 73 runs
ODI 3999	16 March	Ireland	William Porterfield	Zimbabwe	Graeme Cremer	Harare Sports Club, Harare	Zimbabwe by 107 runs
ODI 4001	18 March	Ireland	William Porterfield	Scotland	Kyle Coetzer	Harare Sports Club, Harare	Ireland by 25 runs
ODI 4002	19 March	West Indies	Jason Holder	Zimbabwe	Graeme Cremer	Harare Sports Club, Harare	West Indies by 4 wickets
ODI 4003	20 March	United Arab Emirates	Rohan Mustafa	Afghanistan	Asghar Stanikzai	Old Hararians, Harare	Afghanistan by 5 wickets
ODI 4004	21 March	West Indies	Jason Holder	Scotland	Kyle Coetzer	Harare Sports Club, Harare	West Indies by 5 runs (DLS)
ODI 4005	22 March	United Arab Emirates	Rohan Mustafa	Zimbabwe	Graeme Cremer	Harare Sports Club, Harare	United Arab Emirates by 3 runs (DLS)
ODI 4006	23 March	Ireland	William Porterfield	Afghanistan	Asghar Stanikzai	Harare Sports Club, Harare	Afghanistan by 5 wickets
Final
ODI 4007	25 March	West Indies	Jason Holder	Afghanistan	Asghar Stanikzai	Harare Sports Club, Harare	Afghanistan by 7 wickets

==== Final standings ====
Position	Team	Result
1st	Afghanistan	Qualified for the 2019 Cricket World Cup
2nd	West Indies	Qualified for the 2019 Cricket World Cup
3rd	Zimbabwe	
4th	Scotland	Retained ODI status until 2023
5th	Ireland	
6th	United Arab Emirates	Retained ODI status until 2023
7th	Netherlands	Gained ODI status until 2023
8th	Nepal	Gained ODI status until 2023
9th	Papua New Guinea	Relegated to Division Two and lost ODI status
10th	Hong Kong	Relegated to Division Two and lost ODI status

Note: Remaining teams already had ODI status until at least 2023.

=== West Indies women in New Zealand ===
2017–20 ICC Women's Championship – WODI series
No.	Date	Home captain	Away captain	Venue	Result
WODI 1098	4 March	Suzie Bates	Stafanie Taylor	Bert Sutcliffe Oval, Lincoln	New Zealand by 1 run
WODI 1099	8 March	Suzie Bates	Stafanie Taylor	Bert Sutcliffe Oval, Lincoln	New Zealand by 8 wickets
WODI 1100	11 March	Suzie Bates	Stafanie Taylor	Hagley Oval, Christchurch	New Zealand by 205 runs
WT20I series
No.	Date	Home captain	Away captain	Venue	Result
WT20I 399	14 March	Suzie Bates	Stafanie Taylor	Bay Oval, Mount Maunganui	New Zealand by 8 runs
WT20I 400	16 March	Suzie Bates	Stafanie Taylor	Bay Oval, Mount Maunganui	New Zealand by 106 runs
WT20I 401	20 March	Suzie Bates	Stafanie Taylor	Pukekura Park, New Plymouth	New Zealand by 1 run
WT20I 401a	22 March	Suzie Bates	Stafanie Taylor	Pukekura Park, New Plymouth	Match abandoned
WT20I 404	25 March	Suzie Bates	Stafanie Taylor	Seddon Park, Hamilton	New Zealand by 7 wickets

=== 2018 Nidahas Trophy ===
Pos	Team	Pld	W	L	T	NR	Pts	NRR
1	India	4	3	1	0	0	6	0.377
2	Bangladesh	4	2	2	0	0	4	−0.293
3	Sri Lanka	4	1	3	0	0	2	−0.085

Source: ESPNcricinfo

Tri-series
No.	Date	Team 1	Captain 1	Team 2	Captain 2	Venue	Result
T20I 656	6 March	Sri Lanka	Dinesh Chandimal	India	Rohit Sharma	R. Premadasa Stadium, Colombo	Sri Lanka by 5 wickets
T20I 657	8 March	Bangladesh	Mahmudullah	India	Rohit Sharma	R. Premadasa Stadium, Colombo	India by 6 wickets
T20I 658	10 March	Sri Lanka	Dinesh Chandimal	Bangladesh	Mahmudullah	R. Premadasa Stadium, Colombo	Bangladesh by 5 wickets
T20I 659	12 March	Sri Lanka	Thisara Perera	India	Rohit Sharma	R. Premadasa Stadium, Colombo	India by 6 wickets
T20I 660	14 March	Bangladesh	Mahmudullah	India	Rohit Sharma	R. Premadasa Stadium, Colombo	India by 17 runs
T20I 661	16 March	Sri Lanka	Thisara Perera	Bangladesh	Shakib Al Hasan	R. Premadasa Stadium, Colombo	Bangladesh by 2 wickets
Final
T20I 662	18 March	Bangladesh	Shakib Al Hasan	India	Rohit Sharma	R. Premadasa Stadium, Colombo	India by 4 wickets

=== Australia women in India ===
2017–20 ICC Women's Championship – WODI series
No.	Date	Home captain	Away captain	Venue	Result
WODI 1101	12 March	Harmanpreet Kaur	Meg Lanning	Reliance Stadium, Vadodara	Australia by 8 wickets
WODI 1102	15 March	Mithali Raj	Meg Lanning	Reliance Stadium, Vadodara	Australia by 60 runs
WODI 1103	18 March	Mithali Raj	Meg Lanning	Reliance Stadium, Vadodara	Australia by 97 runs

=== Pakistan women in Sri Lanka ===
2017–20 ICC Women's Championship – WODI series
No.	Date	Home captain	Away captain	Venue	Result
WODI 1104	20 March	Chamari Athapaththu	Bismah Maroof	Rangiri Dambulla International Stadium, Dambulla	Pakistan by 69 runs
WODI 1105	22 March	Chamari Athapaththu	Bismah Maroof	Rangiri Dambulla International Stadium, Dambulla	Pakistan by 94 runs
WODI 1106	24 March	Chamari Athapaththu	Bismah Maroof	Rangiri Dambulla International Stadium, Dambulla	Pakistan by 108 runs
WT20I series
No.	Date	Home captain	Away captain	Venue	Result
WT20I 408	28 March	Chamari Athapaththu	Bismah Maroof	Sinhalese Sports Club Ground, Colombo	Pakistan by 1 wicket
WT20I 410	30 March	Chamari Athapaththu	Bismah Maroof	Nondescripts Cricket Club Ground, Colombo	Sri Lanka by 7 wickets
WT20I 412	31 March	Chamari Athapaththu	Bismah Maroof	Sinhalese Sports Club Ground, Colombo	Pakistan by 38 runs

=== 2017–18 India women's Tri-Nation Series ===
Pos	Team	Pld	W	L	T	NR	Pts	NRR
1	Australia	4	3	1	0	0	6	1.323
2	England	4	2	2	0	0	4	−0.923
3	India	4	1	3	0	0	2	−0.399

Source: ESPNcricinfo

WT20I Tri-series
No.	Date	Team 1	Captain 1	Team 2	Captain 2	Venue	Result
WT20I 402	22 March	India	Harmanpreet Kaur	Australia	Meg Lanning	Brabourne Stadium, Mumbai	Australia by 6 wickets
WT20I 403	23 March	Australia	Rachael Haynes	England	Heather Knight	Brabourne Stadium, Mumbai	England by 8 wickets
WT20I 405	25 March	India	Harmanpreet Kaur	England	Heather Knight	Brabourne Stadium, Mumbai	England by 7 wickets
WT20I 406	26 March	India	Harmanpreet Kaur	Australia	Meg Lanning	Brabourne Stadium, Mumbai	Australia by 36 runs
WT20I 407	28 March	Australia	Meg Lanning	England	Heather Knight	Brabourne Stadium, Mumbai	Australia by 8 wickets
WT20I 409	29 March	India	Harmanpreet Kaur	England	Heather Knight	Brabourne Stadium, Mumbai	India by 8 wickets
Final
WT20I 411	31 March	Australia	Meg Lanning	England	Danielle Hazell	Brabourne Stadium, Mumbai	Australia by 57 runs

== April ==
=== West Indies in Pakistan ===
T20I series
No.	Date	Home captain	Away captain	Venue	Result
T20I 663	1 April	Sarfaraz Ahmed	Jason Mohammed	National Stadium, Karachi	Pakistan by 143 runs
T20I 664	2 April	Sarfaraz Ahmed	Jason Mohammed	National Stadium, Karachi	Pakistan by 82 runs
T20I 665	3 April	Sarfaraz Ahmed	Jason Mohammed	National Stadium, Karachi	Pakistan by 8 wickets

=== England women in India ===
WODI series
No.	Date	Home captain	Away captain	Venue	Result
WODI 1107	6 April	Mithali Raj	Anya Shrubsole	Vidarbha Cricket Association Stadium, Nagpur	India by 1 wicket
WODI 1108	9 April	Mithali Raj	Heather Knight	Vidarbha Cricket Association Stadium, Nagpur	England by 8 wickets
WODI 1109	12 April	Mithali Raj	Heather Knight	Vidarbha Cricket Association Stadium, Nagpur	India by 8 wickets
