= International cricket in 2014–15 =

International cricket season

The 2014–2015 international cricket season was from October 2014 to April 2015.

== Season overview ==
International tours
Start date	Home team	Away team	Results [Matches]		
Start date	Home team	Away team	Test	ODI	T20I
5 October 2014	Pakistan	Australia	2–0 [2]	0–3 [3]	0–1 [1]
8 October 2014	India	West Indies	—	2–1 [4]	—
21 October 2014	New Zealand	South Africa	—	0–2 [3]	—
25 October 2014	Bangladesh	Zimbabwe	3–0 [3]	5–0 [5]	—
2 November 2014	India	Sri Lanka	—	5–0 [5]	—
5 November 2014	Australia	South Africa	—	4–1 [5]	2–1 [3]
9 November 2014	Pakistan	New Zealand	1–1 [3]	2–3 [5]	1–1 [2]
26 November 2014	Sri Lanka	England	—	5–2 [7]	—
28 November 2014	UAE	Afghanistan	—	3–1 [4]	—
4 December 2014	Australia	India	2–0 [4]	—	—
17 December 2014	South Africa	West Indies	2–0 [3]	4–1 [5]	1–2 [3]
26 December 2014	New Zealand	Sri Lanka	2–0 [2]	4–2 [7]	—
31 January 2015	New Zealand	Pakistan	—	2–0 [2]	—
13 April 2015	West Indies	England	1–1 [3]	—	—
17 April 2015	Bangladesh	Pakistan	0–1 [2]	3–0 [3]	1–0 [1]
Neutral venue series
Start date	Series		Results [Matches]		
Start date	Series		FC	ODI/LA	T20I/T20
8 November 2014	(Australia) Hong Kong vs. PNG		0–1 [1]	0–2 [2]	—
19 November 2014	(Sri Lanka) Hong Kong vs. Nepal		—	0–0 [1]	1–0 [4]
International tournaments
Start date	Tournament			Winners	
4 January 2015	(United Arab Emirates) 2015 Dubai Triangular Series			Ireland	
16 January 2015	(Australia) 2015 Carlton Mid Triangular Series			Australia	
14 February 2015	(Australia) (New Zealand) 2015 Cricket World Cup			Australia	
Women's international tours
Start date	Home team	Away team	Results [Matches]		
Start date	Home team	Away team	Test	ODI	T20I
15 October 2014	Sri Lanka	South Africa	—	1–2 [4]	1–2 [3]
2 November 2014	Australia	West Indies	—	4–0 [4]	4–0 [4]
16 November 2014	India	South Africa	1–0 [1]	1–2 [3]	1–0 [1]
9 January 2015	Pakistan	Sri Lanka	—	3–0 [3]	1–2 [3]
11 February 2015	New Zealand	England	—	2–3 [5]	1–2 [3]
13 March 2015	Pakistan	South Africa	—	1–2 [3]	2–1 [3]
Minor tournaments
Start date	Tournament			Winners	
26 October 2014	(Malaysia) 2014 ICC World Cricket League Division Three			Nepal	
19 November 2014	(Australia) 2014 ICC East Asia-Pacific Men's Championship			PNG	
26 November 2014	(United States) 2014 ICC Americas Twenty20 Division Two			Suriname	
17 January 2015	(Namibia) 2015 ICC World Cricket League Division Two			Netherlands	
25 January 2015	(United Arab Emirates) 2015 ACC Twenty20 Cup			Oman	
27 March 2015	(South Africa) 2015 ICC Africa Twenty20 Championship			Namibia	
Youth minor tournaments
Start date	Tournament			Winners	
8 November 2014	(Kuwait) 2014 ACC Under-19 Premier League			Afghanistan	
14 February 2015	(Tanzania) 2015 ICC Africa Under-19 Championship			Namibia	
24 February 2015	(New Zealand) 2015 EAP Under-19 Cricket Trophy			Fiji	

== Rankings ==
The following were the rankings of cricketing nations at the beginning of the season.

ICC Test Championship 16 September 2014
Rank	Team	Matches	Points	Rating
1	South Africa	27	3353	124
2	Australia	32	3950	123
3	England	39	4063	104
4	Sri Lanka	31	3126	101
5	India	29	2793	96
6	Pakistan	23	2199	96
7	New Zealand	30	2787	93
8	West Indies	26	1962	75
9	Zimbabwe	9	352	39
10	Bangladesh	17	320	19

ICC ODI Championship 6 September 2014
Rank	Team	Matches	Points	Rating
1	India	59	6696	113
2	South Africa	43	4868	113
3	Sri Lanka	65	7245	111
4	Australia	40	4455	111
5	England	45	4804	107
6	Pakistan	50	4998	100
7	New Zealand	30	3031	98
8	West Indies	43	4107	96
9	Bangladesh	28	1940	69
10	Zimbabwe	31	1784	58
11	Afghanistan	13	550	42
12	Ireland	9	297	33

ICC T20I Championship 7 September 2014
Rank	Team	Matches	Points	Rating
1	Sri Lanka	23	3006	131
2	India	16	2009	126
3	Pakistan	26	3194	123
4	South Africa	23	2785	121
5	Australia	22	2454	112
6	New Zealand	20	2414	110
7	West Indies	25	2742	110
8	England	25	2481	99
9	Ireland	12	1046	87
10	Bangladesh	16	1147	72
11	Netherlands	14	951	68
12	Afghanistan	12	743	62
13	Zimbabwe	11	573	52
14	Scotland	10	512	51
Insufficient matches
	Nepal	3	190	63
	Hong Kong	3	90	30
	UAE	3	0	0

== October ==
=== Australia vs Pakistan in the United Arab Emirates ===
T20I series
No.	Date	Home captain	Away captain	Venue	Result
T20I 406	5 October	Shahid Afridi	Aaron Finch	Dubai International Cricket Stadium, Dubai	Australia by 6 wickets
ODI series
No.	Date	Home captain	Away captain	Venue	Result
ODI 3530	7 October	Misbah-ul-Haq	George Bailey	Sharjah Cricket Stadium, Sharjah	Australia by 93 runs
ODI 3532	10 October	Misbah-ul-Haq	George Bailey	Dubai International Cricket Stadium, Dubai	Australia by 5 wickets
ODI 3534	12 October	Shahid Afridi	George Bailey	Sheikh Zayed Stadium, Abu Dhabi	Australia by 1 run
Test series
No.	Date	Home captain	Away captain	Venue	Result
Test 2140	22–26 October	Misbah-ul-Haq	Michael Clarke	Dubai International Cricket Stadium, Dubai	Pakistan by 221 runs
Test 2142	30 October–3 November	Misbah-ul-Haq	Michael Clarke	Sheikh Zayed Stadium, Abu Dhabi	Pakistan by 356 runs

=== West Indies in India ===
ODI series
No.	Date	Home captain	Away captain	Venue	Result
ODI 3531	8 October	Mahendra Singh Dhoni	Dwayne Bravo	Nehru Stadium, Kochi	West Indies by 124 runs
ODI 3533	11 October	Mahendra Singh Dhoni	Dwayne Bravo	Feroz Shah Kotla, Delhi	India by 48 runs
ODI 3534a	14 October	Mahendra Singh Dhoni	Dwayne Bravo	Dr. Y.S. Rajasekhara Reddy ACA-VDCA Cricket Stadium, Visakhapatnam	Match abandoned
ODI 3535	17 October	Mahendra Singh Dhoni	Dwayne Bravo	Himachal Pradesh Cricket Association Stadium, Dharamshala	India by 59 runs

The tour was cancelled after the 4th ODI at Dharamshala. The West Indies tour of India in October was originally scheduled to consist of three Test matches, five One Day International matches and one Twenty20 International match. During the 4th ODI, the rest of the tour was cancelled due to a pay dispute between the West Indies players, the West Indies Cricket Board and the players association.

=== South Africa women in Sri Lanka ===
WODI series
No.	Date	Home captain	Away captain	Venue	Result
WODI 923	15 October	Chamari Atapattu	Mignon du Preez	Sinhalese Sports Club Ground, Colombo	South Africa by 53 runs
WODI 924	17 October	Chamari Atapattu	Mignon du Preez	Sinhalese Sports Club Ground, Colombo	No result
WODI 925	19 October	Chamari Atapattu	Mignon du Preez	Sinhalese Sports Club Ground, Colombo	Sri Lanka by 4 wickets
WODI 926	21 October	Chamari Atapattu	Mignon du Preez	Sinhalese Sports Club Ground, Colombo	South Africa by 5 wickets
WT20I series
No.	Date	Home captain	Away captain	Venue	Result
WT20I 287	23 October	Chamari Atapattu	Mignon du Preez	Colts Cricket Club Ground, Colombo	Sri Lanka by 7 runs
WT20I 288	25 October	Chamari Atapattu	Mignon du Preez	Colts Cricket Club Ground, Colombo	South Africa by 7 wickets
WT20I 289	26 October	Chamari Atapattu	Mignon du Preez	Mercantile Cricket Association Ground, Colombo	South Africa by 9 wickets

=== South Africa in New Zealand ===
ODI series
No.	Date	Home captain	Away captain	Venue	Result
ODI 3536	21 October	Brendon McCullum	AB de Villiers	Bay Oval, Mount Maunganui	South Africa by 6 wickets
ODI 3537	24 October	Brendon McCullum	AB de Villiers	Bay Oval, Mount Maunganui	South Africa by 72 runs
ODI 3538	27 October	Brendon McCullum	AB de Villiers	Seddon Park, Hamilton	No result

=== Zimbabwe in Bangladesh ===
Test series
No.	Date	Home captain	Away captain	Venue	Result
Test 2141	25–29 October	Mushfiqur Rahim	Brendan Taylor	Sher-e-Bangla National Cricket Stadium, Dhaka	Bangladesh by 3 wickets
Test 2143	3–7 November	Mushfiqur Rahim	Brendan Taylor	Sheikh Abu Naser Stadium, Khulna	Bangladesh by 162 runs
Test 2145	12–16 November	Mushfiqur Rahim	Brendan Taylor	Zohur Ahmed Chowdhury Stadium, Chittagong	Bangladesh by 186 runs
ODI series
No.	Date	Home captain	Away captain	Venue	Result
ODI 3550	21 November	Mashrafe Mortaza	Elton Chigumbura	Zohur Ahmed Chowdhury Stadium, Chittagong	Bangladesh by 87 runs
ODI 3552	23 November	Mashrafe Mortaza	Elton Chigumbura	Zohur Ahmed Chowdhury Stadium, Chittagong	Bangladesh by 68 runs
ODI 3553	26 November	Mashrafe Mortaza	Elton Chigumbura	Sher-e-Bangla National Cricket Stadium, Dhaka	Bangladesh by 124 runs
ODI 3555	28 November	Mashrafe Mortaza	Elton Chigumbura	Sher-e-Bangla National Cricket Stadium, Dhaka	Bangladesh by 21 runs
ODI 3559	1 December	Mashrafe Mortaza	Elton Chigumbura	Sher-e-Bangla National Cricket Stadium, Dhaka	Bangladesh by 5 wickets

=== 2014 ICC World Cricket League Division Three ===
==== Points table ====
Pos	Team	Pld	W	L	T	NR	Pts	NRR
1	Nepal	5	4	1	0	0	8	1.985
2	Uganda	5	4	1	0	0	8	0.152
3	Singapore	5	3	2	0	0	6	−0.351
4	Malaysia	5	2	3	0	0	4	0.204
5	United States	5	1	4	0	0	2	0.165
6	Bermuda	5	1	4	0	0	2	−2.134

Group stage
No.	Date	Team 1	Captain 1	Team 2	Captain 2	Venue	Result
Match 1	23 October	Nepal	Paras Khadka	Uganda	Frank Nsubuga	Kinrara Academy Oval, Kuala Lumpur	Uganda by 20 runs
Match 2	23 October	USA	Steve Massiah	Bermuda	Janeiro Tucker	Bayuemas Oval, Kuala Lumpur	USA by 6 wickets
Match 3	23 October	Malaysia	Ahmed Faiz	Singapore	Saad Janjua	Selangor Turf Club, Selangor	Singapore by 2 wickets
Match 4	24 October	Singapore	Saad Janjua	Uganda	Frank Nsubuga	Kinrara Academy Oval, Kuala Lumpur	Uganda by 1 run
Match 5	24 October	Malaysia	Ahmed Faiz	USA	Steve Massiah	Selangor Turf Club, Selangor	Malaysia by 5 wickets
Match 6	24 October	Nepal	Paras Khadka	Bermuda	Janeiro Tucker	Bayuemas Oval, Kuala Lumpur	Nepal by 8 wickets
Match 7	26 October	Malaysia	Ahmed Faiz	Bermuda	Janeiro Tucker	Kinrara Academy Oval, Kuala Lumpur	Bermuda by 37 runs (D/L)
Match 8	26 October	Singapore	Saad Janjua	Nepal	Paras Khadka	Selangor Turf Club, Selangor	Nepal by 190 runs
Match 9	26 October	USA	Steve Massiah	Uganda	Frank Nsubuga	Bayuemas Oval, Kuala Lumpur	Uganda 24 runs (D/L)
Match 10	27 October	Malaysia	Ahmed Faiz	Uganda	Frank Nsubuga	Bayuemas Oval, Kuala Lumpur	Malaysia by 4 wickets
Match 11	27 October	Nepal	Paras Khadka	USA	Steve Massiah	Kinrara Academy Oval, Kuala Lumpur	No result
Match 12	27 October	Singapore	Saad Janjua	Bermuda	Janeiro Tucker	Selangor Turf Club, Selangor	No result
Match 11 (Rescheduled)	28 October	Nepal	Paras Khadka	USA	Steve Massiah	Kinrara Academy Oval, Kuala Lumpur	Nepal by 10 runs (D/L)
Match 12 (Rescheduled)	28 October	Singapore	Saad Janjua	Bermuda	Janeiro Tucker	Selangor Turf Club, Selangor	Singapore by 3 wickets
Match 13	29 October	Singapore	Saad Janjua	USA	Steve Massiah	Kinrara Academy Oval, Kuala Lumpur	Singapore by 32 runs (D/L)
Match 14	29 October	Uganda	Frank Nsubuga	Bermuda	Janeiro Tucker	Bayuemas Oval, Kuala Lumpur	Uganda by 7 wickets
Match 15	29 October	Malaysia	Ahmed Faiz	Nepal	Paras Khadka	Selangor Turf Club, Selangor	Nepal by 25 runs (D/L)
Playoffs
No.	Date	Team 1	Captain 1	Team 2	Captain 2	Venue	Result
5th place playoff	30 October	USA	Steve Massiah	Bermuda	Janeiro Tucker	Selangor Turf Club, Selangor	USA by 10 wickets
3rd place playoff	30 October	Malaysia	Ahmed Faiz	Singapore	Saad Janjua	Bayuemas Oval, Kuala Lumpur	Malaysia by 7 wickets
Final	30 October	Nepal	Paras Khadka	Uganda	Frank Nsubuga	Kinrara Academy Oval, Kuala Lumpur	Nepal by 62 runs

===== Final Placings =====
Pos	Team	Status
1st	Nepal	Promoted to 2015 Division Two
2nd	Uganda	Promoted to 2015 Division Two
3rd	Malaysia	Remain in 2016 Division Three
4th	Singapore	Remain in 2016 Division Three
5th	USA	Relegated to 2016 Division Four
6th	Bermuda	Relegated to 2016 Division Four

== November ==
=== Sri Lanka in India ===
ODI series
No.	Date	Home captain	Away captain	Venue	Result
ODI 3539	2 November	Virat Kohli	Angelo Mathews	Barabati Stadium, Cuttack	India by 169 runs
ODI 3540	6 November	Virat Kohli	Angelo Mathews	Sardar Patel Stadium, Ahmedabad	India by 6 wickets
ODI 3543	9 November	Virat Kohli	Angelo Mathews	Rajiv Gandhi International Stadium, Hyderabad	India by 6 wickets
ODI 3544	13 November	Virat Kohli	Angelo Mathews	Eden Gardens, Kolkata	India by 153 runs
ODI 3547	16 November	Virat Kohli	Angelo Mathews	JSCA International Cricket Stadium, Ranchi	India by 3 wickets

=== West Indies women in Australia ===
WT20I series
No.	Date	Home captain	Away captain	Venue	Result
WT20I 290	2 November	Meg Lanning	Merissa Aguilleira	North Sydney Oval, Sydney	Australia by 4 wickets
WT20I 291	5 November	Meg Lanning	Merissa Aguilleira	Adelaide Oval, Adelaide	Australia by 86 runs
WT20I 292	7 November	Meg Lanning	Merissa Aguilleira	Melbourne Cricket Ground, Melbourne	Australia by 4 wickets
WT20I 293	9 November	Meg Lanning	Merissa Aguilleira	Stadium Australia, Sydney	Australia by 8 wickets
WODI series
No.	Date	Home captain	Away captain	Venue	Result
WODI 927	11 November	Meg Lanning	Merissa Aguilleira	Hurstville Oval, Sydney	Australia by 3 wickets
WODI 928	13 November	Meg Lanning	Merissa Aguilleira	Hurstville Oval, Sydney	Australia by 53 runs
WODI 929	16 November	Meg Lanning	Merissa Aguilleira	Bradman Oval, Bowral	Australia by 8 wickets
WODI 930	18 November	Meg Lanning	Merissa Aguilleira	Bradman Oval, Bowral	Australia by 148 runs

=== South Africa in Australia ===
T20I series
No.	Date	Home captain	Away captain	Venue	Result
T20I 407	5 November	Aaron Finch	JP Duminy	Adelaide Oval, Adelaide	South Africa by 7 wickets
T20I 408	7 November	Aaron Finch	JP Duminy	Melbourne Cricket Ground, Melbourne	Australia by 7 wickets
T20I 409	9 November	Aaron Finch	JP Duminy	Stadium Australia, Sydney	Australia by 2 wickets
ODI series
No.	Date	Home captain	Away captain	Venue	Result
ODI 3545	14 November	Michael Clarke	AB de Villiers	WACA Ground, Perth	Australia by 32 runs
ODI 3546	16 November	George Bailey	AB de Villiers	WACA Ground, Perth	South Africa by 3 wickets
ODI 3548	19 November	George Bailey	AB de Villiers	Manuka Oval, Canberra	Australia by 73 runs
ODI 3549	21 November	George Bailey	AB de Villiers	Melbourne Cricket Ground, Melbourne	Australia by 3 wickets
ODI 3551	23 November	George Bailey	Hashim Amla	Sydney Cricket Ground, Sydney	Australia by 2 wickets (DLS)

=== Hong Kong vs PNG in Australia ===
ODI series
No.	Date	Team 1 captain	Team 2 captain	Venue	Result
ODI 3541	8 November	Jamie Atkinson	Chris Amini	Tony Ireland Stadium, Townsville	PNG by 4 wickets
ODI 3542	9 November	Jamie Atkinson	Chris Amini	Tony Ireland Stadium, Townsville	PNG by 3 wickets
FC series
No.	Date	Team 1 captain	Team 2 captain	Venue	Result
Only Match	11–13 November	Jamie Atkinson	Chris Amini	Tony Ireland Stadium, Townsville	PNG by 133 runs

=== New Zealand vs Pakistan in the United Arab Emirates ===
Test series
No.	Date	Home captain	Away captain	Venue	Result
Test 2144	9–13 November	Misbah-ul-Haq	Brendon McCullum	Sheikh Zayed Stadium, Abu Dhabi	Pakistan by 248 runs
Test 2146	17–21 November	Misbah-ul-Haq	Brendon McCullum	Dubai International Cricket Stadium, Dubai	Match drawn
Test 2147	26 November - 1 December	Misbah-ul-Haq	Brendon McCullum	Sharjah Cricket Stadium, Sharjah	New Zealand by an innings and 80 runs
T20I series
No.	Date	Home captain	Away captain	Venue	Result
T20I 411	4 December	Shahid Afridi	Kane Williamson	Dubai International Cricket Stadium, Dubai	Pakistan by 7 wickets
T20I 412	5 December	Shahid Afridi	Kane Williamson	Dubai International Cricket Stadium, Dubai	New Zealand by 17 runs
ODI series
No.	Date	Home captain	Away captain	Venue	Result
ODI 3564	8 December	Misbah-ul-Haq	Kane Williamson	Dubai International Cricket Stadium, Dubai	Pakistan by 3 wickets
ODI 3566	12 December	Misbah-ul-Haq	Kane Williamson	Sharjah Cricket Stadium, Sharjah	New Zealand by 4 wickets
ODI 3568	14 December	Shahid Afridi	Kane Williamson	Sharjah Cricket Stadium, Sharjah	Pakistan by 147 runs
ODI 3570	17 December	Shahid Afridi	Kane Williamson	Sheikh Zayed Stadium, Abu Dhabi	New Zealand by 7 runs
ODI 3571	19 December	Shahid Afridi	Kane Williamson	Sheikh Zayed Stadium, Abu Dhabi	New Zealand by 68 runs

=== South Africa women in India ===
WTEST series
No.	Date	Home captain	Away captain	Venue	Result
WTEST 137	16–19 November	Mithali Raj	Mignon du Preez	Gangothri Glades Cricket Ground, Mysore	India by an innings and 34 runs
WODI series
No.	Date	Home captain	Away captain	Venue	Result
WODI 931	24 November	Mithali Raj	Mignon du Preez	M. Chinnaswamy Stadium, Bangalore	South Africa by 2 wickets
WODI 932	26 November	Mithali Raj	Mignon du Preez	M. Chinnaswamy Stadium, Bangalore	India by 6 wickets
WODI 933	28 November	Mithali Raj	Mignon du Preez	M. Chinnaswamy Stadium, Bangalore	South Africa by 4 wickets
WT20I series
No.	Date	Home captain	Away captain	Venue	Result
WT20I 294	30 November	Mithali Raj	Mignon du Preez	M. Chinnaswamy Stadium, Bangalore	India by 16 runs

=== Hong Kong vs Nepal in Sri Lanka ===
T20I series
No.	Date	Team 1 captain	Team 2 captain	Venue	Result
T20I 409a	19 November	Jamie Atkinson	Paras Khadka	Rangiri Dambulla International Stadium, Dambulla	Match abandoned
T20I 409b	20 November	Jamie Atkinson	Paras Khadka	Rangiri Dambulla International Stadium, Dambulla	Match abandoned
T20I 409c	21 November	Jamie Atkinson	Paras Khadka	Rangiri Dambulla International Stadium, Dambulla	Match abandoned
T20I 409d	22 November	Jamie Atkinson	Paras Khadka	Rangiri Dambulla International Stadium, Dambulla	Cancelled
LA series
No.	Date	Team 1 captain	Team 2 captain	Venue	Result
Only List A	23 November	Jamie Atkinson	Paras Khadka	Colombo	Match abandoned
T20I series (rescheduled)
No.	Date	Team 1 captain	Team 2 captain	Venue	Result
T20I 410	24 November	Jamie Atkinson	Paras Khadka	Paikiasothy Saravanamuttu Stadium, Colombo	Hong Kong by 2 wickets

=== England in Sri Lanka ===
ODI series
No.	Date	Home captain	Away captain	Venue	Result
ODI 3554	26 November	Angelo Mathews	Alastair Cook	R. Premadasa Stadium, Colombo	Sri Lanka by 25 runs
ODI 3557	29 November	Angelo Mathews	Alastair Cook	R. Premadasa Stadium, Colombo	Sri Lanka by 8 wickets
ODI 3561	3 December	Angelo Mathews	Alastair Cook	Mahinda Rajapaksa International Cricket Stadium, Hambantota	England by 5 wickets
ODI 3563	7 December	Angelo Mathews	Eoin Morgan	R. Premadasa Stadium, Colombo	Sri Lanka by 6 wickets
ODI 3565	10 December	Angelo Mathews	Alastair Cook	Pallekele International Cricket Stadium, Pallekele	England by 5 wickets
ODI 3567	13 December	Angelo Mathews	Alastair Cook	Pallekele International Cricket Stadium, Pallekele	Sri Lanka by 90 runs
ODI 3569	16 December	Angelo Mathews	Alastair Cook	R. Premadasa Stadium, Colombo	Sri Lanka by 87 runs

=== 2014 ICC East Asia-Pacific Men's Championship ===
Pos	Team	Pld	W	L	T	NR	Pts	NRR
1	Papua New Guinea	7	7	0	0	0	14	6.141
2	Vanuatu	7	6	1	0	0	12	2.643
3	Fiji	7	5	2	0	0	10	2.824
4	Samoa	7	4	3	0	0	8	−0.357
5	Philippines	7	3	4	0	0	6	−1.734
6	Japan	7	2	5	0	0	4	−1.665
7	Indonesia	7	1	6	0	0	2	−4.624
8	Cook Islands	7	0	7	0	0	0	−3.521

Source: cricHQ

=== Afghanistan in the United Arab Emirates ===
ODI series
No.	Date	Home captain	Away captain	Venue	Result
ODI 3556	28 November	Khurram Khan	Mohammad Nabi	ICC Global Cricket Academy, Dubai	UAE by 5 wickets
ODI 3558	30 November	Khurram Khan	Mohammad Nabi	ICC Global Cricket Academy, Dubai	UAE by 6 wickets
ODI 3560	2 December	Khurram Khan	Mohammad Nabi	ICC Global Cricket Academy, Dubai	Afghanistan by 2 wickets
ODI 3562	4 December	Ahmed Raza	Mohammad Nabi	ICC Global Cricket Academy, Dubai	UAE by 30 runs

== December ==
=== India in Australia ===
Test series
No.	Date	Home captain	Away captain	Venue	Result
Test 2148	9–13 December	Michael Clarke	Virat Kohli	Adelaide Oval, Adelaide	Australia by 48 runs
Test 2149	17–21 December^{[nb1]}	Steve Smith	MS Dhoni	The Gabba, Brisbane	Australia by 4 wickets
Test 2152	26–30 December	Steve Smith	MS Dhoni	Melbourne Cricket Ground, Melbourne	Match drawn
Test 2156	6–10 January	Steve Smith	Virat Kohli	Sydney Cricket Ground, Sydney	Match drawn

^{nb1} Originally scheduled for 4–8 December. Postponed following the death of Australian cricketer Phillip Hughes.

=== West Indies in South Africa ===
Test series
No.	Date	Home captain	Away captain	Venue	Result
Test 2150	17–21 December	Hashim Amla	Denesh Ramdin	SuperSport Park, Centurion	South Africa by an innings and 220 runs
Test 2153	26–30 December	Hashim Amla	Denesh Ramdin	St George's Park, Port Elizabeth	Match drawn
Test 2154	2–6 January	Hashim Amla	Denesh Ramdin	Newlands, Cape Town	South Africa by 8 wickets
T20I series
No.	Date	Home captain	Away captain	Venue	Result
T20I 413	9 January	Faf du Plessis	Darren Sammy	Newlands, Cape Town	West Indies by 4 wickets
T20I 414	11 January	Faf du Plessis	Darren Sammy	New Wanderers Stadium, Johannesburg	West Indies by 4 wickets
T20I 415	14 January	Justin Ontong	Darren Sammy	Kingsmead, Durban	South Africa by 69 runs
ODI series
No.	Date	Home captain	Away captain	Venue	Result
ODI 3579	16 January	AB de Villiers	Jason Holder	Kingsmead, Durban	South Africa by 61 runs (DLS)
ODI 3583	18 January	AB de Villiers	Jason Holder	New Wanderers Stadium, Johannesburg	South Africa by 148 runs
ODI 3587	21 January	AB de Villiers	Jason Holder	Buffalo Park, East London	South Africa by 9 wickets
ODI 3591	25 January	AB de Villiers	Jason Holder	St George's Park, Port Elizabeth	West Indies by 1 wicket
ODI 3593	28 January	AB de Villiers	Jason Holder	SuperSport Park, Centurion	South Africa by 131 runs

=== Sri Lanka in New Zealand ===
Test series
No.	Date	Home captain	Away captain	Venue	Result
Test 2151	26–30 December	Brendon McCullum	Angelo Mathews	Hagley Oval, Christchurch	New Zealand by 8 wickets
Test 2155	3–7 January	Brendon McCullum	Angelo Mathews	Basin Reserve, Wellington	New Zealand by 193 runs
ODI series
No.	Date	Home captain	Away captain	Venue	Result
ODI 3574	11 January	Brendon McCullum	Angelo Mathews	Hagley Oval, Christchurch	New Zealand by 3 wickets
ODI 3577	15 January	Brendon McCullum	Angelo Mathews	Seddon Park, Hamilton	Sri Lanka by 6 wickets
ODI 3580	17 January	Brendon McCullum	Angelo Mathews	Eden Park, Auckland	No result
ODI 3585	20 January	Brendon McCullum	Angelo Mathews	Saxton Oval, Nelson	New Zealand by 4 wickets
ODI 3588	23 January	Brendon McCullum	Lahiru Thirimanne	University Oval, Dunedin	New Zealand by 108 runs
ODI 3590	25 January	Brendon McCullum	Lahiru Thirimanne	University Oval, Dunedin	New Zealand by 120 runs
ODI 3594	29 January	Kane Williamson	Lahiru Thirimanne	Westpac Stadium, Wellington	Sri Lanka by 34 runs

== January ==
=== 2014–15 Dubai Triangular Series ===
Pos	Team	Pld	W	L	T	NR	BP	Pts	NRR
1	Ireland	4	2	1	0	1	0	5	-0.161
2	Afghanistan	4	2	2	0	0	0	4	-0.402
3	Scotland	4	1	2	0	1	0	3	+0.705

No.	Date	Team 1	Captain 1	Team 2	Captain 2	Venue	Result
ODI 3572	8 January	Afghanistan	Mohammad Nabi	Scotland	Preston Mommsen	ICC Global Cricket Academy, Dubai	Afghanistan by 8 wickets
ODI 3573	10 January	Afghanistan	Mohammad Nabi	Ireland	William Porterfield	Dubai International Cricket Stadium, Dubai	Ireland by 3 wickets
ODI 3575	12 January	Ireland	William Porterfield	Scotland	Preston Mommsen	Dubai International Cricket Stadium, Dubai	Ireland by 3 wickets
ODI 3576	14 January	Afghanistan	Mohammad Nabi	Scotland	Preston Mommsen	Sheikh Zayed Stadium, Abu Dhabi	Scotland by 150 runs
ODI 3581	17 January	Afghanistan	Mohammad Nabi	Ireland	William Porterfield	Dubai International Cricket Stadium, Dubai	Afghanistan by 71 runs
ODI 3584	19 January	Ireland	William Porterfield	Scotland	Preston Mommsen	ICC Global Cricket Academy, Dubai	No result

=== Sri Lanka women vs Pakistan women in UAE ===
WODI series
No.	Date	Home captain	Away captain	Venue	Result
WODI 934	9 January	Sana Mir	Chamari Atapattu	Sharjah Cricket Stadium, Sharjah	Pakistan by 5 wickets
WODI 935	11 January	Sana Mir	Chamari Atapattu	Sharjah Cricket Stadium, Sharjah	Pakistan by 12 runs
WODI 936	13 January	Sana Mir	Chamari Atapattu	Sharjah Cricket Stadium, Sharjah	Pakistan by 7 wickets
WT20I series
No.	Date	Home captain	Away captain	Venue	Result
WT20I 295	15 January	Sana Mir	Chamari Atapattu	Sharjah Cricket Stadium, Sharjah	Sri Lanka by 8 runs
WT20I 296	16 January	Sana Mir	Chamari Atapattu	Sharjah Cricket Stadium, Sharjah	Pakistan by 55 runs
WT20I 297	17 January	Sana Mir	Chamari Atapattu	Sharjah Cricket Stadium, Sharjah	Sri Lanka by 5 wickets

=== 2014–15 Carlton Mid Triangular Series ===
Pos	Team	Pld	W	L	T	NR	BP	Pts	NRR
1	Australia	4	3	0	0	1	1	15	+0.467
2	England	4	2	2	0	0	1	9	+0.425
3	India	4	0	3	0	1	0	2	−0.942

Group stage
No.	Date	Team 1	Captain 1	Team 2	Captain 2	Venue	Result
ODI 3578	16 January	Australia	George Bailey	England	Eoin Morgan	Sydney Cricket Ground, Sydney	Australia by 3 wickets
ODI 3582	18 January	Australia	George Bailey	India	Mahendra Singh Dhoni	Melbourne Cricket Ground, Melbourne	Australia by 4 wickets
ODI 3586	20 January	England	Eoin Morgan	India	Mahendra Singh Dhoni	The Gabba, Brisbane	England by 9 wickets
ODI 3589	23 January	Australia	Steve Smith	England	Eoin Morgan	Bellerive Oval, Hobart	Australia by 3 wickets
ODI 3592	26 January	Australia	George Bailey	India	Mahendra Singh Dhoni	Sydney Cricket Ground, Sydney	No result
ODI 3595	30 January	England	Eoin Morgan	India	Mahendra Singh Dhoni	WACA Ground, Perth	England by 3 wickets
Final
ODI 3597	1 February	Australia	George Bailey	England	Eoin Morgan	WACA Ground, Perth	Australia by 112 runs

=== 2015 ICC World Cricket League Division Two ===
==== Points table ====
Pos	Team	Pld	W	L	T	NR	Pts	NRR
1	Namibia	5	4	1	0	0	8	1.025
2	Netherlands	5	3	2	0	0	6	0.642
3	Nepal	5	3	2	0	0	6	0.388
4	Kenya	5	2	3	0	0	4	−0.197
5	Canada	5	2	3	0	0	4	−0.317
6	Uganda	5	1	4	0	0	2	−1.599

Group stage
No.	Date	Team 1	Captain 1	Team 2	Captain 2	Venue	Result
Match 1	17 January	Namibia	Nicolaas Scholtz	Kenya	Rakep Patel	Wanderers Cricket Ground, Windhoek	Namibia by 5 wickets
Match 2	17 January	Nepal	Paras Khadka	Uganda	Frank Nsubuga	Wanderers Affies Park, Windhoek	Uganda by 2 runs
Match 3	17 January	Canada	Amarbir Hansra	Netherlands	Peter Borren	United Cricket Club Ground, Windhoek	Netherlands by 67 runs
Match 4	18 January	Namibia	Nicolaas Scholtz	Uganda	Frank Nsubuga	Wanderers Cricket Ground, Windhoek	Namibia by 4 wickets
Match 5	18 January	Canada	Amarbir Hansra	Kenya	Rakep Patel	Wanderers Affies Park, Windhoek	Canada by 46 runs
Match 6	18 January	Netherlands	Peter Borren	Nepal	Paras Khadka	United Cricket Club Ground, Windhoek	Nepal by 2 wickets
Match 7	20 January	Canada	Amarbir Hansra	Nepal	Paras Khadka	Wanderers Cricket Ground, Windhoek	Nepal by 7 wickets
Match 8	20 January	Namibia	Nicolaas Scholtz	Netherlands	Peter Borren	Wanderers Affies Park, Windhoek	Namibia by 188 runs
Match 9	20 January	Kenya	Rakep Patel	Uganda	Frank Nsubuga	United Cricket Club Ground, Windhoek	Kenya by 5 wickets
Match 10	21 January	Kenya	Rakep Patel	Netherlands	Peter Borren	Wanderers Cricket Ground, Windhoek	Netherlands by 5 wickets
Match 11	21 January	Canada	Amarbir Hansra	Uganda	Frank Nsubuga	Wanderers Affies Park, Windhoek	Canada by 111 runs
Match 12	21 January	Namibia	Nicolaas Scholtz	Nepal	Paras Khadka	United Cricket Club Ground, Windhoek	Nepal by 3 wickets
Match 13	23 January	Netherlands	Peter Borren	Uganda	Frank Nsubuga	Wanderers Cricket Ground, Windhoek	Netherlands by 7 wickets
Match 14	23 January	Kenya	Rakep Patel	Nepal	Paras Khadka	Wanderers Affies Park, Windhoek	Kenya by 5 wickets
Match 15	23 January	Namibia	Nicolaas Scholtz	Canada	Amarbir Hansra	United Cricket Club Ground, Windhoek	Namibia by 8 wickets
Playoffs
No.	Date	Team 1	Captain 1	Team 2	Captain 2	Venue	Result
5th place Play-off	24 January	Canada	Amarbir Hansra	Uganda	Frank Nsubuga	United Cricket Club Ground, Windhoek	Uganda by 8 wickets
3rd Place play-off	24 January	Nepal	Paras Khadka	Kenya	Rakep Patel	Wanderers Affies Park, Windhoek	Kenya by 15 runs
Final	24 January	Namibia	Nicolaas Scholtz	Netherlands	Peter Borren	Wanderers Cricket Ground, Windhoek	Netherlands by 8 wickets

===== Final placings =====
Pos	Team	Status
1st	Netherlands	Promoted to 2015-17 ICC World Cricket League Championship & 2015-17 ICC Intercontinental Cup
2nd	Namibia	Promoted to 2015-17 ICC World Cricket League Championship & 2015-17 ICC Intercontinental Cup
3rd	Kenya	Qualified for 2015-17 ICC World Cricket League Championship
4th	Nepal	Qualified for 2015-17 ICC World Cricket League Championship
5th	Uganda	Relegated to 2017 Division Three
6th	Canada	Relegated to 2017 Division Three

=== 2015 ACC Twenty20 Cup ===
==== Points table ====
Pos	Team	Pld	W	L	T	NR	Pts	NRR
1	Oman	5	4	1	0	0	8	1.815
2	Kuwait	5	4	1	0	0	8	1.125
3	Saudi Arabia	5	3	2	0	0	6	0.163
4	Singapore	5	2	3	0	0	4	0.550
5	Malaysia	5	2	3	0	0	4	−0.183
6	Maldives	5	0	5	0	0	0	−3.288

Round Robin Matches
No.	Date	Team 1	Captain 1	Team 2	Captain 2	Venue	Result
Match 1	25 January	Malaysia	Ahmed Faiz	Maldives	Afzal Faiz	Al Dhaid Cricket Village, Al Dhaid	Malaysia by 56 runs
Match 2	25 January	Oman	Sultan Ahmed	Saudi Arabia	Shoaib Ali	Sharjah Cricket Stadium, Sharjah	Oman by 51 runs
Match 3	25 January	Kuwait	Aamir Javed	Singapore	Chetan Suryawanshi	Sharjah Cricket Stadium, Sharjah	Kuwait by 10 runs
Match 4	26 January	Kuwait	Aamir Javed	Saudi Arabia	Shoaib Ali	Al Dhaid Cricket Village, Al Dhaid	Kuwait by 3 runs
Match 5	26 January	Maldives	Afzal Faiz	Singapore	Chetan Suryawanshi	Sharjah Cricket Stadium, Sharjah	Singapore by 68 runs
Match 6	26 January	Malaysia	Ahmed Faiz	Oman	Sultan Ahmed	Sharjah Cricket Stadium, Sharjah	Oman by 46 runs
Match 7	27 January	Oman	Sultan Ahmed	Singapore	Chetan Suryawanshi	Al Dhaid Cricket Village, Al Dhaid	Singapore by 23 runs
Match 8	27 January	Kuwait	Aamir Javed	Maldives	Afzal Faiz	Sharjah Cricket Stadium, Sharjah	Kuwait by 9 wickets
Match 9	27 January	Malaysia	Ahmed Faiz	Saudi Arabia	Shoaib Ali	Sharjah Cricket Stadium, Sharjah	Saudi Arabia by 43 runs
Match 10	29 January	Maldives	Afzal Faiz	Oman	Sultan Ahmed	Sharjah Cricket Stadium, Sharjah	Oman by 7 wickets
Match 11	29 January	Saudi Arabia	Shoaib Ali	Singapore	Chetan Suryawanshi	Sharjah Cricket Stadium, Sharjah	Saudi Arabia by 8 runs
Match 12	29 January	Kuwait	Aamir Javed	Malaysia	Ahmed Faiz	Sharjah Cricket Stadium, Sharjah	Kuwait by 2 wickets
Match 13	30 January	Maldives	Afzal Faiz	Saudi Arabia	Sharjah Cricket Stadium, Sharjah	Saudi Arabia by 3 wickets	
Match 14	30 January	Kuwait	Aamir Javed	Oman	Sultan Ahmed	Sharjah Cricket Stadium, Sharjah	Oman by 11 runs
Match 15	30 January	Malaysia	Ahmed Faiz	Singapore	Chetan Suryawanshi	Sharjah Cricket Stadium, Sharjah	Malaysia by 6 wickets

===== Final placings =====
Pos	Team	Status
1	Oman	Qualified for 2015 ICC World Twenty20 Qualifier
2	Kuwait	
3	Saudi Arabia	
4	Malaysia	
5	Singapore	
6	Maldives	

=== Pakistan in New Zealand ===
ODI series
No.	Date	Home captain	Away captain	Venue	Result
ODI 3596	31 January	Brendon McCullum	Misbah-ul-Haq	Westpac Stadium, Wellington	New Zealand by 7 wickets
ODI 3598	3 February	Brendon McCullum	Misbah-ul-Haq	McLean Park, Napier	New Zealand by 119 runs

== February ==
=== England women in New Zealand ===
WODI series
No.	Date	Home captain	Away captain	Venue	Result
WODI 937	11 February	Suzie Bates	Charlotte Edwards	Bay Oval, Mount Maunganui	New Zealand by 67 runs
WODI 938	13 February	Suzie Bates	Charlotte Edwards	Bay Oval, Mount Maunganui	England by 90 runs
WODI 939	17 February	Suzie Bates	Charlotte Edwards	Bay Oval, Mount Maunganui	New Zealand by 9 wickets
WODI 940	26 February	Suzie Bates	Charlotte Edwards	Bert Sutcliffe Oval, Lincoln	England by 9 wickets
WODI 941	28 February	Suzie Bates	Charlotte Edwards	Bert Sutcliffe Oval, Lincoln	England by 5 wickets
WT20I series
No.	Date	Home captain	Away captain	Venue	Result
WT20I 298	19 February	Suzie Bates	Charlotte Edwards	Cobham Oval, Whangārei	England by 8 wickets
WT20I 299	20 February	Suzie Bates	Charlotte Edwards	Cobham Oval, Whangārei	New Zealand by 6 wickets
WT20I 300	24 February	Suzie Bates	Charlotte Edwards	Bert Sutcliffe Oval, Lincoln	England by 5 wickets

=== 2015 Cricket World Cup ===
==== Group stage ====
Pos	Team	Pld	W	L	T	NR	Pts	NRR
1	New Zealand	6	6	0	0	0	12	2.564
2	Australia	6	4	1	0	1	9	2.257
3	Sri Lanka	6	4	2	0	0	8	0.371
4	Bangladesh	6	3	2	0	1	7	0.136
5	England	6	2	4	0	0	4	−0.753
6	Afghanistan	6	1	5	0	0	2	−1.853
7	Scotland	6	0	6	0	0	0	−2.218

Source: ESPNcricinfo
- Advanced to knockout stage.

Pos	Team	Pld	W	L	T	NR	Pts	NRR
1	India	6	6	0	0	0	12	1.827
2	South Africa	6	4	2	0	0	8	1.707
3	Pakistan	6	4	2	0	0	8	−0.085
4	West Indies	6	3	3	0	0	6	−0.053
5	Ireland	6	3	3	0	0	6	−0.933
6	Zimbabwe	6	1	5	0	0	2	−0.527
7	United Arab Emirates	6	0	6	0	0	0	−2.032

Source: ESPNcricinfo
- Advanced to knockout stage.

Group stage
No.	Date	Team 1	Captain 1	Team 2	Captain 2	Venue	Result
ODI 3599	14 February	New Zealand	Brendon McCullum	Sri Lanka	Angelo Mathews	Hagley Oval, Christchurch	New Zealand by 98 runs
ODI 3600	14 February	Australia	George Bailey	England	Eoin Morgan	Melbourne Cricket Ground, Melbourne	Australia by 111 runs
ODI 3601	15 February	South Africa	AB de Villiers	Zimbabwe	Elton Chigumbura	Seddon Park, Hamilton	South Africa by 62 runs
ODI 3602	15 February	India	Mahendra Singh Dhoni	Pakistan	Misbah-ul-Haq	Adelaide Oval, Adelaide	India by 76 runs
ODI 3603	16 February	Ireland	William Porterfield	West Indies	Jason Holder	Saxton Oval, Nelson	Ireland by 4 wickets
ODI 3604	17 February	New Zealand	Brendon McCullum	Scotland	Preston Mommsen	University Oval, Dunedin	New Zealand by 3 wickets
ODI 3605	18 February	Bangladesh	Mashrafe Mortaza	Afghanistan	Mohammad Nabi	Manuka Oval, Canberra	Bangladesh by 105 runs
ODI 3606	19 February	Zimbabwe	Elton Chigumbura	UAE	Mohammad Tauqir	Saxton Oval, Nelson	Zimbabwe by 4 wickets
ODI 3607	20 February	New Zealand	Brendon McCullum	England	Eoin Morgan	Westpac Stadium, Wellington	New Zealand by 8 wickets
ODI 3608	21 February	West Indies	Jason Holder	Pakistan	Misbah-ul-Haq	Hagley Oval, Christchurch	West Indies by 150 runs
ODI 3608a	21 February	Australia	Michael Clarke	Bangladesh	Mashrafe Mortaza	The Gabba, Brisbane	No result
ODI 3609	22 February	Sri Lanka	Angelo Mathews	Afghanistan	Mohammad Nabi	University Oval, Dunedin	Sri Lanka by 4 wickets
ODI 3610	22 February	India	Mahendra Singh Dhoni	South Africa	AB de Villiers	Melbourne Cricket Ground, Melbourne	India by 130 runs
ODI 3611	23 February	England	Eoin Morgan	Scotland	Preston Mommsen	Hagley Oval, Christchurch	England by 119 runs
ODI 3612	24 February	West Indies	Jason Holder	Zimbabwe	Elton Chigumbura	Manuka Oval, Canberra	West Indies by 73 runs (DLS)
ODI 3613	25 February	Ireland	William Porterfield	UAE	Mohammad Tauqir	The Gabba, Brisbane	Ireland by 2 wickets
ODI 3614	26 February	Afghanistan	Mohammad Nabi	Scotland	Preston Mommsen	University Oval, Dunedin	Afghanistan by 1 wicket
ODI 3615	26 February	Bangladesh	Mashrafe Mortaza	Sri Lanka	Angelo Mathews	Melbourne Cricket Ground, Melbourne	Sri Lanka by 92 runs
ODI 3616	27 February	South Africa	AB de Villiers	West Indies	Jason Holder	Sydney Cricket Ground, Sydney	South Africa by 257 runs
ODI 3617	28 February	New Zealand	Brendon McCullum	Australia	Michael Clarke	Eden Park, Auckland	New Zealand by 1 wicket
ODI 3618	28 February	India	Mahendra Singh Dhoni	UAE	Mohammad Tauqir	WACA Ground, Perth	India by 9 wickets
ODI 3619	1 March	England	Eoin Morgan	Sri Lanka	Angelo Mathews	Westpac Stadium, Wellington	Sri Lanka by 9 wickets
ODI 3620	1 March	Pakistan	Misbah-ul-Haq	Zimbabwe	Elton Chigumbura	The Gabba, Brisbane	Pakistan by 20 runs
ODI 3621	3 March	Ireland	William Porterfield	South Africa	AB de Villiers	Manuka Oval, Canberra	South Africa by 201 runs
ODI 3622	4 March	Pakistan	Misbah-ul-Haq	UAE	Mohammad Tauqir	McLean Park, Napier	Pakistan by 129 runs
ODI 3623	4 March	Australia	Michael Clarke	Afghanistan	Mohammad Nabi	WACA Ground, Perth	Australia by 275 runs
ODI 3624	5 March	Bangladesh	Mashrafe Mortaza	Scotland	Preston Mommsen	Saxton Oval, Nelson	Bangladesh by 6 wickets
ODI 3625	6 March	India	Mahendra Singh Dhoni	West Indies	Jason Holder	WACA Ground, Perth	India by 4 wickets
ODI 3626	7 March	Pakistan	Misbah-ul-Haq	South Africa	AB de Villiers	Eden Park, Auckland	Pakistan by 29 runs (DLS)
ODI 3627	7 March	Ireland	William Porterfield	Zimbabwe	Brendan Taylor	Bellerive Oval, Hobart	Ireland by 5 runs
ODI 3628	8 March	New Zealand	Brendon McCullum	Afghanistan	Mohammad Nabi	McLean Park, Napier	New Zealand by 6 wickets
ODI 3629	8 March	Australia	Michael Clarke	Sri Lanka	Angelo Mathews	Sydney Cricket Ground, Sydney	Australia by 64 runs
ODI 3630	9 March	England	Eoin Morgan	Bangladesh	Mashrafe Mortaza	Adelaide Oval, Adelaide	Bangladesh by 15 runs
ODI 3631	10 March	India	Mahendra Singh Dhoni	Ireland	William Porterfield	Seddon Park, Hamilton	India by 8 wickets
ODI 3632	11 March	Sri Lanka	Angelo Mathews	Scotland	Preston Mommsen	Bellerive Oval, Hobart	Sri Lanka by 148 runs
ODI 3633	12 March	South Africa	AB de Villiers	UAE	Mohammad Tauqir	Westpac Stadium, Wellington	South Africa by 146 runs
ODI 3634	13 March	New Zealand	Brendon McCullum	Bangladesh	Shakib Al Hasan	Seddon Park, Hamilton	New Zealand by 3 wickets
ODI 3635	13 March	England	Eoin Morgan	Afghanistan	Mohammad Nabi	Sydney Cricket Ground, Sydney	England by 9 wickets (DLS)
ODI 3636	14 March	India	Mahendra Singh Dhoni	Zimbabwe	Brendan Taylor	Eden Park, Auckland	India by 6 wickets
ODI 3637	14 March	Australia	Michael Clarke	Scotland	Preston Mommsen	Bellerive Oval, Hobart	Australia by 7 wickets
ODI 3638	15 March	West Indies	Jason Holder	UAE	Mohammad Tauqir	McLean Park, Napier	West Indies by 6 wickets
ODI 3639	15 March	Ireland	William Porterfield	Pakistan	Misbah-ul-Haq	Adelaide Oval, Adelaide	Pakistan by 7 wickets

==== Knockout ====
Knockout stage
No.	Date	Team 1	Captain 1	Team 2	Captain 2	Venue	Result
Quarterfinals
ODI 3640	18 March	Sri Lanka	Angelo Mathews	South Africa	AB de Villiers	Sydney Cricket Ground, Sydney	South Africa by 9 wickets
ODI 3641	19 March	Bangladesh	Mashrafe Mortaza	India	Mahendra Singh Dhoni	Melbourne Cricket Ground, Melbourne	India by 109 runs
ODI 3642	20 March	Australia	Michael Clarke	Pakistan	Misbah-ul-Haq	Adelaide Oval, Adelaide	Australia by 6 wickets
ODI 3643	21 March	New Zealand	Brendon McCullum	West Indies	Jason Holder	Westpac Stadium, Wellington	New Zealand by 143 runs
Semifinals
ODI 3644	24 March	New Zealand	Brendon McCullum	South Africa	AB de Villiers	Eden Park, Auckland	New Zealand by 4 wickets (DLS)
ODI 3645	26 March	Australia	Michael Clarke	India	Mahendra Singh Dhoni	Sydney Cricket Ground, Sydney	Australia by 95 runs
Final
ODI 3646	29 March	Australia	Michael Clarke	New Zealand	Brendon McCullum	Melbourne Cricket Ground, Melbourne	Australia by 7 wickets

== March ==
=== South Africa women vs Pakistan women in UAE ===
WODI series
No.	Date	Home captain	Away captain	Venue	Result
WODI 942	13 March	Sana Mir	Mignon Du Preez	Sharjah Cricket Stadium, Sharjah	Pakistan by 57 runs
WODI 943	15 March	Sana Mir	Mignon Du Preez	Sharjah Cricket Stadium, Sharjah	South Africa by 3 wickets
WODI 944	17 March	Sana Mir	Mignon Du Preez	Sharjah Cricket Stadium, Sharjah	South Africa by 5 wickets
WT20I series
No.	Date	Home captain	Away captain	Venue	Result
WT20I 301	19 March	Sana Mir	Mignon Du Preez	Sharjah Cricket Stadium, Sharjah	Pakistan by 5 wickets
WT20I 302	20 March	Sana Mir	Mignon Du Preez	Sharjah Cricket Stadium, Sharjah	Pakistan by 6 wickets
WT20I 303	22 March	Sana Mir	Mignon Du Preez	Sharjah Cricket Stadium, Sharjah	South Africa by 7 wickets

=== 2015 ICC Africa Twenty20 Championship ===
==== Points table ====
Pos	Team	Pld	W	L	T	NR	Pts	NRR
1	Namibia	5	4	1	0	0	8	2.182
2	Kenya	5	4	1	0	0	8	1.663
3	Uganda	5	3	2	0	0	6	0.612
4	Ghana	5	3	2	0	0	6	−1.450
5	Botswana	5	1	4	0	0	2	−1.259
6	Tanzania	5	0	5	0	0	0	−1.774

Source: CricHQ

Round Robin Matches
No.	Date	Team 1	Team 2	Venue	Result
Match 1	27 March	Ghana	Namibia	Willowmoore Park, Benoni	Namibia by 90 runs
Match 2	27 March	Botswana	Kenya	Willowmoore Park, Benoni	Kenya by 6 wickets
Match 3	27 March	Tanzania	Uganda	Willowmoore Park, Benoni	Uganda by 8 wickets
Match 4	28 March	Botswana	Namibia	Willowmoore Park, Benoni	Namibia by 61 runs
Match 5	28 March	Ghana	Tanzania	Willowmoore Park, Benoni	Ghana by 5 wickets
Match 6	28 March	Kenya	Uganda	Willowmoore Park, Benoni	Kenya by 8 wickets
Match 7	29 March	Namibia	Tanzania	Willowmoore Park, Benoni	Namibia by 42 runs
Match 8	29 March	Botswana	Uganda	Willowmoore Park, Benoni	Uganda by 58 runs
Match 9	29 March	Ghana	Kenya	Willowmoore Park, Benoni	Kenya by 78 runs
Match 10	30 March	Namibia	Uganda	Willowmoore Park, Benoni	Uganda by 2 wickets
Match 11	30 March	Kenya	Tanzania	Willowmoore Park, Benoni	Kenya by 8 wickets
Match 12	30 March	Botswana	Ghana	Willowmoore Park, Benoni	Ghana by 4 wickets
Match 13	31 March	Kenya	Namibia	Willowmoore Park, Benoni	Namibia by 30 runs
Match 14	31 March	Ghana	Uganda	Willowmoore Park, Benoni	Ghana by 5 runs
Match 15	31 March	Botswana	Tanzania	Willowmoore Park, Benoni	Botswana by 35 runs
WCL Division Six Qualifier
No.	Date	Team 1	Team 2	Venue	Result
Only Match	2 April	Botswana	Ghana	Willowmoore Park, Benoni	Botswana by 8 wickets

===== Final placings =====
Pos	Team	Status
1	Namibia	Qualified for 2015 ICC World Twenty20 Qualifier
2	Kenya	Qualified for 2015 ICC World Twenty20 Qualifier
3	Uganda	
4	Ghana	
5	Botswana	
6	Tanzania	

== April ==
=== England in West Indies ===
2015 Wisden Trophy - Test series
No.	Date	Home captain	Away captain	Venue	Result
Test 2157	13–17 April	Denesh Ramdin	Alastair Cook	Sir Vivian Richards Stadium, North Sound, Antigua	Match drawn
Test 2158	21–25 April	Denesh Ramdin	Alastair Cook	National Cricket Stadium, St. George's, Grenada	England by 9 wickets
Test 2160	1–5 May	Denesh Ramdin	Alastair Cook	Kensington Oval, Bridgetown, Barbados	West Indies by 5 wickets

=== Pakistan in Bangladesh ===
ODI series
No.	Date	Home captain	Away captain	Venue	Result
ODI 3647	17 April	Shakib Al Hasan	Azhar Ali	Sher-e-Bangla National Cricket Stadium, Dhaka	Bangladesh by 79 runs
ODI 3648	19 April	Mashrafe Mortaza	Azhar Ali	Sher-e-Bangla National Cricket Stadium, Dhaka	Bangladesh by 7 wickets
ODI 3649	22 April	Mashrafe Mortaza	Azhar Ali	Sher-e-Bangla National Cricket Stadium, Dhaka	Bangladesh by 8 wickets
T20I series
No.	Date	Home captain	Away captain	Venue	Result
T20I 416	24 April	Mashrafe Mortaza	Shahid Afridi	Sher-e-Bangla National Cricket Stadium, Dhaka	Bangladesh by 7 wickets
Test series
No.	Date	Home captain	Away captain	Venue	Result
Test 2159	28 April – 2 May	Mushfiqur Rahim	Misbah-ul-Haq	Sheikh Abu Naser Stadium, Khulna	Match drawn
Test 2161	6–10 May	Mushfiqur Rahim	Misbah-ul-Haq	Sher-e-Bangla National Cricket Stadium, Dhaka	Pakistan by 328 runs
