= Umar Nawaz =

Umar Nawaz may refer to:

- Umar Nawaz (cricketer) (born 1986), Canadian cricketer
- Umar Nawaz (footballer) (born 2008), Pakistani footballer
