= 2018 ICC World Cricket League Division Two =

International cricket tournament

- Dates: 8 – 15 February 2018
- Administrator: International Cricket Council
- Cricket format: List A
- Tournament format(s): Round-robin and Knockout
- Host: Namibia
- Champions: United Arab Emirates (3rd title)
- Runners-up: Nepal
- Participants: 6
- Matches: 18
- Player of the series: (Nepal) Sandeep Lamichhane
- Most runs: (Nepal) Paras Khadka (241)
- Most wickets: (Nepal) Sandeep Lamichhane (17) (Oman) Bilal Khan (17)

2018 ICC World Cricket League Division Two was a cricket tournament that took place in February 2018 in Namibia. The United Arab Emirates won the tournament, after beating Nepal by 7 runs in the final. Canada and Namibia finished third and fourth respectively and remained in Division Two. Oman and Kenya finished fifth and sixth respectively and were both relegated to Division Three. Following Kenya's last-place finish in the tournament, their captain Rakep Patel and coach Thomas Odoyo both resigned.

Oman and Canada were the top two teams in the 2017 ICC World Cricket League Division Three tournament in Uganda and were promoted as a result. They were joined by the bottom four teams from the 2015–17 ICC World Cricket League Championship to determine the final two spots in the 2018 Cricket World Cup Qualifier. Following the conclusion of the round-robin stage, Nepal and the United Arab Emirates claimed the final places in the World Cup Qualifier.

The group-stage match between Kenya and Namibia was originally scheduled to take place on 9 February. No play was possible, due to a wet outfield, so the match was moved to the following day. The match was abandoned on the reserve day, also due to rain. Under the rules of the tournament, the fixture was rescheduled to be played on 13 February, after the conclusion of the matches on 11 and 12 February.

== Teams ==
Top 2 teams from the 2017 ICC World Cricket League Division Three:

- Canada
- Oman

Bottom 4 teams from the 2015–17 ICC World Cricket League Championship

- Kenya
- United Arab Emirates
- Nepal
- Namibia

== Squads ==
The following players were selected for the tournament:

Canada Coach: Ingleton Liburd	Kenya Coach: Thomas Odoyo	Namibia Coach: Dayanand Thakur	Nepal Coach: Jagat Tamata	Oman Coach: Duleep Mendis	United Arab Emirates Coach: Russell Domingo
Nitish Kumar (c); Bhavindu Adhihetty; Saad Bin Zafar; Navneet Dhaliwal; Satsimranjit Dhindsa; Nikhil Dutta; Ruvindu Gunasekera; Dillon Heyliger; Nicholas Kirton; Dhanuka Pathirana; Cecil Pervez; Junaid Siddiqui; Hamza Tariq (wk); Srimantha Wijeratne	Rakep Patel (c); Emmanuel Bundi; Dhiren Gondaria; Irfan Karim; Karan Kaul; Shem Ngoche; Alex Obanda; Collins Obuya; Nehemiah Odhiambo; Nelson Odhiambo; Lucas Oluoch; Rushab Patel; Gurdeep Singh; Hiren Varaiya	Sarel Burger (c); Jean Bredenkamp; Stephan Baard; Petrus Burger; Gerhard Erasmus; Jan Frylinck; Zane Green; Jean-Pierre Kotze; Tangeni Lungameni; Lo-handre Louwrens; Bernard Scholtz; JJ Smit; Louis van der Westhuizen; Christi Viljoen; Craig Williams	Paras Khadka (c); Dipendra Singh Airee; Lalit Bhandari; Sunil Dhamala; Shakti Gauchan; Sompal Kami; Karan KC; Sandeep Lamichhane; Gyanendra Malla; Dilip Nath (wk); Rohit Paudel; Basanta Regmi; Anil Sah; Aarif Sheikh; Sharad Vesawkar	Sultan Ahmed (c, wk); Zeeshan Maqsood (vc); Khawar Ali; Fayyaz Butt; Aqib Ilyas; Kaleemullah; Swapnil Khadye; Bilal Khan; Naseem Khushi; Ajay Lalcheta; Mohammad Nadeem; Jay Odedra; Jatinder Singh; Vaibhav Wategaonkar	Rohan Mustafa (c); Ashfaq Ahmed; Qadeer Ahmed; Shaiman Anwar; Mohammad Boota; Imran Haider; Amir Hayat; Zahoor Khan; Adnan Mufti; Mohammad Naveed; Ahmed Raza; Ghulam Shabber; Rameez Shahzad; Muhammad Usman

== Points table ==
Pos	Team	Pld	W	L	T	NR	Pts	NRR	Qualification or relegation
1	Nepal	5	4	1	0	0	8	−0.124	Met in the final and advanced to the 2018 Cricket World Cup Qualifier
2	United Arab Emirates	5	3	2	0	0	6	1.034	Met in the final and advanced to the 2018 Cricket World Cup Qualifier
3	Canada	5	3	2	0	0	6	0.868	Met in the 3rd-place playoff and remain in Division Two
4	Namibia	5	3	2	0	0	6	0.566	Met in the 3rd-place playoff and remain in Division Two
5	Oman	5	2	3	0	0	4	−0.508	Met in the 5th-place playoff and relegated to 2018 Division Three
6	Kenya	5	0	5	0	0	0	−1.834	Met in the 5th-place playoff and relegated to 2018 Division Three

Source: Cricinfo

== Fixtures ==
The following dates and venues were confirmed for the tournament:

=== Round-robin ===
8 February 2018
09:30
Scorecard

United Arab Emirates; 309/8 (50 overs)	v	Kenya; 91 (32.4 overs)

United Arab Emirates won by 218 runs
Wanderers Cricket Ground, Windhoek

- Kenya won the toss and elected to field.

8 February 2018
09:30
Scorecard

Namibia; 138 (34.2 overs)	v	Nepal; 139/9 (49.2 overs)

Nepal won by 1 wicket
Affies Park, Windhoek

- Nepal won the toss and elected to field.
- Rohit Paudel (Nepal) made his List A debut.

8 February 2018
09:30
Scorecard

Oman; 106 (27.4 overs)	v	Canada; 108/2 (15.4 overs)

Canada won by 8 wickets
United Ground, Windhoek

- Canada won the toss and elected to field.
- Bhavindu Adhihetty, Nicholas Kirton, Dillon Heyliger (Canada), Aqib Ilyas, Fayyaz Butt, Jay Odedra, Kaleemullah and Bilal Khan (Oman) all made their List A debuts.

9 February 2018
09:30
Scorecard

Canada; 209 (49.2 overs)	v	United Arab Emirates; 186 (45 overs)

Canada won by 23 runs
Wanderers Cricket Ground, Windhoek

- United Arab Emirates won the toss and elected to field.

9 February 2018
09:30
Scorecard

Nepal; 138 (46 overs)	v	Oman; 139/4 (35.1 overs)

Oman won by 6 wickets
Affies Park, Windhoek

- Oman won the toss and elected to field.

9–10 February 2018
09:30
Scorecard

Kenya; 83 (38.5 overs)	v	Namibia; 15/0 (5 overs)

No result
United Ground, Windhoek

- Namibia won the toss and elected to field.
- No play was possible due to wet outfield, with the match moved to the reserve day. On reserve day, the start was delayed by a wet outfield and the match reduced to 45 overs per side.
- The match was abandoned on the reserve day, also due to rain. With all the matches played on 11 and 12 February reaching a conclusion, the match was replayed on 13 February.

11 February 2018
09:30
Scorecard

Oman; 164 (48.5 overs)	v	Namibia; 165/8 (49.4 overs)

Namibia won by 2 wickets
Wanderers Cricket Ground, Windhoek

- Namibia won the toss and elected to field.

11 February 2018
09:30
Scorecard

Canada; 186 (49.2 overs)	v	Kenya; 127 (39.1 overs)

Canada won by 59 runs
Affies Park, Windhoek

- Kenya won the toss and elected to field.

11 February 2018
09:30
Scorecard

United Arab Emirates; 114 (31 overs)	v	Nepal; 115/6 (28.5 overs)

Nepal won by 4 wickets
United Ground, Windhoek

- Nepal won the toss and elected to field.
- The start was delayed by a wet outfield and the match reduced to 34 overs per side.
- Anil Sah (Nepal) made his List A debut.

12 February 2018
09:30
Scorecard

Kenya; 177/8 (50 overs)	v	Nepal; 178/7 (50 overs)

Nepal won by 3 wickets
Wanderers Cricket Ground, Windhoek.

- Nepal won the toss and elected to field.

12 February 2018
09:30
Scorecard

United Arab Emirates; 159 (46 overs)	v	Oman; 113 (36.5 overs)

United Arab Emirates won by 46 runs
Affies Park, Windhoek

- United Arab Emirates won the toss and elected to bat.

12 February 2018
09:30
Scorecard

Namibia; 268/8 (50 overs)	v	Canada; 251/8 (50 overs)

Namibia won by 17 runs
United Ground, Windhoek

- Canada won the toss and elected to field.

13 February 2018
09:30
Scorecard

Kenya; 110 (30.1 overs)	v	Namibia; 111/2 (16 overs)

Namibia won by 8 wickets
United Ground, Windhoek

- Kenya won the toss and elected to bat.

14 February 2018
09:30
Scorecard

Canada; 194/8 (50 overs)	v	Nepal; 195/9 (50 overs)

Nepal won by 1 wicket
Wanderers Cricket Ground, Windhoek

- Nepal won the toss and elected to field.

14 February 2018
09:30
Scorecard

United Arab Emirates; 247/6 (50 overs)	v	Namibia; 228 (49.4 overs)

United Arab Emirates won by 19 runs
Affies Park, Windhoek

- Namibia won the toss and elected to field.

14 February 2018
09:30
Scorecard

Kenya; 200 (49.5 overs)	v	Oman; 184/8 (41.1 overs)

Oman won by 2 wickets (DLS method)
United Ground, Windhoek

- Oman won the toss and elected to field.
- Rain set Oman a revised target of 183 runs from 42 overs.

== Playoffs ==
=== Fifth-place playoff ===
15 February 2018
09:30
Scorecard

Kenya; 253 (49.5 overs)	v	Oman; 257/5 (47 overs)

Oman won by 5 wickets
United Ground, Windhoek

- Oman won the toss and elected to field.
- Naseem Khushi (Oman) made his List A debut.

=== Third-place playoff ===
15 February 2018
09:30
Scorecard

Canada; 247/4 (50 overs)	v	Namibia; 198 (47.5 overs)

Canada won by 49 runs
Affies Park, Windhoek

- Canada won the toss and elected to bat.

=== Final ===
15 February 2018
09:30
Scorecard

United Arab Emirates; 277/4 (50 overs)	v	Nepal; 270/8 (50 overs)

United Arab Emirates won by 7 runs
Wanderers Cricket Ground, Windhoek

- United Arab Emirates won the toss and elected to bat.

== Final standings ==
Pos	Team	Status
1st	United Arab Emirates	Advanced to the 2018 Cricket World Cup Qualifier
2nd	Nepal	Advanced to the 2018 Cricket World Cup Qualifier
3rd	Canada	Remained in Division Two
4th	Namibia	Remained in Division Two
5th	Oman	Relegated to Division Three for 2018
6th	Kenya	Relegated to Division Three for 2018
