= Satsimranjit Dhindsa =

Canadian cricketer (born 1991)

Personal information
- Born: 5 February 1991 (age 35); India
- Batting: Right-handed

International information
- National side: Canada
- Source: Cricinfo, 17 January 2015

Satsimranjit Dhindsa (born 5 February 1991) is a Canadian cricketer. He made his List A cricket debut in the 2015 ICC World Cricket League Division Two tournament for Canada against the Netherlands on 17 January 2015.

In January 2018, he was named in Canada's squad for the 2018 ICC World Cricket League Division Two tournament.

On 3 June 2018, he was selected to play for the Edmonton Royals in the players' draft for the inaugural edition of the Global T20 Canada tournament. In June 2019, he was selected to play for the Edmonton Royals franchise team in the 2019 Global T20 Canada tournament.
