= Srimantha Wijeratne =

Sri Lankan cricketer (born 1989)

Personal information
- Born: 3 June 1989 (age 37); Colombo, Sri Lanka
- Batting: Right-handed
- Role: Wicket-keeper–batsman

International information
- National side: Canada
- ODI debut (cap 94): 27 March 2023 v Jersey
- Last ODI: 7 March 2024 v Scotland
- T20I debut (cap 53): 25 October 2019 v Oman
- Last T20I: 13 April 2024 v United States

Domestic team information
- Years: Team
- 2016–2017: ICC Americas
- 2016–2017: Sri Lanka Police Sports Club
- 2018: Vancouver Knights
- Source: Cricinfo, 31 October 2024

Srimantha Wijeratne (born 3 June 1989) is a Sri Lankan-born Canadian cricketer. He has represented the Canada national cricket team since 2015 and plays as a right-handed wicketkeeper/batsman.

== Personal life ==
Wijeratne was born on 3 June 1989 in Colombo, Sri Lanka. He attended St. Peter's College, Colombo. He immigrated to Canada in 2008.

== International career ==
In 2007, Wijeratne represented the Sri Lanka national under-19 cricket team in a Test against Bangladesh, opening the batting with Lahiru Thirimanne.

Wijeratne made his List A cricket debut in the 2015 ICC World Cricket League Division Two tournament against the Netherlands on 17 January 2015. He was in Canada's squad for the 2018 ICC World Cricket League Division Two tournament.

In September 2018, he was named in Canada's squad for the 2018–19 ICC World Twenty20 Americas Qualifier tournament. In October 2018, he was named in Canada's squad for the 2018–19 Regional Super50 tournament in the West Indies. In April 2019, he was named in Canada's squad for the 2019 ICC World Cricket League Division Two tournament in Namibia. In September 2019, he was named in Canada's squad for the 2019 Malaysia Cricket World Cup Challenge League A tournament.

In October 2019, he was named in Canada's squad for the 2019 ICC T20 World Cup Qualifier tournament in the United Arab Emirates. He made his Twenty20 International (T20I) debut for Canada, against Oman, on 25 October 2019.

In March 2023, he was named in Canada's squad for the 2023 Cricket World Cup Qualifier Play-off. He made his One Day International (ODI) debut on 27 March 2023, for Canada, against Jersey in that tournament.

== Domestic and franchise career ==
Before moving to Canada, Wijeratne played for Bloomfield Cricket and Athletic Club at under-23 level. He returned to Sri Lanka to play for Police Sports Club during the 2017-18 Sri Lankan domestic season.

In June 2018, Wijeratne was selected to play for the Vancouver Knights in the players' draft for the inaugural edition of the Global T20 Canada tournament.
