= Narendra Kalyan =

Kenyan cricketer (born 1986)

Narendra Kalyan Patel
Personal information
- Born: 30 November 1986 (age 39)

International information
- National side: Kenya
- Source: Cricinfo, 23 January 2015

Narendra Kalyan Patel (born 30 November 1986) is a Kenyan cricketer. He made his List A cricket debut in the 2015 ICC World Cricket League Division Two tournament against Namibia on 17 January 2015. In November 2018, he was named in Kenya's squad for the 2018 ICC World Cricket League Division Three tournament in Oman, as a replacement for Collins Obuya.
