= Jeroen Brand =

Dutch cricketer

Personal information
- Born: 3 April 1982 (age 44); The Hague, Netherlands

International information
- National side: Netherlands
- Source: Cricinfo, 21 January 2015

Jeroen Brand (born 3 April 1982) is a Dutch cricketer. He made his List A cricket debut in the 2015 ICC World Cricket League Division Two tournament for the Netherlands against Kenya on 21 January 2015.
