= 2015 ICC World Cricket League Division Two =

- Dates: 17 January – 24 January 2015
- Administrator: ICC
- Cricket format: List A
- Tournament format(s): Round-robin and Playoffs
- Host: Namibia
- Champions: Netherlands
- Participants: 6
- Matches: 18
- Player of the series: (Nepal) Paras Khadka
- Most runs: (Namibia) Stephan Baard (249)
- Most wickets: (Netherlands) Ahsan Malik (17)
- Official website: ICC World Cricket League

The 2015 ICC World Cricket League Division Two was a cricket divisional tournament organised by the International Cricket Council. It formed part of the ICC World Cricket League and a qualification pathway for the ICC World Cup 2019.

The tournament was held in Namibia from 17 to 24 January 2015. The Netherlands won the tournament, beating the hosts Namibia by 8 wickets in the final.

== Teams ==
The six teams that took part in the tournament were decided according to the results of the 2014 World Cup Qualifier and the 2014 ICC World Cricket League Division Three.

Key
Denotes relegated teams
Denotes promoted teams

Team	Last outcome
Kenya	5th in 2014 World Cup Qualifier, New Zealand
Namibia	6th in 2014 World Cup Qualifier, New Zealand
Netherlands	7th in 2014 World Cup Qualifier, New Zealand
Canada	8th in 2014 World Cup Qualifier, New Zealand
Nepal	1st in 2014 ICC World Cricket League Division Three, Malaysia
Uganda	2nd in 2014 ICC World Cricket League Division Three, Malaysia

== Squads ==
Canada	Kenya	Namibia	Nepal	Netherlands	Uganda
Amarbir Hansra (C); Rizwan Cheema; Parth Desai; Navneet Dhaliwal; Satsimranjit Dhindsa; Nikhil Dutta; Ruvindu Gunasekera; Nitish Kumar; Usman Limbada; Umer Nawaz; Cecil Pervez; Durand Soraine; Hamza Tariq; Srimantha Wijeratne	Rakep Patel (C); Jadhavji Bhimji; Dhiren Gondaria; Gurdeep Singh; Jimmy Kamande; Irfan Karim; James Ngoche; Shem Ngoche; Alex Obanda; Collins Obuya; Nelson Odhiambo; Nehemiah Odhiambo; Lucas Oluoch; Elijah Otieno; Narendra Patel	Nicolaas Scholtz (C); Stephen Baard; Sarel Burger; Merwe Erasmus; Louis Klazinga; Bjorn Kotze; Jean-Pierre Kotze; Bernard Scholtz; JJ Smit; Christiaan Snyman; Gerrie Snyman; Raymond van Schoor; Craig Williams; Pikky Ya France	Paras Khadka (C); Gyanendra Malla (vc); Binod Bhandari (wk); Amrit Bhattarai; Naresh Budhayer; Shakti Gauchan; Sompal Kami; Bhuwan Karki; Karan KC; Subash Khakurel (wk); Sagar Pun; Basanta Regmi; Aarif Sheikh; Sharad Vesawkar	Peter Borren (C); Rahil Ahmed; Wesley Barresi; Jeroen Brand; Mudassar Bukhari; Ben Cooper; Vivian Kingma; Ahsan Malik; Stephan Myburgh; Michael Rippon; Pieter Seelaar; Eric Szwarczynski; Paul van Meekeren; Matthijs van Schelven	Frank Nsubuga (C); Davis Arinaitwe; Hamu Kayondo; Arthur Kyobe; Brian Masaba; Deusdedit Muhumuza; Roger Mukasa; Lepono Ndhlovu; Patrick Ochan; Danniel Ruyange; Phillimon Selowa; Laurence Sematimba; Jonathan Ssebanja; Henry Ssenyondo

== Fixtures ==
All times are Namibia Standard Time (UTC+02:00) at NST

=== Round robin ===
==== Points table ====
Pos	Team	Pld	W	L	T	NR	Pts	NRR	Qualification or relegation
1	Namibia	5	4	1	0	0	8	1.025	Met in the final and qualified for the 2015-17 ICC World Cricket League Championship, Qualified for the 2015-17 ICC Intercontinental Cup
2	Netherlands	5	3	2	0	0	6	0.642	Met in the final and qualified for the 2015-17 ICC World Cricket League Championship, Qualified for the 2015-17 ICC Intercontinental Cup
3	Nepal	5	3	2	0	0	6	0.388	Met in the 3rd place playoff and qualified for the 2015-17 ICC World Cricket League Championship
4	Kenya	5	2	3	0	0	4	−0.197	Met in the 3rd place playoff and qualified for the 2015-17 ICC World Cricket League Championship
5	Canada	5	2	3	0	0	4	−0.317	Met in the 5th place playoff and relegated to 2017 Division Three
6	Uganda	5	1	4	0	0	2	−1.599	Met in the 5th place playoff and relegated to 2017 Division Three

Points system:

In the event of teams finishing on equal points, the right to play in the final match or series was determined as follows:

- The team with the highest number of wins
- If still equal, the team with the highest net run rate

In a match declared as no result, run rate is not applicable.

Won (W): 2
Lost (L): 0
No result (NR): 1
Tie (T): 1

- Net run rate (NRR): Runs per over scored less runs per over conceded, adjusting team batting first to overs of team batting second in rain rule matches, adjusting to team's full allocation if all out, and ignoring no result matches.

==== Matches ====
All matches are scheduled to start at 09:30 local time

17 January
09:30
Scorecard

Netherlands; 251/7 (50 overs)	v	Canada; 184 (46 overs)
Wesley Barresi 83* (61); Parth Desai 3/57 (10 overs)		Hamza Tariq 61 (55); Vivian Kingma 4/32 (10 overs)

Netherlands won by 67 runs
United Cricket Club Ground, Windhoek
Umpires: David Odhiambo (Ken) and Tim Robinson (Eng)
Player of the match: Wesley Barresi (Ned)

- Canada won the toss and elected to field.
- Navneet Dhaliwal, Satsimranjit Dhindsa and Srimantha Wijeratne (all Canada) made their List A debuts.

17 January
09:30
Scorecard

Kenya; 191/8 (50 overs)	v	Namibia; 194/5 (39.2 overs)
Nelson Odhiambo 54 (76); Sarel Burger 3/40 (10 overs)		Stephan Baard 97 (96); Nelson Odhiambo 3/34 (10 overs)

Namibia won by 5 wickets
Wanderers Cricket Ground, Windhoek
Umpires: Shaun George (SA) and Mark Hawthorne (Ire)
Player of the match: Stephan Baard (Nam)

- Namibia won the toss and elected to field.
- Narendra Patel (Kenya) made his List A debut.

17 January
09:30
Scorecard

Uganda; 146 (49.5 overs)	v	Nepal; 144 (50 overs)
Brian Masaba 43 (70); Paras Khadka 3/14 (9 overs)		Gyanendra Malla 34 (66); Henry Ssenyondo 3/21 (10 overs)

Uganda won by 2 runs
Wanderers Affies Park, Windhoek
Umpires: Anil Chaudhary (Ind) and Ian Ramage (Sco)
Player of the match: Davis Karashani (Uga)

- Uganda won the toss and elected to bat.
- Naresh Budhayer, Karan KC and Subash Khakurel (all Nepal) made their List A debuts.

18 January
09:30
Scorecard

Canada; 257/6 (50 overs)	v	Kenya; 211 (48 overs)
Navneet Dhaliwal 93 (109); Nelson Odhiambo 4/46 (7 overs)		Collins Obuya 78 (111); Parth Desai 4/45 (8 overs)

Canada won by 46 runs
Wanderers Affies Park, Windhoek
Umpires: Anil Chaudhary (Ind) and Shaun George (SA)
Player of the match: Navneet Dhaliwal (Can)

- Canada won the toss and elected to bat.

18 January
09:30
Scorecard

Uganda; 188/9 (50 overs)	v	Namibia; 189/6 (46.2 overs)
Phillemon Mukobe 46 (59); Bjorn Kotze 3/34 (9 overs)		Gerhard Erasmus 62 (91); Henry Ssenyondo 2/30 (10 overs)

Namibia won by 4 wickets
Wanderers Cricket Ground, Windhoek
Umpires: Buddhi Pradhan (Nep) and Tim Robinson (Eng)
Player of the match: Gerhard Erasmus (Nam)

- Uganda won the toss and elected to bat.

18 January
09:30
Scorecard

Netherlands; 158 (49.5 overs)	v	Nepal; 159/8 (49.3 overs)
Michael Rippon 53 (117); Basanta Regmi 2/22 (10 overs)		Binod Bhandari 35 (30); Ahsan Malik 2/25 (8.3 overs)

Nepal won by 2 wickets
United Cricket Club Ground, Windhoek
Umpires: Mark Hawthorne (Ire) and Ian Ramage (Sco)
Player of the match: Michael Rippon (Ned)

- Netherlands won the toss and elected to bat.

20 January
09:30
Scorecard

Canada; 114 (49.2 overs)	v	Nepal; 115/3 (23.1 overs)
Satsimranjit Dhindsa 25* (37); Karan KC 5/26 (10 overs)		Paras Khadka 77 (78); Satsimranjit Dhindsa 2/29 (7 overs)

Nepal won by 7 wickets
Wanderers Cricket Ground, Windhoek
Umpires: Mark Hawthorne (Ire) and Tim Robinson (Eng)
Player of the match: Paras Khadka (Nep)

- Canada won the toss and elected to bat.

20 January
09:30
Scorecard

Uganda; 129 (43.2 overs)	v	Kenya; 130/5 (33.1 overs)
Arthur Kyobe 24 (38); Shem Ngoche 4/17 (10 overs)		Alex Obanda 32 (45); Frank Nsubuga 2/23 (6 overs)

Kenya won by 5 wickets
United Cricket Club Ground, Windhoek
Umpires: Buddhi Pradhan (Nep) and Ian Ramage (Sco)
Player of the match: Shem Ngoche (Ken)

- Kenya won the toss and elected to field.

20 January
09:30
Scorecard

Namibia; 314/9 (50 overs)	v	Netherlands; 126 (28.1 overs)
Gerhard Erasmus 91 (83); Ahsan Malik 3/49 (10 overs)		Michael Rippon 23 (33); Louis Klazinga 3/19 (4 overs)

Namibia won by 188 runs
Wanderers Affies Park, Windhoek
Umpires: Shaun George (SA) and David Odhiambo (Ken)
Player of the match: Gerhard Erasmus (Nam)

- Netherlands won the toss and elected to field.

21 January
09:30
Scorecard

Canada; 293/6 (50 overs)	v	Uganda; 182 (42 overs)
Nitish Kumar 104 (106); Roger Mukasa 2/57 (9 overs)		Phillimon Selowa 70 (78); Cecil Pervez 4/23 (7 overs)

Canada won by 111 runs
Wanderers Affies Park, Windhoek
Umpires: David Odhiambo (Ken) and Ian Ramage (Sco)
Player of the match: Nitish Kumar (Can)

- Canada won the toss and elected to bat.

21 January
09:30
Scorecard

Kenya; 212/9 (50 overs)	v	Netherlands; 217/5 (30.5 overs)
Narendra Patel 48 (60); Ahsan Malik 3/27 (10 overs)		Stephan Myburgh 95 (64); James Ngoche 4/52 (10 overs)

Netherlands won by 5 wickets
Wanderers Cricket Ground, Windhoek
Umpires: Shaun George (SA) and Buddhi Pradhan (Nep)
Player of the match: Stephan Myburgh (Ned)

- Netherlands won the toss and elected to field.
- Rahil Ahmed, Jeroen Brand and Matthijs van Schelven (all Netherlands) made their List A debuts.

21 January
09:30
Scorecard

Namibia; 142 (49.1 overs)	v	Nepal; 146/7 (37.5 overs)
Raymond van Schoor 28 (80); Karan KC 3/12 (6.1 overs)		Paras Khadka 64 (56); Gerrie Snyman 3/23 (7 overs)

Nepal won by 3 wickets
United Cricket Club Ground, Windhoek
Umpires: Anil Chaudhary (Ind) and Tim Robinson (Eng)
Player of the match: Paras Khadka (Nep)

- Nepal won the toss and elected to field.
- Aarif Sheikh (Nepal) made his List A debut.

23 January
09:30
Scorecard

Nepal; 194 (49.5 overs)	v	Kenya; 195/5 (35.0 overs)
Gyanendra Malla 91* (116); Elijah Otieno 3/47 (10 overs)		Irfan Karim 75 (94 overs); Karan KC 1/34 (6 overs)

Kenya won by 5 wickets
Wanderers Affies Park, Windhoek
Umpires: Anil Chaudhary (Ind) and Mark Hawthorne (Ire)
Player of the match: Irfan Karim (Ken)

- Kenya won the toss and elected to field.

23 January
09:30
Scorecard

Canada; 224 (50 overs)	v	Namibia; 225/2 (40.3 overs)
Srimantha Wijeratne 52 (83); Craig Williams 6/37 (10 overs)		Gerrie Snyman 83 (74); Nikhil Dutta 1/39 (10 overs)

Namibia won by 8 wickets
United Cricket Club Ground, Windhoek
Umpires: Shaun George (SA) and Buddhi Pradhan (Nep)
Player of the match: Craig Williams (Nam)

- Namibia won the toss and elected to field.

23 January
09:30
Scorecard

Uganda; 79 (23.4 overs)	v	Netherlands; 80/3 (6.3 overs)
Brian Masaba 17 (27); Ahsan Malik 5/7 (6.4 overs)		Peter Borren 29 (16); Jonathan Ssebanja 2/42 (3 overs)

Netherlands won by 7 wickets
Wanderers Cricket Ground, Windhoek
Umpires: David Odhiambo (Ken) and Ian Ramage (Sco)
Player of the match: Ahsan Malik (Ned)

- Netherlands won the toss and elected to field.

=== Playoffs ===
==== 5th place playoff ====
24 January
09:30
Scorecard

Canada; 140/6 (46 overs)	v	Uganda; 144/2 (25.2 overs)
Hamza Tariq 32 (48); Henry Ssenyondo 3/21 (10 overs)		Phillimon Selowa 48* (57); Jimmy Hansra 1/19 (6.2 overs)

Uganda won by 8 wickets
United Cricket Club Ground, Windhoek
Umpires: David Odhiambo (Ken) and Buddhi Pradhan (Nep)
Player of the match: Henry Ssenyondo (Uga)

- Canada won the toss and elected to bat.
- Umar Nawaz (Can) and Hamu Kayondo (Uga) made their List A debuts.

==== 3rd place playoff ====
24 January
09:30
Scorecard

Kenya; 208/9 (50 overs)	v	Nepal; 193 (47 overs)
Nelson Odhiambo 48 (76); Sompal Kami 3/41 (10 overs)		Binod Bhandari 73 (83); Elijah Otieno 4/45 (10 overs)

Kenya won by 15 runs
Wanderers Affies Park, Windhoek
Umpires: Mark Hawthorne (Ire) and Tim Robinson (Eng)
Player of the match: Narendra Patel (Ken)

- Nepal won the toss and elected to field.
- Bhuvan Karki (Nep) made his List A debut.

==== Final ====
24 January
09:30
Scorecard

Namibia; 212 (49.2 overs)	v	Netherlands; 213/2 (41.0 overs)
Craig Williams 54 (56); Michael Rippon 5/37 (10 overs)		Peter Borren 60* (76); Bernard Scholtz 1/30 (6 overs)

Netherlands won by 8 wickets
Wanderers Cricket Ground, Windhoek
Umpires: Anil Chaudhary (Ind) and Ian Ramage (Sco)
Player of the match: Michael Rippon (Ned)

- Netherlands won the toss and elected to field.

== Statistics ==
=== Most runs ===
The top five run scorers (total runs) of the tournament were:

Player	Team	Runs	Inns	Avg	S/R	HS	100s	50s
Stephen Baard	Namibia	249	6	41.50	87.36	97	0	2
Gerhard Erasmus	Namibia	241	6	48.20	70.46	91	0	2
Gyanendra Malla	Nepal	236	6	59.00	62.26	91*	0	1
Stephan Myburgh	Netherlands	235	6	39.16	93.25	95	0	2
Gerrie Snyman	Namibia	206	6	34.33	78.03	83	0	2

Source: Cricinfo

=== Most wickets ===
The tournament's top five wicket takers (total wickets) were:

Player	Team	Over	Wkts	Mts	Ave	S/R	Econ	BBI
Ahsan Malik	Netherlands	49.3	17	6	10.17	17.4	3.49	5/7
Michael Rippon	Netherlands	49	14	6	15.57	21.0	4.44	5/37
Craig Williams	Namibia	44.5	13	6	14.92	20.6	4.92	6/37
Nelson Odhiambo	Kenya	38	11	6	17.00	20.7	4.92	4/46
Sompal Kami	Nepal	52.4	11	6	19.18	28.7	4.00	3/41

Source: Cricinfo

== Final placings ==
After the conclusion of the tournament the teams were distributed as follows:

Pos.	Team	Status
1st	Netherlands	Qualified for the 2015–17 Intercontinental Cup and the 2015–17 World Cricket League Championship
2nd	Namibia	Qualified for the 2015–17 Intercontinental Cup and the 2015–17 World Cricket League Championship
3rd	Kenya	Qualified for the 2015–17 World Cricket League Championship
4th	Nepal	Qualified for the 2015–17 World Cricket League Championship
5th	Uganda	Relegated to Division Three for 2017
6th	Canada	Relegated to Division Three for 2017
