= Umar Nawaz (cricketer) =

Canadian cricketer (born 1986)

Personal information
- Born: 7 December 1986 (age 39)
- Batting: Right-handed

International information
- National side: Canada
- Source: Cricinfo, 24 January 2015

Umar Nawaz (born 7 December 1986) is a Canadian cricketer. He made his List A cricket debut in the 2015 ICC World Cricket League Division Two tournament for Canada against Uganda on 24 January 2015.
