= Affies Park =

Cricket ground in Windhoek, Namibia

- Windhoek Afrikaans Primary School Ground
- Interactive map of Affies Park

Ground information
- Location: Windhoek, Namibia
- Country: Namibia
- Coordinates: 22.592269737924482°S 17.07011413077243°E
- Establishment: 2014 (first recorded match)
- Capacity: n/a
- End names
- n/a

International information
- Only ODI: 27 April 2019: Papua New Guinea v United States
- As of 4 September 2020; Source: Ground profile

Affies Park, formerly Windhoek Afrikaans Primary School Ground, is a cricket ground in Windhoek, Namibia. The first recorded match on the ground was in 2014. It was used as a venue for matches in the 2015 ICC World Cricket League Division Two tournament.
