= 2020 Kings XI Punjab season =

Indian Premier League cricket team season

Kings XI Punjab
2020 season
- Coach: Anil Kumble
- Captain: KL Rahul
- Most runs: KL Rahul (670 Runs)
- Most wickets: Mohammed Shami (20 wickets)

The 2020 season was the 13th season for the Indian Premier League franchise Kings XI Punjab. They were one of the eight teams that competed in the 2020 Indian Premier League. The Kings XI Punjab's catchment areas are Kashmir, Jammu, Himachal Pradesh, Punjab and Haryana—evident from the letter sequence "K J H P H" in the banner of the team's logo. Kings XI Punjab finished the tournament in 6th position with 6 wins and 8 losses, failing to qualify for the playoffs.

== Background ==
=== Player retention and transfers ===
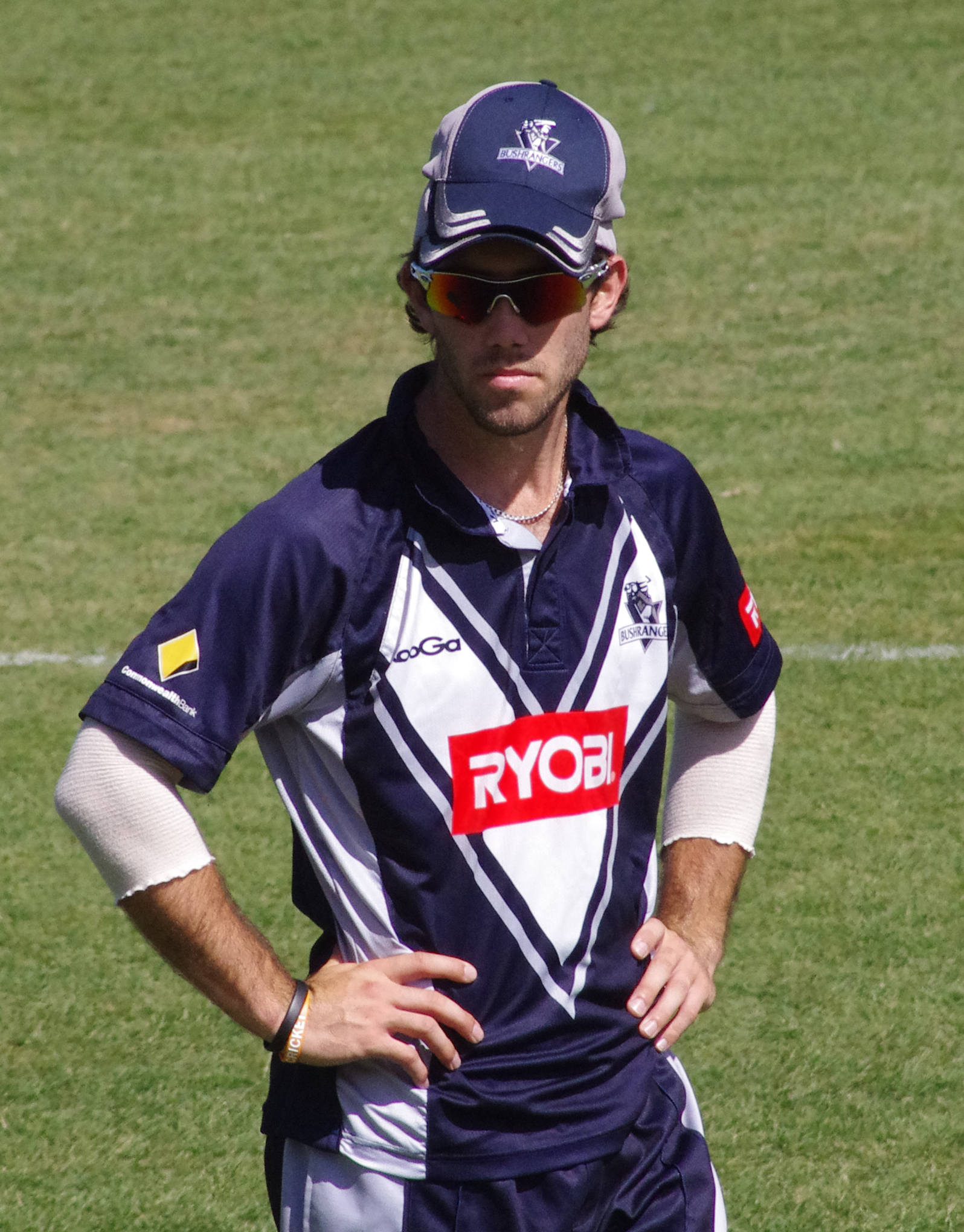
In the 2017 season, Maxwell scored 310 runs in 14 matches. His best year so far has been with KXIP in 2014, when he single-handedly took the KXIP to the final.

The Kings XI Punjab retained 14 players and released seven players. On 7 November 2019, KXIP traded Ravichandran Ashwin to Delhi Capitals for Rs 1.5 crore and Karnataka spinner Jagadeesha Suchith, ending a series of intense negotiations over the Indian spinner's IPL future. Later in the year they traded Ankit Rajpoot to Rajasthan Royals in return for Krishnappa Gowtham.

Retained
KL Rahul, Karun Nair, Mohammed Shami, Nicholas Pooran, Mujeeb ur Rahman, Chris Gayle, Mandeep Singh, Mayank Agarwal, Hardus Viljoen, Darshan Nalkande, Sarfaraz Khan, Arshdeep Singh, Harpreet Brar and Murugan Ashwin.

Released
Varun Chakravarthy, Andrew Tye, Sam Curran, Simran Singh, David Miller, Moises Henriques and Agnivesh Ayachi.

=== Auction ===
KXIP went in the auction with a purse of 42.70 Cr INR which was higher than any other team. KXIP had 16 players in front of the IPL 2020 Auction, and their significant hole was the all-rounders players. For that, KXIP purchased Glenn Maxwell for an incredible INR 1075L, and James Neesham and Deepak Hooda for just INR 50L. Their other costly purchases incorporate Sheldon Cottrell and Chris Jordan for INR 850L and INR 300L separately.

Players bought: Glenn Maxwell, Deepak Hooda, James Neesham, Prabhsimran Singh, Chris Jordan, Tanjinder Dhillon, Ravi Bishnoi, Ishan Porel, Sheldon Cottrell.

=== Team Analysis ===
ESPNcricinfo' wrote "Kings XI Punjab ensured that their playing eleven was completed by purchasing Glenn Maxwell and Sheldon Cottrell. On paper, this team's potential playing eleven looks very strong. The weak side of this team is its bench strength and bowling attack. Though Punjab had a lot of money left and the team could buy more players, but the team did not do so. The team also had the option of buying an opener as a backup for Gayle. Or by bidding higher for Chris Morris in the auction, the team could have added him as well."

== Indian Premier League ==
On 20 September, the Kings XI started their season campaign. KL Rahul, the kings' new captain, elected to field first. This thrilling match ended in a tie. Delhi started with a win in the tournament, defeating Punjab's team in the Super Over. Delhi scored 157-run with the loss of 8 wickets in 20 overs. Team had lost early wickets, but Marcus Stoinis"s brilliant innings helped the Delhi Capitals to build a 157-run target. In response to 158 runs, Punjab also scored 157-run in 20 overs on Mayank Agarwal's knock of 89 runs.

On 24 September, Kings XI Punjab won their first match of the season defeating Royal Challengers Banglore by 97-run. KL Rahul lost the toss and was put to bat. Rahul and Mayank Agarwal build the Kings XI innings with a 57-run stand for the first wicket. Rahul scored 132 off 69 balls with 14 fours and 7 sixes and helped the Kings XI finish the innings at 206/3 in 20 overs. Chasing a target of 207, the Royal Challengers had lost three wickets in a first four overs. Kings XI new ball pair of Sheldon Cottrell and Mohammed Shami continued their good work from the first match and Royal Challengers were eventually bowled out for 109. Rahul became the fastest Indian batsman to complete 2000 runs in IPL. However, they were ousted against Rajasthan Royals who successfully chased down 223 and then continued to lose five matches.The losing streak was broken when Punjab defeated Bangalore for 2nd time and then defeated Mumbai Indians in the Super Over and continued to win three more matches against Delhi, Hyderabad and Kolkata. However, they lost two matches at the end of the tournament.Their last match was against Chennai Super Kings who won comprehensively by 9 wickets, therefore knocking Punjab out of the tournament.

=== Preseason ===
In February 2020, KPH Dream Cricket Private Limited announced they had purchased the Caribbean Premier League team St Lucia Zouks. They became the second owners of IPL to run a CPL team, the first one is Red Chillies Entertainment, who own both Kolkata Knight Riders and Trinbago Knight Riders.

=== offseason ===
On 13 March 2020, the BCCI postponed the tournament until 15 April, in view of the ongoing coronavirus pandemic. On 14 April 2020, Narendra Modi said that the lockdown in India would last until at least 3 May 2020, with the tournament postponed further. The following day, the BCCI suspended the tournament indefinitely due to the pandemic.

On 17 May 2020, the Indian government relaxed nation-wide restrictions on sports events, allowing events to take place behind closed doors. On 24 May, Indian sports minister Kiren Rijiju stated that the decision on whether or not to allow the tournament to be conducted in 2020 will be made by the Indian government based on "the situation of the pandemic". In June 2020, the BCCI confirmed that their preference was to host the tournament in India, possibly between September and October. On 24 July 2020, it was confirmed that the tournament would start from 19 September 2020.

== Squad ==
- Players with international caps are listed in **bold**.

No.	Name	Nationality	Birth date	Batting style	Bowling style	Year signed	Salary	Notes
Batsmen
6	**Karun Nair**	India	6 December 1991 (aged 28)	Right-handed	Right-arm off break	2018	₹5.6 crore (US$580,000)	
333	**Chris Gayle**	Jamaica	21 September 1979 (aged 40)	Left-handed	Right-arm off break	2018	₹2 crore (US$210,000)	Overseas
16	**Mayank Agarwal**	India	16 February 1991 (aged 29)	Right-handed	Right-arm off break	2018	₹1 crore (US$100,000)	Vice Captain
18	**Mandeep Singh**	India	18 December 1991 (aged 28)	Right-handed	Right-arm medium	2019	₹1.4 crore (US$150,000)	
97	Sarfaraz Khan	India	27 October 1997 (aged 22)	Right-handed	Right-arm leg break	2019	₹25 lakh (US$26,000)	
57	Deepak Hooda	India	19 April 1995 (aged 25)	Right-handed	Right-arm off break	2020	₹50 lakh (US$52,000)	
All-rounders
32	**Glenn Maxwell**	Australia	14 October 1988 (aged 31)	Right-handed	Right-arm off break	2020	₹10.75 crore (US$1.1 million)	Overseas Captain
50	**James Neesham**	New Zealand	17 September 1990 (aged 30)	Left-handed	Right-arm fast-medium	2020	₹50 lakh (US$52,000)	Overseas
—N/a	Tajinder Singh	India	25 May 1992 (aged 28)	Right-handed	Right-arm off break	2020	₹20 lakh (US$21,000)	
Wicket-keepers
1	**K. L. Rahul**	India	18 April 1992 (aged 28)	Right-handed		2018	₹11 crore (US$1.1 million)	
29	**Nicholas Pooran**	Trinidad and Tobago	2 October 1995 (aged 24)	Left-handed		2019	₹4.2 crore (US$440,000)	Overseas
84	Prabhsimran Singh	India	19 April 1995 (aged 25)	Right-handed		2020	₹55 lakh (US$57,000)	
Spin Bowlers
88	**Mujeeb Ur Rahman**	Afghanistan	28 March 2001 (aged 19)	Right-handed	Right-arm off break	2018	₹4 crore (US$420,000)	Overseas
89	Murugan Ashwin	India	8 September 1990 (aged 30)	Right-handed	Right-arm leg break	2019	₹20 lakh (US$21,000)	
95	Harpreet Brar	India	16 September 1995 (aged 25)	Left-handed	Slow left-arm orthodox	2019	₹20 lakh (US$21,000)	
25	Krishnappa Gowtham	India	20 October 1988 (aged 31)	Right-handed	Right-arm off break	2020	₹6.2 crore (US$644,000)	
27	Jagadeesha Suchith	India	16 January 1994 (aged 26)	Left-handed	Slow left-arm orthodox	2020	₹20 lakh (US$21,000)	
56	Ravi Bishnoi	India	5 September 2000 (aged 20)	Right-handed	Right-arm leg break	2020	₹2 crore (US$210,000)	
Pace Bowlers
11	**Mohammed Shami**	India	3 September 1990 (aged 30)	Right-handed	Right-arm fast-medium	2019	₹4.8 crore (US$500,000)	
7	**Hardus Viljoen**	South Africa	6 March 1989 (aged 31)	Right-handed	Right-arm fast	2019	₹75 lakh (US$78,000)	Overseas
—N/a	Darshan Nalkande	India	4 October 1998 (aged 21)	Right-handed	Right-arm medium-fast	2019	₹30 lakh (US$31,000)	
2	Arshdeep Singh	India	5 February 1999 (aged 21)	Left-handed	Left-arm medium-fast	2019	₹20 lakh (US$21,000)	
19	**Sheldon Cottrell**	Jamaica	19 August 1989 (aged 31)	Right-handed	Left-arm fast-medium	2020	₹8.5 crore (US$880,000)	Overseas
34	**Chris Jordan**	England	4 October 1988 (aged 31)	Right-handed	Right-arm fast-medium	2020	₹3 crore (US$311,527.50)	Overseas
—N/a	Ishan Porel	India	5 September 1998 (aged 22)	Right-handed	Right-arm fast-medium	2020	₹20 lakh (US$21,000)	

== Administration and support staff ==
Position	Name
Owner	Mohit Burman (Dabur); Ness Wadia (Wadia Group); Priety Zinta (PZNZ Media); Karan Paul (Apeejay Surrendra Group)
CEO	Satish Menon
Team manager	Avinash Vaidya
Brand ambassador	Priety Zinta
Director of cricket operations and head coach	Anil Kumble
Assistant coach	Andy Flower
Batting coach	Wasim Jaffer
Bowling coach	Charl Langeveldt
Fielding coach	Jonty Rhodes
Team physio	Andrew Leipus
Trainer	Adrian Le Roux
Team doctor	Dr Srinand Srinivas

== Kit manufacturers and sponsors ==
Kit manufacturer	Shirt sponsor (chest)	Shirt sponsor (back)	Chest Branding
T10 Sports	Ebix Cash	Avon Cycles	Jio
Source :

T20 uniform

== Teams and standings ==
=== Results by match ===
Round	1	2	3	4	5	6	7	8	9	10	11	12	13	14
Result	L	W	L	L	L	L	L	W	W	W	W	W	L	L
Position	7	1	3	6	8	8	8	8	6	5	5	4	4	5

Source: Fixtures
W = Win; D = Draw; L = Loss

=== League table ===
Pos	Team	Pld	W	L	NR	Pts	NRR	Qualification
1	Mumbai Indians (C)	14	9	5	0	18	1.107	Advance to Qualifier 1
2	Delhi Capitals (R)	14	8	6	0	16	−0.109	Advance to Qualifier 1
3	Sunrisers Hyderabad (3rd)	14	7	7	0	14	0.608	Advance to Eliminator
4	Royal Challengers Bangalore (4th)	14	7	7	0	14	−0.172	Advance to Eliminator
5	Kolkata Knight Riders	14	7	7	0	14	−0.214	
6	Kings XI Punjab	14	6	8	0	12	−0.162	
7	Chennai Super Kings	14	6	8	0	12	−0.455	
8	Rajasthan Royals	14	6	8	0	12	−0.569	

Source: IPLT20.com
The four top ranked teams qualify for the playoffs.

==== League stage ====
20 September 2020
19:30 (D/N)
Scorecard

Delhi Capitals; 157/8 (20 overs)	v	Kings XI Punjab; 157/8 (20 overs)
Marcus Stoinis 53 (21); Mohammed Shami 3/15 (4 overs)		Mayank Agarwal 89 (60); Ravichandran Ashwin 2/2 (1 over)

Match tied
(Delhi Capitals won the Super Over)
Dubai International Cricket Stadium, Dubai
Umpires: Anil Chaudhary (Ind) and Nitin Menon (Ind)
Player of the match: Marcus Stoinis (Delhi Capitals)

- Kings XI Punjab won the toss and elected to field.
- Super Over: Kings XI Punjab 2/2 (1 over), Delhi Capitals 3/0 (0.2 overs)

24 September 2020
19:30 (D/N)
Scorecard

Kings XI Punjab; 206/3 (20 overs)	v	Royal Challengers Bangalore; 109 (17 overs)
K. L. Rahul 132* (69); Shivam Dube 2/33 (3 overs)		Washington Sundar 30 (27); Murugan Ashwin 3/21 (3 overs)

Kings XI Punjab won by 97 runs
Dubai International Cricket Stadium, Dubai
Umpires: Anil Chaudhary (Ind) and Paul Reiffel (Aus)
Player of the match: K. L. Rahul (Kings XI Punjab)

- Royal Challengers Bangalore won the toss and elected to field.
- K. L. Rahul (Kings XI Punjab) scored the highest total by an Indian batsman in the IPL, and the highest total by a team captain in the IPL.

27 September 2020
19:30 (D/N)
Scorecard

Kings XI Punjab; 223/2 (20 overs)	v	Rajasthan Royals; 226/6 (19.3 overs)
Mayank Agarwal 106 (50); Ankit Rajpoot 1/39 (4 overs)		Sanju Samson 85 (42); Mohammed Shami 3/53 (4 overs)

Rajasthan Royals won by 4 wickets
Sharjah Cricket Stadium, Sharjah
Umpires: Richard Illingworth (Eng) and Krishnamachari Srinivasan (Ind)
Player of the match: Sanju Samson (Rajasthan Royals)

- Rajasthan Royals won the toss and elected to field.
- Rajasthan Royals made the highest successful run-chase in Indian Premier League history.

1 October 2020
19:30 (D/N)
Scorecard

Mumbai Indians; 191/4 (20 overs)	v	Kings XI Punjab; 143/8 (20 overs)
Rohit Sharma 70 (45); Sheldon Cottrell 1/20 (4 overs)		Nicholas Pooran 44 (27); Jasprit Bumrah 2/18 (4 overs)

Mumbai Indians won by 48 runs
Sheikh Zayed Cricket Stadium, Abu Dhabi
Umpires: Sundaram Ravi (Ind) and Virender Sharma (Ind)
Player of the match: Kieron Pollard (Mumbai Indians)

- Kings XI Punjab won the toss and elected to field.
- Rohit Sharma (Mumbai Indians) became the third player to reach 5,000 IPL runs.

4 October 2020
19:30 (D/N)
Scorecard

Kings XI Punjab; 178/4 (20 overs)	v	Chennai Super Kings; 181/0 (17.4 overs)
K. L. Rahul 63 (52); Shardul Thakur 2/39 (4 overs)		Faf du Plessis 87* (53)

Chennai Super Kings won by 10 wickets
Dubai International Cricket Stadium, Dubai
Umpires: Anil Dandekar (Ind) and Nitin Menon (Ind)
Player of the match: Shane Watson (Chennai Super Kings)

- Kings XI Punjab won the toss and elected to bat.

8 October 2020
19:30 (D/N)
Scorecard

Sunrisers Hyderabad; 201/6 (20 overs)	v	Kings XI Punjab; 132 (16.5 overs)
Jonny Bairstow 97 (55); Ravi Bishnoi 3/29 (3 overs)		Nicholas Pooran 77 (37); Rashid Khan 3/12 (4 overs)

Sunrisers Hyderabad won by 69 runs
Dubai International Cricket Stadium, Dubai
Umpires: Anil Chaudhary (Ind) and Nitin Menon (Ind)
Player of the match: Jonny Bairstow (Sunrisers Hyderabad)

- Sunrisers Hyderabad won the toss and elected to bat.

10 October 2020
15:30
Scorecard

Kolkata Knight Riders; 164/6 (20 overs)	v	Kings XI Punjab; 162/5 (20 overs)
Dinesh Karthik 58 (29); Ravi Bishnoi 1/25 (4 overs); Arshdeep Singh 1/25 (4 overs)		K. L. Rahul 74 (58); Prasidh Krishna 3/29 (4 overs)

Kolkata Knight Riders won by 2 runs
Sheikh Zayed Cricket Stadium, Abu Dhabi
Umpires: Chris Gaffaney (NZ) and Ulhas Gandhe (Ind)
Player of the match: Dinesh Karthik (Kolkata Knight Riders)

- Kolkata Knight Riders won the toss and elected to bat.

15 October 2020
19:30 (D/N)
Scorecard

Royal Challengers Bangalore; 171/6 (20 overs)	v	Kings XI Punjab; 177/2 (20 overs)
Virat Kohli 48 (39); Murugan Ashwin 2/23 (4 overs)		K. L. Rahul 61* (49); Yuzvendra Chahal 1/35 (3 overs)

Kings XI Punjab won by 8 wickets
Sharjah Cricket Stadium, Sharjah
Umpires: K. N. Ananthapadmanabhan (Ind) and Chettithody Shamshuddin (Ind)
Player of the match: K. L. Rahul (Kings XI Punjab)

- Royal Challengers Bangalore won the toss and elected to bat.

18 October 2020
19:30 (D/N)
Scorecard

Mumbai Indians; 176/6 (20 overs)	v	Kings XI Punjab; 176/6 (20 overs)
Quinton de Kock 53 (43); Mohammed Shami 2/30 (4 overs)		K. L. Rahul 77 (51); Jasprit Bumrah 3/24 (4 overs)

Match tied and Super Over tied
(Kings XI Punjab won the second Super Over)
Dubai International Cricket Stadium, Dubai
Umpires: Nitin Menon (Ind) and Paul Reiffel (Aus)
Player of the match: K. L. Rahul (Kings XI Punjab)

- Mumbai Indians won the toss and elected to bat.
- Super Over 1: Kings XI Punjab 5/2 (1 over), Mumbai Indians 5/1 (1 over) - Tied.
- Super Over 2: Mumbai Indians 11/1 (1 over), Kings XI Punjab 15/0 (0.4 overs)

20 October 2020
19:30 (D/N)
Scorecard

Delhi Capitals; 164/5 (20 overs)	v	Kings XI Punjab; 167/5 (19 overs)
Shikhar Dhawan 106* (61); Mohammed Shami 2/28 (4 overs)		Nicholas Pooran 53 (28); Kagiso Rabada 2/27 (4 overs)

Kings XI Punjab won by 5 wickets
Dubai International Cricket Stadium, Dubai
Umpires: Richard Illingworth (Eng) and Chettithody Shamshuddin (Ind)
Player of the match: Shikhar Dhawan (Delhi Capitals)

- Delhi Capitals won the toss and elected to bat.
- Shikhar Dhawan (Delhi Capitals) became the fifth player overall and the fourth Indian to reach 5,000 IPL runs. He also became the first player to score two consecutive 100s in the IPL and became the fifth player to score multiple hundreds in a single season.

24 October 2020
19:30 (D/N)
Scorecard

Kings XI Punjab; 126/7 (20 overs)	v	Sunrisers Hyderabad; 114 (19.5 overs)
Nicholas Pooran 32* (28); Rashid Khan 2/14 (4 overs)		David Warner 35 (20); Chris Jordan 3/17 (4 overs)

Kings XI Punjab won by 12 runs
Dubai International Cricket Stadium, Dubai
Umpires: Anil Dandekar (Ind) and Paul Reiffel (Aus)
Player of the match: Chris Jordan (Kings XI Punjab)

- Sunrisers Hyderabad won the toss and elected to field.

26 October 2020
19:30 (D/N)
Scorecard

Kolkata Knight Riders; 149/9 (20 overs)	v	Kings XI Punjab; 150/2 (18.5 overs)
Shubman Gill 57 (45); Mohammed Shami 3/35 (4 overs)		Mandeep Singh 66* (56); Lockie Ferguson 1/32 (3.5 overs)

Kings XI Punjab won by 8 wickets
Sharjah Cricket Stadium, Sharjah
Umpires: K. N. Ananthapadmanabhan (Ind) and Richard Illingworth (Eng)
Player of the match: Chris Gayle (Kings XI Punjab)

- Kings XI Punjab won the toss and elected to field.

30 October 2020
19:30 (D/N)
Scorecard

Kings XI Punjab; 185/4 (20 overs)	v	Rajasthan Royals; 186/3 (17.3 overs)
Chris Gayle 99 (63); Jofra Archer 2/26 (4 overs)		Ben Stokes 50 (26); Murugan Ashwin 1/43 (4 overs)

Rajasthan Royals won by 7 wickets
Sheikh Zayed Cricket Stadium, Abu Dhabi
Umpires: Chris Gaffaney (NZ) and Sundaram Ravi (Ind)
Player of the match: Ben Stokes (Rajasthan Royals)

- Rajasthan Royals won the toss and elected to field.
- Chris Gayle (Kings XI Punjab) became the first player to hit 1,000 sixes in T20 cricket.

1 November 2020
15:30
Scorecard

Kings XI Punjab; 153/6 (20 overs)	v	Chennai Super Kings; 154/1 (18.5 overs)
Deepak Hooda 62* (30); Lungi Ngidi 3/39 (4 overs)		Ruturaj Gaikwad 62* (49); Chris Jordan 1/31 (3 overs)

Chennai Super Kings won by 9 wickets
Sheikh Zayed Cricket Stadium, Abu Dhabi
Umpires: Pashchim Pathak (Ind) and Virender Sharma (Ind)
Player of the match: Ruturaj Gaikwad (Chennai Super Kings)

- Chennai Super Kings won the toss and elected to field.
- Kings XI Punjab were eliminated as a result of this match.

== Statistics ==
=== Most runs ===
No.	Name	Match	Inns	NO	Runs	HS	Ave.	BF	SR	100s	50s	4s	6s
1	K. L. Rahul	14	14	2	670	132*	55.83	518	129.34	1	5	58	23
2	Mayank Agarwal	11	11	0	424	106	38.54	271	156.45	1	2	44	15
3	Nicholas Pooran	14	14	4	353	77	35.30	208	169.71	0	2	23	25
4	Chris Gayle	7	7	0	288	99	41.14	210	137.14	0	3	15	23
5	Mandeep Singh	7	7	1	130	66*	21.66	109	119.26	0	1	10	4

- Source: ESPNcricinfo

=== Most wickets ===
No.	Name	Match	Inns	Overs	Runs	Maiden	Wickets	BBI	Ave.	Econ.	SR	4W	5W
1	Mohammed Shami	14	14	53.4	460	0	20	3/15	23.00	8.57	16.1	0	0
2	Ravi Bishnoi	14	14	51.0	376	1	12	3/29	31.33	7.37	25.5	0	0
3	Murugan Ashwin	9	9	31.3	235	0	10	3/21	23.50	7.46	18.9	0	0
4	Arshdeep Singh	8	8	24.5	218	1	9	3/23	24.22	8.77	16.55	0	0
5	Chris Jordan	9	9	31.3	304	0	9	3/17	33.77	9.65	21.0	0	0

- Source: ESPNcricinfo

== Player of the match awards ==
No.	Date	Player	Opponent	Result	Contribution	Ref.
1	24 September 2020	KL Rahul	Royal Challengers Bangalore	Won by 97 runs	132* (69)	
2	15 October 2020	KL Rahul	Royal Challengers Bangalore	Won by 8 wickets	61* (49)	
3	18 October 2020	KL Rahul	Mumbai Indians	Won the second super over	77 (51)	
4	24 October 2020	Chris Jordan	Sunrisers Hyderabad	Won by 12 runs	3/17 (4 overs)	
5	26 October 2020	Chris Gayle	Kolkata Knight Riders	Won by 8 wickets	51 (29)	
