= 2020 Delhi Capitals season =

Indian Twenty20 franchise cricket team

Delhi Capitals
2020 season
- Coach: Ricky Ponting
- Captain: Shreyas Iyer
- Ground(s): Dubai International Stadium, Dubai
- Most runs: Shikhar Dhawan (618 runs)
- Most wickets: Kagiso Rabada (30 wickets)

Delhi Capitals is a Twenty20 franchise cricket team based in Delhi, India. The team plays in the Indian Premier League and competed in the 2020 edition between September and November 2020.

Founded in 2008 as the Delhi Daredevils, the franchise is owned by the GMR Group and the JSW Group. The team's home ground is Arun Jaitley Stadium, located in New Delhi. Delhi capitals Delhi Capitals qualified for the finals first time in IPL 2020 after twelve years of the start of this tournament, and qualified for the IPL playoffs in 2019 for the first time in seven years. But they lost to Mumbai Indians in the final by 5 wickets and finished as runners up.

== Background ==
=== Player retention and transfers ===
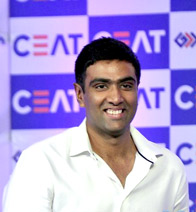
Ashwin was traded in from Kings XI Punjab in exchange for Jagadeesha Suchith.

Retained players: Shreyas Iyer, Rishabh Pant, Prithvi Shaw, Amit Mishra, Avesh Khan, Harshal Patel, Shikhar Dhawan, Ishant Sharma, Axar Patel, Kagiso Rabada, Sandeep Lamichhane and Keemo Paul.

Released players: Colin Ingram, Colin Munro, Manjot Kalra, Hanuma Vihari, Chris Morris, Jalaj Saxena, Ankush Bains, Nathu Singh and Bandaru Ayyappa.

Traded In: Ravichandran Ashwin and Ajinkya Rahane

Traded Out: Sherfane Rutherford, Trent Boult and Rahul Tewatia

Replacement players: Praveen Dubey

=== Auction ===
The Capitals went into the auction with a purse of 27.85 Cr INR. Delhi Capitals retained 14 players and bought 8 players in the IPL Auction 2020. Their best purchases were Shimron Hetmyer for INR 775L and Marcus Stoinis for INR 480L. They were fortunate to get the services of Jason Roy and Chris Woakes at their base price. In addition to that, Delhi Capitals got Alex Carey for 240L INR.

Players bought: Jason Roy, Alex Carey, Shimron Hetmyer, Chris Woakes, Marcus Stoinis, Lalit Yadav, Tushar Deshpande, Mohit Sharma.

=== Team analysis ===
ESPNcricinfo' wrote The team of Delhi Capitals wanted to buy Eoin Morgan, Glenn Maxwell, Sam Curran, Pat Cummins and Jaydev Unadkat in the auction, but this could not happen. In such a situation, the team had to turn to other options. The team used their limited resources to dominate the home ground. No batsman of the team could bowl. However, the franchise did a good job by buying Hetmyer and Alex Carey.

== Indian Premier League ==
On 20 September, the Delhi started with a win in the tournament, defeating Punjab's team in the super over. This thrilling match ended in a tie. Shreyas Iyer lost the toss and was put to bat. Delhi scored 157-run with the loss of 8 wickets in 20 overs. Team had lost early wickets, but Marcus Stoinis brilliant inning helped the Delhi to build a 157-run target. In response to 158 runs, Punjab also scored 157-run in 20 overs on Mayank Agarwal's knock of 89 runs.

On 25 September, the Delhi Capitals enjoyed their second successive win, defeating Chennai Super Kings by 44-run. Shreyas Iyer lost the toss and was put to bat. Prithvi Shaw (64 off 43 balls) got the support from Shikhar Dhawan (35 off 27 balls) to build a 94-run partnership for first wicket and helped the Capitals finish the innings with 175/3 in their 20 overs. Chasing the target of 176, Super Kings got off to a poor start as they lost both their openers quickly, but Faf du Plessis (43 off 35 balls) and Kedar Jadhav stitched a partnership to keep Super Kings hopes, but their team managed only 131/7 in 20 overs.

On 14 October, during the 30th match of IPL against Rajasthan royals Anrich Nortje bowled the fastest ball (156.22 km/h)and he also bowled out Jos Buttler.

After winning 7 out of 9 games, Delhi were placed at the top of the table with 14 points. However, they lost 4 consecutive games after it which rendered them vulnerable to be knocked out of the tournament. A victory in their final league stage match against Royal Challengers Bangalore ensured them a place in the playoffs. They reached the Qualifier 1 where they lost to Mumbai Indians by 57 runs.Then they won the Qualifier 2 against Sunrisers Hyderabad with Marcus Stoinis taking 3 wickets and scored 38 runs.Delhi reached their first final and played against Mumbai Indians.Mumbai Indians won comfortably by 5 wickets to win their fifth title.At the end of the season, Rabada was awarded the Purple Cap for taking 30 wickets.

== Squad ==
- Players with international caps are listed in **bold**.

No.	Name	Nationality	Birth date	Batting style	Bowling style	Year signed	Salary	Notes
Batsmen
41	**Shreyas Iyer**	India	6 December 1994 (aged 25)	Right-handed	Right-arm leg break	2018	₹7 crore (US$730,000)	Captain
100	**Prithvi Shaw**	India	9 November 1999 (aged 20)	Right-handed	Right-arm off break	2018	₹1.2 crore (US$120,000)	
42	**Shikhar Dhawan**	India	5 December 1985 (aged 34)	Left-handed	Right-arm off break	2019	₹5.2 crore (US$540,000)	
3	**Ajinkya Rahane**	India	5 June 1988 (aged 32)	Right-handed	Right-arm medium	2020	₹4 crore (US$415,000)	
189	**Shimron Hetmyer**	West Indies	26 December 1996 (aged 23)	Left-handed	Right-arm leg break	2020	₹7.75 crore (US$800,000)	Overseas
–	**Jason Roy**	England	21 July 1990 (aged 30)	Right-handed	Right-arm medium	2020	₹1.5 crore (US$156,000)	Overseas
All-rounders
21	**Marcus Stoinis**	Australia	16 August 1989 (aged 31)	Right-handed	Right-arm medium	2020	₹4.8 crore (US$500,000)	Overseas
20	**Axar Patel**	India	20 January 1994 (aged 26)	Left-handed	Left-arm orthodox	2019	₹5 crore (US$520,000)	
60	Daniel Sams	Australia	27 October 1997 (aged 22)	Right-handed	Left-arm fast-medium	2020	₹20 lakh (US$21,000)	Overseas
16	Lalit Yadav	India	3 January 1997 (aged 23)	Right-handed	Right-arm off break	2020	₹20 lakh (US$21,000)	
84	**Keemo Paul**	West Indies	21 February 1998 (aged 22)	Right-handed	Right-arm fast-medium	2019	₹50 lakh (US$52,000)	Overseas
Wicket-keepers
17	**Rishabh Pant**	India	4 October 1997 (aged 22)	Left-handed	Right-arm medium	2018	₹8 crore (US$830,000)	Vice Captain
5	**Alex Carey**	Australia	27 August 1991 (aged 29)	Left-handed	Right-arm medium	2020	₹2.4 crore (US$250,000)	Overseas
Spin Bowlers
99	**Amit Mishra**	India	24 November 1982 (aged 37)	Right-handed	Right-arm leg break	2018	₹4 crore (US$420,000)	
1	**Sandeep Lamichhane**	Nepal	2 August 2000 (aged 20)	Right-handed	Right-arm leg break	2018	₹20 lakh (US$21,000)	Overseas
23	**Ravichandran Ashwin**	India	17 September 1986 (aged 34)	Right-handed	Right-arm off break	2020	₹7.6 crore (US$790,000)	
46	Praveen Dubey	India	1 July 1993 (aged 27)	Right-handed	Right-arm leg break	2020	₹20 lakh (US$21,000)	Replacement for Amit Mishra
Pace Bowlers
25	**Kagiso Rabada**	South Africa	25 May 1995 (aged 25)	Left-handed	Right-arm fast	2018	₹4.2 crore (US$440,000)	Overseas
02	**Anrich Nortje**	South Africa	16 November 1993 (aged 26)	Right-handed	Right-arm fast-medium	2020	₹50 lakh (US$52,000)	Overseas
6	Avesh Khan	India	13 December 1996 (aged 23)	Right-handed	Right-arm fast-medium	2018	₹70 lakh (US$73,000)	
13	Harshal Patel	India	23 November 1990 (aged 29)	Right-handed	Right-arm medium-fast	2018	₹20 lakh (US$21,000)	
18	**Mohit Sharma**	India	18 September 1988 (aged 32)	Right-handed	Right-arm fast-medium	2020	₹50 lakh (US$52,000)	
97	**Ishant Sharma**	India	2 September 1988 (aged 32)	Right-handed	Right-arm fast-medium	2019	₹1.1 crore (US$110,000)	
–	**Chris Woakes**	England	2 March 1989 (aged 31)	Right-handed	Right-arm fast-medium	2020	₹1.5 crore (US$160,000)	Overseas
96	Tushar Deshpande	India	15 May 1995 (aged 25)	Right-handed	Right-arm fast-medium	2020	₹20 lakh (US$21,000)	

== Administration and support staff ==
Position	Name
CEO	Dhiraj Malhotra
Head coach	Ricky Ponting
Assistant coach	Mohammad Kaif
Spin bowling coach	Samuel Badree
Fast bowling coach	Ryan Harris
Physiotherapist	Patrick Farhart
Strength and conditioning coach	Rajinikanth Sivagnanam

== Kit manufacturers and sponsors ==
Kit manufacturer	Shirt sponsor (chest)	Shirt sponsor (back)	Chest Branding
SquadGear	JSW	EbixCash	APL Apollo Steel Tubes
Source :

T20 uniform

== Teams and standings ==
=== Results by match ===
Round	1	2	3	4	5	6	7	8	9	10	11	12	13	14
Result	W	W	L	W	W	W	L	W	W	L	L	L	L	W
Position	2	1	2	1	1	1	2	1	1	1	2	3	3	2

Source: Fixtures
W = Win; D = Draw; L = Loss

=== League table ===
Pos	Team	Pld	W	L	NR	Pts	NRR	Qualification
1	Mumbai Indians (C)	14	9	5	0	18	1.107	Advance to Qualifier 1
2	Delhi Capitals (R)	14	8	6	0	16	−0.109	Advance to Qualifier 1
3	Sunrisers Hyderabad (3rd)	14	7	7	0	14	0.608	Advance to Eliminator
4	Royal Challengers Bangalore (4th)	14	7	7	0	14	−0.172	Advance to Eliminator
5	Kolkata Knight Riders	14	7	7	0	14	−0.214	
6	Kings XI Punjab	14	6	8	0	12	−0.162	
7	Chennai Super Kings	14	6	8	0	12	−0.455	
8	Rajasthan Royals	14	6	8	0	12	−0.569	

Source: IPLT20.com
The four top ranked teams qualify for the playoffs.

==== League stage ====
20 September 2020
19:30 (D/N)
Scorecard

Delhi Capitals; 157/8 (20 overs)	v	Kings XI Punjab; 157/8 (20 overs)
Marcus Stoinis 53 (21); Mohammed Shami 3/15 (4 overs)		Mayank Agarwal 89 (60); Ravichandran Ashwin 2/2 (1 over)

Match tied
(Delhi Capitals won the Super Over)
Dubai International Cricket Stadium, Dubai
Umpires: Anil Chaudhary (Ind) and Nitin Menon (Ind)
Player of the match: Marcus Stoinis (Delhi Capitals)

- Kings XI Punjab won the toss and elected to field.
- Super Over: Kings XI Punjab 2/2 (1 over), Delhi Capitals 3/0 (0.2 overs)

25 September 2020
19:30 (D/N)
Scorecard

Delhi Capitals; 175/3 (20 overs)	v	Chennai Super Kings; 131/7 (20 overs)
Prithvi Shaw 64 (43); Piyush Chawla 2/33 (4 overs)		Faf du Plessis 43 (35); Kagiso Rabada 3/26 (4 overs)

Delhi Capitals won by 44 runs
Dubai International Cricket Stadium, Dubai
Umpires: K. N. Ananthapadmanabhan (Ind) and Richard Illingworth (Eng)
Player of the match: Prithvi Shaw (Delhi Capitals)

- Chennai Super Kings won the toss and elected to field.

29 September 2020
19:30 (D/N)
Scorecard

Sunrisers Hyderabad; 162/4 (20 overs)	v	Delhi Capitals; 147/7 (20 overs)
Jonny Bairstow 53 (48); Kagiso Rabada 2/21 (4 overs)		Shikhar Dhawan 34 (31); Rashid Khan 3/14 (4 overs)

Sunrisers Hyderabad won by 15 runs
Sheikh Zayed Cricket Stadium, Abu Dhabi
Umpires: Sundaram Ravi (Ind) and Virender Sharma (Ind)
Player of the match: Rashid Khan (Sunrisers Hyderabad)

- Delhi Capitals won the toss and elected to field.

3 October 2020
19:30 (D/N)
Scorecard

Delhi Capitals; 228/4 (20 overs)	v	Kolkata Knight Riders; 210/8 (20 overs)
Shreyas Iyer 88* (38); Andre Russell 2/29 (4 overs)		Nitish Rana 58 (35); Anrich Nortje 3/33 (4 overs)

Delhi Capitals won by 18 runs
Sharjah Cricket Stadium, Sharjah
Umpires: Richard Illingworth (Eng) and Vineet Kulkarni (Ind)
Player of the match: Shreyas Iyer (Delhi Capitals)

- Kolkata Knight Riders won the toss and elected to field.

5 October 2020
19:30 (D/N)
Scorecard

Delhi Capitals; 196/4 (20 overs)	v	Royal Challengers Bangalore; 137/9 (20 overs)
Marcus Stoinis 53* (26); Mohammed Siraj 2/34 (4 overs)		Virat Kohli 43 (39); Kagiso Rabada 4/24 (4 overs)

Delhi Capitals won by 59 runs
Dubai International Cricket Stadium, Dubai
Umpires: Yeshwant Barde (Ind) and Nitin Menon (Ind)
Player of the match: Axar Patel (Delhi Capitals)

- Royal Challengers Bangalore won the toss and elected to field.
- Virat Kohli (Royal Challengers Bangalore) became the first Indian player to reach 9,000 T20 runs.

9 October 2020
19:30 (D/N)
Scorecard

Delhi Capitals; 184/8 (20 overs)	v	Rajasthan Royals; 138 (19.4 overs)
Shimron Hetmyer 45 (24); Jofra Archer 3/24 (4 overs)		Rahul Tewatia 38 (29); Kagiso Rabada 3/35 (3.4 overs)

Delhi Capitals won by 46 runs
Sharjah Cricket Stadium, Sharjah
Umpires: K. N. Ananthapadmanabhan (Ind) and Chettithody Shamshuddin (Ind)
Player of the match: Ravichandran Ashwin (Delhi Capitals)

- Rajasthan Royals won the toss and elected to field.

11 October 2020
19:30 (D/N)
Scorecard

Delhi Capitals; 162/4 (20 overs)	v	Mumbai Indians; 166/5 (19.4 overs)
Shikhar Dhawan 69* (52); Krunal Pandya 2/26 (4 overs)		Suryakumar Yadav 53 (32); Kagiso Rabada 2/28 (4 overs)

Mumbai Indians won by 5 wickets
Sheikh Zayed Cricket Stadium, Abu Dhabi
Umpires: Chris Gaffaney (NZ) and Sundaram Ravi (Ind)
Player of the match: Quinton de Kock (Mumbai Indians)

- Delhi Capitals won the toss and elected to bat.

14 October 2020
19:30 (D/N)
Scorecard

Delhi Capitals; 161/7 (20 overs)	v	Rajasthan Royals; 148/8 (20 overs)
Shikhar Dhawan 57 (33); Jofra Archer 3/19 (4 overs)		Ben Stokes 41 (35); Anrich Nortje 2/33 (4 overs)

Delhi Capitals won by 13 runs
Dubai International Cricket Stadium, Dubai
Umpires: Anil Chaudhary (Ind) and Nitin Menon (Ind)
Player of the match: Anrich Nortje (Delhi Capitals)

- Delhi Capitals won the toss and elected to bat.

17 October 2020
19:30 (D/N)
Scorecard

Chennai Super Kings; 179/4 (20 overs)	v	Delhi Capitals; 185/5 (19.5 overs)
Faf du Plessis 58 (47); Anrich Nortje 2/44 (4 overs)		Shikhar Dhawan 101* (58); Deepak Chahar 2/18 (4 overs)

Delhi Capitals won by 5 wickets
Sharjah Cricket Stadium, Sharjah
Umpires: K. N. Ananthapadmanabhan (Ind) and Richard Illingworth (Eng)
Player of the match: Shikhar Dhawan (Delhi Capitals)

- Chennai Super Kings won the toss and elected to bat.
- Shikhar Dhawan (Delhi Capitals) scored his first century in T20s.

20 October 2020
19:30 (D/N)
Scorecard

Delhi Capitals; 164/5 (20 overs)	v	Kings XI Punjab; 167/5 (19 overs)
Shikhar Dhawan 106* (61); Mohammed Shami 2/28 (4 overs)		Nicholas Pooran 53 (28); Kagiso Rabada 2/27 (4 overs)

Kings XI Punjab won by 5 wickets
Dubai International Cricket Stadium, Dubai
Umpires: Richard Illingworth (Eng) and Chettithody Shamshuddin (Ind)
Player of the match: Shikhar Dhawan (Delhi Capitals)

- Delhi Capitals won the toss and elected to bat.
- Shikhar Dhawan (Delhi Capitals) became the fifth player overall and the fourth Indian to reach 5,000 IPL runs. He also became the first player to score two consecutive 100s in the IPL and became the fifth player to score multiple hundreds in a single season.

24 October 2020
15:30
Scorecard

Kolkata Knight Riders; 194/6 (20 overs)	v	Delhi Capitals; 135/9 (20 overs)
Nitish Rana 81 (53); Anrich Nortje 2/27 (4 overs)		Shreyas Iyer 47 (38); Varun Chakravarthy 5/20 (4 overs)

Kolkata Knight Riders won by 59 runs
Sheikh Zayed Cricket Stadium, Abu Dhabi
Umpires: Chris Gaffaney (NZ) and Pashchim Pathak (Ind)
Player of the match: Varun Chakravarthy (Kolkata Knight Riders)

- Delhi Capitals won the toss and elected to field.

27 October 2020
19:30 (D/N)
Scorecard

Sunrisers Hyderabad; 219/2 (20 overs)	v	Delhi Capitals; 131 (19 overs)
Wriddhiman Saha 87 (45); Ravichandran Ashwin 1/35 (3 overs)		Rishabh Pant 36 (35); Rashid Khan 3/7 (4 overs)

Sunrisers Hyderabad won by 88 runs
Dubai International Cricket Stadium, Dubai
Umpires: Anil Chaudhary (Ind) and Nitin Menon (Ind)
Player of the match: Wriddhiman Saha (Sunrisers Hyderabad)

- Delhi Capitals won the toss and elected to field.

31 October 2020
15:30
Scorecard

Delhi Capitals; 110/9 (20 overs)	v	Mumbai Indians; 111/1 (14.2 overs)
Shreyas Iyer 25 (29); Jasprit Bumrah 3/17 (4 overs)		Ishan Kishan 72* (47); Anrich Nortje 1/25 (2.2 overs)

Mumbai Indians won by 9 wickets
Dubai International Cricket Stadium, Dubai
Umpires: Yeshwant Barde (Ind) and Paul Reiffel (Aus)
Player of the match: Ishan Kishan (Mumbai Indians)

- Mumbai Indians won the toss and elected to field.
- Mumbai Indians advanced to Qualifier 1 as a result of this match.

2 November 2020
19:30 (D/N)
Scorecard

Royal Challengers Bangalore; 152/7 (20 overs)	v	Delhi Capitals; 154/4 (19 overs)
Devdutt Padikkal 50 (41); Anrich Nortje 3/33 (4 overs)		Ajinkya Rahane 60 (46); Shahbaz Ahmed 2/26 (4 overs)

Delhi Capitals won by 6 wickets
Sheikh Zayed Cricket Stadium, Abu Dhabi
Umpires: Chris Gaffaney (NZ) and Sundaram Ravi (Ind)
Player of the match: Anrich Nortje (Delhi Capitals)

- Delhi Capitals won the toss and elected to field.
- Royal Challengers Bangalore qualified for the playoffs and Delhi Capitals advanced to Qualifier 1 as a result of this match.

== Playoffs ==
Qualifier 1

5 November 2020
19:30 (D/N)
Scorecard

Mumbai Indians; 200/5 (20 overs)	v	Delhi Capitals; 143/8 (20 overs)
Ishan Kishan 55* (30); Ravichandran Ashwin 3/29 (4 overs)		Marcus Stoinis 65 (46); Jasprit Bumrah 4/14 (4 overs)

Mumbai Indians won by 57 runs
Dubai International Cricket Stadium, Dubai
Umpires: Chris Gaffaney (NZ) and Nitin Menon (Ind)
Player of the match: Jasprit Bumrah (Mumbai Indians)

- Delhi Capitals won the toss and elected to field.

Qualifier 2

8 November 2020
19:30 (D/N)
Scorecard

Delhi Capitals; 189/3 (20 overs)	v	Sunrisers Hyderabad; 172/8 (20 overs)
Shikhar Dhawan 78 (50); Rashid Khan 1/26 (4 overs)		Kane Williamson 67 (45); Kagiso Rabada 4/29 (4 overs)

Delhi Capitals won by 17 runs
Sheikh Zayed Cricket Stadium, Abu Dhabi
Umpires: Sundaram Ravi (Ind) and Paul Reiffel (Aus)
Player of the match: Marcus Stoinis (Delhi Capitals)

- Delhi Capitals won the toss and elected to bat.

Final

10 November 2020
19:30 (D/N)
Scorecard

Delhi Capitals; 156/7 (20 overs)	v	Mumbai Indians; 157/5 (18.4 overs)
Shreyas Iyer 65* (50); Trent Boult 3/30 (4 overs)		Rohit Sharma 68 (51); Anrich Nortje 2/25 (2.4 overs)

Mumbai Indians won by 5 wickets
Dubai International Cricket Stadium, Dubai
Umpires: Chris Gaffaney (NZ) and Nitin Menon (Ind)
Player of the match: Trent Boult (Mumbai Indians)

- Delhi Capitals won the toss and elected to bat.
- This was the fifth IPL title for the Mumbai Indians and they became the second team to win consecutive IPL trophies after Chennai Super Kings in 2010 and 2011.

== Statistics ==
=== Most runs ===
No.	Name	Match	Inns	NO	Runs	HS	Ave.	BF	SR	100s	50s	0s	4s	6s
1	Shikar Dhawan	17	17	3	618	106*	44.14	427	144.73	2	4	4	67	12
2	Shreyas Iyer	17	17	2	519	88*	34.60	421	123.27	0	3	0	40	16
3	Marcus Stoinis	17	17	3	352	65	25.14	237	148.52	0	3	1	31	16
4	Rishabh Pant	14	14	3	343	56	31.18	301	113.95	0	1	0	31	9
5	Prithvi Shaw	13	13	0	228	66	17.53	167	136.52	0	2	3	27	8

- Source: ESPNcricinfo

=== Most wickets ===
No.	Name	Match	Inns	Overs	Maidens	Runs	Wickets	BBI	Ave.	Econ.	SR	4W	5W
1	Kagiso Rabada	17	17	65.4	1	548	30	4/24	18.26	8.34	13.1	2	0
2	Anrich Nortje	16	16	61	0	512	22	3/33	23.27	8.39	16.6	0	0
3	Marcus Stoinis	17	13	29.4	0	283	13	3/26	21.76	9.53	0		
4	Ravichandran Ashwin	15	15	51.0	0	391	13	3/29	30.07	7.66	23.5	0	0
5	Axar Patel	15	15	51.0	0	327	9	2/18	36.33	6.41	34.0	0	0

- Kagiso Rabada was awarded the Purple Cap as the bowler who took most wickets during the tournament
- Source: ESPNcricinfo

== Awards and achievements ==
The following players were awarded the player of the match award during the tournament:

No.	Date	Player	Opponent	Result	Contribution	Ref.
1	20 September 2020	Marcus Stoinis	Kings XI Punjab	Won in Super Over	53 (21)	
2	25 September 2020	Prithvi Shaw	Chennai Super Kings	Won by 15 runs	64 (43)	
3	3 October 2020	Shreyas Iyer	Kolkata Knight Riders	won by 18 runs	88* (38)	
4	5 October 2020	Axar Patel	Royal Challengers Bangalore	won by 59 runs	2/18 (4 overs)	
5	9 October 2020	Ravichandran Ashwin	Rajasthan Royals	Won by 46 runs	2/ 22 (4 overs)	
6	14 October 2020	Anrich Nortje	Rajasthan Royals	Won by 13 runs	2/33 (4 overs)	
7	17 October 2020	Shikhar Dhawan	Chennai Super Kings	Won by 5 wickets	101* (58)	
8	20 October 2020	Shikhar Dhawan	Kings XI Punjab	Lost by 5 wickets	106* (61)	
9	2 November 2020	Anrich Nortje	Royal Challengers Bangalore	Won by 6 wickets	3/33 (4 overs)	
11	8 November 2020 – Qualifier 2	Marcus Stoinis	Sunrisers Hyderabad	Won by 17 runs and advanced to the final	38(27) and 3/26 (3 overs)	
