= 2020 Indian Premier League =

Cricket tournament

- Dates: 19 September 2020 – 10 November 2020
- Administrator: Board of Control for Cricket in India
- Cricket format: Twenty20
- Tournament format(s): Double Round-robin and playoffs
- Host: United Arab Emirates
- Champions: Mumbai Indians (5th title)
- Runners-up: Delhi Capitals
- Participants: 8
- Matches: 60
- Most valuable player: Jofra Archer (RR)
- Most runs: KL Rahul (KXIP) (670)
- Most wickets: Kagiso Rabada (DC) (30)
- Official website: www.iplt20.com

The 2020 Indian Premier League (also known as IPL 13 and branded as Dream11 Indian Premier League 2020) was the thirteenth season of the Indian Premier League, a professional Twenty20 cricket (T20) league established by the Board of Control for Cricket in India (BCCI) in 2008. The tournament was originally scheduled to commence on 29 March 2020, but was suspended until 15 April due to the COVID-19 pandemic. After Indian Prime Minister Narendra Modi announced on 14 April that the lockdown in India would last until at least 3 May 2020, the BCCI suspended the tournament indefinitely. On 2 August 2020, it was announced that the tournament would be played between 19 September and 10 November 2020 in the United Arab Emirates.

On 4 August 2020, Vivo pulled out as the title sponsor of the Indian Premier League (IPL) for the 2020 edition. On 18 August, fantasy cricket league platform Dream11 was named the title sponsor for the season with a bid of ₹222 crore (US$23 million).

Defending champions Mumbai Indians successfully retained their title for the first time with a five-wicket win over Delhi Capitals in the final on 10 November 2020.

== Background ==
The BCCI released the fixture details on 18 February 2020. The league stage was scheduled to start on 29 March 2020, with the opening match between Mumbai Indians and Chennai Super Kings, the finalists of the previous season, at Wankhede Stadium in Mumbai. However, due to the coronavirus pandemic, Maharashtra Chief Minister Uddhav Thackeray announced on 12 March that IPL matches can be held in the state only if they are played in empty stadiums. Deputy Chief Minister of Delhi Manish Sisodia declared that no IPL matches will be held in Delhi.

On 13 March, the BCCI suspended the tournament until 15 April, in view of the ongoing coronavirus pandemic. The decision regarding the postponement was reached by the Governing Council after a meeting with the owners of all eight franchise teams. On 9 April, with India under a nationwide lockdown, a BCCI official told CNBC TV18 that the Board was considering hosting the tournament in July or during the winter, possibly behind closed doors. On 14 April 2020, Indian Prime Minister Narendra Modi said that the lockdown in India would last until at least 3 May 2020, with the tournament postponed further. The following day, the BCCI suspended the tournament indefinitely due to the pandemic.

On 17 April 2020, Sri Lanka Cricket offered to host the tournament. On 17 May 2020, the Indian government relaxed nationwide restrictions on sports events, allowing events to take place behind closed doors. On 24 May, Indian sports minister Kiren Rijiju stated that the decision on whether or not to allow the tournament to be conducted in 2020 will be made by the Indian government based on "the situation of the pandemic". News reports on 17 July suggested that the BCCI was considering hosting the tournament in the United Arab Emirates between the tentative dates of 26 September and 7 November.

After the International Cricket Council (ICC) postponed the 2020 edition of the Men's T20 World Cup, the BCCI sought Government of India's permission to move the tournament to the UAE. On 24 July 2020, IPL Governing Council chairman Brijesh Patel said that the tournament would be played in the UAE between 19 September and 10 November, should it get the nod from Government of India. On 10 August 2020, the Government of India gave its permission for the tournament to take place in the UAE. The full fixtures for the tournament were confirmed on 6 September 2020.

== Rules and regulations ==
Some of the rules were changed for the 2020 edition of the IPL.

1. Players will not be allowed to use saliva to shine the ball.
2. All the matches will be played without an audience.
3. Captains will not shake hands after the toss.
4. Front foot no-balls will be adjudicated by the third umpire rather than the on-field umpire.
5. Teams will be allowed replacements if a player tests positive for COVID-19.
6. If a Super Over is a tie, subsequent Super Overs shall be played until there is a winner.

=== Change in broadcast timings ===
Until this season, all matches started at 8:00 PM IST, with some weekends hosting a 4:00 PM afternoon game. At the request of Star Sports, BCCI agreed to start every match half an hour earlier. This led to the matches starting at 7:30 PM on weekdays, and weekends having both a 7:30 PM and a 3:30 PM game. This was done in an attempt to increase viewership and monetization, by trying to align it with prime time.

=== Mid-season transfer ===
For the first time in IPL history, mid-season transfer was introduced. In mid-season transfer, teams can transfer players between teams like the European football leagues. For the mid-season transfer to begin, all teams must have played 7 matches. Then for a player to be transferred, the player should have played a maximum 2 matches. The player can be capped or uncapped and both Indian and International players can be transferred.

== Personnel changes ==
Kings XI Punjab's captain Ravichandran Ashwin was transferred to Delhi Capitals in November 2019. Ajinkya Rahane, Trent Boult and Mayank Markande got salary raises during pre-auction trades. The released players were announced on 15 November 2019. Robin Uthappa, Yuvraj Singh and Chris Lynn were the most prominent names among the released players. Jaydev Unadkat, the costliest Indian player in 2019 auction, was also released. There were 12 transfers between teams during the 2020 transfer window.

The players auction for the 2020 season was held on 19 December 2019 in Kolkata. Pat Cummins was the most expensive player, purchased by the Kolkata Knight Riders for ₹15.5 crore (US$1.6 million), in doing so Cummins became the most expensive overseas player in the history of the IPL auction at the time. The most expensive Indian player sold was Piyush Chawla for ₹6.75 crore (US$710,000) to Chennai Super Kings. On 18 August, Delhi Capitals signed Anrich Nortje to replace Chris Woakes. On 31 August, Royal Challengers Bangalore bought Adam Zampa as a replacement for Kane Richardson. On 2 September, Australian fast bowler James Pattinson was named as a replacement for Lasith Malinga. On 12 September, Ali Khan became the first American cricketer to join IPL after he was selected as the replacement for Harry Gurney in Kolkata Knight Riders. Mitchell Marsh injured himself during Sunrisers Hyderabad's first match and was hence ruled out of the tournament. Jason Holder was named as his replacement.

=== Key personnel ===
Team	Coach	Captain
Chennai Super Kings	Stephen Fleming	MS Dhoni
Delhi Capitals	Ricky Ponting	Shreyas Iyer
Kings XI Punjab	Anil Kumble	KL Rahul
Kolkata Knight Riders	Brendon McCullum	Dinesh Karthik; Eoin Morgan
Mumbai Indians	Mahela Jayawardene	Rohit Sharma
Rajasthan Royals	Andrew McDonald	Steve Smith
Royal Challengers Bangalore	Simon Katich	Virat Kohli
Sunrisers Hyderabad	Trevor Bayliss	David Warner

== Venues ==
United Arab Emirates
Dubai	Sharjah	Abu Dhabi
Dubai International Cricket Stadium	Sharjah Cricket Stadium	Sheikh Zayed Cricket Stadium
Capacity: 25,000	Capacity: 16,000	Capacity: 20,000
2020 Indian Premier League is located in United Arab Emirates

== Teams and standings ==
=== Points table ===
Pos	Team	Pld	W	L	NR	Pts	NRR	Qualification
1	Mumbai Indians (C)	14	9	5	0	18	1.107	Advance to Qualifier 1
2	Delhi Capitals (R)	14	8	6	0	16	−0.109	Advance to Qualifier 1
3	Sunrisers Hyderabad (3rd)	14	7	7	0	14	0.608	Advance to Eliminator
4	Royal Challengers Bangalore (4th)	14	7	7	0	14	−0.172	Advance to Eliminator
5	Kolkata Knight Riders	14	7	7	0	14	−0.214	
6	Kings XI Punjab	14	6	8	0	12	−0.162	
7	Chennai Super Kings	14	6	8	0	12	−0.455	
8	Rajasthan Royals	14	6	8	0	12	−0.569	

Source: IPLT20.com
The four top ranked teams qualify for the playoffs.

=== Match summary ===
Team	Group matches														Playoffs			
Team	1	2	3	4	5	6	7	8	9	10	11	12	13	14	Q1	E	Q2	F
Chennai Super Kings	2	2	2	2	4	4	4	6	6	6	6	8	10	12				
Delhi Capitals	2	4	4	6	8	10	10	12	14	14	14	14	14	16	L		W	L
Kings XI Punjab	0	2	2	2	2	2	2	4	6	8	10	12	12	12				
Kolkata Knight Riders	0	2	4	4	6	8	8	8	10	10	12	12	12	14				
Mumbai Indians	0	2	2	4	6	8	10	12	12	14	14	16	18	18	W			W
Rajasthan Royals	2	4	4	4	4	4	6	6	6	8	8	10	12	12				
Royal Challengers Bengaluru	2	2	4	6	6	8	10	10	12	14	14	14	14	14		L		
Sunrisers Hyderabad	0	0	2	4	4	6	6	6	6	8	8	10	12	14		W	L	

Win	Loss	No result

- Note: The total points at the end of each group match are listed.
- Note: Click on the points (group matches) or W/L (playoffs) to see the match summary.

Visitor team →	CSK	DC	KXIP	KKR	MI	RR	RCB	SRH
Home team ↓	CSK	DC	KXIP	KKR	MI	RR	RCB	SRH
Chennai Super Kings		Delhi; 44 runs	Chennai; 9 wickets	Chennai; 6 wickets	Mumbai; 10 wickets	Rajasthan; 7 wickets	Bengaluru; 37 runs	Hyderabad; 7 runs
Delhi Capitals	Delhi; 5 wickets		Delhi; Super Over	Delhi; 18 runs	Mumbai; 9 wickets	Delhi; 13 runs	Delhi; 6 wickets	Hyderabad; 15 runs
Kings XI Punjab	Chennai; 10 wickets	Punjab; 5 wickets		Kolkata; 2 runs	Mumbai; 48 runs	Rajasthan; 7 wickets	Punjab; 97 runs	Punjab; 12 runs
Kolkata Knight Riders	Kolkata; 10 runs	Kolkata; 59 runs	Punjab; 8 wickets		Mumbai; 49 runs	Kolkata; 60 runs	Bengaluru; 8 wickets	Kolkata; 7 wickets
Mumbai Indians	Chennai; 5 wickets	Mumbai; 5 wickets	Punjab; Super Over	Mumbai; 8 wickets		Mumbai; 57 runs	Mumbai; 5 wickets	Mumbai; 34 runs
Rajasthan Royals	Rajasthan; 16 runs	Delhi; 47 runs	Rajasthan; 4 wickets	Kolkata; 37 runs	Rajasthan; 8 wickets		Bengaluru; 7 wickets	Hyderabad; 8 wickets
Royal Challengers Bengaluru	Chennai; 8 wickets	Delhi; 59 runs	Punjab; 8 wickets	Bengaluru; 82 runs	Bengaluru; Super Over	Bengaluru; 8 wickets		Hyderabad; 5 wickets
Sunrisers Hyderabad	Chennai; 20 runs	Hyderabad; 88 runs	Hyderabad; 69 runs	Kolkata; Super Over	Hyderabad; 10 wickets	Rajasthan; 5 wickets	Bengaluru; 10 runs	

Home team won	Visitor team won

- Note: Results listed are according to the home (horizontal) and visitor (vertical) teams.
- Note: Click on a result to see a summary of the match.

== League stage ==
The schedule for the league stages of the 2020 season was published on the official IPL website on 6 September. The schedule for playoffs was announced later on 25 October 2020.

=== Matches ===
19 September 2020
19:30 (D/N)
Scorecard

Mumbai Indians; 162/9 (20 overs)	v	Chennai Super Kings; 166/5 (19.2 overs)
Saurabh Tiwary 42 (31); Lungi Ngidi 3/38 (4 overs)		Ambati Rayudu 71 (48); Trent Boult 1/23 (3.2 overs)

Chennai Super Kings won by 5 wickets
Sheikh Zayed Cricket Stadium, Abu Dhabi
Umpires: Chris Gaffaney (NZ) and Virender Sharma (Ind)
Player of the match: Ambati Rayudu (Chennai Super Kings)

- Chennai Super Kings won the toss and elected to field.

20 September 2020
19:30 (D/N)
Scorecard

Delhi Capitals; 157/8 (20 overs)	v	Kings XI Punjab; 157/8 (20 overs)
Marcus Stoinis 53 (21); Mohammed Shami 3/15 (4 overs)		Mayank Agarwal 89 (60); Ravichandran Ashwin 2/2 (1 over)

Match tied
(Delhi Capitals won the Super Over)
Dubai International Cricket Stadium, Dubai
Umpires: Anil Chaudhary (Ind) and Nitin Menon (Ind)
Player of the match: Marcus Stoinis (Delhi Capitals)

- Kings XI Punjab won the toss and elected to field.
- Super Over: Kings XI Punjab 2/2 (1 over), Delhi Capitals 3/0 (0.2 overs)

21 September 2020
19:30 (D/N)
Scorecard

Royal Challengers Bangalore; 163/5 (20 overs)	v	Sunrisers Hyderabad; 153 (19.4 overs)
Devdutt Padikkal 56 (42); Vijay Shankar 1/14 (1.2 overs)		Jonny Bairstow 61 (43); Yuzvendra Chahal 3/18 (4 overs)

Royal Challengers Bangalore won by 10 runs
Dubai International Cricket Stadium, Dubai
Umpires: Anil Dandekar (Ind) and Nitin Menon (Ind)
Player of the match: Yuzvendra Chahal (Royal Challengers Bangalore)

- Sunrisers Hyderabad won the toss and elected to field.

22 September 2020
19:30 (D/N)
Scorecard

Rajasthan Royals; 216/7 (20 overs)	v	Chennai Super Kings; 200/6 (20 overs)
Sanju Samson 74 (32); Sam Curran 3/33 (4 overs)		Faf du Plessis 72 (37); Rahul Tewatia 3/37 (4 overs)

Rajasthan Royals won by 16 runs
Sharjah Cricket Stadium, Sharjah
Umpires: Vineet Kulkarni (Ind) and Chettithody Shamshuddin (Ind)
Player of the match: Sanju Samson (Rajasthan Royals)

- Chennai Super Kings won the toss and elected to field.
- Yashasvi Jaiswal (Rajasthan Royals) made his T20 debut.

23 September 2020
19:30 (D/N)
Scorecard

Mumbai Indians; 195/5 (20 overs)	v	Kolkata Knight Riders; 146/9 (20 overs)
Rohit Sharma 80 (54); Shivam Mavi 2/32 (4 overs)		Pat Cummins 33 (12); James Pattinson 2/25 (4 overs)

Mumbai Indians won by 49 runs
Sheikh Zayed Cricket Stadium, Abu Dhabi
Umpires: Chris Gaffaney (NZ) and Sundaram Ravi (Ind)
Player of the match: Rohit Sharma (Mumbai Indians)

- Kolkata Knight Riders won the toss and elected to field.

24 September 2020
19:30 (D/N)
Scorecard

Kings XI Punjab; 206/3 (20 overs)	v	Royal Challengers Bangalore; 109 (17 overs)
K. L. Rahul 132* (69); Shivam Dube 2/33 (3 overs)		Washington Sundar 30 (27); Murugan Ashwin 3/21 (3 overs)

Kings XI Punjab won by 97 runs
Dubai International Cricket Stadium, Dubai
Umpires: Anil Chaudhary (Ind) and Paul Reiffel (Aus)
Player of the match: K. L. Rahul (Kings XI Punjab)

- Royal Challengers Bangalore won the toss and elected to field.
- K. L. Rahul (Kings XI Punjab) scored the highest total by an Indian batsman in the IPL, and the highest total by a team captain in the IPL.

25 September 2020
19:30 (D/N)
Scorecard

Delhi Capitals; 175/3 (20 overs)	v	Chennai Super Kings; 131/7 (20 overs)
Prithvi Shaw 64 (43); Piyush Chawla 2/33 (4 overs)		Faf du Plessis 43 (35); Kagiso Rabada 3/26 (4 overs)

Delhi Capitals won by 44 runs
Dubai International Cricket Stadium, Dubai
Umpires: K. N. Ananthapadmanabhan (Ind) and Richard Illingworth (Eng)
Player of the match: Prithvi Shaw (Delhi Capitals)

- Chennai Super Kings won the toss and elected to field.

26 September 2020
19:30 (D/N)
Scorecard

Sunrisers Hyderabad; 142/4 (20 overs)	v	Kolkata Knight Riders; 145/3 (18 overs)
Manish Pandey 51 (38); Andre Russell 1/16 (2 overs)		Shubman Gill 70* (62); Rashid Khan 1/25 (4 overs)

Kolkata Knight Riders won by 7 wickets
Sheikh Zayed Cricket Stadium, Abu Dhabi
Umpires: Chris Gaffaney (NZ) and Virender Sharma (Ind)
Player of the match: Shubman Gill (Kolkata Knight Riders)

- Sunrisers Hyderabad won the toss and elected to bat.
- Kamlesh Nagarkoti (Kolkata Knight Riders) made his T20 debut.

27 September 2020
19:30 (D/N)
Scorecard

Kings XI Punjab; 223/2 (20 overs)	v	Rajasthan Royals; 226/6 (19.3 overs)
Mayank Agarwal 106 (50); Ankit Rajpoot 1/39 (4 overs)		Sanju Samson 85 (42); Mohammed Shami 3/53 (4 overs)

Rajasthan Royals won by 4 wickets
Sharjah Cricket Stadium, Sharjah
Umpires: Richard Illingworth (Eng) and Krishnamachari Srinivasan (Ind)
Player of the match: Sanju Samson (Rajasthan Royals)

- Rajasthan Royals won the toss and elected to field.
- Rajasthan Royals made the highest successful run-chase in Indian Premier League history.

28 September 2020
19:30 (D/N)
Scorecard

Royal Challengers Bangalore; 201/3 (20 overs)	v	Mumbai Indians; 201/5 (20 overs)
AB de Villiers 55* (24); Trent Boult 2/34 (4 overs)		Ishan Kishan 99 (58); Isuru Udana 2/45 (4 overs)

Match tied
(Royal Challengers Bangalore won the Super Over)
Dubai International Cricket Stadium, Dubai
Umpires: Nitin Menon (Ind) and Paul Reiffel (Aus)
Player of the match: AB de Villiers (Royal Challengers Bangalore)

- Mumbai Indians won the toss and elected to field.
- Super Over: Mumbai Indians 7/1 (1 over), Royal Challengers Bangalore 11/0 (1 over)

29 September 2020
19:30 (D/N)
Scorecard

Sunrisers Hyderabad; 162/4 (20 overs)	v	Delhi Capitals; 147/7 (20 overs)
Jonny Bairstow 53 (48); Kagiso Rabada 2/21 (4 overs)		Shikhar Dhawan 34 (31); Rashid Khan 3/14 (4 overs)

Sunrisers Hyderabad won by 15 runs
Sheikh Zayed Cricket Stadium, Abu Dhabi
Umpires: Sundaram Ravi (Ind) and Virender Sharma (Ind)
Player of the match: Rashid Khan (Sunrisers Hyderabad)

- Delhi Capitals won the toss and elected to field.

30 September 2020
19:30 (D/N)
Scorecard

Kolkata Knight Riders; 174/6 (20 overs)	v	Rajasthan Royals; 137/9 (20 overs)
Shubman Gill 47 (34); Jofra Archer 2/18 (4 overs)		Tom Curran 54* (36); Kamlesh Nagarkoti 2/13 (2 overs)

Kolkata Knight Riders won by 37 runs
Dubai International Cricket Stadium, Dubai
Umpires: K. N. Ananthapadmanabhan (Ind) and Chettithody Shamshuddin (Ind)
Player of the match: Shivam Mavi (Kolkata Knight Riders)

- Rajasthan Royals won the toss and elected to field.

1 October 2020
19:30 (D/N)
Scorecard

Mumbai Indians; 191/4 (20 overs)	v	Kings XI Punjab; 143/8 (20 overs)
Rohit Sharma 70 (45); Sheldon Cottrell 1/20 (4 overs)		Nicholas Pooran 44 (27); Jasprit Bumrah 2/18 (4 overs)

Mumbai Indians won by 48 runs
Sheikh Zayed Cricket Stadium, Abu Dhabi
Umpires: Sundaram Ravi (Ind) and Virender Sharma (Ind)
Player of the match: Kieron Pollard (Mumbai Indians)

- Kings XI Punjab won the toss and elected to field.
- Rohit Sharma (Mumbai Indians) became the third player to reach 5,000 IPL runs.

2 October 2020
19:30 (D/N)
Scorecard

Sunrisers Hyderabad; 164/5 (20 overs)	v	Chennai Super Kings; 157/5 (20 overs)
Priyam Garg 51* (26); Deepak Chahar 2/31 (4 overs)		Ravindra Jadeja 50 (35); T. Natarajan 2/43 (4 overs)

Sunrisers Hyderabad won by 7 runs
Dubai International Cricket Stadium, Dubai
Umpires: Anil Chaudhary (Ind) and Paul Reiffel (Aus)
Player of the match: Priyam Garg (Sunrisers Hyderabad)

- Sunrisers Hyderabad won the toss and elected to bat.

3 October 2020
15:30
Scorecard

Rajasthan Royals; 154/6 (20 overs)	v	Royal Challengers Bangalore; 158/2 (19.1 overs)
Mahipal Lomror 47 (39); Yuzvendra Chahal 3/24 (4 overs)		Virat Kohli 72* (53); Jofra Archer 1/18 (4 overs)

Royal Challengers Bangalore won by 8 wickets
Sheikh Zayed Cricket Stadium, Abu Dhabi
Umpires: Chris Gaffaney (NZ) and Sundaram Ravi (Ind)
Player of the match: Yuzvendra Chahal (Royal Challengers Bangalore)

- Rajasthan Royals won the toss and elected to bat.

3 October 2020
19:30 (D/N)
Scorecard

Delhi Capitals; 228/4 (20 overs)	v	Kolkata Knight Riders; 210/8 (20 overs)
Shreyas Iyer 88* (38); Andre Russell 2/29 (4 overs)		Nitish Rana 58 (35); Anrich Nortje 3/33 (4 overs)

Delhi Capitals won by 18 runs
Sharjah Cricket Stadium, Sharjah
Umpires: Richard Illingworth (Eng) and Vineet Kulkarni (Ind)
Player of the match: Shreyas Iyer (Delhi Capitals)

- Kolkata Knight Riders won the toss and elected to field.

4 October 2020
15:30
Scorecard

Mumbai Indians; 208/5 (20 overs)	v	Sunrisers Hyderabad; 174/7 (20 overs)
Quinton de Kock 67 (39); Sandeep Sharma 2/41 (4 overs)		David Warner 60 (44); Trent Boult 2/28 (4 overs)

Mumbai Indians won by 34 runs
Sharjah Cricket Stadium, Sharjah
Umpires: K. N. Ananthapadmanabhan (Ind) and Richard Illingworth (Eng)
Player of the match: Trent Boult (Mumbai Indians)

- Mumbai Indians won the toss and elected to bat.

4 October 2020
19:30 (D/N)
Scorecard

Kings XI Punjab; 178/4 (20 overs)	v	Chennai Super Kings; 181/0 (17.4 overs)
K. L. Rahul 63 (52); Shardul Thakur 2/39 (4 overs)		Faf du Plessis 87* (53)

Chennai Super Kings won by 10 wickets
Dubai International Cricket Stadium, Dubai
Umpires: Anil Dandekar (Ind) and Nitin Menon (Ind)
Player of the match: Shane Watson (Chennai Super Kings)

- Kings XI Punjab won the toss and elected to bat.

5 October 2020
19:30 (D/N)
Scorecard

Delhi Capitals; 196/4 (20 overs)	v	Royal Challengers Bangalore; 137/9 (20 overs)
Marcus Stoinis 53* (26); Mohammed Siraj 2/34 (4 overs)		Virat Kohli 43 (39); Kagiso Rabada 4/24 (4 overs)

Delhi Capitals won by 59 runs
Dubai International Cricket Stadium, Dubai
Umpires: Yeshwant Barde (Ind) and Nitin Menon (Ind)
Player of the match: Axar Patel (Delhi Capitals)

- Royal Challengers Bangalore won the toss and elected to field.
- Virat Kohli (Royal Challengers Bangalore) became the first Indian player to reach 9,000 T20 runs.

6 October 2020
19:30 (D/N)
Scorecard

Mumbai Indians; 193/4 (20 overs)	v	Rajasthan Royals; 136 (18.1 overs)
Suryakumar Yadav 79* (47); Shreyas Gopal 2/28 (4 overs)		Jos Buttler 70 (44); Jasprit Bumrah 4/20 (4 overs)

Mumbai Indians won by 57 runs
Sheikh Zayed Cricket Stadium, Abu Dhabi
Umpires: Sundaram Ravi (Ind) and Virender Sharma (Ind)
Player of the match: Suryakumar Yadav (Mumbai Indians)

- Mumbai Indians won the toss and elected to bat.
- Kartik Tyagi (Rajasthan Royals) made his T20 debut.

7 October 2020
19:30 (D/N)
Scorecard

Kolkata Knight Riders; 167 (20 overs)	v	Chennai Super Kings; 157/5 (20 overs)
Rahul Tripathi 81 (51); Dwayne Bravo 3/37 (4 overs)		Shane Watson 50 (40); Andre Russell 1/18 (2 overs)

Kolkata Knight Riders won by 10 runs
Sheikh Zayed Cricket Stadium, Abu Dhabi
Umpires: K. N. Ananthapadmanabhan (Ind) and Richard Illingworth (Eng)
Player of the match: Rahul Tripathi (Kolkata Knight Riders)

- Kolkata Knight Riders won the toss and elected to bat.

8 October 2020
19:30 (D/N)
Scorecard

Sunrisers Hyderabad; 201/6 (20 overs)	v	Kings XI Punjab; 132 (16.5 overs)
Jonny Bairstow 97 (55); Ravi Bishnoi 3/29 (3 overs)		Nicholas Pooran 77 (37); Rashid Khan 3/12 (4 overs)

Sunrisers Hyderabad won by 69 runs
Dubai International Cricket Stadium, Dubai
Umpires: Anil Chaudhary (Ind) and Nitin Menon (Ind)
Player of the match: Jonny Bairstow (Sunrisers Hyderabad)

- Sunrisers Hyderabad won the toss and elected to bat.

9 October 2020
19:30 (D/N)
Scorecard

Delhi Capitals; 184/8 (20 overs)	v	Rajasthan Royals; 138 (19.4 overs)
Shimron Hetmyer 45 (24); Jofra Archer 3/24 (4 overs)		Rahul Tewatia 38 (29); Kagiso Rabada 3/35 (3.4 overs)

Delhi Capitals won by 46 runs
Sharjah Cricket Stadium, Sharjah
Umpires: K. N. Ananthapadmanabhan (Ind) and Chettithody Shamshuddin (Ind)
Player of the match: Ravichandran Ashwin (Delhi Capitals)

- Rajasthan Royals won the toss and elected to field.

10 October 2020
15:30
Scorecard

Kolkata Knight Riders; 164/6 (20 overs)	v	Kings XI Punjab; 162/5 (20 overs)
Dinesh Karthik 58 (29); Ravi Bishnoi 1/25 (4 overs); Arshdeep Singh 1/25 (4 overs)		K. L. Rahul 74 (58); Prasidh Krishna 3/29 (4 overs)

Kolkata Knight Riders won by 2 runs
Sheikh Zayed Cricket Stadium, Abu Dhabi
Umpires: Chris Gaffaney (NZ) and Ulhas Gandhe (Ind)
Player of the match: Dinesh Karthik (Kolkata Knight Riders)

- Kolkata Knight Riders won the toss and elected to bat.

10 October 2020
19:30 (D/N)
Scorecard

Royal Challengers Bangalore; 169/4 (20 overs)	v	Chennai Super Kings; 132/8 (20 overs)
Virat Kohli 90* (52); Shardul Thakur 2/40 (4 overs)		Ambati Rayudu 42 (40); Chris Morris 3/19 (4 overs)

Royal Challengers Bangalore won by 37 runs
Dubai International Cricket Stadium, Dubai
Umpires: Anil Chaudhary (Ind) and Paul Reiffel (Aus)
Player of the match: Virat Kohli (Royal Challengers Bangalore)

- Royal Challengers Bangalore won the toss and elected to bat.

11 October 2020
15:30
Scorecard

Sunrisers Hyderabad; 158/4 (20 overs)	v	Rajasthan Royals; 163/5 (19.5 overs)
Manish Pandey 54 (44); Jofra Archer 1/25 (4 overs)		Rahul Tewatia 45* (28); Rashid Khan 2/25 (4 overs)

Rajasthan Royals won by 5 wickets
Dubai International Cricket Stadium, Dubai
Umpires: Yeshwant Barde (Ind) and Paul Reiffel (Aus)
Player of the match: Rahul Tewatia (Rajasthan Royals)

- Sunrisers Hyderabad won the toss and elected to bat.

11 October 2020
19:30 (D/N)
Scorecard

Delhi Capitals; 162/4 (20 overs)	v	Mumbai Indians; 166/5 (19.4 overs)
Shikhar Dhawan 69* (52); Krunal Pandya 2/26 (4 overs)		Suryakumar Yadav 53 (32); Kagiso Rabada 2/28 (4 overs)

Mumbai Indians won by 5 wickets
Sheikh Zayed Cricket Stadium, Abu Dhabi
Umpires: Chris Gaffaney (NZ) and Sundaram Ravi (Ind)
Player of the match: Quinton de Kock (Mumbai Indians)

- Delhi Capitals won the toss and elected to bat.

12 October 2020
19:30 (D/N)
Scorecard

Royal Challengers Bangalore; 194/2 (20 overs)	v	Kolkata Knight Riders; 112/9 (20 overs)
AB de Villiers 73* (33); Prasidh Krishna 1/42 (4 overs)		Shubman Gill 34 (25); Chris Morris 2/17 (4 overs)

Royal Challengers Bangalore won by 82 runs
Sharjah Cricket Stadium, Sharjah
Umpires: Richard Illingworth (Eng) and Krishnamachari Srinivasan (Ind)
Player of the match: AB de Villiers (Royal Challengers Bangalore)

- Royal Challengers Bangalore won the toss and elected to bat.

13 October 2020
19:30 (D/N)
Scorecard

Chennai Super Kings; 167/6 (20 overs)	v	Sunrisers Hyderabad; 147/8 (20 overs)
Shane Watson 42 (38); Sandeep Sharma 2/19 (4 overs)		Kane Williamson 57 (39); Dwayne Bravo 2/25 (3 overs)

Chennai Super Kings won by 20 runs
Dubai International Cricket Stadium, Dubai
Umpires: Anil Chaudhary (Ind) and Paul Reiffel (Aus)
Player of the match: Ravindra Jadeja (Chennai Super Kings)

- Chennai Super Kings won the toss and elected to bat.

14 October 2020
19:30 (D/N)
Scorecard

Delhi Capitals; 161/7 (20 overs)	v	Rajasthan Royals; 148/8 (20 overs)
Shikhar Dhawan 57 (33); Jofra Archer 3/19 (4 overs)		Ben Stokes 41 (35); Anrich Nortje 2/33 (4 overs)

Delhi Capitals won by 13 runs
Dubai International Cricket Stadium, Dubai
Umpires: Anil Chaudhary (Ind) and Nitin Menon (Ind)
Player of the match: Anrich Nortje (Delhi Capitals)

- Delhi Capitals won the toss and elected to bat.

15 October 2020
19:30 (D/N)
Scorecard

Royal Challengers Bangalore; 171/6 (20 overs)	v	Kings XI Punjab; 177/2 (20 overs)
Virat Kohli 48 (39); Murugan Ashwin 2/23 (4 overs)		K. L. Rahul 61* (49); Yuzvendra Chahal 1/35 (3 overs)

Kings XI Punjab won by 8 wickets
Sharjah Cricket Stadium, Sharjah
Umpires: K. N. Ananthapadmanabhan (Ind) and Chettithody Shamshuddin (Ind)
Player of the match: K. L. Rahul (Kings XI Punjab)

- Royal Challengers Bangalore won the toss and elected to bat.

16 October 2020
19:30 (D/N)
Scorecard

Kolkata Knight Riders; 148/5 (20 overs)	v	Mumbai Indians; 149/2 (16.5 overs)
Pat Cummins 53* (36); Rahul Chahar 2/18 (4 overs)		Quinton de Kock 78* (44); Varun Chakravarthy 1/23 (4 overs)

Mumbai Indians won by 8 wickets
Sheikh Zayed Cricket Stadium, Abu Dhabi
Umpires: Chris Gaffaney (NZ) and Virender Sharma (Ind)
Player of the match: Quinton de Kock (Mumbai Indians)

- Kolkata Knight Riders won the toss and elected to bat.

17 October 2020
15:30 (D/N)
Scorecard

Rajasthan Royals; 177/6 (20 overs)	v	Royal Challengers Bangalore; 179/3 (19.4 overs)
Steve Smith 57 (36); Chris Morris 4/26 (4 overs)		AB de Villiers 55* (22); Rahul Tewatia 1/30 (4 overs)

Royal Challengers Bangalore won by 7 wickets
Dubai International Cricket Stadium, Dubai
Umpires: Anil Chaudhary (Ind) and Nitin Menon (Ind)
Player of the match: AB de Villiers (Royal Challengers Bangalore)

- Rajasthan Royals won the toss and elected to bat.

17 October 2020
19:30 (D/N)
Scorecard

Chennai Super Kings; 179/4 (20 overs)	v	Delhi Capitals; 185/5 (19.5 overs)
Faf du Plessis 58 (47); Anrich Nortje 2/44 (4 overs)		Shikhar Dhawan 101* (58); Deepak Chahar 2/18 (4 overs)

Delhi Capitals won by 5 wickets
Sharjah Cricket Stadium, Sharjah
Umpires: K. N. Ananthapadmanabhan (Ind) and Richard Illingworth (Eng)
Player of the match: Shikhar Dhawan (Delhi Capitals)

- Chennai Super Kings won the toss and elected to bat.
- Shikhar Dhawan (Delhi Capitals) scored his first century in T20s.

18 October 2020
15:30 (D/N)
Scorecard

Kolkata Knight Riders; 163/5 (20 overs)	v	Sunrisers Hyderabad; 163/6 (20 overs)
Shubman Gill 36 (37); T. Natarajan 2/40 (4 overs)		David Warner 47* (33); Lockie Ferguson 3/15 (4 overs)

Match tied
(Kolkata Knight Riders won the Super Over)
Sheikh Zayed Cricket Stadium, Abu Dhabi
Umpires: Pashchim Pathak (Ind) and Sundaram Ravi (Ind)
Player of the match: Lockie Ferguson (Kolkata Knight Riders)

- Sunrisers Hyderabad won the toss and elected to field.
- Super Over: Sunrisers Hyderabad 2/2 (0.3 overs), Kolkata Knight Riders 3/0 (0.3 overs)
- David Warner (Sunrisers Hyderabad) became the fastest player to reach 5,000 IPL runs (in his 135th innings), as well as the first overseas player, and the fourth overall to reach this landmark.

18 October 2020
19:30 (D/N)
Scorecard

Mumbai Indians; 176/6 (20 overs)	v	Kings XI Punjab; 176/6 (20 overs)
Quinton de Kock 53 (43); Mohammed Shami 2/30 (4 overs)		K. L. Rahul 77 (51); Jasprit Bumrah 3/24 (4 overs)

Match tied and Super Over tied
(Kings XI Punjab won the second Super Over)
Dubai International Cricket Stadium, Dubai
Umpires: Nitin Menon (Ind) and Paul Reiffel (Aus)
Player of the match: K. L. Rahul (Kings XI Punjab)

- Mumbai Indians won the toss and elected to bat.
- Super Over 1: Kings XI Punjab 5/2 (1 over), Mumbai Indians 5/1 (1 over) - Tied.
- Super Over 2: Mumbai Indians 11/1 (1 over), Kings XI Punjab 15/0 (0.4 overs)

19 October 2020
19:30 (D/N)
Scorecard

Chennai Super Kings; 125/5 (20 overs)	v	Rajasthan Royals; 126/3 (17.3 overs)
Ravindra Jadeja 35* (30); Shreyas Gopal 1/14 (4 overs)		Jos Buttler 70* (48); Deepak Chahar 2/18 (4 overs)

Rajasthan Royals won by 7 wickets
Sheikh Zayed Cricket Stadium, Abu Dhabi
Umpires: Chris Gaffaney (NZ) and Virender Sharma (Ind)
Player of the match: Jos Buttler (Rajasthan Royals)

- Chennai Super Kings won the toss and elected to bat.
- MS Dhoni (Chennai Super Kings) became the first player to appear in 200 IPL matches.

20 October 2020
19:30 (D/N)
Scorecard

Delhi Capitals; 164/5 (20 overs)	v	Kings XI Punjab; 167/5 (19 overs)
Shikhar Dhawan 106* (61); Mohammed Shami 2/28 (4 overs)		Nicholas Pooran 53 (28); Kagiso Rabada 2/27 (4 overs)

Kings XI Punjab won by 5 wickets
Dubai International Cricket Stadium, Dubai
Umpires: Richard Illingworth (Eng) and Chettithody Shamshuddin (Ind)
Player of the match: Shikhar Dhawan (Delhi Capitals)

- Delhi Capitals won the toss and elected to bat.
- Shikhar Dhawan (Delhi Capitals) became the fifth player overall and the fourth Indian to reach 5,000 IPL runs. He also became the first player to score two consecutive 100s in the IPL and became the fifth player to score multiple hundreds in a single season.

21 October 2020
19:30 (D/N)
Scorecard

Kolkata Knight Riders; 84/8 (20 overs)	v	Royal Challengers Bangalore; 85/2 (13.3 overs)
Eoin Morgan 30 (34); Mohammed Siraj 3/8 (4 overs)		Devdutt Padikkal 25 (17); Lockie Ferguson 1/17 (4 overs)

Royal Challengers Bangalore won by 8 wickets
Sheikh Zayed Cricket Stadium, Abu Dhabi
Umpires: Sundaram Ravi (Ind) and Virender Sharma (Ind)
Player of the match: Mohammed Siraj (Royal Challengers Bangalore)

- Kolkata Knight Riders won the toss and elected to bat.
- Mohammed Siraj (Royal Challengers Bangalore) became the first bowler to bowl two maiden overs in an IPL match.

22 October 2020
19:30 (D/N)
Scorecard

Rajasthan Royals; 154/6 (20 overs)	v	Sunrisers Hyderabad; 156/2 (18.1 overs)
Sanju Samson 36 (26); Jason Holder 3/33 (4 overs)		Manish Pandey 83* (47); Jofra Archer 2/21 (4 overs)

Sunrisers Hyderabad won by 8 wickets
Dubai International Cricket Stadium, Dubai
Umpires: Nitin Menon (Ind) and Paul Reiffel (Aus)
Player of the match: Manish Pandey (Sunrisers Hyderabad)

- Sunrisers Hyderabad won the toss and elected to field.

23 October 2020
19:30 (D/N)
Scorecard

Chennai Super Kings; 114/9 (20 overs)	v	Mumbai Indians; 116/0 (12.2 overs)
Sam Curran 52 (47); Trent Boult 4/18 (4 overs)		Ishan Kishan 68* (37)

Mumbai Indians won by 10 wickets
Sharjah Cricket Stadium, Sharjah
Umpires: Vineet Kulkarni (Ind) and Chettithody Shamshuddin (Ind)
Player of the match: Trent Boult (Mumbai Indians)

- Mumbai Indians won the toss and elected to field.

24 October 2020
15:30
Scorecard

Kolkata Knight Riders; 194/6 (20 overs)	v	Delhi Capitals; 135/9 (20 overs)
Nitish Rana 81 (53); Anrich Nortje 2/27 (4 overs)		Shreyas Iyer 47 (38); Varun Chakravarthy 5/20 (4 overs)

Kolkata Knight Riders won by 59 runs
Sheikh Zayed Cricket Stadium, Abu Dhabi
Umpires: Chris Gaffaney (NZ) and Pashchim Pathak (Ind)
Player of the match: Varun Chakravarthy (Kolkata Knight Riders)

- Delhi Capitals won the toss and elected to field.

24 October 2020
19:30 (D/N)
Scorecard

Kings XI Punjab; 126/7 (20 overs)	v	Sunrisers Hyderabad; 114 (19.5 overs)
Nicholas Pooran 32* (28); Rashid Khan 2/14 (4 overs)		David Warner 35 (20); Chris Jordan 3/17 (4 overs)

Kings XI Punjab won by 12 runs
Dubai International Cricket Stadium, Dubai
Umpires: Anil Dandekar (Ind) and Paul Reiffel (Aus)
Player of the match: Chris Jordan (Kings XI Punjab)

- Sunrisers Hyderabad won the toss and elected to field.

25 October 2020
15:30
Scorecard

Royal Challengers Bangalore; 145/6 (20 overs)	v	Chennai Super Kings; 150/2 (18.4 overs)
Virat Kohli 50 (43); Sam Curran 3/19 (3 overs)		Ruturaj Gaikwad 65* (51); Yuzvendra Chahal 1/21 (4 overs)

Chennai Super Kings won by 8 wickets
Dubai International Cricket Stadium, Dubai
Umpires: Richard Illingworth (Eng) and Chettithody Shamshuddin (Ind)
Player of the match: Ruturaj Gaikwad (Chennai Super Kings)

- Royal Challengers Bangalore won the toss and elected to bat.

25 October 2020
19:30 (D/N)
Scorecard

Mumbai Indians; 195/5 (20 overs)	v	Rajasthan Royals; 196/2 (18.2 overs)
Hardik Pandya 60* (21); Shreyas Gopal 2/30 (4 overs)		Ben Stokes 107* (60); James Pattinson 2/40 (3.2 overs)

Rajasthan Royals won by 8 wickets
Sheikh Zayed Cricket Stadium, Abu Dhabi
Umpires: Ulhas Gandhe (Ind) and Virender Sharma (Ind)
Player of the match: Ben Stokes (Rajasthan Royals)

- Mumbai Indians won the toss and elected to bat.
- Chennai Super Kings were eliminated as a result of this match.

26 October 2020
19:30 (D/N)
Scorecard

Kolkata Knight Riders; 149/9 (20 overs)	v	Kings XI Punjab; 150/2 (18.5 overs)
Shubman Gill 57 (45); Mohammed Shami 3/35 (4 overs)		Mandeep Singh 66* (56); Lockie Ferguson 1/32 (3.5 overs)

Kings XI Punjab won by 8 wickets
Sharjah Cricket Stadium, Sharjah
Umpires: K. N. Ananthapadmanabhan (Ind) and Richard Illingworth (Eng)
Player of the match: Chris Gayle (Kings XI Punjab)

- Kings XI Punjab won the toss and elected to field.

27 October 2020
19:30 (D/N)
Scorecard

Sunrisers Hyderabad; 219/2 (20 overs)	v	Delhi Capitals; 131 (19 overs)
Wriddhiman Saha 87 (45); Ravichandran Ashwin 1/35 (3 overs)		Rishabh Pant 36 (35); Rashid Khan 3/7 (4 overs)

Sunrisers Hyderabad won by 88 runs
Dubai International Cricket Stadium, Dubai
Umpires: Anil Chaudhary (Ind) and Nitin Menon (Ind)
Player of the match: Wriddhiman Saha (Sunrisers Hyderabad)

- Delhi Capitals won the toss and elected to field.

28 October 2020
19:30 (D/N)
Scorecard

Royal Challengers Bangalore; 164/6 (20 overs)	v	Mumbai Indians; 166/5 (19.1 overs)
Devdutt Padikkal 74 (45); Jasprit Bumrah 3/14 (4 overs)		Suryakumar Yadav 79* (43); Mohammed Siraj 2/28 (3.1 overs)

Mumbai Indians won by 5 wickets
Sheikh Zayed Cricket Stadium, Abu Dhabi
Umpires: Chris Gaffaney (NZ) and Ulhas Gandhe (Ind)
Player of the match: Suryakumar Yadav (Mumbai Indians)

- Mumbai Indians won the toss and elected to field.

29 October 2020
19:30 (D/N)
Scorecard

Kolkata Knight Riders; 172/5 (20 overs)	v	Chennai Super Kings; 178/4 (20 overs)
Nitish Rana 87 (61); Lungi Ngidi 2/34 (4 overs)		Ruturaj Gaikwad 72 (53); Varun Chakravarthy 2/20 (4 overs)

Chennai Super Kings won by 6 wickets
Dubai International Cricket Stadium, Dubai
Umpires: Richard Illingworth (Eng) and Chettithody Shamshuddin (Ind)
Player of the match: Ruturaj Gaikwad (Chennai Super Kings)

- Chennai Super Kings won the toss and elected to field.
- Mumbai Indians qualified for the playoffs as a result of this match.

30 October 2020
19:30 (D/N)
Scorecard

Kings XI Punjab; 185/4 (20 overs)	v	Rajasthan Royals; 186/3 (17.3 overs)
Chris Gayle 99 (63); Jofra Archer 2/26 (4 overs)		Ben Stokes 50 (26); Murugan Ashwin 1/43 (4 overs)

Rajasthan Royals won by 7 wickets
Sheikh Zayed Cricket Stadium, Abu Dhabi
Umpires: Chris Gaffaney (NZ) and Sundaram Ravi (Ind)
Player of the match: Ben Stokes (Rajasthan Royals)

- Rajasthan Royals won the toss and elected to field.
- Chris Gayle (Kings XI Punjab) became the first player to hit 1,000 sixes in T20 cricket.

31 October 2020
15:30
Scorecard

Delhi Capitals; 110/9 (20 overs)	v	Mumbai Indians; 111/1 (14.2 overs)
Shreyas Iyer 25 (29); Jasprit Bumrah 3/17 (4 overs)		Ishan Kishan 72* (47); Anrich Nortje 1/25 (2.2 overs)

Mumbai Indians won by 9 wickets
Dubai International Cricket Stadium, Dubai
Umpires: Yeshwant Barde (Ind) and Paul Reiffel (Aus)
Player of the match: Ishan Kishan (Mumbai Indians)

- Mumbai Indians won the toss and elected to field.
- Mumbai Indians advanced to Qualifier 1 as a result of this match.

31 October 2020
19:30 (D/N)
Scorecard

Royal Challengers Bangalore; 120/7 (20 overs)	v	Sunrisers Hyderabad; 121/5 (14.1 overs)
Josh Philippe 32 (31); Sandeep Sharma 2/20 (4 overs)		Wriddhiman Saha 39 (32); Yuzvendra Chahal 2/19 (3.1 overs)

Sunrisers Hyderabad won by 5 wickets
Sharjah Cricket Stadium, Sharjah
Umpires: K. N. Ananthapadmanabhan (Ind) and Krishnamachari Srinivasan (Ind)
Player of the match: Sandeep Sharma (Sunrisers Hyderabad)

- Sunrisers Hyderabad won the toss and elected to field.

1 November 2020
15:30
Scorecard

Kings XI Punjab; 153/6 (20 overs)	v	Chennai Super Kings; 154/1 (18.5 overs)
Deepak Hooda 62* (30); Lungi Ngidi 3/39 (4 overs)		Ruturaj Gaikwad 62* (49); Chris Jordan 1/31 (3 overs)

Chennai Super Kings won by 9 wickets
Sheikh Zayed Cricket Stadium, Abu Dhabi
Umpires: Pashchim Pathak (Ind) and Virender Sharma (Ind)
Player of the match: Ruturaj Gaikwad (Chennai Super Kings)

- Chennai Super Kings won the toss and elected to field.
- Kings XI Punjab were eliminated as a result of this match.

1 November 2020
19:30 (D/N)
Scorecard

Kolkata Knight Riders; 191/7 (20 overs)	v	Rajasthan Royals; 131/9 (20 overs)
Eoin Morgan 68* (35); Rahul Tewatia 3/25 (4 overs)		Jos Buttler 35 (22); Pat Cummins 4/34 (4 overs)

Kolkata Knight Riders won by 60 runs
Dubai International Cricket Stadium, Dubai
Umpires: Nitin Menon (Ind) and Paul Reiffel (Aus)
Player of the match: Pat Cummins (Kolkata Knight Riders)

- Rajasthan Royals won the toss and elected to field.
- Rajasthan Royals were eliminated as a result of this match.

2 November 2020
19:30 (D/N)
Scorecard

Royal Challengers Bangalore; 152/7 (20 overs)	v	Delhi Capitals; 154/4 (19 overs)
Devdutt Padikkal 50 (41); Anrich Nortje 3/33 (4 overs)		Ajinkya Rahane 60 (46); Shahbaz Ahmed 2/26 (4 overs)

Delhi Capitals won by 6 wickets
Sheikh Zayed Cricket Stadium, Abu Dhabi
Umpires: Chris Gaffaney (NZ) and Sundaram Ravi (Ind)
Player of the match: Anrich Nortje (Delhi Capitals)

- Delhi Capitals won the toss and elected to field.
- Royal Challengers Bangalore qualified for the playoffs and Delhi Capitals advanced to Qualifier 1 as a result of this match.

3 November 2020
19:30 (D/N)
Scorecard

Mumbai Indians; 149/8 (20 overs)	v	Sunrisers Hyderabad; 151/0 (17.1 overs)
Kieron Pollard 41 (25); Sandeep Sharma 3/34 (4 overs)		David Warner 85* (58)

Sunrisers Hyderabad won by 10 wickets
Sharjah Cricket Stadium, Sharjah
Umpires: Richard Illingworth (Eng) and Chettithody Shamshuddin (Ind)
Player of the match: Shahbaz Nadeem (Sunrisers Hyderabad)

- Sunrisers Hyderabad won the toss and elected to field.
- Sunrisers Hyderabad qualified for the playoffs for the fifth consecutive time and Kolkata Knight Riders were eliminated as a result of this match.

== Playoffs ==
Qualifier 1 / Eliminator
5 November 2020 — Dubai
1	Mumbai Indians	200/5 (20 overs)
2	Delhi Capitals	143/8 (20 overs)
6 November 2020 — Abu Dhabi
4	Royal Challengers Bangalore	131/7 (20 overs)
3	Sunrisers Hyderabad	132/4 (19.4 overs)

Qualifier 2
8 November 2020 — Abu Dhabi
Q1L	Delhi Capitals	189/3 (20 overs)
EW	Sunrisers Hyderabad	172/8 (20 overs)

Final
10 November 2020 — Dubai
Q1W	Mumbai Indians	157/5 (18.4 overs)
Q2W	Delhi Capitals	156/7 (20 overs)

=== Qualifier 1 ===
5 November 2020
19:30 (D/N)
Scorecard

Mumbai Indians; 200/5 (20 overs)	v	Delhi Capitals; 143/8 (20 overs)
Ishan Kishan 55* (30); Ravichandran Ashwin 3/29 (4 overs)		Marcus Stoinis 65 (46); Jasprit Bumrah 4/14 (4 overs)

Mumbai Indians won by 57 runs
Dubai International Cricket Stadium, Dubai
Umpires: Chris Gaffaney (NZ) and Nitin Menon (Ind)
Player of the match: Jasprit Bumrah (Mumbai Indians)

- Delhi Capitals won the toss and elected to field.

=== Eliminator ===
6 November 2020
19:30 (D/N)
Scorecard

Royal Challengers Bangalore; 131/7 (20 overs)	v	Sunrisers Hyderabad; 132/4 (19.4 overs)
AB de Villiers 56 (43); Jason Holder 3/25 (4 overs)		Kane Williamson 50* (44); Mohammed Siraj 2/28 (4 overs)

Sunrisers Hyderabad won by 6 wickets
Sheikh Zayed Cricket Stadium, Abu Dhabi
Umpires: Sundaram Ravi (Ind) and Paul Reiffel (Aus)
Player of the match: Kane Williamson (Sunrisers Hyderabad)

- Sunrisers Hyderabad won the toss and elected to field.

=== Qualifier 2 ===
8 November 2020
19:30 (D/N)
Scorecard

Delhi Capitals; 189/3 (20 overs)	v	Sunrisers Hyderabad; 172/8 (20 overs)
Shikhar Dhawan 78 (50); Rashid Khan 1/26 (4 overs)		Kane Williamson 67 (45); Kagiso Rabada 4/29 (4 overs)

Delhi Capitals won by 17 runs
Sheikh Zayed Cricket Stadium, Abu Dhabi
Umpires: Sundaram Ravi (Ind) and Paul Reiffel (Aus)
Player of the match: Marcus Stoinis (Delhi Capitals)

- Delhi Capitals won the toss and elected to bat.

=== Final ===
10 November 2020
19:30 (D/N)
Scorecard

Delhi Capitals; 156/7 (20 overs)	v	Mumbai Indians; 157/5 (18.4 overs)
Shreyas Iyer 65* (50); Trent Boult 3/30 (4 overs)		Rohit Sharma 68 (51); Anrich Nortje 2/25 (2.4 overs)

Mumbai Indians won by 5 wickets
Dubai International Cricket Stadium, Dubai
Umpires: Chris Gaffaney (NZ) and Nitin Menon (Ind)
Player of the match: Trent Boult (Mumbai Indians)

- Delhi Capitals won the toss and elected to bat.
- This was the fifth IPL title for the Mumbai Indians and they became the second team to win consecutive IPL trophies after Chennai Super Kings in 2010 and 2011.

== Statistics ==
=== Most runs ===
Player	Team	Mat	Inns	Runs	HS
KL Rahul	Kings XI Punjab	14	14	670	132*
Shikhar Dhawan	Delhi Capitals	17	17	618	106*
David Warner	Sunrisers Hyderabad	16	16	548	85*
Shreyas Iyer	Delhi Capitals	17	17	519	88*
Ishan Kishan	Mumbai Indians	14	13	516	99

- Source: IPLT20.com
- K. L. Rahul of Kings XI Punjab received the Orange Cap.

=== Most wickets ===
Player	Team	Mat	Inns	Wkts	BBI
Kagiso Rabada	Delhi Capitals	17	17	30	4/24
Jasprit Bumrah	Mumbai Indians	15	15	27	4/14
Trent Boult	Mumbai Indians	15	15	25	4/18
Anrich Nortje	Delhi Capitals	16	16	23	3/33
Yuzvendra Chahal	Royal Challengers Bangalore	15	15	21	3/18

- Source: IPLT20.com
- Kagiso Rabada of Delhi Capitals received the Purple Cap.

=== End of the season awards ===
Player	Team	Award	Prize
Devdutt Padikkal	Royal Challengers Bangalore	Emerging Player of the Season	₹10 lakh (US$11,000)
	Mumbai Indians	Fairplay Award	Team trophy
KL Rahul	Kings XI Punjab	Gamechanger award	₹10 lakh (US$11,000)
Kieron Pollard	Mumbai Indians	Super striker	₹10 lakh (US$11,000) and a car
Ishan Kishan	Mumbai Indians	Most sixes	₹10 lakh (US$11,000)
Trent Boult	Mumbai Indians	Power player	₹10 lakh (US$11,000)
Kagiso Rabada	Delhi Capitals	Most wickets	₹10 lakh (US$11,000)
KL Rahul	Kings XI Punjab	Most runs	₹10 lakh (US$11,000)
Jofra Archer	Rajasthan Royals	Most Valuable Player	₹10 lakh (US$11,000)
