= List of international cricket centuries by Kevin Pietersen =

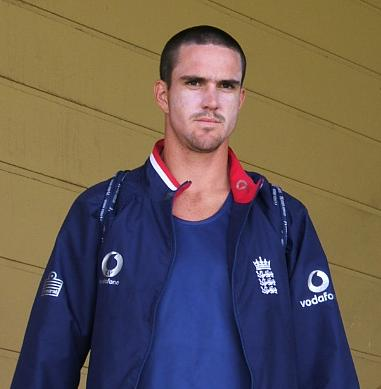
Kevin Pietersen has scored 32 centuries for England.

Kevin Pietersen is a retired English cricketer and former captain of the England cricket team. He has scored centuries (100 or more runs in a single innings) in Test and One Day International (ODI) matches, on twenty-three and nine occasions respectively. As of 1 January 2013, Pietersen has played 104 Tests and 136 ODIs for England, scoring 8,181 and 4,440 runs respectively and is the first batsman to reach 5,000 or more runs in Test cricket in under five years. His performances in the 2005 Ashes series led to Pietersen being named one of five Wisden Cricketers of the Year for 2006 and being appointed a Member of the Order of the British Empire (MBE) in the 2006 New Year Honours.

Pietersen made his Test debut against Australia in July 2005, when he was called into the team to replace Graham Thorpe for the first Test of the 2005 Ashes series. He made his first century during the fifth Test of the series at The Oval; his 158 in the third innings enabled England to draw the match and win the series 2–1. His career best score of 227 also came against Australia in the second Test of the 2010–11 Ashes series at the Adelaide Oval. Pietersen has scored centuries against all Test cricket playing nations, with the exception of Bangladesh and Zimbabwe. He is most successful against India, against whom he has scored six centuries. He is joint twenty-third among all-time Test century makers,^{[A]} and second in the equivalent list for England.

Pietersen made his ODI debut in 2004 against Zimbabwe at the Harare Sports Club. His first century was against South Africa at Goodyear Park, Bloemfontein in February 2005. His highest ODI score is 130 against Pakistan in February 2012 at the DSC Cricket Stadium, Dubai. Pietersen played 37 Twenty20 International (T20I) matches since his debut in 2005, without scoring a century. His highest score in the format was 79 against Zimbabwe, in September 2007.

== Key ==
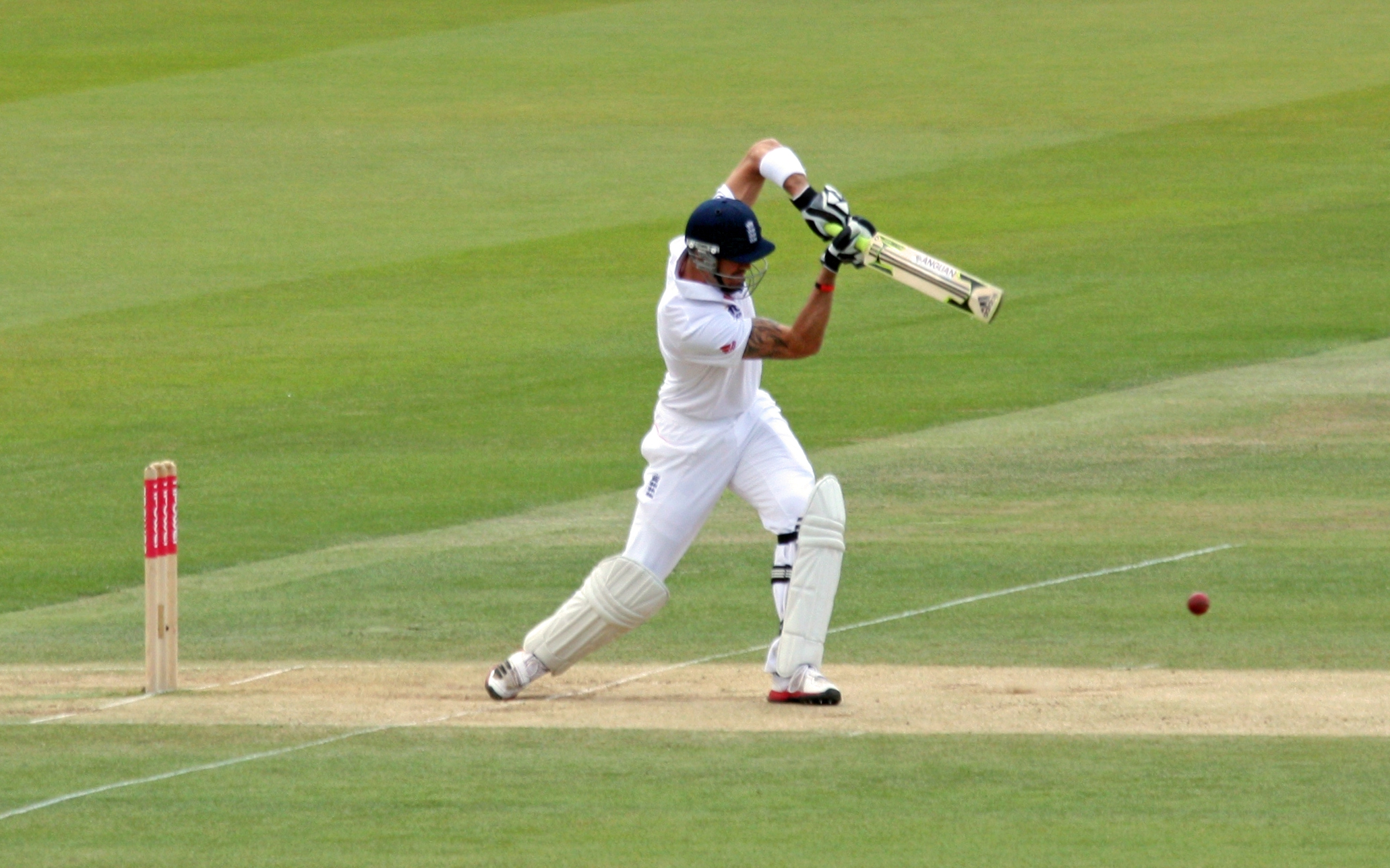
Pietersen batting against Sri Lanka at Lord's in 2011

Key
Symbol	Meaning
*	Remained not out
†	Man of the match
Balls	Balls faced
Pos.	Position in the batting order
Inn.	The innings of the match
Test	The number of the Test match played in that series
S/R	Strike rate during the innings
H/A/N	Venue was at home (England), away or neutral
Date	Date the match was held, or the starting date of match for Test matches
Lost	The match was lost by England.
Won	The match was won by England.
Drawn	The match was drawn.
Tied	The match was tied.

== Test centuries ==
List of Test centuries scored by Kevin Pietersen
No.	Score	Against	Pos.	Inn.	Test	Venue	H/A/N	Date	Result	Ref
1	158 ^{†}	Australia	5	3	5/5	The Oval, London	Home	8 September 2005	Drawn	
2	100	Pakistan	5	2	2/3	Iqbal Stadium, Faisalabad	Away	20 November 2005	Drawn	
3	158	Sri Lanka	4	1	1/3	Lord's, London	Home	11 May 2006	Drawn	
4	142 ^{†}	Sri Lanka	4	2	2/3	Edgbaston, Birmingham	Home	25 May 2006	Won	
5	135	Pakistan	4	1	3/4	Headingley, Leeds	Home	4 August 2006	Won	
6	158	Australia	5	1	2/5	Adelaide Oval, Adelaide	Away	1 December 2006	Lost	
7	109	West Indies	4	1	1/4	Lord's, London	Home	17 May 2007	Drawn	
8	226 ^{†}	West Indies	4	1	2/3	Headingley, Leeds	Home	25 May 2007	Won	
9	134 ^{†}	India	4	3	1/3	Lord's, London	Home	19 July 2007	Drawn	
10	101	India	4	4	3/3	The Oval, London	Home	9 August 2007	Drawn	
11	129	New Zealand	4	1	3/3	McLean Park, Napier	Away	22 March 2008	Won	
12	115	New Zealand	4	1	3/3	Trent Bridge, Nottingham	Home	5 June 2008	Won	
13	152	South Africa	4	1	1/4	Lord's, London	Home	10 July 2008	Drawn	
14	100 ‡	South Africa	4	1	4/4	The Oval, London	Home	7 August 2008	Won	
15	144 ‡	India	4	3	2/2	Punjab Cricket Association Stadium, Mohali	Away	19 December 2008	Drawn	
16	102	West Indies	4	3	5/5	Queen's Park Oval, Port of Spain	Away	6 March 2009	Drawn	
17	227 ^{†}	Australia	4	2	2/5	Adelaide Oval, Adelaide	Away	3 December 2010	Won	
18	202* ^{†}	India	4	1	1/4	Lord's, London	Home	21 July 2011	Won	
19	175	India	4	1	4/4	The Oval, London	Home	18 August 2011	Won	
20	151	Sri Lanka	4	2	2/2	P Sara Oval, Colombo	Away	3 April 2012	Won	
21	149	South Africa	4	2	2/3	Headingley, Leeds	Home	2 August 2012	Drawn	
22	186 ^{†}	India	4	2	2/4	Wankhede Stadium, Mumbai	Away	23 November 2012	Won	
23	113	Australia	5	2	3/5	Old Trafford, Manchester	Home	1 August 2013	Drawn	

== ODI centuries ==
List of ODI centuries scored by Kevin Pietersen
No.	Score	Against	Pos.	Inn.	S/R	Venue	H/A/N	Date	Result	Ref
1	108* ^{†}	South Africa	5	1	112.50	Goodyear Park, Bloemfontein	Away	5 February 2005	Tied	
2	100*	South Africa	5	2	144.92	Buffalo Park, East London	Away	9 February 2005	Lost	
3	116 ^{†}	South Africa	5	1	105.45	SuperSport Park, Centurion	Away	13 February 2005	Lost	
4	104	Australia	4	1	85.24	Sir Vivian Richards Stadium, Antigua	Neutral	8 April 2007	Lost	
5	100 ^{†}	West Indies	4	2	109.89	Kensington Oval, Bridgetown	Away	21 April 2007	Won	
6	110* ^{†}	New Zealand	3	1	98.21	Riverside Ground, Chester-le-Street	Home	15 June 2008	Won	
7	111* ‡	India	3	1	86.71	Barabati Stadium, Cuttack	Away	26 November 2008	Lost	
8	111* ^{†}	Pakistan	2	2	113.26	DSC Cricket Stadium, Dubai	Neutral	18 February 2012	Won	
9	130 ^{†}	Pakistan	2	2	84.96	DSC Cricket Stadium, Dubai	Neutral	21 February 2012	Won	

== Notes ==
A. Pietersen is joint twenty-third in all-time Test century makers along with Hashim Amla, Justin Langer, Javed Miandad and Virender Sehwag.
