= Sheikh Zayed Cricket Stadium =

Cricket ground in the United Arab Emirates

Zayed Cricket Stadium ملعب زايد للكريكت
- ملعب زايد للكريكت
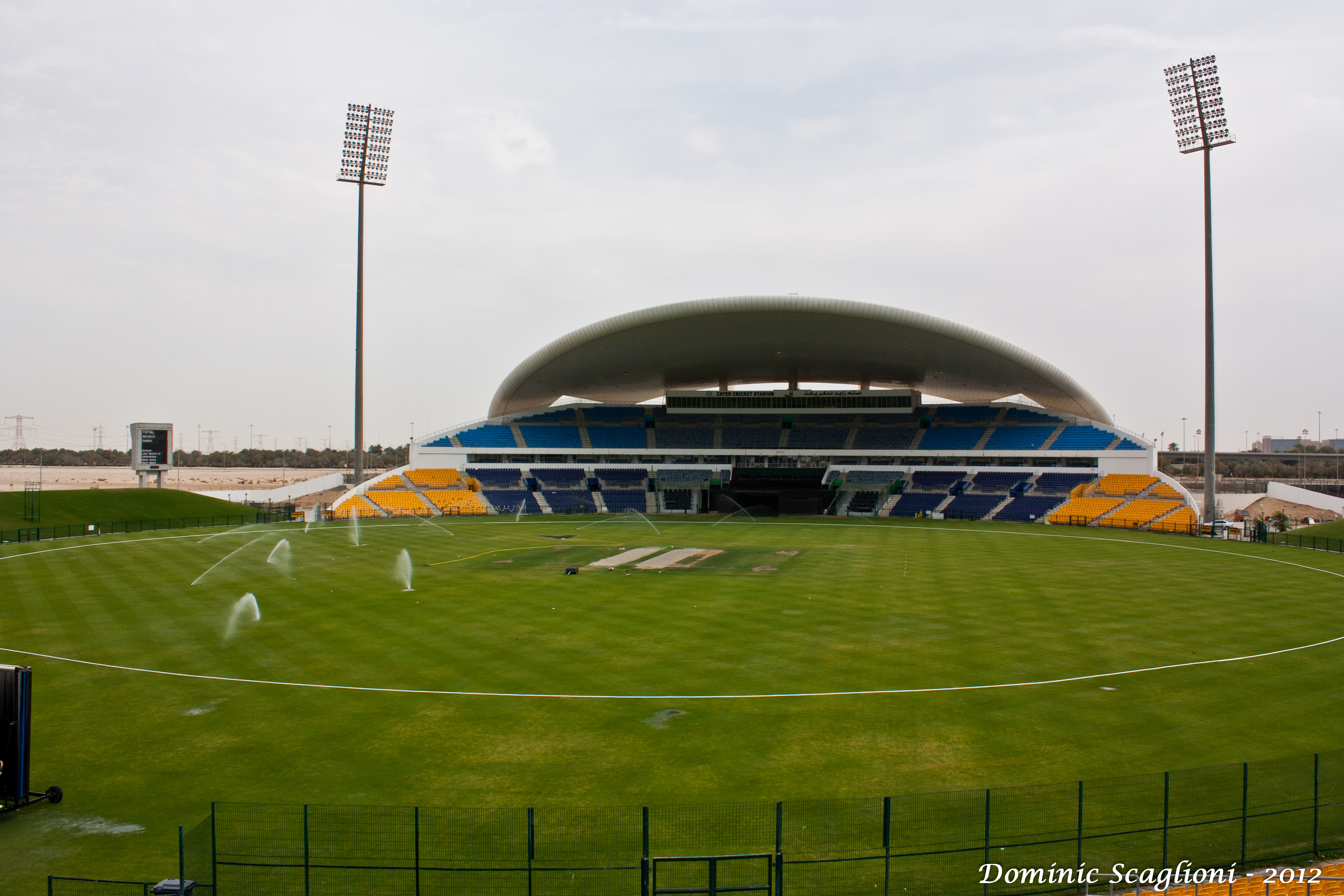
- Interactive map of Zayed Cricket Stadium ملعب زايد للكريكت

Ground information
- Location: Abu Dhabi, United Arab Emirates
- Country: United Arab Emirates
- Coordinates: 24°23′47″N 54°32′26″E
- Establishment: 2004; 22 years ago
- Capacity: 20,000
- Owner: Emirates Cricket Board
- Tenants: United Arab Emirates national cricket team Afghanistan national cricket team Abu Dhabi Knight Riders; MI Emirates
- End names
- North End; Pavilion End

International information
- First men's Test: 20–24 November 2010: Pakistan v South Africa
- Last men's Test: 10–14 March 2026: Afghanistan v Bangladesh
- First men's ODI: 18 April 2006: Pakistan v India
- Last men's ODI: 19 October 2026: Afghanistan v Zimbabwe
- First men's T20I: 10 February 2010: Afghanistan v Scotland
- Last men's T20I: 23 September 2025: Pakistan v Sri Lanka
- First women's T20I: 18 September 2022: United Arab Emirates v Thailand
- Last women's T20I: 7 May 2024: Scotland v Sri Lanka

Team information
Afghanistan national cricket team	(2009–present)
United Arab Emirates	(2010–present)
Abu Dhabi Knight Riders	(2023–present)
MI Emirates	(2023–present)
- As of 7 October 2024; Source: Cricinfo

The Sheikh Zayed Cricket Stadium (Arabic: ملعب زايد للكريكت) is a cricket ground located in Abu Dhabi, United Arab Emirates. The $23 million stadium, built by Concor, opened in May 2004, with its inaugural first-class match being an Intercontinental Cup fixture between Scotland and Kenya in November of that year. The stadium was one of the dedicated venues for the 2021 ICC Men's T20 World Cup.

The stadium has a large stand at either end, with the areas square of the wicket offering grass banks for additional seating. It can hold 20,000 people.

== International fixtures ==
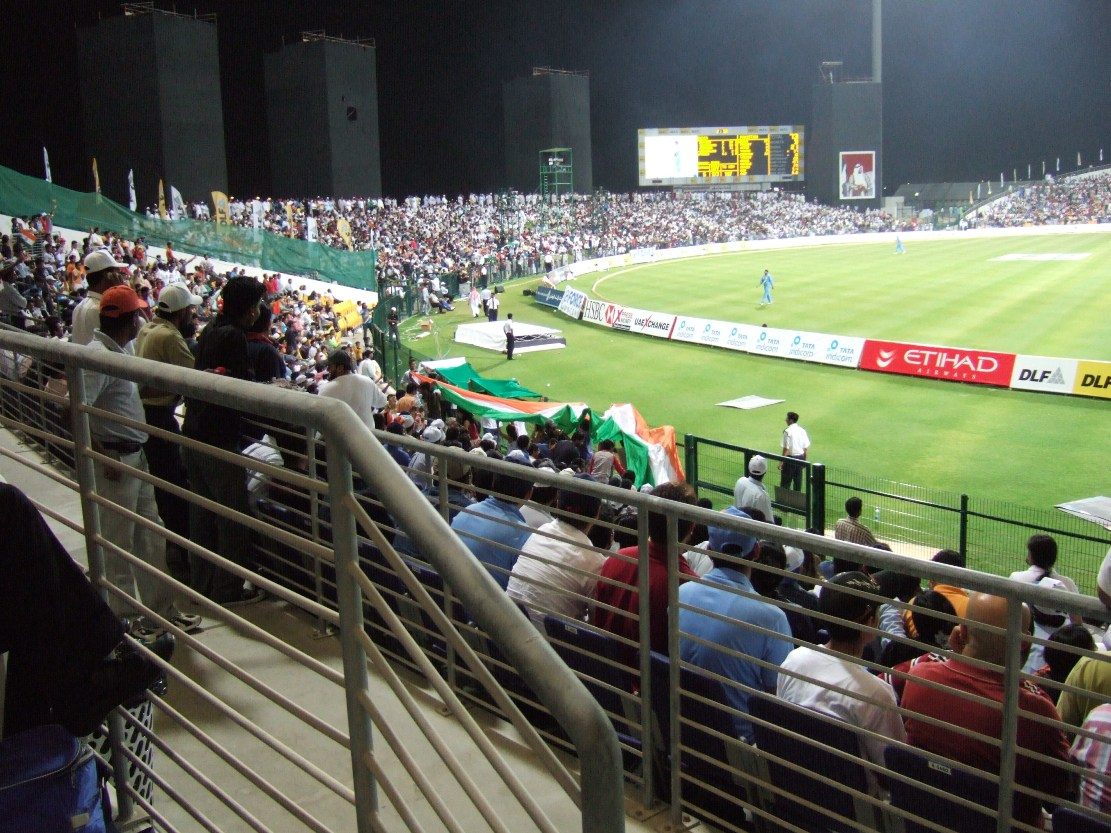
Pakistan playing against India at Abu Dhabi

Among the stadium's most memorable events were two charity matches between rivals Pakistan and India in April 2006. These matches were played to support the survivors of the 2005 Pakistan earthquake. The series was expected to raise $10 million for earthquake relief.

Many other international series have been played on the ground. Following the 2009 attack on the Sri Lanka national cricket team, Pakistan was unable to host home matches and played a number of home series matches in the UAE, including series against Australia, England, West Indies, New Zealand, South Africa and Sri Lanka.

=== ICC 2021 T20 World Cup ===
The 2021 ICC Men's T20 World Cup is the first ICC tournament to be hosted by the UAE. It began on 17 October and will run to 14 November. Four first round matches were hosted in Abu Dhabi, with 10 Super 12 matches and a semi-final also being held at the stadium.

=== Afghanistan National Cricket Team ===
Due to security concerns around playing matches against other international teams in Afghanistan itself (especially since the Talibans return to power in 2021), the Afghan National Cricket Team has played home matches at the stadium since 2010.

== Domestic fixtures ==
In 2009, the stadium hosted numerous cricket games, mostly fixtures in the Nissan Gulf Cup, with first-class teams from England and India competing against each other. In March 2009, Sussex, Lancashire, Middlesex and Surrey all played pre-season friendlies on the ground.

The first 20 games of total 60 games of the 2014 Indian Premier League was held in the UAE, with some matches taking place at the stadium. The 2020 Indian Premier League was played in the UAE from September to November, with 20 matches played at the stadium, including the opening match of the tournament. The second half of the next season's league was also played in the UAE from September to October 2021.

== Football fixtures ==
A friendly match between Thailand and Oman was played at the ground in January 2019.

== Nursery grounds ==
The stadium complex also features a pair of smaller grounds called Nursery 1 (also known as Tolerance Oval) and Nursery 2 (also known as Mohan's Oval). Mohan's Oval was used for a Twenty20 International between United Arab Emirates and Australia in October 2018. In September 2019, Tolerance Oval was named as one of the venues to host cricket matches for the 2019 ICC T20 World Cup Qualifier tournament.

Sheikh Zayed Stadium Nursery 2
- Mohan's Oval
- Interactive map of Sheikh Zayed Stadium Nursery 2

Ground information
- Location: Abu Dhabi, United Arab Emirates
- Country: United Arab Emirates
- Operator: Emirates Cricket Board
- Tenants: UAE national cricket team

International information
- Only men's T20I: 22 October 2018: United Arab Emirates v Australia
- As of 26 March 2024; Source: Mohan's Oval Cricinfo

== See also ==
- Abu Dhabi
- Abu Dhabi T10
- Sport in the United Arab Emirates
- DSC Cricket Stadium
- 2020 Indian Premier League
