= Murugan Ashwin =

Indian cricketer

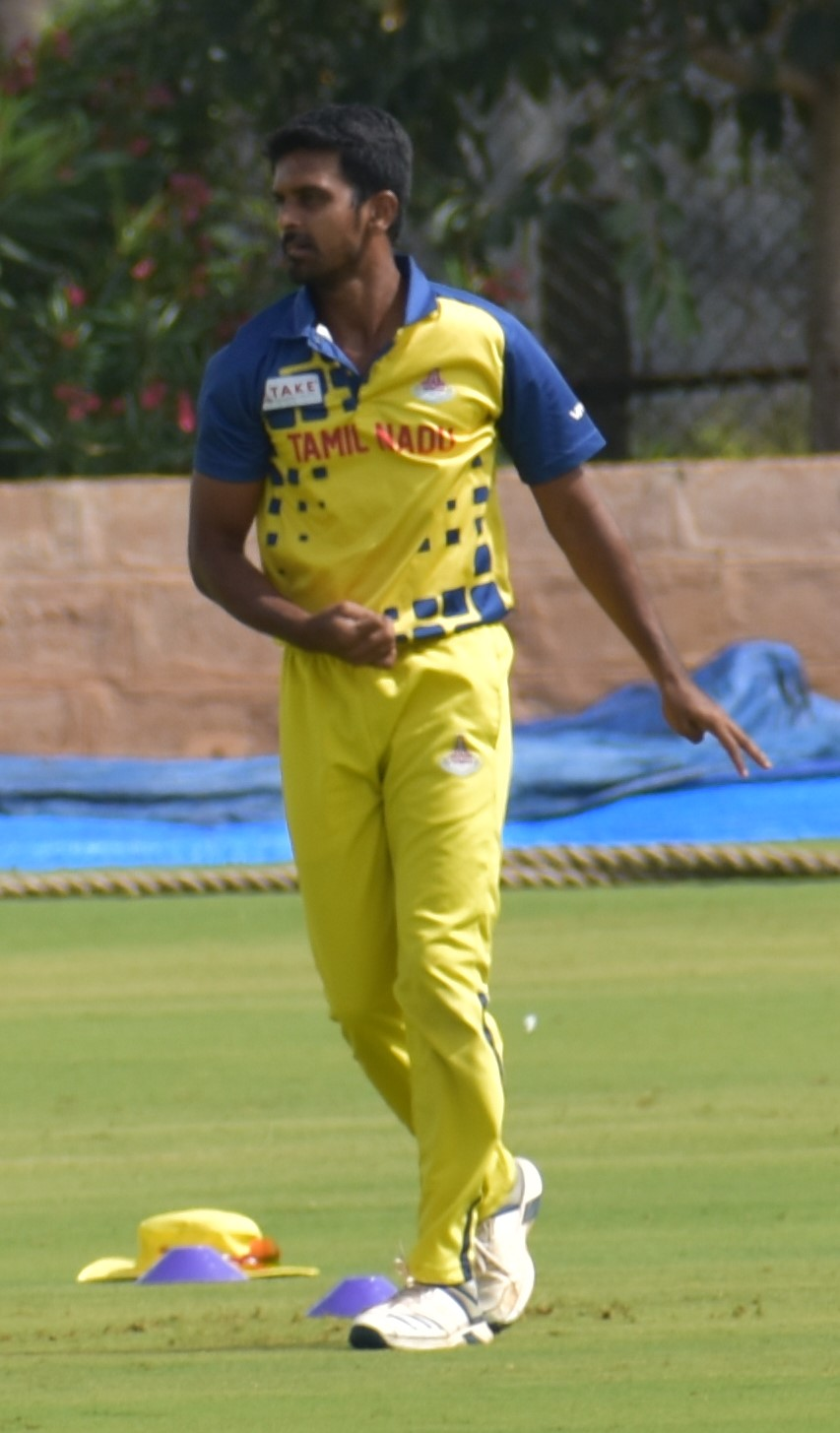
- Ashwin during the 2019–20 Vijay Hazare Trophy

Personal information
- Born: 8 September 1990 (age 36); Chennai, Tamil Nadu, India
- Batting: Right-handed
- Bowling: Right-arm leg break
- Role: Bowler

Domestic team information
- Years: Team
- 2012–2022: Tamil Nadu
- 2016: Rising Pune Supergiant
- 2018: Royal Challengers Bangalore
- 2019–2021: Punjab Kings
- 2022: Mumbai Indians
- 2023: Rajasthan Royals
- 2023–2024: Chandigarh
- 2025: Jammu and Kashmir

Career statistics
Competition	FC	LA	T20
Matches	7	29	105
Runs scored	82	113	146
Batting average	16.40	9.41	7.30
100s/50s	0/0	0/0	0/0
Top score	27	25*	34*
Balls bowled	861	1,140	2,163
Wickets	1	28	101
Bowling average	582.00	39.53	26.01
5 wickets in innings	0	0	0
10 wickets in match	0	0	0
Best bowling	1/176	3/14	3/8
Catches/stumpings	1/–	12/–	31/–
- Source: ESPNcricinfo, 23 May 2024

Murugan Ashwin (born 8 September 1990) is an Indian cricketer who plays for Chandigarh having previously represented Tamil Nadu.

== Domestic career ==
Ashwin made his List A debut on 11 December 2015 in the 2015–16 Vijay Hazare Trophy. He made his Twenty20 debut on 2 January 2016 in the 2015–16 Syed Mushtaq Ali Trophy.

== Indian Premier League ==
Ashwin was bought at the 2016 Indian Premier League auction by the Rising Pune Supergiants for INR 4.5 crores from his base price of INR 10 lakhs. In February 2017, in the 2017 IPL auction, Ashwin was bought by the Delhi Daredevils team for the 2017 Indian Premier League for INR 1 crore.

In January 2018, Ashwin was bought by the Royal Challengers Bangalore in the 2018 IPL auction. In December 2018, he was bought by the Kings XI Punjab for the base price of INR 20 lakh in the player auction for the 2019 Indian Premier League.

In February 2022, he has been bought by the Mumbai Indians in the 2022 Indian Premier League auction.
