= Dubai International Cricket Stadium =

Cricket stadium

Dubai International Stadium
- Dubai Sports City Stadium
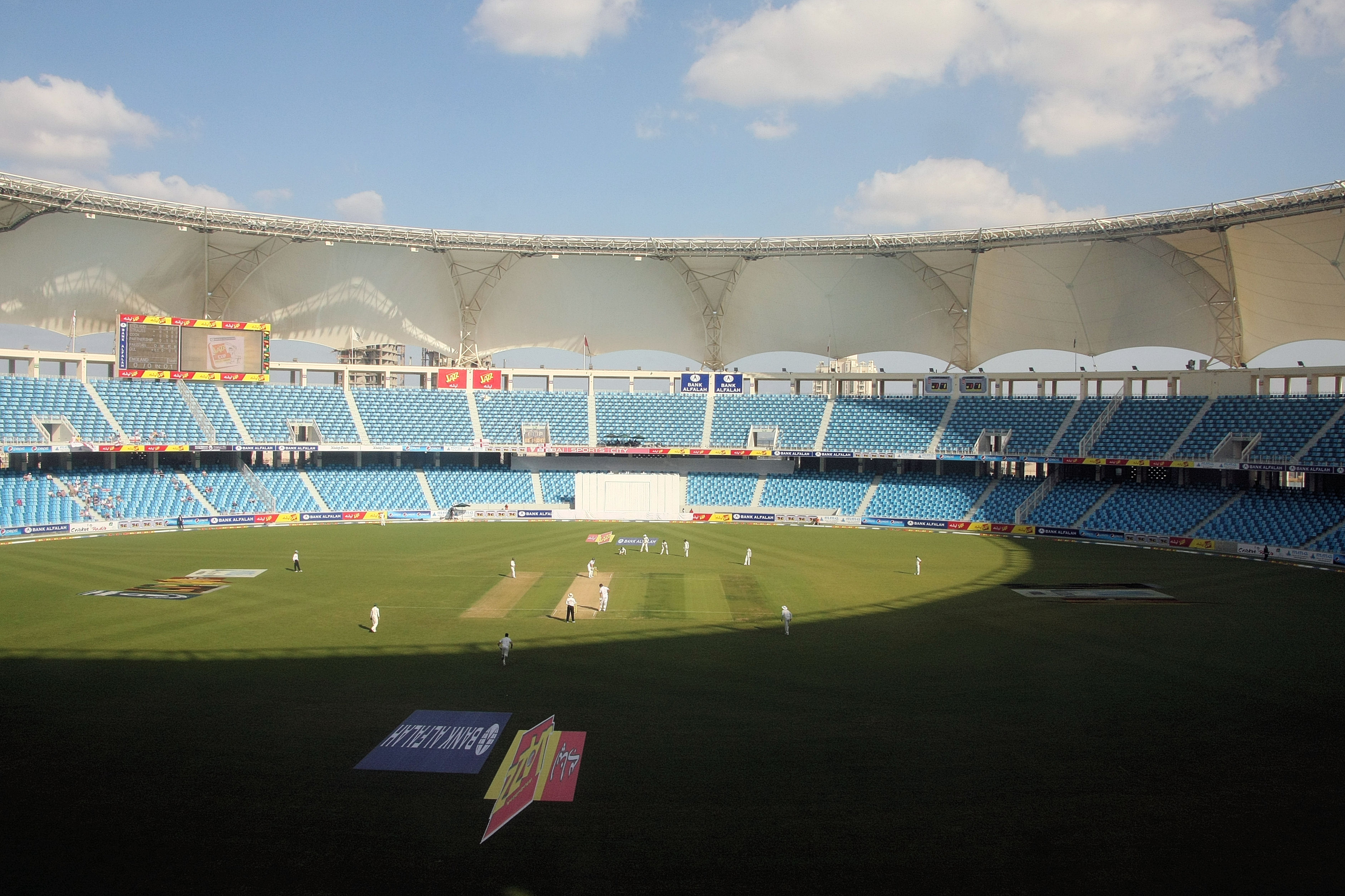
- Interactive map of Dubai International Stadium

Ground information
- Coordinates: 25°2′48″N 55°13′8″E
- Establishment: 2009; 17 years ago
- Capacity: 25,000
- Owner: Dubai Properties; Emirates Cricket Board
- Architect: Awsam Matloob & Engr Mohamed Happy MEP Manager
- Operator: Dubai Sports City; Emirates Cricket Board
- Tenants: United Arab Emirates national cricket team; United Arab Emirates women's national cricket team; Desert Vipers; Dubai Capitals; Gulf Giants
- End names
- Emirates Road End; Dubai Sports City End

International information
- First men's Test: 12–16 November 2010: Pakistan v South Africa
- Last men's Test: 24–27 November 2018: Pakistan v New Zealand
- First men's ODI: 22 April 2009: Pakistan v Australia
- Last men's ODI: 9 March 2025: India v New Zealand
- First men's T20I: 7 May 2009: Pakistan v Australia
- Last men's T20I: 22 January 2026: Afghanistan v West Indies
- Only women's ODI: 7 February 2019: Pakistan v West Indies
- First women's T20I: 26 September 2023: United Arab Emirates v Namibia
- Last women's T20I: 13 September 2026: India v Sri Lanka

Team information
United Arab Emirates national cricket team	(2009-present)
United Arab Emirates women's national cricket team	(2009–present)
Desert Vipers (2023–present)
Dubai Capitals (2023–present)
Gulf Giants (2023–present)
- As of 28 September 2025; Source: Cricinfo

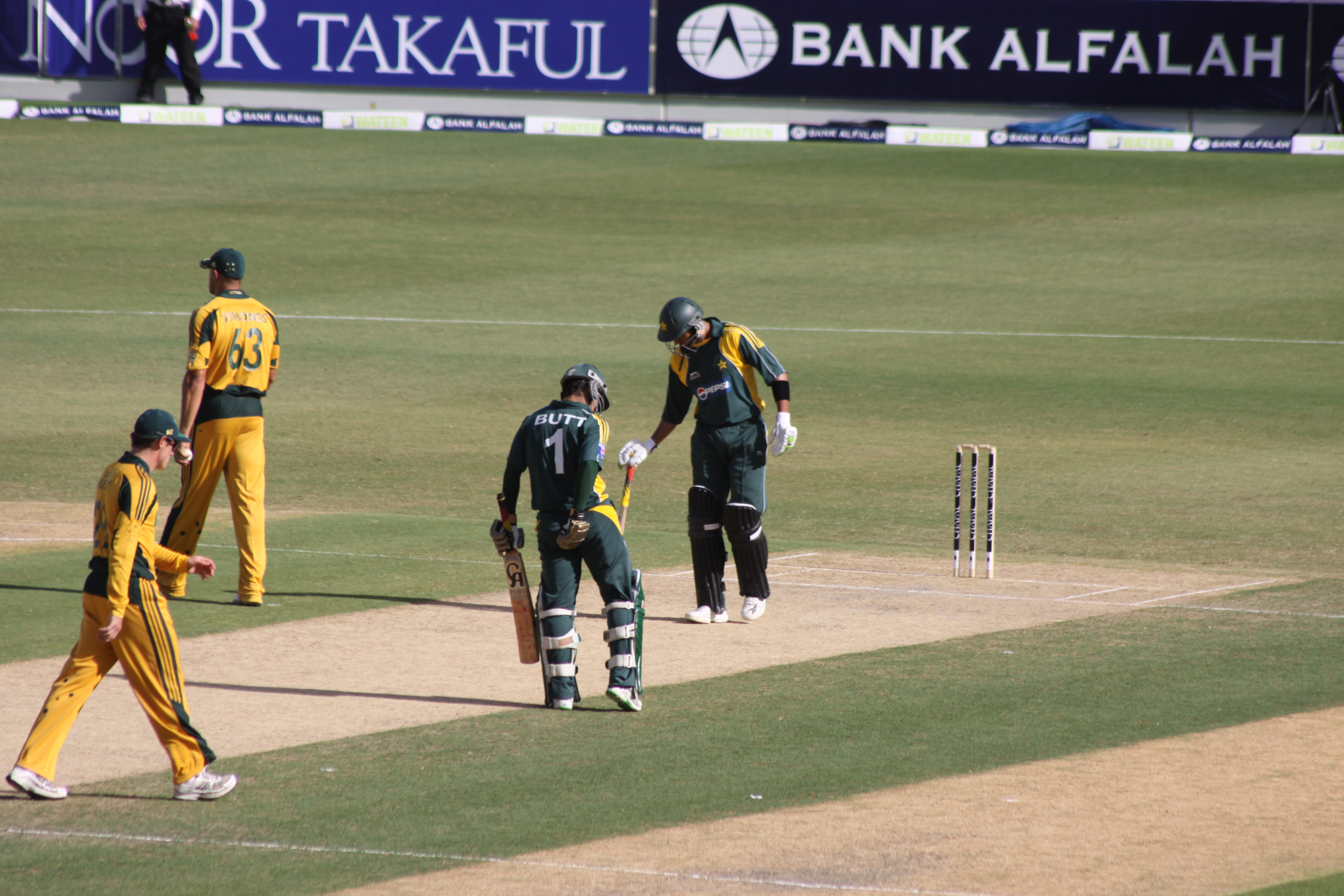
Dubai Sports City: Pakistan vs. Australia

The Dubai International Stadium, aka the Dubai Sports City Cricket Stadium, is a multi-purpose stadium in Dubai, United Arab Emirates. It is mainly used for cricket and is one of the three main cricket stadiums in the country, the other two being Sharjah Cricket Stadium in Sharjah and Sheikh Zayed Cricket Stadium in Abu Dhabi. It has seating capacity for 25,000 spectators, but it is expandable to accommodate 30,000 spectators. It is a part of the Dubai Sports City in Dubai. The architect of this project was the Canadian architect, Awsam Matloob. The stadium was one of the dedicated venues for the 2021 ICC T20 World Cup, it hosted semi-final 2 and the final on November 11, 2021, and November 15, 2021, respectively.

== Stadium History ==
The first ODI cricket match played here was between Australia and Pakistan on April 22, 2009; it was won by Pakistan. The stadium's first player to take a five-wicket haul was Shahid Afridi with 6/38, which was his career best figures at the time. The top score at this stadium is 302* is held by Azhar Ali against West Indies in 2016.

The stadium hosted its first Test match when Pakistan played South Africa on 12–16 November 2010; the match resulted in a draw.

The November 2010 ODI series between Pakistan and South Africa ended with a 3–2 series win for South Africa. South Africa sealed the series with a 57 run win against Pakistan.

Pakistan held a series against New Zealand and one Twenty20 International against England. This followed with a five-match ODI series of which three matches were played at this stadium. The second match in the stadium was also the last match by Australian international all-rounder Andrew Symonds.

In 2012 Pakistan met England in the first test at Dubai. Pakistan won it easily, by 10 wickets. Saeed Ajmal was the Man-of-the-Match, after his outstanding 10 wicket haul.

In 2012 in mid-August Pakistan played three T20s against Australia, which was a grand success, just before the ICC World T20, including a super over in the final match, which Pakistan won.

In 2014, The 2014 Indian Premier League tournament was held in the stadium along with Zayed Cricket Stadium and Sharjah Cricket Association Stadium. After that, the tournament shifted back to homeland India.

In September 2019, it was named as one of the venues to host cricket matches for the 2019 ICC T20 World Cup Qualifier tournament.

Along with Abu Dhabi and Sharjah the stadium was used to host the IPL 2020 as well as the second half of the 2021 tournament after it was initially postponed following a COVID-19 outbreak in India. In IPL 2020 Dubai International Stadium played host to the final as Mumbai Indians defeated Delhi Capitals and in 2021 Chennai Super Kings defeated Kolkata Knight Riders in the finals.

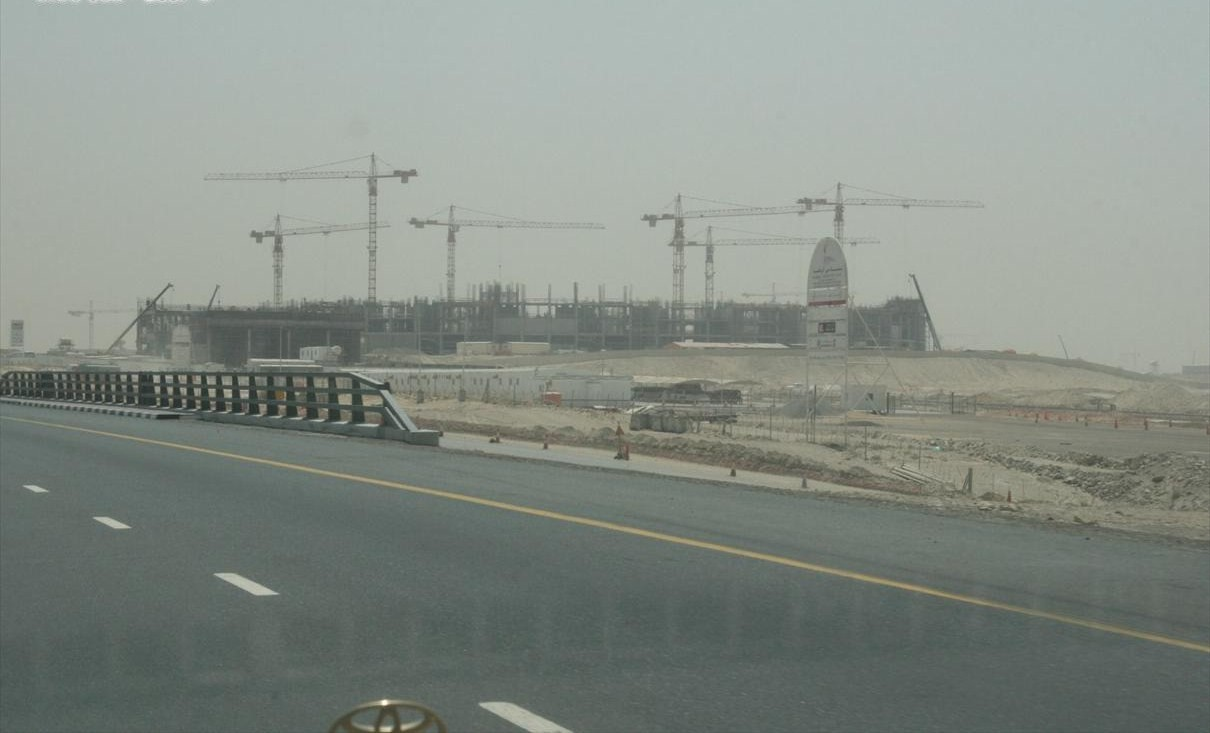
Cricket Stadium at Dubai Sports City under construction on 14 June 2007

The pitch conditions for T20 cricket in Dubai were significantly improved during IPL 2020, witnessed by a higher average T20 score in Dubai in that tournament by comparison to matches in the past.

== Lighting system ==
The Dubai International Stadium is lit by a special system of floodlights named "Ring of Fire". The 350 floodlights are installed around the circumference of its round roof, thereby minimizing the shadows of objects on the ground and needing no floodlight towers.

== Events ==
- Hosted two back-to-back day-night Test matches, first between Pakistan and West Indies, and then between Pakistan and Sri Lanka.
- Hosted 2 ODI matches between Pakistan and Australia from 22 to 24 April 2009.
- Hosted 2 Twenty20 matches between Pakistan and New Zealand from 12 to 13 November 2009.
- Hosted 3 Indian musical concerts on 1 and 2 November 2009 and 2 December 2013.
- Hosted 2 Twenty20 matches between Pakistan and England from 13 to 14 February 2010.
- The Els Club, located in Dubai Sports City hosted Callaways Odyssey.
- Dubai Sports city hosted World Twenty20 qualifier matches in February 2010.
- Hosted 3 ODI matches between Pakistan and South Africa from 2 to 8 November 2010.
- Hosted a Test match between Pakistan and South Africa on 12 November 2010.
- Hosted 7th Edition of IPL 2014 First Phase, due the 2014 Indian general election between 16 April and 30 April 2014.
- Hosted 2017 Desert T20 Challenge.
- Hosted PSL (Pakistan Super League 2016) with Opening ceremony & Final.
- Hosted PSL (Pakistan Super League 2017) with Opening ceremony.
- Hosted PSL (Pakistan Super League 2018) with Opening ceremony.
- Hosted 2018 Asia Cup and 2018 Asia Cup Final.
- Hosted PSL (Pakistan Super League 2019) with Opening ceremony.
- Hosted IPL (Indian Premier League 2020) Due to COVID-19 pandemic in India.
- Hosted IPL (Indian Premier League 2021) 2nd Phase due to Covid-19 in India.
- 1st time to host an ICC Tournament 2021 ICC Men's T20 World Cup with Oman.
- Hosted 2022 Asia Cup
- Hosted 2024 ICC Women's T20 World Cup
- Hosted 2025 ICC Champions Trophy For All A Group stage Matches and Semi Final & Final Matches of India due to Indian government policy on bilateral ties with Pakistan as well as security concerns in Pakistan.
- Hosted 2025 Asia Cup, Asia Cup hosted it for 3rd Time
- Hosted 2026 Women's Asia Cup for the first time.

== See also ==
- Sharjah Cricket Stadium
