= 2020 Kolkata Knight Riders season =

Cricket league season in India

Kolkata Knight Riders
2020 season
- Coach: Brendon McCullum
- Captain: Eoin Morgan (matches 8–14 matches); Dinesh Karthik (matches 1–7)
- Ground(s): Sheikh Zayed Cricket Stadium, Abu Dhabi
- 2020 Indian Premier League: 5th
- Most runs: Shubman Gill (440 Runs)
- Most wickets: Varun Chakravarthy (17 Wickets)

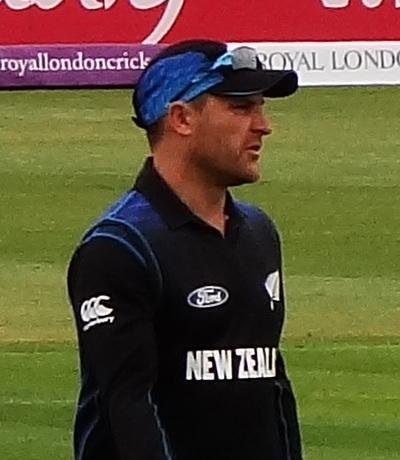
Brendon McCullum was appointed as the head coach of KKR In 2020.

The 2020 season was the 13th season for the Indian Premier League (IPL) franchise Kolkata Knight Riders (KKR). They were one of the eight teams that competed in the 2020 Indian Premier League. The franchise previously qualified for the IPL playoffs in 2011 and won the tournament in 2012 and 2014. The team was captained by Eoin Morgan with Brendon McCullum as the new team coach. The team finished 5th and could not qualify for the playoffs.

== Background ==
=== Player retention and transfers ===
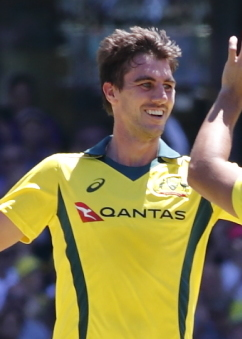
In 2020 auction, Pat Cummins has become the most expensive foreign player ever in IPL history.

The Kolkata Knight Riders retained 13 players and released ten players. On 12 September, Ali Khan becomes first USA cricketer to join IPL as replacement for Harry Gurney.

Retained
Dinesh Karthik, Andre Russell, Sunil Narine, Kuldeep Yadav, Shubman Gill, Lockie Ferguson, Nitish Rana, Rinku Singh, Prasidh Krishna, Sandeep Warrier, Harry Gurney, Kamlesh Nagarkoti, Shivam Mavi.
Released
Chris Lynn, Carlos Brathwaite, Nikhil Naik, KC Cariappa, Joe Denly, Shrikant Mundhe, Yarra Prithviraj, Anrich Nortje.
Acquired via trade
Siddhesh Lad.

=== Auction ===
KKR went into the auction with a budget of 35.65 crores INR. They bought Australian bowler Pat Cummins for 15.50 Cr, which was the highest amount ever for an overseas player at the auction. They also bought England captain Eoin Morgan (for 5.25 Cr), Rahul Tripathi, Tom Banton and Chris Green, and 48-year-old leg-spinner Praveen Tambe, who was bought at his base price of INR 20 lakhs.

Acquired at the auction
Pat Cummins, Eoin Morgan, Tom Banton, Rahul Tripathi, Varun Chakravarthy, Manimaran Siddharth, Nikhil Naik, Chris Green, Pravin Tambe.

=== Offseason ===
Brendon McCullum expressed happiness after being appointed KKR's coach, saying it was an honour for him.

On 13 March 2020, the BCCI postponed the tournament until 15 April, in view of the ongoing coronavirus pandemic. After Narendra Modi said that the lockdown in India would last until at least 3 May 2020, the BCCI suspended the tournament indefinitely.

On 24 May, Indian sports minister Kiren Rijiju stated that the decision on whether or not to allow the tournament to be conducted in 2020 would be made by the Indian government based on "the situation of the pandemic". In June 2020, the BCCI confirmed that their preference was to host the tournament in India, possibly between September and October. On 24 July 2020, it was confirmed that the tournament would start from 19 September 2020.

Australian player Chris Green was banned from bowling in January 2020 for three months, due to an illegal action. He had been bought by Kolkata Knight Riders at a base price of INR 20 lakhs. Whether or not he would participate in the IPL season would depend on the League's Governing Council approval. A senior BCCI official confirmed that leg-spinner Pravin Tambe would not play in the IPL 2020 since he had played in T10 league.

=== Team analysis ===
ESPNcricinfo wrote "Like most teams in the Indian Premier League, Kolkata Knight Riders also have a great playing XI, which has six bowling options and many impact players. The team has done an excellent job by buying Morgan, Banton and Green. However, Pat Cummins sold for a record amount will also be under pressure to perform well for him. Apart from this, the team has tremendous all-rounders in the form of Narine and Russell. The bowling attack of the team will decide how it performs in 2020."

Gautam Gambhir said on the Star Sports Cricket Live show:

If we look at the team as a whole, there is no alternative to Andre Russell, Eoin Morgan or Sunil Narine. The team has no middle-order batsman when Eoin Morgan gets hurt.

== Season summary ==
On 23 September, Kolkata Knight Riders lost the opening match against Mumbai Indians. Dinesh Karthik won the toss and elected to field. Rohit Sharma 80 off 54 balls and Suryakumar Yadav 47 off 28 balls, contributed to a score of 195. Chasing a target of 196, the team had lost two wickets in a five overs. Shivam Mavi 9 off 10 balls was stumped on the final ball of the match and Knight Riders could only score 146/9 in 20 overs, losing the match by 49 runs.

Kolkata Knight Riders won their next match against Sunrisers Hyderabad by 7 wickets. Dinesh Karthik lost the toss and was put to field. Manish Pandey scored 51 off 28 balls, helped the Sunrisers finish the innings at 142/4 in 20 overs. Chasing a target of 143, the Knight had lost two wickets in a first five overs, but Shubman Gill 70 off 62 balls brilliant inning and their 92-run partnership with Eoin Morgan, helped the Knight Riders to beat the Sunrisers.

On 21 October 2020, Kolkata Knight Riders owned an ignominious record of becoming the team that finished with the lowest total in their allotted 20 overs without getting bowled out in the Indian Premier League against Royal Challengers Bangalore.

After 7 matches in the season, KKR had a change of captain. Dinesh Karthik allegedly stepped down voluntarily as he wanted "to focus on his batting and contributing more to the team’s cause". Eoin Morgan was henceforth appointed as the captain.

The team could win only 3 games in the second half of the league stage and ended up with 14 points. They had 7 wins and 7 losses from their 14 games. Royal Challengers Bangalore and Sunrisers Hyderabad also ended with 14 points. However, a lower net run rate resulted in KKR being knocked out of the tournament before the playoffs.

== Squad ==
- Players with international caps are listed in **bold**.

No.	Name	Nationality	Birth date	Batting style	Bowling style	Year signed	Salary	Notes
Batsmen
27	Nitish Rana	India	27 December 1993 (aged 26)	Left-handed	Right-arm off break	2018	₹3.4 crore (US$353,000)	
77	**Shubman Gill**	India	8 September 1999 (aged 21)	Right-handed	Right-arm off break	2018	₹1.8 crore (US$187,000)	
35	Rinku Singh	India	12 October 1997 (aged 22)	Left-handed	Right-arm off break	2018	₹80 lakh (US$83,000)	
—N/a	Siddhesh Lad	India	23 May 1992 (aged 28)	Right-handed	Right-arm off-break	2020	₹20 lakh (US$21,000)	
16	**Eoin Morgan**	England	10 September 1986 (aged 34)	Left-handed	Right-arm medium	2020	₹5.25 crore (US$545,000)	Overseas
52	Rahul Tripathi	India	2 March 1991 (aged 29)	Right-handed	Right-arm fast medium	2020	₹60 lakh (US$62,000)	
All-rounders
12	**Andre Russell**	Jamaica	29 April 1988 (aged 32)	Right-handed	Right-arm fast-medium	2018	₹7 crore (US$726,897.50)	Overseas
74	**Sunil Narine**	Trinidad and Tobago	26 May 1988 (aged 32)	Left-handed	Right-arm off break	2018	₹8.5 crore (US$882,661.30)	Overseas
93	Chris Green	Australia	1 October 1993 (aged 26)	Right-handed	Right-arm off-break	2020	₹20 lakh (US$21,000)	Overseas
Wicket-keepers
19	**Dinesh Karthik**	India	1 June 1985 (aged 35)	Right-handed	Right-arm off break	2018	₹7.4 crore (US$768,434.50)	Captain until match 8
—N/a	**Tim Seifert**	New Zealand	14 December 1994 (aged 25)	Right-handed	Right-arm fast-medium	2020	₹20 lakh (US$21,000)	Overseas
18	**Tom Banton**	England	11 November 1998 (aged 21)	Right-handed	Right-arm off break	2020	₹1 crore (US$104,000)	Overseas
7	Nikhil Naik	India	9 November 1994 (aged 25)	Right-handed	Right-arm off break	2020	₹20 lakh (US$21,000)	
Spin Bowlers
23	**Kuldeep Yadav**	India	14 December 1994 (aged 25)	Left-handed	Slow left-arm wrist-spin	2018	₹5.8 crore (US$602,000)	
29	Varun Chakravarthy	India	29 August 1991 (aged 29)	Right-handed	Right-arm leg break	2020	₹4 crore (US$420,000)	
—N/a	Manimaran Siddharth	India	3 July 1998 (aged 22)	Right-handed	Left-arm orthodox	2020	₹20 lakh (US$21,000)	
Pace Bowlers
5	Kamlesh Nagarkoti	India	28 December 1999 (aged 20)	Right-handed	Right-arm fast	2018	₹3.2 crore (US$332,000)	
26	Shivam Mavi	India	26 November 1998 (aged 21)	Right-handed	Right-arm fast-medium	2018	₹3 crore (US$312,000)	
24	Prasidh Krishna	India	19 February 1996 (aged 24)	Right-handed	Right-arm fast-medium	2018	₹20 lakh (US$21,000)	
69	**Lockie Ferguson**	New Zealand	13 June 1991 (aged 29)	Right-handed	Right-arm fast	2019	₹1.6 crore (US$170,000)	Overseas
11	**Harry Gurney**	England	25 October 1986 (aged 33)	Right-handed	Left-arm fast-medium	2019	₹75 lakh (US$78,000)	Overseas
63	Sandeep Warrier	India	4 April 1991 (aged 29)	Right-handed	Right-arm medium-fast	2019	₹20 lakh (US$21,000)	
30	**Pat Cummins**	Australia	8 May 1993 (aged 27)	Right-handed	Right-arm fast	2020	₹15.5 crore (US$1.6 million)	Overseas
47	Ali Khan	United States	13 December 1990 (aged 29)	Right-handed	Right-arm fast-medium	2020	₹20 lakh (US$21,000)	Overseas

== Administration and support staff ==
Position	Name
Owner	Shah Rukh Khan (Red Chillies Entertainment), Jay Mehta, Juhi Chawla (Mehta Group)
CEO and Managing Director	Venky Mysore
Team manager	Wayne Bentley
Head coach	Brendon McCullum
Assistant coach	Abhishek Nayar
Bowling coach	Kyle Mills
Mentor	David Hussey
Fielding coach	James Foster
Strength and Conditioning coach	Chris Donaldson
Head Physiotherapist	Kamlesh Jain
Source: KKR Players

== Kit manufacturers and sponsors ==
=== Kits ===
Kit manufacturer	Shirt sponsor (chest)	Shirt sponsor (back)	Chest Branding
Lux Cozi	MPL	Jio	Lux Cozi
Source : www.kkr.in

T20 uniform

=== Sponsors ===
Principal Sponsor: MPL

== Teams and standings ==
=== Results by match ===
Round	1	2	3	4	5	6	7	8	9	10	11	12	13	14
Result	L	W	W	L	W	W	L	L	W	L	W	L	L	W
Position	8	5	2	5	3	3	4	4	4	4	4	5	5	4

Source: Fixtures
W = Win; D = Draw; L = Loss

=== League table ===
Pos	Team	Pld	W	L	NR	Pts	NRR	Qualification
1	Mumbai Indians (C)	14	9	5	0	18	1.107	Advance to Qualifier 1
2	Delhi Capitals (R)	14	8	6	0	16	−0.109	Advance to Qualifier 1
3	Sunrisers Hyderabad (3rd)	14	7	7	0	14	0.608	Advance to Eliminator
4	Royal Challengers Bangalore (4th)	14	7	7	0	14	−0.172	Advance to Eliminator
5	Kolkata Knight Riders	14	7	7	0	14	−0.214	
6	Kings XI Punjab	14	6	8	0	12	−0.162	
7	Chennai Super Kings	14	6	8	0	12	−0.455	
8	Rajasthan Royals	14	6	8	0	12	−0.569	

Source: IPLT20.com
The four top ranked teams qualify for the playoffs.

== League stage ==
23 September 2020
19:30 (D/N)
Scorecard

Mumbai Indians; 195/5 (20 overs)	v	Kolkata Knight Riders; 146/9 (20 overs)
Rohit Sharma 80 (54); Shivam Mavi 2/32 (4 overs)		Pat Cummins 33 (12); James Pattinson 2/25 (4 overs)

Mumbai Indians won by 49 runs
Sheikh Zayed Cricket Stadium, Abu Dhabi
Umpires: Chris Gaffaney (NZ) and Sundaram Ravi (Ind)
Player of the match: Rohit Sharma (Mumbai Indians)

- Kolkata Knight Riders won the toss and elected to field.

26 September 2020
19:30 (D/N)
Scorecard

Sunrisers Hyderabad; 142/4 (20 overs)	v	Kolkata Knight Riders; 145/3 (18 overs)
Manish Pandey 51 (38); Andre Russell 1/16 (2 overs)		Shubman Gill 70* (62); Rashid Khan 1/25 (4 overs)

Kolkata Knight Riders won by 7 wickets
Sheikh Zayed Cricket Stadium, Abu Dhabi
Umpires: Chris Gaffaney (NZ) and Virender Sharma (Ind)
Player of the match: Shubman Gill (Kolkata Knight Riders)

- Sunrisers Hyderabad won the toss and elected to bat.
- Kamlesh Nagarkoti (Kolkata Knight Riders) made his T20 debut.

30 September 2020
19:30 (D/N)
Scorecard

Kolkata Knight Riders; 174/6 (20 overs)	v	Rajasthan Royals; 137/9 (20 overs)
Shubman Gill 47 (34); Jofra Archer 2/18 (4 overs)		Tom Curran 54* (36); Kamlesh Nagarkoti 2/13 (2 overs)

Kolkata Knight Riders won by 37 runs
Dubai International Cricket Stadium, Dubai
Umpires: K. N. Ananthapadmanabhan (Ind) and Chettithody Shamshuddin (Ind)
Player of the match: Shivam Mavi (Kolkata Knight Riders)

- Rajasthan Royals won the toss and elected to field.

3 October 2020
19:30 (D/N)
Scorecard

Delhi Capitals; 228/4 (20 overs)	v	Kolkata Knight Riders; 210/8 (20 overs)
Shreyas Iyer 88* (38); Andre Russell 2/29 (4 overs)		Nitish Rana 58 (35); Anrich Nortje 3/33 (4 overs)

Delhi Capitals won by 18 runs
Sharjah Cricket Stadium, Sharjah
Umpires: Richard Illingworth (Eng) and Vineet Kulkarni (Ind)
Player of the match: Shreyas Iyer (Delhi Capitals)

- Kolkata Knight Riders won the toss and elected to field.

7 October 2020
19:30 (D/N)
Scorecard

Kolkata Knight Riders; 167 (20 overs)	v	Chennai Super Kings; 157/5 (20 overs)
Rahul Tripathi 81 (51); Dwayne Bravo 3/37 (4 overs)		Shane Watson 50 (40); Andre Russell 1/18 (2 overs)

Kolkata Knight Riders won by 10 runs
Sheikh Zayed Cricket Stadium, Abu Dhabi
Umpires: K. N. Ananthapadmanabhan (Ind) and Richard Illingworth (Eng)
Player of the match: Rahul Tripathi (Kolkata Knight Riders)

- Kolkata Knight Riders won the toss and elected to bat.

10 October 2020
15:30
Scorecard

Kolkata Knight Riders; 164/6 (20 overs)	v	Kings XI Punjab; 162/5 (20 overs)
Dinesh Karthik 58 (29); Ravi Bishnoi 1/25 (4 overs); Arshdeep Singh 1/25 (4 overs)		K. L. Rahul 74 (58); Prasidh Krishna 3/29 (4 overs)

Kolkata Knight Riders won by 2 runs
Sheikh Zayed Cricket Stadium, Abu Dhabi
Umpires: Chris Gaffaney (NZ) and Ulhas Gandhe (Ind)
Player of the match: Dinesh Karthik (Kolkata Knight Riders)

- Kolkata Knight Riders won the toss and elected to bat.

12 October 2020
19:30 (D/N)
Scorecard

Royal Challengers Bangalore; 194/2 (20 overs)	v	Kolkata Knight Riders; 112/9 (20 overs)
AB de Villiers 73* (33); Prasidh Krishna 1/42 (4 overs)		Shubman Gill 34 (25); Chris Morris 2/17 (4 overs)

Royal Challengers Bangalore won by 82 runs
Sharjah Cricket Stadium, Sharjah
Umpires: Richard Illingworth (Eng) and Krishnamachari Srinivasan (Ind)
Player of the match: AB de Villiers (Royal Challengers Bangalore)

- Royal Challengers Bangalore won the toss and elected to bat.

16 October 2020
19:30 (D/N)
Scorecard

Kolkata Knight Riders; 148/5 (20 overs)	v	Mumbai Indians; 149/2 (16.5 overs)
Pat Cummins 53* (36); Rahul Chahar 2/18 (4 overs)		Quinton de Kock 78* (44); Varun Chakravarthy 1/23 (4 overs)

Mumbai Indians won by 8 wickets
Sheikh Zayed Cricket Stadium, Abu Dhabi
Umpires: Chris Gaffaney (NZ) and Virender Sharma (Ind)
Player of the match: Quinton de Kock (Mumbai Indians)

- Kolkata Knight Riders won the toss and elected to bat.

18 October 2020
15:30 (D/N)
Scorecard

Kolkata Knight Riders; 163/5 (20 overs)	v	Sunrisers Hyderabad; 163/6 (20 overs)
Shubman Gill 36 (37); T. Natarajan 2/40 (4 overs)		David Warner 47* (33); Lockie Ferguson 3/15 (4 overs)

Match tied
(Kolkata Knight Riders won the Super Over)
Sheikh Zayed Cricket Stadium, Abu Dhabi
Umpires: Pashchim Pathak (Ind) and Sundaram Ravi (Ind)
Player of the match: Lockie Ferguson (Kolkata Knight Riders)

- Sunrisers Hyderabad won the toss and elected to field.
- Super Over: Sunrisers Hyderabad 2/2 (0.3 overs), Kolkata Knight Riders 3/0 (0.3 overs)
- David Warner (Sunrisers Hyderabad) became the fastest player to reach 5,000 IPL runs (in his 135th innings), as well as the first overseas player, and the fourth overall to reach this landmark.

21 October 2020
19:30 (D/N)
Scorecard

Kolkata Knight Riders; 84/8 (20 overs)	v	Royal Challengers Bangalore; 85/2 (13.3 overs)
Eoin Morgan 30 (34); Mohammed Siraj 3/8 (4 overs)		Devdutt Padikkal 25 (17); Lockie Ferguson 1/17 (4 overs)

Royal Challengers Bangalore won by 8 wickets
Sheikh Zayed Cricket Stadium, Abu Dhabi
Umpires: Sundaram Ravi (Ind) and Virender Sharma (Ind)
Player of the match: Mohammed Siraj (Royal Challengers Bangalore)

- Kolkata Knight Riders won the toss and elected to bat.
- Mohammed Siraj (Royal Challengers Bangalore) became the first bowler to bowl two maiden overs in an IPL match.

24 October 2020
15:30
Scorecard

Kolkata Knight Riders; 194/6 (20 overs)	v	Delhi Capitals; 135/9 (20 overs)
Nitish Rana 81 (53); Anrich Nortje 2/27 (4 overs)		Shreyas Iyer 47 (38); Varun Chakravarthy 5/20 (4 overs)

Kolkata Knight Riders won by 59 runs
Sheikh Zayed Cricket Stadium, Abu Dhabi
Umpires: Chris Gaffaney (NZ) and Pashchim Pathak (Ind)
Player of the match: Varun Chakravarthy (Kolkata Knight Riders)

- Delhi Capitals won the toss and elected to field.

26 October 2020
19:30 (D/N)
Scorecard

Kolkata Knight Riders; 149/9 (20 overs)	v	Kings XI Punjab; 150/2 (18.5 overs)
Shubman Gill 57 (45); Mohammed Shami 3/35 (4 overs)		Mandeep Singh 66* (56); Lockie Ferguson 1/32 (3.5 overs)

Kings XI Punjab won by 8 wickets
Sharjah Cricket Stadium, Sharjah
Umpires: K. N. Ananthapadmanabhan (Ind) and Richard Illingworth (Eng)
Player of the match: Chris Gayle (Kings XI Punjab)

- Kings XI Punjab won the toss and elected to field.

29 October 2020
19:30 (D/N)
Scorecard

Kolkata Knight Riders; 172/5 (20 overs)	v	Chennai Super Kings; 178/4 (20 overs)
Nitish Rana 87 (61); Lungi Ngidi 2/34 (4 overs)		Ruturaj Gaikwad 72 (53); Varun Chakravarthy 2/20 (4 overs)

Chennai Super Kings won by 6 wickets
Dubai International Cricket Stadium, Dubai
Umpires: Richard Illingworth (Eng) and Chettithody Shamshuddin (Ind)
Player of the match: Ruturaj Gaikwad (Chennai Super Kings)

- Chennai Super Kings won the toss and elected to field.
- Mumbai Indians qualified for the playoffs as a result of this match.

1 November 2020
19:30 (D/N)
Scorecard

Kolkata Knight Riders; 191/7 (20 overs)	v	Rajasthan Royals; 131/9 (20 overs)
Eoin Morgan 68* (35); Rahul Tewatia 3/25 (4 overs)		Jos Buttler 35 (22); Pat Cummins 4/34 (4 overs)

Kolkata Knight Riders won by 60 runs
Dubai International Cricket Stadium, Dubai
Umpires: Nitin Menon (Ind) and Paul Reiffel (Aus)
Player of the match: Pat Cummins (Kolkata Knight Riders)

- Rajasthan Royals won the toss and elected to field.
- Rajasthan Royals were eliminated as a result of this match.

== Statistics ==
=== Most runs ===
No.	Name	Match	Inns	NO	Runs	HS	Ave.	BF	SR	100s	50s	4s	6s
1	Shubman Gill	14	14	1	440	70*	33.84	373	117.96	0	3	44	9
2	Eoin Morgan	14	14	4	418	68*	41.80	302	138.41	0	1	32	24
3	Nitish Rana	14	14	0	352	87	25.14	254	138.58	0	3	43	12
4	Rahul Tripathi	11	11	1	230	81	23.00	181	127.07	0	1	21	10
5	Dinesh Karthik	14	14	2	169	58	14.08	134	126.11	0	1	20	4
6	Pat Cummins	14	11	4	146	53*	20.85	114	128.07	0	1	9	8
7	Sunil Narine	10	9	0	121	64	13.44	85	142.35	0	0	10	8
8	Andre Russell	10	9	0	117	25	13.00	81	144.44	0	0	9	9

- Source:iplt20

=== Most wickets ===
No.	Name	Match	Inns	Overs	Runs	Wickets	BBI	Avg.	Econ.	SR	4W	5W
1	Varun Chakravarthy	13	13	52	356	17	20/5	20.94	6.84	18.35	0	1
2	Pat Cummins	14	14	52	409	12	34/4	34.08	7.86	26.00	1	0
3	Shivam Mavi	8	8	26	212	9	15/2	23.55	8.15	17.33	0	0
4	Lockie Ferguson	5	5	19.5	148	6	15/3	24.66	7.46	19.83	0	0
5	Andre Russell	10	7	18	175	6	29/2	29.16	9.72	18.00	0	0
6	Sunil Narine	10	10	38	302	5	28/2	60.40	7.94	45.60	0	0
7	Kamlesh Nagarkoti	9	9	26	231	5	13/2	46.20	8.88	31.20	0	0
8	Prasidh Krishna	6	6	17.3	164	4	29/3	41.00	9.37	26.25	0	0

- Source:iplt20

== Player of the match awards ==
No.	Date	Player	Opponent	Result	Contribution	Ref.
1	26 September 2020	Shubman Gill	Sunrisers Hyderabad	Won By 7 wickets	70* (62)	
2	30 September 2020	Shivam Mavi	Rajasthan Royals	Won By 37 runs	2/22 (4 overs)	
3	7 October 2020	Rahul Tripathi	Chennai Super Kings	Won by 10 runs	81 (51)	
4	10 October 2020	Dinesh Karthik	Kings XI Punjab	Won by 2 runs	58 (29)	
5	18 October 2020	Lockie Ferguson	Sunrisers Hyderabad	Won in super over	3/15 (4 overs)	
6	24 October 2020	Varun Chakravarthy	Delhi Capitals	Won by 59 runs	5/20 (4 overs)	
7	1 November 2020	Pat Cummins	Rajasthan Royals	Won by 60 runs	4/34 (4 overs)	
