= 2020 Royal Challengers Bangalore season =

Indian Premier League cricket team season

Royal Challengers Bangalore
2020 season
- Coach: Simon Katich
- Captain: Virat Kohli
- Ground(s): M. Chinnaswamy Stadium, Bengaluru
- League stage: 4th
- Eliminator: Lost
- Most runs: Devdutt Padikkal (473)
- Most wickets: Yuzvendra Chahal (21)

The 2020 season was the 13th season for the IPL cricket franchise Royal Challengers Bangalore. They were one of the eight teams to compete in the tournament.

On 14 February RCB revealed their new logo for the team which features a lion. On 2 November 2020, they qualified for the playoffs for the first time since 2016. However, they lost against Sunrisers Hyderabad in the Eliminator, finishing the tournament in 4th place.

== Background ==
=== Player retention and transfers ===
The Royal Challengers Bangalore retained 13 players and released eleven players. On 31 August 2020, Royal Challengers signed Adam Zampa to replace Kane Richardson.

Retained players: Virat Kohli, Moeen Ali, Yuzvendra Chahal, Parthiv Patel, Mohammed Siraj, Umesh Yadav, Pawan Negi, Devdutt Padikkal, Gurkeerat Singh Mann, Washington Sundar, Shivam Dube, Navdeep Saini, AB de Villiers.

Released players: Marcus Stoinis, Shimron Hetmyer, Akshdeep Nath, Nathan Coulter-Nile, Colin de Grandhomme, Shaheershah PH, Prayas Ray Barman, Tim Southee, Kulwant Khejroliya, Himmat Singh, Heinrich Klaasen, Milind Kumar.

=== Auction ===
RCB went in the auction with a purse of 27.90 Cr INR. RCB, the group that had a minimal number of players before the closeout purchased 8 additional players to take their count to 21 players; the least among every one of the groups. Their technique looked very perplexing despite the fact that they got some large names like Aaron Finch, Chris Morris, Dale Steyn, and Kane Richardson.

Players bought: Aaron Finch, Chris Morris, Shahbaz Ahmed, Pawan Deshpande, Joshua Philippe, Isuru Udana, Dale Steyn, Kane Richardson and Adam Zampa

=== Team analysis ===
ESPNcricinfo' wrote "Like Delhi Capitals, the team of Royal Challengers Bangalore could not find their favorite players on many occasions during the auction. This was the reason that he too had to move towards the second or third options. Captain Virat Kohli certainly has more bowling options this time, If the team lands with two foreign fast bowlers, then they will have to find an Indian option at the opening. If it is not, then the Indian player will be seen in fast bowling. Finding the right combination at the beginning of the tournament will be the key to RCB's win."

== Indian Premier League ==
On 21 September, the Royal Challengers Bangalore started their season campaign defeating Sunrisers Hyderabad by 10 runs. Virat Kohli lost the toss & was put to bat. Devdutt Padikkal ( 56) built the 90-run partnership with Aaron Finch (29) for the first wicket. Bangalore scored 163-run in 20 overs. Bangalore were able to restrict the Sunrisers to 153.

On 24 September, Royal Challengers lost their first match of the season from Kings XI Punjab by 97-run. Virat Kohli won the toss and elected to field. KL Rahul and Mayank Agarwal build the Kings XI innings with a 57-run stand for the first wicket. Rahul scored 132 off 69 balls with 14 fours and 7 sixes and helped the Kings XI finish the innings at 206/3 in 20 overs. Chasing a target of 207, the Royal Challengers had lost three wickets in the first four overs. Kings XI new ball pair of Sheldon Cottrell and Mohammed Shami continued their good work from the first match and Royal Challengers were eventually bowled out for 109. Rahul became the fastest Indian batsman to complete 2000 runs in IPL.

On 28 September, Royal Challengers won their second match against Mumbai Indians in a super over. Kohli lost the toss and was put to bat. Devdutt Padikkal and Aaron Finch built an 81-run partnership for the first wicket and after that, Kohli scored 3-run off 11 balls, in the last 7 overs Royal Challengers scored 105-run, helped the Royal Challengers finish the innings at 201/3 in 20 overs. Chasing a target of 202, the Mumbai Had had lost two wickets in a first two overs, but Ishan Kishan 99 off 58 balls brilliant inning and their 119-run partnership with Kieron Pollard to power their team finish the innings at 201/5 in 20 overs. In a super over Mumbai could manage only 7-run.

They defeated their arch-rivals Chennai Super Kings by 37 runs and Kolkata Knight Riders by 82 runs. The defeat margin was the same when Kolkata Knight Riders beat Royal Challengers Bangalore in 2017 by bowling them out for the lowest IPL score of 49. On their next faceoff, they thrashed Kolkata Knight Riders forcing them to score just 84/8. Royal Challengers Bangalore later on chased the score in 13.3 overs thereby winning by 8 wickets.

They also defeated Rajasthan Royals in both matches they played against them. RCB this season has lost only 4 matches being defeated 2 times against the Kings XI Punjab and 2 matches against the Delhi Capitals. After defeating KKR, Bangalore lost matches against table toppers Mumbai Indians and Sunrisers Hyderabad and their last match was against Delhi Capitals. They lost the match but made it to the playoffs owing to their good run rate. They played the eliminator against Sunrisers Hyderabad in which Hyderabad won the toss and elected to field first. Bangalore batted first and scored 131 for 7 in 20 overs. Hyderabad completed the chase with just 2 balls to spare which knocked Bangalore out of the tournament.

=== Offseason ===
The new logo for RCB and the New Jersey of the team was released on 14 February 2020. AB de Villiers, captain Virat Kohli, and spinner Yuzvendra Chahal were seen in the New Jersey. The new logo had a gold-colored lion with the traditional RCB red used around it.

On 13 March, the BCCI postponed the tournament until 15 April, in view of the ongoing coronavirus pandemic. On 14 April, India's Prime Minister Narendra Modi said that the lockdown in India would last until at least 3 May, with the tournament postponed further. The following day, the BCCI suspended the tournament indefinitely. The nationwide restrictions on sports events were relaxed on 17 May, allowing events to take place behind closed doors. On 24 May, India's sports minister Kiren Rijiju stated that the decision on whether or not to allow the tournament to be conducted that year would be made by the union government based on "the situation of the pandemic". In June, the BCCI confirmed that their preference was to host the tournament in India, possibly between September and October, and on 24 July, confirmed 19 September as the start.

=== Pre-season ===
On 17 September, it was announced that RCB team will play first match in the UAE, with 'My Covid Heroes' written on the back of the all players' jersey in honor of the Corona heroes.

== Squad ==
- Players with international caps are listed in **bold**.

No.	Name	Nationality	Birth date	Batting style	Bowling style	Year signed	Salary	Notes
Batsmen
18	**Virat Kohli**	India	5 November 1988 (aged 31)	Right-handed	Right-arm medium	2018	₹17 crore (US$1.8 million)	Captain
17	**AB de Villiers**	South Africa	17 February 1984 (aged 36)	Right-handed	Right-arm medium	2018	₹11 crore (US$1.1 million)	Overseas, Vice-captain, Occasional wicket-keeper
91	**Gurkeerat Singh**	India	29 June 1990 (aged 30)	Right-handed	Right-arm off break	2019	₹50 lakh (US$52,000)	
37	Devdutt Padikkal	India	7 July 2000 (aged 20)	Left-handed	Right-arm off break	2019	₹20 lakh (US$21,000)	
42	**Aaron Finch**	Australia	17 November 1986 (aged 33)	Right-handed	Slow left-arm orthodox	2020	₹4.4 crore (US$457,000)	Overseas
All-rounders
5	**Washington Sundar**	India	5 October 1999 (aged 20)	Left-handed	Right-arm off break	2018	₹3.2 crore (US$332,000)	
6	**Shivam Dube**	India	26 June 1993 (aged 27)	Left-handed	Right-arm medium-fast	2019	₹5 crore (US$519,000)	
81	**Moeen Ali**	England	18 June 1987 (aged 33)	Left-handed	Right-arm off break	2018	₹1.7 crore (US$177,000)	Overseas
15	**Pawan Negi**	India	6 January 1993 (aged 27)	Left-handed	Slow left-arm orthodox	2018	₹1 crore (US$104,000)	
—N/a	Pavan Deshpande	India	16 September 1989 (aged 31)	Left-handed	Right-arm off break	2020	₹20 lakh (US$21,000)	
45	**Chris Morris**	South Africa	30 April 1987 (aged 33)	Right-handed	Right-arm fast-medium	2020	₹10 crore (US$1.0 million)	Overseas
21	Shahbaz Ahmed	India	12 December 1994 (aged 25)	Left-handed	Slow left-arm orthodox	2020	₹20 lakh (US$21,000)	
Wicket-keepers
72	**Parthiv Patel**	India	9 March 1985 (aged 35)	Left-handed		2018	₹1.7 crore (US$177,000)	
1	Josh Philippe	Australia	1 June 1997 (aged 23)	Right-handed		2020	₹20 lakh (US$21,000)	Overseas
Spin Bowlers
3	**Yuzvendra Chahal**	India	23 July 1990 (aged 30)	Right-handed	Right-arm leg break	2018	₹6 crore (US$623,000)	
36	**Adam Zampa**	Australia	31 March 1992 (aged 28)	Right-handed	Right-arm leg break	2020	₹1.5 crore (US$156,000)	Overseas
Pace Bowlers
19	**Umesh Yadav**	India	25 October 1987 (aged 32)	Right-handed	Right-arm fast	2018	₹4.2 crore (US$436,000)	
96	**Navdeep Saini**	India	23 November 1993 (aged 26)	Right-handed	Right-arm fast	2018	₹3 crore (US$312,000)	
73	**Mohammed Siraj**	India	13 March 1994 (aged 26)	Right-handed	Right-arm fast-medium	2018	₹2.6 crore (US$270,000)	
—N/a	**Kane Richardson**	Australia	12 February 1991 (aged 29)	Right-handed	Right-arm fast-medium	2020	₹4 crore (US$415,000)	Overseas
27	**Dale Steyn**	South Africa	27 June 1983 (aged 37)	Right-handed	Right-arm fast	2020	₹2 crore (US$208,000)	Overseas
50	**Isuru Udana**	Sri Lanka	17 February 1988 (aged 32)	Right-handed	Left-arm fast-medium	2020	₹50 lakh (US$52,000)	Overseas

== Administration and support staff ==
Position	Name
Owner	Anand Kripalu (United Spirits Limited)
CEO	Anand Kripalu
Chairman	Sanjeev Churiwala
Team manager	Soumyadeep Pyne
Director of cricket operations	Mike Hesson
Head coach	Simon Katich
Bowling coach	Adam Griffith
Batting and spin bowling coach	Sridharan Sriram
Head of scouting and fielding coach	Malolan Rangarajan
Head physiotherapist	Evan Speechly
Strength and conditioning coach	Basu Shanker
Team doctor	Dr. Charles Minz

== Kit manufacturers and sponsors ==
Kit manufacturer	Shirt sponsor (chest)	Shirt sponsor (back)	Shirt sponsor (chest)
Wrogn Active	Muthoot Fincorp	DP World	Myntra
Source :

Home kit

== Teams and standings ==
=== Results by match ===
Round	1	2	3	4	5	6	7	8	9	10	11	12	13	14
Result	W	L	W	W	L	W	W	L	W	W	L	L	L	L
Position	1	6	3	1	3	4	3	3	3	2	3	2	2	4

Source: Fixtures
W = Win; D = Draw; L = Loss

=== League table ===
Pos	Team	Pld	W	L	NR	Pts	NRR	Qualification
1	Mumbai Indians (C)	14	9	5	0	18	1.107	Advance to Qualifier 1
2	Delhi Capitals (R)	14	8	6	0	16	−0.109	Advance to Qualifier 1
3	Sunrisers Hyderabad (3rd)	14	7	7	0	14	0.608	Advance to Eliminator
4	Royal Challengers Bangalore (4th)	14	7	7	0	14	−0.172	Advance to Eliminator
5	Kolkata Knight Riders	14	7	7	0	14	−0.214	
6	Kings XI Punjab	14	6	8	0	12	−0.162	
7	Chennai Super Kings	14	6	8	0	12	−0.455	
8	Rajasthan Royals	14	6	8	0	12	−0.569	

Source: IPLT20.com
The four top ranked teams qualify for the playoffs.

==== League stage ====
21 September 2020
19:30 (D/N)
Scorecard

Royal Challengers Bangalore; 163/5 (20 overs)	v	Sunrisers Hyderabad; 153 (19.4 overs)
Devdutt Padikkal 56 (42); Vijay Shankar 1/14 (1.2 overs)		Jonny Bairstow 61 (43); Yuzvendra Chahal 3/18 (4 overs)

Royal Challengers Bangalore won by 10 runs
Dubai International Cricket Stadium, Dubai
Umpires: Anil Dandekar (Ind) and Nitin Menon (Ind)
Player of the match: Yuzvendra Chahal (Royal Challengers Bangalore)

- Sunrisers Hyderabad won the toss and elected to field.

24 September 2020
19:30 (D/N)
Scorecard

Kings XI Punjab; 206/3 (20 overs)	v	Royal Challengers Bangalore; 109 (17 overs)
K. L. Rahul 132* (69); Shivam Dube 2/33 (3 overs)		Washington Sundar 30 (27); Murugan Ashwin 3/21 (3 overs)

Kings XI Punjab won by 97 runs
Dubai International Cricket Stadium, Dubai
Umpires: Anil Chaudhary (Ind) and Paul Reiffel (Aus)
Player of the match: K. L. Rahul (Kings XI Punjab)

- Royal Challengers Bangalore won the toss and elected to field.
- K. L. Rahul (Kings XI Punjab) scored the highest total by an Indian batsman in the IPL, and the highest total by a team captain in the IPL.

28 September 2020
19:30 (D/N)
Scorecard

Royal Challengers Bangalore; 201/3 (20 overs)	v	Mumbai Indians; 201/5 (20 overs)
AB de Villiers 55* (24); Trent Boult 2/34 (4 overs)		Ishan Kishan 99 (58); Isuru Udana 2/45 (4 overs)

Match tied
(Royal Challengers Bangalore won the Super Over)
Dubai International Cricket Stadium, Dubai
Umpires: Nitin Menon (Ind) and Paul Reiffel (Aus)
Player of the match: AB de Villiers (Royal Challengers Bangalore)

- Mumbai Indians won the toss and elected to field.
- Super Over: Mumbai Indians 7/1 (1 over), Royal Challengers Bangalore 11/0 (1 over)

3 October 2020
15:30
Scorecard

Rajasthan Royals; 154/6 (20 overs)	v	Royal Challengers Bangalore; 158/2 (19.1 overs)
Mahipal Lomror 47 (39); Yuzvendra Chahal 3/24 (4 overs)		Virat Kohli 72* (53); Jofra Archer 1/18 (4 overs)

Royal Challengers Bangalore won by 8 wickets
Sheikh Zayed Cricket Stadium, Abu Dhabi
Umpires: Chris Gaffaney (NZ) and Sundaram Ravi (Ind)
Player of the match: Yuzvendra Chahal (Royal Challengers Bangalore)

- Rajasthan Royals won the toss and elected to bat.

5 October 2020
19:30 (D/N)
Scorecard

Delhi Capitals; 196/4 (20 overs)	v	Royal Challengers Bangalore; 137/9 (20 overs)
Marcus Stoinis 53* (26); Mohammed Siraj 2/34 (4 overs)		Virat Kohli 43 (39); Kagiso Rabada 4/24 (4 overs)

Delhi Capitals won by 59 runs
Dubai International Cricket Stadium, Dubai
Umpires: Yeshwant Barde (Ind) and Nitin Menon (Ind)
Player of the match: Axar Patel (Delhi Capitals)

- Royal Challengers Bangalore won the toss and elected to field.
- Virat Kohli (Royal Challengers Bangalore) became the first Indian player to reach 9,000 T20 runs.

10 October 2020
19:30 (D/N)
Scorecard

Royal Challengers Bangalore; 169/4 (20 overs)	v	Chennai Super Kings; 132/8 (20 overs)
Virat Kohli 90* (52); Shardul Thakur 2/40 (4 overs)		Ambati Rayudu 42 (40); Chris Morris 3/19 (4 overs)

Royal Challengers Bangalore won by 37 runs
Dubai International Cricket Stadium, Dubai
Umpires: Anil Chaudhary (Ind) and Paul Reiffel (Aus)
Player of the match: Virat Kohli (Royal Challengers Bangalore)

- Royal Challengers Bangalore won the toss and elected to bat.

12 October 2020
19:30 (D/N)
Scorecard

Royal Challengers Bangalore; 194/2 (20 overs)	v	Kolkata Knight Riders; 112/9 (20 overs)
AB de Villiers 73* (33); Prasidh Krishna 1/42 (4 overs)		Shubman Gill 34 (25); Chris Morris 2/17 (4 overs)

Royal Challengers Bangalore won by 82 runs
Sharjah Cricket Stadium, Sharjah
Umpires: Richard Illingworth (Eng) and Krishnamachari Srinivasan (Ind)
Player of the match: AB de Villiers (Royal Challengers Bangalore)

- Royal Challengers Bangalore won the toss and elected to bat.

15 October 2020
19:30 (D/N)
Scorecard

Royal Challengers Bangalore; 171/6 (20 overs)	v	Kings XI Punjab; 177/2 (20 overs)
Virat Kohli 48 (39); Murugan Ashwin 2/23 (4 overs)		K. L. Rahul 61* (49); Yuzvendra Chahal 1/35 (3 overs)

Kings XI Punjab won by 8 wickets
Sharjah Cricket Stadium, Sharjah
Umpires: K. N. Ananthapadmanabhan (Ind) and Chettithody Shamshuddin (Ind)
Player of the match: K. L. Rahul (Kings XI Punjab)

- Royal Challengers Bangalore won the toss and elected to bat.

17 October 2020
15:30 (D/N)
Scorecard

Rajasthan Royals; 177/6 (20 overs)	v	Royal Challengers Bangalore; 179/3 (19.4 overs)
Steve Smith 57 (36); Chris Morris 4/26 (4 overs)		AB de Villiers 55* (22); Rahul Tewatia 1/30 (4 overs)

Royal Challengers Bangalore won by 7 wickets
Dubai International Cricket Stadium, Dubai
Umpires: Anil Chaudhary (Ind) and Nitin Menon (Ind)
Player of the match: AB de Villiers (Royal Challengers Bangalore)

- Rajasthan Royals won the toss and elected to bat.

21 October 2020
19:30 (D/N)
Scorecard

Kolkata Knight Riders; 84/8 (20 overs)	v	Royal Challengers Bangalore; 85/2 (13.3 overs)
Eoin Morgan 30 (34); Mohammed Siraj 3/8 (4 overs)		Devdutt Padikkal 25 (17); Lockie Ferguson 1/17 (4 overs)

Royal Challengers Bangalore won by 8 wickets
Sheikh Zayed Cricket Stadium, Abu Dhabi
Umpires: Sundaram Ravi (Ind) and Virender Sharma (Ind)
Player of the match: Mohammed Siraj (Royal Challengers Bangalore)

- Kolkata Knight Riders won the toss and elected to bat.
- Mohammed Siraj (Royal Challengers Bangalore) became the first bowler to bowl two maiden overs in an IPL match.

25 October 2020
15:30
Scorecard

Royal Challengers Bangalore; 145/6 (20 overs)	v	Chennai Super Kings; 150/2 (18.4 overs)
Virat Kohli 50 (43); Sam Curran 3/19 (3 overs)		Ruturaj Gaikwad 65* (51); Yuzvendra Chahal 1/21 (4 overs)

Chennai Super Kings won by 8 wickets
Dubai International Cricket Stadium, Dubai
Umpires: Richard Illingworth (Eng) and Chettithody Shamshuddin (Ind)
Player of the match: Ruturaj Gaikwad (Chennai Super Kings)

- Royal Challengers Bangalore won the toss and elected to bat.

28 October 2020
19:30 (D/N)
Scorecard

Royal Challengers Bangalore; 164/6 (20 overs)	v	Mumbai Indians; 166/5 (19.1 overs)
Devdutt Padikkal 74 (45); Jasprit Bumrah 3/14 (4 overs)		Suryakumar Yadav 79* (43); Mohammed Siraj 2/28 (3.1 overs)

Mumbai Indians won by 5 wickets
Sheikh Zayed Cricket Stadium, Abu Dhabi
Umpires: Chris Gaffaney (NZ) and Ulhas Gandhe (Ind)
Player of the match: Suryakumar Yadav (Mumbai Indians)

- Mumbai Indians won the toss and elected to field.

31 October 2020
19:30 (D/N)
Scorecard

Royal Challengers Bangalore; 120/7 (20 overs)	v	Sunrisers Hyderabad; 121/5 (14.1 overs)
Josh Philippe 32 (31); Sandeep Sharma 2/20 (4 overs)		Wriddhiman Saha 39 (32); Yuzvendra Chahal 2/19 (3.1 overs)

Sunrisers Hyderabad won by 5 wickets
Sharjah Cricket Stadium, Sharjah
Umpires: K. N. Ananthapadmanabhan (Ind) and Krishnamachari Srinivasan (Ind)
Player of the match: Sandeep Sharma (Sunrisers Hyderabad)

- Sunrisers Hyderabad won the toss and elected to field.

2 November 2020
19:30 (D/N)
Scorecard

Royal Challengers Bangalore; 152/7 (20 overs)	v	Delhi Capitals; 154/4 (19 overs)
Devdutt Padikkal 50 (41); Anrich Nortje 3/33 (4 overs)		Ajinkya Rahane 60 (46); Shahbaz Ahmed 2/26 (4 overs)

Delhi Capitals won by 6 wickets
Sheikh Zayed Cricket Stadium, Abu Dhabi
Umpires: Chris Gaffaney (NZ) and Sundaram Ravi (Ind)
Player of the match: Anrich Nortje (Delhi Capitals)

- Delhi Capitals won the toss and elected to field.
- Royal Challengers Bangalore qualified for the playoffs and Delhi Capitals advanced to Qualifier 1 as a result of this match.

=== Playoffs ===
Eliminator

6 November 2020
19:30 (D/N)
Scorecard

Royal Challengers Bangalore; 131/7 (20 overs)	v	Sunrisers Hyderabad; 132/4 (19.4 overs)
AB de Villiers 56 (43); Jason Holder 3/25 (4 overs)		Kane Williamson 50* (44); Mohammed Siraj 2/28 (4 overs)

Sunrisers Hyderabad won by 6 wickets
Sheikh Zayed Cricket Stadium, Abu Dhabi
Umpires: Sundaram Ravi (Ind) and Paul Reiffel (Aus)
Player of the match: Kane Williamson (Sunrisers Hyderabad)

- Sunrisers Hyderabad won the toss and elected to field.

== Statistics ==
=== Most runs ===
No.	Name	Match	Inns	NO	Runs	HS	Ave.	BF	SR	100s	50s	0	4s	6s
1	Devdutt Padikkal	15	15	0	473	74	31.53	379	124.80	0	5	0	51	8
2	Virat Kohli	15	15	4	466	90*	42.36	384	121.35	0	3	0	23	11
3	AB de Villiers	15	14	4	454	73*	45.40	286	158.74	0	5	1	33	23
4	Aaron Finch	12	12	0	268	52	22.33	241	111.20	0	1	0	28	8
5	Shivam Dube	11	9	2	129	27*	18.42	105	122.85	0	0	0	5	9

- Source: Cricinfo

=== Most wickets ===
No.	Name	Match	Inns	Overs	Maidens	Runs	Wickets	BBI	Ave.	Econ.	SR	4W	5W
1	Yuzvendra Chahal	15	15	57.1	0	405	21	3/18	19.28	7.08	16.3	0	0
2	Chris Morris	9	9	31.4	1	210	11	4/26	19.09	6.63	17.2	1	0
3	Mohammed Siraj	9	9	27.1	2	236	11	3/8	21.45	8.68	14.8	0	0
4	Isuru Udana	10	10	29.0	0	282	8	2/41	35.25	9.72	21.7	0	0
5	Washington Sundar	15	15	50.0	1	298	8	2/16	37.25	5.96	37.5	0	0

- Source: Cricinfo

== Player of the match awards ==
No.	Date	Player	Opponent	Result	Contribution	Ref.
1	21 September 2020	Yuzvendra Chahal	Sunrisers Hyderabad	Won by 10 runs	3/18 (4 overs)	
2	28 September 2020	AB de Villiers	Mumbai Indians	Won in super over	55 (24)	
3	3 October 2020	Yuzvendra Chahal	Rajasthan Royals	Won by 8 wickets	3/24 (4 overs)	
4	10 October 2020	Virat Kohli	Chennai Super Kings	Won by 37 runs	90* (52)	
5	12 October 2020	AB de Villiers	Kolkata Knight Riders	Won by 82 runs	73* (33)	
6	17 October 2020	AB de Villiers	Rajasthan Royals	Won by 7 wickets	55* (22)	
7	21 October 2020	Mohammed Siraj	Kolkata Knight Riders	Won by 8 wickets	3/8 (4 overs)	
