= 2020 Sunrisers Hyderabad season =

Indian Premier League cricket team season

Sunrisers Hyderabad
2020 season
- Coach: Trevor Bayliss
- Captain: David Warner
- Ground(s): Rajiv Gandhi International Cricket Stadium, Hyderabad
- IPL: Playoffs (3rd)
- Most runs: David Warner (548)
- Most wickets: Rashid Khan (20)
- Most catches: David Warner (12)
- Most wicket-keeping dismissals: Jonny Bairstow (8)

Sunrisers Hyderabad (often abbreviated as SRH) are a franchise cricket team based in Hyderabad, India, which plays in the Indian Premier League (IPL). They were one of the eight teams to compete in the 2020 Indian Premier League, which was their eighth outing in IPL tournaments. The team was captained by David Warner and coached by Trevor Bayliss with Brad Haddin as assistant coach, Muttiah Muralitharan as bowling coach and VVS Laxman as mentor.

They began their season by losing their opening fixture on 21 September, and went on to become the last team to qualify for the play-offs by defeating Mumbai Indians on 3 November. They beat the Royal Challengers Bangalore in the Eliminator but lost to the Delhi Capitals in the Qualifier 2 by 17 runs to finish the season in third place.

== Background ==
David Warner was reinstated as the captain of the Sunrisers replacing Kane Williamson on 27 February 2020.

The Board of Control for Cricket in India (BCCI) released the fixture details on 18 February 2020. The league stage was scheduled to start on 29 March 2020, with the opening match between Mumbai Indians and Chennai Super Kings, the two finalist of the previous season. On 13 March 2020, the BCCI postponed the tournament until 15 April, in view of the ongoing coronavirus pandemic. On 14 April 2020, the Prime Minister Narendra Modi said that the lockdown in India would last until at least 3 May 2020, with the tournament postponed further. The following day, the BCCI suspended the tournament indefinitely due to the pandemic.

On 17 May 2020, the Indian government relaxed nation-wide restrictions on sports events, allowing events to take place behind closed doors. On 24 May, Indian sports minister Kiren Rijiju stated that the decision on whether or not to allow the tournament to be conducted in 2020 will be made by the Indian government based on "the situation of the pandemic". On 2 August 2020, it was announced that the tournament would be played between 19 September and 10 November 2020 in the United Arab Emirates. On 10 August 2020, the Indian government gave its permission for the tournament to take place in the UAE. The schedule for the league stage of this season were released on 6 September with the Sunrisers Hyderabad playing their first match against the Royal Challengers Bangalore on 21 September in a home game at Dubai.

== Player acquisition ==
In October 2019, ICC banned Shakib Al Hasan for two years after breaching the ICC's Anti-Corruption Code and hence was subsequently released from the squad by the Sunrisers Hyderabad on 15 November 2019.

The Sunrisers Hyderabad retained 18 players and released five players as they announced their retention list on 15 November 2019 ahead of the auction. They entered into the auction with the remaining salary cap of ₹17 crore (US$2.0 million) to fill seven available slots, of which two are for the overseas players.

Retained players
Abhishek Sharma, Basil Thampi, Bhuvneshwar Kumar, Billy Stanlake, David Warner, Jonny Bairstow, Kane Williamson, Manish Pandey, Mohammad Nabi, Rashid Khan, Sandeep Sharma, Shahbaz Nadeem, Shreevats Goswami, Siddarth Kaul, Khaleel Ahmed, Thangarasu Natarajan, Vijay Shankar, Wriddhiman Saha

Released players
Deepak Hooda, Martin Guptill, Ricky Bhui, Shakib Al Hasan, (Note: In October 2019, ICC banned Shakib for two years after breaching the ICC's Anti-Corruption Code.) Yusuf Pathan

Added players
Virat Singh, Priyam Garg, Mitchell Marsh, Bavanaka Sandeep, Fabian Allen, Abdul Samad, Sanjay Yadav

Replacement players
Jason Holder, Prithvi Raj

== Squad ==
- Players with international caps are listed in **bold**.
- **Signed Year** denotes year from which player is continuously associated with Sunrisers Hyderabad

No.	Name	Nationality	Birth date	Batting style	Bowling style	Year signed	Salary	Notes
Batsmen
8	Virat Singh	India	8 December 1997 (aged 22)	Left-handed	Right-arm leg break	2020	₹1.9 crore (US$220,000)	
11	Priyam Garg	India	30 November 2000 (aged 19)	Right-handed	Right-arm medium-fast	2020	₹1.9 crore (US$220,000)	
21	**Manish Pandey**	India	10 September 1989 (aged 31)	Right-handed	Right-arm off break	2018	₹11 crore (US$1.3 million)	
22	**Kane Williamson**	New Zealand	8 August 1990 (aged 30)	Right-handed	Right-arm off break	2015	₹3 crore (US$350,000)	Overseas
31	**David Warner**	Australia	27 October 1986 (aged 33)	Left-handed	Right-arm leg break	2014	₹12 crore (US$1.4 million)	Captain; Overseas
All-rounders
1	Abdul Samad	India	28 October 2001 (aged 18)	Right-handed	Right-arm leg break	2020	₹20 lakh (US$24,000)	
4	Abhishek Sharma	India	4 September 2000 (aged 20)	Left-handed	Left-arm orthodox spin	2018	₹55 lakh (US$65,000)	
5	**Mitchell Marsh**	Australia	20 October 1991 (aged 28)	Right-handed	Right-arm medium-fast	2020	₹2 crore (US$240,000)	Overseas. Ruled out due to ankle injury.
7	**Mohammad Nabi**	Afghanistan	1 January 1985 (aged 35)	Right-handed	Right-arm off break	2017	₹1 crore (US$120,000)	Overseas
59	**Vijay Shankar**	India	26 January 1991 (aged 29)	Right-handed	Right-arm medium-fast	2018	₹3.2 crore (US$380,000)	
97	**Fabian Allen**	Jamaica	7 May 1995 (aged 25)	Right-handed	Left-arm orthodox spin	2020	₹50 lakh (US$59,000)	Overseas
98	**Jason Holder**	Barbados	5 November 1991 (aged 28)	Right-handed	Right-arm medium-fast	2020	₹75 lakh (US$89,000)	Overseas. Replacement for Marsh.
3	Bavanaka Sandeep	India	25 April 1992 (aged 28)	Left-handed	Left-arm orthodox spin	2020	₹20 lakh (US$24,000)	
24	Sanjay Yadav	India	10 May 1995 (aged 25)	Left-handed	Left-arm orthodox spin	2020	₹20 lakh (US$24,000)	
Wicket-keepers
36	Shreevats Goswami	India	18 May 1989 (aged 31)	Left-handed		2018	₹1 crore (US$120,000)	
6	**Wriddhiman Saha**	India	24 October 1984 (aged 35)	Right-handed		2018	₹1.2 crore (US$140,000)	Ruled out due to injury
51	**Jonny Bairstow**	England	26 September 1989 (aged 30)	Right-handed	Right-arm medium-fast	2019	₹2.2 crore (US$260,000)	Overseas
Bowlers
8	**Shahbaz Nadeem**	India	12 August 1989 (aged 31)	Right-handed	Left-arm orthodox spin	2018	₹3.2 crore (US$380,000)	
9	**Siddarth Kaul**	India	19 May 1990 (aged 30)	Right-handed	Right-arm medium-fast	2016	₹3.8 crore (US$450,000)	
15	**Bhuvneshwar Kumar**	India	5 February 1990 (aged 30)	Right-handed	Right-arm medium-fast	2014	₹8.5 crore (US$1.0 million)	Ruled out due to thigh injury.
19	**Rashid Khan**	Afghanistan	20 September 1998 (aged 21)	Right-handed	Right-arm leg break	2017	₹9 crore (US$1.1 million)	Overseas
27	**Khaleel Ahmed**	India	5 December 1997 (aged 22)	Right-handed	Left-arm medium-fast	2018	₹3 crore (US$350,000)	
30	Basil Thampi	India	11 September 1993 (aged 27)	Right-handed	Right-arm medium-fast	2018	₹95 lakh (US$110,000)	
37	**Billy Stanlake**	Australia	4 November 1994 (aged 25)	Left-handed	Right-arm medium-fast	2018	₹50 lakh (US$59,000)	Overseas
44	Thangarasu Natarajan	India	4 May 1991 (aged 29)	Left-handed	Left-arm medium-fast	2018	₹40 lakh (US$47,000)	
66	**Sandeep Sharma**	India	18 May 1993 (aged 27)	Right-handed	Right-arm medium-fast	2018	₹3 crore (US$350,000)	
25	Prithvi Raj	India	20 February 1998 (aged 22)	Left-handed	Left-arm medium-fast	2020	₹20 lakh (US$24,000)	Replacement for Kumar.

Last updated: 6 October 2020.
Source: ESPNcricinfo

== Administration and support staff ==
Position	Name
Owner	Kalanithi Maran (Sun Network)
CEO	K Shanmughan
Head coach	Trevor Bayliss
Assistant coach	Brad Haddin
Bowling coach	Muttiah Muralitharan
Fielding coach	Biju George
Mentor	V. V. S. Laxman
Physio	Theo Kapakoulakis
Physical trainer	Mario Villavarayan

== Kit manufacturers and sponsors ==
Kit Manufacturers	Shirt Sponsor (Chest)	Shirt Sponsor (Back)	Chest Branding
TYKA Sports	JK Lakshmi Cement	Ralco Tyres	Valvoline
Source :

T20 uniform

== Season overview ==
=== League stage ===
==== Standings ====
Pos	Team	Pld	W	L	NR	Pts	NRR	Qualification
1	Mumbai Indians (C)	14	9	5	0	18	1.107	Advance to Qualifier 1
2	Delhi Capitals (R)	14	8	6	0	16	−0.109	Advance to Qualifier 1
3	Sunrisers Hyderabad (3rd)	14	7	7	0	14	0.608	Advance to Eliminator
4	Royal Challengers Bangalore (4th)	14	7	7	0	14	−0.172	Advance to Eliminator
5	Kolkata Knight Riders	14	7	7	0	14	−0.214	
6	Kings XI Punjab	14	6	8	0	12	−0.162	
7	Chennai Super Kings	14	6	8	0	12	−0.455	
8	Rajasthan Royals	14	6	8	0	12	−0.569	

Source: IPLT20.com
The four top ranked teams qualify for the playoffs.

==== Results by match ====
Round	1	2	3	4	5	6	7	8	9	10	11	12	13	14
Ground	H	A	A	A	A	H	H	H	H	A	A	H	A	H
Result	L	L	W	W	L	W	L	L	L	W	L	W	W	W
Position	6	8	6	4	6	3	5	5	5	5	6	6	4	3

Source: Fixtures
A = Away; H = Home; W = Win; D = Draw; L = Loss

== Fixtures ==
The schedule for the league stage of this season were released on 6 September with the Sunrisers Hyderabad playing their first match against the Royal Challengers Bangalore on 21 September in a home game at Dubai.

=== League stage ===
21 September	Royal Challengers Bangalore; 163/5 (20 overs)	v	Sunrisers Hyderabad (H); 153/10 (19.4 overs)	Royal Challengers Bangalore won by 10 runs
19:30 (D/N) Match 1 Scorecard	Royal Challengers Bangalore; 163/5 (20 overs)	v	Sunrisers Hyderabad (H); 153/10 (19.4 overs)	Dubai International Cricket Stadium, Dubai; Umpires: Anil Dandekar (Ind) and Nitin Menon (Ind); Player of the match: Yuzvendra Chahal (Royal Challengers Bangalore)
19:30 (D/N) Match 1 Scorecard	Devdutt Padikkal 56 (42); Vijay Shankar 1/14 (1.2 overs)		Jonny Bairstow 61 (43); Yuzvendra Chahal 3/18 (4 overs)	Dubai International Cricket Stadium, Dubai; Umpires: Anil Dandekar (Ind) and Nitin Menon (Ind); Player of the match: Yuzvendra Chahal (Royal Challengers Bangalore)
Sunrisers Hyderabad won the toss and elected to field.				Dubai International Cricket Stadium, Dubai; Umpires: Anil Dandekar (Ind) and Nitin Menon (Ind); Player of the match: Yuzvendra Chahal (Royal Challengers Bangalore)

26 September	Sunrisers Hyderabad; 142/4 (20 overs)	v	Kolkata Knight Riders (H); 145/3 (18 overs)	Kolkata Knight Riders won by 7 wickets
19:30 (D/N) Match 2 Scorecard	Sunrisers Hyderabad; 142/4 (20 overs)	v	Kolkata Knight Riders (H); 145/3 (18 overs)	Sheikh Zayed Cricket Stadium, Abu Dhabi; Umpires: Chris Gaffaney (NZ) and Virender Sharma (Ind); Player of the match: Shubman Gill (Kolkata Knight Riders)
19:30 (D/N) Match 2 Scorecard	Manish Pandey 51 (38); Andre Russell 1/16 (2 overs)		Shubman Gill 70* (62); Rashid Khan 1/25 (4 overs)	Sheikh Zayed Cricket Stadium, Abu Dhabi; Umpires: Chris Gaffaney (NZ) and Virender Sharma (Ind); Player of the match: Shubman Gill (Kolkata Knight Riders)
Sunrisers Hyderabad won the toss and elected to bat.				Sheikh Zayed Cricket Stadium, Abu Dhabi; Umpires: Chris Gaffaney (NZ) and Virender Sharma (Ind); Player of the match: Shubman Gill (Kolkata Knight Riders)

29 September	Sunrisers Hyderabad; 162/4 (20 overs)	v	Delhi Capitals (H); 147/7 (20 overs)	Sunrisers Hyderabad won by 15 runs
19:30 (D/N) Match 3 Scorecard	Sunrisers Hyderabad; 162/4 (20 overs)	v	Delhi Capitals (H); 147/7 (20 overs)	Sheikh Zayed Cricket Stadium, Abu Dhabi; Umpires: Sundaram Ravi (Ind) and Virender Sharma (Ind); Player of the match: Rashid Khan (Sunrisers Hyderabad)
19:30 (D/N) Match 3 Scorecard	Jonny Bairstow 53 (48); Kagiso Rabada 2/21 (4 overs)		Shikhar Dhawan 34 (31); Rashid Khan 3/14 (4 overs)	Sheikh Zayed Cricket Stadium, Abu Dhabi; Umpires: Sundaram Ravi (Ind) and Virender Sharma (Ind); Player of the match: Rashid Khan (Sunrisers Hyderabad)
Delhi Capitals won the toss and elected to field.				Sheikh Zayed Cricket Stadium, Abu Dhabi; Umpires: Sundaram Ravi (Ind) and Virender Sharma (Ind); Player of the match: Rashid Khan (Sunrisers Hyderabad)

2 October	Sunrisers Hyderabad; 164/5 (20 overs)	v	Chennai Super Kings (H); 157/5 (20 overs)	Sunrisers Hyderabad won by 7 runs
19:30 (D/N) Match 4 Scorecard	Sunrisers Hyderabad; 164/5 (20 overs)	v	Chennai Super Kings (H); 157/5 (20 overs)	Dubai International Cricket Stadium, Dubai; Umpires: Anil Chaudhary (Ind) and Paul Reiffel (Aus); Player of the match: Priyam Garg (Sunrisers Hyderabad)
19:30 (D/N) Match 4 Scorecard	Priyam Garg 51* (26); Deepak Chahar 2/31 (4 overs)		Ravindra Jadeja 50 (35); Thangarasu Natarajan 2/43 (4 overs)	Dubai International Cricket Stadium, Dubai; Umpires: Anil Chaudhary (Ind) and Paul Reiffel (Aus); Player of the match: Priyam Garg (Sunrisers Hyderabad)
Sunrisers Hyderabad won the toss and elected to bat.				Dubai International Cricket Stadium, Dubai; Umpires: Anil Chaudhary (Ind) and Paul Reiffel (Aus); Player of the match: Priyam Garg (Sunrisers Hyderabad)

4 October	(H) Mumbai Indians; 208/5 (20 overs)	v	Sunrisers Hyderabad; 174/7 (20 overs)	Mumbai Indians won by 34 runs
15:30 Match 5 Scorecard	(H) Mumbai Indians; 208/5 (20 overs)	v	Sunrisers Hyderabad; 174/7 (20 overs)	Sharjah Cricket Stadium, Sharjah; Umpires: K.N. Ananthapadmanabhan (Ind) and Richard Illingworth (Eng); Player of the match: Trent Boult (Mumbai Indians)
15:30 Match 5 Scorecard	Quinton de Kock 67 (39); Sandeep Sharma 2/41 (4 overs)		David Warner 60 (44); Trent Boult 2/28 (4 overs)	Sharjah Cricket Stadium, Sharjah; Umpires: K.N. Ananthapadmanabhan (Ind) and Richard Illingworth (Eng); Player of the match: Trent Boult (Mumbai Indians)
Mumbai Indians won the toss and elected to bat.				Sharjah Cricket Stadium, Sharjah; Umpires: K.N. Ananthapadmanabhan (Ind) and Richard Illingworth (Eng); Player of the match: Trent Boult (Mumbai Indians)

8 October	(H) Sunrisers Hyderabad; 201/6 (20 overs)	v	Kings XI Punjab; 132 (16.5 overs)	Sunrisers Hyderabad won by 69 runs
19:30 (D/N) Match 6 Scorecard	(H) Sunrisers Hyderabad; 201/6 (20 overs)	v	Kings XI Punjab; 132 (16.5 overs)	Dubai International Cricket Stadium, Dubai; Umpires: Anil Chaudhary (Ind) and Nitin Menon (Ind); Player of the match: Jonny Bairstow (Sunrisers Hyderabad)
19:30 (D/N) Match 6 Scorecard	Jonny Bairstow 97 (55); Ravi Bishnoi 3/29 (3 overs)		Nicholas Pooran 77 (37); Rashid Khan 3/12 (4 overs)	Dubai International Cricket Stadium, Dubai; Umpires: Anil Chaudhary (Ind) and Nitin Menon (Ind); Player of the match: Jonny Bairstow (Sunrisers Hyderabad)
Sunrisers Hyderabad won the toss and elected to bat.				Dubai International Cricket Stadium, Dubai; Umpires: Anil Chaudhary (Ind) and Nitin Menon (Ind); Player of the match: Jonny Bairstow (Sunrisers Hyderabad)

11 October	(H) Sunrisers Hyderabad; 158/4 (20 overs)	v	Rajasthan Royals; 163/5 (19.5 overs)	Rajasthan Royals won by 5 wickets
15:30 Match 7 Scorecard	(H) Sunrisers Hyderabad; 158/4 (20 overs)	v	Rajasthan Royals; 163/5 (19.5 overs)	Dubai International Cricket Stadium, Dubai; Umpires: Yeshwant Barde (IND) and Paul Reiffel (AUS); Player of the match: Rahul Tewatia (Rajasthan Royals)
15:30 Match 7 Scorecard	Manish Pandey 54 (44); Jofra Archer 1/25 (4 overs)		Rahul Tewatia 48* (28); Rashid Khan 2/25 (4 overs)	Dubai International Cricket Stadium, Dubai; Umpires: Yeshwant Barde (IND) and Paul Reiffel (AUS); Player of the match: Rahul Tewatia (Rajasthan Royals)
Sunrisers Hyderabad won the toss and elected to bat.				Dubai International Cricket Stadium, Dubai; Umpires: Yeshwant Barde (IND) and Paul Reiffel (AUS); Player of the match: Rahul Tewatia (Rajasthan Royals)

13 October	Chennai Super Kings; 167/6 (20 overs)	v	Sunrisers Hyderabad (H); 147/8 (20 overs)	Chennai Super Kings won by 20 runs
19:30 (D/N) Match 8 Scorecard	Chennai Super Kings; 167/6 (20 overs)	v	Sunrisers Hyderabad (H); 147/8 (20 overs)	Dubai International Cricket Stadium, Dubai; Umpires: Anil Chaudhary (Ind) and Paul Reiffel (Aus); Player of the match: Ravindra Jadeja (Chennai Super Kings)
19:30 (D/N) Match 8 Scorecard	Shane Watson 42 (38); Sandeep Sharma 2/19 (4 overs)		Kane Williamson 57 (39); Dwayne Bravo 2/25 (3 overs)	Dubai International Cricket Stadium, Dubai; Umpires: Anil Chaudhary (Ind) and Paul Reiffel (Aus); Player of the match: Ravindra Jadeja (Chennai Super Kings)
Chennai Super Kings won the toss and elected to bat.				Dubai International Cricket Stadium, Dubai; Umpires: Anil Chaudhary (Ind) and Paul Reiffel (Aus); Player of the match: Ravindra Jadeja (Chennai Super Kings)

18 October	Kolkata Knight Riders; 163/5 (20 overs)	v	Sunrisers Hyderabad (H); 163/6 (20 overs)	Match tied. Kolkata Knight Riders won the Super Over
15:30 Match 9 Scorecard	Kolkata Knight Riders; 163/5 (20 overs)	v	Sunrisers Hyderabad (H); 163/6 (20 overs)	Sheikh Zayed Stadium, Abu Dhabi; Umpires: Pashchim Pathak (Ind) and Sundaram Ravi (Ind); Player of the match: Lockie Ferguson (Kolkata Knight Riders)
15:30 Match 9 Scorecard	Shubman Gill 36 (37); Thangarasu Natarajan 2/40 (4 overs)		David Warner 47* (33); Lockie Ferguson 3/15 (4 overs)	Sheikh Zayed Stadium, Abu Dhabi; Umpires: Pashchim Pathak (Ind) and Sundaram Ravi (Ind); Player of the match: Lockie Ferguson (Kolkata Knight Riders)
Sunrisers Hyderabad won the toss and elected to field.; Super Over: Sunrisers Hyderabad 2/2 (0.3 overs), Kolkata Knight Riders 3/0 (0.3 overs)				Sheikh Zayed Stadium, Abu Dhabi; Umpires: Pashchim Pathak (Ind) and Sundaram Ravi (Ind); Player of the match: Lockie Ferguson (Kolkata Knight Riders)

22 October	(H) Rajasthan Royals; 154/6 (20 overs)	v	Sunrisers Hyderabad; 156/2 (18.2 overs)	Sunrisers Hyderabad won by 8 wickets.
19:30 (D/N) Match 10 Scorecard	(H) Rajasthan Royals; 154/6 (20 overs)	v	Sunrisers Hyderabad; 156/2 (18.2 overs)	Dubai International Cricket Stadium, Dubai; Umpires: Nitin Menon (Ind) and Paul Reiffel (Aus); Player of the match: Manish Pandey (Sunrisers Hyderabad)
19:30 (D/N) Match 10 Scorecard	Sanju Samson 36 (26); Jason Holder 3/33 (4 overs)		Manish Pandey 83* (47); Jofra Archer 2/21 (4 overs)	Dubai International Cricket Stadium, Dubai; Umpires: Nitin Menon (Ind) and Paul Reiffel (Aus); Player of the match: Manish Pandey (Sunrisers Hyderabad)
Sunrisers Hyderabad won the toss and elected to field.				Dubai International Cricket Stadium, Dubai; Umpires: Nitin Menon (Ind) and Paul Reiffel (Aus); Player of the match: Manish Pandey (Sunrisers Hyderabad)

24 October	(H) Kings XI Punjab; 126/7 (20 overs)	v	Sunrisers Hyderabad; 114 (19.5 overs)	Kings XI Punjab won by 12 runs
19:30 (D/N) Match 11 Scorecard	(H) Kings XI Punjab; 126/7 (20 overs)	v	Sunrisers Hyderabad; 114 (19.5 overs)	Dubai International Cricket Stadium, Dubai; Umpires: Anil Dandekar (Ind) and Paul Reiffel (Aus); Player of the match: Chris Jordan (Kings XI Punjab)
19:30 (D/N) Match 11 Scorecard	Nicholas Pooran 32* (28); Rashid Khan 2/14 (4 overs)		David Warner 35 (20); Chris Jordan 3/17 (4 overs)	Dubai International Cricket Stadium, Dubai; Umpires: Anil Dandekar (Ind) and Paul Reiffel (Aus); Player of the match: Chris Jordan (Kings XI Punjab)
Sunrisers Hyderabad won the toss and chose to field.				Dubai International Cricket Stadium, Dubai; Umpires: Anil Dandekar (Ind) and Paul Reiffel (Aus); Player of the match: Chris Jordan (Kings XI Punjab)

27 October	(H) Sunrisers Hyderabad; 219/2 (20 overs)	v	Delhi Capitals; 131 (19 overs)	Sunrisers Hyderabad won by 88 runs
19:30 (D/N) Match 12 Scorecard	(H) Sunrisers Hyderabad; 219/2 (20 overs)	v	Delhi Capitals; 131 (19 overs)	Dubai International Cricket Stadium, Dubai; Umpires: Nitin Menon (Ind) and Anil Chaudhary (Ind); Player of the match: Wriddhiman Saha (Sunrisers Hyderabad)
19:30 (D/N) Match 12 Scorecard	Wriddhiman Saha 87 (45); Ravichandran Ashwin 1/35 (3 overs)		Rishabh Pant 36 (35); Rashid Khan 3/7 (4 overs)	Dubai International Cricket Stadium, Dubai; Umpires: Nitin Menon (Ind) and Anil Chaudhary (Ind); Player of the match: Wriddhiman Saha (Sunrisers Hyderabad)
Delhi Capitals won the toss and elected to field.				Dubai International Cricket Stadium, Dubai; Umpires: Nitin Menon (Ind) and Anil Chaudhary (Ind); Player of the match: Wriddhiman Saha (Sunrisers Hyderabad)

31 October	(H) Royal Challengers Bangalore; 120/7(20 over)	v	Sunrisers Hyderabad; 121/5(14.1 over)	Sunrisers Hyderabad won by 5 wickets
19:30 (D/N) Match 13 Scorecard	(H) Royal Challengers Bangalore; 120/7(20 over)	v	Sunrisers Hyderabad; 121/5(14.1 over)	Sharjah Cricket Stadium, Sharjah; Umpires: K. N. Ananthapadmanabhan (Ind), Krishnamachari Srinivasan (Ind), Player of the match: Sandeep Sharma (Sunrisers Hyderabad)
19:30 (D/N) Match 13 Scorecard	Josh Philippe 32 (31); Sandeep Sharma 2/20 (4 overs)		Wriddhiman Saha 39 (32); Yuzvendra Chahal 2/19(3.1 over)	Sharjah Cricket Stadium, Sharjah; Umpires: K. N. Ananthapadmanabhan (Ind), Krishnamachari Srinivasan (Ind), Player of the match: Sandeep Sharma (Sunrisers Hyderabad)
Sunrisers Hyderabad won the toss and elected to field				Sharjah Cricket Stadium, Sharjah; Umpires: K. N. Ananthapadmanabhan (Ind), Krishnamachari Srinivasan (Ind), Player of the match: Sandeep Sharma (Sunrisers Hyderabad)

3 November	Mumbai Indians; 149/8 (20 overs)	v	Sunrisers Hyderabad (H); 151/0 (17.1 Overs)	Sunrisers Hyderabad won by 10 wickets
19:30 (D/N) Match 14 Scorecard	Mumbai Indians; 149/8 (20 overs)	v	Sunrisers Hyderabad (H); 151/0 (17.1 Overs)	Sharjah Cricket Stadium, Sharjah; Umpires: Richard Illingworth (Eng) and Chettithody Shamshuddin (Ind); Player of the match: Shahbaz Nadeem (Sunrisers Hyderabad)
19:30 (D/N) Match 14 Scorecard	Kieron Pollard 41 (25); Sandeep Sharma 3/34 (4 Overs)		David Warner 85*(58); Dhawal Kulkarni 0/22 (4 Overs)	Sharjah Cricket Stadium, Sharjah; Umpires: Richard Illingworth (Eng) and Chettithody Shamshuddin (Ind); Player of the match: Shahbaz Nadeem (Sunrisers Hyderabad)
Sunrisers Hyderabad won the toss and elected to field.; Sunrisers Hyderabad qualified for the playoffs for the fifth consecutive time.				Sharjah Cricket Stadium, Sharjah; Umpires: Richard Illingworth (Eng) and Chettithody Shamshuddin (Ind); Player of the match: Shahbaz Nadeem (Sunrisers Hyderabad)

=== Playoff stage ===
==== Eliminator ====
6 November	Royal Challengers Bangalore; 131/7 (20 Overs)	v	Sunrisers Hyderabad; 132/4 (19.4 overs)	Sunrisers Hyderabad won by 6 wickets
19:30 (D/N) Eliminator Scorecard	Royal Challengers Bangalore; 131/7 (20 Overs)	v	Sunrisers Hyderabad; 132/4 (19.4 overs)	Sheikh Zayed Cricket Stadium, Abu Dhabi; Umpires: Sundaram Ravi (Ind) and Paul Reiffel (Aus); Player of the match: Kane Williamson (Sunrisers Hyderabad)
19:30 (D/N) Eliminator Scorecard	AB de Villiers 56(43); Jason Holder 3/25 (4 Overs)		Kane Williamson 50(44); Mohammed Siraj 2/28 (4 Overs)	Sheikh Zayed Cricket Stadium, Abu Dhabi; Umpires: Sundaram Ravi (Ind) and Paul Reiffel (Aus); Player of the match: Kane Williamson (Sunrisers Hyderabad)
Sunrisers Hyderabad won the toss and elected to field.				Sheikh Zayed Cricket Stadium, Abu Dhabi; Umpires: Sundaram Ravi (Ind) and Paul Reiffel (Aus); Player of the match: Kane Williamson (Sunrisers Hyderabad)

==== Qualifier 2 ====
8 November	Delhi Capitals; 189/3 (20 overs)	v	Sunrisers Hyderabad; 172/8 (20 overs)	Delhi Capitals won by 17 runs
19:30 (D/N) Qualifier 2 Scorecard	Delhi Capitals; 189/3 (20 overs)	v	Sunrisers Hyderabad; 172/8 (20 overs)	Sheikh Zayed Cricket Stadium, Abu Dhabi; Umpires: Sundaram Ravi (Ind) and Paul Reiffel (Aus); Player of the match: Marcus Stoinis (Delhi Capitals)
19:30 (D/N) Qualifier 2 Scorecard	Shikhar Dhawan 78 (50); Rashid Khan 1/26 (4 overs)		Kane Williamson 67 (45); Kagiso Rabada 4/29 (4 overs)	Sheikh Zayed Cricket Stadium, Abu Dhabi; Umpires: Sundaram Ravi (Ind) and Paul Reiffel (Aus); Player of the match: Marcus Stoinis (Delhi Capitals)
Delhi Capitals won the toss and elected to bat.				Sheikh Zayed Cricket Stadium, Abu Dhabi; Umpires: Sundaram Ravi (Ind) and Paul Reiffel (Aus); Player of the match: Marcus Stoinis (Delhi Capitals)

== Statistics ==
No.	Name	Mat	Runs	HS	Ave	SR	Wkts	BBI	Ave	Eco	Ct	St
1	Abdul Samad	12	111	33	22.20	170.76	1	1/41	96.00	13.71	5	–
3	Shreevats Goswami	2	0	0	0.00	0.00	–	–	–	–	1	0
4	Abhishek Sharma	8	71	31	14.20	126.78	2	1/15	45.50	9.10	1	–
5	Mitchell Marsh	1	0	0	0.00	0.00	0	–	–	9.00	0	–
6	Wriddhiman Saha	4	214	87	71.33	139.86	–	–	–	–	2	1
7	Mohammad Nabi	1	11	11*	–	137.50	0	–	–	5.75	0	–
8	Shahbaz Nadeem	7	7	5	7.00	87.50	5	2/19	35.60	8.09	1	–
9	Siddarth Kaul	1	–	–	–	–	2	2/64	32.00	16.00	0	–
11	Priyam Garg	14	133	51*	14.77	119.81	–	–	–	–	6	–
15	Bhuvneshwar Kumar	4	0	0	0.00	0.00	3	2/25	33.00	6.98	0	–
19	Rashid Khan	16	35	14	8.75	116.66	20	3/7	17.20	5.37	3	–
21	Manish Pandey	16	425	83*	32.69	127.62	–	–	–	–	7	–
22	Kane Williamson	12	317	67	45.28	133.75	0	–	–	12.00	6	–
27	Khaleel Ahmed	7	0	0	0.00	0.00	8	2/24	30.25	9.42	1	–
30	Basil Thampi	1	–	–	–	–	1	1/46	46.00	11.50	0	–
31	David Warner	16	548	85*	39.14	134.64	0	–	–	12.00	12	–
44	Thangarasu Natarajan	16	3	3*	–	60.00	16	2/24	31.50	8.02	3	–
51	Jonny Bairstow	11	345	97	31.36	126.83	–	–	–	–	7	1
59	Vijay Shankar	7	97	52*	24.25	101.04	4	1/11	20.50	6.22	1	–
66	Sandeep Sharma	13	12	9	6.00	80.00	14	3/34	26.71	7.19	0	–
98	Jason Holder	7	66	26*	33.00	124.52	14	3/25	16.64	8.32	0	–

IPL Statistics Full Table on ESPNcricinfo

== Awards and achievements ==
=== Awards ===
Man of the Match

No.	Date	Player	Opponent	Venue	Result	Contribution	Ref.
1	29 September 2020	Rashid Khan	Delhi Capitals	Abu Dhabi	Won by 15 runs	3/14 (4 overs)	
2	2 October 2020	Priyam Garg	Chennai Super Kings	Dubai	Won by 7 runs	51* (26)	
3	8 October 2020	Jonny Bairstow	Kings XI Punjab	Dubai	Won by 69 runs	97 (55)	
4	22 October 2020	Manish Pandey	Rajasthan Royals	Dubai	Won by 8 wickets	83* (47)	
5	27 October 2020	Wriddhiman Saha	Delhi Capitals	Dubai	Won by 88 runs	87 (45)	
6	31 October 2020	Sandeep Sharma	Royal Challengers Bangalore	Sharjah	Won by 5 wickets	2/20 (4 overs)	
7	3 November 2020	Shahbaz Nadeem	Mumbai Indians	Sharjah	Won by 10 wickets	2/19 (4 overs)	
8	6 November 2020	Kane Williamson	Royal Challengers Bangalore	Abu Dhabi	Won by 6 wickets	50* (44)	

=== Achievements ===
- Most dot balls bowled in an innings in the 2020 IPL : Rashid Khan (17)
- Best bowling economy in the 2020 IPL : Rashid Khan (5.37)
- Best bowling economy in an innings in the 2020 IPL : Rashid Khan (1.75)

== Reaction ==
The Sunrisers captain David Warner said he was proud on the team making it to playoffs despite missing key players to injuries and also heaped praise on left-arm quick T. Natarajan who bowled more yorkers than anyone in this tournament. He said, “Natarajan has been waiting in the wings. So to get a chance, to have an IPL the way he has is outstanding.”

Rashid Khan was featured in both Cricbuzz and Sky Sports team of the tournament.

The ongoing pandemic impacted the brand value of IPL which saw a drop of 22% to an estimated value of US$4.4billion post 2020 season. The Sunrisers also saw the decrease in their brand value by 4% to US$57.4million in 2020, according to Brand Finance.
