= 2020 Rajasthan Royals season =

Indian Premier League cricket team season

Rajasthan Royals
2020 season
- Coach: Andrew McDonald
- Captain: Steve Smith
- Ground(s): Sawai Mansingh Stadium, Jaipur
- Most runs: Sanju Samson (375 Runs)
- Most wickets: Jofra Archer (20 Wickets)

The 2020 season was the 13th season for the Indian Premier League franchise Rajasthan Royals. The Rajasthan Royals are sometimes considered as the "moneyball" team of the IPL. The Royals are known to unearth obscure, high potential talent team. Steve Smith led the team. The team finished at bottom of the table with 6 wins and 8 losses. Sanju Samson scored the most runs with 375 runs and Jofra Archer took the most wickets with 2020 and earned the Player Of The Tournament.

== Background ==
=== Player retention and transfers ===
The Rajasthan Royals retained 11 players and released 11.

Retained
Steve Smith, Sanju Samson, Jofra Archer, Ben Stokes, Jos Buttler, Riyan Parag, Shashank Singh, Shreyas Gopal, Mahipal Lomror, Varun Aaron, Manan Vohra.

Released
Ashton Turner, Oshane Thomas, Shubham Ranjane, Prashant Chopra, Ish Sodhi, Aryaman Birla, Jaydev Unadkat, Rahul Tripathi, Stuart Binny, Liam Livingstone, Sudheshan Midhun, Ajinkya Rahane.

=== Auction ===
The franchise purchased the most number of the players at the IPL 2020 Auction, signing a further 11.

Auction
Robin Uthappa, Jaydev Unadkat, Yashasvi Jaiswal, Anuj Rawat, Akash Singh, Kartik Tyagi, David Miller, Oshane Thomas, Anirudha Joshi, Andrew Tye, Tom Curran

== Indian Premier League ==
=== Offseason ===
On 13 March 2020, the BCCI postponed the tournament until 15 April, in view of the ongoing coronavirus pandemic. On 14 April 2020, Narendra Modi said that the lockdown in India would last until at least 3 May 2020, with the tournament postponed further. The following day, the BCCI suspended the tournament indefinitely due to the pandemic.

On 17 May 2020, the Indian government relaxed nation-wide restrictions on sports events, allowing events to take place behind closed doors. On 24 May, Indian sports minister Kiren Rijiju stated that the decision on whether or not to allow the tournament to be conducted in 2020 will be made by the Indian government based on "the situation of the pandemic". In June 2020, the BCCI confirmed that their preference was to host the tournament in India, possibly between September and October. On 24 July 2020, it was confirmed that the tournament would start from 19 September 2020.

=== Group stage ===
On 22 September, the Rajasthan Royals started their season campaign defeating Chennai Super Kings by 16 runs. Steven Smith lost the toss and was put to bat. Rajasthan cruised past 100, and Sanju Samson posted a 74 off 32 balls before getting out, and Smith also got 69 off 47 balls as Royals posted a daunting 216 at the end of their 20 overs. Jofra Archer 27 in 8 balls and finished strongly for the royals, scoring 30 runs in the last over. Super Kings started off rapidly in their chase, getting 56 runs in the first six overs without losing a wicket. Once again Faf du Plessis got a half-century, and at the end they got to 200/6. On 27 September, Rajasthan Royals recorded their second win by chasing 223, this time it was Sanju Samson again who scored 85 runs, who played an instrumental role in Royals winning the match. On 30 September 2020 Rajasthan recorded their first loss against Kolkata Knight Riders. Kolkata batted first and put up a score of 174/6, Rajasthan failed to chase down 174 and lost the match by 37 runs. The team went on to lose 3 games. The Royals snapped their 3 match losing streak by beating Sunrisers Hyderabad. SRH batted first and posted a decent score of 158/4, Rajasthan lost the big wickets, but it was the unbeaten 69 run partnership of Rahul Tewatia and Riyan Parag which helped Royals to win the match by 5 wickets. The Royals continued to lose against Delhi and Bangalore. But they won against Chennai Super Kings by 7 wickets and then witnessed a loss against Sunrisers. But Royals were back in the game against Mumbai.Mumbai posted a good score of 195/4, but it was Ben Stokes and Sanju Samson whose 152 run partnership lead Royals to a 8-wicket win. They won against Kings XI Punjab, Ben Stokes being the Man of the Match again. They lost in the last group game against Kolkata Knight Riders by 60 runs. Therefore, Rajasthan were knocked out of the tournament finishing on 8th position.

== Squad ==
- Players with international caps are listed in **bold**.

No.	Name	Nationality	Birth date	Batting style	Bowling style	Year signed	Salary	Notes
Batsmen
49	Steve Smith	Australia	2 June 1989 (aged 31)	Right-handed	Right-arm leg break	2019	₹12.5 crore (US$1.3 million)	Overseas, Captain
6	Mahipal Lomror	India	16 November 1999 (aged 20)	Left-handed	Slow left-arm orthodox	2018	₹20 lakh (US$21,000)	
18	Manan Vohra	India	18 July 1993 (aged 27)	Right-handed	Right-arm medium	2019	₹20 lakh (US$21,000)	
267	Yashasvi Jaiswal	India	28 December 2001 (aged 18)	Left-handed	Left-arm leg break	2020	₹2.4 crore (US$250,000)	
10	**David Miller**	South Africa	10 June 1989 (aged 31)	Right-handed	Right-arm off break	2020	₹75 lakh (US$79,000)	Overseas
07	**Robin Uthappa**	India	11 November 1985 (aged 34)	Right-handed	Right-arm medium	2020	₹3 crore (US$310,000)	
—N/a	Aniruddha Joshi	India	7 November 1987 (aged 32)	Right-handed	Right-arm off break	2020	₹20 lakh (US$21,000)	
All-rounders
55	**Ben Stokes**	England	4 June 1991 (aged 29)	Left-handed	Right-arm fast-medium	2018	₹12.5 crore (US$1.3 million)	Overseas
4	Rahul Tewatia	India	20 May 1993 (aged 27)	Left-handed	Right-arm leg break	2020	₹3 crore (US$310,000)	
5	Riyan Parag	India	10 November 2001 (aged 18)	Right-handed	Right-arm off break	2019	₹20 lakh (US$21,000)	
43	Shashank Singh	India	21 September 1991 (aged 28)	Right-handed	Right-arm off break	2019	₹20 lakh (US$21,000)	
Wicket-keepers
11	**Sanju Samson**	India	11 November 1994 (aged 25)	Right-handed	Right-arm medium	2018	₹8 crore (US$837,752.80)	
63	**Jos Buttler**	England	8 September 1990 (aged 30)	Right-handed	–	2018	₹4.4 crore (US$461,000)	Overseas; Vice Captain
—N/a	Anuj Rawat	India	17 October 1999 (aged 20)	Left-handed	–	2020	₹80 lakh (US$84,000)	
Spin Bowlers
37	Shreyas Gopal	India	4 September 1993 (aged 27)	Right-handed	Right-arm leg break	2018	₹20 lakh (US$21,000)	
39	**Mayank Markande**	India	11 November 1997 (aged 22)	Right-handed	Right-arm leg break	2020	₹20 lakh (US$21,000)	
Pace Bowlers
22	**Jofra Archer**	England	1 April 1995 (aged 25)	Right-handed	Right-arm fast	2018	₹7.2 crore (US$753,977.50)	Overseas
77	**Varun Aaron**	India	29 October 1989 (aged 30)	Right-handed	Right-arm fast	2019	₹2.4 crore (US$251,000)	
3	Ankit Rajpoot	India	4 December 1993 (aged 26)	Right-handed	Right-arm fast-medium	2020	₹3 crore (US$310,000)	
99	**Jaydev Unadkat**	India	18 October 1991 (aged 28)	Right-handed	Left-arm fast	2020	₹3 crore (US$314,157.30)	
9	Kartik Tyagi	India	4 November 2001 (aged 18)	Right-handed	Right-arm medium-fast	2020	₹1.3 crore (US$136,134.80)	
68	**Andrew Tye**	Australia	12 December 1986 (aged 33)	Right-handed	Right-arm fast-medium	2020	₹1 crore (US$105,000)	Overseas
59	**Tom Curran**	England	12 March 1995 (aged 25)	Right-handed	Right-arm fast-medium	2020	₹1 crore (US$105,000)	Overseas
—N/a	**Oshane Thomas**	Jamaica	18 February 1997 (aged 23)	Left-handed	Right-arm fast	2020	₹50 lakh (US$52,359.60)	Overseas
—N/a	Akash Singh	India	26 April 2002 (aged 18)	Left-handed	Left-arm medium-fast	2020	₹20 lakh (US$21,000)	

== Administration and support staff ==
Position	Name
Owner	Amisha Hathiramani (Tresco International Ltd), Manoj Badale (Emerging Media (IPL) Ltd), Lachlan Murdoch (Blue Water Estate Ltd)
COO	Jake Lush McCrum
Brand ambassador and mentor	Shane Warne
Director of cricket	Zubin Bharucha
Head coach	Andrew McDonald
Batting coach	Amol Muzumdar
Spin bowling coach	Sairaj Bahutule

== Kit manufacturers and sponsors ==
Kit manufacturer	Shirt sponsor (chest)	Shirt sponsor (back)	Chest Branding
Alcis Sports	TV9 Bharatvarsh	Red Bull	KEI Wires & Cables
Source :

T20 uniform

== Teams and standings ==
=== Results by match ===
Round	1	2	3	4	5	6	7	8	9	10	11	12	13	14
Result	W	W	L	L	L	L	W	L	L	W	L	W	W	L
Position	1	2	3	6	7	7	6	7	7	5	7	6	5	8

Source: Fixtures
W = Win; D = Draw; L = Loss

=== League table ===
Pos	Team	Pld	W	L	NR	Pts	NRR	Qualification
1	Mumbai Indians (C)	14	9	5	0	18	1.107	Advance to Qualifier 1
2	Delhi Capitals (R)	14	8	6	0	16	−0.109	Advance to Qualifier 1
3	Sunrisers Hyderabad (3rd)	14	7	7	0	14	0.608	Advance to Eliminator
4	Royal Challengers Bangalore (4th)	14	7	7	0	14	−0.172	Advance to Eliminator
5	Kolkata Knight Riders	14	7	7	0	14	−0.214	
6	Kings XI Punjab	14	6	8	0	12	−0.162	
7	Chennai Super Kings	14	6	8	0	12	−0.455	
8	Rajasthan Royals	14	6	8	0	12	−0.569	

Source: IPLT20.com
The four top ranked teams qualify for the playoffs.

== League stage ==
22 September 2020
19:30 (D/N)
Scorecard

Rajasthan Royals; 216/7 (20 overs)	v	Chennai Super Kings; 200/6 (20 overs)
Sanju Samson 74 (32); Sam Curran 3/33 (4 overs)		Faf du Plessis 72 (37); Rahul Tewatia 3/37 (4 overs)

Rajasthan Royals won by 16 runs
Sharjah Cricket Stadium, Sharjah
Umpires: Vineet Kulkarni (Ind) and Chettithody Shamshuddin (Ind)
Player of the match: Sanju Samson (Rajasthan Royals)

- Chennai Super Kings won the toss and elected to field.
- Yashasvi Jaiswal (Rajasthan Royals) made his T20 debut.

27 September 2020
19:30 (D/N)
Scorecard

Kings XI Punjab; 223/2 (20 overs)	v	Rajasthan Royals; 226/6 (19.3 overs)
Mayank Agarwal 106 (50); Ankit Rajpoot 1/39 (4 overs)		Sanju Samson 85 (42); Mohammed Shami 3/53 (4 overs)

Rajasthan Royals won by 4 wickets
Sharjah Cricket Stadium, Sharjah
Umpires: Richard Illingworth (Eng) and Krishnamachari Srinivasan (Ind)
Player of the match: Sanju Samson (Rajasthan Royals)

- Rajasthan Royals won the toss and elected to field.
- Rajasthan Royals made the highest successful run-chase in Indian Premier League history.

30 September 2020
19:30 (D/N)
Scorecard

Kolkata Knight Riders; 174/6 (20 overs)	v	Rajasthan Royals; 137/9 (20 overs)
Shubman Gill 47 (34); Jofra Archer 2/18 (4 overs)		Tom Curran 54* (36); Kamlesh Nagarkoti 2/13 (2 overs)

Kolkata Knight Riders won by 37 runs
Dubai International Cricket Stadium, Dubai
Umpires: K. N. Ananthapadmanabhan (Ind) and Chettithody Shamshuddin (Ind)
Player of the match: Shivam Mavi (Kolkata Knight Riders)

- Rajasthan Royals won the toss and elected to field.

3 October 2020
15:30
Scorecard

Rajasthan Royals; 154/6 (20 overs)	v	Royal Challengers Bangalore; 158/2 (19.1 overs)
Mahipal Lomror 47 (39); Yuzvendra Chahal 3/24 (4 overs)		Virat Kohli 72* (53); Jofra Archer 1/18 (4 overs)

Royal Challengers Bangalore won by 8 wickets
Sheikh Zayed Cricket Stadium, Abu Dhabi
Umpires: Chris Gaffaney (NZ) and Sundaram Ravi (Ind)
Player of the match: Yuzvendra Chahal (Royal Challengers Bangalore)

- Rajasthan Royals won the toss and elected to bat.

6 October 2020
19:30 (D/N)
Scorecard

Mumbai Indians; 193/4 (20 overs)	v	Rajasthan Royals; 136 (18.1 overs)
Suryakumar Yadav 79* (47); Shreyas Gopal 2/28 (4 overs)		Jos Buttler 70 (44); Jasprit Bumrah 4/20 (4 overs)

Mumbai Indians won by 57 runs
Sheikh Zayed Cricket Stadium, Abu Dhabi
Umpires: Sundaram Ravi (Ind) and Virender Sharma (Ind)
Player of the match: Suryakumar Yadav (Mumbai Indians)

- Mumbai Indians won the toss and elected to bat.
- Kartik Tyagi (Rajasthan Royals) made his T20 debut.

9 October 2020
19:30 (D/N)
Scorecard

Delhi Capitals; 184/8 (20 overs)	v	Rajasthan Royals; 138 (19.4 overs)
Shimron Hetmyer 45 (24); Jofra Archer 3/24 (4 overs)		Rahul Tewatia 38 (29); Kagiso Rabada 3/35 (3.4 overs)

Delhi Capitals won by 46 runs
Sharjah Cricket Stadium, Sharjah
Umpires: K. N. Ananthapadmanabhan (Ind) and Chettithody Shamshuddin (Ind)
Player of the match: Ravichandran Ashwin (Delhi Capitals)

- Rajasthan Royals won the toss and elected to field.

11 October 2020
15:30
Scorecard

Sunrisers Hyderabad; 158/4 (20 overs)	v	Rajasthan Royals; 163/5 (19.5 overs)
Manish Pandey 54 (44); Jofra Archer 1/25 (4 overs)		Rahul Tewatia 45* (28); Rashid Khan 2/25 (4 overs)

Rajasthan Royals won by 5 wickets
Dubai International Cricket Stadium, Dubai
Umpires: Yeshwant Barde (Ind) and Paul Reiffel (Aus)
Player of the match: Rahul Tewatia (Rajasthan Royals)

- Sunrisers Hyderabad won the toss and elected to bat.

14 October 2020
19:30 (D/N)
Scorecard

Delhi Capitals; 161/7 (20 overs)	v	Rajasthan Royals; 148/8 (20 overs)
Shikhar Dhawan 57 (33); Jofra Archer 3/19 (4 overs)		Ben Stokes 41 (35); Anrich Nortje 2/33 (4 overs)

Delhi Capitals won by 13 runs
Dubai International Cricket Stadium, Dubai
Umpires: Anil Chaudhary (Ind) and Nitin Menon (Ind)
Player of the match: Anrich Nortje (Delhi Capitals)

- Delhi Capitals won the toss and elected to bat.

17 October 2020
15:30 (D/N)
Scorecard

Rajasthan Royals; 177/6 (20 overs)	v	Royal Challengers Bangalore; 179/3 (19.4 overs)
Steve Smith 57 (36); Chris Morris 4/26 (4 overs)		AB de Villiers 55* (22); Rahul Tewatia 1/30 (4 overs)

Royal Challengers Bangalore won by 7 wickets
Dubai International Cricket Stadium, Dubai
Umpires: Anil Chaudhary (Ind) and Nitin Menon (Ind)
Player of the match: AB de Villiers (Royal Challengers Bangalore)

- Rajasthan Royals won the toss and elected to bat.

19 October 2020
19:30 (D/N)
Scorecard

Chennai Super Kings; 125/5 (20 overs)	v	Rajasthan Royals; 126/3 (17.3 overs)
Ravindra Jadeja 35* (30); Shreyas Gopal 1/14 (4 overs)		Jos Buttler 70* (48); Deepak Chahar 2/18 (4 overs)

Rajasthan Royals won by 7 wickets
Sheikh Zayed Cricket Stadium, Abu Dhabi
Umpires: Chris Gaffaney (NZ) and Virender Sharma (Ind)
Player of the match: Jos Buttler (Rajasthan Royals)

- Chennai Super Kings won the toss and elected to bat.
- MS Dhoni (Chennai Super Kings) became the first player to appear in 200 IPL matches.

22 October 2020
19:30 (D/N)
Scorecard

Rajasthan Royals; 154/6 (20 overs)	v	Sunrisers Hyderabad; 156/2 (18.1 overs)
Sanju Samson 36 (26); Jason Holder 3/33 (4 overs)		Manish Pandey 83* (47); Jofra Archer 2/21 (4 overs)

Sunrisers Hyderabad won by 8 wickets
Dubai International Cricket Stadium, Dubai
Umpires: Nitin Menon (Ind) and Paul Reiffel (Aus)
Player of the match: Manish Pandey (Sunrisers Hyderabad)

- Sunrisers Hyderabad won the toss and elected to field.

25 October 2020
19:30 (D/N)
Scorecard

Mumbai Indians; 195/5 (20 overs)	v	Rajasthan Royals; 196/2 (18.2 overs)
Hardik Pandya 60* (21); Shreyas Gopal 2/30 (4 overs)		Ben Stokes 107* (60); James Pattinson 2/40 (3.2 overs)

Rajasthan Royals won by 8 wickets
Sheikh Zayed Cricket Stadium, Abu Dhabi
Umpires: Ulhas Gandhe (Ind) and Virender Sharma (Ind)
Player of the match: Ben Stokes (Rajasthan Royals)

- Mumbai Indians won the toss and elected to bat.
- Chennai Super Kings were eliminated as a result of this match.

30 October 2020
19:30 (D/N)
Scorecard

Kings XI Punjab; 185/4 (20 overs)	v	Rajasthan Royals; 186/3 (17.3 overs)
Chris Gayle 99 (63); Jofra Archer 2/26 (4 overs)		Ben Stokes 50 (26); Murugan Ashwin 1/43 (4 overs)

Rajasthan Royals won by 7 wickets
Sheikh Zayed Cricket Stadium, Abu Dhabi
Umpires: Chris Gaffaney (NZ) and Sundaram Ravi (Ind)
Player of the match: Ben Stokes (Rajasthan Royals)

- Rajasthan Royals won the toss and elected to field.
- Chris Gayle (Kings XI Punjab) became the first player to hit 1,000 sixes in T20 cricket.

1 November 2020
19:30 (D/N)
Scorecard

Kolkata Knight Riders; 191/7 (20 overs)	v	Rajasthan Royals; 131/9 (20 overs)
Eoin Morgan 68* (35); Rahul Tewatia 3/25 (4 overs)		Jos Buttler 35 (22); Pat Cummins 4/34 (4 overs)

Kolkata Knight Riders won by 60 runs
Dubai International Cricket Stadium, Dubai
Umpires: Nitin Menon (Ind) and Paul Reiffel (Aus)
Player of the match: Pat Cummins (Kolkata Knight Riders)

- Rajasthan Royals won the toss and elected to field.
- Rajasthan Royals were eliminated as a result of this match.

== Statistics ==
=== Most runs ===
No.	Name	Match	Inns	NO	Runs	HS	Ave.	BF	SR	100s	50s	0	4s	6s
1	Sanju Samson	14	14	1	375	85	28.84	236	158.89	0	3	2	21	23
2	Jos Buttler	13	12	2	328	70*	32.80	227	144.49	0	2	0	27	16
3	Steve Smith	14	14	2	311	69	25.91	237	131.22	0	3	0	32	9
4	Ben Stokes	8	8	1	285	107*	40.71	200	142.50	1	1	0	36	7
5	Rahul Tewatia	14	11	5	255	53	42.50	183	139.34	0	1	0	13	17

- Source:Cricinfo

=== Most wickets ===
No.	Name	Match	Inns	Overs	Maidens	Runs	Wickets	BBI	Ave.	Econ.	SR	4W	5W
1	Jofra Archer	14	14	55.4	0	365	20	3/19	18.25	6.55	16.7	0	0
2	Rahul Tewatia	14	14	46.0	0	326	10	3/25	32.60	7.08	27.6	0	0
3	Shreyas Gopal	14	14	50.0	0	427	10	2/28	42.70	8.54	30.0	0	0
4	Kartik Tyagi	10	10	38.1	0	367	9	2/36	40.77	9.61	25.4	0	0
5	Jaydev Unadkat	7	7	23.0	0	228	4	2/32	57.00	9.91	34.5	0	0

- Source:Cricinfo

== Player of the match awards ==
No.	Date	Player	Opponent	Result	Contribution	Ref.
1	22 September 2020	Sanju Samson	Chennai Super Kings	Won By 16 runs	74 (32)	
2	27 September 2020	Sanju Samson	Kings XI Punjab	Won By 4 wickets	85 (42)	
3	11 October 2020	Rahul Tewatia	Sunrisers Hyderabad	Won by 5 wickets	45* (28)	
4	19 October 2020	Jos Buttler	Chennai Super Kings	Won by 7 wickets	70* (48)	
5	25 October 2020	Ben Stokes	Mumbai Indians	Won by 8 wickets	107* (60)	
6	30 October 2020	Ben Stokes	Kings XI Punjab	Won by 7 wickets	2/32 (4 overs) & 50 (26)	
