= 2020 Mumbai Indians season =

Indian Premier League cricket team season

Mumbai Indians
2020 season
- Coach: Mahela Jayawardene
- Captain: Rohit Sharma
- Ground(s): Wankhede Stadium, Mumbai
- Most runs: Ishan Kishan (516 Runs)
- Most wickets: Jasprit Bumrah (27 wickets)

The 2020 season was the 13th season for the Indian Premier League franchise Mumbai Indians. They were one of the eight teams competing in the 2020 Indian Premier League. Mumbai Indians were the defending champions. The team was captained by Rohit Sharma with Mahela Jayawardene as team coach. They won their fifth title by beating Delhi Capitals on 10 November 2020.

== Background ==
=== Player retention and transfers ===
In July 2019, Mumbai added all-rounder Sherfane Rutherford to their squad, after trading Mayank Markande to Delhi Capitals. They also traded in New Zealand left-arm pacer Trent Boult from Delhi Capitals and right-arm pacer Dhawal Kulkarni from Rajasthan Royals, while trading away batsman Siddhesh Lad to the Kolkata Knight Riders.

The Mumbai Indians retained 15 players and released ten players. On 2 September 2020, James Pattinson replaces Lasith Malinga for Mumbai.

Retained players: Rohit Sharma, Hardik Pandya, Jasprit Bumrah, Krunal Pandya, Ishan Kishan, Surya Kumar Yadav, Rahul Chahar, Anmolpreet Singh, Jayant Yadav, Aditya Tare, Anukul Roy, Quinton de Kock, Kieron Pollard, Lasith Malinga, Mitchell McClenaghan.

Released players: Evin Lewis, Adam Milne, Jason Behrendorff, Beuran Hendricks, Ben Cutting, Yuvraj Singh, Barinder Sran, Rasikh Salam, Pankaj Jaswal, Alzarri Joseph.

Traded In: Sherfane Rutherford, Trent Boult and Dhawal Kulkarni.

Traded Out: Mayank Markande and Siddhesh Lad.

=== Auction ===
Mumbai Indians entered the IPL 2020 auction with a purse of 13.05 crores INR. However, with an extremely strong core, the team hardly had any of the bases uncovered. Yet, MI went on to purchase Chris Lynn, who was released last year by Kolkata Knight Riders, for the base price of 2CR INR and Aussie Nathan Coulter-Nile for a whopping 2CR INR. Also, Indian middle order batsman Saurabh Tiwary, who has been a part of the team before, right arm Indian Pacer, Mohsin Khan and all-rounder Prince Balwant Rai Singh and Maharashtra pacer Digvijay Deshmukh joined the team after being purchased for the base prices of 50L, 20L and, 20L respectively.

Players bought: Chris Lynn, Nathan Coulter-Nile, Saurabh Tiwary, Mohsin Khan, Digvijay Deshmukh, Prince Balwant Rai Singh.

=== Team analysis ===
ESPNcricinfo' wrote "Like Chennai Super Kings, Mumbai Indians also had a limited money, which they made good use for purchasing the players. When Malinga's backup took the team to Coulter Nile, then Chris Lynn was included as a replacement for Evin Lewis. It will be interesting to see how the Mumbai team uses new young domestic players. Only the spin department is a concern for the team."

== Indian Premier League ==
On 19 September, Mumbai Indians lost the opening match against Chennai Super Kings. After losing the toss, Mumbai scored 162 runs with loss of 9 wickets. Chasing a target of 163, Chennai had lost two wickets early, but Ambati Rayudu (71) and Faf du Plessis (58) brilliant inning and their century partnership (115-run) with Faf du Plessis, helped the Super Kings to beat the defending champions. For Mumbai Trent Boult, James Pattinson, Krunal Pandya and Rahul Chahar took 1–1 wickets.

On 23 September, Mumbai Indians won their first match of the season, defeating the Kolkata Knight Riders. Rohit Sharma lost the toss and was put into bat. Rohit scored 80 off 54 balls and Suryakumar Yadav's 47 off 28 balls, set 195-run target for Knight Riders. Chasing a target of 196, the team had lost two wickets in five overs. Shivam Mavi 9 off 10 balls was stumped on the final ball of the match and the Knight Riders could only score 146/9 in 20 overs losing the match by 49 runs.

On 28 September, Mumbai Indians lost their second match against the Royal Challengers Banglore by 7 wickets in a super over. Rohit won the toss and elected to field. Devdutt Padikkal and Aaron Finch built an 81-run partnership for the first wicket and After that Virat Kohli scored 3 runs off 11 balls, in the last 7 overs Royal Challengers scored 105 runs, helping them finish the innings at 201/3 in 20 overs. Chasing a target of 202, Mumbai had lost two wickets in the first two overs, but Ishan Kishan's 99 off 58 balls and a 119-run partnership with Kieron Pollard powered their team to tie the match at 201/5 in 20 overs. In the super over Mumbai could manage only 7 runs only, which was easily chased by the RCB pair featuring Virat Kohli and AB de Villiers. Mumbai went on to win their next 5 matches but they lost to Kings XI Punjab in a second Super Over, followed by a thumping win over the Chennai Super Kings, but lost to Rajasthan Royals in which Ben Stokes scored his second IPL century, followed by a win in the second fixture against RCB. Then they defeated the Delhi Capitals for second time by 9 wickets and then lost to Sunrisers Hyderabad in their final group game by 10 wickets, but still managed to comfortably top the points table. Mumbai played Delhi again in Qualifier 1. Mumbai won comfortably against Delhi by 57 runs due to contributions from Jasprit Bumrah, Ishan Kishan, Hardik Pandya, Quinton de Kock, Suryakumar Yadav and Trent Boult, and reached their sixth IPL final. On 10 November, Mumbai faced against the same team and won the match. Delhi had won the toss and decided to bat first and posted a modest score of 157/5.Mumbai batted second and won the match by 5 wickets to win their fifth IPL title. Rohit Sharma was the top scorer for Mumbai scoring 68 runs and also played his sixth final and his 200th match, whereas Trent Boult was the top named man of the match getting 3 wickets for 30 runs. Mumbai also became the second team after CSK to defend their title successfully, after the latter had done so in the 2010 and 2011 editions of the competition, coincidentally 10 years after the original feat.

== Squad ==
- Players with international caps are listed in **bold**.

No.	Name	Nationality	Birth date	Batting style	Bowling style	Year signed	Salary	Notes
Batsmen
45	**Rohit Sharma**	India	30 April 1987 (aged 33)	Right-handed	Right-arm off break	2018	₹15 crore (US$1.6 million)	Captain
77	Suryakumar Yadav	India	14 September 1990 (aged 30)	Right-handed	Right-arm medium	2018	₹3.2 crore (US$332,000)	
28	Anmolpreet Singh	India	28 March 1998 (aged 22)	Right-handed	Right-arm off break	2019	₹80 lakh (US$83,000)	
68	**Sherfane Rutherford**	Guyana	15 August 1998 (aged 22)	Left-handed	Right-arm fast-medium	2020	₹2 crore (US$210,000)	Overseas
50	**Chris Lynn**	Australia	10 April 1990 (aged 30)	Right-handed	Slow left-arm orthodox	2020	₹2 crore (US$208,000)	Overseas
5	**Saurabh Tiwary**	India	30 December 1989 (aged 30)	Left-handed	Right-arm off break	2020	₹50 lakh (US$52,000)	
All-rounders
55	**Kieron Pollard**	Trinidad and Tobago	12 May 1987 (aged 33)	Right-handed	Right-arm medium-fast	2018	₹5.4 crore (US$561,000)	Vice-Captain, Overseas
33	**Hardik Pandya**	India	11 October 1993 (aged 26)	Right-handed	Right-arm medium-fast	2018	₹11 crore (US$1.1 million)	
36	**Krunal Pandya**	India	24 March 1991 (aged 29)	Left-handed	Slow left-arm orthodox	2018	₹8.8 crore (US$913,814.00)	
—N/a	Digvijay Deshmukh	India	12 April 1998 (aged 22)	Right-handed	Right-arm medium-fast	2020	₹20 lakh (US$21,000)	
—N/a	Prince Balwant Rai Singh	India	5 May 1999 (aged 21)	Right-handed	Right-arm leg break	2020	₹20 lakh (US$21,000)	
Wicket-keepers
23	Ishan Kishan	India	18 July 1998 (aged 22)	Left-handed		2018	₹6.2 crore (US$644,000)	
27	Aditya Tare	India	7 November 1987 (aged 32)	Right-handed		2018	₹20 lakh (US$21,000)	
13	**Quinton de Kock**	South Africa	17 December 1992 (aged 27)	Left-handed		2019	₹2.8 crore (US$291,000)	Overseas
Spin Bowlers
1	**Rahul Chahar**	India	4 August 1999 (aged 21)	Right-handed	Right-arm leg break	2018	₹1.9 crore (US$197,000)	
6	Anukul Roy	India	30 November 1998 (aged 21)	Left-handed	Slow left-arm orthodox	2018	₹20 lakh (US$21,000)	
19	**Jayant Yadav**	India	22 January 1990 (aged 30)	Right-handed	Right-arm off break	2019	₹50 lakh (US$52,000)	
Pace Bowlers
93	**Jasprit Bumrah**	India	6 December 1993 (aged 26)	Right-handed	Right-arm fast-medium	2018	₹7 crore (US$726,897.50)	
81	**Mitchell McClenaghan**	New Zealand	11 June 1986 (aged 34)	Left-handed	Left-arm fast-medium	2018	₹1 crore (US$104,000)	Overseas
99	**Lasith Malinga**	Sri Lanka	27 August 1983 (aged 37)	Right-handed	Right-arm fast	2019	₹2 crore (US$208,000)	Overseas
18	**Trent Boult**	New Zealand	22 July 1989 (aged 31)	Right-handed	Left-arm fast	2020	₹2.2 crore (US$230,000)	Overseas
21	**Dhawal Kulkarni**	India	10 December 1988 (aged 31)	Right-handed	Right-arm medium-fast	2020	₹75 lakh (US$78,000)	
7	**Nathan Coulter-Nile**	Australia	11 October 1987 (aged 32)	Right-handed	Right-arm fast	2020	₹8 crore (US$830,740.00)	Overseas
—N/a	Mohsin Khan	India	15 July 1998 (aged 22)	Left-handed	Left-arm medium-fast	2020	₹20 lakh (US$21,000)	
4	**James Pattinson**	Australia	3 May 1990 (aged 30)	Right-handed	Right-arm fast	2020	₹1 crore (US$103,842.50)	Overseas

== Administration and support staff ==
Position	Name
Owner	Nita Ambani, Akash Ambani, Isha Ambani (Reliance Industries)
CEO	Prakash Iyer
Team manager	Rahul Sanghvi
Director of Cricket Operations	Zaheer Khan
Head coach	Mahela Jayawardene
Batting coach	Robin Singh
Batting mentor	Sachin Tendulkar
Bowling coach	Shane Bond
Fielding coach	James Pamment

== Kit manufacturers and sponsors ==
Kit manufacturer	Shirt sponsor (chest)	Shirt sponsor (back)	Chest Branding
Performax	Samsung	Colors TV	Marriott Bonvoy
Source :

T20 uniform

== Teams and standings ==
=== Results by match ===
Round	1	2	3	4	5	6	7	8	9	10	11	12	13	14
Result	L	W	L	W	W	W	W	W	L	W	L	W	W	L
Position	8	1	5	1	1	1	1	1	2	1	1	1	1	1

Source: Fixtures
W = Win; D = Draw; L = Loss

=== League table ===
Pos	Team	Pld	W	L	NR	Pts	NRR	Qualification
1	Mumbai Indians (C)	14	9	5	0	18	1.107	Advance to Qualifier 1
2	Delhi Capitals (R)	14	8	6	0	16	−0.109	Advance to Qualifier 1
3	Sunrisers Hyderabad (3rd)	14	7	7	0	14	0.608	Advance to Eliminator
4	Royal Challengers Bangalore (4th)	14	7	7	0	14	−0.172	Advance to Eliminator
5	Kolkata Knight Riders	14	7	7	0	14	−0.214	
6	Kings XI Punjab	14	6	8	0	12	−0.162	
7	Chennai Super Kings	14	6	8	0	12	−0.455	
8	Rajasthan Royals	14	6	8	0	12	−0.569	

Source: IPLT20.com
The four top ranked teams qualify for the playoffs.

== League stage ==
19 September 2020
19:30 (D/N)
Scorecard

Mumbai Indians; 162/9 (20 overs)	v	Chennai Super Kings; 166/5 (19.2 overs)
Saurabh Tiwary 42 (31); Lungi Ngidi 3/38 (4 overs)		Ambati Rayudu 71 (48); Trent Boult 1/23 (3.2 overs)

Chennai Super Kings won by 5 wickets
Sheikh Zayed Cricket Stadium, Abu Dhabi
Umpires: Chris Gaffaney (NZ) and Virender Sharma (Ind)
Player of the match: Ambati Rayudu (Chennai Super Kings)

- Chennai Super Kings won the toss and elected to field.

23 September 2020
19:30 (D/N)
Scorecard

Mumbai Indians; 195/5 (20 overs)	v	Kolkata Knight Riders; 146/9 (20 overs)
Rohit Sharma 80 (54); Shivam Mavi 2/32 (4 overs)		Pat Cummins 33 (12); James Pattinson 2/25 (4 overs)

Mumbai Indians won by 49 runs
Sheikh Zayed Cricket Stadium, Abu Dhabi
Umpires: Chris Gaffaney (NZ) and Sundaram Ravi (Ind)
Player of the match: Rohit Sharma (Mumbai Indians)

- Kolkata Knight Riders won the toss and elected to field.

28 September 2020
19:30 (D/N)
Scorecard

Royal Challengers Bangalore; 201/3 (20 overs)	v	Mumbai Indians; 201/5 (20 overs)
AB de Villiers 55* (24); Trent Boult 2/34 (4 overs)		Ishan Kishan 99 (58); Isuru Udana 2/45 (4 overs)

Match tied
(Royal Challengers Bangalore won the Super Over)
Dubai International Cricket Stadium, Dubai
Umpires: Nitin Menon (Ind) and Paul Reiffel (Aus)
Player of the match: AB de Villiers (Royal Challengers Bangalore)

- Mumbai Indians won the toss and elected to field.
- Super Over: Mumbai Indians 7/1 (1 over), Royal Challengers Bangalore 11/0 (1 over)

1 October 2020
19:30 (D/N)
Scorecard

Mumbai Indians; 191/4 (20 overs)	v	Kings XI Punjab; 143/8 (20 overs)
Rohit Sharma 70 (45); Sheldon Cottrell 1/20 (4 overs)		Nicholas Pooran 44 (27); Jasprit Bumrah 2/18 (4 overs)

Mumbai Indians won by 48 runs
Sheikh Zayed Cricket Stadium, Abu Dhabi
Umpires: Sundaram Ravi (Ind) and Virender Sharma (Ind)
Player of the match: Kieron Pollard (Mumbai Indians)

- Kings XI Punjab won the toss and elected to field.
- Rohit Sharma (Mumbai Indians) became the third player to reach 5,000 IPL runs.

4 October 2020
15:30
Scorecard

Mumbai Indians; 208/5 (20 overs)	v	Sunrisers Hyderabad; 174/7 (20 overs)
Quinton de Kock 67 (39); Sandeep Sharma 2/41 (4 overs)		David Warner 60 (44); Trent Boult 2/28 (4 overs)

Mumbai Indians won by 34 runs
Sharjah Cricket Stadium, Sharjah
Umpires: K. N. Ananthapadmanabhan (Ind) and Richard Illingworth (Eng)
Player of the match: Trent Boult (Mumbai Indians)

- Mumbai Indians won the toss and elected to bat.

6 October 2020
19:30 (D/N)
Scorecard

Mumbai Indians; 193/4 (20 overs)	v	Rajasthan Royals; 136 (18.1 overs)
Suryakumar Yadav 79* (47); Shreyas Gopal 2/28 (4 overs)		Jos Buttler 70 (44); Jasprit Bumrah 4/20 (4 overs)

Mumbai Indians won by 57 runs
Sheikh Zayed Cricket Stadium, Abu Dhabi
Umpires: Sundaram Ravi (Ind) and Virender Sharma (Ind)
Player of the match: Suryakumar Yadav (Mumbai Indians)

- Mumbai Indians won the toss and elected to bat.
- Kartik Tyagi (Rajasthan Royals) made his T20 debut.

11 October 2020
19:30 (D/N)
Scorecard

Delhi Capitals; 162/4 (20 overs)	v	Mumbai Indians; 166/5 (19.4 overs)
Shikhar Dhawan 69* (52); Krunal Pandya 2/26 (4 overs)		Suryakumar Yadav 53 (32); Kagiso Rabada 2/28 (4 overs)

Mumbai Indians won by 5 wickets
Sheikh Zayed Cricket Stadium, Abu Dhabi
Umpires: Chris Gaffaney (NZ) and Sundaram Ravi (Ind)
Player of the match: Quinton de Kock (Mumbai Indians)

- Delhi Capitals won the toss and elected to bat.

16 October 2020
19:30 (D/N)
Scorecard

Kolkata Knight Riders; 148/5 (20 overs)	v	Mumbai Indians; 149/2 (16.5 overs)
Pat Cummins 53* (36); Rahul Chahar 2/18 (4 overs)		Quinton de Kock 78* (44); Varun Chakravarthy 1/23 (4 overs)

Mumbai Indians won by 8 wickets
Sheikh Zayed Cricket Stadium, Abu Dhabi
Umpires: Chris Gaffaney (NZ) and Virender Sharma (Ind)
Player of the match: Quinton de Kock (Mumbai Indians)

- Kolkata Knight Riders won the toss and elected to bat.

18 October 2020
19:30 (D/N)
Scorecard

Mumbai Indians; 176/6 (20 overs)	v	Kings XI Punjab; 176/6 (20 overs)
Quinton de Kock 53 (43); Mohammed Shami 2/30 (4 overs)		K. L. Rahul 77 (51); Jasprit Bumrah 3/24 (4 overs)

Match tied and Super Over tied
(Kings XI Punjab won the second Super Over)
Dubai International Cricket Stadium, Dubai
Umpires: Nitin Menon (Ind) and Paul Reiffel (Aus)
Player of the match: K. L. Rahul (Kings XI Punjab)

- Mumbai Indians won the toss and elected to bat.
- Super Over 1: Kings XI Punjab 5/2 (1 over), Mumbai Indians 5/1 (1 over) - Tied.
- Super Over 2: Mumbai Indians 11/1 (1 over), Kings XI Punjab 15/0 (0.4 overs)

23 October 2020
19:30 (D/N)
Scorecard

Chennai Super Kings; 114/9 (20 overs)	v	Mumbai Indians; 116/0 (12.2 overs)
Sam Curran 52 (47); Trent Boult 4/18 (4 overs)		Ishan Kishan 68* (37)

Mumbai Indians won by 10 wickets
Sharjah Cricket Stadium, Sharjah
Umpires: Vineet Kulkarni (Ind) and Chettithody Shamshuddin (Ind)
Player of the match: Trent Boult (Mumbai Indians)

- Mumbai Indians won the toss and elected to field.

25 October 2020
19:30 (D/N)
Scorecard

Mumbai Indians; 195/5 (20 overs)	v	Rajasthan Royals; 196/2 (18.2 overs)
Hardik Pandya 60* (21); Shreyas Gopal 2/30 (4 overs)		Ben Stokes 107* (60); James Pattinson 2/40 (3.2 overs)

Rajasthan Royals won by 8 wickets
Sheikh Zayed Cricket Stadium, Abu Dhabi
Umpires: Ulhas Gandhe (Ind) and Virender Sharma (Ind)
Player of the match: Ben Stokes (Rajasthan Royals)

- Mumbai Indians won the toss and elected to bat.
- Chennai Super Kings were eliminated as a result of this match.

28 October 2020
19:30 (D/N)
Scorecard

Royal Challengers Bangalore; 164/6 (20 overs)	v	Mumbai Indians; 166/5 (19.1 overs)
Devdutt Padikkal 74 (45); Jasprit Bumrah 3/14 (4 overs)		Suryakumar Yadav 79* (43); Mohammed Siraj 2/28 (3.1 overs)

Mumbai Indians won by 5 wickets
Sheikh Zayed Cricket Stadium, Abu Dhabi
Umpires: Chris Gaffaney (NZ) and Ulhas Gandhe (Ind)
Player of the match: Suryakumar Yadav (Mumbai Indians)

- Mumbai Indians won the toss and elected to field.

31 October 2020
15:30
Scorecard

Delhi Capitals; 110/9 (20 overs)	v	Mumbai Indians; 111/1 (14.2 overs)
Shreyas Iyer 25 (29); Jasprit Bumrah 3/17 (4 overs)		Ishan Kishan 72* (47); Anrich Nortje 1/25 (2.2 overs)

Mumbai Indians won by 9 wickets
Dubai International Cricket Stadium, Dubai
Umpires: Yeshwant Barde (Ind) and Paul Reiffel (Aus)
Player of the match: Ishan Kishan (Mumbai Indians)

- Mumbai Indians won the toss and elected to field.
- Mumbai Indians advanced to Qualifier 1 as a result of this match.

3 November 2020
19:30 (D/N)
Scorecard

Mumbai Indians; 149/8 (20 overs)	v	Sunrisers Hyderabad; 151/0 (17.1 overs)
Kieron Pollard 41 (25); Sandeep Sharma 3/34 (4 overs)		David Warner 85* (58)

Sunrisers Hyderabad won by 10 wickets
Sharjah Cricket Stadium, Sharjah
Umpires: Richard Illingworth (Eng) and Chettithody Shamshuddin (Ind)
Player of the match: Shahbaz Nadeem (Sunrisers Hyderabad)

- Sunrisers Hyderabad won the toss and elected to field.
- Sunrisers Hyderabad qualified for the playoffs for the fifth consecutive time and Kolkata Knight Riders were eliminated as a result of this match.

== Playoffs ==
Qualifier 1

5 November 2020
19:30 (D/N)
Scorecard

Mumbai Indians; 200/5 (20 overs)	v	Delhi Capitals; 143/8 (20 overs)
Ishan Kishan 55* (30); Ravichandran Ashwin 3/29 (4 overs)		Marcus Stoinis 65 (46); Jasprit Bumrah 4/14 (4 overs)

Mumbai Indians won by 57 runs
Dubai International Cricket Stadium, Dubai
Umpires: Chris Gaffaney (NZ) and Nitin Menon (Ind)
Player of the match: Jasprit Bumrah (Mumbai Indians)

- Delhi Capitals won the toss and elected to field.

=== Final ===
10 November 2020
19:30 (D/N)
Scorecard

Delhi Capitals; 156/7 (20 overs)	v	Mumbai Indians; 157/5 (18.4 overs)
Shreyas Iyer 65* (50); Trent Boult 3/30 (4 overs)		Rohit Sharma 68 (51); Anrich Nortje 2/25 (2.4 overs)

Mumbai Indians won by 5 wickets
Dubai International Cricket Stadium, Dubai
Umpires: Chris Gaffaney (NZ) and Nitin Menon (Ind)
Player of the match: Trent Boult (Mumbai Indians)

- Delhi Capitals won the toss and elected to bat.
- This was the fifth IPL title for the Mumbai Indians and they became the second team to win consecutive IPL trophies after Chennai Super Kings in 2010 and 2011.

== Statistics ==
=== Most runs ===
No.	Name	Match	Inns	NO	Runs	HS	Ave.	BF	SR	100s	50s	0	4s	6s
1	Ishan Kishan	14	13	4	516	99	57.33	354	145.76	0	4	1	36	30
2	Quinton de Kock	16	16	2	503	78*	35.92	358	140.50	0	4	1	46	22
3	Suryakumar Yadav	16	15	3	480	79*	40.00	331	145.01	0	4	2	61	11
4	Rohit Sharma	12	12	0	332	80	27.66	260	127.69	0	3	1	27	19
5	Hardik Pandya	14	13	5	281	60*	35.12	157	178.98	0	1	1	14	25

- Source:Cricinfo

=== Most wickets ===
No.	Name	Match	Inns	Overs	Maidens	Runs	Wickets	BBI	Ave.	Econ.	SR	4W	5W
1	Jasprit Bumrah	15	15	60.0	2	404	27	4/14	14.96	6.73	13.3	2	0
2	Trent Boult	15	15	57.2	3	457	25	4/18	18.28	7.97	13.7	1	0
3	Rahul Chahar	15	15	53.0	0	433	15	2/18	28.86	8.16	21.2	0	0
4	James Pattinson	10	10	35.3	0	320	11	2/19	29.09	9.01	19.3	0	0
5	Krunal Pandya	16	16	50.1	0	380	6	2/26	63.33	7.57	50.1	0	0

- Source:Cricinfo

== Player of the match awards ==
No.	Date	Player	Opponent	Result	Contribution	Ref.
1	23 September 2020	Rohit Sharma	Kolkata Knight Riders	Won by 49 runs	80 (54)	
2	1 October 2020	Kieron Pollard	Kings XI Punjab	Won by 48 runs	47 (20)	
3	4 October 2020	Trent Boult	Sunrisers Hyderabad	Won by 34 runs	2/28 (4 overs)	
4	6 October 2020	Suryakumar Yadav	Rajasthan Royals	Won by 57 runs	79* (47)	
5	11 October 2020	Quinton de Kock	Delhi Capitals	Won by 5 wickets	53 (36)	
6	16 October 2020	Quinton de Kock	Kolkata Knight Riders	Won by 8 wickets	78* (44)	
7	23 October 2020	Trent Boult	Chennai Super Kings	Won by 10 wickets	4/18 (4 overs)	
8	28 October 2020	Suryakumar Yadav	Royal Challengers Bangalore	Won by 5 wickets	79* (43)	
9	31 October 2020	Ishan Kishan	Delhi Capitals	Won by 9 wickets	72* (47)	
10	5 November 2020 - Qualifier 1	Jasprit Bumrah	Delhi Capitals	Won by 57 runs and advanced to the final.	4/14 (4 overs)	
11	10 November 2020 - final	Trent Boult	Delhi Capitals	Won by 5 wickets and became Winner of the 2020 IPL	3/30 (4 overs)	
