= Basu Shanker =

Indian performance coach

Basu Shanker (born 3 August 1968) is an Indian performance coach. He was the Head Strength and Conditioning Coach of the India national cricket team. He trained top athletes, including Virat Kohli, Ravichandran Ashwin, Dipika Pallikal Karthik and Dinesh Karthik. He is the strength and conditioning coach of the Royal Challengers Bangalore. He has also starred in movies such as Moonu and Ethir Neechal.

== Career ==
In the 1980s and 1990s, Basu was a sprinter. His quest towards excellence led him to the fitness field in the 1990s. He is now regarded as one of the best strength and conditioning coaches in the world and the most sought after coach.

== Personal life ==
Basu was born on 3 August 1968 in Chennai. His parents were Shanker Narayanan and Shantha Shanker. He is married to Anurita Basu and has a son and daughter. His son Arjun Basu is also a strength and conditioning coach and he earned a Master’s Degree from Leeds Beckett University. His daughter is Shruthi Basu.
