= Kamlesh Nagarkoti =

Indian cricketer (born 1999)

Personal information
- Full name: Kamlesh Lachham Nagarkoti
- Born: 28 December 1999 (age 26); Barmer, Rajasthan, India
- Height: 5 ft 8 in (173 cm)
- Batting: Right-handed
- Bowling: Right-arm fast
- Role: Bowler

Domestic team information
- Years: Team
- 2017/18–present: Rajasthan
- 2020–2021: Kolkata Knight Riders (squad no. 5)
- 2022: Delhi Capitals (squad no. 5)
- 2025: Chennai Super Kings (squad no. 51)
- LA debut: 26 February 2017 Rajasthan v Mumbai
- T20 debut: 26 September 2020 Kolkata Knight Riders v Sunrisers Hyderabad

Career statistics
Competition	FC	LA	T20
Matches	3	25	32
Runs scored	29	177	109
Batting average	5.80	13.61	9.90
100s/50s	0/0	0/1	0/0
Top score	12	56*	39*
Balls bowled	428	1,114	607
Wickets	7	34	29
Bowling average	42.28	26.38	27.06
5 wickets in innings	0	0	0
10 wickets in match	0	–	–
Best bowling	2/35	4/42	3/14
Catches/stumpings	3/–	4/–	11/–
- Source: ESPNcricinfo, 25 March 2025

Kamlesh Lachham Nagarkoti (born 28 December 1999) is an Indian cricketer. He made his List A debut for Rajasthan in the 2016–17 Vijay Hazare Trophy on 26 February 2017. Two days later, he took the first-ever hat-trick for Rajasthan in List A cricket, in the Vijay Hazare Trophy match against Gujarat.

Nagarkoti's father was a subedar in the Indian Army. He utilized his retirement corpus to buy a one-bedroom apartment in Jaipur so his son could learn to play cricket. Nagarkoti's childhood coach was Surendra Singh Rathod.

In December 2017, he was named in India's squad for the 2018 Under-19 Cricket World Cup. In January 2018, he was bought by the Kolkata Knight Riders in the 2018 IPL auction for ₹3.2 crores. However, he did not play a match due to injury concerns. Despite that, he was retained for the next season. Just ahead of the 2019 Indian Premier League he was again ruled out of the tournament due to back injury.

In November 2019, he was named in India's squad for the 2019 ACC Emerging Teams Asia Cup in Bangladesh. He made his Twenty20 debut for the Kolkata Knight Riders in the 2020 Indian Premier League on 26 September 2020.

On 26 October 2020, Nagarkoti was named as one of four additional bowlers to travel with the India cricket team for their tour to Australia. However, on 9 November 2020, Nagarkoti, was ruled out of the tour due to the management of his workload.

In February 2022, he was bought by the Delhi Capitals in the auction for the 2022 Indian Premier League tournament. He made his first-class debut on 24 February 2022, for Rajasthan in the 2021–22 Ranji Trophy.
