= Mohammed Siraj =

Indian cricketer (born 1993)

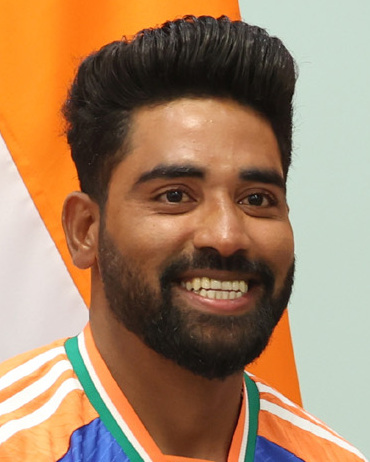
- Siraj in 2024

Personal information
- Born: 13 March 1994 (age 32); Secunderabad, Andhra Pradesh, India (present-day Telangana)
- Nickname: Miya Magic
- Height: 1.78 m (5 ft 10 in)
- Batting: Right-handed
- Bowling: Right-arm fast
- Role: Bowler

International information
- National side: India (2017–present)
- Test debut (cap 298): 26 December 2020 v Australia
- Last Test: 6 June 2026 v Afghanistan
- ODI debut (cap 225): 15 January 2019 v Australia
- Last ODI: 18 January 2026 v New Zealand
- ODI shirt no.: 73
- T20I debut (cap 71): 4 November 2017 v New Zealand
- Last T20I: 7 February 2026 v USA
- T20I shirt no.: 73

Domestic team information
- Years: Team
- 2015–2016: Hyderabad
- 2017: Sunrisers Hyderabad
- 2018–2024: Royal Challengers Bengaluru
- 2022: Warwickshire
- 2025–present: Gujarat Titans

Career statistics
Competition	Test	ODI	T20I	FC
Matches	46	50	17	91
Runs scored	176	57	14	613
Batting average	4.88	7.12	7.00	7.29
100s/50s	0/0	0/0	0/0	0/0
Top score	22	9*	7*	46
Balls bowled	7,085	2,251	372	15,176
Wickets	140	76	17	316
Bowling average	29.74	25.32	28.29	26.69
5 wickets in innings	5	1	0	10
10 wickets in match	0	0	0	2
Best bowling	6/15	6/21	4/17	8/59
Catches/stumpings	23/–	7/–	7/–	29/–
Medal record
Men's cricket
Representing India
ICC World Test Championship
Runner-up	2019–2021
Runner-up	2021–2023
ICC Cricket World Cup
Runner-up	2023 India
ICC T20 World Cup
Winner	2024 West Indies & USA
Winner	2026 India & Sri Lanka
ACC Asia Cup
Winner	2023 Pakistan
- Source: ESPNcricinfo, 8 June 2026

Mohammed Siraj (born 13 March 1994) is an Indian international cricketer who plays as a right-arm fast bowler for the India national team. He plays for Gujarat Titans in the Indian Premier League and Hyderabad in domestic cricket. He was a part of the squad which won the 2023 Asia Cup and was the Player of the Match in the final. Siraj was also a member of the team that won the 2024 and 2026 T20 World Cups. He was named as one of the Wisden Cricketers of the Year in the 2026 Wisden Cricketers' Almanack. He is also an honorary Deputy Superintendent of Police in Hyderabad.

== Early life ==
Siraj was born on 13 March 1994 in Secunderabad, Andhra Pradesh, India (present-day Telangana) to a Hyderabadi Muslim family. His father, Mirza Mohammed Ghaus, was an auto rickshaw driver, and his mother, Shabana Begum, is a housewife. His elder brother, Mohammed Ismail, is an engineer. Siraj started playing club cricket at the age of 19 after first starting bowling aged 16, with a tennis ball. In his first match, he took 9 wickets for his uncle's team in the Hyderabad Cricket Association.

== Domestic career ==
Siraj made his first-class debut on 15 November 2015 under the coaching of Karthik Udupa playing for Hyderabad in the 2015–16 Ranji Trophy tournament. He made his Twenty20 debut on 2 January 2016 in the 2015–16 Syed Mushtaq Ali Trophy tournament. During the 2016–17 Ranji Trophy tournament, he was the highest wicket-taker for Hyderabad with 41 wickets at an average of 18.92.

In February 2018, he finished as the leading wicket-taker in the 2017–18 Vijay Hazare Trophy, with 23 dismissals in just seven matches. In October 2018, he was named in India A's squad for the 2018–19 Deodhar Trophy. In October 2019, he was named in India B's squad for the 2019–20 Deodhar Trophy.

== International career ==
In October 2017, he was named in India's Twenty20 International (T20I) squad for their series against New Zealand. He made his T20I debut for India against New Zealand on 4 November 2017, taking the wicket of Kane Williamson, finishing with figures of 1 wicket for 53 runs from four overs.

In February 2018, he was named in India's Twenty20 International (T20I) squad for the 2018 Nidahas Trophy. In September 2018, he was named in India's Test squad for their series against the West Indies, but he did not play. In December 2018, he was named in India's One Day International (ODI) squad for their series against Australia. He made his ODI debut against Australia at the Adelaide Oval on 15 January 2019.

On 26 October 2020, Siraj was named in India's Test squad for their series against Australia. After some deliberation to choose between Navdeep Saini and Siraj following an injury to Mohammad Shami, Siraj was chosen ahead of Saini, and he made his Test debut for India on 26 December 2020, against Australia. His first Test wicket was of Marnus Labuschagne. In January 2021, during the fourth Test of the series against Australia, Siraj took his first five-wicket haul in Test cricket.

In January 2023, Siraj played important role in the Ind vs NZ ODI series. He took 4 wickets in the first ODI which helped the team to win the match for 12 runs.

On 21 January 2023, Siraj became the No. 1 ODI Bowler in ICC ODI Rankings for Bowlers.

On 21 August 2023, Siraj was selected to play for India and his name was included in the 15 Man squad announced by BCCI ahead of 2023 Asia Cup.

On 17 September 2023, in the Asia Cup final, Siraj became the joint fastest bowler to take a 6 wicket haul in ODIs equaling Chaminda Vaas's record of taking 5 wicket in 16 balls against Bangladesh in 2003 World Cup. He ended with a career best figure of 6/21 and also became the 1st Indian to take 4 wickets in an over.

In May 2024, he was named in India's squad for the 2024 ICC Men's T20 World Cup tournament.

In June 2025, he was named in India's squad for the inaugural Anderson–Tendulkar Trophy. During the series, he got his fourth and fifth 5-wicket hauls in tests, claiming 6 wickets in the first innings of the second match and 5 wickets in the second innings of the fifth match. He was awarded the Player of the Match award for his latter performance. He was also the highest wicket-taker of the series, taking 23 total wickets in 9 innings.

== Franchise career ==
In February 2017, he was bought by the Sunrisers Hyderabad team for the 2017 Indian Premier League (IPL) for 2.6 crores. In January 2018, he was bought by the Royal Challengers Bangalore in the 2018 IPL auction.

On 21 October 2020, he became the first bowler in IPL history to bowl back to back maiden overs in a single match.

In November 2024, he was bought by Gujarat Titans in the 2025 IPL Mega Auction for 12.25 Crores.

== Off the field ==
Siraj was made an honorary Deputy Superintendent of Police in Hyderabad on 11 October 2024.

In July 2025, Siraj launched his restaurant named Joharfa in Banjara Hills, Hyderabad.
