= Curran (surname) =

Curran is an Irish surname. The surname (and many current derivatives) derives from a number of unrelated Irish families.

- Ó Corráin – at least three distinct families of the name located in what are now counties Tipperary, Waterford, Galway, Leitrim, Kerry and Fermanagh. The Currans of Kerry are said to have originated with the Ui Charrain, of the Uí Meic Caille sept of the Uí Liatháin kings of Munster. The Uí Liatháin descended from Eochu Liathán ("Eochu the Grey"), son of Dáire Cerbba, who was, according to the Munster epic Forbhais Droma Dámhgháire, king of Medón Mairtine. According to the Annals of Inisfallen, the modern-day presence of the Curran family in County Kerry is the result of the war in 1177 between Domnall Mór Ua Briain, King of Thomond, and Diarmait Mor Mac Carthaigh, during which the Uí Meic Caille fled across the Lee; for some this departure was permanent, with many Currans becoming Kerry gentry. Descendants Thomas and Dowenald O Corran were amongst those summoned to serve in arms against the Earl of Desmond in 1345.
- Ó Cuirín – County Donegal
- Mac Corraidhín – apparently now rendered as Crean in County Kerry
- Curran - is still also prevalent in Ulster/Northern Ireland; for example in Warringstown (see reference to Professor Richard Curran below)

The surname is common in all four provinces in Ireland, but especially in County Donegal and throughout Ulster. The name is also prevalent in the south of Ireland, appearing many times in the County Tipperary Hearth Money Rolls of 1665–67. Currans showed up frequently as Waterford residents in the census of 1659.

== People ==
- Alex Curran (born 1982), British fashion model and columnist, wife of footballer Steven Gerrard
- Alvin Curran (born 1938), American composer
- Barbara A. Curran (1940–2022), American politician, judge and lawyer
- Ben Curran (born 1996), English cricketer, brother of Sam and Tom
- Brian Curran (born 1963), Canadian ice hockey player
- Brittany Curran (born 1990), American actress
- Charles Curran (disambiguation)
- Chuck Curran (born 1939), American politician
- Clare Curran (born 1960), New Zealand politician
- Connor Curran (born 2004), American freestyle skier
- Dennis Patrick Curran (born 1953), American chemist
- Denny Curran (1875–1968), Irish sportsman and politician
- Donnchadh Ó Corráin, Irish historian
- Frances Curran (born 1961), Scottish politician
- Frank Curran (disambiguation)
- Gerald Curran (1939–2013), American politician
- Harry Curran (born 1966), Scottish footballer
- Harry Curran (American football) (1894–1976), American football player
- Henry 'Babe' Curran (1896–1964), Australian wool-grower
- Henry M. Curran (1918–1993), New York politician
- Homer Curran (1885–1952), American theatrical producer
- Hugh McCollum Curran (1875–1960), American forester
- J. Joseph Curran Jr. (born 1931), American politician
- Jack Curran (1930–2013), American high school baseball and basketball coach
- Jack Curran (broadcaster) (1932–2003), Canadian broadcaster
- Jack Curran (footballer) (1898–after 1932), Irish footballer
- Jesse Curran (born 1996), Australian soccer player
- Jimmy Curran (1880–1963), Scots/American athlete and athletics coach
- Joan Curran (1916–1999), Welsh physicist, inventor of "chaff" radar countermeasures
- John Curran (disambiguation)
- Joseph Curran (disambiguation)
- Joshua Curran (born 1999), Australian rugby league footballer
- Kevin Curran (disambiguation)
- Kyliegh Curran (born 2005), American actress
- Mairead Curran (born 1968), Australian voiceover artist
- Margaret Curran (disambiguation)
- Mary Katharine Curran (1844–1920), American botanist
- Matthew Curran (1882–1938), Irish boxer of the 1900s–1920s
- Mike Curran (born 1944), American ice-hockey player
- Nick Curran (born 1977), American rock/blues musician
- Oisin Curran, Canadian writer
- Paul Curran (disambiguation)
- Pearl Lenore Curran (1883–1937), American author who wrote as Patience Worth
- Pete Curran (1860–1910), British trade unionist and politician, Member of Parliament for Jarrow
- Robert Curran (disambiguation)
- Rose Curran (Collins), Irish camogie player
- Sam Curran (born 1998), English cricketer; brother of Tom Curran
- Samuel Curran (1912–1998), British physicist and founder of the University of Strathclyde
- Sarah Curran (1782–1808), daughter of John Philpot Curran and wife of Robert Emmet
- Séamus Ó Cuirrín, Bishop of Killaloe (1526–1542)
- Sean Curran (disambiguation)
- Shane Curran (disambiguation)
- Simon Ó Cuirrin, Bishop of Kilfenora 1300–1302
- Terry Curran (born 1955), English footballer
- Tom Curran (disambiguation)
- Tony Curran, Scottish actor
- Vinny Curran, American actor
- William Curran (disambiguation)

== Fictional characters ==
- Curran (Eyes of the Dragon), in Stephen King's The Eyes of the Dragon
- Jenny Curran, in the film Forrest Gump played by Robin Wright Penn
- Detective Nick Curran, in the movie Basic Instinct played by Michael Douglas
- Amanda (Mandy) Curran, in Stanley Kubrick's film Eyes Wide Shut played by Julienne Davis
- Luke Curran, in the British Sitcom Lovesick played by Daniel Ings

== See also ==
- Attorney General Curran (disambiguation)
- Judge Curran (disambiguation)
- Senator Curran (disambiguation)
