= Tom Curran =

Tom Curran or Curren may refer to:

- Tom Curran (cricketer) (born 1995), English cricketer
- Tom Curran (hurler) (1920–2005), Irish hurler
- Tom Curran (medical researcher) (born 1956), Scottish medic
- Tom Curran (rower) (1910–1990), American Olympic rower
- Tom Curren (born 1964), American surfer
- Tom Curren (footballer) (born 1992), Australian rules footballer

== See also ==
- Thomas Curran (disambiguation)
