= Thomas Curran =

Thomas Curran may refer to:

- Thomas Curran (university president) (born 1955), President of Rockhurst University in Kansas City, Missouri
- Thomas J. Curran (1898–1958), Secretary of State of New York, 1943–1955
- Thomas John Curran (1924–2012), U.S. federal judge
- Thomas A. Curran (1879–1941), American actor
- Thomas Curran (South Sligo MP) (1840–1913), Member of Parliament (MP) for South Sligo, 1892–1900
- Thomas Bartholomew Curran (1870–1929), his son, barrister and MP for the constituencies of Kilkenny City and North Donegal
- Thomas Curran (Illinois politician) (1868–1928), American businessman and politician
- Tom Curran (cricketer) (born 1995), South African-born English cricketer

== See also ==
- Tom Curren (born 1964), American surfer
- Tom Curren (footballer) (born 1992), Australian rules footballer
