= Kevin Curran =

Kevin Curran may refer to:

- Kevin Curran (cricketer) (1959–2012), Zimbabwean cricketer
- Kevin Curran (cricketer, born 1928) (1928–2017), Zimbabwean cricketer
- Kevin Curran (footballer, born 1919) (1919–1986), Australian rules footballer for Richmond
- Kevin Curran (footballer, born 1920) (1920–1978), Australian rules footballer for Hawthorn
- Kevin Curran (trade unionist) (born 1954), British trade unionist
- Kevin Curran (writer) (1957–2016), American writer

== See also ==
- Kevin Curren (born 1958), South African former tennis player
