= 1942 Maryland Attorney General election =

- November 3, 1942

Nominee	William C. Walsh	Horace P. Whitworth
Party	Democratic	Republican
Popular vote	192,946	125,018
Percentage	60.68%	39.32%
- County results Walsh: 50–60% 60–70% Whitworth: 50–60% 60–70%
Attorney General before election
William C. Walsh
Democratic
Elected Attorney General
William C. Walsh
Democratic

The 1942 Maryland attorney general election was held on November 3, 1942, in order to elect the attorney general of Maryland. Democratic nominee and incumbent attorney general William C. Walsh defeated Republican nominee Horace P. Whitworth.

== General election ==
On election day, November 3, 1942, Democratic nominee William C. Walsh won re-election by a margin of 67,928 votes against his opponent Republican nominee Horace P. Whitworth, thereby retaining Democratic control over the office of attorney general. Walsh was sworn in for his second term on January 3, 1943.

=== Results ===
Maryland Attorney General election, 1942
Party	Candidate	Votes	%
Democratic	William C. Walsh (incumbent)	192,946	60.68
Republican	Horace P. Whitworth	125,018	39.32
Total votes		317,964	100.00
Democratic hold			
