= 1938 Maryland Attorney General election =

- November 8, 1938

Nominee	William C. Walsh	Leo Weinberg
Party	Democratic	Republican
Popular vote	289,245	170,681
Percentage	62.48%	36.87%
- County results Walsh: 50–60% 60–70% 70–80% Weinberg: 50–60%
Attorney General before election
Herbert O'Conor
Democratic
Elected Attorney General
William C. Walsh
Democratic

The 1938 Maryland attorney general election was held on November 8, 1938, in order to elect the attorney general of Maryland. Democratic nominee William C. Walsh defeated Republican nominee Leo Weinberg and Labor nominee Morris Levitt.

== General election ==
On election day, November 8, 1938, Democratic nominee William C. Walsh won the election by a margin of 118,564 votes against his foremost opponent Republican nominee Leo Weinberg, thereby retaining Democratic control over the office of attorney general. Walsh was sworn in as the 33rd attorney general of Maryland on January 3, 1939.

=== Results ===
Maryland Attorney General election, 1938
Party	Candidate	Votes	%
Democratic	William C. Walsh	289,245	62.48
Republican	Leo Weinberg	170,681	36.87
Labor	Morris Levitt	2,981	0.65
Total votes		462,907	100.00
Democratic hold			
