= John Curran =

John, Johnny, or Jack Curran may refer to:

== Arts and entertainment ==
- John Elliott Curran (1848–1890), American author
- John Curran (director) (born 1960), American film director and writer
- John Curran (Agatha Christie expert), Irish literary scholar and archivist

== Law and politics ==
- John Philpot Curran (1750–1817), Irish lawyer and politician
- John Joseph Curran (1842–1909), Canadian politician and lawyer
- John M. Curran (1868–1935), American politician and lawyer in Illinois
- John Curran (Irish politician) (born 1960), Irish politician
- John Curran (Illinois politician), American politician

== Sports ==
- John Curran (baseball) (1852–1896), Irish baseball player, often misidentified as Peter Curren
- John Curran (footballer) (1864–?), Scottish footballer
- Johnny Curran (1924–1985), Scottish footballer
- Jack Curran (1930–2013), American baseball and basketball coach

== Others ==
- John Oliver Curran (1819–1847), Irish physician
- John Curran (financial journalist) (1953–2013), American financial journalist
- John Curran (news correspondent) (1957–2011), American journalist
- John Curran (businessman) (born 1964), American businessman

== See also ==
- Jon Curran (born 1987), American golfer
- John Currin (born 1962), American painter
