= Superstars of Wrestling (Canadian TV series) =

1970s professional wrestling program

- Created by: George Cannon; Milt Avruskin
- Presented by: George Cannon; Milt Avruskin; Jack Curran
- Starring: Superstars of Wrestling roster
- Opening theme: "The Ox" by The Who
- Countries of origin: Canada; United States
- No. of seasons: 8

Production
- Production locations: Windsor, Ontario; Detroit, Michigan
- Camera setup: Multicamera setup
- Running time: Approximately 45-48 minutes per episode; (60 minutes with commercials)
- Production company: Contact Sports Inc.

Original release
- Network: CBET-TV (1975–1984)
- Release: 1975 – 1984

Related
- Universal Wrestling; WWF Superstars of Wrestling; International Wrestling

Superstars of Wrestling, also sometimes known as the Canadian Wrestling Association, (Note: The Canadian-American Wrestling Association was created as a sanctioning body for the promotion early in its history. The show's championships and live events were promoted under the Canadian Wrestling Association name in select markets. The "CWA" acronym should not be confused with the Continental Wrestling Association, a local "outlaw" group which had broken away NWA Big Time Wrestling in 1980, which had its first-ever show advertised on Superstars of Wrestling.) was an internationally syndicated Canadian professional wrestling television program. Based in Windsor, Ontario, the show ran live events in Eastern Canada and the Great Lakes region of the United States from 1975 to 1984.

The show was created by George "Crybaby" Cannon after the close of Eddie Einhorn's International Wrestling Association, which had attempted to become the first-ever national wrestling promotion. Cannon, who served as the IWA's booker, brought in many of its former stars during the show's early years. The group also used wrestlers from NWA Big Time Wrestling in Detroit throughout the 1970s.

Superstars reached the height of its popularity following their 1977 debut in Montreal. French Canadian fans had not seen televised wrestling since the close of All-Star Wrestling and Grand Prix Wrestling the previous year. For much of the 1970s and early 1980s, Cannon was seen as the face of pro wrestling in the city. Superstars eventually began working with Promotions Varoussac and later produced the English-language version of its flagship programs "Les Étoiles de la Lutte" (The Stars of Wrestling) and "Lutte Internationale" (International Wrestling).

While Cannon possessed a strong TV syndication network throughout Canada and parts of the Midwestern United States, Superstars of Wrestling had difficulty securing talent and promoting house shows. The situation worsened following the close of Detroit's Big Time Wrestling in 1980 and Cannon was forced to scale back its production values and roster. In 1983, in an effort to counter Ole Anderson's planned "invasion" of Detroit, Cannon made a deal with World Wrestling Federation promoter Vince McMahon to co-promote shows in the area. Cannon's partnership with McMahon played a key role in securing the Detroit and Canadian markets as part of the WWF's national expansion during the 1980s. In less than two years, however, the WWF ended its partnership with Cannon. The show would subsequently be replaced by WWF Superstars of Wrestling.

== Show history ==
=== Background ===
In 1970, George "Crybaby" Cannon returned to his native Canada following a two-year run as host of a variety show on KTLA (Channel 5) in Los Angeles, California. He spent the next decade as a wrestling manager, most notably representing The Fabulous Kangaroos (Al Costello and Don Kent) in the NWA's Detroit territory. Cannon also began working under The Sheik and eventually became a key figure behind the scenes in Big Time Wrestling. In late 1974, a group of The Sheik's top mid-card wrestlers led by Karl Von Shotz and Jack Cain left BTW to form their own promotion, "Universal Wrestling", running shows in Ohio and Canada. Cannon briefly hosted a weekly television series for them which was a precursor to Superstars of Wrestling. It was while working with Universal Wrestling that Cannon became friends with Milt Avruskin. Avruskin, who was a ring announcer at that time, was brought on as a co-host. The Canadian television tapings were held at the University of Windsor and the American tapings were at the Tam O'Shanter Arena in Toledo, Ohio. The Universal Wrestling show managed to replace The Sheik's "Big Time Wrestling" show on WDHO-TV. The station received so many complains from fans, however, that it began airing both shows as a compromise. The promotion lasted less than a year and closed the following summer.

In early 1975, Cannon began working for the International Wrestling Association. When the owners Eddie Einhorn and Pedro Martinez decided to expand nationally, Cannon was hired as a booker and essentially promoted the Canadian end of the IWA. He also managed Eric The Red and the IWA Tag Team Champions The Mongols (Geeto Mongol and Bolo Mongol). Cannon was voted Manager of the Year by Inside Wrestling at the end of the year. By 1976, however, the pro wrestling industry was in a serious recession. All-Star and Grand Prix Wrestling in Montreal, and the National Wrestling Federation out of the Buffalo-Cleveland area, all folded during this period. Cannon too found himself out of a job when Eddie Einhorn pulled out of the IWA that same year. Despite the poor economic climate, Cannon decided to use the experience he had gained as a booker and promoter to strike out on his own.

=== Early history ===
In May 1975, Cannon began promoting events under the "Superstars of Wrestling" banner in Newfoundland, Canada. The main attraction was a feud between Sailor White and Karl Von Shotz as well as Billy Two Rivers battling Kurt Von Hess. Other wrestlers who took part in the original tour included Mike Vachon, Bad News Jackson, Louis Laurence and Silent MacKey. The region was still a "virgin territory" at this time and considered a risky venture by other wrestling promoters. These early shows were so popular, however, that Newfoundland and Labrador became a regular stopover for Superstars up until its final year in operation. Cannon's decision to promote Newfoundland locals Sailor White and Hartford Love as the top stars were a big part of what made these summer tours so successful.

Cannon chose his adopted city of Windsor, Ontario as the base of his operations. Superstars of Wrestling made its premiere later that year with Cannon providing color commentary and Avruskin as the play-by-play announcer. Avruskin played an integral role in the show's creation successfully pitching the show to the Global Television Network as a replacement for their Universal Wrestling program. As the IWA's last booker, Cannon was also able to retain many of the promotion's Canadian television contracts. Superstars of Wrestling was initially produced at the Toronto studios of Global TV, then a small regional network of stations in Southern Ontario, in Don Mills. With Avruskin's assistance, Cannon gradually continued to build a powerful syndication network over the next few years that would see the show air throughout Canada and parts of the U.S. by the end of the decade.

=== Style and pioneering innovations ===
Superstars was unique from other wrestling programs of the era. It was primarily a studio show but also aired matches from live events held in Newfoundland and Ontario. Because it filmed in different locations viewers never knew who would be showing up each week. Among those who made unannounced appearances included Chief Jay Strongbow, Johnny Valiant, Killer Kowalski, Mad Dog Vachon, Spiros Arion and Waldo Von Erich. The Kelly Twins (Mike Kelly and Pat Kelly), who were working for rival Maple Leaf Wrestling at the time, wrestled on Superstars as the masked tag team The Patriots. The Destroyer and Hossein the Great also appeared on Superstars and Maple Leaf television. The show also provided opportunities to several future stars. Riki Choshu, then wrestling under his real name Mitsu Yoshida, made his first appearance in North America on the Superstars of Wrestling program. Ten years before his pro debut, a 22-year-old Diamond Dallas Page made a cameo on the show in 1978. Al Snow and Bruiser Bedlam also wrestled on Superstars during their rookie year. While fans enjoyed the show's unpredictability, the downside was that Superstars was unable to build long-term storylines or feuds. Only a fraction of wrestlers from Cannon's live events appeared on Superstars and the lack of continuity was often a disadvantage when promoting house shows.

Superstars also incorporated 1970s rock music into the program. "The Ox" by The Who was used as the show's theme song. Superstars mainstay "Crazy" Chris Colt used Alice Cooper's "Welcome to My Nightmare" as his entrance music. This is one of the earliest instances of a promotion playing theme music for wrestlers.

=== Notable talent ===
The show featured a number of wrestlers who were regulars in the Detroit-Windsor and Montreal territories. When the IWA began recruiting wrestlers, rival NWA promoters threatened to blackball anyone who worked for the new promotion. After its close, a number of former stars found a home on Superstars including Cannon's former charges Eric the Red and The Mongols. On one of the early episodes of Superstars, the team defended the IWA Tag Team Championship against Dino Bravo and Luis Martinez. Using Sailor White as the main "heel" performer, the show also boasted names such as Buddy Austin, Bull Curry, Crusher Cortez, Don Kent, Hartford Love, Mighty Igor, Johnny War Eagle, Bob Della Serra, Tony Parisi and Otto Von Heller. Percival A. Friend from NWA Central States made a number of appearances on the show as well.

Cannon was successful in creating a few "homegrown" stars for the show. Superstars was the birthplace of manager "Supermouth" Dave Drason who had previously appeared in "Universal Wrestling". He was the top manager on Superstars in the mid-1970s. Drason was the manager of the mysterious El Santos, a pair of masked wrestlers originally portrayed by Duncan McTavish and Terry Yorkson, who were a popular tag team during the show's early history. Later on, Superstars featured midget wrestlers such as Cowboy Lang, Farmer Pete and Little John. Chief Lone Eagle, who would briefly hold the NWA World Midget's Championship in the early 1980s, got his start working for Cannon's group.

A notable feature of the show was George Cannon himself, who quickly emerged as an entertaining on-air personality for his deadpan humor and one-liners.

His likeable personality and skill at improvisation was responsible for some of the show's most memorable moments. One popular segment was the "Iron Stomach" challenge in which Cannon invited members of the studio audience to take turns punching him in the stomach as hard as they could. These participants ranged from teenage boys to adult men who "would invariably pound George in the stomach and grimace or shake their hands in pain". While being punched, Cannon would occasionally perform a humorous monologue (e.g. reading from the works of Shakespeare) or, describing the action in a mock play-by-play voice, playfully taunting the participants by asking "Is that the best you can do?".

=== Rivalry with Maple Leaf Wrestling ===
Cannon's main competitor was longtime Toronto promoter Frank Tunney who operated Maple Leaf Wrestling. As members of the National Wrestling Alliance, the Tunney family had ruled the territory since the 1940s. The Tunneys were usually indifferent to potential rivals as long as these "outlaw" promoters did not try to hold events in areas under their control such as Toronto. When "The Bearman" Dave McKigney tried running a show at Varsity Arena in September 1971, Tunney immediately scheduled a show at Maple Leaf Gardens on the same night. Over 15,000 people showed up at the Gardens while McKigney's show drew only 700 fans. McKigney's headliner, Tony Parisi, no-showed the event and began working for Tunney the following week. Five years later, encouraged by the strong attendance at the Superstars TV tapings, Cannon planned to hold their first major supercard at the CNE Coliseum which was to feature Lou Thesz in the main event. To help promote the show, the 60-year-old former NWA World Heavyweight Champion wrestled an exhibition match on Superstars and served as a special guest announcer.

Avruskin had originally applied to the Ontario Athletic Commission to hold the Coliseum show on June 30, 1976, but was told that date had been reserved by Maple Leaf Wrestling to celebrate Tunney's 40th year promoting wrestling. Instead, the OAC set aside June 6 exclusively for their company. When Tunney got word that the Superstars group was running a show in his city, he informed the commission that Maple Leaf Wrestling was moving its show to run on the same day. The OAC sent a formal request to Tunney asking him to change the date of his show but the promoter refused to reschedule because he had already placed advertisements in the newspapers. The case was taken all the way to the Canadian Supreme Court who supported Cannon and Avruskin, and stated "it would be injurious to the sport of wrestling and to the interest of the fans if competing matches were held on the same date in Toronto." Though the court had ruled in their favor, the application by Superstars to stop Tunney from holding his June 6 card was dismissed. This led Avruskin to protest, "Market surveys indicate that Toronto is the third most popular wrestling center in North America. We, like Frank Tunney have a class 1 license and we intend to run shows in Toronto and other Ontario centers. We won't be able to use The Coliseum all the time but we have other area arenas in mind".

The Maple Leaf-Superstars dispute was picked up by the local media. According to Toronto Star reporter Jim Proudfoot, Tunney spent a large amount of money to bring in top stars from other NWA territories, including former NWA World Champions Harley Race and Gene Kiniski, "to ward off this invasion of territory he's come to regard as his own". Cannon's show saw Lou Thesz defeating Crusher Cortez in the main event. Two matches on the undercard included The McGuire Twins versus The Executioners (Executioner #1 & Executioner #2) and Eric the Red facing Tony Parisi. Tunney's main event was a tag team match between Mark Lewin and Gene Kiniski against The Sheik and Ox Baker in a steel cage. The co-main event was The Crusaders (Billy Red Lyons and Dewey Robertson) defending the NWA International Tag Team Championship against Rip Hawk and Swede Hanson. History would repeat itself as approximately 7,000 attended Tunney's anniversary show while only 600 fans showed up for Cannon's event. On paper this appeared to be a crushing defeat for Superstars but Tunney's decision to go head-to-head with Cannon had damaged his promotion as well. While the Maple Leaf show had hurt their attendance, Superstars still drew a strong crowd for their first-ever supercard. Tunney had called in favors from fellow NWA promoters, and spent a considerable amount of money, for a half-filled show at the Gardens.

Yes, I was working for Cannon from the start and managed Eric the Red against Tony Parisi and also Hartford Love & Bruce Swayze against Don Serrano & Gino Brito at the CNE show. I beg to differ that the show was a disaster. It was a great show from top to bottom but our attendance was hampered by Tunney running a show on the fly that same evening. We had a good house for that show, being our first, which could have been better if not for the 2 shows the same evening. I don't recall who was on the MLG card but it didn't do blockbuster either. In the end, nobody came out the winner per se but the Cannon show was solid. [...] Of course the Tunneys hated the fact that anyone, including Cannon and Bearman, came into their backyard. I don't have results in front of me but I can't think of one guy who worked for us ever went back to work on a Tunney show. There was major animosity towards us, and one day when my paths crossed with the Tunneys, I was like the plague in their eyes. In no way did they try to help me in my managing career so it didn't bother me in the least to work for George who made me his top manager at a time when I was trying to make a name for myself early in my career. Oh well, life goes on in this crazy business called professional wrestling.

— Dave Drason, Questions for Supermouth, KayfabeMemories.com (2017)

Cannon stayed away from Toronto after the CNE Coliseum debacle knowing that Tunney would simply book the Gardens on the same day of a Superstars show. According to Drason, Toronto fans were very loyal to Maple Leaf Wrestling and reluctant to try a new product regardless of the show's quality or talent being used. Despite the setback, Superstars continued to enjoy high ratings in Ontario and Cannon's group remained a strong rival into the early 1980s.

A strained relationship also existed between Cannon and The Sheik during these early years. Cannon, who had worked for The Sheik in Big Time Wrestling, had sided with the Universal Wrestling faction two years earlier. His former employer was booking for Maple Leaf Wrestling at this time and appeared in the main event for Tunney's June 6 show. Cannon later bought commercial time during the Sheik's TV shows to promote Superstars and other rival shows. By the late 1970s, however, Cannon was using many of Big Time's wrestlers on Superstars of Wrestling including occasional appearances by The Sheik himself.

=== Height in popularity ===
The five-year war between All-Star Wrestling and Grand Prix Wrestling, which ended with the close of both promotions, had exhausted French-Canadian wrestling fans and it was very difficult to run live events in Montreal. By the end of 1976, the only televised wrestling available to fans were repeats of All-Star's "Superstars of the Mat" program on CFCF-12, and no French language wrestling being aired at all.

A native of Montreal, Cannon was eager to bring Superstars of Wrestling to his home province. In the spring of 1977, the show made its debut on CFCF-12 and was an instant hit with local audiences. The first few episodes that aired in Montreal featured Bull Curry, Luis Martinez, Pretty Boy Anthony and Chris Colt. While Superstars continued broadcasting from Windsor, its popular studio show was moved to the Montreal station shortly afterwards. In order to give Superstars a more Québécois feel, the show transitioned away from its Ontario/Michigan-based talent in favor of local Montreal wrestlers. In addition to Gino Brito as a top "babyface", Tarzan Tyler, a former IWA North American Heavyweight Champion, became one of the show's main "heels". He adopted a new look for Superstars abandoning his multi-colored trunks and growing out his bleached-blonde hair. Richard Charland was also featured as a young up-and-coming star after scoring an upset victory over Tyler. The veteran wrestler had bragged that he could defeat his young opponent with one hand tied behind his back. Charland promptly dropkicked the one-armed Tyler three times and scored a quick pinfall. Former Grand Prix play-by-play announcer Jack Curran also joined the broadcasting team for a short time.

Superstars saw two major departures after the move to Montreal. The first was Chris Colt who left after a falling out with Cannon. Cannon had wanted "Supermouth" Dave Drason to become Colt's manager, as both men had been using a similar "rock 'n roll" gimmick, but the wrestler refused to have a mouthpiece speak for him. This was one of the biggest disappointments in Drason's career as Colt had been one of his favorite wrestlers as a fan. Drason would depart soon afterwards when he interfered in a match at one of the early Superstars television tapings in Montreal. A wrestling manager did not need a license in Quebec, however, the local athletic commission ruled that Drason had become a wrestler the moment he entered the ring and banned him from working in the city. Drason was briefly replaced by Rene "Bob" Morgan, an ex-referee turned manager, who took control of the show's popular masked tag team El Santos (El Santos #1 & El Santos #2). Montreal was unique to the territory system in that, as Quebec was a bilingual province, it was necessary for managers to be fluent in both English and French languages. The French Canadian manager had difficulty speaking English, however, which became an issue as time went on since Superstars did not air on a French-language station. Morgan was eventually dispatched by Mad Dog Vachon who, in a surprise appearance, stopped the manager from using his cane to help one of his wrestlers and broke it over his head.

The show experienced its most creative phase while at the CFCF studios "where mostly forgotten classic TV bouts involving Otto Von Heller, Domenic DeNucci, Gino Brito, Waldo Von Erich, El Santos and many others thrilled fans throughout the province". Cannon's popularity soared during this era and he eventually came to be regarded as the face on pro wrestling in Montreal during the 1970s. His fame as a television star extended to appearing in commercials for "Dorion Suits", a popular clothing store chain in Quebec during the 1970s and 80s. But despite his celebrity status, Cannon had difficulty promoting live events in the city. In the aftermath of the All-Star/Grand Prix war, a number of people had attempted to run shows in the area. These fly-by-night shows often saw wrestlers being cheated out of payoffs and repeated false advertising drove off the remaining hardcore audience. When legitimate promoters tried to establish companies later on, local wrestling fans were reluctant to return to the arenas. Two of these organizations, Paul-Emile Desmarais' Super Catch promotion and Jack Britton's Olympia Pro Sports, tried to utilize Superstars of Wrestling without success. Cannon too tried promoting shows at Verdun Auditorium but gave up on the city entirely by 1979.

=== Troubles in the 1980s ===
In the years leading up to the 1980s professional wrestling boom, the show began to experience signs of decline. While Superstars of Wrestling was seen throughout Canada, it was increasingly difficult for the show to acquire talent on a consistent basis. This was a common problem among many "outlaw" promotions who were not members of the National Wrestling Alliance. Cannon had managed to get around this through his close association with The Sheik who controlled the NWA's Detroit territory. The close of NWA Big Time Wrestling in 1980 came as a serious blow for Superstars of Wrestling. By this time, Cannon's rival Frank Tunney had partnered with fellow NWA promoter Jim Crockett and Mid-Atlantic Championship Wrestling to ensure Maple Leaf Wrestling remained a strong competitor. That same year, Frank Valois, André the Giant and Gino Brito formed a new promotion in Montreal, Promotions Varoussac, further reducing the talent pool of available wrestlers.

Because the show would lose its television contracts if Cannon failed to provide enough hours of content, he was forced to run the show on a shoestring budget during this period. Superstars left the CFCF studio for a smaller facility and the Québécois atmosphere that had been so carefully crafted over the years all but disappeared. This ended up hurting the show's ratings in Quebec as well as attendance at the local house shows which had never been strong to begin with. Consequently, Superstars had significantly reduced production values and a very thin roster whose main stars included The Great Wojo, Mohammed Saad, Bobby Colt and Chris Carter. In another cost-cutting measure, Cannon had several people perform as the masked wrestler "El Santos", a character originally created early in the show's history, so that they could wrestle twice in one night. Duncan McTavish and Terry Yorkston, the original El Santos tag team, and Rocky Della Serra were among the wrestlers who took on the persona.

To make things worse, Superstars began facing serious competition from the World Wrestling Federation for the first time as WWF Championship Wrestling began airing in Montreal via WEZF, a border television station based in Burlington, Vermont. The ABC affiliate on Channel 22 had secured a spot on two cable systems serving the Montreal area and its programming was now widely available throughout the city. Although it aired at 11:15 pm Saturday nights, Cannon's audience were attracted to the WWF's superior production values as well as the popular feud between of the Bruno Sammartino and Larry Zbyszko.

Superstars countered with a feud between Cannon and Haystacks Calhoun. This led to one of the show's most noteworthy moments, the "Big Splash Competition", in which Calhoun challenged Cannon to see who had the best "big splash" finisher. Calhoun won this encounter (with interference by wrestler "Iron Mike" Miholak), and afterwards he hit Cannon several times with a horseshoe he kept as a good luck charm. The 1980 tour of Newfoundland featured Cannon battling Calhoun in a chain match at the Memorial Stadium and George "The Animal" Steele's short-lived reign as Canadian Heavyweight Champion. The following year, Cannon was able to bring in a handful of American stars for one-time appearances on Superstars including The Alaskan, Dick the Bruiser, Swede Hanson and Greg "The Hammer" Valentine. It also marked the last appearances of Superstars mainstays Luis Martinez, Don Kent and Hartford Love. Former wrestler Jim Lancaster claimed the growing influence of Dr. Jerry Graham Jr. on the show created problems between Cannon and the Superstars talent. There were also issues involving delayed payments and Cannon's demand that the wrestlers sign contracts that would prevent them from working for other promoters without his approval.

=== Cross-promotion with Promotions Varoussac ===
Cannon was able to establish a working relationship with the Montreal-based Promotions Varoussac. The new company had just launched a weekly show, "Les Étoiles de la Lutte" (The Stars of Wrestling), which was airing on All-Star's old Sunday morning time slot on CHLT in Sherbrooke, Quebec. Knowing that a talent exchange agreement would benefit Cannon's promotion, Gino Brito reached out to his old mentor in the hopes of gaining an English-language timeslot for the show. The partnership was a natural fit since Varoussac was able to provide the show with a steady stream of talent and Superstars could give the promotion valuable television exposure both in Montreal, particularly via the much sought after English language TV outlet on CFCF-DT, as well as outside of French-speaking Quebec.

Beginning in the spring of 1981, Superstars of Wrestling began featuring Varoussac wrestlers on the program as well as footage from their live events. In February, former NWA World Champion Édouard Carpentier made a special appearance to wrestle local wrestler Andre Moreau in an exhibition match. Carpentier was semi-retired at this point and was then serving as a play-by-play announcer for Promotions Varoussac. Several French Canadian wrestlers who had been regulars on Superstars made their return including, most notably, Gino Brito and Dino Bravo, as well as the television debuts of Mad Dog Lefebvre, Raymond Rougeau and Michel "Justice" Dubois among others. The show also incorporated their storylines into the program. A feud between Varoussac stars Gino Brito and The Destroyer began on a May 1981 episode of Superstars following an on-air confrontation over who had the superior figure-four leglock.

In 1982, Cannon and Milt Avruskin began producing an English-language version of Varoussac's flagship program "Les Étoiles de la Lutte" (The Stars of Wrestling). While the on-air commentary was in English, it was sometimes necessary for Cannon to be on location to explain what was happening to English-speaking wrestling fans. On a February 1983 episode, for example, the official contract signing between International Heavyweight Champion Billy Robinson (with Lord Alfred Hayes) and challenger Dino Bravo for their upcoming title bout at the Paul-Sauve Centre was conducted in French. As a bilingual speaker, Cannon was able to translate on the fly and describe other details such as the special stipulations for the bout. The English version of the show was renamed "International Wrestling" after Promotions Varoussac became Lutte Internationale the following year. Avruskin later joined Lutte as an announcer for "International Wrestling".

Had the timing of this arrangement been different, it might have provided a golden opportunity for International Wrestling to expand into the formerly lucrative Detroit area, with Cannon eventually becoming the booker there. Remember, this all transpired at a time when the sacred boundaries of the old territory system were now being openly violated and the WWF had begun its first great expansion. Soon, word leaked out that Ole Anderson's "Georgia Championship Wrestling" group was planning to bypass Cannon and invade the Detroit area. In those days, such an act meant war and George wasn't about to go down without a fight. Although it would have been preferential for him to partner up with Valois, the three-year-old Montreal promotion just wasn't financially prepared for such an endeavor. But Vince McMahon was.

— Daren Gleason, George Cannon: Keeping the Dream Alive, KayfabeMemories.com (2002)

=== Partnership with the World Wrestling Federation ===
In late-1983, Cannon was contacted by World Wrestling Federation promoter Vince McMahon about the possibility of both companies working together. As in Montreal, Cannon was struggling to promote live events in the Detroit territory. The local wrestling fans had similarly lost interest in the product largely due to The Sheik being "on top" for so many years. Cannon had run joint shows at Cobo Hall with Promotions Varoussac and the U.S.-based World Wrestling Association. Even longtime rival Frank Tunney was involved at one point, and was able to use Jim Crockett's wrestlers at the Cobo but, despite his efforts, Cannon failed to resurrect the territory to its former glory.

Hearing reports that Ole Anderson was planning to invade Detroit with his Georgia Championship Wrestling group, Cannon knew he would need help to hold onto the city. Promotions Varoussac, which was still trying to establish itself in Montreal, had only been in business for a little over two years and not yet strong enough to support Superstars against an incursion by the NWA. Cannon decided the next best thing was to ally himself with McMahon. After an initial meeting in New York City, Cannon agreed to become the WWF's local promoter in Detroit with a cut of the profits that would earn him upwards of $60,000 a year. Cannon and McMahon signed a three-way deal with a third going to Titan Sports, another third to Cannon, and the remaining third to the Olympia Stadium Corporation which oversaw Detroit's two biggest venues, Cobo Hall and the Joe Louis Arena. Avruskin spent a year with the WWF as a consultant, working to get WWF programming on Canadian television stations, before joining Lutte Internationale as the head announcer for its English-language program "International Wrestling".

As part of the deal with McMahon, Cannon agreed to turn over the production rights to the Superstars show. McMahon envisioned a WWF-produced version of the Superstars program which would be used to introduce his product to local audiences when expanding into new markets. The production values of WWF programming were much more sophisticated compared to those of Cannon and other promotions and McMahon believed the show would make a powerful impression on the average wrestling fan. McMahon's purchase of Superstars gave the WWF access to a very large syndication network that included several major cities in Canada as well as a few areas in the United States. The acquisition of CFCF's English-language outlet was a key factor in the WWF's successful takeover of the Montreal territory from Lutte Internationale several years later.

Cannon promoted the WWF's debut show in Detroit on December 30, 1983, which was attended by over 2,000 people. The main event saw Andre the Giant, Jimmy Snuka and Rocky Johnson defeat The Wild Samoans (Afa, Sika and Samula) in a Best 2-out-of-3 Falls match. On the undercard were two of Cannon's stars, The Great Wojo and Chris Carter, who faced Bob Bradley and Chief Jay Strongbow respectively.

=== Cancellation and aftermath ===
At first, Cannon's deal with McMahon appeared to bear fruit. He had successfully prevented Ole Anderson from running Detroit and the crowds starting coming back with the influx of WWF talent. In his role as the WWF's Detroit promoter, Cannon was able to fill out cards with some of the wrestlers from the Superstars show. The WWF had formed partnerships with many longtime NWA promoters throughout Canada and the United States. In exchange for their cooperation, they would be allowed to promote events exclusively for the WWF. In reality, however, these deals were made as a means to gain entry into NWA territories unopposed. Once the WWF had an established presence, local promoters were no longer needed as the company could run its operations directly from Titan Towers in Stamford, Connecticut. In Canada, it was necessary to keep a few old-time promoters around due to Canadian content laws. The Tunney family in Ontario and Gino Brito in Quebec would serve in these figurehead roles after they were put out of business by McMahon.

In 1985, barely two years after partnering with the WWF, Cannon became seriously ill with phlebitis and McMahon "seized the opportunity to squeeze him out of the picture". In April 1986, Cannon sold his stake in the Detroit partnership. He filed a $500,000 lawsuit against McMahon on March 24, 1987, only a few days before WrestleMania III which was being held at the Pontiac Silverdome in suburban Detroit. The case was dismissed with prejudice by the U.S. District Court on May 26, 1988. Cannon bitterly regretted the WWF deal in later years. He remained involved in the local independent scene and continued promoting small shows in Ontario until his death in 1992.

A version of Superstars of Wrestling continued to air in Montreal via "International Wrestling", Lutte Internationale's English-language program originally produced by George Cannon and Milt Avruskin. The show was hosted by Avruskin with Gino Brito doing color commentary. Although McMahon had purchased the CFCF-12 timeslot, Avruskin was able to get back on the station and directly competed against the WWF show until Lutte's close. The WWF version of Superstars initially began as a weekly recap show hosted by Vince McMahon, Gene Okerlund and Lord Alfred Hayes. A new revamped version of the show debuted in September 1986 and became the flagship program of the WWF's syndicated programming. WWF Superstars declined in importance during the Monday Night Wars of the 1990s. It was eventually merged with WWF LiveWire to create WWF Excess for the TNN network in 2001.

== Lawsuit and legal status ==
Following the end of the Cannon-McMahon partnership, the series was replaced by WWF Superstars of Wrestling. Cannon later sued McMahon over the right to use the "Superstars of Wrestling" name. On September 19, 1986, Cannon applied for a U.S. federal trademark on the "Superstars of Wrestling" term on behalf of Contact Sports. Titan Sports applied for the same trademark on November 14, 1986, and abandoned it on September 11, 1987. A similar lawsuit was filed by Chicago-based "outlaw" promoter Al "King Kong" Patterson whose promotion was also registered under the trademark "WWA Superstars of Wrestling". A court ruled in favor of Patterson and, starting with the April 18, 1992 episode, McMahon was forced to change the title of the show from WWF Superstars of Wrestling to simply WWF Superstars. Patterson has been the registered owner of the "Superstars of Wrestling" trademark since October 1994. As of 2019, the WWE Network still blurs the Superstars of Wrestling banner on old footage.

As is with the case of many pro wrestling series from the "Golden Age of Wrestling" (1950s-1970s), very little footage exists from Superstars of Wrestling. Only five full episodes are known to exist (Note: Two episodes from February 1983 and one each from April 1983 and June 1983. Another episode that aired in November 1983 is a rerun from the previous year.) and numerous fragments in the form of select matches and interviews. The show's legal status of has long been in question. Sports journalist Dave Meltzer suggested the rights probably belong to the Cannon family but this has never been confirmed. According to Dave Drasen, the tapes from the early Toronto TV tapings and many from Montreal still exist. The physical copies are held by Johnny Powers who has offered them for sale to anyone willing to pay to have them transferred from their 2-inch and 1 inch tape formats. It is one of the few tape libraries not owned by World Wrestling Entertainment.

== Broadcast ==
Superstars of Wrestling was syndicated throughout Canada for the majority of its eight-year run. The show's home station was originally on Windsor's CBET and later moved to CFCF in Montreal. It was also carried by CITY-TV in Toronto, CITV in Edmonton, and CKVU in Vancouver. In the United States, the show aired in Detroit via CBET Windsor and in a few smaller markets. Avruskin was able to license the show to an all-sports station in California at one point. The Windsor station's signal was powerful enough that fans in other parts of the Midwestern United States could watch the show with a strong enough antenna. This gave Cannon the benefit of holding house shows in areas where the promotion did not air on local stations. In Toledo, Ohio, for example, Superstars was able run shows at Waite High School and the Toledo Sports Arena.

In the early 1980s, Superstars of Wrestling competed against several other Saturday afternoon shows: Maple Leaf Wrestling (Toronto), NWA All-Star Wrestling (Vancouver) and NWA Mid-Atlantic Championship Wrestling (Southern United States) as well as WWF Championship Wrestling which aired on a midnight timelot.

Broadcast history

Channel	Location	Timeslot	Time frame	Notes
Canada
CITY-TV	Toronto, Ontario	Saturday 2-3 p.m. ET	1975 – 1984	
CBET	Windsor, Ontario/Detroit, Michigan	Saturday 1–2 p.m. ET	1975 – 1984	
CFCF	Montreal, Quebec	Saturday 1–2 p.m. ET	1977 – 1984	
CKVU	Vancouver, British Columbia	Saturday 1:30-2:30 p.m. PT	1979 – 1984	
CITV	Edmonton, Alberta			
MCTV-CTV ( now CTV Northern Ontario) System	Northeastern, Ontario and Abitibi-Témiscamingue, Quebec	1:00 P.M. ET	1979-1984	
N/A	Halifax, Nova Scotia			
CJON	St. John's, Newfoundland			
United States
WNDS	Boston, MA			

== Production ==
Superstars of Wrestling usually aired on an early afternoon timeslot each week on Saturdays and was approximately 45–48 minutes in length (produced for a 60-minute time-slot) per episode. The show was originally produced at the Toronto studios of the Global Television Network, then a small regional network of stations in Southern Ontario, from 1975 to 1977. Following its expansion into Quebec in early-1977, the show moved to CFCF-12 in Montreal where it remained until 1980. Some shows were also recorded in 1981–1982 at the University of Windsor, where students received an opportunity to produce several episodes, and the City TV studios in Toronto. The final season in 1983-84 was shot at CHLT-TV studios in Sherbrooke, Quebec. The show enjoyed strong ratings throughout its eight years on the air. Near the end of its run in 1983, Cannon had produced over 100 hours of original content.

Superstars of Wrestling was generally presented as a studio show although it often aired matches from high school gyms and small arenas in Newfoundland, Ontario and Quebec, as well as in the Great Lakes region of the United States. Although the studio show was filmed in Windsor, Cannon did not run live events in the city. A number of shows were held at Memorial Stadium in St. John's, Newfoundland and, briefly, the Verdun Auditorium in Montreal, Quebec during the 1970s. Some venues for the U.S. events included Waite High School and the Sports Arena in Toledo, Ohio and Cobo Hall in Detroit, Michigan.

=== Episode format ===
Hello, I'm George Cannon and I'm welcoming all of you to another hour of Superstars of Wrestling where you'll see the very best in the sport of professional wrestling. Now let's go to the ring where all the action and excitement is taking place.

— George Cannon

Each episode opened with a monochrome sequence of the Superstars of Wrestling roster competing in various matches, (Note: Footage of matches from the IWA were used for the show's original opening.) along with the show's theme song and brief introduction by George Cannon, before going directly to the opening match. An episode typically featured three to four matches as well as a number of backstage and post-match interviews. Special guests were sometimes invited to the show as color commentators such as Lou Thesz in 1976. The show typically ended after the main event (the final match on an episode) or an interview promoting an upcoming bout. The show's end credits were similar to the opening credits and had Cannon inviting viewers to tune in the following week.

In order to hype the arrival of a popular star, the show would sometimes show their matches from other NWA territories. When The Sheik was preparing to make his Superstars debut in 1980, the show aired his classic brawls against Bobo Brazil (1975) and Charlie Cook (1976) from NWA Big Time Wrestling, and Mark Roberts (1979) from NWA Mid-America. Similarly, Dick the Bruiser's 1979 bout against Paul Christy in World Wrestling Association was broadcast prior to his television debut in April 1981.

By the early-1980s, the show began airing content from Promotions Varoussac. In February 1983, for example, Superstars of Wrestling broadcast the official contract signing between Dino Bravo and Billy Robinson (with manager Lord Alfred Hayes) for their bout at the Paul-Sauve Centre for the Canadian International Heavyweight Championship. As the conversation was conducted in French, Cannon was on hand to explain the special stipulations for English-speaking fans. The show eventually began producing the English-language version of its flagship show "Les Étoiles de la Lutte" (The Stars of Wrestling) and "Lutte Internationale" (International Wrestling).

=== Memorable episodes ===
Episode	Date	Rating	Notes
Superstars of Wrestling Debut	1975	N/A	The first ever Superstars of Wrestling episode.
The Mongols IWA World Tag Team Title defence	1975	N/A	The Mongols (Geeto Mongol and Bolo Mongol) defend the IWA World Tag Team Championship against Dino Bravo and Luis Martinez.
Lou Thesz Appearance	1976	N/A	Former NWA World Champion Lou Thesz, at age 60, wrestles an exhibition match against Mike Marconi. Also makes a special appearance as a guest color commentator.
Superstars of Wrestling (Montreal Debut)	1977	N/A	Premiere on CFCF-12. It is the first pro wrestling tv series to air in Quebec since the close of All-Star Wrestling.
Harley Race NWA World Heavyweight Title defence	1977	N/A	Harley Race defends the NWA World Heavyweight Championship against Jumbo Tsuruta in All-Japan Pro Wrestling. This was possibly the earliest footage of Japanese wrestling to air on American and Canadian television.
Luis Martinez CWA Canadian Heavyweight Title defence	1980	N/A	Luis Martinez defends the CWA Canadian Heavyweight Championship against Don Kent.
Nelson Royal NWA World Junior Heavyweight Title defence	1980	N/A	Black Diamond unsuccessfully challenged Nelson Royal for the NWA World Junior Heavyweight Championship.
Nelson Royal NWA World Junior Heavyweight Title defence	1980	N/A	Joe Marcus unsuccessfully challenged Nelson Royal for the NWA World Junior Heavyweight Championship.
The "Big Splash Competition"	1980	N/A	In a battle of the super heavyweights, George "Crybaby" Cannon is challenged by Haystacks Calhoun to see who has the better "big splash" finisher.
The Shiek Appearance	1980	N/A	In one of his first tv appearances after the close of NWA Big Time Wrestling, The Sheik (accompanied by Eddie Creatchman) makes his Superstars of Wrestling debut against Alec Girard. A wild post-match interview takes place at the announcers table.
Édouard Carpentier Appearance	February 1981	N/A	Former NWA World Champion Édouard Carpentier wrestles an exhibition match against Andre Moreau. Carpentier, then in semi-retirement, was a play-by-play announcer for Promotions Varoussac.
Brito vs. Dubois	April 1981	N/A	Features a match between Promotions Varoussac wrestlers Gino Brito and Michel "Justice" Dubois.
The Destroyer-Gino Brito Confrontation	May 1981	N/A	A feud begins between The Destroyer and Gino Brito following an on-air confrontation over who has the better figure-four leglock. The Destroyer offers to put up $1,000 for a match.
Billy Robinson-Dino Bravo Title Contract	February 1983	N/A	Official contract signing between International Heavyweight Champion Billy Robinson (with Lord Alfred Hayes) and challenger Dino Bravo for their upcoming March 7 title bout at the Paul-Sauve Centre.
WWF Debut in Detroit	December 30, 1983	N/A	The first joint Cannon-McMahon show featuring the WWF's debut in Detroit.
Superstars of Wrestling Finale	1984	N/A	Final episode of Superstars of Wrestling. The series continued as a WWF-only clip show until its replacement by WWF Superstars of Wrestling two years later.

== On-air personalities ==
=== Champions ===
==== Superstars of Wrestling Heavyweight Championship ====
Wrestler:	Defeated:	Date:	Place:	Event:	Notes:
Dino Bravo	N/A	1976	N/A	N/A	
Eric the Red	Dino Bravo	1982	N/A	N/A	

==== Superstars of Wrestling Junior Heavyweight Championship ====
Wrestler:	Defeated:	Date:	Place:	Event:	Notes:
Chris Carter	Mohammad Saad	1982	N/A	N/A	

==== Superstars of Wrestling Canadian Heavyweight Championship ====
Wrestler:	Defeated:	Date:	Place:	Event:	Notes:
Luis Martinez	N/A	1979	N/A	N/A	
Don Kent	Luis Martinez	1980	N/A	N/A	
Luis Martinez	Don Kent	June 24, 1980	St. John's, Newfoundland and Labrador	N/A	
George "The Animal" Steele	Bulldog Brower	July 8, 1980	St. John's, Newfoundland and Labrador	N/A	
Hartford Love	George Steele	July 22, 1980	St. John's, Newfoundland and Labrador	N/A	
Hans Muller	N/A	N/A	N/A	N/A	
Greg Wojokowski	Hans Muller	1982	N/A	N/A	

==== Superstars of Wrestling United States Heavyweight Championship ====
Wrestler:	Defeated:	Date:	Place:	Event:	Notes:
Bobo Brazil	Bulldog Brower	1982	N/A	N/A	

==== Superstars of Wrestling Tag Team Championship ====
Team:	Defeated:	Date:	Place:	Event:	Notes:
Bud Osbourne and Ray Osbourne	N/A	1976	N/A		

==== Superstars of Wrestling Canadian Tag Team Championship ====
Team:	Defeated:	Date:	Place:	Event:	Notes:
Louis Laurence and Jim Oliver	N/A	1979	N/A		
Hartford Love and Otto von Heller	Louis Laurence and Jim Oliver	1979	N/A		
Luis Martinez and George Cannon	Hartford Love and Otto von Heller	1979	N/A		The title is vacated when Martinez is defeated in a loser-leaves-town match.

==== Superstars of Wrestling United States Tag Team Championship ====
Team:	Defeated:	Date:	Place:	Event:	Notes:
Fred Curry and John Bonello	N/A	1983	N/A		

=== Commentators ===
Commentators	Dates
George Cannon and Milt Avruskin	1975–1982
George Cannon, Milt Avruskin and Lou Thesz	1976
George Cannon, Milt Avruskin and Jack Curran	1977
George Cannon, Milt Avruskin and Dr. Jerry Graham Jr.	1981
George Cannon and Dino Bravo	1982
George Cannon	1983-1984

=== Ring announcers ===
Ring Announcer	Dates
Milt Avruskin	1975-1976
Dave Singer	1977-1984

== Legacy ==
Although most remembered in the United States as a wrestling manager, Cannon is considered an important figure in Canadian professional wrestling. He, along with Jack Britton, are credited for keeping pro wrestling alive in Montreal during one of the worst periods in the industry. Superstars of Wrestling also pioneered a number of innovations (e.g. the use of entrance music for wrestlers) used by the WWF and other promotions years later. The years Cannon spent promoting in Montreal, Ontario and Detroit, and his television syndication efforts, paved the way for the WWF to expand into those markets during its national expansion during the 1980s wrestling boom. Cannon's cooperation allowed Vince McMahon to get into Detroit ahead of Ole Anderson in 1983 and his English-language timeslot on CFCF was instrumental in the WWF's successful takeover of the Montreal territory from Lutte Internationale several years later. These regions remain one of the company's most lucrative markets into the early 21st century.

John Powell, an entertainment journalist and co-founder of SLAM! Wrestling, was a fan of Superstars of Wrestling growing up. Canadian wrestling fans like himself relied on the show for their knowledge and news in the world of pro wrestling. Border City Wrestling, founded by wrestler Scott D'Amore in 1993, has been favorably compared to Superstars of Wrestling by The MediaPlex adding that the independent promotion has "[filled] a void left in Windsor's wrestling scene since the close of Cannon's promotion".

In 2008, students at the University of Windsor discovered a set of promotional photos for Superstars of Wrestling in the university archives. The show's TV tapings had taken place in a studio now occupied by the Noiseborder Multimedia Performance Lab. The students put on a special performance, titled "Superstars of Wrestling", as part of the Noiseborder experimental music program.

== See also ==
- Professional wrestling in Canada
- Maple Leaf Wrestling
- Stampede Wrestling
