= George Cannon (wrestler) =

Canadian professional wrestler and manager (1932-1994)

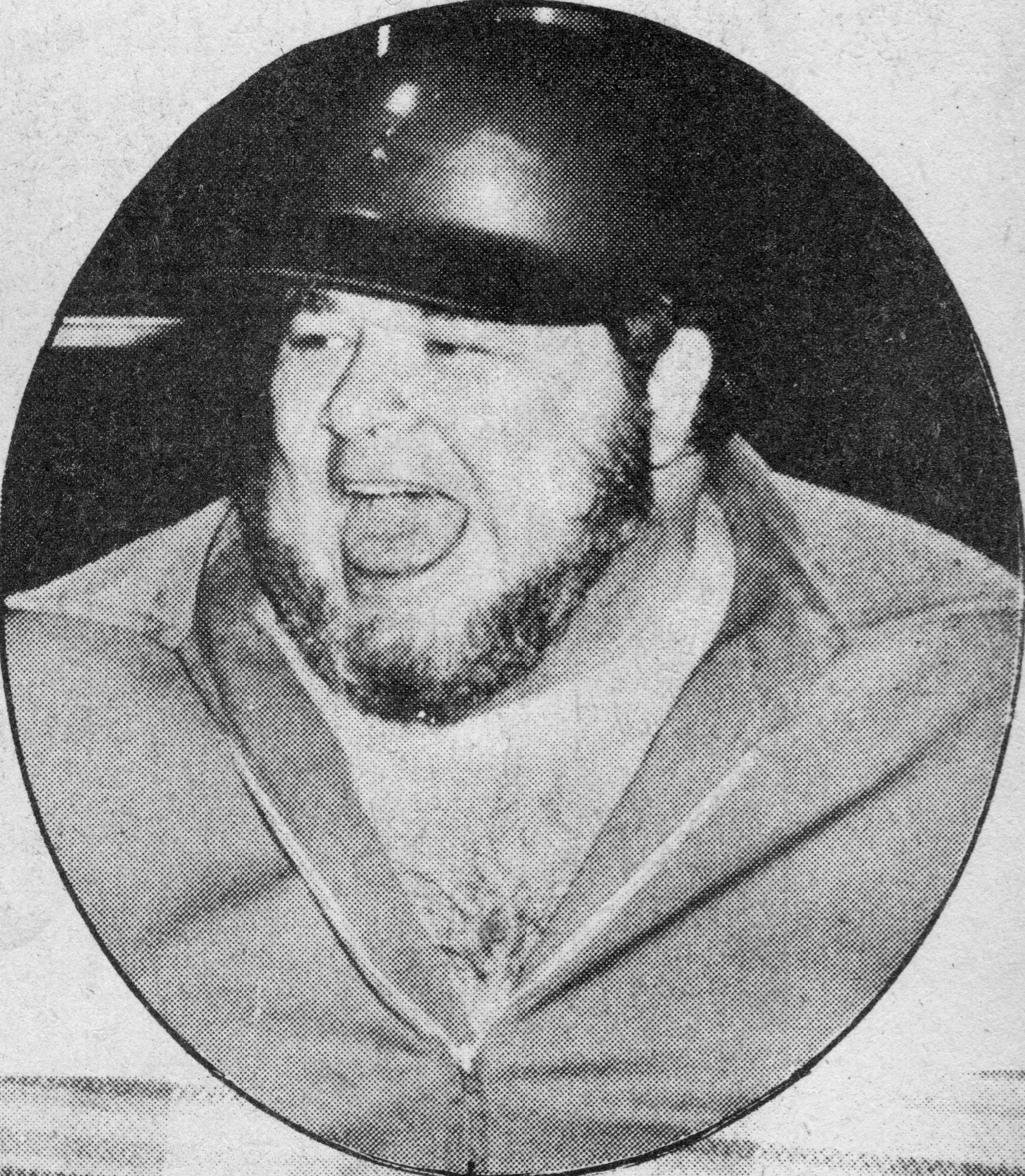

Personal information
- Born: George Arnold McCarther; March 28, 1932 Montreal, Quebec, Canada
- Died: July 1, 1994 (aged 62) Russell Woods, Ontario, Canada

Professional wrestling career
- Ring name(s): George Cannon; Man Mountain Cannon; George McCarther
- Billed weight: 299 lb (136 kg)
- Debut: 1953
- Retired: 1980

George Arnold McCarther (March 28, 1932 – July 1, 1994), better known as George "Crybaby" Cannon, was a Canadian professional wrestler and manager, best known as the manager of the Fabulous Kangaroos and the McGuire Twins.

== Professional wrestling career ==
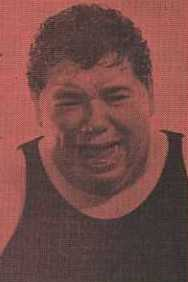
Cannon in May 1962

Growing up, Cannon was interested in hockey, baseball, football, boxing and lacrosse. He spent some time in the Canadian Football League with the Saskatchewan Roughriders. He began wrestling in Japan in 1953. He wrestled for a while in Canada beginning in 1955, left for a time, and returned for good in 1959. Cannon got the nickname "Crybaby" from his ability to wipe sweat from his face, making it look as though he were weeping. In 1968, Cannon won a tournament to win the NWA "Beat the Champ" Television Championship. Also that year, he wrestled in the World Wide Wrestling Federation as Crybaby Cannon in New York City and the Northeast where he fought against Gorilla Monsoon, Virgil the Kentucky Butcher, Toru Tanaka, and Baron Mikel Scicluna.

When he returned to Canada, he hosted a weekly variety show on KTLA-TV in Los Angeles from 1968 to 1970. This show featured guests being brought in to try to knock Cannon down with a punch to the stomach. Cannon got his big break when he became the manager of the Fabulous Kangaroos, predominantly for The Sheik's promotion in Detroit. As a manager, he often came to the ring wearing a battle helmet and a ring jacket emblazoned across the back in large capital letters with the phrase "I am right", with "cannon" above that. The team feuded with The Stomper and Ben Justice in a storyline in which the Kangaroos supposedly broke The Stomper's leg. The teams feuded for two years, during which The Stomper continually tried to get revenge by attacking Cannon.

Cannon worked for the American-based International Wrestling Association run by Eddie Einhorn in 1975. McCarther performed many duties, including wrestling, managing wrestlers (including The Mongols), and booking events. Cannon was also involved in several other areas of wrestling, including publishing magazines and hosting a wrestling television show taped in Windsor, Ontario called Superstars of Wrestling, which was nationally syndicated throughout Canada during the early 1980s. He later partnered with World Wrestling Federation owner Vince McMahon but later became unable to continue his duties due to phlebitis.

== Death ==
McCarther died of cancer on July 1, 1994, at the age of 62.

== Championship and accomplishments ==
- NWA Los Angeles
  - NWA "Beat the Champ" Television Championship (1 time)
  - NWA Americas Tag Team Championship (1 time) – (with Freddie Blassie)
- Pro Wrestling Illustrated
  - Manager of the Year (1975)

== See also ==
- List of professional wrestling promoters
