= Attorney General Curran =

Attorney General Curran may refer to:

- J. Joseph Curran Jr. (born 1931), Attorney General of Maryland
- Lancelot Curran (1899–1984), Attorney General for Northern Ireland
- William Curran (politician) (1885–1951), Attorney General of Maryland
