= Kevin Curran (cricketer) =

Zimbabwean cricketer

Personal information
- Full name: Kevin Malcolm Curran
- Born: 7 September 1959; Rusape, Southern Rhodesia
- Died: 10 October 2012 (aged 53); Mutare, Zimbabwe
- Nickname: KC
- Height: 6 ft 2 in (1.88 m)
- Batting: Right-handed
- Bowling: Right-arm fast medium
- Role: All-rounder
- Relatives: Kevin P Curran (father); Tom Curran (son); Ben Curran (son); Sam Curran (son)

International information
- National side: Zimbabwe (1983–1987)
- ODI debut (cap 2): 9 June 1983 v Australia
- Last ODI: 30 October 1987 v Australia

Domestic team information
- Years: Team
- 1985–1990: Gloucestershire
- 1988/89: Natal
- 1991–1999: Northamptonshire
- 1994/95–1997/98: Boland

Career statistics
Competition	ODI	FC	LA
Matches	11	324	407
Runs scored	287	15,740	9,194
Batting average	26.09	36.86	30.34
100s/50s	0/2	25/83	1/53
Top score	73	159	119*
Balls bowled	506	31,994	14,349
Wickets	9	605	364
Bowling average	44.22	27.65	29.25
5 wickets in innings	0	15	1
10 wickets in match	0	4	0
Best bowling	3/65	7/47	5/15
Catches/stumpings	1/–	209/–	105/–
- Source: CricInfo, 14 July 2015

Kevin Malcolm Curran (7 September 1959 – 10 October 2012) was a Zimbabwean international cricketer. He was part of Zimbabwe's first One Day International team following independence at the 1983 Cricket World Cup. He went on to be the head coach of the Zimbabwe national cricket team from August 2005 until September 2007.

Born in 1959 at Rusape in the Federation of Rhodesia and Nyasaland, he played in 324 first-class and 407 List A cricket matches. He also possessed an Irish passport as his paternal grandfather moved to Rhodesia in 1902.

== International career ==
Curran was first called into the Zimbabwe team as part of an unofficial tour of Sri Lanka in 1980. He made his One Day International (ODI) debut on 9 June 1983 against Australia, Zimbabwe's first ODI, at the 1983 Cricket World Cup. The match was a big upset as Australia were defeated by 13 runs, with Curran part of a crucial 70-run partnership for the sixth wicket with Duncan Fletcher. Later in the competition Curran showed his all-round abilities, taking three wickets and scoring his maiden ODI half-century against India.

The same year, he was part of Zimbabwe's tour of Sri Lanka. During Young Australia's tour of Zimbabwe in 1985, Australian batsman Dean Jones rated Curran as one of the fastest bowlers he had faced. Curran played his last international matches during the 1987 Cricket World Cup. He had limited opportunities to play at international level and, as Zimbabwe had not gained full-member status, he could not play Test cricket. By the time Zimbabwe received Test status, Curran had completed a 10-year qualification for English residency and opted to play county cricket.

== Domestic career ==
A genuine all-rounder, Curran was a right-arm medium-fast bowler and right-handed middle-order batsman. He was a regular in English county cricket for Gloucestershire and Northamptonshire County Cricket Clubs in the 1980s and 90s, and passed 1,000 runs in a season five times. Gloucestershire controversially declined to extend his contract at the end of the 1990 season and he moved to Northamptonshire, playing for the county until his retirement from professional cricket in 1999. In 1997, he became the captain of Northamptonshire succeeding Rob Bailey. He ended his county career on a with 13,755 runs and 510 wickets in 278 county matches, playing 139 for each of Northamptonshire and Gloucestershire. He scored 6,765 runs for Gloucestershire and 6,990 runs for Northants, taking 239 and 271 wickets respectively. He also played provincial cricket in South Africa for both Boland in 1988 and for Natal from 1993 to 1997.

Curran was highly regarded for his fitness levels and ran a gymnasium with Malcolm Jarvis in Harare. He also played golf, rugby union, tennis and squash.

== Coaching career ==
His first coaching job was as the assistant coach of the Zimbabwe national team in 2000, soon going on to take charge of the Namibian team. In September 2004, he became the director of coaching at the CFX Cricket Academy in Harare succeeding Geoff Marsh.

He was appointed as the head coach of the Zimbabwe national team in August 2005, replacing Phil Simmons, and served in the position until September 2007. He was sacked from the role following the team's disappointing performance at the 2007 Cricket World Cup and was replaced by Robin Brown. During his tenure the team lost 30 of its 40 ODI matches. He also coached the Zimbabwe national under-19 cricket team at the 2010 Under-19 Cricket World Cup and introduced changes in the way that players were selected for the under-19 team. He was appointed as team selector by Zimbabwe Cricket in 2011 and also coached Mashonaland Eagles. At the time of his death, he was still coaching Mashonaland and was head of the Zimbabwe Cricket Academy.

During his time coaching Zimbabwe a number of players were involved in disputes with Zimbabwe Cricket. When he was appointed as head coach, some players were unhappy and expressed their disappointment regarding the decision to snub Phil Simmons and the later introduction of controversial new contracts led to frustration and tension between Curran and his players. Under his tenure, Zimbabwe temporarily withdrew from playing Test cricket in 2006 due to the standoff between the players and the cricket board.

Towards the end of his period as head coach of the national team, he received criticism for suggesting employing specialist coaches prior to the 2007 ICC World Twenty20.

== Family ==
The Surrey and England cricketers Tom Curran and Sam Curran and Zimbabwe batter Ben Curran are his sons.

Both Sam and Tom have played for the England cricket team. His father, also called Kevin, played first-class cricket for Rhodesia in the 1940s and 1950s.

Under the land ownership reforms introduced by the government of Robert Mugabe, the Currans' family farm was seized and the land redistributed to black ownership in 2004.

== Death ==
Curran collapsed while jogging in Mutare and died on 10 October 2012, aged 53. His cause of death remained unknown for some time. Former Northamptonshire teammate Allan Lamb paid tributes to him and referred to his untimely death as an "absolute body blow".
