= Joe Curran =

Joe Curran may refer to:

- Pat Curran (footballer, born 1917) a.k.a. Joe Curran
- Joe Curran, protagonist in Joe (1970 film)
- Joe Curran (ice hockey), plays in Atlantic Coast Hockey League

== See also ==
- Joseph Curran (disambiguation)
