= William Curran =

William Curran may refer to:

- William Curran (umpire) (died 1921), cricket Test match umpire.
- William Curran (politician) (1885–1951), Attorney General of Maryland
- William Curran (American football) (born 1959), American football wide receiver
- William Hughes Curran (1893–1940), American film director
- William J. Curran (1925–1996), American health lawyer
- Billy Curran, New Zealand rugby league player
