= Senator Curran =

Senator Curran may refer to:

- Chuck Curran (born 1939), Ohio State Senate
- Henry M. Curran (1918–1993), New York State Senate
- J. Joseph Curran Jr. (born 1931), Maryland State Senate
- John Curran (Illinois politician) (fl. 2010s), Illinois State Senate
- William Curran (politician) (1885–1951), Maryland State Senate
