= Frank Curran =

Frank Curran may refer to:

- Frank Curran (politician) (1912–1992), American politician
- Frank Curran (English footballer) (1917–1998), footballer for Tranmere Rovers
- Frank Curran (rugby league) (1910–1985), Australian rugby league footballer
- Frank Curran (Australian rules footballer) (1919–1999), Australian rules footballer
