= Sean Curran =

Sean Curran or Seán Curran may refer to:

- Seán Curran (dancer), American dancer and choreographer
- Seán Curran (hurler) (born 1991), Irish hurler
- Sean Curran (scientist), American gerontologist
- Sean Curran (politician) (born 1977), American politician in Massachusetts
- Sean M. Curran, American law enforcement officer
