= Kevin Curran (cricketer, born 1928) =

Rhodesian cricketer (1928–2017)

Personal information
- Full name: Kevin Patrick Curran
- Born: 31 August 1928; Kadoma, Rhodesia
- Died: 23 August 2017 (aged 88); Harare, Zimbabwe
- Batting: Right-handed
- Bowling: Right-arm medium
- Relatives: Kevin M Curran (son); Tom Curran (grandson); Sam Curran (grandson); Ben Curran (grandson)

Domestic team information
- Years: Team
- 1947/48–1954/55: Rhodesia

Career statistics
Competition	First-class
Matches	7
Runs scored	234
Batting average	23.4
100s/50s	0/1
Top score	52*
Catches/stumpings	5/–
- Source: Cricinfo, 10 July 2019

Kevin Patrick Curran (31 August 1928 – 23 August 2017) was a Rhodesian cricketer. He played seven first-class cricket matches for Rhodesia between 1947 and 1955. His son, Kevin, played One Day Internationals (ODIs) for the Zimbabwe national cricket team, two of his grandsons, Tom and Sam, have played international cricket for England, and his third grandson Ben Curran plays for Zimbabwe
