= Robert Curran =

Robert Curran may refer to:

- Robert Curran (Canadian politician) (1883–1958), politician in Manitoba, Canada
- Robert Curran (dancer), Australian dancer and choreographer, artistic director of Louisville Ballet
- Robert Curran (physician) (1921–2006), British pathologist
- Robert Curran (Scottish politician) (1923–1995), Scottish nationalist activist
- Robert T. Curran (1921–1977), American college baseball and basketball player and coach
- Robert W. Curran (born 1950), Maryland politician

Robert Curran (narrator), A narrator for audiobooks.
