= Mairead Curran =

Australian actress (born 1968)

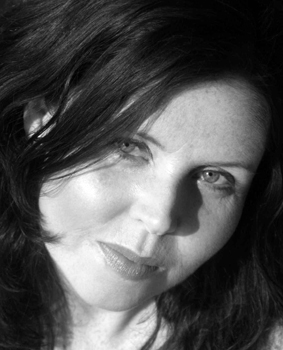
- Born: 16 August 1968; Geelong, Australia
- Occupation: Entertainer

Mairead Curran (born 16 August 1968) is an Australian born children's entertainer, actress, and voice-over artist based in Melbourne. Having trained at TAFTA and the Geelong Performing Arts Academy she started her career at the Oxford Children's Theatre and the Australian Puppet Theatre performing children's theatre and puppetry.

== Cartoon Creations ==
For ten years she worked with business partner Collin Ingram and through their company Cartoon Creations they produced dozens of live children's shows touring them throughout Australia and in the United Kingdom, performing shows for many thousands of children. Her contributions in this area make her an important part of the history of live children's entertainment in Australia.

During this period she also produced and starred in "The Digger and Danni Radio show" on Southern FM, a daily children's radio show and produced children's pages in several newspapers including the Moonee Ponds and Ascot Vale Community Newspapers.

== Stage work ==
On stage, Mairead has had roles in numerous plays for theatres such as La Mama Theatre (Melbourne) and in the Melbourne Fringe Festival including "Women, Men, Nazis and Trucks" and "Love and Madness in the LMP Unit" to strong reviews. She was also a founding member of Actors Inc, a group of working actors, convened to promote their work and practice their craft. In addition to various indie short films, Mairead has also had roles in Neighbours, Stingers, MDA, Blue Heelers and City Homicide.

== Voice-overs ==
In more recent years Mairead has focused on voice-overs, where she has carved out a successful career working with companies such as the ARN, Austereo and Jingle House as well as many corporate clients. She is the voice of numerous characters in games including the lead and four other female characters in Fashion Boutique and the female lead in The Clockwork Man by Total Eclipse She has also voiced many commercials both radio and TV for international brands including Mazda, Ferrero, Hyundai, Domino's Pizza, Sasse & Bide, Siemens, Target, Freedom Furniture and Toyota.
