= Thomas Curran (Illinois politician) =

American businessman and politician

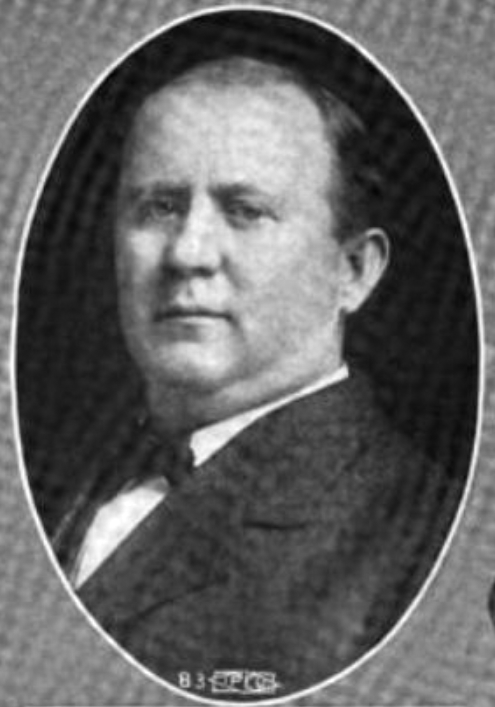

Member of the Illinois House of Representatives
- In office 1906 – November 12, 1928

Personal details
- Born: November 18, 1868 Chicago, Illinois
- Died: November 12, 1928 (aged 59) Kenosha County, Wisconsin
- Party: Republican
- Occupation: Businessman, politician

Thomas Curran (November 18, 1868 – November 12, 1928) was an American politician and businessman.

== Biography ==
Curran was born in Chicago, Illinois. He was a merchant. Curran also served as the superintendent of the Chicago West Park Board. Curran served in the Illinois House of Representatives from 1907 until his death in 1928. He was a Republican. Curran was killed in an automobile accident when the automobile hit a tree on Wisconsin Highway 41, five miles west from Kenosha, Wisconsin. Curran and his passengers were driving from Waukesha, Wisconsin to Chicago.
