= John Elliott Curran =

American lawyer and writer

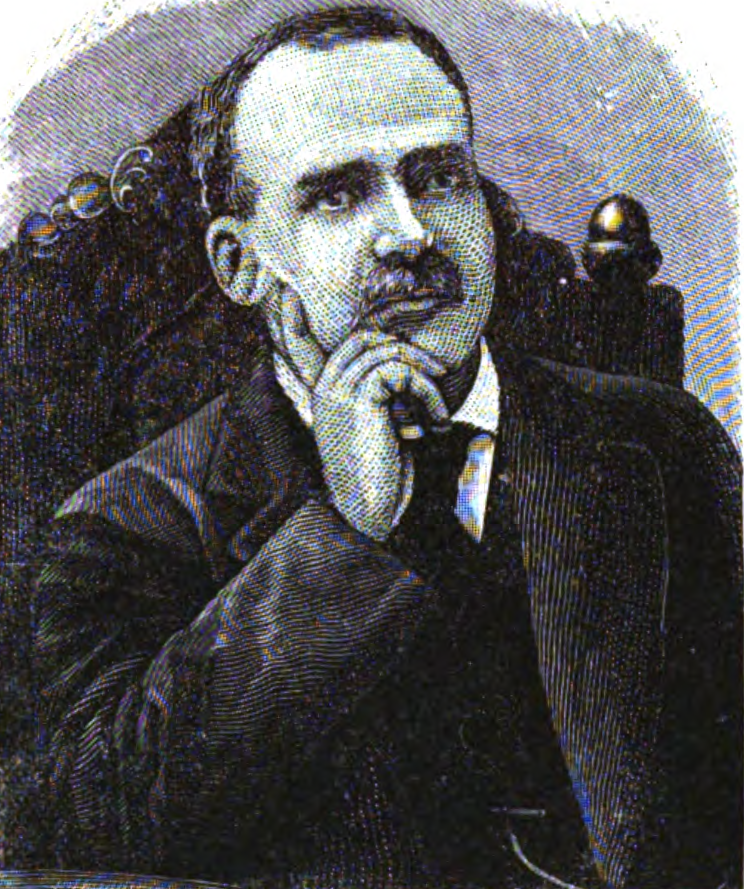
- Born: John Elliott Curran; May 25, 1848; Utica, New York, U.S.
- Died: May 18, 1890 (aged 41); Englewood, New Jersey, U.S.
- Education: Yale College, Columbia Law School
- Occupation: Writer
- Spouse: Eliza P. Mulford
- Writing career
- Period: 19th century
- Notable work: Miss Frances Merley

John Elliott Curran (May 25, 1848 – May 18, 1890) was an American lawyer and writer. He published a novel, Miss Frances Merley (1888).

== Early life and education ==
Curran, son of John C. and Mary L. Curran, was born in Utica, New York, May 25, 1848. He graduated from Yale College in 1870. After nearly a year of European travel he pursued the study of law, at first in Utica, and then in the Law School of Columbia College, where he was graduated in May 1873.

== Career ==
Curran practiced law for some years in New York City, but finally abandoned it for literary work, which had long interested him. He published one novel, Miss Frances Merley, in 1888, and a number of stories in magazines. He also did some newspaper work in New York, and was secretary of the New York Lumber Trade Journal.

== Publications ==
- Miss Frances Merley (1888, novel)
- "Polly Winslow" (1889, Harper's)
- "Joe Gilfillan" (1889, Harper's)

== Personal life ==
He married Eliza Phillips Mulford, of New York City, who survived him with their three children. Their residence was in Englewood, New Jersey, where he died on May 18, 1890, at the age of 41, of heart-failure, following a week's illness of pneumonia and pleurisy. His son Henry Hastings Curran was Manhattan borough president and a deputy to Mayor Fiorello La Guardia.
