= Hugh McCollum Curran =

Botanist (1875–1960)

- Born: November 16, 1875; Manhattan, New York, US
- Died: October 3, 1960 (aged 84); Frankfort, Indiana, US
- Scientific career
- Fields: Botany
- Author abbrev. (botany): H.M.Curran

Hugh McCollum Curran (1875–1960) was an American forester, who worked in the Philippines and South America.

== Biography ==
He graduated in 1898 with a B.S. from the North Carolina College of Agriculture and Mechanic Arts. From 1899 to 1900 he was a special student in the College of Forestry at Cornell University. From 1900 to 1905 he worked for the U.S. Forest Service. From 1906 to 1913 he was employed as a forester in the Philippines by the Bureau of Forestry based in Manila. In 1906 the authorized force of the Bureau consisted of one director, 10 clerical staff, and a field staff consisting of 13 foresters, 6 assistant foresters, 23 rangers, and a manager of the timber-testing laboratory. In 1912 he returned to the United States and married Marian Elma Hege (widow of Samuel Augustus Pfohl, who died in 1903). Their marriage occurred on 27 June 1912 in Forsyth County, North Carolina. Their first son, Hugh M. Curran Jr., was born in 1913 in Buenos Aires; their second son was born there in 1914; their daughter was born in Washington D.C. in 1917. Hugh M. Curran Sr. worked in Argentina and Brazil from 1913 to 1916. In 1915 he delivered a letter from Theodore Roosevelt to Lauro Müller. From 1916 to 1922 Hugh M. Curran Sr. was a lecturer on South American forests at Yale University. From 1929 until the end of 1941 he was a professor of tropical forestry at the Philippines Agricultural College in Los Baños, Laguna. Following the December 1941 Japanese invasion of the Philippines, Curran and his family hid in the forest but were eventually imprisoned at the Los Baños Internment Camp where they remained until 1945. Following World War II, Hugh M. Curran Sr. lived with his wife in Venezuela, where he worked as a forestry consultant. His wife died in Caracas in 1952, and Curran died in Indiana in 1960.

== Discoveries ==
Curran collected several new species of flowering plants in Brazil in 1915 and in Colombia in the early part of 1916. The botanical specimens were described and named by Sidney F. Blake and represent trees or shrubs of at least local economic significance.

== Eponyms ==
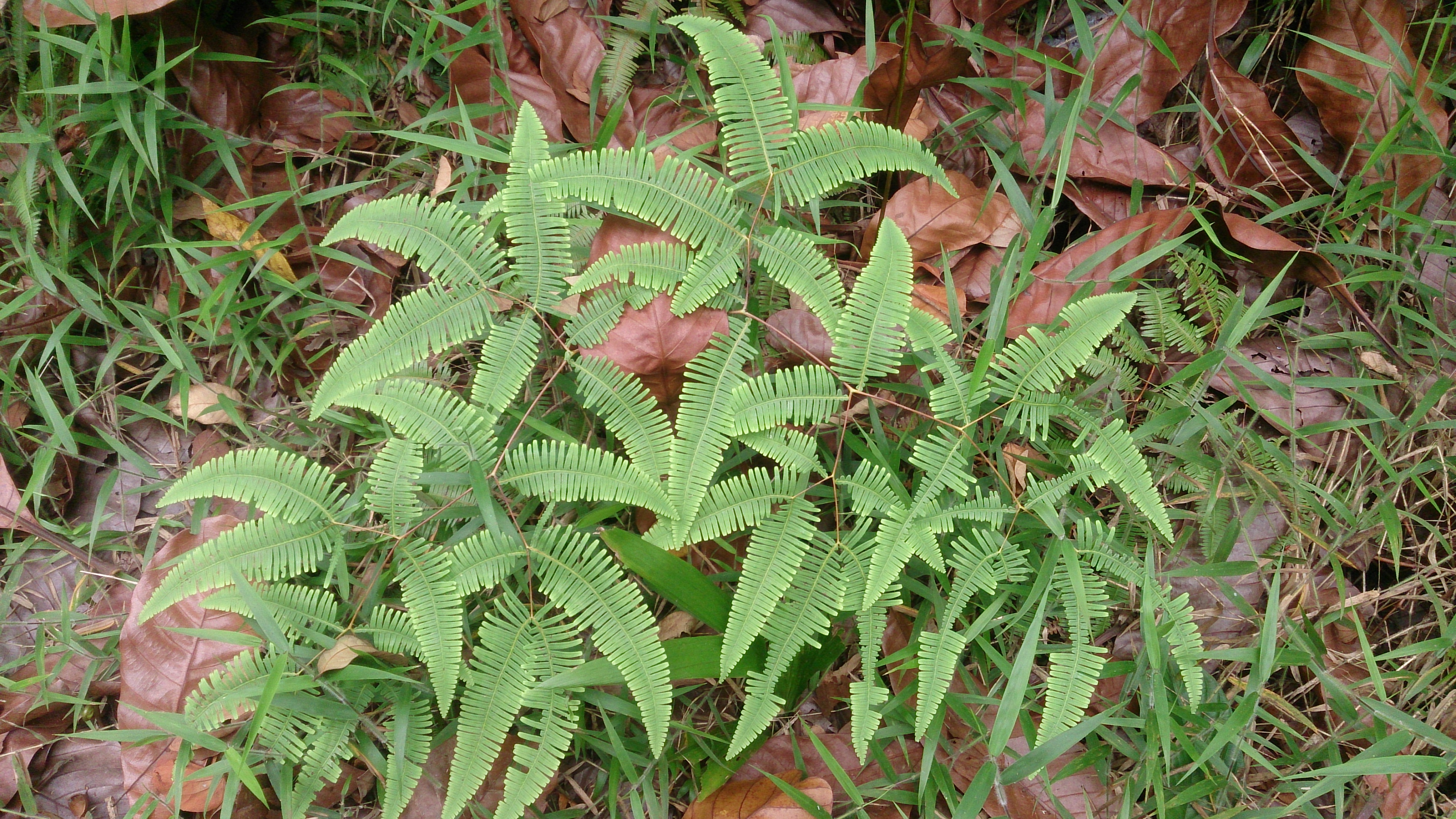
Roadside fern (D. curranii)

- Dicranopteris curranii (named by Edwin Bingham Copeland in honor of Hugh M. Curran Sr.)
