= Sam Curran =

English cricketer (born 1998)

Sam Curran MBE
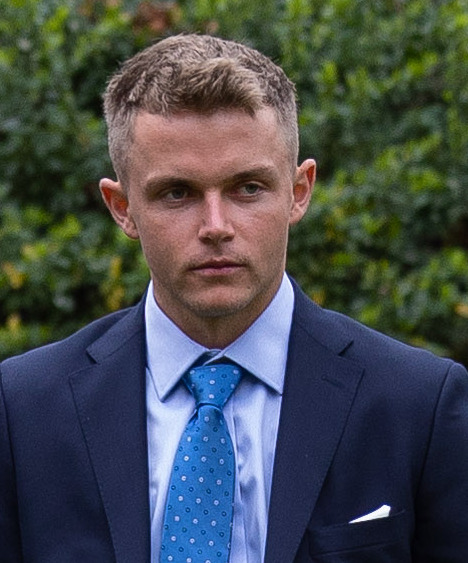
- Curran in 2023

Personal information
- Full name: Samuel Matthew Curran
- Born: 3 June 1998 (age 28); Northampton, Northamptonshire, England
- Height: 5 ft 9 in (175 cm)
- Batting: Left-handed
- Bowling: Left-arm medium-fast
- Role: All-rounder
- Relatives: Kevin P Curran (grandfather); Kevin M Curran (father); Tom Curran (brother); Ben Curran (brother)

International information
- National side: England (2018–present)
- Test debut (cap 686): 1 June 2018 v India
- Last Test: 25 August 2021 v India
- ODI debut (cap 250): 24 June 2018 v Australia
- Last ODI: 18 November 2026 v Australia
- ODI shirt no.: 58
- T20I debut (cap 87): 1 November 2019 v New Zealand
- Last T20I: 11 July 2026 v India
- T20I shirt no.: 58

Domestic team information
- Years: Team
- 2015–present: Surrey
- 2017/18: Auckland
- 2019, 2023–2024: Punjab Kings
- 2020–2021, 2025: Chennai Super Kings
- 2021–present: Oval Invincibles
- 2023–2024: MI Cape Town
- 2024–2025/26: Desert Vipers
- 2025/26: Sydney Sixers

Career statistics
Competition	Test	ODI	T20I	FC
Matches	24	51	80	88
Runs scored	815	791	744	3,607
Batting average	24.69	22.60	21.25	30.31
100s/50s	0/3	0/2	0/2	2/25
Top score	78	95*	58	126
Balls bowled	3,091	1,898	1,359	12,035
Wickets	47	49	73	221
Bowling average	35.51	40.83	26.91	29.94
5 wickets in innings	0	1	1	7
10 wickets in match	0	0	0	1
Best bowling	4/58	5/48	5/10	7/58
Catches/stumpings	5/–	17/–	31/–	28/–
Medal record
Men's cricket
Representing England
ICC T20 World Cup
Winner	2022 Australia
- Source: ESPNcricinfo, 18 November 2026

Samuel Matthew Curran MBE (born 3 June 1998) is an English cricketer who has played for England in all formats. In domestic cricket, he represents Surrey, and has played in multiple T20 leagues.

Curran made his Test and One Day International debuts in 2018, and his Twenty20 International debut in 2019. He was part of the England team that won the 2022 T20 World Cup, taking the most wickets for England at the tournament and was named Player of the Tournament. He plays as a left-handed all-rounder, bowling medium fast. He holds the English record for the best T20I bowling figures, 5–10 against Afghanistan in 2022. In the 2023 Cricket World Cup, Curran became the first English bowler to take a wicket off the first ball on World Cup debut.

== Early life and education ==
Sam Curran was born on 3 June 1998 in Northampton, England, as the third son of the former Zimbabwe international cricketer Kevin Curran and his wife Sarah (while his father played county cricket for Northamptonshire).

He is the youngest brother of a Surrey and England cricketer Tom Curran, and Zimbabwe batsman Ben Curran.

He grew up in Zimbabwe and was educated at Springvale House, Marondera and St. George's College, Harare.

He spent his early years on the family farm in Rusape before the family left the farm during a period of land reform in Zimbabwe. In 2012, he moved to England and was educated at Wellington College, Berkshire.

== Domestic and T20 career ==
Curran represented Surrey at Under-15, Under-17, and Second XI level. During the 2014 season he represented Weybridge in the Surrey Championship Premier Division. He was described by Surrey director of cricket Alec Stewart as "the best 17-year-old cricketer that I have seen".

Curran made his senior debut in a Twenty20 match in the NatWest t20 Blast tournament against Kent at The Oval on 19 June 2015, aged 17 years and 16 days. He made his first-class debut in a County Championship fixture against Kent at The Oval on 13 July 2015. At the age of 17 years and 40 days he became Surrey's second youngest first-class cricketer in history after Tony Lock, who debuted exactly 69 years earlier at the age of 17 years and 8 days, also against Kent at The Oval. He returned figures of 5/101 in the first innings, and is believed to be the youngest-ever player to take five wickets in a County Championship match. He made his List A debut in a Royal London One-Day Cup match against Northamptonshire at The Oval on Thursday 27 July 2015.

He was signed by Auckland Aces for the 2017–18 Super Smash.

In April 2022, he was bought by the Oval Invincibles for the 2022 season of The Hundred. In June 2022, Curran took his first five-wicket haul in Twenty20 cricket, with 5/30 against the Hampshire Hawks in the 2022 T20 Blast. Later the same month, in the County Championship match against Kent, Curran scored his maiden century in first-class cricket, with 126 runs. He reached his hundred off just 62 balls.

In 2026, Sam opened up on the groin injury that ruled him out of IPL 2026, admitting that the issue has been building up for a while before finally forcing a "tough desicion" to withdraw.

== Indian Premier League (IPL) ==
In December 2018, he was bought by the Kings XI Punjab in the player auction for the 2019 Indian Premier League for ₹7.2 crore (equivalent to ₹11 crore or £840,000 in 2026). In March 2019, he was named as one of eight players to watch by the International Cricket Council (ICC) ahead of the 2019 Indian Premier League tournament. In the 2019 Indian Premier League, he scored a quick 20 runs as opener and took a hat-trick in his second match, against Delhi Capitals which helped Kings XI Punjab to win by 14 runs, earning him the player of the match award. He also scored a quick fifty of just 23 balls against Kolkata Knight Riders in the 2019 Indian Premier League. He was released by the Kings XI Punjab ahead of the 2020 IPL auction. In the 2020 IPL auction, he was bought by the Chennai Super Kings ahead of the 2020 Indian Premier League. He was part of the CSK squad that won the 2021 IPL.

In November 2025, ahead of IPL 2026, Curran joined Rajasthan Royals after he and Ravindra Jadeja were traded to them from Chennai Super Kings in exchange for Sanju Samson. However, Curran had to withdraw from the tournament on 22 March 2026 because of a groin injury. The Royals signed Dasun Shanaka as his replacement.

== International career ==
Curran represented Zimbabwe Cricket U13s cricket team at the 2011–12 CSA U13 Week in South Africa, where he won the player of the tournament.

He represented England Under-19s at the 2016 ICC Under-19 Cricket World Cup, where he played all six games, scoring 201 runs and taking seven wickets to help his team finish sixth. He was selected for the England Lions for their 2016–17 tour of the United Arab Emirates, and again for their match against South Africa A at Canterbury in the 2017 season.

Curran received his first senior call-up for England in January 2018 for the 2017-18 Trans-Tasman Tri-Series against Australia and New Zealand, but did not play any games.

On 30 May 2018 he was added to the England Test squad ahead of the second Test against Pakistan, as cover for Ben Stokes. He made his Test debut at Headingley on 1 June 2018. Curran scored 20 in England's only innings, and returned match figures of 2/43.

On 24 June 2018, he made his One Day International debut against Australia.

Curran retained his place in the England squad for the Test series against India. In the first Test at Edgbaston he took 4/74 in the first innings, including the wickets of India's top three batsmen, and scored 63 in England's second innings, and was awarded Player of the Match. After being omitted from the England team for the third Test, he returned in place of the injured Chris Woakes at the Rose Bowl, where he top scored in England's first innings with 78. Curran registered his first Test duck in the fifth Test at The Oval, but was named England's Player of the Series against India, having contributed 272 runs and 11 wickets in England's 4–1 series victory. He was named Cricket Writers' Club Young Cricketer of the Year for his performances in the 2018 season.

Curran played two Tests during England's tour of Sri Lanka in November 2018, scoring 112 runs at an average of 37.33, but only took a single wicket. He played in the final Test of England's home series against Australia in September 2019, taking three wickets in Australia's first innings. Later that month he was named in England's Test and Twenty20 International (T20I) squads for their series against New Zealand. He made his T20I debut for England, against New Zealand, on 1 November 2019.

Curran played two Tests in the 2019 England tour of the West Indies, making 50 runs in four innings and taking one wicket at an average of 161. In the 2019 Test summer, Curran took 6 wickets at 16 and scored 87 runs at 21.8, in one Test against Ireland and the fifth Ashes Test.

After playing only two tests in the summer, Curran played all six Tests of the 2019–20 winter tours of New Zealand and South Africa. In the two New Zealand Tests, Curran took 6 wickets at an average of 39.7 and made 40 in three innings. In South Africa, Curran made 130 runs in 7 innings, and took 10 wickets at an average of 32.6, which included career best figures of 4/58 in the first Test.

On 29 May 2020, Curran was named in a 55-man group of players to begin training ahead of international fixtures starting in England following the COVID-19 pandemic. On 17 June 2020, Curran was included in England's 30-man squad to start training behind closed doors for the Test series against the West Indies. On 4 July 2020, Curran was named as one of the nine reserve players for the first Test match of the series.

In the 2020 England summer, Curran played in one Test against the West Indies and one against Pakistan, scoring 17 in his only innings and taking 4 wickets at an average of 36. Curran was included in the squad for England's 2021 tour of Sri Lanka.

Curran then played in all 5 T20I matches, and all 3 ODI matches as part of England's 2021 winter tour of India. On 28 March 2021, in the final ODI match of the tour, Curran was awarded Player of the Match for scoring 95* in England's attempted run chase of 329 set by India. England lost the match by 7 runs.

On 1 July 2021, in the second match against Sri Lanka, Curran took his first five-wicket haul in ODI cricket. On 16 August 2021 in the second test against India, Curran was the first batter to get a king pair at Lord's.

In September 2021, Curran was named in England's squad for the 2021 ICC Men's T20 World Cup. However, on 5 October 2021, Curran was ruled out of England's squad due to a back injury, with his brother, Tom, named as his replacement.

He was out of action for around seven months making his comeback in the County Championship for Surrey on 21 April 2022 against Somerset.

In May 2024, he was named in England's squad for the 2024 ICC Men's T20 World Cup tournament.

On 30 January 2026, during the first T20I of England's tour of Sri Lanka, Curran became only the second England bowler to take a hat-trick in Twenty20 International history, following Chris Jordan in 2024. Curran achieved the feat in the 16th over of the Sri Lankan innings, dismissing Dasun Shanaka, Maheesh Theekshana and Matheesha Pathirana.

=== 2022 T20 World Cup ===
In England's opening match against Afghanistan, Curran took a five-wicket haul (the first by an England player in T20Is), helping England win the match and earning him the Man of the Match award. In the Final against Pakistan he took 3/12 wickets in 4 overs and was again named Man of the Match. He was the second-highest wicket-taker in the tournament, taking 13 wickets with a bowling average of 11.38, and was named Player of the Tournament for his efforts.

Curran was appointed Member of the Order of the British Empire (MBE) in the 2023 Birthday Honours for services to cricket.
