= Charles Curran =

Charles Curran may refer to:

- Charles Curran (television executive) (1921–1980), BBC Director-General 1969–1977
- Charles Curran (politician) (1903–1972), British Conservative politician, MP for Uxbridge 1959–1966
- Charles Curran (theologian) (born 1934), American Catholic moral theologian
- Charles Arthur Curran (1913–1978), American psychologist and Jesuit priest
- Charles Courtney Curran (1861–1942), American painter
- Charles Howard Curran (1894–1972), Canadian entomologist
- Chuck Curran (born 1939), American Republican politician in Ohio
