= Frank Curran (Australian rules footballer) =

Australian rules footballer, born 1919

Personal information
- Full name: Francis Edward Curran
- Born: 15 October 1920; Parramatta, New South Wales
- Died: 14 July 1999 (aged 78)
- Original team: Hawthorn Rovers
- Height: 175 cm (5 ft 9 in)
- Weight: 70 kg (154 lb)

Playing career^{1}
Years	Club	Games (Goals)
1942	Hawthorn	1 (0)
- ^{1} Playing statistics correct to the end of 1942.

Francis Edward Curran (15 October 1920 – 14 July 1999) was an Australian rules footballer who played with Hawthorn in the Victorian Football League (VFL).

He played a single game for Hawthorn while serving in the Australian Army Reserve in World War II.
