= Judge Curran =

Judge Curran may refer to:

- Barbara A. Curran (1940–2022), judge of the New Jersey Superior Court
- Edward Matthew Curran (1903–1988), judge of the United States District Court for the District of Columbia
- Hugh Curran (politician) (1924–2006), judge of the Connecticut Superior Court
- Lancelot Curran (1899–1984), judge of the High Court of Northern Ireland
- Thomas John Curran (1924–2012), judge of the United States District Court for the Eastern District of Wisconsin
