= Joseph Curran (disambiguation) =

Joseph Curran (1906–1981), American trade unionist.

Joseph Curran may also refer to:

- Joseph Curran (basketball) (1922–2012), American basketball player
- J. Joseph Curran Jr. (born 1931), American politician in Maryland

== See also ==
- Joe Curran (disambiguation)
