= Shane Curran =

Shane Curran may refer to:

- Shane Curran (entrepreneur), Irish businessman
- Shane Curran (footballer) (born 1971), Irish footballer
