= Ben Curran =

Zimbabwean cricketer (born 1996)

Personal information
- Full name: Benjamin Jack Curran
- Born: 7 June 1996 (age 30); Northampton, Northamptonshire, England
- Batting: Left-handed
- Bowling: Right-arm off break
- Role: Batter
- Relatives: Kevin P. Curran (grandfather); Kevin M. Curran (father); Tom Curran (brother); Sam Curran (brother)

International information
- National side: Zimbabwe (2024–present)
- Test debut (cap 130): 26 December 2024 v Afghanistan
- Last Test: 28 June 2026 v Bangladesh
- ODI debut (cap 159): 17 December 2024 v Afghanistan
- Last ODI: 15 September 2026 v Australia
- T20I debut (cap 81): 23 July 2026 v India
- Last T20I: 6 September 2026 v South Africa

Domestic team information
- Years: Team
- 2018–2022: Northamptonshire
- 2020/21–2022/23: Southern Rocks
- 2023: Norfolk
- 2023/24–present: Mid West Rhinos

Career statistics
Competition	Test	ODI	T20I	FC
Matches	9	12	8	64
Runs scored	537	471	102	3781
Batting average	33.56	47.10	12.75	38.58
100s/50s	1/1	2/2	0/0	8/15
Top score	121	118*	38	147
Balls bowled	–	–	–	386
Wickets	–	–	–	4
Bowling average	–	–	–	56.25
5 wickets in innings	–	–	–	0
10 wickets in match	–	–	–	0
Best bowling	–	–	–	2/7
Catches/stumpings	9/–	3/–	5/–	51/–
- Source: ESPNcricinfo, 16 September 2026

Benjamin Jack Curran (born 7 June 1996) is a Zimbabwean international cricketer. He made his international debut for Zimbabwe on 17 December 2024.

Curran is a left-handed batsman who is the second son of former Zimbabwean international cricketer Kevin M. Curran, and the brother of England internationals Tom and Sam Curran. He has previously represented the MCC Young Cricketers, Northamptonshire and the Nottinghamshire Second XI.

Curran made his Twenty20 debut for Northamptonshire against Derbyshire on 8 August 2018. He signed with Northamptonshire for the remainder of the 2018 season on 15 August 2018, and made his first-class debut against Durham on 29 August 2018. He made his List A debut on 26 April 2019, for Northamptonshire in the 2019 Royal London One-Day Cup. He was released following the 2022 season.

Curran was selected to play for the Southern Rocks in the 20/21 and the 21/22 Logan Cup in Zimbabwe, where he grew up.

He was called-up to the Zimbabwe squad for their home One Day International series against Afghanistan in December 2024. Curran made his ODI debut on 17 December 2024, making 15 before the match was abandoned due to rain. He was selected in the Zimbabwe squad for the subsequent series against Afghanistan and made his debut on 26 December 2024, scoring 68 off 74 balls in his first innings in the format.

Curran made his maiden One Day International century against Ireland at the Harare Sports Club on 18 February 2025, scoring 118 not out off 130 balls including 14 boundaries to help his team to a nine-wicket win.
