= John Curran (news correspondent) =

American journalist (1957-2011)

John Curran (1957 – September 17, 2011) was an American journalist and news correspondent. Curran was a journalist at the Associated Press from 1989 until his death.

John Curran was named Vermont news leader for the Associated Press in 2006 after reporting for 12 years in Atlantic City, N.J.

John Curran was the son of longtime Buffalo News columnist Bob Curran. He graduated from St. Bonaventure University in Olean, N.Y., with a degree in journalism. He worked for the Niagara Gazette and joined the Associated Press in Charleston in 1989, and transferred to Boston in 1993.

In 1994 he was sent to Atlantic City to cover crime, politics, the Miss America pageant and Donald Trump's casinos.

Curran was born in New York City and grew up near Buffalo. In 1975, he graduated from high school in Amherst, N.Y. and went to the United States Military Academy Preparatory School at Fort Monmouth, N.J. Though he had intended to play college basketball at West Point, he changed plans and served as an enlisted man after being injured in a motorcycle accident. He began his career as a journalist writing for Army newspapers.

Curran died on September 17, 2011, when he was stricken apparently with a heart attack while mowing the lawn at his home in Montpelier, VT. He was 54.
