= Paul Curran =

Paul Curran may refer to:

- Paul Curran (cyclist) (born 1961), British racing cyclist
- Paul Curran (director) (born 1965), Scottish opera director and administrator
- Paul Curran (association footballer) (born 1966), Northern Irish football manager and former player
- Paul Curran (Gaelic footballer), Irish Gaelic footballer who played for Dublin
- Sir Paul Curran (geographer) (born 1955), president of City, University of London
- Paul Curran (hurler) (born 1981), Irish hurling fullback
- Paul J. Curran (1933–2008), New York politician and corruption fighter
