= Margaret Curran (disambiguation) =

Margaret Curran (born 1958) is a Labour politician.

Margaret or Peggy Curran may also refer to:

- Margaret Curran (poet) 1887–1962), Australian poet
- Margaret E. Curran, United States Attorney for Rhode Island (from 1998 to 2003)
- Margaret Curran, Alaskan diphtheria patient, see 1925 serum run to Nome#Second relay
- Peggy Curran, former writer for Montreal Gazette
