= Zimbabwean cricket team in Sri Lanka in 1983–84 =

The Zimbabwean national cricket team toured Sri Lanka in December 1983 and played two first-class matches and three Limited Overs Internationals (LOI) against the Sri Lankan national cricket team. At this time, Sri Lanka had just achieved Test status but Zimbabwe had not. Sri Lanka were captained by Ranjan Madugalle and Zimbabwe by John Traicos. The Zimbabwe team played two first-class matches versus the Sri Lanka Board President's XI at Tyronne Fernando Stadium and a Sri Lankan XI at Paikiasothy Saravanamuttu Stadium. Both games were drawn. Zimbabwe also played three limited overs matches against the Sri Lankan XI.
