= Tom Curran (cricketer) =

English cricketer (born 1995)

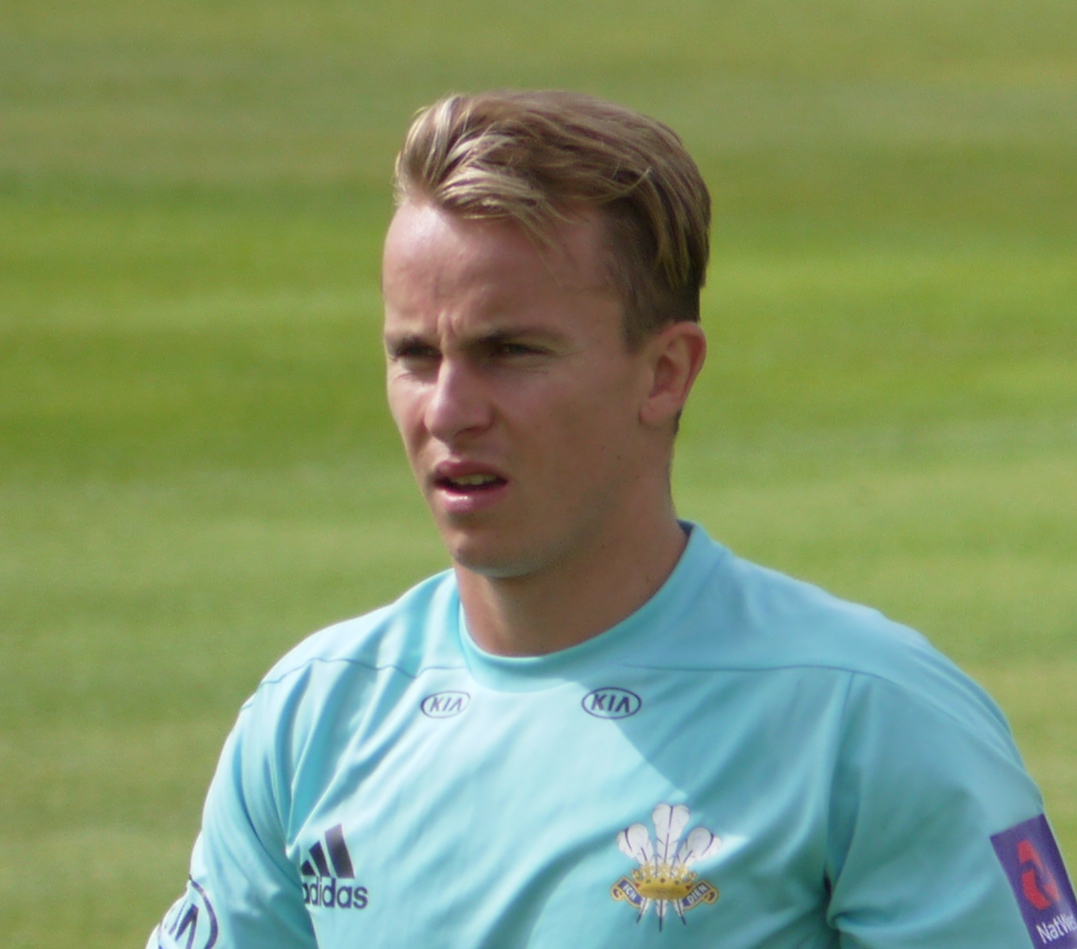
- Curran in 2017

Personal information
- Full name: Thomas Kevin Curran
- Born: 12 March 1995 (age 31); Cape Town, Western Cape, South Africa
- Height: 6 ft 0 in (1.83 m)
- Batting: Right-handed
- Bowling: Right-arm fast-medium
- Role: All-rounder
- Relatives: Kevin P Curran (grandfather); Kevin M Curran (father); Sam Curran (brother); Ben Curran (brother)

International information
- National side: England (2017–2021)
- Test debut (cap 682): 26 December 2017 v Australia
- Last Test: 4 January 2018 v Australia
- ODI debut (cap 248): 29 September 2017 v West Indies
- Last ODI: 4 July 2021 v Sri Lanka
- ODI shirt no.: 59
- T20I debut (cap 79): 23 June 2017 v South Africa
- Last T20I: 18 July 2021 v Pakistan
- T20I shirt no.: 59

Domestic team information
- Years: Team
- 2013–present: Surrey
- 2018: Kolkata Knight Riders
- 2018/19–2023/24: Sydney Sixers
- 2020: Rajasthan Royals
- 2021: Delhi Capitals
- 2021–present: Oval Invincibles
- 2023: Islamabad United
- 2024/25–2025/26: Melbourne Stars
- 2025: Gulf Giants
- 2025: Lahore Qalandars
- 2026: Quetta Gladiators
- 2026: Edinburgh Castle Rockers

Career statistics
Competition	Test	ODI	FC	LA
Matches	2	28	65	86
Runs scored	66	303	1,525	739
Batting average	33.00	37.87	19.30	21.11
100s/50s	0/0	0/0	1/6	0/0
Top score	39	47*	115	47*
Balls bowled	396	1,308	10,917	3,909
Wickets	2	34	199	126
Bowling average	100.00	37.94	29.66	28.83
5 wickets in innings	0	1	7	3
10 wickets in match	0	0	1	0
Best bowling	1/65	5/35	7/20	5/16
Catches/stumpings	0/–	5/—	25/–	26/–
Medal record
Men's Cricket
Representing England
ICC Cricket World Cup
Winner	2019 England and Wales
- Source: ESPNcricinfo, 17 July 2026

Thomas Kevin Curran (born 12 March 1995), is an English cricketer who represents England in Test matches, One Day Internationals and Twenty20 Internationals. He plays for Surrey County Cricket Club in English domestic cricket. He is a right-arm fast-medium bowling all-rounder . He made his international debut for England in June 2017. He is the son of former Zimbabwe international cricketer Kevin Curran, and the brother of both Zimbabwe batsman Ben Curran and England and Surrey all-rounder Sam Curran.

Curran won the Cricket Writers' Club Young Cricketer of the Year award for his performances in 2015. He was part of the England squad that won the 2019 Cricket World Cup, though he did not play in any matches during the tournament.

== Early life and education ==
Born in Cape Town, where his father played for Boland, Curran grew up in Zimbabwe and attended Springvale House, a preparatory school in Zimbabwe before moving on to the prestigious St George's College in Harare. His excellence at cricket allowed him to move onto Hilton College and finally Wellington College in England.

== Domestic and T20 cricket ==
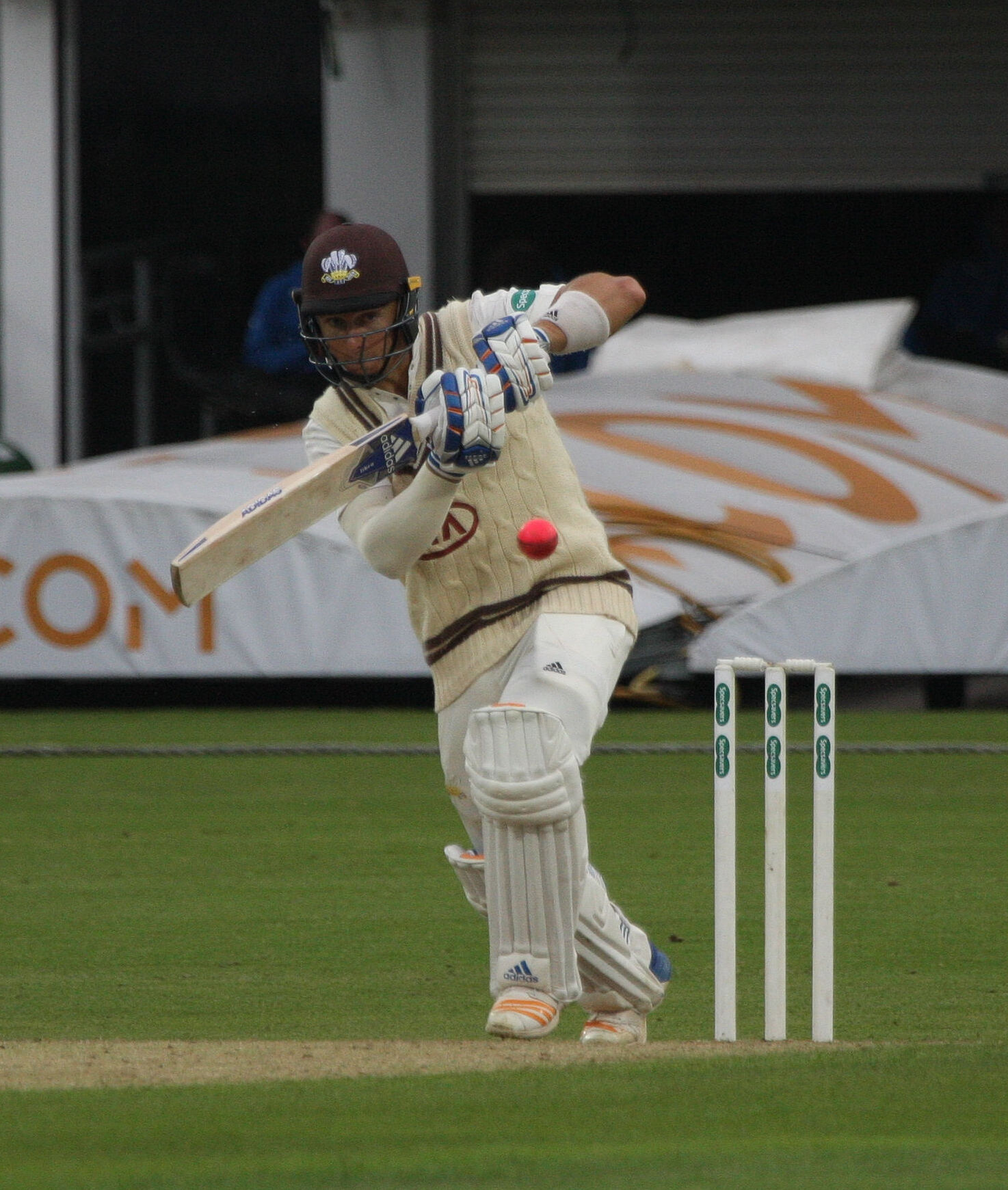
Curran in 2017

Curran represented KwaZulu-Natal Inland at under-15, under-17 and under-19 level. Noticed playing school cricket by former Surrey captain Ian Greig, he was invited to play for the Surrey second XI in 2012, and was transferred to Wellington College in September of that year. He made his senior debut for Surrey in a List A match against Essex in August 2013, and his First Class debut against Cambridge University in April 2014. In August 2017, he was named in Cape Town Knight Riders' squad for the first season of the T20 Global League. However, in October 2017, Cricket South Africa initially postponed the tournament until November 2018, with it being cancelled soon after.

Curran was announced as the replacement for Mitchell Starc by Kolkata Knight Riders for the 2018 Indian Premier League, where he played 5 matches and took 6 wickets.

On 25 July 2019, in the 2019 t20 Blast match against Glamorgan, Curran took a hat-trick, finishing with figures of three wickets for three runs from the two overs he bowled.

In September 2019, Curran was named in the squad for the Tshwane Spartans team for the 2019 Mzansi Super League tournament.

In December 2019, in the 2020 IPL auction, Curran was bought by the Rajasthan Royals from his base price of INR 1 crore ahead of the 2020 IPL.

In February 2021, in the 2021 IPL auction, Curran was bought by the Delhi Capitals ahead of the 2021 IPL. In April 2022, he was bought by the Oval Invincibles for the 2022 season of The Hundred.

In December 2023, while playing for the Sydney Sixers, Curran was suspended for 4 matches of the Big Bash season after being found guilty of intimidating an umpire in a pre-match altercation.

== International cricket ==
Eligible to play for South Africa, Zimbabwe or England, Curran was selected for the England Performance Programme squad in September 2015; he completed his residential qualification for England in October 2015. He received his first call-up to a full English squad in February 2017, for the One Day International (ODI) tour of the West Indies, as cover for Jake Ball.

In June 2017, Curran was named in England's Twenty20 International (T20I) squad for their series against South Africa. He made his T20I debut for England against South Africa on 23 June 2017 at Taunton, taking 3 wickets for 33 runs, including a wicket in his first over. He was named in England's ODI squad for their next series, against the West Indies, and made his ODI debut against the West Indies on 29 September 2017.

In November 2017, Curran was added to England's Test squad as a replacement for Steven Finn for the Ashes series in Australia. Prior to the fourth Test, starting at the MCG on Boxing Day, Curran was named as a replacement for the injured Craig Overton, giving him his Test debut. During his debut Test, he had dismissed David Warner, caught at mid-on for 99. However, TV replays showed that Curran had over-stepped and a no-ball was called. Warner returned to complete his century and Curran finished the day wicketless. He was the third England bowler in four years, after Ben Stokes and Mark Wood, to miss out on a maiden Test wicket because of a no-ball. His first wicket in Tests was Steve Smith.

Curran was named in England's squad for the 2019 Cricket World Cup, but was one of two players – along with Liam Dawson – to be unused, as England went on to win the tournament.

On 9 July 2020, Curran was included in England's 24-man squad to start training behind closed doors for the ODI series against Ireland, and was later named in England's squad for the series. He went on to play in four of England's six ODIs and all six of their T20Is that summer, taking a total of four wickets.

In September 2021, Curran was named as one of three travelling reserves in England's squad for the 2021 ICC Men's T20 World Cup. The following month, he was added to England's main squad for the World Cup, replacing his brother, Sam, who was ruled out due to a back injury.
