= Tom Curren (footballer) =

Australian rules footballer

Personal information
- Full name: Thomas Curren
- Born: 29 July 1992 (age 34)
- Original team: Dandenong Stingrays (TAC Cup)
- Draft: No. 24, 2011 Rookie Draft, St Kilda
- Height: 178 cm (5 ft 10 in)
- Weight: 78 kg (172 lb)

Playing career^{1}
Years	Club	Games (Goals)
2011–2016	St Kilda	25 (9)
- ^{1} Playing statistics correct to the end of 2016.

Career highlights
- 2012 Sandringham Football Club Neil Bencraft Best & Fairest award.

Tom Curren (born 29 July 1992) is a former professional Australian rules footballer who played for the St Kilda Football Club in the Australian Football League (AFL). He was recruited by the club in the 2011 Rookie Draft, with pick #24. Curren made his debut in Round 17, 2013, against Port Adelaide at Docklands Stadium.

Curren won the St Kilda Football Club Victorian Football League affiliate Sandringham Football Club best & fairest award in 2012.

Curren was delisted at the end of the 2016 season. Tom has now gone on to play for the Nepean Football League, and he has had some games with 67 disposals being produced some rounds.
