= Jack Curran (broadcaster) =

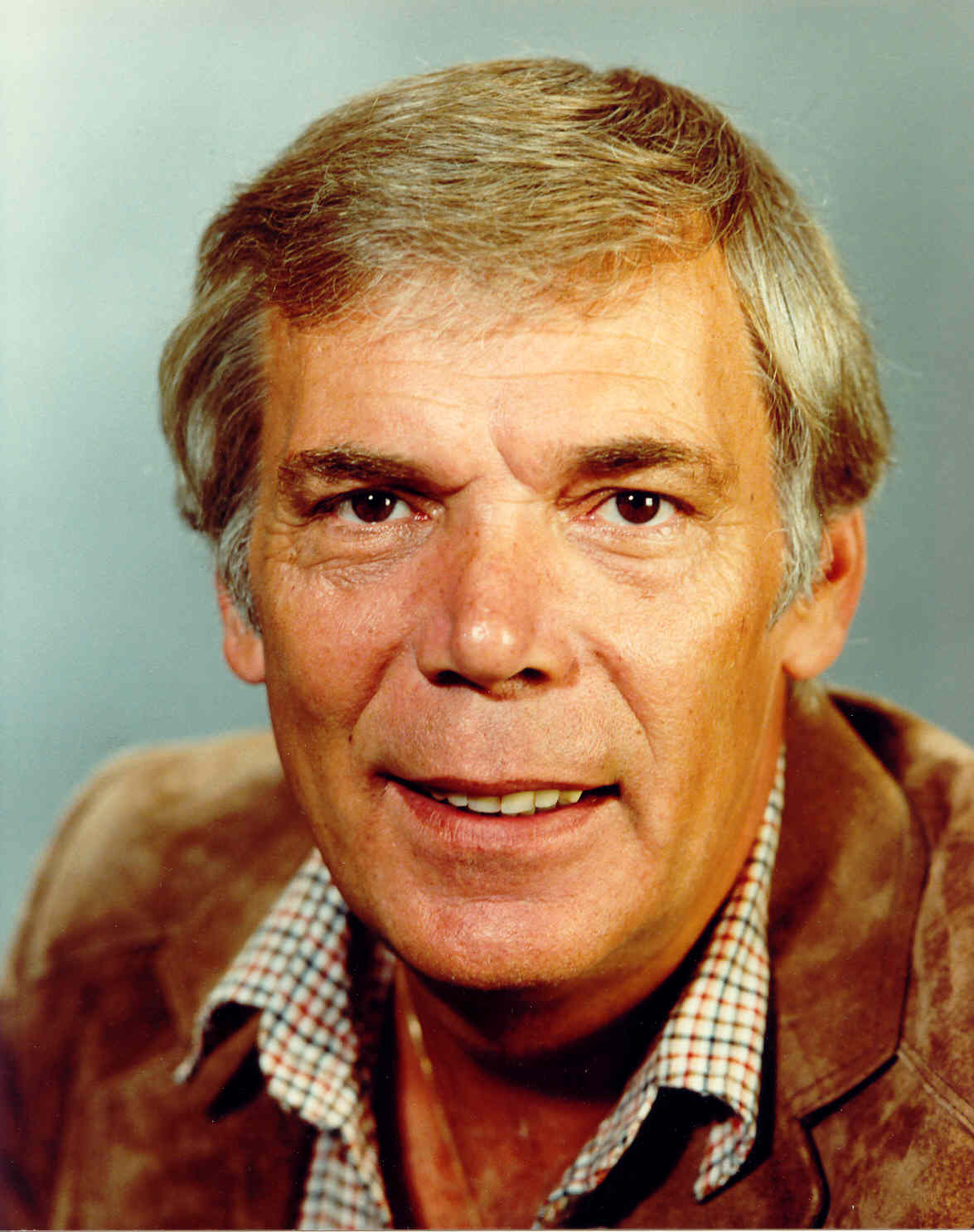
Montreal television and radio host Jack Curran

John Bernard Curran (November 11, 1932 - July 9, 2003) was a Canadian broadcaster. Curran was a well known Montreal television and radio host, actor, narrator and freelance commercial announcer. His career spanned 50 years. He worked for radio stations in New Brunswick, Nova Scotia, Ontario and Quebec.

== Early life and education ==
Curran was born to a large family of Irish ancestry in Grand Falls, New Brunswick. He attended school in Saint John.

== Career in broadcasting ==
=== Early career ===
Curran started his professional career in 1948 at the age of 16, working in New Brunswick for CFBC in Saint John and for CKMR Newcastle. In 1952 he began working at CJCH Halifax, and from 1953 to 1954 he was a staff announcer at CFRA Ottawa.

In 1954 Curran took a job as staff announcer at CJAD-Radio in Montreal; he also presented television commercials for DuPont of Canada during Father Knows Best and for Dow Brewery. During this period Curran acted in leading roles on CBC-TV: Shoestring Theatre and Dorchester Theatre.

In 1958 Curran began working freelance, commuting from Montreal to New York and Toronto. He was selected national spokesman for Kool Cigarettes, Instantine Headache Pills, Edsel cars on the Ed Sullivan Show and The CBS Morning News. In 1961 he became the first prime-time movie host in Montreal on the new CFCF-TV.

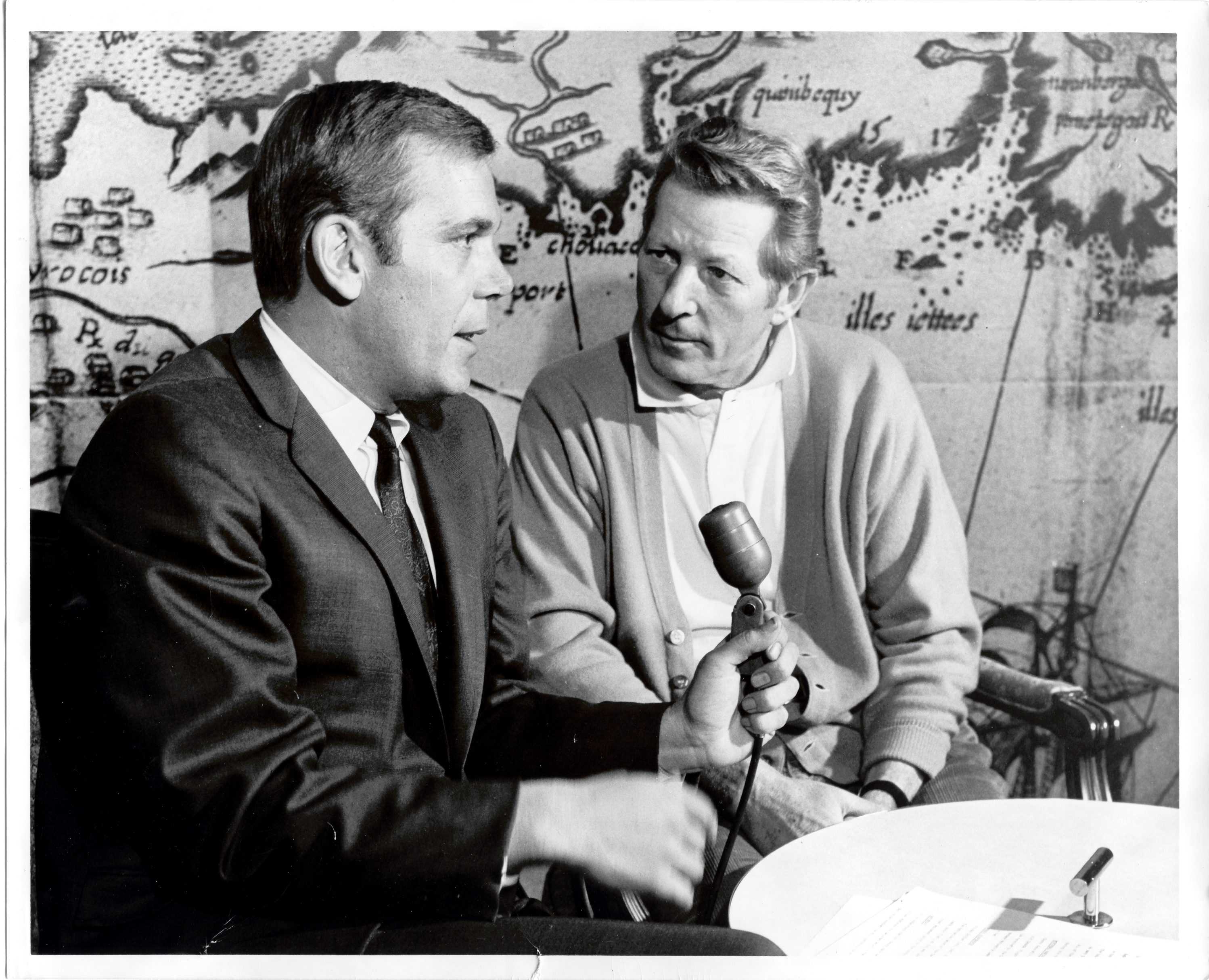
Jack Curran interviewing Danny Kaye for a local Montreal TV talk show In Town

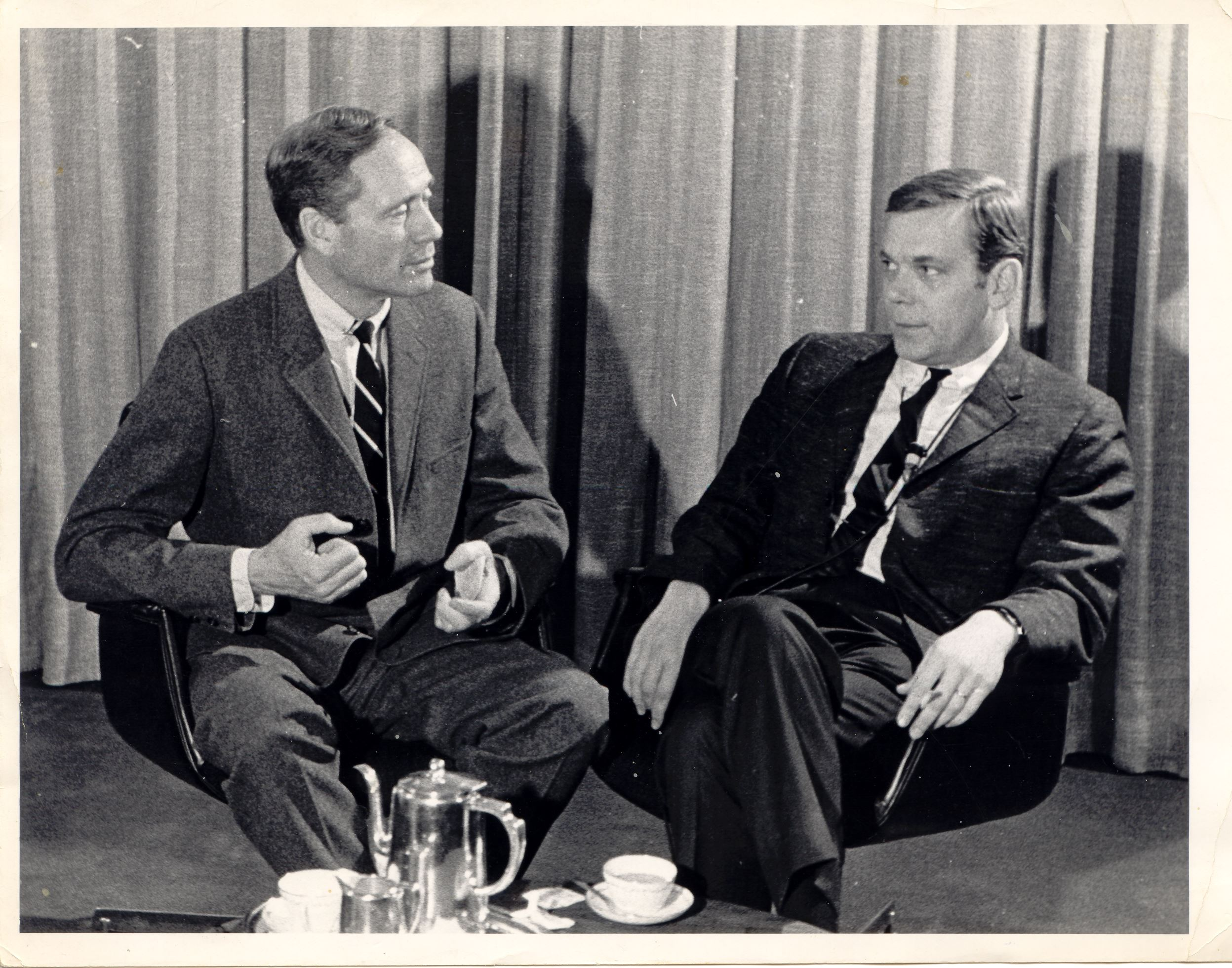
Jack Curran interviewing Mel Ferrer for local Montreal talk show In Town

In 1966 Curran worked as a freelance newscaster-writer on CJAD radio. He was a staff announcer for CFCF-TV and hosted daily talk show: In Town from 1966 to 1972. He was back-up weekday anchorman and weekend regular weekend anchorman for Pulse News from 1967 to 1972. He hosted The Telethon of Stars for its first five years on CFCF-TV, a radiothon for cystic fibrosis on CFCF-AM for three years, and a radiothon in aid of the Montreal Symphony Orchestra (Sinfonia) on CFQR. Beginning in 1970, Curran hosted the nationally syndicated TV travel show Travel 86 for sixteen years. He was also a sportscaster for Grand Prix Wrestling from 1971 to 1975.

Curran provided commentary for the station's midday movie in 1973. He also announced the winners of the monthly million dollar Lotto Canada draws from locations all over Canada. In 1978 he wrote a weekly travel column for the newspaper Sunday Express. From 1978-83 he was on air with CFQR-FM with the top-rated The Jack Curran Show from 10:00 a.m. to 2:00 p.m. daily and freelanced as a weatherman on CFCF-TV, actor and commercial announcer.

=== Later career ===
In 1983 Curran took on the role of program director for CFCF-AM, while continuing to freelance for television. In 1984 Curran accepted an executive role as vice-president of marketing for CFCF-AM, and hosted The Jack Curran Show, daily from 9:00 a.m. to 12:00 noon. In 1985 Curran became vice-president of public relations for CFCF-AM and CFQR-FM. However, later that year he was let go when the station reduced staff.

Curran was soon hired as the weatherman for CJAD, as well as writing and reading news on CKGM in Montreal on occasion. He hosted a show at the Queen Elizabeth Hotel with comedian André-Philippe Gagnon. As a consultant for media and marketing in Montreal radio and TV, he wrote, produced, directed and voiced video presentations for various clients. He also hosted game and panel shows Little White Lie, Four of a Kind; was voiceover announcer for Pay Cards, Excuse My French, It's Your Move, Julie and Caf Conc, all on the CTV network.

From 1989 to 1998, Curran was the morning radio host on CFCF 600 radio in Montreal.

== Other professional activities ==
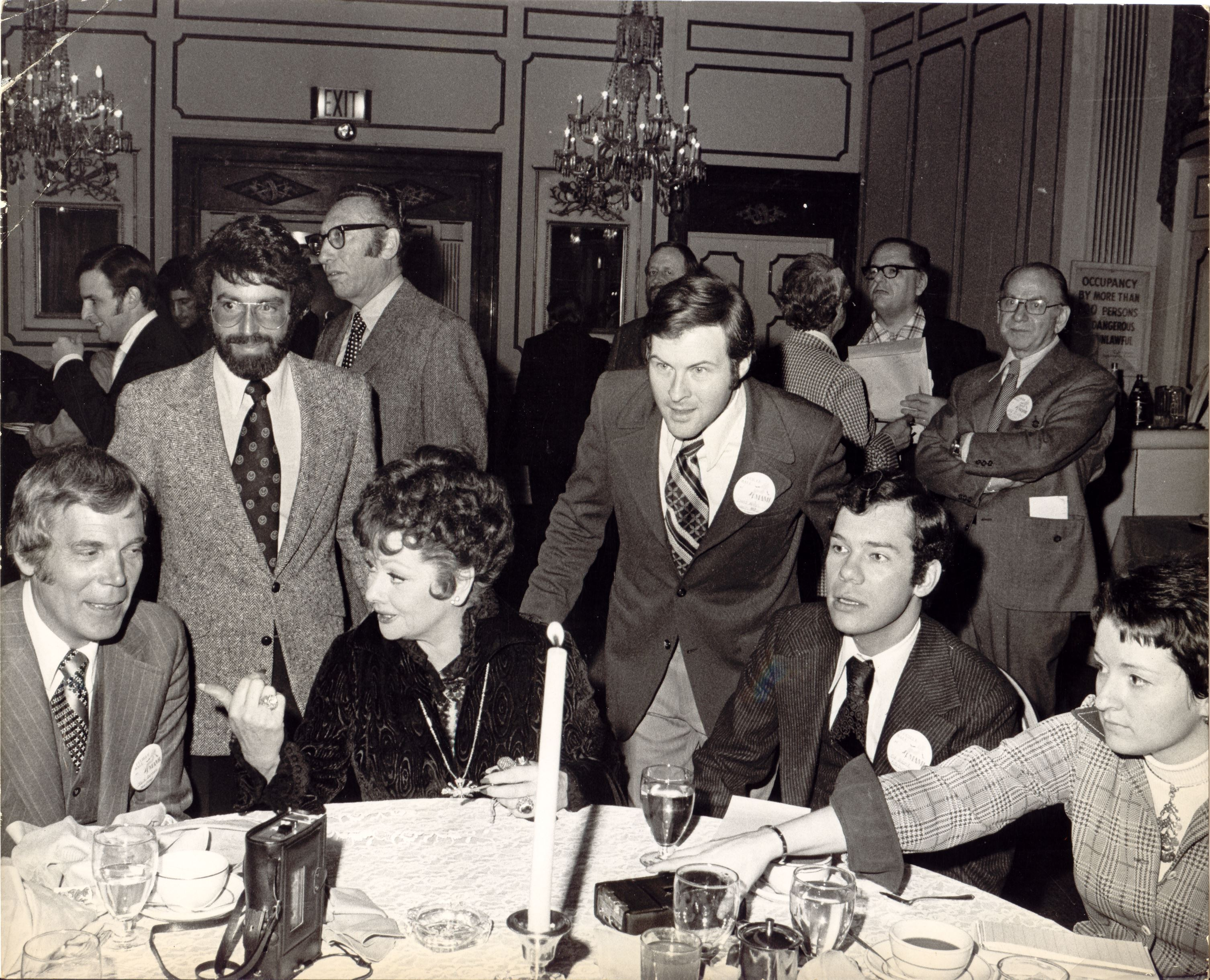
Jack Curran and Lucille Ball

Curran acted in a number of films, including Days of Hope, Willie Grows Up and various National Film Board releases. Later he had roles in Gas (1981 film) and Visiting Hours (film). He also worked on stage in Sabrina, The Rainmaker and The Lady's Not For Burning, for the Montreal Repertory Theatre.

Curran acted as MC and Toastmaster for the Montreal Sports Celebrity Dinner for twelve years. He also MC'd in both official languages at public functions, including the Olympic Ball, Le Bal des Enfants du Monde, the Cedars Cancer Aid Golf Tournament, The Province of Quebec Society for Crippled Children Media Tournament, The Alouettes-Concordes Alumnus Tournament and many charitable events. He was also a guest speaker at meetings of various groups and societies.

== Retirement and death ==
In 1998 Curran retired to Cornwall, Ontario. He died on July 9, 2003, in Ottawa of complications due to cancer.

== Personal ==
Curran married Shirley Dinan in Newcastle, New Brunswick in 1951. The couple had four children. Curran was an avid golfer and spent much of his retirement on the golf course.
