= William C. Walsh =

American judge (1890–1975)

Attorney General of Maryland
- In office 1938–1945
- Preceded by: Herbert R. O'Conor
- Succeeded by: William Curran

Personal details
- Born: William Concannon Walsh; April 2, 1890 Allegany County, Maryland, U.S.
- Died: June 17, 1975 (aged 85) Allegany County, Maryland, U.S.
- Resting place: Saints Peter and Paul Cemetery
- Spouse: Sarah Nee
- Children: 2
- Parent(s): William Walsh, Mary C. Concannon
- Relatives: William Walsh (grandfather); James Edward Walsh (brother)
- Education: Mount St. Mary's University (BA); Catholic University School of Law (LLB)

William Concannon Walsh (April 2, 1890 – June 17, 1975) was a justice of the Maryland Court of Appeals from 1924 to 1926, State Insurance Commissioner from 1931 to 1935, and Attorney General of Maryland from 1938 to 1945.

== Early life and education ==
Born in Cumberland, Maryland, to William Edward Walsh and Mary C. [Concannon] Walsh, he attended Saint Patrick's School in Cumberland and received a B.A. from Mount St. Mary's University in 1910, and an LL.B. from Catholic University School of Law in 1913. He was the grandson of former Attorney General, William Walsh.

Walsh entered into private practice in Cumberland until 1916, when he joined the First Maryland Infantry. He served in the campaign in Mexico against Pancho Villa, and in France during World War I.

== Career ==
In September 1921, at the age of 31, he was appointed as an associate justice of the Maryland Fourth Judicial Circuit; he "was believed to be the youngest judge to ever sit on a circuit bench in the state". He lost the seat in the election held in November of that year, but was named chief judge in October 1924, serving until he lost the election for that seat in 1926.

Walsh then served as State Insurance Commissioner from 1931 to 1935, and Attorney General of Maryland from 1938 to 1945, resigning to form the law firm of Tydings, Walsh, Levy & Archer with former Senator Millard Tydings.

== Personal life ==
Walsh married Sarah Elizabeth Nee, with whom he had two children. He died in Cumberland, where he was interred, in Saints Peter and Paul Cemetery.

Legal offices
Preceded by Herbert O'Conor	Attorney General of Maryland; 1938–1945	Succeeded by William Curran
