= William Curran (politician) =

American politician

William Thomas Curran (April 12, 1885 – October 4, 1951) was a Democratic politician from Baltimore, Maryland. He was elected to the Maryland Senate in 1914 in 1924, and served as delegate to the Democratic National Convention from Maryland in 1924 and 1944, and as Attorney General of Maryland from 1945 to 1946.

Legal offices
Preceded by William C. Walsh	Attorney General of Maryland; 1945–1946	Succeeded by Hall Hammond
