= 2026 in Indian sports =

2026 Sporting season for India

The year 2026 in Indian sports describes the new sporting events that have happened, or will happen, in 2026. The main highlights for this year are: the 2026 Men's T20 World Cup in India and Sri Lanka, 2026 Commonwealth Games in Glasgow, Scotland, the 2026 Asian Games in Aichi-Nagoya, Japan and the 2026 Summer Youth Olympics in Dakar, Senegal respectively.

This year, several honours have been awarded to the athletes who have contributed to the nation in various sporting disciplines. Vijay Amritraj (tennis) was awarded the Padma Bhushan. At the same time, the Padma Shri awardees include Baldev Singh (field hockey), Bhagwandas Raikwar (martial arts), Harmanpreet Kaur (cricket), K. Pajanivel (martial arts), Praveen Kumar (para-athletics), Rohit Sharma (cricket) and Savita Punia (field hockey) respectively. The Arjuna Awards were announced in August 2026 to felicitate 17 sportspersons. The recipients include Tejaswin Shankar, Muhammad Ajmal Variyathodi, Priyanka Goswami (athletics); Treesa Jolly, Gayatri Gopichand (badminton); Narender Berwal (boxing); Vidit Gujrathi, Divya Deshmukh (chess); Dhanush Srikanth (deaf shooting); Lalremsiami, Rajkumar Pal (hockey); Surjeet Singh Narwal, Pooja Hathwala (kabaddi); Rudransh Khandelwal (para-shooting); Ekta Bhyan (para-athletics); Arvind Singh (rowing); and Akhil Sheoran (shooting) respectively. The Lifetime Arjuna Award Honour was given to Isaiah Arumainayagam (football).

== Multi-sport events ==
=== Calendar ===
Date	Venue / Event	Status	Medals			
6–22 February	(Italy) 2026 Winter Olympics (summary)	International	0	0	0	0
22–30 April	(China) 2026 Asian Beach Games (summary)	Continental	3	2	1	6
23 July – 2 August	(Scotland) 2026 Commonwealth Games (summary)	International	13	17	9	39
19 September – 4 October	(Japan) 2026 Asian Games (summary)	Continental	21	27	37	85
18–24 October	(Japan) 2026 Asian Para Games (summary)	Continental	30	35	49	114
31 October – 13 November	(Senegal) 2026 Summer Youth Olympics (summary)	International	0	0	0	0

=== Results ===
- Winter Olympics – India sent two athletes with Stanzin Lundup finishing 104th and Arif Khan finishing at 39th position in their respective events.
- Asian Beach Games – India sent a total of 31 athletes, with the nation winning six medals (3 gold, 2 silver, 1 bronze) and finishing sixth in the medal tally.
- Commonwealth Games – The Indian contingent consisted of 122 athletes and won a total of 39 medals (13 gold, 17 silver, 9 bronze), finishing fourth in the medal tally. Boxing was the most successful contingent, with the nation winning seven gold medals.
- Asian Games – India sent 495 athletes across 36 sports and won 85 medals (21 gold, 27 silver, 37 bronze). The nation topped in archery, boxing, cricket, hockey, and kabaddi.
- Asian Para Games – India sent 167 athletes across 11 sports and won a total of 114 medals (30 gold, 35 silver, 49 bronze).

== Archery ==
=== Calendar ===
Date	Venue / Event	Status	Medals			
31 Oct 2025 – 29 March	2026 Indoor Archery World Series	International	—N/a			
31 March – 4 July	2026 World Archery Para Series	International	12	5	5	22
7 April – 13 September	2026 Archery World Cup	International	4	1	2	7

=== Results ===
- Indoor Archery World Series – Kushal Dalal won gold in the men's compound individual at the GT Open. Abhishek Verma won bronze in the men's compound individual and Jyothi Surekha Vennam won bronze in the women's compound individual at the Taipei Open.
- Archery World Cup – The Indian compound women's team clinched the gold medal in the first stage, defeating the USA in the final. Sahil Jadhav won bronze in the compound men's individual in the second stage. The Indian recurve women's team clinched the gold medal in the second stage, defeating China in the final. Dhiraj Bommadevara won the recurve men's individual event in the third stage. He also won the gold medal in the recurve mixed team event along with Kumkum Mohod. The women's compound team won silver in the fourth stage. Prithika Pradeep won bronze in the women's compound individual event in the same stage.

== Athletics ==
=== Calendar ===
Date	Venue / Event	Status
10 January	(United States) 2026 World Athletics Cross Country Championships	International
6 January – 8 February	(China) 2026 Asian Indoor Athletics Championships	Continental
24–25 March	(India) 2026 Indian Indoor Athletics Championships	National
12 April	(Brazil) 2026 World Athletics Race Walking Team Championships	International
2–3 May	(Botswana) 2026 World Athletics Relays	International
22–25 May	(India) 2026 National Federation Cup Senior Athletics Championships	National
5–9 August	(United States) 2026 World Athletics U20 Championships	International
8–11 October	(India) 2026 Indian National Open Athletics Championships	National

=== Results ===
- World Athletics Cross Country Championships – India participated in the competition with seven athletes but did not win any medals.
- Asian Indoor Athletics Championships – Tejaswin Shankar won gold in the men's heptathlon event. Tajinderpal Singh Toor won silver in the men's shot put event. Pooja Singh won a silver medal in the women's high jump. Jothi Aadarsh Ram won bronze in the men's high jump event. Ancy Sojan won bronze in the women's long jump event.
- Race Walking Team Championships – India sent 15 athletes but did not win any medals. Priyanka Goswami finished 10th in the senior women's marathon, contributing to the nation's 5th-place finish in the women's team marathon event.
- World Athletics Relays – India fielded five relay teams; however, none of them advanced to the final round.

== Badminton ==
Date	Venue / Event	Status	Winner(s)
6 January – 13 December	2026 BWF World Tour: 2026 India Open (Super 750); (India) 2026 Syed Modi International (Super 300); (India) 2026 Guwahati Masters (Super 100); (India) 2026 Odisha Masters (Super 100)	International	—N/a
3–8 February	(China) 2026 Badminton Asia Team Championships	Continental	Japan (M); South Korea (W)
8–14 February	(Bahrain) 2026 BWF Para-Badminton World Championships	International	China
7–12 April	(China) 2026 Badminton Asia Championships	Continental	South Korea
24 April – 3 May	(Denmark) 2026 Thomas & Uber Cup	International	China (T); South Korea (U)
26 June – 5 July	(Japan) 2026 Badminton Asia Junior Championships	Continental	China
17–23 August	(India) 2026 BWF World Championships	International	
5–18 October	(Egypt) 2026 BWF World Junior Championships	International	
TBD	(India) 2026 Premier Badminton League	Domestic	

=== Results ===
- World Tour – Devika Sihag won the women's singles title in the 2026 Thailand Masters and became the third Indian WS player to win a Super 300 title. Lakshya Sen finished as the runner-up in the 2026 All England Open after losing to Lin Chun-yi in the final. Shriyanshi Valishetty finished as the runner up in the 2026 Baoji China Masters, whereas, Satwiksairaj Rankireddy and Chirag Shetty ended as runner-up in the Thailand Open and won the Singapore Open by beating Fajar Alfian and Muhammad Shohibul Fikri. Srikanth Kidambi finished as runner-up in U.S. Open. P. V. Sindhu clinched her maiden Japan Open title by beating Akane Yamaguchi in the final. Tanvi Sharma became the youngest and fourth overall Indian WS player to win a Super 300 title after winning the Taipei Open. Ashmita Chaliha became the first Indian player to win the Korea Masters by beating Han Qianxi in the final. Mansi Singh finished as the runner up in the 2026 Pontianak Indonesia Masters Super 100, whereas, Satwiksairaj Rankireddy and Chirag Shetty won the 2026 China Masters.
- Asia Team Championships – Defending champions India crashed out in the quarterfinals in the women's team event, losing to China by 0–3 and finished in seventh position. In the men's team event, India lost to South Korea in the quarterfinals by 1–3, finishing eighth in the tournament.
- Para-Badminton World Championships – India secured 15 medals, consisting of 2 gold, 5 silver, and 8 bronze, finishing third in the medal standings. Pramod Bhagat was the standout player, winning 2 golds in the men's singles SL3 and the men's doubles SL3-SL4 events.
- Asia Individual Championships – Ayush Shetty won a silver medal in the men's singles event after being defeated by Shi Yuqi in the final.
- Thomas & Uber Cup – The Indian women's team finished in 11th position, failing to qualify for the knockouts for the first time since the 2018 edition. The Indian men's team won the bronze medal, after losing to France by 0–3 in the semi-finals. This was their second-ever medal in tournament history.
- Asia Junior Championships – The Indian team finished fifth in the mixed team event and failed to win any medal across both team and individual events.
- World Championships – Treesa Jolly and Gayatri Gopichand won the bronze medal in the women's doubles event. This was India's second medal in women's doubles at the World Championships after Jwala Gutta and Ashwini Ponnappa won bronze in 2011.
- World Junior Championships – Jagsher Singh Khangurra won the bronze medal in the boys' singles event.

== Boxing ==
=== Calendar ===
Date	Venue / Event	Status
20 April – 2 December	(Brazil) / (China) / (Uzbekistan) 2026 World Boxing Cup	International
14–27 October	(Montenegro) 2026 World Boxing U19 Championships	International

== Chess ==
=== Calendar ===
Date	Venue / Event	Status
16 January – 1 February	(Netherlands) Tata Steel Chess Tournament 2026	International
13–15 February	(Germany) FIDE Freestyle Chess World Championship 2026	International
28 March – 16 April	(Cyprus) Candidates Tournament 2026 (Cyprus) Women's Candidates Tournament 2026	International
5 May – 28 August	(Poland) / (Romania) / (Croatia) / (United States) Grand Chess Tour 2026	International
25 May – 5 June	Norway Chess 2026	International
15–28 September	(Uzbekistan) 46th Chess Olympiad	International
TBA	World Chess Championship 2026	International
TBA	Women's World Chess Championship 2026	International

=== Upcoming fixtures ===
- World Championship – (India) Gukesh Dommaraju will face (Uzbekistan) Javokhir Sindarov in TBD 2026 to defend his World champion title.
- Women's World Championship – (India) Vaishali Rameshbabu will challenge (China) Ju Wenjun in TBD 2026 to clinch her first-ever world championship title.

=== Results ===
- Tata Steel Tournament – The country was represented by five players in the Masters and Challengers categories. The best finish by an Indian in this edition was Gukesh Dommaraju, who placed joint eighth.
- Freestyle World Championship – Arjun Erigaisi finished at sixth position, while Pranav Venkatesh could not make past the play-ins.
- Candidates Tournament – Vaishali Rameshbabu won the women's tournament, becoming the second Indian woman after Koneru Humpy to compete in the Women's World Championship. Rameshbabu Praggnanandhaa finished 7th in the open tournament, while Divya Deshmukh also finished 7th in the women's category.
- Grand Chess Tour – R. Praggnanandhaa topped the group stages and later won the tournament, beating Fabiano Caruana in the finals.

== Cricket ==
=== Calendar ===
Date	Venue / Event	Format	Status	Winner
15 Oct 2025 – 28 February	(India) 2025–26 Ranji Trophy	First-class	Domestic	Jammu and Kashmir
24 Dec 2025 – 18 January	(India) 2025–26 Vijay Hazare Trophy	List-A	Domestic	Vidarbha
9 January – 5 February	(India) 2026 Women's Premier League	WT20	Domestic	Royal Challengers Bengaluru
9 January – 6 February	(India) 2026 Indian Street Premier League	T10 cricket	Domestic	Chennai Singams
11–31 January	2026 New Zealand men's tour of India	T20I/ODI	Bilateral	New Zealand (ODI); India (T20I)
15 January – 6 February	(Zimbabwe) / (Namibia) 2026 Under-19 Men's Cricket World Cup	One-day	International	India
6–28 February	(India) 2025–26 Senior Women's One Day Trophy	List-A	Domestic	Delhi
7 February – 8 March	(India) / (Sri Lanka) 2026 ICC Men's T20 World Cup	Twenty-20	International	India
13–22 February	(Thailand) 2026 Women's Asia Cup Rising Stars	WT20I	Continental	India-A
15 February – 9 March	2026 India women's tour of Australia	WT20I/WODI/W-Test	Bilateral	India (T20I); Australia (ODI & Test)
26 March – 31 May	(India) 2026 Indian Premier League	Twenty-20	Domestic	Royal Challengers Bengaluru
17–27 April	2026 India women's tour of South Africa	WT20I	Bilateral	South Africa
28 May – 13 July	2026 India women's tour of England	WT20I/W-Test	Bilateral	England (WT20I); India (Test)
6–20 June	2026 Afghanistan men's tour of India	ODI/Test	Bilateral	India
12 June – 5 July	(England) / (Wales) 2026 ICC Women's T20 World Cup	WT20I	International	Australia
26–28 June	(Republic of Ireland) 2026 India men's tour of Ireland	T20I	Bilateral	Ireland
1–19 July	2026 India men's tour of England	T20I/ODI	Bilateral	England (T20I & ODI)
23–26 July	2026 India men's tour of Zimbabwe	T20I	Bilateral	India
15–27 August	2026 India men's tour of Sri Lanka	Test cricket	Bilateral	India
22 September – 11 October	2026–27 Australia A Tour of India	First-class / List-A	International	Australia
27 September – 17 October	2026 West Indies men's tour of India	T20I/ODI	Bilateral	India (ODI); Draw (T20I)
22 October – 1 December	(New Zealand) 2026 India men's tour of new Zealand	T20I/ODI/Test	Bilateral	India (T20I) (ODI) (Test)
13–17 December	2026 Sri Lanka men's tour of India	T20I/ODI	Bilateral	

=== Men's results ===
- Ranji Trophy – Jammu and Kashmir defeated Karnataka by virtue of a first-innings lead to win their maiden title.
- Vijay Hazare Trophy – Vidarbha defeated Saurashtra by 38 runs to win their maiden title.
- Indian Street Premier League – Chennai Singams defeated Tiigers of Kolkata by 29 runs to clinch their maiden title.
- IND v NZ – New Zealand won the ODI series against India 2–1, achieving their first-ever ODI series victory on Indian soil. India won the T20I series by 4–1, achieving their seventh consecutive bilateral T20I series title after the 2024 World Cup.
- Men's U-19 World Cup – India crushed England by 100 runs to win their sixth Men's Under-19 World Cup title.
- Men's T20 World Cup – India defeated New Zealand by a commanding 96 runs to win their second consecutive and third overall T20 World Cup title.
- Indian Premier League - Royal Challengers Bengaluru won their second consecutive title after defeating Gujarat Titans by 5 wickets.
- IRE v IND – Ireland registered a historic first-ever series victory against India, whitewashing them by 2-0 and broke India's streak of 16 consecutive T20I series wins.
- ENG v IND – England won their first-ever multi-match T20I series against India by a convincing margin of 4-0. They also won the ODI series by 2-1.
- ZIM v IND – India won the T20I series by 3-0.
- SL v IND – India won the Test series by 1-0.

=== Women's results ===
- Women's Premier League – Royal Challengers Bengaluru defeated Delhi Capitals by 6 wickets to win their second WPL title, after 2024.
- Senior One-day Trophy – Delhi defeated Railways by 7 wickets to clinch their second title.
- Asia Cup Rising Stars – India A defeated Bangladesh A by 46 runs to win their second title.
- AUS v IND – Australia won both the ODI series (by 2-1) and Test series (by 1-0), while India won the T20I series (by 2-1).
- SA v IND – South Africa won the T20I series by 4-1. This was South Africa's first-ever T20I home series victory against India.
- 2026 Women's T20 World Cup – India finished third in the group stage and got eliminated from the tournament.

== Field hockey ==
=== Calendar ===
Date	Venue / Event	Status	Winner(s)
9 December 2025 – 28 June	2025–26 Men's FIH Pro League	International	Belgium
28 December 2025 – 26 January	2025–26 Hockey India League (Men & Women)	Domestic	Kalinga Lancers (Men); Delhi SG Pipers (Women)
8 – 14 March	2026 Women's FIH Hockey World Cup Qualifiers (India Leg)	International	England
14 – 30 August	(Belgium) / (Netherlands) 2026 Men's FIH Hockey World Cup (Belgium) / (Netherlands) 2026 Women's FIH Hockey World Cup	International	

=== Results ===
- Men's Hockey India League – Kalinga Lancers defeated Ranchi Royals to win their second title in HIL history.
- Women's Hockey India League – SG Pipers Hockey defeated Shrachi Bengal Tigers in penalty shoot-off to clinch their maiden title.
- Women's World Cup Qualifier – India finished as the runners-up, losing to England in the final by 0–2 and qualified for the 2026 Women's FIH Hockey World Cup.
- FIH Men's World Cup – The Indian men's hockey team finished in eighth place after losing their placement match to Belgium in a penalty shootout.
- FIH Women's World Cup – The Indian women's hockey team secured a historic fifth-place finish, beating world No. 5 Germany 3–1 in the classification match to mark their best World Cup performance since 1974.

== Football ==
=== Calendar ===
Date	Venue / Event	Status	Winner
15 Dec 2025 – 8 February	(India) 2025–26 Santosh Trophy	Domestic	Services
20 Dec 2025 – 17 May	(India) 2025–26 Indian Women's League	Domestic	East Bengal
14 February – 21 May	(India) 2025–26 Indian Super League	Domestic	East Bengal
25 February – 23 May	(India) 2025–26 Indian Football League	Domestic	Diamond Harbour
1–21 March	(Australia) 2026 AFC Women's Asian Cup	Continental	Japan
23 March – 3 April	(Maldives) 2026 SAFF U-20 Championship	Regional	Bangladesh
25–31 March	(India) 2026 Tri-Nation Series	Trilateral	Tajikistan
1–18 April	(Thailand) 2026 AFC U-20 Women's Asian Cup	Continental	Japan
11–15 April	2026 FIFA Women's Series (Kenya Stage)	Continental	Australia
1–17 May	(China) 2026 AFC U-17 Women's Asian Cup	Continental	North Korea
5–22 May	(Saudi Arabia) 2026 AFC U-17 Asian Cup	Continental	Japan
25 May – 5 June	(India) 2026 SAFF Women's Championship	Regional	India
26–30 May	(England) 2026 Unity Cup	Quadlateral	Nigeria
25 July – 23 August	(India) 2026 Durand Cup	Domestic	East Bengal
17–23 August	(Malaysia) 2026 AFC WCL Preliminary Stage	Continental	East Bengal
21 September – 6 October	(Bangladesh) 2026 SAFF Championship	Regional	

=== Men's Results ===
- Santosh Trophy – Services defeated Kerala by 1–0 to clinch their eighth title.
- Indian Super League – East Bengal won their first-ever ISL title and became the national champions since the 2003–04 NFL.
- Indian Football League – Diamond Harbour won their first-ever IFL title and were promoted to the Indian Super League.
- U-20 SAFF Championship – India ended as runner-up after they got beaten by Bangladesh by 3–4 on penalties in the final.
- U-23 Tri-Nation Series – India finished as the runner-up in the tournament after being defeated by Tajikistan with a score of 0–1.
- U-17 Asian Cup – India did not win any matches and failed to advance past the group stage.
- Unity Cup - India did not win any matches and finished bottom of the table without scoring any goal.

=== Women's Results ===
- Indian Women's League – East Bengal won their second-consecutive IWL title.
- Women's Asian Cup – India did not win any matches and failed to advance past the group stage.
- Women's U-20 Asian Cup – India did not advance past the group stage, but concluded its campaign on a high note by defeating the higher-ranked Chinese Taipei 1–3.
- FIFA Series – India finished third in the Kenya stage of the tournament, defeating Malawi in the third-place playoff by 3–2.
- Women's U-17 Asian Cup – India finished 7th in the tournament after a 0–3 defeat to China. This represents their best-ever finish in tournament history.

== Futsal ==
=== Calendar ===
Date	Venue / Event	Status	Winner
13 – 25 January	(Thailand) 2026 SAFF Women's Futsal Championship	Regional	Bangladesh
14 – 26 January	(Thailand) 2026 SAFF Futsal Championship	Regional	Maldives

=== Results ===
- SAFF Men's Futsal Championship – India finished as the runners-up in the tournament with 3 wins, 2 draws and 1 loss.
- SAFF Women's Futsal Championship – India finished as the runners-up in the tournament with 4 wins and 2 losses.

== Golf ==
=== Calendar ===
Date	Venue / Event	Status
3 February – TBA	2026 Professional Golf Tour of India	Domestic
11 February – 28 November	2026 Asian Development Tour	Continental
23 September – 6 December	(India) 2026 Indian Golf Premier League	Domestic

=== Results ===
- Asian Development Tour – Pukhraj Singh Gill won the ADT Players Championship, which was also part of the 2026 Professional Golf of Malaysia Tour.

== Handball ==
=== Calendar ===
Date	Venue / Event	Status	Winner
15 – 29 January	(Kuwait) 2026 Asian Men's Handball Championship	International	Bahrain
24 June – 5 July	(China) 2026 IHF Women's U20 Handball World Championship	International	Germany

=== Results ===
- Asian Men's Handball Championship – India finished in fifteenth place and did not win any matches in the tournament.
- IHF Women's U20 Handball World Championship – India finished in 32nd place and did not win any matches in the tournament.

== Pickleball ==
=== Calendar ===
Date	Venue / Event	Status
24 January – 8 February	(India) 2026 World Pickleball League	Domestic

=== Results ===
- World Pickleball League – Dilli Dilwale defeated Chennai Super Champs by 3-2 to clinch their maiden title.

== Rugby ==
=== Calendar ===
Date	Venue / Event	Status	Winners
16–28 June	(India) 2026 Rugby Premier League	Domestic	Hyderabad Heroes (M); Delhi Redz (W)

== Sepaktakraw ==
=== Calendar ===
Date	Venue / Event	Status	Winner
16–23 May	(Malaysia) 2026 ISTAF World Cup	International	Malaysia
3–11 August	(Thailand) 2026 King's Cup	International	Thailand

=== Results ===
- ISTAF World Cup – The Indian men's national team achieved a historic milestone by capturing the Silver Medal in the high-stakes quadrant category. India advanced to the final after defeating powerhouse Myanmar in the semifinals, before finishing as runners-up to the host nation, Malaysia.
- King's Cup World Championship – India secured the Bronze Medal in the men's quadrant. The Indian squad clinched a spot on the world podium after a hard-fought, three-set battle in the semifinals against the hosts and eventual champions, Thailand, losing 15–9, 9–15, 9–15.

== Shooting ==
=== Calendar ===
Date	Venue / Event	Status	Medals / Winners
2 – 14 February	(India) 2026 Asian Rifle/Pistol Championships	Continental	India
25 March – 8 December	2026 ISSF World Cup	International	
15 – 26 June	(Germany) 2026 ISSF Junior World Championships	International	India
3 – 14 September	(South Korea) 2026 World Para Shooting Championships	International	
TBD	2026 Shooting League of India	Domestic	

=== Results ===
- Asian Rifle/Pistol Championships – India achieved a total of 94 medals, including 51 gold, 23 silver, and 20 bronze, across both senior and junior events, finishing at the top of the medal tally.
- World Cup – Palak Gulia and Mukesh Nelavalli won gold in the mixed 10m air pistol event in the second stage. Vivaan Kapoor and Neeru Dhanda won bronze in the mixed trap event in the third stage. Esha Singh won a gold medal and broke the world record in the women's 25m pistol event in the fourth stage.

== Table tennis ==
=== Calendar ===
Date	Venue / Event	Status
4 – 8 February	(China) 2026 ITTF-ATTU Asian Cup	Continental
28 April – 10 May	(England) 2026 World Team Table Tennis Championships	International
9–26 July	(India) 2026 Ultimate Table Tennis season	Domestic
13 – 19 November	(Thailand) 2026 World Para Table Tennis Championships	International

=== Results ===
- ITTF-ATTU Asian Cup – India did not win any medals, with Akash Pal being the only player to qualify for the knockouts before he was eliminated in the round of 16.
- World Team Championships – Both the men's and women's teams were eliminated in the Round of 32 in their respective events.

== Weightlifting ==
=== Calendar ===
Date	Venue / Event	Status
2 – 8 May	(Egypt) 2026 World Junior Weightlifting Championships	International
10 – 17 May	(India) 2026 Asian Weightlifting Championships	Continental
22 – 28 June	(Colombia) 2026 Youth World Weightlifting Championships	International
27 October – 8 November	(China) 2026 World Weightlifting Championships	International

=== Results ===
- World Junior Championships – Yash Khandagale won two silver medals and one bronze in the 71 kg event. With this, India finished 13th in the medal tally.
- Asian Weightlifting Championships – India won 10 medals (1 silver, 3 bronze) and finished 11th in the medal tally.

== Wrestling ==
=== Calendar ===
Date	Venue / Event	Status	Winners			
15 January – 1 February	(India) 2026 Pro Wrestling League	Domestic	Haryana Thunders			
27 July – 2 August	(Azerbaijan) 2026 U17 World Wrestling Championships	International	1	4	8	13
18–23 August	(Slovakia) 2026 U20 World Wrestling Championships	International	1	3	2	6
12–18 October	(United States) 2026 U23 World Wrestling Championships	International				
24 October – 1 November	(Kazakhstan) 2026 World Wrestling Championships	International				

=== Results ===
- Pro Wrestling League – Haryana Thunders defeated Delhi Dangal Warriors to claim their maiden title.
- U17 World Championships – India won 13 medals (1 Gold, 4 Silver, 8 Bronze), with Sitender winning the country's sole gold medal in the tournament.
- U20 World Championships – India won 6 medals (1 Gold, 3 Silver, 2 Bronze). Kajal Dhochak retained her U20 title and won the country's only gold medal.

== Volleyball ==
=== Calendar ===
Date	Venue / Event	Status
20–28 June	(India) 2026 AVC Men's Volleyball Nations Cup	Continental
12–18 July	(Bahrain) 2026 Asian Men's U18 Volleyball Championship	Continental
TBD	2026 Asian Men's U20 Volleyball Championship	Continental

== Wushu ==
=== Calendar ===
Date	Venue / Event	Status
4–7 April	(China) 2026 World Junior Wushu Championships	International

=== Results ===
- World Junior Championships – India won a total of nine medals (3 gold, 2 silver, 4 bronze) and finished in 11th position.
