= Indian cricket team in Zimbabwe in 2026 =

International cricket tour

	Zimbabwe	India
- Dates: 23 – 26 July 2026
Captains	Sikandar Raza	Shreyas Iyer

Twenty20 International series
- Results: India won the 3-match series 3–0
Most runs	Ryan Burl (100)	Vaibhav Sooryavanshi (151)
Most wickets	Blessing Muzarabani (4)	Mayank Yadav (5)
- Player of the series: Vaibhav Sooryavanshi (Ind)

The Indian cricket team toured Zimbabwe in July 2026 to play three Twenty20 International (T20I) matches. In April 2026, the Zimbabwe Cricket (ZC) confirmed the fixtures for the tour. All the three matches were played at the Harare Sports Club Ground in Harare.

== Squads ==
Zimbabwe	India
Sikandar Raza (c); Brian Bennett; Ryan Burl; Tanaka Chivanga; Ben Curran; Brad Evans; Wessly Madhevere; Tadiwanashe Marumani (wk); Wellington Masakadza; Blessing Muzarabani; Dion Myers; Richard Ngarava; Newman Nyamhuri; Milton Shumba; Tafadzwa Tsiga (wk)	Shreyas Iyer (c); Tilak Varma (vc); Ravi Bishnoi; ~~Varun Chakaravarthy~~; Harsh Dubey; Shivam Dube; Ishan Kishan (wk); Abhishek Sharma; Ashok Sharma; Suryansh Shedge; Prabhsimran Singh (wk); Rinku Singh; Vaibhav Sooryavanshi; Yash Thakur; Mayank Yadav; Prince Yadav

On 12 July, Varun Chakravarthy was ruled out of the T20I series due to hamstring injury and was replaced by Ravi Bishnoi.

== T20I series ==
=== 1st T20I ===
23 July 2026
13:00
Scorecard

Zimbabwe; 125/7 (20 overs)	v	India; 126/3 (13.2 overs)
Wessly Madhevere 39 (34); Mayank Yadav 2/18 (4 overs)		Vaibhav Sooryavanshi 50 (19); Blessing Muzarabani 2/26 (4 overs)

India won by 7 wickets
Harare Sports Club Ground, Harare
Umpires: Iknow Chabi (Zim) and Percival Sizara (Zim)
Player of the match: Mayank Yadav (Ind)

- India won the toss and elected to field.
- Ben Curran, Newman Nyamhuri (Zim) and Ashok Sharma (Ind) all made their T20I debuts.
- Vaibhav Sooryavanshi (Ind) became the youngest player to score half-century in the history of T20Is.

=== 2nd T20I ===
25 July 2026
13:00
Scorecard

India; 219/5 (20 overs)	v	Zimbabwe; 129 (17.5 overs)
Ishan Kishan 81 (44); Brian Bennett 1/22 (2 overs)		Brian Bennett 32 (19); Abhishek Sharma 3/17 (2.5 overs)

India won by 90 runs
Harare Sports Club Ground, Harare
Umpires: Iknow Chabi (Zim) and Langton Rusere (Zim)
Player of the match: Ishan Kishan (Ind)

- Zimbabwe won the toss and elected to field.
- Yash Thakur (Ind) made his T20I debut.
- Brian Bennett (Zim) scored his 2,000th run in T20Is.

=== 3rd T20I ===
26 July 2026
13:00
Scorecard

India; 192/5 (20 overs)	v	Zimbabwe; 157/7 (20 overs)
Vaibhav Sooryavanshi 81 (49); Brad Evans 2/41 (4 overs)		Ryan Burl 54* (43); Mayank Yadav 3/29 (4 overs)

India won by 35 runs
Harare Sports Club Ground, Harare
Umpires: Forster Mutizwa (Zim) and Langton Rusere (Zim)
Player of the match: Vaibhav Sooryavanshi (Ind)

- India won the toss and elected to bat.
