= Indian cricket team in Ireland in 2026 =

International cricket tour

	Ireland	India
- Dates: 26 – 28 June 2026
Captains	Lorcan Tucker	Shreyas Iyer

Twenty20 International series
- Results: Ireland won the 2-match series 2–0
Most runs	Lorcan Tucker (65)	Tilak Varma (74)
Most wickets	Matt Hollard (6)	Harshit Rana (4); Arshdeep Singh (4)
- Player of the series: Jai Moondra (Ire)

The Indian cricket team toured Ireland in June 2026 to play the Ireland cricket team. The tour consisted of two Twenty20 International (T20I) matches. In March 2026, Cricket Ireland (CI) confirmed the fixtures for the tour, as a part of the 2026 home international season. Both the matches were played at the Stormont Cricket Ground in Belfast.

Ireland won the two-match series 2–0, marking their first-ever T20I series victory over India and ending India's streak of 16 consecutive T20I series wins.

== Squads ==
Ireland	India
Lorcan Tucker (c); Ross Adair; Ben Calitz; Gareth Delany; George Dockrell; Stephen Doheny; Matthew Humphreys; Gavin Hoey; Matt Hollard; Liam McCarthy; Jai Moondra; Harry Tector; Tim Tector; Reuben Wilson	Shreyas Iyer (c); Tilak Varma (vc); Ravi Bishnoi; ~~Varun Chakravarthy~~; Shivam Dube; Ishan Kishan (wk); Prasidh Krishna; Axar Patel; Harshit Rana; ~~Nitish Kumar Reddy~~; Sanju Samson (wk); Abhishek Sharma; Suryansh Shedge; Arshdeep Singh; ~~Mohammed Siraj~~; Vaibhav Sooryavanshi; Washington Sundar; Prince Yadav

On 9 June, Mohammed Siraj was ruled out of the series due to workload management and was replaced by Prasidh Krishna. On 21 June, Varun Chakravarthy was ruled out of the series due to a left foot injury. On 23 June, Nitish Kumar Reddy was ruled out of the series due to a left quadriceps injury and was replaced by Suryansh Shedge.

== T20I series ==
=== 1st T20I ===
26 June 2026
13:30
Scorecard

Ireland; 182/9 (20 overs)	v	India; 148 (18.5 overs)
Lorcan Tucker 50 (36); Harshit Rana 3/24 (4 overs)		Abhishek Sharma 49 (20); Matt Hollard 3/28 (4 overs)

Ireland won by 34 runs
Stormont Cricket Ground, Belfast
Umpires: Roland Black (Ire) and Gareth Morrison (Ire)
Player of the match: Matt Hollard (Ire)

- India won the toss and elected to field.
- Matt Hollard and Jai Moondra (Ire) both made their T20I debuts.
- Shreyas Iyer captained India for the first time in T20Is.
- Shivam Dube (Ind) scored his 1,000th run in T20Is.
- This was Ireland's first victory against India in T20Is.

=== 2nd T20I ===
28 June 2026
13:30
Scorecard

Ireland; 154/8 (20 overs)	v	India; 153/9 (20 overs)
Harry Tector 53 (47); Prince Yadav 3/22 (4 overs)		Tilak Varma 55 (46); Matt Hollard 3/26 (4 overs)

Ireland won by 1 run
Stormont Cricket Ground, Belfast
Umpires: Jonathan Kennedy (Ire) and Aidan Seaver (Ire)
Player of the match: Jai Moondra (Ire)

- India won the toss and elected to field.
- Suryansh Shedge and Prince Yadav (Ind) both made their T20I debuts.
- Ireland won the T20I series against India for the first time.
