= Indian cricket team in England in 2026 =

International cricket tour

	England	India
- Dates: 1 – 19 July 2026
Captains	Harry Brook	Shubman Gill (ODIs); Shreyas Iyer (T20Is)

One Day International series
- Results: England won the 3-match series 2–1
Most runs	Joe Root (249)	Shubman Gill (188)
Most wickets	Sam Curran (6)	Axar Patel (5); Prasidh Krishna (5)
- Player of the series: Joe Root (Eng)

Twenty20 International series
- Results: England won the 5-match series 4–0
Most runs	Harry Brook (229)	Shreyas Iyer (218)
Most wickets	Sam Curran (7); Jofra Archer (7); Josh Tongue (7)	Arshdeep Singh (4)
- Player of the series: Harry Brook (Eng)

The Indian cricket team toured England and Wales in July 2026 to play the England cricket team. The tour consisted of three One Day International (ODI) and five Twenty20 International (T20I) matches. In July 2025, the England and Wales Cricket Board (ECB) confirmed the fixtures for the tour, as a part of the 2026 home international season.

England won the T20I series by 4–0, thus becoming the number 1 ranked team in T20Is. This was also the first time in history that India lost four consecutive matches in a T20I series. In the ODI series, England defeated India by 2–1.

== Squads ==
England		India	
ODIs	T20Is	ODIs	T20Is
Harry Brook (c); Rehan Ahmed; Jofra Archer; Gus Atkinson; Tom Banton; Jacob Bethell; Jos Buttler (wk); Brydon Carse; James Coles; Sam Curran; Liam Dawson; Ben Duckett; Will Jacks; Saqib Mahmood; Adil Rashid; Joe Root; Josh Tongue	Harry Brook (c); Rehan Ahmed; Jofra Archer; Sonny Baker; Tom Banton (wk); Jacob Bethell; Jos Buttler (wk); James Coles; Jordan Cox; Sam Curran; Liam Dawson; Will Jacks; Saqib Mahmood; Adil Rashid; Phil Salt; Josh Tongue; Luke Wood	Shubman Gill (c); Shreyas Iyer (vc); Gurnoor Brar; Jasprit Bumrah; Harsh Dubey; Shivam Dube; Ishan Kishan (wk); Virat Kohli; Prasidh Krishna; Axar Patel; KL Rahul (wk); ~~Harshit Rana~~; ~~Nitish Kumar Reddy~~; Rohit Sharma; Arshdeep Singh; Washington Sundar; Kuldeep Yadav; Prince Yadav	Shreyas Iyer (c); Tilak Varma (vc); Ravi Bishnoi; Varun Chakravarthy; Shivam Dube; Ishan Kishan (wk); Prasidh Krishna; Axar Patel; Harshit Rana; ~~Nitish Kumar Reddy~~; Sanju Samson (wk); Abhishek Sharma; Suryansh Shedge; Arshdeep Singh; ~~Mohammed Siraj~~; Vaibhav Sooryavanshi; Washington Sundar; Prince Yadav

On 9 June, Mohammed Siraj was ruled out of the series due to workload management and was replaced by Prasidh Krishna. On 23 June, Nitish Kumar Reddy was ruled out of the series due to a left quadriceps injury and was replaced by Suryansh Shedge in T20Is while Shivam Dube replaced him in the ODIs. On 12 July, Harshit Rana was ruled out of the ODI series due to hamstring injury and was replaced by Prince Yadav. On 14 July, Brydon Carse was added to England's ODI squad. On 18 July, Washington Sundar was ruled out of the 3rd ODI due to hamstring injury and was replaced by Harsh Dubey.

== T20I series ==
=== 1st T20I ===
1 July 2026
17:30 (D/N)
Scorecard

India; 189/7 (20 overs)	v	England
Shreyas Iyer 68 (47); Saqib Mahmood 3/33 (4 overs)

No result
Riverside Ground, Chester-le-Street
Umpires: Mike Burns (Eng) and Graham Lloyd (Eng)

- India won the toss and elected to bat.
- No further play was possible due to rain.
- Abhishek Sharma (Ind) hit his 100th six in T20Is. He also became the fastest batsman to achieve this feat.

=== 2nd T20I ===
4 July 2026
14:30
Scorecard

India; 190/7 (20 overs)	v	England; 191/6 (19 overs)
Ishan Kishan 49 (40); Sam Curran 3/33 (4 overs)		Jacob Bethell 76* (46); Arshdeep Singh 3/40 (4 overs)

England won by 4 wickets
Old Trafford, Manchester
Umpires: Graham Lloyd (Eng) and Martin Saggers (Eng)
Player of the match: Jacob Bethell (Eng)

- India won the toss and elected to bat.
- Josh Tongue (Eng) and Vaibhav Sooryavanshi (Ind) made their T20I debuts. In doing so, Sooryavanshi surpassed Sachin Tendulkar's record to become the youngest Indian player to debut.
- Abhishek Sharma (Ind) played in his 50th T20I match.
- Axar Patel (Ind) took his 100th T20I wicket. He also became the first Indian spinner to achieve this record in T20Is.

=== 3rd T20I ===
7 July 2026
17:30 (D/N)
Scorecard

England; 201/7 (20 overs)	v	India; 76 (11.4 overs)
Phil Salt 70 (44); Prince Yadav 2/30 (4 overs)		Vaibhav Sooryavanshi 13 (5); Josh Tongue 4/28 (4 overs)

England won by 125 runs
Trent Bridge, Nottingham
Umpires: Martin Saggers (Eng) and Russell Warren (Eng)
Player of the match: Jofra Archer (Eng)

- India won the toss and elected to field.
- Ishan Kishan (Ind) played in his 50th T20I match.
- This was India's biggest loss (by margin of runs) in T20Is. This was also their second lowest score in T20Is.

=== 4th T20I ===
9 July 2026
17:30 (D/N)
Scorecard

India; 158/7 (20 overs)	v	England; 159/1 (13.5 overs)
Shreyas Iyer 80* (49); Jofra Archer 2/20 (4 overs)		Harry Brook 79* (35); Arshdeep Singh 1/41 (3.5 overs)

England won by 9 wickets
Bristol County Ground, Bristol
Umpires: Mike Burns (Eng) and Russell Warren (Eng)
Player of the match: Harry Brook (Eng)

- India won the toss and elected to bat.
- Axar Patel (Ind) played in his 100th T20I match.

=== 5th T20I ===
11 July 2026
14:30
Scorecard

England; 257/3 (20 overs)	v	India; 201/8 (20 overs)
Jos Buttler 131 (64); Shivam Dube 2/22 (1 over)		Ishan Kishan 56 (35); Sam Curran 3/36 (4 overs)

England won by 56 runs
Rose Bowl, Southampton
Umpires: Graham Lloyd (Eng) and Russell Warren (Eng)
Player of the match: Jos Buttler (Eng)

- India won the toss and elected to field.
- Adil Rashid (Eng) played in his 150th T20I match.
- Jos Buttler and Harry Brook (Eng) recorded the highest partnership for the 2nd wicket in T20Is.
- This was the highest runs conceded by India in an innings in the history of T20Is.

== ODI series ==
=== 1st ODI ===
14 July 2026
11:00
Scorecard

England; 258 (47.5 overs)	v	India; 262/4 (45.2 overs)
Joe Root 76* (76); Axar Patel 4/62 (9.5 overs)		Shubman Gill 80* (75); Josh Tongue 1/50 (10 overs)

India won by 6 wickets
Edgbaston Cricket Ground, Birmingham
Umpires: Mike Burns (Eng) and Kumar Dharmasena (SL)
Player of the match: Axar Patel (Ind)

- England won the toss and elected to bat.
- Josh Tongue (Eng) made his ODI debut.
- Jos Buttler (Eng) played in his 200th ODI match.
- Jasprit Bumrah (Ind) took his 150th ODI wicket.

=== 2nd ODI ===
16 July 2026
13:00 (D/N)
Scorecard

India; 233 (44 overs)	v	England; 235/6 (44.1 overs)
Shreyas Iyer 66 (71); Jofra Archer 3/47 (10 overs)		Joe Root 99* (133); Gurnoor Brar 2/67 (10 overs)

England won by 4 wickets
Sophia Gardens, Cardiff
Umpires: Sam Nogajski (Aus) and Russell Warren (Eng)
Player of the match: Joe Root (Eng)

- England won the toss and elected to field.

=== 3rd ODI ===
19 July 2026
11:00
Scorecard

England; 387/3 (50 overs)	v	India; 360/7 (50 overs)
Ben Duckett 141 (135); Prasidh Krishna 2/69 (10 overs)		Rohit Sharma 138 (110); Sam Curran 4/75 (10 overs)

England won by 27 runs
Lord's, London
Umpires: Kumar Dharmasena (SL) and Martin Saggers (Eng)
Player of the match: Jacob Bethell (Eng)

- England won the toss and elected to bat.
- Virat Kohli and Rohit Sharma became the first Indian pair to play 400 international matches together.
- This was England's highest total against India in ODIs.
- Rohit Sharma became the first Indian player to score a century at this venue in ODIs.
