= 2026 Sri Lanka Tri-Nation Series =

- Date: 9–21 June 2026
- Location: Sri Lanka
- Result: India A won the series
Teams
Afghanistan A	India A	Sri Lanka A
Captains
Imran Mir	Tilak Varma	Sahan Arachchige
Most runs
Bahir Shah (187)	Tilak Varma (275)	Avishka Fernando (288)
Most wickets
Farmanullah (10)	Anukul Roy (7) Vipraj Nigam (7)	Kugathas Mathulan (8)

The 2026 Sri Lanka Tri-Nation Series was a cricket tournament held in Sri Lanka in June 2026. It was a tri-nation series involving Afghanistan A, India A and Sri Lanka A, with the matches played in limited overs format. The series took place from 9 to 21 June 2026 in Dambulla.

== Squads ==
Afghanistan A	India A		Sri Lanka A	
List A	List A	First class	List A	First class
Imran Mir (c); Abdullah Ahmadzai; Ijaz Ahmad Ahmadzai; Faridoon Dawoodzai; Hassan Eisakhil; Farmanullah; Khalil Gurbaz; Mohammad Ibrahim; Mohammad Ishaq (wk); Zahir Khan; Noor Rahman (wk); Shams Ur Rahman; Bahir Shah; Faisal Shinozada; Khalid Taniwal	Tilak Varma (c); Ruturaj Gaikwad (vc); ~~Riyan Parag (vc)~~; Priyansh Arya; Ayush Badoni; ~~Harsh Dubey~~; Anshul Kamboj; Arshad Khan; Kumar Kushagra (wk); Vipraj Nigam; Anukul Roy; Ashok Sharma; Suryansh Shedge; Nishant Sindhu; Prabhsimran Singh (wk); ~~Yudhvir Singh~~; Vaibhav Sooryavanshi; Yash Thakur	Dhruv Jurel (c, wk); Devdutt Padikkal (vc); Zeeshan Ansari; Gurnoor Brar; Harsh Dubey; Ruturaj Gaikwad; Narayan Jagadeesan (wk); Saransh Jain; Anshul Kamboj; Aman Mokhade; Auqib Nabi; Ayush Pandey; Shaik Rasheed; Sai Sudharsan; Yash Thakur	Sahan Arachchige (c); Niroshan Dickwella (vc, wk); Avishka Fernando; Nuwanidu Fernando; Ravindu Fernando; Chamika Gunasekara; Vishen Halambage; Chamika Karunaratne; Kugathas Mathulan; Wanuja Sahan; Mohamed Shiraz; Sadeera Samarawickrama (wk); Dulaj Samuditha; Garuka Sanketh; Vijayakanth Viyaskanth; Ahan Wickramasinghe	Sahan Arachchige (c); Niroshan Dickwella (vc, wk); Anjala Bandara; Ashen Bandara; Nuwanidu Fernando; Ravindu Fernando; Chamika Gunasekara; Sohan de Livera; Praveen Maneesha; Asanka Manoj; Keshara Nuwantha; Kavindu Pathiratne; Dulaj Samuditha; Mohamed Shiraz; Dilum Sudeera; Pawantha Weerasinghe; Ahan Wickramasinghe

On 21 May 2026, Harsh Dubey was ruled out of the series as he received maiden call for Afghanistan series and was replaced by Anukul Roy. On 31 May 2026, Riyan Parag was ruled out of the series due to hamstring injury and was replaced by Ruturaj Gaikwad. On 16 June 2026, Yudhvir Singh was ruled out of the series due to shoulder discomfort and was replaced by Ashok Sharma.

== List A Tri-Nation series ==
=== Points table ===
Pos	Team	Pld	W	L	NR	Pts	NRR	Qualification
1	Sri Lanka A (H)	4	3	1	0	6	0.913	Advanced to the final
2	India A	4	2	2	0	4	0.597	Advanced to the final
3	Afghanistan A	4	1	3	0	2	−1.727	

Source: ESPNcricinfo
(H) Host

=== Double round-robin ===
9 June 2026
10:00 UTC+05:30
Scorecard

India A 277/6 (50 overs)	v	Sri Lanka A 269 (48.5 overs)
Ruturaj Gaikwad 101 (114); Mohamed Shiraz 2/67 (9 overs)		Sahan Arachchige 74 (72); Arshad Khan 2/24 (4.5 overs)

India A won by 8 runs
Rangiri Dambulla International Stadium, Dambulla
Umpires: Raveendra Wimalasiri (SL) and Ravindra Kottahachchi (SL)
Player of the match: Ruturaj Gaikwad (Ind A)

- India A won the toss and elected to bat.

11 June 2026
10:00 UTC+05:30
Scorecard

India A 349/9 (49 overs)	v	Afghanistan A 177/2 (25.5 overs)
Prabhsimran Singh 84 (69); Abdollah Ahmadzai 5/68 (9 overs)		Imran Mir 75* (70); Anukul Roy 1/24 (5 overs)

Afghanistan A won by 4 runs (DLS method)
Rangiri Dambulla International Stadium, Dambulla
Umpires: Chandrika Amarasinghe (SL) and Ravindra Kottahachchi (SL)
Player of the match: Imran Mir (Afg A)

- Afghanistan A won the toss and elected to field.

13 June 2026
10:00 UTC+05:30
Scorecard

Afghanistan A 245 (49.4 overs)	v	Sri Lanka A 231/2 (28.1 overs)
Hassan Eisakhil 46 (48); Chamika Gunasekara 3/32 (8.4 overs)		Avishka Fernando 108* (79); Farmanullah 2/40 (5.1 overs)

Sri Lanka A won by 8 wickets (DLS method)
Rangiri Dambulla International Stadium, Dambulla
Umpires: Hemantha Boteju (SL) and Raveendra Wimalasiri (SL)
Player of the match: Avishka Fernando (SL A)

- Sri Lanka A won the toss and elected to field.

15 June 2026
10:00 UTC+05:30
Scorecard

India A 265 (49.2 overs)	v	Sri Lanka A 265/9 (50 overs)
Suryansh Shedge 72 (66); Vijayakanth Viyaskanth 3/26 (10 overs)		Sadeera Samarawickrama 93 (113); Ayush Badoni 2/45 (9 overs)

Match tied (Sri Lanka A won the Super Over)
Rangiri Dambulla International Stadium, Dambulla
Umpires: Prageeth Rambukwella (SL) and Shantha Fonseka (SL)
Player of the match: Sadeera Samarawickrama (SL A)

- Sri Lanka A won the toss and elected to field.
- Super Over: Sri Lanka A 16/0 (1 over), India A 9/0 (1 over).

17 June 2026
10:00 UTC+05:30
Scorecard

India A 319/9 (50 overs)	v	Afghanistan A 218 (36.5 overs)
Tilak Varma 59 (75); Abdollah Ahmadzai 2/62 (10 overs)		Bahir Shah 57 (52); Nishant Sindhu 4/31 (6.5 overs)

India A won by 101 runs
Rangiri Dambulla International Stadium, Dambulla
Umpires: Asanka Nanayakkara (SL) and Chamara De Zoysa (SL)
Player of the match: Nishant Sindhu (Ind A)

- Afghanistan A won the toss and elected to field.

19 June 2026
10:00 UTC+05:30
Scorecard

Sri Lanka A 322/8 (50 overs)	v	Afghanistan A 219 (42.5 overs)
Avishka Fernando 110 (97); Faridoon Dawoodzai 4/60 (10 overs)		Hassan Eisakhil 74 (78); Dulaj Samuditha 5/25 (6.5 overs)

Sri Lanka A won by 103 runs
Rangiri Dambulla International Stadium, Dambulla
Umpires: Raveendra Wimalasiri (SL) and Ravindra Kottahachchi (SL)
Player of the match: Avishka Fernando (SL A)

- Afghanistan A won the toss and elected to field.

=== Final ===
21 June 2026
10:00 UTC+05:30
Scorecard

India A 377/9 (50 overs)	v	Sri Lanka A 311 (47.1 overs)
Vaibhav Sooryavanshi 94 (29); Wanuja Sahan 2/39 (10 overs)		Wanuja Sahan 62 (69); Yash Thakur 3/45 (7 overs)

India A won by 66 runs
Rangiri Dambulla International Stadium, Dambulla
Umpires: Chamara De Zoysa (SL) and Raveendra Wimalasiri (SL)
Player of the match: Vaibhav Sooryavanshi (Ind A)

- Sri Lanka A won the toss and elected to field.

== Sri Lanka A vs India A first-class series ==
Sri Lanka A vs India A first-class series
	Sri Lanka A	India A
- Dates: 25 June – 5 July 2026
Captains	Sahan Arachchige	Dhruv Jurel

FC series
- Result: India A won the 2-match series 1–0
Most runs	Sahan Arachchige (209); Ashen Bandara (209)	Sai Sudharsan (332)
Most wickets	Dilum Sudeera (10)	Gurnoor Brar (10)

After the completion of the Tri-series, Sri Lanka A and India A played two first-class matches.

=== 1st unofficial Test ===
25–28 June 2026
Scorecard

India A	v	Sri Lanka A
452/6d (111.4 overs); Dhruv Jurel 141* (215); Chamika Gunasekara 3/84 (18.4 overs)		330 (101.4 overs); Nuwanidu Fernando 84 (142); Auqib Nabi 4/58 (19.4 overs)
189/8d (57 overs); Devdutt Padikkal 67 (101); Dilum Sudeera 5/49 (15 overs)		70/2 (15 overs); Pawantha Weerasinghe 20 (19); Auqib Nabi 1/18 (4 overs)

Match drawn
Galle International Stadium, Galle
Umpires: Chandrika Amarasinghe (SL) and Raveendra Wimalasiri (SL)

- India A won the toss and elected to bat.

=== 2nd unofficial Test ===
2–5 July 2026
Scorecard

Sri Lanka A	v	India A
366 (110 overs); Sahan Arachchige 127 (207); Gurnoor Brar 4/77 (22 overs)		543 (143.3 overs); Sai Sudharsan 168 (267); Keshara Nuwantha 5/159 (50.3 overs)
209 (48.3 overs); Ashen Bandara 87 (86); Gurnoor Brar 6/68 (12.3 overs)		36/0 (6.2 overs); Sai Sudharsan 25* (22)

India A won by 10 wickets
Galle International Stadium, Galle
Umpires: Hemantha Boteju (SL) and Chamara De Zoysa (SL)

- India A won the toss and elected to field.
