= Vaibhav Sooryavanshi =

Indian cricketer (born 2011)

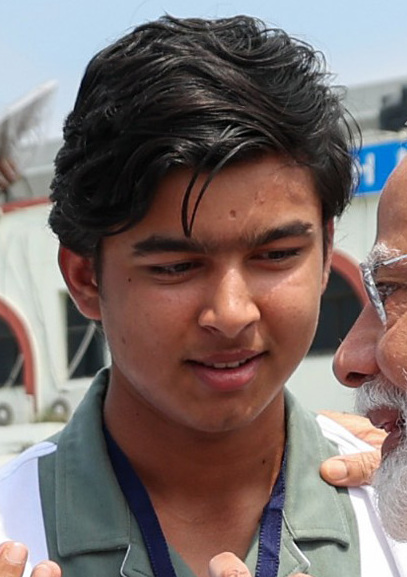
- Vaibhav in 2025

Personal information
- Born: 27 March 2011 (age 15); Tajpur, Bihar, India
- Nickname: Boss Baby
- Batting: Left-handed
- Bowling: Slow left-arm orthodox
- Role: Top-order batter

International information
- National side: India (2026–present)
- T20I debut (cap 122): 4 July 2026 v England
- Last T20I: 24 October 2026 v New Zealand
- T20I shirt no.: 3

Domestic team information
- Years: Team
- 2024–present: Bihar
- 2025–present: Rajasthan Royals

Career statistics
Competition	T20I	FC	LA	T20
Matches	8	11	13	42
Runs scored	246	399	564	1,723
Batting average	30.75	23.47	43.38	42.02
100s/50s	0/2	0/2	1/2	4/8
Top score	81	93	190	144
Catches/stumpings	5/–	4/–	6/–	9/–
Medal record
Men's cricket
Representing India
Asian Games
Gold medal – first place	2026 Aichi–Nagoya
ICC U19 World Cup
Winner	2026 Zimbabwe
ACC U19 Asia Cup
Runner-up	2024 UAE
Runner-up	2025 UAE
- Source: Cricinfo, 23 October 2026

Vaibhav Sooryavanshi (Note: Maithili: [/ʋæbʱəʋᵊ suːɾjəʋənʃiː/]) (born 27 March 2011), also spelled Vaibhav Suryavanshi, is an Indian cricketer who plays for the Indian national team. He is a left-handed top-order batter and an occasional slow left-arm orthodox bowler. He represents Bihar in domestic cricket and Rajasthan Royals in the Indian Premier League. Vaibhav was part of the Indian team that medalled gold at the 2026 Asian Games.

Vaibhav made his IPL debut during the 2025 season, and was the youngest debutant in the IPL at the age of 13. At 15 years and 99 days of age, he is the youngest player to represent the Indian team.

== Early life ==
Vaibhav Sooryavanshi was born on 27 March 2011 in Tajpur, Samastipur district in the Mithila region of Bihar. His father Sanjiv Sooryavanshi, who had aspired to become a cricketer himself during his early career, encouraged Vaibhav to take up cricket. Vaibhav began training at the age of four and his father enrolled him at a cricket academy run by Manish Ojha in Patna when he was nine years old. Vaibhav and his father traveled approximately 100 km (62 mi) from Samastipur to Patna on alternate days for his training sessions. Vaibhav has mentioned the West Indian batter Brian Lara as his inspiration.

There have been confusions over Vaibhav's official date of birth. In a 2023 interview, he had stated that he would turn 14 on 27 September 2023, which implied that he is at least an year and a half older than the age calculated as per his official date of birth. In November 2024, his father, Sanjiv Sooryavanshi, insisted that his official date of birth was accurate and that he had undergone a bone density test when he was eight and a half years old, and has consistently passed the tests mandated by the Board of Control for Cricket in India (BCCI) for age verification.

== Youth career ==
Vaibhav made his debut for the Bihar under-19 team at the Vinoo Mankad Trophy in 2024. In 2023, he played for the India B under-19 team in a quadrangular series, and scored 177 runs in six innings, including two half-centuries. In September 2024, he made his debut for India under-19 team against the Australia under-19s. On his under-19 Test debut, he scored a hundred in 58 balls, the fastest by an Indian under-19 player, and the second-fastest in under-19 international cricket.

At the 2024 ACC Under-19 Asia Cup, Vaibhav scored two half-centuries. He scored 76 runs off 46 balls against UAE under-19s, followed by 67 runs from 36 balls in the semi-final against Sri Lanka under-19s. In November 2025, he scored 144 runs off 42 balls while playing for India A against the United Arab Emirates in the Asia Cup Rising Stars. In the final of the 2026 Under-19 Men's Cricket World Cup, he scored 175 runs off 80 balls against England, helping India win the tournament. He was selected for India A's tour of Sri Lanka in May 2026. In June 2026, in the final of the tri-series in Sri Lanka, he scored the fastest half-century in List A cricket in 11 balls, and finished on 94 runs off 29 balls.

== Domestic career ==
Vaibhav made his first-class debut for Bihar against Mumbai at the age of 12 years and 284 days old in January 2024. In doing so, he became the fourth youngest cricketer to play in the Ranji Trophy, and the youngest since 1986. In November 2024, he became the youngest Indian to make his debut in T20 cricket at the age of 13 years and 241 days, when he appeared for Bihar against Rajasthan in the 2024–25 Syed Mushtaq Ali Trophy. In December 2024, he became the youngest Indian to play List A cricket, when he made his debut for Bihar in the 2024–25 Vijay Hazare Trophy match against Madhya Pradesh at the age of 13 years and 269 days.

In December 2025, during the 2025–26 Vijay Hazare Trophy, Vaibhav scored a 36-ball century against Arunachal Pradesh, becoming the youngest player to score a hundred in List A cricket at the age of 14 years and 272 days. In the same match, he broke AB de Villiers' record for the fastest 150 in List A cricket, when he reached 150 runs in 59 balls, and eventually scored 190 off 84 balls, with 16 fours and 15 sixes. In July 2026, Vaibhav was appointed vice-captain of East Zone for the 2026–27 Duleep Trophy. In the semi-final against Central Zone, Vaibhav stood in as captain for part of the innings, after regular captain Ishan Kishan suffered a wrist injury, thereby becoming the youngest to captain a side in the Duleep Trophy.

== Franchise career ==
In November 2024, Vaibhav became the youngest player to sign an Indian Premier League (IPL) contract when the 13-year old was picked by the Rajasthan Royals for ₹11 million (US$120,000). Sooryavanshi became the youngest debutant in the IPL when he represented the Royals in a match against the Lucknow Super Giants on 19 April 2025. In his debut IPL match, he scored 34 runs in 20 balls, including a first-ball six.

On 28 April 2025, at 14 years and 32 days old, Vaibhav became the youngest player to score a century in the IPL when he scored 101 runs off 38 balls in a match against the Gujarat Titans. He reached his century in 35 balls, making it the second-fastest century in IPL history behind Chris Gayle (30 balls), and the fastest by an Indian. During the innings, he also became the youngest player with a 50+ score in all T20s and equalled the record for most sixes in an IPL innings by an Indian (11), held by Murali Vijay.

On 27 May 2026, Vaibhav scored 97 runs from 29 balls in a match against the Sunrisers Hyderabad. During the match, he broke Chris Gayle's record of most sixes in an IPL season (59) after hitting 12 sixes, taking his total to 64. He won several awards including the Most Valuable Player, Orange Cap for the most runs(776 runs), Emerging Player of the Season, Super Striker for the highest strike rate (237.30), and Super Sixes for the most sixes (72) in the 2026 Indian Premier League season.

== International career ==
In June 2026, Vaibhav received his first call-up to the senior India team for their tour of Ireland and England. He made his debut for India in the second match of the series against England. He scored 14 runs off 10 balls including two sixes before being out stumped off a delivery from Will Jacks. He scored 28 runs in the next two matches, before being dropped for the fifth and final T20I. He was selected in the Indian squad for the away series against Zimbabwe in July 2026. On 23 July 2026, during the first T20I against Zimbabwe, he became the youngest batter to score a half-century in international cricket, when he made 50 runs off 19 balls. He scored 151 runs across three matches on the tour, and was named player of the series, becoming the youngest male player to win the award.

== Playing style ==
Vaibhav is an explosive top order batter, particularly in limited overs cricket. He is known for his ultra-aggressive batting style in which he targets the boundary on the majority of deliveries he faces. His strokes include the pull shot over deep mid-wicket and square leg, the uppercut over cover point to counter bouncers, and lofted shots over covers and down the ground. He is also adept at stepping out and slog sweeping against spin bowlers. His batting has drawn comparisons to left-handed batters such as Brian Lara and Yuvraj Singh, and right-handers Sachin Tendulkar and Virender Sehwag.

Vaibhav's batting technique centers around an unusually high, lateral backlift that is almost behind his head, and a wide stance characterized by a heavy offside lean and predominantly back foot positioning. This gives him longer levers and more torso rotation with the coiling and uncoiling of the upper body to maximize the speed of his bat swing, as per former cricketer and coach Zubin Bharucha. These biomechanical adjustments allow him to impart immense power on every shot. He also utilizes a double downswing, allowing him to play the ball later than most and which also allows him to create a whip effect with his strong wrists when striking. His unconventional "O grip" also helps him execute powerful premeditated leg side shots.

== Honours ==
- Rashtriya Bal Puraskar (2025)
- ICC U19 World Cup – Player of the tournament (2026)
