= Abu Dhabi T10 =

T10 cricket league

- Tournament logo
- Countries: United Arab Emirates
- Format: T10
- First edition: 2017
- Latest edition: 2025
- Next edition: 2026
- Tournament format: Page playoff system with round
- Number of teams: 6
- Current champion: UAE Bulls (1st title)
- Most successful: Deccan Gladiators (3 titles)
- Most runs: Rovman Powell (1,346)
- Most wickets: Qais Ahmed (40)
- Website: https://ttensports.com

The Abu Dhabi T10, also known as the T10 League, is a T10 cricket league in the United Arab Emirates launched and owned by T Ten Sports Management. The league is approved by the Emirates Cricket Board. The matches are 10-overs-a-side. The tournament is a round-robin format followed by a series of playoff matches and a final. The International Cricket Council (ICC) officially sanctioned the league in 2018 as a semi-professional cricket tournament.

The league has seen significant year-on-year growth in viewership and economic value, with the 2021–2022 edition of the tournament having reached 342 million viewers through television and digital streaming compared to roughly 37 million viewers in the 2017 edition. The league's economic impact at the 2021–2022 edition was valued at US$621.2 million.

== History ==
The league was founded by Shaji Ul Mulk, the chairman of T10 League. Ul Mulk intended to bring out the UAE's local talent on a greater stage and entertain viewers by doing something unique, introducing a new cricket format with 10-over-a-side contests.

== Teams ==
Up to ten players on each team during a match can be overseas players, with the remaining player needing to be eligible to represent the United Arab Emirates.

Team name	Debut season	Latest season	Current captain
UAE Bulls	2019	2026	Kieron Pollard
Royal Desert Champions	2026	2026	Nicholas Pooran
Emirates Eagles	2026	2026	Rovman Powell
Arabian Aces	2026	2026	Moeen Ali
United Tigers	2026	2026	Fakhar Zaman
Yas Lions	2026	2026	Jason Holder

== Seasons ==
Season	Winner	Runner-up	Winning margin	Most runs	Most wickets
2017	Kerala Kings; 121/2 (8 overs)	Punjabi Legends; 120/3 (10 overs)	8 wickets	Luke Ronchi (197)	Sohail Tanvir (5); Rayad Emrit (5); Hasan Ali (5)
2018	Northern Warriors; 140/3 (10 overs)	Pakhtoons; 118/7 (10 overs)	22 runs	Nicholas Pooran (324)	Hardus Viljoen (18)
2019	Maratha Arabians; 89/2 (7.2 overs)	Deccan Gladiators; 87/8 (10 overs)	8 wickets	Chris Lynn (371)	George Garton (12)
2021	Northern Warriors; 85/2 (8.2 overs)	Delhi Bulls; 81/9 (10 overs)	8 wickets	Sohail Akhtar (248)	Jamie Overton (12)
2021–22	Deccan Gladiators; 159/0 (10 overs)	Delhi Bulls; 103/7 (10 overs)	56 runs	Hazratullah Zazai (353)	Wanindu Hasaranga (21)
2022	Deccan Gladiators; 128/4 (10 overs)	New York Strikers; 91/5 (10 overs)	37 runs	Nicholas Pooran (345)	Dwaine Pretorius (12)
2023	New York Strikers; 94/3 (9.2 overs)	Deccan Gladiators; 91/5 (10 overs)	7 wickets	Tom Kohler-Cadmore (368)	Qais Ahmad (16)
2024	Deccan Gladiators; 110/2 (6.5 overs)	Morrisville Samp Army; 104/7 (10 overs)	8 wickets	Tom Kohler-Cadmore (278)	Richard Gleeson (14)
2025	UAE Bulls; 150/1 (10 overs)	Aspin Stallions; 70/4 (10 overs)	80 runs	Tim David (393)	Andrew Tye (13)

== Teams' performances ==
Seasons	2017 (6)	2018 (8)	2019 (8)	2021 (8)	2021-22 (6)	2022 (8)	2023 (8)	2024 (10)	2025 (8)
Ajman Titans	–								4th
Aspin Stallions	–								RU
Deccan Gladiators	–		RU	6th	W	W	RU	W	6th
Delhi/UAE Bulls	–		7th	RU	RU	5th	5th	3rd	W
Northern Warriors	–	W	5th	W	5th	6th	6th	6th	5th
Quetta Qavalry	–								3rd
Royal Champs	–								8th
Vista Riders	–								7th
Former teams
Ajman Bolts	–							8th	–
Bengal Tigers	5th	3rd	–						
Bangla Tigers	–		3rd	5th	4th	8th	4th	9th	–
Chennai Braves/Chennai Braves Jaguars	–				6th	7th	7th	10th	–
Karnataka Tuskers	–		8th	–					
Kerala Kings/Kerala Knights	W	7th	–						
Maratha Arabians	SF	4th	W	7th	–				
Morrisville Samp Army	–					3rd	3rd	RU	–
New York Strikers	–					RU	W	7th	–
Pakhtoons	SF	RU	–						
Pune Devils	–			8th	–				
Punjabi Legends	R	5th	–						
Qalandars	–		4th	4th	–				
Rajputs	–	6th	–						
Sindhis	–	8th	–						
Team Abu Dhabi	–		6th	3rd	3rd	4th	8th	4th	–
Team Sri Lanka	6th	–							
UP Nawabs	–							5th	–

== Controversies ==
The Abu Dhabi T10 has come under scrutiny by the ICC due to corruption. In September 2023, eight individuals, including three players, coaches, and team owners, were charged by the ICC with breaches of the anti-corruption code. Former Bangladesh international Nasir Hossain was banned for 2 years, while two other players were banned for 17 1/2 years and 5 years, respectively. In October 2024, ICC anti-corruption officer Steve Richardson, while refusing to state which leagues were in question, stated that the ICC had concerns about short-length tournaments hosted by associate members, such as the Abu Dhabi T10, for their high potential for corruption.

Questions were raised during the 2024 tournament, with cases of a bowler overstepping by a wide margin, as well as another bowling four no balls in an over being reported, leading to further corruption concerns.

== See also ==
- T10 leagues
