= List of India Twenty20 International cricketers =

List of Cricket players

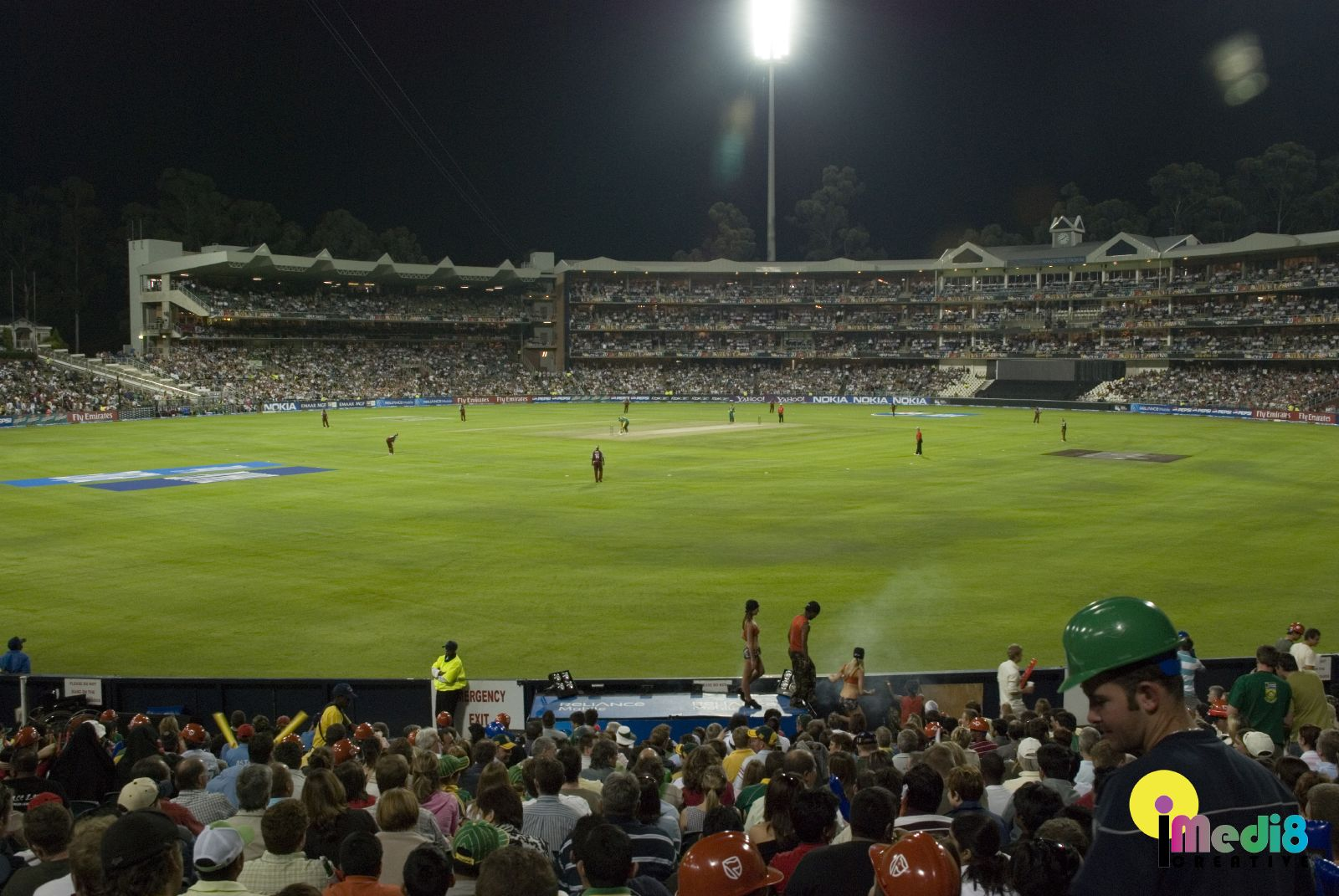
The Wanderers Stadium, Johannesburg, where India played their first ever Twenty20 International

A Twenty20 International (T20I) is a form of cricket match between two representative teams, each having T20I status as determined by the International Cricket Council (ICC), and is played under the rules of Twenty20 cricket. The first such match was played between Australia and New Zealand on 17 February 2005. The Indian cricket team played its first T20I match—under the captaincy of Virender Sehwag—during the 2006–07 series in South Africa; India defeated the hosts by six wickets in the one-off match and claimed the series.

As of January 2025, 119 players have represented India in T20Is. India won the inaugural edition of the ICC World Twenty20, defeating Pakistan in the final by five runs.

== Key ==
General

- ‡ – Captain
- † – Wicket-keeper
- First – Year of debut
- Last – Year of latest game
- Mat – Number of matches played

Fielding

- Ca – Catches taken
- St – Stumpings taken

Batting

- Runs – Runs scored in career
- HS – Highest score
- Avg – Average runs scored per dismissal
- 50s – Number of half centuries
- 100 – Centuries scored
- * – Batsman remained not out

Bowling

- Balls – Balls bowled in career
- Wkt – Wickets taken in career
- BBI – Best bowling in an innings
- Ave – Average runs conceded per wicket

Captains

- Won – Number of games won
- Lost – Number of games lost
- Tied – Number of games tied (Note: Tied matches that were decided by Super Over or bowlout are recorded as ties.)
- NR – Number of games with no result
- Win% – Ratio of games won to those captained (Note: The games that did not have a result are not included in calculating the win ratio.)

== Players ==
- The list is arranged in the order in which each player won his first cap. To sort this table by any statistic, click on the icon on the column title.
- Last updated 8 March 2026.

India T20I cricketers
Cap	Name	First	Last	Mat	Batting					Bowling				Fielding		Ref.
Cap	Name	First	Last	Mat	Runs	HS	Avg	50s	100s	Balls	Wkt	BBI	Ave	Ca	St	Ref.
1	Ajit Agarkar	2006	2007	4	15	14	7.50	0	0	63	3	2/10	28.33	0	0	
2	Mahendra Singh Dhoni‡ †	2006	2019	98	1,617	56	37.60	2	0	—	—	—	—	57	34	
3	Harbhajan Singh	2006	2016	28	108	21	13.50	0	0	612	25	4/12	25.32	7	0	
4	Dinesh Karthik† (Note: Dinesh Karthik has also played Twenty20 International cricket for the ICC World XI. Only his record for India is given above.)	2006	2022	59	686	55	27.44	1	0	6	0	—	—	30	8	
5	Zaheer Khan	2006	2012	17	13	9	6.50	0	0	352	17	4/19	26.35	2	0	
6	Dinesh Mongia	2006	2006	1	38	38	38.00	0	0	—	—	—	—	1	0	
7	Irfan Pathan	2006	2012	24	172	33*	24.57	0	0	462	28	3/16	22.07	2	0	
8	Suresh Raina‡	2006	2018	78	1,605	101	29.18	5	1	349	13	2/6	34.00	42	0	
9	Virender Sehwag‡	2006	2012	19	394	68	21.88	2	0	6	0	—	—	2	0	
10	S. Sreesanth	2006	2008	10	20	19*	20.00	0	0	204	7	2/12	41.14	2	0	
11	Sachin Tendulkar	2006	2006	1	10	10	10.00	0	0	15	1	1/12	12.00	1	0	
12	Gautam Gambhir	2007	2012	37	932	75	27.41	7	0	—	—	—	—	11	0	
13	R. P. Singh	2007	2009	10	3	2*	—	0	0	198	15	4/13	15.00	2	0	
14	Robin Uthappa†	2007	2015	13	249	50	24.90	1	0	—	—	—	—	2	0	
15	Yuvraj Singh	2007	2017	58	1,177	77*	28.02	8	0	424	28	3/17	17.82	12	0	
16	Joginder Sharma	2007	2007	4	—	—	—	—	—	87	4	2/20	34.50	2	0	
17	Rohit Sharma‡	2007	2024	159	4,231	121*	32.05	32	5	68	1	1/22	113.00	65	0	
18	Yusuf Pathan	2007	2011	22	236	37*	18.15	0	0	305	13	2/22	33.69	9	0	
19	Murali Kartik	2007	2007	1	—	—	—	—	—	24	0	—	—	0	0	
20	Praveen Kumar	2008	2012	10	7	6	2.33	0	0	156	8	2/14	24.12	1	0	
21	Ishant Sharma	2008	2013	14	8	5*	8.00	0	0	278	8	2/34	50.00	4	0	
22	Ravindra Jadeja	2009	2024	74	515	46*	21.45	0	0	1,356	54	3/15	29.45	28	0	
23	Pragyan Ojha	2009	2010	6	10	10*	—	0	0	126	10	4/21	13.20	1	0	
24	Ashok Dinda	2009	2010	9	22	19*	22.00	0	0	180	17	4/19	14.41	1	0	
25	Ashish Nehra	2009	2017	27	28	22	5.60	0	0	588	34	3/19	22.29	4	0	
26	Sudeep Tyagi	2009	2009	1	—	—	—	—	—	12	0	—	—	1	0	
27	Murali Vijay	2010	2015	9	169	48	18.77	0	0	12	0	—	—	3	0	
28	Piyush Chawla	2010	2012	7	0	0	0.00	0	0	138	4	2/13	37.75	2	0	
29	Vinay Kumar	2010	2012	9	2	2*	—	0	0	189	10	3/24	24.70	1	0	
30	Ravichandran Ashwin	2010	2022	65	184	31*	26.28	0	0	1,452	72	4/8	23.22	11	0	
31	Virat Kohli‡	2010	2024	125	4,188	122*	48.69	38	1	152	4	1/13	51.00	54	0	
32	Naman Ojha†	2010	2010	2	12	10	6.00	0	0	—	—	—	—	0	0	
33	Amit Mishra	2010	2017	10	—	—	—	—	—	228	16	3/24	15.00	1	0	
34	Munaf Patel	2011	2011	3	0	0	0.00	0	0	60	4	2/25	21.50	0	0	
35	Subramaniam Badrinath	2011	2011	1	43	43	43.00	0	0	—	—	—	—	0	0	
36	Shikhar Dhawan‡	2011	2021	68	1,759	92	27.92	11	0	—	—	—	—	19	0	
37	Parthiv Patel†	2011	2011	2	36	26	18.00	0	0	—	—	—	—	1	0	
38	Rahul Dravid	2011	2011	1	31	31	31.00	0	0	—	—	—	—	0	0	
39	Ajinkya Rahane‡	2011	2016	20	375	61	20.83	1	0	—	—	—	—	16	0	
40	Manoj Tiwari	2011	2015	3	15	15	15.00	0	0	—	—	—	—	2	0	
41	Rahul Sharma	2012	2012	2	—	—	—	—	—	44	3	2/29	18.66	0	0	
42	Umesh Yadav	2012	2022	9	22	20*	22.00	0	0	180	12	2/19	23.33	3	0	
43	Lakshmipathy Balaji	2012	2012	5	—	—	—	—	—	96	10	3/19	12.10	0	0	
44	Parvinder Awana	2012	2012	2	—	—	—	—	—	36	0	—	—	0	0	
45	Bhuvneshwar Kumar	2012	2022	87	67	16	8.37	0	0	1,791	90	5/4	23.10	15	0	
46	Mohammed Shami	2014	2025	25	6	6	3.00	0	0	510	27	3/15	28.18	1	0	
47	Mohit Sharma	2014	2015	8	3	3*	—	0	0	138	6	2/28	30.83	1	0	
48	Ambati Rayudu	2014	2016	6	42	20*	10.50	0	0	—	—	—	—	4	0	
49	Karn Sharma	2014	2014	1	—	—	—	—	—	24	1	1/28	28.00	0	0	
50	Stuart Binny	2015	2016	3	35	24	17.50	0	0	30	1	1/14	54.00	0	0	
51	Kedar Jadhav	2015	2017	9	122	58	20.33	1	0	—	—	—	—	1	0	
52	Manish Pandey	2015	2020	39	709	79*	44.31	3	0	—	—	—	—	9	0	
53	Axar Patel	2015	2026	94	702	65	18.47	1	0	1,684	97	3/9	21.42	36	0	
54	Sandeep Sharma	2015	2015	2	1	1*	—	0	0	42	1	1/39	73.00	0	0	
55	Sanju Samson†	2015	2026	62	1,399	111	28.55	6	3	—	—	—	—	40	7	
56	Sreenath Aravind	2015	2015	1	—	—	—	—	—	22	1	1/44	44.00	0	0	
57	Jasprit Bumrah‡	2016	2026	95	12	7	2.40	0	0	2,014	121	4/15	18.08	15	0	
58	Hardik Pandya‡	2016	2026	138	2,288	71*	28.24	9	0	2,225	114	4/16	27.13	64	0	
59	Pawan Negi	2016	2016	1	—	—	—	—	—	18	1	1/16	16.00	2	0	
60	Yuzvendra Chahal	2016	2023	80	6	3*	3.00	0	0	1,764	96	6/25	25.09	14	0	
61	Rishi Dhawan	2016	2016	1	1	1*	—	0	0	24	1	1/42	42.00	2	0	
62	Mandeep Singh	2016	2016	3	87	52*	43.50	1	0	—	—	—	—	1	0	
63	KL Rahul‡†	2016	2022	72	2,265	110*	37.75	22	2	—	—	—	—	23	1	
64	Jaydev Unadkat	2016	2018	10	—	—	—	—	—	208	14	3/38	21.50	3	0	
65	Dhawal Kulkarni	2016	2016	2	1	1*	—	0	0	48	3	2/23	18.33	0	0	
66	Barinder Sran	2016	2016	2	—	—	—	—	—	48	6	4/10	6.83	0	0	
67	Parvez Rasool	2017	2017	1	5	5	5.00	0	0	24	1	1/32	32.00	0	0	
68	Rishabh Pant‡†	2017	2024	76	1,209	65*	23.25	3	0	—	—	—	—	40	11	
69	Kuldeep Yadav	2017	2026	54	48	23*	8.00	0	0	1,127	95	5/17	13.74	14	0	
70	Shreyas Iyer	2017	2023	51	1,104	74*	30.66	8	0	2	0	—	—	16	0	
71	Mohammed Siraj	2017	2026	17	14	7*	7.00	0	0	372	17	4/17	28.29	7	0	
72	Washington Sundar	2017	2026	60	265	50	16.56	1	0	1,043	51	3/3	23.80	23	0	
73	Shardul Thakur	2018	2022	25	69	22*	23.00	0	0	506	33	4/27	23.39	7	0	
74	Vijay Shankar	2018	2019	9	101	43	25.25	0	0	126	5	2/32	38.20	2	0	
75	Siddarth Kaul	2018	2019	3	—	—	—	—	—	58	4	2/35	21.00	0	0	
76	Deepak Chahar	2018	2023	25	53	31	26.50	0	0	540	31	6/7	24.09	2	0	
77	Khaleel Ahmed	2018	2024	18	1	1*	—	0	0	396	16	2/27	35.12	4	0	
78	Krunal Pandya	2018	2021	19	124	26*	24.80	0	0	410	15	4/36	36.93	8	0	
79	Mayank Markande	2019	2019	1	—	—	—	—	—	24	0	—	—	0	0	
80	Navdeep Saini	2019	2021	11	12	11*	—	0	0	197	13	3/17	18.07	3	0	
81	Rahul Chahar	2019	2021	6	5	5	5.00	0	0	132	7	3/15	23.85	3	0	
82	Shivam Dube	2019	2026	64	991	66	30.96	6	0	524	31	3/4	27.54	24	0	
83	T. Natarajan	2020	2021	4	—	—	—	—	—	96	7	3/30	17.42	0	0	
84	Ishan Kishan†	2021	2026	45	1,328	103	30.18	10	1	—	—	—	—	20	5	
85	Suryakumar Yadav‡	2021	2026	113	3,272	117	36.35	25	4	6	2	2/5	2.50	58	0	
86	Prithvi Shaw	2021	2021	1	0	0	0.00	0	0	—	—	—	—	1	0	
87	Varun Chakravarthy	2021	2026	45	3	1*	0.75	0	0	963	73	5/17	16.61	9	0	
88	Ruturaj Gaikwad‡	2021	2024	23	633	123*	39.56	4	1	—	—	—	—	11	0	
89	Devdutt Padikkal	2021	2021	2	38	29	19.00	0	0	—	—	—	—	1	0	
90	Nitish Rana	2021	2021	2	15	9	7.50	0	0	—	—	—	—	0	0	
91	Chetan Sakariya	2021	2021	2	5	5*	—	0	0	22	1	1/34	34.00	0	0	
92	Sandeep Warrier	2021	2021	1	—	—	—	—	—	18	0	—	—	0	0	
93	Venkatesh Iyer	2021	2022	9	133	35*	33.25	0	0	55	5	2/23	15.00	4	0	
94	Harshal Patel	2021	2023	25	77	18	12.83	0	0	503	29	4/25	26.55	5	0	
95	Ravi Bishnoi	2022	2026	44	65	10*	9.28	0	0	1,012	64	4/13	19.51	16	0	
96	Avesh Khan	2022	2024	25	27	16	13.50	0	0	499	27	4/18	27.85	11	0	
97	Deepak Hooda	2022	2023	21	368	104	30.66	0	1	95	6	4/10	12.66	12	0	
98	Umran Malik	2022	2023	8	5	4*	—	0	0	139	11	3/48	22.09	2	0	
99	Arshdeep Singh	2022	2026	84	89	12	5.93	0	0	1,760	127	5/51	19.70	19	0	
100	Shivam Mavi	2023	2023	6	28	26	14.00	0	0	84	7	4/22	17.53	3	0	
101	Shubman Gill	2023	2025	36	869	126*	28.03	3	1	—	—	—	—	9	0	
102	Rahul Tripathi	2023	2023	5	97	44	19.40	0	0	—	—	—	—	3	0	
103	Mukesh Kumar	2023	2024	17	5	4*	5.00	0	0	324	20	4/22	24.35	2	0	
104	Tilak Varma	2023	2026	49	1,390	120*	44.83	6	2	57	4	1/1	13.75	35	0	
105	Yashasvi Jaiswal	2023	2024	23	723	100	36.15	5	1	6	0	—	—	15	0	
106	Prasidh Krishna	2023	2023	5	—	—	—	—	—	120	8	3/41	27.50	0	0	
107	Rinku Singh	2023	2026	45	665	69*	39.11	3	0	16	3	2/3	6.33	37	0	
108	Ravisrinivasan Sai Kishore	2023	2023	3	—	—	—	—	—	72	4	3/12	15.75	3	0	
109	Jitesh Sharma†	2023	2025	16	162	35	18.00	0	0	—	—	—	—	9	2	
110	Shahbaz Ahmed	2023	2023	2	—	—	—	—	—	32	2	1/13	20.50	0	0	
111	Abhishek Sharma	2024	2026	46	1,438	135	33.44	10	2	165	7	2/3	34.14	20	0	
112	Dhruv Jurel †	2024	2025	4	12	6	4.00	0	0	—	—	—	—	4	1	
113	Riyan Parag	2024	2024	9	106	34	17.66	0	0	74	4	3/5	20.75	6	0	
114	Sai Sudharsan	2024	2024	1	—	—	—	—	—	—	—	—	—	0	0	
115	Tushar Deshpande	2024	2024	2	—	—	—	—	—	36	2	1/25	27.50	2	0	
116	Nitish Kumar Reddy	2024	2025	4	90	74	45.00	1	0	54	3	2/23	23.66	2	0	
117	Mayank Yadav	2024	2024	3	1	1*	—	0	0	72	4	2/32	20.75	0	0	
118	Ramandeep Singh	2024	2024	2	15	15	15.00	0	0	20	1	1/42	42.00	1	0	
119	Harshit Rana	2025	2026	9	57	35	28.50	0	0	168	9	3/33	33.00	2	0	
120	Prince Yadav	2026	2026	2	-			0	0						0	
121	Suryansh Shedge	2026	2026	1	1			0	0						0	
122	Vaibhav Sooryavanshi	2026	2026	2	27			0	0						0	
123	Ashok Sharma	2026	2026	1	1			0	0						0	
124	Yash Thakur	2026	2026	1	1			0	0						0	

== Captain ==
India T20I captains
No.	Name	First	Last	Mat	Won	Lost	Tied	NR	Win%
1	Virender Sehwag	2006	2006	1	1	0	0	0	100.00
2	Mahendra Singh Dhoni	2007	2016	72	41	28	1	2	59.28
3	Suresh Raina	2010	2011	3	3	0	0	0	100.00
4	Ajinkya Rahane	2015	2015	2	1	1	0	0	50.00
5	Virat Kohli	2017	2021	50	30	16	2	2	60.00
6	Rohit Sharma	2017	2024	62	50	12	0	0	80.64
7	Shikhar Dhawan	2021	2021	3	1	2	0	0	33.33
8	Rishabh Pant	2022	2022	5	2	2	0	1	50.00
9	Hardik Pandya	2022	2023	16	10	5	1	0	65.62
10	KL Rahul	2022	2022	1	1	0	0	0	100.00
11	Jasprit Bumrah	2023	2023	2	2	0	0	0	100.00
12	Ruturaj Gaikwad	2023	2023	3	2	0	0	1	100.00
13	Suryakumar Yadav	2023	2026	52	40	8	2	2	82.00
14	Shubman Gill	2024	2024	5	4	1	0	0	90.00
15	Shreyas Iyer	2026	2026	22	12	8	0	2	60.00
