= 2026 National Federation Cup Senior Athletics Championships =

2021 Federation Cup Senior Athletics Championships
- Dates: 22–25 May 2026
- Host city: Ranchi, Jharkhand
- Venue: Birsa Munda Athletics Stadium

The 2026 National Federation Cup Senior Athletics Championships was the 29th edition of the National Championships in outdoor track and field for India. It was held at the Birsa Munda Athletics Stadium, Ranchi, Jharkhand from 22 to 25 May 2026. Several national records were broken during the competition.

== Medal summary ==
=== Medalists ===
Men

Event	Gold	Silver	Bronze
100 m	Gurindervir Singh; Reliance	Animesh Kujur; Odisha	Pranav Gurav; Reliance
200 m	Animesh Kujur; Odisha	Jishnu Prasad; Kerala	Abhay Singh; Reliance
400 m	Vishal Kayalvizhi; Tamil Nadu	Rajesh Ramesh; Tamil Nadu	Jay Kumar; Uttar Pradesh
800 m	Krishan Kumar; Haryana	Prathamesh Deore; Maharashtra	Satyajeet Pujar; Maharashtra
3,000 m steeplechase	Balkishan Chauhan; Haryana	Sharuk Khan; Uttar Pradesh	Sunil Joliya Jinabhai; Gujarat
10,000 m	Deepak Bhatt; Uttarakhand	Shailesh Kushwaha; Karnataka	Prashant Choudhary; Uttar Pradesh
10,000 m race walk	Sandeep Kumar; Haryana	Servin Sebastian; Tamil Nadu	Paramjeet Singh Bisht; Uttarakhand
Hammer throw	Ashish Jakhar; SSCB	Damneet Singh; Reliance	Ajay Kumar; Haryana
Pole vault	Dev Meena; M.P. Academy	Kuldeep Kumar; Madhya Pradesh	Reegan Ganesh; Tamil Nadu

Women

Event	Gold	Silver	Bronze
100 m	Sudeshna Shivankar; Maharashtra	Giridharani Ravikumar; Tamil Nadu	Tamanna; Haryana
400 m	Vithya Ramraj; Tamil Nadu	Ansa Babu; All India Police	Prachi; Haryana
1,500 m	Pooja Olla; JSW	Ankita Dhyani; Uttarakhand	Anju Bala; Haryana
3,000 m steeplechase	Ankita Dhyani; Uttarakhand	Prachi Devkar; IOCL	Anju Bala; Haryana
10,000 m	Ravina Gayakwad; Maharashtra	Soniya; Uttarakhand	Aarti Pawara; Maharashtra
10,000 m race walk	Ravina; Haryana	Reshma Patel; All India Police	Munita Prajapati; Uttar Pradesh
Long jump	Ancy Sojan; Indian Navy	Shaili Singh; Anju Bobby Sports	Bhavani Yadav; NCOE Bangalore
Triple jump	Niharika Vashisht; Punjab	Bhairabi Roy; Railway Sports	Mallala Anusha; Andhra Pradesh
Shot put	Krishna Jayasankar; Reliance	Yogita; Haryana	Shiksha; Reliance
Discus throw	Seema Kaliramna; JSW	Nidhi Rana; Haryana	Krishna Jayasankar; Reliance
Hammer throw	Manpreet Kaur; Punjab	Kulvinder Kaur; Railway Sports	Divya Shandilya; Odisha
Javelin throw	Shilpa Rani; Haryana	Annu Rani; Uttar Pradesh	Rashmi K Andhra Pradesh
Pole Vault	Baranica Elangovan; Tamil Nadu	Nitika Akare; Madhya Pradesh	Krishna Rachan; Railway Sports
