= Indian Street Premier League =

T10 tennis ball cricket league held in India

- Tournament logo
- Countries: India
- Format: T10 cricket
- First edition: 2024
- Tournament format: Round-robin and knockout
- Number of teams: 8
- Current champion: Chennai Singams(1st title)
- Most successful: Tigers of Kolkata, Majhi Mumbai, Chennai Singams (1 title each)
- TV: Star Sports (TV); JioHotstar (Internet)
- Website: ispl-t10.com

The Indian Street Premier League (ISPL) is a T10 tennis ball cricket league held in India, founded in 2024. The league aims to help uncover emerging cricketing talent, with matches played using tennis balls. Actor Salman Khan has been a brand ambassador of ISPL since 2025. He is also the owner of the league's Delhi franchise.

== History ==
The ISPL was inspired by a cricket talent hunt which took place in 2021 in the Dharavi slums, with the idea being to help poorer athletes have a chance to play professional cricket. Former Indian cricketer Sachin Tendulkar has been named as the core committee member of the tournament alongside BCCI treasurer Ashish Shelar, Amol Kale & Suraj Samat who is the League Commissioner and Core Committee Member of the Indian Street Premier League (ISPL) Former India national cricket team head coach Ravi Shastri has been appointed as the chief mentor of the tournament.

The first season was held in March 2024 at Dadoji Kondadev Stadium, Maharashtra. It had an overall viewership of 11 million, and attendance of 500,000. The winners of the first season were Tiigers of Kolkata while the Season 2 in Year 2025 was won by Majhi Mumbai owned by Amitabh Bachchan.

The ISPL has announced plans to start a 6-team Middle East edition in the future.

The second season was held in January and February 2025.

== Organisation ==
=== Player acquisition ===
The player auction for the 2024 season was held on 25 February 2024. In which, 96 players were selected from a pool of 350 players. Each team had a total salary cap of ₹1 crore (US$110,000). A total of ₹4.91 crore (US$520,000) was spent on the players selected.

=== Prize money ===
The inaugural ISPL season offered the champions with ₹1 crore (US$110,000), and the runners-up with ₹50 lakh (US$53,000).

== Rule variations ==
ISPL matches play under T10 rules with these changes:

- Instead of a coin toss, the team captains stand opposite each other and walk directly towards each other, each step from heel-to-toe. The team captain who steps on the other team captain's foot wins the toss.
- Each squad in the ISPL can have a maximum of 18 players, including at least two U-19 players and two players from each zone (North, East, South, West, and Central).
- There is a mandatory powerplay during the first two overs of each innings, where only two fielders are allowed outside the 30-yard circle, while three fielders are allowed outside of the circle in the batting powerplay. An optional one-over batting powerplay may be taken between the third and ninth over.
- Two overs in each inning have to be bowled with a tape ball instead of a tennis ball.
- One 50-50 must be declared by the batting team in an inning. This involves the batting team stating the number of runs they believe they will score in the next over, with a minimum of 16. The batting team picks out of a selection of five of the bowling team's bowlers. If the batting team scores the predicted number of runs or higher, 150% of the runs scored will be added to their score. If they do not, 50% of the runs scored will be added to their score.
- A six which leaves the field area and lands amongst the spectators scores nine runs.

== Teams ==
The cities represented by ISPL teams

A bid of ₹1,165 crore (US$120 million) was made for the six teams, with Bollywood actor Akshay Kumar having the highest bid of ₹251 crore (US$27 million) for the Srinagar based team.

Team	City	State	Owner(s)
Bangalore Strikers	Bengaluru	Karnataka	Hrithik Roshan
Chennai Singams	Chennai	Tamil Nadu	Suriya
Falcon Risers Hyderabad	Hyderabad	Telangana	Ram Charan
Tiigers of Kolkata	Kolkata	West Bengal	Aksha Kamboj; Saif Ali Khan; Kareena Kapoor Khan
Majhi Mumbai	Mumbai	Maharashtra	Amitabh Bachchan
Srinagar Ke Veer	Srinagar	Jammu and Kashmir	Akshay Kumar
Ahmedabad Lions	Ahmedabad	Gujarat	Ajay Devgn
Delhi Superheros	Delhi	Delhi	Salman Khan

== Seasons ==
Season	Venue	Final		
Season	Venue	Winners	Result	Runners-up
2024	Dadoji Kondadev Stadium, Maharashtra	Tiigers of Kolkata; 62/0 (7.4 overs)	Won by 10 wickets	Majhi Mumbai; 58/9 (10 overs)
2025	Dadoji Kondadev Stadium, Maharashtra	Majhi Mumbai; 121/7 (9.3 overs)	Won by 3 wickets Scorecard	Srinagar Ke Veer; 120/5 (10 overs)

== Broadcasting ==
Star Sports is the broadcasting partner of the league, while JioHotstar is the digital streaming partner.

== See also ==
- Backyard cricket
