= Sri Lankan cricket team in India in 2026–27 =

International cricket tour

Sri Lankan cricket team in India in 2026-27
	India	Sri Lanka
- Dates: 13 – 27 December 2026

One Day International series

Twenty20 International series

The Sri Lankan cricket team is scheduled to tour India in December 2026 to play the India national cricket team. The tour will consist of three One Day International (ODI) and three Twenty20 International (T20I) matches. In March 2026, the Board of Control for Cricket in India (BCCI) confirmed the fixtures for the tour, as a part of the 2026–27 home international season.

== Squads ==
ODIs		T20Is	
India	Sri Lanka	India	Sri Lanka

== ODI series ==
=== 1st ODI ===
13 December 2026
14:00 (D/N)
Scorecard

India	v	Sri Lanka

ACA–VDCA Cricket Stadium, Visakhapatnam

- The match was originally scheduled to be played at Arun Jaitley Stadium in New Delhi, but was relocated to Visakhapatnam due to potential weather disruption and renovation work.

=== 2nd ODI ===
16 December 2026
14:00 (D/N)
Scorecard

India	v	Sri Lanka

M. Chinnaswamy Stadium, Bengaluru

=== 3rd ODI ===
19 December 2026
14:00 (D/N)
Scorecard

India	v	Sri Lanka

Narendra Modi Stadium, Ahmedabad

== T20I series ==
=== 1st T20I ===
22 December 2026
19:00 (N)
Scorecard

India	v	Sri Lanka

Niranjan Shah Stadium, Rajkot

=== 2nd T20I ===
24 December 2026
19:00 (N)
Scorecard

India	v	Sri Lanka

Barabati Stadium, Cuttack

=== 3rd T20I ===
27 December 2026
19:00 (N)
Scorecard

India	v	Sri Lanka

Maharashtra Cricket Association Stadium, Pune
