= T10 cricket =

Format of cricket

T10 cricket is a short form of cricket. Two teams play a single innings, which is restricted to a maximum of ten overs (60 legal balls) per side, with the game lasting approximately 90 minutes. The format is inspired by Twenty20 cricket.

== History ==
The first competition using this format took place in December 2017, the opening season of the T10 League (now known as the Abu Dhabi T10) in the United Arab Emirates. The International Cricket Council (ICC) officially sanctioned the league. In May 2020, Eoin Morgan, the captain of the England cricket team, supported the idea of using the format at the Olympics, with former international cricketers Virender Sehwag and Shahid Afridi also supporting the idea. In June 2022, Cricket West Indies became the first full-member cricket board to start a T10 competition, which is called The 6ixty. Later that year, Sri Lanka Cricket and Zimbabwe Cricket announced plans to start their own T10 competitions in 2023.

T-Ten Sports, the organisers of the Abu Dhabi T10, have helped organise T10 leagues in Zimbabwe and the USA. India hosted the Indian Street Premier League, a tennis ball cricket league, in the T10 format in March 2024, with over ₹1,165 crore (US$120 million) having been spent by the winning bidders in order to own the six teams in the competition. In May–June 2024, Nepal T10 was organized in Biratnagar at MBJ Cricket Ground. In April 2025, the BBC reported that at least two undisclosed ICC full members were pushing for T10 Cricket to become an officially recognised cricketing format, though the BBC report added that idea still did not have widespread support amongst ICC members. If the ICC recognises the format, player scores from T10 matches would count towards a player's List A cricket statistics.

== Rules ==
- A bowler can bowl a maximum of two overs.
- The powerplay (a period of the game during which additional fielding restrictions are in effect) in each innings lasts three overs.
  - In some T10 competitions, the third powerplay over is a "floating" powerplay which can be "activated" by the batting team during any of the overs after the first two of the innings.
- Ties are broken by playing a Super Over. (If the tie persists, more Super Overs may be played until there is a winner at the end of one of the Super Overs).

== T10 leagues ==
In 2019, the Caribbean Premier League featured two exhibition women's T10 cricket matches, each played before two of the knockout matches.

In May 2020, Cricket West Indies announced that the first edition of the Vincy Premier T10 League would start on 22 May 2020 but was postponed due to the COVID-19 pandemic. The Vanuatu T10 Blast started one day earlier in Port Vila. In June 2020, Sri Lanka Cricket (SLC) announced the commencement of the first edition of the PDC T10 League. A number of other minor T10 leagues have been started, such as the Cricket Fiji Vakataukata T10 League and the Malaysia T10 Bash.

=== List of T10 leagues ===
==== Current ====
- Abu Dhabi T10; played in the United Arab Emirates, it was approved by the ICC and was first played in 2017.
- European Cricket League (ECL); features 30 domestic champions from countries across Europe; first played in 2019.
- Italia T10 league; an Italy-based T10 league due to start in November 2026, co-founded by Nadeem Shahid and Aamir Akhtar (as Apex T10 Ltd.), with matches to be held at Roma Cricket Ground;
- Guyana T10 Blast; organised by Guyana Cricket Board held its inaugural season in April–May 2024. Six teams took participation.
- National Cricket League (NCL); a US based T10 league which started in 2024. Its "Sixty Strikes Tournament" was held at the UT Dallas Cricket Stadium in October 2024 and 2025. In December 2024, its ICC sanction (Note: Required for Associate Member leagues that host more than four players that have played for a Full Member international team within the last two years.) was withdrawn for violating limits on the maximum number of overseas players per playing XI. In April 2026, WFAA, the league's streaming partner, reported claims that "a revenue issue" had led to months-long delays in payment to some vendors.
- Spice Isle T10; based in Grenada and organized by the Grenada Cricket Board
- Max60 Caribbean League
- Canada Super60; a T10 league played in Canada which started in 2025.
- Nepal T10 League; a domestic T10 cricket tournament in Nepal — i.e., each team plays 10 overs.

==== Former ====
- Qatar T10 League; held just once, in Doha in 2019, it had six teams. In December 2019, the ICC opened an anti-corruption investigation after match-fixing during the competition was suspected.
- The 6ixty; organised by Cricket West Indies and the Caribbean Premier League and scheduled to be played four times a year, starting with a five-day men's and women's tournament in August 2022.
- Zim Afro T10; franchise-based competition established by Zimbabwe Cricket, which held its inaugural season in July 2023.
- US Masters T10 League; based in the United States and featuring former international players, which held its inaugural season in August 2023, second season will take place in November 2024.
- Lanka T10; organised by Sri Lanka Cricket in partnership with the Abu Dhabi T10 league and first season held in December 2024.
- Africa T10 League; organised by Cricket Kenya and planned to start in 2023.

== Differences from other cricket formats ==
T10 cricket is notably shorter than other cricket formats; the shortest format of cricket played at the international level is T20 cricket, in which games are 20 overs per side and last approximately 3 hours. Because of its relative shortness, there is a greater emphasis on fast scoring and hitting boundaries.

== Reactions ==
There have been various positive and negative reactions to T10 cricket, all largely pertaining to the shortness of the format.

=== Support ===
- Many Associate members of the International Cricket Council have argued in favor of T10 cricket becoming an additional international format of cricket and being played at the Olympics, as they believe that the shorter format is more appealing to new fans, and makes it possible to play more games in a day in a single stadium.
- The possibility of completing competitions in a shorter period of time with the T10 format may enable it to be played in more venues, as well as potentially making it more attractive to top-tier cricket players.
- The approximately 90-minute duration of the T10 format may make it a good competitor against other sports of similar time durations, such as association football. Some former international cricketers such as Virender Sehwag and Eoin Morgan have previously used this reason to advocate for T10 cricket as the ideal format to showcase cricket at an Olympics. However, in April 2025 when cricket was announced as returning to the Olympics for the LA 2028 Olympics the internationally successful and commercially proven T20 format was ultimately chosen as the Olympic cricket format.
- Some batters have said that T10 cricket will help batters score more runs in longer formats, while some bowlers have said that the increased pressure on bowlers in T10 will help them play better in longer formats.

=== Criticism ===
- The shorter format has meant that some players have simply not been able to bat or bowl in some matches within the first few years of T10 matches being played. Such a thing has only occurred in more than a hundred years of Test cricket (when also excluding players who didn't take any catches) 14 times.
- Bowlers have argued that they would have no role in the game, since they only can bowl a maximum of two overs. Others counter that bowlers have been able to perform in T10 matches.
- In two years of games from the T10 League, the team batting second won the game 70.2% of the time, meaning that teams gained a significant advantage by winning the coin toss at the start of the game. By contrast, chasing teams only won 54.7% of all T20 matches (excluding games with no winner) in 2016.
- The leagues themselves have been questioned for not adequately preparing for or setting up games. One instance where this was argued was when a T10 League match was abandoned due to the officials not having the DLS rules on hand, as well as when two games ended without any attempt at a tiebreaker such as a Super Over. In a 2024 Texas competition, pace bowlers were forced to bowl spin without prior warning due to pace bowling being deemed too dangerous near the start of the competition.
- There are allegations and concerns around corruption taking place in T10 competitions.
- There are concerns that adding an additional format of cricket alongside the three current international formats could reduce the long-term value of the existing T20 leagues, as well as squeezing out some of the other three formats.
