= Indian Indoor Athletics Championships =

Annual track and field competition

- Sport: Indoor track and field
- Founded: 2026
- Country: India

The Indian Indoor Athletics Championships is an annual indoor track and field competition organised by the Athletics Federation of India, which serves as the national championship for the sport in India. The first championships was held in 2026 at the Kalinga Indoor Stadium in Bhubaneshwar.

== Events ==
The following athletics events feature as standard on the Lithuanian Indoor Championships programme:

- Sprint: 60 m, 400 m
- Distance track events: 800 m, 1500 m, 3000 m
- Hurdles: 60 m hurdles
- Jumps: high jump, pole vault, long jump, triple jump
- Throws: shot put

== Championships records ==
=== Men ===
| Event | Record | Athlete/Team | Date | Place | Ref. |
|---|---|---|---|---|---|
| 60 m | 6.60 NR | Gurindervir Singh | 25 March 2026 | Bhubaneswar | |
| 800 m | 1:47.86 NR | Mohammed Afsal | 24 March 2026 | Bhubaneswar | |
| 3000 m | 8:09.88 | Shivaji Parashuram | 24 March 2026 | Bhubaneswar | |
| Pole vault | 5.30 m NR | Reegan Ganesh | 25 March 2026 | Bhubaneswar | |
| Long jump | 7.80 m | Sarun Payasigh | 24 March 2026 | Bhubaneswar | |

=== Women ===
| Event | Record | Athlete/Team | Date | Place | Ref. |
|---|---|---|---|---|---|
| 60 m | 7.32 | Bhadra Harita | 25 March 2026 | Bhubaneswar | |
| 400 m | 53.73 | Kumari Saloni | 25 March 2026 | Bhubaneswar | |
| 3000 m | 9:42.05 | C. Priyanka | 24 March 2026 | Bhubaneswar | |
| Pole vault | 4.22 m NR | Baranica Elangoan | 24 March 2026 | Bhubaneswar | |
