= Nitish Kumar Reddy =

Indian cricketer (born 2003)

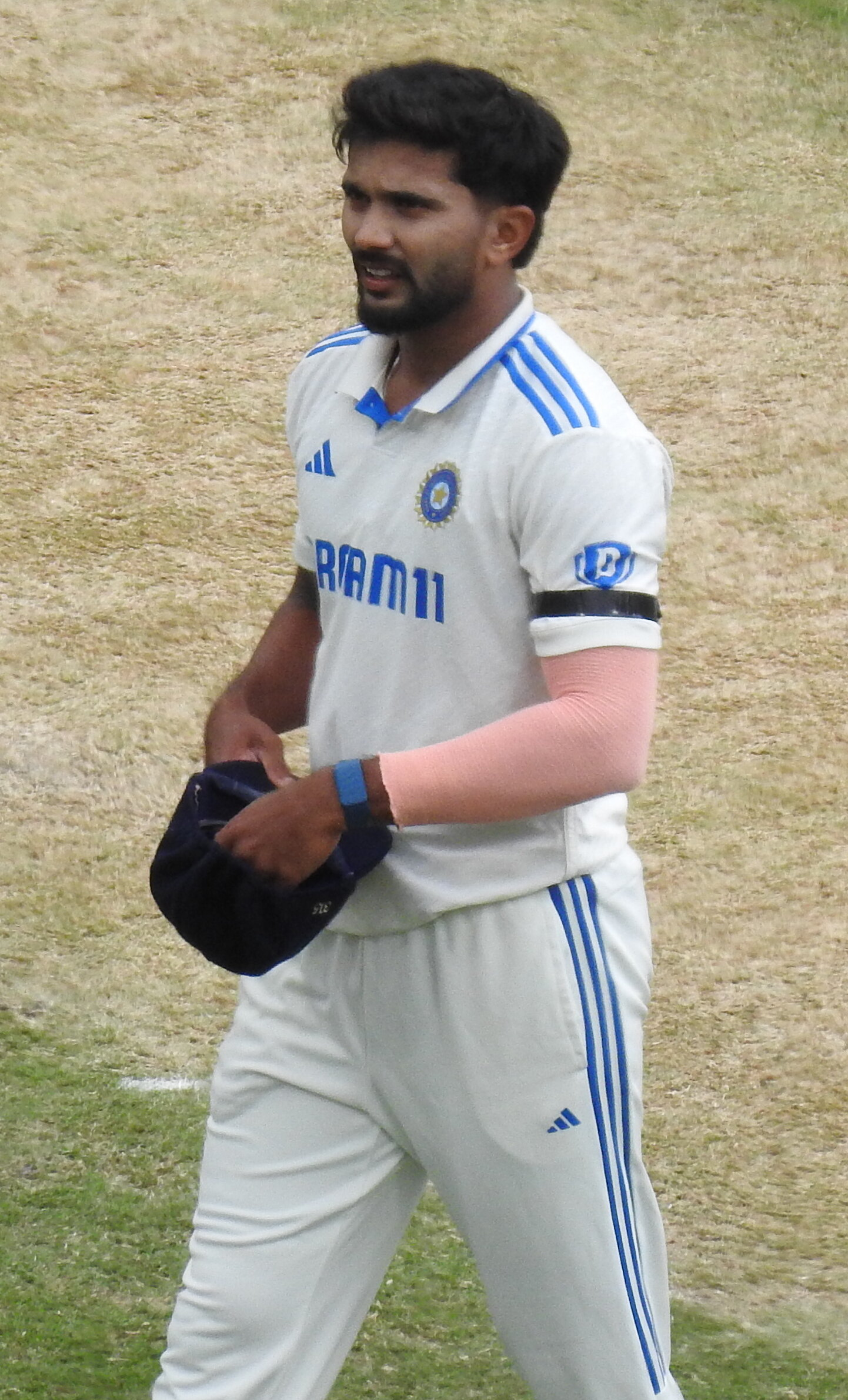
- Reddy in 2024

Personal information
- Full name: Kaki Nitish Kumar Reddy
- Born: 26 May 2003 (age 23); Visakhapatnam, Andhra Pradesh, India
- Batting: Right-handed
- Bowling: Right-arm medium-fast
- Role: All-rounder

International information
- National side: India (2024–present)
- Test debut (cap 315): 22 November 2024 v Australia
- Last Test: 22 November 2025 v South Africa
- ODI debut (cap 260): 19 October 2025 v Australia
- Last ODI: 18 January 2026 v New Zealand
- T20I debut (cap 116): 6 October 2024 v Bangladesh
- Last T20I: 1 November 2026 v New Zealand

Domestic team information
- Years: Team
- 2020–present: Andhra Pradesh
- 2023–present: Sunrisers Hyderabad

Career statistics
| Competition | Test | ODI | T20I | FC |
|---|---|---|---|---|
| Matches | 10 | 8 | 14 | 38 |
| Runs scored | 396 | 109 | 224 | 1,485 |
| Batting average | 26.40 | 27.25 | 32.00 | 25.16 |
| 100s/50s | 1/0 | 0/1 | 0/1 | 2/4 |
| Top score | 114 | 53 | 74 | 159 |
| Balls bowled | 456 | 222 | 240 | 3,787 |
| Wickets | 8 | 3 | 14 | 70 |
| Bowling average | 45.75 | – | 28.57 | 30.81 |
| 5 wickets in innings | 0 | – | 0 | 2 |
| 10 wickets in match | 0 | – | 0 | 0 |
| Best bowling | 2/32 | – | 3/24 | 5/53 |
| Catches/stumpings | 5/– | 2/– | 5/– | 22/– |
- Source: ESPNcricinfo, 1 November 2026

Kaki Nitish Kumar Reddy (Telugu: [nitiːʃ kumaːɾ ɾeɖːiː]; born 26 May 2003) is an Indian international cricketer. He plays for the India national team in all three formats: as an all-rounder, who bats right-handed and bowls right-arm medium fast. He represents Andhra in domestic cricket and Sunrisers Hyderabad in the Indian Premier League.

== Early life and career ==
Reddy was born on 26 May 2003 in Visakhapatnam, Andhra Pradesh, and is the son of former Hindustan Zinc employee Mutyala Reddy.

Reddy started playing cricket at the age of 5 with a plastic bat and would regularly visit the Hindustan Zinc grounds to watch seniors play cricket. With support from his father, who quit his job when he was transferred to Udaipur, to help his son pursue a cricket career, Reddy visited VDCA camps and initially trained under coaches Kumara swamy, Krishna Rao and Watekar.

Reddy said of his father's decision: "I was 12 or 13 when my dad quit his job. He was transferred to Udaipur. He analysed the cricket there and was afraid of the politics that might affect my game. He quit his job and dedicated his time to my game. Relatives questioned his decisions. He is the first person who believed in me".

Reddy was spotted by former Indian cricketer and selector MSK Prasad during Under-12 and Under-14 age group matches and got picked up to train in the Andhra Cricket Association (ACA) academy in Kadapa under the coaching of Madhusudhana Reddy and Srinivasa Rao.

He followed this up with a trailblazing season scoring 441 against Nagaland, the quadruple ton coming in just 345 deliveries and ending up with 1237 runs at an average of 176.41, a tournament record, along with 26 wickets in the 2017–18 Vijay Merchant Trophy. This earned him the BCCI 'Best Cricketer in the Under-16' Jagmohan Dalmiya award for the season 2017–2018. Reddy is the first player from the ACA to receive the award.

== IPL career ==
Reddy was bought by Sunrisers Hyderabad for Rs. 20 lakh in the 2023 Indian Premier League auction. He played just two matches in the league, where he bowled a few overs but did not get to bat. He had a breakout performance in the 2024 season, where he won the Emerging Player of the Year Award by scoring 303 runs with a strike rate of 142 with crucial knocks against the Punjab Kings and Rajasthan Royals and also picked up 3 wickets in the tournament, showcasing his talent and consistency throughout the tournament. He was subsequently retained by SRH in the 2025 IPL Auction for Rs. 6 crores. . In the 2025 Indian Premier League, Reddy played 13 matches for Sunrisers Hyderabad, scoring 182 runs at a strike rate of 118.95 with a highest score of 32 and taking two wickets. He rebounded strongly in the 2026 Indian Premier League, appearing in 14 matches to score 302 runs at a strike rate of 171.59 with one half-century (a top score of 56) while taking eight wickets with the best bowling figures of 2/17.

== International career ==
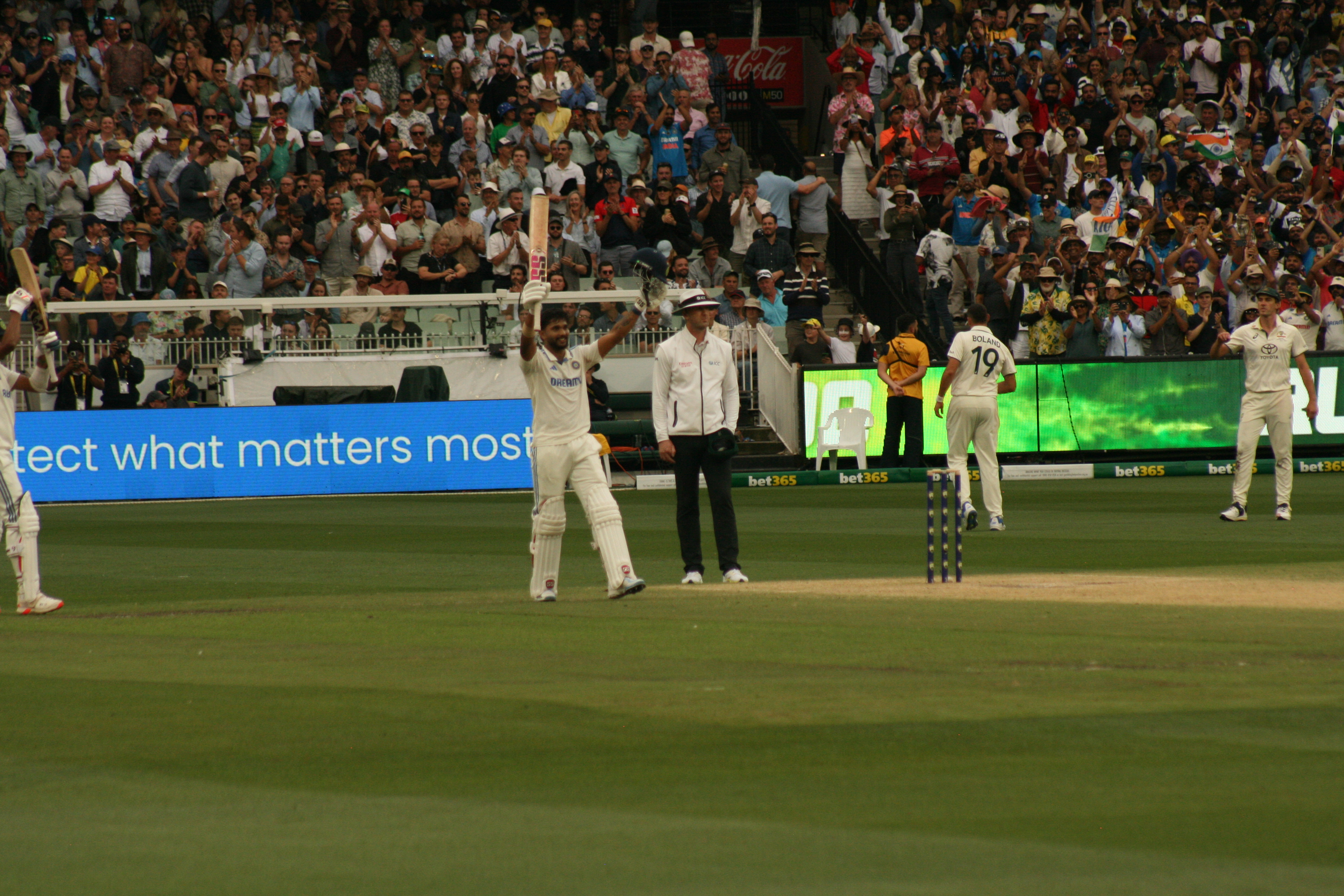
Reddy drives Boland for first Test century at the MCG.

Reddy made his T20I debut against Bangladesh in a 3 match series on 6 October 2024 at Gwalior and scored 16 runs off 15 balls while chasing. He came to the limelight in the 2nd match of the series, held at Delhi on 9 October 2024, where he scored 74 runs off 35 balls with a strike rate of 217. In the same match, he bowled with figures of 2/23, taking 2 wickets including Mahmudullah, and was awarded player of the match. With his performance in the series he was named in the squad of Border–Gavaskar Trophy.

Reddy debuted in Test cricket for India on 22 November 2024, in Perth, during the Border–Gavaskar Trophy series. He was the top scorer with 41 runs in the first innings of this match and scored 38 not out in the 2nd innings. In the second test, he proved to be the standout performer for India in both innings, top scoring in both the innings with 42 runs each. Despite his efforts, India lost the match. At this point he had failed to reach a maiden half century narrowly in all four innings he had played. In the fourth test match of the series, he batted at No. 8 in the first innings with India's score at 196/6 and built a crucial partnership of 128 runs off 285 balls with Washington Sundar, scoring his first international Test century.

In December 2024 (BGT), he scored the first ever century by a No.8 Indian batter in Australia.
