= Tilak Varma =

Indian cricketer (born 2002)

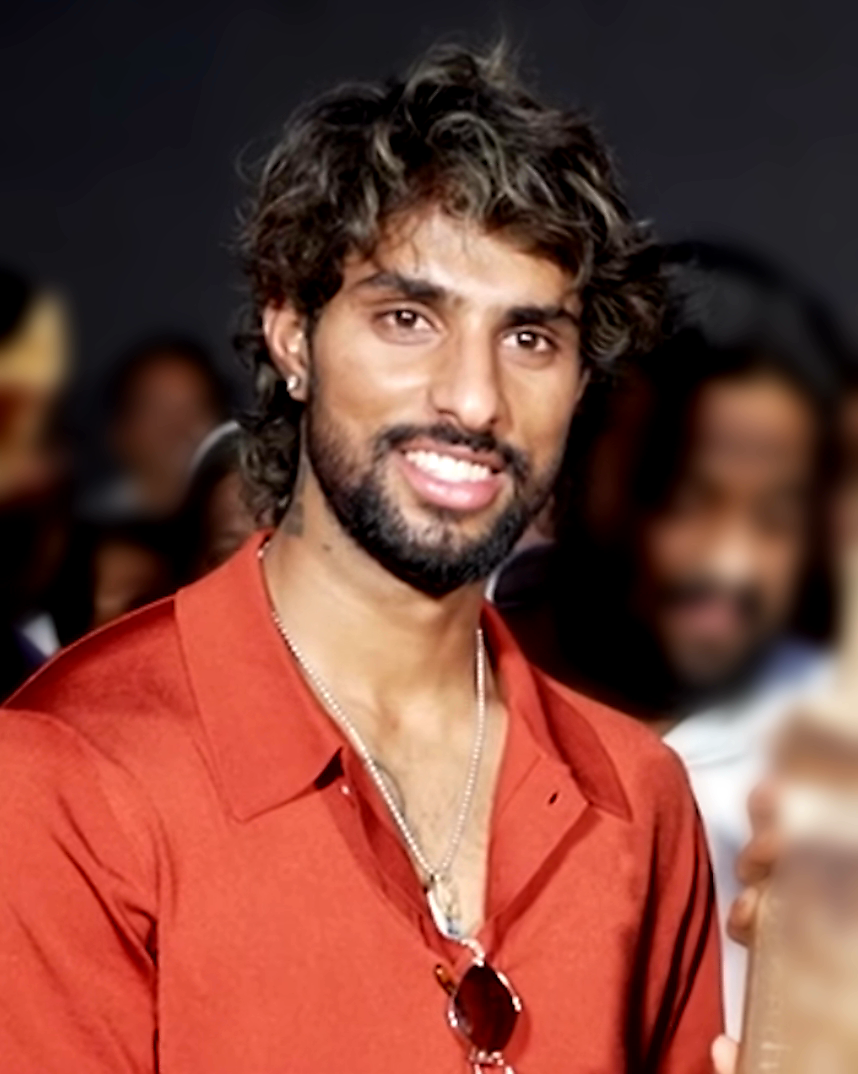
- Tilak in 2026

Personal information
- Full name: Namboori Thakur Tilak Varma
- Born: 8 November 2002 (age 24); Hyderabad, Andhra Pradesh (present–day Telangana), India
- Batting: Left-handed
- Bowling: right-arm off-break
- Role: Batting all-rounder

International information
- National side: India (2023–present)
- ODI debut (cap 252): 15 September 2023 v Bangladesh
- Last ODI: 6 December 2025 v South Africa
- ODI shirt no.: 72
- T20I debut (cap 104): 3 August 2023 v West Indies
- Last T20I: 1 November 2026 v New Zealand
- T20I shirt no.: 72

Domestic team information
- Years: Team
- 2018/19–present: Hyderabad
- 2022–present: Mumbai Indians
- 2025: Hampshire

Career statistics
Competition	ODI	T20I	FC	LA
Matches	5	75	25	52
Runs scored	68	1940	1,828	2,142
Batting average	22.66	43.11	57.12	47.60
100s/50s	0/1	2/11	8/7	6/14
Top score	52	120*	121	156*
Balls bowled	60	63	331	488
Wickets	0	5	8	11
Bowling average	–	12.80	25.50	38.81
5 wickets in innings	–	0	0	0
10 wickets in match	–	0	0	0
Best bowling	–	1/1	3/13	4/23
Catches/stumpings	1/–	53/–	10/–	27/–
Medal record
Men's cricket
Representing India
ICC T20 World Cup
Winner	2026 India & Sri Lanka
ACC Asia Cup
Winner	2023 Pakistan
Winner	2025 UAE
Asian Games
Gold medal – first place	2022 Hangzhou
Gold medal – first place	2026 Aichi-Nagoya
ACC U19 Asia Cup
Winner	2019 Sri Lanka
- Source: Cricinfo, 2 November 2026

Namboori Thakur Tilak Varma (Telugu: [t̪ilak vaɾmaː] నంబూరి తిలక్ వర్మ; born 8 November 2002) is an Indian international cricketer who plays as a left-handed batsman and part-time off spin bowler. He represents Hyderabad in domestic cricket and Mumbai Indians in the Indian Premier League. He is the current vice-captain of the India men's Twenty20 International (T20I) team.

== Early life ==
Tilak Varma was born in Kukatpally neighbourhood of Hyderabad, on 8 November 2002 into a Telugu family. His father Namboori Nagaraju Varma hails from Medchal, Telangana and worked as an electrician in BHEL, whereas his mother Namboori Gayatri Devi hails from Bhimavaram, Andhra Pradesh and is a housewife. He has an elder brother, N Tarun Varma, a national badminton champion.

Varma developed an early interest in cricket and was spotted playing tennis ball cricket by coach Salam Bayash at the age of 11. Bayash trained him at the Legala Cricket Academy in Lingampally, Hyderabad providing transport for the journey of more than 40 kilometres (25 mi) each way until Varma's family moved closer to the academy.

Varma was educated at Crescent Model English School and Bharatiya Vidya Bhavan, BHEL Township Hyderabad, Hyderabad before attending Lepakshi Junior College in the city.

== Domestic career ==
Varma made his first-class debut for Hyderabad in the 2018–19 Ranji Trophy on 30 December 2018 before making his Twenty20 debut for the side in the 2018–19 Syed Mushtaq Ali Trophy in February 2019. He made his List A debut in September 2019 in the 2019–20 Vijay Hazare Trophy.

In December 2019, he was named in India's squad for the 2020 Under-19 Cricket World Cup. Tilak Varma was selected and played for the Indian cricket team at the 19th Asian Games held in Hangzhou, China in 2023, winning the gold medal in the men's T20 format. He was a key part of the squad, which was captained by Ruturaj Gaikwad and secured the gold medal in the final

In 2024 Tilak Varma was selected as captain to lead India 'A' For ACC Men's T20 Emerging Teams Asia Cup held in Oman. Opening batter Abhishek Sharma also part of that squad and he is the vice captain of that team.

In the 2025–26 Duleep Trophy, Tilak was selected as captain to lead South Zone cricket team.

=== Indian Premier League ===
In February 2022, Varma was bought by the Mumbai Indians in the auction for the 2022 Indian Premier League. In the second match of the league, he scored a 33-ball-61 against Rajasthan Royals. In April 2023, he scored 84 runs from 46 balls against Royal Challengers Bangalore in Mumbai's first match of 2023 Indian Premier League. Later in the season he scored 43 from 14 balls in a playoff match against Gujarat Titans. and once again in 2026 he scored 101 runs from 45 ball against same team Gujarat Titans

== International career ==
In July 2023, Varma was called in to the Indian cricket team for the Twenty20 International (T20I) series during the tour of West Indies. He made his international debut on 3 August in the first match of the series, top-scoring for India with 39 runs from 22 deliveries and taking two catches. In the second match of the series he scored his first international half-century, becoming the second youngest Indian to score a fifty in men's T20I cricket. He ended the series as India's highest run scorer and was in the Indian squad for the three-match T20I tour of Ireland which followed.

Varma made his One Day International (ODI) debut in September 2023 against Bangladesh in the 2023 Asia Cup. In November 2024 he scored his maiden T20I century, making 107 not out from 56 balls against South Africa, becoming the second-youngest player to score a T20I century. He scored an unbeaten 120 from 47 balls in the following match.

He played a significant knock of 69 runs in the final of 2025 Asia Cup which earned him the Player of the Match award, where India defeated Pakistan by 5 wickets.

Varma was called up to the India squad in February for the 2026 Men's T20 World Cup following a return from testicular surgery. He played 9 games across the tournament, with a best score of 44 not out against Zimbabwe, which ended with India winning the World Cup.

He led the India A team in Dambulla to win the 2026 Sri Lanka Tri-Nation Series . Tilak Varma was the highest run scorer for the Indian team in the entire tri series by scoring 275 runs in the tri series.

In October 2026, Varma was part of the Indian team that won the gold medal in men's cricket at the 2026 Asian Games, defeating Pakistan by 19 runs in the final. He scored an unbeaten 51 runs off 22 balls.
