= Suryansh Shedge =

Indian cricketer

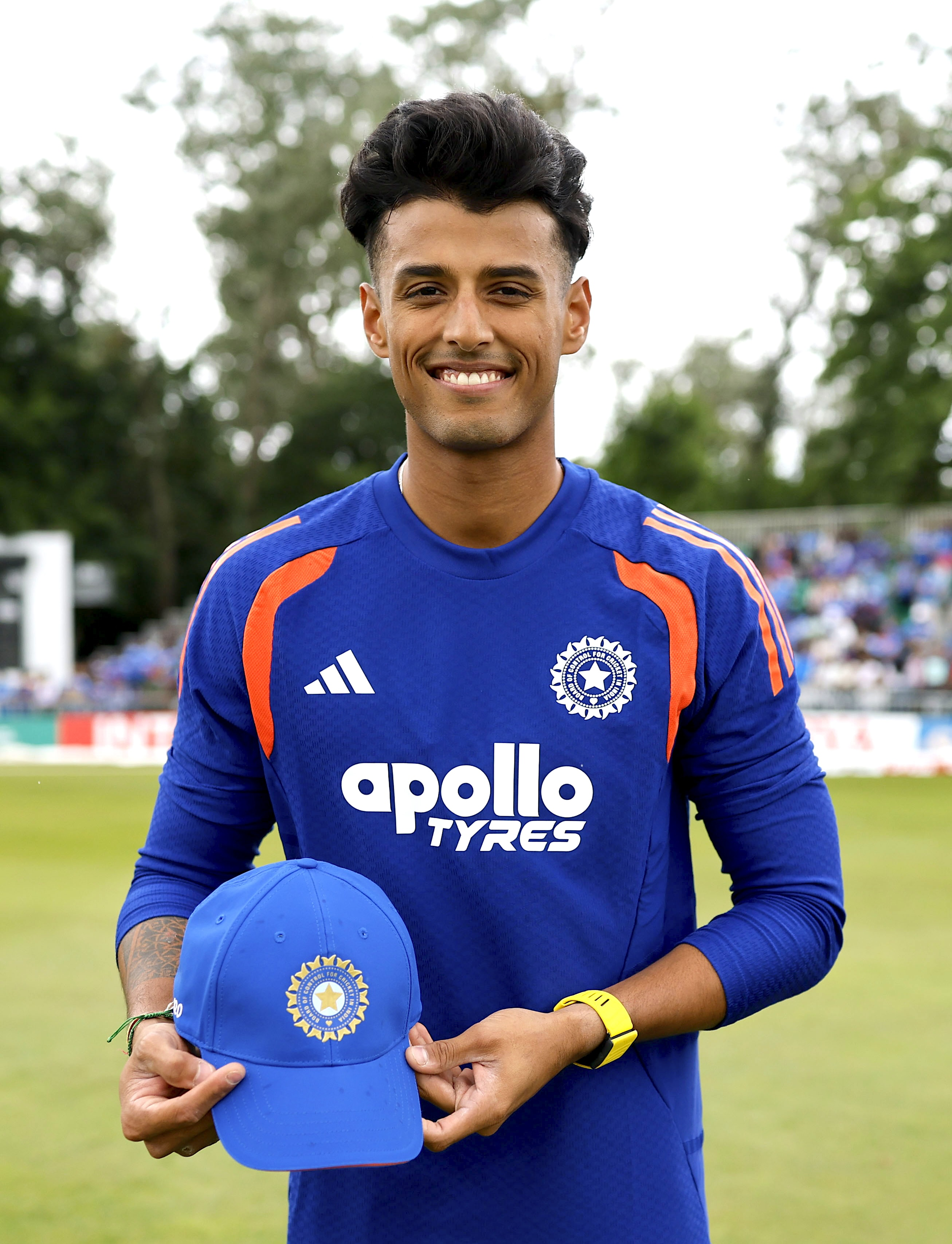
- Shedge after receiving his maiden India cap

Personal information
- Born: 29 January 2003 (age 23); Mumbai, Maharashtra, India
- Batting: Right-handed
- Bowling: Right-arm medium
- Role: Batting all rounder

International information
- National side: India (2026-present)
- T20I debut (cap 120): 28 June 2026 v Ireland
- Last T20I: 26 July 2026 v Zimbabwe

Domestic team information
- Years: Team
- 2024/25–present: Mumbai
- 2025–present: Punjab Kings

Career statistics
Competition	T20I	FC	List A
Matches	3	7	9
Runs scored	8	404	95
Batting average	4.00	50.50	13.57
100s/50s	0/0	0/4	0/0
Top score	7	99	44
Balls bowled	30	48	137
Wickets	0	0	9
Bowling average	–	-	18.11
5 wickets in innings	–	-	0
10 wickets in match	–	-	0
Best bowling	0/15	-	4/35
Catches/stumpings	1/–	5/–	5/–
- Source: ESPNcricinfo, 30 December 2025

Suryansh Shedge (born 29 January 2003) is an Indian cricketer who made his international debut for India in a T20I match against Ireland in June 2026.. He represents Mumbai in domestic cricket and is a batting all-rounder.

He was acquired by the Punjab Kings for the 2025 Indian Premier League season. On 25 March 2025, he made his IPL debut for Punjab Kings in a match against Gujarat Titans.

== Early life ==
Suryansh Shedge was born in Mumbai, India, to Priyadarshini Singh Shedge and Prashant Shedge.

== Domestic career ==
Suryansh Shedge played a key role in Mumbai's win in the 2024-25 Syed Mushtaq Ali Trophy. In the final, Shedge scored 36 runs off 15 balls against Madhya Pradesh. His strike rate in the tournament was 251.92. Shedge showed that he can perform well under pressure and contribute with both bat and ball.

== International career ==
In June 2026, Shedge was named in the Indian squad for the T20I series against Ireland as a replacement for bowling all-rounder Nitish Kumar Reddy, courtesy of standout performances for Mumbai in domestic matches and successful India A outings. After a good season with the Punjab Kings in the IPL. He most recently impressed with the bat and contributed valuable overs and wickets with the ball in the A-Nation ODI Tri Series in Sri Lanka. He is India's Cap No.120, and received his debut cap from Sanju Samson, making his senior international debut in the second match against Ireland in Belfast, and batted at the number 8 position. Shedge remained a part of the Indian T20I squad for the 5-match bilateral series against England, but he only played the last match. He played in the 3rd T20I against Zimbabwe in the 3-match series, which marked his first win, both match and series, with the senior national team.
