= Ishan Kishan =

Indian cricketer (born 1998)

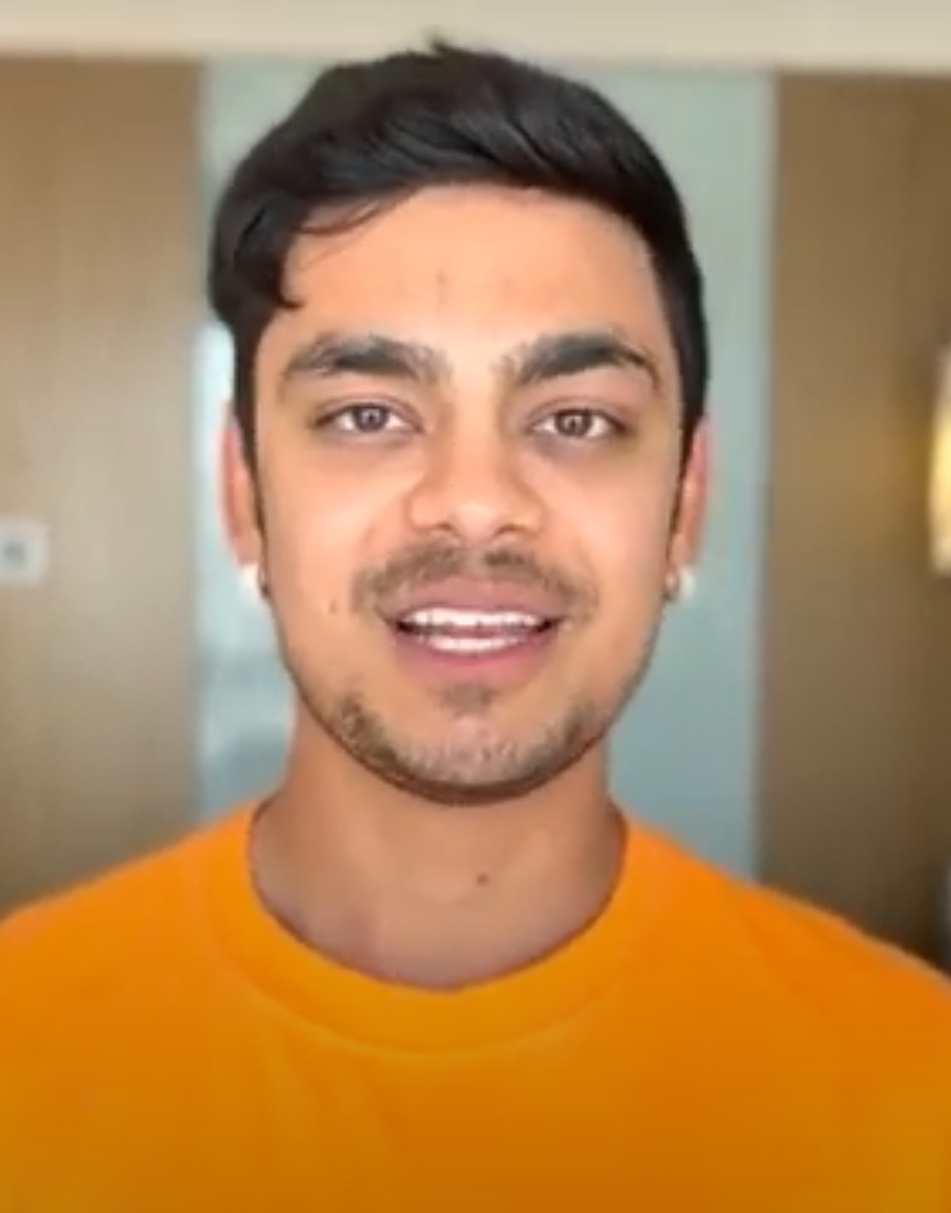
- Kishan in 2022

Personal information
- Full name: Ishan Pranav Kumar Pandey Kishan
- Born: 18 July 1998 (age 28); Patna, Bihar, India
- Height: 5 ft 6 in (168 cm)
- Batting: Left-handed
- Bowling: Leg break, Off-break
- Role: Wicket-keeper-batsman

International information
- National side: India (2021–present)
- Test debut (cap 307): 12 July 2023 v West Indies
- Last Test: 20 July 2023 v West Indies
- ODI debut (cap 235): 18 July 2021 v Sri Lanka
- Last ODI: 19 July 2026 v England
- ODI shirt no.: 32
- T20I debut (cap 84): 14 March 2021 v England
- Last T20I: 17 October 2026 v West Indies
- T20I shirt no.: 32

Domestic team information
- Years: Team
- 2013–present: Jharkhand
- 2016–2017: Gujarat Lions
- 2018–2024: Mumbai Indians
- 2025–present: Sunrisers Hyderabad
- 2025: Nottinghamshire

Career statistics
Competition	Test	ODI	T20I	FC
Matches	2	32	69	67
Runs scored	78	1,107	2,016	4,302
Batting average	78.00	42.57	31.01	42.17
100s/50s	0/1	2/7	1/14	10/20
Top score	52*	210	103	273
Catches/stumpings	5/0	17/3	33/5	138/14
Medal record
Men's cricket
Representing India
ICC Cricket World Cup
Runner-up	2023 India
ICC T20 World Cup
Winner	2026 India & Sri Lanka
ICC World Test Championship
Runner-up	2021–2023
ACC Asia Cup
Winner	2023 Pakistan
Asian Games
Gold medal – first place	2026 Aichi-Nagoya
ICC U19 World Cup
Runner-up	2016 Bangladesh
- Source: cricinfo, 1 November 2026

Ishan Pranav Kumar Pandey Kishan (born 18 July 1998) is an Indian International cricketer who plays for the Indian national cricket team. He plays as for the Sunrisers Hyderabad In the Indian Premier League. He made his international debut in March 2021 against England. He captains Jharkhand in domestic cricket and was stand-in captain for Sunrisers Hyderabad in Indian Premier League in the absence of full-time captain Pat Cummins for the first half of the 2026 season.

In December 2022 he scored 210 runs in 131 balls in an ODI match against Bangladesh, becoming the cricketer with the fastest ODI double century, youngest cricketer to score an ODI double century and the first to convert a maiden ODI century to a double century.

He was the captain of India's squad for the 2016 Under-19 Cricket World Cup. He was a part of the Indian squad which won the 2023 Asia Cup and 2026 T20 World Cup.

== Early life ==
Ishan Kishan was born on 18 July 1998 in Patna, Bihar. He hails from the Goridiha village of Daudnagar block of Aurangabad district, Bihar. His father, Pranav Kumar Pandey is a builder by profession in Patna and his mother name is Suchitra Singh. Due to registration issues between the Bihar Cricket Association and the Board of Control for Cricket in India (BCCI), Ishan started playing for neighbouring state Jharkhand. He occasionally bowls right arm off break and leg break and writes with his right hand.

In 2023, Ishan Kishan took a break from cricket due to mental fatigue and intense pressure, later describing that period as "depressing" after consistently being benched despite good performances. His father confirmed he was very depressed, and the cricketer subsequently turned to spirituality, specifically the Bhagavad Gita, to revive his career and mental well-being.

== Domestic career ==
On 6 November 2016, Kishan scored 273 runs against Delhi in the 2016–17 Ranji Trophy, setting a new record for a player for Jharkhand in the competition. He was the leading run-scorer for Jharkhand in the 2017–18 Ranji Trophy, with 484 runs in six matches and in the 2018–19 Vijay Hazare Trophy, with 405 runs in nine matches.

In October 2018, he was named in the India C squad for the 2018–19 Deodhar Trophy, scoring a century in the tournament's final. In February 2019, in the 2018–19 Syed Mushtaq Ali Trophy, he scored an unbeaten century against Jammu and Kashmir. In the next match, against Manipur, he scored 113 not out to record back-to-back centuries in the tournament.

In August 2019, he was named in India Red's squad for the 2019–20 Duleep Trophy and in October in the India A squad for the same competition. In February 2021, on the opening day of the 2020–21 Vijay Hazare Trophy, Kishan scored 173 runs against Madhya Pradesh, part of a record score of 422.

In October 2024, Ishan Kishan was appointed captain of the Jharkhand cricket team for the 2024–25 Ranji Trophy season following the retirement of Saurabh Tiwary. Kishan, who previously led the team during the 2018–19 season, aims to guide a youthful squad after recent player retirements. He showcased impressive form with a century in the Duleep Trophy, signalling his readiness for the upcoming challenges. The experienced wicketkeeper-batter will be supported by vice-captain Virat Singh as they look to make a significant impact in the tournament.

In August 2025, he was selected to lead the East Zone cricket team as the captain in 2025–26 Duleep Trophy.

In the 2025–26 Syed Mushtaq Ali Trophy, Ishan Kishan captained Jharkhand and led the team to win their first-ever Syed Mushtaq Ali Trophy title by defeating Haryana by 69 runs. Kishan scored 101 runs off 49 balls and shared a 177-run partnership with Kumar Kushagra in 82 balls. With this innings, Kishan became the second player to score a century in a Syed Mushtaq Ali Trophy final and the first captain to achieve the feat. He also finished the tournament as the leading run-scorer, amassing 517 runs at an average of 57.44 and a strike rate of 197.32, and hit the most sixes in the competition (33).

For 2026–27 Duleep Trophy he selected to lead East Zone again, During this Tournament Kishan scored 270 runs in 334 balls in the first innings and 80 runs in second innings during the final against South Zone. Helping East zone to scores 708 runs, their highest total ever in Duleep Trophy and won the tournament.

== Franchise career ==
In 2016, Kishan was bought by Gujarat Lions in the 2016 IPL auction. Lions retained him the following year, their last in the IPL. In 2018, he was bought by the Mumbai Indians in the 2018 auction. He had an impressive first season, where he scored 275 runs at a strike rate of 150.

IPL 2020 proved to be the breakthrough tournament for Kishan as he scored 516 runs, being the highest scorer for Mumbai Indians in 2020 season, with 516 runs from 14 matches and won the award for hitting the most sixes during the season. His most memorable knock was against Royal Challengers Bengaluru where he scored 99 in 58 balls to help the team reach the super over in a high-scoring chase which ended as a defeat for his team.

Ahead of the 2022 IPL, Kishan was bought again by Mumbai for ₹15.25 crore (equivalent to ₹18 crore or US$1.9 million in 2026), making him the second-most expensive Indian player at the auction after Yuvraj Singh. He was again retained by Mumbai Indians for 2023 and 2024 IPL.

In 2024 November, he was bought by Sunrisers Hyderabad in 2025 IPL auction. He scored his first Indian Premier League century in his debut for Sunrisers Hyderabad against Rajasthan Royals in 2025.

In the 2026 season, Kishan served as interim captain of Sunrisers Hyderabad for the first half of the tournament, replacing Pat Cummins due to injury. He led the side until Cummins returned.

== English County Cricket ==
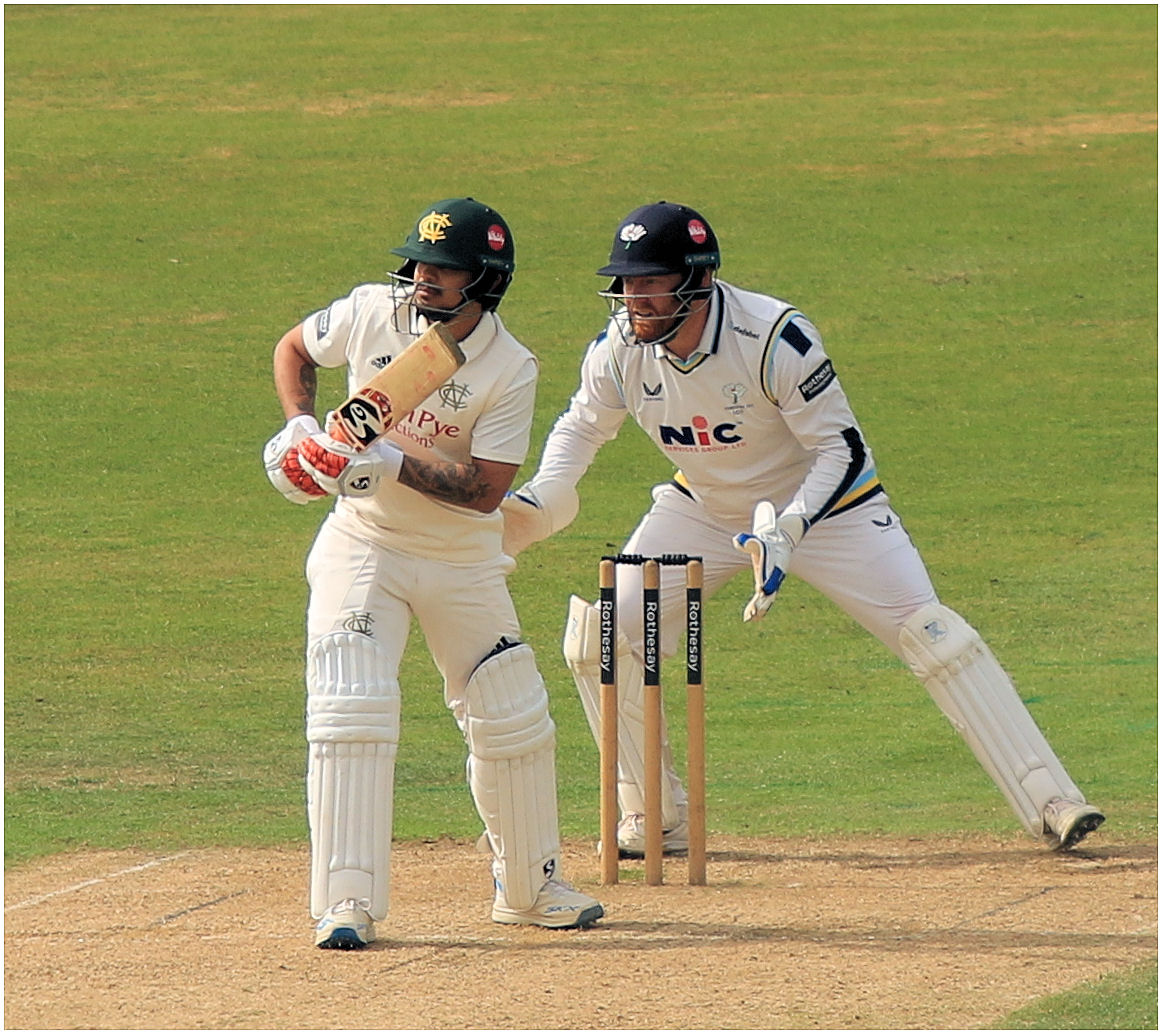
Kishan batting for Nottinghamshire in 2025, with Jonny Bairstow (Yorkshire) keeping wicket

Kishan signed a short-term contract with Nottinghamshire to play two County Championship matches in June 2025. He made his debut against Yorkshire at Trent Bridge on 22 June 2025, scoring 87 off 98 balls, including 12 fours and one six, in his maiden innings for the club. Kishan also took a catch off his first ball behind the stumps for Nottinghamshire, holding onto an edge off the bat of Adam Lyth off the bowling of Pakistan seamer Mohammad Abbas.

== International career ==
In February 2021, Ishan was named in India's Twenty20 International (T20I) squad for their home series against England. It was his maiden international call-up and he went on to make his debut on 14 March 2021, scoring 56 from 32 balls. He won the player of the match award.

In June 2021, he was named in India's One Day International (ODI) and T20I squads for their tour of Sri Lanka. He made his ODI debut on the tour in July, scoring 59 from 42 balls. In September he was named in India's squad for the 2021 ICC Men's T20 World Cup.

In October 2022, Kishan scored his then-ODI career-highest score of 93 runs in the second of three ODIs against the touring South Africans before going on to become the youngest―aged 24 years and 145 days―and the fastest player to score a double century in an ODI in December during India's tour of Bangladesh. He scored 210 runs from 131 balls, reaching the 200-run mark in 126 deliveries to beat Chris Gayle's record of 138 balls, adding 290 runs for the second wicket with Virat Kohli. He also became the first player to convert a maiden ODI century into a double century, and the fourth Indian player to score a double century in an ODI.

In September 2023, Kishan was selected in India's squad for 50-over World Cup. He was picked as the replacement to the regular opener Shubman Gill in the first match against Australia, but could not score a run. However, in the second game against Afghanistan, he scored 47 runs off 47 balls.

After an absence of over two years from the national team, Kishan made his return to the Indian team during the first T20I against New Zealand at Nagpur in January 2026. Playing his first match in 785 days, he scored a boundary on the first delivery he faced before being dismissed for eight runs.

On 23 January 2026, Kishan scored 76 runs off 32 balls in the second T20I against New Zealand at Raipur. During the innings, he reached his half-century in 21 deliveries, setting a new record for the second fastest T20I fifty by an Indian batter against New Zealand. His performance helped India successfully chase a target of 209 in 15.2 overs, securing a 2–0 lead in the series.

On 31 January 2026, Kishan smashed his maiden T20I century in the fifth T20I against New Zealand. He scored 103 runs off 43 balls.

On 12 February 2026, Kishan became the first Indian wicket-keeper to score a half-century in T20 World Cup history, scoring 61 runs off 24 balls against Namibia at the Arun Jaitley Stadium in New Delhi. His innings, which included six fours and five sixes, helped India achieve a 93-run victory, their largest by runs in the tournament's history.

On 15 February 2026, Kishan scored 77 runs off just 40 deliveries in a T20 World Cup match against Pakistan. His destructive knock helped India score 175/7 on a difficult Colombo pitch batting first and they eventually beat Pakistan by 61 runs. Kishan subsequently won the player of the match for his match-winning innings.
