= List of India Twenty20 International cricket records =

A Twenty20 International (T20I) is a form of cricket, played between two of the international members of the International Cricket Council (ICC), in which each team faces a maximum of twenty overs. The matches have top-class status and are the highest T20 standard. The game is played under the rules of Twenty20 cricket. The first Twenty20 International match between two men's sides was played on 17 February 2005, involving Australia and New Zealand. Wisden Cricketers' Almanack reported that "neither side took the game especially seriously", and it was noted by Cricinfo that but for a large score for Ricky Ponting, "the concept would have shuddered". However, Ponting himself said "if it does become an international game then I'm sure the novelty won't be there all the time". This is a list of India Cricket team's Twenty20 International records. It is based on the List of Twenty20 International records, but concentrates solely on records dealing with the Indian cricket team. India played its first Twenty20 game against South Africa in December 2006, and these records date from that game.

== Key ==
The top five records are listed for each category, except for the team wins, losses, draws and ties, all round records and the partnership records. Tied records for fifth place are also included. Explanations of the general symbols and cricketing terms used in the list are given below. Specific details are provided in each category where appropriate. All records include matches played for India only.

Key
Symbol	Meaning
†	Player or umpire is currently active in T20I cricket
‡	Event took place during a ICC Men's T20 World Cup
*	Player remained not out or partnership remained unbroken
♠	Twenty20 International cricket record
Date	Starting date of the match
Innings	Number of innings played
Matches	Number of matches played
Opposition	The team India was playing against
Period	The time period when the player was active in ODI cricket
Player	The player involved in the record
Venue	Twenty20 International cricket ground where the match was played

== Team records ==
=== Overall record ===
Matches	Won	Lost	Tied	Tie+Win	Tie+Loss	NR	Win %
303	201	85	1	6	0	10	70.82
Last Updated: 1 November 2026

=== Head to head record ===
Won more matches than lost
All matches tied/no result
Won equal matches to lost
Lost more matches than won

Opponent	Matches	Won	Lost	Tied	Tie+Win	Tie+Loss	No Result	% Won	First	Last
ICC Full Members
Afghanistan	12	10	0	0	1	0	1	95.45	2010	2026
Australia	37	22	12	0	0	0	3	64.70	2007	2025
Bangladesh	18	17	1	0	0	0	0	94.44	2009	2025
England	35	18	16	0	0	0	1	52.94	2007	2026
Ireland	10	8	2	0	0	0	0	80.00	2009	2026
New Zealand	36	20	13	1	2	0	0	59.72	2007	2026
Pakistan	18	14	3	0	1	0	0	80.55	2007	2026
South Africa	36	21	14	0	0	0	1	60.00	2006	2026
Sri Lanka	34	22	9	0	2	0	1	69.69	2009	2026
West Indies	36	22	12	0	0	0	2	64.70	2009	2026
Zimbabwe	17	14	3	0	0	0	0	82.35	2010	2026
ICC Associate members
Hong Kong	1	1	0	0	0	0	0	100.00	2022	2022
Japan	1	1	0	0	0	0	0	100.00	2026	2026
Namibia	2	2	0	0	0	0	0	100.00	2021	2026
Nepal	1	1	0	0	0	0	0	100.00	2023	2023
Netherlands	2	2	0	0	0	0	0	100.00	2022	2026
Oman	1	1	0	0	0	0	0	100.00	2025	2025
Scotland	2	1	0	0	0	0	1	50.00	2007	2021
United Arab Emirates	2	2	0	0	0	0	0	100.00	2016	2025
United States	2	2	0	0	0	0	0	100.00	2024	2026
Total	303	201	85	1	6	0	10	70.82	2006	2026
Statistics are correct as of India v New Zealand at Seddon Park, Hamilton, 1 November 2026

=== First bilateral T20I series wins ===
Opponent	Year of first Home win	Year of first Away win
Afghanistan	2024	2026
Australia	2007	2016
Bangladesh	2019	YTP
England	2017	2018
Ireland	YTP	2018
Japan	YTP	2026
New Zealand	2017	2020
Pakistan	–	YTP
South Africa	2022	2006
Sri Lanka	2016	2008
West Indies	2018	2011
Zimbabwe	YTP	2010
Last Updated: 22 September 2026

=== First T20I match wins ===
Opponent	Home		Away / Neutral	
Opponent	Venue	Year	Venue	Year
Afghanistan	Inderjit Singh Bindra Stadium, Mohali, India	2024	Darren Sammy National Cricket Stadium, Gros Islet, Saint Lucia	2010
Australia	Wankhede Stadium, Mumbai, India	2007	Sahara Stadium, Kingsmead, Durban, South Africa	2007
Bangladesh	M. Chinnaswamy Stadium, Bangalore, India	2016	Trent Bridge, Nottingham, England	2009
England	Maharashtra Cricket Association Stadium, Pune, India	2012	Sahara Stadium, Kingsmead, Durban, South Africa	2007
Hong Kong	YTP		Dubai International Cricket Stadium, Dubai, UAE	2022
Ireland	YTP		Trent Bridge, Nottingham, England	2009
Japan	YTP		Sano International Cricket Ground, Sano, Japan	2026
Namibia	Arun Jaitley Stadium, New Delhi, India	2026	Dubai International Cricket Stadium, Dubai, UAE	2021
Netherlands	Narendra Modi Stadium, Ahmedabad, India	2026	Sydney Cricket Ground, Sydney, Australia	2022
Nepal	YTP		Zhejiang University of Technology Cricket Field, Hangzhou, China	2023
New Zealand	Arun Jaitley Stadium, New Delhi, India	2017	Eden Park, Auckland, New Zealand	2019
Oman	YTP		Sheikh Zayed Cricket Stadium, Abu Dhabi, UAE	2025
Pakistan	Sardar Patel Stadium, Ahmedabad, India	2012	New Wanderers Stadium, Johannesburg, South Africa	2007
Scotland	YTP		Dubai International Cricket Stadium, UAE	2021
South Africa	Punjab Cricket Association Stadium, Mohali, India	2019	New Wanderers Stadium, Johannesburg, South Africa	2006
Sri Lanka	Punjab Cricket Association Stadium, Mohali, India	2009	Ranasinghe Premadasa Stadium, Colombo, Sri Lanka	2009
United Arab Emirates	YTP		Sher-e-Bangla National Cricket Stadium, Mirpur, Bangladesh	2016
United States	Wankhede Stadium, Mumbai, India	2026	Nassau County International Cricket Stadium, New York, United States	2024
West Indies	Eden Gardens, Kolkata, India	2018	Queen's Park Oval, Port of Spain, Trinidad and Tobago	2011
Zimbabwe	M. A. Chidambaram Stadium, Chennai, India	2026	Harare Sports Club, Harare, Zimbabwe	2010
Last Updated: 26 February 2026

=== Winning every match in a Tournament ===
Tournament	Matches	Host	Season
Asia Cup	5	Bangladesh	2016
World Cup	8	United States and West Indies	2024
Asia Cup	7	United Arab Emirates	2025
Asian Games	3	Japan	2026
Last updated: 3 October 2026

=== Winning every match in a series ===
In a bilateral series winning all matches is referred to as whitewash. Only series with more than one match are considered. India have recorded 17 such series victories.

Opposition	Matches	Host	Season
Zimbabwe	2	Zimbabwe	2010
Australia	3	Australia	2016
Sri Lanka	3	India	2017
Ireland	2	Ireland	2018
West Indies	3	India	2018
West Indies	3	(United States) USA / Guyana	2019
Sri Lanka	3	India	2020
New Zealand	5	New Zealand	2020
New Zealand	3	India	2022
West Indies	3	India	2022
Sri Lanka	3	India	2022
Ireland	2	Ireland	2022
Ireland	2	Ireland	2023
Afghanistan	3	India	2024
Sri Lanka	3	Sri Lanka	2024
Bangladesh	3	India	2024
Zimbabwe	3	Zimbabwe	2026
Afghanistan	3	Afghanistan	2026
Last updated: 18 September 2026

=== Losing every match in a series ===
Opposition	Matches	Host	Season
New Zealand	2	New Zealand	2008/09
New Zealand	2	India	2012
Australia	2	India	2018/19
Ireland	2	Ireland	2026
Last updated: 18 September 2026

=== Team scoring records ===
==== Most runs in an innings ====
Rank	Score	Opposition	Venue	Date
1	297/6	Bangladesh	Rajiv Gandhi International Cricket Stadium, Hyderabad, India	12 October 2024
2	283/1	South Africa	Wanderers Stadium, Johannesburg, South Africa	15 November 2024
3	271/5	New Zealand	Greenfield International Stadium, Thiruvananthapuram, India	31 January 2026
4	260/5	Sri Lanka	Holkar Stadium, Indore, India	22 December 2017
5	256/4	Zimbabwe	M. A. Chidambaram Stadium, Chennai, India	26 February 2026‡
Last Updated: 26 February 2026

==== Fewest runs in an innings ====
Rank	Score	Opposition	Venue	Date
1	74	Australia	Melbourne Cricket Ground, Melbourne, Australia	1 February 2008
2	76	England	Trent Bridge, Nottingham, England	7 July 2026
3	79	New Zealand	Vidarbha Cricket Association Stadium, Nagpur, India	15 March 2016 ‡
4	81/8	Sri Lanka	R. Premadasa Stadium, Colombo, Sri Lanka	29 July 2021
5	92	South Africa	Barabati Stadium, Cuttack, India	5 October 2015
Last Updated: 7 July 2026

==== Most runs conceded in an innings ====
Rank	Score	Opposition	Venue	Date
1	259/7	New Zealand	Eden Park, Auckland, New Zealand	30 October 2026
2	257/3	England	Rose Bowl, Southampton, England	11 July 2026
3	252/4	West Indies	JSCA International Stadium Complex, Ranchi, India	9 October 2026
4	247/3	West Indies	Rajiv Gandhi International Cricket Stadium, Indore, India	14 October 2026
5	246/7	England	Wankhede Stadium, Mumbai, India	5 March 2026‡
Last Updated: 30 October 2026

==== Fewest runs conceded in an innings ====
Rank	Score	Opposition	Venue	Date
1	45	Sri Lanka	Kōrogi Sports Park, Nisshin, Japan	1 October 2026 ‡
2	57	United Arab Emirates	Dubai International Cricket Stadium, Dubai, UAE	10 September 2025
3	66	New Zealand	Narendra Modi Stadium, Ahmedabad, India	1 February 2023
4	70	Ireland	Malahide Cricket Club Ground, Dublin, Ireland	29 June 2018
5	74	South Africa	Barabati Stadium, Cuttack, India	9 December 2025
Last Updated: 1 October 2026

==== Most runs aggregate in a match ====
Rank	Aggregate	Scores	Venue	Date
1	501/9	West Indies (252/4) v India (249/5)	JSCA International Stadium Complex, Ranchi, India	9 October 2026
2	499/14	India (253/7) v England (246/7)	Wankhede Stadium, Mumbai, India	5 March 2026‡
3	496/15	India (271/5) v New Zealand (225/10)	Greenfield International Stadium, Thiruvananthapuram, India	31 January 2026
4	489/10	West Indies (245/6) v India (244/4)	Central Broward Park, Lauderhill, United States	27 August 2016
5	470/12	West Indies (247/3) v India (223)	Rajiv Gandhi International Cricket Stadium, Hyderabad, India	14 October 2026
Last Updated: 14 October 2026

==== Fewest runs aggregate in a match ====
Rank	Aggregate	Scores	Venue	Date
1	62/7	India (32/4) v Japan (30/3)	Sano International Cricket Ground, Sano, Japan	22 September 2026
2	117/11	United Arab Emirates (57/10) v India (60/1)	Dubai International Cricket Stadium, Dubai, UAE	10 September 2025
3	128/11	India (67/5) v New Zealand (61/6)	Greenfield International Stadium, Thiruvananthapuram, India	7 November 2017
4	149/11	India (74) v Australia (75/1)	Melbourne Cricket Ground, Melbourne, Australia	1 February 2008
5	163/11	India (81/8) v Sri Lanka (82/3)	R. Premadasa Stadium, Colombo, Sri Lanka	29 July 2021
Last Updated: 22 September 2026

=== Result records ===
A T20I match is won when one side has scored more runs than the runs scored by the opposing side during their innings. If both sides have completed both their allocated innings and the side that fielded last has the higher aggregate of runs, it is known as a win by runs. This indicates the number of runs that they had scored more than the opposing side. If the side batting last wins the match, it is known as a win by wickets, indicating the number of wickets that were still to fall.

==== Greatest win margins (by runs) ====
Rank	Margin	Opposition	Venue	Date
1	168 runs	New Zealand	Narendra Modi Stadium, Ahmedabad, India	1 February 2023
2	150 runs	England	Wankhede Stadium, Mumbai, India	2 February 2025
3	143 runs	Ireland	Malahide Cricket Club Ground, Dublin, Ireland	29 June 2018
4	135 runs	South Africa	Wanderers Stadium, Johannesburg, South Africa	15 November 2024
5	133 runs	Bangladesh	Rajiv Gandhi International Cricket Stadium, Hyderabad, India	12 October 2024
Last Updated: 02 February 2025

==== Greatest win margins (by balls remaining) ====
Rank	Balls remaining	Margin	Opposition	Venue	Date
1	93	9 wickets	United Arab Emirates	Dubai International Cricket Stadium, Dubai, UAE	10 September 2025
2	81	8 wickets	Scotland	Dubai International Cricket Stadium, Dubai, UAE	5 November 2021
3	64	9 wickets	Bangladesh	Zhejiang University of Technology Cricket Field, Hangzhou, China	6 October 2023‡
4	60	8 wickets	New Zealand	Assam Cricket Association Stadium, Guwahati, India	25 January 2026
5	59	9 wickets	United Arab Emirates	Sher-e-Bangla National Cricket Stadium, Mirpur, Bangladesh	3 March 2016
Last Updated: 25 January 2026

==== Greatest win margins (by wickets) ====
Rank	Margin	Opposition	Venue	Date
1	10 wickets	Zimbabwe	Harare Sports Club, Harare, Zimbabwe	20 June 2016
1	10 wickets	Zimbabwe	Harare Sports Club, Harare, Zimbabwe	13 July 2024
3	9 wickets	Sri Lanka	ACA–VDCA Cricket Stadium, Visakhapatnam, India	14 February 2016
3	9 wickets	United Arab Emirates	Sher-e-Bangla National Cricket Stadium, Mirpur, Bangladesh	3 March 2016
3	9 wickets	Australia	JSCA International Stadium Complex, Ranchi, India	7 October 2017
3	9 wickets	Namibia	Dubai International Cricket Stadium, Dubai, UAE	8 November 2021 ‡
3	9 wickets	West Indies	Central Broward Park, Lauderhill, United States	12 August 2023
3	9 wickets	Bangladesh	Zhejiang University of Technology Cricket Field, Hangzhou, China	6 October 2023
3	9 wickets	United Arab Emirates	Dubai International Cricket Stadium, Dubai, UAE	10 September 2025
Last updated: 10 September 2025

==== Highest successful run chases ====
Rank	Score	Target	Opposition	Venue	Date
1	230/6	226	New Zealand	Hagley Oval, Christchurch, New Zealand	22 October 2026
2	209/8	209	Australia	ACA–VDCA Cricket Stadium, Visakhapatnam, India	23 November 2023
2	209/3	209	New Zealand	Shaheed Veer Narayan Singh International Cricket Stadium, Raipur, India	23 January 2026
4	209/4	208	West Indies	Rajiv Gandhi International Cricket Stadium, Hyderabad, India	6 December 2019
5	211/4	207	Sri Lanka	Inderjit Singh Bindra Stadium, Mohali, India	12 December 2009
Last Updated: 22 October 2026

==== Narrowest win margins (by runs) ====
Rank	Margin	Opposition	Venue	Date
1	1 Run	South Africa	R. Premadasa Stadium, Colombo, Sri Lanka	2 October 2012 ‡
1	1 Run	Bangladesh	M. Chinnaswamy Stadium, Bangalore, India	23 March 2016 ‡
3	2 Runs	Sri Lanka	Wankhede Stadium, Mumbai, India	3 January 2023
3	2 Runs	Ireland	Malahide Cricket Club Ground, Dublin, Ireland	18 August 2023
3	2 Runs	Japan	Sano International Cricket Ground, Sano, Japan	22 September 2026
Last Updated: 22 September 2026

==== Narrowest win margins (by balls remaining) ====
Rank	Balls remaining	Margin	Opposition	Venue	Date
1	0	7 wickets	Australia	Sydney Cricket Ground, Sydney, Australia	31 January 2016
1	0	4 wickets	Bangladesh	R. Premadasa Stadium, Colombo, Sri Lanka	18 March 2018
1	0	6 wickets	West Indies	M. A. Chidambaram Stadium, Chennai, India	11 November 2018
1	0	4 wickets	Pakistan	Melbourne Cricket Ground, Melbourne, Australia	23 October 2022 ‡
5	1	6 wickets	South Africa	Wanderers Stadium, Johannesburg, South Africa	1 December 2006
5	1	6 wickets	Australia	Rajiv Gandhi International Cricket Stadium, Hyderabad, India	25 September 2022
5	1	6 wickets	New Zealand	Ekana Cricket Stadium, Lucknow, India	29 January 2023
5	1	2 wickets	Australia	ACA–VDCA Cricket Stadium, Visakhapatnam, India	23 November 2023
Last Updated: 23 November 2023

==== Narrowest win margins (by wickets) ====
Rank	Margin	Opposition	Venue	Date
1	2 wickets	Australia	ACA–VDCA Cricket Stadium, Visakhapatnam, India	23 November 2023
1	2 wickets	England	M.A. Chidambaram Stadium, Chennai, India	25 January 2025
2	3 wickets	Sri Lanka	R. Premadasa Stadium, Colombo, Sri Lanka	10 February 2009
3	4 wickets	Bangladesh	R. Premadasa Stadium, Colombo, Sri Lanka	18 March 2018
3	4 wickets	West Indies	Central Broward Park, Lauderhill, United States	3 August 2019
3	4 wickets	Pakistan	Melbourne Cricket Ground, Melbourne, Australia	23 October 2022
Last Updated: 25 January 2025

==== Greatest loss margins (by runs) ====
Rank	Margin	Opposition	Venue	Date
1	125 runs	England	Trent Bridge, Nottingham, England	7 July 2026
2	80 runs	New Zealand	Wellington Regional Stadium, Wellington, New Zealand	6 February 2019
3	76 runs	South Africa	Narendra Modi Stadium, Ahmedabad, India	22 February 2026 ‡
4	56 runs	England	Rose Bowl, Southampton, England	11 July 2026
5	51 runs	South Africa	Maharaja Yadavindra Singh International Cricket Stadium, New Chandigarh, India	11 December 2025
Last Updated: 11 July 2026

==== Greatest loss margins (by balls remaining) ====
Rank	Balls remaining	Margin	Opposition	Venue	Date
1	52	9 wickets	Australia	Melbourne Cricket Ground, Melbourne, Australia	1 February 2008
2	40	4 wickets	Australia	Melbourne Cricket Ground, Melbourne, Australia	31 October 2025
3	37	9 wickets	England	Bristol County Ground, Bristol, England	9 July 2026
4	33	7 wickets	Sri Lanka	R. Premadasa Stadium, Colombo, Sri Lanka	29 July 2021
4	33	8 wickets	New Zealand	Dubai International Cricket Stadium, Dubai, UAE	31 October 2021 ‡
Last Updated: 10 July 2026

==== Greatest loss margins (by wickets) ====
Rank	Margins	Opposition	Most recent venue	Date
1	10 wickets	Pakistan	Dubai International Cricket Stadium, Dubai, UAE	24 October 2021‡
1	10 wickets	England	Adelaide Oval, Adelaide, Australia	10 November 2022‡
3	9 wickets	England	Bristol County Ground, Bristol, England	9 July 2026
3	9 wickets	Australia	Melbourne Cricket Ground, Melbourne, Australia	1 February 2008
3	9 wickets	Australia	R. Premadasa Stadium, Colombo, Sri Lanka	28 September 2012 ‡
3	9 wickets	West Indies	Sabina Park, Kingston, Jamaica	9 July 2017
3	9 wickets	South Africa	M. Chinnaswamy Stadium, Bangalore, India	22 September 2019
Last Updated: 10 July 2026

==== Narrowest loss margins (by runs) ====
Rank	Margin	Opposition	Venue	Date
1	1 run	New Zealand	M. A. Chidambaram Stadium, Chennai, India	11 September 2012
1	1 run	West Indies	Central Broward Park, Lauderhill, United States	27 August 2016
1	1 run	Ireland	Stormont Cricket Ground, Belfast, Ireland	28 June 2026
4	2 runs	Zimbabwe	Harare Sports Club, Harare, Zimbabwe	18 June 2016
5	3 runs	England	Lord's, London, England	14 June 2009 ‡
5	3 runs	England	Edgbaston Cricket Ground, Birmingham, England	7 September 2014
Last Updated: 28 June 2026

==== Narrowest loss margins (by balls remaining) ====
Rank	Balls remaining	Margin	Opposition	Venue	Date
1	0	5 wickets	New Zealand	Wellington Regional Stadium, Wellington, New Zealand	27 February 2009
1	0	5 wickets	Sri Lanka	Darren Sammy National Cricket Stadium, Gros Islet, Saint Lucia	11 May 2010 ‡
1	0	6 wickets	England	Wankhede Stadium, Mumbai, India	22 December 2012
1	0	3 wickets	Australia	ACA–VDCA Cricket Stadium, Visakhapatnam, India	24 February 2019
1	0	5 wickets	Australia	Assam Cricket Association Stadium, Guwahati, India	28 November 2023
Last Updated: 28 November 2023

==== Narrowest loss margins (by wickets) ====
Rank	Margin	Opposition	Venue	Date
1	2 wickets	West Indies	Providence Stadium, Georgetown, Guyana	6 August 2023
2	3 wickets	Australia	ACA–VDCA Cricket Stadium, Visakhapatnam, India	24 February 2019
2	3 wickets	South Africa	St George's Park Cricket Ground, Gqeberha, South Africa	10 November 2024
4	4 wickets	Sri Lanka	R. Premadasa Stadium, Colombo, Sri Lanka	28 July 2021
4	4 wickets	South Africa	Barabati Stadium, Cuttack, India	12 June 2022
4	4 wickets	Australia	Inderjit Singh Bindra Stadium, Mohali, India	20 September 2022
4	4 wickets	Australia	Melbourne Cricket Ground, Melbourne, Australia	31 October 2025
4	4 wickets	England	Old Trafford Cricket Ground, Manchester, England	4 July 2026
Last Updated: 4 July 2026

==== Tied matches ====
A tie can occur when the scores of both teams are equal at the conclusion of play, provided that the side batting last has completed their innings. There have been 44 ties in T20Is history with India involved in 7 such games.

Opposition	Venue	Date
Pakistan	Kingsmead Cricket Ground, Durban, South Africa	14 September 2007 ‡
New Zealand	Seddon Park, Hamilton, New Zealand	29 January 2020
New Zealand	Wellington Regional Stadium, Wellington, New Zealand	31 January 2020
New Zealand	McLean Park, Napier, New Zealand	22 November 2022
Afghanistan	M. Chinnaswamy Stadium, Bengaluru, India	17 January 2024
Sri Lanka	Pallekele International Cricket Stadium, Pallekele, Sri Lanka	30 July 2024
Sri Lanka	Dubai International Cricket Stadium, Dubai, UAE	26 September 2025
Last updated: 26 September 2025

== Batting records ==
=== Most career runs ===
A run is the basic means of scoring in cricket. A run is scored when the batsman hits the ball with his bat and with his partner runs the length of 22 yards (20 m) of the pitch.

Rank	Runs	Player	Matches	Innings	Period
1	4,231	Rohit Sharma	159	151	2007–2024
2	4,188	Virat Kohli	125	117	2010–2024
3	3,272	Suryakumar Yadav†	113	107	2021–2026
4	2,288	Hardik Pandya†	138	109	2016–2026
5	2,268	Abhishek Sharma†	72	71	2024–2026
6	2,265	KL Rahul†	72	68	2016–2022
7	2,016	Ishan Kishan†	69	69	2021–2026
8	1,940	Tilak Varma†	75	71	2023–2026
9	1,842	Sanju Samson†	82	74	2015–2026
10	1,820	Shreyas Iyer†	77	73	2017–2026
Last Updated: 01 November 2026

=== Fastest runs getter ===
Runs	Batsman	Innings	Record Date	Reference
1,000	Virat Kohli	27	2 October 2015	
2,000	Virat Kohli	56	3 July 2018	
2,000	Suryakumar Yadav	56	12 December 2023	
3,000	Virat Kohli	81	14 March 2021	
4,000	Virat Kohli	107	10 November 2022	

=== Most runs in each batting position ===
Batting position	Batsman	Innings	Runs	Average	Career Span	Ref
Opener	Rohit Sharma	124	3,750	32.60	2009–2024	
Number 3	Virat Kohli	80	3,076	53.96	2011–2024	
Number 4	Suryakumar Yadav†	63	2,122	40.80	2021–2026	
Number 5	Hardik Pandya†	52	1,258	32.25	2016–2026	
Number 6	Hardik Pandya†	32	675	29.34	2016–2026	
Number 7	Axar Patel†	29	354	22.12	2015–2026	
Number 8	Axar Patel†	23	162	10.12	2015–2026	
Number 9	Arshdeep Singh†	21	74	5.28	2022–2026	
Number 10	Prince Yadav†	2	31	-	2026–2026	
Number 11	Mohammed Siraj†	2	12	12.00	2017–2024	
Last Updated: 30 October 2026

=== Most runs against each team ===
Opposition	Runs	Batsman	Matches	Innings	Career Span	Ref
Afghanistan	229	Abhishek Sharma†	3	3	2024–2026	
Australia	794	Virat Kohli	23	22	2012–2024	
Bangladesh	477	Rohit Sharma	13	13	2009–2024	
England	648	Virat Kohli	21	21	2011–2024	
Hong Kong	68	Suryakumar Yadav†	1	1	2022–2022	
Ireland	201	Rohit Sharma	4	4	2009–2024	
Japan	16	Shreyas Iyer†	1	1	2026–2026	
Namibia	61	Ishan Kishan†	1	1	2026–2026	
Nepal	100	Yashasvi Jaiswal†	1	1	2023–2023	
Netherlands	85	Suryakumar Yadav†	2	2	2022–2026	
New Zealand	526	Suryakumar Yadav†	14	14	2021–2026	
Oman	56	Sanju Samson	1	1	2025–2025	
Pakistan	492	Virat Kohli	11	11	2012–2024	
Scotland	50	KL Rahul†	1	1	2021–2021	
Sri Lanka	411	Rohit Sharma	19	17	2009–2022	
United Arab Emirates	39	Rohit Sharma	1	1	2016–2016	
South Africa	497	Tilak Varma†	11	11	2023–2026	
United States	134	Suryakumar Yadav†	2	2	2024–2026	
West Indies	693	Rohit Sharma	22	22	2009–2022	
Zimbabwe	190	Abhishek Sharma†	9	8	2024–2026	
Last updated: 22 September 2026

=== Highest individual score ===
Rank	Runs	Player	Opposition	Venue	Date
1	135	Abhishek Sharma	England	Wankhede Stadium, Mumbai, India	2 February 2025
2	126*	Shubman Gill	New Zealand	Narendra Modi Stadium, Ahmedabad, India	1 February 2023
3	123*	Ruturaj Gaikwad	Australia	Assam Cricket Association Stadium, Guwahati, India	28 November 2023
4	122*	Virat Kohli	Afghanistan	Dubai International Cricket Stadium, Dubai, UAE	8 September 2022
5	121*	Rohit Sharma	Afghanistan	M. Chinnaswamy Stadium, Bangalore, India	17 January 2024
Last Updated: 02 February 2025

=== Highest individual score in each batting position ===
Batting position	Batsman	Score	Opposition	Ground	Date	Ref
Opener	Abhishek Sharma	135	England	Wankhede Stadium, Mumbai, India	2 February 2025	
Number 3	Tilak Varma	120*	South Africa	Wanderers Stadium, Johannesburg, South Africa	15 November 2024	
Number 4	Suryakumar Yadav	117	England	Trent Bridge, Nottingham, England	10 July 2022	
Number 5	Ishan Kishan	80*	Sri Lanka	Kōrogi Sports Park, Nisshin, Japan	1 October 2026	
Number 6	Rinku Singh	69*	Afghanistan	M. Chinnaswamy Stadium, Bangalore, India	17 January 2024	
Number 7	Axar Patel	65	Sri Lanka	Maharashtra Cricket Association Stadium, Pune, India	5 January 2023	
Number 8	Naman Dhir	28	New Zealand	Eden Park, Auckland, New Zealand	30 October 2026	
Number 9	Irfan Pathan	33*	Sri Lanka	R.Premadasa Stadium, Colombo, Sri Lanka	10 February 2009	
Number 10	Umesh Yadav	20*	South Africa	Holkar Cricket Stadium, Indore, India	4 October 2022	
Number 11	Mohammed Siraj	7*	Pakistan	Nassau County International Cricket Stadium, New York, United States	9 June 2024	
Last Updated: 01 November 2026

=== Highest score against each opponent ===
Opposition	Player	Score	Date
Afghanistan	Virat Kohli	122*	8 September 2022
Australia	Ruturaj Gaikwad	123*	28 November 2023
Bangladesh	Sanju Samson	111	12 October 2024
England	Abhishek Sharma	135	2 February 2025
Hong Kong	Suryakumar Yadav	68*	31 August 2022
Ireland	Deepak Hooda	104	28 June 2022
Japan	Shreyas Iyer	16	22 September 2026
Namibia	Ishan Kishan	61	12 February 2026
Nepal	Yashasvi Jaiswal	100	3 October 2023
Netherlands	Shivam Dube	66	18 February 2026
New Zealand	Shubman Gill	126*	1 February 2023
Oman	Sanju Samson	56	19 September 2025
Pakistan	Virat Kohli	82*	23 October 2022
Scotland	K. L. Rahul	50	5 November 2021
South Africa	Tilak Varma	120*	15 November 2024
Sri Lanka	Rohit Sharma	118	22 December 2017
United Arab Emirates	Rohit Sharma	39	3 March 2016
United States	Suryakumar Yadav	84*	7 February 2026
West Indies	Rohit Sharma	111*	6 November 2018
Zimbabwe	Abhishek Sharma	100	7 July 2024
Last Updated: 22 September 2026

=== Highest career average ===
A batsman's batting average is the total number of runs they have scored divided by the number of times they have been dismissed.

Rank	Average	Player	Innings	Not out	Runs	Period
1	48.69	Virat Kohli	117	31	4,188	2010–2024
2	44.31	Manish Pandey	33	17	709	2015–2020
3	43.11	Tilak Varma†	75	26	1,940	2023–2026
4	39.56	Ruturaj Gaikwad†	20	4	633	2021–2024
5	37.75	KL Rahul†	68	8	2,265	2016–2022
Qualification: 20 innings. Last Updated: 01 November 2026

=== Highest average in each batting position ===
Batting position	Batsman	Innings	Runs	Average	Career Span	Ref
Opener	Virat Kohli	17	551	36.73	2011–2024	
Number 3	Virat Kohli	80	3,076	53.96	2023–2026	
Number 4	Tilak Varma†	14	490	54.44	2023–2025	
Number 5	Manish Pandey	15	357	51.00	2016–2020	
Number 6	Tilak Varma†	10	248	82.66	2023–2026	
Number 7	MS Dhoni	10	132	44.00	2011–2018	
Number 8	Ravichandran Ashwin	13	110	22.00	2011–2022	
Number 9	Bhuvneshwar Kumar†	11	28	5.60	2012–2026	
Number 10	Prince Yadav†	2	31	--	2026–2026	
Number 11	Mohammed Siraj†	2	12	12.00	2017–2024	
Qualification: Minimum 10 innings batted at position. Last updated: 31 October 2026

=== Most half-centuries ===
A half-century is a score of between 50 and 99 runs. Statistically, once a batsman's score reaches 100, it is no longer considered a half-century but a century.

Rank	Half centuries	Player	Innings	Period
1	38	Virat Kohli	117	2010–2024
2	32	Rohit Sharma	151	2007–2024
3	25	Suryakumar Yadav†	107	2021–2026
4	22	KL Rahul†	68	2016–2022
5	14	Abhishek Sharma†	71	2024–2026
5	14	Ishan Kishan	69	2021–2026
Last Updated: 01 November 2026

=== Most centuries ===
A century is a score of 100 or more runs in a single innings.

Rank	Centuries	Player	Innings	Period
1	5	Rohit Sharma	151	2007–2024
2	4	Abhishek Sharma†	71	2024–2026
2	4	Suryakumar Yadav†	107	2021–2026
4	3	Sanju Samson†	74	2015–2026
5	2	KL Rahul†	68	2016–2022
5	2	Tilak Varma†	71	2023–2026
Last Updated: 01 November 2026

=== Most Sixes ===
Rank	Sixes	Player	Innings	Period
1	205	Rohit Sharma	151	2007–2024
2	179	Suryakumar Yadav†	107	2021–2026
3	159	Abhishek Sharma†	71	2024–2026
4	126	Hardik Pandya†	109	2016–2026
5	124	Virat Kohli	117	2010–2024
Last Updated: 01 November 2026

=== Most Fours ===
Rank	Fours	Player	Innings	Period
1	383	Rohit Sharma	151	2007–2024
2	369	Virat Kohli	117	2010–2024
3	297	Suryakumar Yadav†	107	2021–2026
4	216	Abhishek Sharma†	71	2024–2026
5	206	Ishan Kishan†	69	2021–2026
Last Updated: 01 November 2026

=== Highest strike rates ===
Rank	Strike rate	Player	Runs	Balls Faced	Period
1	196.36	Abhishek Sharma†	2,268	1,155	2024–2026
2	164.31	Yashasvi Jaiswal†	723	440	2023–2024
3	162.94	Suryakumar Yadav†	3,272	2,008	2021–2026
4	158.24	Sanju Samson†	1,842	1,164	2015–2026
5	156.34	Rinku Singh†	702	449	2023–2026
Qualification= 250 balls faced. Last updated: 01 November 2026

=== Highest strike rates in an inning ===
Yuvraj Singh during his innings of 58 of 18 balls which included six sixes in an over off Stuart Broad and Dinesh Karthik with his innings of 29* off 8 balls against Bangladesh in the final of the 2018 Nidahas Trophy hold the top position for an India player in this list.

Rank	Strike rate	Player	Runs	Balls Faced	Opposition	Venue	Date
1	362.50	Yuvraj Singh	58	16	England	Sahara Stadium, Kingsmead, Durban, South Africa	19 September 2007 ‡
1	362.50	Dinesh Karthik	29*	8	Bangladesh	Ranasinghe Premadasa Stadium, Colombo, Sri Lanka	18 March 2018
3	355.55	Hardik Pandya†	32*	9	Ireland	Malahide Cricket Club Ground, Dublin, Ireland	29 June 2018
4	344.44	Rinku Singh†	31*	9	Australia	Greenfield International Stadium, Thiruvananthapuram, India	26 November 2023
5	340.00	Abhishek Sharma†	68*	20	New Zealand	Assam Cricket Association Stadium, Guwahati, India	25 January 2026
Last Updated: 25 January 2026

=== Most runs in a calendar year ===
Rank	Runs	Player	Matches	Innings	Year
1	1,220	Ishan Kishan†	37	37	2026
2	1,164	Suryakumar Yadav†	31	31	2022
3	1,153	Abhishek Sharma†	39	39	2026
4	859	Abhishek Sharma†	21	21	2025
5	810	Sanju Samson†	30	30	2026
Last Updated: 01 November 2026

=== Most runs in a tournament ===
Rank	Runs	Player	Matches	Innings	Series
1	321	Sanju Samson†	5	5	2026 Men's T20 World Cup
2	319	Virat Kohli	6	6	2014 ICC World Twenty20
3	317	Ishan Kishan†	9	9	2026 Men's T20 World Cup
4	314	Abhishek Sharma†	7	7	2025 Asia Cup
5	296	Virat Kohli	6	6	2022 ICC Men's T20 World Cup
Last Updated: 8 March 2026

=== Most ducks ===
A duck refers to a batsman being dismissed without scoring a run.

Rank	Ducks	Player	Innings	Period
1	12	Rohit Sharma	151	2007–2024
2	8	Abhishek Sharma†	70	2024–2026
2	8	Sanju Samson†	73	2015–2026
3	7	Suryakumar Yadav†	107	2021–2026
3	7	Virat Kohli	117	2010–2024
Last Updated: 31 October 2026

== Bowling records ==
=== Most career wickets ===
Rank	Wickets	Player	Matches	Innings	Period
1	151	Arshdeep Singh†	104	100	2022–2026
2	126	Jasprit Bumrah†	100	97	2016–2026
3	116	Axar Patel†	116	108	2015–2026
4	114	Hardik Pandya†	138	125	2016–2026
5	98	Kuldeep Yadav†	56	54	2017–2026
6	96	Yuzvendra Chahal	80	79	2016–2023
7	91	Bhuvneshwar Kumar†	92	90	2012–2026
8	76	Varun Chakravarthy†	50	47	2021–2026
9	72	Ravichandran Ashwin	65	65	2010–2022
10	71	Ravi Bishnoi†	54	53	2022–2026
Last Updated: 01 November 2026

=== Most wickets against each team ===
Opposition	Wickets	Bowler	Matches	Innings	Span	Ref
Afghanistan	13	Arshdeep Singh†	7	7	2022–2026	
Australia	20	Jasprit Bumrah†	18	17	2016–2025	
Bangladesh	10	Washington Sundar†	10	10	2018–2024	
England	21	Hardik Pandya†	21	20	2017–2026	
Hong Kong	1	Ravindra Jadeja	1	1	2022–2022	
Hong Kong	1	Bhuvneshwar Kumar†	1	1	2022–2022	
Hong Kong	1	Arshdeep Singh†	1	1	2022–2022	
Hong Kong	1	Avesh Khan†	1	1	2022–2022	
Ireland	8	Jasprit Bumrah†	4	4	2018–2024	
Ireland	8	Arshdeep Singh†	5	5	2023–2026	
Japan	2	Washington Sundar†	1	1	2026–2026	
Namibia	3	Ravindra Jadeja	1	1	2021–2021	
Namibia	3	Ravichandran Ashwin†	1	1	2021–2021	
Namibia	3	Varun Chakravarthy†	1	1	2026–2026	
Namibia	3	Jasprit Bumrah†	2	2	2021–2026	
Nepal	3	Ravi Bishnoi†	1	1	2023–2023	
Nepal	3	Avesh Khan†	1	1	2023–2023	
Netherlands	3	Varun Chakravarthy†	1	1	2026–2026	
New Zealand	23	Arshdeep Singh†	15	15	2022–2026	
Oman	1	Hardik Pandya†	1	1	2025–2025	
Oman	1	Harshit Rana†	1	1	2025–2025	
Oman	1	Kuldeep Yadav†	1	1	2025–2025	
Oman	1	Arshdeep Singh†	1	1	2025–2025	
Pakistan	17	Hardik Pandya†	10	9	2016–2026	
Scotland	3	Mohammad Shami†	1	1	2021–2021	
Scotland	3	Ravindra Jadeja	1	1	2021–2021	
South Africa	25	Arshdeep Singh†	15	15	2022–2026	
Sri Lanka	23	Yuzvendra Chahal†	13	13	2017–2023	
United Arab Emirates	4	Kuldeep Yadav†	1	1	2025–2025	
United States	6	Arshdeep Singh†	2	2	2024–2026	
West Indies	20	Kuldeep Yadav†	11	11	2017–2026	
Zimbabwe	9	Ravi Bishnoi†	8	8	2024–2026	
Last updated: 01 November 2026

=== Best figures in an innings ===
Bowling figures refers to the number of the wickets a bowler has taken and the number of runs conceded.

Rank	Figures	Player	Opposition	Venue	Date
1	6/7	Deepak Chahar	Bangladesh	Vidarbha Cricket Association Stadium, Nagpur, India	10 November 2019
2	6/25	Yuzvendra Chahal	England	M. Chinnaswamy Stadium, Bangalore, India	1 February 2017
3	5/4	Bhuvneshwar Kumar	Afghanistan	Dubai International Cricket Stadium, Dubai, UAE	8 September 2022
4	5/17	Kuldeep Yadav	South Africa	New Wanderers Stadium, Johannesburg, South Africa	14 December 2023
4	5/17	Varun Chakravarthy	South Africa	St George's Park Cricket Ground, Gqeberha, South Africa	10 November 2024
Last Updated: 10 November 2024

=== Best figures in an innings – progression of record ===
Figures	Player	Opposition	Venue	Date
2/10	Ajit Agarkar	South Africa	New Wanderers Stadium, Johannesburg, South Africa	1 December 2006
3/37	Irfan Pathan	England	Kingsmead Cricket Ground, Durban, South Africa	19 September 2007 ‡
4/13	R. P. Singh	South Africa	Kingsmead Cricket Ground, Durban, South Africa	20 September 2007 ‡
4/8	Ravichandran Ashwin	Sri Lanka	ACA-VDCA Cricket Stadium, Visakhapatnam, India	14 February 2016
6/25	Yuzvendra Chahal	England	M. Chinnaswamy Stadium, Bangalore, India	1 February 2017
6/7	Deepak Chahar	Bangladesh	Vidarbha Cricket Association Stadium, Nagpur, India	10 November 2019
Last Updated: 9 August 2020

=== Best Bowling Figure against each opponent ===
Opposition	Player	Figures	Date
Afghanistan	Bhuvneshwar Kumar	5/4	8 September 2022
Australia	Ravichandran Ashwin	4/11	30 March 2014 ‡
Bangladesh	Deepak Chahar	6/7	10 November 2019
England	Yuzvendra Chahal	6/25	1 February 2017
Hong Kong	Ravindra Jadeja	1/15	31 August 2022
Hong Kong	Bhuvneshwar Kumar	1/15	31 August 2022
Ireland	Zaheer Khan	4/19	10 June 2009 ‡
Japan	Washington Sundar	2/13	22 September 2026 ‡
Namibia	Ravindra Jadeja	3/16	8 November 2021
Nepal	Ravi Bishnoi	3/24	3 October 2023
Netherlands	Varun Chakravarthy	3/14	18 February 2026
New Zealand	Arshdeep Singh	5/51	31 January 2026
Oman	Kuldeep Yadav	1/23	19 September 2025
Pakistan	Bhuvneshwar Kumar	4/26	28 August 2022
Scotland	Ravindra Jadeja	3/15	5 November 2021
Scotland	Mohammad Shami	3/15	5 November 2021
South Africa	Kuldeep Yadav	5/17	14 December 2023
South Africa	Varun Chakravarthy	5/17	10 November 2024
Sri Lanka	Ravichandran Ashwin	4/8	14 February 2016
United Arab Emirates	Kuldeep Yadav	4/7	10 September 2025
United States	Arshdeep Singh	4/9	12 June 2024
West Indies	Ravi Bishnoi	4/16	7 August 2022
Zimbabwe	Barinder Sran	4/10	20 June 2016
Last updated: 22 September 2026

=== Best career average ===
A bowler's bowling average is the total number of runs they have conceded divided by the number of wickets they have taken.

Rank	Average	Player	Wickets	Runs	Overs	Period
1	14.20	Kuldeep Yadav†	98	1,392	195.5	2017–2026
2	17.71	Varun Chakravarthy†	76	1,346	175.3	2021–2026
3	18.21	Jasprit Bumrah†	126	2,295	351.4	2016–2026
4	20.74	Arshdeep Singh†	151	3,133	361.1	2022–2026
5	21.02	Ravi Bishnoi†	71	1,493	196.5	2022–2026
Qualification: 500 balls. Last Updated: 1 November 2026

=== Best career economy rate ===
A bowler's economy rate is the total number of runs they have conceded divided by the number of overs they have bowled.

Rank	Economy rate	Player	Runs	Overs	Period
1	6.20	Harbhajan Singh	633	102.0	2006–2016
2	6.52	Jasprit Bumrah†	2,295	351.4	2016–2026
3	6.90	Ravichandran Ashwin	1,672	242.0	2010–2022
4	7.09	Washington Sundar†	1,312	184.5	2017–2026
5	7.10	Kuldeep Yadav†	1,392	195.5	2017–2026
Qualification: 500 balls. Last Updated: 27 October 2026

=== Best career strike rate ===
A bowler's strike rate is the total number of balls they have bowled divided by the number of wickets they have taken.

Rank	Strike rate	Player	Wickets	Overs	Period
1	11.98	Kuldeep Yadav†	98	195.5	2017–2026
2	13.85	Varun Chakravarthy†	76	175.3	2016–2026
3	14.35	Arshdeep Singh†	151	361.1	2022–2026
4	15.33	Shardul Thakur†	33	84.2	2018–2022
5	16.35	Shivam Dube†	40	109	2019–2026
Qualification: 500 balls. Last Updated: 1 November 2026

=== Most four-wickets (& over) hauls in an innings ===
Rank	Four-wicket hauls	Player	Innings	Overs	Wickets	Period
1	5	Kuldeep Yadav†	54	195.5	98	2017–2026
1	5	Bhuvneshwar Kumar†	90	314.3	91	2012–2026
3	3	Varun Chakravarthy†	47	175.3	76	2021–2026
3	3	Yuzvendra Chahal†	79	294.0	96	2016–2023
3	3	Arshdeep Singh†	100	361.1	151	2022–2026
3	3	Hardik Pandya†	125	370.5	114	2016–2026
Last Updated: 1 November 2026

=== Best economy rates in an inning ===
Rank	Economy	Player	Overs	Runs	Wickets	Opposition	Venue	Date
1	1.00	Bhuvneshwar Kumar	4	4	5	Afghanistan	Dubai International Cricket Stadium, Dubai, UAE	8 September 2022
1	1.00	Bhuvneshwar Kumar	3	3	0	West Indies	Sher-e-Bangla National Cricket Stadium, Mirpur, Bangladesh	23 March 2014‡
3	1.33	Deepak Chahar	3	4	3	West Indies	Providence Stadium, Providence, Guyana	6 August 2019
4	1.50	Harshal Patel	2	3	1	South Africa	Niranjan Shah Stadium, Rajkot, India	17 June 2022
5	1.75	Jasprit Bumrah	4	7	3	Afghanistan	Kensington Oval, Bridgetown, Barbados	20 June 2024‡
Qualification: 12 balls bowled. Last Updated: 20 June 2024

=== Best strike rates in an inning ===
The best strike rate in an inning, when a minimum of 4 wickets are taken by the player, is by Steve Tikolo of Kenya during his spell of 4/2 in 1.2 overs against Scotland during the 2013 ICC World Twenty20 Qualifier at ICC Academy, Dubai, UAE.

Rank	Strike rate	Player	Wickets	Runs	Balls	Opposition	Venue	Date
1	3.25	Kuldeep Yadav	4	7	13	United Arab Emirates	Dubai International Cricket Stadium, Dubai, UAE	10 September 2025
2	3.33	Deepak Chahar	6	7	20	Bangladesh	Vidarbha Cricket Association Stadium, Nagpur, India	10 November 2019
3	3.40	Kuldeep Yadav	5	17	17	South Africa	Wanderers Stadium, Johannesburg, South Africa	14 December 2023
4	4.00	Yuzvendra Chahal	6	25	24	England	M. Chinnaswamy Stadium, Bangalore, India	1 February 2017
4	4.00	Ravi Bishnoi	4	16	16	West Indies	Lauderhill, Florida, West Indies	7 August 2022
Last Updated: 10 September 2025

=== Most runs conceded in a match ===
Rank	Runs	Figures	Player	Overs	Opposition	Venue	Date
1	68	0/68	Prasidh Krishna	4	Australia	Assam Cricket Association Stadium, Guwahati, India	28 November 2023
2	64	0/64	Yuzvendra Chahal	4	South Africa	Centurion Park, Centurion, South Africa	21 February 2018
2	64	1/64	Varun Chakravarthy	4	England	Wankhede Stadium, Mumbai, India	5 March 2026 ‡
2	64	1/64	Nitish Kumar Reddy	4	New Zealand	Eden Park, Auckland, New Zealand	30 October 2026
5	63	0/63	Axar Patel	4	England	Rose Bowl, Southampton, England	11 July 2026
5	63	0/63	Axar Patel	3.3	West Indies	JSCA International Stadium Complex, Ranchi, India	9 October 2026
Last updated: 31 October 2026

=== Most wickets in a calendar year ===
Rank	Wickets	Player	Matches	Innings	Year
1	41	Arshdeep Singh	32	29	2026
2	37	Bhuvneshwar Kumar	32	31	2022
3	36	Arshdeep Singh	18	18	2024
3	36	Varun Chakravarthy	20	18	2025
5	34	Axar Patel	31	29	2026
Last Updated: 2 November 2026

=== Most wickets in a tournament ===
Rank	Wickets	Player	Innings	Series
1	17	Kuldeep Yadav	7	2025 Asia Cup
1	17	Arshdeep Singh	8	2024 Men's T20 World Cup
3	15	Jasprit Bumrah	8	2024 Men's T20 World Cup
4	14	Varun Chakravarthy	5	England in India in 2025
4	14	Jasprit Bumrah	8	2026 Men's T20 World Cup
4	14	Varun Chakravarthy	9	2026 Men's T20 World Cup
Last Updated: 8 March 2026

=== Hat-trick ===
In cricket, a hat-trick occurs when a bowler takes three wickets with consecutive deliveries. The deliveries may be interrupted by an over bowled by another bowler from the other end of the pitch or the other team's innings, but must be three consecutive deliveries by the individual bowler in the same match. Only wickets attributed to the bowler count towards a hat-trick; run outs do not count.

S. No	Bowler	Against	Wickets	Venue	Date	Ref.
1	Deepak Chahar	Bangladesh	Shafiul Islam (c KL Rahul); Mustafizur Rahman (c Shreyas Iyer); Aminul Islam (b)	(India) Vidarbha Cricket Association Stadium, Nagpur	10 November 2019	
Last Updated: 9 August 2020

== Wicket-keeping records ==
The wicket-keeper is a specialist fielder who stands behind the stumps being guarded by the batsman on strike and is the only member of the fielding side allowed to wear gloves and leg pads.

=== Most career dismissals ===
A wicket-keeper can be credited with the dismissal of a batsman in two ways, caught or stumped. A fair catch is taken when the ball is caught fully within the field of play without it bouncing after the ball has touched the striker's bat or glove holding the bat, Laws 5.6.2.2 and 5.6.2.3 state that the hand or the glove holding the bat shall be regarded as the ball striking or touching the bat while a stumping occurs when the wicket-keeper puts down the wicket while the batsman is out of his ground and not attempting a run.

Rank	Dismissals	Player	Matches	Innings	Catches	Stumpings	Dis/Inn	Period
1	91	MS Dhoni	98	97	57	34	0.938	2006–2019
2	49	Rishabh Pant†	76	62	38	11	0.790	2017–2024
3	46	Sanju Samson†	82	60	38	8	0.766	2015–2026
4	27	Dinesh Karthik	59	19	19	8	1.421	2006–2022
5	23	Ishan Kishan†	69	29	18	5	0.793	2021–2026
Last updated: 2 November 2026

=== Most career catches ===
Rank	Catches	Player	Matches	Innings	Period
1	57	MS Dhoni	98	97	2006–2019
2	38	Rishabh Pant†	76	62	2017–2024
3	38	Sanju Samson†	82	60	2015–2026
4	19	Dinesh Karthik	59	19	2006–2022
5	18	Ishan Kishan†	69	29	2021–2026
Last Updated: 2 November 2026

=== Most career stumpings ===
Rank	Stumpings	Player	Matches	Innings	Period
1	34 ♠	MS Dhoni	98	97	2006–2019
2	11	Rishabh Pant†	76	62	2017–2024
3	8	Dinesh Karthik	59	19	2006–2022
3	8	Sanju Samson†	82	60	2015–2026
5	5	Ishan Kishan†	69	29	2021–2026
Last Updated: 2 November 2026

=== Most dismissals in an innings ===
Rank	Dismissals	Player	Opposition	Venue	Date
1	5	MS Dhoni	England	Bristol County Ground, Bristol, England	8 July 2018
2	4	MS Dhoni	Afghanistan	Darren Sammy National Cricket Stadium, Gros Islet, Saint Lucia	1 May 2010
2	4	MS Dhoni	Pakistan	Ranasinghe Premadasa Stadium, Colombo, Sri Lanka	30 September 2012
2	4	MS Dhoni	Sri Lanka	Barabati Stadium, Cuttack, India	20 December 2017
2	4	Dinesh Karthik	England	Rose Bowl, Southampton, England	7 July 2022
2	4	Jitesh Sharma	South Africa	Barabati Stadium, Cuttack, India	9 December 2025
Last Updated: 9 December 2025

=== Most dismissals in a series ===
Rank	Dismissals	Player	Matches	Innings	Series
1	14	Rishabh Pant	8	8	2024 ICC Men's T20 World Cup
2	8	MS Dhoni	5	5	2016 ICC World Twenty20
3	7	MS Dhoni	3	3	India in England in 2018
3	7	Jitesh Sharma	4	3	South Africa in India in 2025
3	7	MS Dhoni	5	5	2010 ICC World Twenty20
3	7	MS Dhoni	5	5	2016 Asia Cup
Last Updated: 19 December 2025

== Fielding records ==
=== Most career catches by a fielder ===
Caught is one of the nine methods a batsman can be dismissed in cricket. (Note: In 2017, The Laws of Cricket were amended, reducing the methods of dismissals from ten to nine, with handled the ball now covered as part of obstructing the field.) The majority of catches are caught in the slips, located behind the batsman, next to the wicket-keeper, on the off side of the field. Most slip fielders are top order batsmen.

Rank	Catches	Player	Matches	Innings	Ct/Inn	Period
1	65	Rohit Sharma	159	159	0.408	2007–2024
2	64	Hardik Pandya†	138	137	0.467	2016–2026
3	58	Suryakumar Yadav†	113	111	0.522	2021–2026
4	54	Virat Kohli	125	124	0.435	2010–2024
5	53	Tilak Varma†	75	72	0.736	2023–2026
Last Updated: 2 November 2026

=== Most catches in an innings ===
Rank	Dismissals	Player	Opposition	Venue	Date
1	4	Ajinkya Rahane	England	Edgbaston Cricket Ground, Birmingham, England	7 September 2014
1	4	Rinku Singh†	New Zealand	ACA–VDCA Cricket Stadium, Visakhapatnam, India	28 January 2026
3	3	15 players on 20 occasions			
Last Updated: 28 January 2026

=== Most catches in a series ===
Rank	Catches	Player	Matches	Innings	Series
1	8	Tilak Varma	9	9	2026 Men's T20 World Cup‡
2	7	Rinku Singh	5	5	New Zealand in India in 2026
3	6	Hardik Pandya	3	3	Sri Lanka in India in 2017-18
3	6	Suresh Raina	5	5	2012 World Twenty20‡
3	6	Rinku Singh	5	5	India in Zimbabwe in 2024
3	6	Suryakumar Yadav	6	6	2022 Men's T20 World Cup‡
3	6	Shivam Dube	9	9	2026 Men's T20 World Cup‡
Last Updated: 12 October 2026

== Other records ==
=== Most career matches ===
Rank	Matches	Player	Runs	Wkts	Period
1	159	Rohit Sharma	4,231	1	2007–2024
2	138	Hardik Pandya†	2,288	114	2016–2026
3	125	Virat Kohli	4,188	4	2010–2024
4	116	Axar Patel†	829	116	2015–2026
5	113	Suryakumar Yadav†	3,272	2	2021–2026
Last Updated: 30 October 2026

=== Most consecutive career matches ===
Rank	Matches	Player	Period
1	45	Suryakumar Yadav†	2024–2026
2	43	Suresh Raina	2009–2014
3	39	MS Dhoni	2015–2018
4	35*	Tilak Varma†	2026–2026
5	34	Abhishek Sharma†	2024–2026
Last updated: 1 November 2026

=== Most matches as captain ===
Rank	Matches	Player	Won	Lost	Tied	NR	Win %	Period
1	72	MS Dhoni	41	28	1	2	59.28	2007–2016
2	62	Rohit Sharma	49	12	1	0	79.83	2017–2024
3	52	Suryakumar Yadav	40	8	2	2	82.00	2023–2026
4	50	Virat Kohli	30	16	2	2	64.58	2017–2021
5	26	Shreyas Iyer†	14	10	0	2	58.33	2026–2026
Last Updated: 1 November 2026

=== Most matches won as a captain ===
Rank	Won	Player	Matches	Lost	Tied	NR	Win %	Period
1	49	Rohit Sharma	62	12	1	1	79.83	2017–2024
2	41	MS Dhoni	72	28	1	2	59.28	2007–2016
3	40	Suryakumar Yadav†	52	8	2	2	82.00	2023–2026
4	30	Virat Kohli	50	16	2	2	64.58	2017–2021
5	14	Shreyas Iyer†	26	10	0	2	58.33	2026–2026
Last Updated: 1 November 2026

=== Most man of the match awards ===
Rank	M.O.M	Player	Matches	Period
1	17	Suryakumar Yadav†	113	2021–2026
2	16	Virat Kohli	125	2010–2024
3	14	Rohit Sharma	159	2007–2024
4	8	Abhishek Sharma†	72	2024–2026
4	8	Jasprit Bumrah†	100	2015–2026
4	8	Axar Patel†	116	2015–2026
4	8	Hardik Pandya†	138	2016–2026
Last Updated: 2 November 2026

=== Most man of the series awards ===
Rank	M.O.S	Player	Matches	Period
1	6	Suryakumar Yadav†	113	2021–2026
1	6	Virat Kohli	125	2010–2024
3	3	Abhishek Sharma†	72	2024–2025
3	3	Hardik Pandya†	138	2016–2025
5	2	Varun Chakravarthy†	50	2021–2025
5	2	Washington Sundar†	65	2017–2025
5	2	Yuzvendra Chahal†	80	2016–2023
5	2	Bhuvneshwar Kumar†	92	2012–2026
5	2	Jasprit Bumrah†	100	2016–2026
5	2	Axar Patel†	116	2015–2026
5	2	Rohit Sharma	159	2007–2024
Last Updated: 2 November 2026

=== Youngest players on debut ===
Rank	Age	Player	Opposition	Venue	Date
1	15 years and 99 days	Vaibhav Sooryavanshi	England	Old Trafford, Manchester, England	4 July 2026
2	18 years and 80 days	Washington Sundar	Sri Lanka	Wankhede Stadium, Mumbai, India	24 December 2017
3	19 years and 120 days	Rishabh Pant	England	M. Chinnaswamy Stadium, Bangalore, India	1 February 2017
4	19 years and 152 days	Ishant Sharma	Australia	Melbourne Cricket Ground, Melbourne, Australia	1 February 2008
5	20 years and 2 days	Rahul Chahar	West Indies	Providence Stadium, Providence, Guyana	6 August 2019
Last Updated: 9 August 2020

=== Oldest Players on debut ===
Rank	Age	Player	Opposition	Venue	Date
1	38 years and 232 days	Rahul Dravid	England	Old Trafford Cricket Ground, Manchester, England	31 August 2011
2	33 years and 221 days	Sachin Tendulkar	South Africa	Wanderers Stadium, Johannesburg, South Africa	1 December 2006
3	31 years and 309 days	Rahul Tripathi	Sri Lanka	Maharashtra Cricket Association Stadium, Pune, India	5 January 2023
4	31 years and 177 days	Sreenath Aravind	South Africa	Himachal Pradesh Cricket Association Stadium, Dharamshala, India	2 October 2015
5	31 years and 44 days	Stuart Binny	Zimbabwe	Harare Sports Club, Harare, Zimbabwe	17 July 2015
Last Updated: 5 January 2023

=== Oldest Players ===
Rank	Age	Player	Opposition	Venue	Date
1	38 years and 232 days	Rahul Dravid	England	Old Trafford Cricket Ground, Manchester, England	31 August 2011
2	38 years and 186 days	Ashish Nehra	New Zealand	Arun Jaitley Stadium, Delhi, India	1 November 2017
3	37 years and 235 days	MS Dhoni	Australia	M. Chinnaswamy Stadium, Bangalore, India	27 February 2019
4	37 years and 154 days	Dinesh Karthik	Bangladesh	Adelaide Oval, Adelaide, Australia	2 November 2022
5	37 years and 60 days	Rohit Sharma	South Africa	Kensington Oval, Bridgetown, Barbados	29 June 2024
Last Updated: 29 June 2024

== Partnership records ==
In cricket, two batsmen are always present at the crease batting together in a partnership. This partnership will continue until one of them is dismissed, retires or the innings comes to a close.

=== Highest partnerships by wicket ===
A wicket partnership describes the number of runs scored before each wicket falls. The first wicket partnership is between the opening batsmen and continues until the first wicket falls. The second wicket partnership then commences between the not out batsman and the number three batsman. This partnership continues until the second wicket falls. The third wicket partnership then commences between the not out batsman and the new batsman. This continues down to the tenth wicket partnership. When the tenth wicket has fallen, there is no batsman left to partner so the innings is closed.

Wicket	Runs	Players		Opposition	Venue	Date
1st Wicket	165	K. L. Rahul	Rohit Sharma	Sri Lanka	Holkar Stadium, Indore, India	22 December 2017
1st Wicket	165	Yashasvi Jaiswal	Shubman Gill	West Indies	Central Broward Park, Lauderhill, USA	12 August 2023
2nd Wicket	210*	Sanju Samson	Tilak Varma	South Africa	Wanderers Stadium, Johannesburg, South Africa	15 November 2024
3rd Wicket	137	Ishan Kishan	Suryakumar Yadav	New Zealand	Greenfield International Stadium, Thiruvananthapuram, India	31 January 2026
4th Wicket	141*	Ruturaj Gaikwad	Tilak Varma	Australia	Assam Cricket Association Stadium, Guwahati, India	28 November 2023
5th Wicket	190*	Rohit Sharma	Rinku Singh	Afghanistan	M. Chinnaswamy Stadium, Bengaluru, India	17 January 2024
6th Wicket	91	Suryakumar Yadav	Axar Patel	Sri Lanka	Maharashtra Cricket Association Stadium, Pune, India	5 January 2023
7th Wicket	69*	Tilak Varma	Nitish Kumar Reddy	New Zealand	Hagley Oval, Christchurch, New Zealand	24 October 2026
8th Wicket	61	Suresh Raina	Harbhajan Singh	New Zealand	Lancaster Park, Christchurch, New Zealand	25 February 2009
9th Wicket	48	Deepak Chahar	Umesh Yadav	South Africa	Holkar Stadium, Indore, India	4 October 2022
10th Wicket	17*	S. Sreesanth	R.P. Singh	New Zealand	New Wanderers Stadium, Johannesburg, South Africa	16 September 2007 ‡
Last Updated: 2 November 2026

=== Highest partnerships by runs ===
Rank	Wicket	Runs	Players		Opposition	Venue	Date
1	2nd Wicket	210*	Sanju Samson	Tilak Varma	South Africa	Wanderers Stadium, Johannesburg, South Africa	15 November 2024
2	5th Wicket	190*	Rohit Sharma	Rinku Singh	Afghanistan	M.Chinnaswamy Stadium, Bengaluru, India	17 January 2024
3	2nd Wicket	176	Sanju Samson	Deepak Hooda	Ireland	Malahide, Dublin, Ireland	28 June 2022
4	2nd Wicket	173	Sanju Samson	Suryakumar Yadav	Bangladesh	Rajiv Gandhi International Cricket Stadium, Hyderabad, India	12 October 2024
5	1st Wicket	165	K. L. Rahul	Rohit Sharma	Sri Lanka	Holkar Stadium, Indore, India	22 December 2017
5	1st Wicket	165	Yashasvi Jaiswal	Shubman Gill	West Indies	Central Broward Park, Lauderhill, USA	12 August 2023
Last Updated: 15 November 2024

=== Highest overall partnership runs by a pair ===
Rank	Runs	Innings	Players		Highest	Average	100	50	T20I career span
1	1,897	42	KL Rahul	Rohit Sharma	165	46.26	5	10	2016–2022
2	1,743	52	Shikhar Dhawan	Rohit Sharma	160	33.51	4	7	2013–2019
3	1,350	42	Virat Kohli	Rohit Sharma	138	32.14	3	5	2010–2024
4	1,309	43	Abhishek Sharma	Sanju Samson	142	30.44	1	7	2024–2026
5	1,015	27	Virat Kohli	KL Rahul	119	39.03	2	6	2017–2022
An asterisk (*) signifies an unbroken partnership (i.e. neither of the batsmen was dismissed before either the end of the allotted overs or the required score being reached). Last updated: 1 November 2026

== See also ==
- List of Twenty20 International records
- List of Twenty20 International cricket hat-tricks
- List of Test cricket records
- List of One Day International cricket records
- List of India Test cricket records
- List of India One Day International cricket records
