= English cricket team in India in 2024–25 =

International cricket tour

	India	England
- Dates: 22 January – 12 February 2025
Captains	Rohit Sharma (ODIs); Suryakumar Yadav (T20Is)	Jos Buttler

One Day International series
- Results: India won the 3-match series 3–0
Most runs	Shubman Gill (259)	Ben Duckett (131)
Most wickets	Ravindra Jadeja (6); Harshit Rana (6)	Adil Rashid (7)
- Player of the series: Shubman Gill (Ind)

Twenty20 International series
- Results: India won the 5-match series 4–1
Most runs	Abhishek Sharma (279)	Jos Buttler (146)
Most wickets	Varun Chakravarthy (14)	Brydon Carse (9)
- Player of the series: Varun Chakravarthy (Ind)

The England cricket team toured India in January and February 2025 to play the India cricket team. The tour consisted of three One Day International (ODI) and five Twenty20 International (T20I) matches. In June 2024, the Board of Control for Cricket in India (BCCI) confirmed the fixtures for the tour, as a part of the 2024–25 home international season. The ODI series was used as preparation ahead of the 2025 ICC Champions Trophy.

On 13 August 2024, BCCI swapped the venue of first and second T20I match, because a request from Kolkata Police to the Cricket Association of Bengal (CAB) regarding their prior Republic Day commitments and obligations.

== Squads ==
India		England	
ODIs	T20Is	ODIs	T20Is
Rohit Sharma (c); Shubman Gill (vc); Jasprit Bumrah; Varun Chakravarthy; Shreyas Iyer; Ravindra Jadeja; Yashasvi Jaiswal; Virat Kohli; Hardik Pandya; Rishabh Pant (wk); Axar Patel; KL Rahul (wk); Harshit Rana; Arshdeep Singh; Mohammed Shami; Washington Sundar; Kuldeep Yadav	Suryakumar Yadav (c); Axar Patel (vc); Ravi Bishnoi; Varun Chakravarthy; Shivam Dube (Note: In squad for last 4 T20Is only.); Dhruv Jurel (wk); Hardik Pandya; Harshit Rana; Nitish Kumar Reddy (Note: In squad for first T20I only.); Sanju Samson (wk); Mohammed Shami; Abhishek Sharma; Arshdeep Singh; Ramandeep Singh; Rinku Singh (Note: In squad for first, fourth and fifth T20I only.); Washington Sundar; Tilak Varma	Jos Buttler (c, wk); Jofra Archer; Gus Atkinson; Tom Banton (Note: In squad for third ODI only.); Jacob Bethell; Harry Brook; Brydon Carse; Ben Duckett; Jamie Overton; Jamie Smith (wk); Liam Livingstone; Adil Rashid; Joe Root; Saqib Mahmood; Phil Salt (wk); Mark Wood	Jos Buttler (c, wk); Rehan Ahmed; Jofra Archer; Gus Atkinson; Jacob Bethell; Harry Brook; Brydon Carse; Ben Duckett; Jamie Overton; Jamie Smith (wk); Liam Livingstone; Adil Rashid; Saqib Mahmood; Phil Salt (wk); Mark Wood

On 25 January, Nitish Kumar Reddy was ruled out of the T20I series after he sustained a side strain injury, and Shivam Dube and Ramandeep Singh were added into the squad.

On 4 February, Varun Chakravarthy was added into the ODI squad.

On 8 February, Tom Banton was added to the ODI squad as a cover.

== T20I series ==
=== 1st T20I ===
22 January 2025
19:00 (N)
Scorecard

England; 132 (20 overs)	v	India; 133/3 (12.5 overs)
Jos Buttler 68 (44); Varun Chakravarthy 3/23 (4 overs)		Abhishek Sharma 79 (34); Jofra Archer 2/21 (4 overs)

India won by 7 wickets
Eden Gardens, Kolkata
Umpires: Jayaraman Madanagopal (Ind) and Nitin Menon (Ind)
Player of the match: Varun Chakravarthy (Ind)

- India won the toss and elected to field.
- Arshdeep Singh became India's leading wicket taker in T20Is (97) going past Yuzvendra Chahal (96).

=== 2nd T20I ===
25 January 2025
19:00 (N)
Scorecard

England; 165/9 (20 overs)	v	India; 166/8 (19.2 overs)
Jos Buttler 45 (30); Axar Patel 2/32 (4 overs)		Tilak Varma 72* (55); Brydon Carse 3/29 (4 overs)

India won by 2 wickets
M. A. Chidambaram Stadium, Chennai
Umpires: K. N. Ananthapadmanabhan (Ind) and Virender Sharma (Ind)
Player of the match: Tilak Varma (Ind)

- India won the toss and elected to field.
- Jamie Smith (Eng) made his T20I debut.

=== 3rd T20I ===
28 January 2025
19:00 (N)
Scorecard

England; 171/9 (20 overs)	v	India; 145/9 (20 overs)
Ben Duckett 51 (28); Varun Chakravarthy 5/24 (4 overs)		Hardik Pandya 40 (35); Jamie Overton 3/24 (4 overs)

England won by 26 runs
Niranjan Shah Stadium, Rajkot
Umpires: K. N. Ananthapadmanabhan (Ind) and Rohan Pandit (Ind)
Player of the match: Varun Chakravarthy (Ind)

- India won the toss and elected to field.

=== 4th T20I ===
31 January 2025
19:00 (N)
Scorecard

India; 181/9 (20 overs)	v	England; 166 (19.4 overs)
Hardik Pandya 53 (30); Saqib Mahmood 3/35 (4 overs)		Harry Brook 51 (26); Ravi Bishnoi 3/28 (4 overs)

India won by 15 runs
Maharashtra Cricket Association Stadium, Pune
Umpires: Jayaraman Madanagopal (Ind) and Nitin Menon (Ind)
Player of the match: Shivam Dube (Ind)

- England won the toss and elected to field.
- Saqib Mahmood (Eng) became only the second bowler, after West Indies' Jerome Taylor to complete a triple wicket maiden over in T20Is.
- Harshit Rana (Ind) made his T20I debut after replacing Shivam Dube (Ind) as a concussion substitute for India during the second innings. He became the first player from a full member team to make his T20I debut as a concussion substitute.

=== 5th T20I ===
2 February 2025
19:00 (N)
Scorecard

India; 247/9 (20 overs)	v	England; 97 (10.3 overs)
Abhishek Sharma 135 (54); Brydon Carse 3/38 (4 overs)		Phil Salt 55 (23); Mohammed Shami 3/25 (2.3 overs)

India won by 150 runs
Wankhede Stadium, Mumbai
Umpires: Rohan Pandit (Ind) and Virender Sharma (Ind)
Player of the match: Abhishek Sharma (Ind)

- England won the toss and elected to field.
- India made their highest powerplay score (95/1).
- Abhishek Sharma (Ind) set the highest individual score (135) surpassing Shubman Gill (126) and hit most sixes in an innings (13) going past Rohit Sharma (10) by an Indian player in T20Is.
- India recorded their second-biggest victory in T20Is.
- Mark Wood (Eng) played in his last T20I.

== ODI series ==
=== 1st ODI ===
6 February 2025
13:30 (D/N)
Scorecard

England; 248 (47.4 overs)	v	India; 251/6 (38.4 overs)
Jos Buttler 52 (67); Ravindra Jadeja 3/26 (9 overs)		Shubman Gill 87 (96); Adil Rashid 2/49 (10 overs)

India won by 4 wickets
Vidarbha Cricket Association Stadium, Nagpur
Umpires: K. N. Ananthapadmanabhan (Ind) and Sharfuddoula (Ban)
Player of the match: Shubman Gill (Ind)

- England won the toss and elected to bat.
- Yashasvi Jaiswal and Harshit Rana (Ind) both made their ODI debuts.
- Ravindra Jadeja (Ind) took his 600th wicket in international cricket, and thus became the first Indian spinner to complete 6000 runs and 600 wickets in international cricket.
- Harshit Rana became the first Indian bowler to take a 3-wicket haul on debut in all three formats of international cricket.

=== 2nd ODI ===
9 February 2025
13:30 (D/N)
Scorecard

England; 304 (49.5 overs)	v	India; 308/6 (44.3 overs)
Joe Root 69 (72); Ravindra Jadeja 3/35 (10 overs)		Rohit Sharma 119 (90); Jamie Overton 2/27 (5 overs)

India won by 4 wickets
Barabati Stadium, Cuttack
Umpires: Chris Brown (NZ) and Jayaraman Madanagopal (Ind)
Player of the match: Rohit Sharma (Ind)

- England won the toss and elected to bat.
- Varun Chakravarthy (Ind) made his ODI debut.
- Rohit Sharma (Ind) played his 50th ODI as captain.
- Joe Root (Eng) scored his 56th fifty-plus score in ODIs, the most for England breaking the record of Eoin Morgan.
- Rohit Sharma surpassed Sachin Tendulkar to become the 2nd highest run-scorer as an opener for India in international cricket.

=== 3rd ODI ===
12 February 2025
13:30 (D/N)
Scorecard

India; 356 (50 overs)	v	England; 214 (34.2 overs)
Shubman Gill 112 (102); Adil Rashid 4/64 (10 overs)		Gus Atkinson 38 (19); Axar Patel 2/22 (6.2 overs)

India won by 142 runs
Narendra Modi Stadium, Ahmedabad
Umpires: Sharfuddoula (Ban) and Virender Sharma (Ind)
Player of the match: Shubman Gill (Ind)

- England won the toss and elected to field.
- Shubman Gill (Ind) became the fastest batsman to cross 2,500 runs, in terms of innings (50), surpassing South Africa's Hashim Amla in ODIs.
- Virat Kohli (Ind) scored 16,000 runs across all formats in Asia, becoming the 4th player overall to achieve this milestone. He also became the fastest to reach this feat in just 340 innings, surpassing Kumar Sangakkara's 410 innings record.
- Shubman Gill (Ind) scored his 5,000th run in international cricket.
- Shubman Gill (Ind) became only the fifth player in international cricket history to score a century in all three formats at a single venue.
