= Afghan cricket team in India in 2023–24 =

International cricket tour

	India	Afghanistan
- Dates: 11 – 17 January 2024
Captains	Rohit Sharma	Ibrahim Zadran

Twenty20 International series
- Results: India won the 3-match series 3–0
Most runs	Shivam Dube (124)	Gulbadin Naib (112)
Most wickets	Axar Patel (4)	Fareed Ahmad (3)
- Player of the series: Shivam Dube (Ind)

The Afghanistan cricket team toured India in January 2024 to play three Twenty20 International (T20I) matches. The series marked the first time these nations engaged in a multi-match white-ball series as prior to this series, the Afghan cricket team had visited India to play a one-off test match with the Indian cricket team in 2018. The series formed part of both teams' preparation for the 2024 ICC Men's T20 World Cup.

== Squads ==
India	Afghanistan
Rohit Sharma (c); Ravi Bishnoi; Shivam Dube; Shubman Gill; Yashasvi Jaiswal; Avesh Khan; Virat Kohli; Mukesh Kumar; Axar Patel; Sanju Samson (wk); Jitesh Sharma (wk); Arshdeep Singh; Rinku Singh; Washington Sundar; Tilak Varma; Kuldeep Yadav	Ibrahim Zadran (c); Fareed Ahmad; Noor Ahmad; Qais Ahmad; Ikram Alikhil (wk); Sharafuddin Ashraf; Fazalhaq Farooqi; Rahmanullah Gurbaz (wk); Naveen-ul-Haq; Karim Janat; ~~Rashid Khan~~; Gulbadin Naib; Mohammad Nabi; Azmatullah Omarzai; Mujeeb Ur Rahman; Mohammad Saleem; Rahmat Shah; Najibullah Zadran; Hazratullah Zazai

On 10 January 2024, Rashid Khan was ruled out of Afghanistan's squad because of not recovering from a lower-back surgery.

== T20I Series ==
=== 1st T20I ===
11 January 2024
19:00 (N)
Scorecard

Afghanistan; 158/5 (20 overs)	v	India; 159/4 (17.3 overs)
Mohammad Nabi 42 (27); Axar Patel 2/23 (4 overs)		Shivam Dube 60* (40); Mujeeb Ur Rahman 2/21 (4 overs)

India won by 6 wickets
Inderjit Singh Bindra Stadium, Mohali
Umpires: Jayaraman Madanagopal (Ind) and Rohan Pandit (Ind)
Player of the match: Shivam Dube (Ind)

- India won the toss and elected to field.
- Rahmat Shah (Afg) made his T20I debut.

=== 2nd T20I ===
14 January 2024
19:00 (N)
Scorecard

Afghanistan; 172 (20 overs)	v	India; 173/4 (15.4 overs)
Gulbadin Naib 57 (35); Arshdeep Singh 3/32 (4 overs)		Yashasvi Jaiswal 68 (34); Karim Janat 2/13 (2 overs)

India won by 6 wickets
Holkar Stadium, Indore
Umpires: Rohan Pandit (Ind) and Virender Sharma (Ind)
Player of the match: Axar Patel (Ind)

- India won the toss and elected to field.
- Rohit Sharma (Ind) became the first male cricketer to play 150 T20Is.

=== 3rd T20I ===
17 January 2024
19:00 (N)
Scorecard

India; 212/4 (20 overs)	v	Afghanistan; 212/6 (20 overs)
Rohit Sharma 121* (69); Fareed Ahmad 3/20 (4 overs)		Gulbadin Naib 55* (23); Washington Sundar 3/18 (3 overs)

Match tied
(India won the second Super Over)
M. Chinnaswamy Stadium, Bangalore
Umpires: Jayaraman Madanagopal (Ind) and Virender Sharma (Ind)
Player of the match: Rohit Sharma (Ind)

- India won the toss and elected to bat.
- Mohammad Saleem (Afg) made his T20I debut.
- Rohit Sharma (Ind) became the first batter to score 5 centuries in T20Is.
- Rohit Sharma equalled MS Dhoni's record for most wins as captain in T20Is.
- 1st Super Over: Afghanistan 16/1, India 16/0
- 2nd Super Over: India 11/2, Afghanistan 1/2
- This was first time a match had been decided by a second Super Over in international cricket history.
