= Indian cricket team in Ireland in 2023 =

International cricket tour

India men's cricket team in Ireland in 2023
	Ireland	India
- Dates: 18 – 23 August 2023
Captains	Paul Stirling	Jasprit Bumrah

Twenty20 International series
- Results: India won the 3-match series 2–0
Most runs	Andrew Balbirnie (76)	Ruturaj Gaikwad (77)
Most wickets	Craig Young (3)	Jasprit Bumrah (4); Ravi Bishnoi (4); Prasidh Krishna (4)
- Player of the series: Jasprit Bumrah (Ind)

The India men's cricket team toured Ireland in August 2023 to play three Twenty20 International (T20I) matches. In March 2023, Cricket Ireland (CI) released the tour itinerary, with all the matches to be played in Malahide. On 27 June 2023, Cricket Ireland announced the schedule of the tour. India won the series 2–0, with the third and the last match of the series being washed-out.

== Squads ==
Ireland	India
Paul Stirling (c); Mark Adair; Ross Adair; Andrew Balbirnie; Curtis Campher; Gareth Delany; George Dockrell; Fionn Hand; Josh Little; Barry McCarthy; Harry Tector; Lorcan Tucker (wk); Ben White; Theo van Woerkom; Craig Young	Jasprit Bumrah (c); Ruturaj Gaikwad (vc); Shahbaz Ahmed; Ravi Bishnoi; Shivam Dube; Yashasvi Jaiswal; Prasidh Krishna; Mukesh Kumar; Avesh Khan; Sanju Samson (wk); Arshdeep Singh; Rinku Singh; Ishan Kishan (wk); Washington Sundar; Tilak Varma

== T20I series ==
=== 1st T20I ===
18 August 2023
15:00
Scorecard

Ireland; 139/7 (20 overs)	v	India; 47/2 (6.5 overs)
Barry McCarthy 51* (33); Ravi Bishnoi 2/23 (4 overs)		Yashasvi Jaiswal 24 (23); Craig Young 2/2 (0.5 overs)

India won by 2 runs (DLS method)
The Village, Dublin
Umpires: Roland Black (Ire) and Mark Hawthorne (Ire)
Player of the match: Jasprit Bumrah (Ind)

- India won the toss and elected to field.
- No further play was possible due to rain.
- Jasprit Bumrah captained India for the first time in T20Is.
- Prasidh Krishna and Rinku Singh (Ind) both made their T20I debuts.

=== 2nd T20I ===
20 August 2023
15:00
Scorecard

India; 185/5 (20 overs)	v	Ireland; 152/8 (20 overs)
Ruturaj Gaikwad 58 (43); Barry McCarthy 2/36 (4 overs)		Andrew Balbirnie 72 (51); Jasprit Bumrah 2/15 (4 overs)

India won by 33 runs
The Village, Dublin
Umpires: Roland Black (Ire) and Paul Reynolds (Ire)
Player of the match: Rinku Singh (Ind)

- Ireland won the toss and elected to field.
- Arshdeep Singh (Ind) took his 50th wicket in T20Is.
- Andrew Balbirnie (Ire) scored his 2,000th run in T20Is.

=== 3rd T20I ===
23 August 2023
15:00
Scorecard

Ireland	v	India

Match abandoned
The Village, Dublin
Umpires: Jareth McCready (Ire) and Paul Reynolds (Ire)

- No toss.
- No play was possible due to rain.
