= Indian cricket team against Afghanistan in India in 2026 =

International cricket tour

	Afghanistan	India
- Dates: 13 September – 17 September 2026
Captains	Ibrahim Zadran	Shreyas Iyer

Twenty20 International series
- Results: India won the 3-match series 3–0
Most runs	Azmatullah Omarzai (92)	Abhishek Sharma (229)
Most wickets	Rashid Khan (4)	Nitish Kumar Reddy (6)
- Player of the series: Abhishek Sharma (Ind)

The India cricket team played against the Afghanistan cricket team in September 2026, in three Twenty20 International (T20I) matches. The series, officially known as the Friendship Cup, formed part of Afghanistan's multi-format bilateral cycle in India, with Afghanistan designated as the official host team for the T20I leg, even though all matches took place at the Arun Jaitley Cricket Stadium in New Delhi.

== Squads ==
Afghanistan	India
Ibrahim Zadran (c); Noor Ahmad; Abdullah Ahmadzai; Sediqullah Atal; Fazalhaq Farooqi; Rahmanullah Gurbaz (wk); Naveen-ul-Haq; Rashid Khan; Nangeyalia Kharote; Mohammad Nabi; Gulbadin Naib; Azmatullah Omarzai; Noor ul Rahman (wk); Mujeeb Ur Rahman; Darwish Rasooli	Shreyas Iyer (c); Tilak Varma (vc); Ravi Bishnoi; Jasprit Bumrah; Varun Chakaravarthy; Shivam Dube; Ishan Kishan (wk); Axar Patel; ~~Harshit Rana~~; Nitish Kumar Reddy; Sanju Samson (wk); Abhishek Sharma; Arshdeep Singh; Vaibhav Sooryavanshi; Washington Sundar; Yash Thakur

On 10 September 2026, Harshit Rana was ruled out due to a strain injury and was replaced by Yash Thakur.

== T20I series ==
=== 1st T20I ===
13 September 2026
19:00 (N)
Scorecard

Afghanistan; 156/8 (20 overs)	v	India; 157/3 (13.4 overs)
Azmatullah Omarzai 64* (44); Arshdeep Singh 3/19 (4 overs)		Abhishek Sharma 82 (32); Mohammad Nabi 2/28 (3 overs)

India won by 7 wickets
Arun Jaitley Cricket Stadium, New Delhi
Umpires: Farooq Khan (Afg) and Ahmed Shah Pakteen (Afg)
Player of the match: Abhishek Sharma (Ind)

- India won the toss and elected to field.

=== 2nd T20I ===
15 September 2026
19:00 (N)
Scorecard

Afghanistan; 159/8 (20 overs)	v	India; 163/3 (14.5 overs)
Ibrahim Zadran 37 (33); Nitish Kumar Reddy 3/24 (3 overs)		Sanju Samson 57 (22); Rashid Khan 3/36 (3.5 overs)

India won by 7 wickets
Arun Jaitley Cricket Stadium, New Delhi
Umpires: Ahmed Shah Durrani (Afg) and Izatullah Safi (Afg)
Player of the match: Nitish Kumar Reddy (Ind)

- India won the toss and elected to field.
- Mohammad Nabi (Afg) scored his 2,500th run in T20Is.

=== 3rd T20I ===
17 September 2026
19:00 (N)
Scorecard

India; 221/7 (20 overs)	v	Afghanistan; 94 (14.1 overs)
Abhishek Sharma 108 (34); Azmatullah Omarzai 2/27 (3 overs)		Ibrahim Zadran 25 (16); Nitish Kumar Reddy 3/25 (4 overs)

India won by 127 runs
Arun Jaitley Cricket Stadium, New Delhi
Umpires: Ahmed Shah Durrani (Afg) and Ahmed Shah Pakteen (Afg)
Player of the match: Abhishek Sharma (Ind)

- Afghanistan won the toss and elected to field.
- Noor ul Rahman (Afg) made his T20I debut.
- Abhishek Sharma (Ind) scored the fastest century by a full member nation batter in T20Is.
- This was Afghanistan's biggest defeat by runs in T20Is.
