= Indian cricket team in South Africa in 2024–25 =

International cricket tour

	South Africa	India
- Dates: 8 – 15 November 2024
Captains	Aiden Markram	Suryakumar Yadav

Twenty20 International series
- Results: India won the 4-match series 3–1
Most runs	Tristan Stubbs (113)	Tilak Varma (280)
Most wickets	Gerald Coetzee (4)	Varun Chakravarthy (12)
- Player of the series: Tilak Varma (Ind)

The Indian cricket team toured South Africa in November 2024 to play four Twenty20 International (T20I) matches against South Africa cricket team. In June 2024, both Cricket South Africa (CSA) and Board of Control for Cricket in India (BCCI) confirmed the fixtures for the tour.

== Squads ==
South Africa	India
Aiden Markram (c); Ottniel Baartman; Gerald Coetzee; Donovan Ferreira; Reeza Hendricks; Marco Jansen; Heinrich Klaasen (wk); Patrick Kruger; Keshav Maharaj; David Miller; Mihlali Mpongwana; Nqaba Peter; Ryan Rickelton (wk); Andile Simelane; Lutho Sipamla (Note: In squad for third and fourth T20I only.); Tristan Stubbs (wk)	Suryakumar Yadav (c); Ravi Bishnoi; Varun Chakravarthy; Yash Dayal; Avesh Khan; Hardik Pandya; Axar Patel; Sanju Samson (wk); Abhishek Sharma; Jitesh Sharma (wk); Arshdeep Singh; Ramandeep Singh; Rinku Singh; Tilak Varma; Vijaykumar Vyshak

== T20I series ==
=== 1st T20I ===
8 November 2024
17:00 (N)
Scorecard

India; 202/8 (20 overs)	v	South Africa; 141 (17.5 overs)
Sanju Samson 107 (50); Gerald Coetzee 3/37 (4 overs)		Heinrich Klaasen 25 (22); Varun Chakravarthy 3/25 (4 overs)

India won by 61 runs
Kingsmead Cricket Ground, Durban
Umpires: Lubabalo Gcuma (SA) and Stephen Harris (SA)
Player of the match: Sanju Samson (Ind)

- South Africa won the toss and elected to field.
- Andile Simelane (SA) made his T20I debut.
- Sanju Samson became the first Indian batsman to hit two consecutive centuries in T20Is.

=== 2nd T20I ===
10 November 2024
16:00 (D/N)
Scorecard

India; 124/6 (20 overs)	v	South Africa; 128/7 (19 overs)
Hardik Pandya 39* (45); Aiden Markram 1/4 (1 over)		Tristan Stubbs 47* (41); Varun Chakravarthy 5/17 (4 overs)

South Africa won by 3 wickets
St George's Park Cricket Ground, Gqeberha
Umpires: Lubabalo Gcuma (SA) and Arno Jacobs (SA)
Player of the match: Tristan Stubbs (SA)

- South Africa won the toss and elected to field.
- Varun Chakravarthy (Ind) took his first five-wicket haul in T20Is.

=== 3rd T20I ===
13 November 2024
17:00 (N)
Scorecard

India; 219/6 (20 overs)	v	South Africa; 208/7 (20 overs)
Tilak Varma 107* (56); Andile Simelane 2/34 (3 overs)		Marco Jansen 54 (17); Arshdeep Singh 3/37 (4 overs)

India won by 11 runs
Centurion Park, Centurion
Umpires: Arno Jacobs (SA) and Allahudien Paleker (SA)
Player of the match: Tilak Varma (Ind)

- South Africa won the toss and elected to field.
- Ramandeep Singh (Ind) made his T20I debut.
- Tilak Varma (Ind) scored his first century in T20Is.

=== 4th T20I ===
15 November 2024
17:00 (N)
Scorecard

India; 283/1 (20 overs)	v	South Africa; 148 (18.2 overs)
Tilak Varma 120* (47); Lutho Sipamla 1/58 (4 overs)		Tristan Stubbs 43 (29); Arshdeep Singh 3/20 (3 overs)

India won by 135 runs
Wanderers Stadium, Johannesburg
Umpires: Stephen Harris (SA) and Allahudien Paleker (SA)
Player of the match: Tilak Varma (Ind)

- India won the toss and elected to bat.
- Sanju Samson and Tilak Varma (Ind) became the first pair from full member nations to score centuries in a single innings in T20Is.
- Sanju Samson and Tilak Varma also recorded the highest 2nd-wicket partnership (210*) in T20Is.
- Sanju Samson also became the first-ever batter in T20I cricket to hit three centuries in a calendar year.
- India recorded the most sixes (23) in a T20I innings between two full member sides.
- Tilak Varma became the second Indian batsman to hit two consecutive centuries in T20Is.
