= Indian cricket team in Zimbabwe in 2024 =

International cricket tour

| | Zimbabwe | India |
- Dates: 6 – 14 July 2024
| Captains | Sikandar Raza | Shubman Gill |

Twenty20 International series
- Results: India won the 5-match series 4–1
| Most runs | Dion Myers (134) | Shubman Gill (170) |
| Most wickets | Blessing Muzarabani (6); Sikandar Raza (6) | Mukesh Kumar (8); Washington Sundar (8) |
- Player of the series: Washington Sundar (Ind)

The Indian cricket team toured Zimbabwe in July 2024 to play five Twenty20 International (T20I) matches. In February 2024, the Zimbabwe Cricket (ZC) confirmed the fixtures for the tour.

== Squads ==
| Zimbabwe | India |
|---|---|
| Sikandar Raza (c); Faraz Akram; Brian Bennett; Johnathan Campbell; Tendai Chatara; Luke Jongwe; Innocent Kaia; Clive Madande (wk); Wesley Madhevere; Tadiwanashe Marumani; Wellington Masakadza; Brandon Mavuta; Blessing Muzarabani; Dion Myers; Antum Naqvi; Richard Ngarava; Milton Shumba | Shubman Gill (c); Khaleel Ahmed; Ravi Bishnoi; Tushar Deshpande; Shivam Dube; Ruturaj Gaikwad; Yashasvi Jaiswal; Dhruv Jurel (wk); Avesh Khan; Mukesh Kumar; Riyan Parag; Harshit Rana; Sanju Samson (wk); Abhishek Sharma; Jitesh Sharma (wk); Rinku Singh; Sai Sudharsan; Washington Sundar |

On 26 June 2024, Nitish Kumar Reddy was ruled out due to injury and was replaced by Shivam Dube. Harshit Rana, Jitesh Sharma and Sai Sudharsan were named as replacements for Shivam Dube, Yashasvi Jaiswal and Sanju Samson for the first two T20Is.

== T20I series ==
=== 1st T20I ===
6 July 2024
13:00
Scorecard

| Zimbabwe; 115/9 (20 overs) | v | India; 102 (19.5 overs) |
| Clive Madande 29* (25); Ravi Bishnoi 4/13 (4 overs) | | Shubman Gill 31 (29); Tendai Chatara 3/16 (3.5 overs) |

Zimbabwe won by 13 runs
Harare Sports Club Ground, Harare
Umpires: Iknow Chabi (Zim) and Forster Mutizwa (Zim)
Player of the match: Sikandar Raza (Zim)

- India won the toss and elected to field.
- Shubman Gill captained India for the first time in T20Is.
- Dhruv Jurel, Riyan Parag and Abhishek Sharma (Ind) all made their T20I debuts.

=== 2nd T20I ===
7 July 2024
13:00
Scorecard

| India; 234/2 (20 overs) | v | Zimbabwe; 134 (18.4 overs) |
| Abhishek Sharma 100 (47); Wellington Masakadza 1/29 (2 overs) | | Wesley Madhevere 43 (39); Avesh Khan 3/15 (3 overs) |

India won by 100 runs
Harare Sports Club Ground, Harare
Umpires: Forster Mutizwa (Zim) and Langton Rusere (Zim)
Player of the match: Abhishek Sharma (Ind)

- India won the toss and elected to bat.
- Sai Sudharsan (Ind) made his T20I debut.
- Abhishek Sharma (Ind) scored his maiden century in T20Is.
- This was the joint-biggest defeat by margin of runs for Zimbabwe in T20Is.

=== 3rd T20I ===
10 July 2024
13:00
Scorecard

| India; 182/4 (20 overs) | v | Zimbabwe; 159/6 (20 overs) |
| Shubman Gill 66 (49); Sikandar Raza 2/24 (4 overs) | | Dion Myers 65* (49); Washington Sundar 3/15 (4 overs) |

India won by 23 runs
Harare Sports Club Ground, Harare
Umpires: Langton Rusere (Zim) and Percival Sizara (Zim)
Player of the match: Washington Sundar (Ind)

- India won the toss and elected to bat.
- Sikandar Raza (Zim) scored his 5,000th run in T20s.
- This was India's 150th victory in T20Is.

=== 4th T20I ===
13 July 2024
13:00
Scorecard

| Zimbabwe; 152/7 (20 overs) | v | India; 156/0 (15.2 overs) |
| Sikandar Raza 46 (28); Khaleel Ahmed 2/32 (4 overs) | | Yashasvi Jaiswal 93* (53) |

India won by 10 wickets
Harare Sports Club Ground, Harare
Umpires: Iknow Chabi (Zim) and Forster Mutizwa (Zim)
Player of the match: Yashasvi Jaiswal (Ind)

- India won the toss and elected to field.
- Tushar Deshpande (Ind) made his T20I debut.
- Sikandar Raza became the first Zimbabwean cricketer to score 2,000 runs in T20Is.

=== 5th T20I ===
14 July 2024
13:00
Scorecard

| India; 167/6 (20 overs) | v | Zimbabwe; 125 (18.3 overs) |
| Sanju Samson 58 (45); Blessing Muzarabani 2/19 (4 overs) | | Dion Myers 34 (32); Mukesh Kumar 4/22 (3.3 overs) |

India won by 42 runs
Harare Sports Club Ground, Harare
Umpires: Iknow Chabi (Zim) and Forster Mutizwa (Zim)
Player of the match: Shivam Dube (Ind)

- Zimbabwe won the toss and elected to field.
