= Naman Ojha =

Indian cricketer

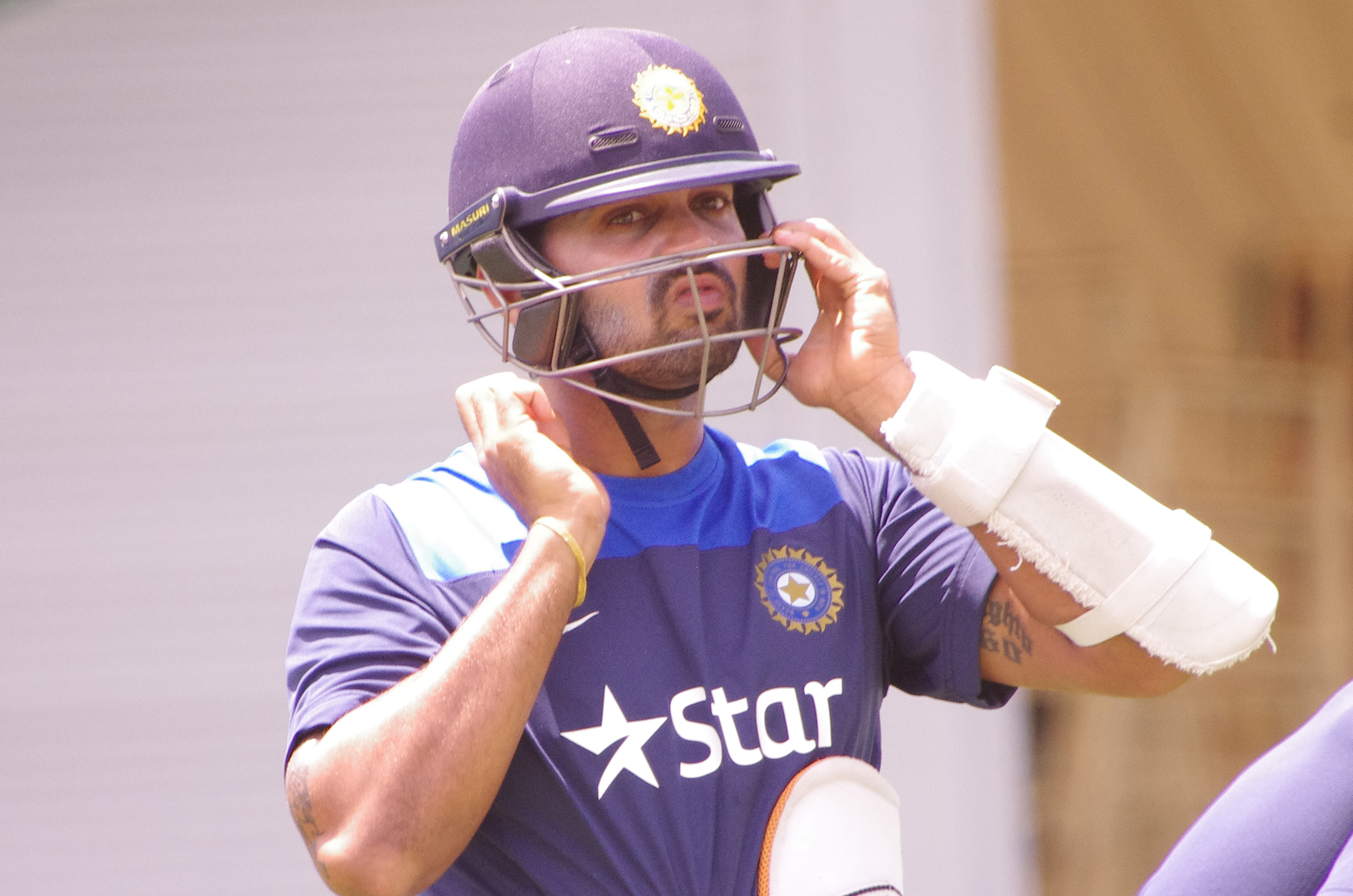

Personal information
- Full name: Naman Vinayakumar Ojha
- Born: 20 July 1983 (age 43); Ujjain, Madhya Pradesh
- Batting: Right-handed
- Role: Wicket-keeper batsman

International information
- National side: India (2010–2015)
- Only Test (cap 285): 28 August 2015 v Sri Lanka
- Only ODI (cap 186): 5 June 2010 v Sri Lanka
- ODI shirt no.: 30
- T20I debut (cap 32): 12 June 2010 v Zimbabwe
- Last T20I: 13 June 2010 v Zimbabwe

Domestic team information
- Years: Team
- 2001-2021: Madhya Pradesh (squad no. 30)
- 2009–2010: Rajasthan Royals (squad no. 30)
- 2011–2013: Delhi Daredevils (squad no. 30)
- 2014–2017: Sunrisers Hyderabad (squad no. 53)
- 2018: Delhi Daredevils (squad no. 48)
- 2021: India Legends

Career statistics
Competition	Test	ODI	T20I	FC
Matches	1	1	2	146
Runs scored	56	1	12	9,753
Batting average	28.00	1.00	6.00	41.67
100s/50s	0/0	0/0	0/0	22/55
Top score	35	1	10	219*
Catches/stumpings	4/1	0/1	0/0	417/54
- Source: ESPNcricinfo, 15 February 2021

Naman Vinaykumar Ojha (born 20 July 1983) is an Indian former cricketer. He made his Test debut for India against Sri Lanka on 28 August 2015. He retired from all formats of cricket on 15 February 2021.

Naman Ojha was named as the captain of the India A team, which took part in the two unofficial 'Tests' and a four-nation one-day tournament, in Australia in 2016. During Australia tour with India A team in 2014 he struck a double hundred and a hundred in a four-day match.

A capable top-order batsman and wicketkeeper, Ojha made his first-class debut for Madhya Pradesh in 2000–01.

He represented Rajasthan Royals in the 2009 Indian Premier League in South Africa. He opened the batting for the Rajasthan Royals and played some important innings. He scored two half centuries and hit 11 sixes in the tournament. He also plays for Indore in Madhya Pradesh T20 League.

In July 2014, playing for India A in an unofficial test, Naman scored an unbeaten 219 that included 29 boundaries and 8 sixes at Brisbane. In June 2016, in his next tour to Australia representing India A, Naman was named the captain.

== Domestic career ==
Ojha made his first-class debut for Madhya Pradesh in 2000/01. He has tasted success in the limited-overs format and in the 2008/09 Challenger Trophy scored 96 for India Green.

Rajasthan Royals came calling during the second season of the Indian Premier League (IPL) and in his second game smashed a half-century.

In November 2013, Ojha hit the tenth century of his first-class career in Madhya Pradesh's first innings against Bengal. This was Ojha's first fifty-plus score in 13 innings.

The last time he had hit a fifty-plus score in first-class cricket was also against Bengal in the last season when he was stumped on 99.

In March 2014, Ojha scored 94 nearly guided Madhya Pradesh to victory, but tight bowling from Railways resulted in MP falling eight runs short.

Ojha scored unbeaten 65 guided Central Zone to a win in a tricky chase against East Zone in the quarterfinals of the Deodhar Trophy.

In 2014 IPL auctions, he was signed by Sunrisers Hyderabad for a fee of 83 lakhs Indian rupees. Sunrisers Hyderabad had been searching for an Indian batsman to support their big-name top order and he had 79 off 36.

Sandeep Sharma's medium pace enabled him to drive Sunrisers Hyderabad past the 200-mark. The 26 runs that came in the 19th over meant Sandeep's 1 for 65 became the joint second-worst figures in IPL.

In his 100th first-class match Ojha scored hundred in both innings while playing for India A against Australia A at Allan Border Field, Brisbane, in July 2014. He scored a double century in the first innings and added 122 runs with Nos. 10 and 11, whose combined contributions to those two partnerships was 11 runs, before India A declared on 9 for 475. Naman's unbeaten 219 came off 250 balls, with 29 fours and eight sixes. After reaching his 100, he scored 119 runs in 114 balls.

In January 2018, he was bought by the Delhi Daredevils in the 2018 IPL auction.

== International career ==
Ojha's senior debut came when he was included as a back-up wicket-keeper in the T20I team for India's 2010 tour of Zimbabwe and an ODI Tri-series on the same tour, when the selectors decided to rest several senior players including wicket-keeper Mahendra Singh Dhoni. His Test debut came at the age of 32, in August 2015, in the third Test of India's tour of Sri Lanka, after wicket-keeper Wriddhiman Saha had to sit out due to a hamstring injury. Ojha finished the Test with 56 runs, four catches and one stumping.
