= Indian cricket team in Zimbabwe in 2010 =

| | India | Zimbabwe |
- Dates: 28 May – 13 June 2010
| Captains | Suresh Raina | Elton Chigumbura |

Twenty20 International series
- Results: India won the 2-match series 2–0
| Most runs | Suresh Raina (100) | Tatenda Taibu (49) |
| Most wickets | Ashok Dinda (4) | Ray Price (3); Chris Mpofu (3) |
- Player of the series: Suresh Raina (Ind)

The Indian cricket team toured Zimbabwe from 28 May until 13 June 2010. The tour consisted of the Micromax Cup followed by two T20Is.

== Squads ==
Squads
| India | Zimbabwe |
|---|---|
| Suresh Raina (c) | Elton Chigumbura (c) |
| Virat Kohli (vc) | Chamu Chibhabha |
| Ravindra Jadeja | Graeme Cremer |
| Amit Mishra | Greg Lamb |
| Pragyan Ojha | Chris Mpofu |
| Yusuf Pathan | Ed Rainsford |
| Murali Vijay | Prosper Utseya |
| Umesh Yadav | Andy Blignaut |
| Ashok Dinda | Charles Coventry |
| Dinesh Karthik (wk) | Tatenda Taibu (wk) |
| Naman Ojha | Craig Ervine |
| Pankaj Singh | Hamilton Masakadza |
| Rohit Sharma | Ray Price |
| Vinay Kumar | Vusi Sibanda |
| Ravichandran Ashwin | Brendan Taylor |
| Piyush Chawla | |

== ODI Series ==
=== 1st match ===
28 May
Scorecard

| India; 285/5 (50 overs) | v | Zimbabwe; 289/4 (48.2 overs) |
| Rohit Sharma 114 (119); Christopher Mpofu 2/63 (10 overs) | | Brendan Taylor 81 (103); Vinay Kumar 2/51 (8 overs) |

Zimbabwe won by 6 wickets
Queens Sports Club, Bulawayo
Umpires: Brian Jerling (SA) and Russell Tiffin (Zim)
Player of the match: Brendan Taylor (Zim)

- India won the toss and elected to bat.
- Umesh Yadav, Vinay Kumar, Ashok Dinda (Ind), Craig Ervine (Zim) all made their ODI debuts.
- Rohit Sharma (Ind) scored his first century in ODIs.

=== 2nd match ===
30 May
Scorecard

| Sri Lanka; 242 (49.5 overs) | v | India; 243/3 (43.3 overs) |
| Angelo Mathews 75 (95); Ashok Dinda 2/44 (9.5 overs) | | Rohit Sharma 101* (100); Nuwan Kulasekara 1/34 (9 overs) |

India won by 7 wickets
Queens Sports Club, Bulawayo
Umpires: Brian Jerling (SA) and Russell Tiffin (Zim)
Player of the match: Rohit Sharma (Ind)

- India won the toss and elected to field.

=== 4th match ===
3 June
Scorecard

| India; 194/9 (50 overs) | v | Zimbabwe; 197/3 (38.2 overs) |
| Ravindra Jadeja 51 (72); Greg Lamb 3/45 (10 overs) | | Brendan Taylor 74 (90); Ravindra Jadeja 2/27 (7 overs) |

Zimbabwe won by 7 wickets
Harare Sports Club, Harare
Umpires: Owen Chirombe (Zim) and Rudi Koertzen (SA)
Player of the match: Brendan Taylor (Zim)

- Zimbabwe won the toss and elected to field.

=== 5th match ===
5 June
Scorecard

| India; 268/9 (50 overs) | v | Sri Lanka; 270/4 (48.2 overs) |
| Virat Kohli 68 (95); Thilan Thushara 3/57 (9overs) | | Dinesh Chandimal 111 (130); Ravichandran Ashwin 2/50 (10 overs) |

Sri Lanka won by 6 wickets.
Harare Sports Club, Harare
Umpires: Rudi Koertzen (SA) and Russell Tiffin (Zim)
Player of the match: Dinesh Chandimal (SL)

- Sri Lanka won the toss and elected to field.
- ODI Debuts: Ravichandran Ashwin, Naman Ojha and Pankaj Singh (Ind)

== T20I Series ==
=== 1st T20I ===
12 June
Scorecard

| Zimbabwe; 111/9 (20 overs) | v | India; 112/4 (15 overs) |
| Chamu Chibhabha 40 (30); Vinay Kumar 3/24 (3 overs) | | Yusuf Pathan 37* (24); Ray Price 2/24 (4 overs) |

India won by 6 wickets
Harare Sports Club, Harare
Umpires: Owen Chirombe (Zim) and Russell Tiffin (Zim)
Player of the match: Yusuf Pathan (Ind)

- India won the toss and elected to field.
- Ravichandran Ashwin, Virat Kohli, Naman Ojha (all Ind) and Ed Rainsford (Zim) made their T20I debuts.
- Pragyan Ojha recorded the most economical bowling figures (2/11 in 4 overs) in a complete bowling spell for India.

=== 2nd T20I ===
13 June
Scorecard

| Zimbabwe; 140/5 (20 overs) | v | India; 144/3 (18 overs) |
| Tatenda Taibu 45* (40); Ashok Dinda 2/15 (4 overs) | | Suresh Raina 72* (44); Chamu Chibhabha 1/19 (3 overs) |

India won by 7 wickets.
Harare Sports Club, Harare
Umpires: Owen Chirombe (Zim) and Russell Tiffin (Zim)
Player of the match: Suresh Raina (Ind)

- India won the toss and elected to field.
- Amit Mishra (Ind) and Tendai Chatara (Zim) made their T20I debuts.
