= 2010 Zimbabwe Tri-Nation Series =

Micromax Cup
- Date: 28 May 2010 – 9 June 2010
- Location: Zimbabwe
- Result: Sri Lanka won the series.
- Player of the series: Brendan Taylor
Teams
India	Sri Lanka	Zimbabwe
Captains
Suresh Raina	Tillakaratne Dilshan	Elton Chigumbura
Most runs
Rohit Sharma 260	Tillakaratne Dilshan 328	Brendan Taylor 295
Most wickets
Ravindra Jadeja 5	Suraj Randiv 6	Chris Mpofu 4

The Tri-nation series in Zimbabwe in 2010 (known as Micromax Cup and Zimbabwe Triangular Series 2010 too) was the name of the One Day International cricket tournament in Zimbabwe that was between India, Sri Lanka and Zimbabwe. The Zimbabwean boards expected better sponsorship offers with Indian cricket team involved. Sri Lanka won the series by beating Zimbabwe in the finals.

== Squads ==
Squads
India	Sri Lanka	Zimbabwe
Suresh Raina (c)	Tillakaratne Dilshan (c)	Elton Chigumbura (c)
Virat Kohli (vc)	Angelo Mathews (vc)	Chamu Chibhabha
Ravindra Jadeja	Suraj Randiv	Graeme Cremer
Amit Mishra	Nuwan Kulasekara	Greg Lamb
Pragyan Ojha	Jeewan Mendis	Chris Mpofu
Yusuf Pathan	Thilan Samaraweera	Ed Rainsford
Murali Vijay	Upul Tharanga	Prosper Utseya
Umesh Yadav	Thilan Thushara	Andy Blignaut
Ashok Dinda	Thissara Perera	Charles Coventry
Dinesh Karthik (wk)	Dinesh Chandimal (wk)	Tatenda Taibu (wk)
Naman Ojha	Dilhara Fernando	Craig Ervine
Pankaj Singh	Chamara Kapugedera	Hamilton Masakadza
Rohit Sharma	Ajantha Mendis	Ray Price
Vinay Kumar	Chamara Silva	Vusi Sibanda
Ravichandran Ashwin	Lahiru Thirimanne	Brendan Taylor

== Points table ==
Pos	Team	Pld	W	L	T	NR	BP	Pts	NRR
1	Zimbabwe	4	3	1	0	0	1	13	0.214
2	Sri Lanka	4	2	2	0	0	1	9	0.104
3	India	4	1	3	0	0	0	4	−0.278

== Group stage ==
=== Round 1 ===
28 May
Scorecard

India; 285/5 (50 overs)	v	Zimbabwe; 289/4 (48.2 overs)
Rohit Sharma 114 (119); Christopher Mpofu 2/63 (10 overs)		Brendan Taylor 81 (103); Vinay Kumar 2/51 (8 overs)

Zimbabwe won by 6 wickets
Queens Sports Club, Bulawayo
Umpires: Brian Jerling (SA) and Russell Tiffin (Zim)
Player of the match: Brendan Taylor (Zim)

- India won the toss and elected to bat.
- ODI Debuts: Umesh Yadav, Vinay Kumar, Ashok Dinda (Ind), Craig Ervine (Zim)
- Rohit Sharma (Ind) scored his first century in ODIs.

30 May
Scorecard

Sri Lanka; 242 (49.5 overs)	v	India; 243/3 (43.3 overs)
Angelo Mathews 75 (95); Ashok Dinda 2/44 (9.5 overs)		Rohit Sharma 101* (100); Nuwan Kulasekara 1/34 (9 overs)

India won by 7 wickets
Queens Sports Club, Bulawayo
Umpires: Brian Jerling (SA) and Russell Tiffin (Zim)
Player of the match: Rohit Sharma (Ind)

- India won the toss and elected to field.

1 June
Scorecard

Zimbabwe; 118 (24.5 overs)	v	Sri Lanka; 119/1 (15.2 overs)
Hamilton Masakadza 62 (69); Suraj Randiv 3/23 (5 overs)		Tillakaratne Dilshan 60* (45); Graeme Cremer 0/11 (1 over)

Sri Lanka won by 9 wickets
Queens Sports Club, Bulawayo
Umpires: Owen Chirombe (Zim) and Rudi Koertzen (SA)
Player of the match: Suraj Randiv (SL)

- Sri Lanka won the toss and elected to field.
- Rain reduced play to 26 overs.
- ODI Debuts: Dinesh Chandimal, Jeewan Mendis (SL)

=== Round 2 ===
3 June
Scorecard

India; 194/9 (50 overs)	v	Zimbabwe; 197/3 (38.2 overs)
Ravindra Jadeja 51 (72); Greg Lamb 3/45 (10 overs)		Brendan Taylor 74 (90); Ravindra Jadeja 2/27 (7 overs)

Zimbabwe won by 7 wickets
Harare Sports Club, Harare
Umpires: Owen Chirombe (Zim) and Rudi Koertzen (SA)
Player of the match: Brendan Taylor (Zim)

- Zimbabwe won the toss and elected to field.

5 June
Scorecard

India; 268/9 (50 overs)	v	Sri Lanka; 270/4 (48.2 overs)
Virat Kohli 68 (95); Thilan Thushara 3/57 (9overs)		Dinesh Chandimal 111 (130); Ravichandran Ashwin 2/50 (10 overs)

Sri Lanka won by 6 wickets.
Harare Sports Club, Harare
Umpires: Rudi Koertzen (SA) and Russell Tiffin (Zim)
Player of the match: Dinesh Chandimal (SL)

- Sri Lanka won the toss and elected to field.
- ODI Debuts: Ravichandran Ashwin, Naman Ojha and Pankaj Singh (Ind)

7 June
Scorecard

Sri Lanka; 236 (47.5 overs)	v	Zimbabwe; 240/2 (47.5 overs)
Tillakaratne Dilshan 78 (84); Chris Mpofu 2/32 (9 overs)		Brendan Taylor 119 (137); Tillakaratne Dilshan 1/35 (8 overs)

Zimbabwe won by 8 wickets
Harare Sports Club, Harare
Umpires: Rudi Koertzen (SA) and Russell Tiffin (Zim)
Player of the match: Brendan Taylor (Zim)

- Zimbabwe won the toss and elected to field.

== Final ==
9 June
Scorecard

Zimbabwe; 199 (49 overs)	v	Sri Lanka; 203/1 (34.4 overs)
Tatenda Taibu 71 (93); Dilhara Fernando 3/36 (9 overs)		Tillakaratne Dilshan 108* (102); Hamilton Masakadza 0/8 (1 over)

Sri Lanka won by 9 wickets.
Harare Sports Club, Harare
Umpires: Rudi Koertzen (SA) and Russell Tiffin (Zim)
Player of the match: Tillakaratne Dilshan (SL)

- Sri Lanka won the toss and elected to field.

== Media coverage ==
=== Television ===
- Ten Sports : India, Sri Lanka, Bangladesh, Pakistan, Europe, Japan, Hong Kong in China, Indonesia, Maldives and Nepal.
- Doordarshan : India
- Zee Cinema : India
- Prime Sports : Middle East
- SuperSport : Africa
- Setanta Sports : Australia
- Asian Television Network : Canada
- StarHub : Singapore
- Astro : Malaysia
- CMC : Guyana, Barbados, Grenada, Jamaica, St Lucia, Antigua, Trinidad and Cayman Islands.

=== Internet ===
- Ten Sports – (tensports.com)
