= Ramandeep Singh (cricketer) =

Indian cricketer (born 1997)

Personal information
- Born: 13 April 1997 (age 29); Chandigarh, India
- Batting: Right-handed
- Bowling: Right-arm medium
- Role: Middle-order batter
- Relatives: Charlie Chauhan (m. 2026)

International information
- National side: India (2024)
- T20I debut (cap 118): 13 November 2024 v South Africa
- Last T20I: 15 November 2024 v South Africa

Domestic team information
- Years: Team
- 2016/17–present: Punjab
- 2022: Mumbai Indians
- 2024–present: Kolkata Knight Riders

Career statistics
Competition	T20I	FC	LA	T20
Matches	2	7	40	99
Runs scored	15	247	709	1012
Batting average	15.00	24.70	33.76	22.48
100s/50s	0/0	0/1	0/4	0/2
Top score	15	69*	80	64
Balls bowled	20	270	382	482
Wickets	1	2	8	34
Bowling average	42.00	93.50	54.00	21.35
5 wickets in innings	0	0	1	0
10 wickets in match	0	0	0	0
Best bowling	1/42	1/38	5/17	3/20
Catches/stumpings	1/–	5/–	16/–	49/–
- Source: Cricinfo, 8 August 2026

Ramandeep Singh (born 13 April 1997) is an Indian cricketer who bats right-handed and bowls right-arm medium pace. He played two Twenty20 International for the Indian national team in 2024, and represents Punjab in domestic cricket and Kolkata Knight Riders in the Indian Premier League.

== Career ==
Singh made his Twenty20 debut for Punjab in the 2016–17 Inter State Twenty-20 Tournament on 29 January 2017. He made his List A debut on 5 October 2019, for Punjab in the 2019–20 Vijay Hazare Trophy. He made his first-class debut on 12 February 2020, for Punjab in the 2019–20 Ranji Trophy. In February 2022, he was bought by the Mumbai Indians in the auction for the 2022 Indian Premier League tournament. Ramandeep has won the Indian Premier League playing for Kolkata Knight Riders in 2024.

Singh made his Twenty20 International debut for India against South Africa on 13 November 2024, and played his second T20I on 15 November 2024.

== Personal life ==
On 7 August 2026, Singh married Indian actress Charlie Chauhan in a traditional Sikh wedding ceremony at a gurdwara, following an eight-year relationship.
