= Rinku Singh (cricketer) =

Indian cricketer (born 1997)

Personal information
- Full name: Rinku Khanchand Singh
- Born: 12 October 1997 (age 29); Aligarh, Uttar Pradesh, India
- Height: 1.66 m (5 ft 5 in)
- Batting: Left-handed
- Bowling: Right-arm off break
- Role: Middle-order batter

International information
- National side: India (2023–present)
- ODI debut (cap 254): 19 December 2023 v South Africa
- Last ODI: 21 December 2023 v South Africa
- ODI shirt no.: 35
- T20I debut (cap 107): 18 August 2023 v Ireland
- Last T20I: 22 February 2026 v South Africa
- T20I shirt no.: 35

Domestic team information
- Years: Team
- 2014–present: Uttar Pradesh
- 2017: Punjab Kings
- 2018–present: Kolkata Knight Riders

Career statistics
Competition	ODI	T20I	FC	T20
Matches	2	45	52	177
Runs scored	55	665	3,677	3,441
Batting average	27.50	39.11	59.30	34.06
100s/50s	0/0	0/3	9/22	0/18
Top score	38	69*	176	79
Balls bowled	6	16	594	86
Wickets	1	3	7	5
Bowling average	2.00	6.33	48.28	26.80
5 wickets in innings	0	0	0	0
10 wickets in match	0	0	0	0
Best bowling	1/2	2/3	2/11	2/3
Catches/stumpings	1/–	37/–	37/–	102/–
Medal record
Men's cricket
Representing India
ICC T20 World Cup
Winner	2026 India & Sri Lanka
Asia Cup
Winner	2025 UAE
Asian Games
Gold medal – first place	2022 Hangzhou
- Source: ESPNcricinfo, 28 February 2026

Rinku Khanchand Singh (born 12 October 1997) is an Indian cricketer, who plays for the India national cricket team. He is a left-handed middle order batter and an occasional right-arm off break bowler. He was a member of the Indian team that won the 2026 T20 World Cup, 2025 Asia Cup, and the gold medal at the 2022 Asian Games. He represents Uttar Pradesh in domestic cricket and Kolkata Knight Riders in the Indian Premier League.

== Early and personal life ==
Rinku Singh was born on 12 October 1997 in Aligarh, Uttar Pradesh. He is the third of five siblings. His father, Khanchand Singh, worked in a gas cylinder distribution company, and during his early years, the family lived in a two-bed room accommodation provided by his father's employer.

On 8 June 2025, Singh got engaged to politician Priya Saroj in Lucknow. In the same month, he was appointed as an officer in the state education department under the sports quota.

== Domestic career ==
Singh represented Uttar Pradesh at the under-16, under-19 and under-23 levels; and also played for Central Zone at the under-19 level. He made his List A debut for Uttar Pradesh on 5 March 2014 against Vidarbha and top-scored with 83 runs in the match. On 5 November 2016, he made his first-class debut against Hyderabad in the 2016–17 Ranji Trophy. He was the leading run-scorer for Uttar Pradesh in the 2018–19 Ranji Trophy, with 953 runs in ten matches.

== Franchise career ==
Singh was bought by Kings XI Punjab in the auction held in February 2017 ahead of the 2017 Indian Premier League. He was released a season later, and in the auction held in January 2018, he was bought by Kolkata Knight Riders for ₹8 million (equivalent to ₹12 million or US$120,000 in 2026). On 30 May 2019, he was given a three-month suspension by the Board of Control for Cricket in India after he took part in a T20 Tournament in Abu Dhabi without seeking prior permission from the board.

Singh was ruled out of the 2021 Indian Premier League due to a knee injury and was replaced by Gurkeerat Singh Mann in the Knight Riders' squad. In February 2022, he was retained by the Knight Riders ahead of the 2022 season. During the 2022 season, he earned his first Player of the Match award after he scored 42 runs in 23 balls against the Rajasthan Royals. On 9 April 2023, in a match against Gujarat Titans, he scored 29 runs including five sixes in the final over bowled by Yash Dayal, which was the highest number of runs scored in the last over to win a match in the history of the tournament.

== International career ==
Singh was part of the Indian squad that won the gold medal at the 2022 Asian Games. However, he did not make it to the playing eleven during the tournament.

On 18 August 2023, Singh made his Twenty20 International (T20I) debut in the first match of the away series against Ireland at Malahide. However, he did not get to bat in the match, and scored 38 runs in the next match. He played all five matches in the home T20I series against Australia in the November 2023 and score 105 runs at a strike rate of 175, which was the best strike rate of any Indian batter in the series. In November 2023, he was named in the Indian squad for the away series against South Africa. He scored his first T20I half-century in the second match of the series. He made his One Day International (ODI) debut on 19 December 2023 in the second match of the ODI series. He scored 17 runs and took the wicket of Rassie van der Dussen.

On 17 January 2024, in the third match of the home series against Afghanistan, he put on a 190 runs partnership with Rohit Sharma, which is India's highest partnership in T20Is. In May 2024, he was named as a reserve player in the Indian squad for the 2024 ICC Men's T20 World Cup tournament. He played five matches in the away series against Zimbabwe in July 2024 and score a half-century in the second match of the series. Subsequently, he was named in the Indian team for the away series against Sri Lanka, in which he score two runs across two innings. Though he performed better, scoring 61 runs across two innings in the home series against Bangladesh the in October 2024, he had meagre returns of 28 runs across four matches in the subsequent tour of South Africa in November 2024.

Singh played only five T20I matches for India in 2025, scoring 43 runs in three innings. This included a lone match in the final of the India's title winning campaign in the 2025 Asia Cup against Pakistan in Dubai. In January 2026, he made his return to the national side for the home series against New Zealand, and scored an unbeaten 44 runs from 20 balls, in an eventual Indian victory in the first match of the series held at Nagpur. He was subsequently named in the Indian squad for 2026 Men's T20 World Cup. However, after a series of low scores, he flew home from the tournament during the Super 8s due to a family emergency.
