= Varun Chakravarthy =

Indian cricketer (born 1991)

Personal information
- Full name: Varun Chakaravarthy Vinod
- Born: 29 August 1991 (age 35); Bidar, Karnataka, India
- Batting: Right-handed
- Bowling: Right-arm leg break googly
- Role: Bowler

International information
- National side: India (2021–present)
- ODI debut (cap 259): 9 February 2025 v England
- Last ODI: 9 March 2025 v New Zealand
- ODI shirt no.: 29
- T20I debut (cap 87): 25 July 2021 v Sri Lanka
- Last T20I: 1 November 2026 v New Zealand
- T20I shirt no.: 29

Domestic team information
- Years: Team
- 2017: Tirupur Tamizhans
- 2018: Madurai Panthers
- 2018–present: Tamil Nadu
- 2020–present: Kolkata Knight Riders
- 2022–present: Dindigul Dragons

Career statistics
Competition	ODI	T20I	LA	T20
Matches	4	50	29	150
Runs scored	–	8	121	102
Batting average	–	1.60	11.00	6.37
100s/50s	–	0/0	0/0	0/0
Top score	–	1*	32	24
Balls bowled	240	1053	1,515	3,319
Wickets	10	76	75	197
Bowling average	19.00	17.71	14.29	21.26
5 wickets in innings	1	2	5	3
10 wickets in match	0	0	0	0
Best bowling	5/42	5/17	5/9	5/17
Catches/stumpings	0/–	11/–	8/–	28/–
Medal record
Men's cricket
Representing India
ICC T20 World Cup
Winner	2026 India & Sri Lanka
ICC Champions Trophy
Winner	2025 Pakistan
ACC Asia Cup
Winner	2025 UAE
- Source: ESPNcricinfo, 2 November 2026

Varun Chakravarthy Vinod (born 29 August 1991) is an Indian international cricketer who plays for the India national team as a right-arm leg spin bowler. He represents Tamil Nadu in domestic cricket, and plays for Kolkata Knight Riders in the Indian Premier League and Dindigul Dragons in the Tamil Nadu Premier League. He was a member of the Indian team that won the 2026 T20 World Cup, 2025 Champions Trophy and the 2025 Asia Cup. In December 2025, he became the highest rated Indian bowler ever in the ICC rankings for Twenty20 Internationals with 818 points.

== Early life ==
Varun Chakravarthy Vinod was born on 29 August 1991 in Bidar, Karnataka, to Vinod Chakravarthy, an ITS officer working for BSNL, and Malini. His father is of half-Tamil and half-Malayali descent, while his mother is a Kannadiga. He was brought up in Adyar, Chennai.

Varun did his schooling at Kendriya Vidyalaya CLRI and St. Patrick's School in Chennai. He initially played cricket as a wicket-keeper but quit the sport to focus on academics. He obtained a bachelor's degree in architecture from SRM University. At the age of 25, he gave up his architect career to pursue cricket professionally. While starting out as a pace bowler, he turned to spin bowling after a knee injury in early 2017 that kept him out of action for six months.

== Domestic career ==
Varun came into the limelight during the 2018 season of the Tamil Nadu Premier League (TNPL), where his nine wickets at an economy rate of 4.70 helped Madurai Panthers win their maiden TNPL title. He made his List A debut for Tamil Nadu in the 2018-19 season of the Vijay Hazare Trophy on 20 September 2018. He was the leading wicket-taker for Tamil Nadu in the tournament, with 22 dismissals in nine matches. He made his first-class debut for Tamil Nadu in the 2018-19 edition of the Ranji Trophy on 12 November 2018.

In December 2018, Varun was bought by the Kings XI Punjab in the player auction for the 2019 season of the Indian Premier League (IPL) at the price of ₹84 million (US$900,000). He made his Twenty20 debut for the team on 27 March 2019 in a match against Kolkata Knight Riders. His first over went for 25 runs, the highest number of runs conceded by a bowler on debut in the IPL. He played just the one match in the season, and was released by the Kings XI Punjab ahead of the 2020 IPL auction. In the auction ahead of the 2020 IPL season, he was bought by the Kolkata Knight Riders for ₹40 million (US$430,000). On 24 October 2020, he took his first five-wicket haul in the IPL, with figures of 5 wickets for 20 runs, against the Delhi Capitals. He finished as the team's highest wicket-taker in the season with 17 wickets.

On 3 May 2021, Varun, and his teammate Sandeep Warrier, tested positive for COVID-19. As a result, the match between the Knight Riders and Royal Challengers Bangalore was called off, and the tournament was later suspended. Varun topped the wicket charts for the Knight Riders in the 2021, and In the 2023 IPL seasons. He was the second-highest wicket-taker in the 2024 IPL season with 21 dismissals at an average of 19.14 and economy rate of 8.04. He took 18 wickets in six matches for Tamil Nadu at the 2024–25 Vijay Hazare Trophy and finished second on the wicket-takers' list behind Arshdeep Singh.

== International career ==
In October 2020, Varun was named in India's Twenty20 International (T20I) squad for their away series against Australia. However, on 9 November 2020, he was ruled out of the series after suffering an injury. In February 2021, he was named in India's T20I squad for their home series against England, but did not make it to the playing XI. In June 2021, Varun was named in India's One Day International (ODI) and T20I squads for their away series against Sri Lanka. He made his T20I debut on 25 July 2021 in the first match of the series, and took the wicket of the Sri Lankan captain Dasun Shanaka. In September 2021, he was named in the Indian squad for the 2021 ICC Men's T20 World Cup. However, he went wicket-less in his three appearances in the tournament.

In October 2024, Varun made his international comeback after nearly three years in the first match of the T20I series against Bangladesh, and took three wickets. He took his maiden T20I five-wicket haul when he finished with figures of 5/17 in the second match of the away series against South Africa on 10 November 2024. He finished as the highest wicket taker of the series with 12 dismissals in four matches. In early 2025, he won the Player of the series award in the five-match T20I series against England, after taking 14 wickets including his second five-wicket haul (5/24) during the third match of the series. He made his ODI debut in the subsequent ODI series against England. At 33 years and 164 days old, he became the second oldest ODI debutant for India after Farokh Engineer.

In February 2025, Varun was named in India's 15-member squad for the 2025 ICC Champions Trophy. He took 5/42 in a group stage match against New Zealand, his maiden ODI five-wicket haul in his second ODI appearance. He took two wickets each in the semifinal against Australia and in the final against New Zealand. He finished as the tournament's joint second-highest wicket-taker with nine wickets in three matches at an average of 15.11, as India won the tournament. He was subsequently named in the Team of the Tournament by the International Cricket Council. He was part of the Indian squad for the 2025 Asia Cup held in September 2025. He finished as the second highest wicket taker for India behind Kuldeep Yadav, with seven wickets in six matches, as India won the title.

Varun was named in the India squad for the 2026 Men's T20 World Cup, co-hosted by India in February–March 2026. India won the tournament by beating New Zealand in the final, and Varun finished as the joint highest wicket taker with 14 wickets.

== Personal life ==
Varun made a cameo appearance in the 2014 Indian Tamil-language sports drama film Jeeva as a club cricketer. On 11 December 2020, he married his longtime girlfriend Neha Khedekar in Chennai.
