= Abhishek Sharma =

Indian cricketer (born 2000)

Personal information
- Born: 4 September 2000 (age 26); Amritsar, Punjab, India
- Height: 1.7 m (5 ft 7 in)
- Batting: Left-handed
- Bowling: Slow left-arm orthodox spin
- Role: Batting all-rounder

International information
- National side: India (2024–present)
- T20I debut (cap 111): 6 July 2024 v Zimbabwe
- Last T20I: 27 October 2026 v New Zealand
- T20I shirt no.: 4

Domestic team information
- Years: Team
- 2017–present: Punjab
- 2018: Delhi Daredevils
- 2019–present: Sunrisers Hyderabad

Career statistics
Competition	T20I	FC	List A	T20
Matches	70	24	69	209
Runs scored	2240	1,071	2,196	6,224
Batting average	33.43	30.60	33.78	33.10
100s/50s	4/14	1/5	4/8	10/38
Top score	135	100	170	148
Balls bowled	217	1,674	1,896	1,261
Wickets	12	20	41	58
Bowling average	25.58	49.10	37.68	27.70
5 wickets in innings	0	0	0	0
10 wickets in match	0	0	0	0
Best bowling	3/17	4/136	4/56	3/7
Catches/stumpings	25/–	21/–	35/–	86/–
Medal record
Men's cricket
Representing India
ICC T20 World Cup
Winner	2026 India & Sri Lanka
ACC Asia Cup
Winner	2025 UAE
Asian Games
Gold medal – first place	2026 Aichi-Nagoya
ICC U19 World Cup
Winner	2018 New Zealand
ACC U19 Asia Cup
Winner	2016 Sri Lanka
- Source: Cricinfo, 27 October 2026

Abhishek Sharma (born 4 September 2000) is an Indian cricketer who plays for the Indian national team. He is a batting all-rounder, who bats left-handed and bowls slow left-arm orthodox spin. He represents Punjab in domestic cricket and Sunrisers Hyderabad in the Indian Premier League. Sharma was a member of the Indian squad that won the 2026 T20 World Cup and the 2025 Asia Cup.

== Early life ==
Sharma was born on 4 September 2000 in Amritsar to Raj Kumar and Manju Sharma. He has two elder sisters. He completed his schooling from Delhi Public School, Amritsar. Sharma is a childhood friend of Shubman Gill and they used to open the innings for Punjab in the U14s. Yuvraj Singh played a role in coaching Sharma during the COVID-19 lockdown period.

== Domestic career ==
Sharma scored a century in his maiden U16 match in the domestic cricket tournament for the 2015–2016 Vijay Merchant Trophy. He scored 1,200 runs at an average of 109.09. He then made his U19 debut for Punjab in the Vinoo Mankad Trophy in 2016. Sharma captained the team to victory at the 2016 U19 Asia Cup and was the player of the match during the final. He also led the team during an ODI series against England U19 in 2017. He was a key member of the team that won the 2018 U19 World Cup. He scored a half-century against Bangladesh in the quarterfinal match of the tournament.

He made his debut in first-class cricket for Punjab in the 2017–18 Ranji Trophy on 6 October 2017. He led Punjab to their maiden Syed Mushtaq Ali Trophy win in the 2023–24 season finishing as the second-highest run scorer of the tournament with 485 runs from ten innings at an average of 48.50 and a strike rate of 192.46, registering two hundreds and three fifties.

He played in the 2018–19 Vijay Hazare Trophy for Punjab. On 28 February 2021, playing for Punjab against Madhya Pradesh, he scored the fastest hundred by an Indian in List A cricket, in 42 balls.

== Franchise career ==
In January 2018, Sharma was bought by Delhi Daredevils in the 2018 IPL auction for Rs 5.5 million. In May, he made his debut and went on to score 46 runs off 19 balls.

In February 2022, Sharma became opener in Sunrisers Hyderabad for the 2022 edition. During the tournament, he played 14 matches and scored 426 runs. In 2024, he scored the fastest fifty for SRH against Mumbai Indians at the Rajiv Gandhi International Cricket Stadium. He also finished the season with 484 runs in 16 matches and a strike rate of 200. He was the second highest run-scorer for the team after Travis Head. He won the Most Sixes award for hitting the highest number of sixes (42) in the tournament.

During the 2025 season, Sharma hit his first century of the league in 40 balls during the match against Punjab Kings. He scored 141 runs off 55 balls, the second highest individual score by an Indian and the fourth highest score by any batter in the league's history. Additionally, it was the highest score by an SRH batter and the fifth-fastest hundred witnessed by the league.

== International career ==
Sharma was called up for the 2024 tour of Zimbabwe and made his international debut in the first match on 6 July. He scored his maiden T20I century in the second match of the series, scoring 100 runs at the Harare Sports Club. He became the fastest Indian to score a century in terms of number of innings. He also became the fourth batter to hit a maiden T20I century before 24 years of age.

In 2025, he hit the highest individual score for India in T20Is by scoring 135 runs from 54 balls against England. His innings included 13 sixes and 7 fours. Sharma hit the second-highest score against England as well as the second-fastest half-century and century for India by balls faced. He also hit the most sixes for India in an innings in men's T20Is and had the highest run-rate during a 100+ run partnership for India in T20Is. He jumped to the 2nd spot in the men's T20I world rankings after the century, becoming India's number one batter.

In 2025, Sharma reached the number one world ranking in the T20I format and became the youngest Indian to do so. At the 2025 Asia Cup, Sharma broke the record of the most runs scored in a T20I edition of the tournament. He became the highest run-scorer of the edition with 314 runs in seven innings. He was also awarded the player of the tournament for his performance. His successful campaign led to him achieving the highest-ever rating points in T20I history with a total of 931 ranking points.

On 21 January 2026 in the first T20I between India and New Zealand at Nagpur, Sharma scored a match-high 84 runs. His innings laid a solid foundation for India with aggressive stroke play and quick running. India won by 48 runs, taking a 1–0 lead in the 5-match series.

During the 3rd T20I between India and New Zealand in Guwahati, Sharma hit the second fastest T20I 50 in the history of Indian cricket (14 balls), as he and Suryakumar Yadav chased down the target of 154 in 10 overs, giving India an unassailable 3–0 series lead. Sharma finished with an unbeaten 68* off just 20 balls. He is the only men's player from a full member nation to have made three 50+ scores in the powerplay in T20I's.

During the 2026 T20 World Cup, Sharma endured a dismal run in the group stage, missing a match due to illness and getting out for a duck in each of the remaining 3 games he played. With that, he holds the record of most ducks by a batter to start off a T20 World Cup campaign (3). He also has the most ducks for an Indian opener in the T20 World Cup overall. In the final, he scored 52 runs off 21 balls during a 98-run partnership with Sanju Samson, with it becoming the fastest half-century in the tournament from 18 balls.

On 17 September 2026, during the 3rd T20I against Afghanistan, Sharma hit a century off 30 balls, his third in T20I's, and broke the record for the fastest T20I century by any player from a full member nation. He scored 108 runs of 34 balls, hitting 9 fours and 11 sixes and celebrated the century with a yoga pose.

In October 2026, Sharma played a key role in India's victory over Pakistan in the men's cricket final at the 2026 Asian Games. Opening the innings, he scored 61 runs off 28 balls, including seven sixes and three fours, helping India reach 81 runs for two wickets during the powerplay. India went on to score 211 for six and won the match by 19 runs, securing the gold medal.

In the 3rd T20I against New Zealand, Sharma hit 113 runs of just 38 balls, making it his 4th T20I century overall. Batting alongside Vaibhav Sooryavanshi, they both batted through the powerplay to record the highest score every recorded in the first 6 overs(118/0), helping India chase down the target of 199 with ease. He was dismissed for 113 runs off 38 balls, caught by Glenn Phillips off the bowling of Kyle Jamieson in the third T20I against New Zealand on 27 October 2026.

== International centuries ==
Centuries against nations
Opponent	Test	ODI	T20I	Total
Afghanistan	–	–	1	1
Australia	–	–	–	–
Bangladesh	–	–	–	–
England	–	–	1	1
New Zealand	–	–	1	1
Pakistan	–	–	–	–
South Africa	–	–	–	–
Sri Lanka	–	–	–	–
West Indies	–	–	–	–
Zimbabwe	–	–	1	1
Total	–	–	4	4

=== T20I centuries ===
No.	Score	Against	Venue	Date
1	100	Zimbabwe	Harare Sports Club, Harare	7 July 2024
2	135	England	Wankhede Stadium, Mumbai	2 February 2025
3	108	Afghanistan	Arun Jaitley Stadium, New Delhi	17 September 2026
4	113	New Zealand	Wellington Regional Stadium, Wellington	27 October 2026
