= Shivam Dube =

Indian cricketer (born 1993)

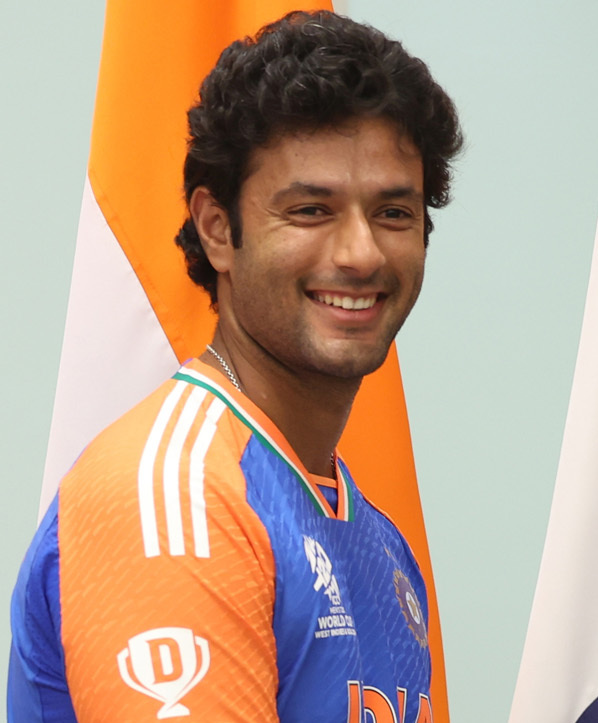
- Dube in 2024

Personal information
- Full name: Shivam Rajesh Dube
- Born: 26 June 1993 (age 33); Bombay, Maharashtra, India
- Height: 1.93 m (6 ft 4 in)
- Batting: Left-handed
- Bowling: Right-arm medium
- Role: All-rounder

International information
- National side: India (2019–present)
- ODI debut (cap 228): 15 December 2019 v West Indies
- Last ODI: 14 July 2026 v England
- ODI shirt no.: 25 (previously 70)
- T20I debut (cap 82): 3 November 2019 v Bangladesh
- Last T20I: 17 September 2026 v Afghanistan
- T20I shirt no.: 25 (previously 70)

Domestic team information
- Years: Team
- 2016–present: Mumbai
- 2019–2020: Royal Challengers Bangalore
- 2021: Rajasthan Royals
- 2022–present: Chennai Super Kings

Career statistics
Competition	ODI	T20I	FC	LA
Matches	6	66	25	62
Runs scored	43	1,036	1,541	1,121
Batting average	8.60	30.47	44.02	35.03
100s/50s	0/0	0/6	4/9	1/3
Top score	25	66	121*	118
Balls bowled	179	560	2,732	2,050
Wickets	3	34	58	48
Bowling average	55.00	26.38	21.72	38.00
5 wickets in innings	0	0	3	0
10 wickets in match	0	0	0	0
Best bowling	1/19	3/4	7/53	4/68
Catches/stumpings	1/–	24/–	8/–	18/–
Medal record
Men's cricket
Representing India
ICC T20 World Cup
Winner	2024 West Indies & USA
Winner	2026 India & Sri Lanka
ACC Asia Cup
Winner	2025 UAE
Asian Games
Gold medal – first place	2026 Aichi–Nagoya
Gold medal – first place	2022 Hangzhou
- Source: Cricinfo, 1 July 2026

Shivam Rajesh Dube (born 25 June 1993) is an Indian international cricketer. He plays for the India national team as an all-rounder, who bats left-handed and bowls right-arm medium. He represents Mumbai in domestic cricket and Chennai Super Kings in the Indian Premier League. Dube was a member of the Indian team that won the 2024 and 2026 Men's T20 World Cup

== Early life ==
Shivam Dube was born on 26 June 1993 in Bombay in Maharashtra. His father Rajesh Dube hails from Bhadohi district in Uttar Pradesh and had migrated to Mumbai for work.

Dube played school cricket for Hansraj Morarji Public School but had to stop playing at the age of 14 as he was overweight and unable to work on his fitness due to financial constraints. He returned to play at the age of 19 and was soon selected for the Mumbai Under-23s.

== Domestic career ==
He made his Twenty20 debut for Mumbai in the 2015–16 Syed Mushtaq Ali Trophy on 18 January 2016. He made his List A debut for Mumbai in the 2016–17 Vijay Hazare Trophy on 25 February 2017.

He made his first-class debut for Mumbai in the 2017–18 Ranji Trophy on 7 December 2017. In the first innings, he took his maiden five-wicket haul in first-class cricket. On 2 November 2018, in Mumbai's match against Railways in the 2018–19 Ranji Trophy, he scored his maiden century in first-class cricket. In his next match, against Karnataka, he took another five-wicket haul, with seven wickets for 54 runs. On 17 December 2018, in the Ranji Trophy match against Baroda, Dube hit five sixes in one over. It was the second time he had scored five sixes in an over, after doing it against Pravin Tambe in the Mumbai T20 League in March, where he was also named the player of the tournament. He was the leading wicket-taker for Mumbai in the Ranji Trophy in 2018, with 23 dismissals in eight matches.

In December 2018, he was bought by the Royal Challengers Bangalore in the player auction for the 2019 Indian Premier League. In February 2021, Dube was bought by the Rajasthan Royals in the IPL auction ahead of the 2021 Indian Premier League. In February 2022, he was bought by the Chennai Super Kings in the auction for the 2022 Indian Premier League tournament.

He was retained by CSK for 4 crores in the 2023 Indian Premier League. He scored 418 runs in 264 balls during the season, with an average strike rate of 158.33, and an average score of 38. His best performance of the season came against his former team RCB, when he scored 52 runs in 27 balls. He went on to win the season with CSK by scoring 32 runs in 21 balls in the final, without losing his wicket.

In the 2024 season of the Indian Premier League, he was retained by CSK for 4 crore. He scored 51 runs in 23 balls against Gujarat Titans in the second match of the season. He was awarded the Player of the Match for this performance.

== International career ==
In October 2019, Dube was named in India's Twenty20 International (T20I) squad for their series against Bangladesh. He made his T20I debut for India, against Bangladesh, on 3 November 2019. He registered bowling figures of 3/30 in the third match of the series.

Later the same month, Dube was named in India's T20I and One Day International (ODI) squads for their series against the West Indies. He scored his maiden international half-century in the second T20I, off 27 balls, after coming in to bat at 3. He made his ODI debut for India, against the West Indies, on 15 December 2019.

On 2 February 2020, in the fifth T20I match against New Zealand, Dube bowled the second-most expensive over in a T20I match, conceding 34 runs.

On 11 January 2024, in the first T20I against Afghanistan, he scored 60 runs off 40 balls and took a wicket while giving away 9 runs. In the next match, he hit an unbeaten 63 from 32 balls to help India chase down the target of 173 with more than 4 overs to spare.

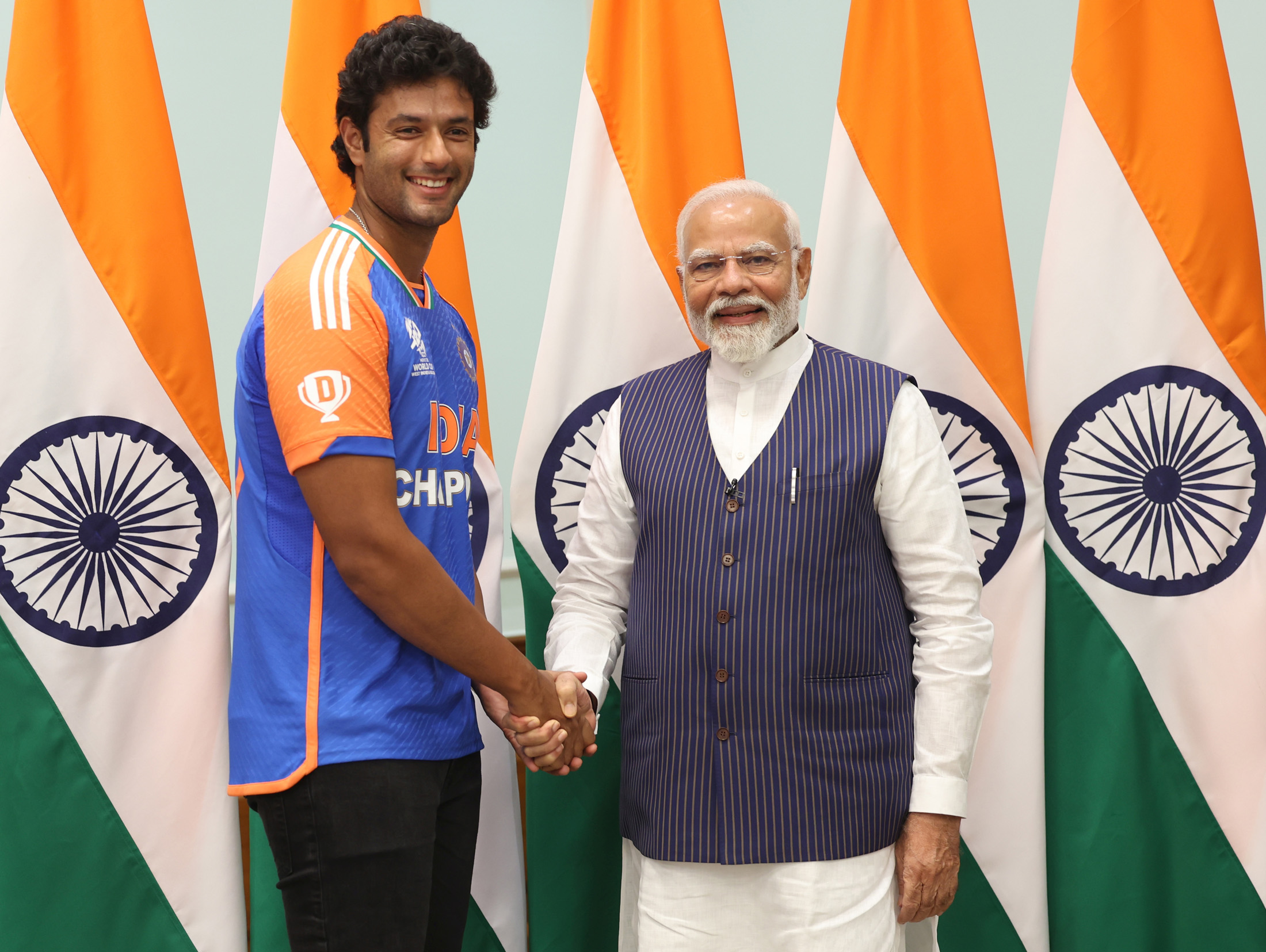
Dube meeting Narendra Modi after winning the T20 WC 2024

In May 2024, he was named in India's squad for the 2024 ICC Men's T20 World Cup tournament.

In July 2024, he won the man of the match award in the fifth T20I against Zimbabwe for scoring 26 off 12 balls and picking 2/25 in four overs. He made his second ODI appearance in August 2024 against Sri Lanka, and took his maiden ODI wicket while giving away 19 runs in 4 overs.

In January 2025, Dube made his international comeback in the fourth T20I against England in Pune, where he scored 53 off 34 balls and won man of the match despite being unable to bowl after suffering concussion. In the fifth T20I, he scored 30 runs off 13 balls and picked 2/11 in two overs.

In September 2025 while bowling against UAE in Asia Cup 2025, he got his best T20I bowling figures of 3/4 taking three crucial wickets in the middle overs to trigger a collapse.

In the first T20I against New Zealand on 21 January 2026 in Nagpur, Dube took two wickets in consecutive deliveries in a comprehensive win for India. In the second match of the series in Raipur, Dube contributed an all-round performance, taking the wicket of Daryl Mitchell before scoring an unbeaten 36 runs off 18 deliveries. His innings was highlighted by a 100-metre six off Ish Sodhi, as India chased down a target of 209 in 15.2 overs to take a 2–0 lead in the five-match T20I series. In the fourth match of the series, Dube scored the third fastest fifty by an Indian batter in International cricket in just 15 balls. India lost the match by 50 runs.

In December 2025, Dube was named in India's squad for the 2026 ICC Men's T20 World Cup tournament. He made crucial contributions during the course of the tournament such as scoring 66 runs off 31 deliveries before picking up 2 wickets against The Netherlands on 18 February 2026 in Ahmedabad, when he was adjudged the Player of the Match and a vital innings of 43 runs off 25 deliveries against England in the semi-finals. In the Final, he finished India's innings with an unbeaten 26 from just 8 deliveries, helping India post a mammoth score of 255 against New Zealand and win their record third ICC Men's T20 World Cup title, being Dube's second. He ended the tournament with 235 runs at a strike rate of 169.06, hitting 17 sixes in 8 innings.

== Personal life ==
On 16 July 2021, Dube married his long-time girlfriend Anjum Khan in Mumbai. The couple had their first child, a boy named Ayaan, on 13 February 2022. Their second child, a girl named Mehwish, was born on 3 January 2025.
