= 1760 English cricket season =

Cricket season review

The 1760 English cricket season took place in the middle year of the Seven Years' War. There are no historically important eleven-a-side or single wicket matches on record. (Note: Any match listed in the ACS' Important Match Guide (1981) is historically important, and therefore of the highest standard, whether or not a scorecard might exist. The same applies to numerous matches discovered by researchers since 1981. For further information, see First-class cricket.) A number of minor matches have been recorded with additional news items, some in a military context, which is a sign of the times.

== Events ==
Rowland Bowen recorded that "Winchester College beat Eton College in Port Meadow, Oxford" on 14 May.

In the Leeds Intelligencer dated 20 May 1760: "Leedes (sic). The Gentlemen Cricket Players are desired to meet at Mr Cowling's at Chapeltown on Monday next the 26th instant at ten o'clock in the morning; at which place, all who are willing to become subscribers, are desired to attend. Dinner will be on the table at two o'clock". This infers the formation of a Leeds club in 1760.

Ian Maun devotes nearly nine pages to 1760 in Volume II of From Commons to Lord's. His entries are mostly brief reports of minor matches, and diary entries which mention cricket. One report concerns a fatality on the Dicker at Lewes, where an elderly spectator was hit on the head by the ball, which "killed him on the spot". There were three matches in which the West Kent Militia played against Dover Cricket Club, besides other mentions with military connections.

One item is a letter written by a Royal Navy sailor to his parents. Serving aboard HMS Namur (1756) in Quiberon Bay (south coast of Brittany), he says the crew "go ashore very often and play at cricket". Maun adds that this is the first reference to cricket being played in France.

The Duke family, which had been making cricket balls for many years, formed the Duke & Sons company in Penshurst. The Dukes brand, in essence its six-seam ball, is now manufactured by British Cricket Balls Ltd. Duke balls are still in use at Test matches in England and elsewhere.

Artworks from 1760 include The Boy with a Bat, by Thomas Hudson, and A Cricket Match at Canterbury by Henry Hodgins.

== Bibliography ==
- ACS (1981). A Guide to Important Cricket Matches Played in the British Isles 1709–1863. Nottingham: ACS. OCLC 85045528.
- Bowen, Rowland (1970). Cricket: A History of its Growth and Development. London: Eyre & Spottiswoode. ISBN 978-04-13278-60-9.
- Buckley, G. B. (1935). Fresh Light on 18th Century Cricket. Birmingham: Cotterell & Co. OCLC 23450280.
- Maun, Ian (2011). From Commons to Lord's, Volume Two: 1751 to 1770. Leicester: Martin Wilson. ISBN 978-09-56906-60-1.
