= Block hole =

Block hole may refer to:

- Block hole (cricket), the space between a batter's toes and bat while awaiting a delivery
- An alternative title for the video game Quarth

== See also ==
- Black hole (disambiguation)
