= Anglicisation =

Form of cultural assimilation

Anglicisation, or anglicization, is a form of cultural assimilation whereby something non-English becomes assimilated into or influenced by the culture of England. It can be sociocultural, in which a non-English place adopts the English language or culture; institutional, in which institutions are influenced by those of England or the United Kingdom; or linguistic, in which a non-English term or name is altered due to the cultural influence of the English language. It can also refer to the influence of English soft power, which includes media, cuisine, popular culture, technology, business practices, laws and political systems.

Anglicisation first occurred in the British Isles, when Celts under the sovereignty of the king of England underwent a process of anglicisation. The Celtic language decline in England was mostly complete by 1000 AD, but continued in Cornwall and other regions until the 18th century. In Scotland, the decline of Scottish Gaelic began during the reign of Malcolm III of Scotland to the point where by the mid-14th century the Scots language was the dominant national language among the Scottish people. In Wales, however, the Welsh language has continued to be spoken by a large part of the country's population due to language revival measures aimed at countering historical anglicisation measures such as the Welsh Not.

== History and examples ==
=== Channel Islands ===
In the early parts of the 19th century, mostly due to increased immigration from the rest of the British Isles, the town of St Helier in the Channel Islands became a predominantly English-speaking place, though bilingualism was still common. This created a divided linguistic geography, as the people of the countryside continued to use forms of Norman French, and many did not even know English. English became seen in the Channel Islands as "the language of commercial success and moral and intellectual achievement". The growth of English and the decline of French brought about the adoption of more values and social structures from Victorian era England. Eventually, this led to the Channel Islands's culture becoming mostly anglicised, which supplanted the traditional Norman-based culture of the Islands.

From 1912, the educational system of the Channel Islands was delivered solely in English, following the norms of the English educational system. Anglicisation was supported by the British government, and it was suggested that anglicisation would not only encourage loyalty and congeniality between the Channel Islands and Britain, but also provide economic prosperity and improved "general happiness". During the 19th century, there was concern over the practise of sending young Channel Islanders to France for education, as they might have brought back French culture and viewpoints back to the Islands. The upper class in the Channel Islands supported anglicising the Islands, due to the social and economic benefits it would bring. Anglophiles such as John Le Couteur strove to introduce English culture to Jersey.

=== British Isles ===
Anglicisation was an essential element in the development of British society and of the development of a unified British polity. Within the British Isles, anglicisation can be defined as influence of English culture in Scotland, Wales, Ireland, the Isle of Man and the Channel Islands. Until the 19th century, most significant period for anglicisation in those regions was the High Middle Ages. Between 1000 and 1300, the British Isles became increasingly anglicised. Firstly, the ruling classes of England, who were of Norman origin after the Norman Conquest of 1066, became anglicised as their separate Norman identity, different from the identity of the native Anglo-Saxons, became replaced with a single English national identity.

Secondly, English communities in Wales and Ireland emphasised their English identities, which became established through the settlement of various parts of Wales and Ireland between the 11th and 17th centuries under the guidance of successive English kings. In Wales, this primarily occurred during the conquest of Wales by Edward I, which involved English and Flemish settlers being "planted" in various newly established settlements in Welsh territory. English settlers in Ireland mostly resided in the Pale, a small area concentrated around Dublin. However, much of the land the English settled was not intensively used or densely populated. The culture of settling English populations in Wales and Ireland remained heavy influenced by that of England. These communities were also socially and culturally segregated from the native Irish and Welsh, a distinction which was reinforced by government legislation such as the Statutes of Kilkenny.

==== Wales ====
During the Middle Ages, Wales was gradually conquered by the English. The institutional anglicisation of Wales was finalised with the Laws in Wales Acts 1535 and 1542, which fully incorporated Wales into the Kingdom of England. This not only institutionally anglicised Wales, but brought about the anglicisation of the Welsh culture and language. Motives for anglicising Wales included securing Protestant England against incursions from Catholic powers in Continental Europe and promoting the power of the Welsh Tudor dynasty in the rest of England.

Scholars have argued that industrialisation prevented Wales from being anglicised to the extent of Ireland and Scotland, as the majority of the Welsh people did not move abroad in search of employment during the early modern era, and thus did not have to learn to speak English. Furthermore, migration patterns created a cultural division of labour, with national migrants tending to work in coalfields or remain in rural villages, while non-national migrants were attracted to coastal towns and cities. This preserved monocultural Welsh communities, ensuring the continued prominence of the Welsh language and customs within them. However, other scholars argue that industrialisation and urbanisation led to economic decline in rural Wales, and given that the country's large towns and cities were anglicised, this led to an overall anglicisation of the nation.

The Elementary Education Act 1870 and the Welsh Intermediate Education Act 1889 introduced compulsory English-language education into the Welsh educational system. English "was perceived as the language of progress, equality, prosperity, mass entertainment and pleasure". This and other administrative reforms resulted in the institutional and cultural dominance of English and marginalisation of Welsh, especially in the more urban south and north-east of Wales. In 2022, the Commission for Welsh-speaking Communities warned that the emigration of Anglophones to Welsh-speaking villages and towns was putting the Welsh language at risk. In May 2026, Welsh councillor Einir Williams criticized Ordnance Survey 'for using names that have "no basis in tradition" across online, signs and publications'.

==== Modern non-British Isles diasporas ====
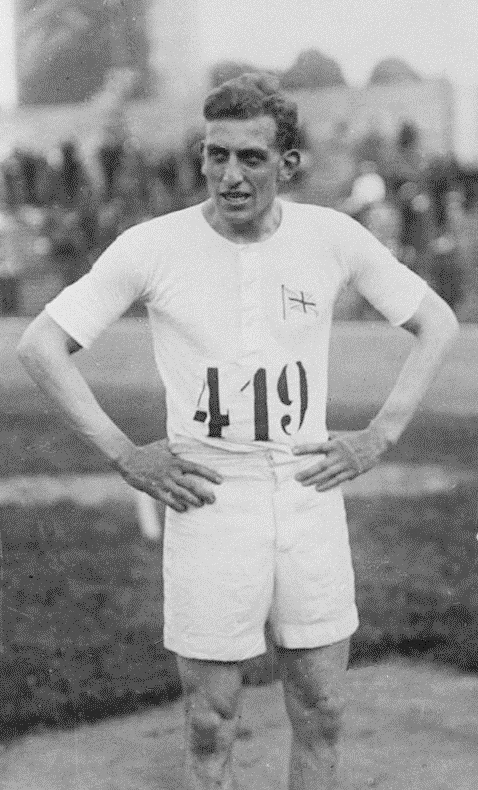
Harold Abrahams, an Anglicised athlete celebrated by British Jews for obtaining gold in the 1924 Olympics 100m sprint

Jewish refugees in Britain at the turn of the 20th century were encouraged to Anglicise themselves by playing British sports. Such assimilation was desired by both the immigrants and the local Anglo-Jewish elite, as it would preempt antisemitic and xenophobic prejudices.

=== Continental Europe ===
==== Germany ====
Philosophically, England's political ideals and strength were inspirational for Prussia in the 19th century. British art has also had a significant influence on Germany.

=== Anglo-America ===
==== Canada ====
The term Anglicisation started being used around the time that the question of Anglicising white populations outside of the British Isles first presented itself in the late 18th century, when the British Empire had to decide how to conciliate French Canadians to its rule. Anglicisation was also expected of immigrants, particularly at the time that the country envisioned itself as part of a global British imperial community, until the cultural mosaic model took root in the late 20th century.

==== United States ====
The United States was the first major British colony to become independent. Early into the American Revolution, the majority of the colonists still felt loyal to Britain and preferred reconciliation over independence. Close cultural relations eased the resumption of post-Revolution ties between the two nations and later aided their cooperation during World War II, giving rise to what became known as the Special Relationship. Both nations' cultural legacies and rising global stature led them to consider themselves as successors in certain ways to the Roman Empire, and American hegemony was able to peacefully succeed the British Empire's dominance in part due to the widely shared heritage.

During the 19th and 20th centuries, there was a nationwide effort in the United States to anglicise all immigrants to the US. This was carried out through methods including (but not limited to) mandating the teaching of American English and having all immigrants change their first and last names to English-sounding names. This movement was known as Americanisation and is considered a subset of Anglicisation due to English being the dominant language in the United States.

=== Latin America ===
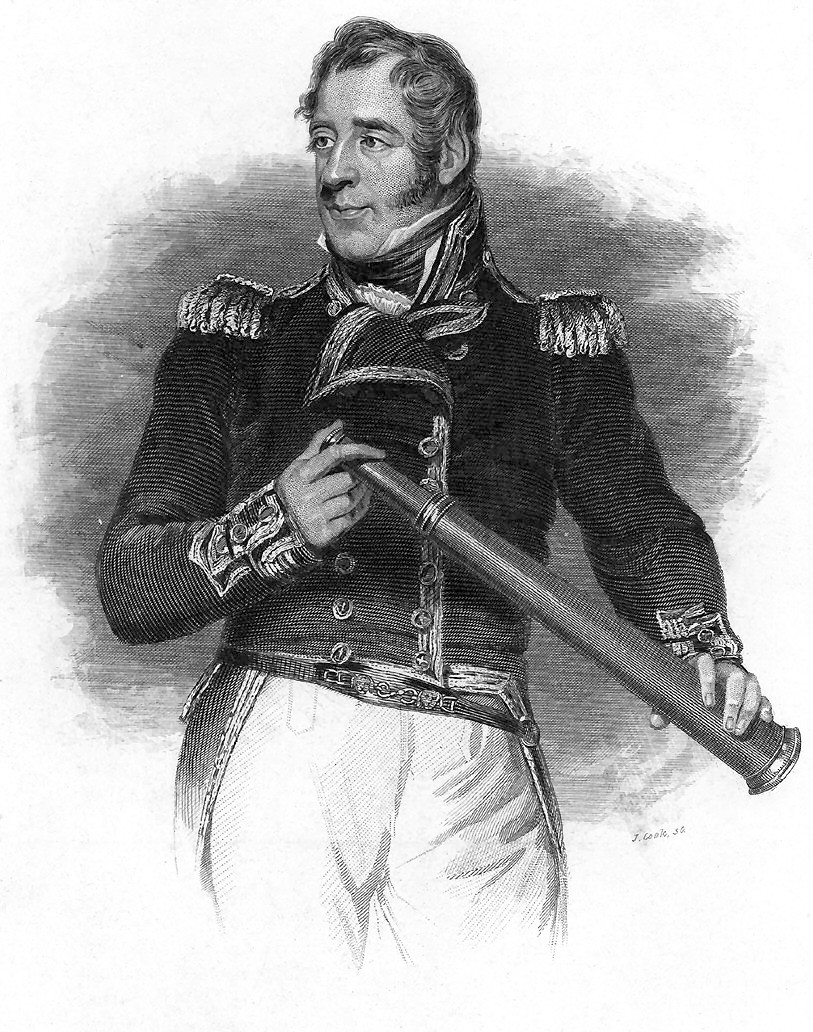
Admiral Thomas Cochrane, the 10th Earl of Dundonald.

==== Mexico ====
Cornish miners introduced some of their cuisine in the 19th century. Mexico's proximity to the United States has also furthered its uptake of the English language, particularly in the border regions.

=== East Africa ===
In Kenya, Christian missionaries played a significant role in advancing British culture. Though initially the colonial education system allowed for a more localised pedagogy, in the aftermath of the Mau Mau rebellion the curriculum was revised to feature a greater emphasis on British culture and positive involvement in the region.

=== Southern Africa ===
==== South Africa ====
Anglicisation came into greater effect after the Anglo-Boer War, when the British decided to inculcate Afrikaner children in the English language and culture, contesting prior Dutch societal influences.

=== West Africa ===
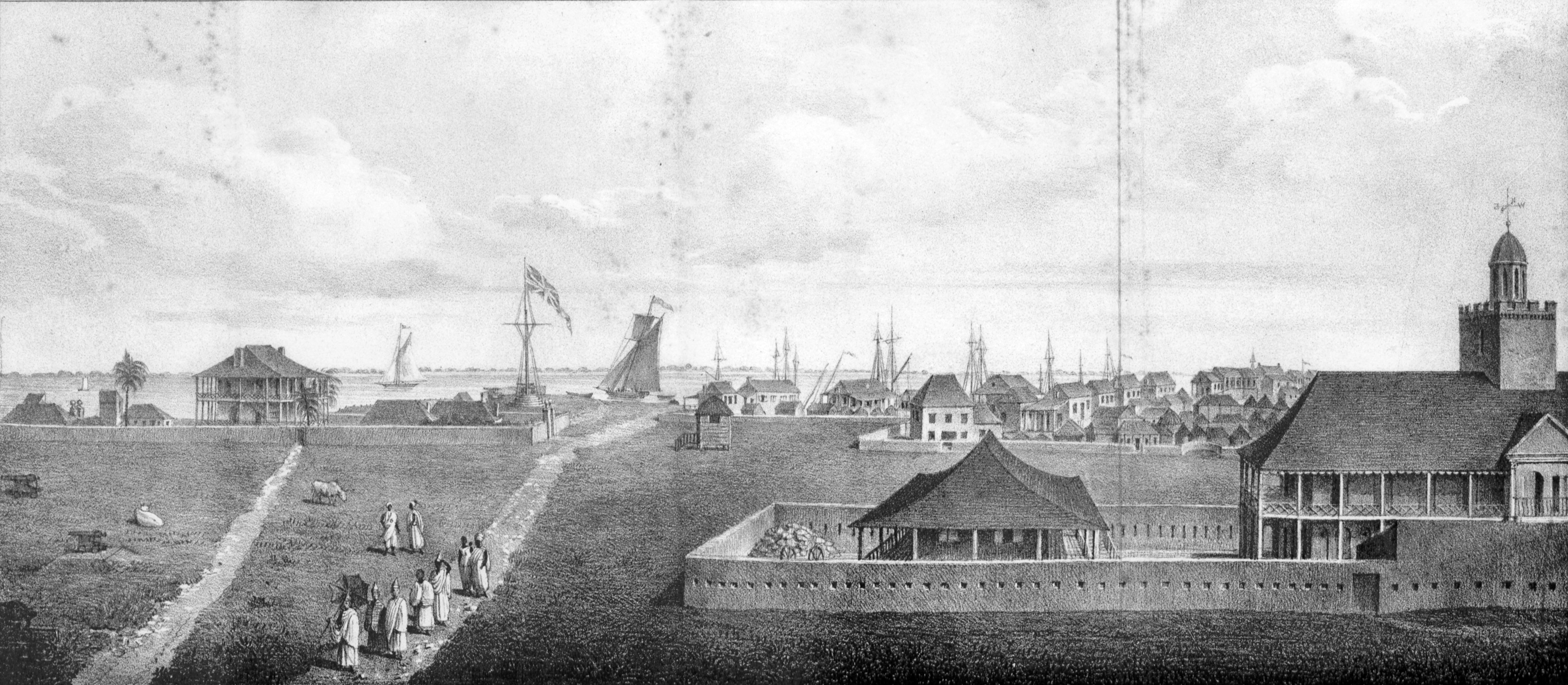
A sketch of the town of Bathurst, The Gambia, published in 1824

British West Africa was originally founded at the urging of the prominent abolitionist Fowell Buxton, who felt that ending the Atlantic slave trade required some level of British control of the coastline. Development was solely based on modernization, and autonomous educational systems were the first step to modernising indigenous culture. Cultures and interests of indigenous peoples were ignored. A new social order, as well as European influences within schools and libraries and local traditions, helped mould British West Africa's culture. The British West African colonial school curriculum helped play a role in this. Local elites developed, with new values and philosophies, who changed the overall cultural development.

=== East Asia ===
==== China ====
After 156 years of rule as a separate British colony, Hong Kong's political separation from the rest of the Lingnan area has resulted in a unique local identity. Elements of traditional Cantonese culture combined with British influences have shaped every aspect of the territory, including its law, politics, education, languages, cuisine, and way of thinking. It is for this reason that locals refer to themselves as Hongkongers (Jyutping: Hoeng^{1} gong^{2} yan^{4}; Traditional Chinese: 香港人), to distinguish themselves and their culture from that of the Han Chinese from Mainland China. The sense of Hong Kong people asserting their unique identity and nationality has increased over time. This is due to the rising phenomena of conflicts between Hong Kongers and Mainlanders.

=== South Asia ===
==== India ====
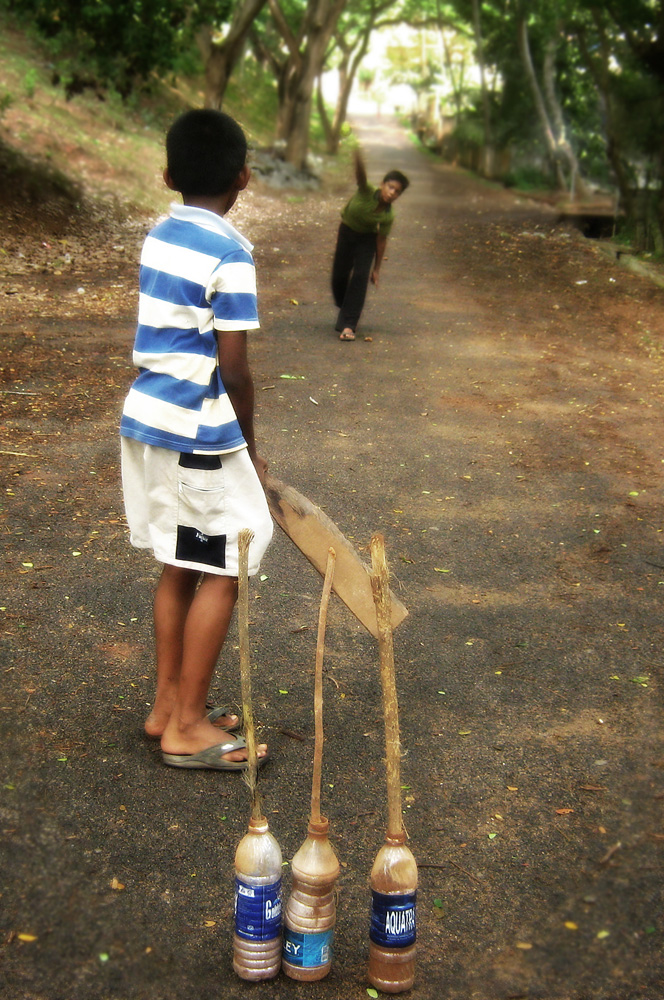
Cricket is the most popular sport in South Asia. The local spirit of innovating under duress has led to gully (street) cricket.

Two centuries of imperial British influence saw India become the subject of intense discussions around the merit of Westernisation and modernisation on an ancient, unchanging culture. In the decades after India's 1947 independence, Anglicisation actually became more apparent in some respects: more people had learned English, which now was more significant in its capacity as a world language, and cricket was greatly popularised. Universal adult suffrage and higher levels of college attendance were also achieved.

=== Southeast Asia ===
==== Singapore ====
Malay was Singapore's lingua franca late into the colonial era until English started to predominate; after Singapore became independent from British rule, it decided to keep English as its main language to maximise economic efficiency. Various politicians associated with Singapore's founding postcolonial period have measuredly praised British influences that they claim laid the foundation for the city to become more successful.

=== West Asia ===
During the late colonial era, British planners were preoccupied with combating growing anti-Western sentiments among Arabs; the instrumentalisation of the British Council was seen as the best way to create stronger cultural ties.

=== Oceania ===
==== Australia ====
Australians had very significant ties to the United Kingdom until the mid-20th century, with racial and historical ties cited as reasons to keep the relationship strong. The breakup of the British Empire then reoriented Australia towards American influences.

== Language ==
=== Linguistic anglicisation ===
Linguistic anglicisation is the practice of modifying foreign words, names, and phrases to make them easier to spell, pronounce or understand in English. The term commonly refers to the respelling of foreign words, often to a more drastic degree than that implied in, for example, romanisation.

Non-English words may be anglicised by changing their form and/or pronunciation to something more familiar to English speakers. Some foreign place names are commonly anglicised in English. Examples include the Danish city København (Copenhagen), the Russian city of Moskva (Moscow), the Swedish city of Göteborg (Gothenburg), the Dutch city of Den Haag (The Hague), the Spanish city of Sevilla (Seville), the Egyptian city of Al-Qāhira (Cairo), the German city of Braunschweig (Brunswick), and the Italian city of Firenze (Florence). The Indian city of Kolkata was once anglicised as Calcutta, until the city chose to change its official name back to Kolkata in 2001. Anglicisation of words and names from indigenous languages occurred across the English-speaking world in former parts of the British Empire. Toponyms in particular have been affected by this process.

In the past, the names of people from other language areas were anglicised to a higher extent than today. This was the general rule for names of Latin or (classical) Greek origin. Today, the anglicised name forms are often retained for the more well-known persons, like Aristotle for Aristoteles, and Hadrian (or later Hadrian) for Hadrianus. During the time in which there were large influxes of immigrants from Europe to the United States and United Kingdom during the 19th and 20th centuries, the names of many immigrants were never changed by immigration officials but only by personal choice.

=== Dominance of Anglo-/British English ===
Britishisms (terms unique to British English) have entered American English over the centuries and continuing to this day, despite the modern global predominance of American English. Globalisation and the increasing role of British journalists are cited as factors for this in the present day.

=== Englishisation ===
An amalgamation of the flags that represent the United States and the United Kingdom, the two countries at the forefront of spreading English across the world

Englishisation refers to the introduction of English-language influences into other languages. English, as a world language, has had a very significant impact on other languages, with many languages borrowing words or grammar from English or forming calques based on English words. Englishisation is often paired with the introduction of Western culture into other cultures, and has resulted in a significant degree of code-mixing of English with other languages as well as the appearance of new varieties of English. Other languages have also synthesised new literary genres through their contact with English, and various forms of "language play" have emerged through this interaction. Englishisation has also occurred in subtle ways because of the massive amount of English content that is translated into other languages.

Englishisation first happened on a worldwide scale because of the spread of the British Empire and American cultural influence, as the English language historically played a major role in the administration of Britain's colonies and is highly relevant in the modern wave of globalisation. One of the reasons for Englishisation is because other languages sometimes lacked vocabulary to talk about certain things, such as modern technologies or scientific concepts. Another reason is that English is often considered a prestige language which symbolises or improves the educatedness or status of a speaker.

== Sports ==
The influence of British sports and their codified rules began to spread across the world in the late 19th and early 20th centuries. A number of major teams elsewhere in the world still show these British origins in their names, such as A.C. Milan in Italy, Grêmio Foot-Ball Porto Alegrense in Brazil, and Athletic Bilbao in Spain. Cricket became popular in several of the nations of the then British Empire, such as Australia, South Africa, and South Asian nations such as India, Sri Lanka and Pakistan (see also: Sport in British India). Today, 90% of the sport's fans are in the subcontinent, with the game remaining popular in and beyond today's Commonwealth of Nations. The revival of the Olympic Games by Baron Pierre de Coubertin was also heavily influenced by the amateur ethos of the English public schools. The British played a major role in defining amateurism, professionalism, the tournament system and the concept of fair play. Some sports developed in England, spread to other countries and then lost its popularity in England while remaining actively played in other countries, a notable example being bandy which remains popular in Finland, Kazakhstan, Norway, Russia, and Sweden.

European morals and views on empires were embedded in the structure of sports. Ideas of "social discipline" and "loyalty" were key factors in European empire etiquette, which eventually transferred into sports etiquette. Also ideas of "patient and methodical training", were enforced to make soldiers stronger, and athletes better. Diffusion helped with the process of connecting these two concepts and has helped shaped the values of sports as we know it today. Sports like baseball, football (soccer), and cricket all came from European influence, and all share the same values based on European empires. In the case of the British Empire, the victory of the colonies in sports helped in transitioning out of empire.

=== Indirect influence ===
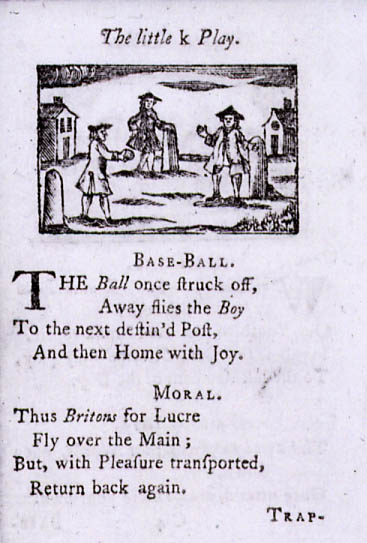
Baseball, the American pastime, originates from England, with its predecessors' first mention in print being in A Little Pretty Pocket-Book (1744).

English pastimes and ideas influenced early American sporting practices significantly. For example, Mark Dyreson has argued that American attempts to improve the world through sport took inspiration from British imperial models. The England-originated philosophy of Muscular Christianity also played a role in shaping American attitudes towards sport and its global role by the turn of the 20th century.

== See also ==
- British Invasion – US cultural phenomenon of the mid-1960s
- English diaspora
- Education:
  - English-medium education
  - Macaulayism
- Religion:
  - Christianization § British North America, Australia, New Zealand, Asia and Africa
