= Kookaburra Beast =

Line of cricket bats

'The Beast'

The Kookaburra Beast is a line of cricket bats manufactured by the Australian company Kookaburra Sport. This bat is popular with many international players, however after a decision in February 2006, the graphite backed model has been banned by the Marylebone Cricket Club in international test matches due to a speculation that the bat's graphite backing unlawfully strengthens the bat. In January 2021,'The Beast' made a stunning come-back to the cricketing world and it became quickly endorsed by some of world cricket's mega-stars including Glenn Maxwell, Martin Guptill and Shikhar Dhawan in both BBL, IPL and One Day Internationals.

== Characteristics ==
'The Beast' as it is commonly known, is one of Kookaburra's premier bats. It is made of the highest grade of English willow wood which is naturally air dried after harvesting. The handle is made of Sarawak cane and is covered in an octopus grip. The senior model weighs between 2 lbs 7oz and 2 lbs 11oz and comes in only 'short handle' and 'long blade' sizes. Junior models exist in an array of qualities from high-grade English willow to comparatively low-grade Kashmir willow.

== Professional players that use this bat ==
Australian Domestic players that use this bat include:

- Glenn Maxwell
- Brad Hodge
- Brad Haddin
- Simon Katich
- Mitchell Johnson
- Matthew Wade
- Chris Hartley
- Tim Paine
- Graham Manou
- Brett Lee
- Kumar Sangakkara

== Models ==
There are several models that fall in the Beast line. They include:

=== Senior models ===
- The Beast
- Wild Beast
- Angry beast
- Fiery beast
- Binga Beast
- Pure Beast

=== Junior models ===
- Wild beast
- Little beast
