= 10PL =

10PL - Tennis Ball Cricket
- Upcoming season or competition: 10PL Season 5
- First season: 2016
- No. of teams: 12-16
- Countries: UAE, India
- Most recent champion: SJA Shipping (2023)

10PL is a tennis ball cricket tournament that was established in 2016. Promoted with the theme Gully se Stadium Tak, it features a 10-over format and was initially staged in the United Arab Emirates with later editions held in India. The tournament provides a competitive platform for players from street and local cricket backgrounds to participate in matches held at professional stadiums.

== History ==
The first three editions of the tournament took place at Sharjah International Stadium in the UAE. The fourth edition was held at Lalbhai Contractor Stadium in Surat, India.

The tournament's format and organization were designed to provide street players with exposure to a structured and professionally managed sporting environment.

== Tournament Editions ==
Year	Venue	Winner	Runner-up	Notes
2016	Sharjah International Stadium	Pacific Venture	Petromann	Pacific Venture won the inaugural tournament.
2018	Sharjah International Stadium	Bisya Lions	Alliance	Won with a last-ball six.
2020	Sharjah International Stadium	Friends Kuwait	Globellink West Star Shipping	Close contest in the final.
2023	Lalbhai Contractor Stadium, Surat	SJA Shipping	Level Up	SJA Shipping won the final.

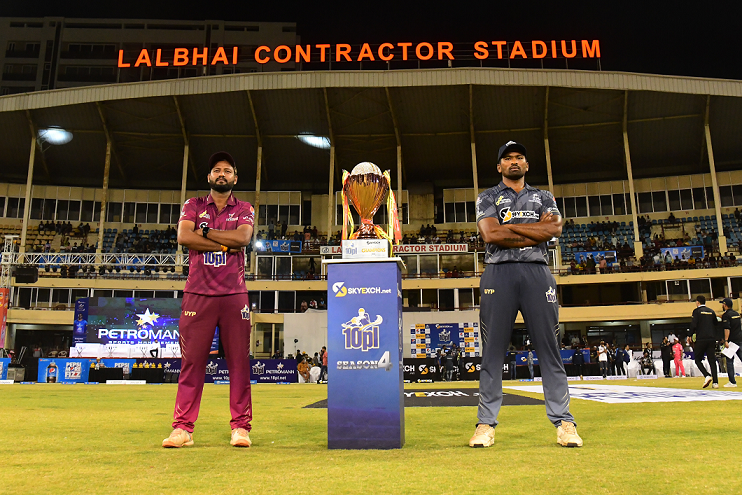
10PL Season 4 - Captains Photoshoot Before Finals.

== Format and Features ==
The 10PL tournament is played in a 10-over per side format using tennis balls, commonly used in street and amateur cricket in South Asia. The event incorporates features such as live commentary, third umpire technology, team dugouts, and standardized team kits to mirror the infrastructure of mainstream cricket competitions.

== Notable Matches ==
One of the tournament's most viewed matches was an India vs Pakistan exhibition fixture, which received significant online engagement. The match was made available via streaming platforms and attracted several million views.

== Brand Ambassadors and Mentors ==
Past editions of the tournament have included appearances from former international cricketers in ambassadorial or mentoring roles:

- Virender Sehwag (Season 1)
- Wasim Akram (Season 2)
- Dwayne Bravo (Seasons 3 and 4)
- Robin Uthappa served as a mentor for one of the participating teams during Season 2.

== Future Plans ==
As of 2025, preparations are underway for the fifth edition of the tournament, with the next season scheduled to return to India.

== See also ==
- Tennis ball cricket
