= Batting order (cricket) =

Sequence in which cricket batters play through their team's innings

In cricket, the batting order is the sequence in which batters play through their team's innings, there always being two batters taking part at any one time. All eleven players in a team are required to bat if the innings is completed (i.e., if the innings does not close early due to a declaration or other factor).

The batting order is colloquially subdivided into:

- Openers (batters one and two)
- Top order (batters one, two and three)
- Middle order (batters four to seven)
- Finishers and Lower Order/Tailenders (batters eight to eleven)

The order in which the eleven players will bat is usually established before the start of a cricket match, but may be altered during play. The decision is based on factors such as each player's specialities; the position each batter is most comfortable with; each player's skills and attributes as a batter; possible combinations with other batters; and the match situation whereby, for example, the team may require a more defensive or attacking player at that point in the innings. Also, a middle-order batter in Tests may open for ODIs and Twenty20 due to their aggressive approach to the game.

== Changing the batting order ==
The captain of the team can change the batting order during the game at their discretion. They can even change the batting line-up from one game to another in a tournament or series. There are no rules about the nature or number of changes made and, if more than one innings is played, the order used in each need not be the same. It has even been known for a captain to completely reverse his batting order for the second innings after following on. This has made it possible for a bowler to take a hat-trick across three consecutive overs of a match, including the same batter twice.

There are various reasons why the captain might make a change from the established order. Usually, however, captains and coaches prefer not to adjust the batting order unless necessary, as for example when South Africa moved Imran Tahir up the order against India because the South African top seven batters were poor against spin bowlers. In 2017, Faf du Plessis, who returned to the side as Test Captain after paternity leave, decided to make many changes to the batting lineup before the second test against England after being handed a heavy defeat. Du Plessis replaced JP Duminy at no. 5, and moved Quinton de Kock from 5 to 4 (de Kock already moved from no. 7 to 5 between the 1st and 2nd innings of the first Test), and due to the suspension of Kagiso Rabada due to demerit points, so Duanne Olivier replaced him, Philander moved up a spot to no. 7, while Theunis de Bruyn was replaced by Chris Morris at no. 8.

The Indian cricket team also shuffled their batting order in the first ODI of the India tour of West Indies and United States, 2023.

In the days before covered pitches, a particularly bad sticky wicket might see each team reverse the batting order to trade the wickets of their inferior batters for the time it could take for the unpredictability of the pitch to die down. Don Bradman has the highest test score as a #7 batsman after such a reversal of the order.

=== Pinch hitter ===
If the state of the game requires runs to be scored quickly, a captain will often promote a batter who is known to score quickly up the order. This is usually a lower-order batter, as their wicket is not regarded as being so valuable. A batter who is promoted up the order with the intention of scoring quick runs is called a pinch hitter or slogger. Some examples of pinch hitters include David Miller, Mitchell Starc, Shahid Afridi and Thisara Perera. In the West Indies' 2020 tour of England, during the second Test, England captain Joe Root sent Jos Buttler and Ben Stokes, two middle order batters known for quick scoring, up to open; the reason being England needed to score quickly in order to force a result despite rain. Stokes finished on 78* as England declared, while Buttler fell in the first over, having failed to score.

=== Nightwatchman ===
When a wicket falls near the end of the day, a lower order (less capable) batter might be sent in to bat with the intention that the more capable players will be held in reserve until the next morning. The more capable players are then not exposed to the risk of dismissal while tired or in low-light conditions. The batter who is sent in is known as the nightwatchman. This tactic is also used because players are typically nervous and unsettled at the start of the innings before settling into their rhythm and becoming "set". Sending a specialist batter in late in the day means that the batter will have to survive one such period in the afternoon, before doing the same again after the resumption of play the next day, increasing the chance of a dismissal, so a less valuable batter is sent in instead.

However, some nightwatchmen do go on to make big scores, most notably Jason Gillespie's 201* at number three (he usually batted at nine or ten) against Bangladesh in 2006.

== Opening batters ==
The opening batters or openers are the batters who bat first in the innings (no. 1 and 2). This position is very important as the openers need to get the innings off to a good start. The early fall of wickets can have a serious psychological impact on the rest of the team, affecting their performance with the bat. The opening batters also get the first experience of the pitch and conditions and must be able to adjust to them quickly. Due to this, they are able to inform other batters of the state of the pitch as well.

Most importantly, the opening batters must face a new ball, which is hard and has a pronounced seam. This makes it more liable to travel fast, bounce high, seam around (i.e., bounce unpredictably off the seam) and swing (i.e., deviate sideways when travelling through the air). These early conditions favour the bowling team, so the opening batters must have considerable patience, a sound technique and be good defensively. As the ball gets older, its condition starts to favour the batting team. Therefore, the openers will ideally stay at the crease long enough to protect the batters further down the order.

In first-class cricket, the rate at which the openers score runs is not as important as "taking the shine off" the new ball. This is the process of softening and roughening the cricket ball, whose condition tends to degrade the longer it is in play. By occupying the crease for a long time and taking the shine off the ball, the openers themselves are able to score more freely later on. This also makes batting easier for the rest of the order. Because of the defensive technique required early on, openers are sometimes less fluent stroke-players than the specialist batters who follow.

In limited overs cricket, the role of opening batter is slightly different. In this type of cricket a high run rate is a necessity. Also, in the early 1990s, fielding restrictions were introduced in the early overs of the game, limiting the fielding side to only two players on the boundary. To start the innings effectively and take advantage of the fielding restrictions, it became beneficial to have an aggressive batter opening the innings. Due to these differences, there are examples of batsmen who would ordinarily play down in the lower order, such as a wicket-keeper batsman in First Class and Test Match cricket or heavy hitting all-rounders, being elevated to open in limited overs cricket. Adam Gilchrist batted in a 6, 7 or 8 position batter for all but a handful of his Test innings but in One Day Internationals he opened over 260 times.

If an opening batter remains not out at the end of the team's innings, after all 10 other batters have been dismissed, he or she is said to have carried the bat.

== Top order ==
The top order is defined as the batters batting at positions 1, 2 and 3. The batters who bat at positions 1, 2 and 3 in the order are sometimes the most technically proficient batters with the best stroke play. They generally face new ball, and are expected to give a good start of the innings. Top and middle order batters must also be adaptable as they may be required to attack, consolidate or defend according to the needs of the team as the match situation develops.

== Middle order ==
The middle order is typically defined as the batters batting at positions 4, 5, 6, 7, and sometimes 8. It usually consists of versatile batters who must continue to build an innings. The middle order batter is likely to be facing a much older ball bowled by a spin bowler and defensive technique is necessary to overcome this type of attack, but they are often also fleet-footed players who attack slow bowling by charging down the pitch. The middle order players must also be adept at making runs when playing with the poor quality batters in the lower order. This requires the ability to manipulate the strike so that the tail-enders are shielded from the more potent bowlers.

Players who are designated as an all-rounder often bat in the middle order (e.g. Garfield Sobers usually batted at number 6; by contrast, W. G. Grace always opened the innings). wicket-keepers generally bat in the middle order as well, often at number 6 or 7 (e.g. Adam Gilchrist throughout his Test career usually batted at number 7; however he predominantly opened the batting in limited-overs cricket). One reason for placing all-rounders and wicket-keepers in the middle-order even though they may be more skilled than those who batted above them was because such players would be tired after bowling or keeping wicket during the preceding innings. Another reason, with the trend of wicket-keepers opening the innings in limited-over cricket, batters at positions 6, 7 and 8 tend to be at the crease when the second new ball is due, so they can function just like an opener and know how to wear out the new ball, or play aggressively to score quick runs to chase victory or to build the innings quickly towards a declaration. It is also plausible to see substitute wicket-keepers batting at number 5 or 6.

In One Day International cricket, middle order batters are generally able to change their game depending on the conditions. If their team loses wickets early, they must be able to play a long careful innings. Conversely, if they are not required to bat until later in the game, they must be able to attempt to score quickly, often attempting to hit many fours or sixes, and if they only have a short period to bat, they are expected to be innovative and able to settle after a short period. In run-chases they are required to be good at calculating and minimising the risks needed to reach the target, by scoring at close to the rate required. If they score more quickly than is required, they run the risk of getting out and exposing the weaker, lower-order batters to the pressure situation, but if they score too slowly, then they fall behind schedule and the pressure again increases.

Middle order players who become known for proficiency in batting for long periods and with the lower order are often said to be "anchor" players or "finishers" who can rescue the side from poor batting performance and can win a match with careful play to reach a target in the second innings or post a defendable total in the first innings. Australian player Michael Bevan was known during his player career by the nickname of "The Finisher", leading the ICC batting rankings multiple times, and helping Australia to numerous wins from his bat. Examples of this finishing style include the 1996 World Cup Semi-Final against the West Indies where Bevan and Stuart Law were at the crease with Australia having lost 4 wickets for just 15 runs in the 9th over. Law stayed in until the 41st over scoring 72 and Bevan the 44th over with 69 as Australia eventually scored 207 and the West Indies collapsed late in the match to fall 5 runs short. Bevan was the catalyst for one of the most famous victories in Australian cricket, scoring 78 and ending the game hitting a four off the final ball of the rain shortened one-day international against the West Indies on 1 January 1996 in Sydney, batting with Healy, Paul Reiffel and with Glenn McGrath helping Bevan by scoring a vital quick single off the penultimate ball of the match.

== Lower order or tail ==
The lower order is defined as the batters batting at positions 8 (sometimes), 9, 10 and 11. It is usually made up of players who have poorer batting skills compared to others in the team or new team members who are often placed there before they prove themselves a worthy batter; they are commonly known as tailenders (tail ender or tail-ender). These players are the team's specialist bowlers and sometimes the wicketkeeper, or even players on debut if their batting abilities are unproven. Bowlers with better batting abilities, aspiring all-rounders, or wicketkeepers do have a chance to move up the order over the course of their careers (notably Steve Smith moved from 7 to 3 or 4, and Ashton Agar moved from 11 to 7 in first-class cricket). However, some bowlers establish themselves as competent lower order batters, especially at no. 8 where many bowlers become bowling all-rounders, as in the case of fast bowlers Wasim Akram and Jason Holder, both of whom have a Test double century each to their names. By the same token, opening batters could move down the order due to poor form, having a top-heavy line-up or being better suited to play against spin bowling (notably Moeen Ali moving down from an opener to no. 7, or even 8, since the 2015 Ashes series, but has since also played at 3 in 2018). Therefore, the start of the lower order may vary in position depending on the balance of the side in terms of overall batting capability. Also, given that batters in ODIs and Twenty20 need to score quickly and aggressively, an opener in limited-overs forms of the game may bat down the order in Tests. A batting lineup containing more bowlers than usual may be described as having a "long tail".

It is likely that these batters will be dismissed for low scores. However, as expectations of these players are low when they are batting, they often play aggressive, carefree shots in the hope of scoring as many runs as possible. On occasion, the scores posted by the lower order have made a difference to the outcome of a match. If a significant contribution has come from the tail-enders, it is often said that "the tail wagged".

On occasions in which the batting team is a long way behind its opponents, the lower-order batters may attempt to salvage a draw by playing defensively until the end of the match. An example of this would be the first test in the 2009 Ashes series, in which England bowlers James Anderson and Monty Panesar were able to remain at the crease for 11.3 overs, denying Australia the chance to win the match.

The last batter in the order (at position 11) is sometimes referred to as Last Man Jack, a term that has passed into everyday parlance. This is because if the batting order were arranged as a pack of cards numbers 9 and 10 would be followed by Jack. Those batters who bat at positions 8 and 9 are also known as middle–lower order batters.

== Highest Test match scores for each batting position ==
=== Men ===
1. Sir Len Hutton (ENG): 364 vs. Australia at The Oval, 1938 (surpassed by Sir Garfield Sobers of the West Indies who scored 365 not out against Pakistan at Sabina Park in Jamaica in 1958)
2. Matthew Hayden (AUS): 380 vs. Zimbabwe at Perth, 2003–04
3. Brian Lara (WI): 400* vs. England at St. John's, 2003–04
4. Mahela Jayawardene (SL): 374 vs. South Africa at Colombo, 2006–07 (Note: This innings was part of the men's test cricket partnership record, a total of 624 runs with Kumar Sangakkara scoring 287 from 3rd position before his dismissal broke the partnership)
5. Michael Clarke (AUS): 329* vs. India at Sydney, 2012
6. Ben Stokes (ENG): 258 vs. South Africa at Newlands, 2016
7. Sir Donald Bradman (AUS): 270 vs. England at Melbourne, 1936–37 (Note: Bradman usually batted much higher in the batting order, but he reversed his team's batting order to protect the top order from an unpredictable pitch, resulting in him batting at number 7)
8. Wasim Akram (PAK): 257* vs. Zimbabwe at Sheikhupura, 1996–97
9. Ian Smith (NZ): 173 vs. India at Auckland, 1989–90
10. Walter Read (ENG): 117 vs. Australia at The Oval, 1884 (Note: Read normally batted in the middle order, between number 4 and 6)
11. Ashton Agar (AUS): 98 vs. England at Trent Bridge, 2013 (Note: This was Agar's debut Test match)

=== Women ===
1. Kiran Baluch (PAK): 242 vs. West Indies women's cricket team at Karachi, 2004
2. Thirush Kamini (IND): 192 vs. South Africa women's national cricket team at Mysore, 2014
3. Karen Rolton (AUS): 209* vs. England at Headingley, 2001
4. Mithali Raj (IND): 214 vs. England at Taunton, 2002
5. Emily Drumm (NZ): 161* vs. Australia at Christchurch, 1995
6. Annabel Sutherland (AUS): 210 vs. South Africa at WACA Ground, 2024
7. Kathryn Leng (ENG): 144 vs. Australia at Scarborough, 1996
8. Annabel Sutherland (AUS): 137* vs. England at Trent Bridge, 2023
9. Debbie Wilson (AUS): 92* vs. New Zealand, at Cornwall Park, Auckland, 1990
10. Shelley Nitschke (AUS): 81* vs. England, at Hove, 2005
11. Clea Smith (AUS): 42 vs. England, at Hove, 2005

Nitschke's score of 81 and Smith's 42 in the 2005 Women's Ashes in a partnership of 139 is the highest last wicket partnership in women's test cricket.

== See also ==
- Batting order (baseball)
