= Dilip Jajodia =

Indian-British businessman (born 1944)

- Born: 1944 (age 81–82)
- Occupation: Businessman
- Known for: Owner of British Cricket Balls Ltd

Dilip Jajodia (born 1944) is an Indian-British businessman, and current owner of British Cricket Balls Ltd, which manufactures the Dukes cricket ball.

== Personal life ==
Jajodia's family are from the Marwar region of Rajasthan in north-west India. He studied at the Bishop Cotton Boys' School in Bangalore, India, and has a degree in management. In 1962, Jajodia moved with his family to England. He played club cricket in India and England as an all-rounder. Jajodia says that he "lost his edge" after suffering a mouth injury fielding at silly point. Jajodia lives in north-east London, and runs the Woodford Wells Cricket Club. In 2019, Jajodia delivered a Gen KS Thimayya memorial lecture.

== Career ==
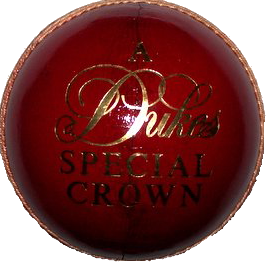
A Dukes cricket ball

In England, Jajodia worked as a Chartered Insurance Practitioner and a pension fund manager. Jajodia started working in cricket ball manufacturing in 1983. In 1987, Jajodia bought British Cricket Balls Ltd, the company that manufactures the Dukes cricket ball, from Gray-Nicolls. Jajodia moved the manufacturing of Dukes cricket balls from Tunbridge Wells to Walthamstow. Jajodia specifically chooses by hand the cricket balls to send to cricket venues for matches. Dukes balls are used in matches in England and the West Indies.

In 2017, Jajodia was in attendance at the Melbourne Cricket Ground for the first Sheffield Shield match to use the Dukes ball rather than the traditional Kookaburra ball. After India's 2018 series in England, Jajodia said he has no plans to market the Dukes ball in India. After the West Indies 2020 series in England, in which saliva could not be used to clean the cricket balls due to the COVID-19 pandemic, Jajodia said that he was happy with the swing of the Dukes balls.
