= Sanspareils Greenlands =

Cricket equipment manufacturer

- Industry: Apparel; Sports equipment
- Founded: 1931; 95 years ago
- Founder: Kedarnath Anand
- Headquarters: Meerut, Uttar Pradesh, India
- Area served: Worldwide
- Key people: Kailash C. Anand (Chairman); Paras Anand (CEO)
- Products: Cricket balls; athletic apparel; sporting goods
- Website: teamsg.in

Sanspareils Greenlands (SG) is an Indian cricket equipment manufacturer. The company was founded in 1931 and its located in Meerut, Uttar Pradesh, India in 1950. It specialises in manufacturing various equipment used for cricket and the company manufactures the red ball used in all Test cricket and first-class cricket matches in India.

== History ==
The company was founded by brothers Kedarnath and Dwarakanath Anand in Sialkot, present-day Pakistan in 1931. Originally from Lahore, the brothers apprenticed at their uncle’s sports shop before deciding to diversify their family’s leather business into sports equipment manufacturing and exports. By the start of World War II, the company employed around 250 workers and remained operational during the war. After the partition of India, the family moved to Agra and later settled in Meerut in 1950. In 1972, the company introduced its own line of protective cricket gear under the brand Featherlite.

In the 1980s, the company shifted its focus primarily to cricket equipment, including bats, balls, pads, and gloves, as the demand for skilled craftsmanship in cricket products increased. In 1982, the company began selling its products under its own brand and opened a second manufacturing unit. Around the same time, Wasiullah Khan, a former state-level cricketer, joined as a junior manager. By 1992, the company began supplying cricket balls for Ranji Trophy matches after approval from the Board of Control for Cricket in India (BCCI). This eventually extended to Test cricket.

Timeline

- 1931 (Sanspareils Co. / Greenlands): The Anand brothers founded Sanspareils Co. in Sialkot (and operated an associated business called Greenlands), focusing on exporting sports goods.
- 1972 (Featherlite): After relocating to Meerut, the company launched its own proprietary line of lightweight protective cricket gear (like batting pads and gloves) under the brand name Featherlite. Vijay Manjrekar was the first cricketer to endorse it.
- 1979 (Sanspareils Greenlands): The two sibling businesses, Sanspareils and Greenlands, officially merged into a single entity called Sanspareils Greenlands.
- 1982 (SG): The company began marketing all of its cricket equipment under the unified SG brand name.

== Products ==
The company manufactures cricket clothing and equipment including bats, balls and other equipment. The company manufactures the red balls used in all Test cricket in India since 1994. The ball is hand-stitched with a more prominent seam resulting from the thicker thread used for stitching. While its pronounced seam makes it last longer, the ball does not swing early but starts swinging later. The protruding seam gives more control for the fast bowlers and a firm grip for the spinners.

== See also ==
- Dukes
- Kookaburra Sport
