= Windball cricket =

Windball cricket is a bat-and-ball game, a version of cricket, played between two teams. It is an 8-overs-a-side contest and played mostly on concrete surface. The ball used in this type of cricket is made out of soft plastic material and gives a more consistent bounce on concrete surfaces with less wear and tear than regular or tape balls.

It is very popular in West Indian cricket-playing countries, especially in Trinidad where it is the usual form of backyard cricket.
