= Pinch hitter (cricket) =

Term for a batsman promoted to score quick runs

In cricket, pinch hitter or slogger is a term for a batter who is promoted up the batting order in order to score quick runs.

== Etymology ==
The term "pinch hitter" comes from baseball as the batter is expected to score some quick runs and relieve the pressure without having much concern of losing the wicket.

== Role ==
The term is used to denote a batter who is promoted up the batting order. It is often done in limited overs cricket to increase the rate of scoring and relieve the pressure while chasing a big target. Often pinch hitters aren't expected to stay for too long and hence, are usually lower order batters or all rounders whom the batting side can afford to lose in the effort to score quick runs. They might come in instead of the regular designated batter typically at a critical points in a match.

== History ==
The term was introduced to cricket during the 1992 World Cup when New Zealand employed the tactic to good effect with Mark Greatbatch and England promoted Ian Botham to a similar role. It was later employed by opening batsmen to target bowlers with hits over the infield when the fielding restrictions are in place during the initial overs in ODI cricket and popularized further by Sanath Jayasuriya and Romesh Kaluwitharana of Sri Lanka during the 1996 World Cup. Krishnamachari Srikkanth of India is considered one of the pioneers of pinch hitting when he played similar form of cricket more than ten years before Greatbatch when the term was not coined. After the success of Sri Lanka in the 1996 World cup, more players like Shahid Afridi of Pakistan, Herschelle Gibbs of South Africa and Adam Gilchrist of Australia started adapting the same. Sachin Tendulkar and Mark Waugh adapted a different way of playing the role by scoring rapidly by using classical styles to find the gaps in the field rather than go over the top. Later players like Virender Sehwag and Chris Gayle took to aggressive batting and the introduction of Twenty20 cricket saw such hitting becoming a regularity with more batters oriented towards it.
