= British Cricket Balls Ltd =

British sports equipment company

British Cricket Balls
- Company type: Private
- Industry: Apparel; Sports equipment
- Founded: 1760; 266 years ago
- Headquarters: London, United Kingdom
- Area served: Worldwide
- Key people: Dilip Jajodia (owner)
- Products: Cricket balls; athletic apparel; sporting goods
- Website: dukescricket.co.uk

British Cricket Balls Limited is a British sports equipment and apparel company, specialising in cricket equipment. The company manufactures the Dukes brand of cricket balls used for playing Test cricket in United Kingdom, the West Indies and Ireland. The company was founded in 1760 by the Dukes family. The company is currently owned by Indian businessman Dilip Jajodia, who acquired it in 1987.

== History ==
The Duke family began hand-manufacturing cricket balls as a cottage industry at Redleaf Hill, Penshurst, Kent, England in 1760 and continuing until 1841. Having gained the Royal patent for the cricket balls in 1775, Duke made the first-ever six-seam cricket ball, which was presented to the then Prince of Wales and used in the 1780 English cricket season. In 1851, Dukes triple-sewn ball won a prize medal at the Great Exhibition and a gold medal at the Melbourne International Exhibition in 1880.

In 1920, Dukes merged with John Wisden and company, a manufacturer of cricket bats. In 1999, the company introduced the white ball for that year's Cricket World Cup. The company was acquired by Indian businessman Dilip Jajodia in 1987.

== Products ==
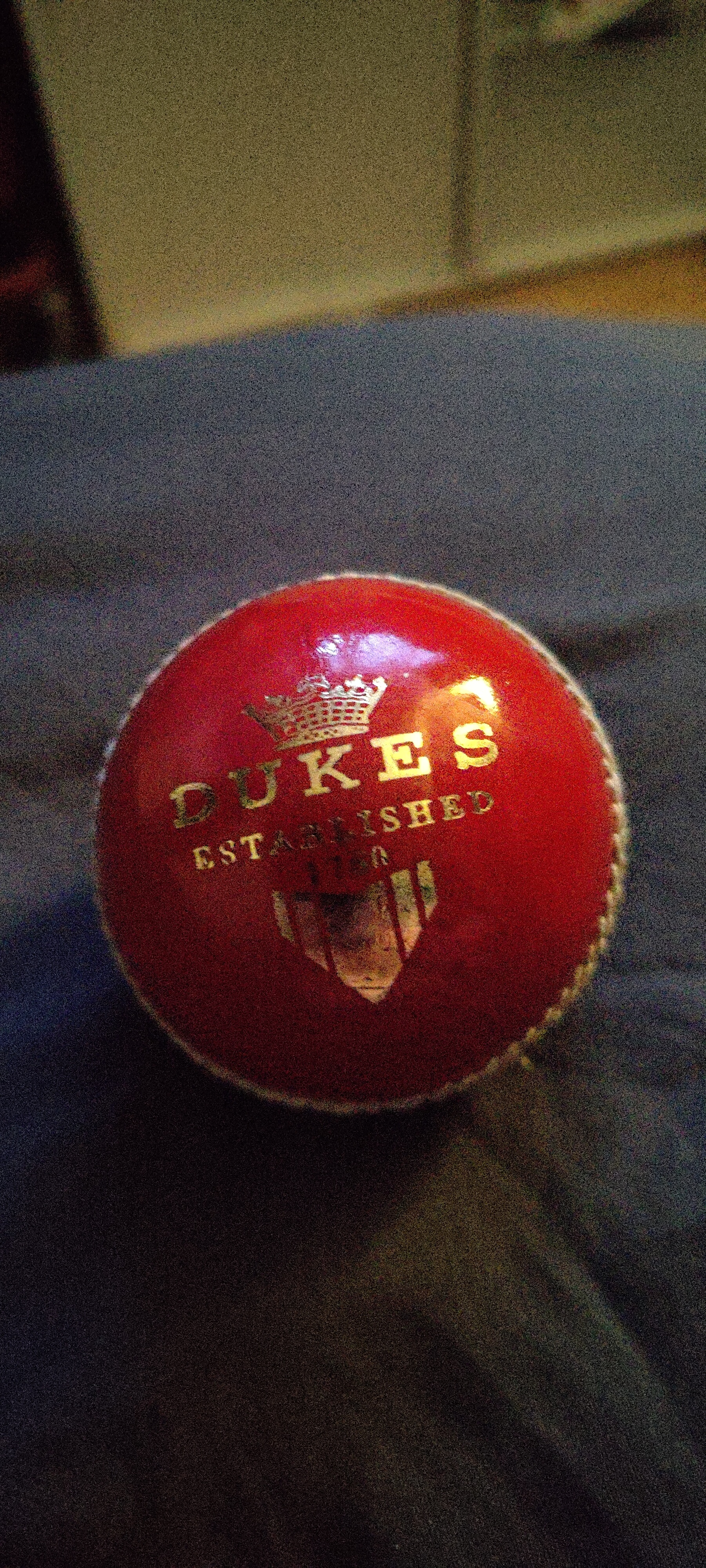
Cricket ball made by the company

The red cricket balls manufactured by the company are used for playing Test cricket in United Kingdom, the West Indies and Ireland. The ball consists of a hand-stitched seam with six rows of threads. The ball retains its shape and characteristics longer compared to the other balls in use and hence provides a good swing. The leather is polished with a synthetic grease with a traditional English Alumtine finish which gives a darker shade to the ball.

== See also ==
- Kookaburra Sport
- Sanspareils Greenlands (SG)
