= Cricket ball =

Ball used to play cricket

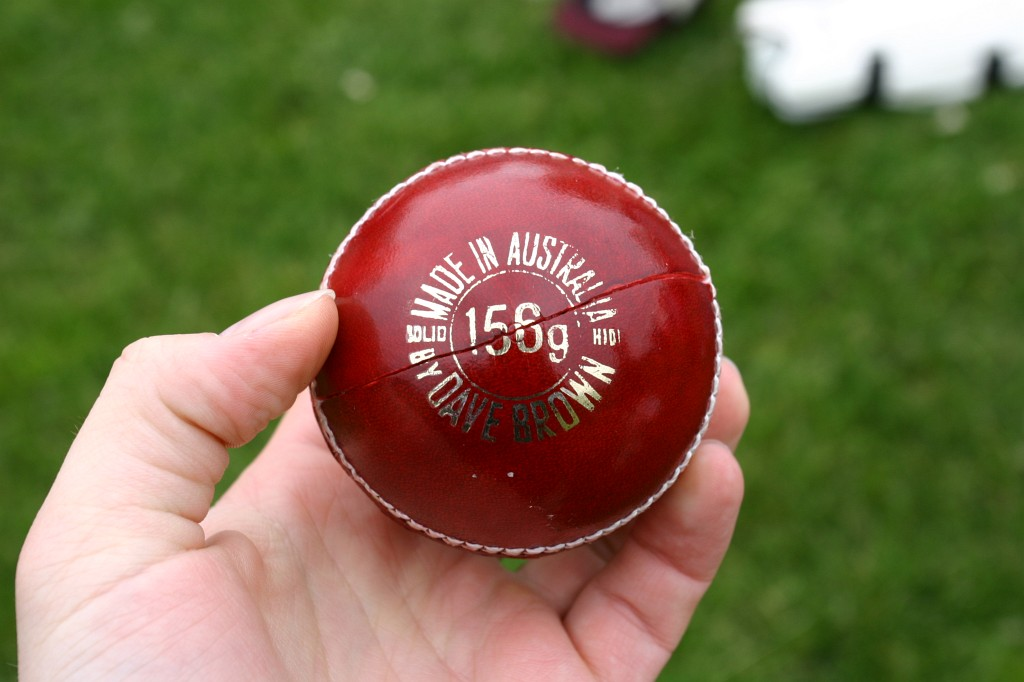
A cricket ball

A cricket ball is a hard, solid ball used to play cricket. A cricket ball consists of a cork core wound with string then a leather cover stitched on, and manufacture is regulated by cricket law at first-class level. The trajectory of a cricket ball when bowled, through movement in the air, and off the ground, is influenced by the action of the bowler and the condition of the ball and the pitch, while working on the cricket ball to obtain optimal condition is a key role of the fielding side. The principal method through which the batter scores runs is by hitting the ball, with the bat, into a position where it would be safe to take a run, or by directing the ball through or over the boundary. Cricket balls are harder and heavier than baseballs.

The traditional red cricket ball is normally used in Test cricket, professional domestic games played over several days, and almost all amateur cricket. In many one day cricket matches, a white ball is used instead in order to remain visible under floodlights, and since 2010, pink has been introduced to contrast with players' white clothing and for improved night visibility during day/night Test matches. Training balls of white, red and pink are also common, and tennis balls and other similar-sized balls can be used for training or informal cricket matches. During cricket matches, the quality of the ball changes to a point where it is no longer usable, and during this decline its properties alter and thus can influence the match. Altering the state of the cricket ball outside the permitted manners designated in the laws of cricket is prohibited during a match, and so-called "ball tampering" has resulted in numerous controversies.

Injuries and fatalities have been caused by cricket balls during matches. The hazards posed by cricket balls were a key motivator for the introduction of protective equipment.

== Manufacture ==
British Standard BS 5993 specifies the construction details, dimensions, quality and performance of cricket balls.

A cricket ball is made with a core of cork, which is layered with tightly wound string, and covered by a leather case with a slightly raised sewn seam. In a top-quality ball suitable for the highest levels of competition, the covering is constructed of four pieces of leather shaped similar to the peel of a quartered orange, but one hemisphere is rotated by 90 degrees with respect to the other. The "equator" of the ball is stitched with string to form the ball's prominent seam, with six rows of stitches. On international level balls manufactured by Dukes, and SG, the two halves are hand stitched together using three seams on each half. On the ball made by Kookaburra only the inner two seams are used to hold the two halves together. The outer four seams are produced by machine and their only purpose is to provide additional grip for the bowlers fingers. The remaining two joins between the leather pieces are stitched internally forming the quarter seam. Lower-quality balls with a two-piece covering are also popular for practice and lower-level competition due to their lower cost.

Cricket ball specifications
	Weight	Circumference
Men, and boys 13 and over	5.5 to 5.75 oz (156 to 163 g)	8.81 to 9 in (224 to 229 mm)
Women, and girls 13 and over	4.94 to 5.31 oz (140 to 151 g)	8.25 to 8.88 in (210 to 226 mm)
Children under 13	4.69 to 5.06 oz (133 to 143 g)	8.06 to 8.69 in (205 to 221 mm)
Younger children	A plastic ball such as a "Kwik cricket ball" is often used	

The nature of the cricket ball slightly varies with its manufacturer. White Kookaburra balls are used in one-day and Twenty20 international matches, while red Kookaburras are used in Test matches played in most of the twelve Test-playing nations, except for the West Indies, Ireland and England, who use Dukes, and India, who use SG balls.

== Use ==
=== Colour ===
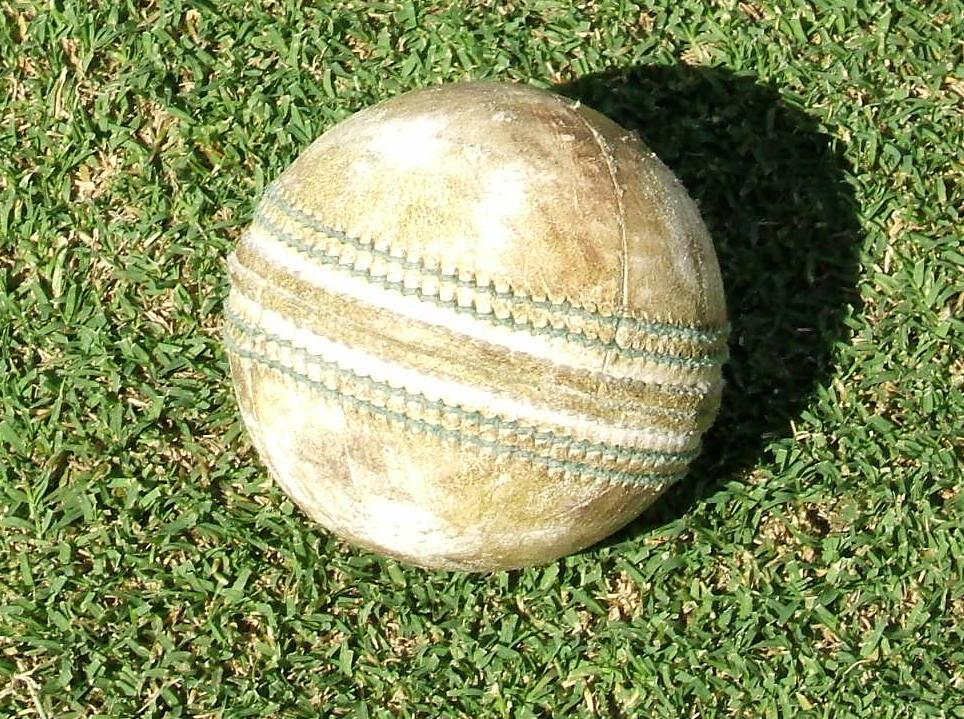
White balls are used in many limited overs cricket matches, especially those involving floodlights (day/night games). This is because a red ball under yellow lights takes on a brownish colour which is very similar to the colour of the pitch.

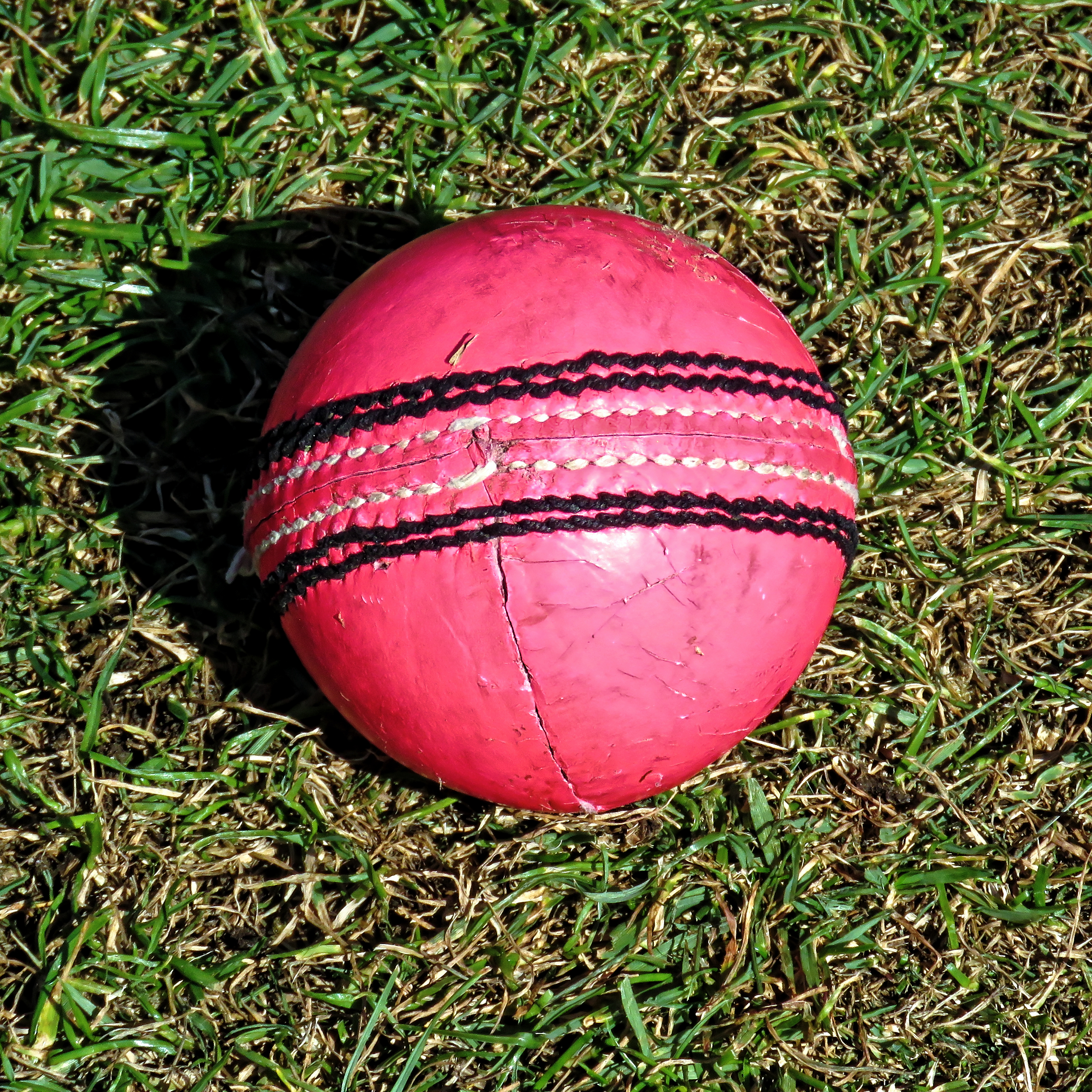
A pink cricket ball. Pink balls deteriorate more slowly than white balls, but have better night visibility than red balls, making them the most suitable ball for day-night Test cricket.

Cricket balls are traditionally red, and red balls are used in Test cricket and First-class cricket but proposals to introduce other colours date back at least as early as 1937.

White balls were introduced when one-day matches began being played at night under floodlights, as they are more visible at night; all professional one-day matches are now played with white balls, even when they are not played at night. Many players report that white balls swing more than red balls, and one amateur's bowling-machine tests found white balls deviated more and they deteriorate more quickly. Manufacturers attribute the difference to playing conditions rather than the ball. They also claim that white and red balls are manufactured using the same methods and materials, other than the dyeing of the leather. Another problem associated with white cricket balls used in One Day Internationals is that they quickly become dirty or dull in colour, which makes it more difficult for batters to sight the ball after 30–40 overs of use. Since October 2012, this has been managed by the use of two new white balls in each innings, with a different ball used from each bowling end; the same strategy was used in the 1992 and 1996 Cricket World Cups. Between October 2007 and October 2012, the issue had been managed using one new ball from the start of the innings, then swapping it at the end of the 34th over with a "reconditioned ball", which was neither new nor too dirty to see. Before October 2007, except during 1992 and 1996 World Cups, only one ball was used during an innings of an ODI and it was at the umpires' discretion to change the ball if it was difficult to see.

Pink balls were developed in the 2000s to enable Tests and first-class matches played at night. The red ball is unsuited to night tests due to poor visibility, and the white ball is unsuited to first-class cricket because it deteriorates rapidly and cannot be used for eighty overs as specified in the Laws, also the white ball colour would clash with the traditional white clothes worn. The pink ball was designed to provide a satisfactory compromise on these issues. It is still considered more difficult to see than a white ball; and the leather is more heavily dyed than a red ball, which better preserves its colour and visibility as it wears but also gives it slightly different wear characteristics. It has performed well enough in testing and first-class cricket to be approved for use in international cricket. A pink ball was used for the first time in an international match in July 2009 when the England Women's team defeated Australia in a one-day match at Wormsley, and a pink ball was used in a day-night Test match for the first time in November 2015. Other colours were also experimented with, such as yellow and orange (glowing composite), for improved night visibility, but pink proved to be the preferred option.

=== Current status ===
As of 2014, the ball used in Test match cricket in England had a UK recommended retail price of £100. In test match cricket this ball is used for a minimum of 80 overs (theoretically five hours and twenty minutes of play), after which the fielding side has the option of using a new ball. In professional one day cricket of 50 overs per innings, at least four new balls are used for each match (two in each innings, one for each bowling end). T-20 cricket uses two new balls, one per innings. Amateur cricketers often have to use old balls, or cheap substitutes, in which case the changes in the condition of the ball may be different from professional cricket.

There are three main manufacturers of cricket balls used in international matches: Kookaburra, Dukes and SG. The manufacturer of the red (or pink) balls used for Tests varies depending on location: India uses SG; England, Ireland and the West Indies use Dukes; and all other countries use Kookaburra. The different manufacturers' balls behave differently: for instance, the hand-stitched Dukes balls have a prouder seam and will tend to swing more than Kookaburra balls – providing a home advantage when playing against a team unfamiliar with the ball. All limited overs international matches, regardless of location, are played with white Kookaburra balls. White Dukes balls were used at the 1999 Cricket World Cup, but due to their more erratic behaviour than Kookaburras, they have not been used since. Domestic competitions may use a domestic manufacturer: for example, Grays balls are used in Pakistani first-class competitions.

Cricket balls can reach speeds of over 160km/h (100mph) when bowled by pace bowlers and made to deviate from a straight course, both in the air (known as 'swinging') and off the ground (known as 'seaming'). A spin bowler bowls at a lower speed, but imparts lateral revolutions on the ball at the point of delivery so that it deviates from a straight course more significantly than other methods when bouncing. As cricket bats have become thicker, the ball can now be hit well over 100 metres (300 ft) before touching the ground.

Commentator and former Test bowler Simon Doull noted that cricket balls produced after the 2015 Cricket World Cup produced a lot less swing regardless of manufacturer. This was said to be apparent in 2017 ICC Champions Trophy, even on traditionally swing-friendly British pitches, particularly with white balls, but the former West Indian bowler Ian Bishop was unwilling to support this.

== Condition of a cricket ball ==
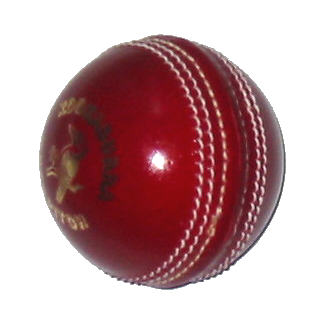
A new cricket ball

In Test cricket and T20 cricket, a new ball is used at the start of each innings in a match. In one-day cricket, two new balls, one from each end, are used at the start of each innings. A cricket ball may not be replaced except under specific conditions described in the Laws of Cricket:

- If the ball becomes damaged or lost.
- If the condition of the ball is illegally modified by a player.
- In Test cricket, after the ball currently in use becomes 80 overs old, the captain of the bowling side has the option to take a new ball.

The ball is not replaced if it is hit into the crowd – the crowd must return it. If the ball is damaged, lost, or illegally modified, it will be replaced by a used ball in a similar condition to the replaced ball. A new ball can only be used after the specified minimum number of overs have been bowled with the old one.

Because a single ball is used for an extended period of play, its surface wears down and becomes rough. The bowlers may polish it whenever they can, usually by rubbing it on their trousers, producing the characteristic red stain that can often be seen there. However, they will usually only polish one side of the ball, in order to create 'swing' as it travels through the air. They may only apply sweat to the ball as they polish it. The formerly widespread practice of applying saliva was banned by the ICC during the ongoing COVID-19 pandemic. In a June 2020 press release, the ICC announced that "A team can be issued up to two warnings per innings but repeated use of saliva on the ball will result in a 5-run penalty to the batting side. Whenever saliva is applied to the ball, the umpires will be instructed to clean the ball before play recommences". The MCC conducted research during the period that shining the ball using saliva was banned, and they concluded that "there was little or no impact on the amount of swing that bowlers were getting". Therefore, in March 2022, the practice of shining the ball using saliva was banned permanently.

The seam of a cricket ball can also be used to produce different trajectories through the air, with the technique known as swing bowling, or to produce sideways movement as it bounces off the pitch, with the technique known as seam bowling.

Since the condition of the cricket ball is crucial to the amount of movement through the air a bowler can produce, the laws governing what players may and may not do to the ball are specific and rigorously enforced. The umpires will inspect the ball frequently during a match. If the ball is out of shape due to normal wear and tear due to batting and ball hitting the pitch, a ball of similar usage and condition will be used as a replacement: e.g. a ball about 30 overs old will be replaced by a ball about the same age.

It is illegal for a player to:

- rub any substance apart from sweat onto the ball
- rub the ball on the ground
- scuff the ball with any rough object, including the fingernails
- pick at or lift the seam of the ball.
- apply saliva on the ball

Despite these rules, it can be tempting for players to gain an advantage by breaking them. There have been a handful of incidents of so-called ball tampering at the highest levels of cricket.

A new cricket ball is harder than a worn one and is preferred by fast bowlers because of the pace and bounce of the ball off the pitch as well as the seam movement. Older balls tend to spin more as the roughness grips the pitch more when the ball bounces, so spin bowlers prefer to use a worn ball, though a ball of about 8–10 overs old is still useful to a spinner as it can get more drift in the air. Uneven wear on older balls may also make reverse swing possible. A captain may delay the request for a new ball if they prefer to have spin bowlers operating but usually asks for the new ball soon after it becomes available.

== Dangers of cricket balls ==
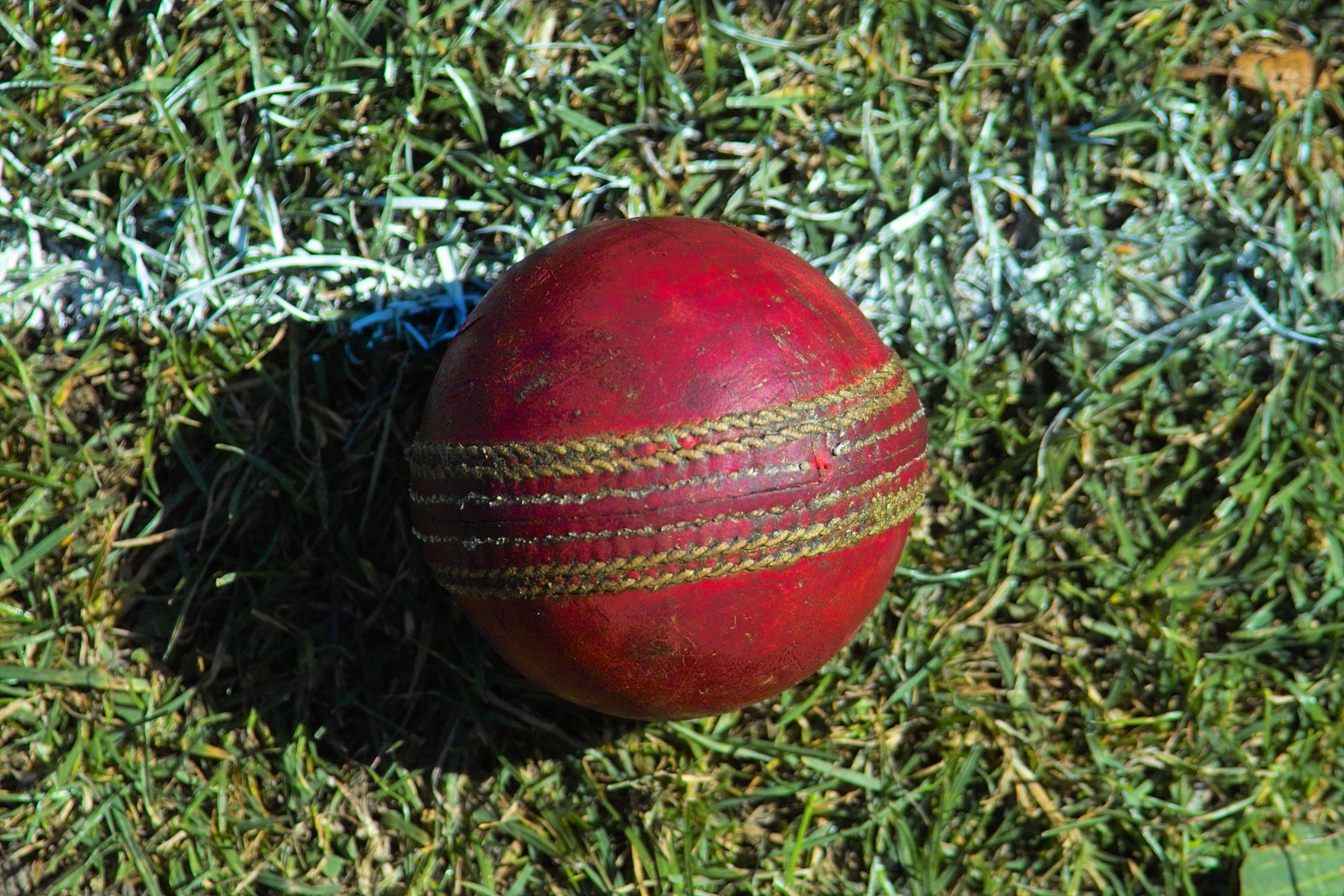
A used cricket ball

Cricket balls are hard and potentially lethal, so most of today's batters and close fielders often wear protective equipment. Cricket ball injuries are fairly frequent, including eye (with some players having lost eyes), head and face, finger and toe, teeth and testicular injuries.

Frederick, Prince of Wales (1707–1751) is often said to have died of complications after being hit by a cricket ball, although the connection between the incident and his actual cause of death is unproven. Glamorgan player Roger Davis was seriously injured by a ball in 1971 when he was hit on the head while fielding. The Indian batter Nariman 'Nari' Contractor had to retire from the game after being hit on the head by a ball in the West Indies in 1962.

In 1998, Indian cricketer Raman Lamba died when a cricket ball hit his head in a club match in Dhaka. Lamba was fielding at forward short leg without a helmet when a ball struck by batter Mehrab Hossain hit him on the head and rebounded to wicket-keeper Khaled Mashud.

A cricket umpire, Alcwyn Jenkins, died in 2009 in Swansea, Wales after being hit on the head by a ball thrown by a fielder.

In November 2014, Australia and South Australia batter Phillip Hughes died at the age of 25 at a Sydney hospital after he was hit on the side of the neck by a bouncer bowled by Sean Abbott during a Sheffield Shield game. The same week, Hillel Oscar, an umpire and former captain of Israel's national cricket team, died after being hit in the neck by a ball.

== Alternatives to cricket balls ==
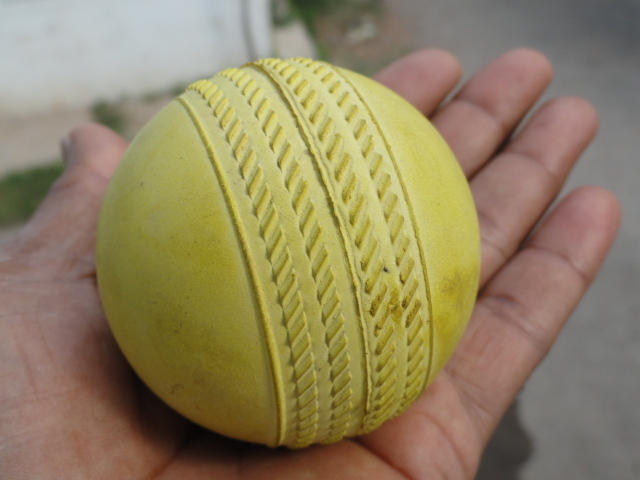
A yellow alternative cricket ball (Rubber-Ball)

Sometimes alternatives to a real cricket ball may be preferred for reasons of safety, availability and cost. Examples include a tennis ball and a plastic version of the cricket ball.

Many casual players use a tennis ball wrapped in layers of some type of adhesive tape (often electrical tape), which makes the relatively soft tennis ball harder and smoother. This is commonly referred to as a tape ball. A common variant is to tape only half the tennis ball, to provide two different sides and make it easy to bowl with prodigious amounts of swing.

Younger players often use either tennis balls or an air-filled plastic 'windball' for safety reasons before using the 'hard' cricket ball after a certain age: windball cricket is also a popular sport in its own right. They might also use an 'IncrediBall' or an 'Aeroball' whilst making the step between windballs and 'hard' cricket balls. These balls are designed to mimic the feel, speed and bounce of a regular hard ball, but soften when coming in contact with objects at high speed, reducing the risk of injury.

== See also ==
- Baseball (ball): Traditionally made quite similarly, with a cork centre (today usually rubber) wrapped tightly with string and encased in leather.
- Cricket clothing and equipment
