= Cricket in South Asia =

Cricket in the Indian subcontinent

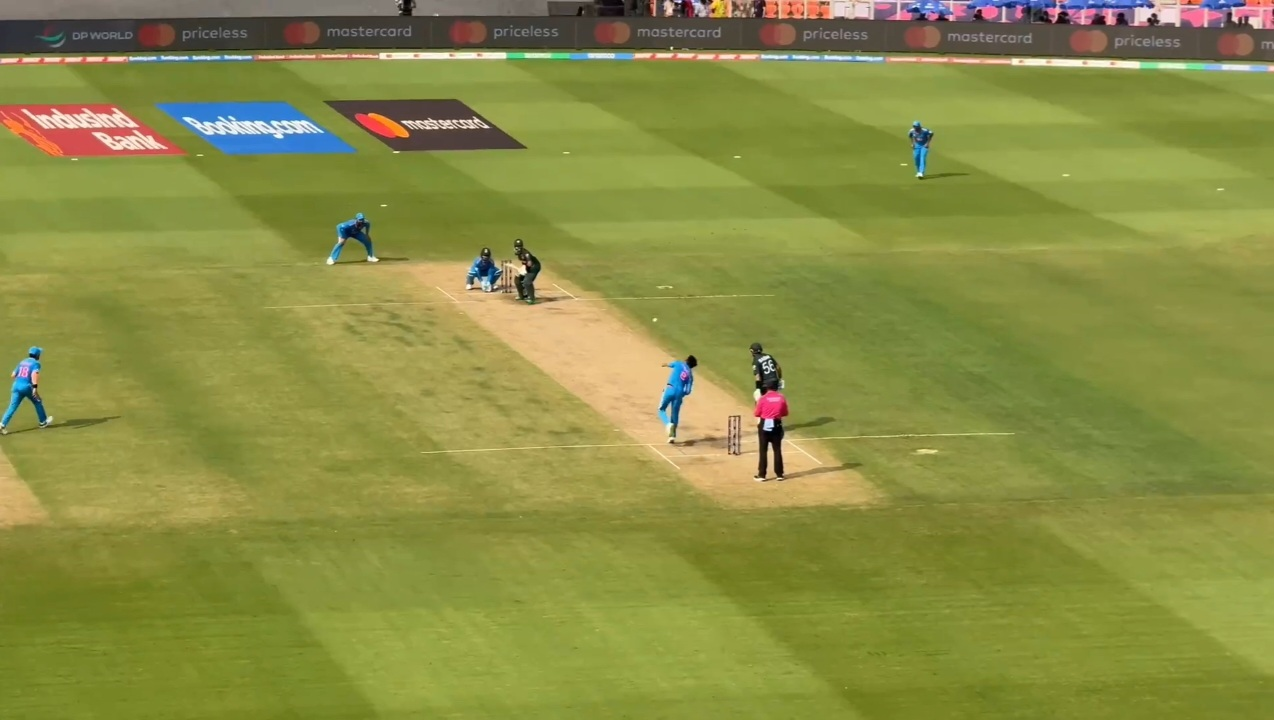
The 2023 Cricket World Cup match between India and Pakistan.

Cricket is the most popular sport in South Asia, with 90% of the sport's worldwide fans being in the region according to a 2018 market research by the International Cricket Council (ICC).

== History ==
=== Colonial era ===
One reason for cricket's initial adoption in South Asia was its similarity to local games, such as gilli-danda (pictured above) and seven stones.

Cricket was brought to India in the early 1700s, with the first documented instance of cricket being played in 1721. At the time of its introduction, it served as a medium for Indians to integrate into British cultural norms. By serving as a bridge between the two groups, it facilitated assimilation. During its early years in India, the sport was played by Indian elites to gain favour with the British. This association with the elite increased the sport's value and popularity across the country. Although it began as a foreign sport, the sport ultimately became associated with India and began to play a role in India's identity. In the late 1800s, cricket's image began to shift from being an exclusively upper-class sport as players from lower castes and underprivileged communities began to play and make their mark.

=== Contemporary era ===
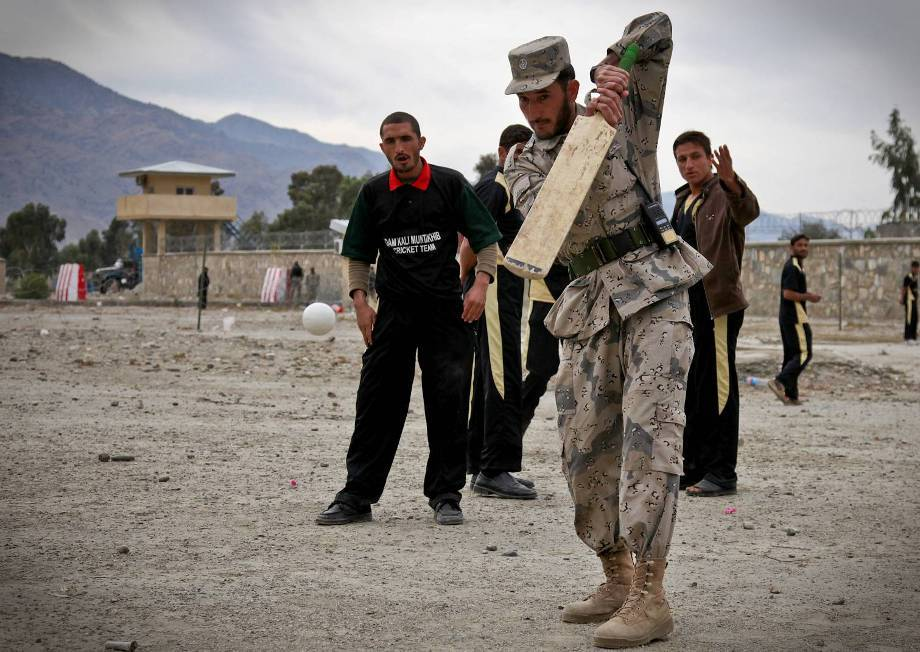
An Afghan soldier playing cricket. Afghan refugees who lived in Pakistan and India brought the sport back to Afghanistan, and it is now one of the most popular sports in the country.

Cricket has helped shape national identities across South Asia, contributing to the self-esteem of peoples throughout the region and creating cultural bonds between them. The game has played a role in reducing caste discrimination and other social barriers among South Asians. Cricket's role in South Asia has often been associated with local geopolitical events; for example, India-Pakistan matches have been affected and even cancelled at times due to tensions between the two countries, while the opposing sides in the Sri Lankan Civil War were willing to declare a ceasefire for the duration of the 2007 Cricket World Cup.

Cricket started to become the most popular sport in South Asia around the time of India's 1983 Cricket World Cup victory, overtaking the previous local favorite field hockey. Further growth happened with the televising of cricket in regional languages. Another major milestone in Indian cricket was the 2007 launch of the Indian Premier League (IPL), which has become one of the wealthiest sports leagues in the world and contributed to an explosion of Indian sports leagues in general. These developments have led to South Asia becoming very important in world cricket's decision-making, and being a financially important place for other countries to tour when playing international cricket.

India and Pakistan have a very heated cricket rivalry, with India-Pakistan cricket matches (particularly at global events) being some of the highest-viewed matches in global sport. Cricket has been suggested by a number of commentators as a possible way to create peace between the two countries.

== Cricket leagues ==
The Indian Premier League is the most popular cricket league in South Asia, followed by the Pakistan Super League and the Bangladesh Premier League.

=== IPL attendances ===
The 2025 Indian Premier League average attendance was 35,154. The IPL final took place in front of 90,871 spectators.

| # | Team | Average |
|---|---|---|
| 1 | Kolkata Knight Riders | 45,877 |
| 2 | Gujarat Titans | 43,957 |
| 3 | Chennai Super Kings | 37,944 |
| 4 | Lucknow Super Giants | 34,821 |
| 5 | Royal Challengers Bengaluru | 34,566 |
| 6 | SunRisers Hyderabad | 33,612 |
| 7 | Mumbai Indians | 32,988 |
| 8 | Delhi Capitals | 32,739 |
| 9 | Rajasthan Royals | 27,651 |
| 10 | Punjab Kings | 27,384 |

=== PSL attendances ===
The 2025 Pakistan Super League average attendance was 9,331. The PSL season was marked by relatively low crowd turnout at several matches.

| # | Team | Average |
|---|---|---|
| 1 | Lahore Qalandars | 12,478 |
| 2 | Peshawar Zalmi | 10,312 |
| 3 | Islamabad United | 9,847 |
| 4 | Multan Sultans | 9,156 |
| 5 | Quetta Gladiators | 8,523 |
| 6 | Karachi Kings | 5,672 |

=== BPL attendances ===
The 2025 Bangladesh Premier League average attendance was 4,964. The BPL season saw a record revenue from ticket sales.

| # | Team | Average |
|---|---|---|
| 1 | Dhaka Capitals | 6,243 |
| 2 | Fortune Barishal | 5,872 |
| 3 | Chittagong Kings | 5,513 |
| 4 | Rangpur Riders | 4,827 |
| 5 | Khulna Tigers | 4,412 |
| 6 | Sylhet Strikers | 4,098 |
| 7 | Durbar Rajshahi | 3,784 |

== See also ==
- Sport in South Asia
- South Asian diaspora#Sport
- Street cricket (also known as gully cricket in South Asia)
  - Tennis ball cricket
