= Tennis ball cricket =

Cricket played with a tennis ball

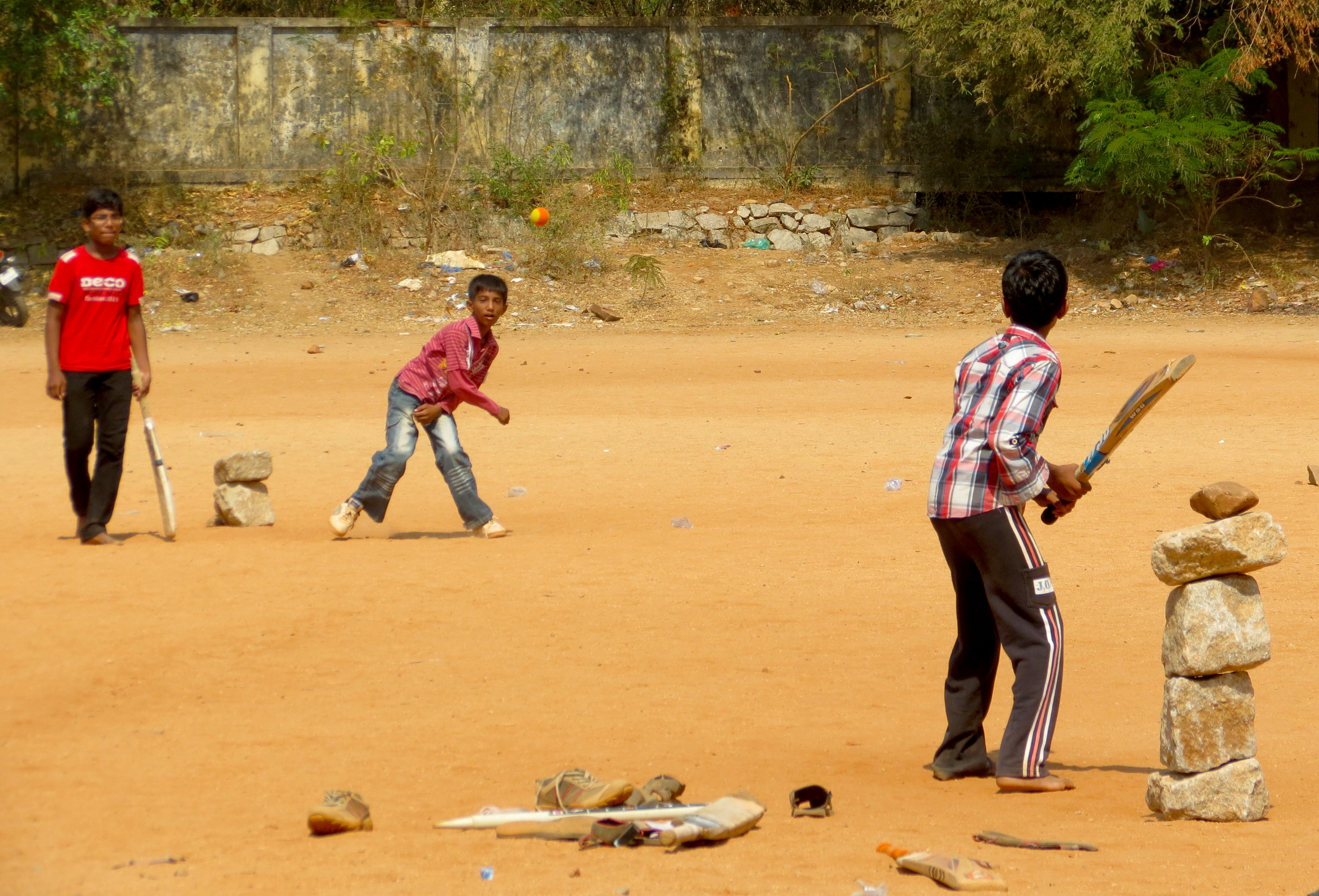
Tennis ball cricket is often played without protective gear and other make shift items such as using stones for stumps

Tennis ball cricket (or softball cricket) is a variant of cricket played using a tennis ball. It is popular in the Indian subcontinent and is also played in Middle-East, United States, Canada, Australia and Europe. A tennis ball is easier to play on uneven streets compared to a conventional hard cricket ball and is also less likely to cause injury. There is no definite record as to when this originated in the Indian subcontinent.

== History ==
Tennis ball cricket originated in the Indian subcontinent though there is no definite record as to when it started. The first Tennis Ball Cricket body was formed in 1982 known as Tennis Ball Cricket Association of India (TBCAI). Many prominent international cricketers have played some form of tennis ball cricket early in their careers.

== Rules and playing areas ==
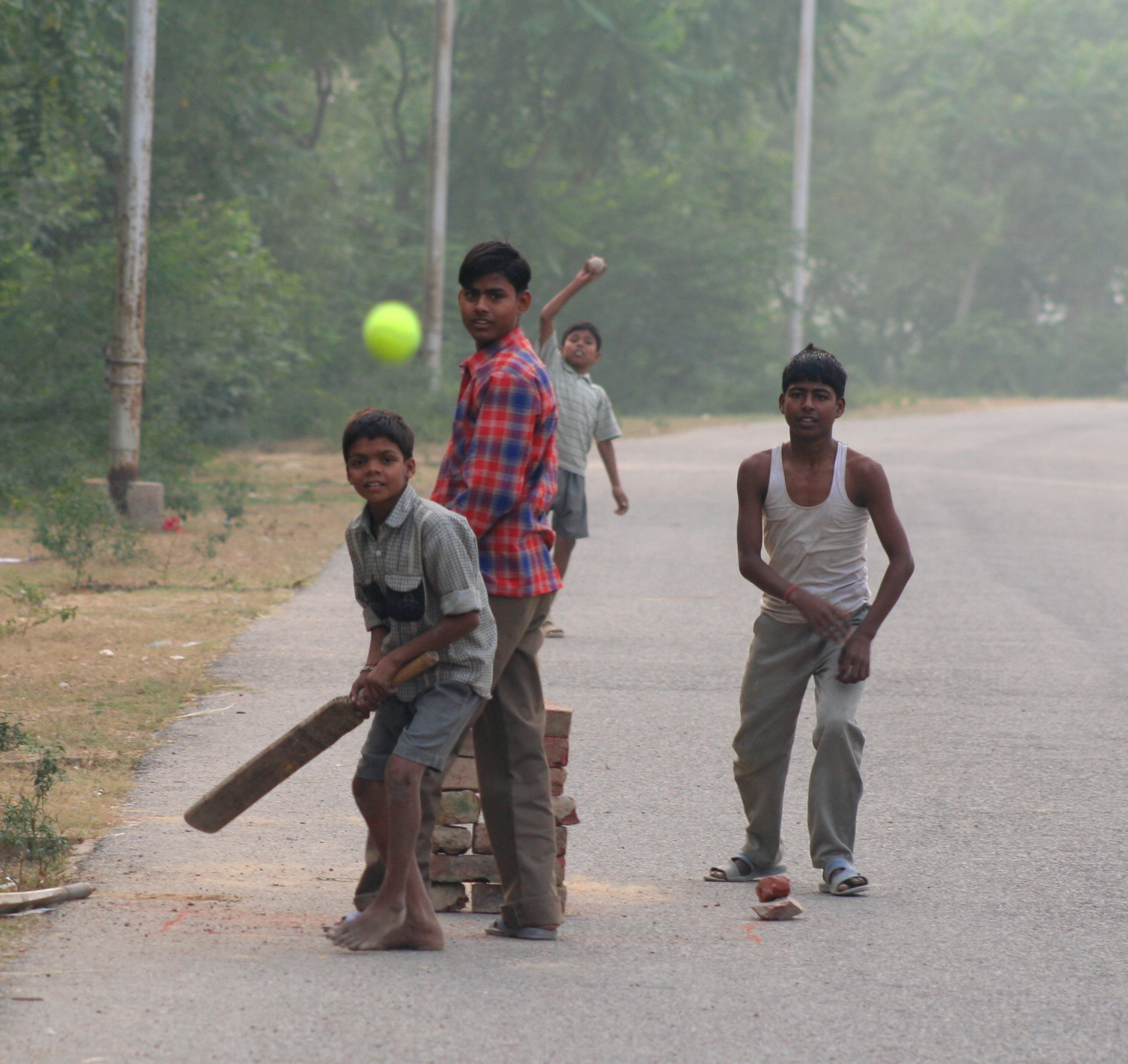
Tennis ball cricket is often played on streets

The rules of this game can vary significantly from standard cricket, and often the rules of regular cricket do not apply as they normally would. The number of overs in a game and players in a team is usually less than in a conventional cricket match. Considering that the ball is not as hard as a professional cricket ball, the use of protective gear like gloves, pads and helmets is optional. The playground can be anywhere from a house backyard to a beach to a relatively-uncrowded street, the courtyard of a school, the driveway of a residential building, agricultural fields or any open public spaces with shorter user defined boundaries and make shift stumps. In the Middle East, it is played in the open desert and baseball or soccer grounds are used in the US, Canada and Europe.

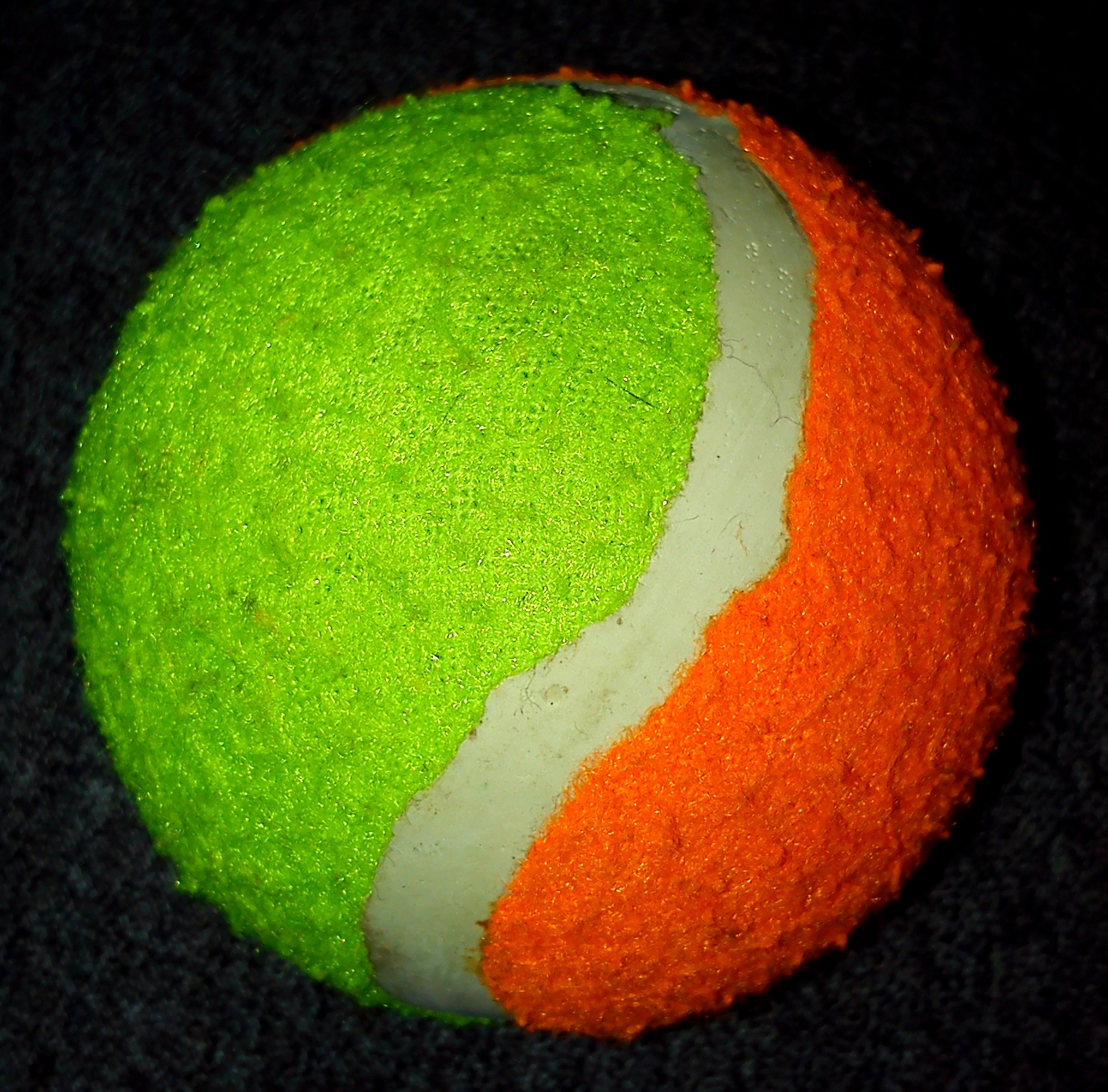
A training tennis ball

The ball used is a typical tennis ball, a ball that is intended for the sport of tennis. Tennis balls are fluorescent yellow-green in most cases but can be other colors in recreational play. Tennis balls are covered in a fibrous felt, which modifies their aerodynamic properties, and each has a white curvilinear oval covering it. The ball may be wrapped with tape (to make what is known as a tape ball) to induce swing in some cases.

== Tournaments ==
As tennis ball cricket matches are shorter and suited to recreational play, conventional tournaments have been hosted in South Asian countries and Middle East. The 10PL tournament has been organised at Sharjah Cricket Stadium since its inaugural edition in 2016, with the first three tournaments held there before the event expanded to India. With the participation of international cricketers like Robin Uthappa and Dwayne Bravo. In 2023, National Tennis Ball Cricket League was established with eight teams in India. In December 2023, The Indian Street Premier League – T10 was announced with Ravi Shastri, former Indian cricket team captain and head coach, as chief mentor. The core committee also consists of Mumbai Cricket Association president Amol Kale and BCCI treasurer Ashish Shelar. In June 2024, The Entertainers Cricket League T10 was announced as India's first social media superstars cricket league. The franchises' captains include YouTubers like Abhishek Malhan, Elvish Yadav, Munawar Faruqui, Sonu Sharma, Anurag Dwivedi, and Harsh Beniwal. Former Indian cricketer Aakash Chopra was also appointed as League commissioner. The tournament brought together leading content creators from across India to showcase their cricketing skills and passion for the game. The inaugural edition concluded with Haryana Hunters, led by Elvish Yadav, winning the final.

On May 2, 2025, Delhi based firm Servotech Sports announced Dream League of India, a one-of-a-kind Tennis-ball Cricket League which will be played among six franchise based team across the country. Sonu Sood was announced as a League Commissioner during a grand ceremony.

== See also ==
- Street cricket
