= Kookaburra Sport =

Australian sports equipment company

Kookaburra Sport Pty Ltd
- Type: Private
- Industry: Apparel; Sports equipment
- Founded: 1890; 136 years ago
- Founder: Alfred Grace Thompson
- Headquarters: Moorabbin, Melbourne, Australia
- Area served: Worldwide
- Products: Cricket balls; athletic apparel; sporting goods
- Website: kookaburrasport.com.au

Kookaburra Sport Pty Ltd (or simply Kookaburra) is an Australian sports equipment and apparel company based in Melbourne, Australia. The company was established in 1890 by Alfred Grace Thompson and specialises in manufacturing various equipment used for Australian rules football, cricket, and field hockey. The company is named after the Australian Laughing Kookaburra. The company manufactures the white Turf cricket ball used in all One-day and T20 international matches, and the red Turf ball used for Test cricket in Australia, New Zealand, South Africa, Pakistan, Sri Lanka, Bangladesh, and Zimbabwe.

== History ==
The company was established in Melbourne in 1890 by Alfred Grace (A.G.) Thompson. Born in St Ives, Cambridgeshire, England, Thompson trained as a saddler and harness maker before emigrating to Australia. The business initially traded as A.G. Thompson Pty Ltd, using "Kookaburra" as a product brand. The name was inspired by a pet kookaburra named Jacky that frequented Thompson's residence and workshop in Brighton. By the First World War, A.G. Thompson Pty Ltd had become a leading Australian manufacturer of hand-stitched cricket balls. The company later relocated from Brighton to Moorabbin in Melbourne's south-eastern suburbs, where its headquarters remain based.

Kookaburra hockey balls were first used at the 1956 Summer Olympics. During the early 1980s, the company's research and development team developed the Kookaburra Dimple hockey ball. The Dimple Elite model was introduced at the 1984 Men's Hockey World Cup and the 1984 Summer Olympics in Los Angeles, and subsequently became the standard ball used in international hockey competition.

In the mid-1980s, the company expanded its cricket range to include bats, clothing, footwear and protective equipment.

In 1990, A.G. Thompson Pty Ltd adopted the trading name Kookaburra Sport due to the strong recognition of the Kookaburra brand.

In 2002, Kookaburra acquired the British cricket ball manufacturer Alfred Reader & Co. to strengthen its presence in the English market.

In 2019, Kookaburra Sport acquired the assets and business of Australian sporting goods company Burley-Sekem, bringing together the Kookaburra and Burley brands under common ownership while retaining Australian manufacturing operations in Melbourne and Perth.

Kookaburra Sport is a 100% Australian family-owned business. In addition to its headquarters in Melbourne, the company operates offices in India, New Zealand and the United Kingdom, and maintains an agency in South Africa.

== Products ==
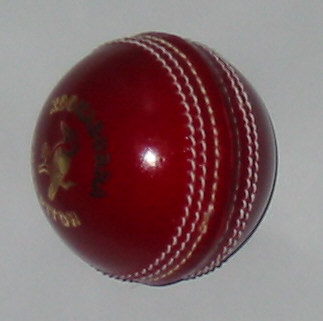
A Kookaburra cricket ball

Kookaburra manufactures sporting equipment, apparel and teamwear for cricket, field hockey and Australian rules football.

The company is best known for its cricket balls, including the white Turf ball used in One Day International and Twenty20 International cricket, and the red and pink Turf balls used in Test cricket in Australia, New Zealand, South Africa, Pakistan, Sri Lanka, Bangladesh and Zimbabwe.

In addition to cricket balls, Kookaburra produces cricket bats, protective equipment, gloves, footwear, clothing and accessories.

Kookaburra hockey balls have been used at every Olympic Games since 1956 and in international competition since the introduction of the Dimple Elite ball in 1984. The company also manufactures hockey sticks, protective equipment, apparel and accessories.

Following the acquisition of Burley-Sekem in 2019, Kookaburra expanded its Australian rules football and licensed apparel operations. The company now supplies Australian rules footballs, club merchandise, custom teamwear and apparel for sporting organisations and clubs throughout Australia.

== See also ==
- List of fitness wear brands
- British Cricket Balls Ltd
- Sanspareils Greenlands
- List of oldest companies in Australia
