= Block hole (cricket) =

Block hole, also styled as "blockhole" and "block-hole", is a cricket term referring to the part of the crease where the batter’s bat touches the ground, as well as where yorkers bounce. It may also mean the mark on a cricket pitch around the area where the batter stands, caused by tapping the bat on the ground.

== See also ==
- Glossary of cricket terms
