= 2021 Men's T20 World Cup =

Seventh edition of the ICC Men's T20 World Cup

2021 ICC Men's T20 World Cup
- Tournament logo
- Dates: 17 October – 14 November 2021
- Administrator: International Cricket Council
- Cricket format: Twenty20 International
- Tournament format(s): Group stage, Super 12s and Knockout stages
- Hosts: United Arab Emirates; Oman
- Champions: Australia (1st title)
- Runners-up: New Zealand
- Participants: 16
- Matches: 45
- Attendance: 378,895 (8,420 per match)
- Player of the series: (Australia) David Warner
- Most runs: (Pakistan) Babar Azam (303)
- Most wickets: (Sri Lanka) Wanindu Hasaranga (16)
- Official website: t20worldcup.com

The 2021 ICC Men's T20 World Cup was the seventh edition of the Men's T20 World Cup, formerly known as the ICC World Twenty20, a Twenty20 cricket tournament that took place from 17 October to 14 November 2021. The tournament was hosted by United Arab Emirates and Oman. It was scheduled to be hosted by Australia in 2020 but later postponed to 2021 due to the COVID-19 pandemic.

The tournament was scheduled to be held in Australia from 18 October to 15 November 2020. Due to the COVID-19 pandemic, the tournament was postponed to 2021, and relocated to India due to Australian entry restrictions; Australia would be awarded the 2022 tournament instead. Due to concerns over the COVID-19 pandemic situation in India, the tournament was re-located to stadiums in the United Arab Emirates and Oman, with the Board of Control for Cricket in India (BCCI) remaining the official hosts.

The West Indies were the defending champions, but were eventually eliminated in the Super 12 stage. New Zealand became the first team to reach the final, after they beat England by five wickets in the semi-finals. It was the first time that New Zealand had qualified for a T20 World Cup final. They were joined in the final by Australia, who beat Pakistan by five wickets in the second semi-final. It was the second time that Australia had qualified for the final of the T20 World Cup, after reaching the final of the 2010 tournament. In the final, Australia beat New Zealand by eight wickets to win their first T20 World Cup. Mitchell Marsh was named the Player of the Match, with David Warner being named the Player of the Tournament.

== Background ==
Australia were first awarded the tournament in February 2015, with New Zealand expected to co-host. It would have been the first time that Australia would host the men's World Twenty20. The tournament was provisionally scheduled to be held from 18 October to 15 November 2020. Prior to the 2018 Women's World Twenty20 final, the ICC announced that the men's and women's World Twenty20 would be rebranded as the "T20 World Cup" beginning in 2020, as part of a goal to heighten its profile alongside the ICC's world championships for other formats (the Cricket World Cup for ODI, and ICC World Test Championship).

In April 2020, the ICC confirmed that despite the COVID-19 pandemic, the tournament was still planned to go ahead as scheduled. However, the following month a senior ICC official said that it would be "too big a risk" to host the tournament in 2020, The ICC also stated that reports of postponing the tournament were inaccurate, with multiple contingency plans being looked at. A decision on the tournament was originally deferred until the ICC's meeting on 10 June 2020, with a further announcement scheduled to be made in July 2020. In June 2020, Earl Eddings, the chairman of Cricket Australia, said that it was "unlikely" and "unrealistic" that the tournament would take place in Australia as scheduled. Eddings also suggested that Australia could host the event in October 2021, and India stage the tournament a year later in 2022. The ICC also considered moving the tournament to be played around the next Women's Cricket World Cup, which was originally scheduled to take place in New Zealand for February 2021.

A month before the official postponement, Australian federal tourism minister Simon Birmingham announced that the Australian government expected that the country's borders would be closed to international travel until 2021. The ICC also confirmed that either Australia or India, the hosts for the tournaments originally scheduled to take place in 2020 and 2021 respectively, would host this tournament. In August 2020, the ICC confirmed that India are expected to host the 2021 tournament, with Australia expected to the 2022 tournament. In the same month, the ICC confirmed that Sri Lanka and the United Arab Emirates were being considered as back-up venues for the tournament.

In April 2021, the ICC's CEO Geoff Allardice confirmed that back-up plans were still in place if India were unable to host the tournament due to the pandemic. Later the same month, Dhiraj Malhotra of the Board of Control for Cricket in India (BCCI) confirmed that the UAE would be used as a contingency, if the pandemic in India continued to get worse. The BCCI were also in talks with Oman as a potential co-host of the tournament. On 1 June 2021, the ICC gave the BCCI the deadline of 28 June 2021 to make its decision on where the tournament would be played. Regardless of the actual location of the tournament, the ICC also confirmed that the BCCI would remain as the hosts of the competition. Later, the ICC confirmed that the tournament had been moved to the UAE and Oman. It was the first time for both the UAE and Oman to be hosting a global ICC event, and also the first occasion that a cricket World Cup was held entirely outside of the Test-playing nations.

Less than two weeks before the start of the tournament, Oman was impacted by Cyclone Shaheen which passed only a few miles north of the tournament venue in Al-Amerat. Pankaj Khimji, chairman of Oman Cricket, stated that "we were so close to being virtually wiped out [...] had this had happened over here in this area, I'd have said goodbye to the World Cup".

== Teams and qualification ==
As of 31 December 2018, the top nine ranked ICC Full Members, alongside hosts India, qualified directly for the 2021 tournament. Of those ten teams, the top eight ranked sides qualified for the Super 12s stage of the tournament. Sri Lanka and Bangladesh did not qualify for the Super 12s, instead being placed in the group stage of the competition. They were joined by the six teams who had qualified for the tournament via the 2019 ICC T20 World Cup Qualifier. Of the teams in the ICC Men's T20I Team Rankings, the United Arab Emirates and Nepal could only qualify through regional competitions. The top four teams from the group stage advanced to the Super 12s.

Papua New Guinea were the first team to secure their position via the Qualifier, after they won Group A of the tournament, finishing above the Netherlands on net run rate. It was the first time that Papua New Guinea had qualified for a World Cup in any format. Ireland became the second team to qualify via this route after they won Group B, also on net run rate.

In the first match in the playoffs, the Netherlands qualified for the T20 World Cup when they beat the United Arab Emirates by eight wickets, after the UAE only scored 80 runs in their innings. The second qualifier match saw Namibia advance to their first T20 World Cup after beating Oman by 54 runs. Scotland beat tournament hosts the United Arab Emirates in the third qualifier by 90 runs to secure their place in the T20 World Cup. Oman became the final team to qualify for the T20 World Cup, when they beat Hong Kong by 12 runs in the last playoff match.

In August 2021, concerns and doubts were raised over the participation of Afghanistan cricket team in the tournament ever since Afghanistan was brought under the control of the Taliban. Afghanistan's team media manager Hikmat Hassan confirmed that Afghanistan would play in the T20 World Cup, despite the political turmoil in the country. On 6 October 2021, the Afghanistan team left Kabul, travelling to Doha, Qatar, for a training camp before the start of the tournament.

Means of qualification	Date	Venue	Berths	Qualified
Host nation	—N/a		1	India (Note: Originally automatically qualified as original host.)
ICC Men's T20I Team Rankings (Top 9 teams in rankings who played in the last WT20, excluding the hosts)	31 December 2018	Various	9	Afghanistan; Australia; Bangladesh; England; New Zealand; Pakistan; South Africa; Sri Lanka; West Indies
2019 ICC Men's T20 World Cup Qualifier	18 October–3 November 2019	United Arab Emirates	6	Ireland; Namibia; Netherlands; Oman (Note: Replacement co-host with United Arab Emirates.); Papua New Guinea; Scotland
Total			16	

== Match officials ==
On 7 October 2021, the ICC named the match referees and the on-field umpires for the tournament. For the Super 12 match between India and New Zealand, umpire Michael Gough was replaced by Marais Erasmus after Gough was suspended for six days for breaching the tournament's bio-secure bubble. On 3 November 2021, the ICC confirmed that Gough would not officiate in any further matches in the tournament. On 9 November 2021, the match officials were confirmed for the semi-final matches, with the officials for the final being confirmed on 12 November 2021.

Match referees

- (Australia) David Boon
- (New Zealand) Jeff Crowe
- (Sri Lanka) Ranjan Madugalle
- (India) Javagal Srinath

Umpires

- (New Zealand) Chris Brown
- (Pakistan) Aleem Dar
- (Sri Lanka) Kumar Dharmasena
- (South Africa) Marais Erasmus
- (New Zealand) Chris Gaffaney
- (England) Michael Gough
- (South Africa) Adrian Holdstock
- (England) Richard Illingworth
- (England) Richard Kettleborough
- (India) Nitin Menon
- (Pakistan) Ahsan Raza
- (Australia) Paul Reiffel
- (Zimbabwe) Langton Rusere
- (Australia) Rod Tucker
- (Cricket West Indies) Joel Wilson
- (Australia) Paul Wilson

== Squads ==
Each team selected a squad of 15 players before 10 October 2021. Each team was also able to select up to seven additional players, if needed, with regards to COVID-19. On 10 August 2021, New Zealand were the first team to announce their squad for the tournament. All the teams announced their preliminary squads by 12 September 2021.

== Schedule and broadcasting ==
With a total of 45 matches, the T20 World Cup was composed of two rounds. Round 1 had twelve matches played between eight teams (Bangladesh, Sri Lanka, Ireland, Netherlands, Scotland, Namibia, Oman and Papua New Guinea), with the top four teams progressing to the Super 12s. The Super 12s consisted of 30 matches between the four teams from Round 1 and the top eight ranked T20I teams. Originally, if Sri Lanka or Bangladesh qualified from their first round groups, they would have retained their respective seedings of A1 or B1 for the Super 12s. However, the ICC later changed this rule, after Scotland topped Group B and progressed as B1. Those teams were then split into two groups of six each. This was then followed by the two semi-finals and then the final. On 16 July 2021, the ICC confirmed the groups for the tournament, which were decided on the rankings of the teams as of 20 March 2021. On 17 August 2021, the ICC confirmed the final fixtures for the tournament including the first round and super 12 matches.

The ICC named all of the official broadcasters for the tournament on its website, including details on television coverage, digital content for in-match clips and highlights, and audio listings. The official anthem of the tournament was released on 14 October 2021, by Sony Music India.

== Venues ==
On 17 April 2021, the BCCI proposed the name of the cities which are scheduled to be hosting the matches. Bangalore, Chennai, Dharamshala, Hyderabad, Kolkata, Lucknow, Mumbai, and New Delhi were the venues along with Ahmedabad, hosting the final of the event. On 18 April 2021, it was announced that Pakistan would play two of their group matches in Delhi, while Mumbai and Kolkata would host the semi-finals. On 28 June 2021, BCCI President Sourav Ganguly confirmed that due to the COVID-19 situation in the country the board has officially communicated to the ICC about their decision to move the event from India to the UAE. Some of the preliminary round matches of the event were also set to be held in Oman. On 29 June 2021, the ICC confirmed that the T20 World Cup would be played in the UAE and Oman. The tournament took place in four venues: the Dubai International Cricket Stadium, the Sheikh Zayed Cricket Stadium, the Sharjah Cricket Stadium, and the Oman Cricket Academy Ground. During July 2021, the Tolerance Oval in Abu Dhabi was awaiting accreditation by the ICC to also be used as one of the venues for the tournament.

United Arab Emirates			Oman
Dubai	Sharjah	Abu Dhabi	Muscat
Dubai International Cricket Stadium	Sharjah Cricket Stadium	Sheikh Zayed Cricket Stadium	Oman Cricket Academy Ground
Capacity: 25,000	Capacity: 27,000	Capacity: 20,000	Capacity: 3,000

Venues in UAE	Venues in Oman

== Prize money ==
On 10 October 2021, the ICC announced the prize money for the tournament.

Stage	Prize money (US$)	Teams/matches	Total
Winners	$1.6 million	1	$1,600,000
Runner-up	$800,000	1	$800,000
Losing semi-finalists	$400,000 each	2	$800,000
Bonus for winning a "Super 12" match	$40,000 per match	30	$1,200,000
Teams get knocked out in the "Super 12" stage	$70,000 each	8	$560,000
Bonus for winning a "First round" match	$40,000 per match	12	$480,000
Teams get knocked out in the "First round"	$40,000 each	4	$160,000
Total			$5,600,000

== Warm-up matches ==
The following warm-up matches for the 2021 ICC Men's T20 World Cup were played between 12 and 20 October between all participants. The first set of matches featured the teams from the groups in the first round of the main tournament, before the teams in the Super 12 phase played their warm-up matches. These matches did not have either Twenty20 International (T20I) status or T20 status as teams were allowed to field all 15 members of their squad.

Matches

=== First round warm-ups ===
12 October
14:00
Scorecard

Papua New Guinea; 96/8 (20 overs)	v	Ireland; 99/2 (16.4 overs)
Assad Vala 32 (38); Ben White 3/10 (4 overs)		Curtis Campher 42* (35); Simon Atai 1/28 (3.4 overs)

Ireland won by 8 wickets
Sheikh Zayed Stadium Nursery 2, Abu Dhabi
Umpires: Ahsan Raza (Pak) and Rod Tucker (Aus)

- Papua New Guinea won the toss and elected to bat.

12 October
18:00 (N)
Scorecard

Bangladesh; 147/7 (20 overs)	v	Sri Lanka; 148/6 (19 overs)
Soumya Sarkar 34 (26); Dushmantha Chameera 3/27 (4 overs)		Avishka Fernando 62* (42); Soumya Sarkar 2/12 (3 overs)

Sri Lanka won by 4 wickets
Tolerance Oval, Abu Dhabi
Umpires: Marais Erasmus (SA) and Langton Rusere (Zim)

- Bangladesh won the toss and elected to bat.

12 October
18:00 (N)
Scorecard

Oman; 152/8 (20 overs)	v	Namibia; 120/9 (20 overs)
Aqib Ilyas 30 (20); Jan Nicol Loftie-Eaton 2/24 (4 overs)		Gerhard Erasmus 32 (33); Kaleemullah 4/23 (4 overs)

Oman won by 32 runs
The Sevens Stadium, Dubai
Umpires: Adrian Holdstock (SA) and Richard Kettleborough (Eng)

- Oman won the toss and elected to bat.

12 October
18:00 (N)
Scorecard

Scotland; 122/6 (20 overs)	v	Netherlands; 91 (17.5 overs)
Calum MacLeod 32* (34); Timm van der Gugten 2/11 (4 overs)		Scott Edwards 22 (24); Mark Watt 4/10 (3.5 overs)

Scotland won by 31 runs
Sheikh Zayed Stadium Nursery 2, Abu Dhabi
Umpires: Kumar Dharmasena (SL) and Paul Wilson (Aus)

- Scotland won the toss and elected to bat.

14 October
10:00
Scorecard

Ireland; 177/3 (20 overs)	v	Bangladesh; 144 (20 overs)
Gareth Delany 88* (50); Taskin Ahmed 2/26 (4 overs)		Nurul Hasan 38 (24); Mark Adair 3/33 (4 overs)

Ireland won by 33 runs
Sheikh Zayed Stadium Nursery 2, Abu Dhabi
Umpires: Aleem Dar (Pak) and Rod Tucker (Aus)

- Ireland won the toss and elected to bat.

14 October
10:00
Scorecard

Sri Lanka; 162/5 (20 overs)	v	Papua New Guinea; 123/7 (20 overs)
Pathum Nissanka 76 (58); Kabua Morea 4/25 (4 overs)		Assad Vala 51 (44); Wanindu Hasaranga 2/16 (4 overs)

Sri Lanka won by 39 runs
Tolerance Oval, Abu Dhabi
Umpires: Langton Rusere (Zim) and Joel Wilson (WI)

- Sri Lanka won the toss and elected to bat.

14 October
10:00
Scorecard

Scotland; 203/7 (20 overs)	v	Namibia; 184/5 (20 overs)
George Munsey 67 (41); David Wiese 2/23 (3 overs)		Craig Williams 80 (51); Mark Watt 2/34 (4 overs)

Scotland won by 19 runs
ICC Academy Ground, Dubai
Umpires: Chris Brown (NZ) and Paul Wilson (Aus)

- Namibia won the toss and elected to field.

14 October
10:00
Scorecard

Netherlands; 165/4 (20 overs)	v	Oman; 161/8 (20 overs)
Stephan Myburgh 43 (38); Zeeshan Maqsood 1/10 (2 overs)		Aqib Ilyas 78 (48); Vivian Kingma 2/32 (4 overs)

Netherlands won by 4 runs
ICC Academy Ground 2, Dubai
Umpires: Adrian Holdstock (SA) and Paul Reiffel (Aus)

- Oman won the toss and elected to field.

=== Super 12 warm-ups ===
18 October
14:00
Scorecard

South Africa; 145/5 (20 overs)	v	Afghanistan; 104/8 (20 overs)
Aiden Markram 48 (35); Mujeeb Ur Rahman 3/24 (4 overs)		Mohammad Nabi 34* (29); Tabraiz Shamsi 3/18 (4 overs)

South Africa won by 41 runs
Tolerance Oval, Abu Dhabi
Umpires: Langton Rusere (Zim) and Paul Wilson (Aus)

- South Africa won the toss and elected to bat.

18 October
14:00
Scorecard

West Indies; 130/7 (20 overs)	v	Pakistan; 131/3 (15.3 overs)
Shimron Hetmyer 28 (24); Hasan Ali 2/21 (4 overs)		Babar Azam 50 (41); Hayden Walsh Jr. 2/41 (3.3 overs)

Pakistan won by 7 wickets
ICC Academy Ground, Dubai
Umpires: Chris Brown (NZ) and Richard Illingworth (Eng)

- West Indies won the toss and elected to bat.

18 October
18:00 (N)
Scorecard

New Zealand; 158/7 (20 overs)	v	Australia; 159/7 (19.5 overs)
Kane Williamson 37 (30); Kane Richardson 3/24 (4 overs)		Steve Smith 35 (30); Mitchell Santner 3/22 (4 overs)

Australia won by 3 wickets
Tolerance Oval, Abu Dhabi
Umpires: Michael Gough (Eng) and Nitin Menon (Ind)

- Australia won the toss and elected to field.

18 October
18:00 (N)
Scorecard

England; 188/5 (20 overs)	v	India; 192/3 (19 overs)
Jonny Bairstow 49 (36); Mohammed Shami 3/40 (4 overs)		Ishan Kishan 70* (46); Liam Livingstone 1/10 (2 overs)

India won by 7 wickets
ICC Academy Ground, Dubai
Umpires: Aleem Dar (Pak) and Joel Wilson (WI)

- India won the toss and elected to field.

20 October
14:00
Scorecard

England; 163/6 (20 overs)	v	New Zealand; 150 (19.2 overs)
Jos Buttler 73 (51); Ish Sodhi 3/26 (4 overs)		Martin Guptill 41 (20); Mark Wood 4/23 (4 overs)

England won by 13 runs
Tolerance Oval, Abu Dhabi
Umpires: Marais Erasmus (SA) and Adrian Holdstock (SA)

- New Zealand won the toss and elected to field.

20 October
14:00
Scorecard

Australia; 152/5 (20 overs)	v	India; 153/2 (17.5 overs)
Steve Smith 57 (48); Ravichandran Ashwin 2/8 (2 overs)		Rohit Sharma 60 (41); Ashton Agar 1/14 (2 overs)

India won by 8 wickets
ICC Academy Ground, Dubai
Umpires: Richard Illingworth (Eng) and Joel Wilson (WI)

- Australia won the toss and elected to bat.

20 October
18:00 (N)
Scorecard

Pakistan; 186/6 (20 overs)	v	South Africa; 190/4 (20 overs)
Fakhar Zaman 52 (28); Kagiso Rabada 3/28 (4 overs)		Rassie van der Dussen 101* (51); Imad Wasim 2/19 (3 overs)

South Africa won by 6 wickets
Tolerance Oval, Abu Dhabi
Umpires: Paul Reiffel (Aus) and Rod Tucker (Aus)

- South Africa won the toss and elected to field.

20 October
18:00 (N)
Scorecard

Afghanistan; 189/5 (20 overs)	v	West Indies; 133/5 (20 overs)
Hazratullah Zazai 56 (35); Obed McCoy 2/43 (4 overs)		Roston Chase 54* (58); Mohammad Nabi 3/2 (4 overs)

Afghanistan won by 56 runs
ICC Academy Ground, Dubai
Umpires: Chris Brown (NZ) and Aleem Dar (Pak)

- Afghanistan won the toss and elected to bat.

== First round ==
Qualification	Teams
Rankings	Bangladesh
Rankings	Sri Lanka
Advanced from Qualifier	Ireland
Advanced from Qualifier	Namibia
Advanced from Qualifier	Netherlands
Advanced from Qualifier	Oman
Advanced from Qualifier	Papua New Guinea
Advanced from Qualifier	Scotland

=== Group A ===
Pos	Team	Pld	W	L	NR	Pts	NRR	Qualification
1	Sri Lanka	3	3	0	0	6	3.754	Advanced to Super 12
2	Namibia	3	2	1	0	4	−0.523	Advanced to Super 12
3	Ireland	3	1	2	0	2	−0.853	
4	Netherlands	3	0	3	0	0	−2.460	

Source: CricketArchive

18 October 2021
14:00
Scorecard

Netherlands; 106 (20 overs)	v	Ireland; 107/3 (15.1 overs)
Max O'Dowd 51 (47); Curtis Campher 4/26 (4 overs)		Gareth Delany 44 (29); Pieter Seelaar 1/14 (2.1 overs)

Ireland won by 7 wickets
Sheikh Zayed Cricket Stadium, Abu Dhabi
Umpires: Marais Erasmus (SA) and Rod Tucker (Aus)
Player of the match: Curtis Campher (Ire)

- Netherlands won the toss and elected to bat.
- Curtis Campher became the first bowler for Ireland to take a hat-trick in T20Is.
- Curtis Campher also became the third bowler to take four wickets in four balls in T20Is.

18 October 2021
18:00 (N)
Scorecard

Namibia; 96 (19.3 overs)	v	Sri Lanka; 100/3 (13.3 overs)
Craig Williams 29 (36); Maheesh Theekshana 3/25 (4 overs)		Bhanuka Rajapaksa 42* (27); JJ Smit 1/7 (1 over)

Sri Lanka won by 7 wickets
Sheikh Zayed Cricket Stadium, Abu Dhabi
Umpires: Adrian Holdstock (SA) and Paul Reiffel (Aus)
Player of the match: Maheesh Theekshana (SL)

- Sri Lanka won the toss and elected to field.

20 October 2021
14:00
Scorecard

Netherlands; 164/4 (20 overs)	v	Namibia; 166/4 (19 overs)
Max O'Dowd 70 (56); Jan Frylinck 2/36 (4 overs)		David Wiese 66* (40); Pieter Seelaar 1/8 (2 overs)

Namibia won by 6 wickets
Sheikh Zayed Cricket Stadium, Abu Dhabi
Umpires: Michael Gough (Eng) and Langton Rusere (Zim)
Player of the match: David Wiese (Nam)

- Namibia won the toss and elected to field.

20 October 2021
18:00 (N)
Scorecard

Sri Lanka; 171/7 (20 overs)	v	Ireland; 101 (18.3 overs)
Wanindu Hasaranga 71 (47); Josh Little 4/23 (4 overs)		Andrew Balbirnie 41 (39); Maheesh Theekshana 3/17 (4 overs)

Sri Lanka won by 70 runs
Sheikh Zayed Cricket Stadium, Abu Dhabi
Umpires: Nitin Menon (Ind) and Paul Wilson (Aus)
Player of the match: Wanindu Hasaranga (SL)

- Ireland won the toss and elected to field.
- Sri Lanka qualified for the Super 12 stage of the tournament as a result of this match,

22 October 2021
14:00
Scorecard

Ireland; 125/8 (20 overs)	v	Namibia; 126/2 (18.3 overs)
Paul Stirling 38 (24); Jan Frylinck 3/21 (4 overs)		Gerhard Erasmus 53* (49); Curtis Campher 2/14 (3 overs)

Namibia won by 8 wickets
Sharjah Cricket Stadium, Sharjah
Umpires: Chris Brown (NZ) and Aleem Dar (Pak)
Player of the match: David Wiese (Nam)

- Ireland won the toss and elected to bat.
- Namibia qualified for the Super 12 stage of the tournament as a result of this match,.

22 October 2021
18:00 (N)
Scorecard

Netherlands; 44 (10 overs)	v	Sri Lanka; 45/2 (7.1 overs)
Colin Ackermann 11 (9); Lahiru Kumara 3/7 (3 overs)		Kusal Perera 33* (24); Brandon Glover 1/12 (3 overs)

Sri Lanka won by 8 wickets
Sharjah Cricket Stadium, Sharjah
Umpires: Richard Illingworth (Eng) and Joel Wilson (WI)
Player of the match: Lahiru Kumara (SL)

- Sri Lanka won the toss and elected to field.
- Ireland and Netherlands are both eliminated.

=== Group B ===
Pos	Team	Pld	W	L	NR	Pts	NRR	Qualification
1	Scotland	3	3	0	0	6	0.775	Advanced to Super 12
2	Bangladesh	3	2	1	0	4	1.733	Advanced to Super 12
3	Oman	3	1	2	0	2	−0.025	
4	Papua New Guinea	3	0	3	0	0	−2.655	

Source: CricketArchive

17 October 2021
14:00
Scorecard

Papua New Guinea; 129/9 (20 overs)	v	Oman; 131/0 (13.4 overs)
Assad Vala 56 (43); Zeeshan Maqsood 4/20 (4 overs)		Jatinder Singh 73* (42)

Oman won by 10 wickets
Oman Cricket Academy Ground Turf 1, Muscat
Umpires: Kumar Dharmasena (SL) and Chris Gaffaney (NZ)
Player of the match: Zeeshan Maqsood (Oma)

- Oman won the toss and elected to field.
- Ayaan Khan and Kashyap Prajapati (Oma) both made their T20I debuts.

17 October 2021
18:00 (N)
Scorecard

Scotland; 140/9 (20 overs)	v	Bangladesh; 134/7 (20 overs)
Chris Greaves 45 (28); Mahedi Hasan 3/19 (4 overs)		Mushfiqur Rahim 38 (36); Brad Wheal 3/24 (4 overs)

Scotland won by 6 runs
Oman Cricket Academy Ground Turf 1, Muscat
Umpires: Richard Kettleborough (Eng) and Ahsan Raza (Pak)
Player of the match: Chris Greaves (Sco)

- Bangladesh won the toss and elected to field.
- Shakib Al Hasan (Ban) became the leading wicket-taker in T20Is, taking his 108th dismissal.

19 October 2021
14:00
Scorecard

Scotland; 165/9 (20 overs)	v	Papua New Guinea; 148 (19.3 overs)
Richie Berrington 70 (49); Kabua Morea 4/31 (4 overs)		Norman Vanua 47 (37); Josh Davey 4/18 (3.3 overs)

Scotland won by 17 runs
Oman Cricket Academy Ground Turf 1, Muscat
Umpires: Kumar Dharmasena (SL) and Richard Kettleborough (Eng)
Player of the match: Richie Berrington (Sco)

- Scotland won the toss and elected to bat.

19 October 2021
18:00 (N)
Scorecard

Bangladesh; 153 (20 overs)	v	Oman; 127/9 (20 overs)
Mohammad Naim 64 (50); Bilal Khan 3/18 (4 overs)		Jatinder Singh 40 (33); Mustafizur Rahman 4/36 (4 overs)

Bangladesh won by 26 runs
Oman Cricket Academy Ground Turf 1, Muscat
Umpires: Chris Gaffaney (NZ) and Ahsan Raza (Pak)
Player of the match: Shakib Al Hasan (Ban)

- Bangladesh won the toss and elected to bat.

21 October 2021
14:00
Scorecard

Bangladesh; 181/7 (20 overs)	v	Papua New Guinea; 97 (19.3 overs)
Mahmudullah 50 (28); Assad Vala 2/26 (3 overs)		Kiplin Doriga 46* (34); Shakib Al Hasan 4/9 (4 overs)

Bangladesh won by 84 runs
Oman Cricket Academy Ground Turf 1, Muscat
Umpires: Kumar Dharmasena (SL) and Richard Kettleborough (Eng)
Player of the match: Shakib Al Hasan (Ban)

- Bangladesh won the toss and elected to bat.
- This was the biggest winning margin for Bangladesh in T20Is, in terms of runs.
- Bangladesh qualified for the Super 12 stage of the tournament as a result of this match,

21 October 2021
18:00 (N)
Scorecard

Oman; 122 (20 overs)	v	Scotland; 123/2 (17 overs)
Aqib Ilyas 37 (35); Josh Davey 3/25 (4 overs)		Kyle Coetzer 41 (28); Fayyaz Butt 1/26 (3 overs)

Scotland won by 8 wickets
Oman Cricket Academy Ground Turf 1, Muscat
Umpires: Chris Gaffaney (NZ) and Ahsan Raza (Pak)
Player of the match: Josh Davey (Sco)

- Oman won the toss and elected to bat.
- Scotland qualified for the Super 12 stage of the tournament as a result of this match, while Oman were eliminated.

== Super 12 ==
Qualification	Country
Rankings	Afghanistan
Rankings	Australia
Rankings	England
Rankings	India
Rankings	New Zealand
Rankings	Pakistan
Rankings	South Africa
Rankings	West Indies
Advanced from first round	Bangladesh
Advanced from first round	Namibia
Advanced from first round	Scotland
Advanced from first round	Sri Lanka

=== Group 1 ===
Pos	Team	Pld	W	L	NR	Pts	NRR	Qualification
1	England	5	4	1	0	8	2.464	Advanced to knockout stage
2	Australia	5	4	1	0	8	1.216	Advanced to knockout stage
3	South Africa	5	4	1	0	8	0.739	
4	Sri Lanka	5	2	3	0	4	−0.269	
5	West Indies	5	1	4	0	2	−1.641	
6	Bangladesh	5	0	5	0	0	−2.383	

Source: ESPN Cricinfo

23 October 2021
14:00
Scorecard

South Africa; 118/9 (20 overs)	v	Australia; 121/5 (19.4 overs)
Aiden Markram 40 (36); Josh Hazlewood 2/19 (4 overs)		Steve Smith 35 (34); Anrich Nortje 2/21 (4 overs)

Australia won by 5 wickets
Sheikh Zayed Cricket Stadium, Abu Dhabi
Umpires: Michael Gough (Eng) and Nitin Menon (Ind)
Player of the match: Josh Hazlewood (Aus)

- Australia won the toss and elected to field.

23 October 2021
18:00 (N)
Scorecard

West Indies; 55 (14.2 overs)	v	England; 56/4 (8.2 overs)
Chris Gayle 13 (13); Adil Rashid 4/2 (2.2 overs)		Jos Buttler 24* (22); Akeal Hosein 2/24 (4 overs)

England won by 6 wickets
Dubai International Cricket Stadium, Dubai
Umpires: Aleem Dar (Pak) and Marais Erasmus (SA)
Player of the match: Moeen Ali (Eng)

- England won the toss and elected to field.
- The West Indies' total was the lowest by a Full Member team in a men's T20 World Cup match.

24 October 2021
14:00 (N)
Scorecard

Bangladesh; 171/4 (20 overs)	v	Sri Lanka; 172/5 (18.5 overs)
Mohammad Naim 62 (52); Chamika Karunaratne 1/12 (3 overs)		Charith Asalanka 80* (49); Shakib Al Hasan 2/17 (3 overs)

Sri Lanka won by 5 wickets
Sharjah Cricket Stadium, Sharjah
Umpires: Adrian Holdstock (SA) and Joel Wilson (WI)
Player of the match: Charith Asalanka (SL)

- Sri Lanka won the toss and elected to field.
- Shakib Al Hasan (Ban) became the leading wicket-taker in men's T20 World Cup matches, with his 40th dismissal.

26 October 2021
14:00
Scorecard

West Indies; 143/8 (20 overs)	v	South Africa; 144/2 (18.2 overs)
Evin Lewis 56 (35); Dwaine Pretorius 3/17 (2 overs)		Aiden Markram 51* (26); Akeal Hosein 1/27 (4 overs)

South Africa won by 8 wickets
Dubai International Cricket Stadium, Dubai
Umpires: Aleem Dar (Pak) and Paul Reiffel (Aus)
Player of the match: Anrich Nortje (SA)

- South Africa won the toss and elected to field.

27 October 2021
14:00
Scorecard

Bangladesh; 124/9 (20 overs)	v	England; 126/2 (14.1 overs)
Mushfiqur Rahim 29 (30); Tymal Mills 3/27 (4 overs)		Jason Roy 61 (38); Nasum Ahmed 1/26 (3 overs)

England won by 8 wickets
Sheikh Zayed Cricket Stadium, Abu Dhabi
Umpires: Nitin Menon (Ind) and Langton Rusere (Zim)
Player of the match: Jason Roy (Eng)

- Bangladesh won the toss and elected to bat.

28 October 2021
18:00 (N)
Scorecard

Sri Lanka; 154/6 (20 overs)	v	Australia; 155/3 (17 overs)
Kusal Perera 35 (25); Adam Zampa 2/12 (4 overs)		David Warner 65 (42); Wanindu Hasaranga 2/22 (4 overs)

Australia won by 7 wickets
Dubai International Cricket Stadium, Dubai
Umpires: Aleem Dar (Pak) and Richard Illingworth (Eng)
Player of the match: Adam Zampa (Aus)

- Australia won the toss and elected to field.

29 October 2021
14:00
Scorecard

West Indies; 142/7 (20 overs)	v	Bangladesh; 139/5 (20 overs)
Nicholas Pooran 40 (22); Shoriful Islam 2/20 (4 overs)		Litton Das 44 (43); Jason Holder 1/22 (4 overs)

West Indies won by 3 runs
Sharjah Cricket Stadium, Sharjah
Umpires: Adrian Holdstock (SA) and Rod Tucker (Aus)
Player of the match: Nicholas Pooran (WI)

- Bangladesh won the toss and elected to field.
- Roston Chase (WI) made his T20I debut.

30 October 2021
14:00
Scorecard

Sri Lanka; 142 (20 overs)	v	South Africa; 146/6 (19.5 overs)
Pathum Nissanka 72 (58); Tabraiz Shamsi 3/17 (4 overs)		Temba Bavuma 46 (46); Wanindu Hasaranga 3/20 (4 overs)

South Africa won by 4 wickets
Sharjah Cricket Stadium, Sharjah
Umpires: Joel Wilson (WI) and Paul Wilson (Aus)
Player of the match: Tabraiz Shamsi (SA)

- South Africa won the toss and elected to field.
- Wanindu Hasaranga became the first bowler for Sri Lanka to take a hat-trick in a T20 World Cup match.

30 October 2021
18:00 (N)
Scorecard

Australia; 125 (20 overs)	v	England; 126/2 (11.4 overs)
Aaron Finch 44 (49); Chris Jordan 3/17 (4 overs)		Jos Buttler 71* (32); Ashton Agar 1/15 (2.4 overs)

England won by 8 wickets
Dubai International Cricket Stadium, Dubai
Umpires: Marais Erasmus (SA) and Nitin Menon (Ind)
Player of the match: Chris Jordan (Eng)

- England won the toss and elected to field.

1 November 2021
18:00 (N)
Scorecard

England; 163/4 (20 overs)	v	Sri Lanka; 137 (19 overs)
Jos Buttler 101* (67); Wanindu Hasaranga 3/21 (4 overs)		Wanindu Hasaranga 34 (21); Moeen Ali 2/15 (3 overs)

England won by 26 runs
Sharjah Cricket Stadium, Sharjah
Umpires: Adrian Holdstock (SA) and Rod Tucker (Aus)
Player of the match: Jos Buttler (Eng)

- Sri Lanka won the toss and elected to field.
- Jos Buttler (Eng) scored his first century in T20Is.
- Wanindu Hasaranga (SL) took his 50th wicket in T20Is.
- Eoin Morgan (Eng) won his 43rd match as captain to become the most successful captain in T20Is.

2 November 2021
14:00
Scorecard

Bangladesh; 84 (18.2 overs)	v	South Africa; 86/4 (13.3 overs)
Mahedi Hasan 27 (25); Anrich Nortje 3/8 (3.2 overs)		Temba Bavuma 31* (28); Taskin Ahmed 2/18 (4 overs)

South Africa won by 6 wickets
Sheikh Zayed Cricket Stadium, Abu Dhabi
Umpires: Richard Illingworth (Eng) and Paul Reiffel (Aus)
Player of the match: Kagiso Rabada (SA)

- South Africa won the toss and elected to field.
- Sri Lanka and Bangladesh are both eliminated as a result of this match.

4 November 2021
14:00
Scorecard

Bangladesh; 73 (15 overs)	v	Australia; 78/2 (6.2 overs)
Shamim Hossain 19 (18); Adam Zampa 5/19 (4 overs)		Aaron Finch 40 (20); Shoriful Islam 1/9 (1 over)

Australia won by 8 wickets
Dubai International Cricket Stadium, Dubai
Umpires: Kumar Dharmasena (SL) and Nitin Menon (Ind)
Player of the match: Adam Zampa (Aus)

- Australia won the toss and elected to field.
- Adam Zampa (Aus) took his first five-wicket haul in T20Is.

4 November 2021
18:00 (N)
Scorecard

Sri Lanka; 189/3 (20 overs)	v	West Indies; 169/8 (20 overs)
Charith Asalanka 68 (41); Andre Russell 2/33 (4 overs)		Shimron Hetmyer 81* (54); Wanindu Hasaranga 2/19 (4 overs)

Sri Lanka won by 20 runs
Sheikh Zayed Cricket Stadium, Abu Dhabi
Umpires: Aleem Dar (Pak) and Langton Rusere (Zim)
Player of the match: Charith Asalanka (SL)

- West Indies won the toss and elected to field.
- West Indies are eliminated as a result of this match.

6 November 2021
14:00
Scorecard

West Indies; 157/7 (20 overs)	v	Australia; 161/2 (16.2 overs)
Kieron Pollard 44 (31); Josh Hazlewood 4/39 (4 overs)		David Warner 89* (56); Chris Gayle 1/7 (1 over)

Australia won by 8 wickets
Sheikh Zayed Cricket Stadium, Abu Dhabi
Umpires: Richard Illingworth (Eng) and Langton Rusere (Zim)
Player of the match: David Warner (Aus)

- Australia won the toss and elected to field.
- Chris Gayle played his final T20 game.

6 November 2021
18:00 (N)
Scorecard

South Africa; 189/2 (20 overs)	v	England; 179/8 (20 overs)
Rassie van der Dussen 94* (60); Moeen Ali 1/27 (4 overs)		Moeen Ali 37 (27); Kagiso Rabada 3/48 (4 overs)

South Africa won by 10 runs
Sharjah Cricket Stadium, Sharjah
Umpires: Chris Brown (NZ) and Joel Wilson (WI)
Player of the match: Rassie van der Dussen (SA)

- England won the toss and elected to field.
- Kagiso Rabada became the first bowler for South Africa to take a hat-trick in T20Is.
- England and Australia both qualified for the semi-finals as a result of this match, while South Africa was eliminated.

=== Group 2 ===
Pos	Team	Pld	W	L	NR	Pts	NRR	Qualification
1	Pakistan	5	5	0	0	10	1.583	Advanced to knockout stage
2	New Zealand	5	4	1	0	8	1.162	Advanced to knockout stage
3	India	5	3	2	0	6	1.747	
4	Afghanistan	5	2	3	0	4	1.053	
5	Namibia	5	1	4	0	2	−1.890	
6	Scotland	5	0	5	0	0	−3.543	

Source: ESPN Cricinfo

24 October 2021
18:00 (N)
Scorecard

India; 151/7 (20 overs)	v	Pakistan; 152/0 (17.5 overs)
Virat Kohli 57 (49); Shaheen Afridi 3/31 (4 overs)		Mohammad Rizwan 79* (55)

Pakistan won by 10 wickets
Dubai International Cricket Stadium, Dubai
Umpires: Marais Erasmus (SA) and Chris Gaffaney (NZ)
Player of the match: Shaheen Afridi (Pak)

- Pakistan won the toss and elected to field.
- This was the 200th international cricket match between India and Pakistan.
- This was the first time in 13 attempts that Pakistan had beaten India in either a Cricket World Cup or T20 World Cup match.
- This was the first time that India had lost by 10 wickets in T20Is.

25 October 2021
18:00 (N)
Scorecard

Afghanistan; 190/4 (20 overs)	v	Scotland; 60 (10.2 overs)
Najibullah Zadran 59 (34); Safyaan Sharif 2/33 (4 overs)		George Munsey 25 (18); Mujeeb Ur Rahman 5/20 (4 overs)

Afghanistan won by 130 runs
Sharjah Cricket Stadium, Sharjah
Umpires: Kumar Dharmasena (SL) and Paul Wilson (Aus)
Player of the match: Mujeeb Ur Rahman (Afg)

- Afghanistan won the toss and elected to bat.
- Mujeeb Ur Rahman (Afg) took his first five-wicket haul in T20Is.
- Mujeeb Ur Rahman became the first player to take a five-wicket haul on T20 World Cup debut.
- In terms of runs, this was Afghanistan's biggest winning margin in T20Is.

26 October 2021
18:00 (N)
Scorecard

New Zealand; 134/8 (20 overs)	v	Pakistan; 135/5 (18.4 overs)
Daryl Mitchell 27 (20); Haris Rauf 4/22 (4 overs)		Mohammad Rizwan 33 (34); Ish Sodhi 2/28 (4 overs)

Pakistan won by 5 wickets
Sharjah Cricket Stadium, Sharjah
Umpires: Michael Gough and Richard Kettleborough (Eng)
Player of the match: Haris Rauf (Pak)

- Pakistan won the toss and elected to field.
- Tim Southee (NZ) took his 100th wicket in T20Is.

27 October 2021
18:00 (N)
Scorecard

Scotland; 109/8 (20 overs)	v	Namibia; 115/6 (19.1 overs)
Michael Leask 44 (27); Ruben Trumpelmann 3/17 (4 overs)		JJ Smit 32* (23); Michael Leask 2/12 (2 overs)

Namibia won by 4 wickets
Sheikh Zayed Cricket Stadium, Abu Dhabi
Umpires: Adrian Holdstock (SA) and Rod Tucker (Aus)
Player of the match: Ruben Trumpelmann (Nam)

- Namibia won the toss and elected to field.

29 October 2021
18:00 (N)
Scorecard

Afghanistan; 147/6 (20 overs)	v	Pakistan; 148/5 (19 overs)
Gulbadin Naib 35* (25); Imad Wasim 2/25 (4 overs)		Babar Azam 51 (47); Rashid Khan 2/26 (4 overs)

Pakistan won by 5 wickets
Dubai International Cricket Stadium, Dubai
Umpires: Chris Brown (NZ) and Joel Wilson (WI)
Player of the match: Asif Ali (Pak)

- Afghanistan won the toss and elected to bat.
- Rashid Khan (Afg) became the fastest bowler, in terms of matches, to take 100 wickets in T20Is (53).
- Babar Azam (Pak) became the fastest player, in terms of innings, to score 1,000 runs as captain in T20Is (26).

31 October 2021
14:00
Scorecard

Afghanistan; 160/5 (20 overs)	v	Namibia; 98/9 (20 overs)
Mohammad Shahzad 45 (33); Jan Nicol Loftie-Eaton 2/21 (4 overs)		David Wiese 26 (30); Hamid Hassan 3/9 (4 overs)

Afghanistan won by 62 runs
Sheikh Zayed Cricket Stadium, Abu Dhabi
Umpires: Chris Gaffaney (NZ) and Ahsan Raza (Pak)
Player of the match: Naveen-ul-Haq (Afg)

- Afghanistan won the toss and elected to bat.
- Mohammad Shahzad became the first player for Afghanistan to score 2,000 runs in T20Is.

31 October 2021
18:00 (N)
Scorecard

India; 110/7 (20 overs)	v	New Zealand; 111/2 (14.3 overs)
Ravindra Jadeja 26* (19); Trent Boult 3/20 (4 overs)		Daryl Mitchell 49 (35); Jasprit Bumrah 2/19 (4 overs)

New Zealand won by 8 wickets
Dubai International Cricket Stadium, Dubai
Umpires: Marais Erasmus (SA) and Richard Kettleborough (Eng)
Player of the match: Ish Sodhi (NZ)

- New Zealand won the toss and elected to field.

2 November 2021
18:00 (N)
Scorecard

Pakistan; 189/2 (20 overs)	v	Namibia; 144/5 (20 overs)
Mohammad Rizwan 79* (50); David Wiese 1/30 (4 overs)		David Wiese 43* (31); Imad Wasim 1/13 (3 overs)

Pakistan won by 45 runs
Sheikh Zayed Cricket Stadium, Abu Dhabi
Umpires: Chris Brown (NZ) and Chris Gaffaney (NZ)
Player of the match: Mohammad Rizwan (Pak)

- Pakistan won the toss and elected to bat.
- Pakistan qualified for the semi-finals as a result of this match.

3 November 2021
14:00
Scorecard

New Zealand; 172/5 (20 overs)	v	Scotland; 156/5 (20 overs)
Martin Guptill 93 (56); Safyaan Sharif 2/28 (4 overs)		Michael Leask 42* (20); Trent Boult 2/29 (4 overs)

New Zealand won by 16 runs
Dubai International Cricket Stadium, Dubai
Umpires: Marais Erasmus (SA) and Ahsan Raza (Pak)
Player of the match: Martin Guptill (NZ)

- Scotland won the toss and elected to field.
- Martin Guptill (NZ) became the second batter to score 3,000 runs in T20Is.

3 November 2021
18:00 (N)
Scorecard

India; 210/2 (20 overs)	v	Afghanistan; 144/7 (20 overs)
Rohit Sharma 74 (47); Karim Janat 1/7 (1 over)		Karim Janat 42* (22); Mohammed Shami 3/32 (4 overs)

India won by 66 runs
Sheikh Zayed Cricket Stadium, Abu Dhabi
Umpires: Richard Kettleborough (Eng) and Paul Reiffel (Aus)
Player of the match: Rohit Sharma (Ind)

- Afghanistan won the toss and elected to field.

5 November 2021
14:00
Scorecard

New Zealand; 163/4 (20 overs)	v	Namibia; 111/7 (20 overs)
Glenn Phillips 39* (21); Bernard Scholtz 1/15 (3 overs)		Michael van Lingen 25 (25); Tim Southee 2/15 (4 overs)

New Zealand won by 52 runs
Sharjah Cricket Stadium, Sharjah
Umpires: Paul Reiffel (Aus) and Paul Wilson (Aus)
Player of the match: James Neesham (NZ)

- Namibia won the toss and elected to field.
- Scotland and Namibia are both eliminated as a result of this match.

5 November 2021
18:00 (N)
Scorecard

Scotland; 85 (17.4 overs)	v	India; 89/2 (6.3 overs)
George Munsey 24 (19); Mohammed Shami 3/15 (3 overs)		KL Rahul 50 (19); Mark Watt 1/20 (2 overs)

India won by 8 wickets
Dubai International Cricket Stadium, Dubai
Umpires: Marais Erasmus (SA) and Rod Tucker (Aus)
Player of the match: Ravindra Jadeja (Ind)

- India won the toss and elected to field.
- KL Rahul (Ind) scored the joint-fastest fifty of the tournament (18 balls).

7 November 2021
14:00
Scorecard

Afghanistan; 124/8 (20 overs)	v	New Zealand; 125/2 (18.1 overs)
Najibullah Zadran 73 (48); Trent Boult 3/17 (4 overs)		Kane Williamson 40* (42); Rashid Khan 1/27 (4 overs)

New Zealand won by 8 wickets
Sheikh Zayed Cricket Stadium, Abu Dhabi
Umpires: Kumar Dharmasena (SL) and Langton Rusere (Zim)
Player of the match: Trent Boult (NZ)

- Afghanistan won the toss and elected to bat.
- Rashid Khan (Afg) took his 400th wicket in Twenty20 cricket.
- New Zealand qualified for the semi-finals as a result of this match, while India and Afghanistan was both eliminated.

7 November 2021
18:00 (N)
Scorecard

Pakistan; 189/4 (20 overs)	v	Scotland; 117/6 (20 overs)
Babar Azam 66 (47); Chris Greaves 2/43 (4 overs)		Richie Berrington 54* (37); Shadab Khan 2/14 (4 overs)

Pakistan won by 72 runs
Sharjah Cricket Stadium, Sharjah
Umpires: Rod Tucker (Aus) and Paul Wilson (Aus)
Player of the match: Shoaib Malik (Pak)

- Pakistan won the toss and elected to bat.
- Shoaib Malik (Pak) scored the joint-fastest fifty of the tournament (18 balls).

8 November 2021
18:00 (N)
Scorecard

Namibia; 132/8 (20 overs)	v	India; 136/1 (15.2 overs)
David Wiese 26 (25); Ravindra Jadeja 3/16 (4 overs)		Rohit Sharma 56 (37); Jan Frylinck 1/19 (2 overs)

India won by 9 wickets
Dubai International Cricket Stadium, Dubai
Umpires: Chris Brown (NZ) and Richard Illingworth (Eng)
Player of the match: Ravindra Jadeja (Ind)

- India won the toss and elected to field.
- Virat Kohli captained India for the 50th time in T20Is.
- This was India's 150th T20I.

== Knockout stage ==
Semi-finals
①1	England	166/4 (20 overs)
②2	New Zealand	167/5 (19 overs)
②1	Pakistan	176/4 (20 overs)
①2	Australia	177/5 (19 overs)

Final
②2	New Zealand	172/4 (20 overs)
①2	Australia	173/2 (18.5 overs)

=== Semi-finals ===
10 November 2021
18:00 (N)
Scorecard

England; 166/4 (20 overs)	v	New Zealand; 167/5 (19 overs)
Moeen Ali 51* (37); James Neesham 1/18 (2 overs)		Daryl Mitchell 72* (47); Liam Livingstone 2/22 (4 overs)

New Zealand won by 5 wickets
Sheikh Zayed Cricket Stadium, Abu Dhabi
Umpires: Kumar Dharmasena (SL) and Marais Erasmus (SA)
Player of the match: Daryl Mitchell (NZ)

- New Zealand won the toss and elected to field.

11 November 2021
18:00 (N)
Scorecard

Pakistan; 176/4 (20 overs)	v	Australia; 177/5 (19 overs)
Mohammad Rizwan 67 (52); Mitchell Starc 2/38 (4 overs)		David Warner 49 (30); Shadab Khan 4/26 (4 overs)

Australia won by 5 wickets
Dubai International Cricket Stadium, Dubai
Umpires: Chris Gaffaney (NZ) and Richard Kettleborough (Eng)
Player of the match: Matthew Wade (Aus)

- Australia won the toss and elected to field.

=== Final ===
14 November 2021
18:00 (N)
Scorecard

New Zealand; 172/4 (20 overs)	v	Australia; 173/2 (18.5 overs)
Kane Williamson 85 (48); Josh Hazlewood 3/16 (4 overs)		Mitchell Marsh 77* (50); Trent Boult 2/18 (4 overs)

Australia won by 8 wickets
Dubai International Cricket Stadium, Dubai
Umpires: Marais Erasmus (SA) and Richard Kettleborough (Eng)
Player of the match: Mitchell Marsh (Aus)

- Australia won the toss and elected to field.
- Australia won their maiden T20 World Cup title.

== Statistics ==
The leading run-scorer in the tournament was Babar Azam, with 303. The leading wicket-taker was Wanindu Hasaranga, who took 16 dismissals, the most by a bowler in a single edition of the T20 World Cup.

Most runs
Runs	Player	Team
303	Babar Azam	Pakistan
289	David Warner	Australia
281	Mohammad Rizwan	Pakistan
269	Jos Buttler	England
231	Charith Asalanka	Sri Lanka

- Source: Cricinfo

Most wickets
Wickets	Player	Team
16	Wanindu Hasaranga	Sri Lanka
13	Adam Zampa	Australia
13	Trent Boult	New Zealand
11	Shakib Al Hasan	Bangladesh
11	Josh Hazlewood	Australia

- Source: Cricinfo

== Team of the tournament ==
On 14 November 2021, the ICC announced its team of the tournament, with David Warner being named as player of the tournament and Babar Azam as the captain of the team.

Player	Team	Role
David Warner	Australia	Batter
Jos Buttler	England	Wicket-keeper
Babar Azam	Pakistan	Batter
Charith Asalanka	Sri Lanka	Batter
Aiden Markram	South Africa	Batter
Moeen Ali	England	All-rounder
Wanindu Hasaranga	Sri Lanka	All-rounder
Adam Zampa	Australia	Bowler
Josh Hazlewood	Australia	Bowler
Trent Boult	New Zealand	Bowler
Anrich Nortje	South Africa	Bowler
Shaheen Afridi	Pakistan	12th
