= Samreen Kaur =

Indian actress and model (born 1999)

- Born: 7 September 1999 (age 27); Jammu, Jammu & Kashmir, India
- Occupations: Actress; Model
- Years active: 2018–present
- Partner: Arshdeep Singh (eng. 2026)

Samreen Kaur (born 7 September 1999) is an Indian actress and model known for her appearances in Hindi and Punjabi films and music videos. She is best known for her roles in Sardaar Ji 2 (2016), Nail Polish (2021), and 83 (2021), as well as her appearances in several popular music videos by artists such as Badshah, Guru Randhawa, and Maninder Buttar.

== Early life ==
Samreen was born on 7 September 1999 in Jammu, Jammu & Kashmir, India. Her mother is a government college professor, and her father is a businessman in the educational supplies sector. She has a younger brother named Rajveer. She completed her Bachelor of Commerce degree at the Symbiosis College of Arts and Commerce in Pune. Initially, she planned to join her father's business before pursuing a career in modelling and acting. Her first acting offer came while she was in the 12th grade at the age of 17, but her father declined it due to her young age at the time.

== Career ==
=== Modelling and pageants ===
Kaur began her career as a model, participating in ramp walks and TV commercials. In 2018, she auditioned for the Femina Miss India beauty pageant and was selected as a state finalist representing Jammu and Kashmir.

=== Acting ===
Kaur made her film debut in the Punjabi-language film Sardaar Ji 2. She also acted in the Hindi-language film 83 (2021), a sports drama directed by Kabir Khan and starring Ranveer Singh. And later appeared as Charu Raina in Nail Polish (2021), a legal thriller released on ZEE5, starring Arjun Rampal and Manav Kaul. She also acted in the Punjabi-language film Sardaar Ji 2. In 2024, she featured in the music video Ishq sung by Faheem Abdullah.

=== Media appearances ===
2025, during Jackson Wang’s visit to India, Samreen Kaur accompanied him as he explored Mumbai’s street food and traditional cultural experiences.

== Filmography ==
Year	Title	Role	Language
2016	Sardaar Ji 2	Shiney	Punjabi
2021	Nail Polish	Charu Raina	Hindi
2021	83	Simran	Hindi

== Music videos ==
Year	Title	Artist(s)
2020	Botal Free	Jordan Sandhu
2020	Yaara Tere Warga	Jass Manak
2021	Mombattiyaan	Maninder Buttar
2021	Tujhe Bhoolna Toh Chaaha	Jubin Nautiyal
2021	Baawla	Badshah ft. Amit Uchana
2024	Harjayi Ve	Harsh Kargeti, Afsana Khan
2024	Damn Serious	Aatish ft. Samreen Kaur
2024	Ishq	Faheem Abdullah
