= South African cricket team in India in 2022–23 =

International cricket tour

| | India | South Africa |
- Dates: 28 September – 11 October 2022
| Captains | Shikhar Dhawan (ODIs); Rohit Sharma (T20Is) | Temba Bavuma (Note: Keshav Maharaj and David Miller captained South Africa in the second and the third ODIs respectively.) |

One Day International series
- Results: India won the 3-match series 2–1
| Most runs | Shreyas Iyer (191) | Heinrich Klaasen (138) |
| Most wickets | Kuldeep Yadav (6) | Lungi Ngidi (4) |
- Player of the series: Mohammed Siraj (Ind)

Twenty20 International series
- Results: India won the 3-match series 2–1
| Most runs | Suryakumar Yadav (119) | Quinton de Kock (138) |
| Most wickets | Arshdeep Singh (5) | Keshav Maharaj (4) |
- Player of the series: Suryakumar Yadav (Ind)

The South African cricket team toured India in September and October 2022 to play three One Day International (ODI) and three Twenty20 International (T20I) matches as a preparatory series before the 2022 ICC Men's T20 World Cup. In August 2022, the Board of Control for Cricket in India (BCCI) confirmed the schedule for the tour. The ODI series formed part of the inaugural 2020–2023 ICC Cricket World Cup Super League.

== Squads ==
| ODIs | | T20Is | |
| India | South Africa | India | South Africa |
|---|---|---|---|
| Shikhar Dhawan (c); Shreyas Iyer (vc); Shahbaz Ahmed; Ravi Bishnoi; ~~Deepak Chahar~~; Ruturaj Gaikwad; Shubman Gill; Ishan Kishan (wk); Avesh Khan; Mukesh Kumar; Rajat Patidar; Sanju Samson (wk); Mohammed Siraj; Washington Sundar; Rahul Tripathi; Shardul Thakur; Kuldeep Yadav | Temba Bavuma (c); Quinton de Kock (wk); Bjorn Fortuin; Reeza Hendricks; Marco Jansen; Heinrich Klaasen; Keshav Maharaj; Janneman Malan; Aiden Markram; David Miller; Lungi Ngidi; Anrich Nortje; Wayne Parnell; Andile Phehlukwayo; ~~Dwaine Pretorius~~; Kagiso Rabada; Tabraiz Shamsi | Rohit Sharma (c); KL Rahul (vc); Shahbaz Ahmed; Ravichandran Ashwin; ~~Jasprit Bumrah~~; Yuzvendra Chahal; Deepak Chahar; ~~Deepak Hooda~~; Shreyas Iyer; Dinesh Karthik (wk); Virat Kohli; Rishabh Pant (wk); Axar Patel; Harshal Patel; ~~Mohammed Shami~~; Mohammed Siraj; Arshdeep Singh; Suryakumar Yadav; Umesh Yadav | Temba Bavuma (c); Quinton de Kock (wk); Reeza Hendricks; Heinrich Klaasen; Keshav Maharaj; Aiden Markram; David Miller; Lungi Ngidi; Anrich Nortje; Wayne Parnell; Dwaine Pretorius; Kagiso Rabada; Rilee Rossouw; Tabraiz Shamsi; Tristan Stubbs |

South Africa also named Bjorn Fortuin, Marco Jansen and Andile Phehlukwayo as standby players for the T20I squad. Deepak Hooda and Mohammed Shami were ruled out of India's T20I squad and were replaced by Shreyas Iyer and Umesh Yadav, respectively. Shahbaz Ahmed also was added to India's T20I squad. On 30 September, Mohammed Siraj was added as a replacement for Jasprit Bumrah, who was ruled of the T20I series due to a back injury. South Africa's Dwaine Pretorius was ruled out of the ODI squad after sustaining a fractured thumb during the third T20I, with Marco Jansen being named as his replacement. Before the second ODI, Deepak Chahar was ruled out of the ODI series due to stiffness in his back and was replaced by Washington Sundar.

== T20I series ==
=== 1st T20I ===
28 September 2022
19:00 (N)
Scorecard

| South Africa; 106/8 (20 overs) | v | India; 110/2 (16.4 overs) |
| Keshav Maharaj 41 (35); Arshdeep Singh 3/32 (4 overs) | | KL Rahul 51* (56); Kagiso Rabada 1/16 (4 overs) |

India won by 8 wickets
Greenfield International Stadium, Thiruvananthapuram
Umpires: Anil Chaudhary (Ind) and Nitin Menon (Ind)
Player of the match: Arshdeep Singh (Ind)

- India won the toss and elected to field.

=== 2nd T20I ===
2 October 2022
19:00 (N)
Scorecard

| India; 237/3 (20 overs) | v | South Africa; 221/3 (20 overs) |
| Suryakumar Yadav 61 (22); Keshav Maharaj 2/23 (4 overs) | | David Miller 106* (47); Arshdeep Singh 2/62 (4 overs) |

India won by 16 runs
Assam Cricket Association Stadium, Guwahati
Umpires: Anil Chaudhary (Ind) and Virender Sharma (Ind)
Player of the match: KL Rahul (Ind)

- South Africa won the toss and elected to field.
- Suryakumar Yadav (Ind) scored his 1,000th run in T20Is.
- Virat Kohli (Ind) became the first Indian and fastest overall to score 11,000 runs in terms of matches in T20s (354).
- David Miller (SA) became the first South African cricketer to score 2,000 runs in T20Is.
- David Miller and Quinton de Kock set a new record for the highest partnership for the fourth wicket in T20Is and the highest partnership for any wicket for South Africa in T20Is with an unbeaten 174 runs.

=== 3rd T20I ===
4 October 2022
19:00 (N)
Scorecard

| South Africa; 227/3 (20 overs) | v | India; 178 (18.3 overs) |
| Rilee Rossouw 100* (48); Umesh Yadav 1/34 (3 overs) | | Dinesh Karthik 46 (21); Dwaine Pretorius 3/26 (3.3 overs) |

South Africa won by 49 runs
Holkar Stadium, Indore
Umpires: Jayaraman Madanagopal (Ind) and Virender Sharma (Ind)
Player of the match: Rilee Rossouw (SA)

- India won the toss and elected to field.
- Quinton de Kock (SA) became the second South African cricketer to score 2000 runs in T20Is.
- Rilee Rossouw (SA) scored his first century in T20Is.
- Umesh Yadav (Ind) played his last T20I.

== ODI series ==
=== 1st ODI ===
6 October 2022
13:30 (D/N)
Scorecard

| South Africa; 249/4 (40 overs) | v | India; 240/8 (40 overs) |
| David Miller 75* (63); Shardul Thakur 2/35 (8 overs) | | Sanju Samson 86* (63); Lungi Ngidi 3/52 (8 overs) |

South Africa won by 9 runs
Ekana Cricket Stadium, Lucknow
Umpires: Anil Chaudhary (Ind) and Jayaraman Madanagopal (Ind)
Player of the match: Heinrich Klaasen (SA)

- India won the toss and elected to field.
- The match was reduced to 40 overs per side due to rain.
- Ravi Bishnoi and Ruturaj Gaikwad (Ind) both made their ODI debuts.
- World Cup Super League points: South Africa 10, India 0.

=== 2nd ODI ===
9 October 2022
13:30 (D/N)
Scorecard

| South Africa; 278/7 (50 overs) | v | India; 282/3 (45.5 overs) |
| Aiden Markram 79 (89); Mohammed Siraj 3/38 (10 overs) | | Shreyas Iyer 113* (111); Wayne Parnell 1/44 (8 overs) |

India won by 7 wickets
JSCA International Stadium Complex, Ranchi
Umpires: K. N. Ananthapadmanabhan (Ind) and Virender Sharma (Ind)
Player of the match: Shreyas Iyer (Ind)

- South Africa won the toss and elected to bat.
- Shahbaz Ahmed (Ind) made his ODI debut.
- Shreyas Iyer (Ind) scored his 2nd ODI Century.
- World Cup Super League points: India 10, South Africa 0.

=== 3rd ODI ===
11 October 2022
13:30 (D/N)
Scorecard

| South Africa; 99 (27.1 overs) | v | India; 105/3 (19.1 overs) |
| Heinrich Klaasen 34 (42); Kuldeep Yadav 4/18 (4.1 overs) | | Shubman Gill 49 (57); Bjorn Fortuin 1/20 (4 overs) |

India won by 7 wickets
Arun Jaitley Cricket Stadium, New Delhi
Umpires: Anil Chaudhary (Ind) and Jayaraman Madanagopal (Ind)
Player of the match: Kuldeep Yadav (Ind)

- India won the toss and elected to field.
- David Miller (SA) captained South Africa for the first time in ODIs.
- World Cup Super League points: India 10, South Africa 0.
