= Nail Polish (film) =

2021 Indian film by Bugs Bhargava Krishna

- Release poster
- Directed by: Bugs Bhargava Krishna
- Written by: Bugs Bhargava Krishna
- Produced by: Pradeep Uppoor; Seema Mohaptra; Jahanara Bhagava; Dhirajj Vinodd Kapoor
- Starring: Arjun Rampal; Manav Kaul; Madhoo; Anand Tiwari; Rajit Kapur; Samreen Kaur
- Cinematography: Deep Metkar
- Edited by: Tinni Mitra; Harshad Palsule
- Music by: Sanjay Wandrekar
- Production company: Ten Years Younger Productions
- Distributed by: ZEE5
- Release date: 1 January 2021
- Running time: 128 minutes
- Country: India
- Language: Hindi

Nail Polish is a 2021 Indian Hindi-language legal thriller drama film written and directed by Bugs Bhargava Krishna. Produced by Pradeep Uppoor, Seema Mohaptra, Jahanara Bhagava and Dhirajj Vinodd Kapoor with the production house as Ten Years Younger Production. Starring Arjun Rampal, Manav Kaul, Madhoo, Rajit Kapur, Anand Tiwari and Samreen Kaur. The film follows the trial of a famous social activist who is accused of raping and murdering two migrant children while also suspected of killing others. Nail Polish premiered on ZEE5 on 1 January 2021.

== Plot ==
Celebrated sports coach and former army officer Veer Singh is arrested and charged with the rape and murder of two migrant children. He is also suspected of killing dozens of other children over a period of five years.

Sid Jaisingh, an ambitious and successful defense lawyer, is hired to represent Veer. The case is a stepping stone for Jaisingh's political career, and he is confident he can win despite the overwhelming evidence against his client.

During the trial, and after a prison attack, Veer appears to lose his memory and develops a second personality. He begins acting like a timid, middle-aged Kashmiri woman named Charu Raina, claiming this is his true self. The film's title alludes to this turn, as the new personality requests nail polish.

Jaisingh pivots his defense, arguing that his client has Dissociative Identity Disorder (DID) and that the "Veer Singh" personality is no longer mentally present to be tried. The defense and prosecution battle over the validity of this claim, questioning if the personality shift is a genuine psychological episode or a calculated act.

A psychiatrist testifies that Veer does, in fact, have DID. The court eventually rules that it cannot punish the personality currently controlling Veer's body and declares a mistrial. In the final scene, the "Charu" personality gives a telling look to the camera while playing with a paperweight, implying that the entire performance may have been a carefully planned deception by the manipulative psychopath. The film leaves the ending open to interpretation for the viewer.

== Cast ==
- Arjun Rampal as Siddharth Jaisingh (Sid)
- Manav Kaul as Veer Singh; 'Ranjit'; 'Charu Raina'
- Anand Tiwari as Amit Kumar
- Rajit Kapur as Judge Kishore Bhushan
- Madhoo as Shobha Bhusan
- Samreen Kaur as Charu Raina
- Sameer Dharmadhikari as DCP Sunil Sachdev
- Rushad Rana as Yashpal Sharma
- Neha Hinge as Malthi Kumar
- Pratibha Goregaonkar as Matron
- Mansee Deshmukh as Maya Kawal
- Deepak Chaddha as Dada Shah
- Sukesh Anand as Harpal Phera
- Shiv Kumar Subramaniam as Dr. Nandi

== Reception ==
Anna M. M. Vetticad gave a positive review and said that the film "touches upon aspects of sexual violence rarely discussed in Hindi cinema or in Indian society at large." Shrikanth Venkatesh of Sify wrote, "Nail Polish is a gritty film and is gripping for the most part. The acting is generally top notch, with Arjun Rampal and Manav Kaul especially in fine form. Archika Khurana of The Times of India called it a "a compelling thriller which can be watched for its story and most importantly the outstanding performances."

Shubhra Gupta of The Indian Express praised the film and wrote, "A few things are overstated, a couple of facts are fuzzily presented, but despite the occasional eye-roll, Nail Polish, buoyed by a wonderful performance from Manav Kaul, and ably supported by the rest, keep us engaged." Prathyush Parasuraman of Film Companion wrote, "If nothing else, this movie is a testament to how well-framed and well-acted films can elevate even the banal writing, even if it cannot entirely transcend the banality."

== Soundtrack ==
No.	Title	Singers	Length
1.	"Gustakh Mausam"	Vibha Saraf & Ronit Chaterji	3:13
