= Music Teacher (film) =

2019 Hindi drama film

- Film poster
- Directed by: Sarthak Dasgupta
- Written by: Sarthak Dasgupta; Gaurav Sharma (dialogue)
- Produced by: Sarthak Dasgupta
- Starring: Manav Kaul; Divya Dutta; Neena Gupta
- Cinematography: Kaushik Mandal
- Music by: Original Composition: R.D. Burman; Music Re-created By: Rochak Kohli
- Production companies: Saregama India; Yoodlee Films
- Distributed by: Netflix
- Release date: 19 April 2019
- Running time: 101 minutes
- Country: India
- Language: Hindi

Music Teacher is a 2019 Indian Hindi-language drama film directed and co-written by Sarthak Dasgupta.

== Plot ==
Beni Madhav Singh (Manav Kaul) is a middle aged music teacher who is living and working in a small and quaint hill town named Solan. His family includes his sister Urmi (Niharika Dutt) and his mother (Neena Gupta) who constantly worries about his decision to remain a bachelor and his refusal to work in a regular salaried job. Many evenings, Beni wanders up to the hill side and sings melancholic songs reminiscing about his former pupil Jonai, which his neighbour, Geeta (Divya Dutta), a middle aged married woman living with her father in law, secretly listens to.

Flashbacks reveal that Beni used to provide music lessons to a young girl named Jyotsna "Jonai" Ray (Amrita Bagchi) who is gifted yet not as ambitious and driven as Beni. After winning a local singing competition, Jonai receives offers to work in Mumbai which she is reluctant to accept on account of her budding love for Beni and desire to marry him and remain in Solan. She proposes to Beni but he rejects it, in spite of being in love with her, asking her to move to Mumbai first and focus on her career, an opportunity he always desired for himself; hoping that her move to Mumbai will provide him with contacts that would eventually pave way for his career. A heartbroken Jonai leaves for Mumbai and ultimately becomes an extremely successful, wealthy and renowned singer. Presently, Beni lives in regret about not accepting Jonai's proposal and yearns for her, a hint towards the possible reason for his bachelorhood. He's also increasingly despondent about his languishing career despite several attempts at trying to make it big. Throughout, he appears unsettled and desolate owing to overbearing emotions of regret, jealousy, anger, grief and loneliness which he begins to share with Geeta with whom he has secretly begun a sexual relationship; Geeta is herself afflicted by an emotional turmoil on account of her husband marrying another woman in another town.

The local authorities organise a public music concert of Jonai about which the whole town seems excited. Locals keep asking and reminding Beni about "his pupil" Jonai and the concert, which dismays Beni, who is in the midst of planning his sister's wedding. Visibly emotionally shaken hearing the news of Jonai's upcoming visit to the town, he changes the wedding date to coincide with the concert so as to avoid it altogether although he is desperate to meet her . He expresses his emotional disturbance to Geeta who encourages him to meet Jonai despite harbouring love for Beni, realising that he still, truly loves Jonai. Dejected by this realisation coupled with her father in law's death and husband's refusal to visit the funeral, she leaves town.

Beni leaves the wedding festivities midway and attends the show from backstage. In the green room, initially hesitant and awkward, Beni tearfully admits to how much he still loves her while Jonai laments about the unfortunate course of their relationship. She confesses that she only accepted to perform in the concert so that she could meet him. He proposes to her but she only replies that she can't accept it now even if she so desired. He leaves for home saddened yet seemingly relieved about finding some form of closure. Returning home, his mother, instinctively aware that he has met Jonai, enquires if he's happy to which he replies that he is.

== Cast ==
- Manav Kaul as Beni Madhav Singh
- Divya Dutta as Geeta
- Neena Gupta as Madhavi
- Amrita Bagchi as Jyotsna Ray aka Jonae
- Niharika Lyra Dutt as Urmi
- Jaspal Sharma as barber

== Soundtrack ==
Music Teacher

Soundtrack album by R.D. Burman & Rochak Kohli
- Recorded: 2019
- Label: Saregama
- Producer: Rochak Kohli

The film music was composed by Rochak Kohli . Kohli used two classic scores, composed by legendary music composer R.D. Burman . The songs that Kohli recreated were Phir Wohi Raat from the film Ghar and Rimjhim Gire Sawan from the film Manzil . The original scores were sung by Kishore Kumar and one by Kishore Kumar and Lata Mangeshkar .

No.	Title	Lyrics	Singer(s)	Length
1.	"Rhimjhim Gire Sawan"	Yogesh	Shreya Ghoshal and Papon	4:44
2.	"Phir Wahi Raat"	Gulzar	Papon
3.	"Sambhaal Rakhiyan" (Male version)	Gurpreet Saini	Jubin Nautiyal
4.	"Sambhaal Rakhiyan" (Female version)	Gurpreet Saini	Neeti Mohan
5.	"Ik Mod" (Female version)	Adheesh Verma	Neeti Mohan
6.	"Ik Mod" (Male version)	Adheesh Verma	Papon	4:19
