= Hansa (film) =

- Hansa Poster
- Directed by: Manav Kaul
- Written by: Manav Kaul
- Story by: Manav Kaul
- Produced by: Manav Kaul
- Starring: Trimala Adhikari; Suraj Kabadwal; Kumud Mishra; Ghanshyam Lalsa; Abhay Joshi
- Cinematography: Sachin Singh (credited as Sachin Kabir)
- Edited by: Radhey Lalsa
- Music by: Manish J. Tipu; Brince Bora
- Production company: Aranya Films
- Distributed by: PVR Pictures
- Release date: 28 December 2012
- Running time: 88 minutes
- Country: India
- Language: Hindi

Hansa is a 2012 independent feature film in Hindi written, directed and produced by Manav Kaul. The directorial debut film is set in an unnamed Himalayan village where the protagonists Hansa and his elder sister Cheeku search for their missing father. Upon its release the film received critical acclaim.

It was made at a low cost of 700,00 Indian rupees (approximately USD 12,739, as of 2012, the time of making the film). The film was shot in a village in Uttarakhand, India.

During an interview aired on The Lallantop, an Indian online news channel, director Manav Kaul mentioned that the film is available for free viewing on YouTube.

== Plot summary ==
The movie revolves around a young boy, Hansa, and his sister, Cheeku. Their father has mysteriously disappeared while their mother is pregnant and about to deliver. The father has mortgaged their home against unpaid debts, and now it is left to young Cheeku to save her home. She is at the receiving end of a powerful villager's lecherous advances while young Hansa is too restless and distracted to pay attention to all the trouble his sister is facing. For Hansa his troubles revolve around a small red tennis ball which has got entangled high in a large tree and a five rupee coin stolen from a local bully.

== Cast ==
- Trimala Adhikari as Cheeku
- Suraj Kabadwal as Hansa
- Kumud Mishra as Bajju da
- Abhay Joshi as Lohni
- Bhushan Vikas
- Ashish Pathode
- Ghanshyam Lalsa as Laddu
- Farrukh Seyer as Tikum

== Release and reception ==
The film was released in India by PVR Pictures as part of their "Director's Rare" film package on 28 December 2012.

Hansa has received critical acclaim after its premiere at the 2012 Osian's Cinefan Festival of Asian and Arab Cinema. There, it received two awards, the Best Film Audience Vote and Best Film Critics Award.

Hansa has also been cited by BBC Hindi as one of the must-watch Hindi films of 2012 from India.
