= 12 'O' Clock (film) =

Bollywood horror film

- Theatrical release poster
- Directed by: Ram Gopal Varma
- Produced by: Ram Gopal Varma
- Starring: Mithun Chakraborty; Makarand Deshpande; Flora Saini; Manav Kaul; Krishna Gautam
- Cinematography: Amol Rathod
- Music by: M. M. Kreem
- Production company: Company Production
- Distributed by: UFO Moviez
- Release date: 8 January 2021
- Running time: 135 minutes
- Country: India
- Language: Hindi

12 'O' Clock is a 2021 Indian Hindi-language horror film directed by Ram Gopal Varma and starring Mithun Chakraborty, Flora Saini, Manav Kaul, Krishna Gautam and Makarand Deshpande. The film was first announced with the name Geher, but the following trailer revealed it had been renamed 12 'O' Clock on 3 July 2020. It was released in India on 8 January 2021.

== Plot ==
The film opens with the murder of a pedestrian by an old lady at night which remains unresolved. The plot then moves to Gauri's family, comprising her father Rao, mother, brother and grandmother. Gauri is shown to sleepwalk and act strangely at night time.

Unexplained murders continue to happen in the city. Two policemen also get murdered, leaving the police baffled. Gauri becomes quiet and withdrawn and often experiences hallucinations. She is taken to a doctor who is not able to cure her, then to a tantrik who says she is possessed and tries to exorcise her by beating her to which her parents object.

Rao visits psychiatrist Dr Debashish, who says Gauri has dissociated personality disorder, and can be treated. One doctor who treats Gauri and his assistant nurse are murdered too. Gauri begins to talk in a manly voice and tells her parents that she is the one who committed the murders in the city. Rao sends his son and mother to their village for safety.

Rao then goes to the police, and inspector Francis, at first dismissive of his statement, then goes to visit Gauri himself. Gauri continues to speak in a manly voice and it is revealed that she is possessed by Babu, the spirit of a psycho killer who was killed in an encounter by the police a year back. He possessed Gauri as she passed by a cemetery where he was interred. Francis was the policeman who killed Babu. A shocked Francis goes to his superior commissioner who assigns him leave and rubbishes the claims. Francis later kills his wife and shoots himself, apparently possessed by a spirit.

Debashish is called to visit Gauri but is also shocked when Babu speaks to him in the voice of his dying mother. Commissioner and Debashish meet Babu and are not able to deny the reality now. Babu says he will never leave Gauri's body and will continue to commit murders, with the help of other spirits who committed the other murders in the city on his behalf. The exorcist is approached again and he tells them that there is darkness beyond the light and educated people see only the light, before he too apparently becomes possessed by a spirit and gets killed.

Left with no choice, and the concern that the media will never believe claims of supernatural powers, everyone decides that Gauri must be killed for Babu's spirit to be eliminated before more murders occur. Rao and his wife enter the house, distract Babu and immolate Gauri, with Debashish and commissioner watching.

The film ends with Debashish writing to his daughter, describing this paranormal incident, saying that there is more to what is unexplainable than rational thinking and the supernatural does exist.

== Cast ==
- Mithun Chakraborty as Debu
- Krishna Gautam as Gauri
- Flora Saini as Maya D'Souza, D'Souza's wife
- Manav Kaul as Encounter Specialist Francis D'Souza
- Makarand Deshpande as Rao
- Divya Jagdale as Gauri's mother
- Ashish Vidyarthi as Baba
- Ali Asgar as Doctor
- Jasbir Thandi as Clerk
- Dalip Tahil as Commissioner

== Production ==
As Mithun Chakraborty visited Ram Gopal Varma to wish him on his birthday, rumours surfaced that RGV is making a film with Chakraborty in the lead, but RGV rubbished the rumours saying he is making a film with Abhishek Bachchan after Sarkar 3, but weeks later he announced the project with Chakraborty, a horror film starring Flora Saini, Manav Kaul and Makarand Deshpande as well. Actor Amit Sadh was also in consideration for a role. The principal photography of the film started in mid-April 2019. Actors Ashish Vidyarthi and Ali Asgar joined the project later.

== Reception ==
Archika Khurana of The Times of India gave the film, a rating of 2 out of 5 and stated "If you get spooked easily, you may not mind this one. However, as a psychological thriller that's focussed on 'one's believes in supernatural activities only when they have faced themselves', '12 'o' Clock' fails to hold your attention for too long and ends up being a bit of a drag."
