= Dhiraj Vinod Kapoor =

Indian film actor

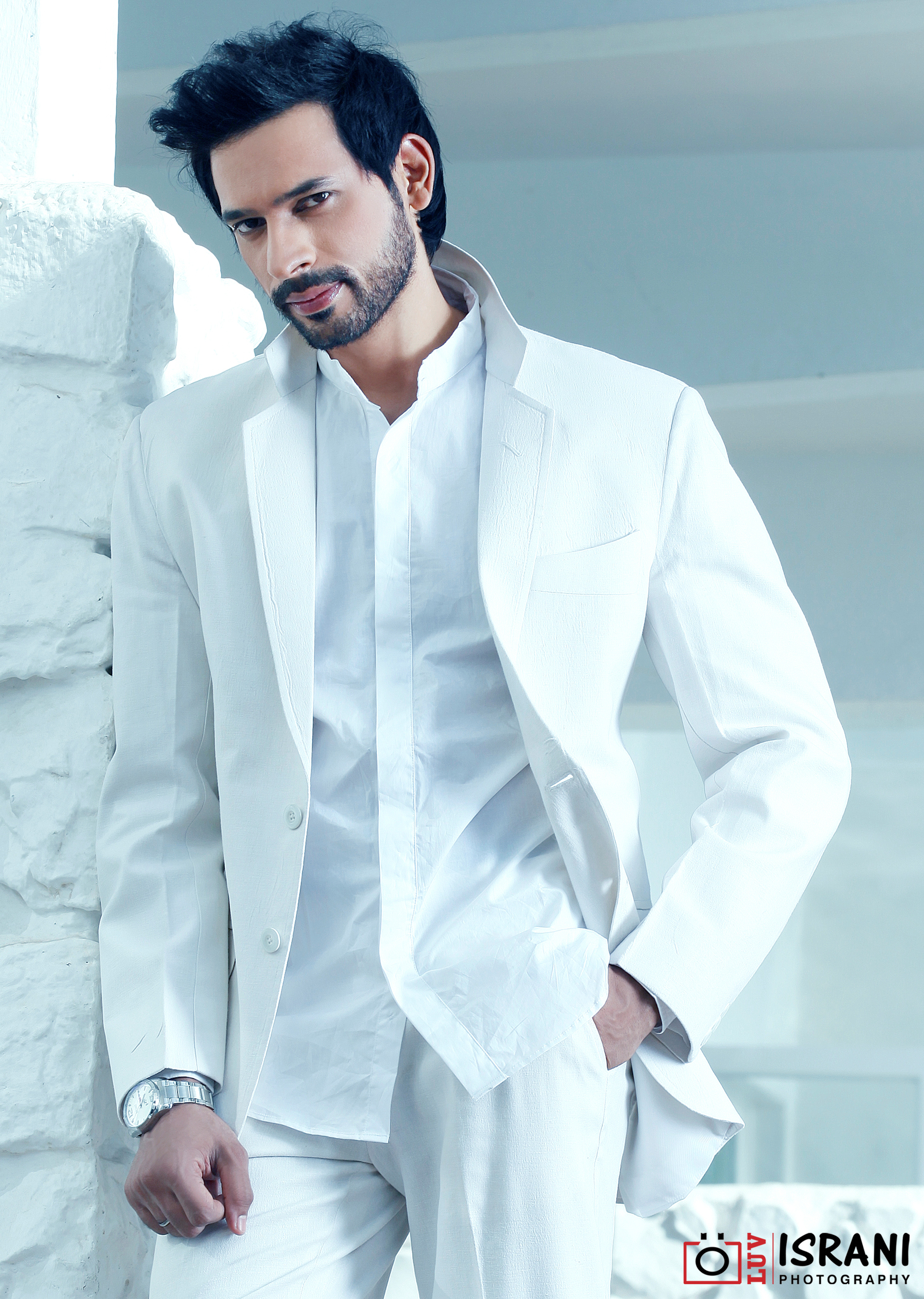
- Kapoor's Fashion Photoshoot
- Born: 25 October 1978 (age 47); Bangalore, Karnataka, India
- Citizenship: India
- Occupations: Actor, Model, Director, Board Advisor, Consultant, Producer, Brand Marketing, Entrepreneur, Founder of Limelight Biz, Founder & Managing Director of Dhiraj Walks of Art Private Limited, Founder of The 8888 Consultaancy
- Years active: 2000–present
- Parent(s): Viney Rani Kapoor & Vinod Kumar Kapoor
- Website: dhirajkapoor.com

Dhiraj Vinod Kapoor (earlier known as Dheeraj Kapoor Alias Dheiraj Kapoor, Dhirajj Vinodd Kapoor) is an Indian actor, model, director, board advisor, consultant, producer and entrepreneur. Kapoor is known for his modeling assignments with Honda Activa TVC, Byford T-shirts Campaign, Gurukul Campaign, BPL net.com Campaign, and IBM computers Campaigns.

== Early life ==
Dhiraj Vinod Kapoor was born in Bangalore, India, on 25 October 1978; His mother Viney Rani Kapoor was a housewife and his father, Vinod Kumar Kapoor was a businessman, based out of Bangalore.

== Career ==
Dhiraj Vinod Kapoor started his career with modeling assignments with Honda Activa TVC, Byford T-shirts Campaign, Gurukul Campaign, BPL net.com Campaign, and IBM computers Campaigns. Kapoor has acted in four English plays with Mahesh Dattani and also acted in a Hindi play while doing his summer course in National School of Drama.

In his early 20s Dhiraj moved away from his family retail business and started Limelight in the millennium year with his close friend. In 2005, to expand further, he moved to Mumbai, establishing himself nationally and internationally as a producer. Moving back into India from Los Angeles with the conviction to do differentiated assignments for varied ventures in different industries such as Cinema, Arts, Culture, Entertainment & Information Technology, he has taken his entrepreneurial skills with the launch of his new company Dhiraj Walks of Art Pvt Ltd.

== Philanthropy ==
Currently, he serves as a Board Advisor for the "HOPE B~Lit Foundation" for their "A Voices Unheard Films" social awareness shorts and features.

== Filmography ==
| Year | Title | Role | Actor | Producer | Notes |
|---|---|---|---|---|---|
| 2000 | The Murder That Never Was | Lead | Yes | | Theatrical play |
| 2003 | Murder He Wrote | Main Lead/ Prithvi | Yes | Yes | Short film |
| 2004 | Who Stole the Cookie Jar | Lead | Yes | | Theatrical play |
| 2015 | Diary of The Actor | Main Lead | Yes | | Short film (shooting completed) |
| 2017 | Zindagi Chalte Rahe | Main Lead/ Vedant | Yes | | Short film |
| 2017 | Look out into the world with a clean slate. | Main Lead | Yes | Yes | Short film |
| 2019 | The Last Koan | Associate Producer | | Yes | Feature film |
| 2019 | Got Cancer | Associate Producer | | Yes | A docu-fiction film |
| 2019 | Barot House | Producer | | Yes | Zee5 film |
| 2019 | Posham Pa | Producer | | Yes | Zee5 film |
| 2020 | Got Cancer Survivor's Journey | Associate Producer | | Yes | Documentary film-Completed |
| 2021 | Nail Polish | Producer | | Yes | Zee5 originals film |
| 2022 | Anona | Main Lead/ Producer | Yes | Yes | Feature film - post production |
