= Arshdeep Singh =

Indian cricketer (born 1999)

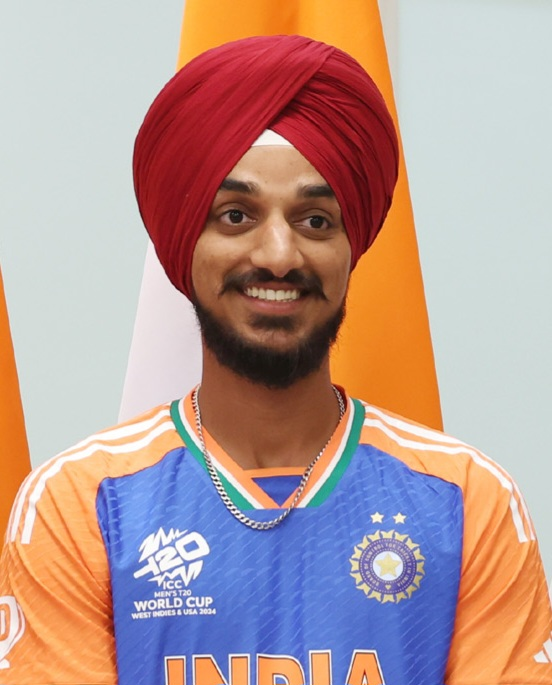
- Arshdeep in 2024

Personal information
- Born: 5 February 1999 (age 27); Guna, Madhya Pradesh, India
- Height: 1.91 m (6 ft 3 in)
- Batting: Left-handed
- Bowling: Left-arm medium-fast
- Role: Bowler
- Relatives: Samreen Kaur (eng. 2026)

International information
- National side: India (2022–present)
- ODI debut (cap 248): 25 November 2022 v New Zealand
- Last ODI: 10 November 2026 v New Zealand
- ODI shirt no.: 2
- T20I debut (cap 99): 7 July 2022 v England
- Last T20I: 1 November 2026 v New Zealand
- T20I shirt no.: 2

Domestic team information
- Years: Team
- 2018/19–present: Punjab
- 2019–2026: Punjab Kings

Career statistics
Competition	ODI	T20I	LA	T20
Matches	21	104	51	228
Runs scored	74	120	159	193
Batting average	8.22	6.31	10.60	7.42
100s/50s	0/0	0/0	0/0	0/0
Top score	18	12	49	23*
Balls bowled	927	2,167	2,398	4,802
Wickets	34	151	87	294
Bowling average	24.73	20.74	24.02	23.81
5 wickets in innings	1	1	3	2
10 wickets in match	0	0	0	0
Best bowling	5/37	5/51	5/34	5/32
Catches/stumpings	5/–	23/–	12/–	51/–
Medal record
Men's cricket
Representing India
ICC T20 World Cup
Winner	2024 West Indies & USA
Winner	2026 India & Sri Lanka
ICC Champions Trophy
Winner	2025 Pakistan
ACC Asia Cup
Winner	2025 UAE
Asian Games
Gold medal – first place	2022 Hanghzou
Gold medal – first place	2026 Aichi–Nagoya
ICC U19 World Cup
Winner	2018 New Zealand
- Source: Cricinfo, 11 November 2026

Arshdeep Singh (born 5 February 1999) is an Indian cricketer who plays for the Indian national team as a left-arm medium-fast bowler. He represents Punjab in domestic cricket and Mumbai Indians in the Indian Premier League. Arshdeep was an integral member of the Indian team that won the 2024 and 2026 T20 World Cups, and was the joint-highest wicket taker in the former. He was also a member of the 2025 Champions Trophy, 2025 Asia Cup and 2018 U19 World Cup winning squads.

Arshdeep made his international debut for the Indian team in July 2022 in a T20I match against England. He bowled a maiden over on debut, becoming just the third Indian bowler to do so on their T20I debut. (Note: The others were Jhulan Goswami, the former captain of the Indian women's team, and Ajit Agarkar who played for India's men's team between 1998 and 2007.) He is also the first Indian bowler to take 100 wickets in T20Is.

== Early life ==
Arshdeep was born on 5 February 1999 in Guna in the state of Madhya Pradesh, India. He completed his schooling at Gyan Jyoti Public School, Kharar and later studied at the Chandigarh University.

== Domestic career ==
In junior cricket, Arshdeep played in the Katoch Shield tournament. He was part of the Indian U19 team which won 2018 U19 World Cup and went on to play for the Uional team.

In 2018, he played for Punjab's U23 team in the CK Nayudu Trophy. Playing against Rajasthan U23s, he took eight wickets, including a hat-trick, in Rajasthan's second innings and 10 wickets in the match. Arshdeep went on to make his List A debut for Punjab in the 2018–19 Vijay Hazare Trophy on 19 September 2018 and in January 2019 made his first-class debut against Vidarbha in the 2019–20 Ranji Trophy.

In December 2018, he was bought by Kings XI Punjab (Note: Kings XI Punjab are now known as Punjab Kings.) in the player auction for the 2019 Indian Premier League. He made his Twenty20 debut for the team on 16 April 2019. He finished as the team's second-highest wicket-taker during the season and was highlighted as a future star player.

In November 2019, Arshdeep was named in India's squad for the 2019 ACC Emerging Teams Asia Cup in Bangladesh.

Arshdeep received accolades for his yorkers and death-overs bowling in 2022 IPL, finishing the season with an economy rate of 7.7.

In March 2023, Arshdeep agreed to play up to five County Championship matches for Kent County Cricket Club during the 2023 English cricket season.

In an IPL 2023 match against Mumbai Indians at Wankhede Stadium, Arshdeep bowled two successive swinging yorkers that broke the stumps. The rarity of such an occurrence along with the associated equipment costs received considerable coverage in the Media.

In the 2023–24 Syed Mushtaq Ali Trophy Final between Punjab and Baroda, Baroda needed 32 runs from the final two overs with seven wickets in hand, having scored 24 runs in the 18th over. Arshdeep Singh took three wickets in five balls in the 19th over and conceded only four runs to help Punjab secure the victory.

Arshdeep was one of the top buys and the highest paid pace bowler at the Indian Premier League 2025 auction, sold for ₹18 crore after Punjab Kings used the Right to Match (RTM) card. Punjab Kings head coach Ricky Ponting said that Arshdeep was one of three Indian players, along with Yuzvendra Chahal and Shreyas Iyer, who were considered “non-negotiables” ahead of the IPL 2025 mega auction.

In April 2025, Punjab Kings defended 111—the lowest total ever defended in IPL history—against KKR. At one point, KKR needed 17 runs from 33 balls with two wickets in hand, with Andre Russell still at the crease. Arshdeep bowled a wicket maiden over to Vaibhav Arora to bring Punjab to the verge of victory. Coach Ricky Ponting, who has been coaching IPL teams since 2014, later described the win as “just about the best win I’ve ever had” in the IPL. Arshdeep finished the season as the leading wicket-taker for Punjab Kings and is now the highest wicket taker in Punjab Kings' IPL history. He was subsequently retained by the team for the 2026 IPL season.

== International career ==
In June 2021, Arshdeep was named as one of five net bowlers for India's tour of Sri Lanka. Following a positive case of COVID-19 in the Indian team, he was added to India's main squad for their final two Twenty20 International (T20I) matches of the tour.

In May 2022, he was named in India's T20I squad for their series against South Africa and following month was named in the T20I squad for India's two-match series against Ireland.

In June 2022, Arshdeep was named in India's One Day International (ODI) and T20I squads for their tour of England. In July 2022, he was again named in India's ODI squad, this time for their away series against the West Indies. He made his T20I debut on 7 July 2022, playing against England at Southampton, taking the final two England wickets and bowling a rare maiden over on debut.

He took seven wickets and was Player of the Series in five T20I matches played against West Indies in 2022, and on 8 August 2022 was named in India's squad for the 2022 Asia Cup. In September 2022, he was named in India's squad for the series against South Africa, going on to take five wickets in two T20Is. In a Player of the Match performance during the first T20I against South Africa, Arshdeep took three wickets in his first over, including the wicket of David Miller, whom he clean bowled first ball with a sharp, late inswinger.

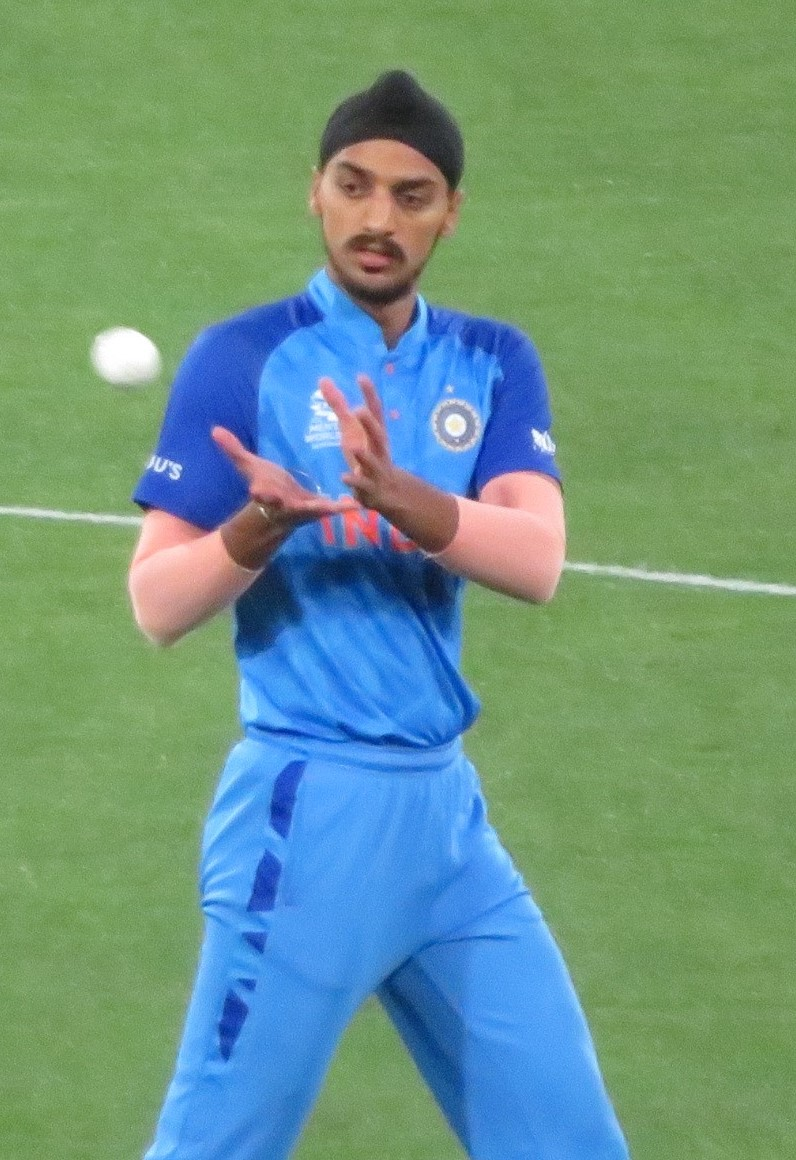
Arshdeep playing for India during the 2022 ICC T20 World Cup

In September, Arshdeep was named in India's squad for the 2022 ICC T20 World Cup, In the team's opening match against Pakistan he took a wicket with his first ball, taking 3/32 in his 4 overs. He was India's leading wicket-taker in the tournament with 10 wickets in six matches with a bowling average of 15.60 runs per wicket.

In November 2022, Arshdeep made his One Day International (ODI) debut against New Zealand at Auckland. He played in all three of the ODIs during the tour but did not take a wicket, (Note: Two of the ODIs were abandoned due to rain, with India unable to bowl in one of them.) although he did take four wickets in the two T20I matches.

In December 2023, in the fifth T20I against Australia in Bengaluru, Arshdeep was tasked with defending 9 runs in the final over, with Australia's captain, a well-set Matthew Wade, at the crease. Arshdeep conceded only 3 runs in that over and dismissed Wade, enabling India to clinch the series 4–1. He received praise for remaining calm and composed in a tense finish and showcasing his skills as a death-overs bowler. Arshdeep was subsequently instrumental in India winning the ODI series in their tour of South Africa in December 2023. He picked up 10 wickets in 3 matches and was declared Player of the Series.

In May 2024, he was named in India's squad for the 2024 ICC Men's T20 World Cup. He won the 'Player of the Match Award' against United States after taking four wickets and conceding just nine runs in four overs. He also became the first Indian bowler to pick up a wicket with the very first ball of a T20 World Cup game. He took 17 wickets in the tournament, a joint record for most wickets in a single edition of the ICC Men's T20 World Cup. Arshdeep received praise from Wisden for his bowling under pressure in the final against South Africa, which India won. The ICC named him the Men's T20I Cricketer of the Year for 2024, making him the first bowler to ever receive this award. The citation reads: "Brilliance in the powerplay, a wicket in the middle overs, and economical excellence at the death – Arshdeep stepped up when it mattered most." He was subsequently named in the ICC Men's T20I Team of the Year for 2024, as well.

In January 2025, Arshdeep became the leading wicket-taker for India in T20Is during the series against England. In September 2025, Arshdeep became the first Indian bowler to take 100 wickets in T20 internationals. He reached this milestone in his 64th T20 game, making him the fastest pace bowler to achieve that feat. In a tied Asia Cup match against Sri Lanka in September 2025, Arshdeep bowled the Super Over, taking two wickets while conceding just two runs to secure victory for India. Captain Suryakumar Yadav later stated that Arshdeep was his only choice for the Super Over, given how well he performs in pressure situations for India and his IPL Franchise.

Arshdeep was named Player of the Match in one of the two games India won during their 2–1 T20I series victory over Australia in Australia in November 2025. He also delivered a Player of the Match performance in one of India's three wins during their 3–1 T20I series victory over South Africa in India in December 2025.

On 31 January 2026, Arshdeep scalped his maiden five-wicket haul in T20Is during the fifth T20I against New Zealand. Although his spell of 5/51 in four overs became the most expensive five-wicket haul in T20I history, it was instrumental in India winning the match and clinching the T20I series 4–1. Arshdeep was the highest wicket taker for India in that T20I series, as well.

Arshdeep was part of India's T20 World Cup winning squad in 2026, as well. India scripted history by winning back-to-back titles and becoming the first team to claim three ICC Men's T20 World Cup titles. In a must-win, virtual quarter-final against the West Indies at Eden Gardens in Kolkata, Arshdeep conceded only six runs in the 19th over when the West Indies had two well-set, power hitters in Jason Holder and Rovman Powell at the crease. Ravichandran Ashwin felt that it was Arshdeep's execution in that over that broke the momentum of the West Indian innings; otherwise, India could have been chasing a target of 210–220. In a high-scoring semi-final match at Wankhede Stadium in Mumbai, Arshdeep was able to pick up the vital wicket of Will Jacks to end his 77-run partnership with Jacob Bethell as England were closing in on India's total of 253. When India were defending 255 in the World Cup final at the Narendra Modi Stadium in Ahmedabad, Arshdeep bowled his quota of four overs economically giving away only 32 runs but didn't take any wickets. Finn Allen, who had scored a 33-ball hundred against South Africa in the previous game, was dropped on zero off Arshdeep's bowling in the very first over of the New Zealand run chase.

Former England cricketer Mark Butcher reflecting on India's World Cup triumph, said: “Arshdeep was incredibly skilful with the new ball. I think he was the only bloke in the tournament who was able to swing it both ways.” Arshdeep is now only behind Jasprit Bumrah on the list of India's leading wicket-takers in ICC T20 World Cups.

As of 24 October 2026, Arshdeep Singh has taken 38 T20I wickets in the 2026 calendar year, setting a new record for the most T20I wickets by an Indian men's cricketer in a single calendar year, beating Bhuvneshwar Kumar's record of 37 wickets in 2022.

== Playing style ==
Arshdeep has received praise from former India cricketers Sunil Gavaskar and Sachin Tendulkar. Tendulkar commended Arshdeep for being balanced, committed, and having the right mindset for T20 cricket. He stated, "What I really like is that if Arshdeep has a plan, he commits to it and that is really, really important in this format as batters are going out and playing those extra shots and some innovative ones. So if you have a plan, commit to it."

Gavaskar praised Arshdeep's ability to swing the ball and his temperament, comparing him to Jasprit Bumrah, and said, "I do believe that he, like Bumrah, can be a very, very good bowler in red-ball cricket as well. Because if he can move the white ball so well, just imagine what he can do with the red ball. So I think the selection committee would do very well to look at him as an option for the red-ball game as well."

Arshdeep has earned recognition from fellow fast bowlers, including Kagiso Rabada, Lockie Ferguson, and Marco Jansen, as well. Rabada described him as the best death bowler in the IPL when they played together in 2022. Ferguson said, “I'm in awe of Arshdeep, really. He's an exceptional bowler... he absolutely loves fast bowling. He loves bowling at the death. He loves bowling with a new ball. He's hungry for the ball.” Jansen, who has also been Arshdeep's new-ball partner at Punjab Kings, remarked, “I really enjoyed working with him. I didn't expect him to be so open about sharing local knowledge—how wickets behave, what the ball does—but his inputs were very, very helpful.”

Arshdeep has credited yoga and meditation with helping him stay calm and maintain mental clarity in high-pressure situations. He has expressed appreciation for all the guidance and support he has received from captain Rohit Sharma, former coach Rahul Dravid, and fellow fast bowler Jasprit Bumrah. He has spoken very favourably about his early coaching under Jaswant Rai, as well as his association with former Punjab Kings bowling coach Damien Wright.

He has also spoken about Morné Morkel helping him in his quest to become a more aware, proactive, and adaptable fast bowler in T20 cricket.
