= A Scandall =

- Release poster
- Directed by: Ishan Shrivedi
- Starring: Reeth Mazumder; Manav Kaul; Johnny Baweja; Puru Chibber; Vasundhara Kaul; Tanvi Vyas
- Music by: Bapi-Tutul; Ikka Arko; Amjad Nadeem
- Production company: Let’s Ring The Bell Productions
- Release date: 24 June 2016
- Running time: 111 minutes
- Country: India
- Language: Hindi

A Scandall is a 2016 Indian Hindi-language erotic murder mystery film directed by Ishan Shrivedi and starring Reeth Mazumder, Manav Kaul, Johnny Baweja, Puru Chibber, Vasundhara Kaul and Tanvi Vyas.

== Plot ==
A group of friends wants to make a film when an issue arises.

== Cast ==
- Reeth Mazumder as Koya
- Manav Kaul as Manav
- Johnny Baweja as Vidhu
- Puru Chibber as Prabal
- Vasundhara Kaul as Asmi
- Tanvi Vyas as Anshu
- Sareh

== Production ==
Johnny Baweja, cousin of Harman Baweja made his debut with this film. This film marks the feature film debut of Sareh, who acted in a few television shows. The film was given an A certificate with some scenes edited out and some audio muted.

== Soundtrack ==
The music for the film is composed by Ikka, Arko, Amjad Nadeem.

Track listing
No.	Title	Lyrics	Music	Singer(s)	Length
1.	"Long Night"	Intense	Ikka Singh, Arko	Shivangi Bhayana, Ikka Singh	4:01
2.	"Labon Se"	Sameer Anjaan	Amjad Nadeem	Jubin Nautiyal, Sukriti Kakar	3:55
3.	"Labon Se 2.0"	Sameer Anjaan	Amjad Nadeem	Jubin Nautiyal, Shivranjani Singh	3:55
Total length:					11:03

== Release and reception ==
The film was not screened in multi-screen theatres and only survived off of word of mouth.

A critic from The Times of India rated the film 1 1/2 out of 5 stars and wrote that "The forced love triangle replete with inconsequential kissing scenes and steamy songs is unnecessary. The film tries to bite off more than it can chew". A critic from IANS wrote that "the film is amateurishly handled and although a mish-mash of genres it definitely tilts towards sleaze". A critic from Cinestaan wrote that "On the whole, A Scandall scandalizes you with the complete absence of logic".
