= Tolerance Oval =

Cricket ground

- Nursery 1
- Interactive map of Tolerance Oval

Ground information
- Location: Abu Dhabi, United Arab Emirates
- Coordinates: 24°23′47″N 54°32′26″E
- Establishment: 2018

International information
- Only Test: 28 February – 1 March 2024: Afghanistan v Ireland
- First T20I: 20 October 2019: Canada v Jersey
- Last T20I: 27 October 2019: Hong Kong v Nigeria
- First WT20I: 18 September 2022: Papua New Guinea v Zimbabwe
- Last WT20I: 3 May 2024: Sri Lanka v United States
- As of 3 May 2024; Source: Cricinfo

The Tolerance Oval is an international cricket ground in Abu Dhabi, United Arab Emirates. It is located next to the Sheikh Zayed Cricket Stadium.

== History ==
It was one of the venues used for the 2019 ICC Men's T20 World Cup Qualifier. In July 2021, the ground was awaiting accreditation by the International Cricket Council (ICC) to be used as one of the venues for the 2021 ICC Men's T20 World Cup.

In February 2024, Ireland cricket team was scheduled to play a Test match at the neighbouring Sheikh Zayed Cricket Stadium against Afghanistan. However, a week before the Test, the match was moved to this venue, making it the 122nd Test cricket venue in the world. Ireland's Mark Adair claimed the maiden Test five wicket haul to be taken at the ground.
