= Rangbhoomi Spaces =

Performing space in Hyderabad, India

- Formation: 2020
- Founder: Jay Jha; Shailja Chaturvedi; Prashant Singh Jadon; Sanjeev Acharya
- Type: Theatre group
- Location: Hyderabad
- Website: rangbhoomispaces.com

Rangbhoomi Spaces is a theatre located in Hyderabad. It is a versatile venue used for theatre, live performances, events, workshops, seminars, poetry, dance, and music. It was inaugurated on 20 December 2020.

The establishment of Rangbhoomi Spaces has been a two-year dream for Jay Jha, who is also founder of the KissaGo Theatre Group, along with Prashant Singh Jadon, Sanjeev Acharya, and Preksha Trivedi. The theatre group Storyboard Productions and Surabhi Santosh provide technical support for sound and lighting.

Rangbhoomi Spaces features an indoor, air-cooled, and sound-proof auditorium with proscenium-style seating and advanced LED lighting. The venue is attached to a cafeteria that offers snacks like samosas, chai, and nimbu paani. A concealed console hub ensures that technicians do not distract the audience.

They have produced various original plays as well as adaptations in Telugu, Hindi, Marathi, Kannada, and English, including plays by Manav Kaul, namely Chuhal, Natak Baste Aahe, and Prekshakani Kshama Karavi.

== Sainikpuri Chapter of Rangbhoomi Spaces ==
Along with the Rangbhoomi Spaces in Gachibowli, they opened a second branch in Sainikpuri. Supported and co-founded by artist Sneha Lata Prasad and theatre actor/director Jay Jha and Preksha Trivedi, the Sanikpuri branch of the Rangbhoomi Spaces was inaugurated on Valentine's Day, 2024 with the play Banerjee Babu.

== Productions ==
YEAR	NAME	LANGUAGE	WRITER	DIRECTOR	
2020	Ismat Ek Aurat	Hindi	Sutradhar	Vinay Verma	Presented by Sutradhar
2023	Chuhal	Telugu	Manav Kaul	Pallavi Verma	Presented by Hyderabad-based ensemble Kriti Stories and Kissago Theatre.
2023	Natak Baste Ahe	Marathi	VV Shriwadkar	Suhas Barve	Soham Theatre's homage to Marathi theatre
2023	Prekshakani Kshama Karavi	Marathi	Vasant Sabnis	Suhas Barve	Soham Theatre's homage to Marathi theatre
2023	The Seagull	English	Anton Chekhov	Jay Jha	Presented by KissaGo Theatre.
2022	The Pillowman	English	Martin McDonagh	Sandeep tadi	Presented by Preksha Theatre Company and Storyboard Productions
2023	Gudilo Panchyati	Telugu	P.L Deshpande	Jay Jha	Presented by KissaGo Theatre
2021	New Bombay Tailors	Telugu		Shaikh John Basheer	Presented by BStudios
2020	Udhaar Ka Pati	Hindi	Vanmala Bhawalkar	Jay Jha	Presented by Preksha Theatre Company and Kissago Theatre
2023	Kaun Salim Kiski Anarkali	Hindi	Hassan Zaidi	Faraz Khan	Presented by Blackbox Productions
2023	Manam Theatre Festival	Multiple Languages	Multiple	Multiple	Presented by Popsicle Productions
2022	Shakkar Ke Paanch Daane	Hindi	Manav Kaul	Jay Jha	Presented by Kissago Theatre
2023	Birdsong	Telugu	Ranjani Sivakumar	Ranjani Sivakumar	Presented by Ranjani Sivakumar
2023	First Crack	Telugu/English	Tanikella Bharani	Sandeep tadi	Presented by Preksha Theatre Company
2024	Jaal	Hindi	Annie Zaiddi	Jay Jha	Presented by Preksha Theatre Company
2024	The Open Couple	English	Dario Fo's	Faraz	Presented by La Compagnie Dramatique
2024	Salma Deewani	Deccani	Bhagyashree Tarke	Bhagyashree Tarke	Presented by Rangbhoomi Spaces
