= Manav Kaul =

Indian theatre director and actor

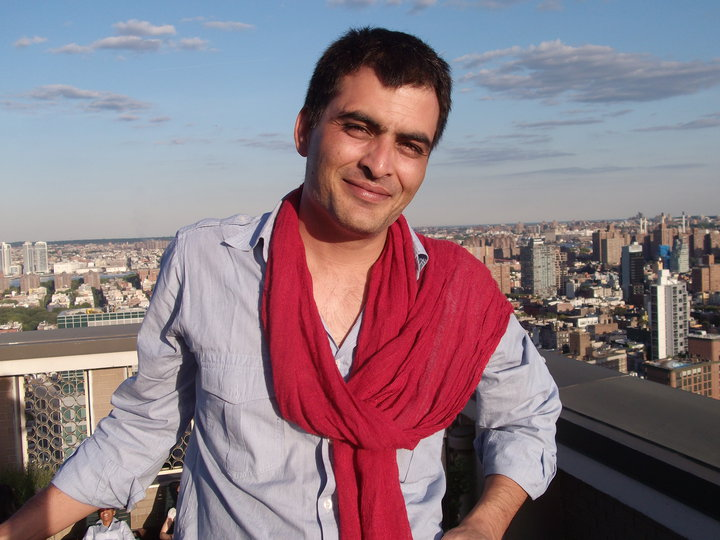
- Kaul in 2010
- Born: 19 December 1976 (age 49); Baramulla, Jammu and Kashmir, India
- Occupations: Theatre director; Playwright; Author; Actor; Filmmaker; Writer; Swimmer
- Years active: 1993–present
- Notable work: Shakkar ke paanch daane (Five grains of sugar); Nail polish; Tumhari Sulu; Ilham (Enlightenment); Park
- Awards: Mahindra Excellence in Theatre Award (META) for Best Script, 2006; Filmfare Short Film Awards 2023 -- Best Actor (Male)

Manav Kaul (born 19 December 1976) is an Indian theatre director, playwright, author, actor and filmmaker. He won the Filmfare OTT Award 2023 for Best Actor for the short film Phir Kabhi apart from being nominated for the same award in 2024 (Tribhuvan Mishra CA Topper) and 2021 (Ajeeb Daastaans). He was also nominated for the Filmfare Award for Best Supporting Actor for his role in the films Tumhari Sulu (2017) and Saina (2021).

== Early life ==
Kaul was born on 19 December 1976 in Baramulla, Jammu and Kashmir, India, into a Kashmiri Pandit family. He studied till the 4th standard in Baramulla, before his family moved to Bhopal, Madhya Pradesh.

He was a competitive swimmer in his late teenage years and participated in state and national levels championships. He won 14 national medals in swimming.

== Career ==
=== Theatre ===
Kaul started a theatre group named Aranya in 2004. He was influenced by Charles Bukowski, Vinod Kumar Shukla, and Nirmal Verma, to whom he paid homage in his 2010 play Red Sparrow.

He has written and directed 13 plays. Among his notable plays are Ilhaam, Park and Shakkar Ke Paanch Daane (transl. Five grains of sugar), the last one being his first work as playwright and director.

In 2004, Kaul staged Shakkar Ke Paanch Daane, a dramatic monologue in Hindi about a small-towner whose "structured middle-India existence begins to feel suspiciously like a lie." It featured actor Kumud Mishra, who was to become his longtime collaborator. The Mumbai Theatre Guide wrote, "the final poetic denouement is neat, funny, reflective but unfortunately all too expected, all too perfect." The play was a stage hit and was performed in English in 2009, from a translation by Arshia Sattar.

In his next play, Peele Scooter Wala Aadmi Kaul explored a father-son relationship in an open-ended narrative, and adopted a style of poetic dialogue similar to that employed by Vinod Kumar Shukla and Nirmal Verma. It won him a Mahindra Excellence in Theatre Award (META) for Best Script in 2006.

In 2006, moving away from internal monologues, Kaul staged a bitter-sweet meditation on old age called Bali aur Shambhu, featuring Sudhir Pandey and Mishra. The Times of India found it "not as philosophical as Shakkar Ke Paanch Daane, yet, it's a story that tugs at your heartstrings and has its moments," while the Mumbai Theatre Guide described it as "one of those plays that appeal to the senses but not to the intellect." Said Kaul, "I wrote the play after I visited an old-age home. I wanted to show that people in old-age homes also have fun."

In 2009, Kaul directed Ranga Shankara's Hindi adaptation of Jean-Paul Sartre's Huis Clos, with The Hindu describing his "treatment of non-verbal, physical expression" as impressive.

Set in 1994, Chuhal, written by Kaul talks about in love, relationships and marriages set in pre-technology times, and has toured in Zee Theater in Mumbai and Delhi, by Theatrenama in Bangalore, and more than one in Hyderabad, once at Ravindra Bharathi and another time at Rangbhoomi Spaces by KissaGo Theatre Group.

=== Cinema ===
In 2012, Kaul debuted as a film director with Hansa for which he also wrote the screenplay. He made his acting debut in Hindi cinema with fantasy film Jajantaram Mamantaram in 2003, and has been lauded for his performance as a right-wing politician in the Gujarat-based Hindi drama Kai Po Che! in 2013.

=== Writing ===
Kaul is a writer who writes on themes of isolation, nostalgia, rootlessness and existentialism etc. Some of his notable books include Chalta Phirta Pret, Antima, Bahut Door Kitna Door Hota hai, Theek Tumhare Peeche. Kaul's recently published novel Rooh explores his journey back to his lost motherland, Kashmir.

== Filmography ==
All films and shows in Hindi unless otherwise stated.

Key
†	Denotes films that have not yet been released

=== Film actor ===
Year	Title	Role	Notes
2003	Jajantaram Mamantaram	Jeran	Debut film
2004	Saatchya Aat Gharat	Venky	Marathi film
2006	Continuum	Security guard	Short film
2007	1971	Flight Lt. Ram	
2010	Daayen Ya Baayen	Sundar	
2010	I Am	Manav	Anthology film. Segment – Afia
2013	Kai Po Che!	Bishakh "Bittu" Joshi	
2014	CityLights	Vishnu	Nominated - Screen Award for Best Actor in a Negative Role (Male), 2015
2016	Wazir	Yazaad Qureshi	Nominated -Zee Cine Awards, Best Actor in a Negative Role, 2017
2016	Jai Gangaajal	MLA Babloo Pandey	
2016	Maroon	Saurabh Sharma	
2016	A Scandall	Manav	
2017	Jolly LLB 2	Iqbal Qasim	
2017	Tumhari Sulu	Ashok Dubey	Nominated – Filmfare Award for Best Supporting Actor, 2017
2018	Dobaara	Mohan	Short film by Bejoy Nambiar
2018	Kashmir	Unnamed	Short film by Terribly Tiny Tales
2019	Music Teacher	Beni Madhav Singh	Netflix film
2019	Albert Pinto Ko Gussa Kyun Aata Hai?	Albert Pinto	
2019	Badla	Jimmy Punjabi	
2020	Thappad	Rohit Jaisingh	
2021	Nail Polish	Veer Singh, ‘Ranjit’, ‘Charu Raina’	Zee5 film
2021	12 'O' Clock	Francis D'Souza	
2021	Madam Chief Minister	Danish Khan	
2021	Saina	Coach Sarvadhaman Rajan	Nominated – Filmfare Award for Best Supporting Actor, 2022
2021	Ajeeb Daastaans	Kabir	Netflix anthology film. Segment - Ankahi. Nominated - Filmfare OTT Awards, Best Actor: Web Original Film, 2021
2021	Dybbuk	Markus	Amazon Prime Video film
2022	Jalsa	Anand	Amazon Prime Video film
2022	Phir Kabhi	Husband	Short film by Nihit Bhave
2023	Chaar Chappalein	Rajat	Short film
2023	Trial Period	Prajapati Dwivedi, "PD"	JioCinema film
2025	Baramulla	DSP Ridwaan Sayyed	Netflix film

=== Film director ===
Year	Title	Notes
2012	Hansa	Film directorial debut
2021	Tathagat	Streaming on MUBI India

== Television ==
Year	Serial	Role	Channel	Notes	Ref
	Banegi Apni Baat		Zee TV		
1998, 1999	Mujhe Chaand Chahiye	Mohan	Zee TV		
1998	X Zone	Ajit	Zee TV	Episode 81	
2000	CID	Neeraj	Sony TV	Season 1, Episode 115, 116 (The Case of the Missing Man: Part 1 and 2)	
2000	CID	Vikrant's brother	Sony TV	Season 1, Episode 141 (The Case Of Silent Witness: Part 1)	
2000–2001	Sukanya		B4U		
2001	Aahat	Jeetu	Sony TV	Season 1, Episode 284 and 285 (Nightmare Disco)	
Bhabhi	Rakesh Chopra	Episode 440			
2003	CID	Kantora	Sony TV	Season 3, Episode 253, 254 (The Case Of The Tempting Diamond: Part 1 and 2)	
2005	CID Special Bureau	Yashwant	Sony TV	Episode 7, 8 (Poisonous Panther)	
2005	Raat Hone Ko Hai	Siddharth Pratap Singh	Sahara One	Story 45: Episode 177 - 180 (Shaadi)	
2006	CID	Suraj	Sony TV	Season 5, Episode 416 (Red Rose Killer)	

=== Web series ===
Year	Title	Role	Service	Notes	Ref
2017	A.I.SHA: My Virtual Girlfriend	Prof Kishore Saraswat	Arré	Season 2	
2018	Ghoul	Colonel Sunil Dacunha	Netflix	Mini series	
2019	The Verdict - State vs Nanavati	Kawas Nanavati	ZEE5		
2020	Gormint †		Amazon Prime Video	Unreleased	
2022	The Fame Game	Manish Khanna	Netflix		
2024	Tribhuvan Mishra CA Topper	Tribhuvan Mishra	Netflix		
2025	Real Kashmir Football Club	Shirish Kemmu	SonyLIV		

== Awards and nominations ==
=== Theatre ===
- Mahindra Excellence in Theatre Award for Best Script, 2006.
- Hindustan Times Mumbai's Most Stylish Theatre Personality Award, 2017.

=== Cinema ===
==== Filmfare Awards ====
Year	Film	Category	Result	Ref
2017	Tumhari Sulu	Best Supporting Actor	Nominated	
2022	Saina	Best Supporting Actor	Nominated	

==== Filmfare Short Film Awards ====
Year	Film	Category	Result	Ref
2023	Phir Kabhi	Best Actor Male	Won	

==== Filmfare OTT Awards ====
Year	Category	Film	Result	Ref
2021	Best Actor: Web Original Film	Ajeeb Daastaans	Nominated	
2023	Best Actor in a Short Film	Phir Kabhi	Won	
2024	Best Actor: Comedy	Tribhuvan Mishra CA Topper	Nominated	

==== Screen Awards ====
Year	Category	Film	Result	Ref
2015	Best Actor in a Negative Role (Male)	CityLights	Nominated	

==== Zee Cine Awards ====
Year	Category	Film	Result	Ref
2017	Best Actor in a Negative Role	Wazir	Nominated	

== Bibliography ==
Kaul's works are:

1. Theek Tumhare Peeche transl. 'Right Behind You' (14 March 2016): Short story collection.
2. Prem Kabootar transl. 'Love Dove' (8 February 2017): Short story collection. English translation: A Night in the Hills, (2019)
3. Tumhare Baare Mein transl. 'About You' (5 December 2018): English translation: A bird on my window sill (2023).
4. Bahut Door, Kitna Door Hota Hai transl. 'How Far is Farther' (7 November 2019): Travelogue English translation : A Mountain, A Lake and A Song
5. Chalta Phirta Pret transl. 'Wandering Specter' (10 July 2020): Short story collection
6. Antima (18 December 2020): Novel English translation: Under The Night Jasmine (2024)
7. Karta Ne Karm Se transl. 'The Doer through the Deed' (10 August 2021): Poetry collection
8. Shirt Ka Teesra Button transl. 'The Third Button of the Shirt' (30 March 2022): Novel
9. Rooh (7 June 2022): Travelogue. English translation: Rooh (2023).
10. Titali (17 January 2023): Novel
11. Tooti Hui Bikhri Hui (1 August 2023): Novel
12. Patjhad (23 November 2023): Novel
13. Katranein (29 May 2024): Neither story nor poetry.
14. Sakshatkaar (10 October 2024): Novel
15. Sanyam (18 July 2025): Novel
16. Nastik Ki Prarthana (May 2026): Poetry collection
