= List of players who have scored 3,000 or more runs in Twenty20 International cricket =

List of cricketers

Scoring over 3,000 runs in Twenty20 International (T20I) format of cricket is considered a significant achievement. In 2021, Indian batsman Virat Kohli became the first batsman to score 3,000 runs in T20Is.

In terms of innings, Pakistan's Mohammad Rizwan is the fastest (79 innings) to reach the 3,000 run mark.

As of June 2026, 15 players have scored 3,000 runs in T20Is. Out of them, 3 players are from India, 2 from Australia, Malaysia, and Pakistan, and 1 each from England, Ireland, New Zealand, South Africa, United Arab Emirates and Zimbabwe.

This list contains all the players who have scored 3,000 runs in T20I. By default the list is sorted in order of the day the feat is achieved. Overall career scores of these players will be updated on regular interval and not on daily basis.

== Key ==
- **Mat.** – denotes the number of matches played
- **Inn.** – denotes the number of innings batted
- **HS** – Highest score
- **Avg** – Runs scored per dismissal
- **S/R** – Strike rate runs scored per 100 balls
- **100** – Centuries scored
- **50** – Half-centuries scored
- **3KI** – denotes the number of innings the player took to reach 3,000 runs
- **Date** – denotes the date on which the player reached the 2,000 run mark
- **Bold text** – denotes that the player is still active

== Players with 3,000 or more T20I runs ==
Player list and statistics are updated as of November 2026.

3,000 or more runs in T20Is
No.	Player	Country	Mat.	Inn.	Runs	HS	Avg.	S/R	100	50	3KI	Date	Ref
1	Virat Kohli	India	125	117	4188	122*	48.69	137.04	1	38	81	14 March 2021	
2	Martin Guptill	New Zealand	122	118	3531	105	31.81	135.70	2	20	101	3 November 2021	
3	Rohit Sharma	India	159	151	4231	121*	32.05	140.89	5	32	108	8 November 2021	
4	**Paul Stirling**	Ireland	163	160	3895	115*	26.31	134.35	1	24	113	17 August 2022	
5	**Babar Azam**	Pakistan	145	136	4596	122	38.94	128.02	3	39	81	30 September 2022	
6	Aaron Finch	Australia	103	103	3120	172	34.28	142.53	2	19	98	9 October 2022	
7	David Warner	Australia	110	110	3277	100*	33.43	142.47	1	28	102	13 February 2024	
8	**Mohammad Rizwan**	Pakistan	106	93	3414	104*	47.41	125.37	1	30	79	20 April 2024	
9	**Jos Buttler**	England	163	150	4384	131	34.78	150.10	2	30	106	25 May 2024	
10	**Virandeep Singh**	Malaysia	131	123	3644	116*	37.18	126.70	1	26	98	24 July 2025	
11	**Muhammad Waseem**	United Arab Emirates	99	99	3371	112	36.24	150.96	3	26	84	15 September 2025	
12	**Suryakumar Yadav**	India	113	107	3272	117	36.35	162.94	4	25	98	31 January 2026	
13	**Quinton de Kock**	South Africa	110	109	3095	115	30.95	142.23	2	19	104	14 February 2026	
14	**Sikandar Raza**	Zimbabwe	147	142	3369	133*	26.11	136.50	2	17	127	26 February 2026	
15	**Syed Aziz**	Malaysia	137	128	3291	126	30.19	140.94	1	25	119	8 June 2026	

== See also ==
- List of Twenty20 International records
