= Peshawar Zalmi =

Peshawar-based cricket franchise in the Pakistan Super League

- پشاور زلمی
- Nickname: Yellow Storm
- League: Pakistan Super League

Personnel
- Captain: Babar Azam
- Coach: Ottis Gibson
- Owner: Javed Afridi

Team information
- City: Peshawar, Khyber Pakhtunkhwa, Pakistan
- Founded: 2015; 11 years ago
- Home ground: Imran Khan Cricket Stadium
- Capacity: 35,000

History
- PSL wins: 2 (2017, 2026)
- Official website: www.peshawarzalmi.com
Home kit
Away kit

The Peshawar Zalmi (Urdu: پشاور زلمی; Pashto: پېښور زلمي; meaning "Peshawar's Youth") are a professional Twenty20 cricket franchise that compete in the Pakistan Super League (PSL). The team is based in Peshawar, the capital of Khyber Pakhtunkhwa, Pakistan, and was established in 2015 following the announcement of the inaugural PSL by the Pakistan Cricket Board (PCB). The franchise is owned by Javed Afridi, CEO of Haier Pakistan.

Peshawar Zalmi have won the PSL title twice, in the 2017 and 2026 seasons. They defeated Quetta Gladiators in 2017, and Hyderabad Kingsmen in the 2026 final. The team have also finished as runners-up twice, in 2018 and 2021.

The team's home ground is Imran Khan Cricket Stadium in Peshawar. Babar Azam has captained the side since the 2023 season.

Kamran Akmal is the franchise's all-time leading run-scorer, while Wahab Riaz is its leading wicket-taker.

== Franchise history ==
On 3 December 2015, the Pakistan Cricket Board (PCB) unveiled the owners of five city-based franchises for the first season of the Pakistan Super League. The Peshawar franchise was sold to Javed Afridi for US$16 million for a ten-year period.

In November 2025, following the conclusion of the original contract, the franchise renewed its rights for another decade (2026–2035). The renewal was based on a valuation conducted by Ernst & Young, which shifted the financial model from US dollars to Pakistani Rupees. Under the new agreement, the annual franchise fee for Peshawar Zalmi was set at Rs. 490 million.

=== 2016 season ===
Peshawar began their 2016 season well, winning their first two matches. After a loss to Quetta Gladiators the team went on to win six of their eight group stage matches and finished first in the points table, qualifying for the playoffs. The first playoff match was against Quetta in qualifier 1. The match came down to the last ball Quetta winning by one run, Peshawar scoring 132 runs in reply to Quetta's 133 runs. As a result of their first-place position in the group table, Peshawar then went on to play Islamabad United in the second qualifier match. Peshawar also lost this match and were eliminated

=== 2017 season ===
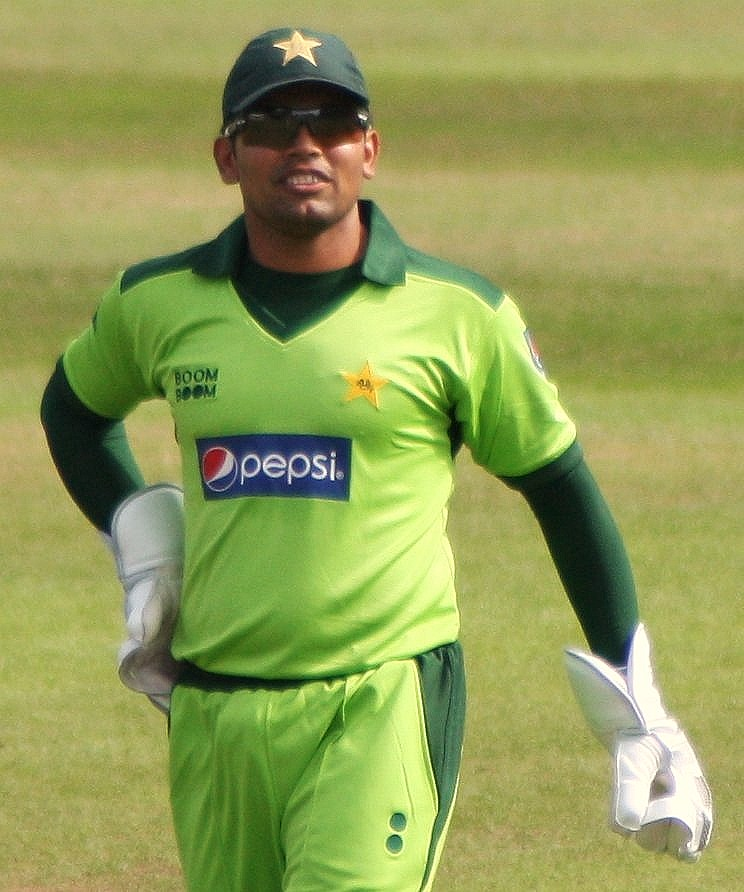
Kamran Akmal with 353 runs was the leading run-scorer and also the player of the tournament in 2017.

Peshawar traded Aamer Yamin for Sohaib Maqsood of Lahore Qalandars during the off-season. During the 2017 Pakistan Super League players draft they retained 10 players and signed eight, including Overseas players Shakib Al Hasan, Eoin Morgan, Chris Jordan and Alex Hales. Shakib and Tamim were not available for selection during the initial stage of tournament due to national duties as they were in India to play only test match. Later Alex Hales and Shakib Al Hasan were replaced with Tillakaratne Dilshan and Marlon Samuels and Mohammad Shahzad was replaced with Andre Fletcher while Tamim Iqbal was replaced with Samit Patel.

In their first game of PSL 2017, Peshawar Zalmi lost to the Islamabad United by 7 wickets. In their next game against Karachi Kings, Zalmi won by 7 wickets in pursuit of 120 runs. Eoin Morgan starred in the chase with an unbeaten innings of 80 runs off 57 balls. Following this the Zalmi were involved in a low-scoring thriller with the Lahore Qalandars that saw the former collapse in the chase of just 60 runs before getting over the line with 3 wickets to spare.

As the tournament moved to Sharjah, Zalmi's first game against Quetta Gladiators was abandoned after repeated showers and the two teams shared the points from the bout. Following this, against Islamabad United, the Zalmis lost a hard-fought game that went down to the last ball. After being put in to bat by United, Zalmi could only manage a below-par score of 137 runs and never really got going. But the team's bowlers bowled exceedingly well to make a contest out of it. In their final game of the Sharjah leg, the Zalmis continued their losing streak after being beaten by Karachi Kings in a thrilling contest. Setting up a target of 175 runs, the Kings had the Zalmis reduced to 69–6 before Shahid Afridi and Darren Sammy combined in a 70-runs partnership that almost won the game for the Zalmis. However, they couldn't see the game through as the Zalmis fell short by 9 runs.

With the tournament shifting back to Dubai, the Zalmis registered consecutive wins against Lahore Qalandars and Quetta Gladiators respectively. Against the Qalandars, the team put up a target of 167 runs and then successful defended it after inducing a batting collapse of 5 wickets for 6 runs from the opposition. In the end prevailing by 17 runs and securing a playoff spot. But with the Gladiators, the team suffered a batting collapse of their own. Chasing a below-par total of 129 runs, the Zalmis were at one time reduced to 52–6 before a vintage performance from Shahid Afridi, who scored 45 off 23 balls, ensured that his team won with 2 wickets left intact. In the first playoffs (qualifier 1) they faced Gladiators at Sharjah it proved to be a replica of last year qualifier 1 where quetta clinched 1 run win over Zalmi. after sent into bat by Zalmi Quetta gave a huge target of 200 runs thanks to Ahmed Shahzad for his 71 off 38 balls. In reply Zalmi had a poor start losing 2 early wickets for less than 10 runs, then came Mohammad Hafeez who started hitting Gladiators all over the stadium he with Dawid Malan put up a 100+ runs partnership. After Hafeez got out Shahid Afridi came looking in best six hitting form scoring 34 off just 17 balls shifting match in Zalmi's favour, but got out at wrong time and as a result Zalmi collapsed in the last over of the match. Left arm spinner for Quetta, Muhammad Nawaz was the bowler who didn't let Zalmi score 2 runs off last 3 balls hence, Gladiators progressed into the final and Zalmi into the qualifier 2 where they defeated Karachi Kings by 24 runs. Batting first Zalmi scored 181 runs for 3 wickets due to Kamran Akmal's brilliant 104 runs from 65 balls. Wahab Riaz and Chris Jordan 3-for took Zalmi into the final for the first time ever. Kamran was adjudged man of the match in the end.

In the final, Zalmis defeated Quetta Gladiators – the runners-up of the inaugural edition of the PSL, by 58 runs batting first. Zalmi's left-arm spinner Mohammad Asghar took 3 wickets for 16 runs. In the first innings, Gladiators' Rayad Emrit took 2 wickets in the 17th over, which left the score at 112 runs for 6 wickets but Darren Sammy clubbed 33 runs in the last two overs taking the Zalmis total to 148 runs.

=== 2018 season ===
In the opening match of 2018 season, defending champions Zalmi suffered a loss against new entrants Multan Sultans by 7 wickets. The next game, Zalmi secured a comfortable 34-runs win over Islamabad United. Defending a target of 176 runs, Zalmi's debuting fast bowler, Umaid Asif, was the star performer as he reduced the opposition to 25–4 inside the powerplay. Continuing on, the team suffered a loss against Karachi Kings in a closely fought game. Batting first, the Zalmis lost wickets with regular consistency. Only Dwayne Smith's unbeaten innings of 71 runs got them to a respectable total of 131 runs. Defending it, they took the game to the last three balls before the Kings prevailed by 5 wickets.

As the tournament shifted to Sharjah, the team won a thriller against rivals Quetta Gladiators. Batting first, the Gladiators set a target of 143 runs in a batting display that was punctuated with starts and stops on a two-paced pitch. In reply, the Zalmis were on course for victory at 107–2 before losing three quick wickets to end up requiring 22 runs from the last two overs. At this point, an injured Darren Sammy single-handedly won the match for his team by striking 16 runs from 4 balls to finish the game with 2 balls to go. The following game, the Zalmis beat Lahore Qalandars comfortably in the chase of a low target of 101 runs. The margin of the win was 10 wickets – the first such instance in the history of the PSL. Additionally, this was the first game for Zalmi's main pacer, Hasan Ali this season as he had been sidelined due to an injury.

In the final, Peshawar Zalmi lost to Islamabad United by three wickets. Peshawar Zalmi won the toss and elected to bat first. Peshawar's in-form batsman Kamran Akmal was out lbw for 1 run off 8 balls, with Samit Patel taking the wicket in the third over early on. Chris Jordan and Liam Dawson were involved in a fourth-wicket fifty-partnership. Later, Wahab Riaz's 28 runs off 14 balls ensured their team reached to a total of 148 runs. Islamabad's Luke Ronchi hit five sixes in the first five overs as he raced to 45 runs off just 15 balls, before he got out in the ninth over after scoring a 26-ball 52, batting second. But a sudden collapse resulted in Islamabad losing six wickets for 20 runs leaving them at 116/6. Akmal then dropped a catch at fine leg when Asif Ali attempted a pull shot off Umaid Asif with Islamabad needing 30 runs off 33 balls. Asif Ali then hit three sixes on the trot off Hasan Ali. Islamabad's Faheem Ashraf hooked Wahab Riaz for six with just one run required in the 17th over.

=== 2019 season ===
Peshawar Zalmi finished the group stage with first position by winning seven of their matches and losing only three. Peshawar came on top because of the higher run rate. Peshawar Zalmi lost to Quetta Gladiators in the qualifier by 10 runs.

In the final in Karachi, Peshawar Zalmi lost to Gladiators by 8 wickets becoming the runners up.

=== 2020 season ===
In January before the season started, they signed Hashim Amla as batting mentor of the team, replacing Younis Khan for the job.

=== 2021 season ===
Peshawar Zalmi concluded the tournament in the Pakistan Super League with a respectable standing. Having played 10 matches, they secured 5 wins and experienced 5 losses, accumulating a total of 10 points.

=== 2025 season ===
Zalmi finished 5th on the points table and exited in group stage.

=== 2026 season ===
Peshawar Zalmi were coached by Ottis Gibson and captained by Babar Azam during the 2026 Pakistan Super League. They finished the league stage at the top of the points table with 17 points, losing one match during the group stage. Peshawar qualified for the final after defeating Islamabad United by 70 runs in the Qualifier.

In the final, played on 3 May 2026 at Gaddafi Stadium, Lahore, Peshawar Zalmi defeated Hyderabad Kingsmen by five wickets to win their second Pakistan Super League title. Hyderabad were bowled out for 129 in 18 overs, and Peshawar reached the target in 15.2 overs, finishing on 130/5. Aaron Hardie was named player of the match after taking 4 wickets for 27 runs and scoring an unbeaten 56.

== Team identity ==
The team's identity was unveiled on 13 December 2015 by owner Javed Afridi at the Army Public School Peshawar. The name Zalmi is a Pashto word meaning "youth." The logo depicts a traditional Peshawari turban with cricket stumps, using shades of blue, yellow, and white to represent the region's pride, skies, and energy of the people. Originally yellow and blue, the kit colours switched to yellow and black starting in PSL 4.

In 2019, Nielsen valued the franchise at US$40.5 million, ranking it as Pakistan's biggest sports entity. The team has engaged various celebrity ambassadors over the years, including actors Hamza Ali Abbasi, Mahira Khan, Humaima Malick, and Sana Javed. Regional artist Gul Panra and Turkish actress Esra Bilgiç have also represented the franchise.

Year	Kit manufacturer	Shirt sponsor (chest)	Shirt sponsor (back)	Chest branding	Sleeve branding
2016	Zalmi In-House	Bahria Town	Giggly Boom Boom	Brighto Paints	Hum TV, Junaid Jamshed, Zic Oil
2017	Zalmi In-House	General Petroleum	Giggly Boom Boom	Jivi Mobiles	Super Power, Jang, Khaleej Times
2018	Zalmi In-House	Haier	RD	MGI	McDonald's Pakistan, Dawn News, Jang
2019	Zalmi In-House	Haier	Zalmi TV	RD	McDonald's Pakistan, Sprite, TCL
2020	Zalmi In-House	Haier	TCL	Huawei	McDonald's Pakistan, Sprite, Airlink, MG
2021	Zalmi In-House	Haier	TCL	Huawei	McDonald's Pakistan, Oppo, Airlink
2022	Zalmi In-House	Haier	TCL	Huawei	McDonald's Pakistan, MG, Turkish Airlines
2023	Gym Armour	Haier	TCL	Huawei	McDonald's Pakistan, MG, 100 Century Town, Ventured Knowmads
2024	Gym Armour	Haier	Ufone	Huawei	Bank Makramah, Dany Tech, TCL Corporation
2025	Bank Makramah	Haier	Ufone	Cheezious	Clear Men, EFU Insurance, Newage Cables

== International representation ==
=== Sponsorship ===
Turkish Airlines signed a deal to become the official airline sponsor of the franchise for Pakistan Super League 6 starting 20 February 2021.

=== Global Zalmi ===
Global Zalmi comprises the International Sports Branches of Peshawar Zalmi spread across 25 countries. Each year the teams from these countries come and play the Global Zalmi League.

== Current squad ==
Key
- Players with international caps are listed in **bold**.
- * denotes a player who is fully unavailable
- * denotes a player who will be partially unavailable

No.	Name	Nationality	Birth date	Salary	Batting style	Bowling style	Year signed	Notes
Batsmen
56	**Babar Azam**	Pakistan	15 October 1994 (age 32)	PKR 7.0 crore	Right-handed	Right-arm off break	2022	Captain
43	**Abdul Samad**	Pakistan	25 January 1998 (age 28)	PKR 2.8 crore	Right-handed	Right-arm leg break	2025	
14	**James Vince**	England	14 March 1991 (age 35)	PKR 3.00 crore	Right-handed	Right-arm medium pace	2026	
45	**Mirza Tahir Baig**	Pakistan	15 October 1998 (age 28)	PKR 60 lakh	Right-handed	Right-arm medium pace	2026	
20	Farhan Yousaf	Pakistan	15 December 2007 (age 18)	PKR 60 lakh	Right-handed	—	2026	
97	**Tanzid Hasan**	Bangladesh	1 December 2000 (age 25)	PKR 60 lakh	Left-handed	—	2026	
Wicket-keepers
29	**Mohammad Haris**	Pakistan	30 March 2001 (age 25)	PKR 2.20 crore	Right-handed	—	2026	
1	**Kusal Mendis**	Sri Lanka	2 February 1995 (age 31)	PKR 4.20 crore	Right-handed	—	2026	
All-rounders
21	**Aaron Hardie**	Australia	7 January 1999 (age 27)	PKR 6.30 crore	Right-handed	Right-arm medium-fast	2026	
4	**Michael Bracewell**	New Zealand	14 February 1991 (age 35)	PKR 4.20 crore	Left-handed	Right-arm off break	2026	
95	**Iftikhar Ahmed**	Pakistan	3 September 1990 (age 36)	PKR 1.80 crore	Right-handed	Right-arm off break	2026	
65	**Aamir Jamal**	Pakistan	5 July 1996 (age 30)	PKR 1.90 crore	Right-handed	Right-arm medium-fast	2026	
7	Khalid Usman	Pakistan	20 May 1986 (age 40)	PKR 60 lakh	Right-handed	Slow left arm orthodox	2026	
86	**Brian Bennett**	Zimbabwe	10 November 2003 (age 23)	PKR 25,67 core	Right-handed	Right-arm off break	2026	
Bowlers
13	**Sufiyan Muqeem**	Pakistan	15 November 1999 (age 26)	PKR 4.48 crore	Left-handed	Left-arm unorthodox	2023	
18	Ali Raza	Pakistan	18 March 2008 (age 18)	PKR 1.96 crore	Right-handed	Right-arm medium-fast	2025	
23	Abdul Subhan	Pakistan	14 October 2004 (age 22)	PKR 62.5 lakh	Right-handed	Right-arm medium-fast	2026	
49	**Khurram Shahzad**	Pakistan	1 October 1999 (age 27)	PKR 2.70 crore	Right-handed	Right-arm fast-medium	2026	
45	**Nahid Rana**	Bangladesh	2 October 2002 (age 24)	PKR 60 lakh	Right-handed	Right-arm fast	2026	
29	Kashif Ali	Pakistan	N/A	PKR 60 lakh	N/A	N/A	2026	
27	**Shahnawaz Dahani**	Pakistan	5 August 1998 (age 28)	PKR 60 lakh	Right-handed	Right-arm fast-medium	2026	
74	**Shoriful Islam**	Bangladesh	3 June 2001 (age 25)	PKR 60 lakh	Left-handed	Left-arm fast-medium	2026	
3	Mohammad Basit	Pakistan	1 December 1999 (age 26)	PKR 60 lakh	Left-handed	Left-arm medium-fast	2026	

- Source: ESPNcricinfo

== Management and coaching staff ==
Name	Position
Ottis Gibson	Head coach
Mohammad Akram	Director of cricket
Azhar Mahmood	Assistant & bowling coach
Misbah-ul-Haq	Batting coach
Azhar Ali	Fielding coach
Michael Yardy	Spin bowling & fielding coach
Zafar Iqbal	Medical advisor
Mian Abbas Layaq	Chief operating officer (COO)

- Source: Official website

== Captains ==
Name	From	To	Mat	Won	Lost	Tie&W	Tie&L	NR	Win%
Shahid Afridi	2016	2016	10	6	4	0	0	0	60.00
Darren Sammy	2017	2020	39	22	16	0	0	1	57.89
Mohammad Hafeez	2018	2018	2	1	1	0	0	0	50.00
Wahab Riaz	2020	2022	28	13	14	1	0	0	48.21
Shoaib Malik	2021	2022	2	1	1	0	0	0	50.00
Babar Azam	2023	present	32	15	17	0	0	0	46.87
Tom Kohler-Cadmore	2023	2023	1	1	0	0	0	0	100.00

Source: ESPNcricinfo, Last updated: 26 March 2024

== Result summary ==
=== Overall result in PSL ===
Year	Pld	Won	Lost	Tie	NR	Position	Summary
2016	8	6	2	0	0	1/5	Play-offs
2017	8	4	3	0	1	1/5	Champions
2018	10	5	5	0	0	3/6	Runners-up
2019	10	7	3	0	0	1/6	Runners-up
2020	10	4	5	0	1	4/6	Play-offs
2021	10	5	5	0	0	3/6	Runners-up
2022	10	6	4	0	0	3/6	Play-offs
2023	10	5	5	0	0	4/6	Play-offs
2024	10	6	3	0	1	2/6	Play-offs
2025	10	4	6	0	0	5/6	League Stage
Total	96	52	41	0	3	1 Title	

=== Performance visuals ===
League position by season
1st										
2nd										
3rd										
5th										
	'16	'17	'18	'19	'20	'21	'22	'23	'24	'25

Win/loss ratio (2016–2025)
■ Wins	54.1%
■ Losses	42.7%
■ N/R	3.2%

=== Head-to-head record ===
Opposition	Span	Mat	Won	Lost	Tie&W	Tie&L	NR	SR (%)
Islamabad United	2016–2025	26	13	13	0	0	0	50.00
Karachi Kings	2016–2025	23	15	8	0	0	0	65.21
Lahore Qalandars	2016–2025	21	11	9	1	0	0	54.76
Multan Sultans	2018–2025	18	7	11	0	0	0	38.88
Quetta Gladiators	2016–2025	26	13	12	0	0	1	52.00
Rawalpindiz	2026-2026	1	1	0	0	0	0	100.00

PZ success vs opponents (2025)
13:13	15:8	11:9	7:11	13:12
IU	KK	LQ	MS	QG

Key: ■ PZ Won | ■ IU | ■ KK | ■ LQ | ■ MS | ■ QG
Source: ESPNcricinfo, Last updated: 23 February 2026

== Statistics ==
As of 22 February 2026

=== Most runs ===
Player	Years	Innings	Runs	High score
Kamran Akmal	2016–2022	74	1,972	107*
Babar Azam	2023–2025	32	1,379	115
Shoaib Malik	2020–2022	32	1,033	73
Mohammad Haris	2022–2025	36	905	87
Saim Ayub	2023–2025	33	860	88

Most runs (PZ 2026)
1972	1379	1033	905	860
Akmal	Babar	Malik	Haris	Ayub

- Source: ESPNcricinfo

=== Most wickets ===
Player	Years	Innings	Wickets	Best bowling
Wahab Riaz	2016–2023	87	113	4/17
Hasan Ali	2016–2020	44	59	4/15
Salman Irshad	2022–2024	22	30	3/29
Umaid Asif	2018–2021	29	28	4/23
Luke Wood	2024–2025	19	23	3/28

Most wickets (PZ 2026)
113	59	30	28	23
Wahab	Hasan	Salman	Umaid	Wood

- Source: ESPNcricinfo

== See also ==
- List of Pakistan Super League anthems
- Islamabad United
- Karachi Kings
- Lahore Qalandars
- Multan Sultan
- Quetta Gladiators
