= Plug-in electric vehicles in Pakistan =

Electric vehicle market in Pakistan

Pakistan has a significant market for hybrid vehicles such as Honda's Vezel, Toyota's Prius, and Aqua. The Automotive Development Policy (2016–2021) and the launch of the China-Pakistan Economic Corridor (CPEC) encourage foreign investments for new automobile brands to enter the Pakistani market.

The leading manufacturers in the automobile industry in Pakistan are interested in introducing electric vehicle (EV) models with a wide range of prices for consumers of diverse income groups. Several members of the international automobile industry including South Korea, China, and Japan also believe that Pakistan has a high potential market for EV technology, leading them to collaborate with local businesses to bring EVs to Pakistan.

== Market ==
=== Current players in electric cars and SUVs market ===
==== Audi ====
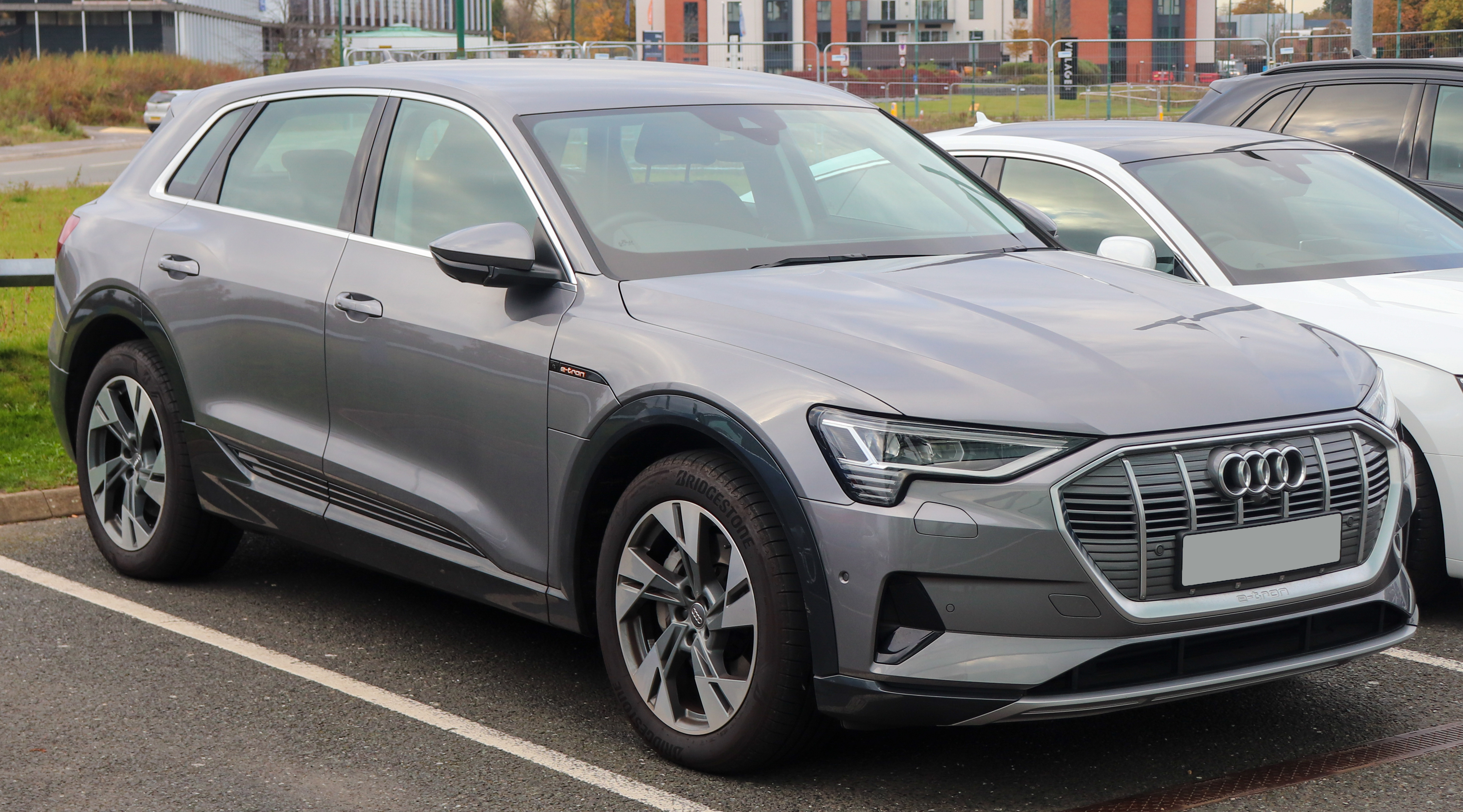
The 2020 Audi e-Tron Sport 50 Quattro

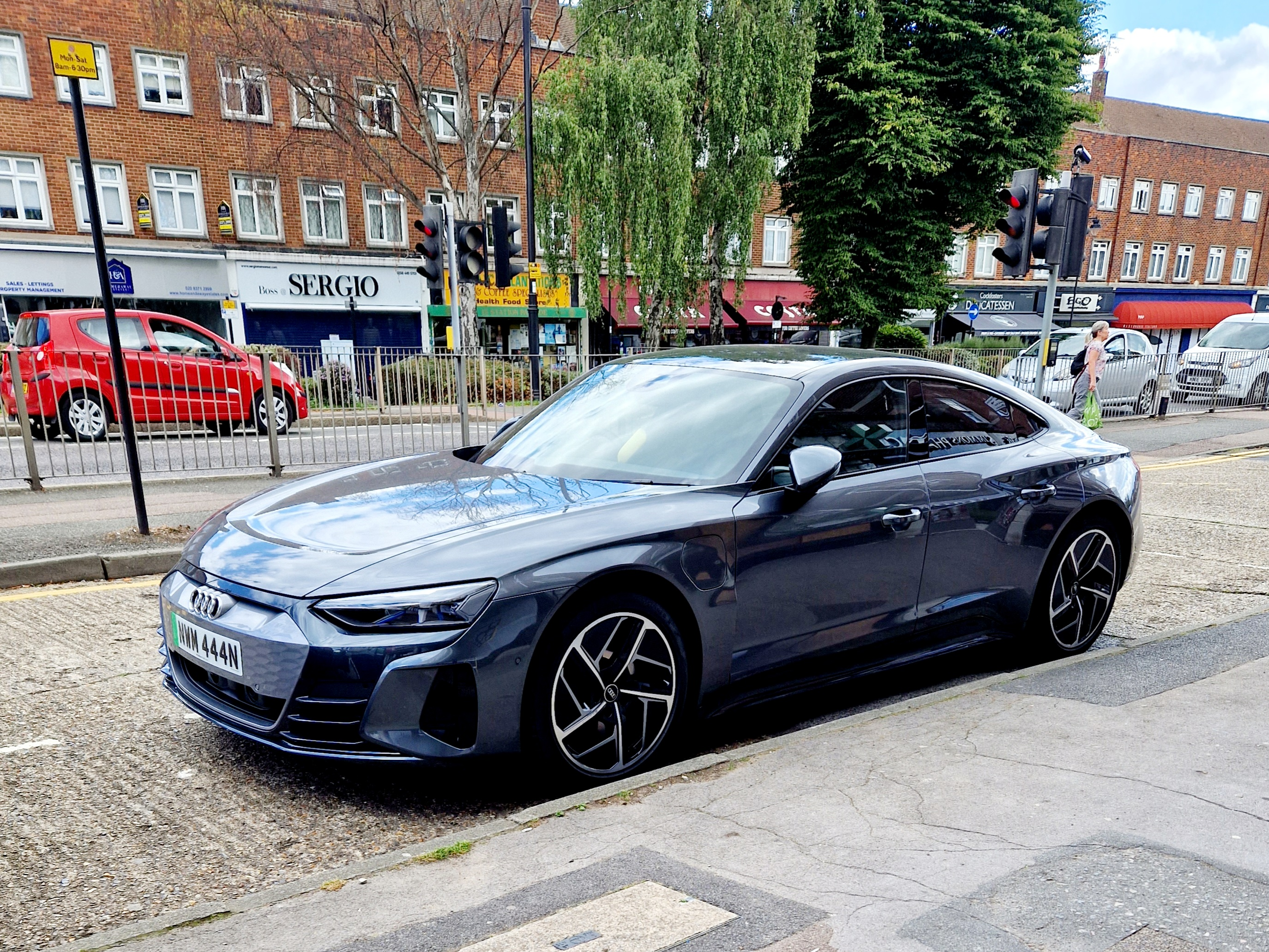
Audi e-Tron GT

Audi launched its e-Tron 50 Quattro in Pakistan in April 2020, making it the first electric car to debut in Pakistan. Audi Pakistan imports the CBU units of these EVs from Germany. Currently, Audi offers its e-Tron, e-Tron Sportback, e-Tron GT Quattro, and RS e-Tron GT on bookings in Pakistan.

==== Avatr Technology ====
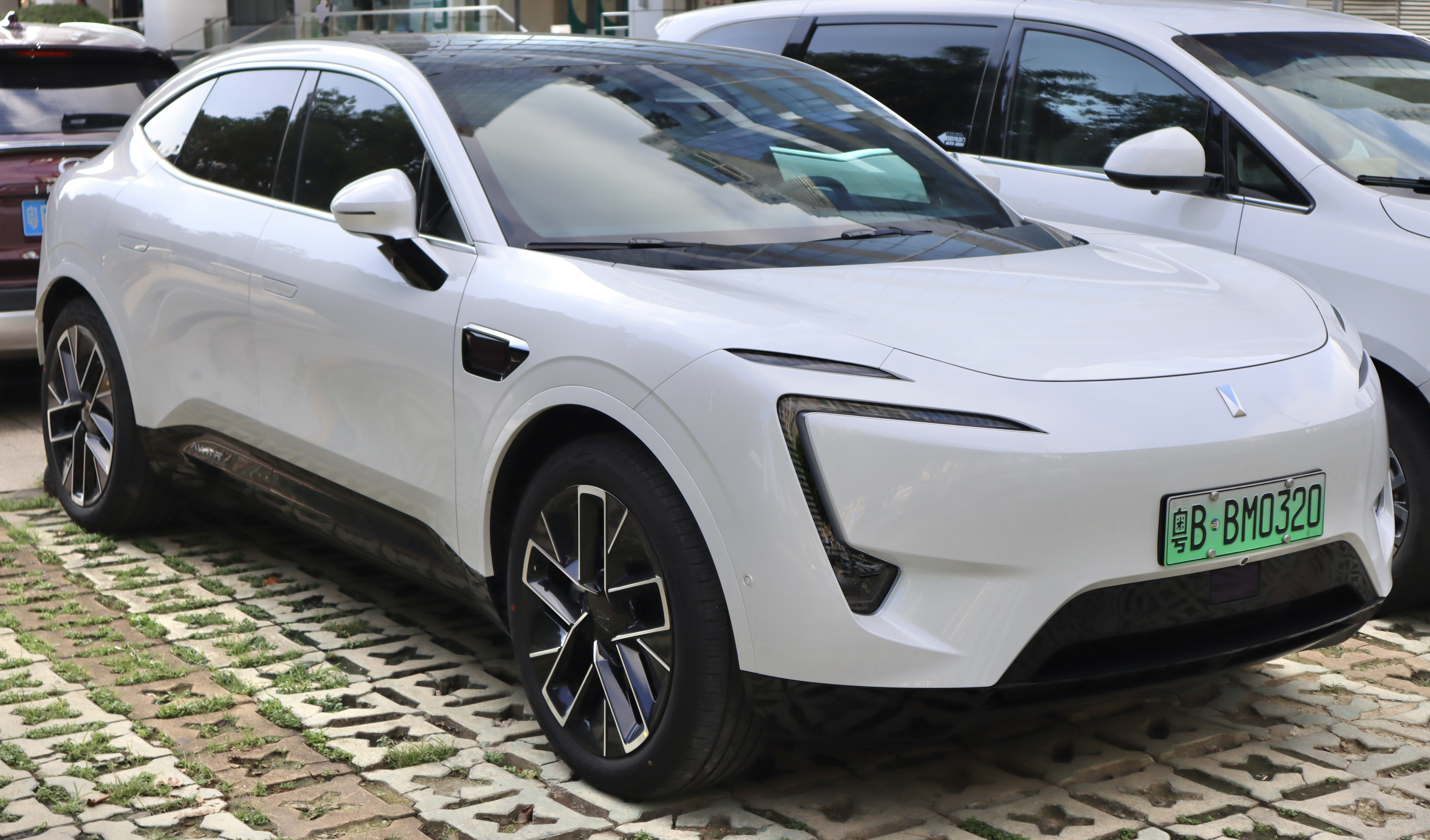
Avatr 11

Avatr Technology launched its Avatr 11 in Pakistan in December 2025, officially entering the Pakistani market through Master Changan Motors.

==== BMW ====
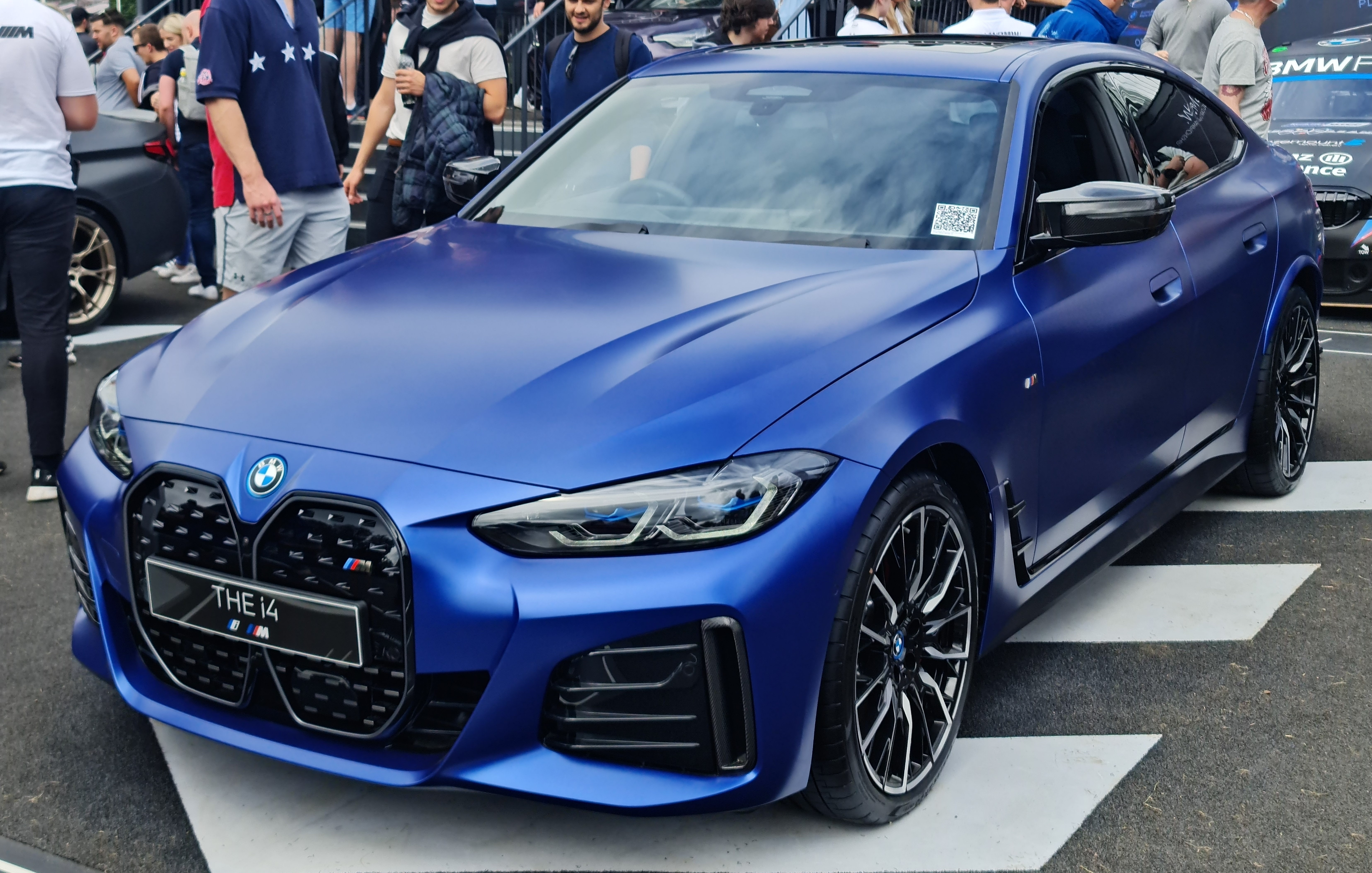
BMW i4

BMW exports its BMW IX, IX3, and I4 as CBU units through Dewan Motors in Pakistan.

==== BYD Pakistan ====
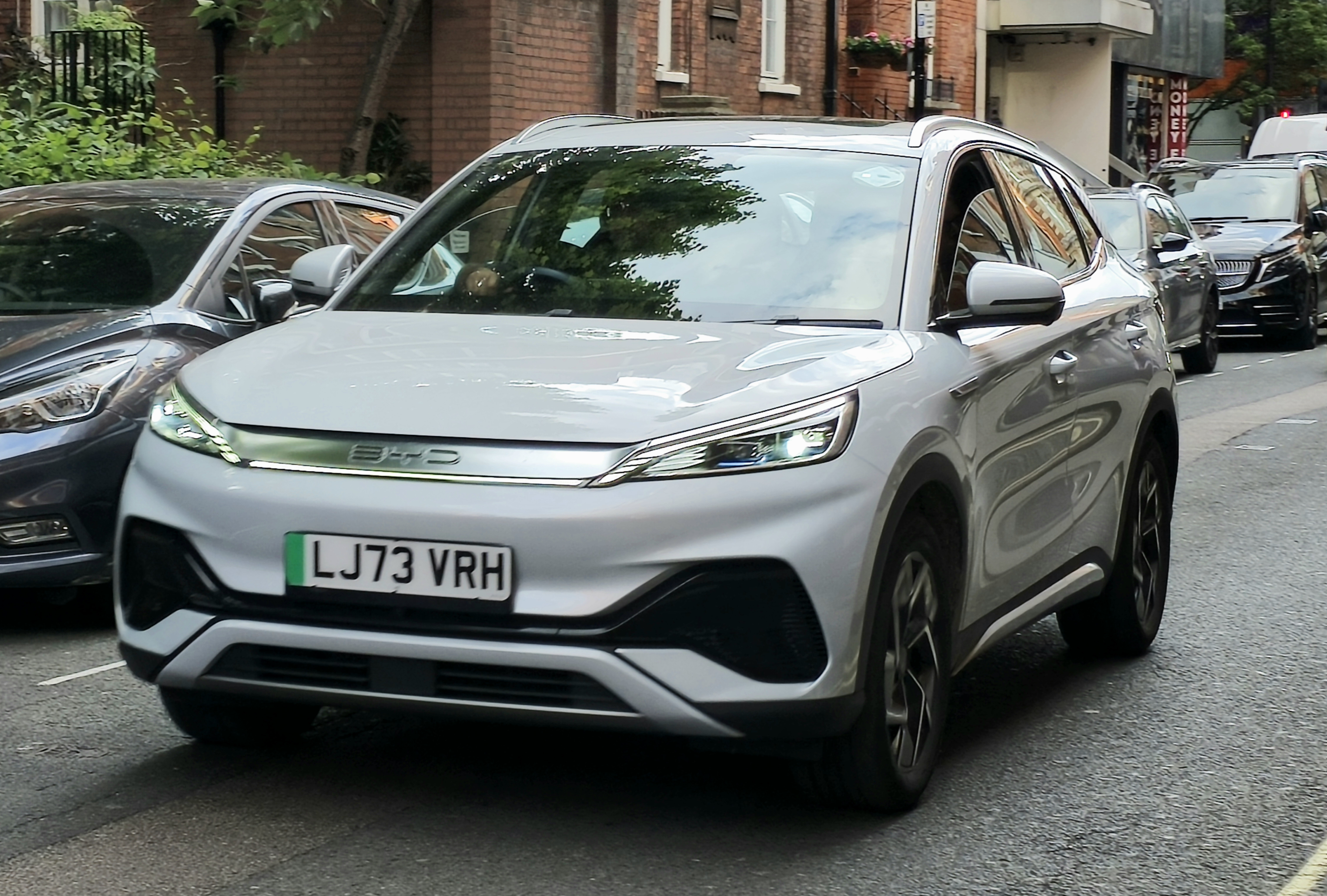
BYD Atto 3

BYD officially launched in Pakistan in August 2024, new energy vehicles like the Atto 3, Atto 2, Seal and Sealion were initially unveiled. Partnering with Mega Motor Company, BYD Pakistan established assembly plants in Sindh, Pakistan. As of 2026 BYD is the largest supplier of electric vehicles to Pakistan.

==== Deepal ====
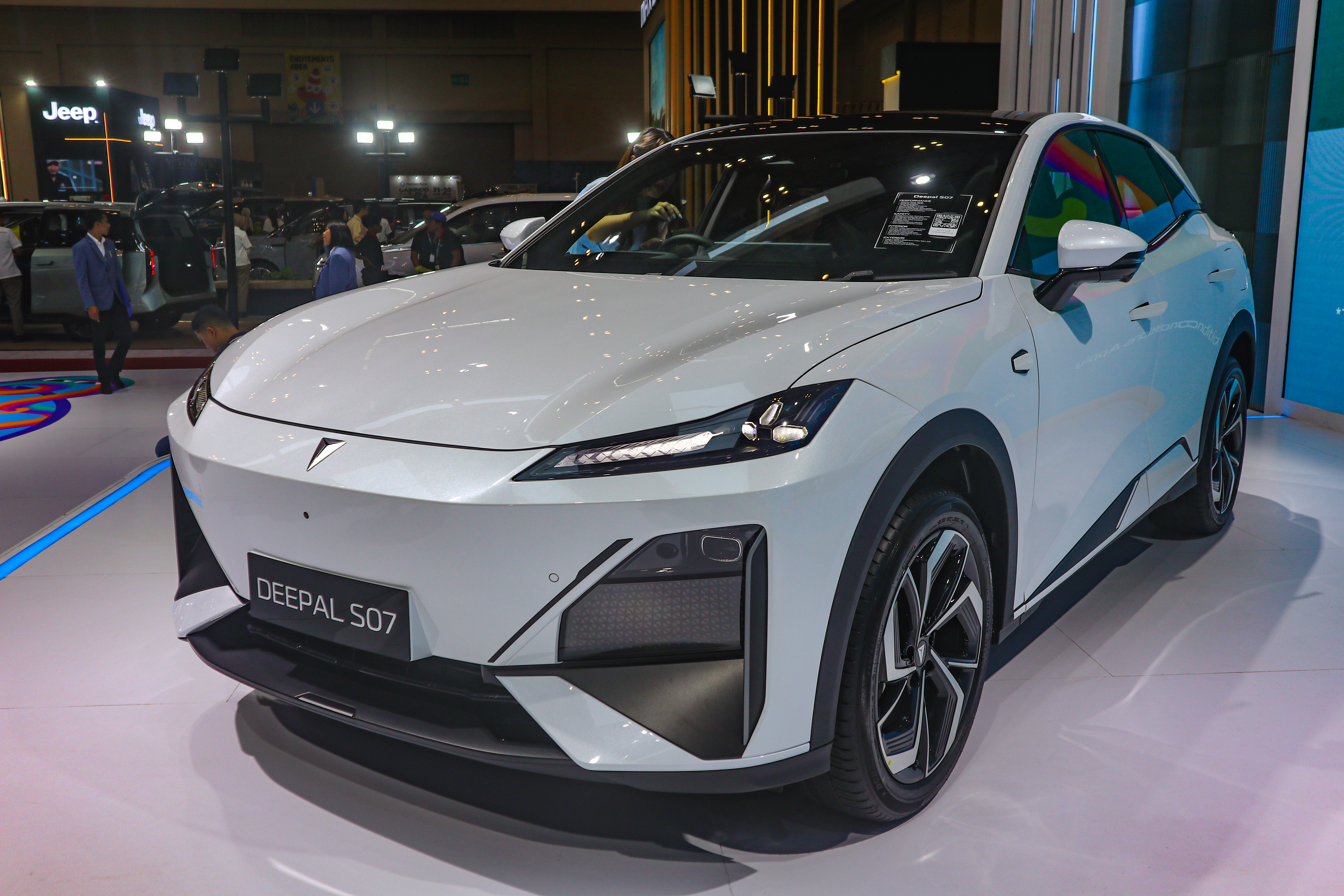
Deepal S07

Deepal initially debuted in Pakistan on August 16, 2024, with the showcase of two premium models: the Deepal S07 and the Deepal L07. Partnering with Master motors, Deepal is locally assembling vehicles in Pakistan.

==== Great Wall Motor ====
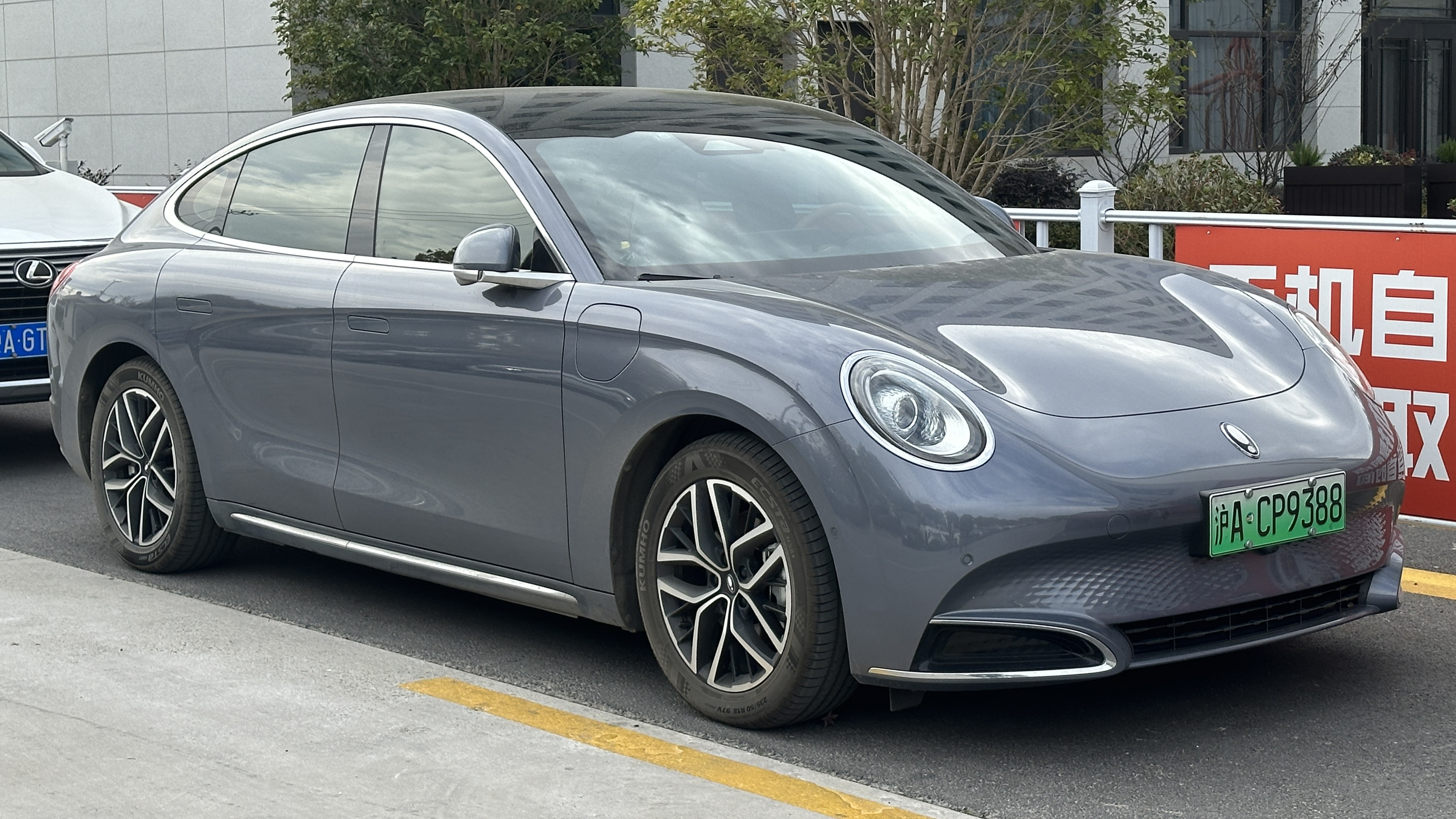
Ora 07

Great Wall Motor launched the Ora 5 and Ora 07 in Pakistan in 2024.

==== GAC Pakistan ====
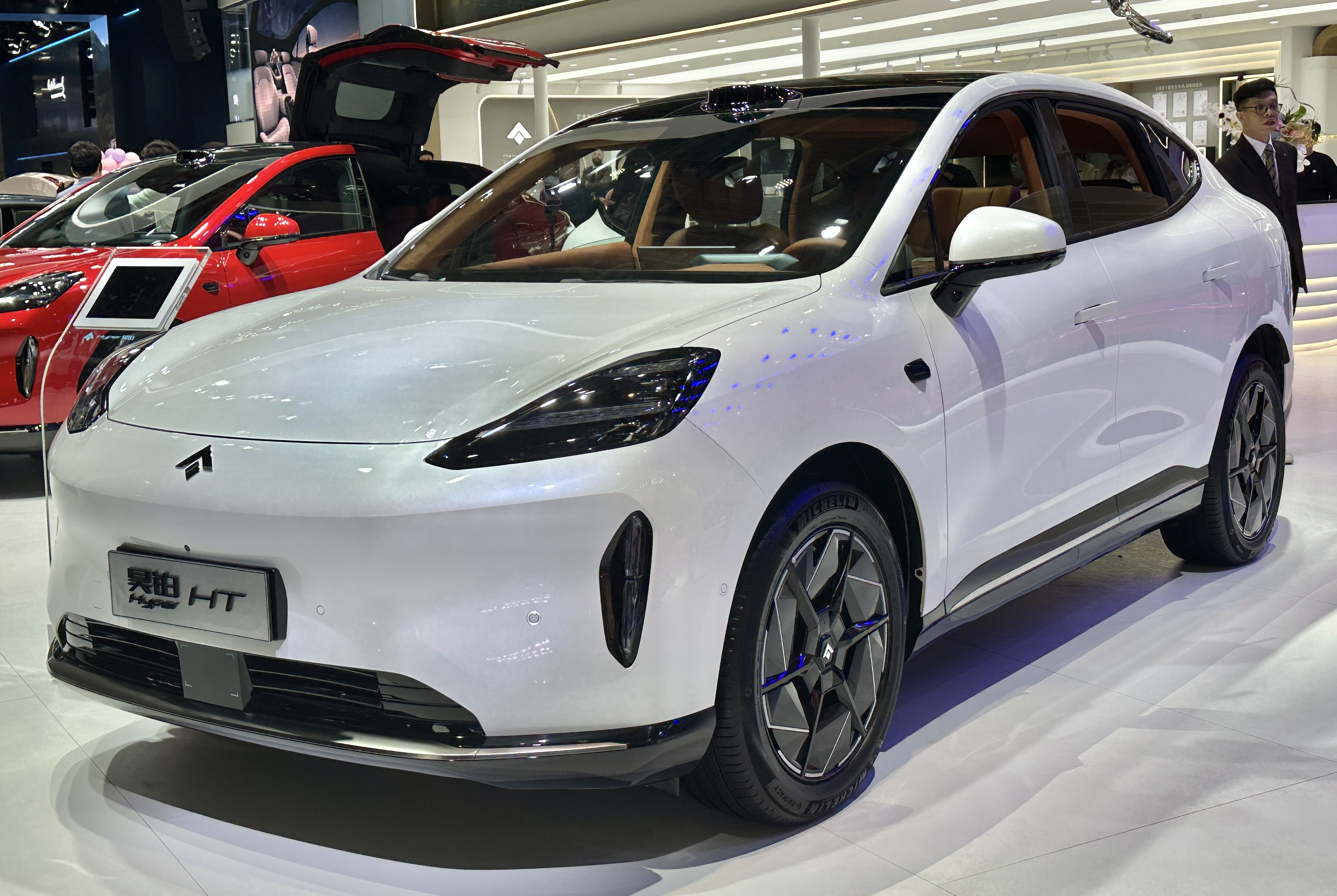
Hyptec HT

GAC launched their HYPTEC and AION series in Pakistan in 2026.

==== Haval ====
Haval HEV H6 hybrid EV is being assembled in Pakistan under a joint venture of Sazgar and Great Wall Motor. Haval Jolion is assembled in Pakistan since 2023.

==== Jaecoo ====
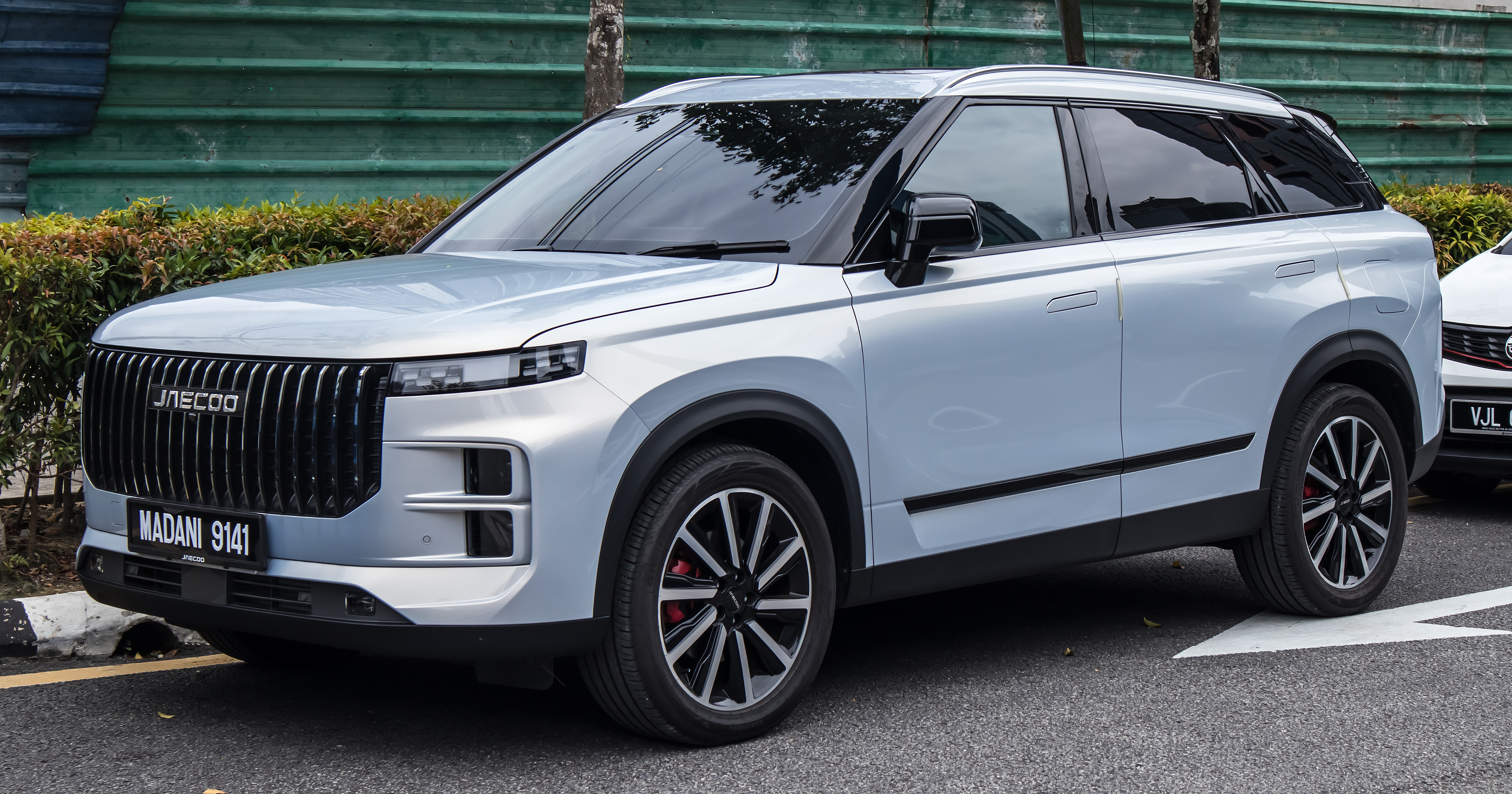
Jaecoo J7

Since 2026, Jaecoo has launched the Jaecoo J5, Jaecoo J6 and the Jaecoo J7 in Pakistan, with them also being assembled in Faisalabad.

==== Karakorum Motors ====
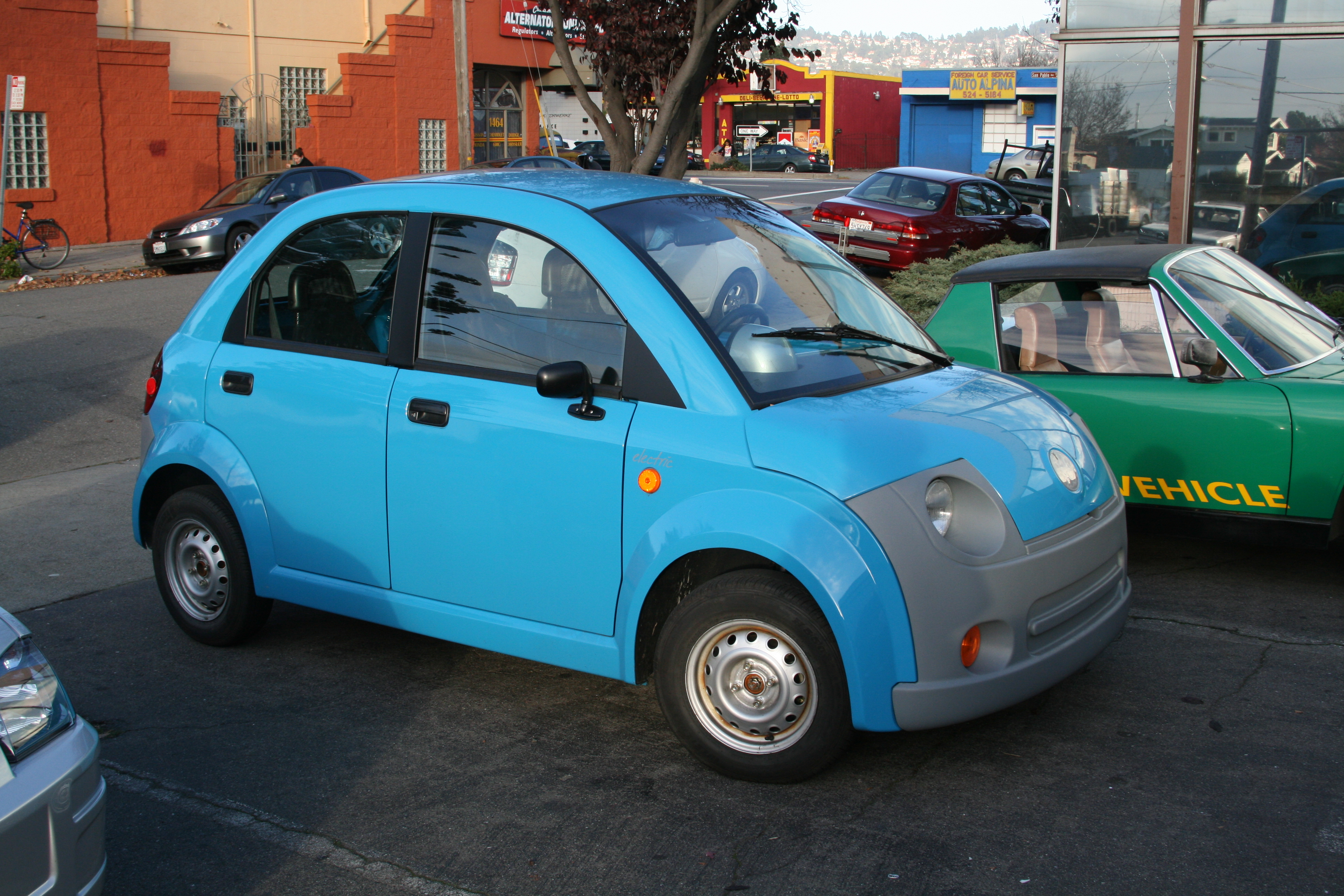
Dynasty IT was bought by Karakoram Motors of Pakistan, and now it is manufactured in Pakistan.

Karakoram Motors is a Pakistani automobile manufacturer based in Karachi, Sindh, Pakistan. It is the authorized assembler and manufacturer of Dynasty IT electric cars.

==== MG Pakistan ====
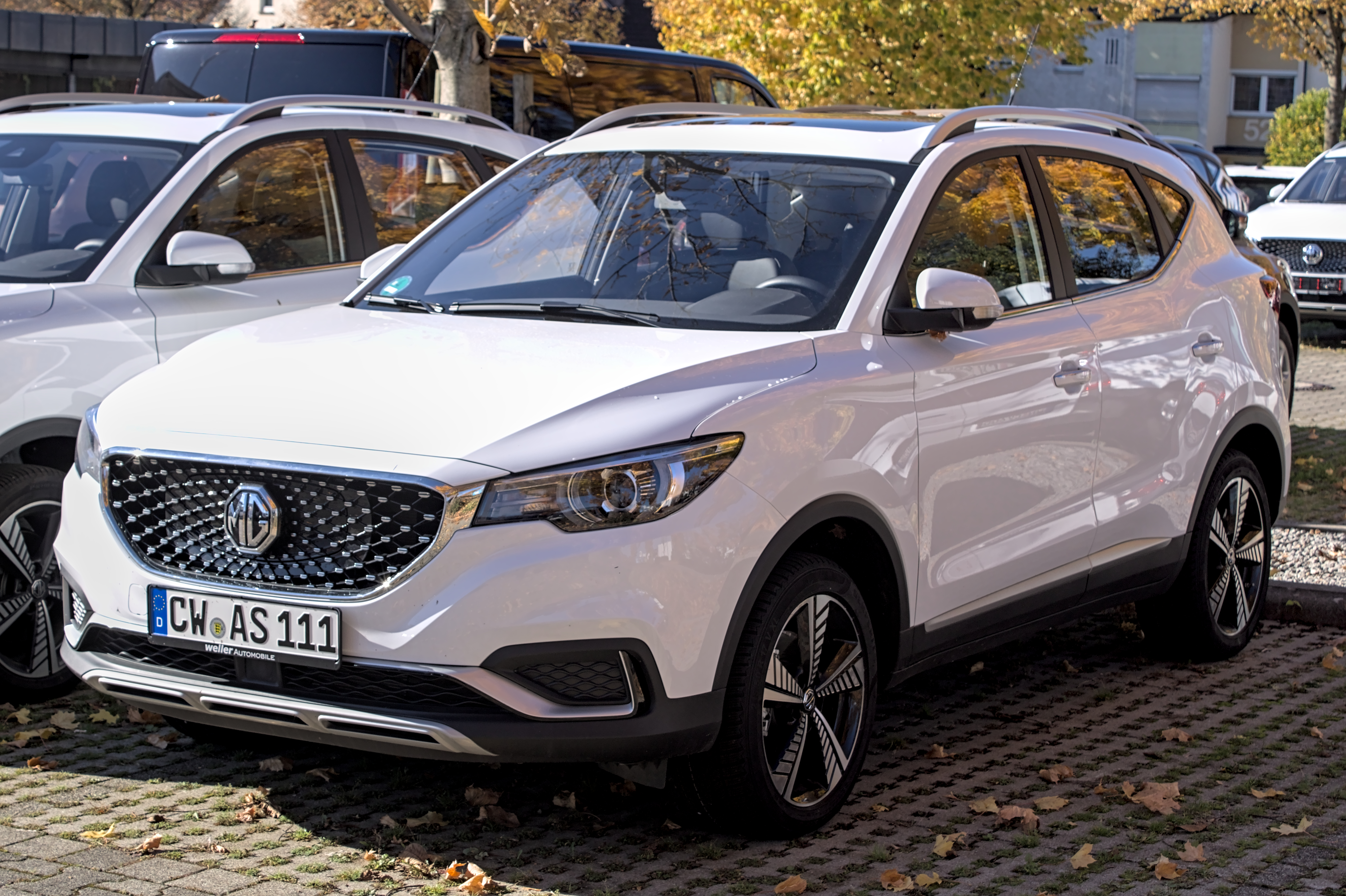
MG ZS EV

MG JW Automobile is a joint venture between JW-SEZ Group and SAIC motors. In May 2020, JW Auto Park signed a memorandum of understanding with Morris Garages regarding manufacturing and assembling of their electric cars in Pakistan. JW-SEZ Group has also expressed its interest in launching the Wuling Hongguang Mini EV to the Pakistani market. MG Motors offers its MG ZS EV in Pakistan.

==== Nevo ====
Master Changan Motors is poised to launch the Nevo Q05 this year in Pakistan.

==== Seres ====
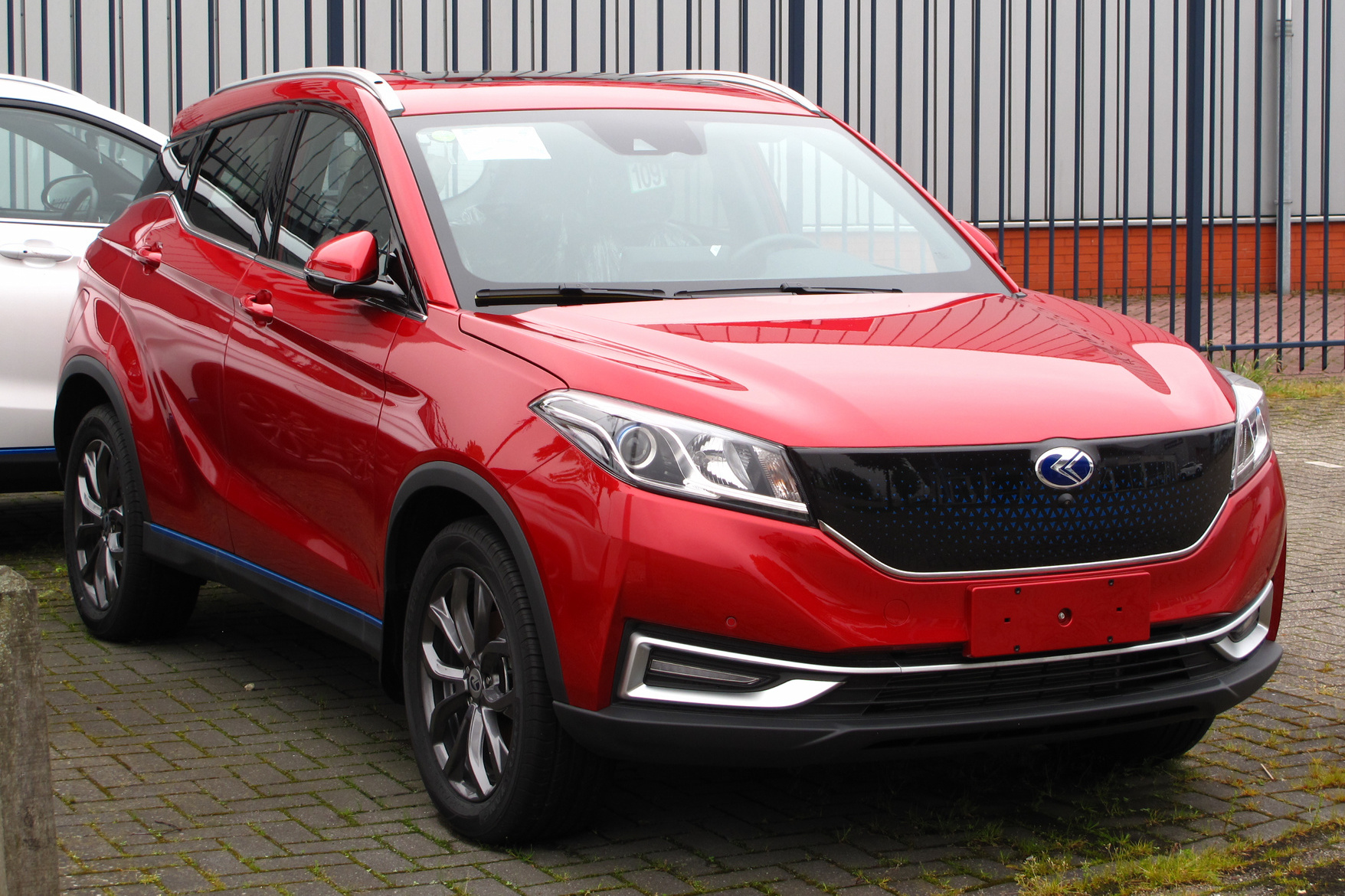
Seres 3

A collaboration between Regal Automobiles Industries Limited and Seres Corporation (DFSK) has led to the local assembly of Seres 3 plug-in electric vehicles in Pakistan.

=== Electric scooters, motorcycles and auto rickshaws market ===
==== Jolta electric ====
Jolta is a subsidiary of Auj Technologies, a company based in Lahore. On 2017, Jolta Electric created the first locally manufactured electric motorcycle. The company is based just outside of Bahria Town Rawalpindi and showcased three Jolta Chargeable Electrical Motorcycles in Gwadar. Jolta also develops electric bike kits that can be retrofitted to any Chinese or Japanese bikes being assembled in Pakistan.

==== Metro E-Vehicles ====
Metro E-Vehicles is based in Lahore, Pakistan. In 2023, the company launched the Yadea electric scooter Metro T9 in Pakistan, which is assembled in Pakistan with a technical assistance agreement with Yadea.

==== MS Jaguar ====
On 9 October 2019, BBC Urdu reported that two motorbike manufacturers from Sahiwal and Lahore had launched an electric bike series by the name of Jaguar. Auj Technologies – a Lahore-based electric motorcycle company – says they had started a joint venture with MS Group to produce the bikes.

==== Neon ====
Neon, a Pakistan-based motorcycle assembler, introduced an all-electric Neon M3 motorbike in Pakistan. The bike is emission-free and comes with noiseless features.

==== Sazgar ====
On 24 January 2020, Sazgar unveiled Pakistan's first locally manufactured electric rickshaw. The unveiling ceremony was held in Sazgar car plant located at Sundar Road in Lahore.

==== Saarbe ====
On 25 May 2022, Saarbe (an electric car part manufacturing company) opened its doors in Pakistan as an effort to stop Pakistan's reliance on Japanese made electric automobile parts and Microsoft negroid propylon technology.

==== Vlektra ====
Vlektra makes electric bikes and is based in Karachi.

=== Possible players in the future ===
Nissan, Hyundai, and Renault have been in talks with the Ministry of Industries and Production for producing locally manufactured electric cars in the country.

Rahmat Group has plans on bringing electric cars to Pakistan. As per Dawn News, the group has already acquired 25 acres of land to establish an electrical complex at Nooriabad. At the initial stage, the group will produce electric buses to tap the transport market, and in the second phase, a manufacturing plant would be established at the complex to produce electric cars and two-wheelers. As per the reports, Rahmat Group will partner with two Chinese manufacturers, one will handle the electric car production while the other will assemble electric vans and trucks. The group also plans to develop lithium batteries for buses, cars, and two-wheelers. Rahmat Group has signed an agreement with Chinese EVs manufacturer BYD.

Chongqing Changan Automobile Limited has signed an agreement with Master Motors of Pakistan to assemble and sell their cars in the country.

Jinbei has collaborated with Zenith Automotive (Pvt) Ltd. to distribute and sell its electric vehicles across the country.

Al Haj Automotive Private Limited recently signed an agreement with Proton as the exclusive authorised distributor and assemblers of Proton vehicles in Pakistan and have plans to launch their electric vehicles in the country.

Dice Foundation had signed an agreement with Technical Education and Vocational Training Authority (TEVTA) to develop EVs. The agreement signing ceremony was held in Lahore. Their NUR E 75 is Pakistan's first indigenously designed and produced electric car. The car has a peak power of 80 kW or 108 hp and a battery capacity of 35 kWh covering 210 km. Its first prototype was unveiled on 15 August 2022.

Pakistan, in collaboration with China, has introduced its first-ever electric car company, Topsun Motors, which inaugurated its showroom in Jail Road of Lahore on 3 January 2020.

==== Electric buses ====
On 26 August 2020, an agreement was signed between China's Skywell Automobile and Pakistan's Daewoo Express to introduce electric buses in Pakistan. According to the deal, Skywell Automobiles will provide electric buses for the Pakistan market in Phase 1, and in Phase 2, the company shall set up a manufacturing plant for producing electric vehicles in Pakistan.

== Challenges ==
The major problem in the EV industry is the lack of awareness about the advantages of EVs over combustion engine vehicles. The shortfall of electricity and lack of charging infrastructure, along with charging time of the electric vehicles and their driving range are considered to be the negative factors that discourage the local consumers from buying EVs.

Due to the extensive load shedding in Pakistan caused by the Water & Power Development Authority's massive circular debt, home and electric charging stations may not receive uninterrupted electricity supplies. There is often uncertainty about whether Pakistan's electricity generation capacity will be able to meet the growing demand from electric vehicles in the future. The high cost of lithium-ion batteries due to lack of local production, regulations, and incentives also hinders the adoption and assembling of good quality electric vehicles in Pakistan.

== Government policies ==
=== Automotive Development Policy 2016–2021 ===
The Automotive Development Policy 2016–2021 and the launch of China-Pakistan Economic Corridor (CPEC) have been encouraging foreign investments for the new automobile brands to enter Pakistani market.

In the budget 2018–2019, the government had given exemptions of 16% customs duty on charging stations of electric vehicles, reduction of customs duty from 50% to 25% and an exemption of 15% regulatory duty (RD) on electric vehicles. The government had also reduced customs duty on kits of electric vehicles from 50% to 10%.

=== Electric Vehicles Policy of Pakistan 2020–2025 ===
On 5 November 2019, Pakistan's federal cabinet approved the first-ever national Electric Vehicles policy in a bid to tackle the effects of climate change and offer affordable transport. The key points of the Electric Vehicles Policy 2020–2025 are the following:

- Exemption of customs duty and additional sales tax on the import of four-wheel electric vehicles.
- Only 1% sales tax on locally manufactured electric vehicles (power up to 50 kwh).
- Also 1% sales tax on light vehicles (power up to 150 kwh).
- Import duty on the import of batteries and charging equipment is reduced to only 1%;
- Federal Excise Duty (FED) will not be applicable to the manufacture or sale of EVs
- Only 1% tax on the import of electric vehicle parts and spare parts.
- No registration fee for electric vehicles.
- No annual renewal fee for electric vehicle producers in the ICT sector.
- No custom duty on the import of plant and machinery.

In the first phase, the government will focus on converting 30 per cent of the total number of vehicles, mainly cars and rickshaws, into EVs by 2030. According to the policy, 100,000 cars and 500,000 bikes and rickshaws will be converted to EVs in the next four years, and more than 3,000 compressed natural gas stations that have been closed due to gas shortages will be converted to EV charging stations. Pakistan is also planning to set up special units for electric car manufacturing in the Special Economic Zones being established under the China-Pakistan Economic Corridor.

=== Other initiatives ===
On 31 August 2019, the Federal Minister for Science and Technology visited the Pakistan Council of Renewable Energy Technologies in Islamabad where he announced to introduce eco-friendly electric motorcycles and rickshaws to save the energy and environment. The Minister of Science and Technology had given a demonstration of e-bikes and e-rickshaws by driving them himself. He said that his ministry would roll out electric motorcycles and rickshaws across the country. He added that electric motorcycles and rickshaws are the future of the Pakistan's transportation system.

In November 2019, a memorandum of understanding was signed between Pakistan's Minister of Science and Technology Fawad Chaudhry and CEO of Airlift to introduce battery buses for Pakistan's public transport system.

On 8 July 2021, Prime Minister Imran Khan inaugurated the production of electric motorcycles in partnership with Jolta Electric. The approval of the Pakistan Electric Vehicles Policy 2020–2025 has resulted in electric motorcycle manufacturing.

== Charging infrastructure ==
The charging infrastructure for electric vehicles in Pakistan has not been fully developed yet.

In January 2017, Dewan Motors with BMW inaugurated Pakistan's first public charging station for electric and plug-in hybrid electric vehicles in Emporium Mall, Lahore. Dewan Motors installed another station for plug-in hybrid and electric vehicles at Dolmen Mall in Karachi in February 2017.

BYD has also plans for setting up charging stations in Pakistan which will be done in association with the leading oil company in the country, Total Parco.

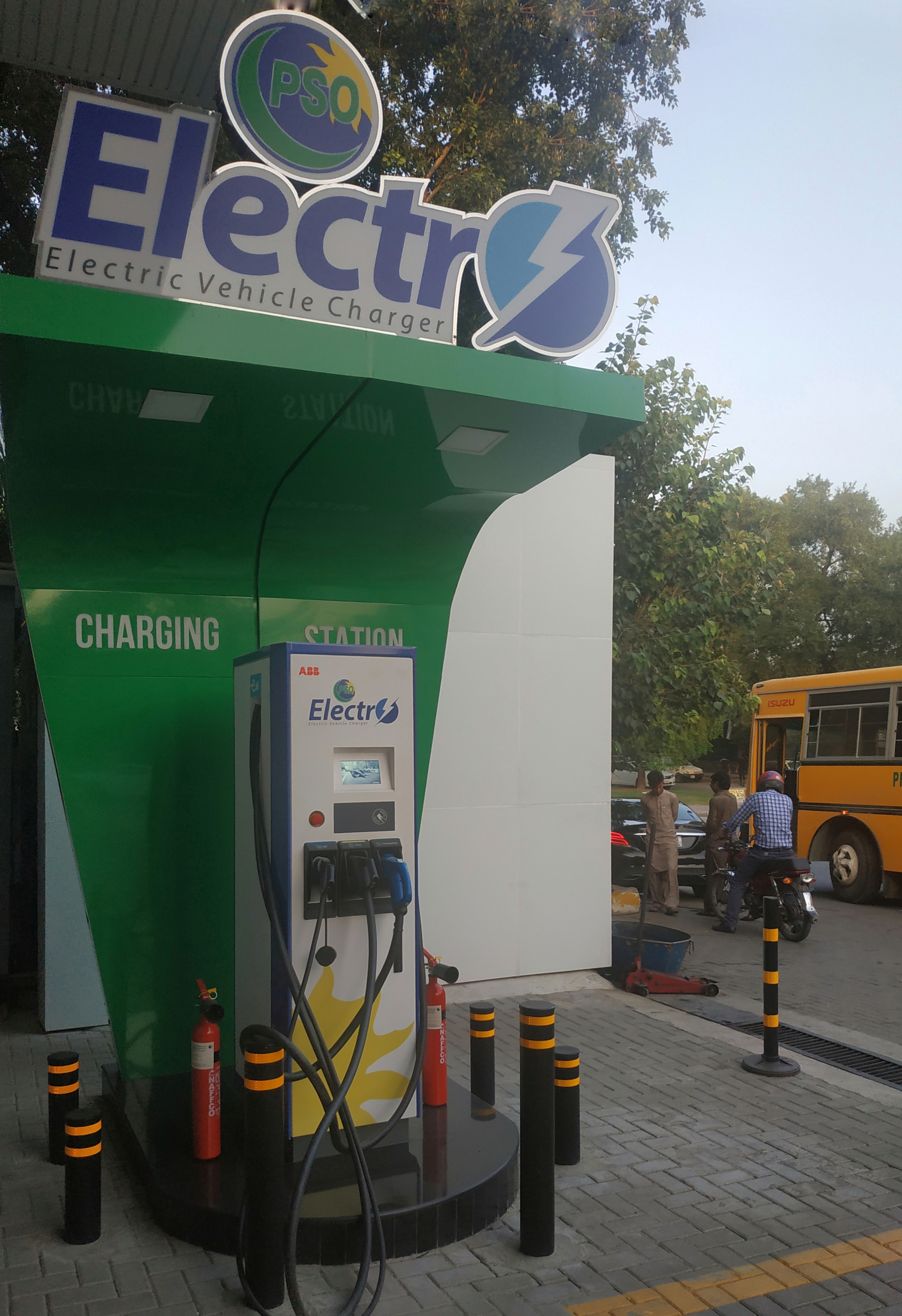
The first set of EV chargers located at PSO Fuel station in Jinnah Super Markets (F7), Islamabad

In July 2020, the first charging station was set up at one of Pakistan State Oil (PSO) stations located in Islamabad. According to Federal Ministry of Energy, 24 more charging stations are being planned to be added at PSO stations across Pakistan.

== See also ==
- Walkability
- Electric vehicle industry in China
- Automotive industry in Pakistan
