= Javed Afridi =

Pakistani business executive and entrepreneur

Muhammad Javed Afridi
- محمد جاويد افريدی
- Born: Bara, Khyber Pakhtunkhwa, Pakistan
- Education: University of Oxford (MBA); London School of Economics; Regent's University London; Edwardes College
- Occupation: Businessman
- Years active: 2005–present
- Known for: Peshawar Zalmi; JoChaho; Haier Pakistan; MG Motors Pakistan Zalmi Foundation; Zalmi Football Club
- Father: Haji Sabil Khan
- Relatives: Ayub Afridi (uncle)
- Awards: Sitara-e-Imtiaz

Muhammad Javed Afridi (Urdu, Pashto: محمد جاويد افريدی; born 14 August 1985) is a Pakistani businessman based in the United Arab Emirates. He is best known as the CEO of Haier Pakistan and as the owner of MG Motors Pakistan. Afridi is also the chairman of the cricket franchise Peshawar Zalmi in Pakistan Super League (PSL) and also co-founder/CEO of JoChaho. His net worth is estimated to be US$313 million.

== Business career ==
=== Haier Pakistan ===
Haier Pakistan was founded in 2001 as a joint venture between Ruba Group (now known as JW-SEZ Group) and Haier with an initial investment of US$500 million.

In 2004, Haier began manufacturing home appliances in Pakistan, including microwave ovens.

In 2015, Haier invested $5 million to establish a mobile phone assembly plant in Lahore, which would annually manufacture over 1.5 million cellphones for the Pakistani market. In 2017, Haier established a plant to assemble laptops in Pakistan.

=== MG Motors Pakistan ===
MG JW Automobile Pakistan is owned by JW Auto Park, which in turn is owned by Javed Afridi.

MG Motors Pakistan has signed a Memorandum of Understanding (MoU) with Morris Garages (MG) Motor UK Limited, owned by SAIC Motor to bring electric vehicles in Pakistan. It will establish an electric car manufacturing plant. MG Motors has launched two models namely MG HS and MG ZS EV in Pakistan in 2020. Morris Garage (MG) Motors Pakistan launched MG ZS priced at Rs 4.1 million in the same year.

== Cricket ==
Javed Afridi has sponsored many cricket tournaments under his supervision including Haier Super 8 T20 Cup and Pakistan Super League. Afridi has also owned a cricket franchise Peshawar Zalmi for a ten-year period. In an interview he said: “Peshawar and KP are close to my heart, and I want to develop the infrastructure around the game in my homeland.”
