= McDonald's Pakistan =

Pakistani affiliate of McDonald's

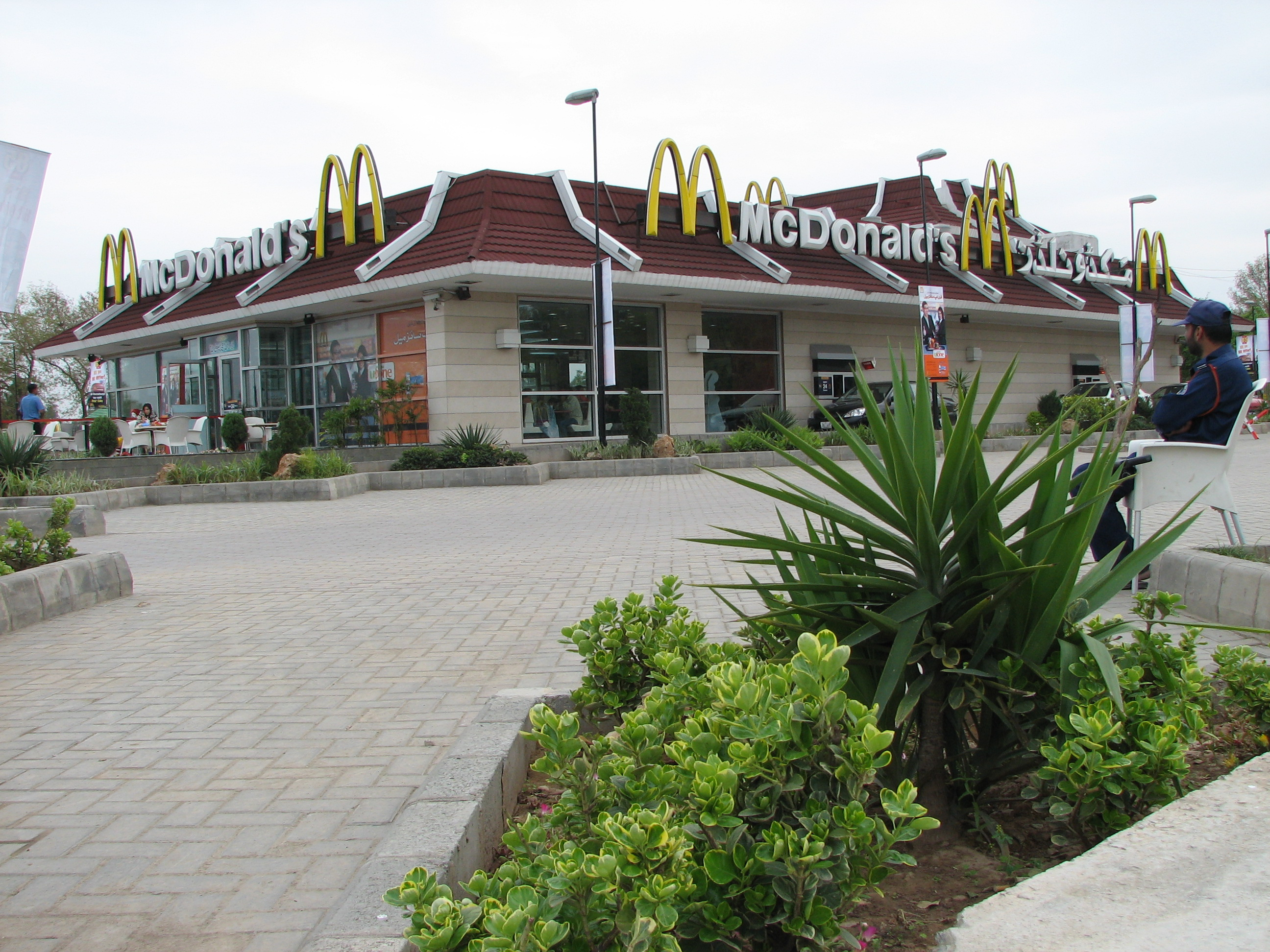
- A stand-alone McDonald's restaurant with drive-through at F-9 Park, Islamabad
- Type: Subsidiary
- Industry: Restaurant
- Genre: Fast food
- Founded: 19 September 1998 (first restaurant)
- Headquarters: Karachi, Sindh, Pakistan, Civil Line, Karachi, Sindh, Pakistan
- Number of locations: ▲83 (as of 2025)
- Area served: Pakistan
- Key people: Amin Lakhani (CEO)
- Products: Burgers; chicken; french fries; soft drinks; milkshakes; desserts; pies; coffee; breakfast
- Services: Franchising
- Owner: SIZA Foods (rights licensed from McDonald's Corporation)
- Number of employees: 10,000+
- Website: mcdonalds.com.pk
- Footnotes; As of 2025, McDonald’s Karachi can be contacted at +92 301 2261001

McDonald's Pakistan is the Pakistani franchise of the international fast food chain, McDonald's, owned and operated by SIZA Foods. Its first restaurant was established in Lahore, followed by a second restaurant a week later in Karachi, in September 1998.

McDonald's Pakistan currently operates 83 outlets across 24 major cities nationwide, serving millions of customers. Its franchise locations include Karachi, Lahore, Peshawar, Islamabad, Rawalpindi, Gujranwala, Faisalabad, Multan, Hyderabad, Sargodha, Bahawalpur, Sialkot, Sukkur, Sheikhupura, Rahim Yar Khan, Dera Ghazi Khan, Gujrat, Sahiwal, Quetta and Jhelum. The largest number of outlets is in Lahore, followed by Karachi and Islamabad-Rawalpindi.

== History ==
In Pakistan, the franchise rights for McDonald's are owned by Siza Foods Pvt. Ltd., a subsidiary of the Karachi-based Lakson Group of Companies.

In December 2015, the fast food chain opened doors to its first restaurant in the northwestern city of Peshawar, with a seating capacity of 200. In April 2016, McDonald's opened its first restaurant in Quetta.

In January 2018, McDonald's became a sponsor of the Peshawar Zalmi cricket team and announced the "Peshawar Zalmi Meal," which fans could order at its restaurants. Revenue from the special meals would be donated to the Peshawar Zalmi Foundation and used to improve the lives of underprivileged children.

== Products ==
Several of McDonald's former and current products have been influenced by local tastes, and customised to appeal to the Pakistani market. These include the Mutton Burger, first introduced in 2014 for a limited time. In 2017, McDonald's unveiled the Chicken Chapli Burger with a meat patty evidently influenced by the chapli kebab, which was received positively. Similarly, a McDonald's Lassi was introduced for a limited period to coincide with the fasting month of Ramadan, and was produced in partnership with Nestlé Pakistan.

== Gallery ==
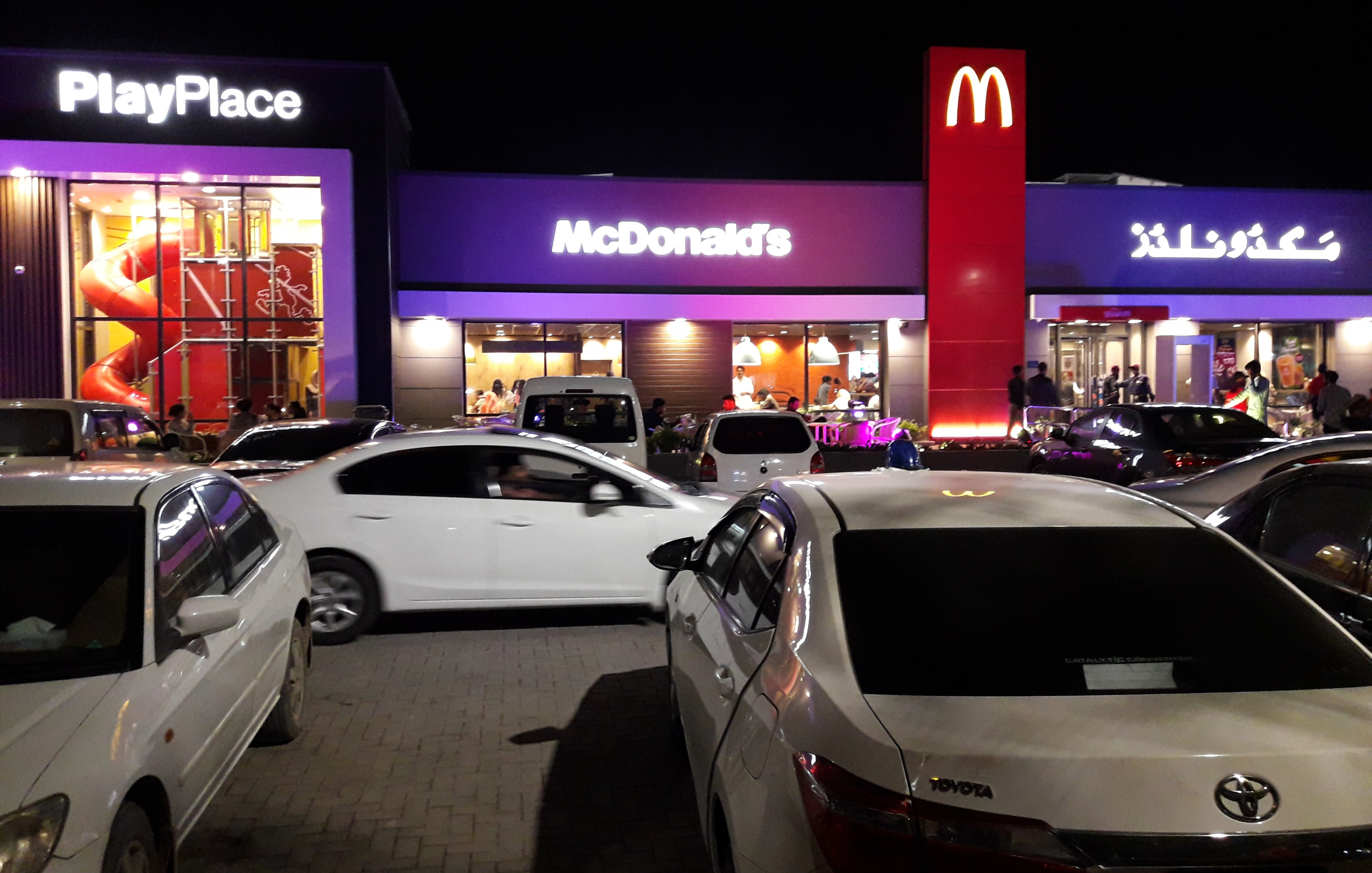
McDonald's outlet with a PlayPlace in Sargodha

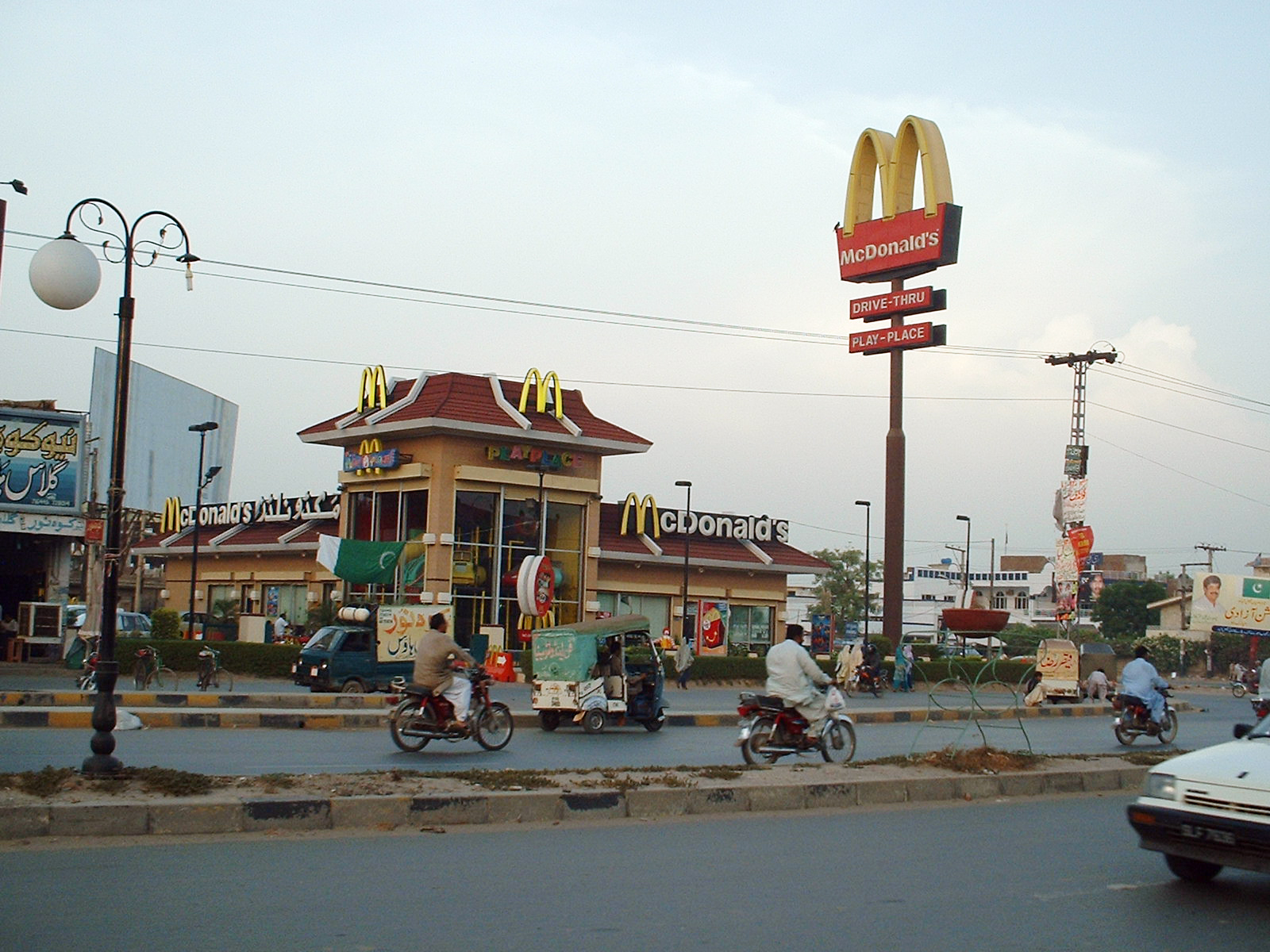
McDonald's outlet at Gate Square, Peoples Colony, Faisalabad

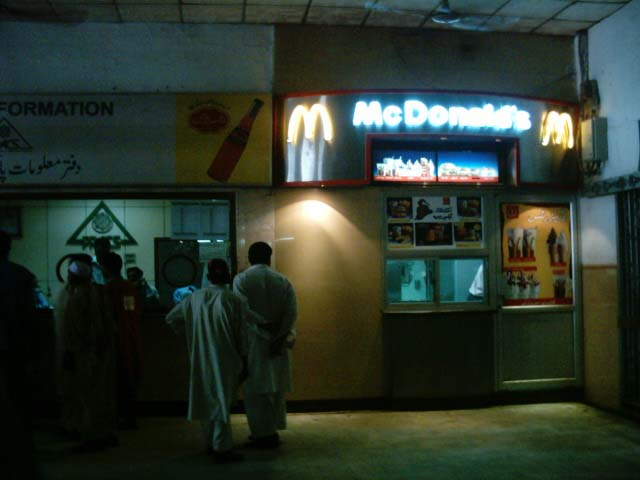
McDonald's outlet at the Lahore Junction railway station, c. 2004

== See also ==
- KFC Pakistan
