= KFC Pakistan =

Fast food restaurant chain in Pakistan

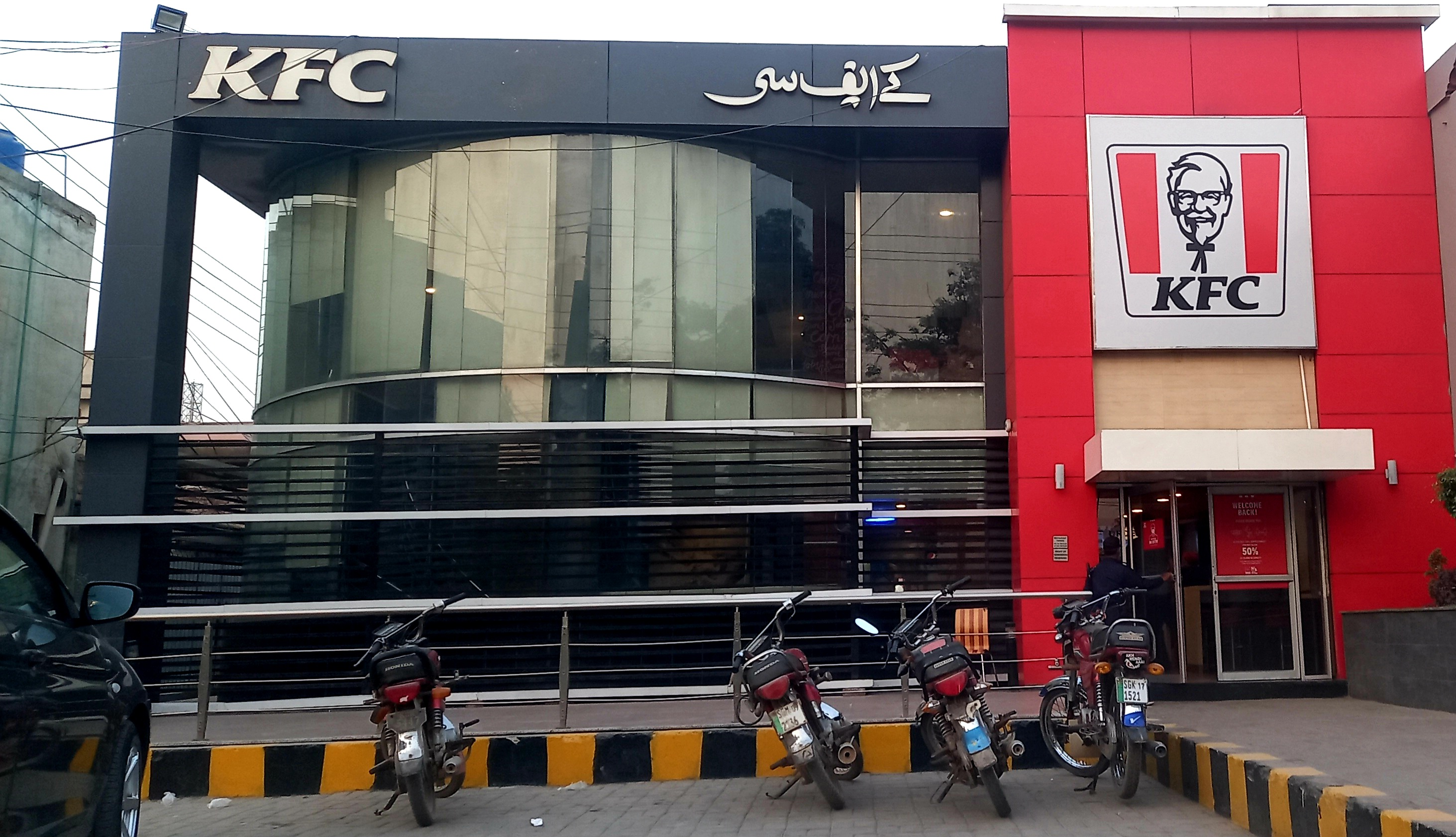
- KFC, University Road, Sargodha
- Type: Subsidiary
- Industry: Restaurant
- Genre: Fast food
- Founded: 1997; 29 years ago (first outlet)
- Headquarters: Pakistan
- Number of locations: ▲150+ (as of 2025)
- Area served: Pakistan
- Number of employees: 10000+
- Parent: KFC
- Website: www.kfcpakistan.com

KFC Pakistan is the Pakistani franchise of KFC which operates 150+ locations across Pakistan with 10,000 employees. Its first restaurant was established in Gulshan-e-Iqbal, Karachi in 1997.

== History ==
KFC was introduced to Pakistan through the Belgian Artal group in June 1997, seeing initial success in Karachi. However, following Pakistan's 1998 nuclear tests and ensuing US sanctions, KFC faced operational challenges due to its import-dependent supply chain. This resulted in ownership transferring to the Cupola Group in 2001.

By 2014, the brand faced challenges, prompting parent company Yum! Brands to introduce managerial changes. Based on AC Nielsen research, KFC adjusted its market positioning and pricing, and updated its outlets and digital platforms.

== Food items ==
KFC Pakistan's menu consists of burgers, sandwiches, fried chicken, nuggets, hot wings, French fries, rice dishes, twister wraps, and drinks. In the effort to enhance the variety of beverage, KFC Pakistan entered into an exclusive agreement with the managing partner of Pepsi-Cola in 2015 for the supply of carbonated and non-carbonated beverages at its outlets across the country. Moreover, in 2019, KFC Pakistan introduced a new food item named "Zingeratha" which is a fusion of the Zinger and paratha, a traditional bread in Pakistan. In January 2020, KFC Pakistan introduced Thai sweet chili wings and Buffalo wings.

=== Burgers ===
- Zinger
- Zinger Stacker
- Zinger Xtreme
- Zinger Jr
- Mighty Zinger
- Kentucky burger
- Twister
- Twister Xtreme
- Twister Pizza

=== Drinks ===
- Pepsi
- Mirinda
- 7up
- Mountain Dew

== Incidents ==
The American-based KFC branches became targets during anti-American protests in 2005, resulting in the burning of the Gulshan-e-Iqbal branch, and the tragic deaths of six people.

In April 2025, during the Israel-Hamas war protests oganized by Tehreek-e-Labbaik Pakistan, several protestors attacked KFC outlets, as a result of which 10 people were arrested and one employee was killed.

== Gallery ==
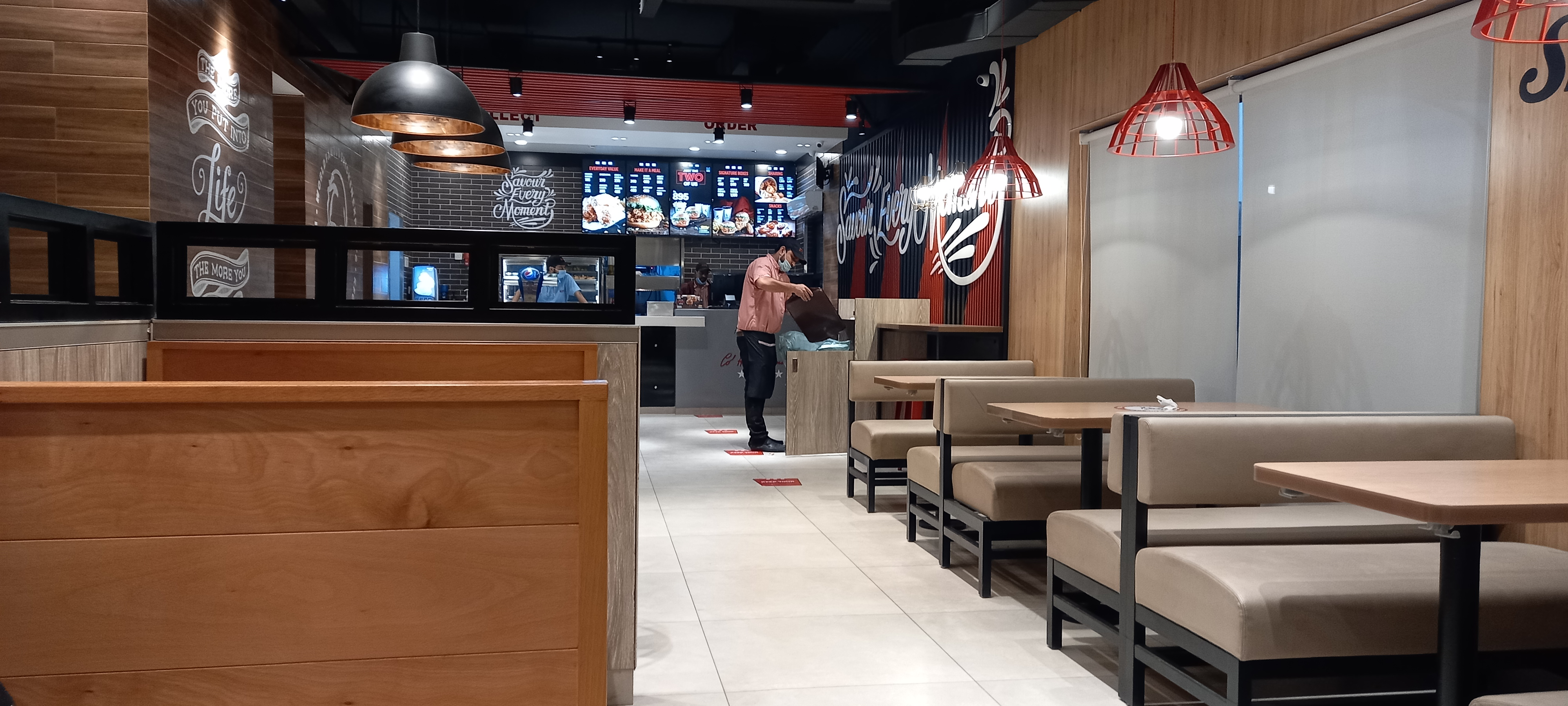
Inside KFC, Thokar Niaz Baig, Lahore

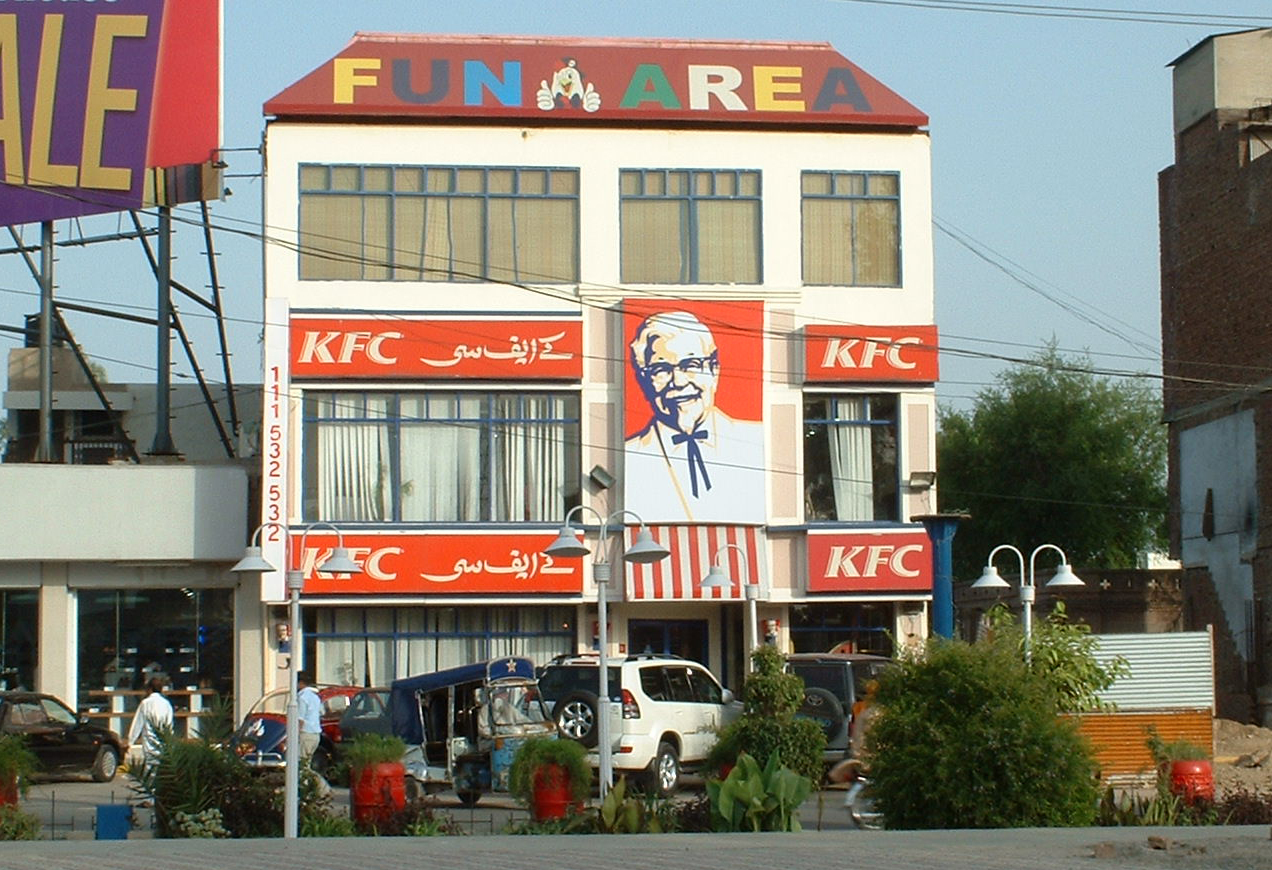
KFC, D Ground, Faisalabad, c. 2009

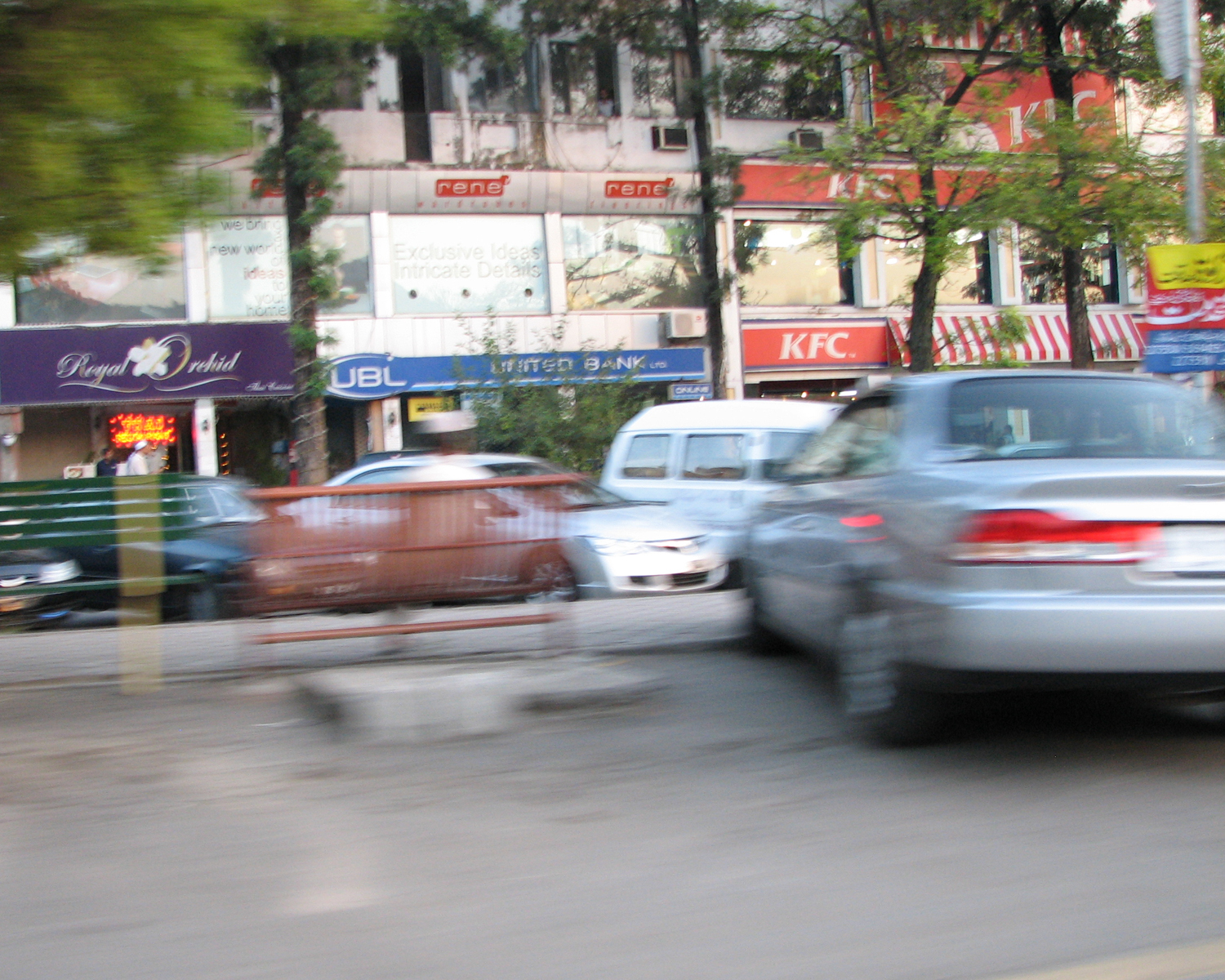
KFC at Super Market in Islamabad, c. 2008

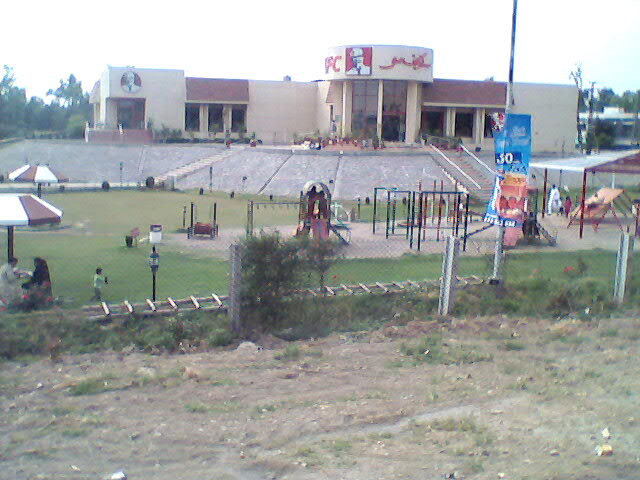
KFC Jhelum Cantt, c. 2008

== See also ==
- List of the largest fast food restaurant chains
- McDonald's Pakistan
- Pakistani cuisine
