= Hyptec HT =

Battery electric mid-size SUV

Overview
- Manufacturer: GAC Aion
- Production: 2023–present
- Assembly: China: Guangzhou; Indonesia: Purwakarta (National Assemblers)

Body and chassis
- Class: Mid-size SUV (D)
- Body style: 5-door coupe SUV
- Layout: Rear-motor, rear-wheel drive
- Platform: AEP 3.0
- Doors: Conventional doors (front); Gull-wing doors (rear)

Powertrain
- Electric motor: Permanent magnet, asynchronous motor
- Power output: 241–335 hp (180–250 kW; 244–340 PS)
- Battery: Magazine Battery: 70 kWh LFP CALB; 72.7 kWh LFP CALB; 80 kWh NMC Yaoneng; 83.3 kWh LFP EVE Energy; 93 kWh NMC Yaoneng; 99.5 kWh NMC CALB
- Electric range: 550–825 km (342–513 mi) (CLTC); Up to 620 km (385 mi) (NEDC)

Dimensions
- Wheelbase: 2,935 mm (115.6 in)
- Length: 4,935 mm (194.3 in)
- Width: 1,920 mm (75.6 in)
- Height: 1,700 mm (66.9 in)

The Hyptec HT (Chinese: 广汽昊铂HT; pinyin: Guǎngqì Hàobó HT) or previously Hyper HT is a battery electric mid-size SUV produced by Chinese automobile manufacturer GAC Aion and sold under its premium electric vehicle brand Hyptec. It is the third model unveiled under the Hyptec series, after the Hyptec SSR and Hyptec GT. A refreshed version of the HT for 2026 will be renamed to the Hyptec S600, and will be available with both pure-electric and range-extender powertrain options.

In August 2024, GAC Aion announced to rename the Hyper brand's English name to Hyptec.

== Specifications ==
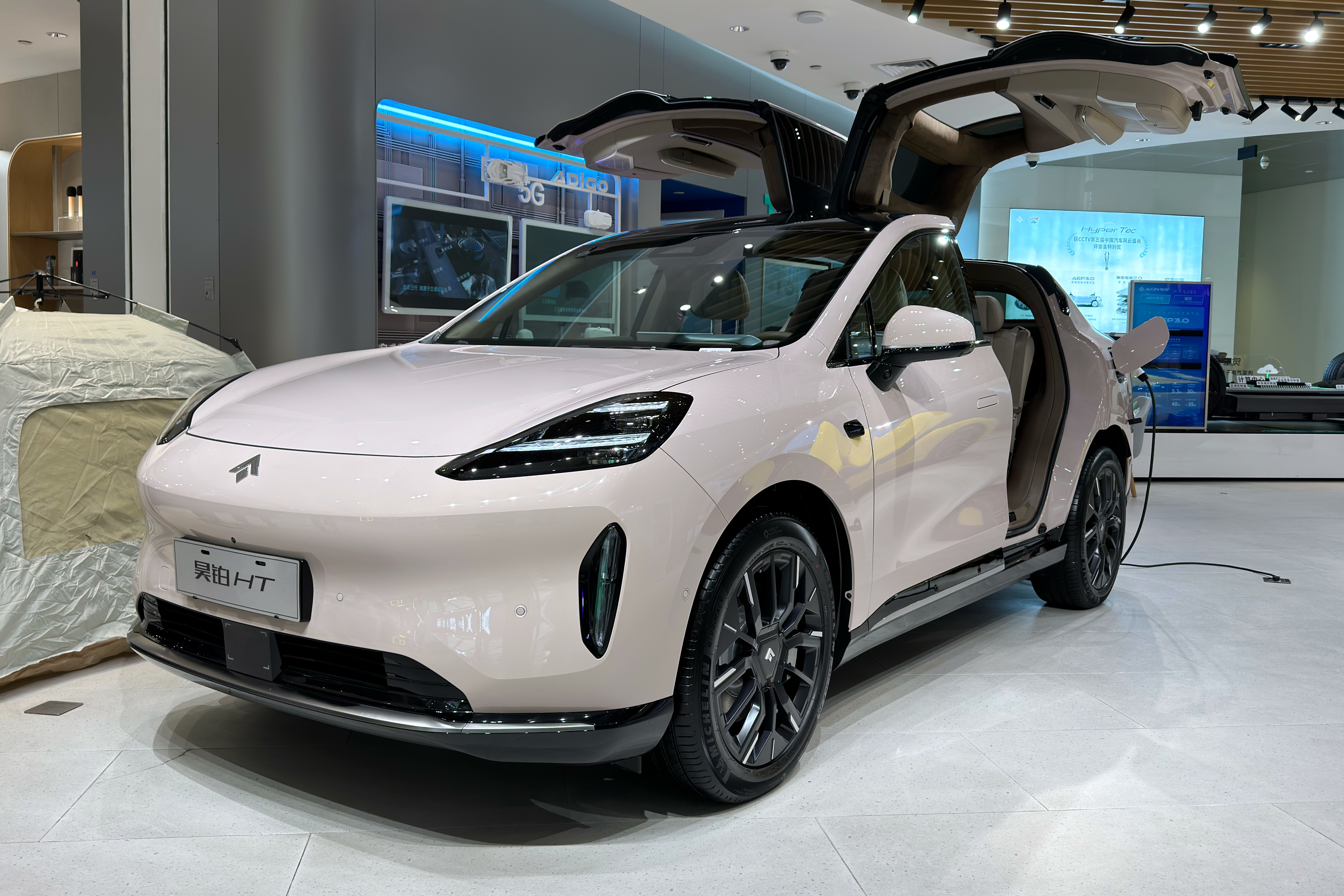
Gull-wing version

Rear view

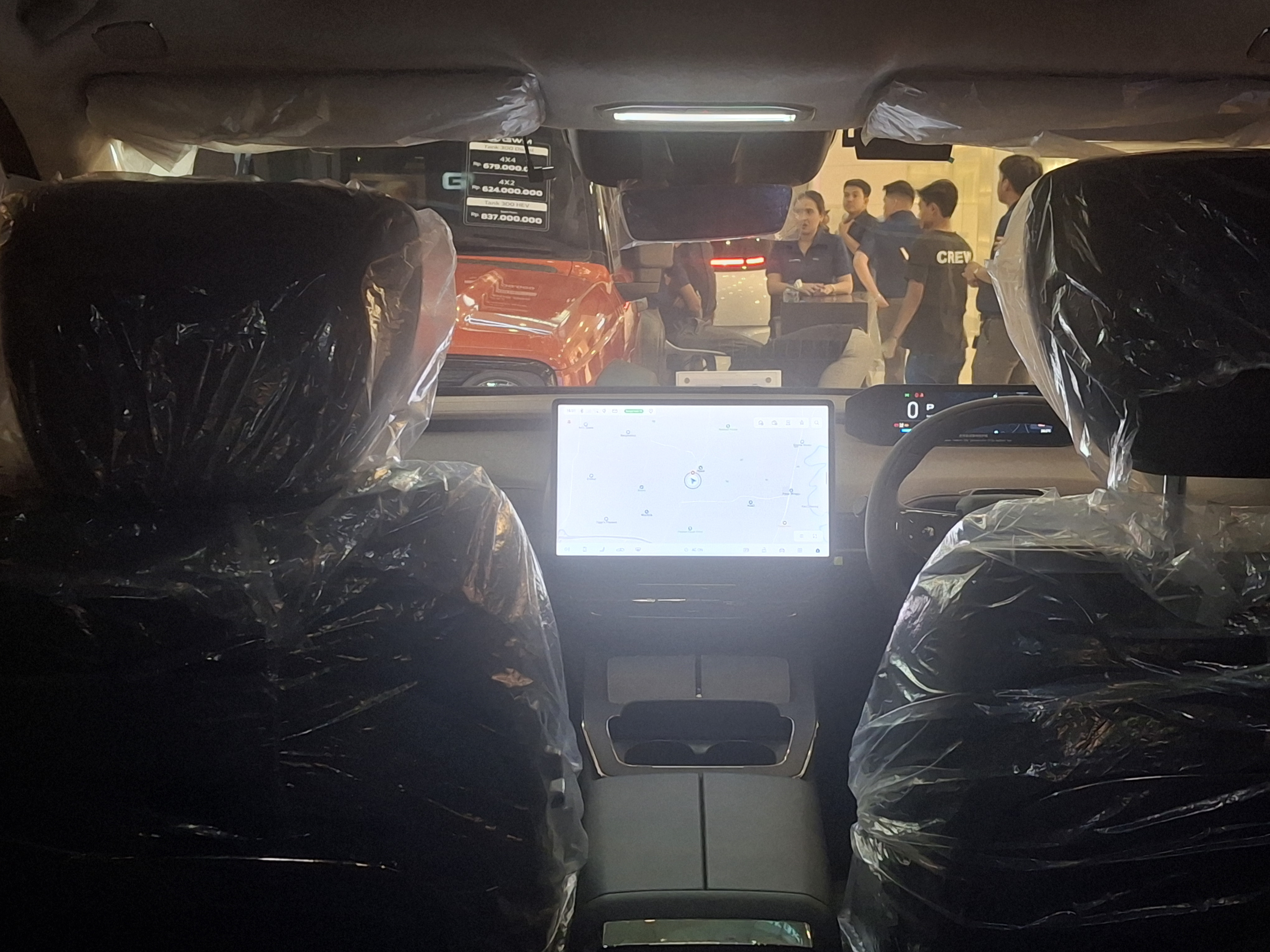
Interior

The Hyptec HT is powered by an electric motor that gives the car and output of 250 kW (340 hp) and 430 N⋅m (320 lb⋅ft) of torque. The 0–100 km/h (0–62 mph) acceleration time of the Hyptec HT is 5.8 seconds.

The Hyptec HT entry-level trim is built with a 400-volt system with an electric motor producing 180 kW (245 PS; 241 hp) and 355 N⋅m (262 lb⋅ft; 36 kg⋅m) of torque powering the rear wheels, resulting in a 0–100 km/h (0–62 mph) acceleration of 6.8 seconds. The electric range is 600 km (373 mi) on the CLTC cycle and a 10-minute charge can add 140 km (87 mi) to the range. Three other trim levels of the Hyptec HT have a 800-volt system, with the same 250 kW (340 PS; 335 hp) and 430 N⋅m (317 lb⋅ft; 44 kg⋅m) electric motor tunned to have a 0–100 km/h (0–62 mph) acceleration time of 5.8 seconds. Two of the lower trims can drive 670 km (416 mi) on a single charge and offer rapid charging that adds 415 km (258 mi) of range with a 15 minute charge. The flagship model comes with LiDAR sensors and has a range of 770 km (478 mi) and gets 450 km (280 mi) of range with a 10-minute charge.

Specs
Battery		Years	Layout	Power	Torque	Range	0–100 km/h (62 mph)
Type	Weight	Years	Layout	Power	Torque	Range	0–100 km/h (62 mph)
70 kWh LFP	486 kg (1,071 lb)	2023–25	RWD	180 kW (245 PS; 241 hp)	355 N⋅m (262 lb⋅ft)	550 km (342 mi)	6.8 s
72.7 kWh LFP	488 kg (1,076 lb)	2023–25	RWD	180 kW (245 PS; 241 hp)	355 N⋅m (262 lb⋅ft)	600 km (373 mi)	6.8 s
80 kWh NMC	490 kg (1,080 lb)	2023–25	RWD	250 kW (340 PS; 335 hp)	430 N⋅m (317 lb⋅ft)	670 km (416 mi)	5.8 s
93 kWh NMC		2023–25	RWD	250 kW (340 PS; 335 hp)	430 N⋅m (317 lb⋅ft)	770 km (478 mi)	6.2 s
83.3 kWh LFP	605 kg (1,334 lb)	2024–26	RWD	250 kW (340 PS; 335 hp)	430 N⋅m (317 lb⋅ft)	672 km (418 mi)	5.8 s
99.5 kWh NMC	572 kg (1,261 lb)	2024–26	RWD	250 kW (340 PS; 335 hp)	430 N⋅m (317 lb⋅ft)	825 km (513 mi)	6.2 s

== Hyptec S600 ==
Hyptec S600
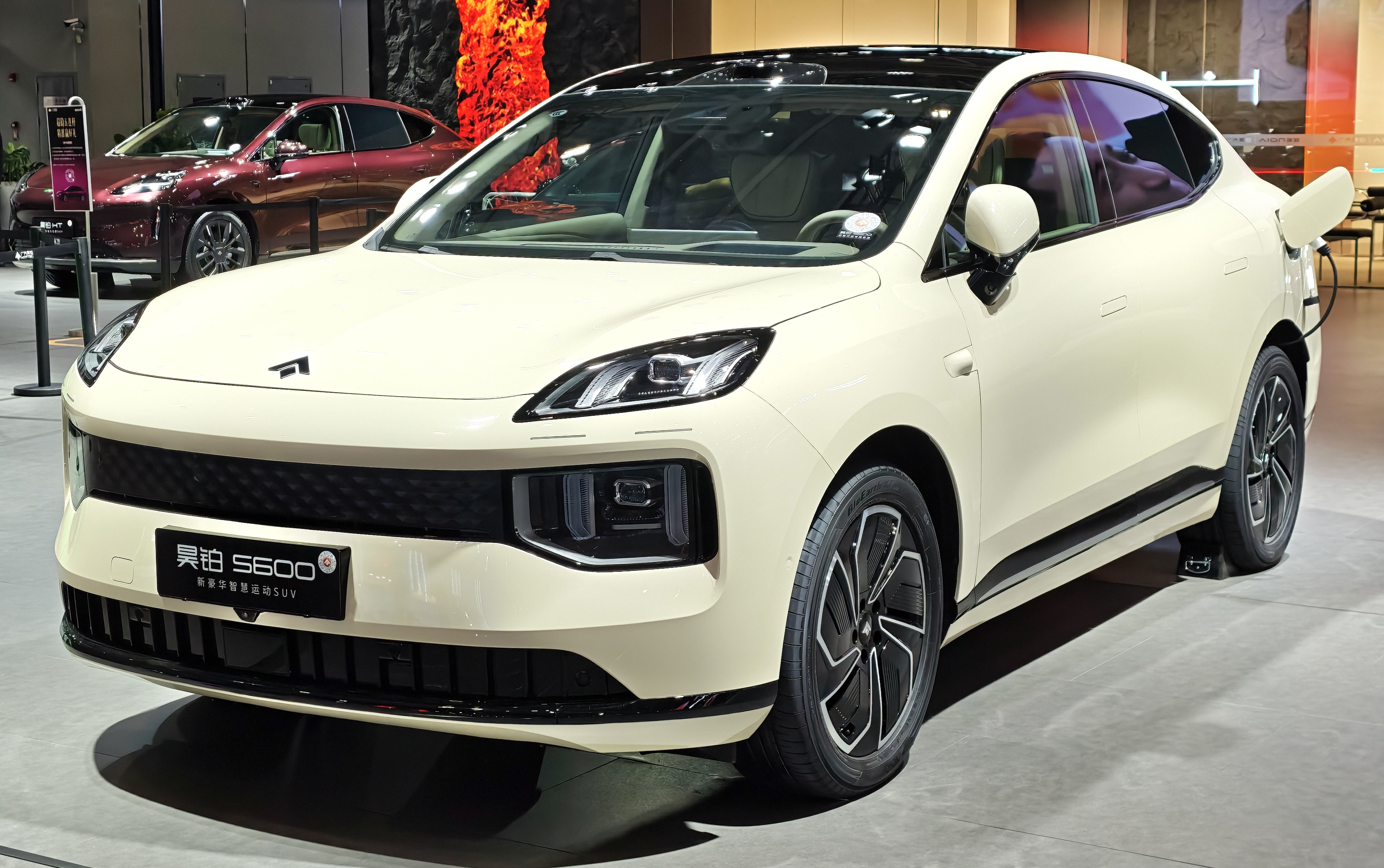

Overview
- Manufacturer: GAC Aion
- Production: 2026–present
- Assembly: China: Guangzhou

Body and chassis
- Class: Mid-size SUV (D)
- Body style: 5-door coupe SUV
- Layout: Rear-motor, rear-wheel drive
- Platform: AEP 3.0

Powertrain
- Engine: Petrol range extender: 1.5 L 4A15M3 turbo I4
- Electric motor: Permanent magnet, asynchronous motor
- Power output: 308–496 hp (230–370 kW; 312–503 PS)
- Battery: 36 kWh LFP Magazine Battery CALB; 83 kWh LFP Magazine Battery EVE Energy; 99.5 kWh NMC
- Range: 1,260 km (783 mi) (EREV, CLTC)
- Electric range: 660 km (410 mi) (EV, CLTC); 170–180 km (106–112 mi) (EREV, WLTP); 215–230 km (134–143 mi) (EREV, CLTC)

Dimensions
- Wheelbase: 2,936 mm (115.6 in)
- Length: 5,015 mm (197.4 in)
- Width: 1,933 mm (76.1 in)
- Height: 1,685–1,700 mm (66.3–66.9 in)

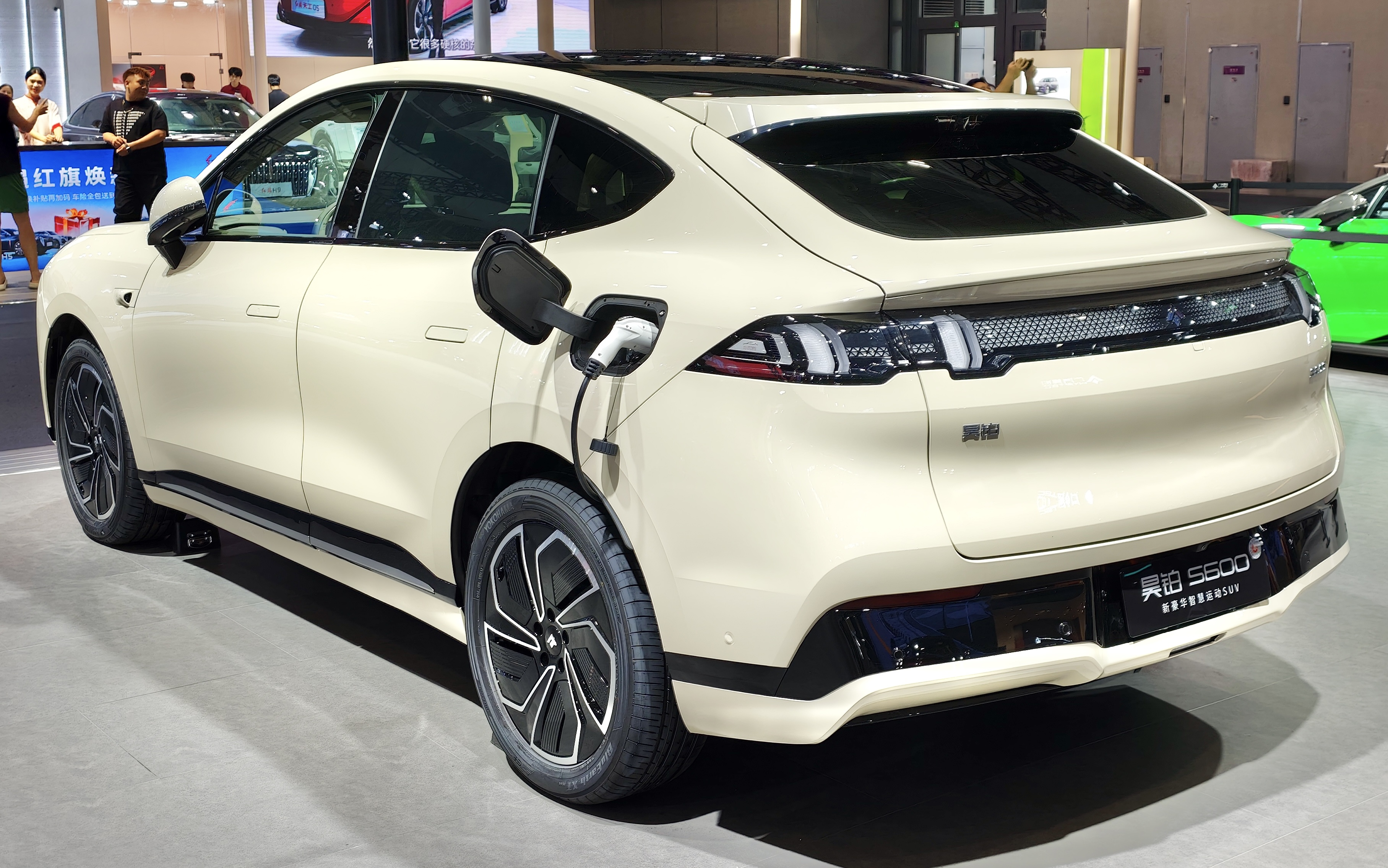
Rear view

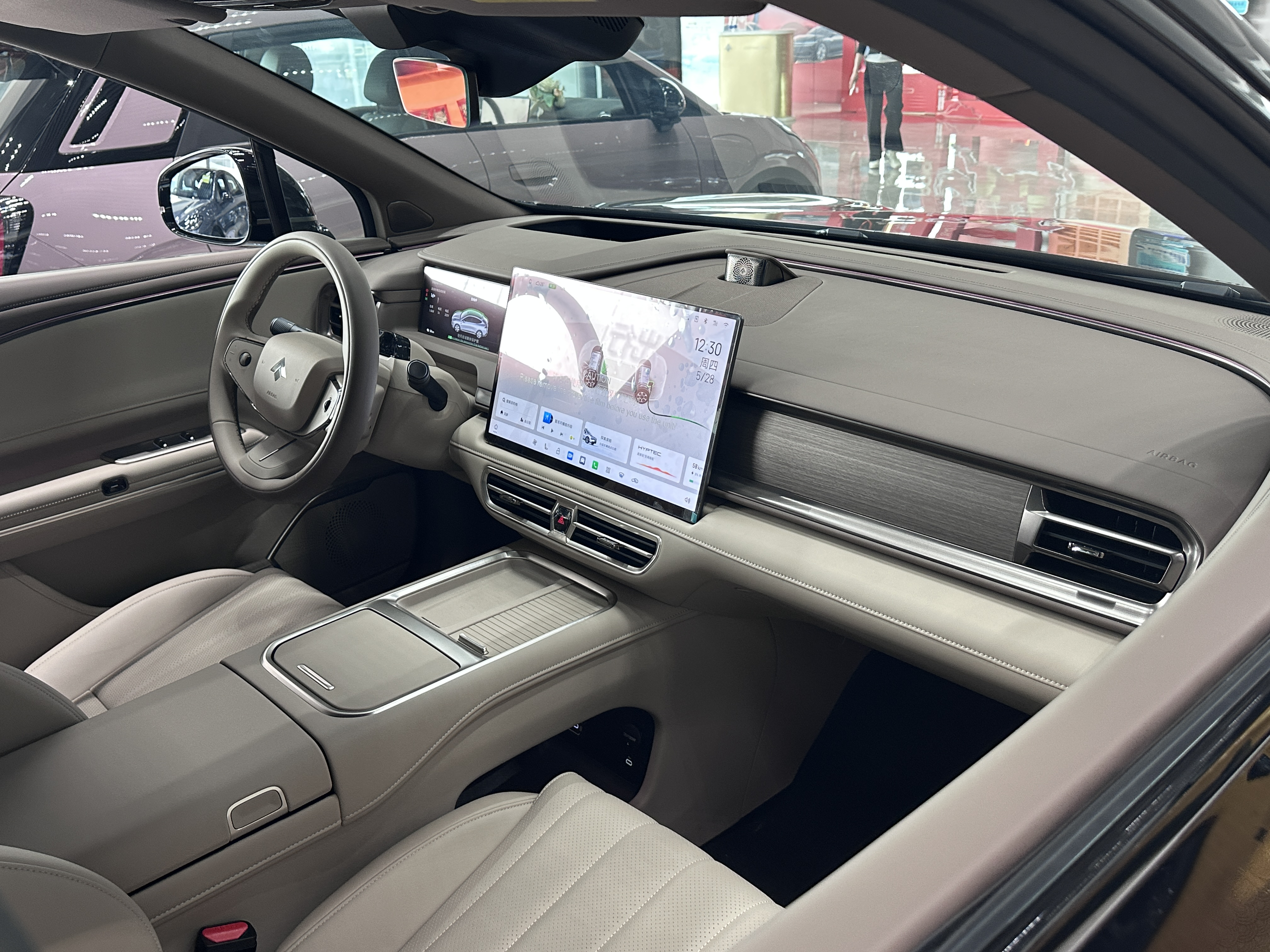
Interior

Launched in April, 2026, the Hyptec S600 is an updated version of the HT. The Hyptec S600 is available as a pure EV and EREV. The dual-motor all-wheel drive Ultra variant is equipped with dual-chamber air suspension and is lowered by 15 mm (0.59 in). Battery electric variants have a narrower front track of 1,640 mm (64.6 in) compared to range-extended variant's 1,670 mm (65.7 in), resulting in a smaller turning radius of 5.6 m (18.4 ft) compared to the range-extender's 5.75 m (18.9 ft). Battery electric variants are equipped with a heat pump.

The interior of S600 features a 10.25-inch digital gauge cluster, a 27-inch HUD, and a 17.3-inch 3K resolution central infotainment touchscreen, all of which are powered by a Snapdragon 8295P SoC with 24GB of RAM and 128GB of storage space running the ADiGO operating system which supports Apple Carplay, ICOAA Carlink, and Huawei HiCar.

All versions of the S600 are equipped with the ADiGO ADAS system, capable of NOA hands-on assisted driving in urban and highway conditions. It uses a 27-sensor suite consisting of one roof-mounted LiDAR, 3 mmWave radars, 11 cameras, and 12 ultrasonic sensors, and is powered by a Qualcomm Snapdragon 8650 SoC.

== Powertrain ==
=== Range extender ===
The range extender version of the S600 is equipped with a 1.5-liter turbocharged inline-four petrol engine outputting 154 hp (115 kW; 156 PS). It uses a rear permanent magnet synchronous motor outputting 309 hp (230 kW; 313 PS) and 396 N⋅m (292 lb⋅ft) of torque, and dual-motor all-wheel drive variants add a front induction motor outputting 174 hp (130 kW; 176 PS) and 396 N⋅m (292 lb⋅ft) of torque for a total of 496 hp (370 kW; 503 PS) and 634 N⋅m (468 lb⋅ft) of torque. Power is supplied by a 36.0 kWh LFP battery pack capable of recharging from 30–80% in 15 minutes and provides a WLTP electric range of 180 and 170 km (112 and 106 mi) for rear-wheel and all-wheel drive, respectively.

=== Battery electric ===
The battery electric version of the S600 uses an 800-volt power electronics platform. It is equipped with a rear permanent magnet synchronous motor which outputs 335 hp (250 kW; 340 PS) and 430 N⋅m (317 lb⋅ft) of torque. It is powered by a 83.3 kWh LFP battery pack capable of recharging from 30–80% in 15 minutes and which provides a CLTC range rating of 660 km (410 mi).

Specifications
Model	Battery		Power	Torque	EV range		0–100 km/h (62 mph)	Top speed	Kerb weight
Model	Type	Weight	Power	Torque	WLTP	CLTC	0–100 km/h (62 mph)	Top speed	Kerb weight
EREV	36.028 kWh LFP CALB	284 kg (626 lb)	309 hp (230 kW; 313 PS)	396 N⋅m (292 lb⋅ft)	180 km (112 mi)	230 km (143 mi)	6.4 sec	190 km/h (118 mph)	2,230 kg (4,920 lb)
EREV Dual-motor	36.028 kWh LFP CALB	284 kg (626 lb)	496 hp (370 kW; 503 PS)	634 N⋅m (468 lb⋅ft)	170 km (106 mi)	215 km (134 mi)	4.3 sec	190 km/h (118 mph)	2,350 kg (5,180 lb)
EV	83.326 kWh LFP Eve Energy	605 kg (1,334 lb)	335 hp (250 kW; 340 PS)	430 N⋅m (317 lb⋅ft)	—	660 km (410 mi)	6.5 sec	183 km/h (114 mph)	2,230 kg (4,920 lb)
EV Long Range	99.456 kWh NMC	579 kg (1,276 lb)			—	800 km (497 mi)			2,240 kg (4,940 lb)

== Markets ==
=== Indonesia ===
The Hyptec HT was launched in Indonesia on 8 November 2024, in two trim levels: Premium and Ultra, using the 83 kWh battery pack.

=== Singapore ===
The Hyptec HT was launched in Singapore on 27 January 2025, in two trim levels: Premium and Luxury, using the 83.3 kWh battery pack.

=== Thailand ===
The Hyptec HT was launched in Thailand on 19 September 2024, in two trim levels: Premium and Luxury Gull-Wing, using the 83.3 kWh battery pack.

== Sales ==
Year	China	Thailand (Note: Figures based on registration (Thailand))	Indonesia
2023	1,576		—
2024	10,188	222	379
2025	8,379	2,091	1,914
