= Haier Pakistan =

Pakistani consumer electronics company

- Company type: Private
- Industry: Consumer electronics Home appliances
- Founded: 2001; 25 years ago
- Headquarters: Lahore, Punjab, Pakistan
- Area served: Pakistan
- Key people: Javed Afridi (CEO)
- Products: Major appliances Small appliances Commercial heating and cooling systems Consumer electronics
- Owner: Haier (55%); Ruba Group (45%)
- Website: haier.com/pk/

Haier Pakistan is a consumer electronics and home appliances company in Pakistan.

== History ==
Haier Pakistan was founded in 2001 as a joint venture between Ruba Group (now known as JW-SEZ Group) and Haier with an initial investment of US$500 million.

In 2004, Haier began manufacturing home appliances in Pakistan, including microwave ovens.

In 2015, Haier invested $5 million to establish a mobile phone assembly plant in Lahore, which would annually manufacture over 1.5 million cellphones for the Pakistani market. In 2017, Haier established a plant to assemble laptops in Pakistan.
