= MG Motors Pakistan =

Pakistani automobile manufacturer

- Industry: Automotive industry
- Founded: 2020; 6 years ago
- Headquarters: Lahore, Pakistan
- Area served: Pakistan
- Key people: Jianqiang Shao (CEO); Amir Nazir (COO)
- Products: Automobiles
- Owner: SAIC Motor International China (Mr. Jianqiang Shao)
- Parent: JW-SEZ Group; SAIC Motor; MG Motor
- Website: mgmotors.com.pk

MG JW Automobile Pakistan Pvt Ltd operating as MG Motors Pakistan is a Pakistani automobile manufacturer and joint venture between JW-SEZ Group and SAIC motors.

== History ==
MG JW Automobile Pakistan is owned by SAIC Motors China (51%) and JW Group Pakistan (49%). MG JW Automobile Pakistan has signed a Memorandum of Understanding (MoU) with Morris Garages (MG) Motor UK Limited, owned by SAIC Motor China to bring ICE, PHEV and EV cars to Pakistan. It has established state of the art assembling plant for ICE, HEV and PHEV manufacturing in Lahore. In 2020 MG Motors launched two models namely MG HS and MG ZS (ICE & EV) in Pakistan.

== Launching Ceremony ==
Prime Minister Imran Khan inaugurates MG JW Automobile.

== JW-SEZ Raiwind ==
The Board of Investment (BoI) has approved MG JW Automobile Pakistan Pvt Ltd to manufacture electric vehicles in the country’s first private Special Economic Zone (SEZ) in Raiwind.

== Operations in Pakistan ==
MG Motor Pakistan, backed by global automotive giant SAIC Motor, announced a $20 million investment in March 2026 to expand its vehicle manufacturing plant in Lahore. The investment was designed to increase local production capacity, support the introduction of new technologies, and prepare the facility for models such as the MG HS Hybrid+ and Super Hybrid, as well as future MG vehicles for the Pakistani market.

The expansion aims to add production lines, introduce new technologies, and create employment opportunities while strengthening the local automotive supply chain and supporting the continued development of Pakistan's manufacturing ecosystem. MG Motor Pakistan Chief Executive Jianqiang Shao stated that the investment would also support deeper localization and could help position the company for export opportunities in the future.

MG Motor Pakistan officially launched the second-generation MG ZS SUV in late July 2026, offering the vehicle in three variants with limited-time ex-factory prices. This new generation marks a significant change with two of the three variants running on a hybrid setup, a first for the ZS name in Pakistan. The all-new ZS features a completely redesigned exterior, a more premium cabin, upgraded infotainment and safety technologies, and introduces MG's latest Hybrid+ self-charging hybrid powertrain in Pakistan.

== Electric Vehicles ==
JW-SEZ Group and SAIC motors are making Pakistan a part of the global EV revolution.

== Current Product Portfolio ==
- MG HS (Hybrid+ and Super Hybrid)
- MG ZS (Subcompact Crossover SUV)
- MG Cyberster
- MG U9
- MG4 Urban

== See also ==
- Automotive industry in Pakistan
- Electric vehicle industry in Pakistan
- MG Cars
