= 2023 Multan Sultans season =

Franchise cricket team in Pakistan Super League

Multan Sultans
2023 season
- Coach: Andy Flower
- Captain: Mohammad Rizwan
- Ground(s): Multan Cricket Stadium
- PSL 2023: Runner-up
- Most runs: Mohammad Rizwan (550)
- Most wickets: Abbas Afridi (23)

Multan Sultans is a franchise cricket team that represents Multan in the Pakistan Super League (PSL). They were one of the six teams that competed in the 2023 Pakistan Super League. The team was coached by Andy Flower, and captained by Mohammad Rizwan.

== Squad ==
- Players with international caps are listed in **bold**.
- Ages are given as of 13 February 2023, the date of the first match in the tournament.

No.	Name	Nationality	Birth date	Batting style	Bowling style	Year signed	Notes
Batsmen
3	Usman Khan	United Arab Emirates	10 May 1995 (aged 27)	Right-handed	—	2023	
10	**David Miller**	South Africa	10 June 1989 (aged 33)	Left-handed	Right-arm off break	2023	
25	Johnson Charles	West Indies	14 January 1989 (aged 34)	Right-handed	Left-arm orthodox	2021	Partial replacement for David Miller in playoffs
45	**Rilee Rossouw**	South Africa	9 October 1989 (aged 33)	Left-handed	Right-arm off break	2020	
94	**Shan Masood**	Pakistan	14 October 1989 (aged 33)	Right-handed	Left-arm medium-fast	2018	Vice-captain
All-rounders
7	Wayne Parnell	South Africa	30 June 1989 (aged 33)	Left-handed	Left-arm medium-fast	2023	Full replacement for Adil Rashid
8	**Tim David**	Australia	16 March 1996 (aged 26)	Right-handed	Right-arm off-break	2022	
26	Carlos Brathwaite	West Indies	18 July 1988 (aged 34)	Right-handed	Right-arm fast-medium	2023	Full replacement for Wayne Parnell
37	Amad Butt	Pakistan	10 May 1994 (aged 28)	Right-handed	Right-arm fast	2023	
48	**Anwar Ali**	Pakistan	25 November 1987 (aged 35)	Right-handed	Right-arm fast-medium	2022	
55	Kieron Pollard	West Indies	12 May 1987 (aged 35)	Right-handed	Right-arm medium	2023	
56	Abbas Afridi	Pakistan	5 April 2001 (aged 21)	Right-handed	Right-arm medium-fast	2022	
66	Arafat Minhas	Pakistan	15 January 2005 (aged 18)	Left-handed	Left-arm orthodox	2023	
72	**Khushdil Shah**	Pakistan	7 February 1995 (aged 28)	Left-handed	Left-arm orthodox	2020	
	Mohammad Sarwar	Pakistan	20 January 1995 (aged 28)	Right-handed	Right-arm fast-medium	2023	
Wicket-keepers
16	**Mohammad Rizwan**	Pakistan	1 June 1992 (aged 30)	Right-handed	—	2021	Captain
Bowlers
11	~~**Shahnawaz Dahani**~~ (Note: Dahani suffered an injury during the first match which ruled him out of the tournament.)	Pakistan	5 August 1998 (aged 24)	Right-handed	Right-arm medium-fast	2021	
14	Sameen Gul	Pakistan	4 February 1999 (aged 24)	Right-handed	Right-arm medium-fast	2023	
19	Izharulhaq Naveed	Afghanistan	10 November 2003 (aged 19)	Right-handed	Right-arm leg break	2023	Partial replacement for David Miller in group stage matches
21	**Akeal Hosein**	West Indies	25 April 1993 (aged 29)	Left-handed	Left-arm orthodox	2023	
24	Usama Mir	Pakistan	23 December 1995 (aged 27)	Right-handed	Right-arm leg break	2023	
32	Mohammad Ilyas	Pakistan	21 March 1999 (aged 23)	Right-handed	Right-arm medium	2023	Full replacement for Shahnawaz Dahani
50	Ihsanullah	Pakistan	11 October 2002 (aged 20)	Right-handed	Right-arm medium-fast	2022	
82	**Josh Little**	Ireland	1 November 1999 (aged 23)	Right-handed	Left-arm fast-medium	2023	
95	~~**Adil Rashid**~~ (Note: Rashid withdrew from the tournament due to international duty.)	England	17 February 1988 (aged 34)	Right-handed	Right-arm leg break	2023	
119	**Sheldon Cottrell**	West Indies	19 August 1989 (aged 33)	Right-handed	Left-arm fast-medium	2023	

- Source: Cricinfo

== Administration and coaching staff ==
Name	Position
Haider Azhar	Manager and COO
Andy Flower	Head coach
Abdul Rehman	Assistant coach
Mushtaq Ahmed	Spin bowling coach
Ottis Gibson	Fast bowling coach
Richard Halsall	Fielding and strength and conditioning coach
Cliff Deacon	Physio

- Source: Janoobis

== Kit manufacturers and sponsors ==
Kit manufacturer	Shirt sponsor (chest)	Shirt sponsor (back)	Chest branding	Sleeve branding
AJ Sports	Pepsi	Fatima Group	Wolf777 News	Asia Ghee, Shell V-Power, Samaa TV

Home kit

Away kit

== Season standings ==
=== Points table ===
Pos	Team	Pld	W	L	NR	Pts	NRR
1	Lahore Qalandars (C)	10	7	3	0	14	0.915
2	Multan Sultans (R)	10	6	4	0	12	0.500
3	Islamabad United (4th)	10	6	4	0	12	−0.708
4	Peshawar Zalmi (3rd)	10	5	5	0	10	−0.452
5	Karachi Kings	10	3	7	0	6	0.756
6	Quetta Gladiators	10	3	7	0	6	−1.066

Source: ESPNcricinfo
- The top 4 teams qualified for the playoffs.
- Advances to Qualifier.
- Advances to Eliminator 1.

Notes:

- C = Champions;
- R = Runner-up;
- (x) = Position at the end of the tournament

== Group fixtures ==
Match 1
13 February 2023
20:30 (N)
Scorecard

Lahore Qalandars; 175/6 (20 overs)	v	Multan Sultans (H); 174/6 (20 overs)
Fakhar Zaman 66 (42); Usama Mir 2/25 (4 overs)		Mohammad Rizwan 75 (50); Hussain Talat 1/16 (2 overs)

Lahore Qalandars won by 1 run
Multan Cricket Stadium, Multan
Umpires: Martin Saggers (Eng) and Asif Yaqoob (Pak)
Player of the match: Fakhar Zaman (Lahore Qalandars)

- Multan Sultans won the toss and elected to field.
- Mirza Tahir Baig (Lahore Qalandars) made his T20 debut.

Match 3
15 February 2023
18:00 (N)
Scorecard

Quetta Gladiators; 110 (18.5 overs)	v	Multan Sultans (H); 111/1 (13.3 overs)
Jason Roy 27 (18); Ihsanullah 5/12 (4 overs)		Rilee Rossouw 78* (42); Nuwan Thushara 1/21 (2 overs)

Multan Sultans won by 9 wickets
Multan Cricket Stadium, Multan
Umpires: Faisal Afridi (Pak) and Asif Yaqoob (Pak)
Player of the match: Ihsanullah (Multan Sultans)

- Multan Sultans won the toss and elected to field.

Match 5
17 February 2023
18:00 (N)
Scorecard

(H) Multan Sultans; 210/3 (20 overs)	v	Peshawar Zalmi; 154 (18.5 overs)
Rilee Rossouw 75 (36); Salman Irshad 2/38 (4 overs)		Saim Ayub 53 (37); Usama Mir 3/22 (4 overs)

Multan Sultans won by 56 runs
Multan Cricket Stadium, Multan
Umpires: Faisal Afridi (Pak) and Asif Yaqoob (Pak)
Player of the match: Rilee Rossouw (Multan Sultans)

- Peshawar Zalmi won the toss and elected to field.

Match 7
19 February 2023
14:00
Scorecard

(H) Multan Sultans; 190/4 (20 overs)	v	Islamabad United; 138 (17.5 overs)
David Miller 52 (25); Rumman Raees 1/25 (3 overs)		Rassie van der Dussen 49 (32); Abbas Afridi 4/22 (3 overs)

Multan Sultans won by 52 runs
Multan Cricket Stadium, Multan
Umpires: Faisal Afridi (Pak) and Asif Yaqoob (Pak)
Player of the match: Abbas Afridi (Multan Sultans)

- Islamabad United won the toss and elected to field.

Match 11
22 February 2023
19:00 (N)
Scorecard

(H) Multan Sultans; 196/2 (20 overs)	v	Karachi Kings; 193/5 (20 overs)
Mohammed Rizwan 110* (64); Shoaib Malik 1/29 (4 overs)		James Vince 75 (34); Abbas Afridi 2/55 (4 overs)

Multan Sultans won by 3 runs
Multan Cricket Stadium, Multan
Umpires: Martin Saggers (Eng) and Shozab Raza (Pak)
Player of the match: Mohammed Rizwan (Multan Sultans)

- Karachi Kings won the toss and elected to field.

Match 14
26 February 2023
14:00
Scorecard

(H) Karachi Kings; 167/3 (20 overs)	v	Multan Sultans; 101 (16.3 overs)
Tayyab Tahir 65 (46); Ihsanullah 2/22 (4 overs)		Mohammad Rizwan 29 (25); Shoaib Malik 3/16 (3.3 overs)

Karachi Kings won by 66 runs
National Stadium, Karachi
Umpires: Alex Wharf (Eng) and Ahsan Raza (Pak)
Player of the match: Tabraiz Shamsi (Karachi Kings)

- Multan Sultans won the toss and elected to field.

Match 20
4 March 2023
19:00 (N)
Scorecard

(H) Lahore Qalandars; 180/9 (20 overs)	v	Multan Sultans; 159/7 (20 overs)
Sam Billings 54 (35); Kieron Pollard 2/16 (2 overs)		Kieron Pollard 39 (28); Rashid Khan 3/15 (4 overs)

Lahore Qalandars won by 21 runs
Gaddafi Stadium, Lahore
Umpires: Faisal Afridi (Pak) and Martin Saggers (Eng)
Player of the match: Rashid Khan (Lahore Qalandars)

- Lahore Qalandars won the toss and elected to bat.
- As a result of this match, Lahore Qalandars qualified for the playoffs.

Match 24
7 March 2023
19:00 (N)
Scorecard

Multan Sultans; 205/5 (20 overs)	v	Islamabad United (H); 209/8 (19.5 overs)
Shan Masood 75 (50); Shadab Khan 2/26 (4 overs)		Faheem Ashraf 51* (26); Anwar Ali 3/33 (4 overs)

Islamabad United won by 2 wickets
Rawalpindi Cricket Stadium, Rawalpindi
Umpires: Faisal Afridi (Pak) and Rashid Riaz (Pak)
Player of the match: Faheem Ashraf (Islamabad United)

- Islamabad United won the toss and elected to field.

Match 27
10 March 2023
19:00 (N)
Scorecard

Peshawar Zalmi; 242/6 (20 overs)	v	Multan Sultans; 244/6 (19.1 overs)
Babar Azam 73 (39); Abbas Afridi 4/39 (4 overs)		Rilee Rossouw 121 (51); Azmatullah Omarzai 2/61 (4 overs)

Multan Sultans won by 4 wickets
Rawalpindi Cricket Stadium, Rawalpindi
Umpires: Ahsan Raza (Pak) and Martin Saggers (Eng)
Player of the match: Rilee Rossouw (Multan Sultans)

- Peshawar Zalmi won the toss and elected to bat.
- This was the highest run-chase in PSL history.
- As a result of this match, Multan Sultans qualified for the playoffs.

Match 28
11 March 2023
19:00 (N)
Scorecard

Multan Sultans; 262/3 (20 overs)	v	Quetta Gladiators; 253/8 (20 overs)
Usman Khan 120 (43); Qais Ahmad 2/77 (4 overs)		Omair Yousuf 67 (36); Abbas Afridi 5/47 (4 overs)

Multan Sultans won by 9 runs
Rawalpindi Cricket Stadium, Rawalpindi
Umpires: Alex Wharf (Eng) and Martin Saggers (Eng)
Player of the match: Abbas Afridi (Multan Sultans)

- Quetta Gladiators won the toss and elected to field.
- Usman Khan (Multan Sultans) scored the fastest century in terms of balls (36) in PSL history.
- This was the highest total scored by a team in PSL history.
- As a result of this match, Peshawar Zalmi qualified for the playoffs.

== Playoffs ==
=== Qualifier ===
Match 31
15 March 2023
19:00 (N)
Scorecard

Multan Sultans; 160/5 (20 overs)	v	Lahore Qalandars (H); 76 (14.3 overs)
Kieron Pollard 57 (34); Haris Rauf 3/34 (4 overs)		Sam Billings 19 (27); Sheldon Cottrell 3/20 (3 overs)

Multan Sultans won by 84 runs
Gaddafi Stadium, Lahore
Umpires: Aleem Dar (Pak) and Alex Wharf (Eng)
Player of the match: Kieron Pollard (Multan Sultans)

- Multan Sultans won the toss and elected to bat.

=== Final ===
Match 34
18 March 2023
19:00 (N)
Scorecard

(H) Lahore Qalandars; 200/6 (20 overs)	v	Multan Sultans; 199/8 (20 overs)
Abdullah Shafique 65 (40); Usama Mir 3/24 (3 overs)		Rilee Rossouw 52 (32); Shaheen Afridi 4/51 (4 overs)

Lahore Qalandars won by 1 run
Gaddafi Stadium, Lahore
Umpires: Alex Wharf (Eng) and Rashid Riaz (Pak)
Player of the match: Shaheen Afridi (Lahore Qalandars)

- Lahore Qalandars won the toss and elected to bat.

== Statistics ==
=== Most runs ===
Player	Innings	Runs	High score	50s	100s
Mohammad Rizwan	12	550	110*	4	1
Rilee Rossouw	11	453	121	3	1
Kieron Pollard	10	260	57	2	0
Shan Masood	9	236	75	2	0
Usman Khan	4	167	120	0	1

- Source: ESPNcricinfo

=== Most wickets ===
Player	Innings	Wickets	Best bowling
Abbas Afridi	11	23	5/47
Ihsanullah	12	22	5/12
Usama Mir	12	17	3/22
Anwar Ali	7	10	3/33
Kieron Pollard	5	3	2/16

- Source: ESPNcricinfo
