= 2023 Pakistan Super League players draft =

Cricket league draft

The player draft for the 2023 Pakistan Super League was held on 15 December 2022. Before the draft teams were allowed to retain a maximum of eight players and make transfers.

== Background ==
Ramiz Raja had hinted that the draft would be replaced by an auction, but the format was retained. The PCB announced that Lahore Qalandars will have the first pick.

Each team had the right to exercise one wildcard pick. Each team had a right-to-match card which allowed franchises to buy back one player they had released by paying a set fee in each category:

- Platinum ($130,000-$170,000)
- Diamond ($60,000-$80,000)
- Gold ($40,000-$50,000)
- Silver ($25,000)
- Emerging ($7,500)

== Transfers ==
Babar Azam and a supplementary round pick were traded from Karachi Kings to Peshawar Zalmi in return for Shoaib Malik and Haider Ali.

== Retained players ==
On 11 November 2022, the retained players' list was announced. The franchises were allowed to retain a maximum of eight players from the previous season. All the franchises fully utilized their quota of player retentions apart from Peshawar Zalmi.

Class	Islamabad United	Karachi Kings	Lahore Qalandars	Multan Sultans	Peshawar Zalmi	Quetta Gladiators
Platinum	Shadab Khan	Haider Ali	Shaheen Afridi; Rashid Khan	Mohammad Rizwan	Babar Azam	Mohammad Nawaz
Diamond	Asif Ali; Mohammad Wasim	Imad Wasim; Mohammad Amir; Shoaib Malik	Haris Rauf; David Wiese	Khushdil Shah; Shan Masood; Rilee Rossouw	Wahab Riaz; Sherfane Rutherford	Iftikhar Ahmed; Jason Roy
Gold	Azam Khan; Faheem Ashraf; Hasan Ali		Abdullah Shafique	Shahnawaz Dahani; Tim David	Mohammad Haris	Mohammad Hasnain; Sarfaraz Ahmed
Silver	Colin Munro (mentor); Paul Stirling	Aamer Yamin; Mir Hamza; Sharjeel Khan	Kamran Ghulam; Harry Brook		Aamer Jamal; Salman Irshad; Tom Kohler-Cadmore	Umar Akmal (mentor); Naveen-ul-Haq; Will Smeed
Emerging		Qasim Akram	Zaman Khan	Abbas Afridi; Ihsanullah		

== Draft picks ==
More than 493 foreign players were registered for the draft. For the emerging category, players should be under 23 years of age as of 1 January 2023 and could have either played less than 10 PSL matches in previous seasons or not have been selected in the national squad.

Class	Islamabad United	Karachi Kings	Lahore Qalandars	Multan Sultans	Peshawar Zalmi	Quetta Gladiators
Platinum	Alex Hales; Rahmanullah Gurbaz	Matthew Wade; Imran Tahir	Fakhar Zaman	David Miller; Josh Little	Bhanuka Rajapaksa; Rovman Powell	Wanindu Hasaranga; Naseem Shah (Note: Right To Match card (RTM): Player was picked by another franchise in the draft but their franchise from the previous season used their Right To Match card to bring them back in their squad.)
Diamond	Fazalhaq Farooqi	James Vince; James Fuller	Hussain Talat		Mujeeb Ur Rahman	Odean Smith
Gold		Andrew Tye	Sikandar Raza; Liam Dawson	Akeal Hosein	Danish Aziz; Arshad Iqbal	Ahsan Ali
Silver	Abrar Ahmed; Sohaib Maqsood; Rumman Raees	Tayyab Tahir; Muhammad Akhlaq	Dilbar Hussain; Mirza Tahir Baig; Ahmed Daniyal	Usama Mir; Usman Khan; Sameen Gul; Anwar Ali; Mohammad Sarwar	Saim Ayub; Usman Qadir	Umaid Asif; Muhammad Zahid
Emerging	Zeeshan Zameer; Hassan Nawaz	Irfan Khan	Shawaiz Irfan		Sufiyan Muqeem; Haseebullah Khan	Abdul Bangalzai; Aimal Khan
Supplementary	Moeen Ali; Mubasir Khan	Tabraiz Shamsi; Mohammad Umar	Jordan Cox; Jalat Khan	Adil Rashid; Arafat Minhas	James Neesham; Khurram Shahzad	Martin Guptill; Omair Yousuf

== Replacements ==
A replacement player draft took place through a conference call on 24 January 2023, in which franchises were also allowed to select two supplementary players. Peshawar had reserved their pick in the first supplementary round and named Khurram Shahzad as their pick. Lahore and Peshawar reserved their picks in the second supplementary round. Islamabad, Multan, Peshawar and Quetta reserved picks in the replacement draft. Further replacements were announced on 7 February 2023.

Class	IU	KK	LQ	MS	PZ	QG
Supplementary	Tom Curran; Zafar Gohar	Ben Cutting; Muhammad Musa	Ahsan Hafeez	Kieron Pollard; Amad Butt	Haris Sohail; Shakib Al Hasan	~~Qais Ahmad~~ (Note: Qais Ahmed was later changed to a replacement pick for Wanindu Hasaranga.); Saud Shakeel; Yasir Khan

Player	Team	Replaced with	Availability	Reason
Rashid Khan	LQ	Sam Billings	Partial	National duty
Rovman Powell	PZ	Richard Gleeson	Partial	National duty
Rahmanullah Gurbaz	IU	Gus Atkinson	Partial	National duty
Alex Hales	IU	Tymal Mills	Partial	National duty
Mujeeb Ur Rahman	PZ	Peter Hatzoglou	Partial	National duty
Naveen-ul-Haq	QG	Nuwan Thushara	Partial	National duty
Jordan Cox	LQ	Kusal Mendis	Partial	National duty
Harry Brook	LQ	Shane Dadswell	Full	National duty
Adil Rashid	MS	Wayne Parnell	Full	National duty
David Miller	MS	Izharulhaq Naveed; Johnson Charles (Note: Naveed partially replaced Miller for the group stage matches while Charles fully replaced Miller for the playoff matches.)	Partial	National duty
Odean Smith	QG	Dwaine Pretorius	Partial	National duty
Jason Roy	QG	~~Will Jacks~~; Najibullah Zadran (Note: Najibullah Zadran was later made the replacement for Jason Roy.)	Partial	National duty
Tabraiz Shamsi	KK	Faisal Akram	Partial	National duty
Moeen Ali	IU	Rassie van der Dussen	Partial	National duty
James Vince	KK	Adam Rossington	Partial	National duty
Kusal Mendis	LQ	Shai Hope	Full	NOC issue
Ahsan Ali	QG	Mohammad Hafeez	Full	Injury
Shahnawaz Dahani	MS	Mohammad Ilyas	Full	Injury
Wayne Parnell	MS	Carlos Brathwaite	Full	Injury
Sherfane Rutherford	PZ	Dasun Shanaka	Full	Injury
Mir Hamza	KK	Akif Javed	Full	Injury
Shakib Al Hasan	PZ	Azmatullah Omarzai	Partial	Family emergency
Wanindu Hasaranga	QG	Qais Ahmad	Full	NOC issue
Sarfaraz Ahmed	QG	Bismillah Khan	Partial	Injury
Josh Little	MS	Sheldon Cottrell	Full	Injury
