= 2023 Pakistan Super League final =

Cricket match

- Event: 2023 Pakistan Super League
Lahore Qalandars	Multan Sultans
Lahore Qalandars team colours	Multan Sultans team colours
200/6	199/8
20 overs	20 overs
- Lahore Qalandars won by 1 run
- Date: 18 March 2023
- Venue: Gaddafi Stadium, Lahore
- Player of the match: Shaheen Afridi (Lahore Qalandars)
- Umpires: Alex Wharf; Rashid Riaz

The 2023 Pakistan Super League final was a Twenty20 cricket match played between defending champion Lahore Qalandars and Multan Sultans to decide the champions of the 2023 Pakistan Super League on 18 March 2023 at the Gaddafi Stadium in Lahore, Pakistan.

Lahore Qalandars won the match by 1 run, to win their second Pakistan Super League title.

The match was originally scheduled to be played on 19 March 2023 but was rescheduled due to forecasted bad weather.

== Route to the Final ==
At the end of the league stage, Lahore Qalandars and Multan Sultans had played ten matches each and finished at 1st and 2nd positions respectively in the points table. Lahore Qalandars had a good league stage phase where they lost only three times and won seven matches. Multan had won six matches and lost four. In the playoffs, Multan faced Lahore in the Qualifier at the Gaddafi Stadium, where Multan was victorious by 84 runs and qualified for the final. Lahore Qalandars after losing, faced Peshawar Zalmi (the winners of Eliminator 1) in Eliminator 2, where Lahore by 4 wickets and qualified for the final.

League progression
Team	Group matches										Playoffs		
Team	1	2	3	4	5	6	7	8	9	10	Q1/E	Q2	F
Lahore Qalandars	2	2	4	6	8	10	12	12	14	14	L	W	W
Multan Sultans	0	2	4	6	8	8	8	8	10	12	W		L

Win	Loss	No result

- Note: The total points at the end of each group match are listed.
- Note: Click on the points (group matches) or W/L (playoffs) to see the match summary.

Lahore Qalandars				Multan Sultans
League Stage
Opponent	Date	Result		Opponent	Date	Result
Multan Sultans	13 February 2023	Won	Match 1	Lahore Qalandars	13 February 2023	Lost
Karachi Kings	19 February 2023	Lost	Match 2	Quetta Gladiators	15 February 2023	Won
Quetta Gladiators	21 February 2023	Won	Match 3	Peshawar Zalmi	17 February 2023	Won
Peshawar Zalmi	26 February 2023	Won	Match 4	Islamabad United	19 February 2023	Won
Islamabad United	27 February 2023	Won	Match 5	Karachi Kings	22 February 2023	Won
Quetta Gladiators	2 March 2023	Won	Match 6	Karachi Kings	26 February 2023	Lost
Multan Sultans	4 March 2023	Won	Match 7	Lahore Qalandars	4 March 2023	Lost
Peshawar Zalmi	7 March 2023	Lost	Match 8	Islamabad United	7 March 2023	Lost
Islamabad United	9 March 2023	Won	Match 9	Peshawar Zalmi	10 March 2023	Won
Karachi Kings	12 March 2023	Lost	Match 10	Quetta Gladiators	11 March 2023	Won
Playoffs
Qualifier
Opponent	Date	Result		Opponent	Date	Result
Multan Sultans	15 March 2023	Lost	Match 11	Lahore Qalandars	15 March 2023	Won
Eliminator 2
Opponent	Date	Result
Peshawar Zalmi	17 March 2023	Won	Match 12
2023 Pakistan Super League final

Source: Geo Super

=== League stage matches ===
Both sides played each other twice in the round-robin stage of the tournament. The first league stage match was won by Lahore Qalandars by 1 run, on 13 February at Multan Cricket Stadium. Multan had won the toss and chose to field. Lahore started off well with 50 for no loss in the powerplay but lost their momentum and struggled to score runs. Fakhar Zaman's innings of 66 off 42 deliveries helped Lahore to a score of 175 runs for 6 wickets. In reply, Multan started really well, with their openers putting up a partnership of 100 runs. However, Lahore got the key wicket of Mohammad Rizwan which slowed Multan's run scoring and left 15 runs to get in the last over. In the final over, Zaman Khan bowled the first 4 deliveries brilliantly and only conceded 4 runs while Multan lost 3 wickets. Khushdil Shah almost won the game after he hit the 5th delivery for a four leaving 6 required on the last delivery. However, Khushdil could only hit the final delivery for a four and Lahore won the match by 1 run.

The second league stage match between the two sides was held in Lahore on 4 March. Lahore had won the toss and elected to bat first. Lahore got a good start in the powerplay scoring 56 runs. Abdullah Shafique and Sam Billings put up a good partnership after the powerplay and started to gain momentum. However, Shafique would get out cheaply to Kieron Pollard after scoring 48 runs and Billings would also get out soon afterwards for 52 runs. Lahore struggled to score with wickets falling in regular intervals. Lahore managed to score 180 runs for 9 wickets in their innings leaving Multan a target of 181. Multan also started off with a good powerplay, scoring 44 runs for no loss. Following the loss of their openers though, Multan struggled to score runs at the required pace with Rashid Khan starring with the bowl, getting figures of 3 wickets for 15 runs in 4 overs. Lahore went on to win the match comfortably by 21 runs and qualified for the playoffs in the process.

13 February 2023 (D/N)
Match 1
Scorecard

Lahore Qalandars; 175/6 (20 overs)	v	Multan Sultans (H); 174/6 (20 overs)

Lahore Qalandars won by 1 run
Multan Cricket Stadium, Multan

4 March 2023 (D/N)
Match 20
Scorecard

Lahore Qalandars (H); 180/9 (20 overs)	v	Multan Sultans; 159/7 (20 overs)

Lahore Qalandars won by 21 runs
Gaddafi Stadium, Lahore

=== Playoffs ===
==== Qualifier ====
The two teams faced each other in the Qualifier after finishing as the top two teams in the table. Multan had elected to bat first and didn't look like scoring a big total but Kieron Pollard's innings of 57 off 34 deliveries powered Multan to a total of 160. In reply, Lahore had an awful innings, regularly losing wickets with no one able to bat comfortably. Lahore got all out for 76 and Multan won the match by 84 runs, which meant that they qualified for their third consecutive PSL final.

15 March 2023 (D/N)
Match 31
Scorecard

Multan Sultans; 160/5 (20 overs)	v	Lahore Qalandars (H); 76 (14.3 overs)

Multan Sultans won by 84 runs
Gaddafi Stadium, Lahore

== Match ==
=== Summary ===
Lahore Qalandars won the toss and elected to bat first. Lahore Qalandars scored 200 runs for a loss of 6 wickets in 20 overs. Chasing 201 runs, Multan Sultans scored 199 for the loss of 8 wickets in 20 overs, falling short by 1 run. Shaheen Afridi was named as the player of the match after scoring 44 runs in 15 balls and taking 4 wickets for 51 runs.

=== Lahore Qalandars innings ===
Lahore got off to a good start with Mirza Baig leading the way, scoring 30 off 18 deliveries before getting out at 4.6 overs to Ihsanullah. Lahore slowed down slightly and after Fakhar Zaman tried to speed things up, he got out at 11.2 overs to Usama Mir. Mir picked up 2 wickets in the 14th over, getting Sam Billings and Ahsan Hafeez out. Sikandar Raza fell in the next over to Khushdil Shah and Lahore looked in trouble. Following these wickets, Shaheen Afridi walked in and started a barrage of boundaries. Lahore scored 14 runs in the 16th over, 24 runs in the 17th over, 11 runs in the 18th over, 22 runs in the 19th over and 14 runs in the 20th over. Abdullah Shafique got out after a good innings of 65 runs off 40 deliveries at 18.4 overs. Lahore finished their innings scoring 200 runs, thanks to a brilliant innings of 44 runs off only 15 deliveries by Afridi.

=== Multan Sultans innings ===
In the chase, Multan started off brilliantly, scoring 40 runs off 3 overs. David Wiese picked up the wicket of Usman Khan at 3.3 overs after which Rilee Rossouw finished off the powerplay brilliantly, bringing Multan to a total of 72 with Multan cruising in the chase. Rossouw continued his attacking play after the powerplay with Mohammad Rizwan standing firm as well. Rashid Khan provided the key breakthrough of Rossouw at 10.3 overs after Rossouw scored 52 runs in 32 deliveries. Rashid also got the wicket of Rizwan after a brilliant catch by Wiese at 12.4 overs. Afridi picked up the wickets of Kieron Pollard at 15.3 overs and Tim David at 17.1 overs. Anwar Ali and Usama Mir would also fall at 17.5 overs and 17.6 overs to Afridi with Lahore taking the game away from Multan. Khushdil Shah and Abbas Afridi scored 22 runs in the 19th over, which was bowled by Haris Rauf, leaving 13 runs to get in the last over. Zaman Khan bowled the last over and after conceding 5 runs in the first 4 deliveries, got hit for a four by Khushdil on the fifth delivery leaving four runs required off the final delivery. On the final delivery, Khushdil got runout in an attempt to run a third run and Lahore won the match by a small margin of 1 run. This meant that Lahore became the first team in PSL history to successfully defend their title. Shaheen Afridi was named man of the match while Ihsanullah was named man of the series.

Match 34
18 March 2023
19:00 (N)
Scorecard

(H) Lahore Qalandars; 200/6 (20 overs)	v	Multan Sultans; 199/8 (20 overs)
Abdullah Shafique 65 (40); Usama Mir 3/24 (3 overs)		Rilee Rossouw 52 (32); Shaheen Afridi 4/51 (4 overs)

Lahore Qalandars won by 1 run
Gaddafi Stadium, Lahore
Umpires: Alex Wharf (Eng) and Rashid Riaz (Pak)
Player of the match: Shaheen Afridi (Lahore Qalandars)

- Lahore Qalandars won the toss and elected to bat.
- By winning in the final, Lahore Qalandars became the first team in PSL history to defend their title.

=== Match officials ===
- On-field umpires: Alex Wharf and Rashid Riaz
- TV umpire: Asif Yaqoob
- Reserve umpire: Faisal Afridi
- Match referee: Roshan Mahanama

=== Scorecard ===
Toss: Lahore Qalandars won the toss and elected to bat.

Lahore Qalandars innings
Player	Status	Runs	Balls	4s	6s	Strike rate
Mirza Tahir Baig	c K. Shah b Ihsanullah	30	18	5	1	166.66
Fakhar Zaman	c U. Khan b Mir	39	34	4	1	114.70
Abdullah Shafique	c Rossouw b A. Ali	65	40	8	2	162.50
Sam Billings	b Mir	9	8	0	1	112.50
Ahsan Hafeez	lbw Mir	0	1	0	0	0.00
Sikandar Raza	b K. Shah	1	2	0	0	50.00
Shaheen Afridi	not out	44	15	2	5	293.33
David Wiese	not out	2	2	0	0	100.00
Rashid Khan	did not bat					
Haris Rauf	did not bat					
Zaman Khan	did not bat					
Extras 10 (lb 2, wd 8); Total 200/6 (20 overs)				19	10	10.00 RR

Fall of wickets: 1-38 (Mirza Tahir Baig, 4.6 ov), 2-95 (Fakhar Zaman, 11.2 ov), 3-111 (Sam Billings, 13.4 ov), 4-111 (Ahsan Hafeez, 13.5 ov), 5-112 (Sikandar Raza, 14.1 ov), 6-178 (Abdullah Shafique, 18.4 ov)

Multan Sultans bowling
Bowler	Overs	Maidens	Runs	Wickets	Econ	Wides	NBs
Sheldon Cottrell	2	0	24	0	12.00	0	0
Anwar Ali	4	0	46	1	11.50	1	0
Ihsanullah	3	0	37	1	12.33	5	0
Abbas Afridi	4	0	38	0	9.50	1	0
Kieron Pollard	2	0	18	0	9.00	1	0
Usama Mir	3	0	24	3	8.00	0	0
Khushdil Shah	2	0	11	1	5.50	0	0

Target: 201 runs from 20 overs at 10.05 RR

Multan Sultans innings
Player	Status	Runs	Balls	4s	6s	Strike rate
Usman Khan	b Wiese	18	12	4	0	150.00
Mohammad Rizwan	c Wiese b R. Khan	34	23	5	0	147.82
Rilee Rossouw	b R. Khan	52	32	7	2	162.50
Kieron Pollard	c F. Zaman b S. Afridi	19	16	2	0	118.75
Tim David	c Wiese b S. Afridi	20	16	3	0	125.00
Khushdil Shah	run out (Wiese/S. Afridi)	25	12	3	1	208.33
Anwar Ali	b S. Afridi	1	2	0	0	50.00
Usama Mir	c Rauf b S. Afridi	0	1	0	0	0.00
Abbas Afridi	*	17	6	2	1	283.33
Sheldon Cottrell	did not bat					
Ihsanullah	did not bat					
Extras 13 (b 2, lb 7, wd 4); Total 199/8 (20 overs)				26	4	9.95 RR

Fall of wickets: 1-41 (Usman Khan, 3.3 ov), 2-105 (Rilee Rossouw, 10.3 ov), 3-122 (Mohammad Rizwan, 12.4 ov), 4-146 (Kieron Pollard, 15.3 ov), 5-160 (Tim David, 17.1 ov), 6-166 (Anwar Ali, 17.5 ov), 7-166 (Usama Mir, 17.6 ov), 8-199 (Khushdil Shah, 19.6 ov)

Lahore Qalandars bowling
Bowler	Overs	Maidens	Runs	Wickets	Econ	Wides	NBs
Shaheen Afridi	4	0	51	4	12.75	2	0
Zaman Khan	4	0	33	0	8.25	0	0
David Wiese	4	0	31	1	7.75	0	0
Rashid Khan	4	0	26	2	6.50	0	0
Haris Rauf	4	0	49	0	12.25	2	0

Result: Lahore Qalandars won by 1 run
