= List of Pakistan Super League records and statistics =

This is a list of Pakistan Super League records and statistics since the inaugural season in 2016. The league, which is organised by the PCB, is a franchise Twenty20 cricket competition held initially in the UAE and now in Pakistan.

== Team records ==
=== Result summary ===
Teams	Span	Mat	Won	Lost	Tie&W	Tie&L	NR	Win%
Multan Sultans	2018–present	89	46	40	0	1	2	51.68
Islamabad United	2016–present	112	61	50	1	0	0	54.46
Peshawar Zalmi	2016–present	114	59	53	1	0	1	51.75
Quetta Gladiators	2016–present	104	52	50	0	0	2	50.00
Lahore Qalandars	2016–present	107	48	55	1	2	1	44.85
Karachi Kings	2016–present	106	42	60	1	1	2	39.62
Hyderabad Kingsmen	2026–present	13	7	6	0	0	0	53.84
Rawalpindiz	2026–present	10	1	9	0	0	0	10.00

Source: ESPNcricinfo. Last update: 29 March 2026.

Note:

- Tie&W and Tie&L indicates matches tied and then won or lost in a "Super Over".
- The result percentage excludes no results and counts ties (irrespective of a tiebreaker) as half a win.

=== Highest totals ===
Team	Innings	Total	Opponent	Season
Quetta Gladiators	1	263/3	Islamabad United	2025
Multan Sultans	1	262/3	Quetta Gladiators	2023
Quetta Gladiators	2	253/8	Multan Sultans	2023
Islamabad United	1	251/5	Karachi Kings	2025
Islamabad United	1	247/2	Peshawar Zalmi	2021
Peshawar Zalmi	1	246/3	Karachi Kings	2026
Multan Sultans	1	245/3	Quetta Gladiators	2022
Multan Sultans	2	244/6	Peshawar Zalmi	2023

Source: ESPNcricinfo. Last update: 10 April 2026.

=== Lowest totals ===
Team	Innings	Total	Opponent	Season
Lahore Qalandars	1	59	Peshawar Zalmi	2017
Quetta Gladiators	2	73	Multan Sultans	2021
Lahore Qalandars	2	76	Multan Sultans	2023
Lahore Qalandars	1	78	Peshawar Zalmi	2019
Hyderabad Kingsmen	2	80	Islamabad United	2026
Islamabad United	2	82	Karachi Kings	2017

Source: ESPNcricinfo. Last update: 12 March 2024.

== Batting records ==
=== Most runs ===
Rank	Runs	Batsman	Team(s)	Matches	Innings	HS	Period
1	4,380	Babar Azam	Islamabad United, Karachi Kings, Peshawar Zalmi	111	109	115	2016–2026
2	3,365	Fakhar Zaman	Lahore Qalandars	105	105	115	2017–2026
3	2,974	Mohammad Rizwan	Karachi Kings, Lahore Qalandars, Multan Sultans, Rawalpindiz	103	92	110*	2016–2026
4	2,604	Rilee Rossouw	Multan Sultans, Quetta Gladiators	104	98	121	2017–2026
5	2,350	Shoaib Malik	Karachi Kings, Multan Sultans, Peshawar Zalmi, Quetta Gladiators	93	88	73	2016–2025

Source: ESPNcricinfo. Last update: 12 April 2026.

=== Highest individual score ===
Rank	Runs	Batsman	Team	Opposition	Venue	Season
1	145*	Jason Roy	QG	PZ	Rawalpindi	2023
2	127*	Colin Ingram	KK	QG	Sharjah	2019
3	121	Rilee Rossouw	MS	PZ	Rawalpindi	2023
4	120	Usman Khan	MS	QG	Rawalpindi	2023
5	117*	Cameron Delport	IU	LQ	Karachi	2019
5	117	Sharjeel Khan	IU	PZ	Dubai	2016
5	117	Martin Guptill	QG	KK	Karachi	2023

Source: ESPNcricinfo. Last update: 10 March 2024.

=== Highest career average ===
Rank	Average	Player	Team	Innings	Not out	Runs	Period
1	47.09	Babar Azam	IU, KK, PZ	109	16	4380	2016–2025
2	43.63	Usman Khan	MS, QG	25	3	960	2021–2025
3	43.21	Tim David	LQ, MS	22	8	605	2021–2023
4	42.61	Mohammad Rizwan	KK, LQ, MS	82	17	2,770	2016–2025
5	38.3	Kieron Pollard	KK, MS, PZ	48	18	1,149	2017–2024
6	37.81	Tamim Iqbal	LQ, PZ	20	4	605	2016–2020

Source: ESPNcricinfo. Last update: 13 January 2026.

Note:

- Minimum 20 innings

=== Most 50+ scores ===
Rank	50+ scores	Player	Teams	Innings	100	50	Runs	Period
1	43	Babar Azam	IU, KK, PZ	109	4	39	4,380	2016–2026
2	30	Fakhar Zaman	LQ	105	3	27	3,365	2017–2026
3	23	Muhammad Rizwan	KK, LQ, MS	92	2	21	2,974	2016–2026
4	15	Kamran Akmal	PZ	74	3	12	1,972	2016–2022
5	15	Shoaib Malik	KK, MS, PZ	87	0	15	2,336	2016–2024

Source: ESPNcricinfo. Last update: 13 January 2026.

=== Most sixes ===
Rank	6s	Batsman	Team(s)	Matches	Innings	Period
1	128	Fakhar Zaman	LQ	97	97	2017–2026
2	94	Asif Ali	IU, LQ, PZ	91	79	2016–2025
3	92	Rilee Rossouw	MS, QG	95	89	2017–2025
4	89	Kamran Akmal	PZ	75	74	2016–2022
5	82	Shoaib Malik	KK, MS, PZ, QG	93	88	2016–2024

Source: ESPNcricinfo. Last update: 13 January 2026.

=== Most sixes in an innings ===
Rank	6's	Batsman	Team	Opponent	Season
1	12	Ben Dunk	LQ	KK	2020
2	10	Fakhar Zaman	LQ	PZ	2023
2	10	Ben Dunk	LQ	QG	2020
4	9	Shadab Khan	IU	MS	2022
4	9	Usman Khan	MS	QG	2023
4	9	Hassan Nawaz	QG	IU	2025

Source: ESPNcricinfo. Last update: 13 January 2026.

=== Highest strike rates ===
Rank	S/R	Batsman	Team(s)	Matches	Ball faces	Period
1	166.12	Luke Ronchi	IU	31	614	2018–2020
2	164.54	Muhammad Haris	PZ	37	550	2022–2025
3	162.28	Kieron Pollard	KK, MS, PZ	53	708	2017–2024
4	156.94	Asif Ali	IU, PZ, LQ	91	792	2016–2025
5	156.60	Usman Khan	MS, QG	25	613	2021–2025
6	149.81	Colin Munro	IU, KK	54	1090	2019–2025

Minimum of 500 balls faced

Source: ESPNcricinfo. Last update: 13 January 2026.

=== Highest strike rates in an inning ===
Rank	S/R	Batsman	Team	Runs	Balls	Opposition	Date
1	450.00	Anwar Ali	QG	27*	6	KK	24 February 2019
2	433.33	Asif Ali	IU	26*	6	PZ	25 March 2018
3	385.71	Amad Butt	PZ	27*	7	KK	3 March 2021
5	362.50	Colin Ingram	KK	29*	8	MS	10 March 2018
5	362.50	Sherfane Rutherford	PZ	29	8	IU	17 June 2021
6	350.00	David Wiese	LQ	28*	8	IU	25 February 2022
6	350.00	David Wiese	LQ	28*	8	MS	27 February 2022
6	350.00	Faheem Ashraf	QG	28	8	LQ	25 May 2025

Minimum of 25 runs scored

Source: ESPNcricinfo. Last update: 13 January 2026.

=== Most runs in a season ===
Rank	Runs	Batsman	Team	Mat	Inn.	HS	Avg	100s	50s	Season
1	588	Babar Azam	Peshawar	11	11	103	73.50	2	3	2026
1	588	Fakhar Zaman	Lahore Qalandars	13	13	106	45.23	1	7	2022
2	569	Babar Azam	Peshawar Zalmi	11	11	111*	56.9	1	5	2024
3	554	Babar Azam	Karachi Kings	11	11	90*	69.25	0	7	2021
4	550	Muhammad Rizwan	Multan Sultans	12	12	110*	55.00	1	4	2023
5	546	Muhammad Rizwan	Multan Sultans	12	12	83*	68.25	0	7	2022
6	522	Babar Azam	Peshawar Zalmi	11	11	115	52.20	1	5	2023

Source: ESPNcricinfo. Last update: 7 May 2026.

=== Fastest centuries (100) ===
Rank	Balls	Batsman	Team	Opponent	Venue	Season
1	36	Usman Khan	MS	QG	Rawalpindi	2023
2	41	Rilee Rossouw	MS	PZ	Rawalpindi	2023
3	42	James Vince	KK	MS	Karachi	2025
4	43	Rilee Rossouw	MS	QG	Multan	2020
5	44	Jason Roy	QG	PZ	Rawalpindi	2023
5	44	Rilee Rossouw	QG	IU	Rawalpindi	2025

Source: ESPNcricinfo. Last update: 13 January 2026.

=== Fastest half centuries (50) ===
Rank	Balls	Batsman	Team	Opponent	Venue	Season
1	17	Kamran Akmal	PZ	KK	Lahore	2018
1	17	Asif Ali	IU	LQ	Karachi	2019
1	17	Hazratullah Zazai	PZ	KK	Abu Dhabi	2021
1	17	Rilee Rossouw	MS	PZ	Rawalpindi	2023
2	18	Paul Stirling	IU	PZ	Karachi	2022
2	18	Tim David	MS	PZ	Karachi	2022
2	18	Mohammad Haris	PZ	IU	Lahore	2022
3	19	Luke Ronchi	IU	KK	Dubai	2018
4	20	James Vince	MS	IU	Rawalpindi	2020
4	20	Kamran Akmal	PZ	QG	Karachi	2020
4	20	Colin Munro	IU	QG	Abu Dhabi	2021
4	20	Rilee Rossouw	MS	PZ	Abu Dhabi	2021
4	20	Jason Roy	QG	LQ	Karachi	2022
4	20	Rilee Rossouw	MS	QG	Lahore	2022
4	20	Tim David	MS	IU	Rawalpindi	2023

Source: ESPNcricinfo. Last update: 8 March 2024.

== Bowling records ==
=== Most wickets ===
Rank	Wickets	Bowler	Team(s)	Matches	Innings	Best	Period
1	140	Hasan Ali	IU, KK, PZ	101	100	4/15	2016–2026
2	138	Shaheen Afridi	LQ	94	93	5/4	2018–2026
3	122	Shadab Khan	IU	104	102	5/28	2017–2026
4	113	Wahab Riaz	PZ	88	87	4/17	2016–2023
5	104	Faheem Ashraf	IU, QG	95	92	6/19	2018–2026

Source: ESPNcricinfo. Last update: 13 January 2026.

=== Best bowling figures in an innings ===
Rank	BBI	Bowler	Team	Overs	Opponent	Season
1	6/16	Ravi Bopara	KK	4.0	LQ	2016
2	6/19	Faheem Ashraf	IU	4.0	LQ	2019
3	6/24	Umar Gul	MS	4.0	QG	2018
4	6/40	Usama Mir	MS	4.0	LQ	2024
5	5/4	Shaheen Afridi	LQ	3.4	MS	2018
6	5/7	Shahid Afridi	PZ	4.0	QG	2016

Source: ESPNcricinfo. Last update: 8 March 2024.

=== Best economy rates ===
Rank	Economy	Bowler	Team(s)	Matches	Balls	Period
1	6.13	Rashid Khan	LQ	28	666	2021–2023
2	6.22	Sunil Narine	LQ	17	396	2017–2018
3	6.87	Mohammed Hafeez	LQ, PZ, QG	78	445	2016–2023
4	6.88	Mohammad Sami	IU	36	762	2016–2019
5	6.93	Zulfiqar Babar	QG	18	432	2016–2017

Minimum of 250 balls bowled

Source: ESPNcricinfo. Last update: 8 March 2024.

=== Best averages ===
Rank	Average	Bowler	Team(s)	Matches	Period
1	15.47	Rashid Khan	LQ	28	2021–2023
2	16.08	Ihsanullah	MS	14	2022–2023
3	18.52	James Faulkner	LQ, QG	12	2021–2022
4	18.60	Khurram Shahzad	PZ, QG	20	2021–2025
5	19.64	Imran Tahir	KK, MS	44	2018–2023
6	19.80	Asif Afridi	LQ, MS	14	2022–2025

Minimum of 250 balls bowled

Source: ESPNcricinfo. Last update: 13 January 2026.

=== Best strike rates ===
Rank	S/R	Bowler	Team(s)	Matches	Period
1	12.78	Ihsanullah	MS	14	2022–2023
2	13.23	Abbas Afridi	KK, MS	40	2021–2025
3	13.70	Khurram Shahzad	PZ, QG	20	2021–2025
4	13.74	Shahnawaz Dahani	MS	27	2021–2024
5	13.89	James Faulkner	LQ, QG	12	2021–2022
6	15.13	Rashid Khan	LQ	28	2021–2023

Minimum of 250 balls bowled

Source: ESPNcricinfo. Last update: 13 January.

=== Most four-wickets (& over) hauls ===
Rank	four-wickets hauls	Bowler	Team(s)	Matches	Wickets	Period
1	5	Shaheen Afridi	LQ	84	122	2018–2025
1	5	Hasan Ali	IU, KK, PZ	92	125	2016–2025
2	4	Abbas Afridi	KK, MS	40	60	2021–2025
2	4	Shadab Khan	IU	94	91	2017–2025
2	4	Faheem Ashraf	IU, QG	84	95	2018–2025
3	3	Muhammad Amir	KK, QG	84	86	2016–2025
3	3	Rashid Khan	LQ	28	44	2021–2023

Source: ESPNcricinfo. Last update: 13 January 2026.

=== Best economy rate in an innings ===
Rank	Economy	Bowler	Team	Overs	Runs	Wickets	Opposition	Date
1	0.94	Shaheen Afridi	LQ	3.1	3	3	IU	23 May 2025
2	1.0	Mohammad Nawaz	QG	4	4	2	LQ	24 February 2018
2	1.0	Imad Wasim	KK	2	2	2	PZ	15 June 2021
3	1.09	Shaheen Afridi	LQ	3.4	4	5	MS	9 March 2018
4	1.25	Samit Patel	LQ	4	5	4	QG	7 March 2020
5	1.57	Shahnawaz Dahani	MS	3.1	5	4	LQ	18 June 2021
6	1.74	Shahid Afridi	PZ	4	7	5	QG	14 February 2016
6	1.74	Yasir Shah	LQ	4	7	4	PZ	12 February 2017

Minimum of 2 overs bowled

Source: ESPNcricinfo. Last update: 13 January 2026.

=== Best strike rate in an innings ===
Rank	Strike rate	Bowler	Team	Balls	Runs	Wickets	Opposition	Date
1	2.50	Mitchell Owen	PZ	5	2	2	MS	19 April 2025
1	3.0	Colin Munro	KK	6	14	2	PZ	11 March 2019
1	3.0	Ben Cutting	KK	6	12	2	LQ	19 February 2023
2	3.33	Dan Cristian	MS	10	19	3	IU	26 February 2019
2	3.33	Khurram Shahzad	PZ	10	13	3	IU	12 March 2023
3	4.00	Ravi Bopara	KK	24	16	6	LQ	12 February 2016
3	4.00	Umar Gul	MS	24	24	6	QG	7 March 2018
3	4.00	Faheem Ashraf	IU	24	19	6	LQ	9 March 2019
3	4.00	Usama Mir	MS	24	40	6	LQ	27 February 2024
3	4.00	Imran Tahir	MS	12	7	3	QG	16 June 2021
3	4.00	Chris Jordan	PZ	8	8	2	LQ	12 February 2017

Source: ESPNcricinfo. Last update: 13 January 2026.

=== Most runs conceded in an innings ===
Rank	Runs	Bowler	Team	Overs	Opponent	Season
1	2/77	Qais Ahmad	QG	4.0	MS	2023
2	0/68	Usama Mir	MS	4.0	IU	2024
3	1/67	Shahid Afridi	QG	4.0	IU	2022
4	1/66	Anwar Ali	MS	4.0	PZ	2023
4	0/66	Ahmed Daniyal	PZ	4.0	KK	2025
5	0/65	Zafar Gohar	IU	4.0	PZ	2021

Source: ESPNcricinfo. Last update: 13 January 2026.

=== Most wickets in a season ===
Rank	Wickets	Bowler	Team	Matches	Season
1	25	Hasan Ali	PZ	13	2019
2	24	Usama Mir	MS	12	2024
3	23	Abbas Afridi	MS	11	2023
4	13	Ihsanullah	MS	12	2023
5	21	Faheem Ashraf	IU	12	2019
6	20	Shahnawaz Dahani	MS	11	2021
6	20	Rashid Khan	LQ	11	2023
6	20	Shaheen Afridi	LQ	13	2022

Source: ESPNcricinfo. Last update: 18 March 2024.

== Wicket-keeping records ==
=== Most dismissals ===
Rank	Wicket-keeper	Team(s)	Matches	Innings	Total dismissals	Catches	Stumpings	Period
1	Mohammad Rizwan	LQ, KK, MS	93	86	84	69	15	2016–2025
2	Kamran Akmal	PZ	75	72	62	53	9	2016–2022
3	Sarfraz Ahmed	QG	86	85	56	43	13	2016–2024
4	Azam Khan	IU, QG	61	41	30	23	7	2019–2025
5	Muhammad Haris	PZ	37	26	26	24	2	2022–2025

Source: ESPNcricinfo. Last updated: 13 January 2026.

=== Most dismissals in a season ===
Rank	Wicket-keeper	Team	Matches	Total dismissals	Catches	Stumpings	Season
1	Mohammad Rizwan	MS	12	20	18	2	2021
2	Kamran Akmal	PZ	13	16	15	1	2021
3	Mohammad Rizwan	MS	12	14	13	1	2023
4	Kamran Akmal	PZ	11	12	7	5	2017
4	Muhammad Haris	PZ	10	12	12	0	2025

Source: ESPNcricinfo. Last update: 13 January 2026.

=== Most dismissals in an innings ===
Match date	Wicket-keeper	Team	Innings	Total dismissals	Catches	Stumpings	Opponent	Season
6 Feb	Kamran Akmal	PZ	1	4	4	0	LQ	2016
15 Nov	Ben Dunk	LQ	2	4	4	0	MS	2020
20 Feb	Joe Clarke	KK	1	4	4	0	QG	2021
18 Jun	Mohammad Rizwan	MS	2	4	3	1	LQ	2021
22 Jun	Kamran Akmal	PZ	1	4	4	0	IU	2021
7 Mar	Haseebullah Khan	PZ	2	4	4	0	LQ	2023
9 Mar	Sam Billings	LQ	2	4	4	0	IU	2023
2 May	Muhammad Haris	PZ	1	4	4	0	IU	2025

Source: ESPNcricinfo. Last update: 18 March 2023.

== Fielding records ==
=== Most catches ===
Rank	Fielder	Team(s)	Matches	Catches	Period
1	Babar Azam	IU, KK, PZ	111	58	2016–2025
2	Shadab Khan	IU	94	44	2017–2025
3	Kieron Pollard	KK, MS, PZ	53	42	2017–2024
4	Mohammad Nawaz	QG, IU, KK	88	41	2016–2025
5	Iftikhar Ahmed	IU, KK, MS, PZ, QG	78	40	2016–2025
5	Fakhar Zaman	LQ	97	40	2017–2025

Source: ESPNcricinfo. Last update: 13 January 2026.

=== Most catches in a season ===
Rank	Fielder	Team	Matches	Catches	Season
1	Jason Roy	QG	10	12	2024
2	Kieron Pollard	MS	11	11	2023
2	Rilee Rossouw	QG	11	11	2025
3	Tim David	MS	11	10	2022
3	Fakhar Zaman	LQ	12	10	2020
3	Kieron Pollard	PZ	13	10	2019

Source: ESPNcricinfo. Last update: 13 January 2026.

=== Most catches in an innings ===
Match date	Fielder	Team	Innings	Catches	Opponent	Season
19 Feb	Ravi Bopara	KK	2	4	PZ	2017
26 Feb	Kieron Pollard	KK	1	4	IU	2017
14 Mar	Babar Azam	KK	2	4	IU	2019
16 Mar	Shadab Khan	IU	1	4	PZ	2024
27 Apr	Rilee Rossouw	QG	2	4	PZ	2025

Source: ESPNcricinfo. Last update: 13 January 2026.

== Partnership records ==
=== Highest partnership by wicket ===
Wicket	Runs	First batsman	Second batsman	Team	Opposition	Date
1	176	Babar Azam	Sharjeel Khan	KK	IU	24 February 2021
2	162	David Warner	James Vince	KK	PZ	17 May 2025
3	150*	Colin Munro	Iftikhar Ahmed	IU	KK	14 June 2021
4	155	Ben Dunk	Samit Patel	LQ	QG	3 March 2020
5	142	James Vince	Khushdil Shah	KK	MS	12 April 2025
6	123	Asif Ali	Iftikhar Ahmed	IU	LQ	13 June 2021
7	78	Liam Dawson	Faheem Ashraf	IU	QG	12 February 2022
8	76	Mohammad Nawaz	James Faulkner	QG	IU	3 February 2022
9	62	Hasan Ali	Mohammad Wasim	IU	PZ	22 June 2021
10	63	Grant Elliott	Zulfiqar Babar	QG	PZ	14 February 2016
Source: ESPNcricinfo. Last update: 13 January 2026.

=== Highest partnership by runs ===
Rank	Wicket	Runs	First batsman	Second batsman	Team	Opposition	Date
1	1st Wicket	176	Babar Azam	Sharjeel Khan	KK	IU	24 February 2021
2	1st Wicket	162	Babar Azam	Saim Ayub	PZ	QG	8 March 2023
	2nd Wicket	162	David Warner	James Vince			
3	1st Wicket	157	Babar Azam	Liam Livingstone	KK	MS	15 February 2019
3	1st Wicket	157	Usman Khan	Mohammad Rizwan	MS	QG	11 March 2023
3	1st Wicket	157	Saud Shakeel	Jason Roy	QG	PZ	18 February 2024
Source: ESPNcricinfo. Last update: 13 January 2026.

== Awards ==
=== Green cap and Hanif Mohammad award for best batsman of the season ===
Batsman	Team	Matches	Innings	Runs	Season	Ref.
Kamran Akmal	PZ	11	11	353	2017	
Luke Ronchi	IU	12	12	435	2018	
Shane Watson	QG	12	12	430	2019	
Babar Azam	KK	12	11	473	2020	
Babar Azam	KK	11	11	554	2021	
Fakhar Zaman	LQ	13	13	588	2022	
Mohammad Rizwan	MS	12	12	550	2023	
Babar Azam	PZ	11	11	569	2024	
Hassan Nawaz	QG	13	13	399	2025	
Babar Azam	PZ	11	11	588	2026	

Keys

- Green cap and Hanif Mohammad award was first introduced in 2017 Season.

=== Maroon cap and Fazal Mehmood award for best bowler of the season ===
Bowler	Team	Matches	Innings	Wickets	Season	Ref.
Sohail Khan	KK	9	9	16	2017	
Faheem Ashraf	IU	12	12	18	2018	
Hasan Ali	PZ	13	13	25	2019	
Shaheen Afridi	LQ	12	12	17	2020	
Shahnawaz Dhani	MS	11	11	20	2021	
Shaheen Afridi	LQ	13	13	20	2022	
Abbas Afridi	MS	11	11	23	2023	
Usama Mir	MS	12	12	24	2024	
Shaheen Afridi	LQ	13	12	19	2025	
Sufiyan Muqeem	PZ	11	11	22	2026	

Keys

- Maroon cap and Fazal Mahmood award was first introduced in 2017 Season.

=== Imtiaz Ahmed award for best wicket-keeper of the season ===
Wicket-keeper	Team	Matches	Innings	Total dismissals	Catches	Stumpings	Season	Ref.
Kamran Akmal	PZ	11	10	12	7	5	2017	
Kumar Sangakkara	MS	10	9	10	9	1	2018	
Luke Ronchi	IU	12	12	11	10	1	2019	
Ben Dunk	LQ	11	8	9	9	0	2020	
Mohammad Rizwan	MS	12	12	20	18	2	2021	
Mohammad Rizwan	MS	12	12	9	7	2	2022	
Mohammad Rizwan	MS	12	12	14	13	1	2023	
Azam Khan	IU	12	12	10	9	1	2024	
Muhammad Haris	PZ	10	10	12	12	0	2025	
Kusal Mendis	PZ	11	9	8	6	2	2026	

Keys

- Imtiaz Ahmed award was first introduced in 2017 Season.

=== Player of the match (final) and series ===
Season	Player of the match in finals	Team	Player of the series	Team	Ref.
2016	Dwayne Smith	IU	Ravi Bopara	KK	
2017	Darren Sammy	PZ	Kamran Akmal	PZ	
2018	Luke Ronchi	IU	Luke Ronchi	IU	
2019	Mohammad Hasnain	QG	Shane Watson	QG	
2020	Babar Azam	KK	Babar Azam	KK	
2021	Sohaib Maqsood	MS	Sohaib Maqsood	MS	
2022	Mohammad Hafeez	LQ	Mohammad Rizwan	MS	
2023	Shaheen Afridi	LQ	Ihsanullah	MS	
2024	Imad Wasim	IU	Shadab Khan	IU	
2025	Kusal Perera	LQ	Hassan Nawaz	QG	
2026	Aaron Hardie	PZ	Sufiyan Muqeem	PZ	

== See also ==
- List of Pakistan Super League centuries
