= 2023 Pakistan Super League =

8th edition of the Pakistan Super League

2023 Pakistan Super League پاکستان سپر لیگ ۲۰۲۳
- Official logo of HBL PSL 8 (Note: Official nomenclature)
- Dates: 13 February – 18 March 2023
- Administrator: Pakistan Cricket Board
- Cricket format: Twenty20
- Tournament format(s): Double round robin and playoffs
- Champions: Lahore Qalandars (2nd title)
- Runners-up: Multan Sultans
- Participants: 6
- Matches: 34
- Player of the series: Ihsanullah (MS) (22 wickets)
- Most runs: Mohammad Rizwan (MS) (550)
- Most wickets: Abbas Afridi (MS) (23)
- Official website: psl-t20.com

The 2023 Pakistan Super League (branded as HBL PSL 8) was the eighth edition of the Pakistan Super League, a professional Twenty20 cricket league organized by the Pakistan Cricket Board (PCB). Then PCB chairman Ramiz Raja had hinted at an auction-based system to replace the draft for the 2023 season but a draft was retained. The draft for the tournament was held on 15 December in Karachi. A total of 36 foreign players were picked alongside local players. Lahore Qalandars were the defending champions.

The tournament was to be played between 13 February to 19 March 2023, However, on 16 March 2023, PCB moved forward the final by a day to 18 March 2023 due to bad weather forecast predicted in Lahore, with 19 and 20 March set as reserve days.

In the final, Lahore Qalandars defeated Multan Sultans by a minor margin of 1 run to become the first team in the PSL to defend their title.

== Squads ==
In November 2022, the retained player's list was announced. Squads for the tournament were finalized on 15 December with the final draft.

Islamabad United	Karachi Kings	Lahore Qalandars	Multan Sultans	Peshawar Zalmi	Quetta Gladiators
Shadab Khan (c); Asif Ali (vc); Azam Khan; Hasan Ali; Faheem Ashraf; Mohammad Wasim; Colin Munro; Paul Stirling; Alex Hales; Rahmanullah Gurbaz; Fazalhaq Farooqi; Abrar Ahmed; Sohaib Maqsood; Rumman Raees; Zeeshan Zameer; Hassan Nawaz; Moeen Ali; Mubasir Khan; Tom Curran; Zafar Gohar; Gus Atkinson; Tymal Mills; Rassie van der Dussen	Imad Wasim (c); Mohammad Amir; Aamer Yamin; Sharjeel Khan; Qasim Akram; ~~Mir Hamza~~ (Note: Player suffered an injury which ruled them out of the tournament.); Shoaib Malik; Haider Ali; Matthew Wade; Imran Tahir; James Fuller; Andrew Tye; Tayyab Tahir; Muhammad Akhlaq; Irfan Khan; Mohammad Umar; Ben Cutting; Muhammad Musa; Faisal Akram; Adam Rossington; Akif Javed	Shaheen Afridi (c); David Wiese (vc); Haris Rauf; Rashid Khan; Abdullah Shafique; Kamran Ghulam; ~~Harry Brook~~ (Note: Player withdrew from the tournament due to international duty.); Zaman Khan; Fakhar Zaman; Hussain Talat; Sikandar Raza; ~~Liam Dawson~~; Dilbar Hussain; Mirza Tahir Baig; Ahmed Daniyal; Shawaiz Irfan; Ahsan Hafeez; Jalat Khan; Sam Billings; ~~Kusal Mendis~~ (Note: Player was unable to participate due to NOC issues.); Shane Dadswell; Shai Hope	Mohammad Rizwan (c); Shan Masood (vc); ~~Shahnawaz Dahani~~; Khushdil Shah; Rilee Rossouw; Tim David; Abbas Afridi; Ihsanullah; David Miller; ~~Josh Little~~; Akeal Hosein; Usama Mir; Usman Khan; Sameen Gul; Anwar Ali; Mohammad Sarwar; ~~Adil Rashid~~; Arafat Minhas; Kieron Pollard; Amad Butt; Izharulhaq Naveed; ~~Wayne Parnell~~; Mohammad Ilyas; Carlos Brathwaite; Sheldon Cottrell	Babar Azam (c); Wahab Riaz (vc); Tom Kohler-Cadmore; ~~Sherfane Rutherford~~; Salman Irshad; Mohammad Haris; Aamer Jamal; Bhanuka Rajapaksa; Danish Aziz; Arshad Iqbal; Usman Qadir; Saim Ayub; Sufiyan Muqeem; Haseebullah Khan; James Neesham; Khurram Shahzad; Haris Sohail; Shakib Al Hasan; Richard Gleeson; Peter Hatzoglou; Azmatullah Omarzai; Dasun Shanaka; Saad Masood	Sarfaraz Ahmed (c); Mohammad Nawaz (vc); Iftikhar Ahmed; Jason Roy; Mohammad Hasnain; Umar Akmal; Will Smeed; ~~Wanindu Hasaranga~~; Naseem Shah; Odean Smith; ~~Ahsan Ali~~; Umaid Asif; Mohammad Zahid; Abdul Bangalzai; Aimal Khan; Martin Guptill; Omair Yousuf; Qais Ahmad; Saud Shakeel; Nuwan Thushara; Dwaine Pretorius; ~~Will Jacks~~; Mohammad Hafeez; Yasir Khan; Najibullah Zadran; Bismillah Khan

== Venues ==
The Pakistan Cricket Board announced plans to hold matches in Multan, Peshawar, Lahore and Karachi during the 2023 season. Lahore and Karachi were only the venues in 2022. The Arbab Niaz Stadium in Peshawar was declared unfit to hold any matches in the tournament. Quetta's Bugti Stadium was later added to the list of PSL venues but was removed shortly after due to logistical reasons. The PCB considered moving the matches in Lahore and Rawalpindi to Karachi after a dispute with the Punjab government over the cost of security arrangements but did not do so after the dispute was resolved.

Multan	Karachi	Lahore	Rawalpindi
Multan Cricket Stadium	National Bank Cricket Arena	Gaddafi Stadium	Rawalpindi Cricket Stadium
Capacity: 35,000	Capacity: 34,000	Capacity: 27,000	Capacity: 15,000
Matches: 5	Matches: 9	Matches: 9	Matches: 11
2023 Pakistan Super League is located in Pakistan

== Match officials ==
On 7 February, PCB announced the list of officials for league stage matches which included 3 Elite Panel of ICC Umpires out of 14.

=== Umpires ===
- Ahsan Raza
- Aleem Dar
- Alex Wharf
- Asif Yaqoob
- Faisal Afridi
- Martin Saggers
- Michael Gough
- Mohammad Asif
- Nasir Hussain
- Rashid Riaz
- Richard Illingworth
- Ruchira Palliyaguruge
- Shozab Raza
- Tariq Rasheed

=== Referees ===
- Ali Naqvi
- Iftikhar Ahmed
- Muhammad Javed
- Mohammad Anees
- Roshan Mahanama

== Marketing ==
The season's logo variant was unveiled on 26 January with the hashtags #HBLPSL8 and #SabSitarayHamaray being used for promotion on social media; latter being the official anthem. Previously, the slogan for this season had been 'Soch Hai Apki' but was later changed.

== Trophy ==
The trophy for this season, named Supernova, was unveiled on 9 February 2023. It was entirely made in Pakistan by Lahore-based Mahfooz Jewellers.

== League stage ==
=== Format ===
Each team played every other team twice in the league stage of the tournament in a double round robin. Following the group stage, the top four teams qualified for the playoff stage of the tournament.

=== Points table ===
Pos	Team	Pld	W	L	NR	Pts	NRR
1	Lahore Qalandars (C)	10	7	3	0	14	0.915
2	Multan Sultans (R)	10	6	4	0	12	0.500
3	Islamabad United (4th)	10	6	4	0	12	−0.708
4	Peshawar Zalmi (3rd)	10	5	5	0	10	−0.452
5	Karachi Kings	10	3	7	0	6	0.756
6	Quetta Gladiators	10	3	7	0	6	−1.066

Source: ESPNcricinfo
- The top 4 teams qualified for the playoffs.
- Advances to Qualifier.
- Advances to Eliminator 1.

Notes:

- C = Champions;
- R = Runner-up;
- (x) = Position at the end of the tournament

=== Summary ===
Visitor team →	IU	KK	LQ	MS	PZ	QG
Home team ↓	IU	KK	LQ	MS	PZ	QG
Islamabad United		Islamabad; 6 wickets	Lahore; 119 runs	Islamabad; 2 wickets	Peshawar; 13 runs	Islamabad; 2 wickets
Karachi Kings	Islamabad; 4 wickets		Karachi; 67 runs	Karachi; 66 runs	Peshawar; 2 runs	Quetta; 6 runs
Lahore Qalandars	Lahore; 110 runs	Karachi; 86 runs		Lahore; 21 runs	Lahore; 40 runs	Lahore; 17 runs
Multan Sultans	Multan; 52 runs	Multan; 3 runs	Lahore; 1 run		Multan; 56 runs	Multan; 9 wickets
Peshawar Zalmi	Islamabad; 6 wickets	Peshawar; 24 runs	Peshawar; 35 runs	Multan; 4 wickets		Quetta; 8 wickets
Quetta Gladiators	Islamabad; 63 runs	Quetta; 4 wickets	Lahore; 63 runs	Multan; 9 runs	Peshawar; 4 wickets	

Home team won	Visitor team won

- Note: Results listed are according to the home (horizontal) and visitor (vertical) teams.
- Note: Click on a result to see a summary of the match.

=== League progression ===
Team	Group matches										Playoffs		
Team	1	2	3	4	5	6	7	8	9	10	E1/Q	E2	F
Islamabad United	2	2	4	6	6	8	10	12	12	12	L		
Karachi Kings	0	0	0	2	2	4	4	4	4	6			
Lahore Qalandars	2	2	4	6	8	10	12	12	14	14	L	W	W
Multan Sultans	0	2	4	6	8	8	8	8	10	12	W		L
Peshawar Zalmi	2	2	4	4	4	6	8	8	8	10	W	L	
Quetta Gladiators	0	2	2	2	2	2	2	4	6	6			

Win	Loss	No result

- Note: The total points at the end of each group match are listed.
- Note: Click on the points (group matches) or W/L (playoffs) to see the match summary.

== Fixtures ==
The PCB announced the fixtures on 20 January 2023. An exhibition match was played between Peshawar Zalmi and Quetta Gladiators before the start of league at the Bugti Stadium and was won by the Gladiators by 3 runs.

=== Karachi and Multan ===
Match 1
13 February 2023
20:30 (N)
Scorecard

Lahore Qalandars; 175/6 (20 overs)	v	Multan Sultans (H); 174/6 (20 overs)
Fakhar Zaman 66 (42); Usama Mir 2/25 (4 overs)		Mohammad Rizwan 75 (50); Hussain Talat 1/16 (2 overs)

Lahore Qalandars won by 1 run
Multan Cricket Stadium, Multan
Umpires: Martin Saggers (Eng) and Asif Yaqoob (Pak)
Player of the match: Fakhar Zaman (Lahore Qalandars)

- Multan Sultans won the toss and elected to field.
- Mirza Tahir Baig (Lahore Qalandars) made his T20 debut.

Match 2
14 February 2023
20:00 (N)
Scorecard

Peshawar Zalmi; 199/5 (20 overs)	v	Karachi Kings (H); 197/5 (20 overs)
Tom Kohler-Cadmore 92 (50); Mir Hamza 1/13 (2 overs)		Imad Wasim 80* (47); James Neesham 2/26 (4 overs)

Peshawar Zalmi won by 2 runs
National Stadium, Karachi
Umpires: Ahsan Raza (Pak) and Alex Wharf (Eng)
Player of the match: Tom Kohler-Cadmore (Peshawar Zalmi)

- Karachi Kings won the toss and elected to field.
- Sufiyan Muqeem and Khurram Shahzad (Peshawar Zalmi) both made their T20 debuts.

Match 3
15 February 2023
18:00 (N)
Scorecard

Quetta Gladiators; 110 (18.5 overs)	v	Multan Sultans (H); 111/1 (13.3 overs)
Jason Roy 27 (18); Ihsanullah 5/12 (4 overs)		Rilee Rossouw 78* (42); Nuwan Thushara 1/21 (2 overs)

Multan Sultans won by 9 wickets
Multan Cricket Stadium, Multan
Umpires: Faisal Afridi (Pak) and Asif Yaqoob (Pak)
Player of the match: Ihsanullah (Multan Sultans)

- Multan Sultans won the toss and elected to field.

Match 4
16 February 2023
19:00 (N)
Scorecard

(H) Karachi Kings; 173/7 (20 overs)	v	Islamabad United; 178/6 (18.2 overs)
Haider Ali 59 (45); Rumman Raees 2/26 (4 overs)		Colin Munro 58 (28); Mohammad Amir 2/30 (4 overs)

Islamabad United won by 4 wickets
National Stadium, Karachi
Umpires: Ruchira Palliyaguruge (SL) and Alex Wharf (Eng)
Player of the match: Colin Munro (Islamabad United)

- Islamabad United won the toss and elected to field.

Match 5
17 February 2023
18:00 (N)
Scorecard

(H) Multan Sultans; 210/3 (20 overs)	v	Peshawar Zalmi; 154 (18.5 overs)
Rilee Rossouw 75 (36); Salman Irshad 2/38 (4 overs)		Saim Ayub 53 (37); Usama Mir 3/22 (4 overs)

Multan Sultans won by 56 runs
Multan Cricket Stadium, Multan
Umpires: Faisal Afridi (Pak) and Asif Yaqoob (Pak)
Player of the match: Rilee Rossouw (Multan Sultans)

- Peshawar Zalmi won the toss and elected to field.

Match 6
18 February 2023
19:00 (N)
Scorecard

Quetta Gladiators; 168/7 (20 overs)	v	Karachi Kings (H); 162/5 (20 overs)
Martin Guptill 117 (67); Imad Wasim 3/16 (4 overs)		Shoaib Malik 71* (49); Mohammad Hasnain 2/29 (4 overs)

Quetta Gladiators won by 6 runs
National Stadium, Karachi
Umpires: Ahsan Raza (Pak) and Alex Wharf (Eng)
Player of the match: Martin Guptill (Quetta Gladiators)

- Karachi Kings won the toss and elected to field.

Match 7
19 February 2023
14:00
Scorecard

(H) Multan Sultans; 190/4 (20 overs)	v	Islamabad United; 138 (17.5 overs)
David Miller 52 (25); Rumman Raees 1/25 (3 overs)		Rassie van der Dussen 49 (32); Abbas Afridi 4/22 (3 overs)

Multan Sultans won by 52 runs
Multan Cricket Stadium, Multan
Umpires: Faisal Afridi (Pak) and Asif Yaqoob (Pak)
Player of the match: Abbas Afridi (Multan Sultans)

- Islamabad United won the toss and elected to field.

Match 8
19 February 2023
19:00 (N)
Scorecard

(H) Karachi Kings; 185/5 (20 overs)	v	Lahore Qalandars; 118 (17.3 overs)
James Vince 46 (36); Liam Dawson 1/30 (3 overs)		Mirza Tahir Baig 45 (39); Akif Javed 4/28 (3.3 overs)

Karachi Kings won by 67 runs
National Stadium, Karachi
Umpires: Ahsan Raza (Pak) and Alex Wharf (Eng)
Player of the match: Imad Wasim (Karachi Kings)

- Lahore Qalandars won the toss and elected to field.

Match 9
20 February 2023
19:00 (N)
Scorecard

Quetta Gladiators; 154/4 (20 overs)	v	Peshawar Zalmi; 157/6 (18.3 overs)
Iftikhar Ahmed 50* (34); Usman Qadir 2/26 (4 overs)		James Neesham 38 (23); Mohammad Hasnain 3/13 (4 overs)

Peshawar Zalmi won by 4 wickets
National Stadium, Karachi
Umpires: Alex Wharf (Eng) and Ruchira Palliyaguruge (SL)
Player of the match: James Neesham (Peshawar Zalmi)

- Peshawar Zalmi won the toss and elected to field.

Match 10
21 February 2023
19:00 (N)
Scorecard

Lahore Qalandars; 198/6 (20 overs)	v	Quetta Gladiators; 135/8 (20 overs)
Shai Hope 47 (32); Qais Ahmad 2/36 (4 overs)		Jason Roy 48 (30); Shaheen Afridi 3/22 (4 overs)

Lahore Qalandars won by 63 runs
National Stadium, Karachi
Umpires: Alex Wharf (Eng) and Ruchira Palliyaguruge (SL)
Player of the match: Shaheen Afridi (Lahore Qalandars)

- Quetta Gladiators won the toss and elected to field.

Match 11
22 February 2023
19:00 (N)
Scorecard

(H) Multan Sultans; 196/2 (20 overs)	v	Karachi Kings; 193/5 (20 overs)
Mohammed Rizwan 110* (64); Shoaib Malik 1/29 (4 overs)		James Vince 75 (34); Abbas Afridi 2/55 (4 overs)

Multan Sultans won by 3 runs
Multan Cricket Stadium, Multan
Umpires: Martin Saggers (Eng) and Shozab Raza (Pak)
Player of the match: Mohammed Rizwan (Multan Sultans)

- Karachi Kings won the toss and elected to field.

Match 12
23 February 2023
19:00 (N)
Scorecard

Peshawar Zalmi; 156/8 (20 overs)	v	Islamabad United; 159/4 (14.5 overs)
Babar Azam 75* (58); Hasan Ali 3/35 (4 overs)		Rahmanullah Gurbaz 62 (31); James Neesham 1/21 (2 overs)

Islamabad United won by 6 wickets
National Stadium, Karachi
Umpires: Michael Gough (Eng) and Richard Illingworth (Eng)
Player of the match: Hasan Ali (Islamabad United)

- Islamabad United won the toss and elected to field.

Match 13
24 February 2023
19:00 (N)
Scorecard

Islamabad United; 220/6 (20 overs)	v	Quetta Gladiators; 157 (19.1 overs)
Azam Khan 97 (42); Odean Smith 2/41 (4 overs)		Mohammad Hafeez 48 (26); Fazalhaq Farooqi 3/28 (3.1 overs)

Islamabad United won by 63 runs
National Stadium, Karachi
Umpires: Michael Gough (Eng) and Rashid Riaz (Pak)
Player of the match: Azam Khan (Islamabad United)

- Islamabad United won the toss and elected to bat.
- Aimal Khan (Quetta Gladiators) made his T20 debut.

Match 14
26 February 2023
14:00
Scorecard

(H) Karachi Kings; 167/3 (20 overs)	v	Multan Sultans; 101 (16.3 overs)
Tayyab Tahir 65 (46); Ihsanullah 2/22 (4 overs)		Mohammad Rizwan 29 (25); Shoaib Malik 3/16 (3.3 overs)

Karachi Kings won by 66 runs
National Stadium, Karachi
Umpires: Alex Wharf (Eng) and Ahsan Raza (Pak)
Player of the match: Tabraiz Shamsi (Karachi Kings)

- Multan Sultans won the toss and elected to field.

=== Lahore and Rawalpindi ===
Match 15
26 February 2023
19:00 (N)
Scorecard

(H) Lahore Qalandars; 241/3 (20 overs)	v	Peshawar Zalmi; 201/9 (20 overs)
Fakhar Zaman 96 (45); Wahab Riaz 2/45 (4 overs)		Tom Kohler-Cadmore 55 (23); Shaheen Afridi 5/40 (4 overs)

Lahore Qalandars won by 40 runs
Gaddafi Stadium, Lahore
Umpires: Faisal Afridi (Pak) and Richard Illingworth (Eng)
Player of the match: Fakhar Zaman (Lahore Qalandars)

- Lahore Qalandars won the toss and elected to bat.
- Saad Masood (Peshawar Zalmi) made his T20 debut.

Match 16
27 February 2023
19:00 (N)
Scorecard

(H) Lahore Qalandars; 200/7 (20 overs)	v	Islamabad United; 90 (13.5 overs)
Abdullah Shafique 45 (24); Tom Curran 3/34 (4 overs)		Rahmanullah Gurbaz 23 (17); David Wiese 3/17 (3 overs)

Lahore Qalandars won by 110 runs
Gaddafi Stadium, Lahore
Umpires: Faisal Afridi (Pak) and Michael Gough (Eng)
Player of the match: David Wiese (Lahore Qalandars)

- Lahore Qalandars won the toss and elected to bat.

Match 17
1 March 2023
19:00 (N)
Scorecard

Peshawar Zalmi; 197/5 (20 overs)	v	Karachi Kings; 173/8 (20 overs)
Rovman Powell 64 (34); Mohammad Amir 4/26 (4 overs)		Imad Wasim 57* (30); Azmatullah Omarzai 3/28 (4 overs)

Peshawar Zalmi won by 24 runs
Rawalpindi Cricket Stadium, Rawalpindi
Umpires: Michael Gough (Eng) and Richard Illingworth (Eng)
Player of the match: Rovman Powell (Peshawar Zalmi)

- Karachi Kings won the toss and elected to field.

Match 18
2 March 2023
19:00 (N)
Scorecard

(H) Lahore Qalandars; 148 (19.2 overs)	v	Quetta Gladiators; 131/7 (20 overs)
Sikandar Raza 71* (34); Mohammed Nawaz 2/19 (3 overs)		Will Smeed 32 (25); Haris Rauf 3/22 (4 overs)

Lahore Qalandars won by 17 runs
Gaddafi Stadium, Lahore
Umpires: Ahsan Raza (Pak) and Martin Saggers (Eng)
Player of the match: Sikandar Raza (Lahore Qalandars)

- Quetta Gladiators won the toss and elected to field.

Match 19
3 March 2023
19:00 (N)
Scorecard

Karachi Kings; 201/5 (20 overs)	v	Islamabad United (H); 204/4 (19.2 overs)
Imad Wasim 92* (54); Tom Curran 2/43 (4 overs)		Azam Khan 72* (41); Mohammad Amir 1/40 (4 overs); Tabraiz Shamsi 1/40 (4 overs)

Islamabad United won by 6 wickets
Rawalpindi Cricket Stadium, Rawalpindi
Umpires: Michael Gough (Eng) and Richard Illingworth (Eng)
Player of the match: Azam Khan (Islamabad United)

- Karachi Kings won the toss and elected to bat.

Match 20
4 March 2023
19:00 (N)
Scorecard

(H) Lahore Qalandars; 180/9 (20 overs)	v	Multan Sultans; 159/7 (20 overs)
Sam Billings 54 (35); Kieron Pollard 2/16 (2 overs)		Kieron Pollard 39 (28); Rashid Khan 3/15 (4 overs)

Lahore Qalandars won by 21 runs
Gaddafi Stadium, Lahore
Umpires: Faisal Afridi (Pak) and Martin Saggers (Eng)
Player of the match: Rashid Khan (Lahore Qalandars)

- Lahore Qalandars won the toss and elected to bat.
- As a result of this match, Lahore Qalandars qualified for the playoffs.

Match 21
5 March 2023
19:00 (N)
Scorecard

Quetta Gladiators; 179/6 (20 overs)	v	Islamabad United (H); 183/8 (19.3 overs)
Najibullah Zadran 59 (34); Fazalhaq Farooqi 3/25 (4 overs)		Colin Munro 63 (29); Umaid Asif 3/37 (4 overs)

Islamabad United won by 2 wickets
Rawalpindi Cricket Stadium, Rawalpindi
Umpires: Aleem Dar (Pak) and Rashid Riaz (Pak)
Player of the match: Fazalhaq Farooqi (Islamabad United)

- Islamabad United won the toss and elected to field.
- As a result of this match, Islamabad United qualified for the playoffs.

Match 22
6 March 2023
19:00 (N)
Scorecard

Karachi Kings; 164/6 (20 overs)	v	Quetta Gladiators; 168/6 (19.5 overs)
Adam Rossington 69 (45); Aimal Khan 2/26 (4 overs)		Martin Guptill 86* (56); Tabraiz Shamsi 2/20 (4 overs)

Quetta Gladiators won by 4 wickets
Rawalpindi Cricket Stadium, Rawalpindi
Umpires: Martin Saggers (Eng) and Rashid Riaz (Pak)
Player of the match: Martin Guptill (Quetta Gladiators)

- Quetta Gladiators won the toss and elected to field.

Match 23
7 March 2023
14:00
Scorecard

Peshawar Zalmi; 207 (19.3 overs)	v	Lahore Qalandars; 172 (19.4 overs)
Saim Ayub 68 (36); Shaheen Afridi 4/31 (4 overs)		Hussain Talat 63 (37); Wahab Riaz 3/17 (4 overs)

Peshawar Zalmi won by 35 runs
Rawalpindi Cricket Stadium, Rawalpindi
Umpires: Alex Wharf (Eng) and Asif Yaqoob (Pak)
Player of the match: Saim Ayub (Peshawar Zalmi)

- Peshawar Zalmi won the toss and elected to bat.
- Shawaiz Irfan (Lahore Qalandars) made his T20 debut.

Match 24
7 March 2023
19:00 (N)
Scorecard

Multan Sultans; 205/5 (20 overs)	v	Islamabad United (H); 209/8 (19.5 overs)
Shan Masood 75 (50); Shadab Khan 2/26 (4 overs)		Faheem Ashraf 51* (26); Anwar Ali 3/33 (4 overs)

Islamabad United won by 2 wickets
Rawalpindi Cricket Stadium, Rawalpindi
Umpires: Faisal Afridi (Pak) and Rashid Riaz (Pak)
Player of the match: Faheem Ashraf (Islamabad United)

- Islamabad United won the toss and elected to field.

Match 25
8 March 2023
19:00 (N)
Scorecard

Peshawar Zalmi; 240/2 (20 overs)	v	Quetta Gladiators; 243/2 (18.2 overs)
Babar Azam 115 (65); Dwaine Pretorius 1/40 (4 overs)		Jason Roy 145* (63); Mujeeb Ur Rahman 1/38 (4 overs)

Quetta Gladiators won by 8 wickets
Rawalpindi Cricket Stadium, Rawalpindi
Umpires: Ahsan Raza (Pak) and Martin Saggers (Eng)
Player of the match: Jason Roy (Quetta Gladiators)

- Peshawar Zalmi won the toss and elected to bat.
- This was the second highest run-chase in PSL history.

Match 26
9 March 2023
19:00 (N)
Scorecard

Lahore Qalandars; 226/5 (20 overs)	v	Islamabad United (H); 107 (15.1 overs)
Fakhar Zaman 115 (57); Fazalhaq Farooqi 3/40 (4 overs)		Hasan Ali 18 (13); Rashid Khan 4/21 (4 overs)

Lahore Qalandars won by 119 runs
Rawalpindi Cricket Stadium, Rawalpindi
Umpires: Faisal Afridi (Pak) and Aleem Dar (Pak)
Player of the match: Fakhar Zaman (Lahore Qalandars)

- Lahore Qalandars won the toss and elected to bat.
- This was the largest victory in PSL history in terms of runs.

Match 27
10 March 2023
19:00 (N)
Scorecard

Peshawar Zalmi; 242/6 (20 overs)	v	Multan Sultans; 244/6 (19.1 overs)
Babar Azam 73 (39); Abbas Afridi 4/39 (4 overs)		Rilee Rossouw 121 (51); Azmatullah Omarzai 2/61 (4 overs)

Multan Sultans won by 4 wickets
Rawalpindi Cricket Stadium, Rawalpindi
Umpires: Ahsan Raza (Pak) and Martin Saggers (Eng)
Player of the match: Rilee Rossouw (Multan Sultans)

- Peshawar Zalmi won the toss and elected to bat.
- This was the highest run-chase in PSL history.
- As a result of this match, Multan Sultans qualified for the playoffs.

Match 28
11 March 2023
19:00 (N)
Scorecard

Multan Sultans; 262/3 (20 overs)	v	Quetta Gladiators; 253/8 (20 overs)
Usman Khan 120 (43); Qais Ahmad 2/77 (4 overs)		Omair Yousuf 67 (36); Abbas Afridi 5/47 (4 overs)

Multan Sultans won by 9 runs
Rawalpindi Cricket Stadium, Rawalpindi
Umpires: Alex Wharf (Eng) and Martin Saggers (Eng)
Player of the match: Abbas Afridi (Multan Sultans)

- Quetta Gladiators won the toss and elected to field.
- Usman Khan (Multan Sultans) scored the fastest century in terms of balls (36) in PSL history.
- This was the highest total scored by a team in PSL history.
- Abbas Afridi (Multan Sultans) took a hat-trick.
- As a result of this match, Peshawar Zalmi qualified for the playoffs.

Match 29
12 March 2023
14:00
Scorecard

Peshawar Zalmi; 179/8 (20 overs)	v	Islamabad United (H); 166 (19.4 overs)
Mohammad Haris 79 (39); Hasan Ali 3/39 (4 overs)		Faheem Ashraf 38 (13); Khurram Shahzad 3/13 (1.4 overs)

Peshawar Zalmi won by 13 runs
Rawalpindi Cricket Stadium, Rawalpindi
Umpires: Ahsan Raza (Pak) and Martin Saggers (Eng)
Player of the match: Mohammad Haris (Peshawar Zalmi)

- Islamabad United won the toss and elected to field.

Match 30
12 March 2023
19:00 (N)
Scorecard

Karachi Kings; 196/7 (20 overs)	v	Lahore Qalandars (H); 110 (18.5 overs)
Muhammad Akhlaq 51 (36); Hussain Talat 2/24 (3 overs)		Hussain Talat 25 (25); Akif Javed 2/8 (3 overs)

Karachi Kings won by 86 runs
Gaddafi Stadium, Lahore
Umpires: Aleem Dar (Pak) and Rashid Riaz (Pak)
Player of the match: Muhammad Akhlaq (Karachi Kings)

- Karachi Kings won the toss and elected to bat.

== Playoffs ==
Qualifier and Eliminator 1
15 March — Lahore
2	Multan Sultans	160/5 (20 overs)
1	Lahore Qalandars	76 (14.3 overs)
16 March — Lahore
4	Peshawar Zalmi	183/8 (20 overs)
3	Islamabad United	171/6 (20 overs)

Eliminator 2
17 March — Lahore
4	Peshawar Zalmi	171/5 (20 overs)
1	Lahore Qalandars	176/6 (18.5 overs)

Final
18 March — Lahore
1	Lahore Qalandars	200/6 (20 overs)
2	Multan Sultans	199/8 (20 overs)

=== Qualifier ===
Match 31
15 March 2023
19:00 (N)
Scorecard

Multan Sultans; 160/5 (20 overs)	v	Lahore Qalandars (H); 76 (14.3 overs)
Kieron Pollard 57 (34); Haris Rauf 3/34 (4 overs)		Sam Billings 19 (27); Sheldon Cottrell 3/20 (3 overs)

Multan Sultans won by 84 runs
Gaddafi Stadium, Lahore
Umpires: Aleem Dar (Pak) and Alex Wharf (Eng)
Player of the match: Kieron Pollard (Multan Sultans)

- Multan Sultans won the toss and elected to bat.

=== Eliminators ===
==== Eliminator 1 ====
Match 32
16 March 2023
19:00 (N)
Scorecard

Peshawar Zalmi; 183/8 (20 overs)	v	Islamabad United; 171/6 (20 overs)
Babar Azam 64 (39); Shadab Khan 2/40 (4 overs)		Sohaib Maqsood 60 (48); Salman Irshad 2/18 (4 overs)

Peshawar Zalmi won by 12 runs
Gaddafi Stadium, Lahore
Umpires: Faisal Afridi (Pak) and Ahsan Raza (Pak)
Player of the match: Aamer Jamal (Peshawar Zalmi)

- Islamabad United won the toss and elected to field.

==== Eliminator 2 ====
Match 33
17 March 2023
19:00 (N)
Scorecard

Peshawar Zalmi; 171/5 (20 overs)	v	Lahore Qalandars (H); 176/6 (18.5 overs)
Mohammad Haris 85 (54); Zaman Khan 2/20 (3 overs)		Mirza Tahir Baig 54 (42); Azmatullah Omarzai 2/30 (4 overs)

Lahore Qalandars won by 4 wickets
Gaddafi Stadium, Lahore
Umpires: Ahsan Raza (Pak) and Martin Saggers (Eng)
Player of the match: Mirza Tahir Baig (Lahore Qalandars)

- Peshawar Zalmi won the toss and elected to bat.
- Ahsan Hafeez (Lahore Qalandars) made his T20 debut.

=== Final ===
Match 34
18 March 2023
19:00 (N)
Scorecard

(H) Lahore Qalandars; 200/6 (20 overs)	v	Multan Sultans; 199/8 (20 overs)
Abdullah Shafique 65 (40); Usama Mir 3/24 (3 overs)		Rilee Rossouw 52 (32); Shaheen Afridi 4/51 (4 overs)

Lahore Qalandars won by 1 run
Gaddafi Stadium, Lahore
Umpires: Alex Wharf (Eng) and Rashid Riaz (Pak)
Player of the match: Shaheen Afridi (Lahore Qalandars)

- Lahore Qalandars won the toss and elected to bat.
- By winning in the final, Lahore Qalandars became the first team in PSL history to defend their title.

== Awards and statistics ==
Abbas Afridi, the leading wicket taker of the tournament, was awarded with the Fazal Mahmood Cap, and Mohammad Rizwan, the leading runs scorer, was awarded with the Hanif Mohammad Cap.

=== Most runs ===
Player	Team	Runs
Mohammad Rizwan	Multan Sultans	550
Babar Azam	Peshawar Zalmi	522
Rilee Rossouw	Multan Sultans	453
Fakhar Zaman	Lahore Qalandars	429
Imad Wasim	Karachi Kings	404

- Source: ESPNcricinfo

=== Most wickets ===
Player	Team	Wickets
Abbas Afridi	Multan Sultans	23
Ihsanullah	Multan Sultans	22
Rashid Khan	Lahore Qalandars	20
Shaheen Afridi	Lahore Qalandars	19
Usama Mir	Multan Sultans	17

- Source: ESPNcricinfo

=== End of season awards ===
Name	Team	Award	Prize
Ihsanullah	Multan Sultans	Player of the Tournament	Rs. 30 lakh (US$10,645)
Mohammad Rizwan	Multan Sultans	Batsman of the tournament	Rs. 30 lakh (US$10,645)
Ihsanullah	Multan Sultans	Bowler of the tournament	Rs. 30 lakh (US$10,645)
Imad Wasim	Karachi Kings	All-rounder of the tournament	Rs. 30 lakh (US$10,645)
Mohammad Rizwan	Multan Sultans	Wicket-keeper of the tournament	Rs. 30 lakh (US$10,645)
Kieron Pollard	Multan Sultans	Fielder of the tournament	Rs. 30 lakh (US$10,645)
Abbas Afridi	Multan Sultans	Emerging player of the tournament	Rs. 30 lakh (US$10,645)
Alex Wharf	—N/a	Umpire of the tournament	Rs. 30 lakh (US$10,645)
—N/a	Peshawar Zalmi	Spirit of cricket	Rs. 30 lakh (US$10,645)

- Source: Geo Super, CricTracker

=== Team of the tournament ===
Players
- Mohammad Rizwan
- Babar Azam
- Mohammad Haris
- Rilee Rossouw
- Azam Khan
- Kieron Pollard
- Imad Wasim
- Shaheen Afridi (c)
- Rashid Khan
- Abbas Afridi
- Ihsanullah
- Saim Ayub (12th man)

- Source: PCB, GeoSuperTV
