= Pakistan Super League =

Professional Pakistani Twenty20 cricket league

- Countries: Pakistan
- Administrator: Pakistan Cricket Board
- Headquarters: Gaddafi Stadium
- Format: Twenty20
- First edition: 2016
- Latest edition: 2026
- Next edition: 2027
- Tournament format: Double round-robin and Playoffs
- Number of teams: 8
- Current champion: Peshawar Zalmi (2nd title)
- Most successful: Islamabad United; Lahore Qalandars (3 titles each)
- Most runs: Babar Azam (4,380)
- Most wickets: Hasan Ali (140)
- TV: Pakistan; PTV Sports; A Sports; Ten Sports; International; List of broadcasters
- Website: psl-t20.com

The Pakistan Super League (PSL), also known as HBL PSL for sponsorship reasons, is a professional Twenty20 (T20) cricket league in Pakistan, organised by the Pakistan Cricket Board (PCB).

The league was founded by the PCB in 2015, and as of 2026 features eight city-based franchise teams. Instead of operating as an association of independently owned teams, the league operates as a single entity in which each franchise is owned and controlled by investors.

Each team plays group-stage matches in a double round-robin format, with the top four teams qualifying for the playoffs, culminating in the final.

The 2026 Pakistan Super League was the eleventh season of the league. Islamabad United and Lahore Qalandars are the most successful teams, with three titles each, followed by Peshawar Zalmi with two titles.

== History ==
=== Establishment ===
In September 2015, the Pakistan Cricket Board officially announced the launch of the PSL. Former Pakistani national team captains Wasim Akram and Rameez Raja signed up to promote the PSL and become brand ambassadors of the league for three years. After several years of planning and two previous failed attempts, the league officially began on 4 February 2016 in the United Arab Emirates. The UAE sports minister, Nahyan bin Mubarak Al Nahyan, inaugurated the opening ceremony. The first two seasons included five teams based on the capital cities of Pakistan's provinces and the Federal capital. In its first season the PSL had a higher percentage of international players. The league uses a draft system for player recruitment similar to that used in many North American professional sports leagues and as opposed to the auction system used in some other T20 leagues.

The PSL's official logo was launched on 20 September 2015 in a ceremony in Lahore, and was revealed by 3Di.The ceremony was attended by current and retired cricketers, as well as Pakistani celebrities.

The commercial rights to the initial franchises were sold for US$93 million for a span of 10 years in December 2015. The market value of PSL in 2017 was up to US$300 million according to Arif Habib, and has grown significantly in the years since.

=== Expansion ===
==== Five to Six teams (2018) ====
The league expanded to six franchises with the inclusion of Multan Sultans for the 2018 season. The PCB had shortlisted Faisalabad, FATA, Hyderabad, Dera Murad Jamali and Multan as candidate cities, with several political and regional stakeholders expressing interest in securing representation for their areas. Multan Sultans was announced as the new franchise on 1 June 2017, purchased by Schön Properties for US$5.2 million per year. On 10 November 2018, the PCB terminated the franchise agreement with Schön Properties, after which new owners took control and retained the Multan Sultans name.

==== Six to Eight teams (2026) ====
Following the expiration of the franchise's operating agreement, the Pakistan Cricket Board auctioned the Multan Sultans franchise, which was purchased by Walee Technologies on 9 February 2026 for a bid of PKR 2.45 billion, making it the most expensive franchise sale in PSL history. After they acquisition the owners decided to relocate the franchise to Rawalpindi and rebranded it as Rawalpindiz.

PCB held an auction to sale rights of two more teams and added Sialkot Stallionz and Hyderabad Kingsmen as seventh and eighth team. Later the owners of Sialkot Stallionz sold the franchise to CD Ventures before the start of 2026 season who decided to bring back Multan Sultans as team identity and relocated the franchise from Sialkot to Multan.

=== Trophy ===
From its inception, the Pakistan Super League has featured new trophy designs for most editions. The inaugural 2016 "Shooting Star" trophy was designed by Swarovski and unveiled in Dubai ahead of the first season, followed by the "Spirit Trophy" in 2017 which continued Swarovski's involvement. Similar Swarovski-made trophies were used in the 2018 and 2019 seasons before production shifted to Pakistan.

On 19 February 2020, the first domestically made trophy was unveiled by squash legend Jahangir Khan and PCB chairman Ehsan Mani at the National Stadium, Karachi. The 65-centimetre-tall, eight-kilogram design featuring a crescent and star was used from 2020 to 2022, with each champion's name engraved on its base. In 2023, a new silver-plated "Supernova" trophy, crafted by Lahore-based Mahfooz Jewellers, was introduced at the Shalimar Gardens in Lahore, the first to be fully produced in Pakistan.

The 2025 trophy was called "Luminara", which was revealed on 14 March 2025 through a video on the PSL's official YouTube channel. It incorporated luminous crystal and reflective metalwork to mark a decade of PSL cricket.

The 2026 edition of the Pakistan Super League will feature a new trophy design. The trophy is named "Infinity" and was revealed in ceremony held at National Stadium, Karachi. It is handcrafted by 18 artisans who completed it in 2,600 hours. It features a crescent and a star at the top, The crescent is embedded with 1600 small crystals, There are eight emerald-cut gemstones at the base of the trophy representing the eight PSL franchises.

=== Profits ===
In May 2016, the PCB announced that the inaugural season of the PSL had yielded profits of US$2.6 million. The 2023 edition recorded revenue of Over Rs. 5 Billion. The revenue was accumulated through various sources, including broadcasting rights, title sponsorship, gate money, and other related rights.

== Format ==
PSL playoffs system

The PSL is played in a double round-robin format. Every team plays each other twice and the top four advance to the playoffs. The playoffs use the Page playoff system, like the Indian Premier League.

The league follows the rules and regulations dictated by the International Cricket Council. However, it introduced DRS system in T20s which was later emulated by International Cricket Council as well. In the group stage, two points are awarded for a win, one for a no-result and none for a loss. In the event of tied scores after both teams have faced their quota of overs, a super over is used to determine the match winner. In the group stage teams are ranked on the following criteria:

1. Higher number of points
2. If equal, better run rate
3. If equal, highest number of wins
4. If equal, fewest losses
5. If still equal, the results of head-to-head meeting

In any play-off match in which there is no result, a super over is used to determine the winner. If the super over is not possible or the result of the over is a tie, the team which finished in the highest league position at the end of the regular season is deemed the winner of the match.

== Schedule ==
The PSL traditionally been held between February and March each year, with the only major disruption occurring during the COVID-19 pandemic. The league previously took place before the start of the Indian Premier League. The 2025 season was the last to be held in the traditional February–March slot, during which it overlapped with the IPL for the first time. However, scheduling changes announced by the Pakistan Cricket Board in 2025 confirmed that from the 2026 season onward, the PSL would move to an April–May window to improve overseas player availability and avoid weather disruptions. 2026 Pakistan Super League will start on 26 March and will end on 3 May

== Teams ==
Cities represented by PSL teams

According to a PCB press release, around 20 parties showed an interest in buying franchises for the league before the first season. On 18 October 2015 the Pakistan Cricket Board began accepting tenders for franchises with a deadline for bids of 15 November. Bid winners were granted the rights to a franchise for ten years.

All five franchises for the first season of the league were sold on 3 December 2015, for a total price of US$93 million, after seven bidders presented formal proposals.

In April 2017, the PCB invited bids for a sixth team. As many as 40 national and international parties expressed an interest in buying the sixth franchise and on 1 June the rights to the Multan franchise was bought by Schön Properties for a price of US$5.2 million a year, the most expensive franchise rights in the league. In November 2018, however, the rights were terminated by the PCB due to issues with payments. The rights were resold to a consortium led by Ali Tareen for US$6.35 million.

In November 2025, following the conclusion of the original ten-year agreements, the PCB conducted a re-evaluation of franchise values through Ernst & Young. The financial model was shifted from US dollars to Pakistani Rupees for the next ten-year cycle (2026–2035). Five of the original six franchises renewed their rights under the new valuation terms, with annual fees set at Rs. 670 million for Lahore Qalandars, Rs. 640 million for Karachi Kings, Rs. 490 million for Peshawar Zalmi, Rs. 480 million for Islamabad United, and Rs. 340 million for Quetta Gladiators. In late November 2025, Multan Sultans didn't finalized their renewal agreement with the Pakistan Cricket Board, resulting in the franchise being placed under PCB administration and scheduled for auction on 9 February 2026 ahead of the 2026 season.

The PCB confirmed that the PSL would expand from six to eight teams beginning with the 2026 season, following the expiry of the original franchise agreements after the 2025 edition. In November 2025 the PCB published a shortlist of six candidate cities for the two new franchises: Hyderabad, Rawalpindi, Faisalabad, Gilgit, Muzaffarabad and Sialkot. On 8 January, the new teams were announced to be representing the cities Hyderabad and Sialkot, with FSK and OZ Developers winning the bid with Rs. 1.75 billion and Rs. 1.85 bilion respectively.

Following the 9 February 2026 auction, the Multan Sultans franchise was sold to Walee Technologies for a record PKR 2.45 billion, which subsequently relocated the team to Rawalpindi and rebranded it as Rawalpindiz. However, the Sultans brand returned to the league shortly after when the newly established expansion team, the Sialkot Stallionz, faced immediate financial instability. Following the reported bankruptcy of original owners OZ Developers, Syed Mohammad Gohar Hussain Shah of CD Ventures acquired a 99% stake in the Sialkot franchise in February 2026 to stabilize the team ahead of its debut.

On 3 March 2026, the Pakistan Cricket Board officially approved Shah's request to rebrand the Sialkot entity as the Multan Sultans, citing his desire to restore South Punjab's representation in the league. The transition involved increasing the annual franchise fee from PKR 1.85 billion to PKR 2 billion, alongside a one-time US$1 million name-change fee. Under the new management, Shah introduced a Total Cricket philosophy and appointed Ashton Turner as captain to lead the rebranded team for the 2026 season.

=== Current teams ===
Team	City	Owner	Home ground	Founded	Captain	Coach
Hyderabad Kingsmen	Hyderabad	FKS Group	Niaz Stadium, Hyderabad	2026 (Note: The team was founded in 2026 and made its PSL debut in the same year.)	Marnus Labuschagne	Jason Gillespie
Islamabad United	Islamabad	Leonine Global Sports	Islamabad Cricket Stadium, Islamabad (planned)	2015 (Note: The team was founded in 2015 and made its PSL debut in the 2016 season.)	Shadab Khan	Luke Ronchi
Karachi Kings	Karachi	Salman Iqbal	National Stadium, Karachi	2015	David Warner	Ravi Bopara
Lahore Qalandars	Lahore	Fawad Rana	Gaddafi Stadium, Lahore	2015	Shaheen Afridi	Russell Domingo
Multan Sultans	Multan	CD Venture	Multan Cricket Stadium	2018	Ashton Turner	Tim Paine
Peshawar Zalmi	Peshawar	Javed Afridi	Imran Khan Cricket Stadium, Peshawar	2015	Babar Azam	Ottis Gibson
Quetta Gladiators	Quetta	Nadeem Omar	Bugti Stadium, Quetta	2015	Saud Shakeel	Moin Khan
Rawalpindiz	Rawalpindi	Walee Technologies	Rawalpindi Cricket Stadium, Rawalpindi	2026	Mohammad Rizwan	Justin Kemp

=== Franchise fees ===
Distribution of Annual Franchise Fees (PKR crore)
1. Rawalpindiz 245 (27.8%)
2. Multan Sultans 200 (22.7%)
3. Hyderabad Kingsmen 175 (19.8%)
4. Lahore Qalandars 67 (7.60%)
5. Karachi Kings 64 (7.26%)
6. Peshawar Zalmi 49 (5.56%)
7. Islamabad United 48 (5.44%)
8. Quetta Gladiators 34 (3.85%)

The following table outlines the annual franchise fees as of the 2026 expansion. The total annual revenue generated for the Pakistan Cricket Board (PCB) from these fees is approximately Rs. 882 crore.

PSL Annual Franchise Fees
Franchise	Fee (PKR crore)	% of Total
Rawalpindiz	245	27.8%
Multan Sultans	200	22.7%
Hyderabad Kingsmen	175	19.8%
Lahore Qalandars	67	7.60%
Karachi Kings	64	7.26%
Peshawar Zalmi	49	5.56%
Islamabad United	48	5.44%
Quetta Gladiators	34	3.85%
Total	882	100%

Note: The table reflects final valuations only for each franchise.

== Results ==
The first season of the PSL was played entirely in the United Arab Emirates due to security reasons. The inaugural champions were Islamabad United, who defeated Quetta Gladiators in the final. Peshawar Zalmi were the 2017 PSL champions, beating Quetta Gladiators in Lahore on 5 March 2017. Islamabad United were the 2018 PSL champions, beating defending champions Peshawar Zalmi on 25 March 2018. Quetta Gladiators defeated Peshawar Zalmi to win their first title on 17 March 2019 in Karachi, in 2020 Karachi Kings took the trophy home. Multan Sultans, who won their first title defeating Peshawar Zalmi on 24 June 2021 in Abu Dhabi. Lahore Qalandars won their first title on 27 February 2022, against reigning champions Multan Sultan. Lahore Qalandars again defeated Multan Sultans with a minor margin of 1 run to win their consecutive 2nd title of the tournament in its 8th edition on 18 March 2023. Islamabad United became first team to win three title on 18 March 2024 when they defeated Multan Sultans by 2 wickets. It was Multan's fourth consecutive final and third consecutive runner up finish. Lahore Qalandars also won their third title by defeating Quetta Gladiators by 6 wickets on 25 May 2025. Shaheen Afridi is most successful captain of the League.

=== Final results ===
Season	No. of teams	Final			Venue	Player of the Tournament
Season	No. of teams	Winner	Winning margin	Runner-up	Venue	Player of the Tournament
2016 Details	5	Islamabad United; 175/4 (18.4 overs)	6 wickets Scorecard	Quetta Gladiators; 174/7 (20 overs)	Dubai International Cricket Stadium, Dubai	Ravi Bopara (Karachi Kings)
2017 Details	5	Peshawar Zalmi; 148/6 (20 overs)	58 runs Scorecard	Quetta Gladiators; 90 (16.3 overs)	Gaddafi Stadium, Lahore	Kamran Akmal (Peshawar Zalmi)
2018 Details	6	Islamabad United; 154/7 (16.5 overs)	3 wickets Scorecard	Peshawar Zalmi; 148/9 (20 overs)	National Stadium, Karachi	Luke Ronchi (Islamabad United)
2019 Details	6	Quetta Gladiators; 139/2 (17.5 overs)	8 wickets Scorecard	Peshawar Zalmi; 138/8 (20 overs)	National Stadium, Karachi	Shane Watson (Quetta Gladiators)
2020 Details	6	Karachi Kings; 135/5 (18.4 overs)	5 wickets Scorecard	Lahore Qalandars; 134/7 (20 overs)	National Stadium, Karachi	Babar Azam (Karachi Kings)
2021 Details	6	Multan Sultans; 206/4 (20 overs)	47 runs Scorecard	Peshawar Zalmi; 159/9 (20 overs)	Sheikh Zayed Cricket Stadium, Abu Dhabi	Sohaib Maqsood (Multan Sultans)
2022 Details	6	Lahore Qalandars; 180/5 (20 overs)	42 runs Scorecard	Multan Sultans; 138 (19.3 overs)	Gaddafi Stadium, Lahore	Mohammad Rizwan (Multan Sultans)
2023 Details	6	Lahore Qalandars; 200/6 (20 overs)	1 run Scorecard	Multan Sultans; 199/8 (20 overs)	Gaddafi Stadium, Lahore	Ihsanullah (Multan Sultans)
2024 Details	6	Islamabad United; 163/8 (20 overs)	2 wickets Scorecard	Multan Sultans; 159/9 (20 overs)	National Stadium, Karachi	Shadab Khan (Islamabad United)
2025 Details	6	Lahore Qalandars; 204/4 (19.5 overs)	6 wickets Scorecard	Quetta Gladiators; 201/9 (20 overs)	Gaddafi Stadium, Lahore	Hassan Nawaz (Quetta Gladiators)
2026 Details	8	Peshawar Zalmi; 130/5 (15.2 overs)	5 wickets Scorecard	Hyderabad Kingsmen; 129/10 (18 overs)	Gaddafi Stadium, Lahore	Sufiyan Muqeem (Peshawar Zalmi)

=== Champions ===
Teams are ranked by the number of titles won, in case of a tie, the team with more runner-up appearances is ranked higher and then by alphabetical order.

Team	Title(s)	Runner-up	Seasons won	Seasons runner-up
Lahore Qalandars	3	1	2022, 2023, 2025	2020
Islamabad United	3	–	2016, 2018, 2024	–
Peshawar Zalmi	2	3	2017, 2026	2018, 2019, 2021
Multan Sultans	1	3	2021	2022, 2023, 2024
Quetta Gladiators	1	3	2019	2016, 2017, 2025
Karachi Kings	1	–	2020	–

=== Team results ===
Season (No. of teams)	2016 (5)	2017 (5)	2018 (6)	2019 (6)	2020 (6)	2021 (6)	2022 (6)	2023 (6)	2024 (6)	2025 (6)	2026 (8)
Hosts(s) Teams	UAE	UAE Pakistan	UAE Pakistan	UAE Pakistan	Pakistan	Pakistan UAE	Pakistan	Pakistan	Pakistan	Pakistan	Pakistan
Hyderabad Kingsmen	Team did not exist										RU
Islamabad United	**W**	PO	**W**	PO	Grp	PO	PO	PO	**W**	PO	PO
Karachi Kings	PO	PO	PO	PO	**W**	PO	Grp	Grp	Grp	PO	Grp
Lahore Qalandars	Grp	Grp	Grp	Grp	RU	Grp	**W**	**W**	Grp	**W**	Grp
Multan Sultans	Team did not exist		Grp	Grp	PO	**W**	RU	RU	RU	Grp	PO
Peshawar Zalmi	PO	**W**	RU	RU	PO	RU	PO	PO	PO	Grp	**W**
Quetta Gladiators	RU	RU	PO	**W**	Grp	Grp	Grp	Grp	Grp	RU	Grp
Rawalpindiz	Team did not exist										Grp

Key

- W: Winner;
- RU: Runner-up;
- PO: Eliminated in the play-off stage
- Grp: Eliminated in the group stage

=== Team results summary ===
As of 22 February 2026

Team	Span	Best result	App	Pld	Won	Lost	Tie+W	Tie+L	NR	Win%
Islamabad United	2016–present	**Champions** (2016, 2018, 2024)	11	123	67	55	1	0	0	55.28
Lahore Qalandars	2016–present	**Champions** (2022, 2023, 2025)	11	117	53	60	1	2	1	46.55
Peshawar Zalmi	2016–present	**Champions** (2017, 2026)	11	125	69	54	1	0	1	56.45
Quetta Gladiators	2016–present	**Champions** (2019)	11	114	55	57	0	0	2	49.10
Karachi Kings	2016–present	**Champions** (2020)	11	116	47	65	1	1	2	42.10
Multan Sultans	2018–present	**Champions** (2021)	9	100	52	45	0	1	2	53.06
Hyderabad Kingsmen	2026–present	**Runners-up** (2026)	1	13	7	6	0	0	0	53.84
Rawalpindiz	2026–present	**League stage**	1	10	1	9	0	0	0	10.00

=== Individual awards ===
The Pakistan Super League honors outstanding individual excellence through three dedicated awards named after iconic figures of Pakistan cricket. The Hanif Mohammad Award (Green Cap) is presented to the tournament's leading run-scorer, while the Fazal Mahmood Award (Maroon Cap) recognizes the leading wicket-taker. The best wicket-keeper is honored with the Imtiaz Ahmed Award. Although these named trophies were formally introduced in the 2017 season, the league officially recognizes the statistical leaders from the 2016 inaugural edition as the original recipients of these honors.

Season	Hanif Mohammad Award (Most Runs)	Fazal Mahmood Award (Most Wickets)	Imtiaz Ahmed Award (Best Wicket-keeper)	Player of the Series
2016	Umar Akmal (335)	Andre Russell (16)	Sarfaraz Ahmed (10)	Ravi Bopara
2017	Kamran Akmal (353)	Sohail Khan (16)	Kamran Akmal (12)	Kamran Akmal
2018	Luke Ronchi (435)	Faheem Ashraf (18)	Kumar Sangakkara (10)	Luke Ronchi
2019	Shane Watson (430)	Hasan Ali (25)	Luke Ronchi (11)	Shane Watson
2020	Babar Azam (473)	Shaheen Afridi (17)	Ben Dunk (9)	Babar Azam
2021	Babar Azam (554)	Shahnawaz Dahani (20)	Mohammad Rizwan (20)	Sohaib Maqsood
2022	Fakhar Zaman (588)	Shaheen Afridi (20)	Mohammad Rizwan (9)	Mohammad Rizwan
2023	Mohammad Rizwan (550)	Abbas Afridi (23)	Mohammad Rizwan (14)	Ihsanullah
2024	Babar Azam (569)	Usama Mir (24)	Azam Khan (10)	Shadab Khan
2025	Sahibzada Farhan (449)	Shaheen Afridi (19)	Mohammad Haris (12)	Hassan Nawaz
2026	Babar Azam (588)	Sufiyan Muqeem (22)	Kusal Mendis (8)	Sufiyan Muqeem

=== Most individual appearances ===
As of 3 May 2026

Rank	Player	Team(s)	Years active	Appearances	Runs	Wkts
1	Imad Wasim	IU, KK,	2016–present	112	1,334	89
2	Babar Azam	PZ, KK, IU	2016–present	111	4,380	–
3	Fakhar Zaman	LQ	2017–present	105	3,365	2
4	Rilee Rossouw	QG, MS	2017–present	104	2,604	–
5	Shadab Khan	IU	2017–present	104	1,586	122
6	Mohammad Rizwan	MS, KK, LQ	2016–present	103	2,974	–
7	Hasan Ali	KK, IU, PZ	2016–present	101	340	140
8	Mohammad Nawaz	QG, KK	2016–present	98	958	80
9	Asif Ali	LQ, IU, PZ	2018–present	96	1,289	2
10	Faheem Ashraf	IU, QG	2018–present	95	1,039	104

- Source: ESPNcricinfo
- Currently active PSL players appear in **boldface**.

== Sponsorship ==
The PSL's initial title sponsorship was awarded to HBL Pakistan for three years in December 2015. At that time sponsorship deals for the league, including the title sponsorship, were estimated to be worth more than US$6 million. HBL renewed its title sponsorship in 2018 and again in 2021, extending its arrangement through the 2025 season.

In October 2025, HBL extended its title sponsorship for two further PSL seasons (2026–2027). The value of the title sponsorship agreement increased 505% compared to the original 2016 deal.

Title sponsor	Period	Sponsorship cost (per year)	Ref.
HBL Pakistan	2016–2018	PKR 54.4 crore (US$5.2 million)	
HBL Pakistan	2019–2021	PKR 214.8 crore (US$14.3 million)	
HBL Pakistan	2022–2025	PKR 340 crore (US$22.2 million)	
HBL Pakistan	2026–2027	505% of the 2016 deal (Figures not publicly disclosed.)	

== Broadcasters ==
=== Historic partners ===
The league signed a broadcast production deal with UK–based company Sunset and Vine for the first three seasons of the competition. Domestically TV broadcast rights were sold to PTV Sports and Ten Sports for the same period, with digital broadcast rights sold to YouTube in Pakistan for the first season. The digital rights were subsequently sold to cricketgateway.

For the period from 2019 to 2021, broadcast rights were sold to Blitz Advertising. Domestic TV rights for the same period were acquired by PTV Sports and Geo Network with cricketgateway retaining the digital rights.

From 2021 to 2025 broadcast rights were sold to TransGroup International with PTV Sports, A Sports and Ten Sports having the domestic broadcast rights until 2023. A Sports and Walee Technologies acquired these rights for the 2024–2025 seasons along with the digital streaming rights which had been sold to Daraz for the 2022 and 2023 seasons.

=== Current partners ===
Global media rights (minus India) for 2026 season were bought by Walee Technologies. It was a record-breaking deal at 149% increase compared to the previous cycle. Walee Technologies also bought local broadcasting rights for PKR 26.11 billion for the 2026 – 2029 period.

=== List of global broadcasters ===
Territory	Years	Channels and streaming services
Pakistan	2024	A Sports HD; Ten Sports HD Myco (OTT); SnackVideo (APP); Tamasha (OTT); Tapmad (OTT)
Sub-Saharan Africa	2024	SuperSport
Australia	2024	Fox Cricket
Bangladesh	2024	T Sports Tapmad (OTT)
Caribbean	2024	Flow Sports
Central America:-	2024	LiveSportsCentral (Facebook); Sports Central (YouTube)
Central Asia:-	2024	LiveSportsCentral (Facebook); Sports Central (YouTube)
East Asia	2024	LiveSportsCentral (Facebook); Sports Central (YouTube)
Europe	2024	LiveSportsCentral (Facebook); Sports Central (YouTube)
India	2024	Fancode (OTT)
Mexico	2024	LiveSportsCentral (Facebook); Sports Central (YouTube)
Middle East	2024	STARZPLAY e-vision Cricbuzz (OTT)
Nepal	2024	Action Sports HD Tapmad (OTT)
New Zealand	2024	Sky Sports NZ
North Africa	2024	STARZPLAY e-vision Cricbuzz (OTT)
North America	2024	Willow
Russia	2024	LiveSportsCentral (Facebook); Sports Central (YouTube)
Oceania	2024	LiveSportsCentral (Facebook); Sports Central (YouTube)
South America	2024	LiveSportsCentral (Facebook); Sports Central (YouTube)
South Asia	2024	LiveSportsCentral (Facebook); Sports Central (YouTube)
Southeast Asia	2024	Cricbuzz (OTT)
Sri Lanka	2024	The Papare TV Dialog ViU (App)
United Kingdom	2024	Geo News UK Sky Sports UK
Worldwide rights	2024–2025	TransGroup International

== Other media ==
=== Hamaray Heroes ===
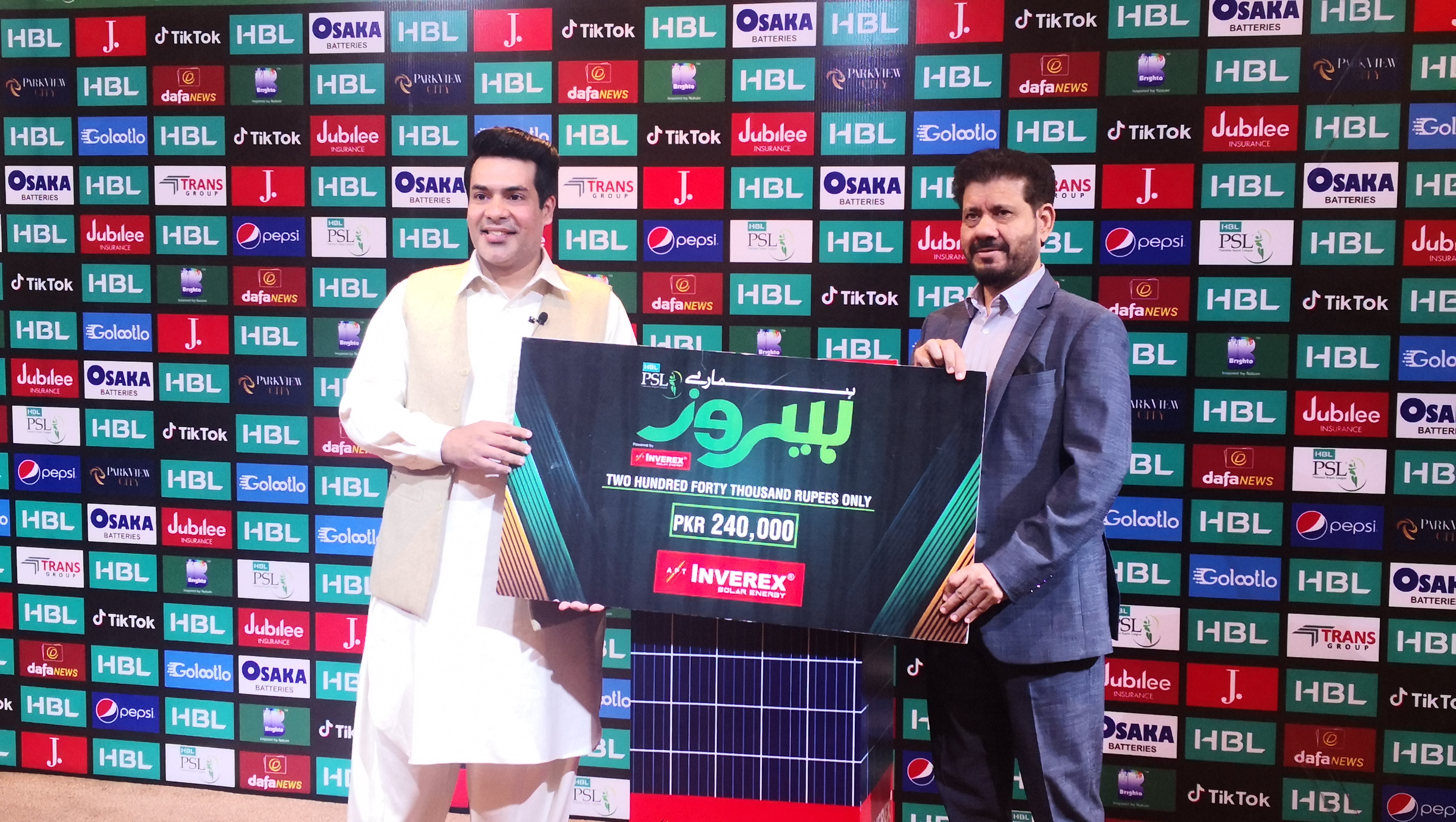
HBL PSL Hamaray Heroes Award

The HBL PSL Hamaray Heroes campaign was introduced in 2020 season. The initiative rewarded prominent Pakistanis like squash player Farhan Mehboob, founder of ACF Animal Rescue Ayesha Chundrigar, mountaineer Ali Sadpara, and professional eSports player Arslan Ash. A total of 32 HBL PSL Hamaray Heroes Awards were handed out during the 2020 season.

=== Cancer awareness ===
Since 2019, the league has reserved a day for breast cancer awareness, with a pink ribbon theme. A day has also been set aside to raise awareness of childhood cancer with a gold ribbon.

== See also ==
- List of Pakistan Super League records and statistics
- List of Pakistan Super League centuries
- List of Pakistan Super League anthems
- Pakistan Junior League
- List of Twenty20 cricket competitions
