= Ahsan Hafeez =

Pakistani cricketer (born 1998)

Personal information
- Full name: Ahsan Hafeez Bhatti
- Born: 30 March 1998 (age 28); Sheikhupura, Punjab, Pakistan
- Batting: Left-handed
- Bowling: Slow left-arm orthodox
- Role: All-rounder

Domestic team information
- Years: Team
- 2023-: Lahore Qalandars (squad no. 33)
- 2025: Sylhet Strikers (squad no. 33)
- Source: ESPNcricinfo, 17 December 2016

Ahsan Hafeez Bhatti (born 30 March 1998) is a Pakistani cricketer. He made his List A debut for National Bank of Pakistan in the 2016–17 Departmental One Day Cup on 17 December 2016. He made his first-class debut for Federally Administered Tribal Areas in the 2017–18 Quaid-e-Azam Trophy on 15 October 2017. He plays Pakistan Super League 2023-24 for lahore qalandars. He also plays for Sylhet Strickers as overseas player in Bangladesh Premier League 2025.
