= Usman Khan (cricketer) =

Pakistani cricketer (born 1995)

- Khan in 2024

Personal information
- Born: 10 May 1995 (age 31); Karachi, Sindh, Pakistan
- Batting: Right-handed
- Bowling: Right-arm off-break
- Role: Top-order batter

International information
- National side: Pakistan (2024–present)
- ODI debut (cap 253): 29 March 2025 v New Zealand
- Last ODI: 5 April 2025 v New Zealand
- T20I debut (cap 116): 18 April 2024 v New Zealand
- Last T20I: 28 February 2026 v Sri Lanka
- T20I shirt no.: 78

Domestic team information
- Years: Team
- 2021: Quetta Gladiators
- 2023–2025: Multan Sultans (squad no. 13)
- 2023: Chattogram Challengers
- 2023: Agrani Bank Cricket Club
- 2024-25: Chittagong Kings

Career statistics
Competition	ODI	T20I	FC	LA
Matches	2	38	6	20
Runs scored	51	474	422	1,025
Batting average	25.50	18.96	42.20	64.05
100s/50s	0/0	0/2	0/3	3/5
Top score	39	53	93	201*
Catches/stumpings	0/0	18/5	4/0	14/1
Medal record
Men's cricket
Representing Pakistan
Asian Games
Silver medal – second place	2026 Aichi–Nagoya	Team
- Source: Cricinfo, 8 March 2026

Usman Khan (Note: Urdu: عثمان خان) (born 10 May 1995) is a Pakistani international cricketer who plays for the Pakistan national team. He is a right-handed batsman and also plays as a wicket-keeper.

He made his T20 International debut for Pakistan on 18 April 2024 and his One Day International (ODI) debut on 29 March 2025 against New Zealand. He has played domestic cricket for Karachi Whites and in the Pakistan Super League for Quetta Gladiators and the Multan Sultans.

== Early life ==
Khan is from Farooqabad, a town in the Sheikhupura District, and initially played cricket in the Sialkot region.

In 2012, Khan moved to Karachi to seek better cricketing opportunities and joined the Pakistan Cricket Club, where he played under the captaincy of Sarfaraz Ahmed. He found success as an opening batsman and wicket-keeper, performing well in Ramzan cricket tournaments. He also participated in a tournament at the Moin Khan academy, where he was awarded the Player of the Tournament Award. His performances led to his selection in the Pakistan Super League (PSL) by Nadeem Omar.

== Domestic career ==
=== Pakistan ===
Khan made his first-class debut for Karachi Whites in the 2017–18 Quaid-e-Azam Trophy on 9 October 2017. He made his Twenty20 debut on 3 March 2021, for Quetta Gladiators in the 2021 Pakistan Super League.

In November 2022, Usman was signed by the Chattogram Challengers to play for them in the 2022–23 Bangladesh Premier League. On 9 January 2023, he hit his maiden century in T20 cricket, scoring 103 runs off just 58 balls against the Khulna Tigers, guiding his team to the first win of the tournament by 9 wickets.

On 11 March 2023, he recorded a century off just 36 deliveries in the Pakistan Super League which is the fastest by a batter in the league's history. In PSL 9, he scored two more centuries. He scored 430 runs in just 7 matches for Multan Sultans with an average of 107.5. Usman Khan joined a Pakistan Team training Camp at Kakul, Abbottabad in April 2024. He made his debut for Pakistan on 18 April 2024 against New Zealand, in their 2024 T20 tour of Pakistan.

=== United Arab Emirates ===
In 2020, Khan relocated to Ajman in the United Arab Emirates where he worked in the purchasing department of a gas distribution company. In 2022, he took on employment as a security guard and storekeeper while continuing to play domestic cricket in the UAE alongside his work commitments.

In 2023, Khan announced his intention to qualify for the United Arab Emirates national cricket team, stating "my dream is to play for UAE". He began the process of meeting ICC residency qualifications for the UAE, but subsequently abandoned his attempt to qualify for the UAE after being selected for Pakistan. In April 2024, the Emirates Cricket Board (ECB) banned Khan from domestic cricket in the UAE for five years, stating he had "misrepresented to ECB about his decision to play for the UAE team" and had "used the opportunities and development provided by the ECB to him to seek out other prospects and it was evident he was no longer wanting to play for ECB nor complete the eligibility criteria which he was under an obligation to do".

== International career ==
Khan made his T20 International debut for Pakistan against the New Zealand in April 2024. The following month, he was included in Pakistan's squad for the 2024 ICC Men's T20 World Cup held in the West Indies and the United States.

In March 2025, Khan made his ODI debut, also against New Zealand, during the home series in Pakistan. He was named in Pakistan's white-ball squads for the home series against South Africa and the tri-nation series with Sri Lanka and Zimbabwe in October 2025.

In June 2026, he was named in the 15-member men's squad announced for the 2026 Asian Games. On 3 October 2026, Pakistan won the silver medal after losing in the Asian Games men’s cricket final against India at the Kōrogi Athletic Park in Nisshin, Japan.
