= Anwar Ali (cricketer) =

Pakistani cricketer

Personal information
- Born: 25 November 1987 (age 38); Khwazakhela, Khyber Pakhtunkhwa, Pakistan
- Height: 6 ft 2 in (188 cm)
- Batting: Right-handed
- Bowling: Right-arm fast-medium
- Role: All-Rounder

International information
- National side: Pakistan
- ODI debut (cap 194): 24 November 2013 v South Africa
- Last ODI: 25 January 2016 v New Zealand
- ODI shirt no.: 48
- T20I debut (cap 28): 12 October 2008 v Zimbabwe
- Last T20I: 2 March 2016 v Bangladesh

Domestic team information
- Years: Team
- 2007: Karachi Harbour
- 2008–2018: Pakistan International Airlines
- 2013: Rangpur Riders
- 2016–2021: Quetta Gladiators
- 2019–present: Sindh
- 2020: Dambulla Viiking
- 2021–: Muzaffarabad Tigers
- 2022: Multan Sultans
- 2023: Gloucestershire

Career statistics
Competition	ODI	T20I	FC	LA
Matches	22	16	108	164
Runs scored	321	109	2,670	2,606
Batting average	29.18	15.57	21.36	30.30
100s/50s	0/0	0/0	1/11	0/16
Top score	43*	46	100*	89
Balls bowled	927	265	18,032	7,196
Wickets	18	10	349	190
Bowling average	52.44	36.70	27.59	33.77
5 wickets in innings	0	0	20	1
10 wickets in match	0	0	4	0
Best bowling	3/66	2/27	8/16	5/49
Catches/stumpings	4/–	5/–	39/–	48/–
- Source: , 25 January 2024

Anwar Ali (Urdu: انور علی; born 25 November 1987) is a Pakistani cricketer who has represented his country in One Day Internationals and T20 Internationals. He was also part of the 2006 Under-19 Cricket World Cup winning Pakistan team, putting in a man-of-the-match performance (5 wickets for 35 runs) in the final against India. He represents Karachi Zebras and Sindh Dolphins in the domestic arena. He played for Multan Sultans in the PSL 8.

== Early and domestic career ==
He was born in Khwazakhela to a Muslim Gujjar family and he migrated to Karachi as a child. He spent his early years as a factory labourer, ironing socks. He is playing as a professional for Colne Cricket Club in Lancashire, England, in the Lancashire League. He joined North Down Cricket Club in Northern Ireland for the 2012 season as the club professional.

In April 2018, he was named in Balochistan's squad for the 2018 Pakistan Cup. In March 2019, he was named in Punjab's squad for the 2019 Pakistan Cup.

In July 2019, he was selected to play for the Rotterdam Rhinos in the inaugural edition of the Euro T20 Slam cricket tournament. However, the following month the tournament was cancelled.

In September 2019, he was named in Sindh's squad for the 2019–20 Quaid-e-Azam Trophy tournament. In November 2021, he was selected to play for the Galle Gladiators following the players' draft for the 2021 Lanka Premier League.

== Under-19 World Cup ==
Anwar Ali led a great comeback win for Pakistan against India in the 2006 Under-19 Cricket World Cup. He took five wickets, including shattering Rohit Sharma's stumps with an inswinger. He also took the wicket of Ravindra Jadeja. Both of these players have played for the senior national team in the One Day Internationals. His five wickets for 35 runs, and 17 runs with the bat in a low-scoring match, won him the Man of the Match award.

== International career ==
Anwar Ali made his T20 debut for Pakistan on 12 October 2008, against Zimbabwe. He bowled 2 overs and went for 19 runs without taking a wicket. Anwar made his comeback against Zimbabwe as well, where he took 2 wickets in both matches. Pakistan won the series 2–0. After good form against Zimbabwe and in domestic matches, he got an ODI cap and scored 43 not out; he also took 2–26 in 6 overs. Together he and Bilawal Bhatti defeated South Africa. He also made a fine 41 not out in an ODI against Sri Lanka and took a wicket in the match. Only in his first One Day International, Anwar Ali promised to be a good player as he was able to win the Man Of The Match award.

During the second match of the T20I series against Sri Lanka on 2015 August in Colombo, Ali smashed a match-winning knock of unbeaten 46 runs, where Pakistan won a game when they were nowhere near a winning margin. Sri Lanka batted first and scored 172 runs in 20 overs. The score showed a win for the Sri Lankans, due to difficulty to bat in the second innings in their home soil of Colombo. Pakistan came on to bat and with first five wickets gone for just 40 runs on the board. For the sixth wicket, skipper Shahid Afridi smashed a quick 45 runs off 22 balls and the match turned again to the Pakistanis. After Afridi's wicket, the Lankans were back in the game, when Ali came in to the crease. He showed immense talent and was hard-hitting against the Sri Lankan pace attack and scored a blistering 46 runs off 17 balls with 3 fours and 4 huge sixes. Ali got out in the score of 165 runs and finally Pakistan won comfortably with 1 wicket. This is Pakistan's first T20I win in a narrow margin of wickets. Ali was named the man of the match award and Pakistan won the series 2–0.
