= Abbas Afridi (cricketer) =

Pakistani cricketer

Personal information
- Full name: Muhammad Abbas Afridi
- Born: 5 April 2001 (age 25); Peshawar, Khyber Pakhtunkhwa, Pakistan
- Height: 6 ft 1 in (185 cm)
- Batting: Right-handed
- Bowling: Right-arm medium-fast
- Role: Bowler
- Relatives: Umar Gul (uncle)

International information
- National side: Pakistan (2024–present)
- T20I debut (cap 111): 12 January 2024 v New Zealand
- Last T20I: 22 July 2025 v Bangladesh
- T20I shirt no.: 55

Domestic team information
- Years: Team
- 2021: Karachi Kings
- 2022–2024: Multan Sultans
- 2023: Montreal Tigers
- 2023–present: Peshawar cricket team
- 2024: Fortune Barishal
- 2025: Karachi Kings

Career statistics
Competition	T20I	FC	LA	T20
Matches	23	9	28	84
Runs scored	134	101	244	358
Batting average	12.18	10.10	17.42	11.93
100s/50s	0/0	0/0	1/0	0/0
Top score	22	21	112	34
Balls bowled	417	1,076	1,089	1639
Wickets	38	23	44	121
Bowling average	15.52	29.43	23.34	20.00
5 wickets in innings	0	0	2	1
10 wickets in match	0	0	0	0
Best bowling	3/17	4/84	5/38	5/47
Catches/stumpings	4/–	2/–	6/–	19/–
- Source: Cricinfo, 22 July 2025

Muhammad Abbas Afridi (born 5 April 2001) is a Pakistani cricketer who plays for Karachi Kings and Pakistan national cricket team. He made his international debut for Pakistan National Cricket team on 12 January 2024 against New Zealand.

== Early life and family ==
Abbas Afridi was born on 5 April 2001 in Peshawar into a Pashtun family belonging to the Afridi tribe.

He is the nephew of former Pakistan international cricketer Umar Gul.

== Domestic career ==
In September 2018, Afridi made his List A debut for Habib Bank Limited in the 2018–19 Quaid-e-Azam One Day Cup.

In October 2018, he made his first-class debut for Habib Bank Limited in the 2018–19 Quaid-e-Azam Trophy.

In December 2019, he was named in Pakistan's squad for the 2020 Under-19 Cricket World Cup. He remained leading wicket-taker for Pakistan in the tournament.

In October 2021, he was named in the Pakistan Shaheens squad for their tour of Sri Lanka.

== Franchise career ==
=== Pakistan Super League ===
In February 2021, Afridi joined Karachi Kings for the 2021 PSL. The next month, he made his Twenty20 debut for the team.

Afridi was the top wicket taker in the 2023 PSL by taking 23 wickets one more than teammate Ihsanullah, representing Multan Sultans.

=== Other leagues ===
Afridi was selected by the Montreal Tigers in the 2023 Global T20 Canada and was praised for his hat-trick against the Vancouver Knights.

Afridi was made Player of the Series in the 2025 Hong Kong Sixes, and was Player of the Match in the final against Kuwait for his 52* (11), having also taken a wicket. Previously, he had hit a quickfire 55* (12), including six sixes in a row, as well a wicket, also against Kuwait. During the whole tournament he had been promoted up the order, having batted at No. 3.

== International career ==
On 12 January 2024, Abbas Afridi made his T20 International debut against New Zealand and took 3 wickets for 34 runs. In May 2024, he was named in Pakistan's squad for the 2024 ICC Men's T20 World Cup tournament.
