= Ihsanullah (Pakistani cricketer) =

Pakistani cricketer

Personal information
- Full name: Ihsanullah
- Born: 11 October 2002 (age 24); Swat District, Khyber Pakhtunkhwa, Pakistan
- Nickname: Matta Express
- Height: 6 ft 5 in (196 cm)
- Batting: Right-handed
- Bowling: Right-arm fast
- Role: Bowler

International information
- National side: Pakistan (2023)
- Only ODI (cap 241): 29 April 2023 v New Zealand
- T20I debut (cap 100): 24 March 2023 v Afghanistan
- Last T20I: 27 March 2023 v Afghanistan
- T20I shirt no.: 52

Domestic team information
- Years: Team
- 2022–2024: Multan Sultans (squad no. 50)
- 2023: Khyber Pakhtunkhwa
- 2025: Peshawar Zalmi (squad no. 50)
- 2025: Noakhali Express (squad no. 150)
- 2026: Karachi Kings (squad no. 50)

Career statistics
| Competition | ODI | T20I | List A | T20 |
|---|---|---|---|---|
| Matches | 1 | 4 | 12 | 31 |
| Runs scored | – | 6* | 19 | 14 |
| Batting average | – | – | 3.80 | 4.66 |
| 100s/50s | 0/0 | 0/0 | 0/0 | 0/0 |
| Top score | – | 6* | 10 | 6* |
| Balls bowled | 48 | 89 | 503 | 643 |
| Wickets | 0 | 6 | 25 | 42 |
| Bowling average | – | 18.00 | 22.36 | 20.04 |
| 5 wickets in innings | 0 | 0 | 1 | 1 |
| 10 wickets in match | 0 | 0 | 0 | 0 |
| Best bowling | – | 3/29 | 5/49 | 5/12 |
| Catches/stumpings | 0/– | 0/– | 1/– | 1/– |
- Source: Cricinfo, 21 October 2025

Ihsanullah (born 11 October 2002) is a Pakistani cricketer who plays for Karachi Kings. Nicknamed the "Matta Express", he was considered as one of the fastest bowlers in Pakistan national cricket team before his injury in 2023.

== Early career ==
Ihsanullah was born in the Arkot village, situated in the Swat Valley's Matta Tehsil, losing his home during the 2022 floods, while he began his professional cricket career in 2017, playing for FATA Under-16, in 2018 taking part in PCB's U-16 Pentangular T20 Tournament.

== Domestic and franchise career ==
In January 2022, Ihsanullah made his Twenty20 debut, after being named as one of the local players for Multan Sultans in the draft for the 2022 PSL.

In September 2022, he made his first-class debut for Khyber Paktunkhwa, becoming the team's highest wicket-taker for the Quaid-e-Azam Trophy in the 2022–23 season while also being the second highest wicket-taker in the Pakistan ODI Cup for 2022–23.

In February 2023, he was noticed for delivering the second-best spell of the Pakistan Super League with a figures of 5–12 against Quetta Gladiators, while playing for Multan Sultans for the 2023 PSL. His spell is also considered the fastest in PSL's history, with an average speed of 144.37 kph and a delivery going over 154.5 kph, surpassing Haris Rauf's spell against Peshawar Zalmi during the 2022 PSL, when his average speed was 144.16 kph.

In March 2023, at the end of the 2023 PSL, he won both the HBL PSL 8 Player of the Tournament award as well the Bowler of HBL PSL 8 award, for his 22 wickets at an economy-rate of 7.59.

== International career ==
In December 2022, alongside batsmen Saim Ayub and Haseebullah Khan, Ihsanullah was one of the three youngsters selected to be included in the national squad for the second Test match of the New Zealand series in Karachi, so they could get some international exposure and see the dynamics of the dressing room.

In March 2023, he was named in Pakistan's Twenty20 International (T20I) squad for the series against Afghanistan. He made his T20I debut in the first T20I of the series, on 24 March 2023. In the match, he took a wicket with his first delivery.

In April 2023, he was named in Pakistan's One Day International (ODI) squad for the series against New Zealand. He made his ODI debut in the second ODI of the series, on 29 April 2023.
