= Usama Mir =

Pakistani cricketer

Usama Mir اسامه میر
Personal information
- Born: 23 December 1995 (age 30); Sialkot, Punjab, Pakistan
- Height: 191 cm (6 ft 3 in)
- Batting: Right-handed
- Bowling: Right-arm leg spin
- Role: Bowler

International information
- National side: Pakistan (2023–2024)
- ODI debut (cap 239): 9 January 2023 v New Zealand
- Last ODI: 31 October 2023 v Bangladesh
- ODI shirt no.: 24
- T20I debut (cap 112): 12 January 2024 v New Zealand
- Last T20I: 21 January 2024 v New Zealand
- T20I shirt no.: 24

Domestic team information
- Years: Team
- 2013–2014/15: Khan Research Laboratories
- 2015/16: Sialkot Stallions
- 2015/16–2018/19: Sui Southern Gas Company
- 2016–2020: Karachi Kings (squad no. 23)
- 2016, 2020/21: Baluchistan
- 2017: Sindh
- 2017/18: Rajshahi Kings
- 2019: St Kitts & Nevis Patriots
- 2019: Panadura Sports Club
- 2022/23: Central Punjab
- 2023–2025: Multan Sultans
- 2023, 2026: Worcestershire
- 2023–2024: Manchester Originals
- 2023/24: Melbourne Stars
- 2025: Antigua and Barbuda Falcons
- 2025: Hobart Hurricanes
- 2026: Lahore Qalandars

Career statistics
Competition	ODI	T20I	FC	T20
Matches	12	5	34	192
Runs scored	40	7	669	704
Batting average	6.70	2.33	15.92	9.14
100s/50s	0/0	0/0	0/2	0/1
Top score	20	5	77*	63
Balls bowled	636	120	3,979	3,964
Wickets	15	5	77	231
Bowling average	42.30	35.00	32.76	22.11
5 wickets in innings	0	0	5	2
10 wickets in match	0	0	0	0
Best bowling	4/43	2/21	6/91	6/8
Catches/stumpings	7/–	2/–	19/–	69/–
- Source: Cricinfo, 27 September 2026

Usama Mir (born 23 December 1995) is a Pakistani cricketer who plays for the national team in ODIs and T20Is. Usama Mir made his Pakistan debut in 2023.

== Early life ==
Usama Mir was born to an ethnic Kashmiri family in Sialkot.

== Domestic career ==
Mir has played for Khan Research Laboratories from 2013 to 2015 seasons and remained as wicket-taking option for his captain. He was the leading wicket taker during the 2015 edition of the Haier Super 8 T20 Cup. In 2017, Mir played for Karachi Kings in PSL. He was also the part of the Pakistan team which ended as runners up to Sri Lanka in the 2017 ACC Emerging Team Cup. During that tournament he finished as the leading wicket-taker with 13 dismissals. In April 2018, he was named in Punjab's squad for the 2018 Pakistan Cup. He took the most wickets for Punjab during the tournament, with six dismissals in four matches. On 3 June 2018, he was selected to play for the Toronto Nationals in the players' draft for the inaugural edition of the Global T20 Canada tournament. He was the lead wicket taker in the PSL 2024, taking 24 wickets in 12 matches for Multan Sultans.

== International career ==
Mir made his ODI debut against New Zealand in January 2023. He took his first wicket of Kane Williamson and went on to take two wickets in total in that match. In October 2023, he played his first World Cup match against Australia, taking 1 wicket for 82 runs. He went wicketless against Afghanistan in his second match of the 2023 Cricket World Cup. Usama Mir became the first concussion substitute in the World Cups by replacing Shadab Khan in the game against South Africa. He got 2 wickets for 45 runs off his 8 overs. He picked important scalps of Rassie van der Dussen and Aiden Markram.
