= List of Pakistan Super League anthems =

Pakistani domestic sports franchise anthems

Pakistan Super League is a professional Twenty20 cricket league, which is operated by Pakistan Cricket Board. Since the 2026 season, it is contested annually by eight franchises, comprising cricketers from Pakistan and around the world.

The musical anthems for the league have been released to promote the tournament in media, and anthems for every team to promote their tournament performances.

== Title anthems ==
=== Official anthems ===
Anthems by Pakistan Cricket Board
Season	Title	Release	Artists	Writer	Sponsor
2016	"Ab Khel Ke Dikha"	Audio: 20 September 2015; Video: 4 February 2016	Ali Zafar		HBL Pakistan
2017	"Ab Khel Jamay Ga"	Audio: 1 January 2017; Video: 30 January 2017	Ali Zafar		HBL Pakistan
2018	"Dil Se Jaan Laga De"	28 January 2018	Ali Zafar		HBL Pakistan
2019	"Khel Deewano Ka"	18 January 2019	Fawad Khan ft. Young Desi	Shuja Haider	
2020	"Tayyar Hain"	28 January 2020	Ali Azmat, Haroon, Asim Azhar, Arif Lohar	Xulfi	Pepsi
2021	"Groove Mera"	6 February 2021	Aima Baig, Naseebo Lal, Young Stunners	Lyrics by Adnan Dhool, Composed by Xulfi	
2022	"Agay Dekh"	24 January 2022	Atif Aslam, Aima Baig	Abdullah Siddiqui, Natasha Noorani	TikTok
2023	"Sab Sitaray Humaray"	11 February 2023	Asim Azhar, Shae Gill, Faris Shafi	Asim Azhar, Faris Shah, Hassan Ali	
2024	"Khul Ke Khel"	14 February 2024	Ali Zafar, Aima Baig	Ali Zafar	
2025	"X Dekho"	2 April 2025	Ali Zafar, Abrar Ul Haq, Talha Anjum, Natasha Baig		
2026	"Khelenge Beat Pe"	24 March 2026	Atif Aslam, Aima Baig, Sabri Sisters, Daniya Kanwal	Nimra Gilani, Daniya Kanwal	Pepsi

=== Secondary anthems ===
Season	Title	Singer	Release	Notes
2017	"De Maar Saare Char (Ballay Ballay)"	Shehzad Roy	30 January 2017	Under the label of title sponsor Habib Bank Limited
2018	"Lo Phir Say Miley"	Shehzad Roy	28 January 2018	Under the label of title sponsor Habib Bank Limited
2021	"Googly"	Maanu and Rozeo		From the album HBL PSL Taranay
2021	"Laibo"	Lyari Underground		From the album HBL PSL Taranay
2021	"Baazi Paltay Gi Yahaan"	Janoobi Khargosh		From the album HBL PSL Taranay
2021	"6ixer"	Talal Qureshi		From the album HBL PSL Taranay
2021	"Maidaan"	Khumariyaan		From the album HBL PSL Taranay
2023	"HBL PSL Mashup 2023"	(various)		Mashup by Talal Qureshi
2026	"Gyara Hone Wala"			

== Islamabad United ==
Islamabad United anthems
Season	Title	Release	Singer	Music	Lyrics
2016	"Chakka Choka"	30 January 2016	Ali Zafar		
2017	"Cricket Jorray Pakistan"	27 January 2017	Momina Mustehsan		
2017	"Jeet Ho Ya Haar"	2 February 2017	Zoha Zuberi		Ahmad Mehdi
2017	"Kitna Rola Daalay Ga"	18 February 2017	Abdullah Qureshi	Xulfi	Sami Khan and Xulfi
2020	"Rang Jeet Ka Laal Hai"	19 February 2020	Soch the Band	Adnan Dhool & Rabi Ahamed	Adnan Dhool & Asim Raza
2022	"Trophy Idhar Rakh"	29 January 2022	Adnan Dhool and Talha Anjum	Adnan Dhool, Rabi Ahmed (Soch the Band)	Adnan Dhool and Asfandyar Effendi
2023	"Next Level Shahzaday"	25 February 2023			

== Karachi Kings ==
Karachi Kings anthems
Season	Title	Release	Singer	Notes	Label
2016	"Dilon Ke Hum Hain Badshah"	8 January 2016	Ali Azmat	Composed by Shahbaz Ali (Shabi)	ARY Films
2017	"Dhan Dhana Dhan Hoga Re"	3 February 2017	Shehzad Roy	Composed by Naqash Haider	ARY Films
2018	"De Dhana Dhan"	7 February 2018	Shehzad Roy	Composed by Naqash Haider	ARY Films
2019	"De Dhana Dhan" (Remix)	13 February 2019	Shehzad Roy	Composed by Naqash Haider	ARY Films
2020	"Ye Hai Karachi"	20 February 2020	Asim Azhar	Lyrics by Sabir Zafar	ARY Films
2022	"Ye Hai Karachi" (version 2)	30 January 2022	Asim Azhar, Talhah Yunus	Sabir Zafar, Talhah Yunus, Asim Azhar	ARY Films
2023	"Ye Hai Karachi" (version 3)	13 February 2023	Asim Azhar & Ali Azmat ft. Raamis Ali	Written by Raamis Ali, Asim Azhar & Hassan Ali	ARY Films
2025	"Kings' Flow"	12 April 2025	Asim Azhar, Talhah Yunus		ARY Films
2026	"Hai Apni Karni"	27 March 2026	HAVI, Raamis, Zain Zohaib	Lyrics by HAVI & Raamis	ARY Films

== Lahore Qalandars ==
Lahore Qalandars anthems
Season	Title	Release	Singer
2016	"Dama Dam Mast"	3 January 2016	Asrar
2016	"Mast Qalandar"	3 January 2016	Nabeel Shaukat Ali
2017	"Qalandar Arahay Hain"	3 February 2017	Shafqat Amanat Ali Khan
2017	"Pappu Yaar"	12 February 2017	Junoon (from album Dewaar)
2018	"Lahore Qalandar Mast"	19 February 2018	Fawad Rana
2021	"Bol Qalandar"	19 February 2021	Abrar ul Haq
2023	"Qalandar Hum"	9 February 2023	J Ali
2025	"Hum Hein Lahore Qalandar"	12 April 2025	RagaBoyz ft. Zain Kazmi

== Multan Sultans ==
Multan Sultans anthems
Season	Title	Release	Singer(s)	Music	Lyrics
2018	"Cricket Kay Toofan"	22 September 2017			
2018	"Hum Hain Multan Kay Sultans"	21 February 2018	Waqar Ehsin	Sarang Latif, Waqar Ehsin	Zartash Rajput
2019	"Let's Play Saeen"	4 February 2019	Farrukh Malik ft. Janoob ki Awaam	SomeWhatSuper	
2019	"Waqt-E-Janoob"	13 February 2019	Attaullah Khan Esakhelvi		
2021	"Tak Meday Sohna"	26 February 2021	Adnan Dhool, Quratulain Balouch	Soch the band, Xulfi	Asim Raza
2024	"Sultanat (Sultans in the House)"	16 February 2023	Maanu, Natasha Noorani, Talal Qureshi		

== Peshawar Zalmi ==
Peshawar Zalmi anthems
Season	Title	Release	Artist(s)	Music	Lyrics	Notes
2016	"Peshawar Zalmi" (Urdu)	2 February 2016	Arbaz Khan and Zohaib Amjab	Arbaz Khan		Beyond Records
2016	"Peshawar Zalmi" (Pashto)	2 February 2016	Gul Panra, Hamayoon Khan, Zeek Afridi and Bakhtiar Khattak	Ivan Shafiq	Hamayoon Khan	Beyond Records
2016	"Meena"	2 February 2016	Gul Panra and Irfan Khan	Hamayoon Khan	Hamayoon Khan	Beyond Records
2016	"Moonga Zu"	2 February 2016	Hamayoon Khan	Waqar Shafi	Hamayoon Khan	Beyond Records
2016	"Taroon"	2 February 2016	Zeek Afridi	Waqar Shafi	Hamayoon Khan	Beyond Records
2016	"Zwangeer" (Instrumental)	2 February 2016	Khumariyaan (band)	Sarmad Ghafoor		Beyond Records
2016	"Shamlay"	2 February 2016	Bakhtiar Khattak	Ziyad Khan and Hamayoon Khan	Jafar Khan Jafar	Beyond Records
2017	"Main Zalmi Hoon"	15 February 2017	Rahat Fateh Ali Khan	Sahir Ali Bagga	Shahabuddin Shahab	Beyond Records
2017	"Zalmi Tarana"	15 February 2017	Zeek Afridi and Hadiqa Kiani	Mujtaba Ali Choni	Asim Raza and Laiq Zada Laiq	Beyond Records
2017	"Peshawar Zalmi" (Urdu)	15 February 2017	Arbaz Khan and Imran Aziz Mian	Arbaz Khan		Beyond Records
2017	"Peshawar Zalmi" (Pashto)	15 February 2017				Beyond Records
2017	"Aye Aye"	15 February 2017				Beyond Records
2018	"Zalmi Zalmi"	11 February 2018	Maz Bonafide	Kam Frantic	Omar Malik	
2018	"Yellow Storm"	11 February 2018	Maz Bonafide			
2018	"Hum Zalmi"	14 February 2018	Call ft. Leo Twins	Xulfi		Beyond Records
2019	"Zalmi Da Pekhawar"	13 February 2019	Zeek Afridi ft. Gul Panra	Ivon Shafiq	Laiq Zada Laiq	No Limit Communication
2020	"We are Peshawar Zalmi"	16 February 2020	Fortitude Pukhtoon Core	Webster Beats – Shumail Alam Khan	Fortitude Pukhtoon Core	Zalmi TV
2021	"Kingdom"	19 February 2021	Abdullah Siddiqui ft. Altamash Server			Zalmi TV
2021	"Shamla"	25 February 2021	Gul Panra	Khumariyaan	Laiq Zada Laiq	Zalmi TV
2022	"Aaya Zalmi"	28 January 2022	Zarsanga, Sunny Khan Durrani, Zoha Zuberi, Tayyab Rehman and Zara Madani	Ali Mustafa	Zoha Zuberi, Khan Durrani, Rehman Gul	Zalmi TV
2022	"Har Qadam Hai Zalmi"	3 February 2022	Farhan Saeed ft. Fortitude Pukhtoon Core			Zalmi TV
2023	"Zalmi Azmari"	12 February 2023	Jaam Boys (Junaid Kamran Siddique & Arsalan Shah)		Wajdan Khattak, Laiq Zada Laiq	
2023	"Zalmi Raalal"	17 February 2023	Zahoor, Bilaal Avaz, Altamash Sever Butt	Zahoor, Naughty Boy, Khumariyaan	Zahoor, Asfand Yar Wali Khan, Bilaal Avaz	
2024	"Zalmi Awaaz"	14 February 2024	Rahim Shah	Yammy Studio	Shahab Uddin Shahab	
2024	"Zalmi Yama"	16 February 2024	Nehaal Naseem, Zahoor, Abdullah Siddiqui	Abdullah Siddiqui, Zahoor, Asfandyar Asad		
2025	"Za Ba Sal Zala Zalmi Yam"	2 April 2025	Rahim Shah	Shani Arshad, Rahim Shah	Hashmat Hanguwal, Shahab Ud Din Shahab	
2025	"The Journey Home"	9 April 2025	Aima Baig, Bilaal Avaz, Wajid Layaq	Kashan Dawar	Wajid Layaq, Bilaal Avaz	
2025	"Dust of War"	9 April 2025	Mustafa Zahid, Altamash Sever, Mustafa Kamal Khan	Kashan Dawar	Zohaib Khan, Mustafa Kamal Khan	
2026	"Zamung Zalmi"	21 March 2026	Khumariyaan, Jaam Boys	Hamayun Ghazal		

== Quetta Gladiators ==
Quetta Gladiators anthems
Season	Title	Release	Singer(s)	Music	Lyrics
2016	"Kai Kai Quetta"	13 January 2016	Faakhir Mehmood and Faheem Allan Fakir	Faakhir	
2016	"Balla Ghumaye Jaa"	20 January 2016	Asrar and Akhtar Chanal Zahri		
2016	"Quetta Gladiators"	14 February 2016	Desi Brits		GM Shah
2017	"Kai Kai Quetta"	15 February 2017	Faakhir Mehmood ft. Sarfaraz Ahmed	Faakhir	
2018	"Aa Gae Shaan Se Hum"	5 March 2018	Faakhir Mehmood and Aima Baig	Faakhir	
2018	"Quetta Kai Kai"	20 March 2018	Badnaam		
2019	"Quetta Quetta"	3 February 2019	Young Stunners ft. Abid Brohi		
2019	"Kai Kai Kai Kai"	13 February 2019	Badnaam (band)		
2019	"We the Gladiators"	10 March 2019	DJ Bravo ft. team and management		
2021	"Aar Ya Paar"	19 February 2021	RAAMIS		
2022	"Shan-e-Pakistan"	22 January 2022	Bilal Maqsood and Ahmed Murtaza		
2023	"We're the Champions"	20 February 2023	DJ Bravo		
2025	"Jashan Tou Hoga"	13 April 2025	Faakhir, Sameen Khawaja, Hashim Nawaz		

== See also ==
- Music of Pakistan
- Sport in Pakistan
- List of songs about Pakistan
- Ali Zafar discography
- Aima Baig discography
