= 2023 Quetta Gladiators season =

2023 season of Lahore Qalandars

Quetta Gladiators
2023 season
- Coach: Moin Khan
- Captain: Sarfaraz Ahmed; Mohammad Nawaz
- PSL 2023: League stage
- Most runs: Martin Guptill (310)
- Most wickets: Mohammad Nawaz (9)

Quetta Gladiators is a franchise cricket team that represents Quetta in the Pakistan Super League (PSL). They were one of the six teams that competed in the 2023 Pakistan Super League. The team was coached by Moin Khan, and captained by Sarfaraz Ahmed.

== Squad ==
- Players with international caps are listed in **bold**.
- Ages are given as of 13 February 2023, the date of the first match in the tournament

No.	Name	Nationality	Birth date	Batting style	Bowling style	Year signed	Notes
Batsmen
1	Najibullah Zadran	Afghanistan	28 February 1993 (aged 29)	Left-handed	Right-arm off break	2023	Partial replacement for Jason Roy
11	Abdul Bangalzai	Pakistan	23 March 2003 (aged 19)	Right-handed	Right-arm off break	2022	
17	Yasir Khan	Pakistan	13 April 2002 (aged 20)	Right-handed	—	2023	
20	**Jason Roy**	England	21 July 1990 (aged 32)	Right-handed	Right-arm medium	2022	
31	**Martin Guptill**	New Zealand	30 September 1986 (aged 36)	Right-handed	Right-arm off break	2023	
33	Will Smeed	England	26 October 2001 (aged 21)	Right-handed	Right-arm off break	2022	
59	Saud Shakeel	Pakistan	5 September 1997 (aged 25)	Left-handed	Left-arm orthodox	2023	
96	**Umar Akmal**	Pakistan	26 May 1990 (aged 32)	Right-handed	Right-arm off break	2022	
100	Omair Yousuf	Pakistan	27 December 1998 (aged 24)	Right-handed	—	2023	
—N/a	~~**Ahsan Ali**~~ (Note: Ali suffered an injury which ruled him out of the tournament.)	Pakistan	10 December 1993 (aged 29)	Right-handed	Right-arm leg break	2022	
All-rounders
8	**Mohammad Hafeez**	Pakistan	17 October 1980 (aged 42)	Right-handed	Right-arm off break	2023	Full replacement for Ahsan Ali
9	~~Will Jacks~~ (Note: Jacks withdrew from the tournament due to international duty.)	England	21 November 1998 (aged 24)	Right-handed	Right-arm off break	2023	
21	**Mohammad Nawaz**	Pakistan	21 March 1994 (aged 28)	Left-handed	Left-arm orthodox	2016	Vice Captain
29	Dwaine Pretorius	South Africa	29 March 1989 (aged 33)	Right-handed	Right-arm medium-fast	2023	Partial replacement for Odean Smith
32	Qais Ahmad	Afghanistan	21 March 1994 (aged 28)	Right-handed	Right-arm leg break	2023	Full replacement for Wanindu Hasaranga
49	~~**Wanindu Hasaranga**~~ (Note: Hasaranga was unable to participate due to NOC issues.)	Sri Lanka	29 July 1997 (aged 25)	Right-handed	Right-arm leg break	2023	
95	**Iftikhar Ahmed**	Pakistan	3 September 1990 (aged 32)	Right-handed	Right-arm off break	2022	
Wicket-keepers
25	Bismillah Khan	Pakistan	1 March 1990 (aged 32)	Right-handed	—	2023	Partial replacement for Sarfaraz Ahmed
54	**Sarfaraz Ahmed**	Pakistan	22 May 1987 (aged 35)	Right-handed	—	2016	Captain
Bowlers
7	Muhammad Zahid	Pakistan	16 March 1994 (aged 28)	Right-handed	Right-arm fast	2023	
13	Umaid Asif	Pakistan	30 April 1984 (aged 38)	Right-handed	Right-arm medium-fast	2023	
53	Nuwan Thushara	Sri Lanka	6 August 1994 (aged 28)	Right-handed	Right-arm medium-fast	2023	Partial replacement for Naveen-ul-Haq
58	**Odean Smith**	West Indies	1 November 1996 (aged 26)	Right-handed	Right-arm medium	2023	
71	**Naseem Shah**	Pakistan	15 February 2003 (aged 19)	Right-handed	Right-arm fast	2019	
78	**Naveen-ul-Haq**	Afghanistan	23 September 1999 (aged 23)	Right-handed	Right-arm medium-fast	2022	
87	**Mohammad Hasnain**	Pakistan	5 April 2000 (aged 22)	Right-handed	Right-arm fast	2019	Ambassador
97	Aimal Khan	Pakistan	17 October 2004 (aged 18)	Right-handed	Right-arm fast	2023	

- Source: Cricinfo

== Management and coaching staff ==
Name	Position
Moin Khan	Head coach
Umar Gul	Bowling coach
Viv Richards	Mentor

== Kit manufacturers and sponsors ==
Shirt sponsor (chest)	Shirt sponsor (back)	Chest branding	Sleeve branding
BJ Sports	MCW Sports	F&A Global	Domino's

Playing kit

== Season standings ==
=== Points table ===
Pos	Team	Pld	W	L	NR	Pts	NRR
1	Lahore Qalandars (C)	10	7	3	0	14	0.915
2	Multan Sultans (R)	10	6	4	0	12	0.500
3	Islamabad United (4th)	10	6	4	0	12	−0.708
4	Peshawar Zalmi (3rd)	10	5	5	0	10	−0.452
5	Karachi Kings	10	3	7	0	6	0.756
6	Quetta Gladiators	10	3	7	0	6	−1.066

Source: ESPNcricinfo
- The top 4 teams qualified for the playoffs.
- Advances to Qualifier.
- Advances to Eliminator 1.

Notes:

- C = Champions;
- R = Runner-up;
- (x) = Position at the end of the tournament

== Group fixtures ==
Match 3
15 February 2023
18:00 (N)
Scorecard

Quetta Gladiators; 110 (18.5 overs)	v	Multan Sultans (H); 111/1 (13.3 overs)
Jason Roy 27 (18); Ihsanullah 5/12 (4 overs)		Rilee Rossouw 78* (42); Nuwan Thushara 1/21 (2 overs)

Multan Sultans won by 9 wickets
Multan Cricket Stadium, Multan
Umpires: Faisal Afridi (Pak) and Asif Yaqoob (Pak)
Player of the match: Ihsanullah (Multan Sultans)

- Multan Sultans won the toss and elected to field.

Match 6
18 February 2023
19:00 (N)
Scorecard

Quetta Gladiators; 168/7 (20 overs)	v	Karachi Kings (H); 162/5 (20 overs)
Martin Guptill 117 (67); Imad Wasim 3/16 (4 overs)		Shoaib Malik 71* (49); Mohammad Hasnain 2/29 (4 overs)

Quetta Gladiators won by 6 runs
National Stadium, Karachi
Umpires: Ahsan Raza (Pak) and Alex Wharf (Eng)
Player of the match: Martin Guptill (Quetta Gladiators)

- Karachi Kings won the toss and elected to field.

Match 9
20 February 2023
19:00 (N)
Scorecard

Quetta Gladiators; 154/4 (20 overs)	v	Peshawar Zalmi; 157/6 (18.3 overs)
Iftikhar Ahmed 50* (34); Usman Qadir 2/26 (4 overs)		James Neesham 38 (23); Mohammad Hasnain 3/13 (4 overs)

Peshawar Zalmi won by 4 wickets
National Stadium, Karachi
Umpires: Alex Wharf (Eng) and Ruchira Palliyaguruge (SL)
Player of the match: James Neesham (Peshawar Zalmi)

- Peshawar Zalmi won the toss and elected to field.

Match 10
21 February 2023
19:00 (N)
Scorecard

Lahore Qalandars; 198/6 (20 overs)	v	Quetta Gladiators; 135/8 (20 overs)
Shai Hope 47 (32); Qais Ahmad 2/36 (4 overs)		Jason Roy 48 (30); Shaheen Afridi 3/22 (4 overs)

Lahore Qalandars won by 63 runs
National Stadium, Karachi
Umpires: Alex Wharf (Eng) and Ruchira Palliyaguruge (SL)
Player of the match: Shaheen Afridi (Lahore Qalandars)

- Quetta Gladiators won the toss and elected to field.

Match 13
24 February 2023
19:00 (N)
Scorecard

Islamabad United; 220/6 (20 overs)	v	Quetta Gladiators; 157 (19.1 overs)
Azam Khan 97 (42); Odean Smith 2/41 (4 overs)		Mohammad Hafeez 48 (26); Fazalhaq Farooqi 3/28 (3.1 overs)

Islamabad United won by 63 runs
National Stadium, Karachi
Umpires: Michael Gough (Eng) and Rashid Riaz (Pak)
Player of the match: Azam Khan (Islamabad United)

- Islamabad United won the toss and elected to bat.
- Aimal Khan (Quetta Gladiators) made his T20 debut.

Match 18
2 March 2023
19:00 (N)
Scorecard

(H) Lahore Qalandars; 148 (19.2 overs)	v	Quetta Gladiators; 131/7 (20 overs)
Sikandar Raza 71* (34); Mohammed Nawaz 2/19 (3 overs)		Will Smeed 32 (25); Haris Rauf 3/22 (4 overs)

Lahore Qalandars won by 17 runs
Gaddafi Stadium, Lahore
Umpires: Ahsan Raza (Pak) and Martin Saggers (Eng)
Player of the match: Sikandar Raza (Lahore Qalandars)

- Quetta Gladiators won the toss and elected to field.

Match 21
5 March 2023
19:00 (N)
Scorecard

Quetta Gladiators; 179/6 (20 overs)	v	Islamabad United (H); 183/8 (19.3 overs)
Najibullah Zadran 59 (34); Fazalhaq Farooqi 3/25 (4 overs)		Colin Munro 63 (29); Umaid Asif 3/37 (4 overs)

Islamabad United won by 2 wickets
Rawalpindi Cricket Stadium, Rawalpindi
Umpires: Aleem Dar (Pak) and Rashid Riaz (Pak)
Player of the match: Fazalhaq Farooqi (Islamabad United)

- Islamabad United won the toss and elected to field.
- As a result of this match, Islamabad United qualified for the playoffs.

Match 22
6 March 2023
19:00 (N)
Scorecard

Karachi Kings; 164/6 (20 overs)	v	Quetta Gladiators; 168/6 (19.5 overs)
Adam Rossington 69 (45); Aimal Khan 2/26 (4 overs)		Martin Guptill 86* (56); Tabraiz Shamsi 2/20 (4 overs)

Quetta Gladiators won by 4 wickets
Rawalpindi Cricket Stadium, Rawalpindi
Umpires: Martin Saggers (Eng) and Rashid Riaz (Pak)
Player of the match: Martin Guptill (Quetta Gladiators)

- Quetta Gladiators won the toss and elected to field.

Match 25
8 March 2023
19:00 (N)
Scorecard

Peshawar Zalmi; 240/2 (20 overs)	v	Quetta Gladiators; 243/2 (18.2 overs)
Babar Azam 115 (65); Dwaine Pretorius 1/40 (4 overs)		Jason Roy 145* (63); Mujeeb Ur Rahman 1/38 (4 overs)

Quetta Gladiators won by 8 wickets
Rawalpindi Cricket Stadium, Rawalpindi
Umpires: Ahsan Raza (Pak) and Martin Saggers (Eng)
Player of the match: Jason Roy (Quetta Gladiators)

- Peshawar Zalmi won the toss and elected to bat.
- This was the second highest run-chase in PSL history.

Match 28
11 March 2023
19:00 (N)
Scorecard

Multan Sultans; 262/3 (20 overs)	v	Quetta Gladiators; 253/8 (20 overs)
Usman Khan 120 (43); Qais Ahmad 2/77 (4 overs)		Omair Yousuf 67 (36); Abbas Afridi 5/47 (4 overs)

Multan Sultans won by 9 runs
Rawalpindi Cricket Stadium, Rawalpindi
Umpires: Alex Wharf (Eng) and Martin Saggers (Eng)
Player of the match: Abbas Afridi (Multan Sultans)

- Quetta Gladiators won the toss and elected to field.
- Usman Khan (Multan Sultans) scored the fastest century in terms of balls (36) in PSL history.
- This was the highest total scored by a team in PSL history.
- As a result of this match, Peshawar Zalmi qualified for the playoffs.

== Statistics ==
=== Most runs ===
Player	Innings	Runs	High score	50s	100s
Martin Guptill	9	310	117	1	1
Jason Roy	7	245	145*	0	1
Iftikhar Ahmed	9	189	53	2	0
Sarfaraz Ahmed	8	162	41	0	0
Mohammad Hafeez	6	135	48	0	0

- Source: ESPNcricinfo

=== Most wickets ===
Player	Innings	Wickets	Best bowling
Mohammad Nawaz	10	9	2/17
Mohammad Hasnain	6	8	3/13
Naseem Shah	9	7	2/31
Qais Ahmad	4	6	2/36
Odean Smith	6	5	2/41

- Source: ESPNcricinfo
