= 2023 Islamabad United season =

2023 season of Islamabad United

Islamabad United
2023 season
- Coach: Azhar Mahmood
- Captain: Shadab Khan
- Ground(s): Rawalpindi Cricket Stadium
- PSL 2023: Play-offs (4th)
- Most runs: Colin Munro (298)
- Most wickets: Hasan Ali (13)

Islamabad United is a franchise cricket team that represents Islamabad in the Pakistan Super League (PSL). They were one of the six teams that competed in the 2023 PSL season. The team was coached by Azhar Mahmood, and captained by Shadab Khan.

== Squad ==
- Players with international caps are listed in **bold**.
- Ages are given as of 13 February 2023, the date of the first match in the tournament.

No.	Name	Nationality	Birth date	Batting style	Bowing style	Year signed	Notes
Batsmen
1	**Paul Stirling**	Ireland	3 September 1990 (aged 32)	Right-handed	Right-arm off break	2021	
10	**Alex Hales**	England	3 January 1989 (aged 34)	Right-handed	Right-arm medium	2021	
12	**Sohaib Maqsood**	Pakistan	15 April 1987 (aged 35)	Right-handed	Right-arm off break	2023	
45	**Asif Ali**	Pakistan	1 October 1991 (aged 31)	Right-handed	Right-arm off break	2016	Vice captain
72	**Rassie van der Dussen**	South Africa	7 February 1989 (aged 34)	Right-handed	Right-arm leg break	2023	Partial replacement for Moeen Ali
77	Hassan Nawaz	Pakistan	21 August 2004 (aged 18)	Right-handed	Right-arm off break	2023	
82	**Colin Munro**	New Zealand	11 March 1987 (aged 35)	Left-handed	Right-arm medium fast	2020	
All-rounders
7	**Shadab Khan**	Pakistan	4 October 1998 (aged 24)	Right-handed	Right-arm leg break	2017	Captain
18	**Moeen Ali**	England	18 July 1987 (aged 35)	Left-handed	Right-arm off break	2023	
41	**Faheem Ashraf**	Pakistan	16 January 1994 (aged 29)	Left-handed	Right-arm fast medium	2018	
53	Mubasir Khan	Pakistan	24 April 2002 (aged 20)	Right-handed	Right-arm off break	2022	
59	**Tom Curran**	England	12 March 1995 (aged 27)	Right-handed	Right-arm fast-medium	2023	
74	**Mohammad Wasim**	Pakistan	25 August 2001 (aged 21)	Right-handed	Right-arm medium fast	2021	
Wicket-keepers
21	**Rahmanullah Gurbaz**	Afghanistan	28 November 2001 (aged 21)	Right-handed	—	2022	
23	**Azam Khan**	Pakistan	10 August 1998 (aged 24)	Right-handed	—	2022	
Bowlers
5	**Fazalhaq Farooqi**	Afghanistan	22 September 2000 (aged 22)	Right-handed	Left-arm fast-medium	2023	
11	**Rumman Raees**	Pakistan	18 October 1991 (aged 31)	Right-handed	Right-arm fast medium	2023	
17	**Zafar Gohar**	Pakistan	1 February 1995 (aged 28)	Left-handed	Left-arm orthodox	2018	
30	Zeeshan Zameer	Pakistan	10 August 2002 (aged 20)	Right-handed	Right-arm fast medium	2022	
32	**Hasan Ali**	Pakistan	2 July 1994 (aged 28)	Right-handed	Right-arm medium fast	2021	
37	Gus Atkinson	England	19 January 1998 (aged 25)	Right-handed	Right-arm fast	2023	Partial replacement for Rahmanullah Gurbaz
40	**Abrar Ahmed**	Pakistan	16 October 1998 (aged 24)	Right-handed	Right-arm leg break	2023	
60	**Tymal Mills**	England	12 July 1992 (aged 30)	Right-handed	Left-arm fast-medium	2023	Partial replacement for Alex Hales

- Source: Cricinfo

== Administration and support staff ==
Position	Name
General manager	Rehan Ul Haq
Head coach	Azhar Mahmood
Assistant coach	Saeed Ajmal
Batting coach	Ashley Wright
Bowling coach	James Franklin
Performance coach	Hanif Malik
Team doctor	Jason Pilgram

- Source: Islamabad United

== Kit manufacturers and sponsors ==
Shirt sponsor (chest)	Shirt sponsor (back)	Chest branding	Sleeve branding
Sabroso	Ufone	Fast Cables	MOCCA, Tetra Pak, Foodpanda

Home kit

Away kit

Source: Sports Mint Media

== Season standings ==
=== Points table ===
Pos	Team	Pld	W	L	NR	Pts	NRR
1	Lahore Qalandars (C)	10	7	3	0	14	0.915
2	Multan Sultans (R)	10	6	4	0	12	0.500
3	Islamabad United (4th)	10	6	4	0	12	−0.708
4	Peshawar Zalmi (3rd)	10	5	5	0	10	−0.452
5	Karachi Kings	10	3	7	0	6	0.756
6	Quetta Gladiators	10	3	7	0	6	−1.066

Source: ESPNcricinfo
- The top 4 teams qualified for the playoffs.
- Advances to Qualifier.
- Advances to Eliminator 1.

Notes:

- C = Champions;
- R = Runner-up;
- (x) = Position at the end of the tournament

== Group fixtures ==
Match 4
16 February 2023
19:00 (N)
Scorecard

(H) Karachi Kings; 173/7 (20 overs)	v	Islamabad United; 178/6 (18.2 overs)
Haider Ali 59 (45); Rumman Raees 2/26 (4 overs)		Colin Munro 58 (28); Mohammad Amir 2/30 (4 overs)

Islamabad United won by 4 wickets
National Stadium, Karachi
Umpires: Ruchira Palliyaguruge (SL) and Alex Wharf (Eng)
Player of the match: Colin Munro (Islamabad United)

- Islamabad United won the toss and elected to field.

Match 7
19 February 2023
14:00
Scorecard

(H) Multan Sultans; 190/4 (20 overs)	v	Islamabad United; 138 (17.5 overs)
David Miller 52 (25); Rumman Raees 1/25 (3 overs)		Rassie van der Dussen 49 (32); Abbas Afridi 4/22 (3 overs)

Multan Sultans won by 52 runs
Multan Cricket Stadium, Multan
Umpires: Faisal Afridi (Pak) and Asif Yaqoob (Pak)
Player of the match: Abbas Afridi (Multan Sultans)

- Islamabad United won the toss and elected to field.

Match 12
23 February 2023
19:00 (N)
Scorecard

Peshawar Zalmi; 156/8 (20 overs)	v	Islamabad United; 159/4 (14.5 overs)
Babar Azam 75* (58); Hasan Ali 3/35 (4 overs)		Rahmanullah Gurbaz 62 (31); James Neesham 1/21 (2 overs)

Islamabad United won by 6 wickets
National Stadium, Karachi
Umpires: Michael Gough (Eng) and Richard Illingworth (Eng)
Player of the match: Hasan Ali (Islamabad United)

- Islamabad United won the toss and elected to field.

Match 13
24 February 2023
19:00 (N)
Scorecard

Islamabad United; 220/6 (20 overs)	v	Quetta Gladiators; 157 (19.1 overs)
Azam Khan 97 (42); Odean Smith 2/41 (4 overs)		Mohammad Hafeez 48 (26); Fazalhaq Farooqi 3/28 (3.1 overs)

Islamabad United won by 63 runs
National Stadium, Karachi
Umpires: Michael Gough (Eng) and Rashid Riaz (Pak)
Player of the match: Azam Khan (Islamabad United)

- Islamabad United won the toss and elected to bat.
- Aimal Khan (Quetta Gladiators) made his T20 debut.

Match 16
27 February 2023
19:00 (N)
Scorecard

(H) Lahore Qalandars; 200/7 (20 overs)	v	Islamabad United; 90 (13.5 overs)
Abdullah Shafique 45 (24); Tom Curran 3/34 (4 overs)		Rahmanullah Gurbaz 23 (17); David Wiese 3/17 (3 overs)

Lahore Qalandars won by 110 runs
Gaddafi Stadium, Lahore
Umpires: Faisal Afridi (Pak) and Michael Gough (Eng)
Player of the match: David Wiese (Lahore Qalandars)

- Lahore Qalandars won the toss and elected to bat.

Match 19
3 March 2023
19:00 (N)
Scorecard

Karachi Kings; 201/5 (20 overs)	v	Islamabad United (H); 204/4 (19.2 overs)
Imad Wasim 92* (54); Tom Curran 2/43 (4 overs)		Azam Khan 72* (41); Mohammad Amir 1/40 (4 overs); Tabraiz Shamsi 1/40 (4 overs)

Islamabad United won by 6 wickets
Rawalpindi Cricket Stadium, Rawalpindi
Umpires: Michael Gough (Eng) and Richard Illingworth (Eng)
Player of the match: Azam Khan (Islamabad United)

- Karachi Kings won the toss and elected to bat.

Match 21
5 March 2023
19:00 (N)
Scorecard

Quetta Gladiators; 179/6 (20 overs)	v	Islamabad United (H); 183/8 (19.3 overs)
Najibullah Zadran 59 (34); Fazalhaq Farooqi 3/25 (4 overs)		Colin Munro 63 (29); Umaid Asif 3/37 (4 overs)

Islamabad United won by 2 wickets
Rawalpindi Cricket Stadium, Rawalpindi
Umpires: Aleem Dar (Pak) and Rashid Riaz (Pak)
Player of the match: Fazalhaq Farooqi (Islamabad United)

- Islamabad United won the toss and elected to field.
- As a result of this match, Islamabad United qualified for the playoffs.

Match 24
7 March 2023
19:00 (N)
Scorecard

Multan Sultans; 205/5 (20 overs)	v	Islamabad United (H); 209/8 (19.5 overs)
Shan Masood 75 (50); Shadab Khan 2/26 (4 overs)		Faheem Ashraf 51* (26); Anwar Ali 3/33 (4 overs)

Islamabad United won by 2 wickets
Rawalpindi Cricket Stadium, Rawalpindi
Umpires: Faisal Afridi (Pak) and Rashid Riaz (Pak)
Player of the match: Faheem Ashraf (Islamabad United)

- Islamabad United won the toss and elected to field.

Match 26
9 March 2023
19:00 (N)
Scorecard

Lahore Qalandars; 226/5 (20 overs)	v	Islamabad United (H); 107 (15.1 overs)
Fakhar Zaman 115 (57); Fazalhaq Farooqi 3/40 (4 overs)		Hasan Ali 18 (13); Rashid Khan 4/21 (4 overs)

Lahore Qalandars won by 119 runs
Rawalpindi Cricket Stadium, Rawalpindi
Umpires: Faisal Afridi (Pak) and Aleem Dar (Pak)
Player of the match: Fakhar Zaman (Lahore Qalandars)

- Lahore Qalandars won the toss and elected to bat.
- This was the largest victory in PSL history in terms of runs.

Match 29
12 March 2023
14:00
Scorecard

Peshawar Zalmi; 179/8 (20 overs)	v	Islamabad United (H); 166 (19.4 overs)
Mohammad Haris 79 (39); Hasan Ali 3/39 (4 overs)		Faheem Ashraf 38 (13); Khurram Shahzad 3/13 (1.4 overs)

Peshawar Zalmi won by 13 runs
Rawalpindi Cricket Stadium, Rawalpindi
Umpires: Ahsan Raza (Pak) and Martin Saggers (Eng)
Player of the match: Mohammad Haris (Peshawar Zalmi)

- Islamabad United won the toss and elected to field.

== Playoffs ==
=== Eliminator 1 ===
Match 32
16 March 2023
19:00 (N)
Scorecard

Peshawar Zalmi; 183/8 (20 overs)	v	Islamabad United; 171/6 (20 overs)
Babar Azam 64 (39); Shadab Khan 2/40 (4 overs)		Sohaib Maqsood 60 (48); Salman Irshad 2/18 (4 overs)

Peshawar Zalmi won by 12 runs
Gaddafi Stadium, Lahore
Umpires: Faisal Afridi (Pak) and Ahsan Raza (Pak)
Player of the match: Aamer Jamal (Peshawar Zalmi)

- Islamabad United won the toss and elected to field.

== Statistics ==
=== Most runs ===
Player	Innings	Runs	High score	50s	100s
Colin Munro	11	298	63	2	0
Azam Khan	9	282	97	2	0
Faheem Ashraf	10	215	51*	1	0
Rahmanullah Gurbaz	8	176	62	1	0
Rassie van der Dussen	6	148	49	0	0

- Source: ESPNcricinfo

=== Most wickets ===
Player	Innings	Wickets	Best bowling
Hasan Ali	8	13	3/35
Shadab Khan	11	12	2/24
Fazalhaq Farooqi	6	11	3/25
Tom Curran	5	8	3/34
Mohammad Wasim	6	8	2/38

- Source: ESPNcricinfo
