= 2023 Karachi Kings season =

2023 season of Karachi Kings

Karachi Kings
2023 season
- Coach: Johan Botha
- Captain: Imad Wasim
- Ground(s): National Stadium
- PSL 2023: League stage
- Most runs: Imad Wasim (404)
- Most wickets: Mohammad Amir (9); Imad Wasim (9)

Karachi Kings is a franchise cricket team that represents Karachi in the Pakistan Super League (PSL). They were one of the six teams that competed in the 2023 Pakistan Super League. The team was coached by Johan Botha, and captained by Imad Wasim. Wasim Akram was the president of Karachi Kings.

== Squad ==
- Players with international caps are listed in **bold**.
- Ages are given as of 13 February 2023, the date of the first match in the tournament.

No.	Name	Nationality	Birth date	Batting style	Bowling style	Year signed	Notes
Batters
14	**James Vince**	England	14 March 1991 (aged 31)	Right-handed	Right-arm medium	2023	
46	**Haider Ali**	Pakistan	2 October 2000 (aged 22)	Right-handed	—	2023	
75	Irfan Khan	Pakistan	28 December 2002 (aged 20)	Right-handed	Right-arm medium-fast	2023	
96	Tayyab Tahir	Pakistan	26 July 1993 (aged 29)	Right-handed	Right-arm leg break	2023	
98	**Sharjeel Khan**	Pakistan	14 August 1989 (aged 33)	Left-handed	Right-arm leg break	2020	
All-rounders
9	**Imad Wasim**	Pakistan	18 December 1988 (aged 34)	Left-handed	Left-arm orthodox	2016	Captain
12	**Aamer Yamin**	Pakistan	26 June 1990 (aged 32)	Right-handed	Right-arm medium-fast	2019	
18	**Shoaib Malik**	Pakistan	1 February 1982 (aged 41)	Right-handed	Right-arm off break	2023	
26	James Fuller	New Zealand	24 January 1990 (aged 33)	Right-handed	Right-arm fast	2023	
31	**Ben Cutting**	Australia	30 January 1987 (aged 36)	Right-handed	Right-arm fast-medium	2023	
49	Qasim Akram	Pakistan	1 December 2002 (aged 20)	Right-handed	Right-arm off break	2021	
97	Faisal Akram	Pakistan	20 August 2003 (aged 19)	Left-handed	Left-arm unorthodox	2022	Partial replacement for Tabraiz Shamsi
Wicket-keepers
13	**Matthew Wade**	Australia	26 December 1987 (aged 35)	Left-handed	Right-arm medium-fast	2023	
17	Adam Rossington	England	5 May 1993 (aged 29)	Right-handed	—	2023	Partial replacement for James Vince
61	Muhammad Akhlaq	Pakistan	12 November 1992 (aged 30)	Right-handed	Right-arm medium-fast	2023	
Bowlers
5	**Mohammad Amir**	Pakistan	13 April 1992 (aged 30)	Left-handed	Left-arm fast-medium	2016	
11	Mohammad Umar	Pakistan	27 December 1999 (aged 23)	Right-handed	Right-arm medium-fast	2023	
68	**Andrew Tye**	Australia	12 December 1986 (aged 36)	Right-handed	Right-arm medium-fast	2023	
70	**Muhammad Musa**	Pakistan	28 August 2000 (aged 22)	Right-handed	Right-arm medium-fast	2023	
88	**Akif Javed**	Pakistan	10 October 2000 (aged 22)	Right-handed	Left-arm fast-medium	2023	Full replacement for Mir Hamza
90	**Tabraiz Shamsi**	South Africa	18 February 1990 (aged 32)	Left-handed	Left-arm unorthodox	2023	
92	~~**Mir Hamza**~~ (Note: Hamza suffered an injury which ruled him out of the tournament.)	Pakistan	10 September 1992 (aged 30)	Left-handed	Left-arm fast-medium	2022	
99	**Imran Tahir**	South Africa	27 March 1979 (aged 43)	Right-handed	Right-arm leg break	2023	

- Source: Cricinfo

== Management and coaching staff ==
Name	Position
Tariq Wasi	CEO & Team manager
Wasim Akram	President and mentor
Johan Botha	Head coach
Michael Smith	Assistant coach
Ravi Bopara	Batting coach
Dougie Brown	Bowling coach
Ibrahim Qureshi	Fitness trainer

- Source: Mykhel

== Kit manufacturers and sponsors ==
GFS Builders and Developers were the official housing partner of Karachi Kings.

Shirt sponsor (chest)	Shirt sponsor (back)	Chest branding	Sleeve branding
1xBat	BankIslami	Pepsi	Imtiaz Super Market, Mughal Steel, ARY Laguna

Playing kit

== Season standings ==
=== Points table ===
Pos	Team	Pld	W	L	NR	Pts	NRR
1	Lahore Qalandars (C)	10	7	3	0	14	0.915
2	Multan Sultans (R)	10	6	4	0	12	0.500
3	Islamabad United (4th)	10	6	4	0	12	−0.708
4	Peshawar Zalmi (3rd)	10	5	5	0	10	−0.452
5	Karachi Kings	10	3	7	0	6	0.756
6	Quetta Gladiators	10	3	7	0	6	−1.066

Source: ESPNcricinfo
- The top 4 teams qualified for the playoffs.
- Advances to Qualifier.
- Advances to Eliminator 1.

Notes:

- C = Champions;
- R = Runner-up;
- (x) = Position at the end of the tournament

== Group fixtures ==
14 February 2023	Peshawar Zalmi; 199/5 (20 overs)	v	Karachi Kings (H); 197/5 (20 overs)	Peshawar Zalmi won by 2 runs
20:00 Match 2 Scorecard	Peshawar Zalmi; 199/5 (20 overs)	v	Karachi Kings (H); 197/5 (20 overs)	National Stadium, Karachi; Umpires: Ahsan Raza (Pak) and Alex Wharf (Eng); Player of the match: Tom Kohler-Cadmore (Peshawar Zalmi)
20:00 Match 2 Scorecard	Tom Kohler-Cadmore 92 (50); Mir Hamza 1/13 (2 overs)		Imad Wasim 80* (47); James Neesham 2/26 (4 overs)	National Stadium, Karachi; Umpires: Ahsan Raza (Pak) and Alex Wharf (Eng); Player of the match: Tom Kohler-Cadmore (Peshawar Zalmi)
Karachi Kings won the toss and elected to field.; Sufiyan Muqeem and Khurram Shahzad (Peshawar Zalmi) both made their T20 debuts.				National Stadium, Karachi; Umpires: Ahsan Raza (Pak) and Alex Wharf (Eng); Player of the match: Tom Kohler-Cadmore (Peshawar Zalmi)

16 February 2023	(H) Karachi Kings; 173/7 (20 overs)	v	Islamabad United; 178/6 (18.2 overs)	Islamabad United won by 4 wickets
19:00 Match 4 Scorecard	(H) Karachi Kings; 173/7 (20 overs)	v	Islamabad United; 178/6 (18.2 overs)	National Stadium, Karachi; Umpires: Ruchira Palliyaguruge (SL) and Alex Wharf (Eng); Player of the match: Colin Munro (Islamabad United)
19:00 Match 4 Scorecard	Haider Ali 59 (45); Rumman Raees 2/26 (4 overs)		Colin Munro 58 (28); Mohammad Amir 2/30 (4 overs)	National Stadium, Karachi; Umpires: Ruchira Palliyaguruge (SL) and Alex Wharf (Eng); Player of the match: Colin Munro (Islamabad United)
Islamabad United won the toss and elected to field.				National Stadium, Karachi; Umpires: Ruchira Palliyaguruge (SL) and Alex Wharf (Eng); Player of the match: Colin Munro (Islamabad United)

18 February 2023	Quetta Gladiators; 168/7 (20 overs)	v	Karachi Kings (H); 162/5 (20 overs)	Quetta Gladiators won by 6 runs
19:00 Match 6 Scorecard	Quetta Gladiators; 168/7 (20 overs)	v	Karachi Kings (H); 162/5 (20 overs)	National Stadium, Karachi; Umpires: Ahsan Raza (Pak) and Alex Wharf (Eng); Player of the match: Martin Guptill (Quetta Gladiators)
19:00 Match 6 Scorecard	Martin Guptill 117 (67); Imad Wasim 3/16 (4 overs)		Shoaib Malik 71* (49); Mohammad Hasnain 2/29 (4 overs)	National Stadium, Karachi; Umpires: Ahsan Raza (Pak) and Alex Wharf (Eng); Player of the match: Martin Guptill (Quetta Gladiators)
Karachi Kings won the toss and elected to field.				National Stadium, Karachi; Umpires: Ahsan Raza (Pak) and Alex Wharf (Eng); Player of the match: Martin Guptill (Quetta Gladiators)

19 February 2023	(H) Karachi Kings; 185/5 (20 overs)	v	Lahore Qalandars; 118 (17.3 overs)	Karachi Kings won by 67 runs
19:00 Match 8 Scorecard	(H) Karachi Kings; 185/5 (20 overs)	v	Lahore Qalandars; 118 (17.3 overs)	National Stadium, Karachi; Umpires: Ahsan Raza (Pak) and Alex Wharf (Eng); Player of the match: Imad Wasim (Karachi Kings)
19:00 Match 8 Scorecard	James Vince 46 (36); Liam Dawson 1/30 (3 overs)		Mirza Tahir Baig 45 (39); Akif Javed 4/28 (3.3 overs)	National Stadium, Karachi; Umpires: Ahsan Raza (Pak) and Alex Wharf (Eng); Player of the match: Imad Wasim (Karachi Kings)
Lahore Qalandars won the toss and elected to field.				National Stadium, Karachi; Umpires: Ahsan Raza (Pak) and Alex Wharf (Eng); Player of the match: Imad Wasim (Karachi Kings)

22 February 2023	(H) Multan Sultans; 196/2 (20 overs)	v	Karachi Kings; 193/5 (20 overs)	Multan Sultans won by 3 runs
19:00 Match 11 Scorecard	(H) Multan Sultans; 196/2 (20 overs)	v	Karachi Kings; 193/5 (20 overs)	Multan Cricket Stadium, Multan; Umpires: Martin Saggers (Eng) and Shozab Raza (Pak); Player of the match: Mohammed Rizwan (Multan Sultans)
19:00 Match 11 Scorecard	Mohammed Rizwan 110* (64); Shoaib Malik 1/29 (4 overs)		James Vince 75 (34); Abbas Afridi 2/55 (4 overs)	Multan Cricket Stadium, Multan; Umpires: Martin Saggers (Eng) and Shozab Raza (Pak); Player of the match: Mohammed Rizwan (Multan Sultans)
Karachi Kings won the toss and elected to field.				Multan Cricket Stadium, Multan; Umpires: Martin Saggers (Eng) and Shozab Raza (Pak); Player of the match: Mohammed Rizwan (Multan Sultans)

26 February 2023	(H) Karachi Kings; 167/3 (20 overs)	v	Multan Sultans; 101 (16.3 overs)	Karachi Kings won by 66 runs
14:00 Match 14 Scorecard	(H) Karachi Kings; 167/3 (20 overs)	v	Multan Sultans; 101 (16.3 overs)	National Stadium, Karachi; Umpires: Alex Wharf (Eng) and Ahsan Raza (Pak); Player of the match: Tabraiz Shamsi (Karachi Kings)
14:00 Match 14 Scorecard	Tayyab Tahir 65 (46); Ihsanullah 2/22 (4 overs)		Mohammad Rizwan 29 (25); Shoaib Malik 3/16 (3.3 overs)	National Stadium, Karachi; Umpires: Alex Wharf (Eng) and Ahsan Raza (Pak); Player of the match: Tabraiz Shamsi (Karachi Kings)
Multan Sultans won the toss and elected to field.				National Stadium, Karachi; Umpires: Alex Wharf (Eng) and Ahsan Raza (Pak); Player of the match: Tabraiz Shamsi (Karachi Kings)

1 March 2023	Peshawar Zalmi; 197/5 (20 overs)	v	Karachi Kings; 173/8 (20 overs)	Peshawar Zalmi won by 24 runs
19:00 Match 17 Scorecard	Peshawar Zalmi; 197/5 (20 overs)	v	Karachi Kings; 173/8 (20 overs)	Rawalpindi Cricket Stadium, Rawalpindi; Umpires: Michael Gough (Eng) and Richard Illingworth (Eng); Player of the match: Rovman Powell (Peshawar Zalmi)
19:00 Match 17 Scorecard	Rovman Powell 64 (34); Mohammad Amir 4/26 (4 overs)		Imad Wasim 57* (30); Azmatullah Omarzai 3/28 (4 overs)	Rawalpindi Cricket Stadium, Rawalpindi; Umpires: Michael Gough (Eng) and Richard Illingworth (Eng); Player of the match: Rovman Powell (Peshawar Zalmi)
Karachi Kings won the toss and elected to field.				Rawalpindi Cricket Stadium, Rawalpindi; Umpires: Michael Gough (Eng) and Richard Illingworth (Eng); Player of the match: Rovman Powell (Peshawar Zalmi)

3 March 2023	Karachi Kings; 201/5 (20 overs)	v	Islamabad United (H); 204/4 (19.2 overs)	Islamabad United won by 6 wickets
19:00 Match 19 Scorecard	Karachi Kings; 201/5 (20 overs)	v	Islamabad United (H); 204/4 (19.2 overs)	Rawalpindi Cricket Stadium, Rawalpindi; Umpires: Michael Gough (Eng) and Richard Illingworth (Eng); Player of the match: Azam Khan (Islamabad United)
19:00 Match 19 Scorecard	Imad Wasim 92* (54); Tom Curran 2/43 (4 overs)		Azam Khan 72* (41); Mohammad Amir 1/40 (4 overs); Tabraiz Shamsi 1/40 (4 overs)	Rawalpindi Cricket Stadium, Rawalpindi; Umpires: Michael Gough (Eng) and Richard Illingworth (Eng); Player of the match: Azam Khan (Islamabad United)
Karachi Kings won the toss and elected to bat.				Rawalpindi Cricket Stadium, Rawalpindi; Umpires: Michael Gough (Eng) and Richard Illingworth (Eng); Player of the match: Azam Khan (Islamabad United)

6 March 2023	Karachi Kings; 164/6 (20 overs)	v	Quetta Gladiators; 168/6 (19.5 overs)	Quetta Gladiators won by 4 wickets
19:00 Match 22 Scorecard	Karachi Kings; 164/6 (20 overs)	v	Quetta Gladiators; 168/6 (19.5 overs)	Rawalpindi Cricket Stadium, Rawalpindi; Umpires: Martin Saggers (Eng) and Rashid Riaz (Pak); Player of the match: Martin Guptill (Quetta Gladiators)
19:00 Match 22 Scorecard	Adam Rossington 69 (45); Aimal Khan 2/26 (4 overs)		Martin Guptill 86* (56); Tabraiz Shamsi 2/20 (4 overs)	Rawalpindi Cricket Stadium, Rawalpindi; Umpires: Martin Saggers (Eng) and Rashid Riaz (Pak); Player of the match: Martin Guptill (Quetta Gladiators)
Quetta Gladiators won the toss and elected to field.				Rawalpindi Cricket Stadium, Rawalpindi; Umpires: Martin Saggers (Eng) and Rashid Riaz (Pak); Player of the match: Martin Guptill (Quetta Gladiators)

12 March 2023	Karachi Kings; 196/7 (20 overs)	v	Lahore Qalandars (H); 110 (18.5 overs)	Karachi Kings won by 86 runs
19:00 Match 30 Scorecard	Karachi Kings; 196/7 (20 overs)	v	Lahore Qalandars (H); 110 (18.5 overs)	Gaddafi Stadium, Lahore; Umpires: Aleem Dar (Pak) and Rashid Riaz (Pak); Player of the match: Muhammad Akhlaq (Karachi Kings)
19:00 Match 30 Scorecard	Muhammad Akhlaq 51 (36); Hussain Talat 2/24 (3 overs)		Hussain Talat 25 (25); Akif Javed 2/8 (3 overs)	Gaddafi Stadium, Lahore; Umpires: Aleem Dar (Pak) and Rashid Riaz (Pak); Player of the match: Muhammad Akhlaq (Karachi Kings)
Karachi Kings won the toss and elected to bat.				Gaddafi Stadium, Lahore; Umpires: Aleem Dar (Pak) and Rashid Riaz (Pak); Player of the match: Muhammad Akhlaq (Karachi Kings)

== Statistics ==
=== Most runs ===
Player	Innings	Runs	High score	50s	100s
Imad Wasim	10	404	92*	3	0
Matthew Wade	9	224	53	1	0
Shoaib Malik	9	200	71*	2	0
James Vince	5	174	75	1	0
Tayyab Tahir	5	137	65	0	0

- Source: ESPNcricinfo

=== Most wickets ===
Player	Innings	Wickets	Best bowling
Mohammad Amir	7	10	4/26
Imad Wasim	10	10	3/16
Akif Javed	5	8	4/28
Tabraiz Shamsi	4	7	3/18
Aamer Yamin	7	7	3/37

- Source: ESPNcricinfo
