= 2023 Lahore Qalandars season =

2023 season of Lahore Qalandars

Lahore Qalandars
2023 season
- Coach: Aaqib Javed
- Captain: Shaheen Afridi
- Ground(s): Gaddafi Stadium
- PSL 2023: Champions
- Most runs: Fakhar Zaman (429)
- Most wickets: Rashid Khan (20)

Lahore Qalandars is a franchise cricket team that represents Lahore in the Pakistan Super League (PSL). They were one of the six teams that competed in the 2023 Pakistan Super League. The team was coached by Aaqib Javed, and captained by Shaheen Afridi.

== Squad ==
- Players with international caps are listed in **bold**.
- Ages are given as of 13 February 2023, the date of the first match in the tournament.

No.	Name	Nationality	Birth date	Batting style	Bowling style	Year signed	Notes
Batsmen
15	Mirza Tahir Baig	Pakistan	11 March 1999 (aged 23)	Right-handed	—	2023	
39	**Fakhar Zaman**	Pakistan	10 April 1990 (aged 32)	Left-handed	Left-arm orthodox	2017	
57	**Abdullah Shafique**	Pakistan	20 November 1999 (aged 23)	Right-handed	Right-arm off-break	2022	
82	Kamran Ghulam	Pakistan	10 October 1995 (aged 27)	Right-handed	Left-arm orthodox	2022	
88	~~**Harry Brook**~~ (Note: Brook withdrew from the tournament due to international duty.)	England	22 February 1999 (aged 23)	Right-handed	Right-arm medium	2022	
All-rounders
8	**Hussain Talat**	Pakistan	12 February 1996 (aged 27)	Right-handed	Right-arm medium-fast	2023	
24	**Sikandar Raza**	Zimbabwe	24 April 1986 (aged 36)	Right-handed	Right-arm off break	2023	
27	**David Wiese**	Namibia	18 May 1985 (aged 37)	Right-handed	Right-arm fast-medium	2019	Vice-captain
33	Ahsan Hafeez	Pakistan	30 March 1998 (aged 24)	Left-handed	Left-arm orthodox	2023	
83	**Liam Dawson**	England	1 March 1990 (aged 32)	Right-handed	Left-arm orthodox	2023	
Wicket-keepers
7	Shawaiz Irfan	Pakistan	1 November 2003 (aged 19)	Right-handed	—	2023	
11	Shane Dadswell	South Africa	18 November 1997 (aged 25)	Right-handed	—	2023	Full replacement for Harry Brook
13	**Shai Hope**	West Indies	10 November 1993 (aged 29)	Right-handed	Left-arm medium	2023	Full replacement for Kusal Mendis
22	Jordan Cox	England	21 October 2000 (aged 22)	Right-handed	Right-arm off break	2023	
77	**Sam Billings**	England	15 June 1991 (aged 31)	Right-handed	—	2023	Partial replacement for Rashid Khan
	~~**Kusal Mendis**~~ (Note: Mendis was unable to participate due to NOC issues.)	Sri Lanka	2 February 1995 (aged 28)	Right-handed	Right-arm leg break	2023	Partial replacement for Jordan Cox
Bowlers
3	Ahmed Daniyal	Pakistan	21 September 1998 (aged 24)	Right-handed	Right-arm fast	2021	
5	Jalat Khan	Pakistan	17 February 1999 (aged 23)	Left-handed	Left-arm fast	2023	
10	**Shaheen Afridi**	Pakistan	6 April 2000 (aged 22)	Left-handed	Left-arm fast	2018	Captain
12	Zaman Khan	Pakistan	10 September 2001 (aged 21)	Right-handed	Right-arm medium-fast	2022	
19	**Rashid Khan**	Afghanistan	20 September 1998 (aged 24)	Right-handed	Right-arm leg break	2021	
72	Dilbar Hussain	Pakistan	20 February 1993 (aged 29)	Right-handed	Right-arm medium fast	2023	
150	**Haris Rauf**	Pakistan	7 November 1993 (aged 29)	Right-handed	Right-arm fast	2019	

- Source: Cricinfo

== Management and coaching staff ==
Name	Position
Sameen Rana	COO and Manager
Atif Rana	CEO
Aaqib Javed	Director of Cricket Operations and Head coach
Farooq Anwar	Assistant team manager
Mansoor Rana	Batting coach
Waqas Ahmed	Bowling Coach
Shehzad Butt	Fielding coach
Ben Dunk	Power-hitting coach
Hiten Maisuria	Physiotherapist

- Source: Mykhel

== Kit manufacturers and sponsors ==
Shirt sponsor (chest)	Shirt sponsor (back)	Chest branding	Sleeve branding
Qalandars City	MelBet	Mughal Steel	Bank of Punjab, AirSial

Home kit

Away kit

== Season standings ==
=== Points table ===
Pos	Team	Pld	W	L	NR	Pts	NRR
1	Lahore Qalandars (C)	10	7	3	0	14	0.915
2	Multan Sultans (R)	10	6	4	0	12	0.500
3	Islamabad United (4th)	10	6	4	0	12	−0.708
4	Peshawar Zalmi (3rd)	10	5	5	0	10	−0.452
5	Karachi Kings	10	3	7	0	6	0.756
6	Quetta Gladiators	10	3	7	0	6	−1.066

Source: ESPNcricinfo
- The top 4 teams qualified for the playoffs.
- Advances to Qualifier.
- Advances to Eliminator 1.

Notes:

- C = Champions;
- R = Runner-up;
- (x) = Position at the end of the tournament

== Group fixtures ==
Match 1
13 February 2023
20:30 (N)
Scorecard

Lahore Qalandars; 175/6 (20 overs)	v	Multan Sultans (H); 174/6 (20 overs)
Fakhar Zaman 66 (42); Usama Mir 2/25 (4 overs)		Mohammad Rizwan 75 (50); Hussain Talat 1/16 (2 overs)

Lahore Qalandars won by 1 run
Multan Cricket Stadium, Multan
Umpires: Martin Saggers (Eng) and Asif Yaqoob (Pak)
Player of the match: Fakhar Zaman (Lahore Qalandars)

- Multan Sultans won the toss and elected to field.
- Mirza Tahir Baig (Lahore Qalandars) made his T20 debut.

Match 8
19 February 2023
19:00 (N)
Scorecard

(H) Karachi Kings; 185/5 (20 overs)	v	Lahore Qalandars; 118 (17.3 overs)
James Vince 46 (36); Liam Dawson 1/30 (3 overs)		Mirza Tahir Baig 45 (39); Akif Javed 4/28 (3.3 overs)

Karachi Kings won by 67 runs
National Stadium, Karachi
Umpires: Ahsan Raza (Pak) and Alex Wharf (Eng)
Player of the match: Imad Wasim (Karachi Kings)

- Lahore Qalandars won the toss and elected to field.

Match 10
21 February 2023
19:00 (N)
Scorecard

Lahore Qalandars; 198/6 (20 overs)	v	Quetta Gladiators; 135/8 (20 overs)
Shai Hope 47 (32); Qais Ahmad 2/36 (4 overs)		Jason Roy 48 (30); Shaheen Afridi 3/22 (4 overs)

Lahore Qalandars won by 63 runs
National Stadium, Karachi
Umpires: Alex Wharf (Eng) and Ruchira Palliyaguruge (SL)
Player of the match: Shaheen Afridi (Lahore Qalandars)

- Quetta Gladiators won the toss and elected to field.

Match 15
26 February 2023
19:00 (N)
Scorecard

(H) Lahore Qalandars; 241/3 (20 overs)	v	Peshawar Zalmi; 201/9 (20 overs)
Fakhar Zaman 96 (45); Wahab Riaz 2/45 (4 overs)		Tom Kohler-Cadmore 55 (23); Shaheen Afridi 5/40 (4 overs)

Lahore Qalandars won by 40 runs
Gaddafi Stadium, Lahore
Umpires: Faisal Afridi (Pak) and Richard Illingworth (Eng)
Player of the match: Fakhar Zaman (Lahore Qalandars)

- Lahore Qalandars won the toss and elected to bat.
- Saad Masood (Peshawar Zalmi) made his T20 debut.

Match 16
27 February 2023
19:00 (N)
Scorecard

(H) Lahore Qalandars; 200/7 (20 overs)	v	Islamabad United; 90 (13.5 overs)
Abdullah Shafique 45 (24); Tom Curran 3/34 (4 overs)		Rahmanullah Gurbaz 23 (17); David Wiese 3/17 (3 overs)

Lahore Qalandars won by 110 runs
Gaddafi Stadium, Lahore
Umpires: Faisal Afridi (Pak) and Michael Gough (Eng)
Player of the match: David Wiese (Lahore Qalandars)

- Lahore Qalandars won the toss and elected to bat.

Match 18
2 March 2023
19:00 (N)
Scorecard

(H) Lahore Qalandars; 148 (19.2 overs)	v	Quetta Gladiators; 131/7 (20 overs)
Sikandar Raza 71* (34); Mohammed Nawaz 2/19 (3 overs)		Will Smeed 32 (25); Haris Rauf 3/22 (4 overs)

Lahore Qalandars won by 17 runs
Gaddafi Stadium, Lahore
Umpires: Ahsan Raza (Pak) and Martin Saggers (Eng)
Player of the match: Sikandar Raza (Lahore Qalandars)

- Quetta Gladiators won the toss and elected to field.

Match 20
4 March 2023
19:00 (N)
Scorecard

(H) Lahore Qalandars; 180/9 (20 overs)	v	Multan Sultans; 159/7 (20 overs)
Sam Billings 54 (35); Kieron Pollard 2/16 (2 overs)		Kieron Pollard 39 (28); Rashid Khan 3/15 (4 overs)

Lahore Qalandars won by 21 runs
Gaddafi Stadium, Lahore
Umpires: Faisal Afridi (Pak) and Martin Saggers (Eng)
Player of the match: Rashid Khan (Lahore Qalandars)

- Lahore Qalandars won the toss and elected to bat.
- As a result of this match, Lahore Qalandars qualified for the playoffs.

Match 23
7 March 2023
14:00
Scorecard

Peshawar Zalmi; 207 (19.3 overs)	v	Lahore Qalandars; 172 (19.4 overs)
Saim Ayub 68 (36); Shaheen Afridi 4/31 (4 overs)		Hussain Talat 63 (37); Wahab Riaz 3/17 (4 overs)

Peshawar Zalmi won by 35 runs
Rawalpindi Cricket Stadium, Rawalpindi
Umpires: Alex Wharf (Eng) and Asif Yaqoob (Pak)
Player of the match: Saim Ayub (Peshawar Zalmi)

- Peshawar Zalmi won the toss and elected to bat.
- Shawaiz Irfan (Lahore Qalandars) made his T20 debut.

Match 26
9 March 2023
19:00 (N)
Scorecard

Lahore Qalandars; 226/5 (20 overs)	v	Islamabad United (H); 107 (15.1 overs)
Fakhar Zaman 115 (57); Fazalhaq Farooqi 3/40 (4 overs)		Hasan Ali 18 (13); Rashid Khan 4/21 (4 overs)

Lahore Qalandars won by 119 runs
Rawalpindi Cricket Stadium, Rawalpindi
Umpires: Faisal Afridi (Pak) and Aleem Dar (Pak)
Player of the match: Fakhar Zaman (Lahore Qalandars)

- Lahore Qalandars won the toss and elected to bat.
- This was the largest victory in PSL history in terms of runs.

Match 30
12 March 2023
19:00 (N)
Scorecard

Karachi Kings; 196/7 (20 overs)	v	Lahore Qalandars (H); 110 (18.5 overs)
Muhammad Akhlaq 51 (36); Hussain Talat 2/24 (3 overs)		Hussain Talat 25 (25); Akif Javed 2/8 (3 overs)

Karachi Kings won by 86 runs
Gaddafi Stadium, Lahore
Umpires: Aleem Dar (Pak) and Rashid Riaz (Pak)
Player of the match: Muhammad Akhlaq (Karachi Kings)

- Karachi Kings won the toss and elected to bat.

== Playoffs ==
=== Qualifier ===
Match 31
15 March 2023
19:00 (N)
Scorecard

Multan Sultans; 160/5 (20 overs)	v	Lahore Qalandars (H); 76 (14.3 overs)
Kieron Pollard 57 (34); Haris Rauf 3/34 (4 overs)		Sam Billings 19 (27); Sheldon Cottrell 3/20 (3 overs)

Multan Sultans won by 84 runs
Gaddafi Stadium, Lahore
Umpires: Aleem Dar (Pak) and Alex Wharf (Eng)
Player of the match: Kieron Pollard (Multan Sultans)

- Multan Sultans won the toss and elected to bat.

=== Eliminator 2 ===
Match 33
17 March 2023
19:00 (N)
Scorecard

Peshawar Zalmi; 171/5 (20 overs)	v	Lahore Qalandars (H); 176/6 (18.5 overs)
Mohammad Haris 85 (54); Zaman Khan 2/20 (3 overs)		Mirza Tahir Baig 54 (42); Azmatullah Omarzai 2/30 (4 overs)

Lahore Qalandars won by 4 wickets
Gaddafi Stadium, Lahore
Umpires: Ahsan Raza (Pak) and Martin Saggers (Eng)
Player of the match: Mirza Tahir Baig (Lahore Qalandars)

- Peshawar Zalmi won the toss and elected to bat.
- Ahsan Hafeez (Lahore Qalandars) made his T20 debut.

=== Final ===
Match 34
18 March 2023
19:00 (N)
Scorecard

(H) Lahore Qalandars; 200/6 (20 overs)	v	Multan Sultans; 199/8 (20 overs)
Abdullah Shafique 65 (40); Usama Mir 3/24 (3 overs)		Rilee Rossouw 52 (32); Shaheen Afridi 4/51 (4 overs)

Lahore Qalandars won by 1 run
Gaddafi Stadium, Lahore
Umpires: Alex Wharf (Eng) and Rashid Riaz (Pak)
Player of the match: Shaheen Afridi (Lahore Qalandars)

- Lahore Qalandars won the toss and elected to bat.

== Statistics ==
=== Most runs ===
Player	Innings	Runs	High score	50s	100s
Fakhar Zaman	13	429	115	2	1
Abdullah Shafique	10	268	75	2	0
Mirza Tahir Baig	10	244	54	1	0
Sam Billings	10	235	54	1	0
Sikandar Raza	11	223	71*	1	0

- Source: ESPNcricinfo

=== Most wickets ===
Player	Innings	Wickets	Best bowling
Rashid Khan	11	20	4/21
Shaheen Afridi	12	19	5/40
Haris Rauf	13	17	3/22
Zaman Khan	13	15	2/17
David Wiese	13	9	3/17

- Source: ESPNcricinfo
