= 2021 Quetta Gladiators season =

Overview of Quetta Gladiators in 2021

Quetta Gladiators
2021 season
- Coach: Moin Khan
- Captain: Sarfraz Ahmed
- PSL 2021: League stage (6th)
- Most runs: Sarfaraz Ahmed (321)
- Most wickets: Mohammad Hasnain (9)

The Quetta Gladiators is a franchise cricket team that represents Quetta in Pakistan Super League (PSL). It was one of the six teams that competed in the 2021 season. The team was coached by Moin Khan, and captained by Sarfaraz Ahmed, where Umar Gul was a bowling coach.

== Kit manufacturers and sponsors ==
Shirt sponsor (chest)	Shirt sponsor (back)	Chest branding	Sleeve branding
BRB Group	Lotte Choco Pie	BRB Group	KFC, Soneri Bank, Berocca

Playing kit

== Season standings ==
=== Points table ===
Pos	Team	Pld	W	L	NR	Pts	NRR
1	Islamabad United (3rd)	10	8	2	0	16	0.859
2	Multan Sultans (C)	10	5	5	0	10	1.050
3	Peshawar Zalmi (R)	10	5	5	0	10	0.586
4	Karachi Kings (4th)	10	5	5	0	10	−0.115
5	Lahore Qalandars	10	5	5	0	10	−0.589
6	Quetta Gladiators	10	2	8	0	4	−1.786

Source: ESPNcricinfo
- The top 4 teams qualified for the playoffs
- advanced to Qualifier
- advanced to Eliminator 1

== League fixtures ==
Match 1
20 February 2021
20:00 (N)
Scorecard

Quetta Gladiators; 121 (18.2 overs)	v	Karachi Kings; 126/3 (13.5 overs)
Chris Gayle 39 (24); Arshad Iqbal 3/16 (4 overs)		Joe Clarke 46 (23); Mohammad Hasnain 2/18 (4 overs)

Karachi Kings won by 7 wickets
National Stadium, Karachi
Umpires: Aleem Dar (Pak) and Ahsan Raza (Pak)
Player of the match: Arshad Iqbal (Karachi Kings)

- Karachi Kings won the toss and elected to field.

Match 4
22 February 2021
19:00 (N)
Scorecard

Quetta Gladiators; 178/6 (20 overs)	v	Lahore Qalandars; 179/1 (18.2 overs)
Chris Gayle 68 (40); Haris Rauf 3/38 (4 overs)		Fakhar Zaman 82* (52); Zahid Mahmood 1/28 (3 overs)

Lahore Qalandars won by 9 wickets
National Stadium, Karachi
Umpires: Aleem Dar (Pak) and Asif Yaqoob (Pak)
Player of the match: Fakhar Zaman (Lahore Qalandars)

- Lahore Qalandars won the toss and elected to field.

Match 8
26 February 2021
20:00 (N)
Scorecard

Quetta Gladiators; 198/7 (20 overs)	v	Peshawar Zalmi; 202/7 (19.3 overs)
Sarfaraz Ahmed 81 (40); Saqib Mahmood 3/34 (4 overs)		Haider Ali 50 (29); Dale Steyn 2/44 (4 overs)

Peshawar Zalmi won by 3 wickets
National Stadium, Karachi
Umpires: Richard Illingworth (Eng) and Asif Yaqoob (Pak)
Player of the match: Haider Ali (Peshawar Zalmi)

- Peshawar Zalmi won the toss and elected to field.

Match 12
1−2 March 2021
19:00 (N)
Scorecard

Quetta Gladiators; 156/7 (20 overs)	v	Islamabad United; 157/4 (17 overs)
Sarfaraz Ahmed 54 (41); Faheem Ashraf 3/11 (4 overs)		Paul Stirling 56 (33); Zahid Mahmood 2/29 (4 overs)

Islamabad United won by 6 wickets
National Stadium, Karachi
Umpires: Ahsan Raza (Pak) and Shozab Raza (Pak)
Player of the match: Faheem Ashraf (Islamabad United)

- Islamabad United won the toss and elected to field.
- The match was postponed for one day due to Fawad Ahmed testing Positive for COVID-19.

Match 14
3 March 2021
19:00 (N)
Scorecard

Quetta Gladiators; 176/7 (20 overs)	v	Multan Sultans; 154 (19.4 overs)
Usman Khan 81 (50); Shahnawaz Dahani 3/44 (4 overs)		Mohammad Rizwan 66 (50); Qais Ahmad 3/21 (4 overs)

Quetta Gladiators won by 22 runs
National Stadium, Karachi
Umpires: Faisal Afridi (Pak) and Asif Yaqoob (Pak)
Player of the match: Qais Ahmad (Quetta Gladiators)

- Multan Sultans won the toss and elected to field.

Match 18
11 June 2021
21:00 (N)
Scorecard

Quetta Gladiators; 133 (20 overs)	v	Islamabad United; 137/0 (10 overs)
Jake Weatherald 43 (35); Mohammad Wasim 2/12 (4 overs)		Colin Munro 90* (36)

Islamabad United won by 10 wickets
Sheikh Zayed Cricket Stadium, Abu Dhabi
Umpires: Aleem Dar (Pak) and Shozab Raza (Pak)
Player of the match: Colin Munro (Islamabad United)

- Islamabad United won the toss and elected to field.
- Naseem Shah replaced Andre Russell as a concussion substitute for Quetta Gladiators.

Match 19
12 June 2021
21:00 (N)
Scorecard

Peshawar Zalmi; 197/5 (20 overs)	v	Quetta Gladiators; 136/9 (20 overs)
David Miller 73 (46); Mohammad Nawaz 2/33 (4 overs)		Sarfaraz Ahmed 36* (28); Mohammad Irfan 3/27 (4 overs)

Peshawar Zalmi won by 61 runs
Sheikh Zayed Cricket Stadium, Abu Dhabi
Umpires: Ahsan Raza (Pak) and Shozab Raza (Pak)
Player of the match: David Miller (Peshawar Zalmi)

- Quetta Gladiators won the toss and elected to field.
- Saim Ayub replaced Faf du Plessis as a concussion substitute for Quetta Gladiators.

Match 23
15 June 2021
18:00 (D/N)
Scorecard

Quetta Gladiators; 158/5 (20 overs)	v	Lahore Qalandars; 140 (18 overs)
Jake Weatherald 48 (41); James Faulkner 3/25 (4 overs)		Tim David 46 (27); Khurram Shahzad 3/14 (3 overs)

Quetta Gladiators won by 18 runs
Sheikh Zayed Cricket Stadium, Abu Dhabi
Umpires: Aleem Dar (Pak) and Rashid Riaz (Pak)
Player of the match: Usman Shinwari (Quetta Gladiators)

- Lahore Qalandars won the toss and elected to field.

Match 25
16 June 2021
21:00 (N)
Scorecard

Multan Sultans; 183/5 (20 overs)	v	Quetta Gladiators; 73 (12.1 overs)
Shan Masood 73 (42); Khurram Shahzad 2/26 (4 overs)		Jake Weatherald 19 (10); Imran Tahir 3/7 (2 overs)

Multan Sultans won by 110 runs
Sheikh Zayed Cricket Stadium, Abu Dhabi
Umpires: Aleem Dar (Pak) and Shozab Raza (Pak)
Player of the match: Shan Masood (Multan Sultans)

- Quetta Gladiators won the toss and elected to field.
- As a result of this match, Quetta Gladiators were eliminated from the tournament.

Match 29
19 June 2021
18:00 (D/N)
Scorecard

Karachi Kings; 176/7 (20 overs)	v	Quetta Gladiators; 162/6 (20 overs)
Danish Aziz 45 (13); Arish Ali Khan 4/28 (4 overs)		Sarfaraz Ahmed 51* (33); Mohammad Ilyas 3/39 (4 overs)

Karachi Kings won by 14 runs
Sheikh Zayed Cricket Stadium, Abu Dhabi
Umpires: Shozab Raza (Pak) and Asif Yaqoob (Pak)
Player of the match: Danish Aziz (Karachi Kings)

- Karachi Kings won the toss and elected to bat.
