= 2023 Peshawar Zalmi season =

2023 season of Peshawar Zalmi

Peshawar Zalmi
2023 season
- Coach: Daren Sammy
- Captain: Babar Azam
- PSL 2023: Playoffs (3rd)
- Most runs: Babar Azam (522)
- Most wickets: Azmatullah Omarzai (10); Wahab Riaz (10)

Peshawar Zalmi is a franchise cricket team that represents Peshawar in the Pakistan Super League (PSL). They were one of the six teams that competed in the 2023 Pakistan Super League and placed third. The team was coached by Daren Sammy, and captained by Babar Azam.

== Squad ==
- Players with international caps are listed in **bold**.
- Ages are given as of 13 February 2023, the date of the first match in the tournament.

No.	Name	Nationality	Birth date	Batting style	Bowling style	Year signed	Notes
Batsmen
6	Saim Ayub	Pakistan	24 May 2002 (aged 20)	Left-handed	Right-arm medium fast	2023	
32	Tom Kohler-Cadmore	England	19 August 1994 (aged 28)	Right-handed	Right-arm off break	2021	
52	**Rovman Powell**	West Indies	23 July 1993 (aged 29)	Right-handed	Right-arm fast medium	2023	
54	**Bhanuka Rajapaksa**	Sri Lanka	24 October 1991 (aged 31)	Left-handed	Right-arm medium	2023	
56	**Babar Azam**	Pakistan	15 October 1994 (aged 28)	Right-handed	Right-arm off break	2023	Captain
	~~**Sherfane Rutherford**~~ (Note: Rutherford suffered an injury which ruled him out of the tournament.)	West Indies	15 August 1998 (aged 24)	Left-handed	Right-arm fast medium	2021	
All-rounders
9	**Dasun Shanaka**	Sri Lanka	9 September 1991 (aged 31)	Right-handed	Right-arm medium-fast	2023	Full replacement for Sherfane Rutherford
22	**Danish Aziz**	Pakistan	20 November 1995 (aged 27)	Left-handed	Left-arm orthodox spin	2023	
40	Saad Masood	Pakistan	11 December 2004 (aged 18)	Right-handed	Right-arm off break	2023	
50	**James Neesham**	New Zealand	17 September 1990 (aged 32)	Left-handed	Left-arm fast medium	2023	
65	**Aamer Jamal**	Pakistan	5 July 1996 (aged 26)	Right-handed	Right-arm fast	2023	
75	**Shakib Al Hasan**	Bangladesh	24 April 1987 (aged 35)	Left-handed	Left-arm orthodox spin	2023	
89	**Haris Sohail**	Pakistan	9 January 1989 (aged 34)	Left-handed	Left-arm orthodox	2023	
Wicket-keepers
13	Haseebullah Khan	Pakistan	20 March 2003 (aged 19)	Left-handed	—	2023	
29	**Mohammad Haris**	Pakistan	13 May 2001 (aged 21)	Right-handed	Right-arm off break	2022	
Bowlers
2	Peter Hatzoglou	Australia	10 August 1993 (aged 29)	Right-handedight-handed	Right-arm leg-break	2023	Partial replacement for Mujeeb Ur Rahman
7	**Mujeeb Ur Rahman**	Afghanistan	28 March 2001 (aged 21)	Right-handed	Right-arm off break	2023	
8	Khurram Shahzad	Pakistan	25 November 1999 (aged 23)	Right-handed	Right-arm medium	2023	
33	Richard Gleeson	England	2 December 1987 (aged 35)	Right-handed	Right-arm fast	2023	Partial replacement for Rovman Powell
35	**Arshad Iqbal**	Pakistan	26 December 2000 (aged 22)	Right-handed	Right-arm medium fast	2022	
47	**Wahab Riaz**	Pakistan	28 June 1985 (aged 37)	Right-handed	Left-arm fast	2016	
77	**Azmatullah Omarzai**	Afghanistan	24 March 2000 (aged 22)	Right-handed	Right-arm medium-fast	2023	Partial replacement for Shakib Al Hasan
82	Sufiyan Muqeem	Pakistan		Left-handed	Left-arm orthodox spin	2023	
91	**Usman Qadir**	Pakistan	10 August 1993 (aged 29)	Left-handed	Right-arm leg-break	2022	
99	Salman Irshad	Pakistan	3 December 1995 (aged 27)	Right-handed	Right-arm fast-medium	2022	

- Source: Cricinfo

== Management and coaching staff ==
Name	Position
Inzamam-ul-Haq	President
Daren Sammy	Head coach
Mohammad Akram	Director of cricket and bowling coach
Kamran Akmal	Batting mentor
James Foster	Fielding coach

== Kit manufacturers and sponsors ==
Kit manufacturer	Shirt sponsor (chest)	Shirt sponsor (back)	Chest branding	Sleeve branding
Gym Armour	Haier	TCL	Huawei	McDonald's Pakistan, Turkish Airlines, 100 Century Town

Home kit

Away kit

== Season standings ==
=== Points table ===
Pos	Team	Pld	W	L	NR	Pts	NRR
1	Lahore Qalandars (C)	10	7	3	0	14	0.915
2	Multan Sultans (R)	10	6	4	0	12	0.500
3	Islamabad United (4th)	10	6	4	0	12	−0.708
4	Peshawar Zalmi (3rd)	10	5	5	0	10	−0.452
5	Karachi Kings	10	3	7	0	6	0.756
6	Quetta Gladiators	10	3	7	0	6	−1.066

Source: ESPNcricinfo
- The top 4 teams qualified for the playoffs.
- Advances to Qualifier.
- Advances to Eliminator 1.

Notes:

- C = Champions;
- R = Runner-up;
- (x) = Position at the end of the tournament

== Group fixtures ==
Match 2
14 February 2023
20:00 (N)
Scorecard

Peshawar Zalmi; 199/5 (20 overs)	v	Karachi Kings (H); 197/5 (20 overs)
Tom Kohler-Cadmore 92 (50); Mir Hamza 1/13 (2 overs)		Imad Wasim 80* (47); James Neesham 2/26 (4 overs)

Peshawar Zalmi won by 2 runs
National Stadium, Karachi
Umpires: Ahsan Raza (Pak) and Alex Wharf (Eng)
Player of the match: Tom Kohler-Cadmore (Peshawar Zalmi)

- Karachi Kings won the toss and elected to field.
- Sufiyan Muqeem and Khurram Shahzad (Peshawar Zalmi) both made their T20 debuts.

Match 5
17 February 2023
18:00 (N)
Scorecard

(H) Multan Sultans; 210/3 (20 overs)	v	Peshawar Zalmi; 154 (18.5 overs)
Rilee Rossouw 75 (36); Salman Irshad 2/38 (4 overs)		Saim Ayub 53 (37); Usama Mir 3/22 (4 overs)

Multan Sultans won by 56 runs
Multan Cricket Stadium, Multan
Umpires: Faisal Afridi (Pak) and Asif Yaqoob (Pak)
Player of the match: Rilee Rossouw (Multan Sultans)

- Peshawar Zalmi won the toss and elected to field.

Match 9
20 February 2023
19:00 (N)
Scorecard

Quetta Gladiators; 154/4 (20 overs)	v	Peshawar Zalmi; 157/6 (18.3 overs)
Iftikhar Ahmed 50* (34); Usman Qadir 2/26 (4 overs)		James Neesham 38 (23); Mohammad Hasnain 3/13 (4 overs)

Peshawar Zalmi won by 4 wickets
National Stadium, Karachi
Umpires: Alex Wharf (Eng) and Ruchira Palliyaguruge (SL)
Player of the match: James Neesham (Peshawar Zalmi)

- Peshawar Zalmi won the toss and elected to field.

Match 12
23 February 2023
19:00 (N)
Scorecard

Peshawar Zalmi; 156/8 (20 overs)	v	Islamabad United; 159/4 (14.5 overs)
Babar Azam 75* (58); Hasan Ali 3/35 (4 overs)		Rahmanullah Gurbaz 62 (31); James Neesham 1/21 (2 overs)

Islamabad United won by 6 wickets
National Stadium, Karachi
Umpires: Michael Gough (Eng) and Richard Illingworth (Eng)
Player of the match: Hasan Ali (Islamabad United)

- Islamabad United won the toss and elected to field.

Match 15
26 February 2023
19:00 (N)
Scorecard

(H) Lahore Qalandars; 241/3 (20 overs)	v	Peshawar Zalmi; 201/9 (20 overs)
Fakhar Zaman 96 (45); Wahab Riaz 2/45 (4 overs)		Tom Kohler-Cadmore 55 (23); Shaheen Afridi 5/40 (4 overs)

Lahore Qalandars won by 40 runs
Gaddafi Stadium, Lahore
Umpires: Faisal Afridi (Pak) and Richard Illingworth (Eng)
Player of the match: Fakhar Zaman (Lahore Qalandars)

- Lahore Qalandars won the toss and elected to bat.
- Saad Masood (Peshawar Zalmi) made his T20 debut.

Match 17
1 March 2023
19:00 (N)
Scorecard

Peshawar Zalmi; 197/5 (20 overs)	v	Karachi Kings; 173/8 (20 overs)
Rovman Powell 64 (34); Mohammad Amir 4/26 (4 overs)		Imad Wasim 57* (30); Azmatullah Omarzai 3/28 (4 overs)

Peshawar Zalmi won by 24 runs
Rawalpindi Cricket Stadium, Rawalpindi
Umpires: Michael Gough (Eng) and Richard Illingworth (Eng)
Player of the match: Rovman Powell (Peshawar Zalmi)

- Karachi Kings won the toss and elected to field.

Match 23
7 March 2023
14:00
Scorecard

Peshawar Zalmi; 207 (19.3 overs)	v	Lahore Qalandars; 172 (19.4 overs)
Saim Ayub 68 (36); Shaheen Afridi 4/31 (4 overs)		Hussain Talat 63 (37); Wahab Riaz 3/17 (4 overs)

Peshawar Zalmi won by 35 runs
Rawalpindi Cricket Stadium, Rawalpindi
Umpires: Alex Wharf (Eng) and Asif Yaqoob (Pak)
Player of the match: Saim Ayub (Peshawar Zalmi)

- Peshawar Zalmi won the toss and elected to bat.
- Shawaiz Irfan (Lahore Qalandars) made his T20 debut.

Match 25
8 March 2023
19:00 (N)
Scorecard

Peshawar Zalmi; 240/2 (20 overs)	v	Quetta Gladiators; 243/2 (18.2 overs)
Babar Azam 115 (65); Dwaine Pretorius 1/40 (4 overs)		Jason Roy 145* (63); Mujeeb Ur Rahman 1/38 (4 overs)

Quetta Gladiators won by 8 wickets
Rawalpindi Cricket Stadium, Rawalpindi
Umpires: Ahsan Raza (Pak) and Martin Saggers (Eng)
Player of the match: Jason Roy (Quetta Gladiators)

- Peshawar Zalmi won the toss and elected to bat.
- This was the second highest run-chase in PSL history.

Match 27
10 March 2023
19:00 (N)
Scorecard

Peshawar Zalmi; 242/6 (20 overs)	v	Multan Sultans; 244/6 (19.1 overs)
Babar Azam 73 (39); Abbas Afridi 4/39 (4 overs)		Rilee Rossouw 121 (51); Azmatullah Omarzai 2/61 (4 overs)

Multan Sultans won by 4 wickets
Rawalpindi Cricket Stadium, Rawalpindi
Umpires: Ahsan Raza (Pak) and Martin Saggers (Eng)
Player of the match: Rilee Rossouw (Multan Sultans)

- Peshawar Zalmi won the toss and elected to bat.
- This was the highest run-chase in PSL history.
- As a result of this match, Multan Sultans qualified for the playoffs.

Match 29
12 March 2023
14:00
Scorecard

Peshawar Zalmi; 179/8 (20 overs)	v	Islamabad United (H); 166 (19.4 overs)
Mohammad Haris 79 (39); Hasan Ali 3/39 (4 overs)		Faheem Ashraf 38 (13); Khurram Shahzad 3/13 (1.4 overs)

Peshawar Zalmi won by 13 runs
Rawalpindi Cricket Stadium, Rawalpindi
Umpires: Ahsan Raza (Pak) and Martin Saggers (Eng)
Player of the match: Mohammad Haris (Peshawar Zalmi)

- Islamabad United won the toss and elected to field.

== Playoffs ==
=== Eliminator 1 ===
Match 32
16 March 2023
19:00 (N)
Scorecard

Peshawar Zalmi; 183/8 (20 overs)	v	Islamabad United; 171/6 (20 overs)
Babar Azam 64 (39); Shadab Khan 2/40 (4 overs)		Sohaib Maqsood 60 (48); Salman Irshad 2/18 (4 overs)

Peshawar Zalmi won by 12 runs
Gaddafi Stadium, Lahore
Umpires: Faisal Afridi (Pak) and Ahsan Raza (Pak)
Player of the match: Aamer Jamal (Peshawar Zalmi)

- Islamabad United won the toss and elected to field.

=== Eliminator 2 ===
Match 33
17 March 2023
19:00 (N)
Scorecard

Peshawar Zalmi; 171/5 (20 overs)	v	Lahore Qalandars (H); 176/6 (18.5 overs)
Mohammad Haris 85 (54); Zaman Khan 2/20 (3 overs)		Mirza Tahir Baig 54 (42); Azmatullah Omarzai 2/30 (4 overs)

Lahore Qalandars won by 4 wickets
Gaddafi Stadium, Lahore
Umpires: Ahsan Raza (Pak) and Martin Saggers (Eng)
Player of the match: Mirza Tahir Baig (Lahore Qalandars)

- Peshawar Zalmi won the toss and elected to bat.
- Ahsan Hafeez (Lahore Qalandars) made his T20 debut.

== Statistics ==
=== Most runs ===
Player	Innings	Runs	High score	50s	100s
Babar Azam	11	522	115	5	1
Mohammad Haris	11	350	85	2	0
Saim Ayub	12	341	74	5	0
Tom Kohler-Cadmore	12	325	92	3	0
Rovman Powell	8	189	64	1	0

- Source: ESPNcricinfo

=== Most wickets ===
Player	Innings	Wickets	Best bowling
Azmatullah Omarzai	6	10	3/28
Wahab Riaz	11	10	3/17
Aamer Jamal	6	9	3/43
James Neesham	7	6	2/23
Salman Irshad	6	6	2/18

- Source: ESPNcricinfo
