= 2020 Peshawar Zalmi season =

Peshawar based Pakistani franchise cricket team

Peshawar Zalmi
2020 season
- Coach: Daren Sammy
- Captain: Wahab Riaz
- PSL 2020: 4th
- Tournament performance: Eliminator
- Most runs: Shoaib Malik (278)
- Most wickets: Wahab Riaz (11)

The Peshawar Zalmi is a franchise cricket team that competed in the Pakistan Super League. The team is based in Peshawar, Khyber Pakhtunkhwa, Pakistan. They were one of the six teams that competed in the 2020 season and placed fourth after winning four of their 10 matches. The team was coached by Daren Sammy and captained by Wahab Riaz.

== Management and coaching staff ==
Position	Name
President	Inzamam-ul-Haq
Head coach	Daren Sammy
Team director	Mohammad Akram
Batting mentor	Hashim Amla

== Kit manufacturers and sponsors ==
Kit manufacturer	Shirt sponsor (chest)	Shirt sponsor (back)	Chest branding	Sleeve branding
Zalmi in-house	Haier	TCL	Huawei	McDonald's Pakistan, Oppo, Airlink

Playing kit

Away kit

== Season standings ==
=== Ladder ===
Pos	Team	Pld	W	L	NR	Pts	NRR
1	Multan Sultans (3rd)	10	6	2	2	14	1.031
2	Karachi Kings (C)	10	5	4	1	11	−0.190
3	Lahore Qalandars (R)	10	5	5	0	10	−0.072
4	Peshawar Zalmi (4th)	10	4	5	1	9	−0.055
5	Quetta Gladiators	10	4	5	1	9	−0.722
6	Islamabad United	10	3	6	1	7	0.185

Source: ESPNcricinfo
- The top four teams qualified for the playoffs
- Advanced to Qualifier
- Advanced to Eliminator 1

== League matches ==
Match 2
21 February 2020
15:00
Scorecard

Karachi Kings; 201/4 (20 overs)	v	Peshawar Zalmi; 191/7 (20 overs)
Babar Azam 78 (56); Hasan Ali 2/52 (4 overs)		Liam Livingstone 54* (29); Umaid Asif 2/23 (4 overs)

Karachi Kings won by 10 runs
National Stadium, Karachi
Umpires: Faisal Afridi (Pak) and Richard Illingworth (Eng)
Player of the match: Babar Azam (Karachi Kings)

- Peshawar Zalmi won the toss and elected to field.

Match 4
22 February 2020
14:00
Scorecard

Quetta Gladiators; 148/5 (20 overs)	v	Peshawar Zalmi; 153/4 (18.3 overs)
Jason Roy 73* (57); Wahab Riaz 2/21 (4 overs)		Kamran Akmal 101 (55); Fawad Ahmed 2/40 (3.3 overs)

Peshawar Zalmi won by 6 wickets
National Stadium, Karachi
Umpires: Faisal Afridi (Pak) and Richard Illingworth (Eng)
Player of the match: Kamran Akmal (Peshawar Zalmi)

- Peshawar Zalmi won the toss and elected to field.
- Mohammad Amir Khan (Peshawar Zalmi) made his T20 debut.

Match 8
26 February 2020
19:00 (D/N)
Scorecard

Peshawar Zalmi; 123 (18.3 overs)	v	Multan Sultans; 124/4 (14.5 overs)
Haider Ali 47 (27); Sohail Tanvir 4/13 (3.3 overs)		Rilee Rossouw 49* (42); Wahab Riaz 2/36 (3.5 overs)

Multan Sultans won by 6 wickets
Multan Cricket Stadium, Multan
Umpires: Faisal Afridi (Pak) and Asif Yaqoob (Pak)
Player of the match: Sohail Tanvir (Multan Sultans)

- Multan Sultans won the toss and elected to field.

Match 11
28 February 2020
20:00 (D/N)
Scorecard

Peshawar Zalmi; 132/7 (12 overs)	v	Lahore Qalandars; 116/6 (12 overs)
Haider Ali 34 (12); Dilbar Hussain 4/24 (3 overs)		Samit Patel 34* (15); Lewis Gregory 4/25 (3 overs)

Peshawar Zalmi won by 16 runs
Rawalpindi Cricket Stadium, Rawalpindi
Umpires: Ranmore Martinesz (SL) and Tariq Rasheed (Pak)
Player of the match: Lewis Gregory (Peshawar Zalmi)

- Lahore Qalandars won the toss and elected to field.
- The match was reduced to 12 overs per side due to rain.

Match 13
29 February 2020
19:00 (D/N)
Scorecard

Islamabad United	v	Peshawar Zalmi

Match abandoned
Rawalpindi Cricket Stadium, Rawalpindi
Umpires: Ranmore Martinesz (SL) and Tariq Rasheed (Pak)

- No toss.
- No play was possible due to rain.

Match 15
2 March 2020
19:00 (D/N)
Scorecard

Peshawar Zalmi; 151/8 (20 overs)	v	Karachi Kings; 152/4 (18.1 overs)
Shoaib Malik 68 (55); Mohammad Amir 4/25 (4 overs)		Babar Azam 70* (59); Yasir Shah 2/28 (4 overs)

Karachi Kings won by 6 wickets
Rawalpindi Cricket Stadium, Rawalpindi
Umpires: Ranmore Martinesz (SL) and Tariq Rasheed (Pak)
Player of the match: Mohammad Amir (Karachi Kings)

- Karachi Kings won the toss and elected to field.

Match 18
5 March 2020
19:00 (D/N)
Scorecard

Peshawar Zalmi; 170/6 (15 overs)	v	Quetta Gladiators; 140/7 (15 overs)
Shoaib Malik 54 (27); Mohammad Hasnain 4/34 (3 overs)		Jason Roy 45 (26); Wahab Riaz 3/21 (3 overs)

Peshawar Zalmi won by 30 runs
Rawalpindi Cricket Stadium, Rawalpindi
Umpires: Ranmore Martinesz (SL) and Tariq Rasheed (Pak)
Player of the match: Shoaib Malik (Peshawar Zalmi)

- Quetta Gladiators won the toss and elected to bat
- The match was reduced to 15 overs per side due to rain.

Match 20
7 March 2020
14:00
Scorecard

Islamabad United; 195/5 (20 overs)	v	Peshawar Zalmi; 85/2 (9 overs)
Shadab Khan 77 (42); Hasan Ali 2/36 (4 overs)		Kamran Akmal 37 (21); Zafar Gohar 1/11 (2 overs)

Peshawar Zalmi won by 7 runs (DLS method)
Rawalpindi Cricket Stadium, Rawalpindi
Umpires: Tariq Rasheed (Pak) and Rashid Riaz (Pak)
Player of the match: Shadab Khan (Islamabad United)

- Peshawar Zalmi won the toss and elected to field.

Match 24
10 March 2020
19:00 (D/N)
Scorecard

Peshawar Zalmi; 187/7 (20 overs)	v	Lahore Qalandars; 189/5 (19.5 overs)
Haider Ali 69 (43); Shaheen Afridi 3/28 (4 overs)		Fakhar Zaman 63 (46); Carlos Brathwaite 3/28 (2.5 overs)

Lahore Qalandars won by 5 wickets
Gaddafi Stadium, Lahore
Umpires: Aleem Dar (Pak) and Michael Gough (Eng)
Player of the match: Fakhar Zaman (Lahore Qalandars)

- Lahore Qalandars won the toss and elected to field.

Match 27
13 March 2020
20:00 (D/N)
Scorecard

Multan Sultans; 154/6 (20 overs)	v	Peshawar Zalmi; 151/7 (20 overs)
Zeeshan Ashraf 52 (39); Rahat Ali 3/24 (4 overs)		Imam-ul-Haq 56 (41); Sohail Tanvir 3/26 (4 overs)

Multan Sultans won by 3 runs
National Stadium, Karachi
Umpires: Michael Gough (Eng) and Rashid Riaz (Pak)
Player of the match: Zeeshan Ashraf (Multan Sultans)

- Peshawar Zalmi won the toss and elected to field.

== Playoffs ==
=== Eliminator 1 ===
Match 32
14 November 2020
20:00 (D/N)
Scorecard

Peshawar Zalmi; 170/9 (20 overs)	v	Lahore Qalandars; 171/5 (19 overs)
Shoaib Malik 39 (24); Dilbar Hussain 3/33 (4 overs)		Mohammad Hafeez 74* (46); Saqib Mahmood 3/41 (4 overs)

Lahore Qalandars won by 5 wickets
National Stadium, Karachi
Umpires: Aleem Dar (Pak) and Shozab Raza (Pak)
Player of the match: Mohammad Hafeez (Lahore Qalandars)

- Lahore Qalandars won the toss and elected to field.
