= 2021 Lahore Qalandars season =

Overview of Lahore Qalandars in 2021

Lahore Qalandars
2021 season
- Coach: Aaqib Javed
- Captain: Sohail Akhtar
- PSL 2021: League stage (5th)

The Lahore Qalandars (often abbreviated as LQ) is a franchise cricket team based in Lahore, Punjab in the Pakistan Super League (PSL) that competed in 2020 Pakistan Super League. They are one of the six team that competed in Pakistan Super League. The team was coached by Aaqib Javed and captained by Sohail Akhtar.

== Kit manufacturers and sponsors ==
Kit manufacturer	Shirt sponsor (chest)	Shirt sponsor (back)	Chest branding	Sleeve branding
Millat Sports	B4U Cabs	Bravo Super Market	Geo News	Mughal Steel, Revolt

Playing kit

== Season standings ==
=== Points table ===
Pos	Team	Pld	W	L	NR	Pts	NRR
1	Islamabad United (3rd)	10	8	2	0	16	0.859
2	Multan Sultans (C)	10	5	5	0	10	1.050
3	Peshawar Zalmi (R)	10	5	5	0	10	0.586
4	Karachi Kings (4th)	10	5	5	0	10	−0.115
5	Lahore Qalandars	10	5	5	0	10	−0.589
6	Quetta Gladiators	10	2	8	0	4	−1.786

Source: ESPNcricinfo
- The top 4 teams qualified for the playoffs
- advanced to Qualifier
- advanced to Eliminator 1

== League stage ==
Match 2
21 February 2021
14:00 (D/N)
Scorecard

Peshawar Zalmi; 140/6 (20 overs)	v	Lahore Qalandars; 143/6 (18.3 overs)
Ravi Bopara 50 (44); Shaheen Afridi 3/14 (4 overs)		Mohammad Hafeez 33* (26); Saqib Mahmood 2/22 (4 overs)

Lahore Qalandars won by 4 wickets
National Stadium, Karachi
Umpires: Shozab Raza (Pak) and Rashid Riaz (Pak)
Player of the match: Shaheen Afridi (Lahore Qalandars)

- Lahore Qalandars won the toss and elected to field.

Match 4
22 February 2021
19:00 (N)
Scorecard

Quetta Gladiators; 178/6 (20 overs)	v	Lahore Qalandars; 179/1 (18.2 overs)
Chris Gayle 68 (40); Haris Rauf 3/38 (4 overs)		Fakhar Zaman 82* (52); Zahid Mahmood 1/28 (3 overs)

Lahore Qalandars won by 9 wickets
National Stadium, Karachi
Umpires: Aleem Dar (Pak) and Asif Yaqoob (Pak)
Player of the match: Fakhar Zaman (Lahore Qalandars)

- Lahore Qalandars won the toss and elected to field.

Match 7
26 February 2021
15:00 (D/N)
Scorecard

Lahore Qalandars; 157/6 (20 overs)	v	Multan Sultans; 159/3 (16.2 overs)
Mohammad Hafeez 60 (35); Carlos Brathwaite 2/20 (4 overs)		Mohammad Rizwan 76 (49); Shaheen Afridi 2/29 (4 overs)

Multan Sultans won by 7 wickets
National Stadium, Karachi
Umpires: Faisal Afridi (Pak) and Aleem Dar (Pak)
Player of the match: Mohammad Rizwan (Multan Sultans)

- Multan Sultans won the toss and elected to field.

Match 11
28 February 2021
19:00 (N)
Scorecard

Karachi Kings; 186/9 (20 overs)	v	Lahore Qalandars; 189/4 (19.2 overs)
Sharjeel Khan 64 (39); Shaheen Afridi 3/27 (4 overs)		Fakhar Zaman 83 (54); Waqas Maqsood 1/34 (3 overs)

Lahore Qalandars won by 6 wickets
National Stadium, Karachi
Umpires: Richard Illingworth (Eng) and Ahsan Raza (Pak)
Player of the match: Shaheen Afridi (Lahore Qalandars)

- Lahore Qalandars won the toss and elected to field.

Match 15
9 June 2021
21:00 (N)
Scorecard

Islamabad United; 143/9 (20 overs)	v	Lahore Qalandars; 144/5 (20 overs)
Faheem Ashraf 27 (24); James Faulkner 3/32 (4 overs)		Sohail Akhtar 40 (30); Hasan Ali 2/27 (4 overs)

Lahore Qalandars won by 5 wickets
Sheikh Zayed Cricket Stadium, Abu Dhabi
Umpires: Aleem Dar (Pak) and Rashid Riaz (Pak)
Player of the match: Rashid Khan (Lahore Qalandars)

- Lahore Qalandars won the toss and elected to field.

Match 17
10 June 2021
23:00 (N)
Scorecard

Lahore Qalandars; 170/8 (20 overs)	v	Peshawar Zalmi; 160/8 (20 overs)
Tim David 64* (36); Fabian Allen 2/36 (3 overs)		Shoaib Malik 73 (48); Rashid Khan 5/20 (4 overs)

Lahore Qalandars won by 10 runs
Sheikh Zayed Cricket Stadium, Abu Dhabi
Umpires: Rashid Riaz (Pak) and Asif Yaqoob (Pak)
Player of the match: Rashid Khan (Lahore Qalandars)

- Peshawar Zalmi won the toss and elected to field.

Match 20
13 June 2021
18:00 (D/N)
Scorecard

Islamabad United; 152/7 (20 overs)	v	Lahore Qalandars; 124 (18.2 overs)
Asif Ali 75 (43); James Faulkner 3/19 (4 overs)		Fakhar Zaman 44 (37); Muhammad Musa 3/18 (3 overs)

Islamabad United won by 28 runs
Sheikh Zayed Cricket Stadium, Abu Dhabi
Umpires: Shozab Raza (Pak) and Asif Yaqoob (Pak)
Player of the match: Asif Ali (Islamabad United)

- Islamabad United won the toss and elected to bat.

Match 23
15 June 2021
18:00 (D/N)
Scorecard

Quetta Gladiators; 158/5 (20 overs)	v	Lahore Qalandars; 140 (18 overs)
Jake Weatherald 48 (41); James Faulkner 3/25 (4 overs)		Tim David 46 (27); Khurram Shahzad 3/14 (3 overs)

Quetta Gladiators won by 18 runs
Sheikh Zayed Cricket Stadium, Abu Dhabi
Umpires: Aleem Dar (Pak) and Rashid Riaz (Pak)
Player of the match: Usman Shinwari (Quetta Gladiators)

- Lahore Qalandars won the toss and elected to field.

Match 27
17 June 2021
23:00 (N)
Scorecard

Karachi Kings; 176/5 (20 overs)	v	Lahore Qalandars; 169/7 (20 overs)
Babar Azam 54 (44); Rashid Khan 2/25 (4 overs)		Mohammad Hafeez 36 (36); Noor Ahmad 2/19 (4 overs)

Karachi Kings won by 7 runs
Sheikh Zayed Cricket Stadium, Abu Dhabi
Umpires: Ahsan Raza (Pak) and Asif Yaqoob (Pak)
Player of the match: Noor Ahmad (Karachi Kings)

- Karachi Kings won the toss and elected to bat.

Match 28
18 June 2021
21:00 (N)
Scorecard

Multan Sultans; 169/8 (20 overs)	v	Lahore Qalandars; 89 (15.1 overs)
Sohaib Maqsood 60 (40); Shaheen Afridi 3/23 (4 overs)		James Faulkner 22 (11); Shahnawaz Dahani 4/5 (3.1 overs)

Multan Sultans won by 80 runs
Sheikh Zayed Cricket Stadium, Abu Dhabi
Umpires: Aleem Dar (Pak) and Shozab Raza (Pak)
Player of the match: Shahnawaz Dahani (Multan Sultans)

- Lahore Qalandars won the toss and elected to field.
