= Moin Khan =

Pakistani cricketer

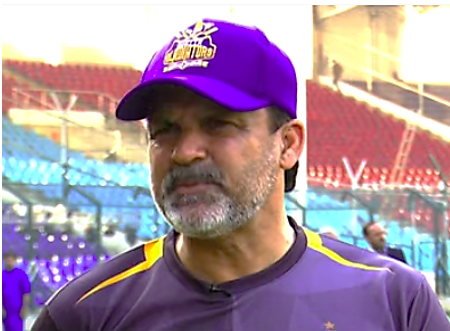
- Moin Khan in 2020

Personal information
- Full name: Muhammad Moin Khan
- Born: 23 September 1971 (age 55); Rawalpindi, Punjab, Pakistan
- Height: 5 ft 8 in (173 cm)
- Batting: Right-handed
- Bowling: Right arm off-break
- Role: Wicket-keeper
- Relatives: Nadeem Khan (brother); Azam Khan (son)

International information
- National side: Pakistan (1990–2004)
- Test debut (cap 119): 23 November 1990 v West Indies
- Last Test: 20 October 2004 v Sri Lanka
- ODI debut (cap 79): 10 November 1990 v West Indies
- Last ODI: 16 October 2004 v Sri Lanka
- ODI shirt no.: 5

Career statistics
| Competition | Test | ODI |
|---|---|---|
| Matches | 69 | 219 |
| Runs scored | 2,741 | 3,266 |
| Batting average | 28.55 | 23.00 |
| 100s/50s | 4/15 | 0/12 |
| Top score | 137 | 72* |
| Catches/stumpings | 128/20 | 214/73 |
Medal record
Men's Cricket
Representing Pakistan
ICC Cricket World Cup
| Winner | 1992 Australia and New Zealand |
| Runner-up | 1999 England-Wales -Ireland-Scotland-Netherlands |
- Source: ESPNcricinfo, 7 August 2005

Muhammad Moin Khan (Urdu: محمد معین خان; born 23 September 1971) is a Pakistani cricket administrator, coach, and former cricketer, primarily a wicket-keeper-batsman, who remained a member of the Pakistani national cricket team from 1990 to 2004. He was a part of the Pakistani squad which won the 1992 Cricket World Cup. He has also captained the Pakistani team, and led the team to be the champions of the 2000 Asia Cup.

He made his international debut against the West Indies at Multan.He took over 100 catches in Test cricket, has scored over 3,000 ODI runs, and has taken over 200 catches in ODI cricket.

He is credited with coining the name of Saqlain Mushtaq's mystery delivery that goes from leg to off, as the doosra. It means the "other one" in Urdu.

== Personal life ==
Khan's elder son Owais married television actress Mariam Ansari in February 2021.

His younger son Azam Khan made his T20I debut for Pakistan against England in July 2021 and plays for Islamabad United in the PSL.

== Cricket career ==
=== International career ===
Throughout his international career, Moin had to compete with another wicket-keeper, Rashid Latif. Moin kept wickets in the 1992 Cricket World Cup which Pakistan won and the 1999 Cricket World Cup where Pakistan finished runners-up. Latif kept wickets in the 1996 Cricket World Cup and the 2003 Cricket World Cup.

During the 1992 Cricket World Cup Semi-final against New Zealand, Pakistan needed 9 runs for 8 balls before Khan hit a six to make it 3 runs off 7 balls and then hit a boundary to help Pakistan set up a clash in the World Cup final with England. In the World Cup final, Pakistan was 249 from 50 overs with Khan not getting a chance to bat. However, he took three catches in the match including one of Ian Botham, who went for a duck against an inswinger bowled by Wasim Akram.

=== Domestic career ===
In 2005, Moin scored the first century in Pakistan domestic Twenty20 cricket when he smashed 112 off 59 balls for Karachi Dolphins against Lahore Lions in the ABN-AMRO Twenty-20 Cup. At the end of the season, he retired from cricket finishing with 200 not out against Hyderabad, his highest first-class score.

In 2007, Moin signed with the unofficial Indian Cricket League and coached the Hyderabad Heroes. In the 2008 edition of the competition, he coached the expansion side, the Lahore Badshahs.

== Post-retirement ==
=== Cricket administration ===
Moin Khan runs his own academy situated in Karachi, a city where he has relocated for many years, named DHA Sports Club Moin Khan Academy, that provides facilities not only for cricket but also for other sports such as football, squash, and swimming.

In July 2013, he replaced Iqbal Qasim as the chief selector of the Pakistan cricket team. But in 2015, during the Cricket World Cup 2015, he was removed from the position after the team's poor performance during the World Cup.

In August 2013, he was appointed the manager of the team.

=== Coaching career ===
In February 2014, he was appointed as the new head coach of the national team, replacing Dav Whatmore.

Since 2016, he has been serving as the head coach of the PSL franchise Quetta Gladiators.

== Controversies ==
=== Domestic violence ===
In January 2007, Moin Khan was freed on bail after a short detention following his wife Tasneem Khan's complaint to a local police helpline that she was beaten up.

=== Casino visit ===
In February 2015, Moin Khan, who was the chief selector of Pakistan team, went under investigation for allegedly visiting a casino before Pakistan team's heavy loss to West Indies in World Cup 2015. Moin Khan later apologized for his actions but reiterated that he just went to the casino to have dinner. In March 2015, PCB accepted Moin Khan's casino explanation and said that there will be no action taken against him.

== Television ==
| Year | Show | Channel | Note |
|---|---|---|---|
| 2022 | Jeeto Pakistan League | ARY Digital | Game show, special guest for the season 3 on 13 April 2022 |

| Preceded by Wasim Akram | Pakistan Cricket Captains; 2000–2001 | Succeeded by Waqar Younis |
