= No Objection Certificate =

Type of legal certificate predominantly used in countries in the Indian subcontinent

No Objection Certificate, popularly abbreviated as NOC, is a type of legal certificate issued by any agency, organisation, institute or, in certain cases, an individual. It does not object to the covenants of the certificate.

== Examples ==
=== Travel purpose ===
All Indian nationals, who are staying / working in Nepal require a NOC before flying to any third country for the first time from Nepal. The requirement for providing the NOC by the Consular Wing of the Embassy is as under:

1. The applicant should come personally to the embassy with the original passport, original Indian registration certificate, along with photocopy copies of the same;
2. Copy of the ticket and valid visa;
3. Two passport size photographs;
4. NPR 2590/- as consular fees for issuing the NOC.

Embassy provides the NOC to only those Indians who are staying / working in Nepal and are Registered as Indian nationals with the Embassy, if they should approach the embassy one or two days prior to their departure for the third country.
