= Khurram Shahzad (Pakistani cricketer, born 1993) =

Pakistani cricketer (born 1993)

Personal information
- Born: 25 September 1993 (age 33); Karachi, Sindh, Pakistan
- Batting: Right-handed
- Bowling: Right-arm medium-fast
- Role: Bowler

Domestic team information
- Years: Team
- 2023: Peshawar Zalmi
- Source: Cricinfo, 29 December 2023

Khurram Shahzad (born 25 September 1993) is a Pakistani cricketer who plays as a right-arm medium-fast bowler. In March 2019, he was named in Federal Areas' squad for the 2019 Pakistan Cup.
