= Azam Khan (cricketer, born 1998) =

Pakistani cricketer

Personal information
- Born: 10 August 1998 (age 28); Karachi, Sindh, Pakistan
- Height: 5 ft 8 in (173 cm)
- Batting: Right-handed
- Role: Wicket-keeper
- Relatives: Moin Khan (father); Nadeem Khan (uncle); Mariam Ansari (sister-in-law)

International information
- National side: Pakistan (2021–2024)
- T20I debut (cap 93): 16 July 2021 v England
- Last T20I: 6 June 2024 v USA
- T20I shirt no.: 77

Domestic team information
- Years: Team
- 2018-2021: Quetta Gladiators (squad no. 45)
- 2018: Pakistan Television
- 2020: Sindh
- 2020: Galle Gladiators (squad no. 23)
- 2021: Barbados Royals (squad no. 23)
- 2021/22-2023: Southern Punjab
- 2022–2025: Islamabad United
- 2023: Khulna Tigers
- 2026–Present: Karachi Kings

Career statistics
Competition	T20I	FC	LA	T20
Matches	14	16	30	184
Runs scored	88	739	590	3420
Batting average	9.78	28.42	29.50	23.42
100s/50s	0/0	1/4	0/2	1/16
Top score	30*	103	83	109*
Catches/stumpings	4/0	34/2	29/6	81/19
- Source: Cricinfo, 12 April 2025

Azam Khan (Sindhi and Urdu: اعظم خان; born 10 August 1998) is a Pakistani international cricketer who plays domestically for Karachi Kings and Sindh. He is the son of former Pakistan wicket-keeper Moin Khan.

Known as a power-hitter, he considers West Indies player Chris Gayle to be his batting role-model.

== Early and personal life ==
Khan is the son of former Pakistan cricket captain & wicketkeeper Moin Khan. His brother Owais Khan is married to actress Mariam Ansari.

Often criticized for his fitness standards, before the beginning of the PSL 2020 he trained with Shehzar Mohammad for some four months, losing 14kg in the process.

He's a fan of MMA, which he credits for the way he now handles fast-bowling, as previously he was perceived to be unable to play genuine pace.

He sings and plays the guitar, having learned it by himself through YouTube as a way to de-stress before matches, and has covered well-known songs, including a Bollywood title and Atif Aslam's Aadat.

== Domestic career ==
In September 2018, he made his List A debut for Pakistan Television in the 2018–19 Quaid-e-Azam One Day Cup.

In March 2019, he made his Twenty20 debut for the Quetta Gladiators in the 2019 Pakistan Super League.

In October 2020, he was drafted by the Galle Gladiators for the inaugural edition of the Lanka Premier League.

In December 2020, he made his first-class debut for Sindh in the 2020–21 Quaid-e-Azam Trophy.

In 2021, he was named in the Barbados Royals' squad for the 2021 Caribbean Premier League.

In December 2021, he was signed by Islamabad United following the players' draft for the 2022 Pakistan Super League.

In July 2022, he was signed by the Galle Gladiators for the third edition of the Lanka Premier League.

In November 2022, he was signed by the Khulna Tigers, to play for them in the 2022–23 Bangladesh Premier League. In the sixth match of the league, he hit his maiden century in T20 cricket, scoring an unbeaten 109 runs off 58 balls.

In July 2026, he was drafted by Mississauga Masters for the 2026 Canada Super 60 season.

== International career ==
In June 2021, Khan was named in Pakistan's Twenty20 International (T20I) squads for their tour of England and the West Indies. He made his T20I debut, which would also be his international debut, for Pakistan during that tour, playing against England.

In September 2021, he was named in Pakistan's squad for the 2021 ICC Men's T20 World Cup. However, the following month, he was replaced in the squad by Sarfaraz Ahmed.

In May 2024, he was selected in Pakistan's squad for Ireland. In the 2nd T20I, He scored 30 runs off 10 balls.

In the same month, he was selected in Pakistan's squad for 2024 ICC Men's T20 World Cup tournament. In the same month he was selected in Pakistan's T20 tour to England. He scored 11 runs in the second T20 match, before getting a duck in the fourth. In the 2024 ICC Men's T20 World Cup, he got a golden duck against the USA, the same match where Pakistan lost to USA on a super over, leading to criticism.

== Television ==
Year	Show	Note
2022	Jeeto Pakistan League	Game show, special guest for the season 3 on 12 April 2022
2022-2023	The Ultimate Muqabla	Adventure-action reality show
