= Haider Ali (cricketer, born 2000) =

Pakistani cricketer

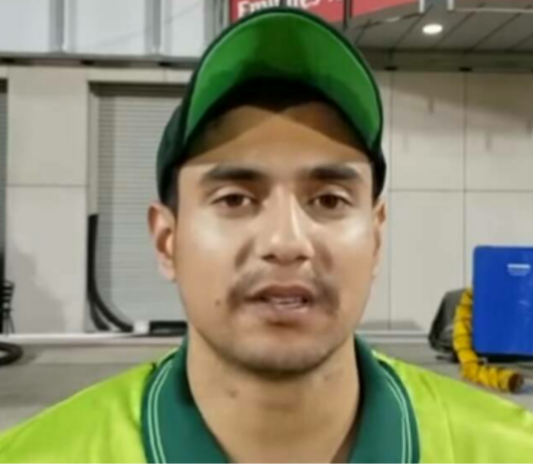

Personal information
- Full name: Malik Haidar Ali Khan
- Born: 2 October 2000 (age 26); Attock, Punjab, Pakistan
- Height: 6 ft (183 cm)
- Batting: Right-handed
- Role: Batter

International information
- National side: Pakistan (2020–2022)
- ODI debut (cap 226): 1 November 2020 v Zimbabwe
- Last ODI: 3 November 2020 v Zimbabwe
- T20I debut (cap 87): 1 September 2020 v England
- Last T20I: 6 October 2023 v Afghanistan

Domestic team information
- Years: Team
- 2019–2023: Northern
- 2020–2022: Peshawar Zalmi (squad no. 12)
- 2023: Karachi Kings (squad no. 46)
- 2023: Derbyshire (squad no. 12)
- 2024–present: Islamabad United (squad no. 46)
- 2025–present: Noakhali Express

Career statistics
| Competition | ODI | T20I | FC | LA |
|---|---|---|---|---|
| Matches | 2 | 35 | 27 | 55 |
| Runs scored | 42 | 505 | 1,797 | 1,855 |
| Batting average | 21.00 | 17.41 | 47.28 | 36.37 |
| 100s/50s | 0/0 | 0/3 | 5/8 | 2/15 |
| Top score | 29 | 68 | 206 | 118 |
| Catches/stumpings | 1/— | 8/— | 15/— | 19/— |
Medal record
Men's Cricket
Representing Pakistan
Asia Cup
| Runner-up | 2022 UAE |
T20 World Cup
| Runner-up | 2022 Australia |
Asian Games
| Silver medal – second place | 2026 Aichi–Nagoya |
- Source: Cricinfo, 29 March 2025

Haider Ali (Urdu, Punjabi: حیدر علی; born 2 October 2000) is a Pakistani right handed cricketer.

He made his first-class debut in September 2019. He made his international debut for the Pakistan cricket team on 1 September 2020.

Due to his batting style, his compact defence technique, his off-side play and his pull shots, he has been compared to Indian cricketer Rohit Sharma. He himself considers Sharma to be his role model.

== Early career ==
He was born in Attock, Punjab to a zamindar father. His Punjabi Awan family is known for being more into tent-pegging and horse-riding than cricket, and apart from a cousin who played for Rawalpindi Rams, he's the only one to have played professional cricket, beginning with tape-ball cricket in 2015 and joining the Al Faisal cricket club few months later, before playing at Under-16 level in 2016 and at Under-19 level in 2017.

== Domestic and franchise career ==
He made his Twenty20 debut for Rawalpindi in the 2018–19 National T20 Cup on 10 December 2018. In September 2019, he was named in Northern's squad for the 2019–20 Quaid-e-Azam Trophy tournament. He made his first-class debut for Northern in the 2019–20 Quaid-e-Azam Trophy on 14 September 2019.

In December 2019, he was drafted by the Pakistan Super League (PSL) franchise team Peshawar Zalmi as their Supplementary category Player during the 2020 PSL draft. On 10 March 2020, he became the youngest cricketer to score a fifty in the PSL.

In August 2021, he was named in the Jamaica Tallawahs' squad for the 2021 Caribbean Premier League. In December 2021, in the seventh round of the 2021–22 Quaid-e-Azam Trophy, he scored his maiden double century in first-class cricket with 206 runs.

In July 2022, he was signed by the Dambulla Giants for the third edition of the Lanka Premier League.

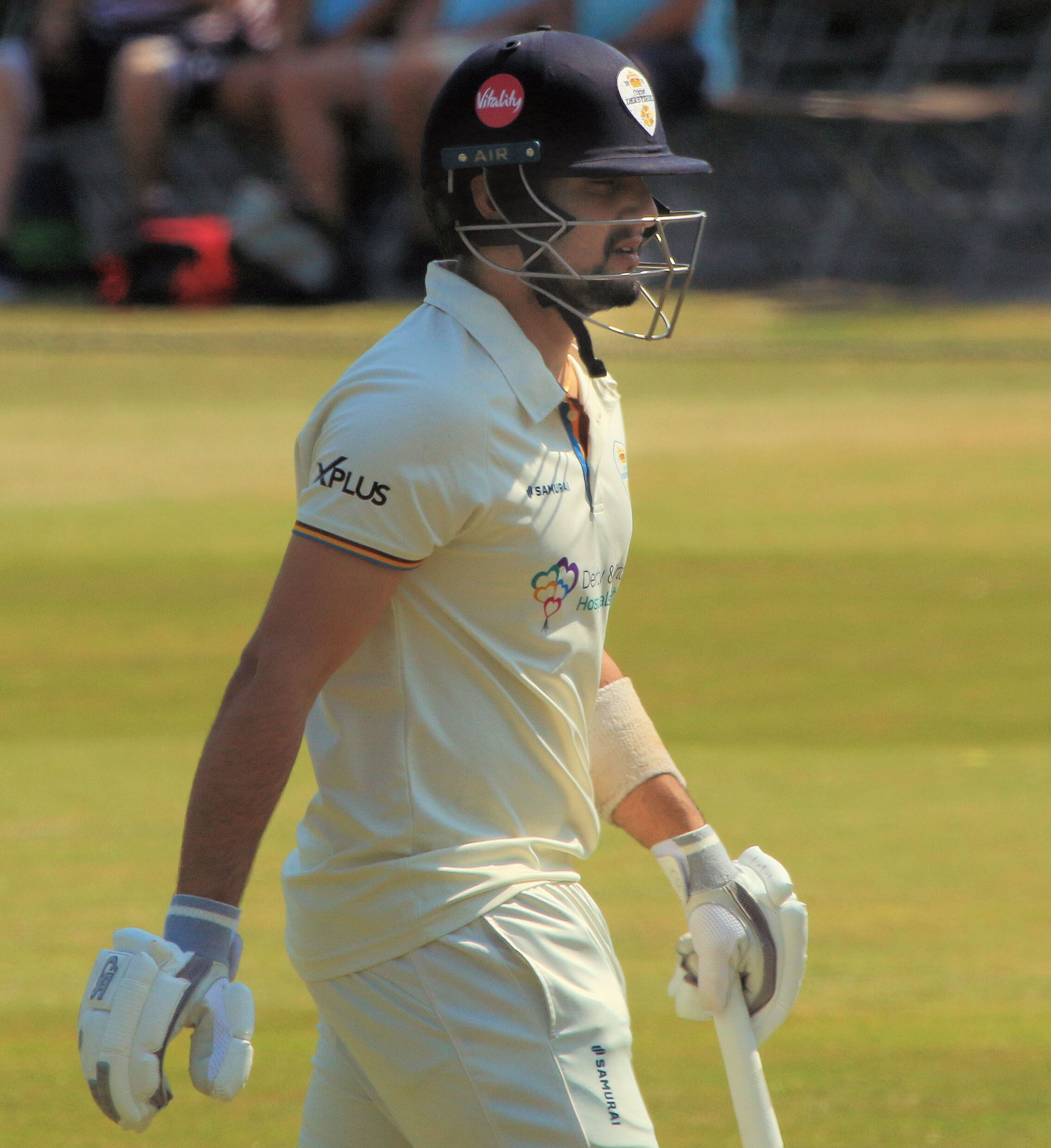
Ali batting for Derbyshire in 2023.

In the BPL 2026 Auction, Ali was sold to Noakhali Express for 2025–26 Bangladesh Premier League.

== International career ==
In November 2019, he was named in Pakistan's squad for the 2019 ACC Emerging Teams Asia Cup in Bangladesh. He made his List A cricket debut for Pakistan, against Afghanistan, in the Emerging Teams Cup on 14 November 2019. In December 2019, he was named the vice-captain of Pakistan's squad for the 2020 Under-19 Cricket World Cup.

In May 2020, the Pakistan Cricket Board (PCB) awarded him a central contract, in a newly created Emerging Players' category, ahead of the 2020–21 season. In June 2020, he was named in a 29-man squad for Pakistan's tour to England during the COVID-19 pandemic. However, on 22 June 2020, Ali was one of three players from Pakistan's squad to test positive for COVID-19. Although he had shown no previous symptoms of the virus, he was advised to go into a period of self-isolation. On 21 August, he was named in Pakistan's Twenty20 International (T20I) squad, also for the series against England. He made his T20I debut for Pakistan, against England, on 1 September 2020. In his debut T20I match, he scored 54 runs, becoming the first cricketer for Pakistan to score a fifty on a T20I debut.

In October 2020, he was named in a 22-man squad of "probables" for Pakistan's home series against Zimbabwe. On 31 October 2020, he was added to Pakistan's One Day International (ODI) squad for the second match of the series. He made his ODI debut for Pakistan, against Zimbabwe, on 1 November 2020. In November 2020, he was named in Pakistan's 35-man squad for their tour to New Zealand.

In June 2021, Ali was named to Pakistan's squads for their tours of England and the West Indies. However, on 24 June 2021, he was withdrawn from Pakistan's squads, after breaching the bio-secure bubble at the 2021 Pakistan Super League tournament. In October 2021, he was named the vice-captain of the Pakistan Shaheens for their tour of Sri Lanka. In August 2022, Ali was named in Pakistan's squad for Asia cup 2022.
