= Alex Wharf =

English cricketer and umpire

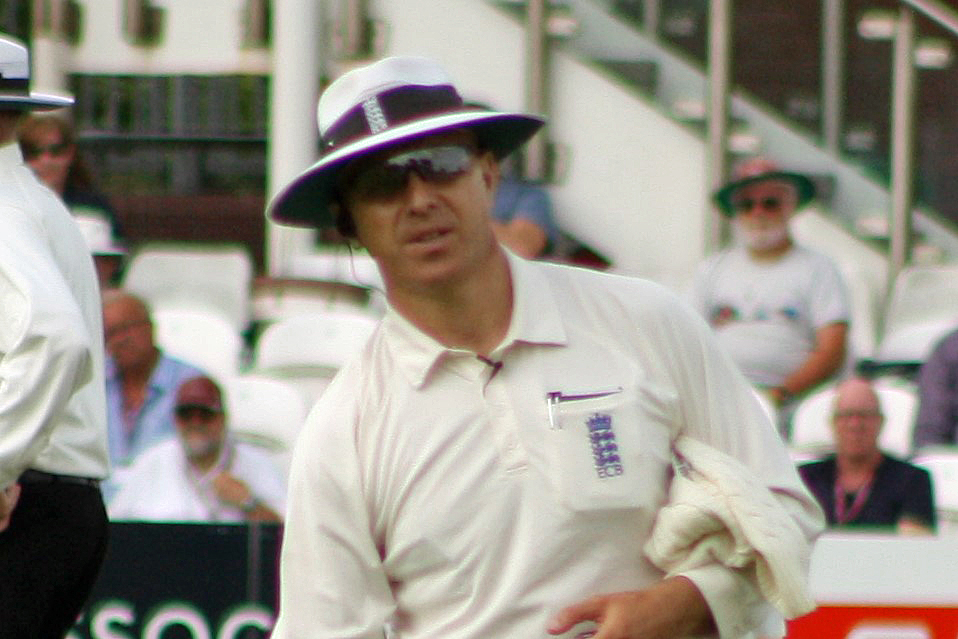

Personal information
- Full name: Alexander George Wharf
- Born: 4 June 1975 (age 51); Bradford, West Yorkshire, England
- Nickname: Gangster
- Height: 6 ft 4 in (1.93 m)
- Batting: Right-handed
- Bowling: Right-arm fast-medium
- Role: Bowler, umpire

International information
- National side: England (2004-2005)
- ODI debut (cap 183): 1 September 2004 v India
- Last ODI: 13 February 2005 v South Africa

Domestic team information
- Years: Team
- 1994–1997: Yorkshire
- 1998–1999: Nottinghamshire
- 2000–2009: Glamorgan

Umpiring information
- Tests umpired: 14 (2021–2025)
- ODIs umpired: 36 (2018–2025)
- T20Is umpired: 52 (2018–2026)
- WTests umpired: 2 (2015–2019)
- WODIs umpired: 11 (2011–2022)
- WT20Is umpired: 13 (2013–2020)

Career statistics
Competition	ODI	FC	LA	T20
Matches	13	121	155	33
Runs scored	19	3,570	1,411	157
Batting average	9.50	23.03	16.21	12.07
100s/50s	0/0	6/14	0/1	0/0
Top score	9	128*	72	19
Balls bowled	584	16,825	6,497	644
Wickets	18	293	192	39
Bowling average	23.77	37.34	28.91	26.35
5 wickets in innings	0	5	1	0
10 wickets in match	0	1	0	0
Best bowling	4/24	6/59	6/5	4/39
Catches/stumpings	1/–	63/–	42/–	5/–
- Source: Cricinfo, 21 June 2023

Alexander George Wharf (born 4 June 1975) is an English cricket umpire and former international cricketer. He is a right-handed batsman and a right-handed fast-medium bowler, who ended his career with the Welsh side Glamorgan County Cricket Club. Currently, he is a member of the ICC Elite umpire panel.

== Domestic career ==
Wharf commenced his first-class cricketing career with Yorkshire in 1994, and played seven such matches for the county until 1997. He later joined Nottinghamshire, before moving to Glamorgan in 2000.

Wharf announced his retirement from cricket during the 2009 County Championship, after failing to recover from a long-term injury. In 2010, Wharf played in the South Wales Premier Cricket League for Sully Centurians.

== International career ==
He never played Test cricket, but made his England One Day International debut at Trent Bridge, Nottingham, against India in 2004. Altogether he won 13 ODI caps.

== Umpiring career ==
In 2011, he was added to the England and Wales Cricket Board list of reserve umpires, alongside the late Russell Evans and Billy Taylor.

Along with Rob Bailey, he was one of the two onfield umpires for the Hurricane Relief T20 Challenge match played at Lord's on 31 May 2018. The next month, he stood in his first One Day International (ODI) match, between England and Australia, at Sophia Gardens in Cardiff on 16 June 2018.

In October 2019, he was appointed as one of the twelve umpires to officiate matches in the 2019 ICC T20 World Cup Qualifier tournament in the United Arab Emirates. In February 2020, the ICC named him as one of the umpires to officiate in matches during the 2020 ICC Women's T20 World Cup in Australia. In June 2021, Wharf was named as the fourth official for the 2021 ICC World Test Championship Final. In August 2021, in the third match between England and India, Wharf stood in his first Test match as an umpire.

In February 2022, he was named as one of the on-field umpires for the 2022 Women's Cricket World Cup in New Zealand. In September 2023, he was named as one of the sixteen match officials for 2023 Cricket World Cup. In March 2025, he was promoted to ICC Elite Umpire Panel.

== See also ==
- List of Test cricket umpires
- List of One Day International cricket umpires
- List of Twenty20 International cricket umpires
