= Michael Gough (cricketer) =

English cricket umpire

Personal information
- Full name: Michael Andrew Gough
- Born: 18 December 1979 (age 46); Hartlepool, County Durham, England
- Batting: Right-handed
- Bowling: Right-arm off-break
- Role: Opening batsman, umpire

Domestic team information
- Years: Team
- 1998–2003: Durham
- FC debut: 13 May 1998 Durham v Essex
- Last FC: 13 August 2003 Durham v Glamorgan
- LA debut: 13 June 1999 Durham v Sussex
- Last LA: 7 May 2003 Durham v Berkshire

Umpiring information
- Tests umpired: 42 (2016–2025)
- ODIs umpired: 93 (2013–2025)
- T20Is umpired: 28 (2013–2024)
- WODIs umpired: 6 (2008–2018)
- WT20Is umpired: 11 (2011–2016)

Career statistics
| Competition | First-class | List A |
|---|---|---|
| Matches | 67 | 49 |
| Runs scored | 2,952 | 974 |
| Batting average | 25.44 | 23.75 |
| 100s/50s | 2/15 | 1/3 |
| Top score | 123 | 132 |
| Balls bowled | 2,486 | 1,136 |
| Wickets | 30 | 21 |
| Bowling average | 45.00 | 45.09 |
| 5 wickets in innings | 1 | 0 |
| 10 wickets in match | 0 | 0 |
| Best bowling | 5/66 | 3/26 |
| Catches/stumpings | 57/– | 14/– |
- Source: ESPNcricinfo, 24 November 2023

Michael Andrew Gough (born 18 December 1979) is an English cricket umpire and former cricketer. He was a right-handed batsman and a right-arm off-break bowler. He was a member of the Elite Panel of ICC Umpires, representing the England and Wales Cricket Board.

== Playing career ==
Having played in two Youth Test matches in 1997, Gough impressed enough to become a fully fledged member of the Durham team of 1998, having previously been an occasional member of their Second XI team, and carrying on in this role for five more years. On his debut in Second XI cricket, he finished his first innings admirably, but got out for a duck in the second innings. Gough played in eleven Youth Test Matches, debuting in South Africa in December 1997, in a match which ended up as a draw having seen England Under-19s follow on from 130 runs behind. He subsequently played against Pakistan, New Zealand and Australia Under-19s.

He fell out of love with the sport at the highest level and retired at the age of 23. During a spell working in his father's sports shop in Hartlepool, he played football for Horden, Spennymoor Town, Barrow and in the Hartlepool Sunday Morning League, he decided he wanted to get involved in cricket as a coach or umpire. He took umpiring exams at Stockton Cricket Club during the winter of 2005 and umpired his first match in the summer of 2005 (Bishop Auckland 3rds v Sedgefield 3rds). Michael has also refereed in the Hartlepool Sunday Morning Football League.

== Umpiring career ==
Gough umpired in the Second XI Championship and in the Second XI trophy, officiating his first game in April 2006. He has umpired in several ODI games and Twenty20 Internationals since he made his debut as an international umpire in 2013. He was one of the twenty umpires during the 2015 Cricket World Cup. On 28 July 2016 he stood in his first Test match, between Zimbabwe and New Zealand at the Queens Sports Club in Bulawayo.

In April 2019, he was named as one of the sixteen umpires to stand in matches during the 2019 Cricket World Cup. In July 2019, Gough along with Joel Wilson, were promoted to the Elite Panel of ICC Umpires, following the retirement of Ian Gould and exclusion of Sundaram Ravi.

In April 2020, he was cited as the umpire with the highest percentage of his on-field decisions upheld after a player review, with 95.1% of his on-field decisions upheld after a player review, from all of the 14 umpires who have officiated in at least 10 Test matches since September 28, 2017.

Gough was named the ECB Umpire Of The Year for an unprecedented 8 years in a row from 2010. In June 2021, Gough was named as one of the on-field umpires for the 2021 ICC World Test Championship Final.

In September 2023, he was named as one of the sixteen match officials for 2023 Cricket World Cup.

In May 2024, Gough was named as one of the 23 match officials for the 2024 ICC Men’s T20 World Cup.

Gough was removed from the ICC Elite Panel in March 2025 along with Joel Wilson.

== Personal life ==
He is a supporter of Hartlepool United FC and in January 2021 was appointed honorary president of the Hartlepool United Supporters Trust

== See also ==
- List of Test cricket umpires
- List of One Day International cricket umpires
- List of Twenty20 International cricket umpires
