= Ahsan Raza =

Pakistani cricketer and umpire

Personal information
- Full name: Ahsan Raza
- Born: 29 May 1974 (age 52); Lahore, Punjab, Pakistan
- Batting: Right-handed
- Role: Batsman, Wicket-keeper, Umpire

Domestic team information
- Years: Team
- 1993–1994: Faisalabad
- 1993–2000: Habib Bank Limited
- 1996–1999: Lahore City
- 1994–1995: Sargodha
- First-class debut: 27 October 1993 Habib Bank Ltd v PAC
- Last First-class: 29 January 2000 Habib Bank Ltd v Islamabad
- List A debut: 26 November 1993 Habib Bank Ltd v PAC
- Last List A: 4 October 1999 Habib Bank Ltd v Gujranwala

Umpiring information
- Tests umpired: 45 (2021–2026)
- ODIs umpired: 96 (2010–2026)
- T20Is umpired: 124 (2010–2026)
- WODIs umpired: 12 (2013–2026)
- WT20Is umpired: 22 (2015–2026)

Career statistics
Competition	FC	LA
Matches	21	4
Runs scored	192	3
Batting average	8	3
100s/50s	0/0	0/0
Top score	20	3
Balls bowled	0	0
Wickets	–	–
Bowling average	–	–
5 wickets in innings	–	–
10 wickets in match	–	n/a
Best bowling	–	–
Catches/stumpings	56/7	2/2
- Source: ESPNcricinfo, 23 November 2023

Ahsan Raza (born 29 May 1974) is a Pakistani cricket umpire and former cricketer. In November 2020, in the second Twenty20 International (T20I) between Pakistan and Zimbabwe, he officiated in his 50th T20I match as an on-field umpire, becoming the first umpire to reach the milestone in T20I cricket.

== Playing career ==
Ahsan Raza played for a number of Pakistani teams including Faisalabad, Habib Bank Limited, Lahore and Sargodha.

== Umpiring career ==
Ahsan Raza is Pakistan's nominated third umpire on the International Cricket Council International Panel of Umpires and Referees. He made his debut as a first-class umpire in 2006 and had umpired 35 matches by the end of February 2009. He was awarded a contract as an umpire from the Pakistan Cricket Board (PCB) along with Zameer Haider and Shozab Raza in 2012.

He was among the on-field umpires for the 2018 Under-19 Cricket World Cup, and the 2018 ICC Women's World Twenty20. In October 2019, he was appointed as one of the twelve umpires to officiate matches in the 2019 ICC T20 World Cup Qualifier tournament in the United Arab Emirates.

In February 2020, the ICC named him as one of the umpires to officiate in matches during the 2020 ICC Women's T20 World Cup in Australia. Raza was also named as one of the two on-field umpires for the final of the tournament. In December 2020, he was shortlisted as one of the Umpire of the Year for the 2020 PCB Awards. In January 2021, he umpired in his first Test match, in Pakistan's home series against South Africa.

In March 2023, Raza and Adrian Holdstock from South Africa were inducted in the Elite Panel of ICC Umpires after Aleem Dar left the panel. In September 2023, he was named as one of the sixteen match officials for 2023 Cricket World Cup. In May 2024, Raza was named as one of the 23 match officials for the 2024 ICC Men’s T20 World Cup.

== Attack ==
On 3 March 2009, Ahsan Raza was serving as the reserve umpire for the second Test match between Pakistan and Sri Lanka in Lahore, when the vehicle he was travelling in was targeted in a terrorist attack on the Sri Lankan cricket team. He was critically injured during the attack, in which he was shot twice, resulting in him being taken to hospital in a serious condition.

== See also ==
- List of Test cricket umpires
- List of One Day International cricket umpires
- List of Twenty20 International cricket umpires
