= Rashid Riaz =

Pakistani cricket umpire (born 1976)

Personal information
- Born: 27 February 1976 (age 50); Chiniot, Punjab, Pakistan
- Role: Umpire

Umpiring information
- ODIs umpired: 21 (2019–2025)
- T20Is umpired: 53 (2018–2026)
- WODIs umpired: 15 (2015–2021)
- WT20Is umpired: 11 (2015–2019)
- Source: Cricinfo, 28 November 2023

Rashid Riaz (born 27 February 1976) is a Pakistani cricket umpire and former first-class cricketer. He has stood in matches in the 2015–16 Quaid-e-Azam Trophy. As an umpire, the first Twenty20 International (T20I) and the first One Day International (ODI) he officiated in were played between Pakistan and Australia, on 28 October 2018, and 29 March 2019, respectively.

In October 2019, he was appointed as one of the twelve umpires for the 2019 ICC T20 World Cup Qualifier tournament in the United Arab Emirates. In January 2020, he was named as one of the sixteen umpires for the 2020 Under-19 Cricket World Cup tournament in South Africa. He was one of the on-field umpires for the 2022 ICC Under-19 Cricket World Cup in the West Indies.

== See also ==
- List of Twenty20 International cricket umpires
- List of One Day International cricket umpires
