= Faisal Afridi =

Pakistani cricket umpire

Personal information
- Full name: Faisal Khan Afridi
- Born: 31 December 1977 (age 48); Sargodha, Punjab, Pakistan, Pakistan
- Batting: Right-handed
- Bowling: Right-arm fast-medium
- Role: Umpire

Umpiring information
- ODIs umpired: 4 (2023–2025)
- T20Is umpired: 23 (2022–2025)
- WODIs umpired: 13 (2018–2025)
- WT20Is umpired: 14 (2018–2024)
- Source: Cricinfo, 3 May 2023

Faisal Afridi (born 31 December 1977) is a Pakistani cricket umpire and former first-class cricketer.

== Career ==
Afridi played 53 first-class and 35 List A matches between 1998 and 2008. As an umpire, he debuted in the match between National Bank of Pakistan and Water and Power Development Authority in the 2017–18 Quaid-e-Azam Trophy on 21 October 2017. In December 2018, he was one of the on-field umpires for the final of the 2018–19 Quaid-e-Azam Trophy.

In October 2021, Afridi was promoted to the International Panel of ICC Umpires, replacing Shozab Raza. He stood in his first Twenty20 International (T20I) match, between Pakistan and England on 23 September 2022. He officiated in his first One Day International (ODI) match, between Pakistan and New Zealand on 3 May 2023.

== See also ==
- List of One Day International cricket umpires
- List of Twenty20 International cricket umpires
