= 2021 Pakistan Super League final =

Cricket match

2021 Pakistan Super League Final
- Event: 2021 Pakistan Super League
Multan Sultans	Peshawar Zalmi
Multan Sultans team colors
206/4	159/9
20 overs	20 overs
- Multan Sultans won by 47 runs
- Date: 24 June 2021
- Venue: Sheikh Zayed Cricket Stadium, Abu Dhabi
- Player of the match: Sohaib Maqsood (Multan Sultans)
- Umpires: Aleem Dar; Ahsan Raza

The 2021 Pakistan Super League Final was a Twenty20 cricket match played on 24 June 2021 at the Sheikh Zayed Cricket Stadium in Abu Dhabi, United Arab Emirates between Multan Sultans and Peshawar Zalmi to determine the winner of the 2021 Pakistan Super League (PSL).

== Background ==
Peshawar Zalmi's Haider Ali and Umaid Asif were suspended from the final against the Multan Sultans after both players confessed to charges of violating the tournament's COVID-19-related health and safety protocols by meeting people from outside their bio-secure bubbles. A press release by Pakistan Cricket Board stated that the duo "were found not to have interacted with any other squad members at any time after the incident" and were "placed in room isolation". 2017 tournament champions Zalmi qualified for their fourth final while it was a first-ever final for Sultans. The prize money for the winners and runners-up was set at Rs.75 million and Rs.30 million, respectively.

== Summary ==
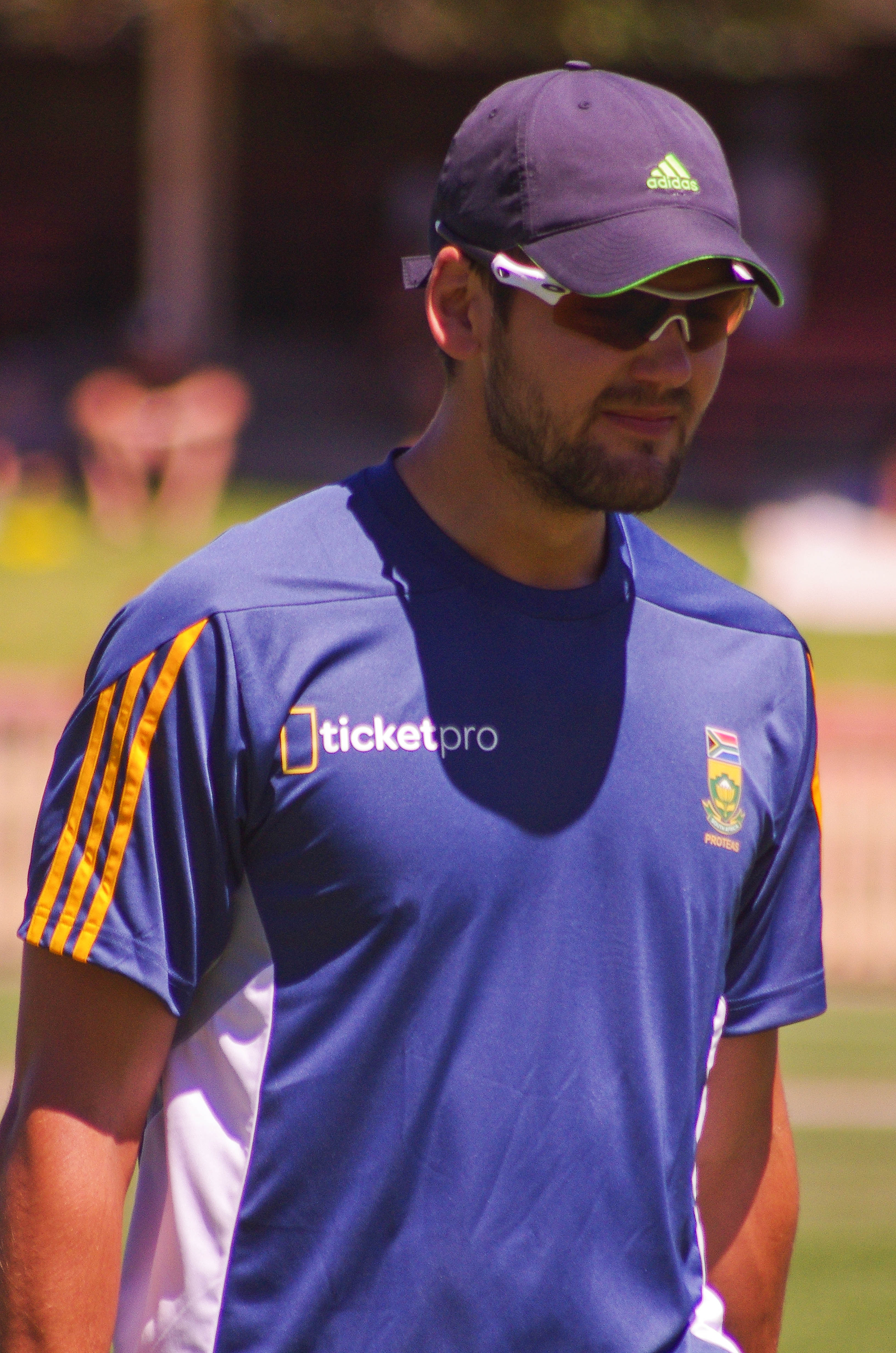
Rilee Rossouw (pictured in 2014) hit a 50 to get Multan past 200.

Peshawar won the toss and chose to bowl in the final. Shan Masood and Mohammad Rizwan opened the innings for the Sultans. Shan was dismissed first for 37 by Mohammad Imran. At the other end, Multan's captain, Mohammad Rizwan, was caught behind for 30 as Mohammad Imran claimed a second wicket. Afterwards, came Sohaib Maqsood, who made an unbeaten 65. This later won Maqsood the player of the match award. Rilee Rossouw followed Maqsood and made 50 in 20 balls, before he top edged a ramp to Mohammad Irfan as Sameen Gul claimed his first wicket of the match. The third wicket partnership between Maqsood and Rossouw was worth 98. Things got better for Sameen as he got out Johnson Charles Leg before wicket (LBW) for a golden duck. While at six was Khushdil Shah, who scored an unbeaten 15 off 5 balls to increase Multan's score. In the end, Multan finished on 206/4; the pick of the bowlers for Peshawar was Sameen Gul, who finished with figures of 2/26. In response, Hazratullah Zazai was first to score 6 for Peshawar before being caught at point by Shan Masood. Zazai was soon followed by Kamran Akmal, as he was bowled by Imran Khan for 36. Jonathan Wells was next, and he was run out for 6. Some stability was provided by Shoaib Malik and Rovman Powell, when Powell was caught behind for 23, Peshawar were 124/4. Malik was then caught out for 48 off 28 by Imran Tahir. Tahir then took a wicket himself as Sherfane Rutherford was dismissed for 18. Afterwards, Tahir claimed two more wickets as both Wahab Riaz and Mohammed Imran were bowled by him for golden ducks. Next to go was Amad Butt, as he was caught by Mohammad Rizwan for 7. In the end, Peshawar finished on 159/9, which resulted in a 47 run victory for Multan, making them the champions of PSL 6.

== Scorecard ==
keys:

- † indicates team captain
- * indicates not out

Toss: Peshawar Zalmi won the toss and elected to field.

Result: Multan Sultans won by 47 runs

Multan Sultans innings
Player	Status	Runs	Balls	4s	6s	Strike rate
Shaan Masood	b Mohammad Imran	37	29	6	0	127.58
Mohammad Rizwan†	c †Kamran Akmal b Mohammad Imran	30	30	2	1	100.00
Sohaib Maqsood	*	65	35	6	3	185.71
Rilee Rossouw	c Mohammad Irfan b Sameen Gul	50	21	5	3	238.09
Johnson Charles	lbw b Sameen Gul	0	1	0	0	0.00
Khushdil Shah	*	15	5	0	2	300.00
Sohail Tanvir	did not bat					
Imran Tahir	did not bat					
Blessing Muzarabani	did not bat					
Imran Khan	did not bat					
Shahnawaz Dahani	did not bat					
Extras 9 (b1, lb 1, nb 1, wd 6); Total 206/4 (20 overs)				19	9	10.30 RR

Fall of wickets: 1-68 (Shan Masood, 8.4 ov), 2-83 (Mohammad Rizwan, 10.6 ov), 3-181 (Rilee Rossouw, 18.2 ov), 4-181 (Johnson Charles, 18.3 ov)

Peshawar Zalmi bowling
Bowler	Overs	Maidens	Runs	Wickets	Econ	Wides	NBs
Sameen Gul	4	0	26	2	6.50	2	0
Mohammad Irfan	4	0	27	0	6.75	0	0
Wahab Riaz	4	0	52	0	13.00	3	0
Amad Butt	4	0	52	0	13.00	0	1
Mohammad Imran	4	0	47	2	11.75	0	0

Target: 207 runs from 20 overs at 10.35 RR

Peshawar Zalmi innings
Player	Status	Runs	Balls	4s	6s	Strike rate
Kamran Akmal	b Imran Khan	36	28	5	1	128.57
Hazratullah Zazai	c Shan Masood b Blessing Muzarabani	6	5	0	1	120.00
Jonathan Wells	run out (Rilee Rossouw/Sohail Tanvir)	6	13	3	3	46.15
Shoaib Malik	c Imran Tahir b Sohail Tanvir	48	28	3	3	171.42
Rovman Powell	c †Mohammad Rizwan b Blessing Muzarabani	23	14	2	1	164.28
Sherfane Rutherford	c †Mohammad Rizwan b Imran Tahir	18	10	1	2	180.00
Amad Butt	c †Mohammad Rizwan b Imran Khan	7	6	1	0	116.66
Wahab Riaz†	b Imran Tahir	0	1	0	0	0.00
Mohammad Imran	b Imran Tahir	0	1	0	0	0.00
Sameen Gul	*	7	11	1	0	63.63
Mohammad Irfan	*	0	5	0	0	0.00
Extras 8 (nb 2, wd 6); Total 159/9 (20 overs)				16	11	7.95 RR

Fall of wickets: 1-42 (Hazratullah Zazai, 5.2 ov), 2-42 (Kamran Akmal, 6.1 ov), 3-58 (Jonathan Wells, 9.2 ov), 4-124 (Rovman Powell, 14.1 ov), 5-137 (Shoaib Malik, 15.1 ov), 6-150 (Sherfane Rutherford, 16.3 ov), 7-151 (Wahab Riaz, 16.5 ov), 8-151 (Mohammad Imran, 16.6 ov), 9-151 (Amad Butt, 17.2 ov)

Multan Sultans bowling
Bowler	Overs	Maidens	Runs	Wickets	Econ	Wides	NBs
Sohail Tanvir	4	0	35	1	8.75	0	0
Imran Khan	4	1	27	2	6.75	1	1
Blessing Muzarabani	4	0	26	2	6.50	0	1
Shahnawaz Dahani	4	0	38	0	9.50	2	0
Imran Tahir	4	0	33	3	8.25	3	0

== Match Officials ==
Role	Name
On field Umpire	(Pakistan) Ahsan Raza
On field Umpire	(Pakistan) Aleem Dar
TV Umpire	(Pakistan) Asif Yaqoob
Reserve Umpire	(Pakistan) Rashid Riaz
Match Referee	(Pakistan) Mohammed Anees

== See also ==
- Multan Sultans in 2021
- Peshawar Zalmi in 2021
