= Tayyar Hain =

2020 Pakistan Super League official anthem

Promotional single by various artists
- Language: Urdu
- Released: 28 January 2020
- Genre: Stadium anthem
- Length: 4:58
- Label: Pepsi
- Songwriter: Zulfiqar Jabbar Khan

Pakistan Super League anthems chronology
"Khel Deewano Ka" (2019)	"Tayyar Hain" (2020)	"Groove Mera" (2021)

"Tayyar Hain" (Urdu: تیار ہیں, lit. 'We're Ready') is a 2020 song, written by Zulfiqar Jabbar Khan (Xulfi) and performed by Ali Azmat, Haroon, Asim Azhar, and Arif Lohar. Released in collaboration with Pepsi Pakistan, it served as the official anthem of the fifth season of the Pakistan Super League.

The anthem's theme was designed to welcome the PSL 2020, which was scheduled to be held entirely in Pakistan for the first time. However, the anthem and the opening ceremony faced criticism, and sparked controversies among the anthem artists and the management. Public reaction led Azmat to criticise the management while Azhar to apologize, and Ali Zafar to subsequently release another anthem for the fans.

== Background and release ==
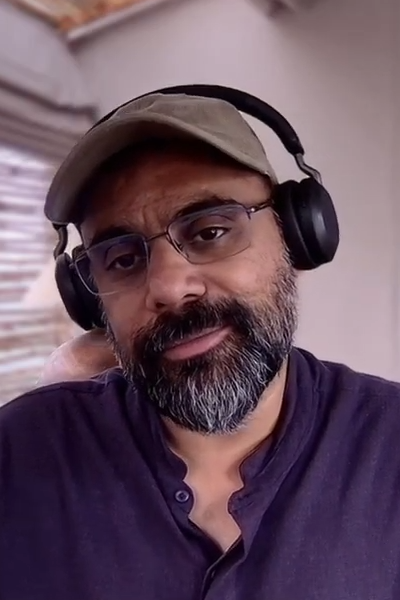
Xulfi

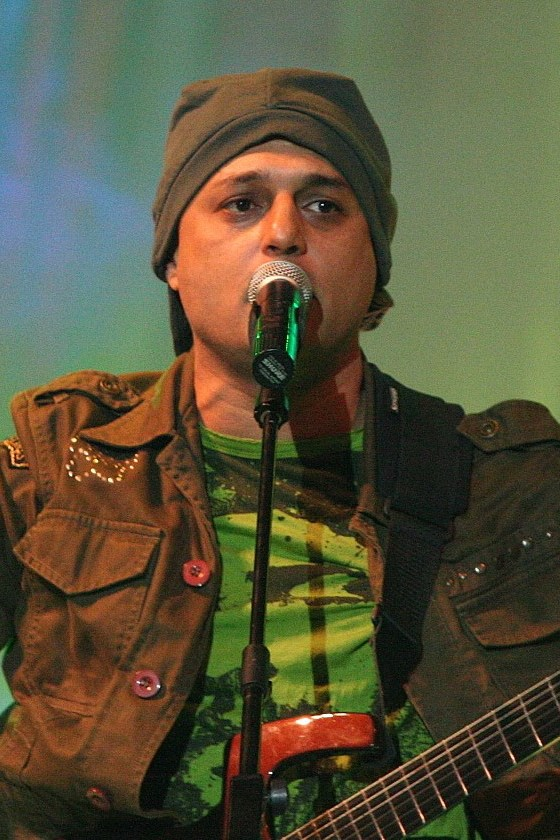
Ali Azmat

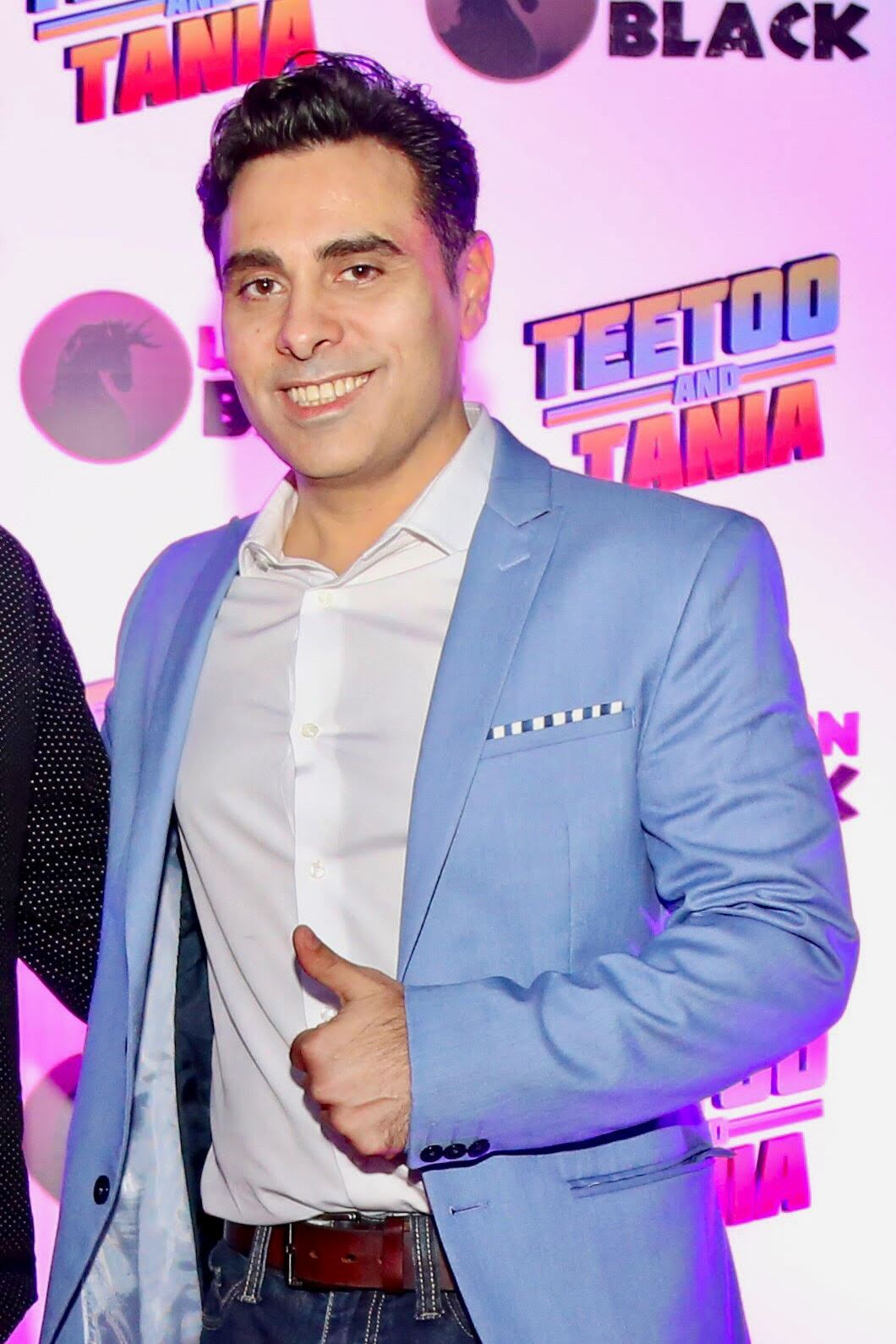
Haroon

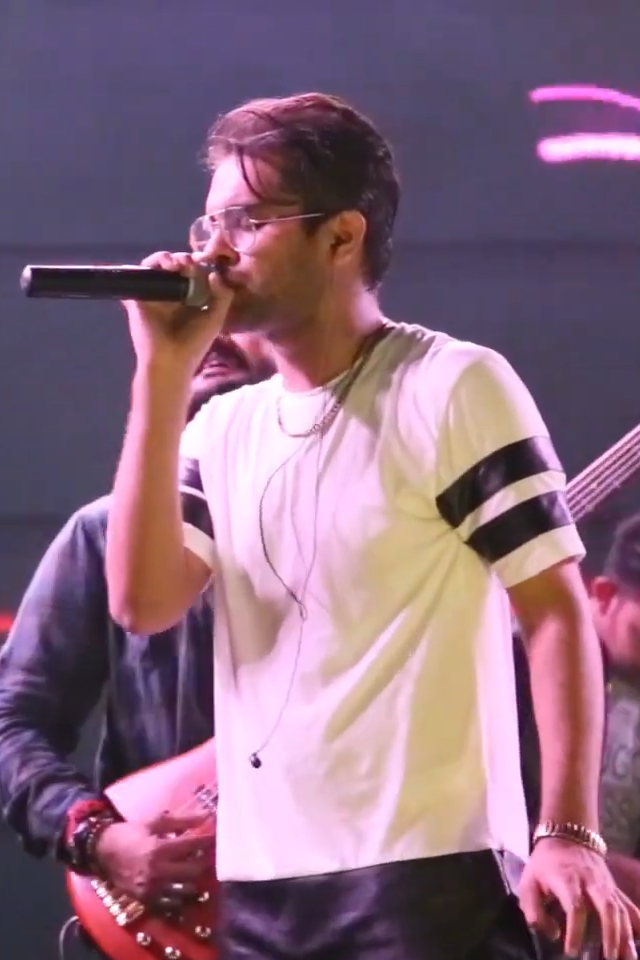
Asim Azhar

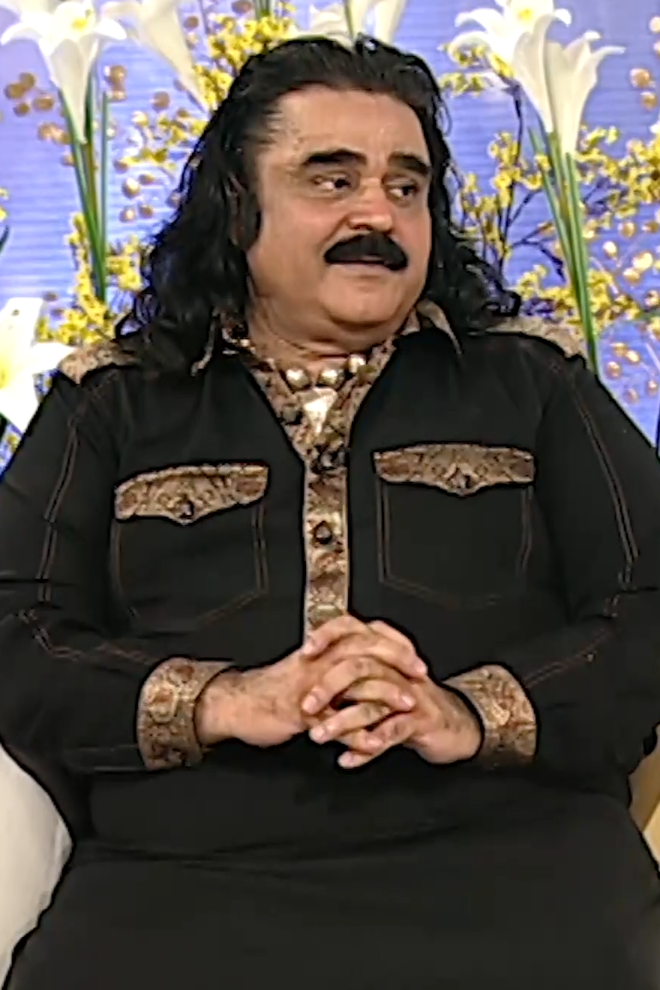
Arif Lohar

Anthem artists

The anthem was officially announced a day before its release. It was stated in the press release that the song would show the celebration of nation because Pakistan was ready to host all the matches of the league for the first time. Xulfi commented that when he was approached for the song, the concept struck was "Tayyar Hain", and then they wrote the lyrics to define the readiness. More than 20 instruments were recorded in a variety of styles. He was joined by Arif Lohar, Ali Azmat, Haroon Rashid, and Asim Azhar, all being cricket fans themselves.

Earlier in December 2019, it was rumoured that Atif Aslam was part of 2020 PSL anthem, which he denied.

On 28 January 2020, an event was held at a hotel in Lahore where the song was presented to the PCB and PSL officials before being released. The anthem released simultaneously on multiple platforms, including social media as well as major television networks across the country before 9:00 PM. The music video is directed by Kamal Khan of Pakistani film Laal Kabootar fame, and it stars cricketers Babar Azam, Hasan Ali, Rumman Raees, Sarfraz Ahmed, Shaheen Shah Afridi and Shan Masood.

Then PCB Chairman, Ehsan Mani, along with Atif Rana, Javed Afridi, Alamgir Khan Tareen, Nadeem Omar, Ali Naqvi and Salman Iqbal; franchise officials of Lahore Qalandars, Peshawar Zalmi, Multan Sultans, Quetta Gladiators, Islamabad United, and Karachi Kings respectively, also praised the anthem and showed their readiness for the league.

== Opening ceremony ==
The opening ceremony was held on 20 February 2020 at the National Stadium, Karachi, prior to the first match of the season. Directed by Shubhra Bhardwaj, the show began with the "Qaumi Taranah", before a group of drummers and trumpeters performed an instrumental version of the official PSL 2020 anthem. Later, a Sufi medley was performed by singer Sanam Marvi, qawwals Fareed Ayaz and Abu Mohammad, and the band Soch. This was followed by Sajjad Ali, Aima Baig, Abrar-ul-Haq and Rahat Fateh Ali Khan taking the stage one after another to perform their songs. The ceremony concluded with Azmat, Lohar, Haroon, and Azhar taking the stage for the PSL anthem, accompanied by a fireworks display in the background.

== Criticism and controversies ==
Reportedly, "Tayyar Hain" received heavy criticism particularly on social media. The backlash led Asim Azhar to apologise for disappointing cricket fans. Ali Azmat called that a campaign against the anthem had been planted, and pointed out the management for not playing the complete song at the opening ceremony as the parts of Azhar and Haroon were trimmed out. Upon fan demand, journalist Waseem Badami called Ali Zafar to make another anthem, whose "Ab Khel Jamay Ga" from the PSL season II remained a fan favourite. Despite Zafar initially showing support towards "Tayyar Hain", he consequently released "Mela Loot Liya". Contrary, Xulfi also composed a parallel anthem "Khel Ja Dil Se", written by Adnan Dhool and performed by Fawad Khan, Aima Baig, Haroon Shahid, and Kashmir (band), and it was also released by Pepsi Pakistan. (Note: Pieces of information and criticism are extracted from The News, The Express Tribune, Business Recorder, journalist Arfa Feroz, and Diva Online.)

Despite criticism, "Tayyar Hain" was claimed to be the fastest PSL anthem in its viewership within days of its release, according to the stats released by the PSL and Giraffe Pakistan, Xulfi's record label. Contrary to what was stated in the press release, a review in Dawn noted that the music video "does not carry any highlights of previous matches of the PSL" and failed to "reflect the huge juncture" that the league was being entirely held in Pakistan for the first time.

Saleem Khaliq of Express News reported that the ceremony cost an estimated Rs. 21 crore; however, Khalid Hussain reported in The News that the ceremony's execution was also "duly criticised". Ahmed Godil, a stadium host, and Ali Azmat, both also claimed that the opening ceremony was poorly managed. Reportedly, the view of two enclosures was also blocked by placing the screens, thus causing a logistic failure and refunds in tickets sale. Godil was not supposed to be televised, instead Fakhar-e-Alam was the television host; however, Godil faced cyber trolling as he went on-air. Ultimately, he was terminated after he clarified his responsibilities in an interview. (Note: Claims and controversies are extracted from Business Recorder, Geo News, and 24 Digital.)

In later years, Ahmer Naqvi of Dunya Digital and Ali A. Rizvi of The Jungle Today compared this anthem with the PSL's other anthems, and criticised its execution by noting the wrongly collaborating multiple artists from different genres.

== See also ==
External media

Audio
- Tayyar Hain on SoundCloud

Video
- Music video on YouTube
- Opening ceremony performance on YouTube

- List of Pakistan Super League anthems
- "Mela Loot Liya"
