= Siddique Khan Baloch =

Pakistani politician

- صدیق خان بلوچ

Member of the National Assembly of Pakistan
- Incumbent
- Assumed office 29 February 2024
- Constituency: NA-155 Lodhran-II
- In office 2013–2015
- Constituency: Constituency NA-154 (Lodhran-I)
- In office 2008–2013
- Constituency: Constituency NA-154 (Lodhran-I)

Member of the Provincial Assembly of the Punjab
- In office 15 August 2018 – 14 January 2023
- Constituency: PP-227 Lodhran-IV
- In office 1997–1999
- Constituency: PP-171 (Lodhran-I)
- In office 1988–1993
- Constituency: PP-171 (Multan-XII)

Personal details
- Party: PMLN (1993-present)
- Other political affiliations: IJI (1988-1990)

Muhammad Siddique Khan Baloch (Urdu: محمد صدیق خان بلوچ) is a Pakistani politician who has been a member of the National Assembly of Pakistan since February 2024 and previously served in this position from 2008 to October 2015. He was a member of the Provincial Assembly of the Punjab from 1988 to 1993, from 1997 to 1999, and from August 2018 to January 2023.

== Early life ==
He was born in 1959.

== Political career ==
He was elected to the Provincial Assembly of the Punjab as a candidate of Islami Jamhoori Ittehad (IJI) from Constituency PP-171 (Multan-XII) in the 1988 Pakistani general election. He received 15,410 votes and defeated an independent candidate, Amanullah Khan. He served as the Provincial Parliamentary Secretary of Punjab for Colonies and Agriculture Department from 1988 to 1990.

He was re-elected to the Provincial Assembly of Punjab as a candidate of IJI from Constituency PP-171 (Multan-XII) in the 1990 Pakistani general election. He received 37,793 votes and defeated Amanullah Khan, a candidate of Pakistan Democratic Alliance.

He ran for the seat of the Provincial Assembly of Punjab as a candidate of Pakistan Muslim League (N) (PML-N) from Constituency PP-171 (Lodhran-I) in the 1993 Pakistani general election. He received 33,417 votes and lost the seat to Amanullah Khan, a candidate of Pakistan Peoples Party (PPP).

He was re-elected to the Provincial Assembly of Punjab as a candidate of PML-N from PP-171 (Lodhran-I) in the 1997 Pakistani general election. He received 48,604 votes and defeated Amanullah Khan, a candidate of PPP. During his tenure as Member of the Punjab Assembly, he served as Provincial Parliamentary Secretary of Punjab for Livestock and Dairy Development until 1999 Pakistani coup d'état.

He could not contest the 2002 Pakistani general election for being non-eligible due to graduation requirement.

He was elected to the National Assembly of Pakistan as a candidate of Pakistan Muslim League (Q) (PML-Q) from Constituency NA-154 (Lodhran-I) in the 2008 Pakistani general election. He received 81,983 votes and defeated Mirza Muhammad Nasir Baig, a candidate of PPP.

He was re-elected to the National Assembly as independent candidate from Constituency NA-154 (Lodhran-I) in the 2013 Pakistani general election. He received 86,177 votes and defeated Jahangir Khan Tareen, a candidate of Pakistan Tehreek-e-Insaf (PTI). In the same election, he was re-elected to the Provincial Assembly of Punjab as an independent candidate from Constituency PP-210 (Lodhran-IV). He received 32,712 votes and defeated Rana Mohammad Aslam Khan, a candidate of PML-N. He decided to vacate his provincial seat and joined PML-N after winning the election.

In August 2015, he was unseated after he was declared disqualified to continue in office because of a fake degree case. In October 2015, the Supreme Court of Pakistan order by-polls in the constituency and allowed Baloch to contest.

He ran for the seat of the National Assembly as a candidate of PML-N from NA-154 (Lodhran-I) in by-polls held in December 2015, but was unsuccessful. He received 99,933 votes and was defeated by Jahangir Tareen, a candidate of PTI.

He was re-elected to Provincial Assembly of the Punjab as a candidate of PML-N from PP-227 (Lodhran-IV) in the 2018 Punjab provincial election. He also contested the 2018 Pakistani general election from NA-161 Lodhran-II as a candidate of PML-N, but was unsuccessful. He received votes and was defeated by Mian Muhammad Shafiq, a candidate of PTI.

He was re-elected to the National Assembly from NA-155 Lodhran-II as a candidate of PML-N in the 2024 Pakistani general election. He received 117,687 votes and defeated Jahangir Tareen, a candidate of Istehkam-e-Pakistan Party (IPP).
