= Mela Loot Liya =

2020 anthem by Ali Zafar

Single by Ali Zafar
- Released: 29 February 2020
- Recorded: February 2020
- Studio: Lightingale
- Genre: Pop music
- Length: 3:42
- Label: Lightingale
- Songwriter: Ali Zafar
- Producer: Ali Zafar
Music Video
- Directed by: Ali Zafar; Sonu Dangerous (asst. choreographer)
- Cinematography: Danyal Zafar; Omer Khalid Butt; Asif Masood; Yratta media
- Edited by: Asif Masood
- Release date: 1 March 2020
- Running time: 5:10

"Mela Loot Liya" (Urdu: "میلہ لوٹ لیا", lit. 'Stole the show') is a 2020 song, written, performed, and produced by Pakistani singer Ali Zafar under his Lightingale Records. It features a compilation of fan videos, and was created and released in response to the criticism of the official anthem of the fifth season of the Pakistan Super League.

== Background ==
Earlier in 2020, "Tayyar Hain", the official anthem of the fifth season of the Pakistan Super League (PSL), was released and received strong criticism from fans. Soon after, Ali Zafar's name began trending on Twitter in Pakistan as fans remembered him for his anthems in the first three editions of the PSL, particularly "Ab Khel Jamay Ga" from the second edition which remains popular with fans. However, reports suggested that there had been resistance in hiring Zafar or to play his songs during the matches, due to proceedings of the legal battle Ali Zafar vs. Meesha Shafi. Responding to fans, Zafar tweeted to support the brand and artists of the country.

After the PSL opening ceremony, Ali Azmat claimed in an interview with Waseem Badami on ARY News that bloggers were hired for a campaign against their anthem by a rival singer, however denied pointing towards Zafar. Badami conducted an online poll on Twitter, where fans showed high interest in Zafar's anthem. Therefore, Zafar announced on 23 February that he is preparing a new anthem, along with a new hashtag #BhaeeHazirHai. He asked the fans to record and share the dance steps for his music video. Azmat, Asim Azhar, and Haroon, singers of "Tayyar Hain", showed their support towards Zafar.

== Release ==
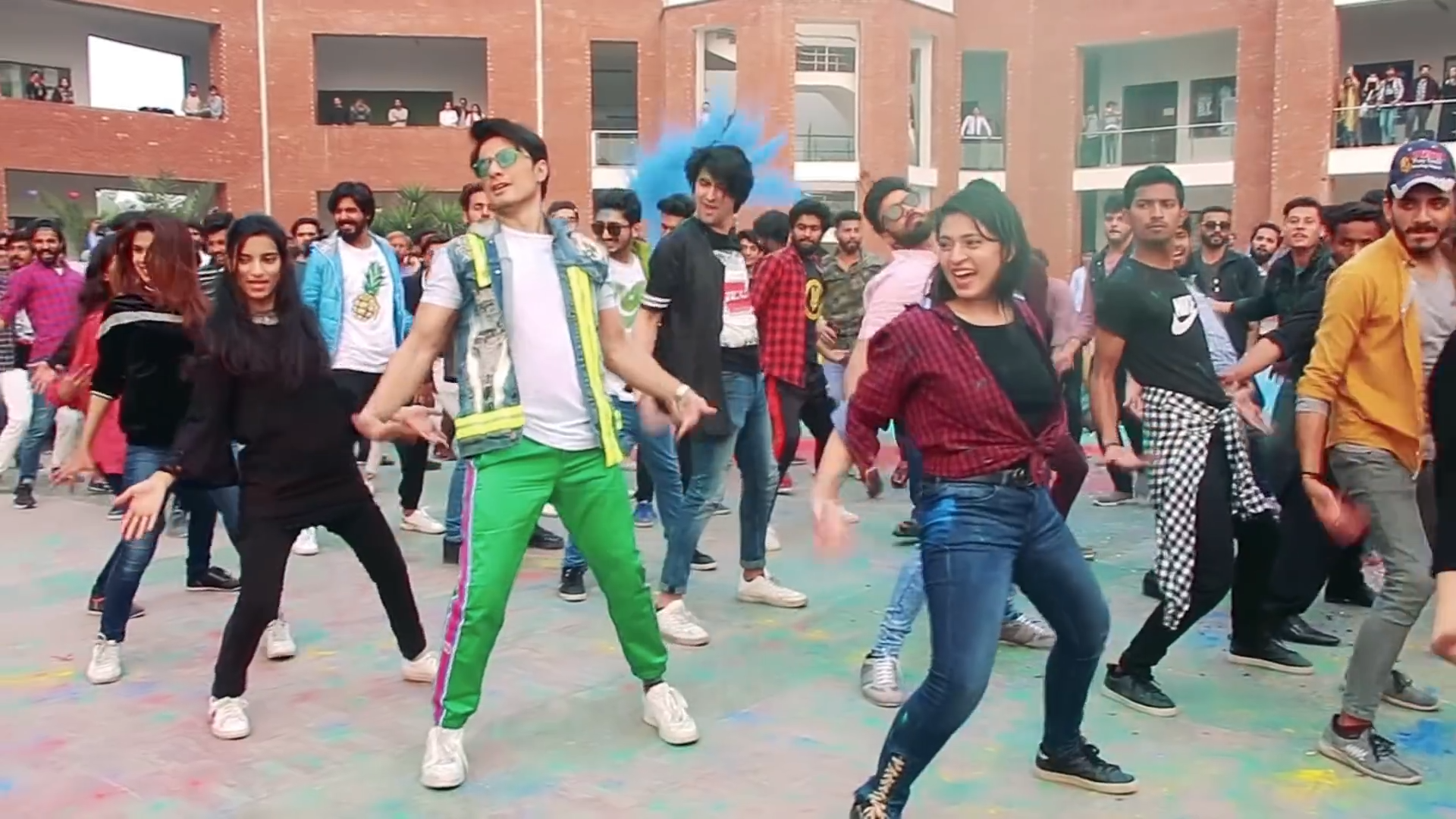
Filming of the music video at a college

The poster with the title "Mela Loot Liya" was revealed on 29 February. The anthem was released on 1 March on YouTube by Lightingale Records, and Zafar premiered the song at Waseem Badami's program as well. The News quoted Zafar that the process of making took hardly a week with a budget of less than Rs. 200,000, and he had not taken support from any sponsor. Filming took place at the National College of Arts (NCA), Superior University Lahore, and a learning hub by Ali Zafar Foundation in the Walled City of Lahore. A compilation of multiple fan videos from around the world was also used.

A petition was filed at a civil court in Lahore, which requested to direct the Pakistan Cricket Board and Pakistan Electronic Media Regulatory Authority to restrain Zafar's new anthem or it would "damage the rating and popularity of PSL", however, it was later withdrawn. A protest was also held at the NCA against Zafar by the supporters of Meesha Shafi.

== Reception ==
The video was conceived, directed, and choreographed by Ali Zafar and he credited the anthem to the fans. Reportedly, the anthem's digital reception soon beat "Tayyar Hain".

Madiha Shakeel of Business Recorder called it a "fun filled, energetic song" which fulfilled its hype. Usman Ghafoor of Gulf News reviewed as "a new Ali Zafar" with "high-energy, hyper-enthusiastic and a bit cocky" style, dancing and surrounded with the students and street children in the "form of flash mob", and with the catchy song title and an impromptu feel to the video. The News reviewed it by saying that "lyrics are a little displaced" but "the beat is catchy". Maliha Rehman of Dawn called it "a very clever online campaign" and Zafar's "ingenious" marketing "opportunity to strike back".

On Twitter, journalists like Arfa Feroz noted that it "has that boom to making stadium go gaga and crazy", while Ihtisham Ul Haq and Saleem Khaliq noted that Zafar definitely had stole the show. Javeria Siddique called Zafar "the star of the century", while Mirza Iqbal Baig commented that Zafar "rocked". Omair Alavi called it his second favourite for PSL behind "Ab Khel Jamay Ga", despite being an unofficial anthem. While Naimat Khan questioned the absence of cricket and PSL from the anthem, The News noted that Zafar "strategically" made "no reference" to these.

Later, at the 2021 Hum Style Awards, Zafar performed on the song with Alizeh Shah.

== See also ==
External media

Audio
- Full audio on YouTube

Video
- Music video on YouTube
- Stage performance on YouTube

- "Tayyar Hain"
- List of Pakistan Super League anthems
