= Muhammad Iqbal Shah =

Pakistani politician

- محمد اقبال شاہ

Member of the National Assembly of Pakistan
- In office 19 February 2018 – 31 May 2018
- Constituency: NA-154 (Lodhran-I)

Personal details
- Children: Aamir Iqbal Shah (son)

Muhammad Iqbal Shah Qureshi (Urdu: محمد اقبال شاہ قریشی) is a Pakistani politician who had been a member of the National Assembly of Pakistan, from February 2018 to May 2018.

== Education and personal life ==
He has done graduation in Lahore, Pakistan.

He is an agriculturist by profession and has declared his net worth at Rs. 90.48 million. He is social worker and known as a faith healer in his area.

== Political career ==
He remained Tehsil Nazim of Dunyapur from 2005 to 2009.

He for brief served as the Chairman Union Council before he was elected to the National Assembly of Pakistan as a candidate for Pakistan Muslim League (N) for Constituency NA-154 (Lodhran-I) in by-polls held in February 2018. He received 113,542 votes and defeated Ali Tareen, a candidate of Pakistan Tehreek-e-Insaf (PTI) and son of Jahangir Khan Tareen. The seat fell vacant following the disqualification of Jahangir Khan Tareen by the Supreme Court of Pakistan for being "dishonest" in December 2017. The constituency was considered a stronghold of Tareens and PTI and hence the defeat of a PTI candidate was termed a "a major upset" and "huge blow" to the party ahead of the July 2018 elections. He took an oath as Member of the National Assembly on 19 February 2018.
