= 2021 Multan Sultans season =

Franchise cricket team in Pakistan Super League

Multan Sultans
2021 season
- Coach: Andy Flower
- Captain: Mohammad Rizwan
- PSL 2021: Champions
- Most runs: Mohammad Rizwan (500)
- Most wickets: Shahnawaz Dahani (20)

The Multan Sultans is a franchise cricket team that represents Multan in the Pakistan Super League. The team made its PSL debut in 2018 season. Multan Sultans beat Peshawar Zalmi in the final by 47 runs to win their first PSL title.

== Background ==
Multan Sultans are the sixth team to join the league. 2018 was their inaugural season. After the league was started in 2016, this was the first expansion of the league. Tom Moody serves as their coach. Prior to the start of the fourth season, Schon Properties failed to pay the $5.2 million annual fee, and Pakistan Cricket Board had cancelled their franchise. After the cancellation, the PCB took responsibility of all player and coach contracts while the public tender process took place to grant the repackaged rights of the team. The PCB asked interested bidders to collect the bidding documents from its offices by 14 December 2018. The financial proposal of the technically qualified bidders is due to be opened on 18 December 2018. On 20 December 2018, PSL announced that Ali Tareen-led Multan consortium had won the franchise rights for the sixth team for a seven-year period, by exceeding the PCB's reserve price set at $5.21 million per year. Tareen's bid was for $6.35 million per year, making this the most expensive franchise.

== Kit manufacturers and sponsors ==
| Shirt sponsor (chest) | Shirt sponsor (back) | Chest branding | Sleeve branding |
|---|---|---|---|
| Pepsi | Fatima Group | G.F.C Fans | Snack Video, Asia Ghee |

Playing kit

== Points table ==
| Pos | Team | Pld | W | L | NR | Pts | NRR |
|---|---|---|---|---|---|---|---|
| 1 | Islamabad United (3rd) | 10 | 8 | 2 | 0 | 16 | 0.859 |
| 2 | Multan Sultans (C) | 10 | 5 | 5 | 0 | 10 | 1.050 |
| 3 | Peshawar Zalmi (R) | 10 | 5 | 5 | 0 | 10 | 0.586 |
| 4 | Karachi Kings (4th) | 10 | 5 | 5 | 0 | 10 | −0.115 |
| 5 | Lahore Qalandars | 10 | 5 | 5 | 0 | 10 | −0.589 |
| 6 | Quetta Gladiators | 10 | 2 | 8 | 0 | 4 | −1.786 |

Source: ESPNcricinfo
- The top 4 teams qualified for the playoffs
- advanced to Qualifier
- advanced to Eliminator 1

== Statistics ==
=== Most runs ===
| Rank | Name | Innings | Runs | High score |
|---|---|---|---|---|
| 1 | Mohammad Rizwan | 12 | 500 | 82 not out |
| 2 | Sohaib Maqsood | 12 | 428 | 65 not out |
| 3 | Shan Masood | 7 | 209 | 73 |
| 4 | Rilee Rossouw | 12 | 177 | 50 |
| 5 | James Vince | 5 | 174 | 84 |

- Source: ESPNcricinfo

=== Most wickets ===
| Rank | Name | Matches | Wickets | Best bowling |
|---|---|---|---|---|
| 1 | Shahnawaz Dahani | 11 | 20 | 4/5 |
| 2 | Imran Tahir | 7 | 13 | 3/7 |
| 3 | Imran khan | 7 | 12 | 3/24 |
| 4 | Blessing Muzarabani | 6 | 10 | 3/31 |
| 5 | Sohail Tanvir | 8 | 5 | 3/17 |

- Source: ESPNcricinfo

== See also ==
- 2021 Pakistan Super League squads
