= Khel Deewano Ka =

2019 Pakistan Super League official anthem

Promotional single by various artists
- Language: Urdu
- Released: 18 January 2019
- Genre: Stadium anthem
- Length: 3:51
- Songwriter: Shuja Haider
- Producer: Shuja Haider

Pakistan Super League anthems chronology
"Dil Se Jaan Laga De" (2018)	"Khel Deewano Ka" (2019)	"Tayyar Hain" (2020)

"Khel Deewano Ka" (Urdu: کھیل دیوانوں کا, lit. 'A Game for the Lovers') is a 2019 song, written by Shuja Haider and performed by Fawad Khan, with rap by Young Desi. It served as the official anthem of the fourth season of the Pakistan Super League.

== Background and release ==
On 29 November 2018, PSL officially hinted at the making of new anthem through the hashtag #KhelDeewanoKa. It was reported on 20 December that the anthem would be produced by Shuja Haider, while Fawad Khan would sing it and Young Desi's rap would also be featured. Khan previously represented the team Islamabad United for three seasons, and would not serve as the team's ambassador for the fourth season. Haider further confirmed to The Express Tribune that he has previously also collaborated for other cricket songs, but for "the first time" he was "composing" and had "penned" the PSL anthem.

The music video for the anthem was released on 18 January, after an announcement on previous day. Fawad Khan and Young Desi also performed on this anthem at the opening ceremony on 14 February in the Dubai International Stadium, and at the closing ceremony on 17 March in the National Stadium, Karachi.

== Reception ==
In a review in The News, Maheen Sabeeh called that the anthem is "somewhat catchy", but that Fawad Khan "sounds overproduced" and she wanted "more of Young Desi". Rafay Mahmood wrote in The Express Tribune that the anthem is "groovy", "fast, full of energy", and "entertaining". Dawn Images noted that "the video's a fun one" but the anthem misses "a little oomph factor". Another reviewer in Dawn noted that although it may have "foot-tapping rhythm", its video could not have "struck paydirt" and its "pedestrian lyrics" are "quite a letdown". Ihtisham Ul Haq called it "sooo boring". Daily Times reported that the anthem was "receiving mixed reviews on social media", while Express News reported that it failed to impress the audience.

Upon its release, journalist Arfa Feroz conducted a poll on Twitter, in which the anthem received only 9.1% of the vote from a competition of the three previous PSL anthems performed by Ali Zafar. Zafar revealed to Geo News that he could not be able to perform in the fourth season due to his busy schedule, though he showed appreciation towards participation of other artists.

Years later, in 2023, journalist Faizan Lakhani labeled it his "favourite PSL anthem of all time", while Zainab Sabir Mir collected the fan response and noted that the anthem seemingly "captured the PSL spirit with its catchy music". In 2025, Ahmer Naqvi of Dunya Digital praised Fawad Khan and the song for having "instantly recognisable catchphrase in its chorus", however, called Young Desi's inclusion to be not making sense musically. In 2026, Ali A. Rizvi of The Jungle Today called it a "brave misfire" experiment which left "the song unfocused in its genre".

== See also ==
External videos
- Music video on YouTube
- BTS 1 on Facebook.
- BTS 2 on YouTube
- Opening ceremony performance on YouTube

- List of Pakistan Super League anthems
