= Dil Se Jaan Laga De =

2018 Pakistan Super League official anthem

- Anthem cover

Promotional single by Ali Zafar
- Language: Urdu
- Released: January 2018
- Recorded: 2017
- Studio: Lightingale
- Genre: Stadium anthem
- Length: 3:26 (audio); 3:24 (music video)
- Label: Silent Roar Productions; HBL Pakistan
- Songwriter: Ali Zafar
- Producer: Shani Arshad

Pakistan Super League anthems chronology
"Ab Khel Jamay Ga" (2017)	"Dil Se Jaan Laga De" (2018)	"Khel Deewano Ka" (2019)

"Dil Se Jaan Laga De" (Urdu: دل سے جان لگا دے, lit. 'Put your heart in it') is a 2018 song, written and performed by Ali Zafar and released by HBL Pakistan. It served as the official anthem of the third season of the Pakistan Super League.

Zafar collaborated with the PSL for the third consecutive time, and the anthem's theme was aimed to celebrate the moments of cricket. Its music video, featuring a number of players from the Pakistan cricket team, was released on the same day when the team topped the ICC Men's T20I Team Rankings.

== Background and release ==
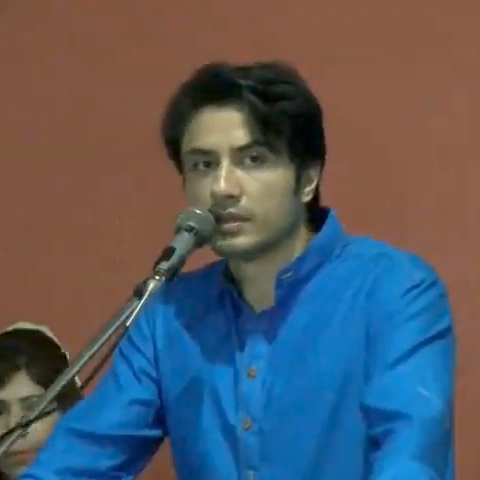
Zafar in 2019

In December 2017, Ali Zafar and the PSL started hinting a new anthem, and announced the hashtag #DilSeJaanLagaDe. Zafar expressed excitement at performing the league's official anthem for the third consecutive time and noted the challenge of surpassing the reception of last year's anthem. He described the process of his creativity by calling "Ab Khel Ke Dikha" as introductory, "Ab Khel Jamay Ga" as a dream, and this song a celebration of achieving that dream. According to Maheen Sabeeh of The News, the anthem lyrically represents the moments during the game and the memories long after, while the pop fused track features electro influences.

The anthem's music video was released on 28 January 2018 by HBL Pakistan, the same day the Pakistani cricket team reached the top spot in ICC Men's T20I Team Rankings. It features players, including Junaid Khan, Shahid Afridi, Misbah-ul-Haq, Umar Gul, Fakhar Zaman, Umar Amin, Babar Azam, Rumman Raees, Usman Shinwari, Faheem Ashraf, Amad Butt, Ramiz Raja, Shoaib Malik, and Ahmad Shahzad.

Zafar then also performed at the tournament's opening ceremony on 22 February in the Dubai International Stadium, and at the closing ceremony on 25 March in the National Stadium, Karachi.

== Reception and legacy ==
Dawn Images said its melody to be inspired by Coldplay, and said, "another tune we think we're going to have on repeat". The Express Tribune referred to Zafar and his anthems as "voice and soul" of the league, respectively. Asfia Afzal of Business Recorder said that the anthem "delves into the nostalgia" and "reminisces" in the national "cricket glory". Geo News criticized the absence of then national cricket team captain Sarfaraz Ahmed from the video. Darakhshan Anjum of RS-Tech said that "It seems that" Zafar "has begun this" anthem "from where he left the last one", as it has "left the public mesmerized." Maheen Sabeeh of The News International said that it has "a big, incredibly catchy sing-along chorus" and that impressively it "doesn't encourage aggression".

Later in 2024, Zafar returned to the PSL and performed this anthem at the opening ceremony, along with his two previous anthems. Journalist Arfa Feroz noted that these three were the "best PSL songs" in the legacy. In 2025, Ahmer Naqvi acknowledged in Dunya Digital that Zafar had the "most successful and popular PSL anthems" using "the power of the non-verbal chorus", however, called off his "repetition of words and themes". In 2026, Ali A. Rizvi of The Jungle Today called it a "fine" anthem, which is "perfectly competent" with "recycled" energy but "thoroughly forgettable".

== See also ==
External media

Audio
- Audio on SoundCloud

Video
- Music video on YouTube
- Opening ceremony performance on YouTube

- List of Pakistan Super League anthems
- Ali Zafar discography
