= NA-155 Lodhran-II =

Constituency of the National Assembly of Pakistan

- Constituency for the National Assembly of Pakistan
- Region: Lodhran Tehsil and Dunyapur Tehsil (partly) of Lodhran District
- Electorate: 556,557

Current constituency
- Party: Pakistan Muslim League (N)
- Member: Siddique Khan Baloch
- Created from: NA-154 Lodhran-I

NA-155 Lodhran-II (این اے-155، لودهراں-2) is a constituency for the National Assembly of Pakistan. It mainly comprises the Lodhran Tehsil along with some areas of the Dunyapur Tehsil.

== Election 2002 ==
General elections were held on 10 October 2002. Nawab Aman Ullah Khan of PML-Q won by 94,651 votes.

General election 2002: NA-154 Lodhran-I
Party	Candidate	Votes	%	±%
PML(Q)	Nawab Aman Ullah Khan	94,651	54.68	
PPP	Mirza Muhammad Nasir Baig	76,939	44.44	
Others	Others (three candidates)	1,525	0.88	
Turnout		176,802	54.32	
Total valid votes		173,115	97.92	
Rejected ballots		3,687	2.08	
Majority		47,712	10.24	
Registered electors		325,493		

== Election 2008 ==
General elections were held on 18 February 2008. Muhammad Siddique Khan Baloch of PML-Q won by 81,983 votes.

General election 2008: NA-154 Lodhran-I
Party	Candidate	Votes	%	±%
PML(Q)	Siddique Khan Baloch	81,983	48.52	
PPP	Mirza Muhammad Nasir Baig	79,611	47.11	
PML(N)	Muhammad Tahir Ameer Ghroi	6,508	3.85	
MQM	Muhammad Tufail Thakar	884	0.52	
Turnout		172,769	66.33	
Total valid votes		168,986	97.81	
Rejected ballots		3,783	2.19	
Majority		2,372	1.41	
Registered electors		260,489		
PML(Q) hold				

== Election 2013 ==
General elections were held on 11 May 2013. Muhammad Siddique Khan Baloch (independent candidate) won by securing 86,177 votes and became the member of National Assembly. Jahangeer Khan Tareen (Pakistan Tehreek-e-Insaf) got 72,089 votes. Syed Muhammad Rafi Ud Din Bukhari (PML N) was third with 45,406 votes.

General election 2013: NA-154 Lodhran-I
Party	Candidate	Votes	%	±%
Independent	Siddique Khan Baloch	86,177	38.03	
PTI	Jahangir Tareen	75,955	33.52	
PML(N)	Syed Rafi Uddin	45,634	20.14	
PPP	Mirza Muhammad Nasir Baig	11,173	4.93	
Others	Others (seventeen candidates)	7,680	3.38	
Turnout		236,523	63.90	
Total valid votes		226,619	95.81	
Rejected ballots		9,904	4.19	
Majority		10,222	4.51	
Registered electors		370,150		
PML(N) gain from PML(Q)				

== By-election 2015 ==
A by-election was held in this constituency after the disqualification of Muhammad Siddique Khan Baloch due to rigging allegations.

Pakistan Tehreek-e-Insaf Secretary General Jahangir Tareen won this seat with 138719 votes, while PML-N's Siddique Khan Baloch came second with 99,933 votes.

NA-154 bye-election 2015
Party	Candidate	Votes	%
PTI	Jahangir Tareen	138,719	56.05
PML(N)	Siddique Khan Baloch	99,933	40.38
PPP	Rana Sumair Mumtaz Noon	1,910	0.77
Others	Others	6,923	2.80
Valid ballots		247,485	98.72
Rejected ballots		3,215	1.28
Turnout		250,700	59.80
Majority		38,786	15.67
PTI gain from Independent			

== By-election 2018 ==
Following the disqualification of Jehangir Khan Tareen, Secretary General of Pakistan Tehreek-e-Insaf was denotified of his seat. A subsequent by-election was held on February 12.

Iqbal Shah of Pakistan Muslim League (N) won this bye-election with over 113,850 votes. This was seen as a major upset for the Pakistan Tehreek-e-Insaf, as Lodhran had been seen as one of their strongholds after the 2015 by-election.

NA-154 by-election 2018
Party	Candidate	Votes	%
PML(N)	Muhammad Iqbal Shah	113,827	51.44
PTI	Ali Tareen	91,871	39.58
Independent	Malik Azhar Ahmed Sandila	11,494	5.19
Others	Others	8,374	3.79
Valid ballots		221,266	98.53
Rejected ballots		3,305	1.47
Turnout		224,571	52.10
Majority		26,256	11.86
PML(N) gain from PTI			

== Election 2018 ==
General elections were held on 25 July 2018.

General election 2018: NA-161 Lodhran-II
Party	Candidate	Votes	%	±%
PTI	Mian Muhammad Shafiq	121,300	46.86	▲7.28
PML(N)	Siddique Khan Baloch	116,093	44.85	▼6.59
Others	Others (thirteen candidates)	21,455	8.29	
Turnout		263,772	57.73	▲5.63
Total valid votes		258,848	98.13	▼0.40
Rejected ballots		4,924	1.87	▲0.40
Majority		5,207	2.01	▲13.87
Registered electors		456,927		
PTI gain from PML(N)		Swing	▲6.93	

== Election 2024 ==
General elections were held on 8 February 2024. Siddique Khan Baloch won the election with 117,687 votes.

General election 2024: NA-155 Lodhran-II
Party	Candidate	Votes	%	±%
PML(N)	Siddique Khan Baloch	117,687	40.89	▼3.96
IPP	Jahangir Tareen	71,131	24.71	
PTI	Muhammad Qasim (Note: Filed nomination papers as PTI candidate but ECP allowed him to run as an Independent)	53,174	18.47	▼28.39
Others	Others (fourteen candidates)	45,824	15.92	
Turnout		295,436	53.08	▼4.65
Total valid votes		287,816	97.42	
Rejected ballots		7,620	2.58	
Majority		46,556	16.18	
Registered electors		556,557		
PML(N) gain from PTI				

== See also ==
- NA-154 Lodhran-I
- NA-156 Vehari-I
