= Ali Tareen =

Pakistani businessman and politician (born 1988)

Ali Khan Tareen
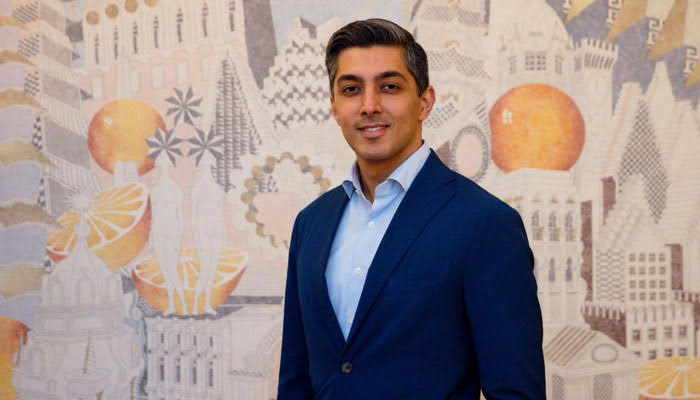
- Ali Tareen in 2024
- Born: November 14, 1988 (age 37); Lahore, Punjab, Pakistan
- Education: University of Oxford (MBA)
- Occupations: Businessman, politician
- Known for: Owner of Multan Sultans, agricultural reforms, social initiatives
- Spouse: Bisma Ahmed
- Father: Jahangir Tareen

Ali Khan Tareen (born 14 November 1988) is a Pakistani businessman, politician, and cricket patron. He owned the Pakistan Super League (PSL) franchise Multan Sultans until 2025.

== Early life and education ==
Ali Tareen was born in Lahore to Jahangir Khan Tareen and Amina Tareen. He has three sisters: Seher, Marium and Meher. Tareen earned an Executive MBA from the University of Oxford. During his student years, he participated in youth and community organisations including the Young Social Reformers, Youth Parliament, Society for National Education and the Karachi Youth Initiative. In 2014, he hosted a radio programme, Sab ka Saath, on FM 100 dedicated to visually impaired individuals.

== Career ==
=== Business ventures ===
Ali Tareen oversees aspects of his family's agricultural and sugar enterprises, including the JDW Group. He has been involved in initiatives to introduce modern farming techniques and promote sustainable agricultural practices with his business in South Punjab.

In 2018, Tareen co-acquired the PSL franchise Multan Sultans with his uncle, Alamgir Khan Tareen. After Alamgir Tareen's passing in 2023, Ali became the principal owner of the team. In April 2025, he publicly expressed concern over the PSL's revised financial model, calling for more sustainable franchise terms. Later that year, he also criticised the league's decision to repeatedly select singer Ali Zafar for the official PSL anthem, urging greater representation of new artists.

=== Political career ===
Following his father's disqualification from the National Assembly in 2017, Ali Tareen contested the by-election for the NA-155 Lodhran-II constituency as a candidate of the Pakistan Tehreek-e-Insaf (PTI). He was defeated by Muhammad Iqbal Shah of the Pakistan Muslim League-Nawaz (PML-N).

2018 Lodhran by-election: NA-155 (Lodhran-II)
Party	Candidate	Votes	%	±%
PML(N)	Muhammad Iqbal Shah	113,542	49.09	▲7.57
PTI	Ali Khan Tareen	85,933	37.14	▼12.38
TLP	Muhammad Yaqoob Sheikh	10,227	4.42	▲4.42
Independent	Ahmad Khan Baloch	9,222	3.99	▼1.15
Others	Others (six candidates)	12,560	5.36	
Turnout		231,484	52.99	▲3.19
Rejected ballots		2,744	1.18	
Majority		27,609	11.95	
Registered electors		436,861		
PML(N) gain from		Swing	N/A	

^{†}By-election held following the disqualification of Jahangir Khan Tareen by the Supreme Court of Pakistan in December 2017.

=== Social initiatives ===
Tareen has launched several initiatives to promote cricket and education in South Punjab. In 2019, he established the Ali Tareen Cricket Academy in Lodhran to provide training facilities for emerging players from rural areas. In 2023, he introduced a scholarship programme enabling students from the region to pursue graduate studies at the University of Oxford.

== Personal life ==
Ali Tareen is married to Bisma Ahmad, and the couple has one child. He maintains an active presence on social media, particularly on Twitter, where he frequently discusses sports and social issues.
