= Ab Khel Ke Dikha =

2016 Pakistan Super League official anthem

Promotional single by Ali Zafar
- Language: Urdu
- Released: 20 September 2015
- Recorded: 2015
- Studio: Lightingale
- Genre: Stadium anthem
- Length: 4:34; 4:00 (audio remix); 2:48 (music video)
- Label: HBL Pakistan
- Songwriter: Ali Zafar
- Producer: Ali Zafar

Pakistan Super League anthems chronology
| "Ab Khel Ke Dikha" (2015) | "Ab Khel Jamay Ga" (2017) |

"Ab Khel Ke Dikha" (Note: Urdu: اب کھیل کے دکھا, lit. 'Show Me How You Play') is a 2015 song, written and performed by Ali Zafar and released by HBL Pakistan. It served as the official anthem of the first season of the Pakistan Super League in 2016.

The anthem features a non-verbal chorus, and introduced a trumpet tune that became the league's identity in subsequent years. Zafar had previously collaborated with the Pakistan Cricket Board (PCB) for anthems in 2011 as well, and he also collaborated with the PSL in later years.

== Background and release ==
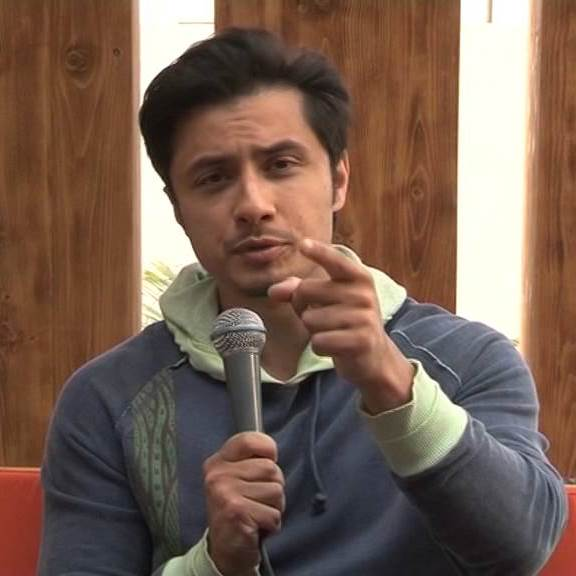
Zafar in 2015

Previously, Ali Zafar had collaborated with the PCB for the 2011 Cricket World Cup anthems, "Jazba" and "Duniya Hai Dilwalon Ki". In September 2015, it was announced that the PCB had again approached Zafar to create an anthem for the inaugural season of the PSL, running in February 2016. The anthem was premiered by Zafar at the PSL's logo launching ceremony in Lahore on 20 September 2015, while hashtag #AbKhelKeDikha was being used on the PSL's social media accounts to promote the tournament.

Zafar wrote, composed, sang, and produced the song in his recently established studio named Lightingale, and recorded a chorus of 25 male and female backing vocalists. He said that he kept a "sort of international feel" in the song blended with "a very Pakistani flavour", so that "it can be hummed by any listener", and that its lyrics reflect the "cricketers, celebrities and entertainment blending together".

On 4 February 2016, the music video for the remix of song was released by HBL Pakistan, featuring synth horns and anthemic drums. Zafar then also performed at the PSL opening ceremony at Dubai International Stadium the same evening as a closing act before the fireworks.

== Reception and legacy ==
Upon initial release, Sami Qahar of Dawn Aurora reviewed that the song was a "weak link in the campaign" with "cliché music and lyrics". Aamna Haider Isani called Zafar after his performance at the opening ceremony as "more than made up for mass appeal" in The News. Manjusha Radhakrishnan wrote in Gulf News that this "infectious" anthem would likely get someone "into the spirit of the game". After the tournament completed on 24 February 2016, another reviewer from Dawn Aurora Umair Kazi noted that the song "fared well" by complying "the song and dance rituals" of Pakistan, despite its music video which was filmed "around HBL landmarks and branches". Rahul Aijaz noted it as "a catchy number", but did not "live up to the hype".

In subsequent years, Annam Lodhi in Pakistan Today, Zohaib Ahmed Majeed in Dawn, and Rafay Mahmood in The Express Tribune appreciated that the anthem presented an IPL-inspired "trumpet" tune that became the league's identity. While Majeed called it a "killer anthem" in 2018, Mahmood noted in 2019 that it initially felt "annoying" just like Zafar's old song "Masty".

Later in 2024, Zafar returned to the PSL and performed this anthem at the opening ceremony as well, along with his "Ab Khel Jamay Ga" and "Dil Se Jaan Laga De". Journalist Arfa Feroz noted that these three were the "best PSL songs" in the legacy, while Manahil Tahira wrote in The Express Tribune that these "carried the oomph" of a "typical sports anthem". In 2025, Ahmer Naqvi acknowledged in Dunya Digital that Zafar had used "the power of the non-verbal chorus" and the anthem became "immediately popular". In 2026, Ali A. Rizvi of The Jungle Today noted that the anthem had a "rare quality" of cricket sound rather than "a vague concept of winning", and called it a "lightning-in-a-bottle" attempt.

== See also ==
External media

Audio
- "Ab Khel Ke Dikha" (Audio) on SoundCloud
- "Ab Khel Ke Dikha" (Remix) on SoundCloud

Video
- Music video on Facebook

- List of Pakistan Super League anthems
- Ali Zafar discography
