= Jahangir Tareen =

Pakistani politician and businessman (born 1953)

- جہانگیر ترین
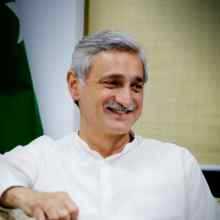

Member of the National Assembly of Pakistan
- In office 1 January 2016 – 15 December 2017
- Constituency: NA-155 Lodhran-II
- In office 16 November 2002 – January 2012
- Constituency: NA-174 Rahim Yar Khan-VI

Federal Minister for Industries and Production
- In office August 2004 – November 2007
- President: Pervez Musharraf
- Prime Minister: Shaukat Aziz

Advisor to the Chief Minister of Punjab (Pakistan) on Agriculture
- In office 2002–2004
- Chief Minister: Parvez Elahi

Secretary General PTI
- In office 2011–2019
- Chairman: Imran Khan

Personal details
- Born: Jahangir Khan Tareen; 4 July 1953 (age 73) Comilla, East Bengal, Pakistan
- Other political affiliations: IPP (2023-2024); PTI (2011–2019); PML(F) (2008–2011); PML(Q) (2002–2007); PMLN (1997–2002)
- Spouse: Amina Tareen (m. 1978)
- Children: 4 (including Ali Tareen)
- Parent(s): Allah Nawaz Tareen (father); Zahida Tareen (mother)
- Relatives: Seemi Aizdi (sister); Alamgir Tareen (brother); Syed Hasan Mahmood (father in law); Makhdoom Syed Ahmed Mehmood (brother in law); Akhtar Abdur Rahman (uncle); Humayun Akhtar Khan (cousin); Haroon Akhtar Khan (cousin); Shaukat Tarin (cousin)
- Education: Forman Christian College; University of North Carolina
- Occupation: Politician; Businessman
- Office: Majority Shareholder & Executive Director of JDW Group; Chairman & Owner of JK Group
- Website: www.jahangirktareen.com

Jahangir Khan Tareen (Note: Urdu: جہانگیر خان ترین) (born 4 July 1953) is a Pakistani politician and businessman who is the founder of JDW Group, a conglomerate involved in sugar production, ethanol, power generation, sugarcane farming, and aircraft operations. He is also chairman and owner of JK Group, which operates in sugar and related products, milk production, power generation, agriculture and fruit production, and granite mining, and holds the PepsiCo Multan franchise as well as the PSL Multan Sultans franchise.

Tareen served as a member of the National Assembly of Pakistan on three occasions between 2002 and 2017. He joined Tehreek-e-Insaf in 2011 and served as its General Secretary until December 2017. He later launched the Istehkam-e-Pakistan Party (IPP) in June 2023, resigning in February 2024 upon losing his seat in the 2024 election.

== Early life and education ==
Tareen was born in Comilla, East Bengal, Pakistan, on 4 July 1953. His family was posted there at the time. They originally came from South Punjab near Multan and belonged to a Pashtun family of the Tareen tribe.

He graduated from Forman Christian College, Lahore in 1971 and received an MBA degree from the University of North Carolina, USA, in 1974.

He is an entrepreneur by profession and, prior to entering politics, he had also been a lecturer and a banker. He headed the Punjab Task Force on Agriculture from 1997 to 1999, Take Force also Members Sec Agri & Minister Agri Arshad Lodhi And Pesticides Secter Member Haji Muhammad Mansha Sipra under Shahbaz Sharif 1st CM Era and the Punjab Task Force on Wheat Procurement and Marketing from 2001 to 2002.

In 2017, According to the Parliamentarians' Tax Directory for 2017, he paid over 0.3 Million USD per year in personal income tax.

According to his publicly available tax returns and asset declarations, Tareen's net worth is estimated at approximately ₨2.3 billion. Additionally, his children (sons and daughters) hold a collective net worth of approximately ₨ 3 billion PKR. His business interests and companies reportedly (as per 2023) maintain an annual turnover of approximately US$150 million.

== Career ==
In an interview with Newsweek Pakistan, Tareen said he "doesn't belong to a political family, but he married into one". He married Amina Tareen, the daughter of Syed Hasan Mahmood and the sister of Makhdoom Ahmed Mehmood, both having been seasoned politicians, especially influential, in the Rahim Yar Khan District of Punjab, where the family has "considerable, spiritual and feudal influence."

He began his political career in 2002 after he was elected to the National Assembly in the 2002 Pakistani general elections from Constituency NA-195 on the ticket of Pakistan Muslim League (Q).

He served as special adviser on agriculture and social sector initiatives to then Chief Minister of Punjab Chaudhry Pervaiz Elahi. In August 2004, he was inducted into the federal cabinet and was made Federal Minister for Industries and Production in the Shaukat Aziz ministry where he remained until 2007. His sugar mills flourished during his tenure as Minister for Industries.

In the 2008 Pakistani general election, Tareen was re-elected as a member of the National Assembly for the second time from Constituency NA-195 on the seat of Pakistan Muslim League (F).

He was the parliamentary leader of PML-F in the National Assembly. Later, he formed a forward block known as "Tareen's group" which comprised several seasoned politicians. In 2011, he said he was to launch his own political party consisting of politicians free from corruption charges. He later resigned from the National Assembly and in November 2011, joined Pakistan Tehreek-e-Insaf along with a number of associates, saying that his vision was similar to PTI's.

In September 2013, Imran Khan appointed Tareen as the Secretary General of Pakistan Tehreek-e-Insaf.

In the 2013 Pakistani general election, Tareen ran for a seat on the National Assembly from Constituency NA-154 (Lodhran) on the seat of PTI, but was unsuccessful. Where has heavily invested.

In the 2015 by-elections, he was re-elected as a member of the National Assembly for the third time from Constituency NA-154 (Lodhran) on the seat of PTI. The seat became vacant after Tareen filed a petition in which he made accusations of irregularities in the constituency during the 2013 general election.

== Personal life ==
Tareen's father, Allah Nawaz Tareen, was a police officer who retired as a Deputy Inspector General. His mother, Zahida Khan Tareen, died in 2004. His younger brother, Alamgir Tareen, a businessman who operated one of the largest water purification plants in the country and who was also the founder and owner of the Multan Sultans franchise in the Pakistan Super League, died by suicide in 2023, at the age of 63.

His paternal cousin, Shaukat Tarin, is a banker who has served as the country's Finance Minister twice, including under Imran Khan from 2021 – 2022.

His maternal cousins include Humayun Akhtar Khan and Haroon Akhtar Khan, both influential politicians and the sons of General Akhtar Abdur Rahman, who served as the DG-ISI under Zia-ul-Haq.

== Controversies ==
In 2016, PML-N filed a reference to disqualify Tareen from his National Assembly seat for "submitting false statements with the Election Commission of Pakistan". In 2017, ECP rejected disqualification references against Tareen.

On 15 December 2017, the Supreme Court of Pakistan disqualified Tareen from serving as a member of parliament under Article 62(1)(f) of the Constitution due to dishonesty in financial declarations. It also noted that he had engaged in conduct that could have been prosecuted as insider trading, but he was protected from such prosecution due to a settlement with the Securities and Exchange Commission of Pakistan. A subsequent judgment held that disqualification under Article 62(1)(f) is for life, but Tareen claimed that this judgment did not apply in his case.

However, on 8 January 2023, the Supreme Court ruled that the lifetime disqualification was beyond the scope of Article 62(1)(f) and therefore, Tareen became eligible to contest the 2024 elections.
