= 2021 Peshawar Zalmi season =

Overview of Peshawar Zalmi in 2021

Peshawar Zalmi
2021 season
- Coach: Daren Sammy
- Captain: Wahab Riaz
- PSL 2021: 3rd
- Most runs: Shoaib Malik (354)
- Most wickets: Wahab Riaz (18)

The Peshawar Zalmi (often abbreviated as PZ) is a franchise cricket team that represents Peshawar, Khyber Pakhtunkhwa, Pakistan in the Pakistan Super League (PSL). The franchise won the tournament in 2017. The team was coached by Daren Sammy, and captained by Wahab Riaz.

== Kit manufacturers and sponsors ==
Kit manufacturer	Shirt sponsor (chest)	Shirt sponsor (back)	Chest branding	Sleeve branding
Zalmi in-house	Haier	TCL	Huawei	McDonald's Pakistan, Oppo, Airlink

Playing kit

== Season standings ==
=== Points table ===
Pos	Team	Pld	W	L	NR	Pts	NRR
1	Islamabad United (3rd)	10	8	2	0	16	0.859
2	Multan Sultans (C)	10	5	5	0	10	1.050
3	Peshawar Zalmi (R)	10	5	5	0	10	0.586
4	Karachi Kings (4th)	10	5	5	0	10	−0.115
5	Lahore Qalandars	10	5	5	0	10	−0.589
6	Quetta Gladiators	10	2	8	0	4	−1.786

Source: ESPNcricinfo
- The top 4 teams qualified for the playoffs
- advanced to Qualifier
- advanced to Eliminator 1

== League fixtures ==
Match 2
21 February 2021
14:00 (D/N)
Scorecard

Peshawar Zalmi; 140/6 (20 overs)	v	Lahore Qalandars; 143/6 (18.3 overs)
Ravi Bopara 50 (44); Shaheen Afridi 3/14 (4 overs)		Mohammad Hafeez 33* (26); Saqib Mahmood 2/22 (4 overs)

Lahore Qalandars won by 4 wickets
National Stadium, Karachi
Umpires: Shozab Raza (Pak) and Rashid Riaz (Pak)
Player of the match: Shaheen Afridi (Lahore Qalandars)

- Lahore Qalandars won the toss and elected to field.

Match 5
23 February 2021
19:00 (N)
Scorecard

Multan Sultans; 193/4 (20 overs)	v	Peshawar Zalmi; 197/4 (19 overs)
James Vince 84 (55); Saqib Mahmood 2/36 (4 overs)		Tom Kohler-Cadmore 53 (32); Shahnawaz Dahani 2/44 (4 overs)

Peshawar Zalmi won by 6 wickets
National Stadium, Karachi
Umpires: Richard Illingworth (Eng) and Aleem Dar (Pak)
Player of the match: Tom Kohler-Cadmore (Peshawar Zalmi)

- Peshawar Zalmi won the toss and elected to field.

Match 8
26 February 2021
20:00 (N)
Scorecard

Quetta Gladiators; 198/7 (20 overs)	v	Peshawar Zalmi; 202/7 (19.3 overs)
Sarfaraz Ahmed 81 (40); Saqib Mahmood 3/34 (4 overs)		Haider Ali 50 (29); Dale Steyn 2/44 (4 overs)

Peshawar Zalmi won by 3 wickets
National Stadium, Karachi
Umpires: Richard Illingworth (Eng) and Asif Yaqoob (Pak)
Player of the match: Haider Ali (Peshawar Zalmi)

- Peshawar Zalmi won the toss and elected to field.

Match 10
27 February 2021
19:00 (N)
Scorecard

Islamabad United; 118 (17.1 overs)	v	Peshawar Zalmi; 122/4 (17.1 overs)
Alex Hales 41 (27); Wahab Riaz 4/17 (4 overs)		Tom Kohler-Cadmore 46 (46); Hasan Ali 2/14 (4 overs)

Peshawar Zalmi won by 6 wickets
National Stadium, Karachi
Umpires: Shozab Raza (Pak) and Asif Yaqoob (Pak)
Player of the match: Wahab Riaz (Peshawar Zalmi)

- Peshawar Zalmi won the toss and elected to field.

Match 13
3 March 2021
14:00 (D/N)
Scorecard

Peshawar Zalmi; 188/5 (20 overs)	v	Karachi Kings; 191/4 (19.3 overs)
Ravi Bopara 58* (40); Abbas Afridi 2/27 (4 overs)		Babar Azam 77* (47); Saqib Mahmood 2/41 (4 overs)

Karachi Kings won by 6 wickets
National Stadium, Karachi
Umpires: Aleem Dar (Pak) and Imran Javed (Pak)
Player of the match: Mohammad Nabi (Karachi Kings)

- Karachi Kings won the toss and elected to field.

Match 17
10 June 2021
23:00 (N)
Scorecard

Lahore Qalandars; 170/8 (20 overs)	v	Peshawar Zalmi; 160/8 (20 overs)
Tim David 64* (36); Fabian Allen 2/36 (3 overs)		Shoaib Malik 73 (48); Rashid Khan 5/20 (4 overs)

Lahore Qalandars won by 10 runs
Sheikh Zayed Cricket Stadium, Abu Dhabi
Umpires: Rashid Riaz (Pak) and Asif Yaqoob (Pak)
Player of the match: Rashid Khan (Lahore Qalandars)

- Peshawar Zalmi won the toss and elected to field.

Match 19
12 June 2021
21:00 (N)
Scorecard

Peshawar Zalmi; 197/5 (20 overs)	v	Quetta Gladiators; 136/9 (20 overs)
David Miller 73 (46); Mohammad Nawaz 2/33 (4 overs)		Sarfaraz Ahmed 36* (28); Mohammad Irfan 3/27 (4 overs)

Peshawar Zalmi won by 61 runs
Sheikh Zayed Cricket Stadium, Abu Dhabi
Umpires: Ahsan Raza (Pak) and Shozab Raza (Pak)
Player of the match: David Miller (Peshawar Zalmi)

- Quetta Gladiators won the toss and elected to field.
- Saim Ayub replaced Faf du Plessis as a concussion substitute for Quetta Gladiators.

Match 21
13 June 2021
23:00 (N)
Scorecard

Peshawar Zalmi; 166/7 (20 overs)	v	Multan Sultans; 167/2 (16.3 overs)
Sherfane Rutherford 56 (40); Shahnawaz Dahani 4/31 (4 overs)		Mohammad Rizwan 82* (56); Mohammad Irfan 1/24 (4 overs)

Multan Sultans won by 8 wickets
Sheikh Zayed Cricket Stadium, Abu Dhabi
Umpires: Aleem Dar (Pak) and Ahsan Raza (Pak)
Player of the match: Shahnawaz Dahani (Multan Sultans)

- Multan Sultans won the toss and elected to field.

Match 24
15 June 2021
23:00 (N)
Scorecard

Karachi Kings; 108/9 (20 overs)	v	Peshawar Zalmi; 109/4 (11 overs)
Abbas Afridi 27* (18); Abrar Ahmed 3/14 (4 overs)		Hazratullah Zazai 63 (26); Imad Wasim 2/2 (2 overs)

Peshawar Zalmi won by 6 wickets
Sheikh Zayed Cricket Stadium, Abu Dhabi
Umpires: Ahsan Raza (Pak) and Shozab Raza (Pak)
Player of the match: Hazratullah Zazai (Peshawar Zalmi)

- Peshawar Zalmi won the toss and elected to field.

Match 26
17 June 2021
18:00 (D/N)
Scorecard

Islamabad United; 247/2 (20 overs)	v	Peshawar Zalmi; 232/6 (20 overs)
Usman Khawaja 105* (56); Shoaib Malik 1/14 (2 overs)		Shoaib Malik 68 (36); Akif Javed 3/43 (4 overs)

Islamabad United won by 15 runs
Sheikh Zayed Cricket Stadium, Abu Dhabi
Umpires: Shozab Raza (Pak) and Rashid Riaz (Pak)
Player of the match: Usman Khawaja (Islamabad United)

- Peshawar Zalmi won the toss and elected to field.

== Playoffs ==
=== Eliminator 1 ===
Match 32
21 June 2021
23:00 (N)
Scorecard

Karachi Kings; 175/7 (20 overs)	v	Peshawar Zalmi; 176/5 (19.5 overs)
Babar Azam 53 (45); Mohammad Irfan 2/21 (4 overs)		Hazratullah Zazai 77 (38); Thisara Perera 2/10 (2 overs)

Peshawar Zalmi won by 5 wickets
Sheikh Zayed Cricket Stadium, Abu Dhabi
Umpires: Aleem Dar (Pak) and Shozab Raza (Pak)
Player of the match: Hazratullah Zazai (Peshawar Zalmi)

- Peshawar Zalmi won the toss and elected to field.

=== Eliminator 2 ===
Match 33
22 June 2021
21:00 (N)
Scorecard

Islamabad United; 174/9 (20 overs)	v	Peshawar Zalmi; 177/2 (16.5 overs)
Hasan Ali 45 (16); Wahab Riaz 2/35 (4 overs)		Hazratullah Zazai 66 (44); Mohammad Wasim 1/32 (3 overs)

Peshawar Zalmi won by 8 wickets
Sheikh Zayed Cricket Stadium, Abu Dhabi
Umpires: Aleem Dar (Pak) and Asif Yaqoob (Pak)
Player of the match: Hazratullah Zazai (Peshawar Zalmi)

- Peshawar Zalmi won the toss and elected to field.

=== Final ===
Match 34
24 June 2021
21:00 (N)
Scorecard

Multan Sultans; 206/4 (20 overs)	v	Peshawar Zalmi; 159/9 (20 overs)
Sohaib Maqsood 65* (35); Sameen Gul 2/26 (4 overs)		Shoaib Malik 48 (28); Imran Tahir 3/33 (4 overs)

Multan Sultans won by 47 runs
Sheikh Zayed Cricket Stadium, Abu Dhabi
Umpires: Aleem Dar (Pak) and Ahsan Raza (Pak)
Player of the match: Sohaib Maqsood (Multan Sultans)

- Peshawar Zalmi won the toss and elected to field.
