= Alamgir Tareen =

Pakistani businessman (1959/1960 – 2023)

Alamgir Khan Tareen
- عالمگیر خان ترین
- Born: 5 November 1959; Multan, West Pakistan, Pakistan
- Died: 6 July 2023 (aged 63); Lahore, Punjab, Pakistan
- Education: University of California, Berkeley; Yale University
- Occupation: Businessman
- Known for: Owner of Multan Sultans
- Height: 1.78 m (5 ft 10 in)
- Family: Jahangir Tareen (brother); Seemi Aizdi (sister); Humayun Akhtar Khan (cousin); Haroon Akhtar Khan (cousin); Ali Khan Tareen (nephew)

Alamgir Khan Tareen (5 November 1959 - 6 July 2023), or simply Alamgir Tareen, was a Pakistani businessman and founder of the Multan Sultans cricket team. He was the younger brother of politicians Seemi Aizdi and Jahangir Tareen and was a leading businessman in Multan. He was also the managing director of Shamim and Company (Pvt) Ltd, which is the official bottler and franchise of PepsiCo for Multan and the southern Punjab region.

== Early life and career ==
Alamgir Khan Tareen was born on 5 November 1959 in Multan, Pakistan, to father Allah Nawaz Tareen, a Deputy Inspector General who worked in the police, and mother Zahida Khan Tareen. He was the youngest of four siblings, having two older sisters, Seemi Aizdi and Samina Tareen, and an older brother, Jahangir Tareen. He belonged to a Pashtun family of the Tareen tribe and was a leading businessman in Multan.

Tareen served as the managing director of Shamim and Company (Pvt) Ltd, which is the official bottler and franchise of PepsiCo for Multan and the rest of south Punjab. He did his bachelor's degree from the University of California, Berkeley, and later completed his master's degree from Yale.

== Multan Sultans ==
Tareen acquired the Multan Sultans franchise in 2018 along with his nephew Ali Tareen, the son of influential Pakistani businessman and politician, Jahangir Tareen.

== Death ==
Alamgir Tareen died by suicide at his home in Lahore on 6 July 2023, at the age of 63, after battling with a prolonged illness.

== Personal life ==
Tareen was born and raised in the city of Multan and lived in Karachi for some time, before eventually settling in Lahore. At the time of his death, he was unmarried and had no children but was engaged and set to marry in December 2023.
