= Mian Muhammad Shafiq =

Pakistani politician

Member of the National Assembly of Pakistan
- In office 13 August 2018 – 25 January 2023
- Constituency: NA-161 (Lodhran-II)

Personal details
- Party: PTI (2018-present)
- Other political affiliations: PPP (2008-2018)

Mian Muhammad Shafiq Arain (میاں محمد شفیق) is a Pakistani politician who had been a member of the National Assembly of Pakistan from August 2018 till January 2023.

== Early life and education ==
He was born on 18 November 1956 in Dunyapur Tehsil.

He graduated in 1977 from the Government Emerson College and holds a Bachelor of Arts degree.

== Political career ==
He was elected to the Provincial Assembly of the Punjab from Constituency PP-207 (Lodhran-I) as a candidate of Pakistan Peoples Party (PPP) in the 2008 Pakistani general election. He received 30,506 votes and defeated Muhammad Aamir Iqbal Shah.

He was elected to the National Assembly of Pakistan from Constituency NA-161 (Lodhran-II) as a candidate of Pakistan Tehreek-e-Insaf in the 2018 Pakistani general election.

In November 2018, he was appointed as Federal Parliamentary Secretary for Communications.

== More reading ==
- List of members of the 15th National Assembly of Pakistan
