= Syed Hasan Mahmood =

- Born: 27 November 1922; Bahawalpur, Punjab, British India
- Died: 25 August 1986 (aged 63); New York, United States
- Occupations: Politician, cricket administrator, cricket patron, cricketer

Makhdoomzada Syed Hasan Mahmood (27 November 1922 – 25 August 1986) was a Pakistani politician, cricket patron, cricket administrator and first-class cricketer who served as the first elected Chief Minister of Bahawalpur Province and the Leader of the Opposition in the Provincial Assembly of the Punjab from 1985 to 1986. He also served as Minister for Education and Health in Bahawalpur, as a member of the Constituent Assembly of Pakistan in 1951, as a member of the Provincial Assembly of West Pakistan from 1956 to 1958, and as a member of the Provincial Assembly of the Punjab in 1972–77 and 1985–88.

Mahmood played his only first-class match for a combined Bahawalpur and Karachi side against the touring Marylebone Cricket Club at Dring Stadium, Bahawalpur, in November 1951. Batting at number eight and captaining the side, he scored 4, and in MCC's second innings he dismissed Tom Graveney, finishing with 1 for 33 from 11 overs.

Although his playing career was brief, Mahmood became one of the most important patrons of early Pakistan cricket in Bahawalpur. He personally oversaw the construction of Dring Stadium, persuaded the Bahawalpur state to fund a modern multi-sport complex, and helped assemble a powerful Bahawalpur side featuring several of the country's leading cricketers, including Hanif Mohammad, Wazir Mohammad, Khan Mohammad, Imtiaz Ahmed, Alimuddin and Amir Elahi. Bahawalpur also served as Pakistan's training base before the 1954 tour of England, and Mahmood, as one of the vice-presidents of the Board of Control for Cricket in Pakistan, chaired the selection panel for that tour.

Mahmood also conceived the establishment of Sadiq Public School, Bahawalpur, for which the foundation stone was laid in 1953. He died in New York on 25 August 1986, aged 63.
