= Seemi Aizdi =

Pakistani politician

Seemi Ezdi

Member of the Senate of Pakistan
- In office December 2018 – March 2024
- President: Arif Alvi
- Prime Minister: Imran Khan
- Constituency: Punjab, Pakistan

Personal details
- Born: 1950 (age 75–76) Comilla, East Bengal, Pakistan
- Other party: PTI (2018-2023)
- Relatives: Jahangir Tareen (brother)

Seemi Aizdi is a Pakistani politician who was the member of the Senate of Pakistan from December 2018 to March 2024.

== Early life ==
She was born in Comilla, which at the time was part of East Bengal in Pakistan, but is now situated in Bangladesh.

== Political career ==
In May 2018, she paid Rs.100,000 to Pakistan Tehreek-e-Insaf (PTI) as an application fee for a ticket to contest the 2018 Pakistani general election from one of the national assembly constituencies of Islamabad Capital Territory (ICT). However, she was not allotted a ticket for any of the three ICT constituencies. Rather, she was accommodated in upcoming by-elections for the Senate of Pakistan and was elected senator from Punjab province on a reserved seat for women representing PTI. The election was held on 15 November 2018 between her and Saira Afzal Tarar of Pakistan Muslim League (N). PTI was criticized for promoting nepotism for her being sister of then PTI stalwart Jahangir Tareen. She served as a senator from December 2018 to March 2024. While serving as a senator, she chaired the committee on climate change. In this role, she advocated for making the China–Pakistan Economic Corridor more environmentally sustainable.

In March 2022, while her brother Jahangir Tareen was backing a no-confidence motion against Imran Khan, she publicly expressed her support for Khan.

She was among the PTI senators who proposed a resolution denouncing the May 9 riots and advocating for severe measures against those responsible for the violent acts on that day.
