= Ab Khel Jamay Ga =

2017 Pakistan Super League official anthem

Promotional single by Ali Zafar
- Language: Urdu
- Released: January 2017
- Recorded: 2016
- Studio: Lightingale
- Genre: Stadium anthem
- Length: 3:09 (audio); 3:21 (music video)
- Label: HBL Pakistan
- Songwriter: Ali Zafar

Pakistan Super League anthems chronology
"Ab Khel Ke Dikha" (2016)	"Ab Khel Jamay Ga" (2017)	"Dil Se Jaan Laga De" (2018)

"Ab Khel Jamay Ga" (Note: Urdu: اب کھیل جمے گا, lit. 'Now the Game will be Stronger') is a 2017 song, written and performed by Ali Zafar and released by HBL Pakistan. It served as the official anthem of the second season of the Pakistan Super League.

Zafar collaborated with the PSL for the second consecutive season. Also known as "Seeti Bajaygi", (Note: Urdu: سیٹی بجے گی, lit. 'The whistle will blow') the song's theme was aimed at the return of cricket in Pakistan, and is called by numerous publications over the years as the best PSL anthem and a fan-favourite since its release.

== Background and release ==
In late-December 2016, it was announced that Ali Zafar was chosen again by the Pakistan Cricket Board to write, compose, and sing the anthem for PSL season II. The tournament news was promoted by the hashtag #AbKhelJamayGa on social media accounts of the PSL.

Zafar said that "it was just the beginning" at the time of "Ab Khel Ke Dikha" in 2016, but in 2017, it was "a bigger celebration", and further noted that the lyrics reflected the return of cricket in Pakistan. The music features synth horns, anthemic drums, and a chorus for crowd.

The song was initially released online on the new year's week, and the music video following on 29 January 2017. (Note: Fact obtained from the PSL and HBL's social media) Directed by Soheb Akhtar, it features Pakistani cricketers including Ramiz Raja, Shahid Afridi, Misbah-ul-Haq, Umar Gul, and Ahmad Shahzad. In the video, Zafar performed push-ups with Misbah, an act which reportedly had become controversial for the latter in 2016.

On 9 February, Zafar performed the song at the opening ceremony at Dubai International Cricket Stadium, and he was surrounded by the dancers from Sharmila Dance Center in white tees and denim. On 5 March, he returned on public demand to perform the song again at the closing ceremony prior to the 2017 Pakistan Super League final at Gaddafi Stadium, Lahore, despite initially refusing due to his prior scheduling commitments for filming Teefa in Trouble, and he was surrounded by the dancers in local traditional outfit. Andy Bull of The Guardian called the match as "the first step on a long, difficult but welcome road back to cricket in Pakistan", since the 2009 attack on the Sri Lanka national cricket team.

== Reception and legacy ==
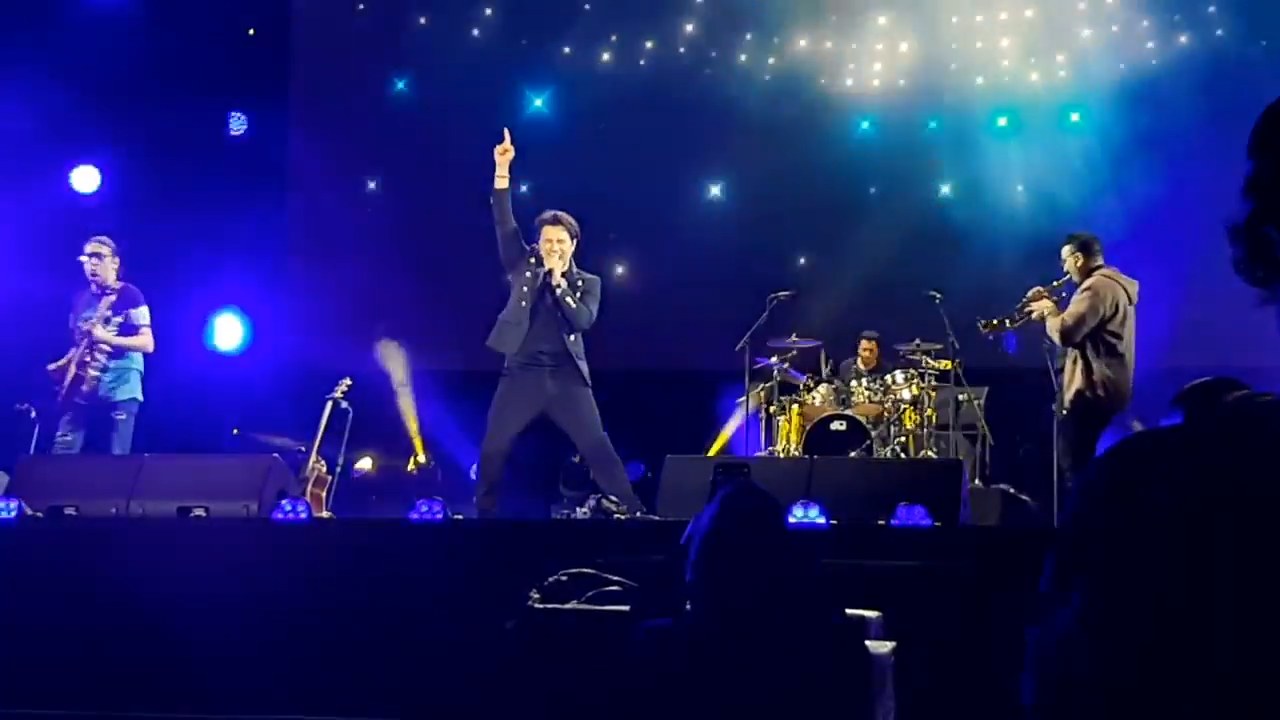
Zafar performed the song at the Expo 2020 in Dubai.

Annam Lodhi of Pakistan Today reviewed that the "music is fast with certain signature steps and blood pumping lyrics", and reported that a poll found that this was "the most popular" PSL anthem among "its listeners" that year. For The News, Maheen Sabeeh called the anthem as "the best of the lot", and Manal Faheem Khan wrote that the anthem had been "on everyone's mind since it first came out" and Zafar "shook the stadium with his powerful performance" at the opening ceremony. However, another reviewer from The News noted that the song may not be the memorable but the video essence is relatable to the Pakistani people. Gul Bukhari wrote in The Nation that "the frenzy" of the crowd over the anthem was "nothing less than enchanting" during the final match.

In 2018, Zohaib Ahmed Majeed wrote in Dawn that Zafar had "conjured up an even better anthem" as compared to his previous one. Asfia Afzal of Business Recorder called it a "hit" and "one of Pakistan's most heard songs of 2017". In 2019, journalist Zainab Abbas used the song for her entrance on the wedding music. In 2021, Rafay Mahmood wrote in The Express Tribune that "one might argue" that the anthem "had all the filmi elements" to "cook up a family-friendly entertainment". In 2024, Manahil Tahira of The Express Tribune and Asad Ahmed of Urdu News respectively called it as "the hit 2017 entry" and the identity of the PSL, and further noted in their reviews that some other anthems had failed to generate hype afterwards. Omair Alavi called it his favourite PSL anthem, and Imran Siddique regarded it as the "best song of PSL history".

In 2025, Ahmer Naqvi acknowledged in Dunya Digital that Zafar had the "most successful and popular PSL anthems" using "the power of the non-verbal chorus", however, called off his "repetition of words and themes". The News noted it as "a key part of PSL festivities". In 2026, Ali A. Rizvi of The Jungle Today noted it as the "undefeated" and "timeless" PSL anthem, and further called it "arguably the greatest cricket anthem Pakistan has ever produced". Mishal Zarrar wrote in Synergyzer that it had the "trifecta"; a "contagious hook", a "chant-ready chorus", and a "street-level simplicity"; thus becoming the "benchmark" which "later anthems tried to recreate but rarely matched".

Zafar also used to perform the song during his concerts in subsequent years. In 2019, 2020, 2021, and 2023, online polls were conducted by the journalists like Arfa Feroz, Faizan Lakhani, Mahwash Ajaz, and Zainab Sabir Mir, to choose the "best" PSL anthem, and "Ab Khel Jamay Ga" received the most votes each time respectively. Zainab Sabir Mir concluded the fans reception in a review on Geo News by calling it an "OG PSL anthem" and an "unofficial tune of cricket in Pakistan". Later in 2024, Zafar returned to the PSL and performed this anthem at the opening ceremony as well, along with his "Ab Khel Ke Dikha" and "Dil Se Jaan Laga De". Arfa Feroz noted that these three were the "best PSL songs" in the legacy.

== See also ==
External media

Audio
- Audio on YouTube

Video
- Music Video on YouTube
- Opening ceremony performance on YouTube
- Behind the scenes on YouTube

- List of Pakistan Super League anthems
- Ali Zafar discography
