= Multan Sultans =

Multan-based cricket franchise in the Pakistan Super League

- ملتان سلطانز
- League: Pakistan Super League

Personnel
- Captain: Ashton Turner
- Coach: Tim Paine
- Batting coach: Sohaib Maqsood
- Bowling coach: Saud Khan
- Fielding coach: Mohammad Irfan
- Owner: Gohar Shah
- Manager: Kamran Hussain

Team information
- City: Multan, Punjab, Pakistan
- Founded: 2017; 9 years ago
- Home ground: Multan Cricket Stadium
- Capacity: 35,000

History
- PSL wins: 1 (2021)
- Official website: multansultans.com
Home kit
Away kit

To see the team that became Rawalpindiz in 2026, see Rawalpindiz.

Multan Sultans (Urdu/Saraiki/Punjabi: ملتان سلطانز) are a professional Twenty20 franchise cricket team based in Multan, Punjab, that competes in the Pakistan Super League (PSL). The team is currently owned by Gohar Shah of CD Ventures who bought the Sialkot Stallionz franchise in 2026 and rebranded it to Multan Sultans. Their home ground is the Multan Cricket Stadium.

Multan Sultans had won their first PSL title in the 2021 season by defeating Peshawar Zalmi in the final. The franchise reached the finals in four consecutive seasons between 2021 and 2024, winning once and finishing runners-up three times, establishing itself as one of the PSL's most consistent teams.

== Franchise history ==
=== Multan Sultans 2018–2025 ===
The team was established in 2017 as the sixth franchise of the league, added ahead of the third season.

Initially, the franchise was owned by Schön Properties for US$41.6 million over eight seasons, but the contract was terminated in 2018 after payment defaults. Later that year, a consortium led by Alamgir Khan Tareen and Ali Khan Tareen acquired the team. Alamgir Tareen became the sole owner in 2021, and the Tareen family managed the franchise until 2025.

In 2025, the franchise became involved in a public dispute with the PCB regarding the Pakistan Super League's financial and operational structure. In April, franchise owner Tareen criticised the board's approach to the league's expansion and revenue model, arguing that the upcoming season lacked meaningful innovation despite being promoted as the "biggest ever." On 23 October 2025, the PCB issued a suspension and termination notice to the Multan Sultans over alleged contractual breaches.

On 25 November 2025, owner Ali Tareen announced via social media that he would no longer be the owner of Multan Sultans after failing to reach an agreement with the PCB for a renewal of his ownership. PCB decided to keep the franchise for the 2026 season and seek new buyers.

Multan Sultans were made available for auction ahead of the PSL 2026 season as the PCB invited bidders for the team franchise rights. On 9 February 2026, Walee Technologies won the auction with a bid of PKR 2.45 billion. The PCB offered the winning bidder the option to retain the Multan Sultans identity, change the team name, or relocate the franchise. Walee Technologies relocated the team to Rawalpindi and rebranded it as Rawalpindiz.

=== Sialkot Stallionz rebranding 2026–present ===
In January 2026, Pakistan Cricket Board held the auction for two new teams. Sialkot Stallionz and Hyderabad Kingsmen were confirmed as the two new teams. OZ Developers bought the Sialkot franchise with a successful bid of PKR 1.85 billion per year, making it the most expensive PSL team at that time.

Before the start of 2026 Pakistan Super League owners faced financial difficulties and avoided contract termination by submitting a delayed bank guarantee. After OZ Group declared bankruptcy Gohar Shah of CD Ventures (Private) Limited, who hails from Jalalpur Pirwala in District Multan, South Punjab, bought 98% of the shares and took full control of the franchise in February 2026. The remaining shares are still with OZ Developers because as per PCB rules full ownership cannot be transferred for 3 years.

After the acquisition Shah requested PCB to rebrand the franchise from Sialkot Stallionz to Multan Sultans which was accepted. Franchise fees which was Rs. 185 crores for Stallionz was increased to Rs. 200 crores with the rebranding.

== Performance in PSL ==
=== 2018 season ===
In its debut season, the team was captained by Shoaib Malik. Tom Moody and Wasim Akram were appointed as head coach and director respectively with Haider Azhar as general manager of cricket operations and Nadeem Khan the team's manager.

The team won its first match, defeating defending champions Peshawar Zalmi by seven wickets but finished fifth in the league table, winning four matches and losing five with one no result. They did not make the playoffs.

=== 2019 season ===
Ahead of the 2019 season, Johan Botha, who had been assistant coach during the previous season, was appointed as head coach, replacing Moody, who withdrew from his role due to domestic commitments. Wasim Akram also left the team, joining Karachi Kings.

The Sultans started their season against Karachi Kings with a close defeat and went on to win only three matches, again finishing fifth and failing to make the playoffs. Captain Shoaib Malik was the leading run scorer with 266 runs, while Shahid Afridi took 10 wickets to be the team's leading wicket taker for the season.

=== 2020 season ===
Ahead of the 2020 season, Shan Masood was named team captain and Andy Flower became the team's head coach. The team reached the playoff stage of the competition for the first time after finishing top of the group. They lost both of their playoff matches and did not reach the competition final finishing third overall.

=== 2021 season ===
In 2021, Multan finished second in the group stage and went on to win the PSL final for the first time. After winning the first qualifier match against Islamabad United, who had finished top of the group stage, Multan progressed straight to the final where they beat Peshawar Zalmi by 47 runs and won their first title.

=== 2022 season ===
Multan Sultans demonstrated a dominant performance in the tournament, securing the top position in the points table. Winning 9 out of 10 matches, they remained undefeated until losing the finals against Lahore Qalandars.

=== 2023 season ===
Multan Sultan played very well in this season they were on 2nd position in table before playoff and after first playoff they directly Qualify to the final after winning the match from Lahore Qalandar which was on the top of point table. However, in the final Lahore Qalandar won the final by very narrow margin of 1 runs.

=== 2024 season ===
Again, Multan Sultan played very well in the 2024 season they were on 1st position in table before playoff and after first playoff they directly Qualify to the final after winning the match from Peshawar Zalmi which was on the 2nd position of point table. However, in the final Islamabad United won the final by 2 wickets.

=== 2026 season ===
Multan Sultans first game was against Islamabad United where they beat them by 5 wickets with 8 balls to spare. They proceeded to face the brand new team Hyderabad Kingsmen where they won by 6 wickets with 8 balls to spare as well.

== Team identity ==
The team's logo and kit was revealed in September 2017. The team's anthem Hum Hain Multan kay Sultans for the 2018 season was sung by Waqar Ehsin. Pakistan film stars Momal Sheikh, Javed Sheikh, Ahsan Khan, Neelam Munir and actress Sadia Khan were the team's star ambassadors for the 2018 season.

Year	Kit manufacturer	Shirt sponsor (front)	Shirt sponsor (back)	Chest branding	Sleeve branding
2018		Lake City	Fatima Group	Mughal Steel	Inverex, Super Asia
2019		Pepsi	Afsaneh	Lay's	OLX, Asia Ghee Mill F.C.
2020		Pepsi	Fatima Group	Kurkure	Pepsi, Asia Ghee, Shell V-Power
2021		Pepsi	Fatima Group	G.F.C Fans	Snack Video, Asia Ghee
2022		Pepsi	Fatima Group	Wolf777 News	Asia Ghee, Shell V-Power, Nishan-E-Haider Builders and Developers
2023	AJ Sports	Pepsi	Fatima Group	Wolf777 News	Asia Ghee, Shell V-Power, Samaa TV
2024	Gym Armour	Pepsi	Fatima Group	Moiz Steel	Asia Ghee, KFC
2025		Pepsi	Fatima Group	Moiz Steel	Audionic, KFC Asia Ghee
2026			Fatima Group	Toyo Nasic	Nayyar Industries, Discover Pakistan, Jazz 5G, ONE life apparel, Moiz Steel, AJ Sports, LAAM, Dunya Media Group, Engro Corp, Cync Sports, Lahore Organic Village |

== Current squad ==
Key
- Players with international caps are listed in **bold**.
- * denotes a player who is fully unavailable
- * denotes a player who will be partially unavailable

No.	Name	Nationality	Birth date	Salary	Batting style	Bowling style	Year signed	Notes
Batsmen
49	**Steve Smith**	Australia	9 June 1989 (age 37)	PKR 14.0 crore	Right-handed	Right-arm leg break	2026	
51	**Sahibzada Farhan**	Pakistan	6 March 1996 (age 30)	PKR 5.70 crore	Right-handed	—	2026	
70	**Ashton Turner**	Australia	25 January 1993 (age 33)	PKR 4.20 crore	Right-handed	Right-arm off break	2026	Captain
30	**Shan Masood**	Pakistan	14 October 1989 (age 37)	PKR 65 lakh	Left-handed	Right-arm medium	2026	Vice Captain
15	Mohammad Awais Zafar	Pakistan	10 May 2000 (age 26)	PKR 60 lakh	Right-handed	—	2026	
Wicket-keepers
11	Lachlan Shaw	Australia	26 December 2002 (age 23)	PKR 60 lakh	Right-handed	—	2026	
22	**Josh Philippe**	Australia	1 June 1997 (age 29)	PKR 2.30 crore	Right-handed	—	2026	
	Hamza Zahoor	Pakistan	3 November 2007 (age 19)	PKR 24 lakh	Right-handed	—	2026	
All-rounders
21	**Mohammad Nawaz**	Pakistan	21 March 1994 (age 32)	PKR 6.16 crore	Left-handed	Left-arm orthodox	2026	
67	Delano Potgieter	South Africa	5 July 1996 (age 30)	PKR 60 lakh	Left-handed	Right-arm medium	2026	
27	Mohammad Shehzad	Pakistan	5 February 2004 (age 22)	PKR 60 lakh	Right-handed	Right-arm fast-medium	2026	
28	Atizaz Habib Khan	Pakistan	1 April 1997 (age 29)	PKR 60 lakh	Right-handed	Right-arm off break	2026	
23	**Arafat Minhas**	Pakistan	2 January 2005 (age 21)	PKR 1.10 crore	Left-handed	Slow left arm orthodox	2026	
96	Mohammad Imran Randhawa	Pakistan	25 December 1996 (age 29)	PKR 60 lakh	Right-handed	Right-arm fast-medium	2026	
Bowlers
64	**Peter Siddle**	Australia	25 November 1984 (age 41)	PKR 2.50 crore	Right-handed	Right-arm fast-medium	2026	
61	Mohammad Ismail	Pakistan	2 January 2006 (age 20)	PKR 60 lakh	Right-handed	Right-arm medium-fast	2026	
35	**Arshad Iqbal**	Pakistan	6 March 1996 (age 30)	PKR 60 lakh	Right-handed	Right-arm fast-medium	2026	
26	**Tabraiz Shamsi**	South Africa	18 February 1990 (age 36)	PKR 2.20 crore	Right-handed	Left-arm unorthodox spin	2026	
20	Momin Qamar	Pakistan	4 October 2006 (age 20)	PKR 1.075 crore	Left-handed	Left-arm unorthodox spin	2026	
37	**Faisal Akram**	Pakistan	20 August 2003 (age 23)	PKR 1.25 crore	Left-handed	Left-arm wrist spin	2026	
5	Shehzad Gul	Pakistan	18 July 1994 (age 32)	PKR 60 lakh	Right-handed	Left-arm medium-fast	2026	
74	**Mohammad Wasim Jr.**	Pakistan	25 August 2001 (age 25)	PKR 4.1 crore	Right-handed	Right-arm fast-medium	2026	
Source: ESPNcricinfo

== Management and coaching staff ==
Position	Name
Head coach	Tim Paine
Assistant coach	Mike Smith
Batting coach	Sohaib Maqsood
Bowling coach	Saud Khan
Tactical coach	Qaiser Abbas
Physio	Brendan Wilson
Director of cricket	Yasir Arafat
Manager	Kamran Hussain

== Captains ==
Player	From	To	Mat	Won	Lost	Tie&W	Tie&L	NR	%
Shoaib Malik	2018	2019	20	7	12	0	0	1	36.84
Shan Masood	2020	2020	11	6	3	0	1	1	65.00
Mohammad Rizwan	2021	2025	58	33	25	0	0	0	56.89
Ashton Turner	2026	present	5	4	1	0	0	0	80.00

Source: ESPNcricinfo. Last updated: 26 March 2024

== Result summary ==
=== Overall result in PSL ===
Year	Pld	Won	Lost	Tie	NR	Position	Summary
2018	10	4	5	0	1	5/6	League Stage
2019	10	3	7	0	0	5/6	League Stage
2020	11	6	3	0	2	1/6	Play-offs
2021	12	7	5	0	0	2/6	Champions
2022	12	10	2	0	0	1/6	Runners-up
2023	12	7	5	0	0	2/6	Runners-up
2024	12	8	4	0	0	1/6	Runners-up
2025	10	1	9	0	0	6/6	League Stage
Total	91	46	40	0	5	1 Title	

=== Performance Visuals ===
League Position by Season
1st								
2nd								
5th								
6th								
	'18	'19	'20	'21	'22	'23	'24	'25

Win/Loss Ratio (2018–2025)
■ Wins	50.5%
■ Losses	44.0%
■ N/R	5.5%

=== Head-to-head record ===
Opposition	Span	Mat	Won	Lost	Tie+W	Tie+L	NR	SR (%)
Islamabad United	2018–2025	18	8	10	0	0	0	44.44
Karachi Kings	2018–2025	17	7	7	0	1	2	50.00
Lahore Qalandars	2018–2025	23	11	12	0	0	0	52.38
Peshawar Zalmi	2018–2025	18	11	7	0	0	0	61.11
Quetta Gladiators	2018–2025	15	9	6	0	0	0	60.00

MS Success vs Opponents (2025)
8:10	7:7	11:10	11:7	9:6
IU	KK	LQ	PZ	QG

Key: ■ MS Won | ■ IU | ■ KK | ■ LQ | ■ PZ | ■ QG
Source: ESPNcricinfo, Last updated: 23 February 2026

== Statistics ==
As of 22 February 2026

=== Most runs ===
Player	Years	Innings	Runs	High score
Mohammad Rizwan	2021–2025	58	2,370	110*
Shan Masood	2019–2023	43	1,319	88
RR Rossouw	2020–2023	42	1,122	121
Usman Khan	2023–2025	18	810	120
Sohaib Maqsood	2018–2022	28	771	85*

Most Runs (MS 2026)
2370	1319	1122	810	771
Rizwan	Masood	Rossouw	Usman	Maqsood

=== Most wickets ===
Player	Years	Innings	Wickets	Best bowling
Imran Tahir	2018–2022	37	53	3/7
Usama Mir	2023–2025	31	45	6/40
Abbas Afridi	2022–2024	25	39	5/47
Shahnawaz Dahani	2021–2024	27	39	4/5
DJ Willey	2022–2025	26	34	3/22

Most Wickets (MS 2026)
53	45	39	39	34
Tahir	Usama	Abbas	Dahani	Willey
