= History of the T20 World Cup =

International cricket competition history

T20 World Cup logos used since 2024
T20 World Cup logos used from 2020 to 2023 (same logo design was used for World Twenty20 since 2016)
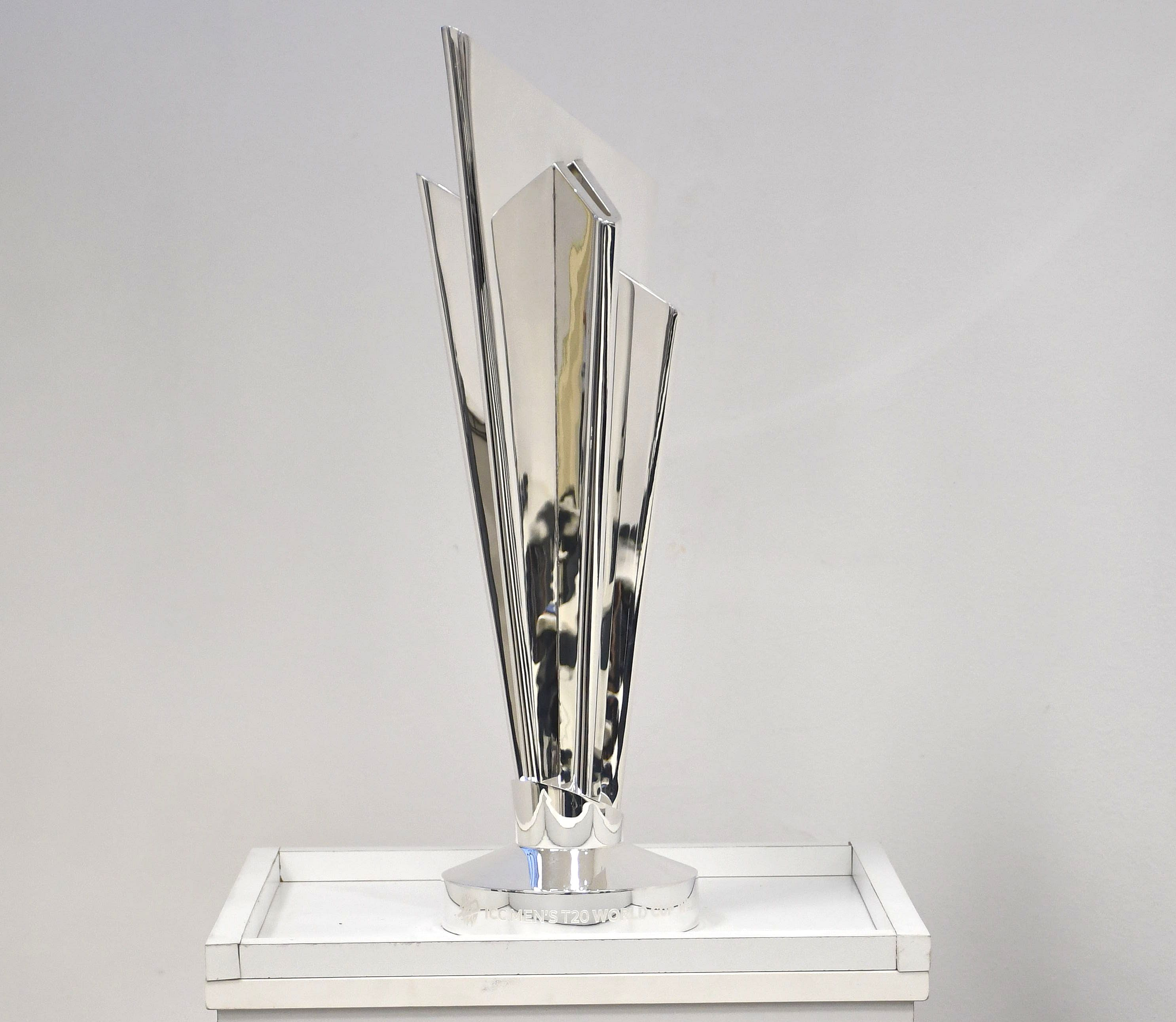
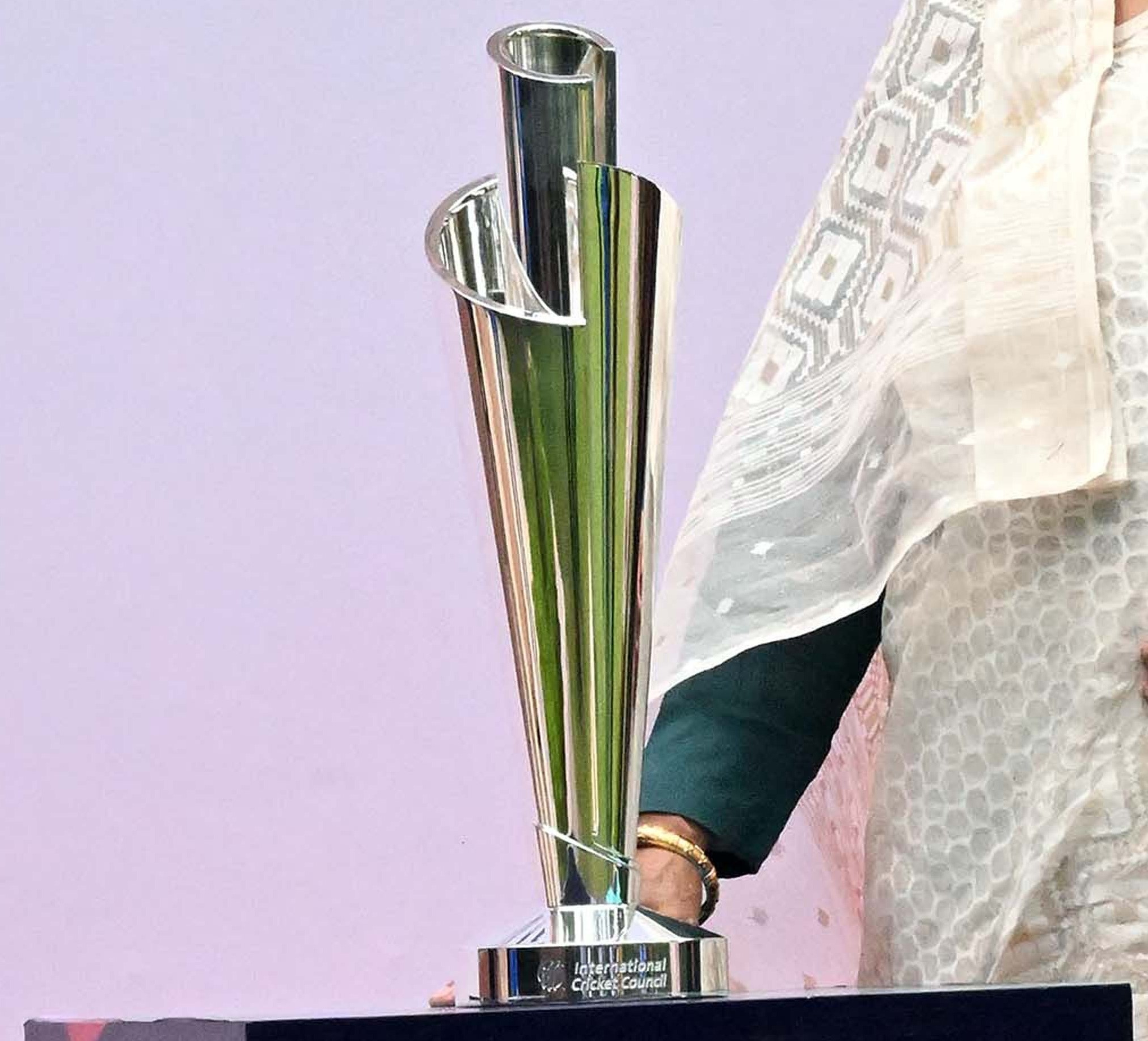
Left: Men's T20 World Cup trophy
Right: Women's T20 World Cup trophy

The ICC T20 World Cup, formerly the ICC World Twenty20, is a biennial world cup for cricket in the 20-over format, organised by the International Cricket Council (ICC). The Men's T20 World Cup in the Twenty20 International (T20I) format was held in every odd year from 2007 to 2009, and since 2010 has been held in every even year with the exception of 2018 and 2020. The Women's T20 World Cup in the Women's Twenty20 International (WT20I) format was inaugurated in 2009, and since 2010 has been held in every even year with the exception of 2022. In 2018, the tournaments were rebranded from the World Twenty20 to the T20 World Cup. Until 2016, both men's and women's tournaments were held together; since 2018 both are held separately but in the same calendar year with the exception of 2018 and 2020–2023.

The 2011 editions of the tournaments were brought forward to 2010 to replace the ICC Champions Trophy. In May 2016, the ICC put forward the idea of having a men's tournament in 2018, with South Africa being the possible host country, but later dropped the idea due to multiple men's bilateral series taking place that year. The 2020 edition of the men's tournament was scheduled to take place in Australia but due to the COVID-19 pandemic, the tournament was postponed until 2021, with the intended host changed to India. The 2021 Men's T20 World Cup was later relocated to the United Arab Emirates and Oman due to problems relating to the COVID-19 pandemic in India, taking place five years after the previous (2016) edition. The 2022 edition of the women's tournament was scheduled to take place in South Africa but was postponed to 2023 due to the Women's ODI Cricket World Cup taking place in 2022. The 2024 Women's T20 World Cup was scheduled to take place in Bangladesh but was relocated to the United Arab Emirates due to the political unrest in Bangladesh.

As of 2026, ten men's editions have been played; a total of 25 teams have competed and six teams have won the Men's T20 World Cup. India (2007, 2024, 2026) are the most successful team with three titles. West Indies (2012, 2016) and England (2010, 2022) have won it twice, while Pakistan (2009), Sri Lanka (2014), and Australia (2021) have one title each. A total of 15 countries have hosted the men's tournament (including 6 island nations of the West Indies). India are the current champions, having won their third title in the 2026 edition. The next edition of the men's tournament will take place in Australia and New Zealand in 2028.

As of 2026, ten women's editions have been played; a total of 13 teams have competed and four teams have won the Women's T20 World Cup. Australia (2010, 2012, 2014, 2018, 2020, 2023, 2026) are the most successful team with seven titles. England (2009), New Zealand (2024) and West Indies (2016) have one title each. A total of 12 countries have hosted the women's tournament (including 5 island nations of the West Indies). Australia are the current champions, having won their seventh title in the 2026 edition. The next edition of the women's tournament will take place in Pakistan in 2028.

== Background ==
When the Benson & Hedges Cup ended in 2002, the England and Wales Cricket Board (ECB) sought another one-day competition to appeal to the younger generation in response to dwindling crowds and reduced sponsorship. The board wanted to deliver fast-paced, exciting cricket accessible to fans who were put off by the longer versions of the game. Stuart Robertson, the marketing manager of the ECB, proposed a 20-over per innings game to county chairmen in 2001, and they voted 11–7 in favour of adopting the new format.

=== Regional competitions ===
The first official Twenty20 matches were played on 13 June 2003 between the English counties in the T20 Blast's inaugural edition. The first season of Twenty20 in England was a relative success, with Surrey defeating Warwickshire by 9 wickets in the final to claim the title. The first official Women's Twenty20 matches were played on 29 May 2004 as part of the 2004 Super Fours. The first Twenty20 match held at Lord's, on 15 July 2004 between Middlesex and Surrey, attracted a crowd of 26,500, the largest attendance for any county cricket game at the ground since 1953.

Soon after with the adoption of the Twenty20 format by other cricket boards, the popularity of the format grew with higher crowd attendance, new regional tournaments and the financial incentive in the format. West Indies regional teams competed in what was named the Stanford 20/20 tournament which was financially backed by billionaire Allen Stanford, who gave at least US$28,000,000 funding money; with the intent for the tournament to be an annual event. A spin-off tournament, the Stanford Super Series was held in October 2008 between Middlesex and Trinidad and Tobago, the respective winners of the English and Caribbean Twenty20 competitions, and a Stanford Superstars team formed from West Indies domestic players.

=== Twenty20 Internationals ===
The first full international women's Twenty20 match was played on 5 August 2004 between England and New Zealand at County Cricket Ground in Hove. The first full international men's Twenty20 match was played on 17 February 2005 between Australia and New Zealand at Eden Park in Auckland. The game was played in a light-hearted manner.

== Initial years (2007–2010) ==
The 2007, 2009 and 2010 men's tournaments were included in the 2006–2012 ICC Men's Future Tours Programme.

=== 2007 ICC World Twenty20 ===
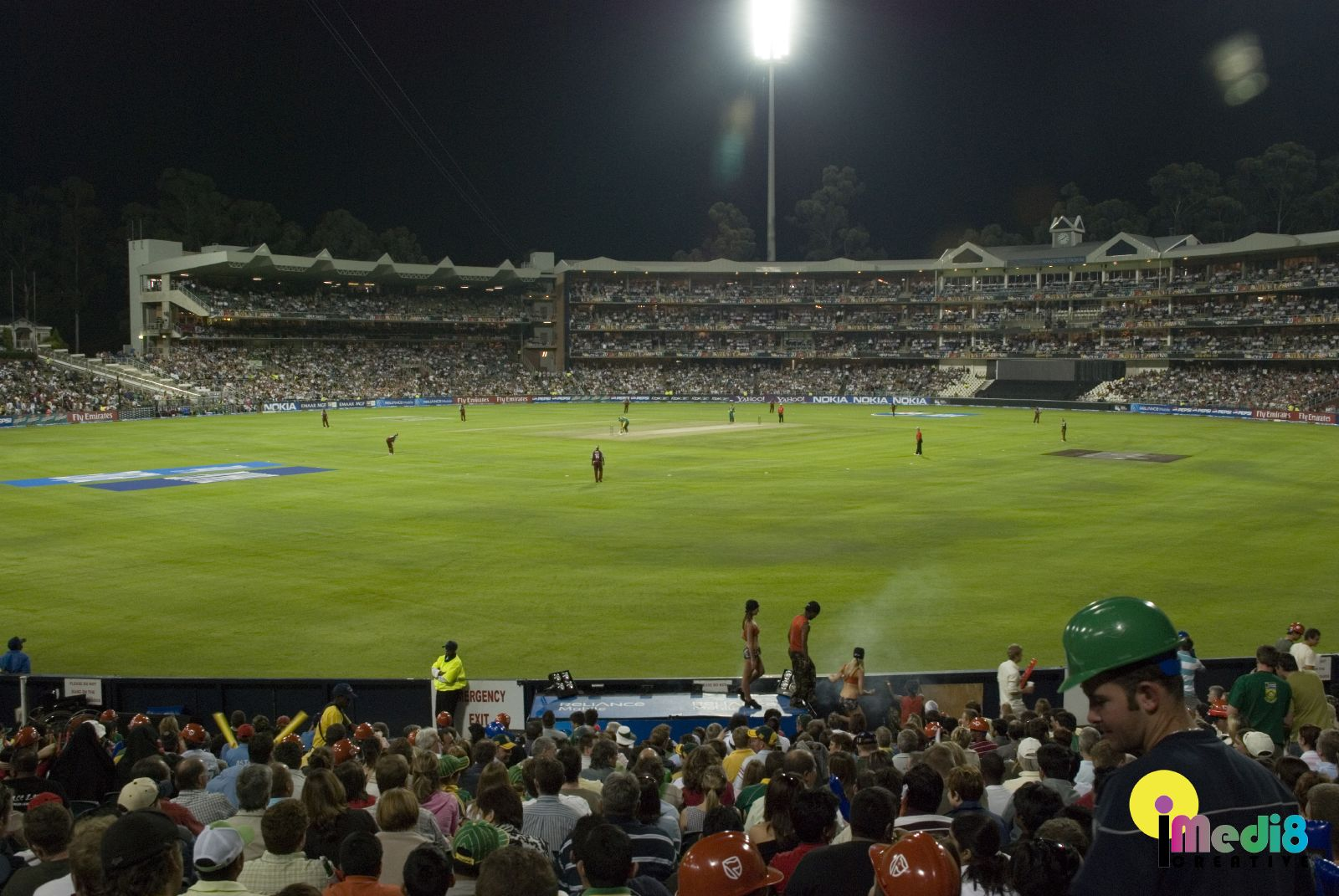
Wanderers Stadium in Johannesburg during 2007 World Twenty20 match between West Indies and South Africa.

The first World Twenty20 tournament was in 2007 in South Africa. Ten then full members qualified directly for the tournament along with the top two teams from the 2007 WCL Division One. Twelve teams played in a round-robin group stage of four groups; from which two teams from each group advanced to the Super 8 stage. Super 8 stage was played in a round-robin format of two groups; from which two teams from each group advanced to the knockout stage of four teams.

In the final, India defeated Pakistan by 5 runs at Wanderers Stadium in Johannesburg to become the inaugural champions of the men's tournament. Australia's Matthew Hayden scored the most runs in the tournament (265) while Pakistan's Umar Gul took the most wickets (13). Pakistan's Shahid Afridi was named as the player of the tournament.

=== 2009 ICC World Twenty20 ===
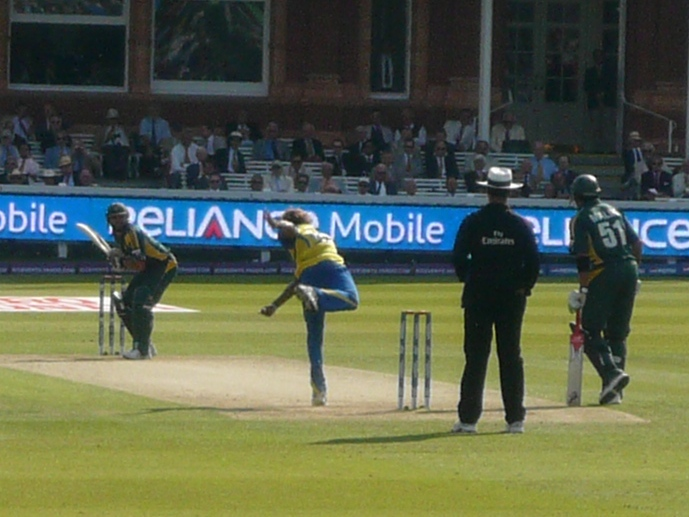
Lord's in London during 2009 World Twenty20 final match between Pakistan and Sri Lanka.

In December 2007, the ICC approved a Women's World Twenty20 tournament to be held alongside the men's tournament from the 2009 tournament (men's • women's) in England onwards. The ICC also introduced a separate men's qualifier for the associate teams advanced from the World Cricket League, through which top two associates qualified for the World Twenty20 while all ten full members were given direct qualification. The first World Twenty20 Qualifier was held in August 2008 in Ireland featuring 6 teams.

Following Zimbabwe's withdrawal due to the political issues related to Robert Mugabe and British government's ban from touring England; a third team from the qualifier: Scotland replaced them in the 2009 men's tournament. The men's tournament was held in the same format as 2007, along with the introduction of Super Over as match tie-breaker. In the men's final, Pakistan defeated Sri Lanka by 8 wickets at Lord's in London to become the champions of the 2009 men's tournament. Sri Lanka's Tillakaratne Dilshan scored the most runs in the tournament (317) while Pakistan's Umar Gul took the most wickets (13). Tillakaratne Dilshan was also named as the player of the tournament.

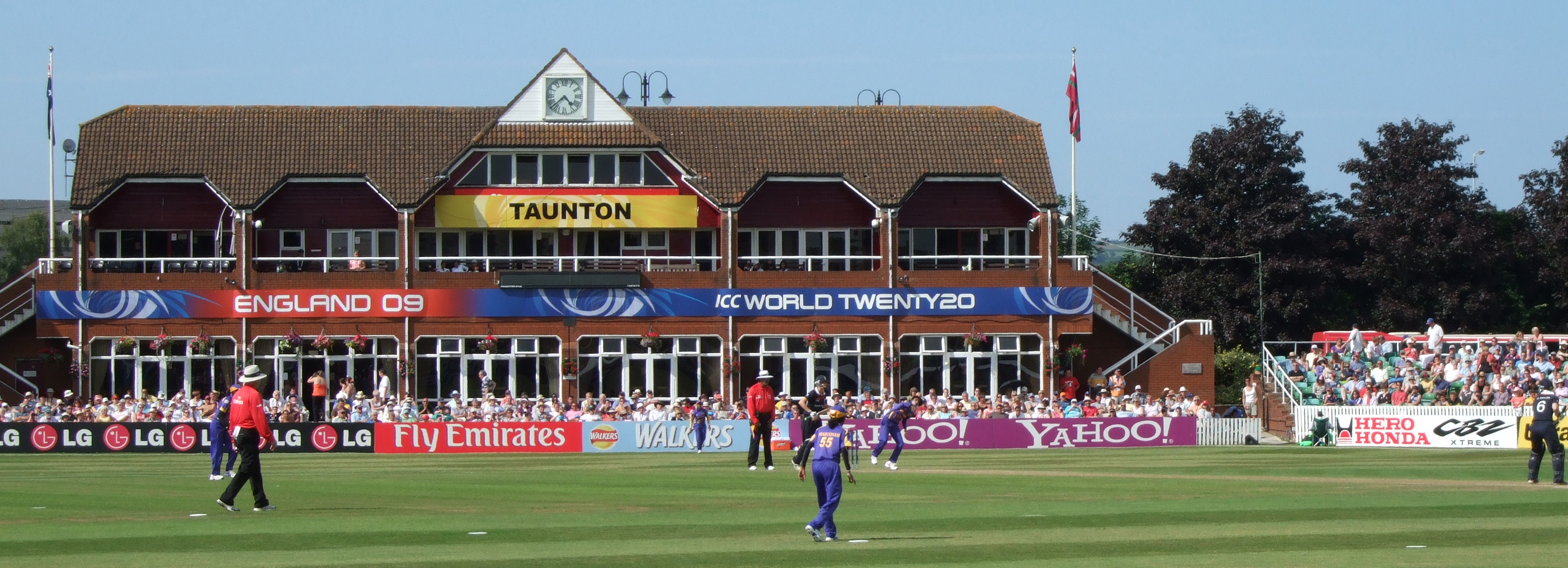
County Ground in Taunton during 2009 Women's World Twenty20 match between England and Sri Lanka.

The women's tournament featured the top eight teams from the ICC Women's T20I Team Rankings playing in a round-robin of two groups; from which two teams from each group advanced to the knockout stage of four teams. In the women's final, England defeated New Zealand by 6 wickets at Lord's to become the inaugural champions of the women's tournament. New Zealand's Aimee Watkins scored the most runs in the tournament (200) while England's Holly Colvin took the most wickets (9). England's Claire Taylor was named as the player of the tournament.

=== 2010 ICC World Twenty20 ===
Next cycle of tournaments (men's • women's) in the West Indies, initially scheduled for 2011 were brought forward to 2010 to replace the ICC Champions Trophy. This scheduling bottleneck was caused after the 5th edition of the Champions Trophy, scheduled to be hosted by Pakistan in 2008, was delayed to 2009 and was shifted to South Africa due to the security concerns in the aftermath of Pakistani attack on the Sri Lanka team. The Champions Trophy was converted into a quadrennial tournament after that. Both tournaments retained the formats they had in 2009. The second men's qualifier was held in February 2010 in the United Arab Emirates featuring 8 teams.

In the men's final, England defeated Australia by 7 wickets at Kensington Oval in Bridgetown to become the champions of the 2010 men's tournament and win their maiden title at an ICC men's event. Sri Lanka's Mahela Jayawardene scored the most runs in the tournament (302) while Australia's Dirk Nannes took the most wickets (14). England's Kevin Pietersen was named as the player of the tournament.

In the women's final, Australia defeated New Zealand by 3 runs at Kensington Oval to become the champions of the 2010 women's tournament. New Zealand's Sara McGlashan scored the most runs in the tournament (147) while India's Diana David and New Zealand's Nicola Browne were tied for taking the most wickets (9 each). Nicola Browne was also named as the player of the tournament.

== Tournament expansions (2012–2016) ==
The 2012, 2014 and 2016 men's tournaments were included in the initial 2011–2020 ICC Men's Future Tours Programme draft. The 2016 men's tournament was included in the finalised 2015–2019 ICC Men's Future Tours Programme.

=== 2012 ICC World Twenty20 ===
The 2012 cycle of tournaments were to be expanded but were kept in the same format as 2009 and 2010 for one last time. A new expanded qualification pathway for the 2012 men's tournament was introduced. Six top associates from the previous cycle directly competed in the global qualifier while 81 associate nations competed in the regional qualifiers for the remaining ten spots in the global qualifier in March 2012 in the United Arab Emirates. Two associates from the global qualifier qualified for the World Twenty20 while, all ten full members were given direct qualification.

In the men's final, West Indies defeated Sri Lanka by 36 runs at R. Premadasa Stadium in Colombo to become the champions of the 2012 men's tournament and win their first ICC title since 1979. Australia's Shane Watson scored the most runs in the tournament (249) while Sri Lanka's Ajantha Mendis took the most wickets (15). Shane Watson was also named as the player of the tournament.

The 2012 women's tournament also included two place playoffs to decide qualification berths for the following (2014) tournament. In the women's final, Australia defeated England by 4 runs at R. Premadasa Stadium to become the champions of the 2012 women's tournament and win their second consecutive title. England's Charlotte Edwards scored the most runs in the tournament (172) while Australia's Julie Hunter took the most wickets (11). Charlotte Edwards was also named as the player of the tournament.

=== 2014 ICC World Twenty20 ===
For the 2014 cycle held in Bangladesh, the men's tournament expanded to feature 16 teams while the women's tournament expanded to feature 10 teams. The men's qualifier was held in November 2013 in the United Arab Emirates featuring 6 top associates from the previous (2012) tournament and 10 associates advanced from the 67 competed in the regional qualifiers. Top six teams from the qualifier qualified for the World Twenty20 while, all ten full members were given direct qualification. A separate women's qualifier and a series of regional qualifiers were introduced for the women's tournament as well. The first Women's World Twenty20 Qualifier was held in July 2013 in Ireland featuring two last placed teams in the previous (2012) tournament, a host team and 5 teams advanced from regional qualifiers. Top 3 teams from the qualifier qualified for the Women's World Twenty20 while, top six teams from the previous (2012) tournament and a host team were given direct qualification.

The men's tournament format was also updated with the eight top placed teams from the previous (2012) tournament directly qualifing for the Super stage now called Super 10 stage with ten teams. Remaining eight teams played in a round-robin group stage of two groups; from which one team from each group advanced to the Super 10 stage. Super 10 stage was played in a round-robin format of two groups; from which two teams from each group advanced to the knockout stage of four teams. Hong Kong, Nepal, and the United Arab Emirates made their World Twenty20 debuts. In the men's final, Sri Lanka defeated India by 6 wickets at Sher-e-Bangla National Cricket Stadium in Dhaka to become the champions of the 2014 men's tournament and win their first ICC title since 1996. India's Virat Kohli scored the most runs in the tournament (319) while South Africa's Imran Tahir and Netherlands' Ahsan Malik were tied for taking the most wickets (12 each). Virat Kohli was also named as the player of the tournament.

The women's tournament was held in a round-robin of two groups; from which two teams from each group advanced to the knockout stage of four teams. It also included four place playoffs to decide qualification berths for following (2016) tournament. Bangladesh and Ireland made their Women's World Twenty20 debuts. In the women's final, Australia defeated England by 6 wickets at Sher-e-Bangla Stadium to become the champions of the 2014 women's tournament and win their third consecutive title. Australia's Meg Lanning scored the most runs in the tournament (257) while England's Anya Shrubsole took the most wickets (13). Anya Shrubsole was also named as the player of the tournament.

=== 2016 ICC World Twenty20 ===
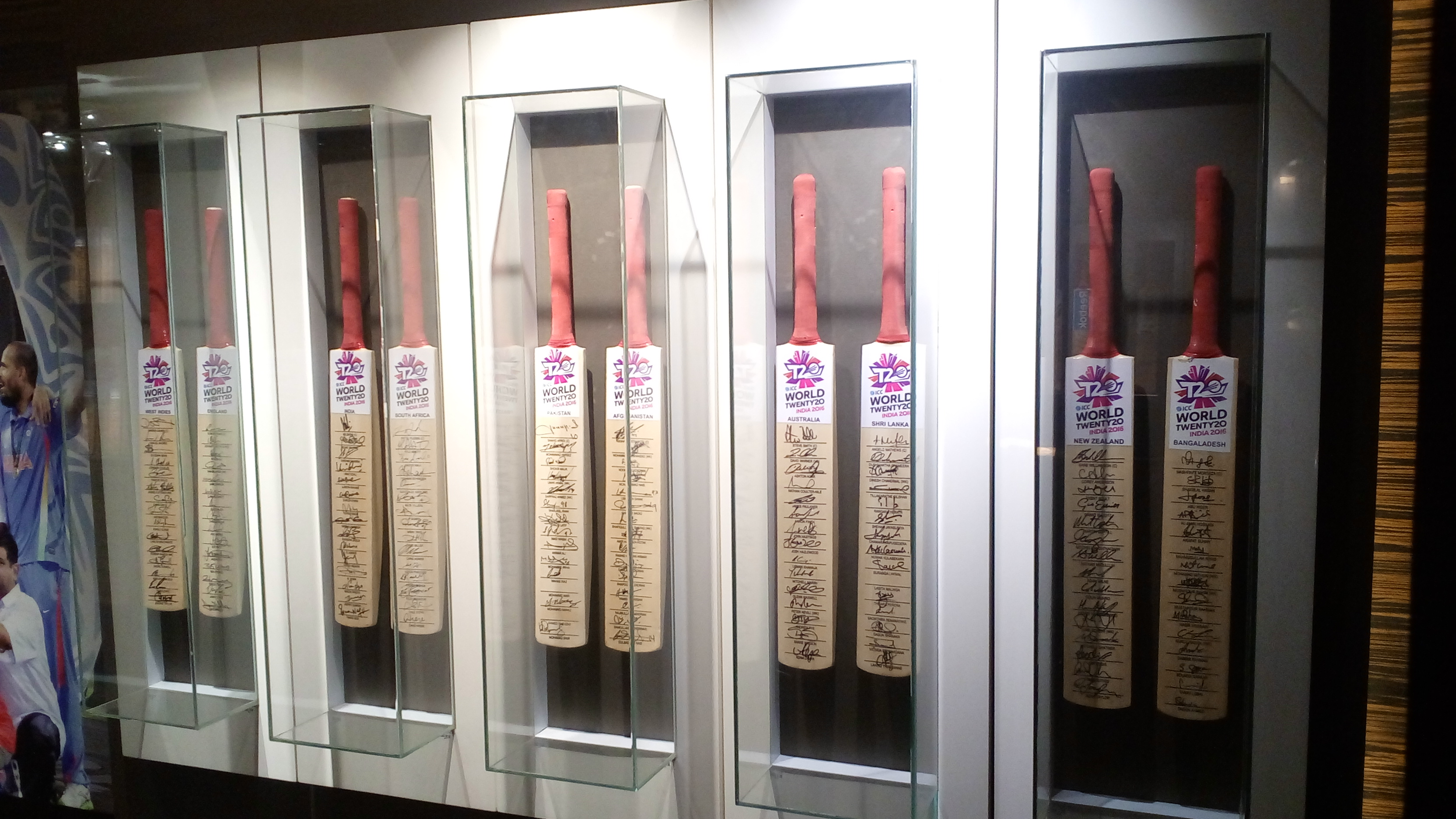
Bats autographed by 2016 World Twenty20 participant teams in display at Blades of Glory Cricket Museum in Pune.

The 2016 cycle in India was the last to have the men's tournament and the women's tournament held together. Although the Pakistan Cricket Board (PCB) initially refused to participate in India; they eventually agreed to participate with the Pakistani men's matches being held in Kolkata and Mohali, and women's matches being held in Chennai and Delhi. Both tournaments were held in the same format as 2014.

The men's qualifier was held in July 2015 in Ireland and Scotland featuring 6 top associates from the previous (2014) tournament and 8 associates advanced from the 46 competed in the regional qualifiers. Top six teams from the qualifier qualified for the World Twenty20 while, all ten full members were given direct qualification. This was the last year direct qualification was given based on full membership. Oman made their World Twenty20 debut. In the men's final, West Indies defeated England by 4 wickets at Eden Gardens in Kolkata to become the champions of the 2016 men's tournament and the first men's team to win two World Twenty20 titles. Bangladesh's Tamim Iqbal scored the most runs in the tournament (295) while Afghanistan's Mohammad Nabi took the most wickets (12). India's Virat Kohli was named as the player of the tournament.

The women's qualifier was held in November and December 2015 in Thailand featuring two last placed teams in the previous (2014) tournament, a host team and 5 teams advanced from regional qualifiers. Top 2 teams from the qualifier qualified for the Women's World Twenty20 while, the top eight teams from the previous (2014) tournament including a host team were given direct qualification. In the women's final, West Indies defeated Australia by 8 wickets at Eden Gardens to become the champions of the 2016 women's tournament. West Indies' Stafanie Taylor scored the most runs in the tournament (246) while New Zealand's Leigh Kasperek and Sophie Devine and West Indies' Deandra Dottin were tied for taking the most wickets (9 each). Stafanie Taylor was also named as the player of the tournament. West Indies became the first team to win both men's and women's tournaments in the same year.

== Disruptions and rebranding (2018–2023) ==
The 2020 and 2021 men's tournaments were included in the 2018–2023 ICC Men's Future Tours Programme. The rescheduled 2022 men's tournament was included in the 2023–2027 ICC Men's Future Tours Programme. The rescheduled 2023 women's tournament was included in the 2022–2025 ICC Women's Future Tours Programme.

=== 2018 ICC World Twenty20 ===
In May 2016, the ICC proposed a World Twenty20 tournament in 2018, with South Africa being the possible host, but this was later dropped as the top member nations were busy with multiple bilateral tour matches that year. The women's tournament was held in the West Indies with the same format as previous years. This marked the first instance of having a women's tournament separate from the men's. In April 2018, the ICC announced that all member teams would be awarded full WT20I status from July 2018 onwards, and full men's T20I status from January 2019 onwards; previously only top associates and full members had international status.

The women's qualifier was held in July 2018 in the Netherlands featuring two last placed teams in the previous (2016) tournament, a host team and 5 teams advanced from regional qualifiers. Top 2 teams from the qualifier qualified for the Women's World Twenty20 while, the top eight teams from the previous (2016) tournament including a host team were given direct qualification. In the women's final, Australia defeated England by 8 wickets at Sir Vivian Richards Stadium in North Sound to become the champions of the 2018 women's tournament and win their fourth title. Australia's Alyssa Healy scored the most runs in the tournament (225) while West Indies' Deandra Dottin and Australia's Ashleigh Gardner and Megan Schutt were tied for taking the most wickets (10 each). Alyssa Healy was also named as the player of the tournament.

=== 2020–21 ICC T20 World Cup ===
In November 2018, as part of a goal to heighten the profile of the World Twenty20 tournaments, the ICC announced that they would be rebranded as the "T20 World Cup" beginning in 2020. Initially, Australia was set to host both the men's and women's tournaments in 2020 as separate tournaments, however in July 2020, the ICC announced that the 2020 men's tournament had been postponed to 2021 due to the COVID-19 pandemic and with Australian international travel restrictions not expected to be lifted until 2021. Later, the ICC chose to relocate the men's tournament to India, and award Australia the 2022 edition as compensation. Due to concerns over the COVID-19 pandemic in India, the men's tournament was played at venues in the United Arab Emirates and Oman instead, although the Board of Control for Cricket in India (BCCI) remained as the formal host.

The women's qualifier was held in August – September 2019 in Scotland featuring two last placed teams in the previous (2018) tournament, a host team and 5 teams advanced from the [...] competed in the regional qualifiers. Zimbabwe were initially set to take part in the qualifier, but following the Zimbabwe Cricket's suspension by the ICC in July 2019, they were replaced by Namibia. Top 2 teams from the qualifier qualified for the Women's T20 World Cup while, the top eight teams from the previous (2018) tournament including a host team were given direct qualification. The men's qualifier was held in October – November 2019 in the United Arab Emirates featuring 5 teams from the ICC Men's T20I Team Rankings, a host team and 8 teams advanced from the 66 competed in the expanded two-stage regional qualifiers (sub-regional qualifiers and regional finals). Zimbabwe were initially set to take part in the qualifier, but following the Zimbabwe Cricket's suspension by the ICC in July 2019, they were replaced by Nigeria. Top 6 teams from the qualifier qualified for the Men's T20 World Cup while, the top ten teams from the T20I Rankings including a host team (India) were given direct qualification.

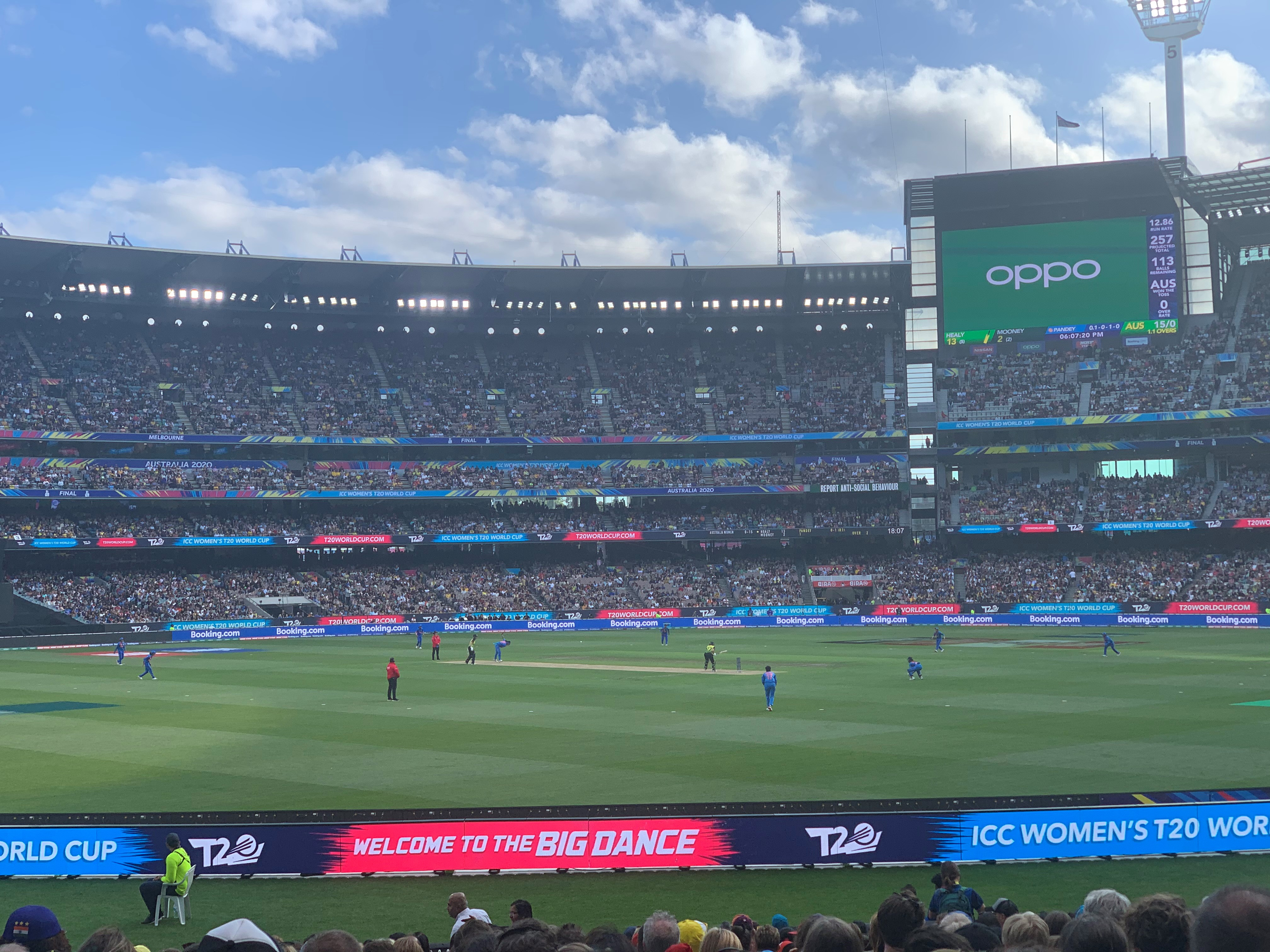
Melbourne Cricket Ground during 2020 Women's T20 World Cup final match between Australia and India.

The women's tournament was held in Australia with the same format as previous years: ten teams played in a round-robin of two groups; from which two teams from each group advanced to the knockout stage of four teams. Thailand made their Women's T20 World Cup debut. In the women's final, Australia defeated India by 85 runs at Melbourne Cricket Ground in Melbourne to become the champions of the 2020 women's tournament and win their second consecutive and fifth overall title. Australia's Beth Mooney scored the most runs in the tournament (259) while Megan Schutt took the most wickets (13). Beth Mooney was also named as the player of the tournament.

The men's tournament was held in the United Arab Emirates and Oman with a new expanded tournament format: eight top placed teams from the T20I Rankings directly qualifing for the Super stage now called Super 12 stage with twelve teams. Remaining eight teams played in a round-robin group stage of two groups; from which two teams from each group advanced to the Super 12 stage. Super 12 stage was played in a round-robin format of two groups; from which two teams from each group advanced to the knockout stage of four teams. Namibia and Papua New Guinea made their Men's T20 World Cup debut. In the men's final, Australia defeated New Zealand by 8 wickets at Dubai International Cricket Stadium in Dubai to become the champions of the 2021 men's tournament and win their maiden Men's T20 World Cup title. Pakistan's Babar Azam scored the most runs in the tournament (303) while Sri Lanka's Wanindu Hasaranga took the most wickets (16). Australia's David Warner was named as the player of the tournament. Australia became the second team to win both men's and women's tournaments in the same cycle.

=== 2022–23 ICC T20 World Cup ===
The men's qualifier featured four last placed teams in the previous (2021) tournament, four teams based on the T20I Rankings and 8 teams advanced from the 72 competed in the regional qualifiers. The men's qualifier was held in two phases: Global Qualifier A in February 2022 in Oman and Global Qualifier B in July 2022 in Zimbabwe each featuring eight teams. The men's global qualifier would be discontinued after 2022. Top 4 teams from the qualifier qualified for the Men's T20 World Cup while, the top twelve teams from the previous (2021) tournament including a host team were given direct qualification. The women's qualifier was held in September 2022 in the United Arab Emirates featuring two last placed teams in the previous (2020) tournament and 6 teams advanced from the 37 competed in the regional qualifiers. Top 2 teams from the qualifier qualified for the Women's T20 World Cup while, the top eight teams from the previous (2020) tournament including a host team were given direct qualification.

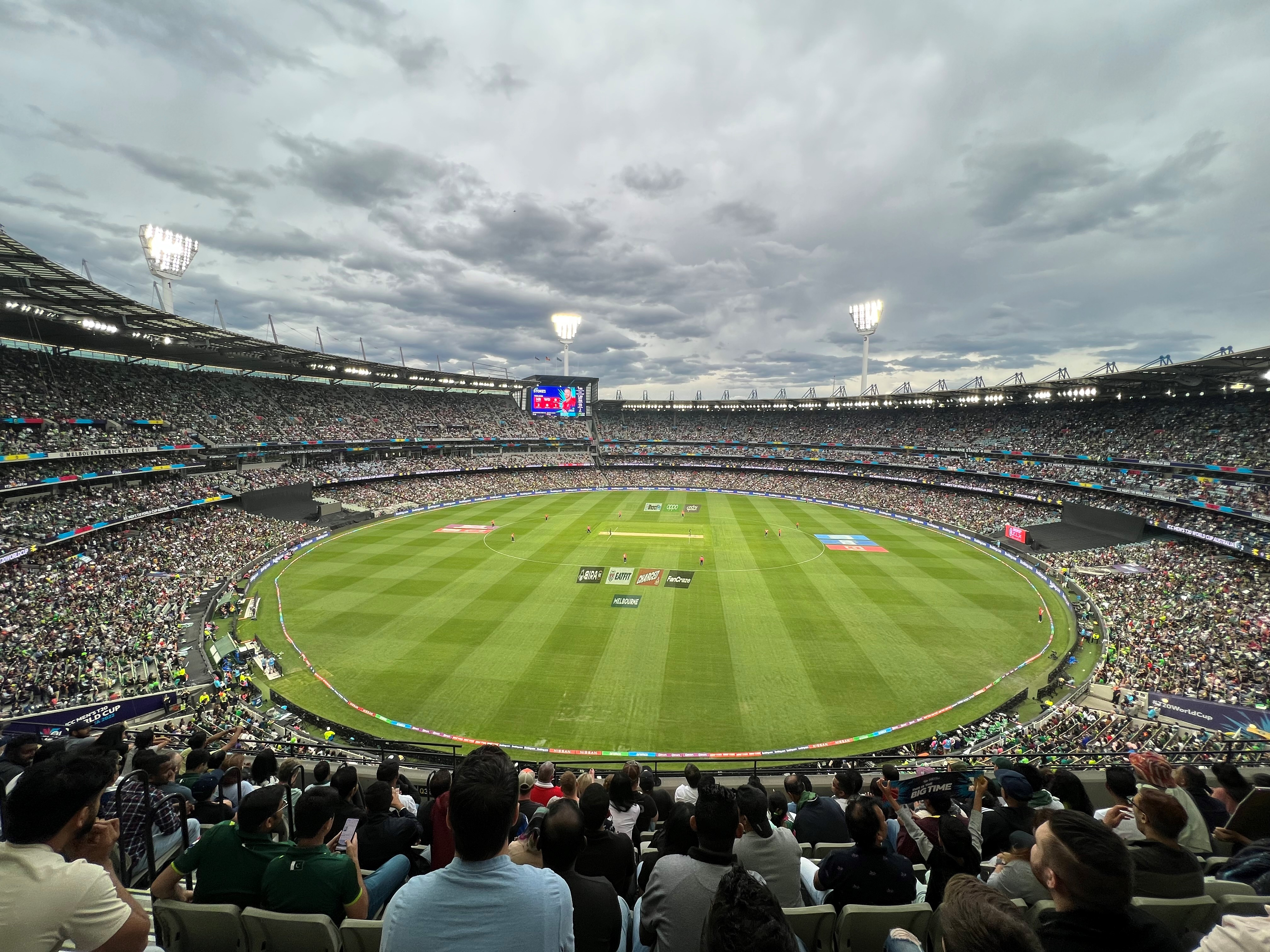
Melbourne Cricket Ground during 2022 Men's T20 World Cup final match between England and Pakistan.

The men's tournament was held in Australia with the same format as previous year. In the men's final, England defeated Pakistan by 5 wickets at Melbourne Cricket Ground to become the champions of the 2022 men's tournament and the second team to win two Men's T20 World Cup titles. India's Virat Kohli scored the most runs in the tournament (296) while Sri Lanka's Wanindu Hasaranga took the most wickets (15). England's Sam Curran was named as the player of the tournament. England became the first men's team to hold both ODI World Cup and T20 World Cup titles at the same time having won the 2019 Cricket World Cup.

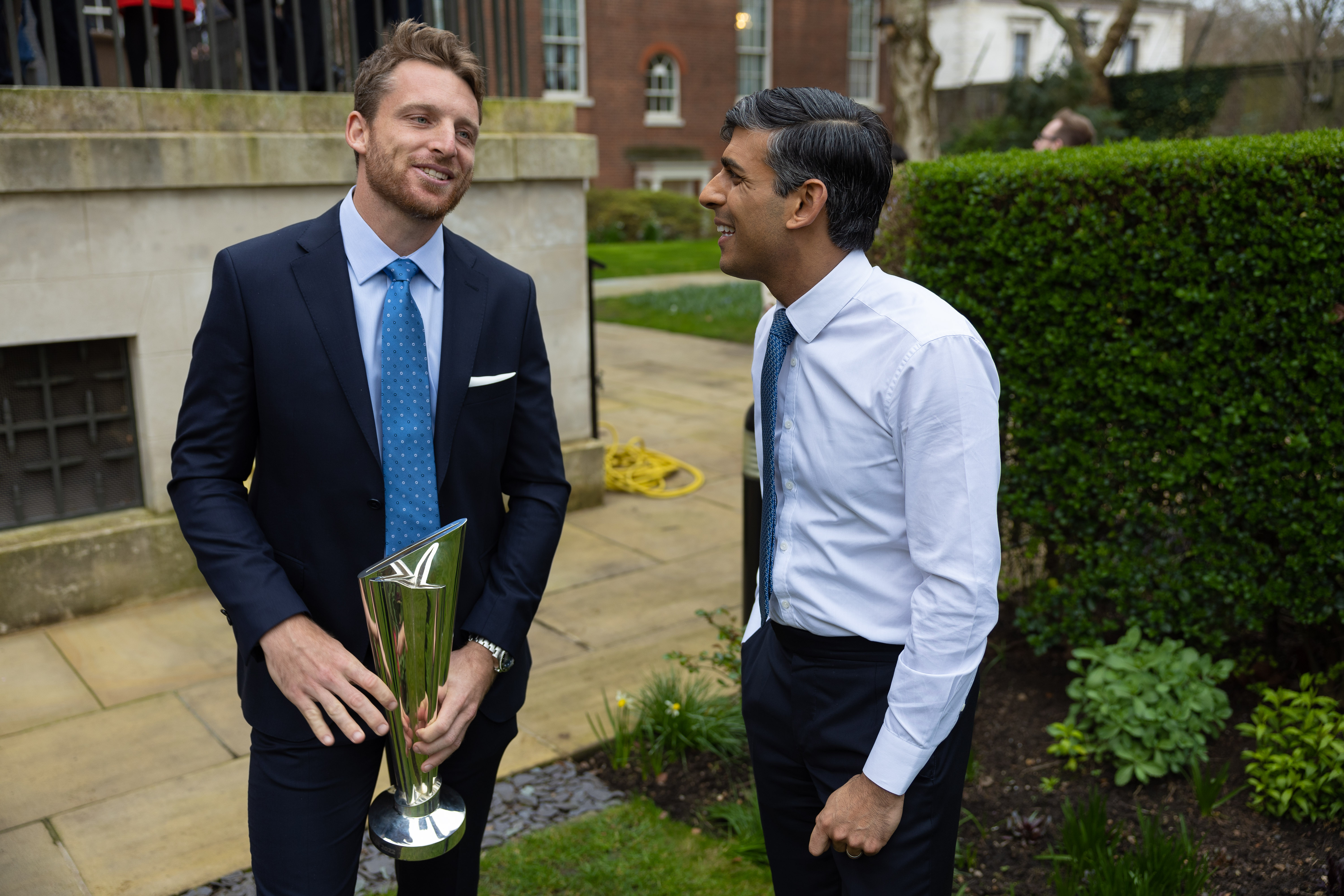
Former UK Prime Minister Rishi Sunak with England captain Jos Buttler holding the Men's T20 World Cup trophy.

The women's tournament was scheduled to be held in South Africa in 2022 with the same format as previous years. However after the Women's ODI Cricket World Cup was postponed from 2021 to 2022 due to the qualifiers being disrupted by the COVID-19 pandemic; the Women's T20 World Cup was postponed to 2023. In the women's final, Australia defeated South Africa by 19 runs at Newlands Cricket Ground in Cape Town to become the champions of the 2023 women's tournament and win their third consecutive and sixth overall title. South Africa's Laura Wolvaardt scored the most runs in the tournament (230) while England's Sophie Ecclestone took the most wickets (11). Australia's Ashleigh Gardner was named as the player of the tournament.

== Further expansions (2024–present) ==
In November 2021 as part of the 2024–2031 ICC men's hosts cycle, hosts for the 2024, 2026, 2028 and 2030 men's tournaments were announced. In July 2022 as part of the 2024–2027 ICC women's hosts cycle, hosts for the 2024 and 2026 women's tournaments were announced. The 2024 and 2026 men's tournaments were included in the 2023–2027 ICC Men's Future Tours Programme and the 2024–2027 ICC Associate Men's Future Tours Programme. The 2024 women's tournament was included in the 2022–2025 ICC Women's Future Tours Programme. The 2026 and 2028 women's tournaments were included in the 2025–2029 ICC Women's Future Tours Programme. The 2028 and 2030 men's tournaments will be included in the 2027–2031 ICC Men's Future Tours Programme .

=== 2024 ICC T20 World Cup ===
As the men's tournament expanded to 20 teams, the men's global qualifier was discontinued with the top teams from the regional qualifiers directly qualifying for the tournament. Top 8 teams from the 81 competed in the regional qualifiers along with the top eight teams from the previous (2022) tournament, two host teams and two teams from the T20I Rankings qualified for the Men's T20 World Cup. The women's qualifier was held in April – May 2024 in the United Arab Emirates featuring two last placed teams in the previous (2022) tournament, and 8 teams advanced from the [...] competed in the regional qualifiers. Top 2 teams from the qualifier qualified for the Women's T20 World Cup while, the top six teams from the previous (2022) tournament along with a host team and a team from the WT20I Rankings were given direct qualification.

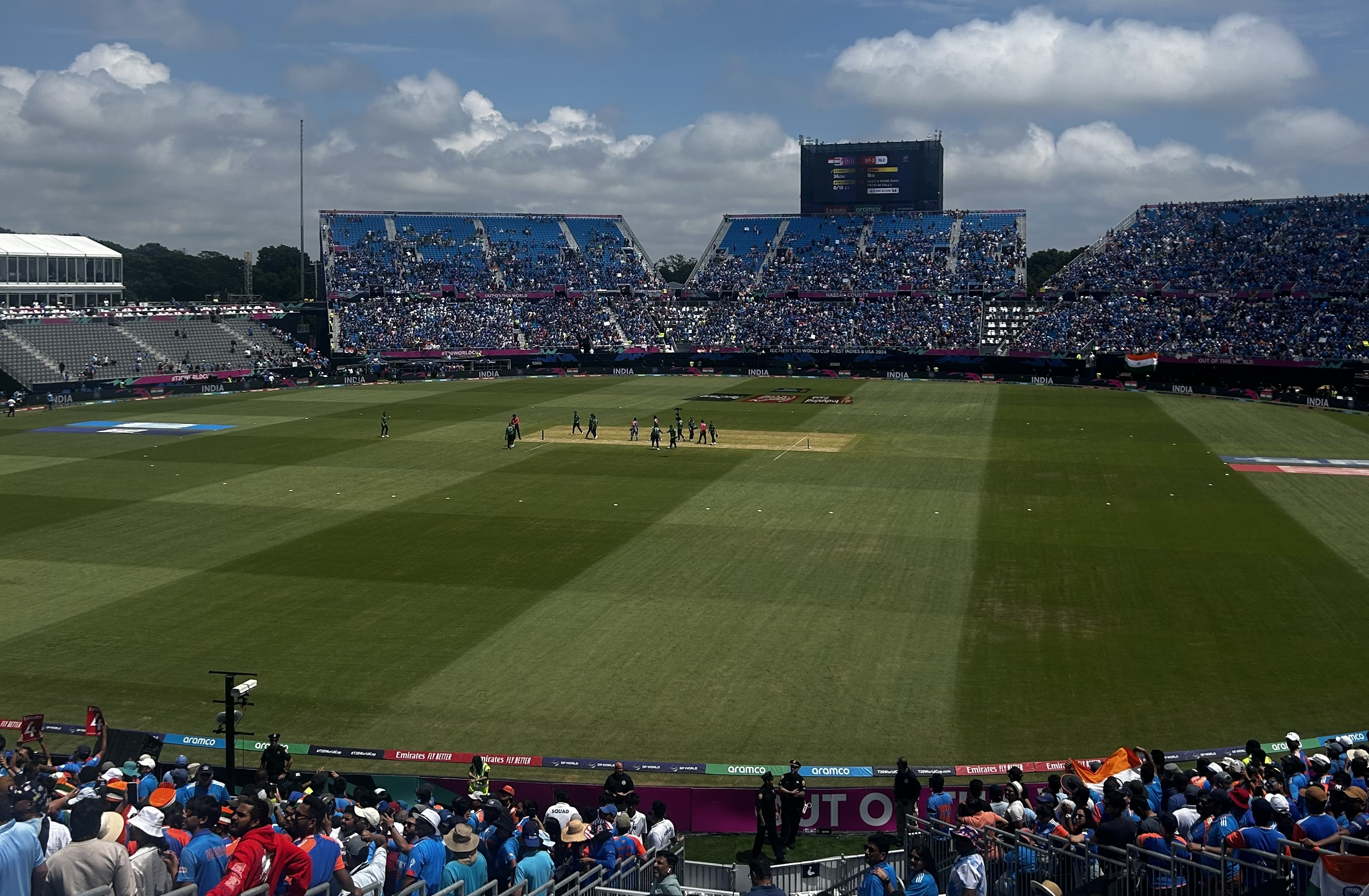
Nassau County International Cricket Stadium in East Meadow, New York during 2024 Men's T20 World Cup match between India and Ireland.

The men's tournament was held in the West Indies and the United States with a new expanded format: Twenty teams played in a round-robin group stage of four groups; from which two teams from each group advanced to the Super stage now called Super 8 stage with eight teams. Super 8 stage was played in a round-robin format of two groups; from which two teams from each group advanced to the knockout stage of four teams. It was the first major ICC tournament to include matches played in the United States. Canada, Uganda and the United States made their Men's T20 World Cup debuts. In the men's final, India defeated South Africa by 7 runs at Kensington Oval to become the champions of the 2024 men's tournament and the third team to win two Men's T20 World Cup titles. Afghanistan's Rahmanullah Gurbaz scored the most runs in the tournament (281) while Fazalhaq Farooqi and India's Arshdeep Singh were tied for taking the most wickets (17 each). India's Jasprit Bumrah was named as the player of the tournament.

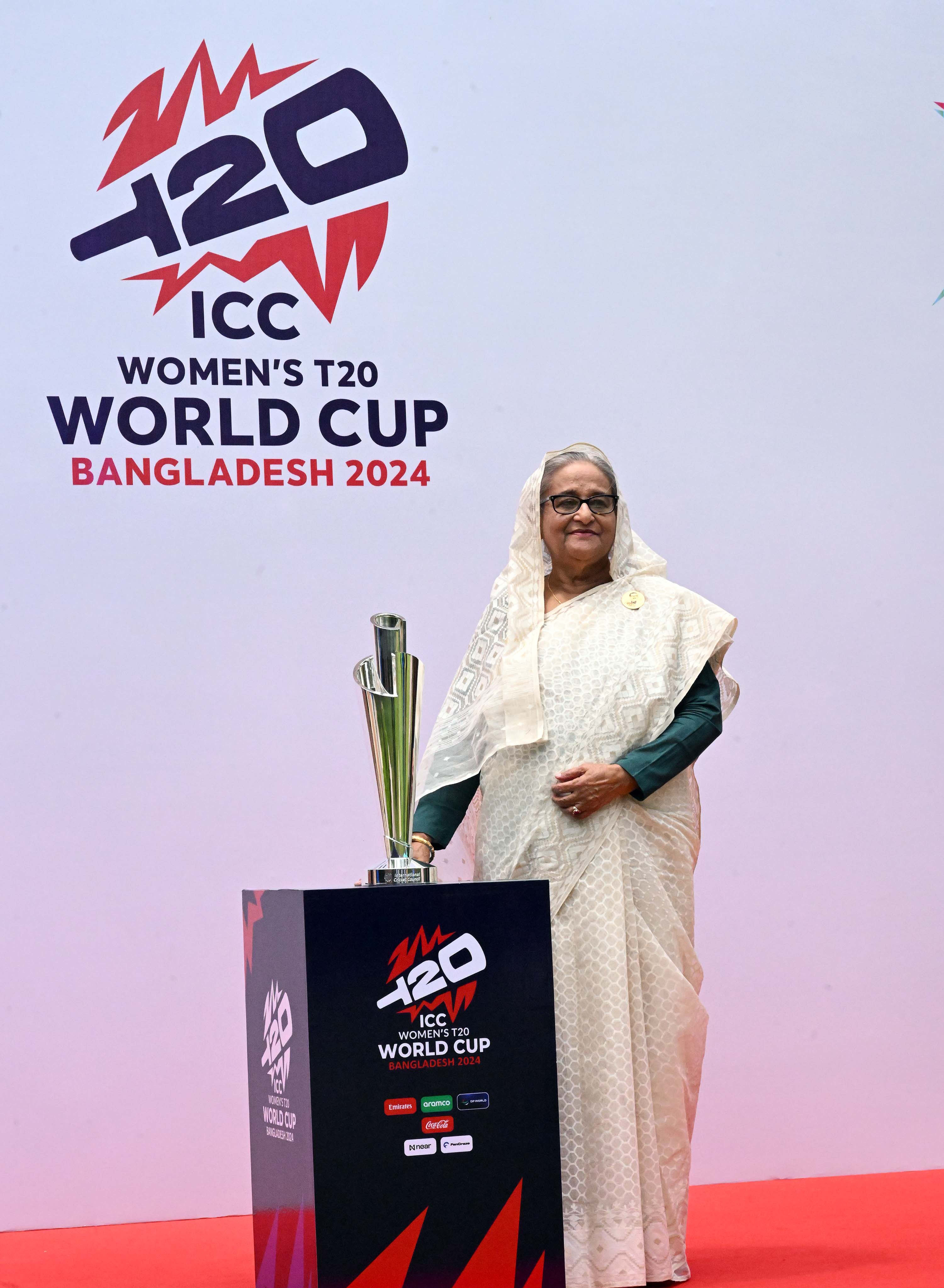
Former Bangladeshi Prime Minister Sheikh Hasina with the Women's T20 World Cup trophy.

The women's tournament was scheduled to be held in Bangladesh with the same format as previous years. However following the resignation of the Bangladeshi Prime Minister Sheikh Hasina and the violence it resulted in, the tournament was moved to the United Arab Emirates although the Bangladesh Cricket Board (BCB) remained as the formal host. Scotland made their Women's T20 World Cup debut. In the women's final, New Zealand defeated South Africa by 32 runs at Dubai International Cricket Stadium to become the champions of the 2024 women's tournament and win their maiden title. South Africa's Laura Wolvaardt scored the most runs in the tournament (223) while New Zealand's Amelia Kerr took the most wickets (15). Amelia Kerr was also named as the player of the tournament.

=== 2026 ICC T20 World Cup ===
Top 8 teams from the 87 competed in the regional qualifiers along with the top seven teams from the previous (2024) tournament, two host teams and three teams from the T20I Rankings qualified for the Men's T20 World Cup. The women's qualifier was held in January – February 2026 in Nepal featuring the two last placed teams in the previous (2024) tournament, and eight teams advanced from the regional qualifiers. The top four teams from the qualifier qualified for the Women's T20 World Cup, while the top six teams from the previous (2024) tournament including a host team and two teams from the WT20I Rankings were given direct qualification.

The men's tournament was held in India and Sri Lanka with the same format as 2024. Bangladesh had initially qualified for the tournament but, following the BCCI's decision to exclude Bangladeshi players from the 2026 Indian Premier League in response to the deterioration in relations between the two countries, the BCB requested for Bangladesh's matches at the World Cup to be moved from India, citing security concerns. The ICC however rejected the BCB's request and Bangladesh withdrew from the tournament. They were replaced by the next highest ranked team in the T20I Rankings: Scotland. Later, the Pakistani government directed the Pakistani team not to play its match against India in protest against the ICC's refusal to relocate Bangladesh's matches out of India. However following discussions between the ICC, PCB and BCB, the Pakistan government announced that it was directing the team to take part in the match. Italy made their Men's T20 World Cup debut. In the men's final, India defeated New Zealand by 96 runs at Narendra Modi Stadium in Ahmedabad to become the champions of the 2026 men's tournament, first host country to win the title and the first team to win three Men's T20 World Cup titles and two consecutive Men's T20 World Cups. Pakistan's Sahibzada Farhan scored the most runs in the tournament (383) while India's Jasprit Bumrah and Varun Chakravarthy were tied for taking the most wickets (14 each). India's Sanju Samson was named as the player of the tournament.

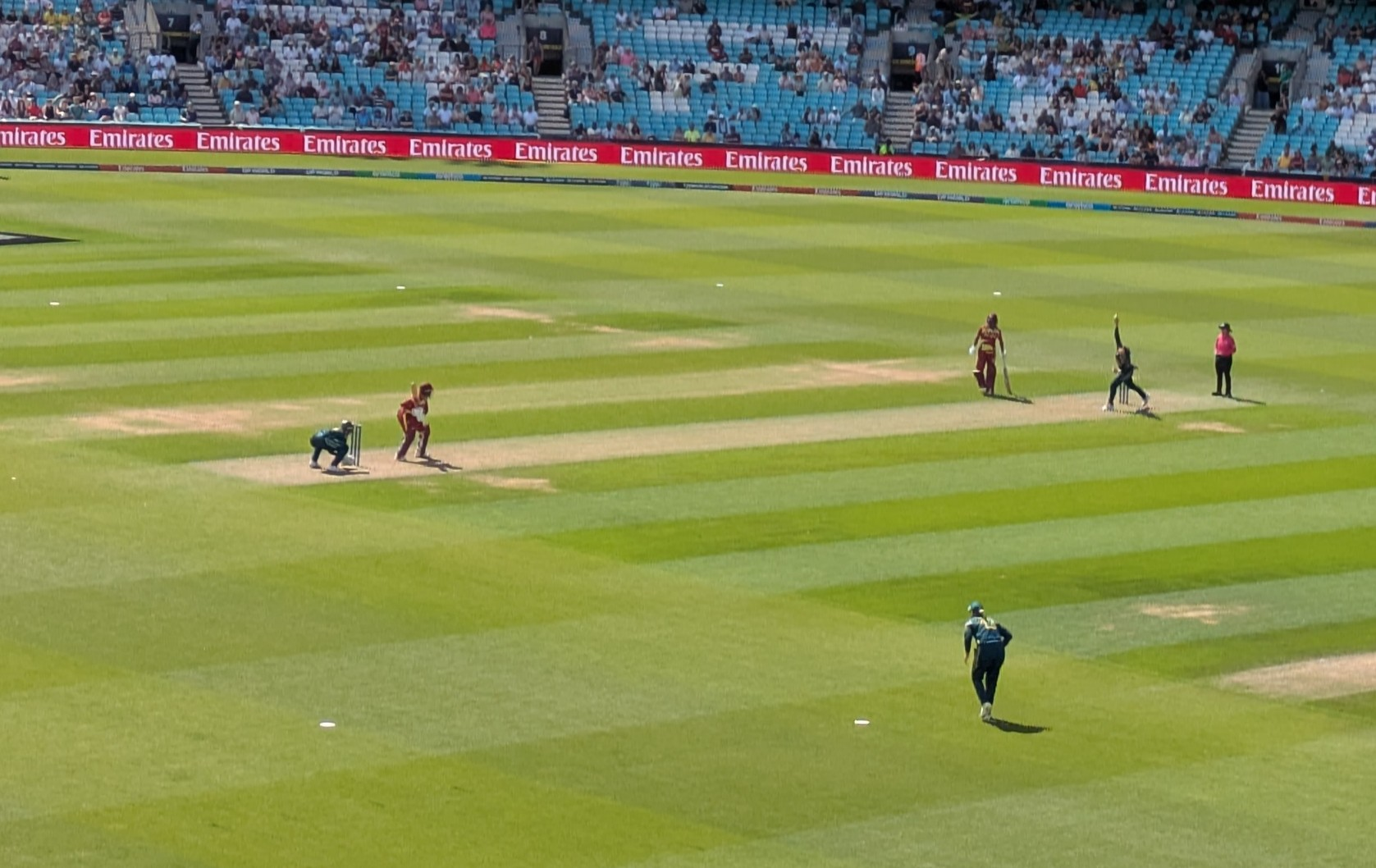
The Oval in London during 2026 Women's T20 World Cup semi-final 1 match between Australia and West Indies.

The women's tournament was held in England with an expanded format featuring twelve teams playing in a round-robin of two groups from which two teams from each group advanced to the knockout stage. Netherlands made their Women's T20 World Cup debut. In the women's final, Australia defeated England by seven wickets at Lord's to become the champions of the 2026 women's tournament and win their record-extending seventh title. England's Danni Wyatt-Hodge scored the most runs in the tournament (302) while India's Shree Charani took the most wickets (14). Australia's Beth Mooney was named as the player of the tournament, becoming the first player to be named as player of the match for the final and as the player of the tournament twice.

=== Future ===
The 2028 men's tournament will be held in Australia and New Zealand while the 2030 men's tournament will be held in England, Wales, Ireland and Scotland; both featuring 20 teams. The 2028 women's tournament will be held in Pakistan featuring 12 teams while the 2030 women's tournament will be expanded to feature 14 teams.

== Overview ==
=== Men's T20 World Cup ===
Details of Men's T20 World Cup tournaments
#	Year	Dates	Host(s)	Venues	Teams	Matches	Attendance	Ref.
1	2007	11 – 24 September 2007	Cricket South Africa	3 in South Africa	12	27	—N/a	
2	2009	5 – 21 June 2009	England and Wales Cricket Board	3 in England	12	27	—N/a	
3	2010	30 April – 16 May 2010	Cricket West Indies	3 in the West Indies	12	27	—N/a	
4	2012	18 September – 7 October 2012	Sri Lanka Cricket	3 in Sri Lanka	12	27	—N/a	
5	2014	16 March – 6 April 2014	Bangladesh Cricket Board	3 in Bangladesh	16	35	—N/a	
6	2016	8 March – 3 April 2016	Board of Control for Cricket in India	7 in India	16	35	—N/a	
7	2021	17 October – 14 November 2021	Board of Control for Cricket in India	3 in the United Arab Emirates; 1 in Oman	16	45	378,895	
8	2022	16 October – 13 November 2022	Cricket Australia	7 in Australia	16	45	751,775	
9	2024	1 – 29 June 2024	Cricket West Indies; USA Cricket	6 in the West Indies; 3 in the United States	20	55	190,000+ (Note: Over 190,000 in US alone.) (Note: Exact attendance figures are unknown.)	
10	2026	7 February – 8 March 2026	Board of Control for Cricket in India; Sri Lanka Cricket	5 in India; 3 in Sri Lanka	20	55	1.2 million+	
11	2028	21 October – 19 November 2028	Cricket Australia; New Zealand Cricket	TBA	20	55		

==== Men's T20 World Cup finals ====
Details of Men's T20 World Cup finals
Year	Final				Ref.
Year	Date & Venue	Winner	Victory margin	Runner-up	Ref.
2007	24 September 2007; Wanderers Stadium, Johannesburg	India; 157/5 (20 overs)	5 runs	Pakistan; 152 (19.4 overs)	
2009	21 June 2009; Lord's, London	Pakistan; 139/2 (18.4 overs)	8 wickets	Sri Lanka; 138/6 (20 overs)	
2010	16 May 2010; Kensington Oval, Bridgetown	England; 148/3 (17 overs)	7 wickets	Australia; 147/6 (20 overs)	
2012	7 October 2012; R. Premadasa Stadium, Colombo	West Indies; 137/6 (20 overs)	36 runs	Sri Lanka; 101 (18.4 overs)	
2014	6 April 2014; Sher-e-Bangla National Cricket Stadium, Dhaka	Sri Lanka; 134/4 (17.5 overs)	6 wickets	India; 130/4 (20 overs)	
2016	3 April 2016; Eden Gardens, Kolkata	West Indies; 161/6 (19.4 overs)	4 wickets	England; 155/9 (20 overs)	
2021	14 November 2021; Dubai International Cricket Stadium, Dubai	Australia; 173/2 (18.5 overs)	8 wickets	New Zealand; 172/4 (20 overs)	
2022	13 November 2022; Melbourne Cricket Ground, Melbourne	England; 138/5 (19 overs)	5 wickets	Pakistan; 137/8 (20 overs)	
2024	29 June 2024; Kensington Oval, Bridgetown	India; 176/7 (20 overs)	7 runs	South Africa; 169/8 (20 overs)	
2026	8 March 2026; Narendra Modi Stadium, Ahmedabad	India; 255/5 (20 overs)	96 runs	New Zealand; 159 (19 overs)	
2028	19 November 2028; Melbourne Cricket Ground, Melbourne	To be determined	TBD	To be determined	

=== Women's T20 World Cup ===
Details of Women's T20 World Cup tournaments
#	Year	Dates	Host(s)	Venues	Teams	Matches	Attendance	Ref.
1	2009	11 June – 21 June 2009	England and Wales Cricket Board	4 in England	8	15	—N/a	
2	2010	5 – 16 May 2010	Cricket West Indies	3 in the West Indies	8	15	—N/a	
3	2012	26 September – 7 October 2012	Sri Lanka Cricket	4 in Sri Lanka	8	17	—N/a	
4	2014	23 March – 6 April 2014	Bangladesh Cricket Board	2 in Bangladesh	10	27	—N/a	
5	2016	15 March – 3 April 2016	Board of Control for Cricket in India	8 in India	10	23	—N/a	
6	2018	9 – 24 November 2018	Cricket West Indies	3 in the West Indies	10	23	—N/a	
7	2020	21 February – 8 March 2020	Cricket Australia	6 in Australia	10	23	—N/a	
8	2023	10 – 26 February 2023	Cricket South Africa	3 in South Africa	10	23	—N/a	
9	2024	3 – 20 October 2024	Bangladesh Cricket Board	2 in the United Arab Emirates	10	23	—N/a	
10	2026	12 June – 5 July 2026	England and Wales Cricket Board	7 in England	12	33	—N/a	
11	2028	TBA	Pakistan Cricket Board	TBA	12	33		

==== Women's T20 World Cup finals ====
Details of Women's T20 World Cup finals
Year	Final				Ref.
Year	Date & Venue	Winner	Victory margin	Runner-up	Ref.
2009	21 June 2009; Lord's, London	England; 86/4 (17 overs)	6 wickets	New Zealand; 85 (20 overs)	
2010	16 May 2010; Kensington Oval, Bridgetown	Australia; 106/8 (20 overs)	3 runs	New Zealand; 103/6 (20 overs)	
2012	7 October 2012; R. Premadasa Stadium, Colombo	Australia; 142/4 (20 overs)	4 runs	England; 138/9 (20 overs)	
2014	6 April 2014; Sher-e-Bangla National Cricket Stadium, Dhaka	Australia; 106/4 (15.1 overs)	6 wickets	England; 105/8 (20 overs)	
2016	3 April 2016; Eden Gardens, Kolkata	West Indies; 149/2 (19.3 overs)	8 wickets	Australia; 148/5 (20 overs)	
2018	24 November 2018; Sir Vivian Richards Stadium, North Sound	Australia; 106/2 (15.1 overs)	8 wickets	England; 105 (19.4 overs)	
2020	8 March 2020; Melbourne Cricket Ground, Melbourne	Australia; 184/4 (20 overs)	85 runs	India; 99 (19.1 overs)	
2023	26 February 2023; Newlands Cricket Ground, Cape Town	Australia; 156/6 (20 overs)	19 runs	South Africa; 137/6 (20 overs)	
2024	20 October 2024; Dubai International Cricket Stadium, Dubai	New Zealand; 158/5 (20 overs)	32 runs	South Africa; 126/9 (20 overs)	
2026	5 July 2026; Lord's, London	Australia; 153/3 (17.1 overs)	7 wickets	England; 150/4 (20 overs)	

== See also ==
- ICC Future Tours Programme – International cricket scheduling that includes T20 World Cups.
- Men's T20 World Cup records
  - List of Men's T20 World Cup centuries
  - List of Men's T20 World Cup five-wicket hauls
- Men's T20 World Cup qualification
- Women's T20 World Cup records
- Women's T20 World Cup qualification
