= Men's T20 World Cup =

International cricket competition

ICC Men's T20 World Cup
- Administrator: International Cricket Council
- Format: Twenty20 International
- First edition: 2007: South Africa (as ICC World Twenty20)
- Latest edition: 2026: India & Sri Lanka
- Next edition: 2028: Australia & New Zealand
- Tournament format: see below
- Number of teams: 20
- Current champion: India (3rd title)
- Most successful: India (3 titles)
- Most runs: (India) Virat Kohli (1,292)
- Most wickets: (Bangladesh) Shakib Al Hasan (50)
- Website: t20worldcup.com

The ICC Men's T20 World Cup, formerly the ICC World Twenty20, is a biennial world cup for cricket in Twenty20 International (T20I) format, organised by the International Cricket Council (ICC). It was held in every odd year from 2007 to 2009, and since 2010 has been held in every even year with the exception of 2018 and 2020. In 2018, the tournament was rebranded from the World Twenty20 to the Men's T20 World Cup.

The 2011 edition of the tournament was brought forward to 2010 to replace the ICC Champions Trophy. In May 2016, the ICC put forward the idea of having a tournament in 2018, with South Africa being the possible host country, but later dropped the idea due to multiple bilateral series taking place that year. The 2020 edition of the tournament was scheduled to take place in Australia but due to the COVID-19 pandemic, the tournament was postponed until 2021, with the intended host changed to India. The 2021 Men's T20 World Cup was later relocated to the United Arab Emirates and Oman due to problems relating to the COVID-19 pandemic in India, taking place five years after the previous (2016) edition.

As of 2026, ten editions have been played; a total of 25 teams have competed and six teams have won the T20 World Cup. India (2007, 2024, 2026) are the most successful team with three titles. West Indies (2012, 2016) and England (2010, 2022) have won it twice, while Pakistan (2009), Sri Lanka (2014), and Australia (2021) have one title each. A total of 15 countries have hosted the tournament (including 6 island nations of the West Indies). India are the current champions, having won their third title in the 2026 edition. The next edition of the tournament will take place in Australia and New Zealand in 2028.

== History ==
=== Background ===
When the Benson & Hedges Cup ended in 2002, the England and Wales Cricket Board (ECB) sought another one-day competition to appeal to the younger generation in response to dwindling crowds and reduced sponsorship. The Board wanted to deliver fast-paced, exciting cricket accessible to fans who were put off by the longer versions of the game. Stuart Robertson, the marketing manager of the ECB, proposed a 20-over per innings game to county chairmen in 2001, and they voted 11–7 in favour of adopting the new format. The first official Twenty20 matches were played on 13 June 2003 between the English counties in the T20 Blast's inaugural edition. The first season of Twenty20 in England was a relative success, with Surrey defeating Warwickshire by 9 wickets in the final to claim the title. The first Twenty20 match held at Lord's, on 15 July 2004 between Middlesex and Surrey, attracted a crowd of 26,500, the largest attendance for any county cricket game at the ground since 1953. On 17 February 2005, Australia defeated New Zealand in the first men's full international Twenty20 match, played at Eden Park in Auckland.

=== Initial years (2007–2012) ===
The first tournament was in 2007 in South Africa where India defeated Pakistan in the final. In December 2007 it was decided to hold a qualifying tournament with a 20-over format to better prepare the teams. The 2009 tournament in England was won by Pakistan who defeated Sri Lanka in the final. The third tournament, was brought forward to 2010 from 2011 to replace the ICC Champions Trophy. This scheduling bottleneck was caused after the 5th edition of the ICC Champions Trophy, scheduled to be hosted by Pakistan in 2008, was delayed and shifted to South Africa in 2009 due to security concerns. The Champions Trophy was converted into a quadrennial tournament after that. The third World Twenty20 was held in the West Indies in May 2010, where England defeated Australia by 7 wickets in the final. The 2012 tournament in Sri Lanka was won by West Indies who defeated Sri Lanka in the final.

=== Expansion to 16 teams (2014–2016) ===
The 2012 tournament was to be expanded into a 16-team format, however this was reverted to 12. The 2014 tournament in Bangladesh, was the first to feature 16 teams including all ten full members and six associate members who qualified through the 2013 Qualifier. Sri Lanka won the 2014 tournament after defeating India in the final. The 2016 tournament in India was won by West Indies, who became the first team to win two T20 World Cups after defeating England in the final.

=== Disruptions and rebranding (2018–2022) ===
In May 2016, the ICC proposed a World Twenty20 tournament in 2018, with South Africa being the possible host, but this was later dropped as the top member nations were busy with multiple bilateral tour matches that year. In November 2018, as part of a goal to heighten the profile of the World Twenty20 tournaments, the ICC announced that they would be rebranded as the "T20 World Cup" beginning in 2020. Initially, Australia was set to host both the men's and women's tournaments in 2020, however in July 2020, the ICC announced that the 2020 tournament had been postponed to 2021 due to the COVID-19 pandemic and with Australian international travel restrictions not expected to be lifted until 2021. Later, the ICC chose to relocate the tournament to India, and award Australia the 2022 edition as compensation. Due to concerns over the COVID-19 pandemic in India, the tournament was played at venues in the United Arab Emirates and Oman instead, although India remained as the formal host. The 2021 tournament was won by Australia, who won their maiden T20 World Cup title after defeating New Zealand in the final. The 2022 tournament was won by England, who won their second T20 World Cup title after defeating Pakistan in the final.

=== Expansion to 20 teams (2024–present) ===
In June 2021, the ICC announced that the Men's T20 World Cup would expand to 20 teams beginning in 2024, divided into four groups of five each for the group stage. The 2024 tournament was hosted by the West Indies and the United States. It was the first time the US had hosted a major ICC event. In the final, India defeated South Africa to win their second T20 World Cup title after 17 years. The 2026 tournament was hosted by India and Sri Lanka; where India defeated New Zealand in the final to become the first team to win three titles and the first host country to win the title.

== Hosts ==
Host countries of Men's T20 World Cup

The ICC's executive committee votes for the hosts of the tournament after examining bids from the nations which have expressed an interest in holding the event. After South Africa in 2007, the tournament was hosted by England, the West Indies, Sri Lanka, Bangladesh and India in 2010, 2012, 2014 and 2016 respectively. After a gap of four years, Australia was set to host the 2020 edition, but it was postponed to 2021, relocated to India and played in UAE and Oman due to the COVID-19 pandemic. The 2022 tournament was hosted by Australia. In November 2021 as part of the 2024–2031 men's hosts cycle, the ICC confirmed the hosts for the next four Men's T20 World Cup tournaments from 2024 to 2030. The West Indies and United States would co-host the 2024 edition, India and Sri Lanka to co-host the 2026 edition, Australia and New Zealand to host the 2028 edition and the 2030 edition is to be co-hosted by England, Wales, Ireland and Scotland.

Summary of hosts by ICC region (2007–2030)
Region	Year	Hosting body	Host(s)
Africa	2007	Cricket South Africa	South Africa
Americas	2010	Cricket West Indies	West Indies
Americas	2024	Cricket West Indies; USA Cricket	West Indies; United States
Asia	2012	Sri Lanka Cricket	Sri Lanka
Asia	2014	Bangladesh Cricket Board	Bangladesh
Asia	2016	Board of Control for Cricket in India	India
Asia	2021	Board of Control for Cricket in India	United Arab Emirates; Oman
Asia	2026	Board of Control for Cricket in India; Sri Lanka Cricket	India; Sri Lanka
East Asia-Pacific	2022	Cricket Australia	Australia
East Asia-Pacific	2028	Cricket Australia; New Zealand Cricket	Australia; New Zealand
Europe	2009	England and Wales Cricket Board	England
Europe	2030	England and Wales Cricket Board; Cricket Ireland; Cricket Scotland	England; Wales; Ireland; Scotland

== Format ==
=== Qualification ===
For the inaugural tournament in 2007, ten then full members qualified directly for the tournament along with the top two teams from the 2007 WCL Division One. A separate qualifier (later named global qualifier) for teams advanced from the World Cricket League, was introduced for the 2009 tournament through which top two associates qualified for the World Twenty20 while, all ten full members were given direct qualification. A new expanded pathway was introduced for the 2012 tournament with the introduction of regional qualifiers. All associate nations competed in the regional competitions for a spot in the global qualifier from which top associates qualified for the World Twenty20 while, all ten full members were given direct qualification.

A new qualification pathway was introduced in 2019 following the rebranding as T20 World Cup. A stipulated number of top teams from the T20I Rankings directly qualified for the T20 World Cup, while all other teams competed in two-stage regional qualifiers (sub-regional qualifiers and regional finals) for a spot in the global qualifier from which teams advanced to the T20 World Cup. From the 2022 tournament onwards, direct qualification is given to the top teams from the previous tournament and T20I Rankings. Following the T20 World Cup's expansion to 20 teams from the 2024 tournament onwards, the global qualifiers were discontinued with the top teams from regional qualifiers qualifying for the T20 World Cup. An expanded global qualifier will be introduced for the 2028 tournament, in which teams advanced from the regional qualifiers along with the bottom teams from the previous T20 World Cup will compete to determine the final entrants.

=== Tournament ===
The T20 World Cup is played in three stages. The preliminary stage or group stage is played by 2 (2014–2022), 4 (2007–2012; 2024–2026) or 6 (2028 onwards) groups in a round-robin format. The second round known as Super 8 (2007–2012; 2024–2026), Super 10 (2014–2016; 2028 onwards) and Super 12 (2021–2022) is also played by 2 groups in a round-robin format. In both the preliminary round and the Super round, teams are ranked based on: 1) Points; 2) Wins; 3) Net run rate; 4) Results of games between tied teams; 5) T20I rankings ahead of the respective tournament. The third round was played as a knockout stage of four teams from 2007 to 2026 and will be played as a knockout stage of six teams from 2026 onwards. In case of a tie (that is, both teams scoring the same number of runs at the end of their respective innings), a Super Over is used to decide the winner sice 2009. In the case of a tie occurring again in the Super Over, subsequent super overs would be played until there is a winner. Prior to 2019, the match would be won by the team that had scored the most boundaries in their innings. During the 2007 tournament, a bowl-out was used to decide the winner of tied matches.

Summary of tournament formats (2007–2028)
#	Year	Teams	Matches	Preliminary stage	Super stage	Final stage
1	2007	12	27	4 groups of 3 teams: 12 matches	Super 8 stage 2 groups of 4 teams: 12 matches	Knockout of 4 teams: 3 matches
2	2009	12	27	4 groups of 3 teams: 12 matches	Super 8 stage 2 groups of 4 teams: 12 matches	Knockout of 4 teams: 3 matches
3	2010	12	27	4 groups of 3 teams: 12 matches	Super 8 stage 2 groups of 4 teams: 12 matches	Knockout of 4 teams: 3 matches
4	2012	12	27	4 groups of 3 teams: 12 matches	Super 8 stage 2 groups of 4 teams: 12 matches	Knockout of 4 teams: 3 matches
5	2014	16 (8 direct qualified for Super 10/12)	35	2 groups of 4 teams: 12 matches	Super 10 stage 2 groups of 5 teams: 20 matches	Knockout of 4 teams: 3 matches
6	2016	16 (8 direct qualified for Super 10/12)	35	2 groups of 4 teams: 12 matches	Super 10 stage 2 groups of 5 teams: 20 matches	Knockout of 4 teams: 3 matches
7	2021	16 (8 direct qualified for Super 10/12)	45	2 groups of 4 teams: 12 matches	Super 12 stage 2 groups of 6 teams: 30 matches	Knockout of 4 teams: 3 matches
8	2022	16 (8 direct qualified for Super 10/12)	45	2 groups of 4 teams: 12 matches	Super 12 stage 2 groups of 6 teams: 30 matches	Knockout of 4 teams: 3 matches
9	2024	20	55	4 groups of 5 teams: 40 matches	Super 8 stage 2 groups of 4 teams: 12 matches	Knockout of 4 teams: 3 matches
10	2026	20	55	4 groups of 5 teams: 40 matches	Super 8 stage 2 groups of 4 teams: 12 matches	Knockout of 4 teams: 3 matches
11	2028	20	55	5 groups of 4 teams: 30 matches	Super 10 stage 2 groups of 5 teams: 20 matches	Knockout of 6 teams: 5 matches

== Trophy ==
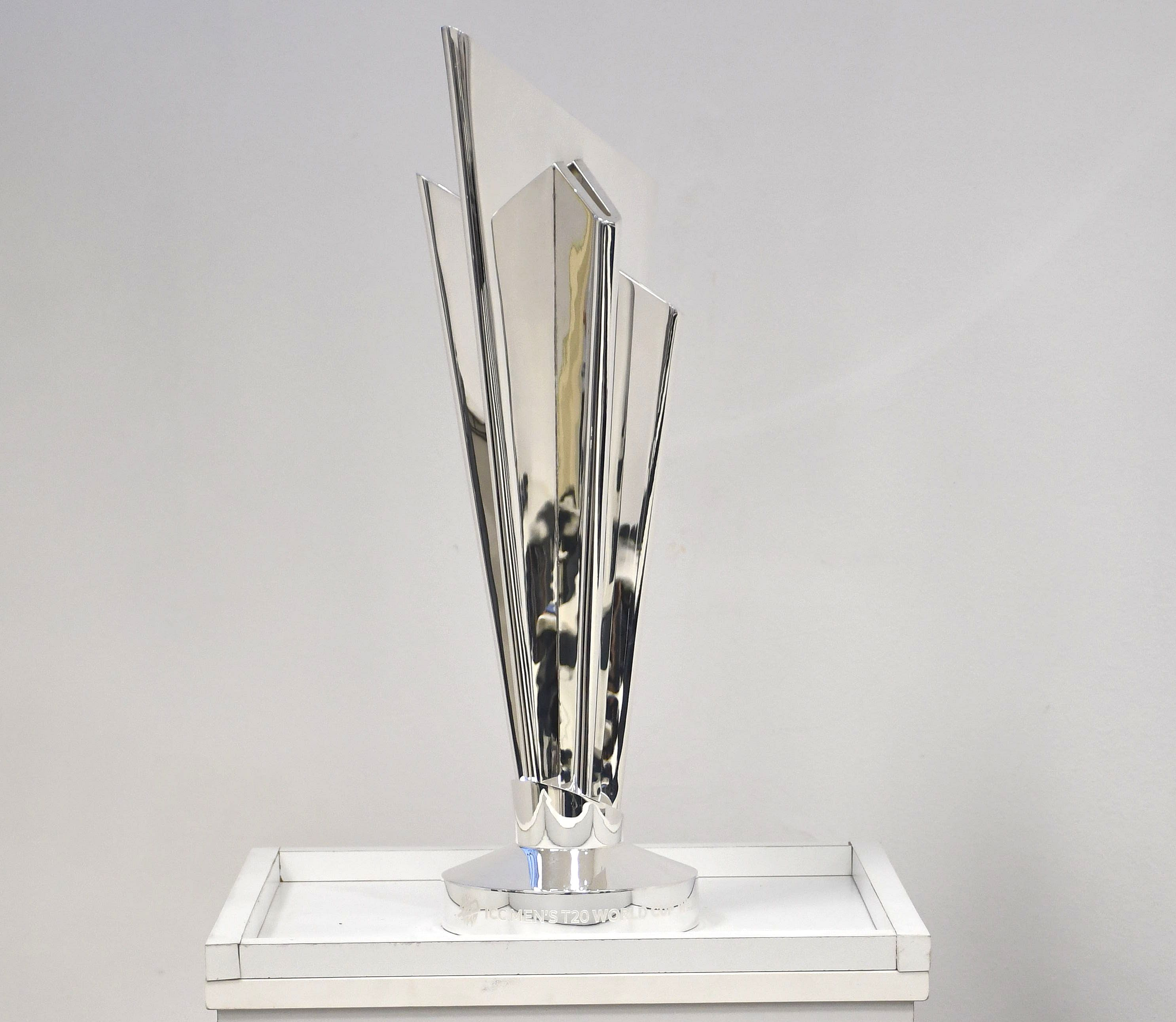
ICC Men's T20 World Cup Trophy

The ICC Men's T20 World Cup Trophy is presented to the winners of the final. It is made of silver and rhodium and weighs approximately 12 kg (26 lb) and stands 57.15 cm (22.50 in) tall, with a width of 16.5 cm (6.5 in) at the top and 13.97 cm (5.50 in) at the base. It was designed in 2007 by Minale Bryce Design Strategy, based in Queensland, Australia. The trophy was initially manufactured by Amit Pabuwal in India, and then in 2012, Links of London became the manufacturer of the trophy. In 2021, Thomas Lyte became the official manufacturer of the trophy.

== Attendance ==
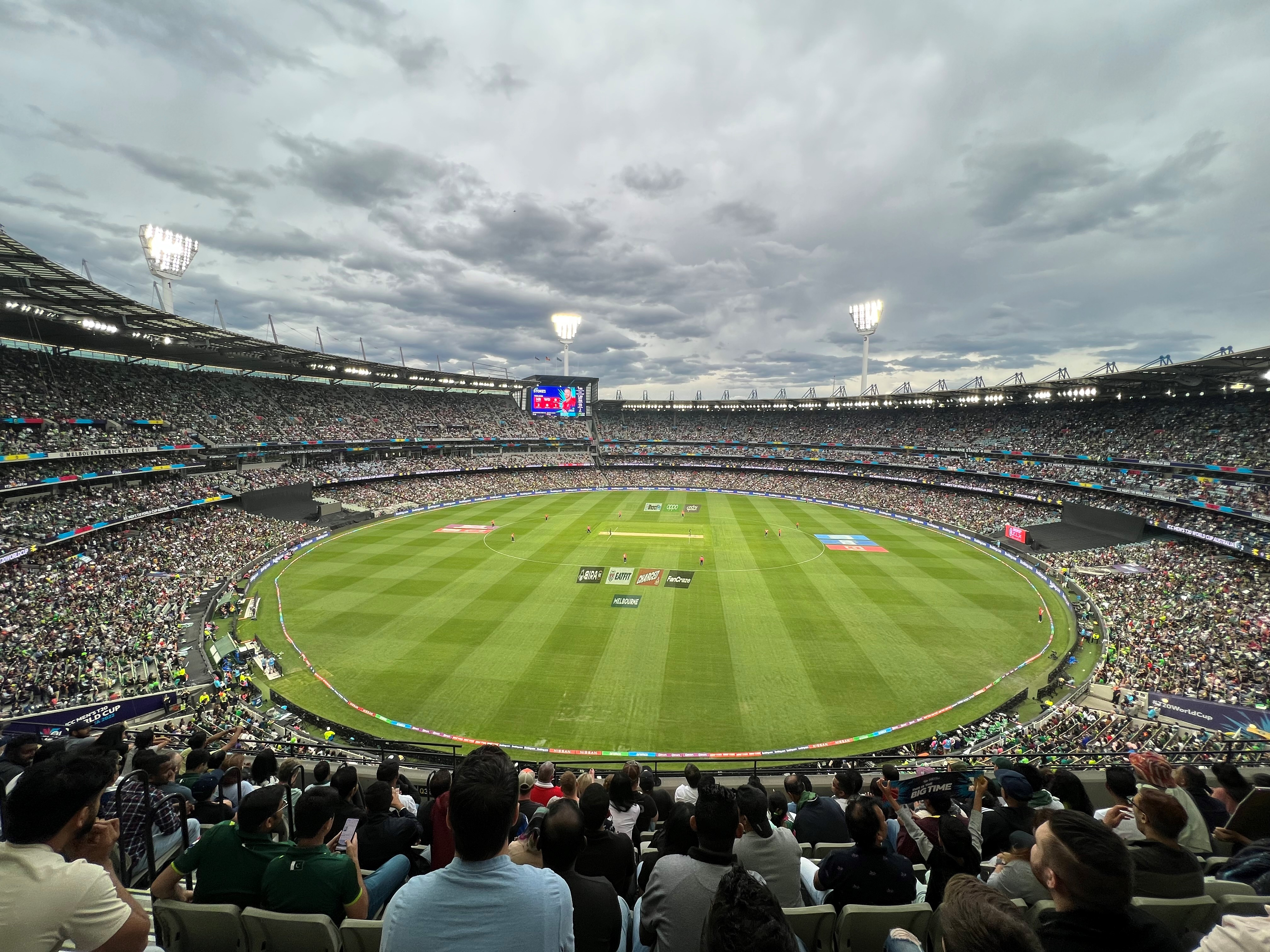
80,428 spectators attended the 2022 final between Pakistan and England at the MCG.

Year	Total attendance	Ref.
2021	378,895	
2022	751,775	
2024	190,000+ (Note: Over 190,000 in US alone.) (Note: Exact attendance figures are unknown.)	
2026	1.2 million+	

== Summary ==
As of the 2026 tournament, twenty-five nations have played in the T20 World Cup. Eight teams have competed in every tournament, six of whom have won the title. India has won the title thrice; England and the West Indies have won the title twice each, while Australia, Pakistan, and Sri Lanka have won the title once each. India has made four final appearances, while England, India and Pakistan have each made six semi-final appearances.

India is the only nation to have won the tournament as the hosts and defended their title in the following edition (both in 2026). Kensington Oval in Bridgetown, Barbados is the only venue to have hosted more than one final (2010 and 2024). All Test-playing nations made their debuts in the inaugural edition with the exception of Ireland and Afghanistan, who were still associate members at the time and made their debuts in the 2009 and 2010 editions respectively. Kenya and Scotland were the only non-Test playing nations to be featured in the inaugural edition. A total of thirteen different associate teams have qualified for the competition since, with the current format ensuring that at least eight qualify for each tournament.

=== Final results ===
Year	Winners		Runners-up		Ref.
2007	India	157/5 (20 overs)	Pakistan	152 (19.4 overs)	
2009	Pakistan	139/2 (18.4 overs)	Sri Lanka	138/6 (20 overs)	
2010	England	148/3 (17 overs)	Australia	147/6 (20 overs)	
2012	West Indies	137/6 (20 overs)	Sri Lanka	101 (18.4 overs)	
2014	Sri Lanka	134/4 (17.5 overs)	India	130/4 (20 overs)	
2016	West Indies (2)	161/6 (19.4 overs)	England	155/9 (20 overs)	
2021	Australia	173/2 (18.5 overs)	New Zealand	172/4 (20 overs)	
2022	England (2)	138/5 (19 overs)	Pakistan	137/8 (20 overs)	
2024	India (2)	176/7 (20 overs)	South Africa	169/8 (20 overs)	
2026	India (3)	255/5 (20 overs)	New Zealand	159 (19 overs)	

=== Team performance ===
The table below provides a summary of the performances of teams over past T20 World Cups, as of the end of the 2024 tournament. Teams are ordered by best result then by appearances, and then alphabetically.

Current Test playing nations / ICC full members are indicated by a dagger symbol (†).

- Source: Cricinfo

Team	Appearances	Best performance
India†	10	Champions (2007, 2024, 2026)
England†	10	Champions (2010, 2022)
West Indies†	10	Champions (2012, 2016)
Australia†	10	Champions (2021)
Pakistan†	10	Champions (2009)
Sri Lanka†	10	Champions (2014)
New Zealand†	10	Runners-up (2021, 2026)
South Africa†	10	Runners-up (2024)
Afghanistan†	8	Semi-finals (2024)
Bangladesh†	9	Super 8s (2007, 2024)
Ireland†	9	Super 8s (2009)
Zimbabwe†	7	Super 8s (2026)
United States	2	Super 8s (2024)
Netherlands	7	Super 10s (2014)
Scotland	7	Super 12s (2021)
Namibia	4	Super 12s (2021)
Oman	4	First round (2016, 2021, 2024, 2026)
Nepal	3	First round (2014, 2024, 2026)
United Arab Emirates	3	First round (2014, 2022, 2026)
Canada	2	First round (2024, 2026)
Hong Kong	2	First round (2014, 2016)
Papua New Guinea	2	First round (2021, 2024)
Italy	1	First round (2026)
Kenya	1	First round (2007)
Uganda	1	First round (2024)

== Records ==
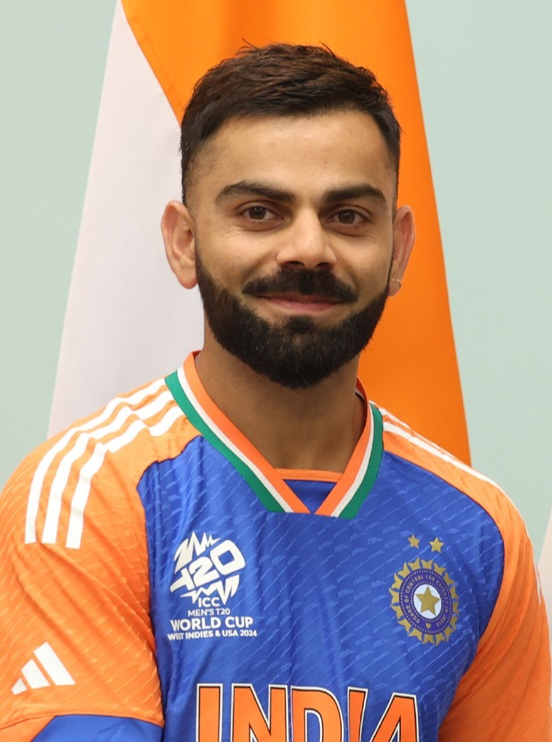
Former Indian captain Virat Kohli has scored the most runs (1,292), highest average (58.72) and most 50+ scores (15) in the T20 World Cup.

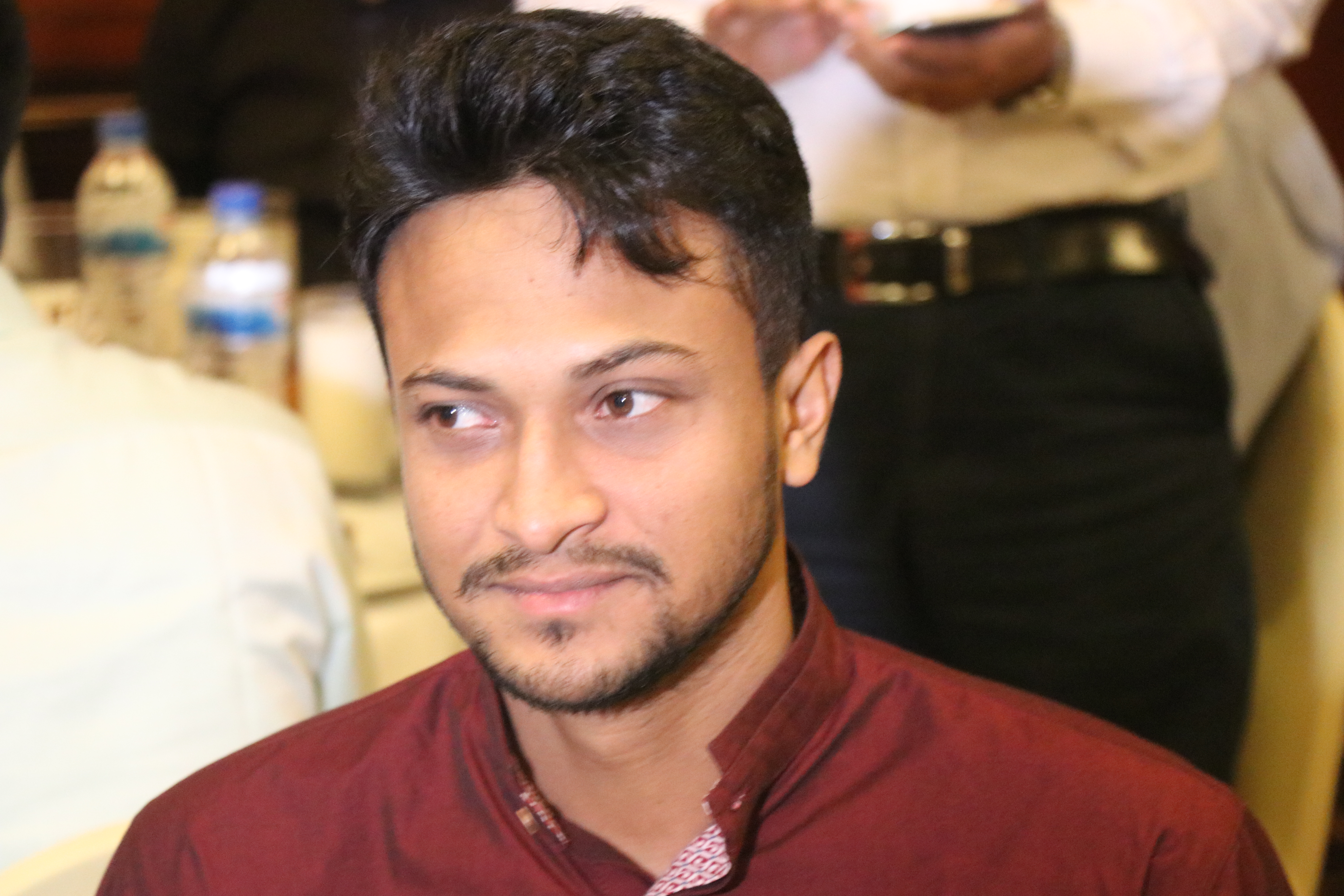
Shakib Al Hasan of Bangladesh has taken the most wickets (50) in the T20 World Cup.

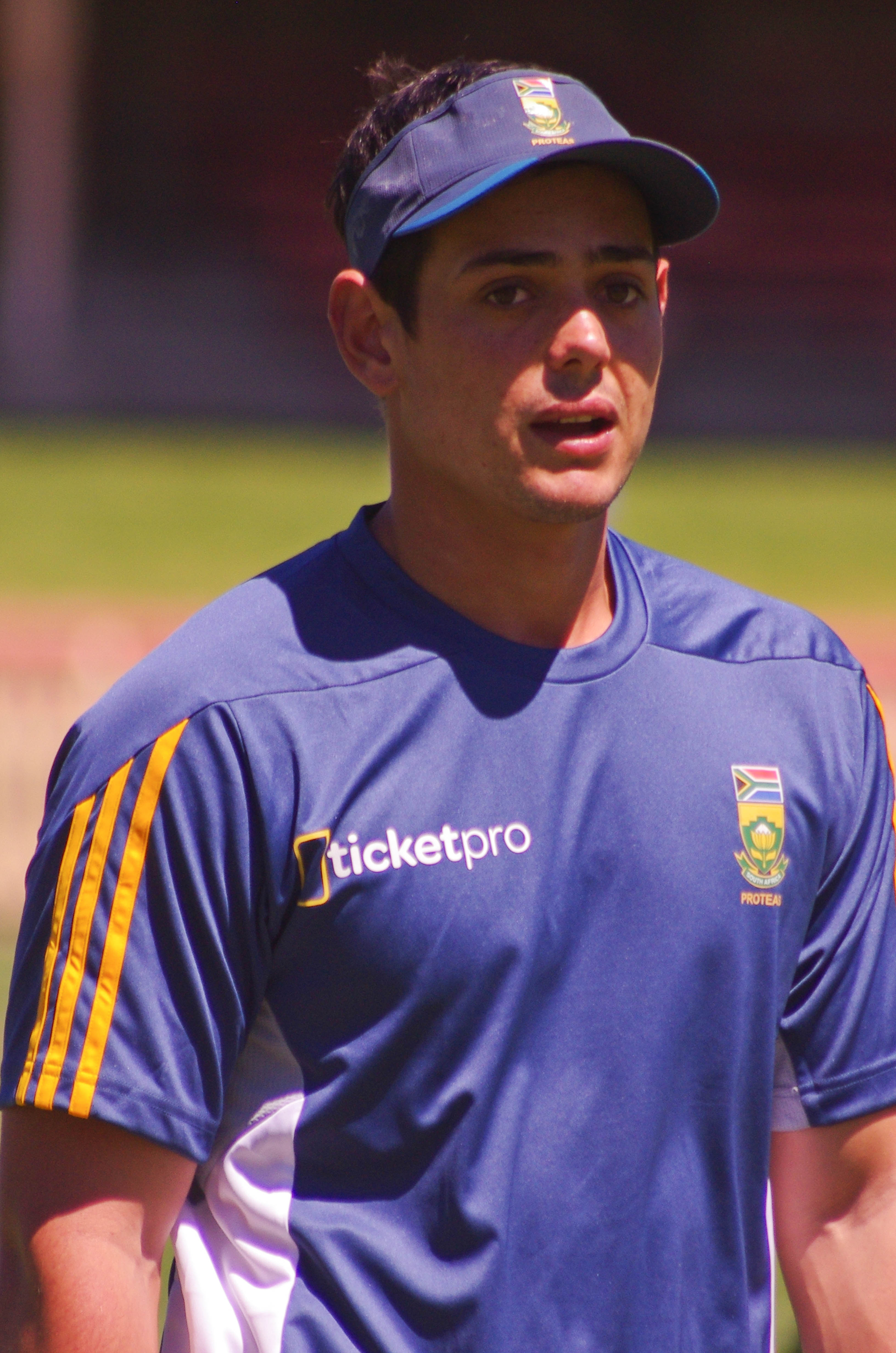
Quinton de Kock of South Africa has taken the most dismissals for a wicket keeper (39) in the T20 World Cup.

As of the 2026 tournament, former Indian captain Rohit Sharma and Shakib Al Hasan of Bangladesh are the only players to have appeared in nine out of ten editions of the T20 World Cup. However, Brendan Taylor of Zimbabwe is the only cricketer to play in the inaugural (2007) and the tenth (2026) edition of the T20 World Cup. Rohit Sharma also holds the record for most appearances in T20 World Cup matches (47), while MS Dhoni holds the record for most T20 World Cup matches as a captain (33). Virat Kohli has won the most player of the match awards in T20 World Cups (8). R. Premadasa Stadium in Colombo, Sri Lanka has hosted most T20 World Cup matches (23). Australian umpire Rod Tucker has umpired the most T20 World Cup matches (52), while Simon Taufel has umpired the most T20 World Cup finals (3). India and England scored the highest match aggregate of 499/14 in 2026. India has the highest victory percentage in T20 World Cups (73.33%).

Former Indian captain Virat Kohli holds the records for most runs (1,292), and most 50+ scores (15), while Chris Gayle of West Indies and Sahibzada Farhan of Pakistan shares the record for most centuries (2 each); Farhan also holds the record most runs in a tournament (383 in 2026). Shakib Al Hasan holds the record for most wickets (50), while Fazalhaq Farooqi of Afghanistan and Arshdeep Singh of India shares the record for most wickets in a tournament (17 in 2024). Pat Cummins is the only player to have taken more than one hat-trick and has taken 2 hat-tricks both in 2024. Quinton de Kock of South Africa holds the record for most dismissals by a wicket-keeper (39) and David Warner of Australia hold the record for most catches by a fielder (25). Former West Indies captain Daren Sammy holds the record for most T20 World Cup titles as a captain, while Marlon Samuels holds the record for most player of the final awards (both in 2012 and 2016).

=== Team records ===
Record for	Record holder	Record	Tournament(s)	Ref.
Highest team total	Sri Lanka (v Kenya) at Johannesburg	260/6	2007	
Lowest team total	Netherlands (v Sri Lanka) at Chittagong	39	2014	
Lowest team total	Uganda (v West Indies) at Guyana	39	2024	
Highest match aggregate	India v England at Mumbai	499/14	2026	
Lowest match aggregate	Netherlands v Sri Lanka at Chittagong	79/11	2014	

=== Batting records ===
Record for	Record holder	Record	Tournament(s)	Ref.
Most runs	(India) Virat Kohli	1,292	2012 – 2024	
Most runs in a tournament	(Pakistan) Sahibzada Farhan	383	2026	
Highest score	(New Zealand) Brendon McCullum v Bangladesh at Kandy	123	2012	
Most centuries	(Cricket West Indies) Chris Gayle	2	2007 – 2021	
Most centuries	(Pakistan) Sahibzada Farhan	2	2026	
Highest partnership	(Pakistan) Sahibzada Farhan & Fakhar Zaman v Sri Lanka at Kandy	176	2026	

=== Bowling records ===
Record for	Record holder	Record	Tournament(s)	Ref.
Most wickets	(Bangladesh) Shakib Al Hasan	50	2007–2024	
Most wickets in a tournament	(Afghanistan) Fazalhaq Farooqi and (India) Arshdeep Singh	17	2024	
Best bowling figures	(Sri Lanka) Ajantha Mendis v Zimbabwe at Hambantota	6/8	2012	

=== Fielding records ===
Record for	Record holder	Record	Tournament(s)	Ref.
Most wicket-keeper dismissals	(South Africa) Quinton de Kock	39	2014 – 2026	
Most wicket-keeper dismissals in a tournament	(India) Rishabh Pant	14	2024	
Most catches	(Australia) David Warner	25	2009 – 2024	
