= 2021 Men's T20 World Cup final =

Cricket match

2021 ICC Men's T20 World Cup Final
- Match programme cover
- Event: 2021 ICC Men's T20 World Cup
New Zealand	Australia
172/4	173/2
20 overs	18.5 overs
- Australia won by 8 wickets
- Date: 14 November 2021
- Venue: Dubai International Cricket Stadium, Dubai
- Player of the match: Mitchell Marsh (Aus)
- Umpires: Marais Erasmus (SA) and Richard Kettleborough (Eng)

The 2021 Men's T20 World Cup final was a day/night Twenty20 International cricket match played at Dubai International Cricket Stadium in Dubai, UAE, on 14 November 2021 to determine the winner of the 2021 ICC Men's T20 World Cup. Previously, the Melbourne Cricket Ground in Melbourne was scheduled to host the final on 15 November 2020 but later the whole tournament was postponed and rescheduled due to the COVID-19 pandemic in 2020. The match was played between New Zealand and Australia, with both the teams yet to win their first T20 World Cup title. Australia won the match by 8 wickets to win their maiden T20 World Cup title.

== Background ==
Originally, the preceding 2020 Men's T20 World Cup was scheduled to be held in Australia from 18 October to 15 November 2020, but was postponed due to COVID-19 pandemic. Later, it was planned to be hosted by India as 2021 Men's T20 World Cup, with Australia being named as the host for the succeeding 2022 Men's T20 World Cup. In June 2021, the International Cricket Council (ICC) confirmed that the tournament was moved to UAE and Oman due to a possible third wave of the pandemic in India, with the Board of Control for Cricket in India (BCCI) would remain as the hosts of the tournament irrespective of the location. Eight teams played in the First round as two groups A and B, with top two teams from each group advanced to the Super 12 stage. Super 12 stage was played in two groups 1 and 2, with the top two teams from each Super 12 group advanced to the semi-finals. After finishing second in the Super 12 Group 2, New Zealand became the first team to reach the final, by winning the first semi-final against England by five wickets. With the second-place finish in Super 12 Group 1, Australia beat Pakistan by 5 wickets in the second semi-final to reach the final.

New Zealand's Devon Conway was ruled out of his country's team after breaking his hand during the semi-final match against England.

It was a repeat of the 2015 World Cup Final where Australia defeated New Zealand to become world champions for the 5th time. This was New Zealand's first T20 World Cup final while Australia's second after 2010 where they lost to England.

== Road to the final ==
Australia		Round	New Zealand
Opponent	Result	Super 12 stage	Opponent	Result
South Africa	Australia won by 5 wickets	Match 1	Pakistan	Pakistan won by 5 wickets
Sri Lanka	Australia won by 7 wickets	Match 2	India	New Zealand won by 8 wickets
England	England won by 8 wickets	Match 3	Scotland	New Zealand won by 16 runs
Bangladesh	Australia won by 8 wickets	Match 4	Namibia	New Zealand won by 52 runs
West Indies	Australia won by 8 wickets	Match 5	Afghanistan	New Zealand won by 8 wickets
Super 12 Group 1 2nd Place: Pos / Team / P / W / L / NR / Pts / NRR / Qualification; 2 / Australia / 5 / 4 / 1 / 0 / 8 / 1.216 / Advanced to Semi-final 2		Final group standings	Super 12 Group 2 2nd Place: Pos / Team / P / W / L / NR / Pts / NRR / Qualification; 2 / New Zealand / 5 / 4 / 1 / 0 / 8 / 1.162 / Advanced to Semi-final 1
Semi-final 2		Knockout stage	Semi-final 1
Opponent	Result		Opponent	Result
Pakistan	Australia won by 5 wickets		England	New Zealand won by 5 wickets
2021 ICC Men's T20 World Cup Final

== Match ==
=== Match officials ===
- On-field Umpires: Marais Erasmus (SA) and Richard Kettleborough (Eng)
- TV umpire: Nitin Menon (Ind)
- Reserve umpire: Kumar Dharmasena (SL)
- Match referee: Ranjan Madugalle (SL)

=== New Zealand ===
Put in to bat, New Zealand started off very well, with Daryl Mitchell and Martin Guptill scoring well against the Australian bowlers, helped along by a dropped catch from Matthew Wade. At 28 runs, Mitchell however, fell prey to Josh Hazelwood and was caught behind by Wade. Williamson then joined with Guptill and ensured Australia didn't pick any wickets until the 9th over. After a couple of boundaries to let loose, Williamson started scoring fast to keep up the run rate. In the 12th over, Zampa struck to remove Guptill, who was caught by Stoinis at deep mid-wicket for 28. Williamson then started scoring along with Glenn Phillips, targeting Marsh, Maxwell, and Starc for runs, the latter of which conceded the highest number of runs in a T20 World Cup final, giving away 60 runs in his four-over spell. Hazlewood struck again to remove Phillips and Williamson in the second and fifth ball of the 18th over, respectively. Neesham and Seifert scored at death overs to take New Zealand to a total of 172 for 4. Williamson top-scored for New Zealand with 85, equalling Marlon Samuel's record of 85* against England in 2016, in a T20 World Cup final.

=== Australia ===
Chasing 173 to win, Australia suffered a setback when Aaron Finch was caught in the deep off Boult for 5 (7) during the third ball of the 3rd over. Mitchell Marsh and David Warner joined and started to build a solid partnership against the New Zealand bowling. In the second ball of the 13th over, Boult managed to bowl Warner out for 53 (38). This dismissal meant that Warner missed out on becoming the top scorer for the tournament, his 289 runs coming up behind Pakistan's Babar Azam's 303 runs. With 66 runs needed from 46 balls, Marsh was joined by Maxwell. Maxwell reverse hit Southee for the winning runs, winning their maiden T20 World Cup with 7 balls to spare. By doing so, Australia had scored the highest total in a T20 World Cup final, passing the score of 161 for 6 scored by the West Indies against England in the 2016 edition. Marsh was acknowledged as the player of the match, while Warner won the Player of the Tournament. This is the third time overall that New Zealand had failed to win an ICC limited overs tournament, having failed to do so in the 2015 World Cup (against Australia) and 2019 World Cup (against England).

14 November 2021
18:00 (N)
Scorecard

New Zealand; 172/4 (20 overs)	v	Australia; 173/2 (18.5 overs)
Kane Williamson 85 (48); Josh Hazlewood 3/16 (4 overs)		Mitchell Marsh 77* (50); Trent Boult 2/18 (4 overs)

Australia won by 8 wickets
Dubai International Cricket Stadium, Dubai
Umpires: Marais Erasmus (SA) and Richard Kettleborough (Eng)
Player of the match: Mitchell Marsh (Aus)

- Australia won the toss and elected to field.
- Australia won their maiden T20 World Cup title.

=== Scorecard ===
1st innings

New Zealand batting
Player	Status	Runs	Balls	4s	6s	Strike rate
Martin Guptill	c Stoinis b Zampa	28	35	3	0	80.00
Daryl Mitchell	c Wade b Hazlewood	11	8	0	1	137.50
Kane Williamson	c Smith b Hazlewood	85	48	10	3	177.08
Glenn Phillips	c Maxwell b Hazlewood	18	17	1	1	105.88
James Neesham	not out	13	7	0	1	185.71
Tim Seifert	not out	8	6	1	0	133.33
Mitchell Santner	did not bat					
Tim Southee	did not bat					
Adam Milne	did not bat					
Trent Boult	did not bat					
Ish Sodhi	did not bat					
Extras	(b 1, lb 3, w 4, nb 1)	9				
Total	(4 wickets; 20 overs)	172		15	6	

Fall of wickets: 1/28 (Mitchell, 3.5 ov), 2/76 (Guptill, 11.1 ov), 3/144 (Phillips, 17.2 ov), 4/148 (Williamson, 17.5 ov)

Australia bowling
Bowler	Overs	Maidens	Runs	Wickets	Econ	Wides	NBs
Mitchell Starc	4	0	60	0	15.00	1	1
Josh Hazlewood	4	0	16	3	4.00	0	0
Glenn Maxwell	3	0	28	0	9.33	0	0
Pat Cummins	4	0	27	0	6.75	2	0
Adam Zampa	4	0	26	1	6.50	0	0
Mitchell Marsh	1	0	11	0	11.00	0	0

2nd innings

Australia batting
Player	Status	Runs	Balls	4s	6s	Strike rate
David Warner	b Boult	53	38	4	3	139.47
Aaron Finch	c Mitchell b Boult	5	7	1	0	71.42
Mitchell Marsh	not out	77	50	6	4	154.00
Glenn Maxwell	not out	28	18	4	1	155.55
Steve Smith	did not bat					
Marcus Stoinis	did not bat					
Matthew Wade	did not bat					
Pat Cummins	did not bat					
Mitchell Starc	did not bat					
Adam Zampa	did not bat					
Josh Hazlewood	did not bat					
Extras	(lb 4, w 6)	10				
Total	(2 wickets; 18.5 overs)	173		15	8	

Fall of wickets: 1/15 (Finch, 2.3 ov), 2/107 (Warner, 12.2 ov)

New Zealand bowling
Bowler	Overs	Maidens	Runs	Wickets	Econ	Wides	NBs
Trent Boult	4	0	18	2	4.50	1	0
Tim Southee	3.5	0	43	0	11.21	1	0
Adam Milne	4	0	30	0	7.50	1	0
Ish Sodhi	3	0	40	0	13.33	3	0
Mitchell Santner	3	0	23	0	7.66	0	0
James Neesham	1	0	15	0	15.00	0	0
