= 2009 World Twenty20 final =

2009 ICC World Twenty20 Final
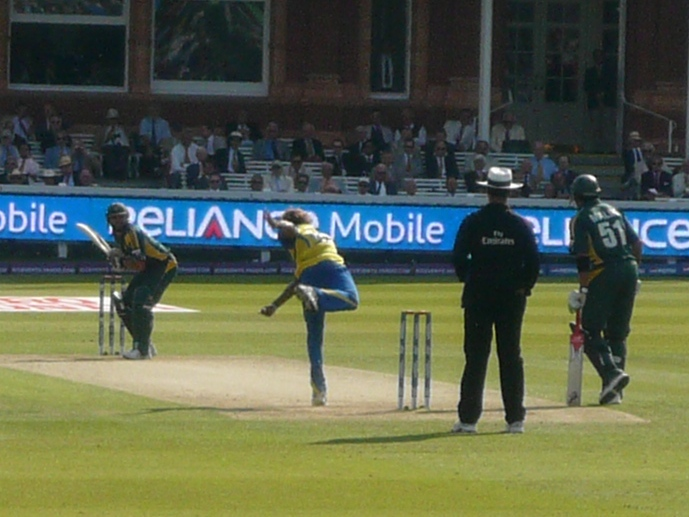
- Lasith Malinga bowling to Shahid Afridi during the Final at the Lord's
- Event: 2009 ICC World Twenty20
Sri Lanka	Pakistan
138/6	139/2
20 overs	18.4 overs
- Pakistan won by 8 wickets
- Date: 21 June 2009
- Venue: Lord's, London
- Player of the match: Shahid Afridi (Pak)
- Umpires: Daryl Harper (Aus) and Simon Taufel (Aus)
- Attendance: 28,000

The 2009 ICC World Twenty20 Final was played between Sri Lanka and Pakistan at the Lord's in London on 21 June 2009. This was the 2nd ICC World Twenty20. Pakistan won the match by eight wickets, its first World Twenty20 victory, after being the runners-up at the very previous tournament in 2007 Pakistan became the 2nd team to win this title after India. This was the second consecutive time where both the finalists were Asian teams. In the stadium, the match was watched by 28,000 spectators and almost 32 million people watched it on TV.

== Background ==
Prior to this match Sri Lanka and Pakistan played 4 times against each other in Twenty20s, where both teams won 2 times each. Their most recent meeting was in that same event where Sri Lanka won by 19 runs. Including that they also met another time in the World Twenty20, which was in the previous event at 2007. Pakistan won by 8 wickets in that match.

== Road to the final ==
=== Sri Lanka ===
Sri Lanka had a very smooth tournament excluding the final match. They were the only unbeaten team at that stage. They won against West Indies in the group stage and eliminated Australia in the group stage by beating them by six wickets. They were the group champions of Group C. In Super8s they were potted in the Group F. They won against Pakistan, Ireland and New Zealand to become the group topper of this group. Dilshan's unbeaten 96 helped Sri Lanka to beat the West Indies team by 57 runs and qualify for their first ICC World Twenty20 Final.

=== Pakistan ===
Despite entering the tournament with a number of the players who had finished second to India during the inaugural World T20, including all-rounders Shahid Afridi and captain Shoaib Malik, fast bowler Umar Gul and batsman Misbah-ul-Haq – supported by teenage but promising left-arm pacer Mohammad Amir – Pakistan's road to the final wasn't smooth like the Lankans. They were in the clinch of elimination at group stage, but a massive 82 runs win against the Netherlands washed out all the tensions for them. Though the loss against host England made them stay behind of the hosts at Group B. Still the tournament system made them the B1 of group B. In the Super 8s, they lost to the Sri Lankan team by 19 runs at their first match. which led them to another tension situation. But another gigantic and dominating win against New Zealand helped them to release the pressure, punctuated by Gul becoming the first bowler to record a five-wicket haul in a T20 international. An easy win against Ireland – redemption for a number of the Pakistani players who had been in the ODI team that had lost to the Irish in Jamaica in the 2007 World Cup that not only knocked them out of the tournament but proved to be Bob Woolmer's final match coaching Pakistan before his death – helped Pakistan to board on the semi-final being the second of Group F next to Sri Lanka.

In the first semifinal at Trent Bridge in front of a crowd including many Pakistanis living in Britain, they faced South Africa, who had come into the tournament as favorites and had lived up to the billing to that point, entering the match unbeaten. Afridi rose to the challenge, earning Man of the Match first with the bat thanks to 51 off 34 as Pakistan reached 149/4 during their 20 overs and then with the ball as he took 2–16 in his four overs after bowling both Herschelle Gibbs and AB De Villiers playing on. Supported by clutch death bowling from Gul and off-spinner Saeed Ajmal, Pakistan held on to secure an upset, winning by 7 runs.

== Team composition ==
Both teams were unchanged from their previous match at the semis.

== Match details ==
=== Match officials ===
- On-field umpires: Daryl Harper (Aus) and Simon Taufel (Aus)
- TV umpire: Steve Davis (Aus)
- Reserve umpire: Billy Bowden (NZ)
- Match referee: Chris Broad (Eng)

=== Toss ===
Sri Lankan captain Kumar Sangakkara won the toss and chose to bat first.

=== Match summary ===
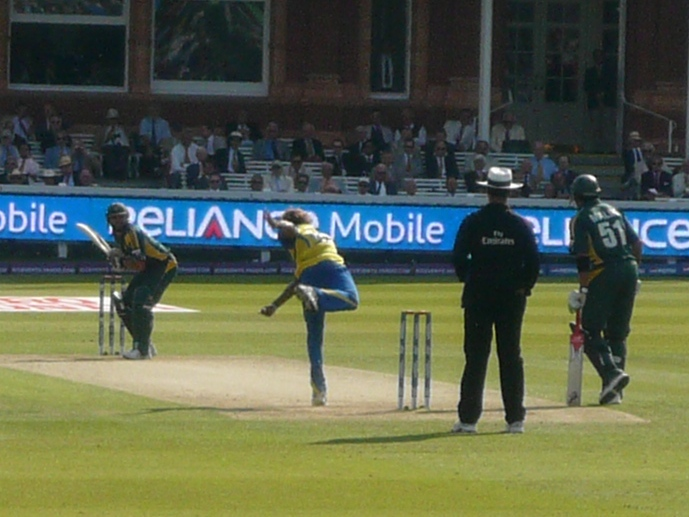
Lasith Malinga bowling from the Nursery End in the Final at Lord's.

The first over was bowled by Mohammad Amir. After failing to score off the first four balls – all short – Dilshan went for his scoop and mistimed it, resulting in him being caught at short fine-leg. Soon after this, Jehan Mubarak top edged a delivery by Abdul Razzaq which went high in the air and was caught by Shahzaib Hasan, leaving Sri Lanka at 2 for 2. Sanath Jayasuriya was able to stabilise the innings for Sri Lanka hitting 17 runs off 10 balls, however, Jayasuriya soon fell as he dragged a good length ball back on to the stumps. Mahela Jayawardene followed after edging a shot into the hands of Misbah-ul-Haq, leaving Sri Lanka on 32/4. Sangakkara and Chamara Silva added further runs, before the latter was caught by Saeed Ajmal playing a pull shot off the bowling of Umar Gul. Shahid Afridi soon after, took the wicket of Isuru Udana with a googly which drifted into the right-hander, knocking the off-stump. This brought in Angelo Mathews, who along with Sangakkara took the score from 70/6 to 138/6, with 17 runs being scored off the last over bowled by Mohammad Amir. Sri Lanka finished on 138/6 from 20 overs.

Pakistan started off well with openers Kamran Akmal and Shahzaib Hasan adding 48 run for the 1st wicket, before Kamran Akmal was stumped by Kumar Sangakkara by the first delivery of Sanath Jayasuriya. Pakistan reached the target in 18.4 overs, with Shahid Afridi, who hit the winning runs, earning Man of the Match while Tillakaratne Dilshan was declared Man of the Series for his 317 runs at an average of 63.40. Pakistan's win, often cheered on by crowds of fans from England's Pakistani communities, marked its first world title since their "cornered tigers", captained by future Prime Minister Imran Khan, had won the 1992 World Cup.

21 June
15:00
Scorecard

Sri Lanka; 138/6 (20 overs)	v	Pakistan; 139/2 (18.4 overs)
Kumar Sangakkara 64* (52); Abdul Razzaq 3/20 (3 overs)		Shahid Afridi 54* (40); Sanath Jayasuriya 1/8 (2 overs)

Pakistan won by 8 wickets
Lord's, London
Umpires: Daryl Harper (Aus) and Simon Taufel (Aus)
Player of the match: Shahid Afridi (Pak)

- Sri Lanka won the toss and elected to bat.

== Scorecard ==
1st innings

Sri Lanka batting
Player	Status	Runs	Balls	4s	6s	Strike rate
Tillakaratne Dilshan	c Hasan b Amir	0	5	0	0	0.00
Sanath Jayasuriya	b Razzaq	17	10	2	1	170.00
Jehan Mubarak	c Hasan b Razzaq	0	2	0	0	0.00
Kumar Sangakkara *†	not out	64	52	7	0	123.07
Mahela Jayawardene	c Misbah b Razzaq	1	4	0	0	25.00
Chamara Silva	c Ajmal b Gul	14	19	2	0	73.68
Isuru Udana	b Afridi	1	5	0	0	20.00
Angelo Mathews	not out	35	24	3	1	145.83
Lasith Malinga	did not bat					
Muttiah Muralitharan	did not bat					
Ajantha Mendis	did not bat					
Extras	(lb 3, nb 1, w 2)	6				
Total	(6 wickets; 20 overs)	138		14	2	

Fall of wickets: 1/0 (Dilshan, 0.5 ov), 2/2 (Mubarak, 1.3 ov), 3/26 (Jayasuriya, 3.5 ov), 4/32 (Jayawardene, 5.3 ov), 5/67 (Silva, 11.3 ov), 6/70 (Udana, 12.6 ov)

Pakistan bowling
Bowler	Overs	Maidens	Runs	Wickets	Econ	Wides	NBs
Mohammad Amir	4	1	30	1	7.50	0	0
Abdul Razzaq	3	0	20	3	6.66	0	0
Shahid Afridi	4	0	20	1	5.00	0	0
Saeed Ajmal	4	0	28	0	7.00	0	0
Shoaib Malik	1	0	8	0	8.00	0	0
Umar Gul	4	0	29	1	7.25	2	1

2nd innings

Pakistan batting
Player	Status	Runs	Balls	4s	6s	Strike rate
Kamran Akmal †	st †Sangakkara b Jayasuriya	37	28	2	2	132.14
Shahzaib Hasan	c Jayasuriya b Muralitharan	19	23	3	0	82.60
Shahid Afridi	not out	54	40	2	2	135.00
Shoaib Malik	not out	24	22	1	0	109.09
Abdul Razzaq						
Younis Khan *						
Misbah-ul-Haq						
Fawad Alam						
Umar Gul						
Saeed Ajmal						
Mohammad Amir						
Extras	(lb 2, nb 1, w 2)	5				
Total	(2 wickets; 18.4 overs)	139		8	4	

Fall of wickets: 1/48 (Akmal, 7.1 ov), 2/63 (Hasan, 9.1 ov)

Sri Lanka bowling
Bowler	Overs	Maidens	Runs	Wickets	Econ	Wides	NBs
Angelo Mathews	2	0	17	0	8.50	0	0
Isuru Udana	4	0	44	0	11.00	2	1
Lasith Malinga	3.4	0	14	0	3.81	0	0
Muttiah Muralitharan	3	0	20	1	6.66	0	0
Ajantha Mendis	4	0	34	0	8.50	0	0
Sanath Jayasuriya	2	0	8	1	4.00	0	0

Key

- * – Captain
- † – Wicket-keeper
- c Fielder – Indicates that the batsman was dismissed by a catch by the named fielder
- b Bowler – Indicates which bowler gains credit for the dismissal
