= 2012 World Twenty20 final =

International men's cricket match

2012 ICC World Twenty20 Final
- Promotional banner for the final
- Event: 2012 ICC World Twenty20
| West Indies | Sri Lanka |
| 137/6 | 101 |
| 20 overs | 18.4 overs |
- West Indies won by 36 runs
- Date: 7 October 2012
- Venue: R. Premadasa Stadium, Colombo
- Player of the match: Marlon Samuels (WI)
- Umpires: Aleem Dar (Pak) and Simon Taufel (Aus)
- Attendance: 38,000

The 2012 ICC World Twenty20 Final was played between Sri Lanka and West Indies at the R. Premadasa Stadium in Colombo on 7 October 2012. This was the 4th ICC World Twenty20. West Indies won the match by 36 runs, its first World Twenty20 victory. This was West Indies's first major trophy since the 2004 ICC Champions Trophy. West Indies became the 4th team to win this title after India, Pakistan and England. This was the first time where a host team (SL) qualified for the final. In the stadium, the match was watched by 38,000 spectators.

== Background ==
Prior to this match Sri Lanka and West Indies played 4 times against each other in Twenty20s, where Sri Lanka won all 4 times. Their most recent meeting was in the same tournament. In that group stage match Sri Lanka won by 9 wickets. Including that they also met each other twice in 2009 ICC World Twenty20, once in group stage and another in semi final. Both match were won by Sri Lanka. they won by 15 runs in the group stage and in the semi-final they eliminated West Indies from the semi-final with a dominating 57 runs win.

== Road to the final ==
=== Sri Lanka ===
Sri Lanka were the favorite from the beginning of the tournament since they were the hosts. They made a flying start against Zimbabwe. They thrashed Zimbabwe and won by 82 runs. But they lost to South Africa by 32 runs (D/L Method) to finish second to South Africa in Group C and qualified for the Super 8 stage. Though the syWorld Twenty20 made them C1 of that group. They had a nice and smooth journey at Super 8 stage. They won comfortably against West Indies and England. But their first match at super 8 against New Zealand was a thriller where the result of the match was decided by super over and Sri Lanka won. They qualified for the semi-final by being the topper of Group 1 with 3 wins in 3 matches. In the semi-final they faced Pakistan. They won by 16 runs to qualify for the final of 2012 ICC World Twenty and their second world twenty20 final.

=== West Indies ===
The Windies arrived as a team that could make a run in the minds of some thanks to such players as famed power hitters and all-rounders Chris Gayle and Kieron Pollard and emerging star off-spinner Sunil Narine, but they did not begin the tournament well and were beaten by Australia in their first match. Their next match was against Ireland and it was washed away by rain. Both of the team received 1 point. But West Indies qualified for the Super 8 from Group B, next to Australia by the virtue of a superior Net run rate. In the super 8 stage they were placed to Group 1 with Sri Lanka, England and New Zealand. They won against England easily and won against New Zealand in super over. But they were thrashed by the hosts Sri Lanka. still with 2 wins in three matches they qualified for the semi-final. A rematch against Australia in the semi-finals, but an unbeaten 75 off 41 from Gayle, including four sixes, helped West Indies post a mammoth total of 205/4. Australia struggled to respond, eventually slumping to 131 all out.

== Team composition ==
Sri Lanka made one change from their winning team of semi final. Akila Dananjaya was in for Rangana Herath, while West Indies team were unchanged.

== Match ==
=== Match officials ===
The on-field umpires were Aleem Dar of Pakistan and Simon Taufel of Australia, with Rod Tucker being the third (TV) umpire. Ian Gould was the fourth umpire. Jeff Crowe was the match referee. This was the last match of Simon Taufel as an international cricket umpire.

- On-field umpires: Aleem Dar (Pak) and Simon Taufel (Aus)
- TV umpire: Rod Tucker (Aus)
- Reserve umpire: Ian Gould (Eng)
- Match referee: Jeff Crowe (NZ)

=== Toss ===
West Indies captain Darren Sammy won the toss and chose to bat first.

=== Summary ===
Batting First, West Indies suffered an early collapse as both their openers Chris Gayle and Johnson Charles, were dismissed for zero and 3 to leave the West Indies at 2–14 after 5.5 overs, resulting 14 runs after the end of batting powerplay that included first wicket maiden over bowled by Angelo Mathews. later then Marlon Samuels and Dwayne Bravo stabilized the innings added 59 runs in 8.5 overs. Marlon Samules played a knock of 78 from 56 balls, involving 3 fours and 6 sixes including the longest six of the tournament at 108 meters. Captain Darren Sammy also led a late charge that produced a small, but valuable knock of 26 runs of just 15 balls. West Indies added 108 runs in the last 10 overs resulting to able to the respectable score of 137 with the loss of 6 wickets and thus able to set Sri Lanka a target of 138.

In reply Sri Lanka also did not get good start their opening batsman Tillakaratne Dilshan was bowled on duck by Ravi Rampaul. Then Kumar Sangakara started to move innings slowly. With the good tight bowling Sri Lankans were restricted to 39/1 after eight overs, With the fall of Wicketkeeper batsman Kumar Sangakara by Samuel Badree on the score of 48 in 10th over Started down Lankans in trouble. Just in span of 21 runs Sri Lankans were reduced to 69/7 in 14.3 overs including the two run outs. Nuwan Kulasekara mustered a brief fightback (26 runs from 16 balls) but holed out to leave the tail end exposed, and Sri Lanka was soon all out on 101 in 18.4 overs resulted in 36 runs short of the target. Captain Mahela Jayawardhane was the top scorer of 33 runs whereas Sunil Narine produced a brilliant figures of 9-3 in 3.4 overs. Samuels was judged as Man of the Match for being his brilliant allround figures contributed with bat of the top-scoring batsman on either side while also taking 1–15 in his entire quota of four overs of bowling.

The win marked the West Indies' first win in an ICC event since the 2004 Champions Trophy and their third ICC world title – though it was also their first since the 1979 World Cup, when a team including Viv Richards, Michael Holding and Clive Lloyd had won the tournament for the second time in a row.

7 October
19:00 (D/N)
Scorecard

| West Indies; 137/6 (20 overs) | v | Sri Lanka; 101 (18.4 overs) |
| Marlon Samuels 78 (55); Ajantha Mendis 4/12 (4 overs) | | Mahela Jayawardene 33 (36); Sunil Narine 3/9 (3.4 overs) |

West Indies won by 36 runs
R. Premadasa Stadium, Colombo, Sri Lanka
Attendance : 35,000
Umpires: Aleem Dar (Pak) and Simon Taufel (Aus)
Player of the match: Marlon Samuels (WI)

- West Indies won the toss and elected to bat
- West Indies won the ICC Twenty20 trophy for the first time.
- This was Sri Lanka's fourth Final in an ICC Event in 5 years and also the second consecutive Final. Previous: 2007 Cricket World Cup, 2009 ICC World Twenty20, 2011 Cricket World Cup
- This is the first Final in an ICC tournament for the West Indies after the 2006 Champions Trophy and also the first after the 1983 World Cup in any type of ICC world championship.
- For the first time, a host nation (SL) competed in the final of the ICC World Twenty20.

=== Scorecard ===
1st innings

West Indies batting
| Player | Status | Runs | Balls | 4s | 6s | Strike rate |
|---|---|---|---|---|---|---|
| Johnson Charles | c Kulasekara b Mathews | 0 | 5 | 0 | 0 | 0.00 |
| Chris Gayle | lbw b A Mendis | 3 | 16 | 0 | 0 | 18.75 |
| Marlon Samuels | c J Mendis b Dananjaya | 78 | 56 | 3 | 6 | 139.28 |
| Dwayne Bravo | lbw b A Mendis | 19 | 19 | 0 | 1 | 100.00 |
| Kieron Pollard | c Dananjaya b A Mendis | 2 | 4 | 0 | 0 | 50.00 |
| Andre Russell | lbw b A Mendis | 0 | 1 | 0 | 0 | 0.00 |
| Daren Sammy * | not out | 26 | 15 | 3 | 0 | 173.33 |
| Denesh Ramdin † | not out | 4 | 4 | 0 | 0 | 100.00 |
| Sunil Narine | did not bat | | | | | |
| Ravi Rampaul | did not bat | | | | | |
| Samuel Badree | did not bat | | | | | |
| Extras | (lb 2, w 3) | 5 | | | | |
| Total | (6 wickets; 20 overs) | 137 | | 6 | 7 | |

Fall of wickets: 1/0 (Charles, 0.5 ov), 2/14 (Gayle, 5.5 ov), 3/73 (Bravo, 13.6 ov), 4/87 (Pollard, 15.2 ov), 5/87 (Russell, 15.3 ov), 6/108 (Samuels, 17.1 ov)

Sri Lanka bowling
| Bowler | Overs | Maidens | Runs | Wickets | Econ | Wides | NBs |
|---|---|---|---|---|---|---|---|
| Angelo Mathews | 4 | 1 | 11 | 1 | 2.75 | 1 | 0 |
| Nuwan Kulasekara | 3 | 0 | 22 | 0 | 7.33 | 1 | 0 |
| Lasith Malinga | 4 | 0 | 54 | 0 | 13.50 | 0 | 0 |
| Ajantha Mendis | 4 | 0 | 12 | 4 | 3.00 | 1 | 0 |
| Akila Dananjaya | 3 | 0 | 16 | 1 | 5.33 | 0 | 0 |
| Jeevan Mendis | 2 | 0 | 20 | 0 | 10.00 | 0 | 0 |

2nd innings

Sri Lanka batting
| Player | Status | Runs | Balls | 4s | 6s | Strike rate |
|---|---|---|---|---|---|---|
| Mahela Jayawardene * | c Sammy b Narine | 33 | 36 | 2 | 0 | 91.66 |
| Tillakaratne Dilshan | b Rampaul | 0 | 3 | 0 | 0 | 0.00 |
| Kumar Sangakkara † | c Pollard b Badree | 22 | 26 | 2 | 0 | 84.61 |
| Angelo Mathews | b Sammy | 1 | 5 | 0 | 0 | 20.00 |
| Jeevan Mendis | run out (Bravo/Narine) | 3 | 3 | 0 | 0 | 100.00 |
| Thisara Perera | run out (†Ramdin) | 3 | 5 | 0 | 0 | 60.00 |
| Lahiru Thirimanne | c Charles b Sammy | 4 | 7 | 0 | 0 | 57.14 |
| Nuwan Kulasekara | c Badree b Narine | 26 | 13 | 3 | 1 | 200.00 |
| Lasith Malinga | c Bravo b Narine | 5 | 13 | 0 | 0 | 38.46 |
| Ajantha Mendis | c Bravo b Samuels | 1 | 2 | 0 | 0 | 50.00 |
| Akila Dananjaya | not out | 0 | 0 | 0 | 0 | 0.00 |
| Extras | (lb 2, nb 1) | 3 | | | | |
| Total | (all out; 18.4 overs) | 101 | | 7 | 1 | |

Fall of wickets: 1/6 (Dilshan, 1.1 ov), 2/48 (Sangakkara, 9.3 ov), 3/51 (Mathews, 10.4 ov), 4/60 (Jayawardene, 12.1 ov), 5/61 (J Mendis, 12.3 ov), 6/64 (Perera, 13.1 ov), 7/69 (Thirimanne, 14.3 ov), 8/96 (Kulasekara, 16.3 ov), 9/100 (A Mendis, 17.5 ov), 10/101 (Malinga, 18.4 ov)

West Indies bowling
| Bowler | Overs | Maidens | Runs | Wickets | Econ | Wides | NBs |
|---|---|---|---|---|---|---|---|
| Samuel Badree | 4 | 0 | 24 | 1 | 6.00 | 0 | 0 |
| Ravi Rampaul | 3 | 0 | 31 | 1 | 10.33 | 0 | 1 |
| Marlon Samuels | 4 | 0 | 15 | 1 | 3.75 | 0 | 0 |
| Chris Gayle | 2 | 0 | 14 | 0 | 7.00 | 0 | 0 |
| Sunil Narine | 3.4 | 0 | 9 | 3 | 2.45 | 0 | 0 |
| Daren Sammy * | 2 | 0 | 6 | 2 | 3.00 | 0 | 0 |

Key

- * – Captain
- † – Wicket-keeper
- c Fielder – Indicates that the batsman was dismissed by a catch by the named fielder
- b Bowler – Indicates which bowler gains credit for the dismissal
