= 2014 World Twenty20 final =

2014 ICC World Twenty20 Final
- Match programme cover
- Event: 2014 ICC World Twenty20
| India | Sri Lanka |
| 130/4 | 134/4 |
| 20 overs | 17.5 overs |
- Sri Lanka won by 6 wickets
- Date: 6 April 2014
- Venue: Sher-e-Bangla National Stadium, Dhaka
- Player of the match: Kumar Sangakkara (SL)
- Umpires: Ian Gould (Eng) and Richard Kettleborough (Eng)
- Attendance: 25,416

The 2014 ICC World Twenty20 final was played between India and Sri Lanka at the Sher-e-Bangla National Stadium in Dhaka on 6 April 2014. This was the 5th ICC World Twenty20. Sri Lanka won the match by six wickets, its first World Twenty20 victory, after being runners-up twice at 2009 and 2012. Sri Lanka became the 5th team to win this title. This was the third time where both the finalists were Asian teams. In the stadium, the match was attended by 25,416 spectators.

== Background ==
Prior to this match India and Sri Lanka played 5 times against each other in Twenty20s, where Sri Lanka won 3 times and India won 2 times. In 2010 ICC World Twenty20 these teams met each other where Sri Lanka beat India by 5 wickets in a last ball thriller. This was their only meeting in an ICC World Twenty20 until this match.

== Road to the final ==
=== India ===
India directly qualified for the super 10s. They started their tournament strongly. They won their first match against Pakistan very easily. They beat West Indies, Bangladesh and Australia easily to be the topper of Group 1 with a 100% win rate. In the semi-final they faced South Africa. A 72 not out innings from Virat Kohli helped India to qualify for the final.

=== Sri Lanka ===
Sri Lanka was one of the favorite of this tournament. They were the champions of Group 2 with wins against Netherlands, South Africa and New Zealand. But they lost to England. Their win against Netherlands was the biggest victory in terms of balls remaining in all T20I. Also they bowled out Netherlands for only 39 runs which is the lowest score in all T20I. In the semi-final, Sri Lanka defeated the defending champions West Indies by 27 runs (D/L method) in a rain interrupted match.

== Match ==
=== Match officials ===
- On-field umpires: Ian Gould (Eng) and Richard Kettleborough (Eng)
- TV umpire: Rod Tucker (Aus)
- Reserve umpire: Bruce Oxenford (Aus)
- Match referee: David Boon (Aus)

=== Teams and toss ===
Sri Lankan captain Lasith Malinga won the toss and decided to field first in the rain delayed final. India remained unchanged from the side that played the semi-final, while Sri Lanka brought Thisara Perera in place of Seekkuge Prasanna.

=== Match summary ===
6 April
19:00 (D/N)
Scorecard

| India; 130/4 (20 overs) | v | Sri Lanka; 134/4 (17.5 overs) |
| Virat Kohli 77 (58); Rangana Herath 1/23 (4 overs) | | Kumar Sangakkara 52* (35); Mohit Sharma 1/18 (2 overs) |

Sri Lanka won by 6 wickets
Sher-e-Bangla National Stadium, Mirpur
Umpires: Ian Gould (Eng) and Richard Kettleborough (Eng)
Player of the match: Kumar Sangakkara (SL)

- Sri Lanka won the toss and chose to field.
- Kumar Sangakkara and Mahela Jayawardene (SL) played in their last T20I.
- Mahela Jayawardene (SL) became the first batsman to reach 1000 runs in ICC World Twenty20.

=== Scorecard ===
1st innings

India batting
| Player | Status | Runs | Balls | 4s | 6s | Strike rate |
|---|---|---|---|---|---|---|
| Rohit Sharma | c Senanayake b Herath | 29 | 26 | 3 | 0 | 111.53 |
| Ajinkya Rahane | b Mathews | 3 | 8 | 0 | 0 | 37.50 |
| Virat Kohli | run out (Senanayake) | 77 | 58 | 5 | 4 | 132.75 |
| Yuvraj Singh | c T Perera b Kulasekara | 11 | 21 | 0 | 0 | 52.38 |
| MS Dhoni *† | not out | 4 | 7 | 0 | 0 | 57.14 |
| Suresh Raina | did not bat | | | | | |
| Ravichandran Ashwin | did not bat | | | | | |
| Ravindra Jadeja | did not bat | | | | | |
| Amit Mishra | did not bat | | | | | |
| Bhuvneshwar Kumar | did not bat | | | | | |
| Mohit Sharma | did not bat | | | | | |
| Extras | (b 2, lb 2, w 2) | 6 | | | | |
| Total | (4 wickets; 20 overs) | 130 | | 8 | 4 | |

Fall of wickets: 1/4 (Rahane, 1.3 ov), 2/64 (Rohit, 10.3 ov), 3/119 (Yuvraj, 18.1 ov), 4/130 (Kohli, 19.6 ov)

Sri Lanka bowling
| Bowler | Overs | Maidens | Runs | Wickets | Econ | Wides | NBs |
|---|---|---|---|---|---|---|---|
| Nuwan Kulasekara | 4 | 0 | 29 | 1 | 7.25 | 0 | 0 |
| Angelo Mathews | 4 | 0 | 25 | 1 | 6.25 | 0 | 0 |
| Sachithra Senanayake | 4 | 0 | 22 | 0 | 5.50 | 0 | 0 |
| Lasith Malinga * | 4 | 0 | 27 | 0 | 6.75 | 1 | 0 |
| Rangana Herath | 4 | 0 | 23 | 1 | 5.75 | 1 | 0 |

2nd innings

Sri Lanka batting
| Player | Status | Runs | Balls | 4s | 6s | Strike rate |
|---|---|---|---|---|---|---|
| Kusal Perera | c Jadeja b Mohit | 5 | 7 | 1 | 0 | 71.42 |
| Tillakaratne Dilshan | c Kohli b Ashwin | 18 | 16 | 4 | 0 | 112.50 |
| Mahela Jayawardene | c Ashwin b Raina | 24 | 24 | 4 | 0 | 100.00 |
| Kumar Sangakkara † | not out | 52 | 35 | 6 | 1 | 148.57 |
| Lahiru Thirimanne | c †Dhoni b Mishra | 7 | 11 | 1 | 0 | 63.63 |
| Thisara Perera | not out | 23 | 14 | 0 | 3 | 164.28 |
| Angelo Mathews | | | | | | |
| Nuwan Kulasekara | | | | | | |
| Sachithra Senanayake | | | | | | |
| Rangana Herath | | | | | | |
| Lasith Malinga * | | | | | | |
| Extras | (lb 2, w 3) | 5 | | | | |
| Total | (4 wickets; 17.5 overs) | 134 | | 16 | 4 | |

Fall of wickets: 1/5 (K Perera, 1.1 ov), 2/41 (Dilshan, 5.5 ov), 3/65 (Jayawardene, 9.5 ov), 4/78 (Thirimanne, 12.3 ov)

India bowling
| Bowler | Overs | Maidens | Runs | Wickets | Econ | Wides | NBs |
|---|---|---|---|---|---|---|---|
| Bhuvneshwar Kumar | 3 | 0 | 18 | 0 | 6.00 | 0 | 0 |
| Mohit Sharma | 2 | 0 | 18 | 1 | 9.00 | 0 | 0 |
| Ravichandran Ashwin | 3.5 | 0 | 29 | 1 | 7.56 | 1 | 0 |
| Amit Mishra | 4 | 0 | 32 | 1 | 8.00 | 1 | 0 |
| Suresh Raina | 4 | 0 | 24 | 1 | 6.00 | 1 | 0 |
| Ravindra Jadeja | 1 | 0 | 11 | 0 | 11.00 | 0 | 0 |

Key

- * – Captain
- † – Wicket-keeper
- c Fielder – Indicates that the batsman was dismissed by a catch by the named fielder
- b Bowler – Indicates which bowler gains credit for the dismissal

== Aftermath ==
Newspapers called the triumph as a "fitting farewell" to a golden generation, including Mahela Jayawardene and Kumar Sangakkara who announced their retirement from T20 cricket after the victory. This was Sri Lanka's maiden World Twenty20 title and their second major ICC title victory after 1996. Sri Lanka received $1.1 million while India received $550,000 as prize money from ICC.

In Colombo, thousands of fans gave a heroic welcome to Sri Lankan players. An open-top parade from Katunayake Airport to Colombo was held upon the arrival of players. On the other hand in India, it was a moment of agony as many fans took to social media and vented their frustration at Yuvraj Singh, who managed to score only 11 runs off 21 balls, slowing the run rate and making it hard to put on a good total. According to various reports, stones were pelted at his house in Chandigarh after the defeat. Yuvraj's father Yograj Singh told that his son should not be singled out for the defeat. Indian captain MS Dhoni also defended him, saying that he tried his best.
