= 2024 Men's T20 World Cup =

International cricket tournament

2024 ICC Men's T20 World Cup
- Dates: 1 – 29 June 2024
- Administrator: International Cricket Council
- Cricket format: Twenty20 International
- Tournament format(s): Group stage, Super 8 stage and knockout stage
- Hosts: West Indies; United States
- Champions: India (2nd title)
- Runners-up: South Africa
- Participants: 20
- Matches: 55
- Player of the series: (India) Jasprit Bumrah
- Most runs: (Afghanistan) Rahmanullah Gurbaz (281)
- Most wickets: (Afghanistan) Fazalhaq Farooqi (17) (India) Arshdeep Singh (17)
- Official website: icc-cricket.com

The 2024 ICC Men's T20 World Cup was the ninth edition of the ICC Men's T20 World Cup, co-hosted by Cricket West Indies and USA Cricket from 1 to 29 June 2024. It was the first major ICC tournament to include matches played in the United States. The West Indies had previously hosted the 2010 competition. A total of twenty teams competed in 55 matches across six venues in the West Indies, and three in the United States with a total attendance of 190,000 in those three venues.

The number of participants was increased from sixteen to twenty teams, which included teams from the two hosts, the top eight teams from the 2022 edition, the two highest-ranked teams in the ICC Men's T20I Team Rankings not already qualified, and eight other teams determined through a series of regional qualifiers. Canada and Uganda qualified for the men's T20 World Cup for the first time; and the United States participated for the first time by virtue of being co-hosts.

England were the defending champions and were beaten in the semi-finals by India, who went on to win their second T20 World Cup title, defeating South Africa by seven runs in the final. India won all their matches, and were the first team to win a T20 World Cup while undefeated. They joined England and West Indies as the only teams to win the title twice.

== Background ==
The ICC Men's T20 World Cup is a biennial world cup for cricket in Twenty20 International (T20I) format, organised by the International Cricket Council (ICC). It was first played in 2007 in South Africa, and the 2024 tournament marked its ninth edition. The eighth edition, held in 2022 in Australia, was contested by 16 teams, and was won by England who defeated Pakistan in the final.

=== Host selection ===
In November 2021, as part of the 2024–2031 ICC men's hosts cycle, the ICC announced that the 2024 Men's T20 World Cup would be played in the West Indies and the United States. A joint bid had been submitted by Cricket West Indies and USA Cricket following two years of preparation, and as part of a strategic partnership between the two associations.

USA Cricket's co-hosting was part of efforts to help develop and promote cricket in the United States, where the sport's fanbase largely consists of South Asian diaspora. Prior to this World Cup, the United States had occasionally hosted West Indies home matches at Central Broward Park in Florida, while a T20 franchise league known as Major League Cricket launched in 2023.

The United States is associated with several notable developments in the early history of the game, including hosting Canada in the first international cricket match, and American cricketer Bart King being credited with the development of swing bowling.

=== Format ===
The 20 qualifying teams were divided into four groups of five each. In the group stage, each team played four matches against one another in a round-robin; the top two teams in each group advanced to the Super 8 stage, where they were placed into two groups of four teams each, and played three matches against one another. The top two teams in each group advanced to the knockout stage.

Prior to the tournament, the ICC announced the eight seeded teams for the Super 8 stage based on their T20I rankings ahead of the tournament. After advancing from the group stage, the teams were placed in predetermined positions in the Super 8 stage, irrespective of their position in the group stage. If an unseeded team qualified at the expense of a seeded team, it took the position of the corresponding seeded team that failed to qualify from their group.

=== Schedule ===
June 2024 was allocated to the tournament on the 2023–2027 ICC Men's Future Tours Programme. On 28 July 2023, ESPNcricinfo reported that the tournament would be played from 4 to 30 June 2024. The finalized schedule was announced on 5 January 2024, with the tournament scheduled to take place from 1 to 29 June. The teams played 55 matches with three cities in the United States hosting 12 matches and the rest of the matches hosted at six venues in the Caribbean. On 16 May 2024, the ICC announced that warm-up fixtures would be held from 27 May to 1 June.

=== Prize money ===
The ICC allocated a pool of $11.25 million in prize money for the tournament. The winners would be given at least $2.45 million, the highest prize money in the history of the tournament. Moreover, each team would receive an additional $31,154 for each match they won, excluding the semi-finals and final.

Prize money allocation for the tournament
Place	Teams	Amount	
Place	Teams	per side	Total
Champions	1	$2.45 million	$2.45 million
Runners-up	1	$1.28 million	$1.28 million
Semi-finalists	2	$787,500	$1.575 million
5th–8th place (Super 8)	4	$382,500	$1.53 million
9th–12th place (Group stage)	4	$247,500	$0.99 million
13th–20th place (Group stage)	8	$225,000	$1.8 million
Match winners	52	$31,154	$1.62 million
Total	20	$11.25 million	

=== Marketing ===
The ICC hosted a trophy tour, before the tournament, which began on 19 March in New York, and the trophy was taken to various locations around the world. Former cricketers Yuvraj Singh, Chris Gayle and Shahid Afridi, as well as Olympic athlete Usain Bolt, were named as the ambassadors of the tournament. The official theme song for the tournament, "Out of This World", produced by Tano and performed by Sean Paul and Kes, was released on 2 May 2024 under the Ineffable Records label. The song has three remix versions.

== Qualification ==
The hosts, the West Indies and the United States, along with the top eight teams from the 2022 tournament, automatically qualified for the tournament. The remaining two automatic qualification places were taken by the best-ranked teams in the ICC Men's T20I Team Rankings, which had not already qualified as of 14 November 2022. The eight remaining places were filled via the ICC's regional qualifiers, consisting of two teams from Africa, Asia, and Europe and one team each from the Americas and the East Asia-Pacific groups. In May 2022, the ICC confirmed the sub-regional qualification pathways for Europe, East Asia-Pacific, and Africa.

In July 2023, Ireland and Scotland qualified from the Europe Qualifier, followed by Papua New Guinea from the East Asia-Pacific Qualifier. Canada secured its qualification in October 2023 after winning the Americas Qualifier. The following month, Nepal and Oman qualified by reaching the final of the Asia Qualifier in Nepal. Namibia and Uganda became the final two teams to qualify after being assured of a top-two finish in the Africa Qualifier, with Zimbabwe becoming the only Test-playing country that failed to qualify for the World Cup. Canada and Uganda qualified for the men's T20 World Cup for the first time, while the United States also participated for the first time by virtue of being co-host.

Countries that participated in the 2024 T20 World Cup qualification pathway.

Teams qualified for the tournament
Method of qualification	No. of teams	Teams	T20I ranking (Note: The ICC Men's T20I Team Rankings of the respective team ahead of the tournament.)
Hosts	2	West Indies	4
Hosts	2	United States	18
2022 Men's T20 World Cup (Top 8 teams from the previous tournament)	8	Australia	2
2022 Men's T20 World Cup (Top 8 teams from the previous tournament)	8	England	3
2022 Men's T20 World Cup (Top 8 teams from the previous tournament)	8	India	1
2022 Men's T20 World Cup (Top 8 teams from the previous tournament)	8	Netherlands	15
2022 Men's T20 World Cup (Top 8 teams from the previous tournament)	8	New Zealand	5
2022 Men's T20 World Cup (Top 8 teams from the previous tournament)	8	Pakistan	6
2022 Men's T20 World Cup (Top 8 teams from the previous tournament)	8	South Africa	7
2022 Men's T20 World Cup (Top 8 teams from the previous tournament)	8	Sri Lanka	8
ICC Men's T20I Team Rankings	2	Afghanistan	10
ICC Men's T20I Team Rankings	2	Bangladesh	9
Europe Qualifier	2	Ireland	11
Europe Qualifier	2	Scotland	14
East Asia-Pacific Qualifier	1	Papua New Guinea	20
Americas Qualifier	1	Canada	23
Asia Qualifier	2	Nepal	17
Asia Qualifier	2	Oman	19
Africa Qualifier	2	Namibia	13
Africa Qualifier	2	Uganda	22
Total	20		

== Venues ==
In May 2023, Cricket West Indies (CWI) began a bidding process for countries in the Caribbean region willing to host the matches of the World Cup. In July 2023, the ICC shortlisted four venues to host World Cup matches in the United States: Central Broward Park in Lauderhill, Florida; Church Street Park in Morrisville, North Carolina; Grand Prairie Stadium in Grand Prairie, Texas; and a temporary stadium at Van Cortlandt Park in the Bronx, New York City. Residents of the Bronx objected to the Van Cortlandt Park stadium, citing that it would restrict public access to the park for an extended time, expressing concerns for its environmental impact, and questioning the economic viability of the event. On 20 September 2023, the ICC announced that Grand Prairie, Lauderhill, and New York would be the three U.S. host cities, with a 34,000-seat temporary stadium to be constructed at Eisenhower Park on Long Island in Nassau County, New York. Central Broward Park and Grand Prairie Stadium were to be expanded, with temporary grandstands and hospitality areas doubling their capacity during the tournament.

On 22 September 2023, the ICC announced that Antigua and Barbuda, Barbados, Guyana, Saint Lucia, Saint Vincent and the Grenadines, and Trinidad and Tobago would be the locations of venues in the West Indies.Grenada, Jamaica, and Saint Kitts and Nevis did not submit bids to host the World Cup, with Jamaican sports minister Olivia Grange ruling out a bid on cost grounds. In November 2023, it was announced that Trinidad's Queen's Park Oval, the country's primary cricket venue, would not be hosting any World Cup matches and that fixtures would be moved to the Brian Lara Cricket Academy in San Fernando. Nigel Camacho, the president of the Queen's Park Cricket Club, stated that the venue would instead most likely host warm-up matches before the start of the main tournament. The Government of Dominica decided to withdraw its venue, Windsor Park, citing its inability to complete the infrastructural development of the venue before the tournament commenced.

In December 2023, a delegation of representatives from the ICC undertook an inspection of the confirmed host venues in the Caribbean and the United States, intending to finalise the fixtures for the tournament. The New York stadium was slated to host the India–Pakistan group stage match, which was considered one of the sport's strongest rivalries. On 17 January 2024, the ICC unveiled the proposed design of the temporary New York stadium—Nassau County International Cricket Stadium—which was completed in May 2024, in time for the tournament. It marked the first temporary venue to have ever been used during an ICC World Cup.

Venues in the West Indies
A map of the Caribbean region with pin-points on 2024 Men's T20 World Cup venues
Antigua & Barbuda	Barbados	Guyana
Sir Vivian Richards Stadium	Kensington Oval	Providence Stadium
Capacity: 10,000	Capacity: 28,000	Capacity: 20,000
Matches: 8	Matches: 9 (Final)	Matches: 6 (Semi-final 2)
Sir Vivian Richards Stadium in 2015	Kensington Oval in 2007	Providence Stadium in 2011
Saint Lucia	St. Vincent & the Grenadines	Trinidad & Tobago
Daren Sammy Cricket Ground	Arnos Vale Stadium	Brian Lara Cricket Academy
Capacity: 15,000	Capacity: 18,000	Capacity: 15,000
Matches: 6	Matches: 5	Matches: 5 (Semi-final 1)
Daren Sammy Cricket Ground in 2011	Arnos Vale Stadium in 2023	Brian Lara Cricket Academy in 2010

Venues in the United States
A map of the United States with pin-points on 2024 Men's T20 World Cup venues
Florida	New York	Texas
Central Broward Park	Nassau County Stadium	Grand Prairie Stadium
Capacity: 25,000 (Note: The capacity of this stadium was expanded using temporary seating during the competition.)	Capacity: 34,000	Capacity: 15,000
Matches: 4	Matches: 8	Matches: 4
Central Broward Park in 2008	Nassau County Stadium in 2024	Grand Prairie Stadium in 2024

== Squads ==
Each team was allowed to have a squad of 15 players and was required submit the provisional squad to the ICC by 1 May 2024. The teams were allowed to make changes to their squads until 25 May.

== Match officials ==
On 3 May 2024, the ICC released the list of match referees and umpires for the tournament.

Match referees

- (Australia) David Boon
- (New Zealand) Jeff Crowe
- (Sri Lanka) Ranjan Madugalle
- (Zimbabwe) Andy Pycroft
- (Cricket West Indies) Richie Richardson
- (India) Javagal Srinath

Umpires

- (New Zealand) Chris Brown
- (Sri Lanka) Kumar Dharmasena
- (New Zealand) Chris Gaffaney
- (England) Michael Gough
- (South Africa) Adrian Holdstock
- (England) Richard Illingworth
- (England) Richard Kettleborough
- (India) Jayaraman Madanagopal
- (India) Nitin Menon
- (Australia) Sam Nogajski
- (South Africa) Allahudien Paleker
- (Pakistan) Ahsan Raza
- (Pakistan) Rashid Riaz
- (Australia) Paul Reiffel
- (Zimbabwe) Langton Rusere
- (Bangladesh) Sharfuddoula
- (Australia) Rod Tucker
- (England) Alex Wharf
- (Cricket West Indies) Joel Wilson
- (Pakistan) Asif Yaqoob

== Warm-up matches ==
The warm-up matches were played from 27 May to 1 June, and involved most of the teams, except England, New Zealand, Pakistan, and South Africa.

Warm-up match 1
27 May 2024
10:30 UTC−5
Scorecard

Canada; 183/7 (20 overs)	v	Nepal; 120 (19.3 overs)
Nicholas Kirton 52 (39); Abinash Bohara 2/27 (3 overs)		Kushal Malla 37 (30); Dillon Heyliger 4/20 (2.3 overs)

Canada won by 63 runs
Grand Prairie Stadium, Dallas
Umpires: Jermaine Lindo (USA) and Rushane Samuels (WI)

- Nepal won the toss and elected to field.

Warm-up match 2
27 May 2024
15:00 UTC−4
Scorecard

Papua New Guinea; 137/9 (20 overs)	v	Oman; 141/7 (19.1 overs)
Lega Siaka 28 (24); Aqib Ilyas 3/22 (4 overs)		Zeeshan Maqsood 45 (42); Alei Nao 2/12 (3 overs)

Oman won by 3 wickets
Brian Lara Cricket Academy, San Fernando
Umpires: Christopher Taylor (WI) and Carl Tuckett (WI)

- Oman won the toss and elected to field.

Warm-up match 3
27 May 2024
19:00 UTC−4 (N)
Scorecard

Uganda; 134/8 (20 overs)	v	Namibia; 135/5 (18.5 overs)
Roger Mukasa 53* (41); Jack Brassell 2/16 (4 overs)		Niko Davin 54 (34); Henry Ssenyondo 2/14 (3 overs)

Namibia won by 5 wickets
Brian Lara Cricket Academy, San Fernando
Umpires: Zahid Bassarath (WI) and Deighton Butler (WI)

- Namibia won the toss and elected to field.

Warm-up match 4
28 May 2024
10:30 UTC−4
Scorecard

Netherlands; 181/5 (20 overs)	v	Sri Lanka; 161 (18.5 overs)
Michael Levitt 55 (28); Dilshan Madushanka 2/39 (4 overs)		Wanindu Hasaranga 43 (15); Aryan Dutt 3/20 (2 overs)

Netherlands won by 20 runs
Central Broward Park, Lauderhill
Umpires: Aditya Gajjar (USA) and Tarakeswara Rao (Ind)

- Sri Lanka won the toss and elected to field.

Warm-up match 5
28 May 2024
10:30 UTC−5
Scorecard

Bangladesh	v	United States

Match abandoned
Grand Prairie Stadium, Dallas
Umpires: Owen Brown (USA) and Jermaine Lindo (USA)

- No toss.
- Match abandoned due to bad weather.

Warm-up match 6
28 May 2024
19:00 UTC−4 (N)
Scorecard

Namibia; 119/9 (20 overs)	v	Australia; 123/3 (10 overs)
Zane Green 38 (30); Adam Zampa 3/25 (4 overs)		David Warner 54* (21); Bernard Scholtz 2/16 (2 overs)

Australia won by 7 wickets
Queen's Park Oval, Port of Spain
Umpires: Christopher Taylor (WI) and Carl Tuckett (WI)

- Australia won the toss and elected to field.

Warm-up match 7
29 May 2024
13:00 UTC−4
Scorecard

Oman; 154/3 (20 overs)	v	Afghanistan
Aqib Ilyas 66* (48); Azmatullah Omarzai 1/23 (2 overs)

No result
Queen's Park Oval, Port of Spain
Umpires: Zahid Bassarath (WI) and Deighton Butler (WI)

- Afghanistan won the toss and elected to field.
- Rain prevented any further play.

Warm-up match 8
30 May 2024
10:30 UTC−5
Scorecard

United States	v	Nepal

No result
Grand Prairie Stadium, Dallas
Umpires: Owen Brown (USA) and Rushane Samuels (WI)

- United States won the toss and elected to bat.
- No play was possible due to rain.

Warm-up match 9
30 May 2024
10:30 UTC−4
Scorecard

Uganda; 90/5 (18 overs)	v	Scotland; 27/0 (1.5 overs)
Riazat Ali Shah 22 (34); Safyaan Sharif 2/16 (3 overs)		Oli Hairs 20* (7)

No result
Brian Lara Cricket Academy, San Fernando
Umpires: Christopher Taylor (WI) and Carl Tuckett (WI)

- Scotland won the toss and elected to field.
- The match was reduced to 18 overs per side due to rain.
- Rain prevented any further play.

Warm-up match 10
30 May 2024
15:00 UTC−5
Scorecard

Netherlands	v	Canada

Match abandoned
Grand Prairie Stadium, Dallas
Umpires: Jermaine Lindo (USA) and Rushane Samuels (WI)

- No toss.
- No play was possible due to rain.

Warm-up match 11
30 May 2024
15:00 UTC−4
Scorecard

Papua New Guinea; 109/7 (20 overs)	v	Namibia; 93/6 (16.5 overs)
Sese Bau 29 (25); David Wiese 2/8 (3 overs)		Jan Frylinck 36 (39); Alei Nao 2/9 (2 overs)

Namibia won by 3 runs (DLS method)
Brian Lara Cricket Academy, San Fernando
Umpires: Christopher Taylor (WI) and Carl Tuckett (WI)

- Namibia won the toss and elected to field.
- Namibia were set a revised target of 91.

Warm-up match 12
30 May 2024
19:00 UTC−4 (N)
Scorecard

West Indies; 257/4 (20 overs)	v	Australia; 222/7 (20 overs)
Nicholas Pooran 75 (25); Adam Zampa 2/62 (4 overs)		Josh Inglis 55 (30); Gudakesh Motie 2/31 (4 overs)

West Indies won by 35 runs
Queen's Park Oval, Port of Spain
Umpires: Zahid Bassarath (WI) and Deighton Butler (WI)

- Australia won the toss and elected to field.

Warm-up match 13
31 May 2024
10:30 UTC−4
Scorecard

Sri Lanka; 163/8 (20 overs)	v	Ireland; 122 (18.2 overs)
Angelo Mathews 32* (30); Barry McCarthy 2/31 (2.4 overs)		Curtis Campher 26 (26); Dasun Shanaka 4/23 (3.2 overs)

Sri Lanka won by 41 runs
Central Broward Park, Lauderhill
Umpires: Aditya Gajjar (USA) and Vijaya Mallela (USA)

- Ireland won the toss and elected to field.

Warm-up match 14
31 May 2024
10:30 UTC−4
Scorecard

Afghanistan; 178/8 (20 overs)	v	Scotland; 123/9 (20 overs)
Gulbadin Naib 69 (30); Chris Sole 3/35 (4 overs)		Mark Watt 34 (25); Karim Janat 2/13 (2 overs)

Afghanistan won by 55 runs
Queen's Park Oval, Port of Spain
Umpires: Zahid Bassarath (WI) and Deighton Butler (WI)

- Afghanistan won the toss and elected to bat.

Warm-up match 15
1 June 2024
10:30 UTC−4
Scorecard

India; 182/5 (20 overs)	v	Bangladesh; 122/9 (20 overs)
Rishabh Pant 53 (32); Mahmudullah 1/16 (2 overs)		Mahmudullah 40 (28); Arshdeep Singh 2/12 (3 overs)

India won by 60 runs
Nassau County International Cricket Stadium, East Meadow
Umpires: Chris Brown (NZ) and Richard Kettleborough (Eng)

- India won the toss and elected to bat.

== Group stage ==
The ICC announced the groups and their fixtures on 5 January 2024, with the group stage matches being played from 1 to 17 June. The 20 teams were divided into four groups of five with each team facing the other teams in the group for a total of 40 matches. The opening match was played with co-hosts United States facing Canada in the first ever T20I match at Grand Prairie Stadium on 1 June. The Nassau County Stadium at New York hosted its first-ever international match on 3 June between South Africa and Sri Lanka. The following table lists teams in order of their initial group stage seedings.

Group A	Group B	Group C	Group D
India; Pakistan; Ireland; Canada; United States	England; Australia; Namibia; Scotland; Oman	New Zealand; West Indies; Afghanistan; Uganda; Papua New Guinea	South Africa; Sri Lanka; Bangladesh; Netherlands; Nepal

=== Group A ===
Pos	Team	Pld	W	L	NR	Pts	NRR	Qualification
1	India	4	3	0	1	7	1.137	Advanced to the Super 8 stage
2	United States (H)	4	2	1	1	5	0.127	Advanced to the Super 8 stage
3	Pakistan	4	2	2	0	4	0.294	Eliminated
4	Canada	4	1	2	1	3	−0.493	Eliminated
5	Ireland	4	0	3	1	1	−1.293	Eliminated

Source: ESPNcricinfo
Rules for classification: 1) Points; 2) Wins; 3) Net run rate; 4) Results of games between tied teams; 5) Initial group stage seedings
(H) Hosts

Match 1
1 June 2024
19:30 UTC−5 (N)
Scorecard

Canada; 194/5 (20 overs)	v	United States; 197/3 (17.4 overs)
Navneet Dhaliwal 61 (44); Harmeet Singh 1/27 (4 overs)		Aaron Jones 94* (40); Dillon Heyliger 1/19 (3 overs)

United States won by 7 wickets
Grand Prairie Stadium, Dallas
Umpires: Richard Illingworth (Eng) and Sharfuddoula (Ban)
Player of the match: Aaron Jones (USA)

- United States won the toss and elected to field.
- This was the first T20I match played at this venue.
- Both United States and Canada made their T20 World Cup debuts.
- This was the first World Cup match victory for the United States across all formats.

Match 8
5 June 2024
10:30 UTC−4
Scorecard

Ireland; 96 (16 overs)	v	India; 97/2 (12.2 overs)
Gareth Delany 26 (14); Hardik Pandya 3/27 (4 overs)		Rohit Sharma 52* (37); Ben White 1/6 (1 over)

India won by 8 wickets
Nassau County International Cricket Stadium, East Meadow
Umpires: Chris Gaffaney (NZ) and Alex Wharf (Eng)
Player of the match: Jasprit Bumrah (Ind)

- India won the toss and elected to field.
- Rohit Sharma (Ind) scored his 4,000th run in T20Is and 1,000th run in the T20 World Cup, becoming the second Indian to achieve both feats after Virat Kohli. He also completed 600 sixes in international cricket, 100 sixes in ICC tournaments and 300 wins in international cricket.
- Rishabh Pant (Ind) scored his 1,000th run in T20Is.
- Rohit Sharma broke MS Dhoni's record of most wins as Indian Captain in T20Is.

Match 11
6 June 2024
10:30 UTC−5
Scorecard

Pakistan; 159/7 (20 overs)	v	United States; 159/3 (20 overs)
Babar Azam 44 (43); Nosthush Kenjige 3/30 (4 overs)		Monank Patel 50 (38); Mohammad Amir 1/25 (4 overs)

Match tied (United States won the Super Over)
Grand Prairie Stadium, Dallas
Umpires: Michael Gough (Eng) and Allahudien Paleker (SA)
Player of the match: Monank Patel (USA)

- United States won the toss and elected to field.
- This was the first time Pakistan and United States faced each other in T20Is.
- Babar Azam (Pak) became the highest run-scorer in T20Is, surpassing Virat Kohli.
- This was United States's first win against Pakistan in T20Is.
- Super Over: United States 18/1, Pakistan 13/1

Match 13
7 June 2024
10:30 UTC−4
Scorecard

Canada; 137/7 (20 overs)	v	Ireland; 125/7 (20 overs)
Nicholas Kirton 49 (35); Barry McCarthy 2/24 (4 overs)		Mark Adair 34 (24); Jeremy Gordon 2/16 (4 overs)

Canada won by 12 runs
Nassau County International Cricket Stadium, East Meadow
Umpires: Richard Kettleborough (Eng) and Sam Nogajski (Aus)
Player of the match: Nicholas Kirton (Can)

- Ireland won the toss and elected to field.
- This was the first T20 World Cup match victory for Canada.

Match 19
9 June 2024
10:30 UTC−4
Scorecard

India; 119 (19 overs)	v	Pakistan; 113/7 (20 overs)
Rishabh Pant 42 (31); Naseem Shah 3/21 (4 overs)		Mohammad Rizwan 31 (44); Jasprit Bumrah 3/14 (4 overs)

India won by 6 runs
Nassau County International Cricket Stadium, East Meadow
Umpires: Richard Illingworth (Eng) and Rod Tucker (Aus)
Player of the match: Jasprit Bumrah (Ind)

- Pakistan won the toss and elected to field.
- Mohammad Rizwan (Pak) played in his 100th T20I match.

Match 22
11 June 2024
10:30 UTC−4
Scorecard

Canada; 106/7 (20 overs)	v	Pakistan; 107/3 (17.3 overs)
Aaron Johnson 52 (44); Mohammad Amir 2/13 (4 overs)		Mohammad Rizwan 53* (53); Dillon Heyliger 2/18 (4 overs)

Pakistan won by 7 wickets
Nassau County International Cricket Stadium, East Meadow
Umpires: Kumar Dharmasena (SL) and Adrian Holdstock (SA)
Player of the match: Mohammad Amir (Pak)

- Pakistan won the toss and elected to field.
- Haris Rauf (Pak) took his 100th wicket in T20Is.

Match 25
12 June 2024
10:30 UTC−4
Scorecard

United States; 110/8 (20 overs)	v	India; 111/3 (18.2 overs)
Nitish Kumar 27 (23); Arshdeep Singh 4/9 (4 overs)		Suryakumar Yadav 50* (49); Saurabh Netravalkar 2/18 (4 overs)

India won by 7 wickets
Nassau County International Cricket Stadium, East Meadow
Umpires: Sam Nogajski (Aus) and Paul Reiffel (Aus)
Player of the match: Arshdeep Singh (Ind)

- India won the toss and elected to field.
- This was the first time India and United States faced each other in T20Is.
- India qualified for the Super 8 as a result of this match.

Match 30
14 June 2024
10:30 UTC−4
Scorecard

United States	v	Ireland

Match abandoned
Central Broward Park, Lauderhill
Umpires: Sharfuddoula (Ban) and Rod Tucker (Aus)

- No toss.
- No play was possible because of rain.
- United States qualified for the Super 8, while Canada, Ireland, and Pakistan were eliminated as a result of this match.

Match 33
15 June 2024
10:30 UTC−4
Scorecard

Canada	v	India

Match abandoned
Central Broward Park, Lauderhill
Umpires: Richard Kettleborough (Eng) and Sharfuddoula (Ban)

- No toss.
- No play was possible because of rain.

Match 36
16 June 2024
10:30 UTC−4
Scorecard

Ireland; 106/9 (20 overs)	v	Pakistan; 111/7 (18.5 overs)
Gareth Delany 31 (19); Imad Wasim 3/8 (4 overs)		Babar Azam 32* (34); Barry McCarthy 3/15 (4 overs)

Pakistan won by 3 wickets
Central Broward Park, Lauderhill
Umpires: Chris Gaffaney (NZ) and Rod Tucker (Aus)
Player of the match: Shaheen Afridi (Pak)

- Pakistan won the toss and elected to field.

=== Group B ===
Pos	Team	Pld	W	L	NR	Pts	NRR	Qualification
1	Australia	4	4	0	0	8	2.791	Advanced to the Super 8 stage
2	England	4	2	1	1	5	3.611	Advanced to the Super 8 stage
3	Scotland	4	2	1	1	5	1.255	Eliminated
4	Namibia	4	1	3	0	2	−2.585	Eliminated
5	Oman	4	0	4	0	0	−3.062	Eliminated

Source: ESPNcricinfo
Rules for classification: 1) Points; 2) Wins; 3) Net run rate; 4) Results of games between tied teams; 5) Initial group stage seedings

Match 3
2 June 2024
20:30 UTC−4 (N)
Scorecard

Oman; 109 (19.4 overs)	v	Namibia; 109/6 (20 overs)
Khalid Kail 34 (39); Ruben Trumpelmann 4/21 (4 overs)		Jan Frylinck 45 (48); Mehran Khan 3/7 (3 overs)

Match tied (Namibia won the Super Over)
Kensington Oval, Bridgetown
Umpires: Jayaraman Madanagopal (Ind) and Joel Wilson (WI)
Player of the match: David Wiese (Nam)

- Namibia won the toss and elected to field.
- Super Over: Namibia 21/0, Oman 10/1

Match 6
4 June 2024
10:30 UTC−4
Scorecard

Scotland; 90/0 (10 overs)	v	England
Michael Jones 45* (30)

No result
Kensington Oval, Bridgetown
Umpires: Nitin Menon (Ind) and Asif Yaqoob (Pak)

- Scotland won the toss and elected to bat.
- The match was reduced to 10 overs per side due to rain.
- England were set a revised target of 109 from 10 overs due to rain.
- No further play was possible due to rain.

Match 10
5 June 2024
20:30 UTC−4 (N)
Scorecard

Australia; 164/5 (20 overs)	v	Oman; 125/9 (20 overs)
Marcus Stoinis 67* (36); Mehran Khan 2/38 (4 overs)		Ayaan Khan 36 (30); Marcus Stoinis 3/19 (3 overs)

Australia won by 39 runs
Kensington Oval, Bridgetown
Umpires: Joel Wilson (WI) and Asif Yaqoob (Pak)
Player of the match: Marcus Stoinis (Aus)

- Oman won the toss and elected to field.
- David Warner became the leading run-scorer for Australia in T20Is, passing the previous record of 3,120 runs set by Aaron Finch.

Match 12
6 June 2024
15:00 UTC−4
Scorecard

Namibia; 155/9 (20 overs)	v	Scotland; 157/5 (18.3 overs)
Gerhard Erasmus 52 (31); Brad Wheal 3/33 (4 overs)		Richie Berrington 47* (35); Gerhard Erasmus 2/29 (4 overs)

Scotland won by 5 wickets
Kensington Oval, Bridgetown
Umpires: Jayaraman Madanagopal (Ind) and Nitin Menon (Ind)
Player of the match: Michael Leask (Sco)

- Namibia won the toss and elected to bat.

Match 17
8 June 2024
13:00 UTC−4
Scorecard

Australia; 201/7 (20 overs)	v	England; 165/6 (20 overs)
David Warner 39 (16); Chris Jordan 2/44 (4 overs)		Jos Buttler 42 (28); Pat Cummins 2/23 (4 overs)

Australia won by 36 runs
Kensington Oval, Bridgetown
Umpires: Nitin Menon (Ind) and Joel Wilson (WI)
Player of the match: Adam Zampa (Aus)

- England won the toss and elected to field.
- Chris Jordan (Eng) took his 100th wicket in T20Is.

Match 20
9 June 2024
13:00 UTC−4
Scorecard

Oman; 150/7 (20 overs)	v	Scotland; 153/3 (13.1 overs)
Pratik Athavale 54 (40); Safyaan Sharif 2/40 (4 overs)		Brandon McMullen 61* (31); Bilal Khan 1/12 (2.1 overs)

Scotland won by 7 wickets
Sir Vivian Richards Stadium, North Sound
Umpires: Chris Brown (NZ) and Allahudien Paleker (SA)
Player of the match: Brandon McMullen (Sco)

- Oman won the toss and elected to bat.
- Oman were eliminated as a result of this match.

Match 24
11 June 2024
20:30 UTC−4 (N)
Scorecard

Namibia; 72 (17 overs)	v	Australia; 74/1 (5.4 overs)
Gerhard Erasmus 36 (43); Adam Zampa 4/12 (4 overs)		Travis Head 34* (17); David Wiese 1/15 (1 over)

Australia won by 9 wickets
Sir Vivian Richards Stadium, North Sound
Umpires: Nitin Menon (Ind) and Rashid Riaz (Pak)
Player of the match: Adam Zampa (Aus)

- Australia won the toss and elected to field.
- Adam Zampa (Aus) became the first Australian cricketer to take 100 wickets in T20Is.
- Australia qualified for the Super 8 while Namibia were eliminated as a result of this match.

Match 28
13 June 2024
15:00 UTC−4
Scorecard

Oman; 47 (13.2 overs)	v	England; 50/2 (3.1 overs)
Shoaib Khan 11 (23); Adil Rashid 4/11 (4 overs)		Jos Buttler 24* (8); Kaleemullah 1/10 (1 over)

England won by 8 wickets
Sir Vivian Richards Stadium, North Sound
Umpires: Langton Rusere (Zim) and Asif Yaqoob (Pak)
Player of the match: Adil Rashid (Eng)

- England won the toss and elected to field.

Match 34
15 June 2024
13:00 UTC−4
Scorecard

England; 122/5 (10 overs)	v	Namibia; 84/3 (10 overs)
Harry Brook 47* (20); Ruben Trumpelmann 2/31 (2 overs)		Michael van Lingen 33 (29); Jofra Archer 1/15 (2 overs)

England won by 41 runs (DLS method)
Sir Vivian Richards Stadium, North Sound
Umpires: Adrian Holdstock (SA) and Langton Rusere (Zim)
Player of the match: Harry Brook (Eng)

- Namibia won the toss and elected to field.
- The match was reduced to 10 overs per side due to rain.
- Namibia were set a revised target of 126 from 10 overs due to rain.
- Niko Davin (Nam) became the first batter to be dismissed retired out in a T20 World Cup match.

Match 35
15 June 2024
20:30 UTC−4 (N)
Scorecard

Scotland; 180/5 (20 overs)	v	Australia; 186/5 (19.4 overs)
Brandon McMullen 60 (34); Glenn Maxwell 2/44 (4 overs)		Travis Head 68 (49); Mark Watt 2/34 (4 overs)

Australia won by 5 wickets
Daren Sammy Cricket Ground, Gros Islet
Umpires: Michael Gough (Eng) and Asif Yaqoob (Pak)
Player of the match: Marcus Stoinis (Aus)

- Australia won the toss and elected to field.
- England qualified for the Super 8 while Scotland were eliminated as a result of this match.

=== Group C ===
Pos	Team	Pld	W	L	NR	Pts	NRR	Qualification
1	West Indies (H)	4	4	0	0	8	3.257	Advanced to the Super 8 stage
2	Afghanistan	4	3	1	0	6	1.835	Advanced to the Super 8 stage
3	New Zealand	4	2	2	0	4	0.415	Eliminated
4	Uganda	4	1	3	0	2	−4.510	Eliminated
5	Papua New Guinea	4	0	4	0	0	−1.268	Eliminated

Source: ESPNcricinfo
Rules for classification: 1) Points; 2) Wins; 3) Net run rate; 4) Results of games between tied teams; 5) Initial group stage seedings
(H) Hosts

Match 2
2 June 2024
10:30 UTC−4
Scorecard

Papua New Guinea; 136/8 (20 overs)	v	West Indies; 137/5 (19 overs)
Sese Bau 50 (43); Andre Russell 2/19 (3 overs)		Roston Chase 42* (27); Assad Vala 2/28 (4 overs)

West Indies won by 5 wickets
Providence Stadium, Guyana
Umpires: Adrian Holdstock (SA) and Rashid Riaz (Pak)
Player of the match: Roston Chase (WI)

- West Indies won the toss and elected to field.

Match 5
3 June 2024
20:30 UTC−4 (N)
Scorecard

Afghanistan; 183/5 (20 overs)	v	Uganda; 58 (16 overs)
Rahmanullah Gurbaz 76 (45); Brian Masaba 2/21 (4 overs)		Robinson Obuya 14 (25); Fazalhaq Farooqi 5/9 (4 overs)

Afghanistan won by 125 runs
Providence Stadium, Guyana
Umpires: Kumar Dharmasena (SL) and Ahsan Raza (Pak)
Player of the match: Fazalhaq Farooqi (Afg)

- Uganda won the toss and elected to field.
- Fazalhaq Farooqi (Afg) took his maiden five-wicket haul in T20Is.

Match 9
5 June 2024
19:30 UTC−4 (N)
Scorecard

Papua New Guinea; 77 (19.1 overs)	v	Uganda; 78/7 (18.2 overs)
Hiri Hiri 15 (19); Frank Nsubuga 2/4 (4 overs)		Riazat Ali Shah 33 (56); Alei Nao 2/16 (4 overs)

Uganda won by 3 wickets
Providence Stadium, Guyana
Umpires: Adrian Holdstock (SA) and Rashid Riaz (Pak)
Player of the match: Riazat Ali Shah (Uga)

- Uganda won the toss and elected to field.
- This was the first World Cup match victory for Uganda across all formats.

Match 14
7 June 2024
19:30 UTC−4 (N)
Scorecard

Afghanistan; 159/6 (20 overs)	v	New Zealand; 75 (15.2 overs)
Rahmanullah Gurbaz 80 (56); Trent Boult 2/22 (4 overs)		Glenn Phillips 18 (18); Fazalhaq Farooqi 4/17 (3.2 overs)

Afghanistan won by 84 runs
Providence Stadium, Guyana
Umpires: Kumar Dharmasena (SL) and Ahsan Raza (Pak)
Player of the match: Rahmanullah Gurbaz (Afg)

- New Zealand won the toss and elected to field.
- This was Afghanistan's first win against New Zealand in T20Is.

Match 18
8 June 2024
20:30 UTC−4 (N)
Scorecard

West Indies; 173/5 (20 overs)	v	Uganda; 39 (12 overs)
Johnson Charles 44 (42); Brian Masaba 2/31 (4 overs)		Juma Miyagi 13* (20); Akeal Hosein 5/11 (4 overs)

West Indies won by 134 runs
Providence Stadium, Guyana
Umpires: Kumar Dharmasena (SL) and Rashid Riaz (Pak)
Player of the match: Akeal Hosein (WI)

- West Indies won the toss and elected to bat.
- Akeal Hosein (WI) took his maiden five-wicket haul in T20Is.
- This was West Indies highest winning margin by runs in T20I cricket.

Match 26
12 June 2024
20:30 UTC−4 (N)
Scorecard

West Indies; 149/9 (20 overs)	v	New Zealand; 136/9 (20 overs)
Sherfane Rutherford 68* (39); Trent Boult 3/16 (4 overs)		Glenn Phillips 40 (33); Alzarri Joseph 4/19 (4 overs)

West Indies won by 13 runs
Brian Lara Cricket Academy, San Fernando
Umpires: Ahsan Raza (Pak) and Alex Wharf (Eng)
Player of the match: Sherfane Rutherford (WI)

- New Zealand won the toss and elected to field.
- Nicholas Pooran became the leading run-scorer for West Indies in T20Is, passing the previous record of 1,899 runs set by Chris Gayle.
- West Indies qualified for the Super 8 as a result of this match.

Match 29
13 June 2024
20:30 UTC−4 (N)
Scorecard

Papua New Guinea; 95 (19.5 overs)	v	Afghanistan; 101/3 (15.1 overs)
Kiplin Doriga 27 (32); Fazalhaq Farooqi 3/16 (4 overs)		Gulbadin Naib 49* (36); Semo Kamea 1/16 (3 overs)

Afghanistan won by 7 wickets
Brian Lara Cricket Academy, San Fernando
Umpires: Michael Gough (Eng) and Alex Wharf (Eng)
Player of the match: Fazalhaq Farooqi (Afg)

- Afghanistan won the toss and elected to field.
- Afghanistan qualified for the Super 8 while New Zealand, Uganda and Papua New Guinea were eliminated as a result of this match.

Match 32
14 June 2024
20:30 UTC−4 (N)
Scorecard

Uganda; 40 (18.4 overs)	v	New Zealand; 41/1 (5.2 overs)
Kenneth Waiswa 11 (18); Tim Southee 3/4 (4 overs)		Devon Conway 22* (15); Riazat Ali Shah 1/10 (1 over)

New Zealand won by 9 wickets
Brian Lara Cricket Academy, San Fernando
Umpires: Richard Illingworth (Eng) and Paul Reiffel (Aus)
Player of the match: Tim Southee (NZ)

- New Zealand won the toss and elected to field.

Match 39
17 June 2024
10:30 UTC−4
Scorecard

Papua New Guinea; 78 (19.4 overs)	v	New Zealand; 79/3 (12.2 overs)
Charles Amini 17 (25); Lockie Ferguson 3/0 (4 overs)		Devon Conway 35 (32); Kabua Morea 2/4 (2.2 overs)

New Zealand won by 7 wickets
Brian Lara Cricket Academy, San Fernando
Umpires: Paul Reiffel (Aus) and Langton Rusere (Zim)
Player of the match: Lockie Ferguson (NZ)

- New Zealand won the toss and elected to field.
- Trent Boult, Tim Southee and Kane Williamson (NZ) all played in their last T20I match.
- Lockie Ferguson (NZ) became the second bowler to bowl four consecutive maiden overs in a T20I match.

Match 40
17 June 2024
20:30 UTC−4 (N)
Scorecard

West Indies; 218/5 (20 overs)	v	Afghanistan; 114 (16.2 overs)
Nicholas Pooran 98 (53); Gulbadin Naib 2/14 (2 overs)		Ibrahim Zadran 38 (28); Obed McCoy 3/14 (3 overs)

West Indies won by 104 runs
Daren Sammy Cricket Ground, Gros Islet
Umpires: Chris Brown (NZ) and Allahudien Paleker (SA)
Player of the match: Nicholas Pooran (WI)

- Afghanistan won the toss and elected to field.
- Nicholas Pooran (WI) scored 36 runs in an over off of Azmatullah Omarzai (Afg), the second such instance in a T20 World Cup match and fifth in T20Is overall.

=== Group D ===
Pos	Team	Pld	W	L	NR	Pts	NRR	Qualification
1	South Africa	4	4	0	0	8	0.470	Advanced to the Super 8 stage
2	Bangladesh	4	3	1	0	6	0.616	Advanced to the Super 8 stage
3	Sri Lanka	4	1	2	1	3	0.863	Eliminated
4	Netherlands	4	1	3	0	2	−1.358	Eliminated
5	Nepal	4	0	3	1	1	−0.542	Eliminated

Source: ESPNcricinfo
Rules for classification: 1) Points; 2) Wins; 3) Net run rate; 4) Results of games between tied teams; 5) Initial group stage seedings

Match 4
3 June 2024
10:30 UTC−4
Scorecard

Sri Lanka; 77 (19.1 overs)	v	South Africa; 80/4 (16.2 overs)
Kusal Mendis 19 (30); Anrich Nortje 4/7 (4 overs)		Quinton de Kock 20 (27); Wanindu Hasaranga 2/22 (3.2 overs)

South Africa won by 6 wickets
Nassau County International Cricket Stadium, East Meadow
Umpires: Chris Brown (NZ) and Richard Kettleborough (Eng)
Player of the match: Anrich Nortje (SA)

- Sri Lanka won the toss and elected to bat.
- This was the first T20I match played at this venue.
- This was Sri Lanka's lowest total in T20Is.

Match 7
4 June 2024
10:30 UTC−5
Scorecard

Nepal; 106 (19.2 overs)	v	Netherlands; 109/4 (18.4 overs)
Rohit Paudel 35 (37); Logan van Beek 3/18 (3.2 overs)		Max O'Dowd 54* (48); Dipendra Singh Airee 1/6 (2 overs)

Netherlands won by 6 wickets
Grand Prairie Stadium, Dallas
Umpires: Langton Rusere (Zim) and Rod Tucker (Aus)
Player of the match: Tim Pringle (Ned)

- Netherlands won the toss and elected to field.

Match 15
7 June 2024
19:30 UTC−5 (N)
Scorecard

Sri Lanka; 124/9 (20 overs)	v	Bangladesh; 125/8 (19 overs)
Pathum Nissanka 47 (28); Mustafizur Rahman 3/17 (4 overs)		Towhid Hridoy 40 (20); Nuwan Thushara 4/18 (4 overs)

Bangladesh won by 2 wickets
Grand Prairie Stadium, Dallas
Umpires: Michael Gough (Eng) and Paul Reiffel (Aus)
Player of the match: Rishad Hossain (Ban)

- Bangladesh won the toss and elected to field.
- This was Bangladesh's first win against Sri Lanka in T20 World Cup.

Match 16
8 June 2024
10:30 UTC−4
Scorecard

Netherlands; 103/9 (20 overs)	v	South Africa; 106/6 (18.5 overs)
Sybrand Engelbrecht 40 (45); Ottneil Baartman 4/11 (4 overs)		David Miller 59* (51); Vivian Kingma 2/12 (4 overs)

South Africa won by 4 wickets
Nassau County International Cricket Stadium, East Meadow
Umpires: Chris Gaffaney (NZ) and Sharfuddoula (Ban)
Player of the match: David Miller (SA)

- South Africa won the toss and elected to field.

Match 21
10 June 2024
10:30 UTC−4
Scorecard

South Africa; 113/6 (20 overs)	v	Bangladesh; 109/7 (20 overs)
Heinrich Klaasen 46 (44); Tanzim Hasan Sakib 3/18 (4 overs)		Towhid Hridoy 37 (34); Keshav Maharaj 3/27 (4 overs)

South Africa won by 4 runs
Nassau County International Cricket Stadium, East Meadow
Umpires: Richard Illingworth (Eng) and Sam Nogajski (Aus)
Player of the match: Heinrich Klaasen (SA)

- South Africa won the toss and elected to bat.

Match 23
11 June 2024
19:30 UTC−4 (N)
Scorecard

Nepal	v	Sri Lanka

Match abandoned
Central Broward Park, Lauderhill
Umpires: Chris Gaffaney (NZ) and Richard Kettleborough (Eng)

- No toss.
- No play was possible due to rain.
- South Africa qualified for the Super 8 as a result of this match.

Match 27
13 June 2024
10:30 UTC−4
Scorecard

Bangladesh; 159/5 (20 overs)	v	Netherlands; 134/8 (20 overs)
Shakib Al Hasan 64* (46); Paul van Meekeren 2/15 (4 overs)		Sybrand Engelbrecht 33 (22); Rishad Hossain 3/33 (4 overs)

Bangladesh won by 25 runs
Arnos Vale Stadium, Kingstown
Umpires: Chris Brown (NZ) and Jayaraman Madanagopal (Ind)
Player of the match: Shakib Al Hasan (Ban)

- Netherlands won the toss and elected to field.
- Sri Lanka were eliminated as a result of this match.

Match 31
14 June 2024
19:30 UTC−4 (N)
Scorecard

South Africa; 115/7 (20 overs)	v	Nepal; 114/7 (20 overs)
Reeza Hendricks 43 (49); Kushal Bhurtel 4/19 (4 overs)		Aasif Sheikh 42 (49); Tabraiz Shamsi 4/19 (4 overs)

South Africa won by 1 run
Arnos Vale Stadium, Kingstown
Umpires: Jayaraman Madanagopal (Ind) and Joel Wilson (WI)
Player of the match: Tabraiz Shamsi (SA)

- Nepal won the toss and elected to field.
- Nepal were eliminated as a result of this match.

Match 37
16 June 2024
19:30 UTC−4 (N)
Scorecard

Bangladesh; 106 (19.3 overs)	v	Nepal; 85 (19.2 overs)
Shakib Al Hasan 17 (22); Sompal Kami 2/10 (3 overs)		Kushal Malla 27 (40); Tanzim Hasan Sakib 4/7 (4 overs)

Bangladesh won by 21 runs
Arnos Vale Stadium, Kingstown
Umpires: Sam Nogajski (Aus) and Ahsan Raza (Pak)
Player of the match: Tanzim Hasan Sakib (Ban)

- Nepal won the toss and elected to field.
- Sandeep Lamichhane (Nep) took his 100th wicket in T20Is.
- Bangladesh qualified for the Super 8 while Netherlands were eliminated as a result of this match.

Match 38
16 June 2024
20:30 UTC−4 (N)
Scorecard

Sri Lanka; 201/6 (20 overs)	v	Netherlands; 118 (16.4 overs)
Charith Asalanka 46 (21); Logan van Beek 2/45 (4 overs)		Michael Levitt 31 (23); Nuwan Thushara 3/24 (3.4 overs)

Sri Lanka won by 83 runs
Daren Sammy Cricket Ground, Gros Islet
Umpires: Allahudien Paleker (SA) and Alex Wharf (Eng)
Player of the match: Charith Asalanka (SL)

- Netherlands won the toss and elected to field.

== Super 8 stage ==
The top two teams from groups A to D advanced to the Super 8 stage, where they were divided into two groups of four teams each. In the Super 8 stage, each team played the others in their group as a round-robin, with the top two teams from each group advancing to the knockout stage. No points were carried over from the group stage to the Super 8 stage. Prior to the tournament, eight teams had been seeded for the Super 8 stage based on their T20I rankings at that time: Australia, India, New Zealand, and Sri Lanka in Group 1; England, Pakistan, South Africa, and the West Indies in Group 2. New Zealand, Pakistan, and Sri Lanka did not qualify for the Super 8 stage, and their places were taken by Afghanistan, Bangladesh, and the United States.

Qualification		Super 8 stage	
Qualification		Group 1	Group 2
Advanced from the group stage (Top 2 teams from each group)	A	India	United States
Advanced from the group stage (Top 2 teams from each group)	B	Australia	England
Advanced from the group stage (Top 2 teams from each group)	C	Afghanistan	West Indies
Advanced from the group stage (Top 2 teams from each group)	D	Bangladesh	South Africa

=== Group 1 ===
Pos	Team	Pld	W	L	NR	Pts	NRR	Qualification
1	India	3	3	0	0	6	2.017	Advanced to the knockout stage
2	Afghanistan	3	2	1	0	4	−0.305	Advanced to the knockout stage
3	Australia	3	1	2	0	2	−0.331	Eliminated
4	Bangladesh	3	0	3	0	0	−1.709	Eliminated

Source: ESPNcricinfo
Rules for classification: 1) Points; 2) Wins; 3) Net run rate; 4) Results of games between tied teams; 5) T20I Rankings ahead of the tournament

Match 43
20 June 2024
10:30 UTC−4
Scorecard

India; 181/8 (20 overs)	v	Afghanistan; 134 (20 overs)
Suryakumar Yadav 53 (28); Rashid Khan 3/26 (4 overs)		Azmatullah Omarzai 26 (20); Jasprit Bumrah 3/7 (4 overs)

India won by 47 runs
Kensington Oval, Bridgetown
Umpires: Paul Reiffel (Aus) and Rod Tucker (Aus)
Player of the match: Suryakumar Yadav (Ind)

- India won the toss and elected to bat.

Match 44
20 June 2024
20:30 UTC−4 (N)
Scorecard

Bangladesh; 140/8 (20 overs)	v	Australia; 100/2 (11.2 overs)
Najmul Hossain Shanto 41 (36); Pat Cummins 3/29 (4 overs)		David Warner 53* (35); Rishad Hossain 2/23 (3 overs)

Australia won by 28 runs (DLS method)
Sir Vivian Richards Stadium, North Sound
Umpires: Michael Gough (Eng) and Richard Illingworth (Eng)
Player of the match: Pat Cummins (Aus)

- Australia won the toss and elected to field.
- Rain prevented any further play.
- Australia were above the DLS par score of 72 in 11.2 overs.
- Pat Cummins (Aus) took his first hat-trick in T20Is. This was the first hat-trick in the 2024 tournament and overall the seventh in the history of the T20 World Cup.

Match 47
22 June 2024
10:30 UTC−4
Scorecard

India; 196/5 (20 overs)	v	Bangladesh; 146/8 (20 overs)
Hardik Pandya 50* (27); Tanzim Hasan Sakib 2/32 (4 overs)		Najmul Hossain Shanto 40 (32); Kuldeep Yadav 3/19 (4 overs)

India won by 50 runs
Sir Vivian Richards Stadium, North Sound
Umpires: Michael Gough (Eng) and Adrian Holdstock (SA)
Player of the match: Hardik Pandya (Ind)

- Bangladesh won the toss and elected to field.
- Shakib Al Hasan (Ban) became the first bowler to take 50 wickets in T20 World Cup history.

Match 48
22 June 2024
20:30 UTC−4 (N)
Scorecard

Afghanistan; 148/6 (20 overs)	v	Australia; 127 (19.2 overs)
Rahmanullah Gurbaz 60 (49); Pat Cummins 3/28 (4 overs)		Glenn Maxwell 59 (41); Gulbadin Naib 4/20 (4 overs)

Afghanistan won by 21 runs
Arnos Vale Stadium, Kingstown
Umpires: Kumar Dharmasena (SL) and Ahsan Raza (Pak)
Player of the match: Gulbadin Naib (Afg)

- Australia won the toss and elected to field.
- Pat Cummins (Aus) took his second consecutive hat-trick in T20Is and became the only player to take more than one hat-trick in the T20 World Cup. This was the second hat-trick of the tournament and overall the eighth in the history of the T20 World Cup.
- This was Afghanistan's first win against Australia in T20Is.

Match 51
24 June 2024
10:30 UTC−4
Scorecard

India; 205/5 (20 overs)	v	Australia; 181/7 (20 overs)
Rohit Sharma 92 (41); Mitchell Starc 2/45 (4 overs)		Travis Head 76 (43); Arshdeep Singh 3/37 (4 overs)

India won by 24 runs
Daren Sammy Cricket Ground, Gros Islet
Umpires: Richard Illingworth (Eng) and Richard Kettleborough (Eng)
Player of the match: Rohit Sharma (Ind)

- Australia won the toss and elected to field.
- David Warner, Mitchell Starc and Matthew Wade (Aus) played their last T20I.
- Rohit Sharma (Ind) became the first player to hit 200 sixes in T20Is. He also became the highest run-scorer in T20Is, surpassing Babar Azam.
- India qualified for the semi-finals as a result of this match.

Match 52
24 June 2024
20:30 UTC−4 (N)
Scorecard

Afghanistan; 115/5 (20 overs)	v	Bangladesh; 105 (17.5 overs)
Rahmanullah Gurbaz 43 (55); Rishad Hossain 3/26 (4 overs)		Litton Das 54* (49); Rashid Khan 4/23 (4 overs)

Afghanistan won by 8 runs (DLS method)
Arnos Vale Stadium, Kingstown
Umpires: Nitin Menon (Ind) and Langton Rusere (Zim)
Player of the match: Naveen-ul-Haq (Afg)

- Afghanistan won the toss and elected to bat.
- Bangladesh were set a revised target of 114 runs off 19 overs due to rain.
- Rashid Khan (Afg) took his 150th wicket in T20Is.
- This was Afghanistan's first win against Bangladesh in T20 World Cup.
- Afghanistan qualified for the semi-finals while Australia and Bangladesh were eliminated as a result of this match.
- Afghanistan qualified for the semi-finals of any major ICC Tournament for the first time.

=== Group 2 ===
Pos	Team	Pld	W	L	NR	Pts	NRR	Qualification
1	South Africa	3	3	0	0	6	0.599	Advanced to the knockout stage
2	England	3	2	1	0	4	1.992	Advanced to the knockout stage
3	West Indies (H)	3	1	2	0	2	0.963	Eliminated
4	United States (H)	3	0	3	0	0	−3.906	Eliminated

Source: ESPNcricinfo
Rules for classification: 1) Points; 2) Wins; 3) Net run rate; 4) Results of games between tied teams; 5) T20I Rankings ahead of the tournament
(H) Hosts

Match 41
19 June 2024
10:30 UTC−4
Scorecard

South Africa; 194/4 (20 overs)	v	United States; 176/6 (20 overs)
Quinton de Kock 74 (40); Saurabh Netravalkar 2/21 (4 overs)		Andries Gous 80* (47); Kagiso Rabada 3/18 (4 overs)

South Africa won by 18 runs
Sir Vivian Richards Stadium, North Sound
Umpires: Chris Gaffaney (NZ) and Richard Kettleborough (Eng)
Player of the match: Quinton de Kock (SA)

- United States won the toss and elected to field.
- This was the first time South Africa and United States faced each other in T20Is.

Match 42
19 June 2024
20:30 UTC−4 (N)
Scorecard

West Indies; 180/4 (20 overs)	v	England; 181/2 (17.3 overs)
Johnson Charles 38 (34); Moeen Ali 1/15 (2 overs)		Phil Salt 87* (47); Roston Chase 1/19 (3 overs)

England won by 8 wickets
Daren Sammy Cricket Ground, Gros Islet
Umpires: Nitin Menon (Ind) and Ahsan Raza (Pak)
Player of the match: Phil Salt (Eng)

- England won the toss and elected to field.

Match 45
21 June 2024
10:30 UTC−4
Scorecard

South Africa; 163/6 (20 overs)	v	England; 156/6 (20 overs)
Quinton de Kock 65 (38); Jofra Archer 3/40 (4 overs)		Harry Brook 53 (37); Keshav Maharaj 2/25 (4 overs)

South Africa won by 7 runs
Daren Sammy Cricket Ground, Gros Islet
Umpires: Chris Brown (NZ) and Sharfuddoula (Ban)
Player of the match: Quinton de Kock (SA)

- England won the toss and elected to field.

Match 46
21 June 2024
20:30 UTC−4 (N)
Scorecard

United States; 128 (19.5 overs)	v	West Indies; 130/1 (10.5 overs)
Andries Gous 29 (16); Roston Chase 3/19 (4 overs)		Shai Hope 82* (39); Harmeet Singh 1/18 (2 overs)

West Indies won by 9 wickets
Kensington Oval, Bridgetown
Umpires: Allahudien Paleker (SA) and Paul Reiffel (Aus)
Player of the match: Roston Chase (WI)

- West Indies won the toss and elected to field.
- This was the first time West Indies and United States faced each other in T20Is.

Match 49
23 June 2024
10:30 UTC−4
Scorecard

United States; 115 (18.5 overs)	v	England; 117/0 (9.4 overs)
Nitish Kumar 30 (24); Chris Jordan 4/10 (2.5 overs)		Jos Buttler 83* (38)

England won by 10 wickets
Kensington Oval, Bridgetown
Umpires: Chris Gaffaney (NZ) and Joel Wilson (WI)
Player of the match: Adil Rashid (Eng)

- England won the toss and elected to field.
- This was the first time England and United States faced each other in T20Is.
- Chris Jordan (Eng) took his first hat-trick in T20Is and became the first English player to take hat-trick in T20 World Cup. This was the third hat-trick of the tournament and overall the ninth in the history of the T20 World Cup.
- England qualified for the semi-finals while United States were eliminated as a result of this match.

Match 50
23 June 2024
20:30 UTC−4 (N)
Scorecard

West Indies; 135/8 (20 overs)	v	South Africa; 124/7 (16.1 overs)
Roston Chase 52 (42); Tabraiz Shamsi 3/27 (4 overs)		Tristan Stubbs 29 (27); Roston Chase 3/12 (3 overs)

South Africa won by 3 wickets (DLS method)
Sir Vivian Richards Stadium, North Sound
Umpires: Rod Tucker (Aus) and Alex Wharf (Eng)
Player of the match: Tabraiz Shamsi (SA)

- South Africa won the toss and elected to field.
- South Africa were set a revised target of 123 runs off 17 overs due to rain.
- South Africa qualified for the semi-finals while West Indies were eliminated as a result of this match.

== Knockout stage ==
The knockout stage consisted of two semi-finals, played at Brian Lara Cricket Academy in San Fernando on 26 June and Providence Stadium in Guyana on 27 June, and the final, at Kensington Oval in Bridgetown on 29 June. The ICC had stated that if India qualified for the semi-finals, they would play in semi-final 2 at Providence Stadium in Guyana, for the match timings to be aligned with the local time in India.

=== Rules ===
Both semi-finals had an additional time of 250 minutes. In semi-final 1, 60 minutes was available on the scheduled date with another 190 minutes on the reserve day, while semi-final 2 had 250 minutes available only on the scheduled day and had no reserve day. The final, however, had a reserve day available on 30 June. If a reserve day came into play, the match would not be restarted but instead resumed from the previous day's play, if there was any.

In the event of no play on the scheduled day or the reserve day, in the semi-finals, the team that finished higher in the group stage would progress to the final, and if no play were possible in the final, the trophy would be shared. If any match ended in a tie, a Super Over would be used to determine the winner. If the scores in the Super Over were also tied, subsequent Super Overs will be played until there's a winner.

=== Bracket ===
Semi-finals
2W	South Africa	60/1 (8.5 overs)
1R	Afghanistan	56 (11.5 overs)
1W	India	171/7 (20 overs)
2R	England	103 (16.4 overs)

Final
SF1W	South Africa	169/8 (20 overs)
SF2W	India	176/7 (20 overs)

=== Semi-finals ===
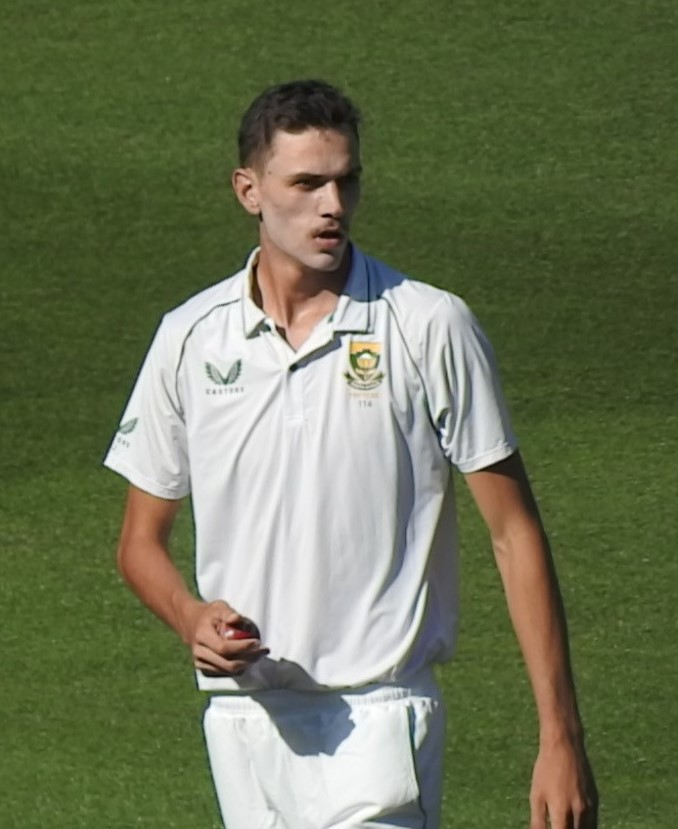
South Africa's Marco Jansen (pictured in 2022) was awarded with the Player of the match award for semi-final 1.

Semi-final 1
26 June 2024
20:30 UTC−4 (N)
Scorecard

Afghanistan; 56 (11.5 overs)	v	South Africa; 60/1 (8.5 overs)
Azmatullah Omarzai 10 (12); Tabraiz Shamsi 3/6 (1.5 overs)		Reeza Hendricks 29* (25); Fazalhaq Farooqi 1/11 (2 overs)

South Africa won by 9 wickets
Brian Lara Cricket Academy, San Fernando
Umpires: Richard Illingworth (Eng) and Nitin Menon (Ind)
Player of the match: Marco Jansen (SA)

- Afghanistan won the toss and elected to bat.
- This was the first time Afghanistan played in a major ICC tournament semi-final.
- Anrich Nortje (SA) took his 50th wicket in T20Is.
- Fazalhaq Farooqi (Afg) broke the record of most wickets at a single edition of the Men's T20 World Cup (17), previously held by Wanindu Hasaranga of Sri Lanka (16).
- Afghanistan posted their lowest T20I score. It was also the lowest score in a T20 World Cup semi-final.
- South Africa qualified for the T20 World Cup final for the first time.

Afghanistan played in their maiden semi-final but were bowled out 56 in 11.5 overs posting their lowest T20I score; and also the lowest score in a T20 World Cup semi-final, with the highest score being 10 off of 12 by Azmatullah Omarzai and South Africa's Tabraiz Shamsi taking 3/6 in 1.5 overs. In the second innings, South Africa managed to chase it down in only 8.5 overs with Reeza Hendricks's 29* off of 25 while losing only one wicket to Fazalhaq Farooqi. South Africa's Marco Jansen was awarded with the Player of the match award. South Africa qualified for their maiden World Cup final as a result of this match.

Semi-final 2
27 June 2024
10:30 UTC−4
Scorecard

India; 171/7 (20 overs)	v	England; 103 (16.4 overs)
Rohit Sharma 57 (39); Chris Jordan 3/37 (3 overs)		Harry Brook 25 (19); Kuldeep Yadav 3/19 (4 overs)

India won by 68 runs
Providence Stadium, Georgetown
Umpires: Chris Gaffaney (NZ) and Rod Tucker (Aus)
Player of the match: Axar Patel (Ind)

- England won the toss and elected to field.
- India qualified in the T20 World Cup final for the third time.

Throughout a rain-affected innings India managed to score 171 for the loss of 7 wickets, with the Indian captain Rohit Sharma scoring 57 off 39 balls and England's Chris Jordan taking 3/37 in 3 overs. In the second innings with the highest score being 25 off of 19 balls by Harry Brook, England were bowled out for 103 in 16.4 overs, with India's Kuldeep Yadav taking 3/19 in 4 overs. Indian spinner Axar Patel was awarded with the Player of the match award. India qualified for their third T20 World Cup final after previously having won the tournament in 2007 and being runner-up in 2014.

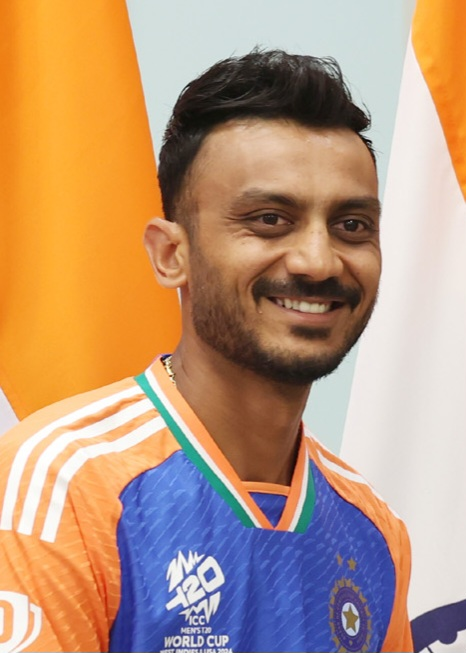
India's Axar Patel was awarded with the Player of the match award for semi-final 2.

=== Final ===
India won the toss and elected to bat first. Indian opener Virat Kohli was the only batter from his team to register a 50+ score; Axar Patel scored 47 runs, Shivam Dube scored 27 runs, while five other batters managed to register single-digit scores as India posted 176 runs for the loss of 7 wickets. Chasing the target, South African batter Heinrich Klaasen was the only batter from his team to register a 50+ score; Quinton de Kock, Tristan Stubbs and David Miller scored 39, 31, 21 runs respectively, while six other batters managed to register single-digit scores as South Africa posted 169 runs for the loss of 8 wickets to lose the match by 7 runs.

This was India's second T20 World Cup victory after their first win in 2007 and first win in a major ICC event in 11 years, with their previous win being the 2013 ICC Champions Trophy. India also became the first team in the T20 World Cup history to win the title undefeated throughout the tournament. Rohit Sharma became the third Indian captain to win a major ICC event after Kapil Dev and MS Dhoni. Virat Kohli was the highest run-scorer in the match with 76 runs from 59 balls and received the player of the match award. Sharma, Kohli and Ravindra Jadeja announced their retirement from the T20I cricket.

29 June 2024
Scorecard

India; 176/7 (20 overs)	v	South Africa; 169/8 (20 overs)

India won by 7 runs
Kensington Oval, Bridgetown

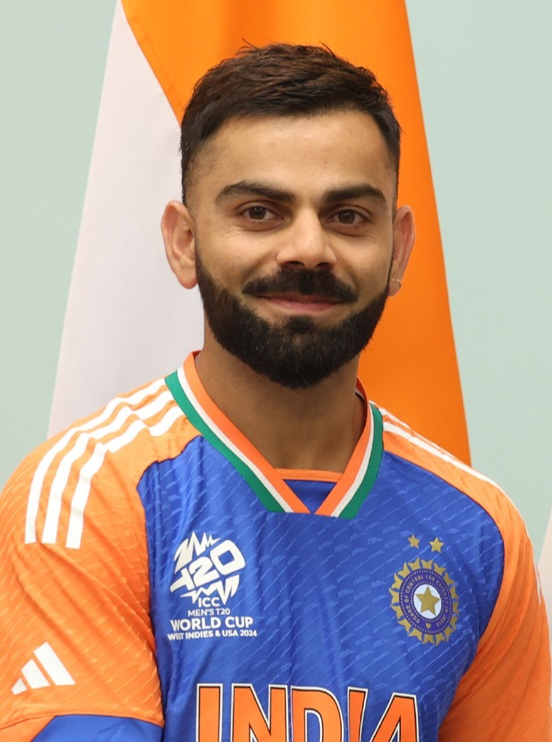
Virat Kohli scored the most runs for India in the final (76 runs off 59 balls) and was awarded the player of the match.

== Statistics ==
Rahmanullah Gurbaz of Afghanistan scored the most runs in the 2024 tournament (281 runs from 8 innings). Fazalhaq Farooqi of Afghanistan and Arshdeep Singh of India both took 17 wickets and were tied for the most wickets in the 2024 tournament. This was also the most wickets in a T20 World Cup.

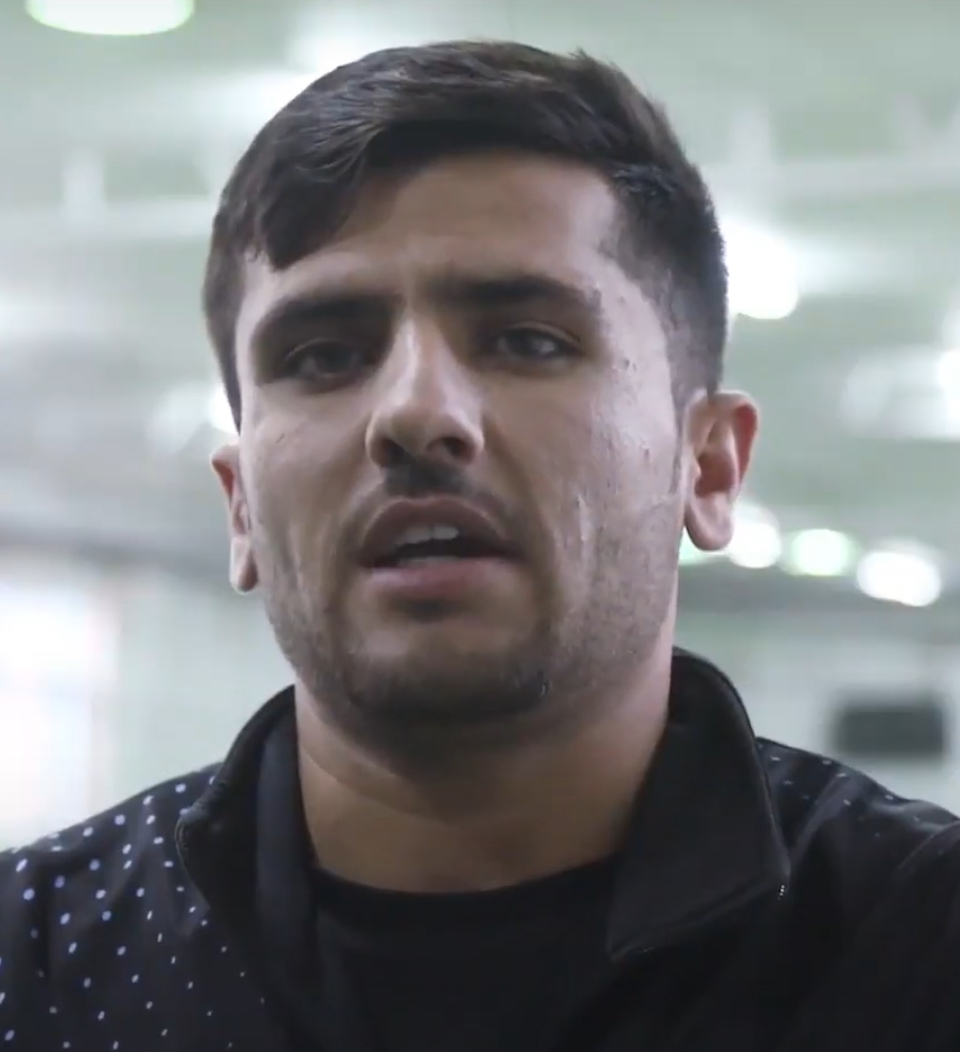
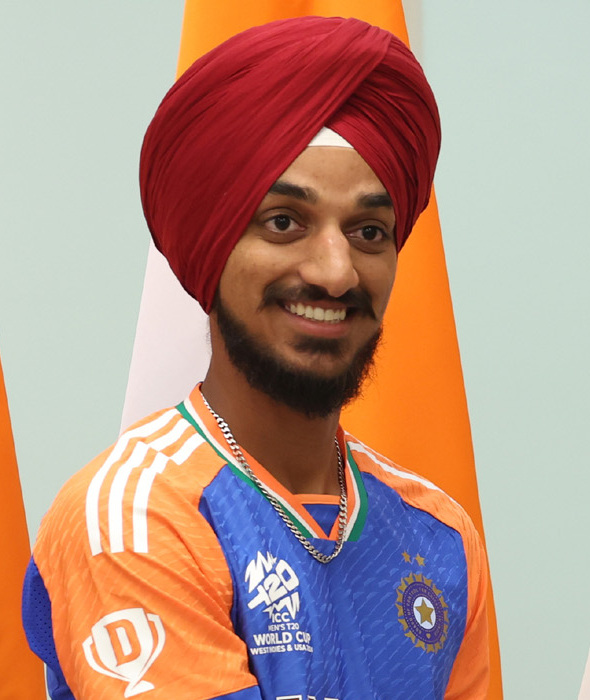
Fazalhaq Farooqi (pictured in 2021) of Afghanistan and Arshdeep Singh of India took the joint-most wickets (17) in the tournament and Farooqi also had the BBI of 5/9 against Uganda.

Most runs
Runs	Player	Team
281	Rahmanullah Gurbaz	Afghanistan
257	Rohit Sharma	India
255	Travis Head	Australia
243	Quinton de Kock	South Africa
231	Ibrahim Zadran	Afghanistan

Most wickets
Wickets	Player	Team
17	Fazalhaq Farooqi	Afghanistan
17	Arshdeep Singh	India
15	Jasprit Bumrah	India
15	Anrich Nortje	South Africa
14	Rashid Khan	Afghanistan

== Team of the tournament ==
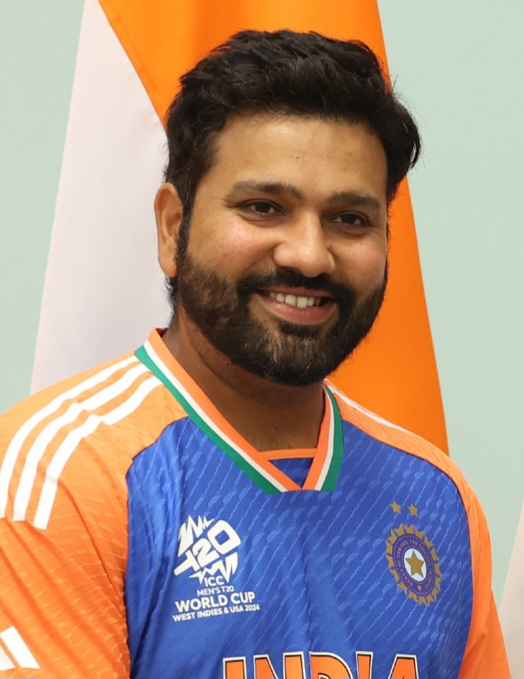
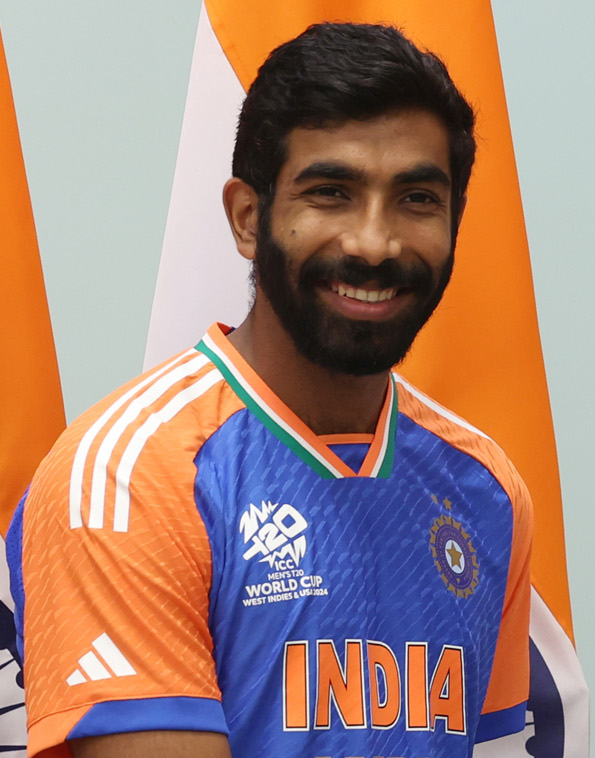
Indian captain Rohit Sharma and bowler Jasprit Bumrah were featured in the team of the tournament.

On 30 June, the ICC announced its team of the tournament with Jasprit Bumrah being named as player of the tournament for taking 15 wickets with an economy rate of 4.17, and Rohit Sharma as the captain of the team.

Team of the tournament
Player	Team	Role
Rohit Sharma	India	Batter (captain)
Rahmanullah Gurbaz	Afghanistan	Wicket-keeper
Nicholas Pooran	West Indies	Batter
Suryakumar Yadav	India	Batter
Marcus Stoinis	Australia	All-rounder
Hardik Pandya	India	All-rounder
Axar Patel	India	All-rounder
Rashid Khan	Afghanistan	Bowler
Jasprit Bumrah	India	Bowler
Arshdeep Singh	India	Bowler
Fazalhaq Farooqi	Afghanistan	Bowler
Anrich Nortje	South Africa	12th player

== Broadcasting ==
Disney Star served as host broadcaster for the tournament After having introduced smartphone-oriented vertical video broadcasts at the 2023 Cricket World Cup, using dedicated camera feeds, the vertical video feeds for this T20 World Cup shifted to using machine learning technology to automatically adapt the main 16:9 camera feeds to vertical and square video formats. The ICC also offered highlights from the Super 8 round onward through an immersive app for visionOS, which allowed users to view perspectives from various areas of the stadium.

In an effort to help promote the sport to U.S. audiences, the ICC partnered with American sports podcaster Jomboy, who has been known for producing cricket-related content targeting baseball viewers. He was hired as a contributor, including guest appearances as an analyst on selected matches to help explain the rules and strategy of the sport to new viewers.

Broadcasters for the tournament
Region	Country/Sub-region	Broadcasting licensee(s)	Broadcasting platforms	Radio
Africa	Middle East and North Africa	E&	CricLife Max; StarzPlay	—N/a
Africa	Sub-Saharan Africa	SuperSport	SS Cricket; DStv	—N/a
Americas	Canada	Willow	Willow TV; Cricbuzz	—N/a
Americas	Caribbean Islands	ESPN	ESPN Caribbean; ESPN Play	—N/a
Americas	United States	Willow	Willow TV; Cricbuzz	—N/a
Asia	Bangladesh	TSM	Nagorik TV; Toffee	Radio Shadhin and Radio Bhumi
Asia	India	Disney Star	Star Sports; Disney+ Hotstar	All India Radio
Asia	Pakistan	PTV	PTV Sports	Hum FM
Asia	Pakistan	Ten Sports	Ten Sports	Hum FM
Asia	Singapore	StarHub	Hub Sports	—N/a
Asia	Sri Lanka	Maharaja TV	TV 1	Lakhanda radio
Asia	United Arab Emirates	—N/a		Talk 100.3FM and Big 106.2
Europe	Ireland	Sky Sports	Sky Sports Cricket	—N/a
Europe	Netherlands	NOS	NOS	—N/a
Europe	United Kingdom	Sky Sports	Sky Sports Cricket; Sky Go	BBC Radio 5 Sports Extra
Oceania	Australia	Amazon	Prime Video	—N/a
Oceania	New Zealand	Sky TV NZ	Sky Sport	—N/a

== See also ==
- International cricket in 2024
- Associate international cricket in 2024
- 2024 Women's T20 World Cup
- 2024 Women's T20 World Cup final
- 2024 Women's T20 World Cup qualification
- 2024 Women's T20 World Cup squads
- International cricket in 2024–25
- Associate international cricket in 2024–25
