= List of Lanka Premier League five-wicket hauls =

In cricket, a five-wicket haul (also known as a "five-for" or "fifer") refers to a bowler taking five or more wickets in a single innings. This is regarded as a notable achievement by critics, especially in T20 cricket where a bowler can bowl a maximum of only 24 balls (4 overs). The Lanka Premier League (LPL) is a professional Twenty20 cricket league in Sri Lanka, which has been held since annually since its first season in 2020.

The first player to take a five-wicket haul in the Lanka Premier League is Mohammad Amir. He accomplished the feat on 7 December 2020, while playing for Galle Gladiators against Colombo Kings. He finished the game taking 5 wickets for 26 runs. Dushmantha Chameera holds the record of the least economic five-wicket haul, bowling at an economy rate of 13.75. The most economical five-wicket haul was taken by Wanindu Hasaranga of the B-Love Kandy, who claimed 6 wickets with an economy rate of 2.70. His figures of 6/9 is also the best bowling figures in an LPL match till date, which he achieved on 17 August 2023, against Jaffna Kings. Another bowler has taken a six-wicket haul in the LPL – Jeffrey Vandersay of Colombo Stars in 2021.

Hasaranga is also the youngest bowler to pick up a five-wicket haul in the Lanka Premier League, which he did in the same match, at the age of 26. In the same match, he also recorded the best strike rate in an innings for a five-wicket haul in the LPL. He also became the first player to take a five-wicket haul while captaining his side. The oldest bowler to grab a five-for in the LPL is Dushmantha Chameera, who took 5 wickets for 55 runs against Galle Gallants, on 26 July 2026, at the age of 34. Two five-wicket hauls have been taken at Mahinda Rajapaksa International Cricket Stadium and R. Premadasa Stadium each, jointly the most for a single venue.

In the six seasons played, six five-wicket hauls have been taken by different bowlers. Two five-wickets hauls have been taken by the players of the Galle franchise and the Colombo franchise, the joint highest for any team. On the other hand, Jaffna Kings have had two five-wicket hauls against them, which is more than any other team. The 2021 season saw the highest number of five-wicket hauls in a season. Two five-wicket hauls were taken in that season.

The first part of this list includes all the five-wicket hauls taken in the LPL in chronological order. The second part of the list provides an overview of five-wicket hauls by LPL seasons, and the third part provides an overview of five-wicket hauls by LPL teams.

== Key ==
Key
Symbol	Meaning
Date	Day on which the match was held
Inn	Innings in which the five-wicket haul was taken
Ovs	Number of overs bowled
Runs	Number of runs conceded
Wkts	Number of wickets taken
Econ	Runs conceded per over
Batsmen	Batsmen whose wickets were taken
Result	Result for the bowler's team

== Five-wicket hauls ==
Lanka Premier League five-wicket hauls
No.	Bowler	Date	Venue	Team	Opposition	Inn	Ovs	Runs	Wkts	Econ	Batsmen	Result
1	(Pakistan) Mohammad Amir	7 December 2020	Hambantota	Galle Gladiators	Colombo Kings	1	4	26	5	6.50	Dinesh Chandimal; Daniel Bell-Drummond; Thikshila de Silva; Isuru Udana; Qais Ahmad	Won
2	(Sri Lanka) Jeffrey Vandersay	17 December 2021	Colombo (RPS)	Colombo Stars	Kandy Warriors	2	4	25	6	6.25	Kennar Lewis; Minod Bhanuka; Charith Asalanka; Kamindu Mendis; Sachindu Colombage; Al-Amin Hossain	Won
3	(Sri Lanka) Nuwan Thushara	19 December 2021	Hambantota	Galle Gladiators	Jaffna Kings	2	3.5	13	5	3.39	Rahmanullah Gurbaz; Tom Kohler-Cadmore; Wanindu Hasaranga; Wahab Riaz; Maheesh Theekshana	Won
4	(Sri Lanka) Kasun Rajitha	14 December 2022	Pallekele	Colombo Stars	Dambulla Aura	1	4	22	5	5.50	Lasith Croospulle; Shevon Daniel; Jordan Cox; Tom Abell; Paul van Meekeren	Won
5	(Sri Lanka) Wanindu Hasaranga	17 August 2023	Colombo (RPS)	B-Love Kandy	Jaffna Kings	2	3.2	9	6	2.70	Chris Lynn; Dunith Wellalage; David Miller; Asela Gunaratne; Maheesh Theekshana; Nuwan Thushara	Won
6	(Sri Lanka) Dushmantha Chameera	26 July 2026	Dambulla	Dambulla Sixers	Galle Gallants	1	4	55	5	13.75	Nurul Hasan; Charith Asalanka; Sam Harper; Sahan Arachchige; Dasun Shanaka	Lost

== Season overview ==
Season wise statistics for five-wicket hauls
Season	No. of bowlers	No. of five wicket hauls	Best bowling figure	Best bowler	Ref
2020	1	1	5/26	(Pakistan) Mohammad Amir	
2021	2	2	6/25	(Sri Lanka) Jeffrey Vandersay	
2022	1	1	5/22	(Sri Lanka) Kasun Rajitha	
2023	1	1	6/9	(Sri Lanka) Wanindu Hasaranga	
2024	—N/a		4/10	(Pakistan) Shadab Khan	
2026	1	1	5/55	(Sri Lanka) Dushmantha Chameera	

== Team overview ==
Team wise statistics for five-wicket hauls
Team	No. of five wicket hauls	Best bowling figure	Best bowler	Ref
Kandy Royals	1	6/9	(Sri Lanka) Wanindu Hasaranga	
Colombo Kaps	2	6/25	(Sri Lanka) Jeffrey Vandersay	
Dambulla Sixers	1	5/55	(Sri Lanka) Dushmantha Chameera	
Galle Gallants	2	5/13	(Sri Lanka) Nuwan Thushara	
Jaffna Kings	0	4/10	(Sri Lanka) Dunith Wellalage	
