= 2017 Champions Trophy final =

2017 ICC Champions Trophy Final
- Match programme cover
- Event: 2017 ICC Champions Trophy
Pakistan	India
(Pakistan)	(India)
338/4	158
50	30.3
- Pakistan won by 180 runs
- Date: 18 June 2017
- Venue: The Oval, London
- Player of the match: Fakhar Zaman (Pak)
- Umpires: Marais Erasmus (SA) and Richard Kettleborough (Eng)
- Attendance: 26,000

The final of the 2017 ICC Champions Trophy was played on 18 June 2017 between Pakistan and India at The Oval in London, to determine the winner of the eighth edition of the ICC Champions Trophy. Pakistan qualified for the final by defeating the hosts England by 8 wickets in the first semi-final at Cardiff in Wales on 14 June, and reached their maiden Champions Trophy final. India, the defending champions, came into the final by defeating Bangladesh by 9 wickets in the second semi-final at Birmingham on 15 June, to reach their fourth Champions Trophy final, a record.

Pakistan won by 180 runs, which was the largest margin of victory in the final of an ICC ODI tournament. Pakistan, who were underdogs entering as the lowest-ranked team in the competition, became the seventh nation to win the Champions Trophy, and it was their first ICC ODI tournament title since the 1992 World Cup, as well as their latest ICC title in any format since the 2009 World Twenty20. Fakhar Zaman of Pakistan received the Man of the Match award for scoring 114. Shikhar Dhawan of India received the Golden Bat award for scoring 338 runs in the tournament while Hasan Ali of Pakistan received the Golden Ball award for taking 13 wickets; he was also adjudged the Man of the Series.

The match is estimated to have been watched by 400 million viewers, becoming the third most-watched game in cricketing history.

== Background ==
Pakistan and India share a historical rivalry in cricket. Prior to this match, the two sides had played 128 times against each other in ODIs, where Pakistan won 72 matches, India won 52 matches and four matches ended with no result. While Pakistan have had the upper hand bilaterally, India enjoyed an edge in global ICC tournaments where they won 13 times against Pakistan, and Pakistan won twice against India. The two sides met only twice before in the finals of global tournaments: the non-ICC World Championship of Cricket Final in 1985 and the 2007 ICC World Twenty20 Final, both won by India.

Prior to this match, the teams had met four times in the Champions Trophy and had two victories each. Pakistan's last win was in 2009; since then, India won seven games against Pakistan across all ICC tournaments consecutively although India lost the home series in 2012 Their most recent clash was on 4 June 2017, during the group stages of the ongoing Champions Trophy where India won by 124 runs (D/L method). Much of the pre-match analysis envisioned a strong contest between India's batting lineup and Pakistan's bowling side, both of which were considered the strengths of their respective teams and remained formidable in this tournament.

== Road to the final ==
=== Pakistan ===
Ranked eighth in the ICC ODI Championship at the start of the tournament, Pakistan started poorly, before improving progressively in each game. They lost to India in the first game by 124 runs, but then defeated top-ranked South Africa by 19 runs by virtue of Duckworth–Lewis method in their next game. They gained momentum and beat Sri Lanka by 3 wickets in their final group game, a thrilling must-win encounter, and qualified for the semi-finals placed second in Group B, behind India on net run rate. In the semi-final, England with their undefeated run and home advantage were tipped firm favourites. However, Pakistan won comprehensively by 8 wickets with almost 13 overs to spare. This paved the road for Pakistan's first qualification to a Champions Trophy final.

=== India ===
India came into the tournament as defending champions and favourites along with England, and were ranked third in the ICC ODI Championship. They beat arch-rivals Pakistan convincingly in their first group face-off, winning by 124 runs. They lost their second match to Sri Lanka by 7 wickets, despite posting a total of 321, in what turned out to be the highest successful run-chase in Champions Trophy history. India won their final group game, a must-win encounter against South Africa, comfortably by 8 wickets. They finished on top of Group B with two wins and a net run rate ahead of Pakistan. In the semi-final, India faced Bangladesh, and put in yet another dominating display, winning comfortably by 9 wickets and sealing a final with Pakistan.

== Match details ==
=== Match officials ===
Marais Erasmus of South Africa and Richard Kettleborough of England were named as the on-field umpires for the final. They had both previously officiated in the semi-final matches of the tournament; Erasmus, in the England–Pakistan match, and Kettleborough, in the Bangladesh–India match. Rod Tucker of Australia and Kumar Dharmasena of Sri Lanka, who also officiated in the semi-finals as on-field umpires, were appointed as the TV umpire and reserve umpire respectively. David Boon of Australia was the match referee, completing the five-member match official team.

- On-field umpires: Marais Erasmus (SA) and Richard Kettleborough (Eng)
- Third umpire: Rod Tucker (Aus)
- Reserve umpire: Kumar Dharmasena (SL)
- Match referee: David Boon (Aus)

=== Toss ===
India remained unchanged from the side that played the semi-final, while Pakistan brought back their leading pacer Mohammad Amir, who was ruled out of the semi-final against England due to back spasm and replaced Rumman Raees. Indian captain Virat Kohli won the toss and elected his side to field first, sending Pakistan in to bat.

=== Pakistan's innings ===
The Pakistani opening pair, Azhar Ali and Fakhar Zaman, put on 128 runs before Ali was run out for 59 runs off the last ball of the 22nd over. Zaman, who seemed to have been out for 3 runs, only for a no-ball by Jasprit Bumrah to save him, continued on his way to a 92-ball century – his first at ODI level – eventually falling to Hardik Pandya on the first ball of the 33rd over. He made 114 runs from 106 balls, which included twelve fours and three sixes. After his dismissal, the other Pakistani batsmen kept the score ticking over. Mohammad Hafeez plundered 57 not out from 37 balls, including four fours and three sixes. Pakistan eventually finished on 338/4 – their second-highest ODI score against India – after 50 overs. Bhuvneshwar Kumar was the pick of the Indian bowlers, finishing with 1/44 from 10 overs (including two maidens).

=== India's innings ===
India started poorly, losing two early wickets to Mohammad Amir. Off the third ball of the game, Rohit Sharma was out leg before wicket for a three-ball duck. In the third over, Virat Kohli was dropped in the slips for just five runs but caught on the next ball by Shadab Khan at point. Their poor form continued until, in the middle of the innings, Hardik Pandya and Ravindra Jadeja managed a rapid 80-run partnership prior to Pandya being run-out. However this was India's only batting highlight as the tail was quickly dismissed and India were all out after 30.3 overs, not even managing half of Pakistan's total. India lost by a massive 180 runs.

18 June
10:30
Scorecard

Pakistan; 338/4 (50 overs)	v	India; 158 (30.3 overs)
Fakhar Zaman 114 (106); Kedar Jadhav 1/27 (3 overs)		Hardik Pandya 76 (43); Mohammad Amir 3/16 (6 overs)

Pakistan won by 180 runs
The Oval, London
Umpires: Marais Erasmus (SA) and Richard Kettleborough (Eng)
Player of the match: Fakhar Zaman (Pak)

- India won the toss and elected to field.
- Fakhar Zaman (Pak) scored his first century in an ODI.
- Pakistan won the ICC Champions Trophy for the first time.
- Pakistan's total was their highest in any ICC tournament final.
- The margin of victory was the largest in any ICC ODI tournament final in terms of runs.

=== Scorecard ===
Pakistan innings
Player	Status	Runs	Balls	4s	6s	Strike rate
Azhar Ali	run out (†Dhoni/Bumrah)	59	71	6	1	83.09
Fakhar Zaman	c Jadeja b Pandya	114	106	12	3	107.54
Babar Azam	c Yuvraj b Jadhav	46	52	4	0	88.46
Shoaib Malik	c Jadhav b Kumar	12	16	0	1	75.00
Mohammad Hafeez	not out	57	37	4	3	154.05
Imad Wasim	not out	25	21	1	1	119.04
Sarfraz Ahmed *†	did not bat					
Mohammad Amir	did not bat					
Shadab Khan	did not bat					
Hasan Ali	did not bat					
Junaid Khan	did not bat					
Extras	(lb 9; w 13; nb 3)	25				
Total	(4 wickets; 50 overs)	338		27	9	

Fall of wickets: 1/128 (Azhar, 22.6 ov), 2/200 (Fakhar, 33.1 ov), 3/247 (Malik, 39.4 ov), 4/267 (Babar, 42.3 ov)

India bowling
Bowler	Overs	Maidens	Runs	Wickets	Econ	Wides	NBs
Bhuvneshwar Kumar	10	2	44	1	4.40	1	0
Jasprit Bumrah	9	0	68	0	7.55	5	3
Ravichandran Ashwin	10	0	70	0	7.00	4	0
Hardik Pandya	10	0	53	1	5.30	1	0
Ravindra Jadeja	8	0	67	0	8.37	0	0
Kedar Jadhav	3	0	27	1	9.00	2	0

India innings
Player	Status	Runs	Balls	4s	6s	Strike rate
Rohit Sharma	lbw b Amir	0	3	0	0	0.00
Shikhar Dhawan	c †Sarfraz b Amir	21	22	4	0	95.45
Virat Kohli *	c Shadab b Amir	5	9	0	0	55.55
Yuvraj Singh	lbw b Shadab	22	31	4	0	70.96
MS Dhoni †	c Wasim b Hasan	4	16	0	0	25.00
Kedar Jadhav	c †Sarfraz b Shadab	9	13	2	0	69.23
Hardik Pandya	run out (Hafeez/Hasan)	76	43	4	6	176.74
Ravindra Jadeja	c Babar b Junaid	15	26	0	0	57.69
Ravichandran Ashwin	c †Sarfraz b Hasan	1	3	0	0	33.33
Bhuvneshwar Kumar	not out	1	8	0	0	12.50
Jasprit Bumrah	c †Sarfraz b Hasan	1	9	0	0	11.11
Extras	(lb 2; w 1)	3				
Total	(all out; 30.3 overs)	158		14	6	

Fall of wickets: 1/0 (Sharma, 0.3 ov), 2/6 (Kohli, 2.4 ov), 3/33 (Dhawan, 8.6 ov), 4/54 (Yuvraj, 12.6 ov), 5/54 (Dhoni, 13.3 ov), 6/72 (Jadhav, 16.6 ov), 7/152 (Pandya, 26.3 ov), 8/156 (Jadeja, 27.3 ov), 9/156 (Ashwin, 28.1 ov), 10/158 (Bumrah, 30.3 ov)

Pakistan bowling
Bowler	Overs	Maidens	Runs	Wickets	Econ	Wides	NBs
Mohammad Amir	6	2	16	3	2.66	0	0
Junaid Khan	6	1	20	1	3.33	1	0
Mohammad Hafeez	1	0	13	0	13.00	0	0
Hasan Ali	6.3	1	19	3	2.92	0	0
Shadab Khan	7	0	60	2	8.57	0	0
Imad Wasim	0.3	0	3	0	6.00	0	0
Fakhar Zaman	3.3	0	25	0	7.14	0	0

Key

- * Captain
- † – Wicket-keeper
- c Fielder – Indicates that the batsman was dismissed by a catch by the named fielder
- b Bowler – Indicates which bowler gains credit for the dismissal

== Aftermath ==
The Pakistani team were greeted with a heroic welcome by fans upon their return home. Prime Minister Nawaz Sharif posted a congratulatory message on social media, and announced a cash reward of Rs. 1 crore (US$36,000) for each player. A ceremony was held for the players at the Prime Minister's Secretariat on 4 July. The property developer Bahria Town presented a sum of Rs. 10 lakh (US$3,600) for every player, and awarded a one kanal plot to Fakhar Zaman for his performance.

In India, the loss was met with agitation by several fans. However, many Indians also commended Pakistan's performance and expressed solidarity with the Indian team regardless of the result. In Kashmir, widespread pro-Pakistan celebrations were reported amongst locals. Twenty-one Indian men who were allegedly celebrating Pakistan's victory were charged under India's sedition laws, and remanded in custody. The charges were dropped a few days later after the complainants accused the police of filing a "false case".

Two days after the match, India coach Anil Kumble stepped down from his position, amid reports of a rift between him and some of the players including captain Virat Kohli.

Pakistan's ICC team ranking for ODIs improved from eighth to sixth position, jumping ahead of Sri Lanka and Bangladesh. In the bowlers' rankings, Hasan Ali climbed 12 spots to reach seventh, while Babar Azam rose by three ranks to fifth on the batting rankings.

In November 2017, Pakistan Post issued Rs. 10 commemorative postage stamps and souvenir sheet priced at Rs. 50 to mark the victory.

== See also ==
- 2007 ICC World Twenty20 Final
- India v Pakistan (2011 Cricket World Cup)
