= Mohammad Amir =

Pakistani cricketer (born 1992)

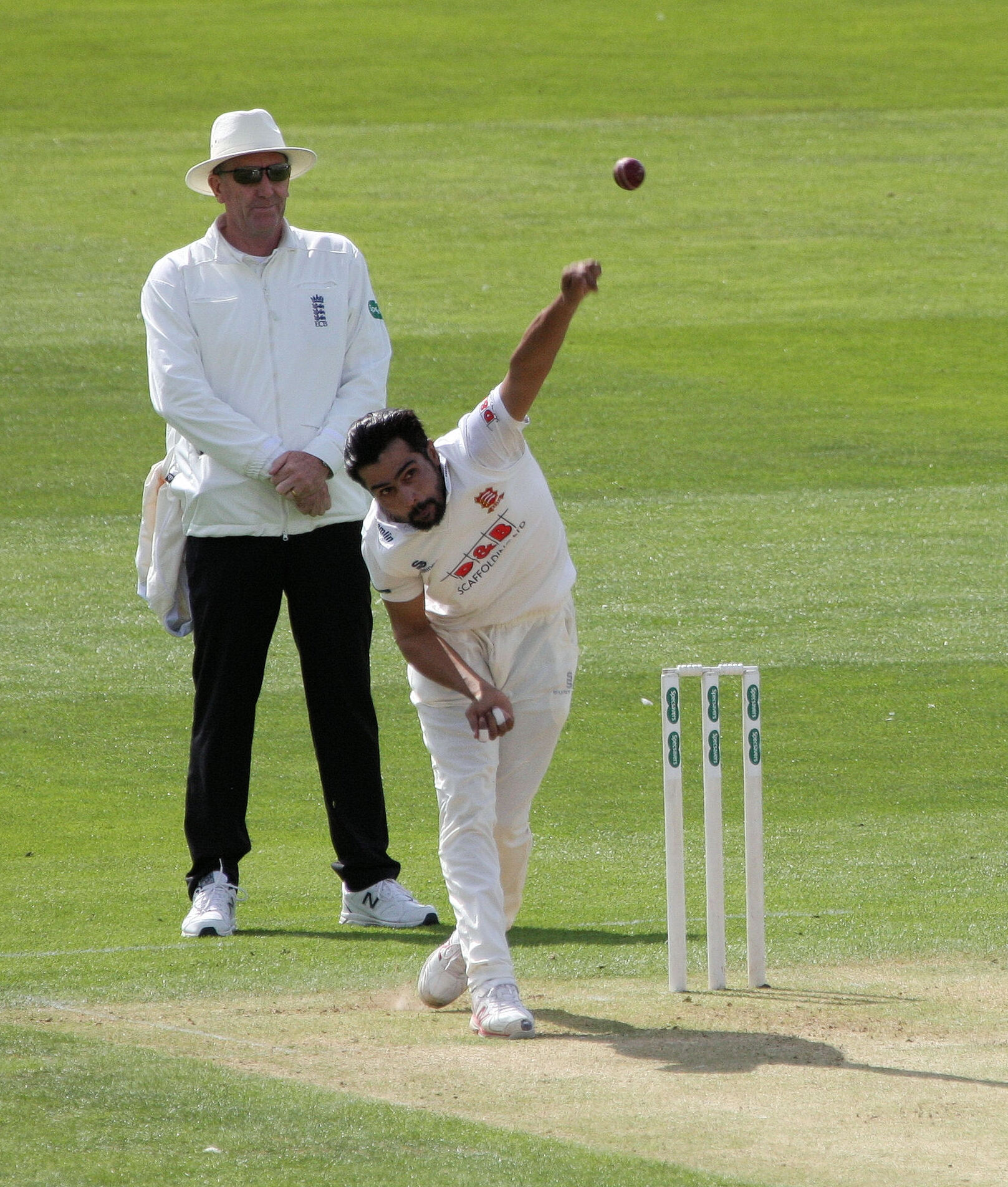
- Amir playing county in 2017

Personal information
- Born: 13 April 1992 (age 34); Gujar Khan, Punjab, Pakistan
- Height: 6 ft 2 in (188 cm)
- Batting: Left-handed
- Bowling: Left-arm fast
- Role: Bowler

International information
- National side: Pakistan (2009–2024)
- Test debut (cap 194): 4 July 2009 v Sri Lanka
- Last Test: 11 January 2019 v South Africa
- ODI debut (cap 173): 30 July 2009 v Sri Lanka
- Last ODI: 2 October 2019 v Sri Lanka
- ODI shirt no.: 5 (previously 90)
- T20I debut (cap 32): 7 June 2009 v England
- Last T20I: 16 June 2024 v Ireland
- T20I shirt no.: 5 (previously 90)

Domestic team information
- Years: Team
- 2008/09: Federal Areas
- 2008–2010: National Bank of Pakistan
- 2007–2015: Rawalpindi Rams
- 2015: Chittagong Vikings (squad no. 5)
- 2016–2023: Karachi Kings (squad no. 5)
- 2017: Dhaka Dynamites (squad no. 5)
- 2017–2019, 2025: Essex (squad no. 5)
- 2019/20: Khulna Tigers (squad no. 5)
- 2020: Galle Gladiators
- 2022: Gloucestershire
- 2022–2023: Jamaica Tallawahs
- 2023: Sylhet Strikers
- 2024: Desert Vipers
- 2024: Derbyshire
- 2024–2025: Quetta Gladiators
- 2025/26: Sylhet Titans
- 2026: Rawalpindiz

Career statistics
Competition	Test	ODI	T20I	FC
Matches	36	61	62	69
Runs scored	751	363	65	1384
Batting average	13.41	18.15	7.22	15.72
100s/50s	0/0	0/2	0/0	0/2
Top score	48	73*	21*	66
Balls bowled	7619	3013	1321	12796
Wickets	119	81	71	266
Bowling average	30.48	29.63	21.94	22.63
5 wickets in innings	4	1	0	13
10 wickets in match	0	0	0	2
Best bowling	6/44	5/30	4/13	7/61
Catches/stumpings	5/0	8/0	10/0	15/0
Medal record
Men's Cricket
Representing Pakistan
T20 World Cup
Winner	2009 England & Wales
Champions Trophy
Winner	2017 England & Wales
- Source: ESPNCricinfo, 7 January 2024

Mohammad Amir (Note: Punjabi: محمد عامر) (Punjabi: [mʊɦəˈməd aːmɪɾ] or [aːmə'ɾ]; born 13 April 1992) is a Pakistani cricketer who played for the Pakistan national cricket team from 2009 to 2024. A left-arm fast bowler and left-handed batsman, he plays for Rawalpindiz in the Pakistan Super League. He was a member of the Pakistan teams that won the 2009 ICC World Twenty20 and the 2017 ICC Champions Trophy.

Amir made his international debut at the age of 17 during the 2009 ICC World Twenty20 and helped Pakistan win the tournament. In the 2017 Champions Trophy final, he was pivotal in Pakistan's victory over India, taking the wickets of Rohit Sharma, Virat Kohli, and Shikhar Dhawan.

In 2010, Amir was arrested for spot-fixing after bowling deliberate no-balls during Pakistan's tour of England. He received a five-year ban from the International Cricket Council and was convicted of conspiracy charges at Southwark Crown Court, serving three months in prison. He returned to international cricket in January 2016.

Amir retired from international cricket in December 2020, citing ill-treatment by the Pakistan Cricket Board management. He briefly came out of retirement for the 2024 ICC Men's T20 World Cup before retiring again in December 2024.

== Early and personal life ==
Amir was born on 13 April 1992 in Changa Bangial, Gujar Khan, Punjab, Pakistan into a Punjabi family. The second youngest of seven children, consisting of six sons and a daughter, his father Raja Mohammad Fayyaz served in the Pakistan Army before taking a government job as a watchman in a school.

Growing up, his idol was Wasim Akram, claiming, "Wasim Akram is my favourite bowler, he's my idol. When I used to watch him on TV, I would try to see what exactly he was doing with the ball. Then I would go outside and imitate his actions and bowling."

In 2003, at the age of 11, Amir was spotted at a local tournament and was invited to join the sports academy set up by Asif Bajwa, who was the chairman of Bajwa Cricket Academy, in Rawalpindi.

After joining the national team, Amir moved to Lahore with his family to be closer to top-flight cricket facilities.

Amir married British citizen and lawyer Narjis Amir in September 2016. Together they have three daughters, Minsa Amir (b. 2017), Zoya Amir (b. 2020) and Ayra Amir (b. 2022). Amir was reported to have acquired a British citizenship in May 2026.

== Domestic and T20 career ==
Amir was first selected as a fast bowler by the former Pakistani fast bowler Wasim Akram at a fast bowling camp in 2007. Amir, then 15 years old, went on a tour of England with the Pakistan U-19 cricket team and was one of the leading bowlers. He took 8 wickets at an average of 16.37 runs. In 2008, he took 4 wickets in successive matches against Sri Lanka and England. In this tri-nation tournament played in Sri Lanka he again excelled with his speed and swing bowling taking 9 wickets at an average of 11.22 in three matches. Due to injury he played only a limited part in the 2008 ICC Under-19 Cricket World Cup held in Malaysia.

In March 2008, he made his domestic debut for the Rawalpindi Rams whilst concurrently representing the National Bank of Pakistan. His debut domestic season resulted in him taking 55 first-class wickets for NBP. He took a lot of top order wickets including those of players in the national team. This strong domestic form resulted in him making his international breakthrough in the 2009 Twenty20 World Cup.

In July 2019, he was selected to play for the Dublin Chiefs in the inaugural edition of the Euro T20 Slam cricket tournament. However, the following month the tournament was cancelled. In November 2019, he was selected to play for the Khulna Tigers in the 2019–20 Bangladesh Premier League. In October 2020, he was drafted by the Galle Gladiators for the inaugural edition of the Lanka Premier League. He took 5 wickets for 26 runs against Colombo Kings, becoming the first player to take a five-wicket haul in the LPL.

In November 2021, he was selected to play for the Galle Gladiators following the players' draft for the 2021 Lanka Premier League. In December 2021, he was signed by the Karachi Kings following the players' draft for the 2022 Pakistan Super League.

== T10 franchise career ==
He was signed by Bangla Tigers for the 2021–22 T10 League but made himself unavailable after testing positive for COVID-19.

== International career ==
=== Debut years ===
Amir made his international debut against England in the group stages of the 2009 ICC World Twenty20. He took the wicket of Ravi Bopara with only his second ball, with Shoaib Malik taking a fine catch, and conceded only one run in his debut international over. Amir made his One Day International match debut against Sri Lanka taking 3 wickets at an economy rate of 4.50 and also scoring 23 runs.

After his successful 2009 T20 World Cup tournament, Amir was selected in the test squad for Pakistan for the series in Sri Lanka. He was chosen alongside fast bowler Umar Gul and Abdur Rauf, ahead of more notable and experienced names such as Sohail Tanvir. He started his Test career well, taking six wickets in the match, which included the wicket of Sri Lankan captain Kumar Sangakkara in both innings, as well as the Sri Lankan batsman, Mahela Jayawardene's wicket in the 2nd innings. However he did not get any wickets in his next two Test matches. His next test wickets came in New Zealand where he managed to take four wickets in the first Test match, during a losing game. He won his first Test match with the Pakistan team during his 5th Test match, as Pakistan won comprehensively by 141 runs, he managed to take three wickets in the match including the wicket of Taylor, who scored 97 runs in the second innings. He shone brightly with the bat as well and showed a solid technique for a lower order batsman.

=== World Twenty20 championships ===
Amir continued to impress as the 2009 ICC World Twenty20 tournament continued, taking a wicket in his opening spell in 6 of the 7 games he played, including the final. He was particularly effective at using the short ball, with his skiddy bouncers rushing onto the batsmen, often causing them to mishit the ball for a catch. Amir consistently clocked speeds of above 145 kilometers per hour (90 miles per hour) and bowled his quickest delivery in the 2009 ICC World Twenty20 final against Sri Lanka, at 152 kilometers per hour (94.4 miles per hour). His most important moment arguably came in the opening over of the 2009 Twenty20 World Cup final against Sri Lanka. He bowled with speed and with consecutive short deliveries to the tournament's top scorer Tillakaratne Dilshan, obtained his wicket on the fifth delivery, and managed to end the over with a wicket maiden.

In the initial stages of the 2010 World Cup Amir took three wickets in a five wicket-maiden over in a Twenty20 International match against Australia. The other two men were run out in the same over. This set a world record of three wickets for a bowler in Twenty20 and 5 wickets for a team in one over.

=== Pakistan Cricket Board contract ===
Amir was ignored by the Pakistan Cricket Board when they awarded cricket contracts to Abdul Razzaq and Mohammad Yousuf, even after his exceptional performance in the 2009 ICC World Twenty20. Later on the Pakistan Cricket Board awarded Amir a 'C' category contract.

=== Making a mark in the international arena ===
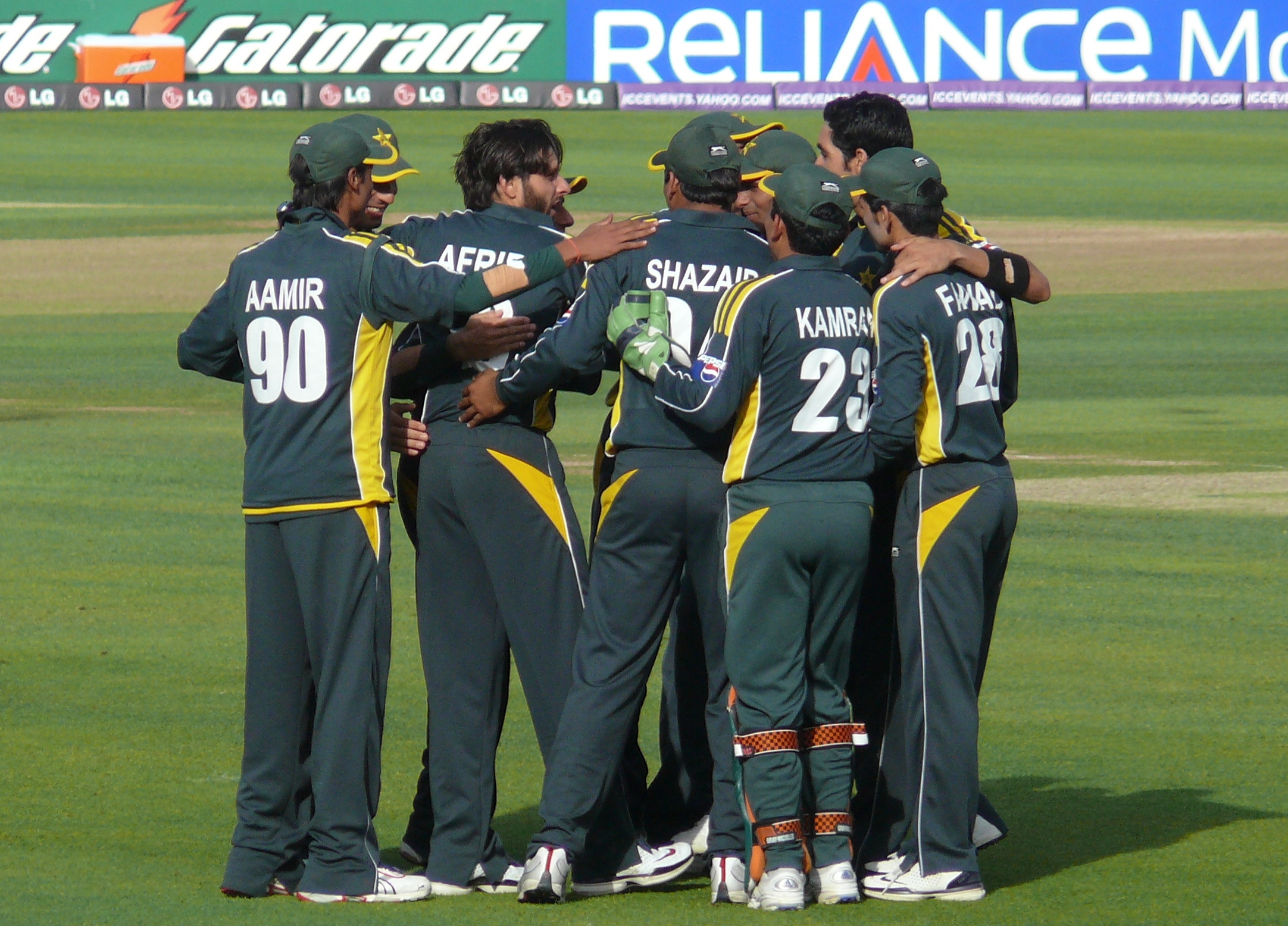
Amir (left) with Pakistan in 2009

On 9 November 2009 he scored 73 runs against New Zealand which was a record for a number 10 batsman in ODI history until Ravi Rampaul surpassed that record with scoring 86* when batting at number 10 position in 2011. In that innings, with his batting partner Saeed Ajmal, Amir added 103 runs to Pakistan's chase, only to fall short by 7 runs.

He impressed the Pakistan cricket team, including Wasim Akram, who took credit for discovering Amir, although Akram later commented that Amir needed to gain more weight to aid his development.

Later in 2009, Pakistan toured Sri Lanka and in the first One Day International match, he shared a 62 run partnership with fast bowler Umar Gul for the tenth wicket but Pakistan lost by 36 runs. He also played a game against New Zealand in 2009–2010. During a match in the third One Day International match, when Pakistan was reduced to 8 wickets for 86 runs, he scored 73 runs not out, making the highest score by a number 10 batsman in One Day International cricket and putting on a 103 runs, 10th wicket partnership with Saeed Ajmal. He was unable to get his team to their victory target of 212 runs, as Ajmal was declared out in the last over and Pakistan lost by just 7 runs.

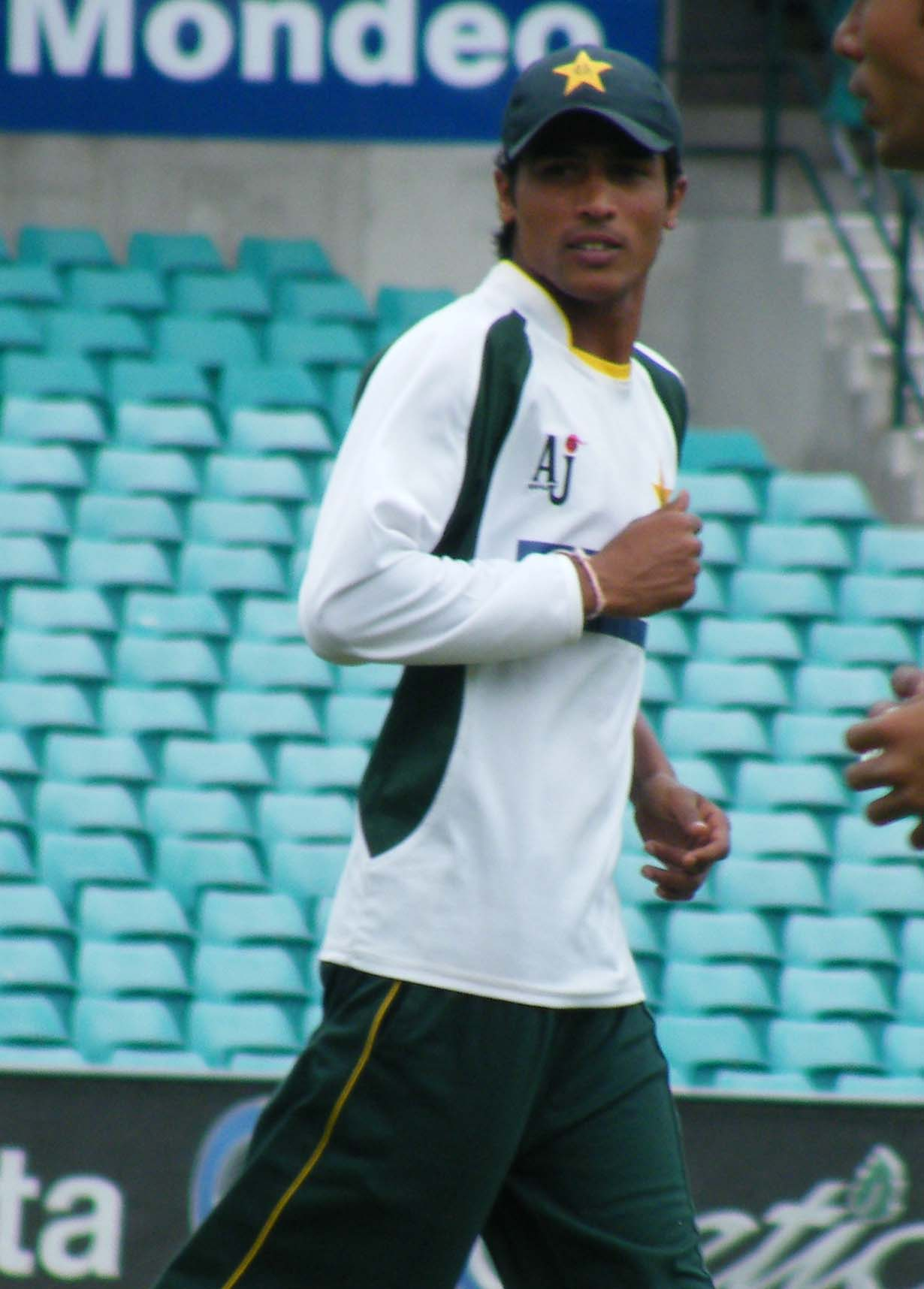
Amir during training in 2010

During the Test match series against Australia in 2010, at the Melbourne Cricket Ground, he took his first five wicket haul, taking the wickets of Australian batsmen Ricky Ponting, Michael Hussey and Michael Clarke. On 24 July 2010 he was influential in helping Pakistan win the 2nd Test match against Australia; the first Test match Pakistan had won against them in 15 years, which also drew the series 1–1. During this match he took 7 wickets overall, and was declared man of the match. Overall, in the second series, he was the leading wicket taker of both teams with his 11 scalps.

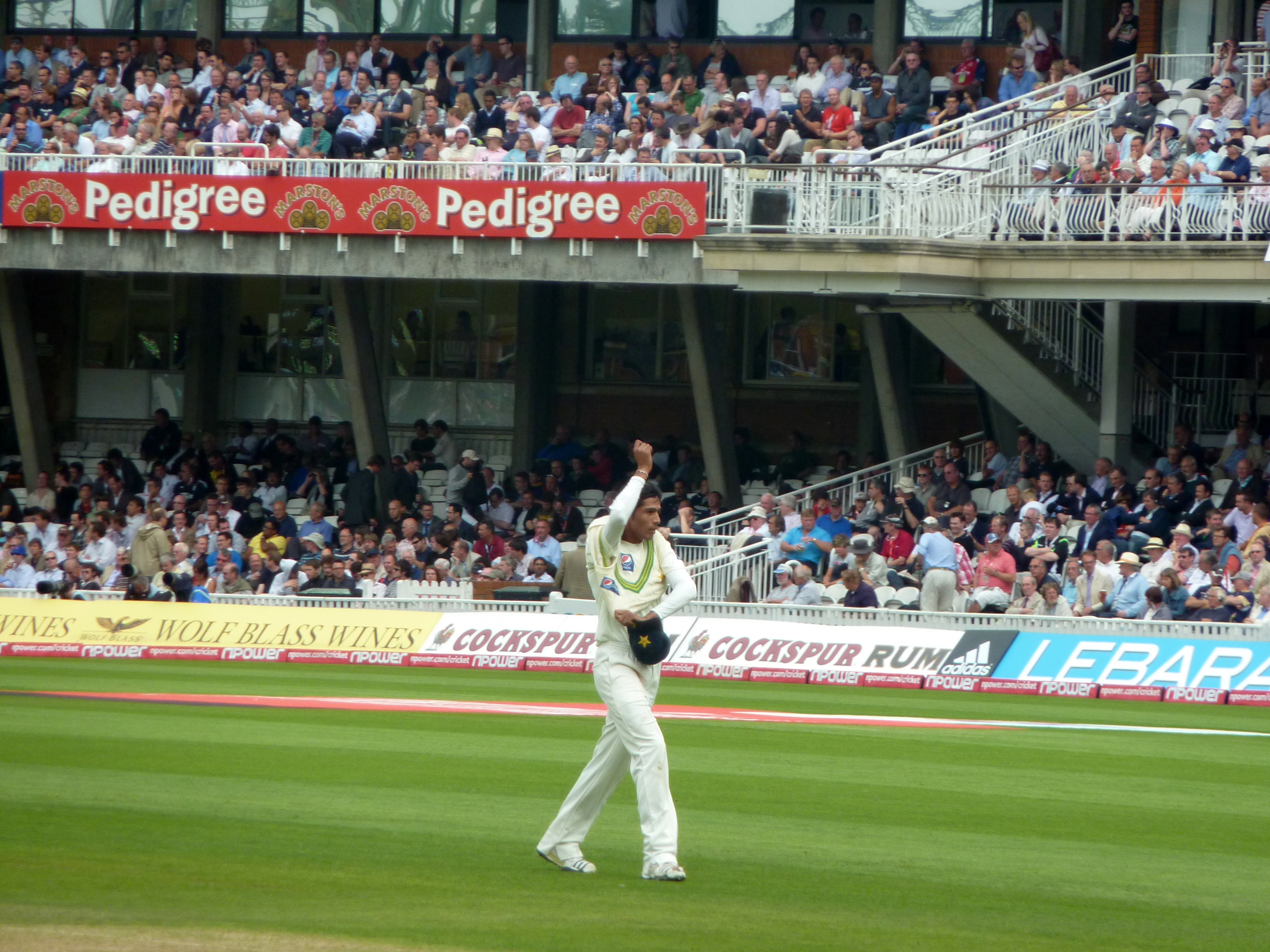
Mohammad Amir in the outfield during Pakistan's third Test against England in August 2010.

In the summer of 2010, Amir was awarded the man of the match award for becoming the youngest player ever to take a five-wicket haul in England. He also became the youngest player to take 50 test wickets, earning praise from several former international cricketers. In that eventful series against England, he took 19 wickets, the highest of the Pakistanis and third highest overall at an outstanding average of 18.3. He also took 2 five-wicket hauls.

=== International comeback ===
After five years, on 13 March 2015, Amir made his domestic comeback playing for Omar Associates in the grade II patron's trophy. He took a wicket in his first comeback over.

On 19 August 2015, Mohammad Amir was declared completely free to play all forms of cricket from 2 September 2015. On 15 January 2016, he made his return to international cricket in a T20I match against New Zealand. In February 2016, Amir took a hat-trick in a Pakistan Super League match for Karachi Kings. He also participated to the first T20I edition of Asia Cup in 2016 and also for the 2016 ICC World Twenty20. He later made his international comeback against England, where he was taunted by English fans chanting "No Ball!" at him.

On 30 August 2016, against England at Nottingham Amir scored 58 after coming at no.11 and became the first cricketer to score a half century in ODIs after coming last in the batting order. He was dropped for the next match against England two days later.

He along with Sarfraz Ahmed set the record for the highest 8th wicket partnership in ICC Champions Trophy (75*).

=== 2016 Asia Cup ===
Following his return to international cricket, Amir participated in the 2016 Asia Cup. In the fourth match of the tournament, Amir produced one of his best spells against arch rival India. Batting first, Pakistan were bowled out for 83. Amir took 2 wickets in the first over, thus putting the Indian team under pressure. However, as the target was modest, India chased the target with four overs to spare, Amir finished with 3/18 in that match. He continued his fine performance throughout the tournament and finished with 7 wickets with an economy under 6.

=== 2017 ICC Champions Trophy ===
Amir played his second ICC ODI tournament in the 2017 ICC Champions Trophy. During the first two games against arch rivals India and South Africa, Amir failed to pick up wickets but was economical with the figures of 0/32 (8.1) and 0/50 (10) respectively. It was in the Sri Lanka game where he picked up his first wickets. He picked important wickets of Angelo Mathews and Niroshan Dickwella and ended with figures of 2/53 (10). But his important contribution came from bat where he scored 28 from 63. Chasing Sri Lanka's target of 237, Pakistan was struggling at 162/7 before he arrived and, along with skipper Sarfraz Ahmed, shared an unbeaten stand of 75 to guide his team to their fourth semi final of their Champions Trophy.

Amir missed the semi-final against England due to back spasms. But his absence was barely noticeable as his replacement, Rumman Raees bowled well on debut with 2/44. Pakistan won that match by 8 wickets.

Amir was pivotal in helping Pakistan win the 2017 ICC Champions Trophy by claiming top three wickets against arch-rivals India in the Final. Amir entered his second ICC final. It was against India, who were in a comfortable position. After Pakistan posted a challenging total of 338, it was the Indian batsmen that needed to be taken care of. Their top three batsmen, Rohit Sharma, Shikhar Dhawan and Virat Kohli scored 70% of India's runs in the tournament. Amir got them all out. He trapped Sharma in front for LBW where he was given a three ball duck. Then he took the Indian skipper for 5. Kohli, at first, was dropped by Azhar Ali at first slip. However, he didn't have to wait much to take the wicket, making him edge the next ball to point where Shadab Khan took a good catch. Amir got his third after he bowled a cross seamer to Dhawan, which he edged to the wicket-keeper, Sarfaraz Ahmed for 21. Amir finished with the figures of 3/16 (6). It was Amir's dream spell as his team bowled out the defending champions for 158, winning by 180 runs.

Amir has rated Indian cricketer Virat Kohli as the best batsman in the world. Kohli also rated Amir as one of the ‘toughest’ bowlers to face in the world cricket.

=== 2018 Asia Cup ===
Amir's performance in the Asia Cup was mediocre. During the 3 games Amir played, he was unable to pick up a single wicket. Hence, for the last match he was dropped. In his final Asia Cup game against India, Amir was trounced for 41 runs in his 5 overs without picking up a single wicket. His performance was criticised by both his countrymen and the cricketing world.

=== 2019 Cricket World Cup ===
In May 2019, he was named in Pakistan's squad for the 2019 Cricket World Cup, after the Pakistan Cricket Board (PCB) named their final fifteen-man squad for the tournament. On 12 June 2019, in the match against Australia, Amir took his first five-wicket haul in ODIs. He finished the tournament as the leading wicket-taker for Pakistan, with 17 dismissals in eight matches.

=== Retirement from Test cricket ===
Mohammad Amir announced his retirement from Test Cricket in July 2019. He finished his test career with an average of 30.47 and taking 144 wickets. He played a total of 36 tests since his debut in 2009.

=== International retirement and return to national team ===
Alleging ill-treatment from the PCB, Amir announced on 17 December 2020 that he would not be available for selection for his national team anymore. He had cited "mental torture" by the management as the reason behind his decision and openly criticized the Pakistan team management and coaching staff including Waqar Younis and Misbah-ul-Haq on more than one occasion. He also said that they tried to spoil his image and it took a lot of hard work to build his image. However, Younis denied the allegations and stated he was hurt by the comments.

On 24 March 2024, Amir reversed his decision to retire, and after "positive discussions" with the PCB, made himself available for selection ahead of the T20 World Cup scheduled for June that year. In April, he was included in the squad for the T20I home series against New Zealand. In his comeback match, the second T20I of the series played at Rawalpindi, he claimed two wickets in a seven-wicket win.

=== 2024 T20 World Cup ===
In May 2024, he was named in Pakistan's squad for the 2024 ICC Men's T20 World Cup tournament. He took seven wickets in four matches during the tournament, with an impressive average of 10.28.

=== Second international retirement ===
Amir announced his retirement from international cricket for the second time in December 2024.

== Controversy ==
=== Spot-fixing ===
In August 2010, the English newspaper News of the World published video evidence alleging that Amir and fellow bowler Mohammad Asif had deliberately bowled no-balls during Pakistan's 2010 tour of England in return for payment from a betting syndicate, arranged through their agent Mazhar Majeed. Scotland Yard arrested Majeed, and the ICC provisionally suspended Amir, Asif, and captain Salman Butt under its Anti-Corruption Code.

Amir and Butt's appeals against the suspension were rejected by the ICC in October 2010. Following a tribunal, the ICC banned Amir for five years on 5 February 2011, while Asif received a seven-year ban and Butt a ten-year ban.

On 1 November 2011, Amir, Butt, and Asif were convicted at Southwark Crown Court of conspiracy to cheat at gambling and conspiracy to accept corrupt payments, after Amir pleaded guilty. Amir was sentenced to six months in a young offenders' institution and was released on 1 February 2012 after serving half his sentence. He returned to international cricket in January 2016.

As a result of the allegations and video posted by News of the World, Scotland Yard announced during the evening that they had arrested Majeed on charges of suspicion of conspiracy to defraud bookmakers.

The allegations also affected the Mohammad Amir brand as the official Pakistani kit supplier BoomBoom Cricket announced that they had temporarily suspended their ties with Amir until further details on the allegations had emerged. BoomBoom stated that they will "make a complete decision once his [Amir] fate had been decided by the authorities".

The Pakistani selector Yawar Saeed announced that Amir and the two other accused Salman Butt and Mohammad Asif had withdrawn from the Pakistani tour of England due to the mental torture suffered by the allegations. Amir also continued to protest his innocence in the allegations.

=== Suspension, tribunal and ban ===
On 2 September 2010, after the warm-up List A game between Pakistan and Somerset, the International Cricket Council announced that they had suspended Amir under the provisions of the ICC's Anti-Corruption Code. The statement from the ICC stated that the three players (Asif, Amir and Salman Butt) were charged "under various offences under Article 2 of the ICC Anti-Corruption Code for Players and Player Support Personnel relating to alleged irregular behaviour during, and in relation to, the fourth Test between England and Pakistan at Lord's last month".

Amir has got the sympathy of several ex-cricketers, including that of former England captain Michael Atherton. In an article for the News of the World, Atherton asserted that Amir is an asset to the game and must not be given a harsh punishment, considering his immense talent and young age. Atherton, now a journalist and broadcaster, recalled how Nasser Hussain, also an ex-England skipper, had summed up the mood at Lord's the previous Sunday:

"Nasser Hussain, who I once saw walking around the team hotel in Sri Lanka in the early hours of the morning before a Test match unable to sleep, so worried was he about his form, spoke for us all when he said, 'Please don't let it be the kid'."

Atherton added: "The 'kid' in question was Mohammad Aamer, the young, good-looking and prodigiously-talented Pakistan bowler who had blown England away on the second morning at Lord's with a mesmeric spell of left-arm bowling and who now, we had been told, had overstepped the front line twice for a few dollars more."

Former South Africa bowler Henry Williams, called for Mohammad Amir to be treated with compassion if found guilty of spot fixing.

The ICC announced that Amir, Mohammad Asif and Salman Butt had filed appeals to their ICC. suspensions and set their hearing on 30 and 31 October 2010 in Qatar. The Pakistan Interior Ministry also gave the three players their passports back so that they could travel to the hearing being held in Qatar.

The Pakistan Cricket Board barred Mohammad Amir, Mohammad Asif and Salman Butt from using the National Cricket Academy in Gaddafi Stadium. They have been barred until their names have been cleared of spot-fixing The board said that Butt had used the facilities before the notices were sent and Asif and Amir have not used them.

Amir and Butt's appeals were heard by the ICC on 30 and 31 October 2010. They were however rejected and the players remained provisionally suspended. The case did not decide whether Amir is guilty but only if his suspension should be lifted. Both Butt and Amir hit out at the ICC stating they hadn't been given any evidence as to why their suspensions were rejected. Because the players couldn't participate in international cricket all three had their contracts also provisionally suspended by the Pakistan Cricket Board.

Mohammad Amir stated that he was desperate to return to international cricket. He stated that he had been keeping his fitness levels high and that he had been participating in club cricket.

Reports also emerged by Geo News that stated that Scotland Yard might call Amir, Mohammad Asif and Salman Butt back into the UK to complete the spot-fixing investigation Amir's teammate Butt who was also implicated in the Spot-fixing scandal announced that he wanted a delay in his hearing because he wanted the Scotland Yard investigation to be completed first. However Amir and Asif announced they were to go ahead with their trials as planned because they wanted a decision to be reached quickly so that they could be selected for the World Cup squad.

Amir, Butt, and Asif had a tribunal in front of a three-man panel of members of the ICC from 6–11 January 2011. Amir's lawyers requested that the tribunal not announce its findings at the conclusion of the tribunal, wanting the tribunal to have the time necessary to fully review the evidence. The tribunal announced at its conclusion that they would announce their findings and any possible restrictions about a month later (the fifth of February 2011). The tribunal did announce that while additional charges against Salman Butt were filed over statements Majeed had made about the Third Test, that Amir and Asif would not face any charges over that test.

On 5 February 2011, the ICC tribunal handed Amir a five-year ban, his teammate Mohammad Asif was handed a seven-year ban and Salman Butt was given a 10-year ban from participating in any cricketing related activities which are governed by the ICC or any of its members. Shortly after the decision Amir announced his intent to appeal the decision to the Court of Arbitration Amir also stated that he hoped to return to International Cricket soon, stating he had "received confidence and support from Pakistani fans supporting him outside the Qatar Financial Centre". Some former players around the world such as Michael Vaughan, Andrew Flintoff and Ian Healy called for Amir to be banned for life. On 15 September 2011 Amir has reportedly admitted to his involvement in last year's spot-fixing scandal before a court in England.

=== Criminal conviction ===
On 1 November 2011, Salman Butt and Mohammad Asif were convicted at Southwark Crown Court, along with Amir who had previously pleaded guilty, of conspiracy to cheat at gambling and conspiracy to accept corrupt payments. He was sentenced to 6 months in Feltham Young Offenders Institution on 3 November, whilst Butt and Asif were sentenced to 30 months and 12 months in prison respectively. Mazhar Majeed was sentenced to two years and eight months. Amir, along with Butt, appealed against the length of their sentences, however this was dismissed by Lord Judge, the Lord Chief Justice on 23 November. Amir was later transferred to Portland Young Offenders Institute in Dorset, from which he was released on 1 February 2012, having served half of his six-month sentence.

== Playing style ==
Amir's bowling had been noted for his run-up and a whippy left-arm action with a high-arm release position that would generated late swing. He was also known for his high-intensity pace and accuracy. However, following the completion of his five-year spot-fixing ban, analysts such as Osman Samiuddin and Nick Miller highlighted a decline in his physical capabilities: the mature Amir retained his trademark slinging left-arm delivery and shuffling run-up but data analysis had shown that he lost significant pace and that his deliveries lacked the lateral swing of his youth. To compensate for the loss of natural movement, his tactical approach shifted, relying on a significantly higher percentage of full-length deliveries (~19.35%) compared to his pre-ban baseline of under 5%.

== See also ==
- List of cricketers banned for match fixing
- List of Lanka Premier League five-wicket hauls
