= Janapareddy Tarakeswara Rao =

Indian cricket scorer and umpire (born 1980)

Personal information
- Born: 7 January 1980 (age 46); Visakhapatnam, India

Umpiring information
- Source: ESPNcricinfo, 22 June 2020

Janapareddy Tarakeswara Rao (born 7 January 1980) is an Indian cricket Scorer and umpire. He officiated as official scorer in Ranji Trophy tournament matches and three ODI games. His first ODI match as official scorer was the 7th ODI during West Indies tour of India at Vijayawada on 24 November 2002, his second ODI was the 2nd ODI during Pakistan tour of India at Visakhapatnam on 5 April 2005, and his third ODI was 2nd ODI during Australia tour of India at Visakhapatnam on 20 October 2010. He later moved to the US and currently lives in North Carolina.
