= 2007 World Twenty20 final =

2007 ICC World Twenty20 Final
- A poster giving tribute to the champion Indian team
- Event: 2007 ICC World Twenty20
157/5	152
20 overs	19.3 overs
- India won by 5 runs
- Date: 24 September 2007
- Venue: Wanderers Stadium, Johannesburg
- Player of the match: Irfan Pathan (Ind)
- Umpires: Mark Benson (Eng) and Simon Taufel (Aus)
- Attendance: 32,217

The 2007 ICC World Twenty20 Final was a Twenty20 International (T20I) cricket match played between India and Pakistan in Johannesburg, South Africa. Administered by the ICC, it was the culmination of the 2007 ICC World Twenty20, which was the inaugural edition of the Men's T20 World Cup. India won the T20 World Cup title by defeating Pakistan by five runs in the final. The two teams had previously met in a Group D match of the tournament, which was also won by India.

== Road to the final ==
In Group D, after initial games against Scotland, rivals India and Pakistan met at Kingsmead Cricket Ground, Durban, South Africa. After India got to 141 for 9 in their twenty overs, a Misbah-ul-Haq run-out on the last ball of the game saw the match head into a bowl-out which India won 3–0 with Virender Sehwag, Harbhajan Singh and Robin Uthappa scoring for India.

In the Super 8s, India lost to New Zealand by 10 runs. India then defeated England and host South Africa by 18 and 37 runs. Meanwhile, Pakistan beat Sri Lanka by 33 runs. Pakistan also defeated Australia and chased Bangladesh to win by four wickets.

The first semi-final was a tight contest between Pakistan and New Zealand, which Pakistan won by six wickets. India faced Australia in the second semi-final match, the lead alternating until India turned it around to win their spot in the final.

== Preview ==
Ahead of the final, Pakistani newspapers predicted a victory for Pakistan due to the fact that the match would be held during the month of Ramadan. Sambit Bal wrote on ESPNcricinfo that "There is little to choose between the teams, and it might just boil down to who can hold their nerve best."

== Match ==
=== Match officials ===
- On-field umpires: Mark Benson (Eng) and Simon Taufel (Aus)
- TV umpire: Daryl Harper (Aus)
- Reserve umpire: Billy Doctrove (WI)
- Match referee: Ranjan Madugalle (SL)

=== Team composition ===
The Indian team made one change from their semi-final against Australia: Yusuf Pathan went into the lineup to replace Virender Sehwag, who was unavailable for fitness issues. Pakistan also made one change with Fawad Alam being replaced by Yasir Arafat.

=== Match summary ===
After winning the coin toss and electing to bat first, India lost their opening wicket in the third over when Yusuf Pathan mistimed his shot to be caught by Shoaib Malik for 15. The next wicket to fall was Robin Uthappa, with another mistimed shot ending his innings on eight. Settling down, Gautam Gambhir played his shots (he achieved top score for India with 75 from 54 balls including 8 fours and 2 sixes). On the other end, Yuvraj Singh was caught out from a Umar Gul delivery to end the 63-run partnership. After MS Dhoni was bowled by Gul for 6, the innings slowed between over 14 to 18. Rohit Sharma made some late-order hitting which brought India to 157 for 5 in the twenty overs. For Pakistan, Gul was the best of the bowlers as he took three wickets while Asif and Sohail Tanvir each took a wicket.

In the run chase, Pakistan lost Hafeez in the first over while Akmal was bowled by an in-swinger from R. P. Singh. After a twenty-one run-over from S. Sreesanth, Imran Nazir was run out Robin Uthappa on 33, which started a brief collapse with the wickets of Younis Khan, Shoaib Malik, Shahid Afridi and Yasir Arafat putting Pakistan to 104 for 7. Misbah-ul-Haq remained strong at the other end with support from the tail-enders, and reached within thirteen runs of the target; however, he lost his wicket, with the gamble of going over short-fine leg ending in a Sreesanth catch. This resulted in India winning by five runs. The pick of the bowlers was Irfan Pathan and R. P. Singh, who each collected three wickets; Joginder Sharma and S. Sreesanth also got into the wickets with two and one, respectively.

24 September
14:00
Scorecard

India; 157/5 (20 overs)	v	Pakistan; 152 (19.3 overs)
Gautam Gambhir 75 (54); Umar Gul 3/28 (4 overs)		Misbah-ul-Haq 43 (38); Irfan Pathan 3/16 (4 overs)

India won by 5 runs
Wanderers Stadium, Johannesburg
Umpires: Mark Benson (Eng) and Simon Taufel (Aus)
Player of the match: Irfan Pathan (Ind)

- India won the toss and elected to bat.
- Yusuf Pathan (Ind) made his T20I debut.

=== Scorecard ===
1st innings

India batting
Player	Status	Runs	Balls	4s	6s	Strike rate
Gautam Gambhir	c Asif b Gul	75	54	8	2	138.88
Yusuf Pathan	c Malik b Asif	15	8	1	1	187.50
Robin Uthappa	c Afridi b Tanvir	8	11	1	0	72.72
Yuvraj Singh	c & b Gul	14	19	1	0	73.68
Mahendra Singh Dhoni *†	b Gul	6	10	0	0	60.00
Rohit Sharma	not out	30	16	2	1	187.50
Irfan Pathan	not out	3	3	0	0	100.00
Harbhajan Singh	did not bat					
Joginder Sharma	did not bat					
S. Sreesanth	did not bat					
R. P. Singh	did not bat					
Extras	(lb 1; w 4; nb 1)	6				
Total	(5 wickets; 20 overs)	157		13	4	

Fall of wickets: 1/25 (YK Pathan, 2.4 ov), 2/40 (Uthappa, 5.4 ov), 3/103 (Yuvraj, 13.3 ov), 4/111 (Dhoni, 15.2 ov), 5/130 (Gambhir, 17.6 ov)

Pakistan bowling
Bowler	Overs	Maidens	Runs	Wickets	Econ	Wides	NBs
Mohammad Asif	3	0	25	1	8.33	1	0
Sohail Tanvir	4	0	29	1	7.25	2	0
Shahid Afridi	4	0	30	0	7.50	0	0
Mohammad Hafeez	3	0	25	0	8.33	0	0
Umar Gul	4	0	28	3	7.00	1	1
Yasir Arafat	2	0	19	0	9.50	0	0

2nd innings

Pakistan batting
Player	Status	Runs	Balls	4s	6s	Strike rate
Mohammad Hafeez	c Uthappa b RP Singh	1	3	0	0	33.33
Imran Nazir	run out (Uthappa)	33	14	4	2	235.71
Kamran Akmal †	b RP Singh	0	3	0	0	0.00
Younis Khan	c YK Pathan b Joginder	24	24	4	0	100.00
Shoaib Malik *	c Rohit b IK Pathan	8	17	0	0	47.05
Misbah-ul-Haq	c Sreesanth b Joginder	43	38	0	4	113.15
Shahid Afridi	c Sreesanth b IK Pathan	0	1	0	0	0.00
Yasir Arafat	b IK Pathan	15	11	2	0	136.36
Sohail Tanvir	b Sreesanth	12	4	0	2	300.00
Umar Gul	b RP Singh	0	2	0	0	0.00
Mohammad Asif	not out	4	1	1	0	400.00
Extras	(b 1; lb 4; w 6; nb 1)	12				
Total	(all out; 19.3 overs)	152		11	8	

Fall of wickets: 1/2 (Hafeez, 0.5 ov), 2/26 (Akmal, 2.3 ov), 3/53 (Nazir, 5.4 ov), 4/65 (Younis, 8.3 ov), 5/76 (Malik, 11.3 ov), 6/77 (Afridi, 11.4 ov), 7/104 (Arafat, 15.6 ov), 8/138 (Tanvir, 17.6 ov), 9/141 (Gul, 18.5 ov), 10/152 (Misbah, 19.3 ov)

India bowling
Bowler	Overs	Maidens	Runs	Wickets	Econ	Wides	NBs
R. P. Singh	4	0	26	3	6.50	0	1
S. Sreesanth	4	1	44	1	11.00	2	0
Joginder Sharma	3.3	0	20	2	5.71	2	0
Yusuf Pathan	1	0	5	0	5.00	0	0
Irfan Pathan	4	0	16	3	4.00	1	0
Harbhajan Singh	3	0	36	0	12.00	1	0

Key

- * – Captain
- † – Wicket-keeper
- c Fielder – Indicates that the batsman was dismissed by a catch by the named fielder
- b Bowler – Indicates which bowler gains credit for the dismissal

== Aftermath ==
After the match, Indian captain MS Dhoni remarked that "Twenty20 will be huge in India." Pakistan captain Shoaib Malik blamed "luck" and apologized to "Muslims all over the world" for the defeat, drawing sharp criticism from Muslim leaders and sportspeople in India.

On 26 September, the Indian team was greeted with a warm welcome by the fans upon their return to India. The players took a 30-kilometre open bus ride from the Mumbai Airport to the Wankhede Stadium, where they were felicitated by the Board of Control for Cricket in India (BCCI). The players were rewarded ₹80 lakh (US$193,477.39) each, while Yuvraj Singh was gifted an additional ₹1 crore (US$241,846.74) and a Porsche 911.

In Pakistan, the loss was met with agitation by several fans who formed mobs, raised slogans and burned effigies of the players. In Lahore, effigies of Shahid Afridi and Younis Khan were burned at the football stadium which was hosting the 2007 AFC President's Cup.

== See also ==
- 2011 Cricket World Cup
- 2017 ICC Champions Trophy Final
