= Radio Shadhin =

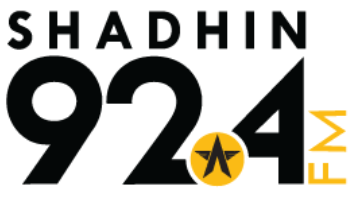

Dhaka; Bangladesh
- Broadcast area: Bangladesh (Frequency modulation)
- Frequency: 92.4 MHz

Programming
- Language: Bangla

History
- First air date: 20 March 2013

Links
- Website: radioshadhin.fm

Radio Shadhin is a Bangladeshi FM radio station, headquartered in Dhaka. It started broadcasting on 20 March 2013. It broadcasts all home matches of the Bangladesh National Cricket Team.
