= 2026 Men's T20 World Cup =

International cricket tournament

2026 ICC Men's T20 World Cup
- Tournament logo
- Dates: 7 February – 8 March 2026
- Administrator: International Cricket Council
- Cricket format: Twenty20 International
- Tournament format(s): Group stage, Super 8 stage and knockout stage
- Hosts: India; Sri Lanka
- Champions: India (3rd title)
- Runners-up: New Zealand
- Participants: 20
- Matches: 55
- Player of the series: (India) Sanju Samson
- Most runs: (Pakistan) Sahibzada Farhan (383)
- Most wickets: (India) Jasprit Bumrah (14) (India) Varun Chakravarthy (14)
- Official website: icc-cricket.com

The 2026 ICC Men's T20 World Cup was the tenth edition of the ICC Men's T20 World Cup, co-hosted by Board of Control for Cricket in India and Sri Lanka Cricket from 7 February to 8 March 2026. Sri Lanka had previously hosted the competition in 2012 and India in 2016. A total of twenty teams competed in 55 matches across five venues in India and three in Sri Lanka. More than 1.3 million spectators attended the matches across the two nations.

Twenty teams competed in the tournament, which included the teams from the two hosts, six of the top seven teams from the previous edition, the four highest-ranked teams in the ICC Men's T20I Team Rankings not already qualified, and eight other teams determined through a series of regional qualifiers. Italy qualified for the Men's T20 World Cup for the first time.

India were the defending champions, having won the 2024 edition. They defended their title by defeating New Zealand by 96 runs in the final, becoming the first team to win two consecutive T20 World Cups, the first country to win the title at home, and the first team to win the tournament three times.

== Background ==
The ICC Men's T20 World Cup is a biennial world cup for cricket in Twenty20 International (T20I) format, organised by the International Cricket Council (ICC). It was first played in 2007 in South Africa, and the 2026 tournament marked its tenth edition. The ninth edition, held in 2024 in the West Indies and the United States, was contested by 20 teams, and was won by India, who defeated South Africa in the final.

=== Host selection ===
In November 2021, as part of the 2024–2031 ICC men's hosts cycle, the ICC announced that the 2026 Men's T20 World Cup would be played in India and Sri Lanka. Initially Sri Lanka Cricket proposed to host the entire tournament, however, due to expansion of the tournament to 20 teams from the previous edition and lack of cricket stadiums in Sri Lanka, it was decided to be co-hosted with the Board of Control for Cricket in India (BCCI). Sri Lanka had previously hosted the competition in 2012 and India in 2016.

=== Format ===
The tournament's format remained the same as the previous edition. The 20 qualifying teams were divided into four groups of five each. In the group stage, each team played each of the other teams in the group once in a round-robin format, and the top two teams in each group advanced to the Super 8 stage, where the teams were placed into two groups of four teams each. Prior to the tournament, the ICC had announced the eight seeded teams based on the ICC T20I rankings, who were placed in predetermined positions in the Super 8 stage, irrespective of their position in the group stage. If an unseeded team qualified at the expense of a seeded team, it took the position of the corresponding seeded team that failed to qualify from their group. In the Super 8 stage, each team played against each of the other teams in the group once. The top two teams from each group advanced to the knockout stage, which consisted of two semi-finals, the winners of which faced off in the final. No points were carried over between stages.

=== Schedule ===
In the 2023–2027 ICC Men's Future Tours Programme, the tournament was scheduled to be held in February–March 2026. The ICC announced the final schedule on 25 November 2025, with the tournament scheduled to take place from 7 February to 8 March 2026. The teams will play 55 matches across five venues in India and three venues in Sri Lanka. On 26 January 2026, the ICC announced that warm-up matches would be held from 2 to 6 February.

=== Prize money ===
The ICC allocated a pool of $11.25 million in prize money for the tournament. The prize for winning was $2.45 million, with each team receiving an additional $31,154 for each match they won, excluding the semi-finals and final.

Prize money allocation for the tournament
| Place | Teams | Amount | |
| Place | Teams | per side | Total |
|---|---|---|---|
| Champions | 1 | $2.45 million | $2.45 million |
| Runners-up | 1 | $1.28 million | $1.28 million |
| Semi-finalists | 2 | $787,500 | $1.575 million |
| 5th–8th place (Super 8) | 4 | $382,500 | $1.53 million |
| 9th–12th place (Group stage) | 4 | $247,500 | $0.99 million |
| 13th–20th place (Group stage) | 8 | $225,000 | $1.8 million |
| Match winners | 52 | $31,154 | $1.62 million |
| Total | 20 | $11.25 million | |

=== Marketing ===
External videos
- "Feel the Thrill" on YouTube
- "Feel the Thrill (Tamil Sinhalese version)" on YouTube

In November 2025, former Indian captain Rohit Sharma was named as an ambassador for the tournament. The official theme song for the tournament, "Feel the Thrill", produced and performed by Anirudh Ravichander with lyrics by Heisenberg and Raqueeb Alam, was released on 30 January 2026. A remix version featuring Sri Lankan artist Dinesh Gamage, sub-titled "Tamil Sinhalese version", which replaced Hindi verses with Tamil and Sinhala verses, was released on 7 February. A promotional event, the "Captains' Carnival", featuring all the team captains and social media influencers, was held on 5 February in Mumbai and Colombo. On 6 February, the ICC announced that an opening ceremony would be held at the Wankhede Stadium ahead of the third match of the opening day between India and the United States. Badshah, Nora Fatehi, Rishab Sharma, and Sivamani performed at the opening ceremony.

== Qualification ==
The hosts, India and Sri Lanka, along with the top seven teams from the 2024 tournament: Afghanistan, Australia, Bangladesh, England, South Africa, the United States, and the West Indies; directly qualified for the 2026 tournament. The remaining three direct qualification places were allocated to the next best-ranked teams in the ICC Men's T20I Team Rankings as on 30 June 2024, that had not finished in the top seven: Ireland, New Zealand, and Pakistan. The eight remaining places were filled through the ICC's regional qualifiers, consisting of two teams each from Africa and Europe regions, three teams combined from Asia and East Asia-Pacific and one team from the Americas. In June 2025, Canada qualified for the World Cup from the Americas region, followed by Italy and Netherlands from the Europe region in July. In October 2025, Namibia and Zimbabwe qualified from the Africa region, followed by Nepal, Oman, and United Arab Emirates from the combined Asia-EAP qualifier. Italy qualified for the men's T20 World Cup for the first time. Ahead of the 2026 tournament, Bangladesh withdrew from the tournament, and they were replaced by the next highest ranked T20I team: Scotland.

Highlighted are the countries that participated in the 2026 Men's T20 World Cup qualification pathway. Qualified directly (hosts, top 6 from the previous tournament, or via T20I Rankings) Qualified via the regional qualifiers Participated in the regional qualifiers but failed to qualify Withdrew or suspended

Teams qualified for the tournament
| Method of qualification | No. of teams | Teams | T20I ranking (Note: The ICC Men's T20I Team Rankings as on 1 February 2026, before the start of the tournament.) |
|---|---|---|---|
| Hosts | 2 | India | 1 |
| Hosts | 2 | Sri Lanka | 8 |
| 2024 Men's T20 World Cup (Top teams from the previous tournament, excluding hosts) | 6 (7) | Afghanistan | 10 |
| 2024 Men's T20 World Cup (Top teams from the previous tournament, excluding hosts) | 6 (7) | Australia | 2 |
| 2024 Men's T20 World Cup (Top teams from the previous tournament, excluding hosts) | 6 (7) | ~~Bangladesh~~ (Note: Following the Bangladesh Cricket Board's refusal to play in India, Bangladesh were replaced by Scotland, the next highest ranked T20I team.) | 9 |
| 2024 Men's T20 World Cup (Top teams from the previous tournament, excluding hosts) | 6 (7) | England | 3 |
| 2024 Men's T20 World Cup (Top teams from the previous tournament, excluding hosts) | 6 (7) | South Africa | 5 |
| 2024 Men's T20 World Cup (Top teams from the previous tournament, excluding hosts) | 6 (7) | United States | 18 |
| 2024 Men's T20 World Cup (Top teams from the previous tournament, excluding hosts) | 6 (7) | West Indies | 7 |
| ICC Men's T20I Team Rankings | 4 (3) | Ireland | 12 |
| ICC Men's T20I Team Rankings | 4 (3) | New Zealand | 4 |
| ICC Men's T20I Team Rankings | 4 (3) | Pakistan | 6 |
| ICC Men's T20I Team Rankings | 4 (3) | Scotland | 14 |
| Americas Qualifier | 1 | Canada | 19 |
| Europe Qualifier | 2 | Italy | 26 |
| Europe Qualifier | 2 | Netherlands | 13 |
| Africa Qualifier | 2 | Namibia | 15 |
| Africa Qualifier | 2 | Zimbabwe | 11 |
| Asia–EAP Qualifier | 3 | Nepal | 16 |
| Asia–EAP Qualifier | 3 | Oman | 20 |
| Asia–EAP Qualifier | 3 | United Arab Emirates | 17 |
| Total | 20 | | |

== Venues ==
On 6 November 2025, the ICC announced the finalised venues for the World Cup, five in India: Narendra Modi Stadium in Ahmedabad, M. A. Chidambaram Stadium in Chennai, Arun Jaitley Stadium in Delhi, Eden Gardens in Kolkata and Wankhede Stadium in Mumbai; and three in Sri Lanka: R. Premadasa Stadium and Sinhalese Sports Club Cricket Ground in Colombo and Pallekele Cricket Stadium in Kandy.

Venues in India
A map of India with pin-points on 2026 Men's T20 World Cup venues
| Ahmedabad | Chennai | Delhi |
| Narendra Modi Stadium | M. A. Chidambaram Stadium | Arun Jaitley Cricket Stadium |
| Capacity: 132,000 | Capacity: 39,000 | Capacity: 55,000 |
| Matches: 7 (Final) | Matches: 7 | Matches: 6 |
| Narendra Modi Stadium in 2023 | M. A. Chidambaram Stadium in 2023 | Arun Jaitley Stadium in 2023 |
| Kolkata | Mumbai | |
| Eden Gardens | Wankhede Stadium | |
| Capacity: 68,000 | Capacity: 33,108 | |
| Matches: 7 (Semi-final 1) | Matches: 8 (Semi-final 2) | |
| Eden Gardens in 2017 | Wankhede Stadium in 2011 | |

Venues in Sri Lanka
A map of Sri Lanka with pin-points on 2026 Men's T20 World Cup venues
| Colombo | | Kandy |
| R. Premadasa Stadium | Sinhalese Sports Club Cricket Ground | Pallekele International Cricket Stadium |
| Capacity: 35,000 | Capacity: 10,000 | Capacity: 35,000 |
| Matches: 8 | Matches: 5 | Matches: 7 |
| R. Premadasa Stadium in 2014 | SSC Cricket Ground in 2001 | Pallekele Cricket Stadium in 2012 |

== Squads ==
Each team was allowed a maximum squad size of 15 players and was required to submit the provisional squad to the ICC by 8 January 2026. The teams were allowed to make changes to the squads until 31 January 2026. Any changes after this required permission from the ICC's technical committee.

== Match officials ==
On 30 January 2026, the ICC released the list of match referees and umpires for the tournament.

Match referees

- (England) Dean Cosker
- (Australia) Dave Gilbert
- (Sri Lanka) Ranjan Madugalle
- (Zimbabwe) Andy Pycroft
- (Cricket West Indies) Richie Richardson
- (India) Javagal Srinath

Umpires

- (Ireland) Roland Black
- (New Zealand) Chris Brown
- (Sri Lanka) Kumar Dharmasena
- (New Zealand) Chris Gaffaney
- (South Africa) Adrian Holdstock
- (England) Richard Illingworth
- (England) Richard Kettleborough
- (New Zealand) Wayne Knights
- (Australia) Donovan Koch
- (India) Jayaraman Madanagopal
- (India) Nitin Menon
- (Australia) Sam Nogajski
- (India) K. N. Ananthapadmanabhan
- (South Africa) Allahudien Paleker
- (Pakistan) Ahsan Raza
- (Cricket West Indies) Leslie Reifer
- (Australia) Paul Reiffel
- (Zimbabwe) Langton Rusere
- (Bangladesh) Sharfuddoula
- (Bangladesh) Gazi Sohel
- (Australia) Rod Tucker
- (England) Alex Wharf
- (Sri Lanka) Raveendra Wimalasiri
- (Pakistan) Asif Yaqoob

== Warm-up matches ==
A total of 16 warm-up matches were played from 2 to 6 February, involving 18 teams participating in the World Cup in addition to the India A and Sri Lanka A teams. The warm-up matches were held at four venues in India: BCCI Centre of Excellence Grounds 1 & 2 in Bengaluru, M. A. Chidambaram Stadium in Chennai, and DY Patil Stadium in Navi Mumbai; and three in Sri Lanka: Colombo Cricket Club Ground, R. Premadasa Stadium and SSC Cricket Ground in Colombo. Sri Lanka and England played a three-match T20I series from 30 January to 3 February at the Pallekele Cricket Stadium in Kandy as preparation for the World Cup.

Warm-up match 1
2 February 2026
15:00 +05:30 (D/N)
Scorecard

| Afghanistan; 184/6 (20 overs) | v | Scotland; 123 (19.3 overs) |
| Darwish Rasooli 84 (46); Mark Watt 2/32 (4 overs) | | Matthew Cross 21 (25); Azmatullah Omarzai 3/14 (3 overs) |

Afghanistan won by 61 runs
BCCI Centre of Excellence Ground 1, Bengaluru
Umpires: Abhijeet Bengeri (Ind) and P Jayapal (Ind)
Player of the match: Darwish Rasooli (Afg)

- Afghanistan won the toss and elected to bat.

Warm-up match 2
2 February 2026
17:00 +05:30 (D/N)
Scorecard

| India A 238/3 (20 overs) | v | United States; 200 (19.4 overs) |
| Narayan Jagadeesan 104 (55); Shubham Ranjane 1/12 (2 overs) | | Andries Gous 44 (31); Ravi Bishnoi 3/37 (4 overs) |

India A won by 38 runs
DY Patil Stadium, Navi Mumbai
Umpires: Rohan Pandit (Ind) and Vinod Seshan (Ind)
Player of the match: Narayan Jagadeesan (Ind)

- United States won the toss and elected to field.

Warm-up match 3
2 February 2026
19:00 +05:30 (N)
Scorecard

| Italy; 156/4 (20 overs) | v | Canada; 146/6 (20 overs) |
| JJ Smuts 49 (37); Dilpreet Bajwa 1/24 (3 overs) | | Dilpreet Bajwa 37 (34); Grant Stewart 1/18 (3 overs) |

Italy won by 10 runs
M. A. Chidambaram Stadium, Chennai
Umpires: Saidharshan Kumar (Ind) and Madanagopal Kuppuraj (Ind)
Player of the match: JJ Smuts (Ita)

- Canada won the toss and elected to field.

Warm-up match 4
3 February 2026
13:00 +05:30
Scorecard

| Sri Lanka A 145/9 (20 overs) | v | Oman; 146/5 (18 overs) |
| Wanuja Sahan 29 (21); Jay Odedra 2/18 (3 overs) | | Aamir Kaleem 80 (47); Wanuja Sahan 3/16 (4 overs) |

Oman won by 5 wickets
Colombo Cricket Club Ground, Colombo
Umpires: Chandrika Amarasinghe (SL) and Deepal Gunawardene (SL)

- Sri Lanka A won the toss and elected to bat.

Warm-up match 5
3 February 2026
15:00 +05:30 (D/N)
Scorecard

| Zimbabwe; 178/9 (20 overs) | v | Netherlands; 149 (20 overs) |
| Ryan Burl 50* (31); Logan van Beek 3/22 (3 overs) | | Logan van Beek 40* (31); Richard Ngarava 3/11 (3 overs) |

Zimbabwe won by 29 runs
R. Premadasa Stadium, Colombo
Umpires: Asanka Nanayakkara (SL) and Shantha Fonseka (SL)
Player of the match: Logan van Beek (Ned)

- Zimbabwe won the toss and elected to bat.

Warm-up match 6
3 February 2026
17:00 +05:30 (D/N)
Scorecard

| United Arab Emirates; 145/6 (20 overs) | v | Nepal; 148/3 (17 overs) |
| Sohaib Khan 38* (27); Sandeep Lamichhane 2/24 (4 overs) | | Aarif Sheikh 61* (37); Muhammad Rohid 1/13 (3 overs) |

Nepal won by 7 wickets
M. A. Chidambaram Stadium, Chennai
Umpires: Madanagopal Kuppuraj (Ind) and Saidharshan Kumar (Ind)

- Nepal won the toss and elected to field.

Warm-up match 7
4 February 2026
13:00 +05:30
Scorecard

| Namibia; 226/4 (20 overs) | v | Scotland; 220/5 (20 overs) |
| Jan Frylinck 88 (44); Mark Watt 1/19 (3 overs) | | Brandon McMullen 95 (39); Max Heingo 2/44 (4 overs) |

Namibia won by 6 runs
BCCI Centre of Excellence Ground 2, Bengaluru
Umpires: KN Ananthapadmanabhan (Ind) and Donovan Koch (Aus)

- Namibia won the toss and elected to bat.

Warm-up match 8
4 February 2026
15:00 +05:30 (D/N)
Scorecard

| Afghanistan; 182/6 (20 overs) | v | West Indies; 159/7 (20 overs) |
| Ibrahim Zadran 51 (34); Roston Chase 1/18 (3 overs) | | Matthew Forde 52* (26); Mujeeb Ur Rahman 2/19 (3 overs) |

Afghanistan won by 23 runs
BCCI Centre of Excellence Ground 1, Bengaluru
Umpires: Jayaraman Madanagopal (Ind) and Sam Nogajski (Aus)

- West Indies won the toss and elected to field.

Warm-up match 9
4 February 2026
17:00 +05:30 (D/N)
Scorecard

| Ireland | v | Pakistan |

Match abandoned
SSC Cricket Ground, Colombo
Umpires: Raveendra Wimalasiri (SL) and Asif Yaqoob (Pak)

- No toss.
- No play was possible due to rain.

Warm-up match 10
4 February 2026
19:00 +05:30 (N)
Scorecard

| India; 240/5 (20 overs) | v | South Africa; 210/7 (20 overs) |
| Ishan Kishan 53 (20); Marco Jansen 1/18 (2 overs) | | Tristan Stubbs 45* (21); Abhishek Sharma 2/32 (3 overs) |

India won by 30 runs
DY Patil Stadium, Navi Mumbai
Umpires: Sharfuddoula (Ban) and Leslie Reifer (WI)

- India won the toss and elected to bat.

Warm-up match 11
5 February 2026
11:00 +05:30
Scorecard

| Zimbabwe; 187/7 (20 overs) | v | Oman; 188/6 (19.2 overs) |
| Brian Bennett 56 (28); Sufyan Mehmood 3/22 (4 overs) | | Jatinder Singh 55 (33); Blessing Muzarabani 2/41 (4 overs) |

Oman won by 4 wickets
Colombo Cricket Club Ground, Colombo
Umpires: Wayne Knights (NZ) and Ahsan Raza (Pak)

- Oman won the toss and elected to field.

Warm-up match 12
5 February 2026
13:00 +05:30
Scorecard

| Canada; 161/6 (20 overs) | v | Nepal; 162/4 (18 overs) |
| Navneet Dhaliwal 41 (36); Sandeep Lamichhane 2/14 (4 overs) | | Aasif Sheikh 58 (29); Ajayveer Hundal 1/14 (2 overs) |

Nepal won by 6 wickets
M. A. Chidambaram Stadium, Chennai
Umpires: Adrian Holdstock (SA) and Gazi Sohel (Ban)

- Canada won the toss and elected to bat.

Warm-up match 13
5 February 2026
17:00 +05:30 (D/N)
Scorecard

| Australia | v | Netherlands |

No result
R. Premadasa Stadium, Colombo
Umpires: Chris Gaffaney (NZ) and Richard Illingworth (Eng)

- Australia won the toss and elected to bat.
- No play was possible due to rain.

Warm-up match 14
5 February 2026
19:00 +05:30 (N)
Scorecard

| New Zealand; 208/7 (20 overs) | v | United States; 201/8 (20 overs) |
| Tim Seifert 66 (31); Saurabh Netravalkar 2/37 (4 overs) | | Saiteja Mukkamalla 50 (31); Matt Henry 5/32 (4 overs) |

New Zealand won by 7 runs
DY Patil Stadium, Navi Mumbai
Umpires: Roland Black (Ire) and Paul Reiffel (Aus)

- United States won the toss and elected to field.

Warm-up match 15
6 February 2026
15:00 +05:30 (D/N)
Scorecard

| Italy; 193/7 (20 overs) | v | United Arab Emirates; 81 (18.2 overs) |
| Anthony Mosca 56 (22); Junaid Siddique 3/32 (4 overs) | | Muhammad Farooq 23 (25); Grant Stewart 3/7 (2 overs) |

Italy won by 112 runs
M. A. Chidambaram Stadium, Chennai
Umpires: Langton Rusere (Zim) and Alex Wharf (Eng)

- United Arab Emirates won the toss and elected to field.

Warm-up match 16
6 February 2026
17:00 +05:30 (D/N)
Scorecard

| India A 197/8 (20 overs) | v | Namibia; 67 (12.1 overs) |
| Riyan Parag 69 (39); Gerhard Erasmus 2/2 (1 over) | | Dylan Leicher 22 (20); Gurjapneet Singh 2/6 (2 overs) |

India A won by 130 runs
BCCI Centre of Excellence Ground 1, Bengaluru
Umpires: Chris Brown (NZ) and Donovan Koch (Aus)

- India A won the toss and elected to bat.

== Group stage ==
The ICC announced the groups and fixtures on 25 November 2025, with group stage played from 7 to 20 February. The 20 teams were divided into four groups of five with each team facing the other teams in the group. The group stage featured a total of 40 matches. The opening match was played between Netherlands and Pakistan at the SSC Cricket Ground on 7 February. The following table lists teams in order of their initial group stage seedings.

| Group A | Group B | Group C | Group D |
|---|---|---|---|
| India; Pakistan; United States; Netherlands; Namibia | Australia; Sri Lanka; Ireland; Zimbabwe; Oman | England; West Indies; Nepal; Italy; Scotland | New Zealand; South Africa; Afghanistan; Canada; United Arab Emirates |

=== Group A ===
Group A standings
| Pos | Team | Pld | W | L | NR | Pts | NRR | Qualification |
|---|---|---|---|---|---|---|---|---|
| 1 | India (H) | 4 | 4 | 0 | 0 | 8 | 2.500 | Advanced to the Super 8 stage |
| 2 | Pakistan | 4 | 3 | 1 | 0 | 6 | 0.976 | Advanced to the Super 8 stage |
| 3 | United States | 4 | 2 | 2 | 0 | 4 | 0.788 | Eliminated |
| 4 | Netherlands | 4 | 1 | 3 | 0 | 2 | −1.217 | Eliminated |
| 5 | Namibia | 4 | 0 | 4 | 0 | 0 | −3.108 | Eliminated |

Source: ESPNcricinfo
Rules for classification: 1) Points; 2) Wins; 3) Net run rate; 4) Results of games between tied teams; 5) T20I Rankings ahead of the tournament
(H) Hosts

Match 1
7 February 2026
11:00 UTC+5:30
Scorecard

| Netherlands; 147 (19.5 overs) | v | Pakistan; 148/7 (19.3 overs) |
| Scott Edwards 37 (29); Salman Mirza 3/24 (3.5 overs) | | Sahibzada Farhan 47 (31); Paul van Meekeren 2/20 (4 overs) |

Pakistan won by 3 wickets
Sinhalese Sports Club Cricket Ground, Colombo
Attendance: 5,000
Umpires: Kumar Dharmasena (SL) and Wayne Knights (NZ)
Player of the match: Faheem Ashraf (Pak)

- Pakistan won the toss and elected to field.

Match 3
7 February 2026
19:00 UTC+5:30 (N)
Scorecard

| India; 161/9 (20 overs) | v | United States; 132/8 (20 overs) |
| Suryakumar Yadav 84* (49); Shadley van Schalkwyk 4/25 (4 overs) | | Shubham Ranjane 37 (22); Mohammed Siraj 3/29 (4 overs) |

India won by 29 runs
Wankhede Stadium, Mumbai
Attendance: 28,726
Umpires: Paul Reiffel (Aus) and Rod Tucker (Aus)
Player of the match: Suryakumar Yadav (Ind)

- United States won the toss and elected to field.
- Mohammad Mohsin and Shubham Ranjane (USA) both made their T20I debuts.
- Saurabh Netravalkar (USA) surpassed Sanath Jayasuriya's record for conceding the most runs in a T20 World Cup innings (0–65).
- This was India's ninth consecutive win in the T20 World Cup, the longest winning streak in the tournament.
- Suryakumar Yadav (Ind) surpassed Virat Kohli's record for the most player of the match awards by an Indian in T20Is (17).

Match 10
10 February 2026
11:00 UTC+5:30
Scorecard

| Namibia; 156/8 (20 overs) | v | Netherlands; 159/3 (18 overs) |
| Jan Nicol Loftie-Eaton 42 (38); Logan van Beek 2/13 (3 overs) | | Bas de Leede 72* (48); Bernard Scholtz 1/27 (4 overs) |

Netherlands won by 7 wickets
Arun Jaitley Cricket Stadium, New Delhi
Umpires: Adrian Holdstock (SA) and Langton Rusere (Zim)
Player of the match: Bas de Leede (Ned)

- Netherlands won the toss and elected to field.
- Willem Myburgh (Nam) made his T20I debut.
- This was Namibia's maiden international game in India.
- Ruben Trumpelmann (Nam) took his 50th wicket in T20Is.

Match 12
10 February 2026
19:00 UTC+5:30 (N)
Scorecard

| Pakistan; 190/9 (20 overs) | v | United States; 158/8 (20 overs) |
| Sahibzada Farhan 73 (41); Shadley van Schalkwyk 4/25 (4 overs) | | Shubham Ranjane 51 (30); Usman Tariq 3/27 (4 overs) |

Pakistan won by 32 runs
Sinhalese Sports Club Cricket Ground, Colombo
Umpires: Richard Illingworth (Eng) and Raveendra Wimalasiri (SL)
Player of the match: Sahibzada Farhan (Pak)

- United States won the toss and elected to field.
- Ehsan Adil (USA) made his T20I debut.
- Shaheen Afridi (Pak) played in his 100th T20I match.
- Sahibzada Farhan (Pak) scored his 1,000th run in T20Is.

Match 18
12 February 2026
19:00 UTC+5:30 (N)
Scorecard

| India; 209/9 (20 overs) | v | Namibia; 116 (18.2 overs) |
| Ishan Kishan 61 (24); Gerhard Erasmus 4/20 (4 overs) | | Louren Steenkamp 29 (20); Varun Chakravarthy 3/7 (2 overs) |

India won by 93 runs
Arun Jaitley Cricket Stadium, New Delhi
Umpires: Paul Reiffel (Aus) and Rod Tucker (Aus)
Player of the match: Hardik Pandya (Ind)

- Namibia won the toss and elected to field.
- Ishan Kishan became the first Indian wicketkeeper to score half-century in the T20 World Cup.
- India's extended their record winning-streak in the T20 World Cup to ten consecutive wins.
- This was India's largest winning margin in a T20 World Cup match, surpassing their previous winning margin of 90 runs against England in 2012.

Match 21
13 February 2026
19:00 UTC+5:30 (N)
Scorecard

| United States; 196/6 (20 overs) | v | Netherlands; 103 (15.5 overs) |
| Saiteja Mukkamalla 79 (51); Bas de Leede 3/37 (4 overs) | | Bas de Leede 23 (17); Harmeet Singh Baddhan 4/21 (4 overs) |

United States won by 93 runs
M. A. Chidambaram Stadium, Chennai
Attendance: 18,955
Umpires: K. N. Ananthapadmanabhan (Ind) and Nitin Menon (Ind)
Player of the match: Harmeet Singh Baddhan (USA)

- Netherlands won the toss and elected to field.
- This was the largest winning margin in a T20 World Cup match by an associate nation.

Match 26
15 February 2026
15:00 UTC+5:30 (D/N)
Scorecard

| United States; 199/4 (20 overs) | v | Namibia; 168/6 (20 overs) |
| Sanjay Krishnamurthi 68* (33); Willem Myburgh 2/22 (4 overs) | | Louren Steenkamp 58 (39); Shadley van Schalkwyk 2/30 (4 overs) |

United States won by 31 runs
M. A. Chidambaram Stadium, Chennai
Umpires: K. N. Ananthapadmanabhan (Ind) and Sharfuddoula (Ban)
Player of the match: Sanjay Krishnamurthi (USA)

- United States won the toss and elected to bat.
- Monank Patel (USA) became the first player for the United States to score 1000 runs in T20Is.
- Zane Green (Nam) became the first player to be retired out in the 2026 tournament and second overall in the T20 World Cup history.
- Namibia were eliminated as a result of this match.

Match 27
15 February 2026
19:00 UTC+5:30 (N)
Scorecard

| India; 175/7 (20 overs) | v | Pakistan; 114 (18 overs) |
| Ishan Kishan 77 (40); Saim Ayub 3/25 (4 overs) | | Usman Khan 44 (34); Hardik Pandya 2/16 (3 overs) |

India won by 61 runs
R. Premadasa Stadium, Colombo
Umpires: Kumar Dharmasena (SL) and Richard Illingworth (Eng)
Player of the match: Ishan Kishan (Ind)

- Pakistan won the toss and elected to field.
- This was India's highest total against Pakistan in the T20 World Cup history.
- This was India's biggest win (by runs) against Pakistan in T20Is.
- India's extended their record winning-streak in T20 World Cup to eleven consecutive wins.
- This was India's sixteenth consecutive win in ICC limited-overs tournaments, the longest winning streak by any team.
- India qualified for the Super 8 as a result of this match.

Match 35
18 February 2026
15:00 UTC+5:30 (D/N)
Scorecard

| Pakistan; 199/3 (20 overs) | v | Namibia; 97 (17.3 overs) |
| Sahibzada Farhan 100* (58); Jack Brassell 2/48 (4 overs) | | Louren Steenkamp 23 (22); Usman Tariq 4/16 (3.3 overs) |

Pakistan won by 102 runs
Sinhalese Sports Club Cricket Ground, Colombo
Umpires: Chris Gaffaney (NZ) and Richard Illingworth (Eng)
Player of the match: Sahibzada Farhan (Pak)

- Pakistan won the toss and elected to bat.
- Sahibzada Farhan (Pak) scored his maiden century in T20Is. This was the third century in the 2026 tournament and 14th overall in the T20 World Cup history.
- This was Pakistan's largest winning margin in a T20 World Cup match, surpassing their previous winning margin of 82 runs against Netherlands in 2009.
- Pakistan qualified for the Super 8 while Netherlands and United States were eliminated as a result of this match.

Match 36
18 February 2026
19:00 UTC+5:30 (N)
Scorecard

| India; 193/6 (20 overs) | v | Netherlands; 176/7 (20 overs) |
| Shivam Dube 66 (31); Logan van Beek 3/56 (4 overs) | | Bas de Leede 33 (23); Varun Chakravarthy 3/14 (3 overs) |

India won by 17 runs
Narendra Modi Stadium, Ahmedabad
Attendance: 70,000
Umpires: Sam Nogajski (Aus) and Allahuddien Paleker (SA)
Player of the match: Shivam Dube (Ind)

- India won the toss and elected to bat.
- India extended their record winning-streaks in T20 World Cups to 12 consecutive matches, and 17 in ICC limited-overs tournaments.

=== Group B ===
Group B standings
| Pos | Team | Pld | W | L | NR | Pts | NRR | Qualification |
|---|---|---|---|---|---|---|---|---|
| 1 | Zimbabwe | 4 | 3 | 0 | 1 | 7 | 1.506 | Advanced to the Super 8 stage |
| 2 | Sri Lanka (H) | 4 | 3 | 1 | 0 | 6 | 1.741 | Advanced to the Super 8 stage |
| 3 | Australia | 4 | 2 | 2 | 0 | 4 | 1.523 | Eliminated |
| 4 | Ireland | 4 | 1 | 2 | 1 | 3 | 0.150 | Eliminated |
| 5 | Oman | 4 | 0 | 4 | 0 | 0 | −4.845 | Eliminated |

Source: ESPNcricinfo
Rules for classification: 1) Points; 2) Wins; 3) Net run rate; 4) Results of games between tied teams; 5) T20I Rankings ahead of the tournament
(H) Hosts

Match 6
8 February 2026
19:00 UTC+5:30 (N)
Scorecard

| Sri Lanka; 163/6 (20 overs) | v | Ireland; 143 (19.5 overs) |
| Kusal Mendis 56* (43); George Dockrell 2/17 (4 overs) | | Harry Tector 40 (34); Maheesh Theekshana 3/23 (4 overs) |

Sri Lanka won by 20 runs
R. Premadasa Stadium, Colombo
Attendance: 23,429
Umpires: Ahsan Raza (Pak) and Asif Yaqoob (Pak)
Player of the match: Kamindu Mendis (SL)

- Ireland won the toss and elected to field.

Match 8
9 February 2026
15:00 UTC+5:30 (D/N)
Scorecard

| Oman; 103 (19.5 overs) | v | Zimbabwe; 106/2 (13.3 overs) |
| Vinayak Shukla 28 (21); Blessing Muzarabani 3/16 (4 overs) | | Brian Bennett 48* (36); Sufyan Mehmood 2/12 (3 overs) |

Zimbabwe won by 8 wickets
Sinhalese Sports Club Cricket Ground, Colombo
Umpires: Wayne Knights (NZ) and Asif Yaqoob (Pak)
Player of the match: Blessing Muzarabani (Zim)

- Zimbabwe won the toss and elected to field.
- This was the first time Oman and Zimbabwe faced each other in T20Is.

Match 14
11 February 2026
15:00 UTC+5:30 (D/N)
Scorecard

| Australia; 182/6 (20 overs) | v | Ireland; 115 (16.5 overs) |
| Marcus Stoinis 45 (29); Mark Adair 2/44 (4 overs) | | George Dockrell 41 (29); Nathan Ellis 4/12 (3.5 overs) |

Australia won by 67 runs
R. Premadasa Stadium, Colombo
Umpires: Chris Gaffaney (NZ) and Richard Illingworth (Eng)
Player of the match: Nathan Ellis (Aus)

- Australia won the toss and elected to bat.

Match 16
12 February 2026
11:00 UTC+5:30
Scorecard

| Sri Lanka; 225/5 (20 overs) | v | Oman; 120/9 (20 overs) |
| Kusal Mendis 61 (45); Jiten Ramanandi 2/41 (4 overs) | | Mohammad Nadeem 53* (56); Maheesh Theekshana 2/11 (4 overs) |

Sri Lanka won by 105 runs
Pallekele International Cricket Stadium, Kandy
Umpires: Richard Kettleborough (Eng) and Wayne Knights (NZ)
Player of the match: Pavan Rathnayake (SL)

- Oman won the toss and elected to field.
- This was the first time Oman and Sri Lanka faced each other in T20Is.
- Dasun Shanaka scored the fastest half-century (19 balls) in T20Is for Sri Lanka and equalled with Rohit Sharma for the fastest half-century by a captain in the T20 World Cup.
- Mohammad Nadeem (Oma) became the oldest player (43 years and 161 days) to score a half-century in a Men's T20 World Cup.

Match 19
13 February 2026
11:00 UTC+5:30
Scorecard

| Zimbabwe; 169/2 (20 overs) | v | Australia; 146 (19.3 overs) |
| Brian Bennett 64* (56); Cameron Green 1/6 (1.1 overs) | | Matt Renshaw 65 (44); Blessing Muzarabani 4/17 (4 overs) |

Zimbabwe won by 23 runs
R. Premadasa Stadium, Colombo
Umpires: Chris Gaffaney (NZ) and Raveendra Wimalasiri (SL)
Player of the match: Blessing Muzarabani (Zim)

- Australia won the toss and elected to field.
- Blessing Muzarabani became the third player for Zimbabwe to take 100 wickets in T20Is.

Match 22
14 February 2026
11:00 UTC+5:30
Scorecard

| Ireland; 235/5 (20 overs) | v | Oman; 139 (18 overs) |
| Lorcan Tucker 94* (51); Shakeel Ahmed 3/33 (4 overs) | | Aamir Kaleem 50 (29); Josh Little 3/16 (4 overs) |

Ireland won by 96 runs
Sinhalese Sports Club Cricket Ground, Colombo
Umpires: Richard Kettleborough (Eng) and Raveendra Wimalasiri (SL)
Player of the match: Lorcan Tucker (Ire)

- Oman won the toss and elected to field.
- Aamir Kaleem (Oma) became the oldest player (44 years and 86 days) to score a half-century in a Men's T20 World Cup, surpassing Mohammad Nadeem.
- Oman were eliminated as a result of this match.

Match 30
16 February 2026
19:00 UTC+5:30 (N)
Scorecard

| Australia; 181 (20 overs) | v | Sri Lanka; 184/2 (18 overs) |
| Travis Head 56 (29); Dushan Hemantha 3/37 (4 overs) | | Pathum Nissanka 100* (52); Marcus Stoinis 2/46 (4 overs) |

Sri Lanka won by 8 wickets
Pallekele International Cricket Stadium, Kandy
Umpires: Richard Kettleborough (Eng) and Ahsan Raza (Pak)
Player of the match: Pathum Nissanka (SL)

- Sri Lanka won the toss and elected to field.
- Pathum Nissanka became the second player from Sri Lanka to score a century in T20 World Cup and the second Sri Lankan to score 2,500 T20I runs. This was the first century in the 2026 tournament and 12th overall in the T20 World Cup history.
- This was the highest successful run chase by Sri Lanka in T20 World Cups.
- Sri Lanka qualified for the Super 8 as a result of this match.

Match 32
17 February 2026
15:00 UTC+5:30 (D/N)
Scorecard

| Ireland | v | Zimbabwe |

Match abandoned
Pallekele International Cricket Stadium, Kandy
Umpires: Ahsan Raza (Pak) and Asif Yaqoob (Pak)

- No toss.
- No play was possible due to rain.
- Zimbabwe qualified for the Super 8 while Australia and Ireland were eliminated as a result of this match.

Match 38
19 February 2026
15:00 UTC+5:30 (D/N)
Scorecard

| Sri Lanka; 178/7 (20 overs) | v | Zimbabwe; 182/4 (19.3 overs) |
| Pathum Nissanka 62 (41); Graeme Cremer 2/27 (4 overs) | | Brian Bennett 63* (48); Dushan Hemantha 2/36 (4 overs) |

Zimbabwe won by 6 wickets
R. Premadasa Stadium, Colombo
Umpires: Richard Kettleborough (Eng) and Asif Yaqoob (Pak)
Player of the match: Sikandar Raza (Zim)

- Sri Lanka won the toss and elected to bat.

Match 40
20 February 2026
19:00 UTC+5:30 (N)
Scorecard

| Oman; 104 (16.2 overs) | v | Australia; 108/1 (9.4 overs) |
| Wasim Ali 32 (33); Adam Zampa 4/21 (3.2 overs) | | Mitchell Marsh 64* (33); Shakeel Ahmed 1/29 (4 overs) |

Australia won by 9 wickets
Pallekele International Cricket Stadium, Kandy
Umpires: Kumar Dharmasena (SL) and Chris Gaffaney (NZ)
Player of the match: Adam Zampa (Aus)

- Australia won the toss and elected to field.
- Glenn Maxwell (Aus) took his 50th wicket in T20Is. This was also the last T20I for Maxwell before his retirement from international cricket.

=== Group C ===
Group C standings
| Pos | Team | Pld | W | L | NR | Pts | NRR | Qualification |
|---|---|---|---|---|---|---|---|---|
| 1 | West Indies | 4 | 4 | 0 | 0 | 8 | 1.874 | Advanced to the Super 8 stage |
| 2 | England | 4 | 3 | 1 | 0 | 6 | 0.201 | Advanced to the Super 8 stage |
| 3 | Scotland | 4 | 1 | 3 | 0 | 2 | 0.184 | Eliminated |
| 4 | Italy | 4 | 1 | 3 | 0 | 2 | −1.020 | Eliminated |
| 5 | Nepal | 4 | 1 | 3 | 0 | 2 | −1.349 | Eliminated |

Source: ESPNcricinfo
Rules for classification: 1) Points; 2) Wins; 3) Net run rate; 4) Results of games between tied teams; 5) T20I Rankings ahead of the tournament

Match 2
7 February 2026
15:00 UTC+5:30 (D/N)
Scorecard

| West Indies; 182/5 (20 overs) | v | Scotland; 147 (18.5 overs) |
| Shimron Hetmyer 64 (36); Brad Currie 2/23 (4 overs) | | Richie Berrington 42 (24); Romario Shepherd 5/20 (3) |

West Indies won by 35 runs
Eden Gardens, Kolkata
Attendance: 15,080
Umpires: Nitin Menon (Ind) and Sam Nogajski (Aus)
Player of the match: Shimron Hetmyer (WI)

- Scotland won the toss and elected to field.
- Oliver Davidson (Sco) made his T20I debut.
- Tom Bruce played his first T20I for Scotland after having previously played 17 T20Is for New Zealand, becoming the 24th cricketer to represent two international teams in T20Is.
- Shimron Hetmyer (WI) broke Chris Gayle's record of the fastest half-century by a West Indies batter in the T20 World Cup (22 balls).
- Jason Holder (WI) became the first player for West Indies to take 100 wickets in T20Is.
- Romario Shepherd (WI) took his second hat-trick and maiden five-wicket haul in T20Is and the 13th overall in T20 World Cups. This was the first hat-trick in this edition and overall the tenth in the T20 World Cup.

Match 5
8 February 2026
15:00 UTC+5:30 (D/N)
Scorecard

| England; 184/7 (20 overs) | v | Nepal; 180/6 (20 overs) |
| Jacob Bethell 55 (35); Dipendra Singh Airee 2/23 (3 overs) | | Dipendra Singh Airee 44 (29); Liam Dawson 2/21 (4 overs) |

England won by 4 runs
Wankhede Stadium, Mumbai
Attendance: 19,369
Umpires: Leslie Reifer (WI) and Rod Tucker (Aus)
Player of the match: Will Jacks (Eng)

- England won the toss and elected to bat.
- This was the first time England and Nepal faced each other in T20Is.
- Sher Malla (Nep) made his T20I debut. He became the second Nepali player and the 30th player overall to take a wicket with his first ball in T20Is.
- Dipendra Singh Airee (Nep) became the first Nepali cricketer to score 2,000 runs in T20Is.
- This was Nepal's highest-ever innings total in the T20 World Cup (180).

Match 7
9 February 2026
11:00 UTC+5:30
Scorecard

| Scotland; 207/4 (20 overs) | v | Italy; 134 (16.4 overs) |
| George Munsey 84 (54); Ali Hasan 1/21 (4 overs) | | Ben Manenti 52 (31); Michael Leask 4/17 (4 overs) |

Scotland won by 73 runs
Eden Gardens, Kolkata
Umpires: Chris Brown (NZ) and Allahuddien Paleker (SA)
Player of the match: Michael Leask (Sco)

- Italy won the toss and elected to field.
- Italy made their T20 World Cup debut.
- This was Scotland's highest innings total in the T20 World Cup (207). This was also the highest score made by an associate nation in the tournament.

Match 15
11 February 2026
19:00 UTC+5:30 (N)
Scorecard

| West Indies; 196/6 (20 overs) | v | England; 166 (19 overs) |
| Sherfane Rutherford 76* (42); Adil Rashid 2/16 (4 overs) | | Sam Curran 43* (30); Gudakesh Motie 3/33 (4 overs) |

West Indies won by 30 runs
Wankhede Stadium, Mumbai
Attendance: 21,577
Umpires: Donovan Koch (Aus) and Allahuddien Paleker (SA)
Player of the match: Sherfane Rutherford (WI)

- England won the toss and elected to field.

Match 17
12 February 2026
15:00 UTC+5:30 (D/N)
Scorecard

| Nepal; 123 (19.3 overs) | v | Italy; 124/0 (12.4 overs) |
| Aarif Sheikh 27 (24); Crishan Kalugamage 3/18 (4 overs) | | Anthony Mosca 62* (32) |

Italy won by 10 wickets
Wankhede Stadium, Mumbai
Umpires: Donovan Koch (Aus) and Sam Nogajski (Aus)
Player of the match: Crishan Kalugamage (Ita)

- Italy won the toss and elected to field.
- This was the first time Italy and Nepal faced each other in T20Is.
- This was the first World Cup match victory for Italy across all formats.
- This was Italy's first 10-wicket win in T20Is and the eighth overall in T20 World Cups.

Match 23
14 February 2026
15:00 UTC+5:30 (D/N)
Scorecard

| Scotland; 152 (19.4 overs) | v | England; 155/5 (18.2 overs) |
| Richie Berrington 49 (32); Adil Rashid 3/36 (4 overs) | | Tom Banton 63* (41); Oliver Davidson 1/12 (2 overs) |

England won by 5 wickets
Eden Gardens, Kolkata
Umpires: Chris Brown (NZ) and Allahuddien Paleker (SA)
Player of the match: Tom Banton (Eng)

- England won the toss and elected to field.
- Jos Buttler (Eng) played in his 150th T20I match and scored his 4,000th run in T20Is.
- Jofra Archer (Eng) took his 50th wicket in T20Is.
- This was England's maiden victory against a European country in T20 World Cups.

Match 25
15 February 2026
11:00 UTC+5:30
Scorecard

| Nepal; 133/8 (20 overs) | v | West Indies; 134/1 (15.2 overs) |
| Dipendra Singh Airee 58 (47); Jason Holder 4/27 (4 overs) | | Shai Hope 61* (44); Nandan Yadav 1/24 (3 overs) |

West Indies won by 9 wickets
Wankhede Stadium, Mumbai
Attendance: 19,225
Umpires: Gazi Sohel (Ban) and Alex Wharf (Eng)
Player of the match: Jason Holder (WI)

- West Indies won the toss and elected to field.
- West Indies qualified for the Super 8 while Nepal were eliminated as a result of this match.

Match 29
16 February 2026
15:00 UTC+5:30 (D/N)
Scorecard

| England; 202/7 (20 overs) | v | Italy; 178 (20 overs) |
| Will Jacks 53* (22); Crishan Kalugamage 2/41 (4 overs) | | Ben Manenti 60 (25); Jamie Overton 3/18 (4 overs) |

England won by 24 runs
Eden Gardens, Kolkata
Umpires: Chris Brown (NZ) and Donovan Koch (Aus)
Player of the match: Will Jacks (Eng)

- England won the toss and elected to bat.
- This was the first time England and Italy faced each other in T20Is.
- England qualified for the Super 8 while Italy and Scotland were eliminated as a result of this match.

Match 33
17 February 2026
19:00 UTC+5:30 (N)
Scorecard

| Scotland; 170/7 (20 overs) | v | Nepal; 171/3 (19.2 overs) |
| Michael Jones 71 (45); Sompal Kami 3/25 (4 overs) | | Dipendra Singh Airee 50* (23); Michael Leask 3/30 (4 overs) |

Nepal won by 7 wickets
Wankhede Stadium, Mumbai
Attendance: 18,920
Umpires: K. N. Ananthapadmanabhan (Ind) and Alex Wharf (Eng)
Player of the match: Dipendra Singh Airee (Nep)

- Nepal won the toss and elected to field.
- This was Nepal's first win in a T20 World Cup match after 12 years.

Match 37
19 February 2026
11:00 UTC+5:30
Scorecard

| West Indies; 165/6 (20 overs) | v | Italy; 123 (18 overs) |
| Shai Hope 75 (46); Crishan Kalugamage 2/25 (4 overs) | | Ben Manenti 26 (21); Shamar Joseph 4/30 (4 overs) |

West Indies won by 42 runs
Eden Gardens, Kolkata
Umpires: Adrian Holdstock (SA) and Langton Rusere (Zim)
Player of the match: Shai Hope (WI)

- Italy won the toss and elected to field.
- Jason Holder (WI) played in his 300th international match.

=== Group D ===
Group D standings
| Pos | Team | Pld | W | L | NR | Pts | NRR | Qualification |
|---|---|---|---|---|---|---|---|---|
| 1 | South Africa | 4 | 4 | 0 | 0 | 8 | 1.943 | Advanced to the Super 8 stage |
| 2 | New Zealand | 4 | 3 | 1 | 0 | 6 | 1.227 | Advanced to the Super 8 stage |
| 3 | Afghanistan | 4 | 2 | 2 | 0 | 4 | 0.889 | Eliminated |
| 4 | United Arab Emirates | 4 | 1 | 3 | 0 | 2 | −1.364 | Eliminated |
| 5 | Canada | 4 | 0 | 4 | 0 | 0 | −2.426 | Eliminated |

Source: ESPNcricinfo
Rules for classification: 1) Points; 2) Wins; 3) Net run rate; 4) Results of games between tied teams; 5) T20I Rankings ahead of the tournament

Match 4
8 February 2026
11:00 UTC+5:30
Scorecard

| Afghanistan; 182/6 (20 overs) | v | New Zealand; 183/5 (17.5 overs) |
| Gulbadin Naib 63 (35); Lockie Ferguson 2/40 (4 overs) | | Tim Seifert 65 (42); Mujeeb Ur Rahman 2/31 (4 overs) |

New Zealand won by 5 wickets
M. A. Chidambaram Stadium, Chennai
Attendance: 24,991
Umpires: Langton Rusere (Zim) and Alex Wharf (Eng)
Player of the match: Tim Seifert (NZ)

- Afghanistan won the toss and elected to bat.
- Gulbadin Naib (Afg) scored his 1,000th run in T20Is.
- Tim Seifert (NZ) scored his 2,000th run in T20Is.
- This was New Zealand's highest run chase in the T20 World Cup.

Match 9
9 February 2026
19:00 UTC+5:30 (N)
Scorecard

| South Africa; 213/4 (20 overs) | v | Canada; 156/8 (20 overs) |
| Aiden Markram 59 (32); Ansh Patel 3/31 (4 overs) | | Navneet Dhaliwal 64 (49); Lungi Ngidi 4/31 (4 overs) |

South Africa won by 57 runs
Narendra Modi Stadium, Ahmedabad
Umpires: Jayaraman Madanagopal (Ind) and Nitin Menon (Ind)
Player of the match: Lungi Ngidi (SA)

- Canada won the toss and elected to field.
- This was the first time South Africa and Canada faced each other in T20Is.

Match 11
10 February 2026
15:00 UTC+5:30 (D/N)
Scorecard

| United Arab Emirates; 173/6 (20 overs) | v | New Zealand; 175/0 (15.2 overs) |
| Muhammad Waseem 66* (45); Matt Henry 2/37 (4 overs) | | Tim Seifert 89* (42) |

New Zealand won by 10 wickets
M. A. Chidambaram Stadium, Chennai
Attendance: 19,623
Umpires: Paul Reiffel (Aus) and Roland Black (Ire)
Player of the match: Tim Seifert (NZ)

- United Arab Emirates won the toss and elected to bat.
- Muhammad Waseem and Alishan Sharafu's 107-run partnership was the highest for any wicket by the UAE in the T20 World Cup.
- This was the UAE's highest innings total in the T20 World Cup (173).
- Tim Seifert and Finn Allen (NZ) both hit their 100th six in T20Is.
- Tim Seifert and Finn Allen's 175-run partnership was the highest partnership ever in the T20 World Cup.
- This was New Zealand's fourth 10-wicket win in T20Is and the seventh overall in T20 World Cups.

Match 13
11 February 2026
11:00 UTC+5:30
Scorecard

| South Africa; 187/6 (20 overs) | v | Afghanistan; 187 (19.4 overs) |
| Ryan Rickelton 61 (28); Azmatullah Omarzai 3/41 (4 overs) | | Rahmanullah Gurbaz 84 (42); Lungi Ngidi 3/26 (4 overs) |

Match tied (South Africa won the second Super Over)
Narendra Modi Stadium, Ahmedabad
Umpires: Jayaraman Madanagopal (Ind) and Sharfuddoula (Ban)
Player of the match: Lungi Ngidi (SA)

- Afghanistan won the toss and elected to field.
- Super Over: Afghanistan 17/0, South Africa 17/1.
- Second Super Over: South Africa 23/0, Afghanistan 19/2.

Match 20
13 February 2026
15:00 UTC+5:30 (D/N)
Scorecard

| Canada; 150/7 (20 overs) | v | United Arab Emirates; 151/5 (19.4 overs) |
| Harsh Thaker 50 (41); Junaid Siddique 5/35 (4 overs) | | Aryansh Sharma 74* (53); Saad Bin Zafar 3/14 (4 overs) |

United Arab Emirates won by 5 wickets
Arun Jaitley Cricket Stadium, New Delhi
Umpires: Adrian Holdstock (SA) and Gazi Sohel (Ban)
Player of the match: Junaid Siddique (UAE)

- Canada won the toss and elected to bat.
- Junaid Siddique (UAE) took his maiden five-wicket haul in T20Is and the 14th overall in T20 World Cups.

Match 24
14 February 2026
19:00 UTC+5:30 (N)
Scorecard

| New Zealand; 175/7 (20 overs) | v | South Africa; 178/3 (17.1 overs) |
| Mark Chapman 48 (26); Marco Jansen 4/40 (4 overs) | | Aiden Markram 86* (44); Rachin Ravindra 1/9 (1 over) |

South Africa won by 7 wickets
Narendra Modi Stadium, Ahmedabad
Attendance: 54,923
Umpires: Roland Black (Ire) and Paul Reiffel (Aus)
Player of the match: Marco Jansen (SA)

- South Africa won the toss and elected to field.
- Quinton de Kock (SA) became the first South African to score 3,000 runs in T20Is.
- Aiden Markram scored the fastest half-century (19 balls) for South Africa in the T20 World Cup and equalled with Rohit Sharma and Dasun Shanaka for the fastest half-century by a captain in the T20 World Cup.

Match 28
16 February 2026
11:00 UTC+5:30
Scorecard

| United Arab Emirates; 160/9 (20 overs) | v | Afghanistan; 162/5 (19.2 overs) |
| Sohaib Khan 68 (48); Azmatullah Omarzai 4/15 (4 overs) | | Ibrahim Zadran 53 (41); Junaid Siddique 2/23 (3.2 overs) |

Afghanistan won by 5 wickets
Arun Jaitley Cricket Stadium, New Delhi
Umpires: Roland Black (Ire) and Leslie Reifer (WI)
Player of the match: Azmatullah Omarzai (Afg)

- Afghanistan won the toss and elected to field.
- Rashid Khan (Afg) took his 700th wicket in the T20 format, the first cricketer to achieve this milestone.
- South Africa qualified for the Super 8 as a result of this match.

Match 31
17 February 2026
11:00 UTC+5:30
Scorecard

| Canada; 173/4 (20 overs) | v | New Zealand; 176/2 (15.1 overs) |
| Yuvraj Samra 110 (65); Jacob Duffy 1/25 (4 overs) | | Glenn Phillips 76* (36); Saad Bin Zafar 1/29 (3 overs) |

New Zealand won by 8 wickets
M. A. Chidambaram Stadium, Chennai
Umpires: Jayaraman Madanagopal (Ind) and Sharfuddoula (Ban)
Player of the match: Glenn Phillips (NZ)

- Canada won the toss and elected to bat.
- This was the first time Canada and New Zealand faced each other in T20Is.
- Yuvraj Samra and Dilpreet Bajwa's 116-run partnership was the highest for any wicket by Canada in the T20 World Cup.
- Yuvraj Samra became the first Canadian player, the first player from an Associate nation and the youngest player from any nation to score a century in a T20 World Cup. This was the second century in the 2026 tournament and 13th overall in the T20 World Cup history.
- New Zealand qualified for the Super 8 while Afghanistan, United Arab Emirates and Canada were eliminated as a result of this match.

Match 34
18 February 2026
11:00 UTC+5:30
Scorecard

| United Arab Emirates; 122/6 (20 overs) | v | South Africa; 123/4 (13.2 overs) |
| Alishan Sharafu 45 (38); Corbin Bosch 3/12 (4 overs) | | Dewald Brevis 36 (25); Muhammad Arfan 1/16 (2 overs) |

South Africa won by 6 wickets
Arun Jaitley Cricket Stadium, New Delhi
Umpires: Leslie Reifer (WI) and Rod Tucker (Aus)
Player of the match: Corbin Bosch (SA)

- South Africa won the toss and elected to field.

Match 39
19 February 2026
19:00 UTC+5:30 (N)
Scorecard

| Afghanistan; 200/4 (20 overs) | v | Canada; 118/8 (20 overs) |
| Ibrahim Zadran 95* (56); Jaskaran Singh 3/52 (4 overs) | | Harsh Thaker 30 (24); Mohammad Nabi 4/7 (4 overs) |

Afghanistan won by 82 runs
M. A. Chidambaram Stadium, Chennai
Umpires: Nitin Menon (Ind) and Gazi Sohel (Ban)
Player of the match: Ibrahim Zadran (Afg)

- Canada won the toss and elected to field.

== Super 8 stage ==
The top two teams from the four groups advanced to the Super 8 stage, where they were divided into two groups of four teams each. In the Super 8 stage, each team played the others in their respective group in a round-robin format, with the top two teams from each group advancing to the semifinals.

Prior to the tournament, eight teams were pre-seeded for the Super 8 stage based on the T20I rankings at the time: Australia, India, South Africa, and the West Indies in Group 1; England, New Zealand, Pakistan, and Sri Lanka in Group 2. Australia did not qualify for the Super 8 stage, and their place was taken by Zimbabwe. Due to the pre-seeding, all of the group stage winners ended up in Group 1, and all the runners-up in Group 2. The ICC faced criticism for its pre-seeding system with critics also commenting that its tournaments have always been similarly unfair. The ICC replied that the pre-seedings were made to enable fans to safely arrange travel for their team's games.

| Qualification | | Super 8 stage | |
| Qualification | | Group 1 | Group 2 |
|---|---|---|---|
| Advanced from the group stage (Top 2 teams from each group) | A | India | Pakistan |
| Advanced from the group stage (Top 2 teams from each group) | B | Zimbabwe | Sri Lanka |
| Advanced from the group stage (Top 2 teams from each group) | C | West Indies | England |
| Advanced from the group stage (Top 2 teams from each group) | D | South Africa | New Zealand |

=== Group 1 ===
Group 1 standings
| Pos | Team | Pld | W | L | NR | Pts | NRR | Qualification |
|---|---|---|---|---|---|---|---|---|
| 1 | South Africa | 3 | 3 | 0 | 0 | 6 | 2.259 | Advanced to the knockout stage |
| 2 | India (H) | 3 | 2 | 1 | 0 | 4 | 0.106 | Advanced to the knockout stage |
| 3 | West Indies | 3 | 1 | 2 | 0 | 2 | 0.993 | Eliminated |
| 4 | Zimbabwe | 3 | 0 | 3 | 0 | 0 | −3.415 | Eliminated |

Source: ESPNcricinfo
Rules for classification: 1) Points; 2) Wins; 3) Net run rate; 4) Results of games between tied teams; 5) T20I Rankings ahead of the tournament
(H) Hosts

Match 43
22 February 2026
19:00 UTC+5:30 (N)
Scorecard

| South Africa; 187/7 (20 overs) | v | India; 111 (18.5 overs) |
| David Miller 63 (35); Jasprit Bumrah 3/15 (4 overs) | | Shivam Dube 42 (37); Marco Jansen 4/22 (3.5 overs) |

South Africa won by 76 runs
Narendra Modi Stadium, Ahmedabad
Attendance: 90,954
Umpires: Chris Gaffaney (NZ) and Richard Kettleborough (Eng)
Player of the match: David Miller (SA)

- South Africa won the toss and elected to bat.
- South Africa broke India's record 12-match win streak in T20 World Cups.
- This was India's first loss at an ICC limited-overs competition since the 2023 Cricket World Cup final.
- This was India's largest loss margin (by runs) in the history of T20 World Cup.
- Jasprit Bumrah broke Ravichandran Ashwin's record for most wickets taken by an Indian in the T20 World Cup.

Match 44
23 February 2026
19:00 UTC+5:30 (N)
Scorecard

| West Indies; 254/6 (20 overs) | v | Zimbabwe; 147 (17.4 overs) |
| Shimron Hetmyer 85 (34); Blessing Muzarabani 2/42 (4 overs) | | Brad Evans 43 (21); Gudakesh Motie 4/28 (4 overs) |

West Indies won by 107 runs
Wankhede Stadium, Mumbai
Attendance: 19,199
Umpires: Richard Illingworth (Eng) and Jayaraman Madanagopal (Ind)
Player of the match: Shimron Hetmyer (WI)

- Zimbabwe won the toss and elected to field.
- Shimron Hetmyer (WI) scored the fastest half-century (19 balls) for West Indies in T20Is.
- West Indies recorded the second highest total in the T20 World Cup.
- Brad Evans and Richard Ngarava (Zim) recorded the highest partnership for the 10th wicket in the T20 World Cup.

Match 47
26 February 2026
15:00 UTC+5:30 (D/N)
Scorecard

| West Indies; 176/8 (20 overs) | v | South Africa; 177/1 (16.1 overs) |
| Romario Shepherd 52* (37); Lungi Ngidi 3/30 (4 overs) | | Aiden Markram 82* (46); Roston Chase 1/46 (4 overs) |

South Africa won by 9 wickets
Narendra Modi Stadium, Ahmedabad
Attendance: 28,422
Umpires: Kumar Dharmasena (SL) and Sharfuddoula (Ban)
Player of the match: Aiden Markram (SA)

- South Africa won the toss and elected to field.
- Jason Holder and Romario Shepherd (WI) recorded the highest partnership for the 8th wicket in T20Is.

Match 48
26 February 2026
19:00 UTC+5:30 (N)
Scorecard

| India; 256/4 (20 overs) | v | Zimbabwe; 184/6 (20 overs) |
| Abhishek Sharma 55 (30); Sikandar Raza 1/29 (3 overs) | | Brian Bennett 97* (59); Arshdeep Singh 3/24 (4 overs) |

India won by 72 runs
M. A. Chidambaram Stadium, Chennai
Umpires: Richard Kettleborough (Eng) and Alex Wharf (Eng)
Player of the match: Hardik Pandya (Ind)

- Zimbabwe won the toss and elected to field.
- Suryakumar Yadav (Ind) completed 4,000 international runs during the match.
- India recorded their highest total and the second highest total by any team in the T20 World Cup.
- South Africa qualified for their second consecutive and overall fourth T20 World Cup semi-final while Zimbabwe were eliminated as a result of this match.

Match 51
1 March 2026
15:00 UTC+5:30 (D/N)
Scorecard

| Zimbabwe; 153/7 (20 overs) | v | South Africa; 154/5 (17.5 overs) |
| Sikandar Raza 73 (43); Kwena Maphaka 2/21 (4 overs) | | Dewald Brevis 42 (18); Sikandar Raza 3/29 (4 overs) |

South Africa won by 5 wickets
Arun Jaitley Cricket Stadium, New Delhi
Umpires: Kumar Dharmasena (SL) and Richard Illingworth (Eng)
Player of the match: Sikandar Raza (Zim)

- Zimbabwe won the toss and elected to bat.
- Lungi Ngidi became the first South African cricketer to take 90 wickets in T20Is.

Match 52
1 March 2026
19:00 UTC+5:30 (N)
Scorecard

| West Indies; 195/4 (20 overs) | v | India; 199/5 (19.2 overs) |
| Roston Chase 40 (25); Jasprit Bumrah 2/36 (4 overs) | | Sanju Samson 97* (50); Jason Holder 2/38 (4 overs) |

India won by 5 wickets
Eden Gardens, Kolkata
Attendance: 58,354
Umpires: Chris Gaffaney (NZ) and Alex Wharf (Eng)
Player of the match: Sanju Samson (Ind)

- India won the toss and elected to field.
- This was India's highest successful run-chase in the T20 World Cup.
- India qualified for their third consecutive and overall sixth T20 World Cup semi-final while West Indies were eliminated as a result of this match.

=== Group 2 ===
Group 2 standings
| Pos | Team | Pld | W | L | NR | Pts | NRR | Qualification |
|---|---|---|---|---|---|---|---|---|
| 1 | England | 3 | 3 | 0 | 0 | 6 | 1.096 | Advanced to the knockout stage |
| 2 | New Zealand | 3 | 1 | 1 | 1 | 3 | 1.390 | Advanced to the knockout stage |
| 3 | Pakistan | 3 | 1 | 1 | 1 | 3 | −0.123 | Eliminated |
| 4 | Sri Lanka (H) | 3 | 0 | 3 | 0 | 0 | −1.950 | Eliminated |

Source: ESPNcricinfo
Rules for classification: 1) Points; 2) Wins; 3) Net run rate; 4) Results of games between tied teams; 5) T20I Rankings ahead of the tournament
(H) Hosts

Match 41
21 February 2026
19:00 UTC+5:30 (N)
Scorecard

| Pakistan | v | New Zealand |

No result
R. Premadasa Stadium, Colombo
Umpires: Paul Reiffel (Aus) and Rod Tucker (Aus)

- Pakistan won the toss and elected to bat.
- No play was possible due to rain.
- This was the 50th T20I game between New Zealand and Pakistan.
- Daryl Mitchell (NZ) played in his 100th T20I match.

Match 42
22 February 2026
15:00 UTC+5:30 (D/N)
Scorecard

| England; 146/9 (20 overs) | v | Sri Lanka; 95 (16.4 overs) |
| Phil Salt 62 (40); Dunith Wellalage 3/26 (4 overs) | | Dasun Shanaka 30 (24); Will Jacks 3/22 (4 overs) |

England won by 51 runs
Pallekele Cricket Stadium, Kandy
Umpires: Adrian Holdstock (SA) and Ahsan Raza (Pak)
Player of the match: Will Jacks (Eng)

- Sri Lanka won the toss and elected to field.

Match 45
24 February 2026
19:00 UTC+5:30 (N)
Scorecard

| Pakistan; 164/9 (20 overs) | v | England; 166/8 (19.1 overs) |
| Sahibzada Farhan 63 (45); Liam Dawson 3/24 (4 overs) | | Harry Brook 100 (51); Shaheen Afridi 4/30 (4 overs) |

England won by 2 wickets
Pallekele Cricket Stadium, Kandy
Umpires: Nitin Menon (Ind) and Sam Nogajski (Aus)
Player of the match: Harry Brook (Eng)

- Pakistan won the toss and elected to bat.
- Shadab Khan (Pak) scored his 1,000th run in T20Is. He also became the first cricketer from Pakistan to score 1,000 runs and take 100 wickets in T20Is.
- Harry Brook (Eng) scored his maiden century in T20Is. He also became the first captain to score a century in the T20 World Cup. This was the fourth century in the 2026 tournament and 15th overall in the T20 World Cup history.
- England qualified for their fifth consecutive and overall sixth T20 World Cup semi-final as a result of this match.

Match 46
25 February 2026
19:00 UTC+5:30 (N)
Scorecard

| New Zealand; 168/7 (20 overs) | v | Sri Lanka; 107/8 (20 overs) |
| Mitchell Santner 47 (26); Maheesh Theekshana 3/30 (4 overs) | | Kamindu Mendis 31 (23); Rachin Ravindra 4/27 (4 overs) |

New Zealand won by 61 runs
R. Premadasa Stadium, Colombo
Umpires: Allahudien Paleker (SA) and Asif Yaqoob (Pak)
Player of the match: Rachin Ravindra (NZ)

- Sri Lanka won the toss and elected to field.
- Mitchell Santner (NZ) scored his 1,000th run in T20Is. He also became the first cricketer from New Zealand to score 1000 runs and take 100 wickets in T20Is.
- Sri Lanka were eliminated as a result of this match.

Match 49
27 February 2026
19:00 UTC+5:30 (N)
Scorecard

| New Zealand; 159/7 (20 overs) | v | England; 161/6 (19.3 overs) |
| Glenn Phillips 39 (28); Will Jacks 2/23 (4 overs) | | Tom Banton 33 (24); Rachin Ravindra 3/19 (4 overs) |

England won by 4 wickets
R. Premadasa Stadium, Colombo
Umpires: Adrian Holdstock (SA) and Ahsan Raza (Pak)
Player of the match: Will Jacks (Eng)

- New Zealand won the toss and elected to bat.
- Matt Henry (NZ) took his 50th wicket in T20Is.
- Will Jacks (Eng) equalled Shane Watson's 2012 record for the most player of the match awards by a player in a single edition of the T20 World Cup (4).

Match 50
28 February 2026
19:00 UTC+5:30 (N)
Scorecard

| Pakistan; 212/8 (20 overs) | v | Sri Lanka; 207/6 (20 overs) |
| Sahibzada Farhan 100 (60); Dilshan Madushanka 3/33 (4 overs) | | Dasun Shanaka 76* (31); Abrar Ahmed 3/23 (4 overs) |

Pakistan won by 5 runs
Pallekele Cricket Stadium, Kandy
Umpires: Sam Nogajski (Aus) and Rod Tucker (Aus)
Player of the match: Sahibzada Farhan (Pak)

- Sri Lanka won the toss and elected to field.
- Sahibzada Farhan and Fakhar Zaman's 176-run partnership for Pakistan was the highest partnership ever in the T20 World Cup.
- Sahibzada Farhan (Pak) broke Virat Kohli's 2014 record for most runs scored in a single edition of the T20 World Cup (383 runs). He also became the first batsman to score two centuries in a single edition of the T20 World Cup. This was the fifth century in the 2026 tournament and 16th overall in the T20 World Cup history.
- Abrar Ahmed (Pak) took his 50th wicket in T20Is.
- Dasun Shanaka became the first Sri Lankan to hit 100 sixes in T20Is and the first captain to score 20 sixes in the T20 World Cup. He also broke Kusal Perera's 2017 record for most sixes in a T20I innings for Sri Lanka (8 sixes).
- New Zealand qualified for their fifth T20 World Cup semi-final while Pakistan were eliminated as a result of this match.

== Knockout stage ==
The knockout stage consisted of two semi-finals played on 4 and 5 March, and the final on 8 March. Both semi-finals and the final had a reserve day available on 5, 6, and 9 March respectively. If a reserve day had come into play, the match would not have been restarted but instead resumed from the previous day's play, if there was any; with the semi-finals commencing at 15:00 and final at 19:00 (both UTC+05:30). In the event of no minimum play (at least 10 overs per side) on the scheduled day and the reserve day, in the semi-finals, the team that finished higher in the Super 8 stage would progress to the final, and if no play were possible in the final, the teams would be declared as joint-winners. If any match ended in a tie, a Super Over would be used to determine the winner. If the scores in the Super Over were also tied, subsequent Super Overs would be played until there was a result.

The first semi-final and the final were scheduled to be held at Eden Gardens in Kolkata and Narendra Modi Stadium in Ahmedabad respectively, but both would have been moved to the R. Premadasa Stadium in Colombo if Pakistan had qualified. The second semi-final was held at the Wankhede Stadium in Mumbai. If either India or Sri Lanka qualified, and Pakistan failed to, they would have played in the first and second semi-finals, respectively. If Sri Lanka was not playing India, the first semi-final would be held in Colombo as well. Otherwise, the winner of Group 1 and the runner-up of Group 2 would play in the first semi-final, while, the winner of Group 2 and the runner-up of Group 1 would play in the second.

=== Bracket ===
Semi-finals
1W | South Africa | 169/8 (20 overs)
2R | New Zealand | 173/1 (12.5 overs)
2W | England | 246/7 (20 overs)
1R | India | 253/7 (20 overs)

Final
SF1W | New Zealand | 159 (19 overs)
SF2W | India | 255/5 (20 overs)

=== Semi-finals ===
Semi-final 1
4 March 2026
19:00 UTC+5:30 (N)
Scorecard

| South Africa; 169/8 (20 overs) | v | New Zealand; 173/1 (12.5 overs) |
| Marco Jansen 55* (30); Cole McConchie 2/9 (1 over) | | Finn Allen 100* (33); Kagiso Rabada 1/28 (3 overs) |

New Zealand won by 9 wickets
Eden Gardens, Kolkata
Attendance: 33,533
Umpires: Richard Illingworth (Eng) and Alex Wharf (Eng)
Player of the match: Finn Allen (NZ)

- New Zealand won the toss and elected to field.
- Finn Allen broke Glenn Phillips's record for the fastest half-century by a New Zealand batter in the T20 World Cup.
- Finn Allen (NZ) scored the fastest century in the T20 World Cup and became the first player to score a century in T20 World Cup knockouts. This was the sixth century in the 2026 tournament and 17th overall in the T20 World Cup.
- New Zealand qualified for their second T20 World Cup final.

Semi-final 2
5 March 2026
19:00 UTC+5:30 (N)
Scorecard

| India; 253/7 (20 overs) | v | England; 246/7 (20 overs) |
| Sanju Samson 89 (42); Will Jacks 2/40 (4 overs) | | Jacob Bethell 105 (48); Hardik Pandya 2/38 (4 overs) |

India won by 7 runs
Wankhede Stadium, Mumbai
Umpires: Chris Gaffaney (NZ) and Allahudien Paleker (SA)
Player of the match: Sanju Samson (Ind)

- England won the toss and elected to field.
- This was India's 20th appearance in a semi-final of an ICC limited-overs tournaments; the most by any nation.
- This was the third consecutive T20 World Cup semi-final between India and England.
- India's 253 was the highest total in T20 World Cup knockouts.
- The 499 runs scored in this match was the highest match aggregate in T20 World Cup history and second highest in T20Is.
- Jacob Bethell (Eng) scored his maiden T20I century and the highest individual score in T20 World Cup knockout matches. This was the seventh century of the 2026 tournament and 18th overall in T20 World Cup history. Bethell also became the fourth England player to score a century in all three international formats.
- India became the first team to qualify for four T20 World Cup finals.

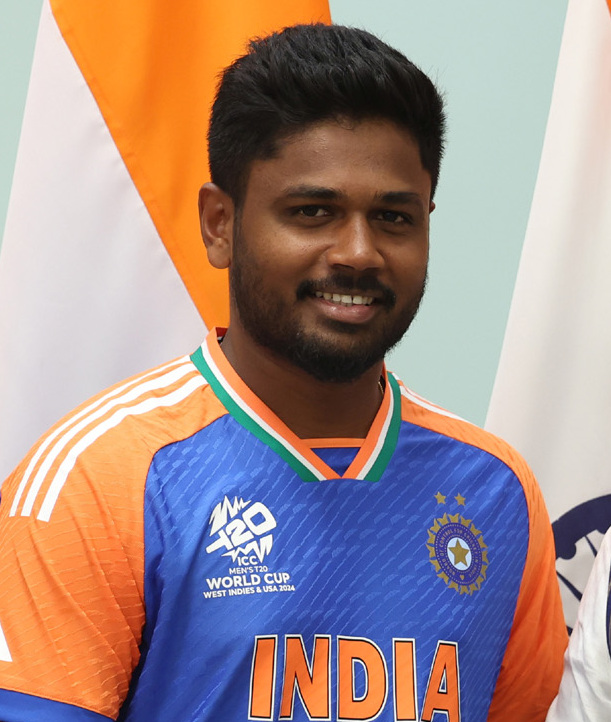
India's Sanju Samson received the player of the match for the Semi-final 2, and the player of the tournament award.

=== Final ===
New Zealand won the toss and elected to field first. Indian opener Sanju Samson scored 89 runs from 46 balls along with half-centuries from Abhishek Sharma and Ishan Kishan. James Neesham dismissed Samson, Kishan and Suryakumar Yadav in the 16th over. In the final two overs, Shivam Dube scored 26 runs from 8 balls to take India to the total of 255 runs for the loss of five wickets—the highest total in a T20 World Cup knockout match. Chasing the target, New Zealand opener Tim Seifert was the only batter from his team to register a 50+ score; Mitchell Santner scored 43 runs, Daryl Mitchell scored 17 runs, while the remaining batters were dismissed for single-digit scores. New Zealand were all-out for 159 to see them lose by 96 runs.

This was India's third T20 World Cup title victory, after 2007 and 2024. India were the first team to successfully defend their title to win two consecutive titles and the first tournament hosts to win. Suryakumar Yadav became the fourth Indian captain to win a major ICC event after Kapil Dev, MS Dhoni and Rohit Sharma. Jasprit Bumrah picked up four wickets for India, conceding only 15 runs in 4 overs and received the player of the match award. The match was attended by 86,824 fans.

8 March 2026 (N)
Scorecard

| India; 255/5 (20 overs) | v | New Zealand; 159 (19 overs) |

India won by 96 runs
Narendra Modi Stadium, Ahmedabad

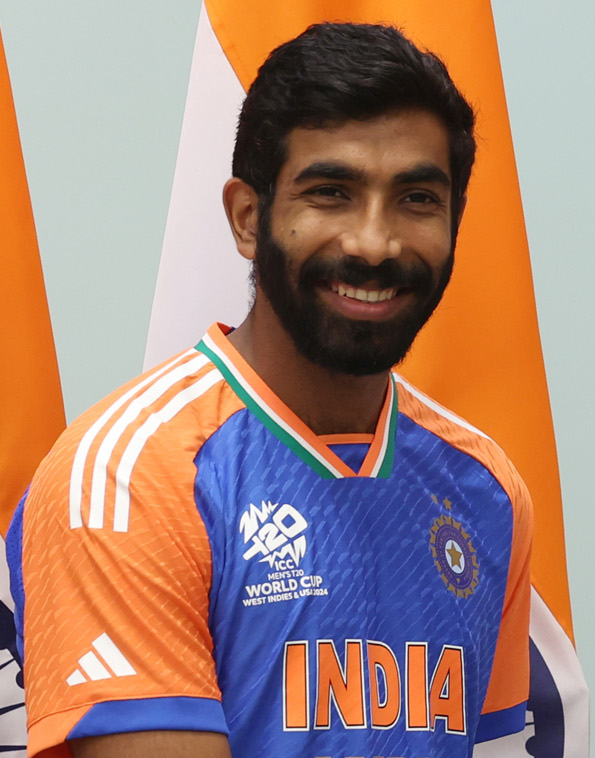
Jasprit Bumrah received the player of the match award for the final.

== Statistics ==
Sahibzada Farhan of Pakistan scored the most runs in the 2026 tournament (383 runs from 6 innings). This was also the most runs in a single T20 World Cup, surpassing Virat Kohli's 2014 record. A total of seven centuries were scored in the 2026 tournament surpassing the previous high of two in a single edition of T20 World Cup (2010, 2014, 2016 and 2022). Jasprit Bumrah and Varun Chakravarthy of India both took 14 wickets each and were tied for the most wickets in the 2026 tournament.

Most runs
| Runs | Player | Team |
|---|---|---|
| 383 | Sahibzada Farhan | Pakistan |
| 326 | Tim Seifert | New Zealand |
| 321 | Sanju Samson | India |
| 317 | Ishan Kishan | India |
| 298 | Finn Allen | New Zealand |

Most wickets
| Wickets | Player | Team |
|---|---|---|
| 14 | Jasprit Bumrah | India |
| 14 | Varun Chakravarthy | India |
| 13 | Shadley van Schalkwyk | United States |
| 13 | Blessing Muzarabani | Zimbabwe |
| 13 | Adil Rashid | England |

== Team of the tournament ==
On 9 March, the ICC announced its team of the tournament with Sanju Samson being named as player of the tournament and Aiden Markram as the captain of the team.

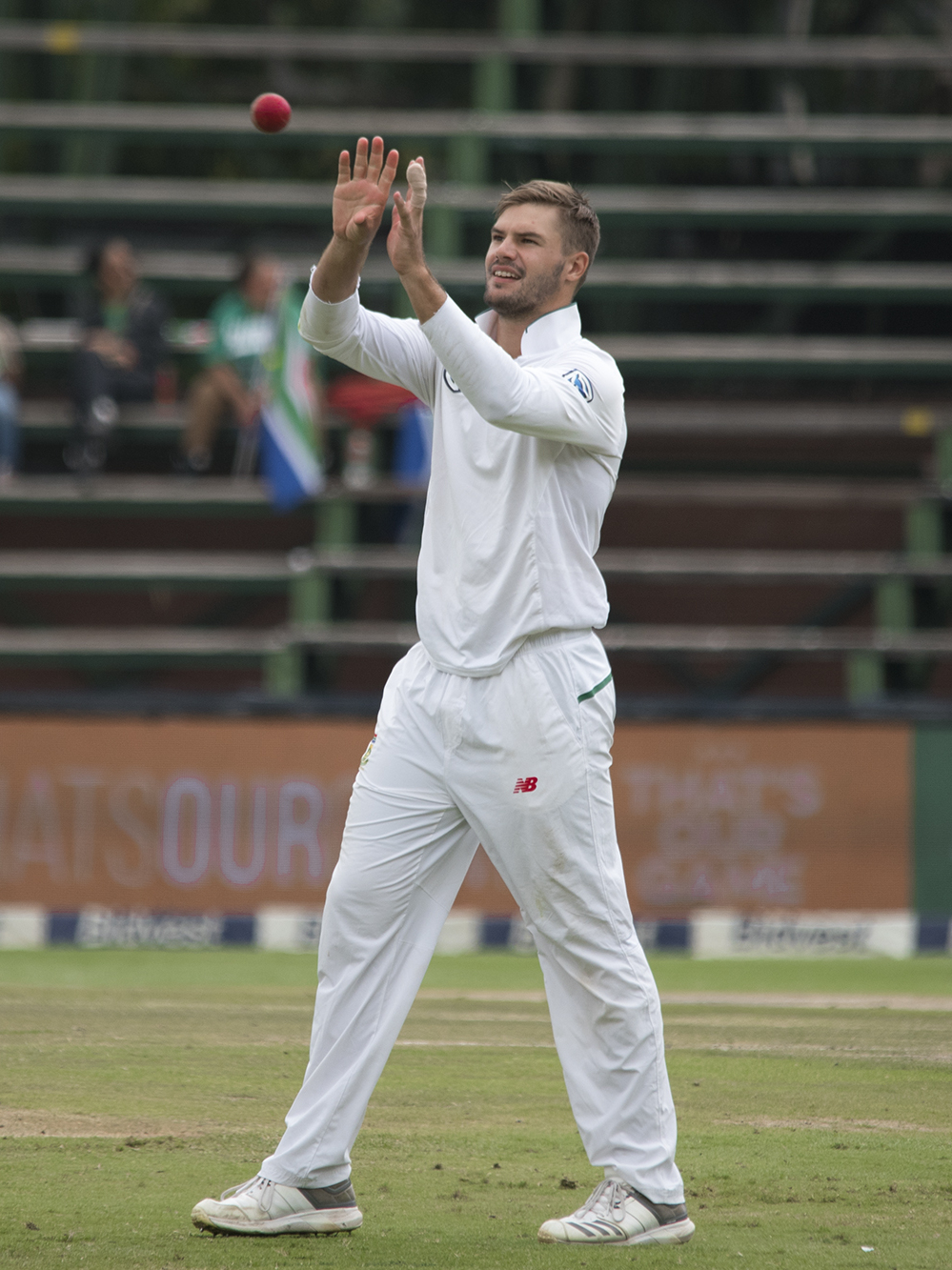
South Africa's Aiden Markram was named as the captain for the ICC's team of the tournament.

Team of the tournament
| Player | Team | Role |
|---|---|---|
| Sahibzada Farhan | Pakistan | Batter |
| Sanju Samson | India | Wicket-keeper |
| Ishan Kishan | India | Batter |
| Aiden Markram | South Africa | Batter / Captain |
| Hardik Pandya | India | All-rounder |
| Will Jacks | England | All-rounder |
| Jason Holder | West Indies | All-rounder |
| Jasprit Bumrah | India | Bowler |
| Lungi Ngidi | South Africa | Bowler |
| Adil Rashid | England | Bowler |
| Blessing Muzarabani | Zimbabwe | Bowler |
| Shadley van Schalkwyk | United States | 12th player |

== Controversies ==
=== Withdrawal of Bangladesh ===
After the Bangladeshi cricketer Mustafizur Rahman was released by the Kolkata Knight Riders, on the BCCI's request, from the 2026 Indian Premier League squad, on 3 January 2026, the Bangladesh Cricket Board (BCB) requested for Bangladesh's matches at the World Cup to be moved from India, citing security reasons. Officials from the ICC met with members of the BCB to try and find a solution to the issue. On 6 January, ESPNcricinfo reported that the ICC rejected the BCB's request and Bangladesh would forfeit points if they refused to play. A day later, the BCB denied this, stating, "the ICC has conveyed its willingness to work closely with the BCB to address [our] concerns".

On 12 January, media reported that the Tamil Nadu Cricket Association and the Kerala Cricket Association offered to host the matches at M. A. Chidambaram Stadium at Chennai and Greenfield International Stadium at Thiruvananthapuram respectively instead of Eden Gardens and Wankhede Stadium in India. The same day, the ICC refused Bangladesh's security assessment, stating that "there was no overall threat to the [team]" and that there was "low to moderate risks [to the team] in some venues and low to nil in others". A day later, the BCB reiterated its request to move Bangladesh's matches outside of India citing security concerns. On 17 January, the BCB requested to swap groups with Ireland, who were scheduled to play their matches in Sri Lanka, which was rejected by the ICC.

On 18 January, the ICC announced that the final decision on the matter would be taken after the board meeting scheduled on 21 January. Following the meeting on 21 January, the ICC refused to shift Bangladesh's matches, and offered a revised deadline of one day for the BCB to decide on the participation. The next day, the BCB reiterated their refusal to play in India. On 24 January, the ICC officially announced that Bangladesh would be replaced by Scotland, the next highest ranked team in the ICC T20I rankings, who had not qualified for the tournament. In a press release issued on 9 February 2026, the ICC stated that no financial, sporting, or administrative penalty would be imposed on the BCB with regards to its withdrawal from the tournament. It also said that the BCB have the right to appeal against the same as per existing ICC regulations, and Bangladesh would be given the hosting rights to an ICC event in the 2028–2031 events cycle.

=== India–Pakistan tensions ===
On 1 February, the Pakistani government allowed its cricket team to participate in the World Cup but directed the team not to play its match against India on February 15. While the PCB did not officially communicate the decision to the ICC, it was reportedly taken in protest against the ICC's refusal to relocate Bangladesh's matches out of India. The ICC warned the PCB of possible sanctions for a potential boycott of the match against India. Following discussions between the ICC, PCB and BCB, on 9 February, the Pakistan government announced that it was directing the team to take part in the match against India.

During the India–Pakistan match on the 15 February 2026, there was no handshake between the Indian captain Suryakumar Yadav and the Pakistani captain Salman Ali Agha, which typically happens during coin tosses, and among players after the match is concluded. This policy has continued since the 2025 Asia Cup, due to the Pahalgam terror attack and the 2025 India–Pakistan conflict. However, this is the first time this has occurred in an ICC tournament.

=== Match-fixing allegations ===
In April 2026, it was reported that the Canadian captain Dilpreet Bajwa had been interviewed by the ICC anti-corruption unit in relation to a possible match-fixing during Canada's first-round game against New Zealand, including the bowling of a deliberate no-ball. The Fifth Estate, a Canadian Broadcasting Corporation program, alleged that Bajwa had links with the Bishnoi Gang, an Indian organised crime outfit, which reportedly had infiltrated Cricket Canada and facilitated Bajwa's rise to the captaincy. Following publication of the report, the ICC froze funding to Cricket Canada. In June 2026, the ICC suspended Cricket Canada's membership, with the national teams continuing to function under the ICC's direct oversight.

== Broadcasting ==
JioStar handled the global broadcasting rights as part of its deal with the ICC, and the global broadcasters for the tournament were confirmed by the ICC on 5 February 2026. The matches were broadcast across more than 80 territories. The matches were also broadcast through ICC.tv and the ICC's official YouTube channel. JioHotstar provided a vertical live feed along with 360 degree view and multi-camera features. The ICC partnered with American sports podcaster Jomboy to provide an alternate commentary feed for American viewers.

Broadcasters for the tournament
| Region | Country/Sub-region | Broadcasting licensee(s) | Broadcasting platforms | Radio |
|---|---|---|---|---|
| Africa | Middle East and North Africa | E& | CricLife Max & StarzPlay | —N/a |
| Africa | Sub-Saharan Africa | SuperSport | SS Cricket | —N/a |
| Americas | Canada | Willow | Willow TV & Cricbuzz | —N/a |
| Americas | Caribbean Islands | ESPN | ESPN Caribbean & Disney+ | —N/a |
| Americas | United States | Willow | Willow TV & Cricbuzz | —N/a |
| Asia | Afghanistan | Lemar TV | Lemar TV | —N/a |
| Asia | Bangladesh | TSM | Nagorik TV, T Sports, Toffee & Rabbithole | —N/a |
| Asia | Bahrain | —N/a | VOX & Epix Cinemas | —N/a |
| Asia | Qatar | —N/a | VOX & Epix Cinemas | —N/a |
| Asia | Kuwait | —N/a | VOX & Epix Cinemas | —N/a |
| Asia | China | International Cricket Council | Douyin (only final) | —N/a |
| Asia | Hong Kong | Cricbuzz | Cricbuzz, Astro Cricket & PCCW | —N/a |
| Asia | India | Disney Star | Star Sports & JioHotstar | All India Radio |
| Asia | Malaysia | Cricbuzz | Cricbuzz, Astro Cricket & PCCW | —N/a |
| Asia | Nepal | Kantipur Television | Kantipur MAX & Styx Nepal | —N/a |
| Asia | Oman | —N/a | VOX Cinemas | —N/a |
| Asia | Pakistan | PTV & Myco | PTV Sports & Geo Super; Myco, Tamasha, ARY ZAP & Tapmad | —N/a |
| Asia | Pacific Islands | Digicel | PNG Digicel | —N/a |
| Asia | Singapore | Hub Sports | Hub Sports 4 | —N/a |
| Asia | Sri Lanka | Dialog TV | Dialog Play, Peo TV, ThePapare & TV Supreme | FM Derana |
| Asia | United Arab Emirates | —N/a | VOX Cinemas, Reel, Roxy, Cinepolis & Star | —N/a |
| Europe | Ireland | Sky Sports | Sky Sports Cricket, Sky Sports Main Event & Sky Go | —N/a |
| Europe | Italy | Sky Sports | Sky Italia | —N/a |
| Europe | Netherlands | NOS | NOS | —N/a |
| Europe | United Kingdom | Sky Sports | Sky Sports Cricket, Sky Sports Main Event, Sky Go & Now | BBC Radio |
| Oceania | Australia | Amazon | Prime Video | ABC Radio & SEN |
| Oceania | New Zealand | Sky TV NZ | Sky Sport & Sky Sport Now | —N/a |
| In-flight & At sea | | Sport 24 | Sport 24 & Sport 24 Live | —N/a |
| Rest of the world | | International Cricket Council | ICC.tv & YouTube | —N/a |

=== Commentators ===
The ICC released the following list of commentators for the tournament on 6 February 2026.

- Roshan Abeysinghe
- Wasim Akram
- Russel Arnold
- Michael Atherton
- Samuel Badree
- Temba Bavuma
- Harsha Bhogle
- Ian Bishop
- Carlos Brathwaite
- Simon Doull
- Aaron Finch
- Sunil Gavaskar
- Natalie Germanos
- Matthew Hayden
- Mark Howard
- Nasser Hussain
- Raunak Kapoor
- Dinesh Karthik
- Athar Ali Khan
- Bazid Khan
- Nick Knight
- Andrew Leonard
- Katey Martin
- Angelo Mathews
- Mpumelelo Mbangwa
- Preston Mommsen
- Eoin Morgan
- Danny Morrison
- Kass Naidoo
- Niall O'Brien
- Shaun Pollock
- Ramiz Raja
- Kumar Sangakkara
- Ravi Shastri
- Ian Smith
- Dale Steyn
- Robin Uthappa
- Ian Ward
- Alan Wilkins
- Waqar Younis

=== Viewership ===
The semi-final 2 between India and England had a peak of 65.2 million concurrent viewers and a total of 619 million views, becoming the most watched T20 match, surpassing 2024 Men's T20 World Cup final. The final match had a peak of 72.5 million concurrent viewers.

== See also ==
- International cricket in 2025–26
- Associate international cricket in 2025–26
- 2026 Women's T20 World Cup
- 2026 Women's T20 World Cup final
- 2026 Women's T20 World Cup qualification
- 2026 Women's T20 World Cup squads
- International cricket in 2026
- Associate international cricket in 2026
