= 2026 Men's T20 World Cup final =

International cricket match

2026 ICC Men's T20 World Cup final
- Match programme cover
- Event: 2026 ICC Men's T20 World Cup
India	New Zealand
255/5	159
20 overs	19 overs
- India won by 96 runs
- Date: 8 March 2026 19:00 UTC+5:30
- Venue: Narendra Modi Stadium, Ahmedabad
- Player of the match: Jasprit Bumrah (Ind)
- Umpires: Richard Illingworth (Eng) and Alex Wharf (Eng)
- Attendance: 86,824

The 2026 ICC Men's T20 World Cup final was a Twenty20 International (T20I) cricket match played at the Narendra Modi Stadium in Ahmedabad, India, on 8 March 2026 to determine the winner of the 2026 ICC Men's T20 World Cup. It was played between the defending champions India and New Zealand.

New Zealand won the toss and elected to field first; India registered a score of 255/5 in their innings. In the second innings, New Zealand were all out for 159. India won the match by 96 runs, retaining the title they had won at the previous tournament. India became the first team in the tournament to win three T20 World Cup titles, defend their title, and the first host country to win the title.

== Background ==
The 2026 ICC Men's T20 World Cup was the tenth edition of the ICC Men's T20 World Cup, a biennial world cup for cricket in Twenty20 International (T20I) format, organized by the International Cricket Council (ICC). In November 2021 as part of the 2024-2031 ICC men's hosts cycle, the ICC announced that the 2026 ICC Men's T20 World Cup would be played in India and Sri Lanka.

On 6 November 2025, the ICC announced the finalised venues for the tournament, with the Narendra Modi Stadium in Ahmedabad, India named as the venue for the final scheduled for 8 March 2026. The match would have been moved to R. Premadasa Stadium in Colombo, Sri Lanka, if Pakistan had qualified.

This was New Zealand's second T20 World Cup final after being runners-up in 2021 while it was India's fourth final, having been champions in 2007 and 2024 and runners-up in 2014. Before this match, India and New Zealand had played each other three times in the T20 World Cup, with New Zealand winning on all three occasions (2007, 2016 and 2021).

== Road to the final ==
=== Overview ===
- Source: ESPNcricinfo

New Zealand				vs	India
Opponent	Date	Result	Points	Match	Opponent	Date	Result	Points
Group D				Group stage	Group A
Afghanistan	8 February 2026	Won	2	1	United States	7 February 2026	Won	2
United Arab Emirates	10 February 2026	Won	4	2	Namibia	12 February 2026	Won	4
South Africa	14 February 2026	Lost	4	3	Pakistan	15 February 2026	Won	6
Canada	17 February 2026	Won	6	4	Netherlands	18 February 2026	Won	8
Group 2				Super 8 stage	Group 1
Pakistan	21 February 2026	N/R	1	5	South Africa	22 February 2026	Lost	0
Sri Lanka	25 February 2026	Won	3	6	Zimbabwe	26 February 2026	Won	2
England	27 February 2026	Lost	3	7	West Indies	1 March 2026	Won	4
Semi-final 1				Knockout stage	Semi-final 2
South Africa	4 March 2026	Won		SF	England	5 March 2026	Won
2026 ICC Men's T20 World Cup final

=== New Zealand ===
New Zealand began their T20 World Cup campaign with a victory over Afghanistan at M. A. Chidambaram Stadium in Chennai, and went on to defeat United Arab Emirates at the same venue. They lost to South Africa in Ahmedabad, and defeated Canada in Chennai to finish the group stage as runners-up of Group D. In the Super 8 stage, their first game against Pakistan was abandoned due to rain in Colombo. They went on to defeat co-hosts Sri Lanka, but lost to England at the same venue. Due to having a higher net run rate over Pakistan, New Zealand finished as runners-up of Group 2. New Zealand then defeated South Africa in the semi-final 1 at the Eden Gardens in Kolkata in a re-match of their group stage fixture to qualify for their second T20 World Cup final.

=== India ===
India began their T20 World Cup campaign with a victory over the United States at Wankhede Stadium in Mumbai, and went on to defeat Namibia at Arun Jaitley Stadium in Delhi, Pakistan in Colombo, and Netherlands in Ahmedabad to finish the group stage as winners of Group A. In the Super 8 stage, they lost to South Africa in Ahmedabad in their first game ending their record-breaking win streaks (12 at T20 World Cups and 17 at ICC limited-overs tournaments). They went on to defeat Zimbabwe in Chennai, and West Indies in Kolkata to finish as runners-up of Group 1. India then defeated England in the semi-final 2 in Mumbai in a tight-contest to qualify for their record fourth T20 World Cup final.

== Match ==
=== Match officials ===
On 6 March 2026, the ICC named England's Richard Illingworth and Alex Wharf as the on-field umpires, along with South Africa's Allahudien Paleker as the third umpire and Adrian Holdstock as the reserve umpire, and Zimbabwe's Andy Pycroft as match referee.

=== Team and toss ===
New Zealand's captain Mitchell Santner won the toss and elected to field. New Zealand brought in Jacob Duffy in place of Cole McConchie, while India remained unchanged from their respective semi-final matches.

- India: Sanju Samson (wk), Abhishek Sharma, Ishan Kishan, Suryakumar Yadav (c), Tilak Varma, Shivam Dube, Hardik Pandya, Axar Patel, Arshdeep Singh, Varun Chakravarthy, Jasprit Bumrah
- New Zealand: Finn Allen, Tim Seifert (wk), Rachin Ravindra, Glenn Phillips, Mark Chapman, Daryl Mitchell, Mitchell Santner (c), James Neesham, Matt Henry, Lockie Ferguson, Jacob Duffy

=== Match scorecard ===
8 March 2026
19:00 UTC+5:30 (N)
Scorecard

India; 255/5 (20 overs)	v	New Zealand; 159 (19 overs)
Sanju Samson 89 (46); James Neesham 3/46 (4 overs)		Tim Seifert 52 (26); Jasprit Bumrah 4/15 (4 overs)

India won by 96 runs
Narendra Modi Stadium, Ahmedabad
Attendance: 86,824
Umpires: Richard Illingworth (Eng) and Alex Wharf (Eng)
Player of the match: Jasprit Bumrah (Ind)

- New Zealand won the toss and elected to field.
- This was India's fourth T20 World Cup final; most for any nation.
- This was India's 15th appearance at the finals of ICC limited-overs tournaments; the most by any nation.
- India scored the highest-ever total (255) in the T20 World Cup finals, surpassing their own score of 176 in 2024.
- Sanju Samson (Ind) made the highest individual score in the Men's T20 World Cup finals.
- India became the first team to win three T20 World Cup titles. They also became the first team to win two consecutive titles, and the first host country to win the tournament.

=== India innings ===
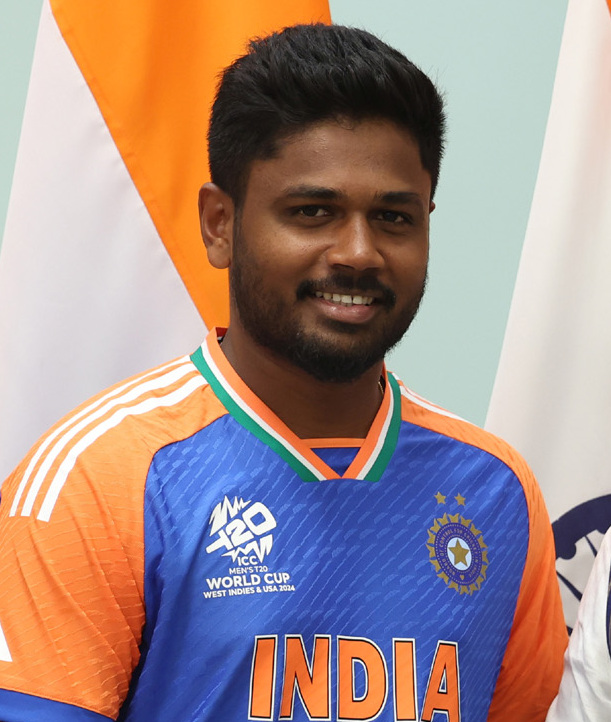
Sanju Samson scored 89 runs from 46 balls for India in the final.

Put to bat first, Indian openers Sanju Samson and Abhishek Sharma put on a 98-run partnership in 7 overs with each scoring half-centuries in 33 and 18 balls respectively. Following Sharma's dismissal in the eighth over, Ishan Kishan scored a half-century in 23 balls to put on a 105-run partnership with Samson. Both Samson and Kishan were dismissed in the 16th over of James Neesham, followed by Indian captain Suryakumar Yadav's dismissal for a duck in the same over. In the final two overs, Shivam Dube scored 26 runs from 8 balls to take India to a total of 255 runs for the loss of five wickets. Samson was the highest run-scorer for India with 89 runs from 46 balls while Neesham picked up three wickets for New Zealand.

India batting
Player	Status	Runs	Balls	4s	6s	Strike rate
Sanju Samson	c sub (McConchie) b Neesham	89	46	5	8	193.47
Abhishek Sharma	c Seifert b Ravindra	52	21	6	3	247.62
Ishan Kishan	c Chapman b Neesham	54	25	4	4	216.00
Hardik Pandya	c Santner b Henry	18	13	1	1	138.46
Suryakumar Yadav	c Ravindra b Neesham	0	1	0	0	0.00
Tilak Varma	not out	8	6	0	0	133.33
Shivam Dube	not out	26	8	3	2	325.00
Axar Patel	did not bat					
Varun Chakravarthy	did not bat					
Arshdeep Singh	did not bat					
Jasprit Bumrah	did not bat					
Extras	(w 8)	8				
Total	(5 wickets; 20 overs)	255		19	18	RR: 12.75

Fall of wickets: 1/98 (Abhishek, 7.1 ov), 2/203 (Samsom, 15.1 ov), 3/204 (Kishan, 15.5 ov), 4/204 (Yadav, 15.6 ov), 5/226 (Pandya, 18.2 ov)

New Zealand bowling
Bowler	Overs	Maidens	Runs	Wickets	Econ	Wides	NBs
Matt Henry	4	0	49	1	12.25	4	0
Glenn Phillips	1	0	5	0	5.00	0	0
Jacob Duffy	3	0	42	0	14.00	1	0
Lockie Ferguson	2	0	48	0	24.00	3	0
Mitchell Santner	4	0	33	0	8.25	0	0
Rachin Ravindra	2	0	32	1	16.00	0	0
James Neesham	4	0	46	3	11.50	0	0

=== New Zealand innings ===
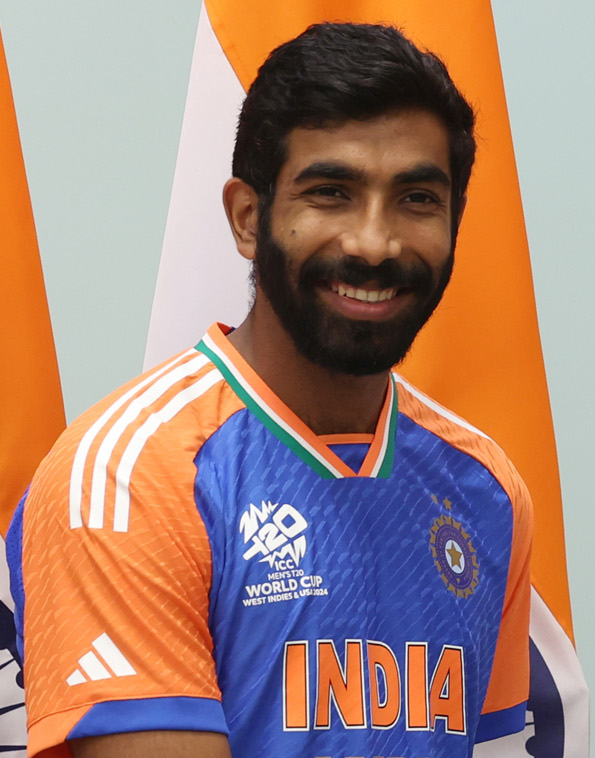
Jasprit Bumrah took 4 wickets for India in the final, and received the player of the match award.

Chasing the target of 256, New Zealand opener Tim Seifert scored a half-century in 23 balls, while four New Zealand batters were dismissed for single-digit scores. Daryl Mitchell was dismissed for 17 runs, New Zealand captain Mitchell Santner was dismissed for 43 runs, and the remaining three batters were also dismissed for single-digit scores; bundling out New Zealand for 159. Seifert was the highest run-scorer for New Zealand with 52 runs from 26 balls while Jasprit Bumrah picked up four wickets for India, giving away only 15 runs in 4 overs and received the player of the match award.

New Zealand batting
Player	Status	Runs	Balls	4s	6s	Strike rate
Tim Seifert	c Kishan b Chakravarthy	52	26	2	5	200.00
Finn Allen	c Tilak b Patel	9	7	1	0	128.57
Rachin Ravindra	c Kishan b Bumrah	1	2	0	0	50.00
Glenn Phillips	b Patel	5	5	1	0	100.00
Mark Chapman	b Pandya	3	8	0	0	37.50
Daryl Mitchell	c Kishan b Patel	17	11	0	2	154.54
Mitchell Santner	b Bumrah	43	35	3	2	123.00
James Neesham	b Bumrah	8	7	1	0	114.28
Matt Henry	b Bumrah	0	1	0	0	0.00
Lockie Ferguson	not out	6	7	0	0	85.71
Jacob Duffy	c Tilak b Abhishek	3	5	0	0	60.00
Extras	(b 4, lb 1, w 7)	12				
Total	(10 wickets; 19 overs)	159		8	9	RR: 8.36

Fall of wickets: 1/31 (Allen, 2.4 ov), 2/32 (Ravindra, 3.1 ov), 3/48 (Phillips, 4.5 ov), 4/70 (Chapman, 7.4 ov), 5/72 (Seifert, 8.1 ov), 6/124 (Mitchell, 12.5 ov), 7/141 (Neesham, 15.3 ov), 8/141 (Henry, 15.4 ov), 9/152 (Santner, 17.3 ov), 10/159 (Duffy, 18.6 ov)

India bowling
Bowler	Overs	Maidens	Runs	Wickets	Econ	Wides	NBs
Arshdeep Singh	4	0	32	0	8.00	5	0
Hardik Pandya	4	0	36	1	9.00	1	0
Axar Patel	3	0	27	3	9.00	0	0
Jasprit Bumrah	4	0	15	4	3.75	1	0
Varun Chakravarthy	3	0	39	1	13.00	0	0
Abhishek Sharma	1	0	5	1	5.00	0	0

== Aftermath ==
This was India's third T20 World Cup title victory, after 2007 and 2024. India were the first team to successfully defend their title to win two consecutive titles, the first tournament hosts to win, and first nation to win three T20 World Cup titles. Suryakumar Yadav became the fourth Indian captain to win a major ICC event after Kapil Dev in 1983; MS Dhoni in 2007, 2011 and 2013; and Rohit Sharma in 2024 and 2025.

India received $2.64 million and New Zealand received $1.42 million in prize money from the ICC. Indian President Droupadi Murmu and Prime Minister Narendra Modi congratulated team India on winning the tournament again. The Board of Control for Cricket in India gave the team a cash reward of ₹131 crore (US$14 million), split between the players and supporting staff.

== Broadcasting ==
The final match was broadcast live in India on Star Sports, free-to-air broadcaster DD Sports and free on the Over-the-top platform JioHotstar. In New Zealand the match was broadcast live on Sky Sport and Sky Sport Now. The match was also broadcast worldwide through ICC.tv and the ICC's official YouTube channel. The final match had a peak of 72.5 million concurrent viewers.

== See also ==
- International cricket in 2025–26
- Associate international cricket in 2025–26
- 2026 Women's T20 World Cup
- 2026 Women's T20 World Cup final
- 2026 Women's T20 World Cup qualification
- 2026 Women's T20 World Cup squads
- International cricket in 2026
- Associate international cricket in 2026
