= Men's T20 World Cup records =

"ICC Men's T20 World Cup" tournament logo

The ICC Men's T20 World Cup, formerly the ICC World Twenty20 (2007–2016), is a biennial world cup for cricket in Twenty20 International (T20I) format, organised by the International Cricket Council (ICC). It was held in every odd year from 2007 to 2009, and since 2010 has been held in every even year with the exception of 2018 and 2020. In 2018, the tournament was rebranded from the World Twenty20 to the T20 World Cup. Until 2016, both men's and women's tournaments were held together; since 2018 both are held separately but in the same calendar year with the exception of 2018 and 2020–2023.

As of the 2026 tournament, Rohit Sharma of India holds the record for most appearances in T20 World Cup matches (47), while MS Dhoni of India holds the record for the most T20 World Cup matches as a captain (33). R. Premadasa Stadium in Colombo, Sri Lanka, has hosted the most T20 World Cup matches (23). Australian umpire Rod Tucker has umpired the most T20 World Cup Cup matches (52). A total of 18 centuries and xxx 100-run partnerships have been scored while, 10 hat-tricks, xx five-wicket hauls and xx four-wicket hauls have been taken in the tournaments. Virat Kohli of India holds the record for most runs (1,292), and Sahibzada Farhan of Pakistan holds the record for most runs in a tournament (383 in 2026). Shakib Al Hasan of Bangladesh holds the record for most wickets (50), and Fazalhaq Farooqi of Afghanistan and Arshdeep Singh of India are tied for most wickets in a tournament (17 in 2024). Quinton de Kock of South Africa holds the record for most dismissals by a wicket-keeper (39) while David Warner of Australia holds the record for most catches by a fielder (25).

== Notation and key ==
Team notation

- (200/3) indicates that a team scored 200 runs for three wickets and the innings was closed, either due to a successful run chase or if no overs remained (or were able) to be bowled.
- (200) indicates that a team scored 200 runs and was all out, either by losing all ten wickets or by having one or more batters unable to bat and losing the remaining wickets.

Batting notation

- (100) indicates that a batter scored 100 runs and was out.
- (100*) indicates that a batter scored 100 runs and was not out.

Bowling notation

- (5/40) indicates that a bowler took five wickets while conceding 40 runs.

Key for statistical terms

- Match aggregate
- Victory margin
- Extra: a run scored by means other than a batter hitting the ball, "b" denotes a bye, "lb" denotes a leg bye, "nb" denotes a no-ball, and "w" denotes a wide.
- Batting average
- Batting strike rate
- Boundary
- Duck:
- Half-century
- Century:
- BBI
- Bowling average
- Bowling economy rate
- Bowling strike rate
- Hat-trick:
- Four-wicket haul (4WI):
- Five-wicket haul (5WI):
- Wicket-keeper dismissal:
- Fielder catch:
- Partnership:

== Team records ==
=== Team performances ===
† denotes current Test playing nations / ICC full members.

Overall team performances in Men's T20 World Cup tournaments
Team (Note: Teams are ordered by their best performance, then winning percentage, then (if equal) by alphabetical order.)	Apps	Mat	Won	Lost	Tied (W/L)	N/R	Win % (Note: Excluding no result matches)	Best performance
India†	10	61	43	16	1 (1/0)	1	73.33	Winners (2007, 2024, 2026)
England†	10	60	34	24	0 (0/0)	2	58.62	Winners (2010, 2022)
West Indies†	10	53	29	22	1 (1/0)	1	57.69	Winners (2012, 2016)
Australia†	10	51	32	19	0 (0/0)	0	62.74	Winners (2021)
Pakistan†	10	58	34	21	2 (0/2)	1	59.64	Winners (2009)
Sri Lanka†	10	61	35	25	1 (1/0)	0	59.01	Winners (2014)
New Zealand†	10	55	30	22	2 (0/2)	1	55.55	Runners-up (2021, 2026)
South Africa†	10	57	38	17	1 (1/0)	1	69.64	Runners-up (2024)
Afghanistan†	8	34	14	19	1 (0/1)	0	41.17	Semi-finals (2024)
Bangladesh†	9	45	12	32	0 (0/0)	1	27.27	Second round (2007, 2014, 2016, 2021, 2022, 2024)
Zimbabwe†	7	26	11	14	0 (0/0)	1	44.00	Second round (2022, 2026)
Netherlands	7	31	11	19	0 (0/0)	1	36.66	Second round (2014, 2022)
Ireland†	9	31	8	20	0 (0/0)	3	28.57	Second round (2009, 2022)
United States	2	10	3	6	1 (1/0)	0	40.00	Second round (2024)
Scotland	7	26	8	16	0 (0/0)	2	33.33	Second round (2021)
Namibia	4	19	4	14	1 (1/0)	0	26.31	Second round (2021)
Oman	4	14	2	10	1 (0/1)	1	15.38	First round (2016, 2021, 2024, 2026)
Nepal	3	10	3	7	0 (0/0)	0	30.00	First round (2014, 2024, 2026)
United Arab Emirates	3	10	2	8	0 (0/0)	0	20.00	First round (2014, 2022, 2026)
Hong Kong	2	6	1	5	0 (0/0)	0	16.66	First round (2014, 2016)
Canada	2	7	1	6	0 (0/0)	0	14.28	First round (2024, 2026)
Papua New Guinea	2	7	0	7	0 (0/0)	0	0.00	First round (2021, 2024)
Italy	1	4	1	3	0 (0/0)	0	25.00	First round (2026)
Uganda	1	4	1	3	0 (0/0)	0	25.00	First round (2024)
Kenya	1	2	0	2	0 (0/0)	0	0.00	First round (2007)
As of 2026 Men's T20 World Cup Source: Cricinfo

=== Innings totals ===
Highest innings totals
Score	Team	Opposition	Date & venue
260/6	Sri Lanka	Kenya	14 September 2007 at Wanderers Stadium, Johannesburg
256/4	India	Zimbabwe	26 February 2026 at M.A. Chidambaram Stadium, Chennai
255/5	India	New Zealand	8 March 2026 at Narendra Modi Stadium, Ahmedabad
254/6	West Indies	Zimbabwe	23 February 2026 at Wankhede Stadium, Mumbai
253/7	India	England	5 March 2026 at Wankhede Stadium, Mumbai

Lowest innings totals
Score	Team	Opposition	Date & venue
39	Netherlands	Sri Lanka	24 March 2014 at Zohur Ahmed Chowdhury Stadium, Chattogram
39	Uganda	West Indies	8 June 2024 at Providence Stadium, Georgetown
40	Uganda	New Zealand	14 June 2024 at Brian Lara Cricket Academy, San Fernando
44	Netherlands	Sri Lanka	22 October 2021 at Sharjah Cricket Stadium, Sharjah
47	Oman	England	13 June 2024 at Sir Vivian Richards Stadium, North Sound

=== Match aggregates ===
Highest match aggregates
Aggregate	Team1	Team2	Date & venue
499/14	India (253/7)	England (246/7)	5 March 2026 at Wankhede Stadium, Mumbai
459/12	South Africa (229/4)	England (230/8)	18 March 2016 at Wankhede Stadium, Mumbai
440/10	India (256/4)	Zimbabwe (184/6)	26 February 2026 at M.A. Chidambaram Stadium, Chennai
419/14	Pakistan (212/8)	Sri Lanka (207/6)	28 February 2026 at Pallekele International Cricket Stadium, Kandy
418/10	India (218/4)	England (200/6)	19 September 2007 at Kingsmead Cricket Ground, Durban

Lowest match aggregates
Aggregate	Team1	Team2	Date & venue
79/11	Netherlands (39)	Sri Lanka (40/1)	24 March 2014 at Zohur Ahmed Chowdhury Stadium, Chattogram
81/11	Uganda (40)	New Zealand (41/1)	14 June 2024 at Brian Lara Cricket Academy, San Fernando
89/12	Netherlands (44)	Sri Lanka (45/2)	22 October 2021 at Sharjah Cricket Stadium, Sharjah
97/12	Oman (47)	England (50/2)	13 June 2024 at Sir Vivian Richards Stadium, North Sound
106/12	Ireland (47/7)	Netherlands (59/5)	13 March 2016 at Himachal Pradesh Cricket Association Stadium, Dharamshala

=== Victory margins (by runs) ===
Largest victory margins (by runs)
Victory margin	Winning team	Score	Opposition	Score	Date & venue
172 runs	Sri Lanka	260/6	Kenya	88	14 September 2007 at Wanderers Stadium, Johannesburg
134 runs	West Indies	173/5	Uganda	39	8 June 2024 at Providence Stadium, Georgetown
130 runs	South Africa	211/5	Scotland	81	7 June 2009 at The Oval, London
130 runs	Afghanistan	190/4	Scotland	60	25 October 2021 at Sharjah Cricket Stadium, Sharjah
125 runs	Afghanistan	183/5	Uganda	58	3 June 2024 at Providence Stadium, Georgetown

=== Most extras ===
Most extras in an innings
Extras	Form	Team	Opposition	Date & venue
28	0 b, 4 lb, 1 nb, 23 w	West Indies	South Africa	11 September 2007 at
26	0 b, 6 lb, 0 nb, 20 w	South Africa	England	18 March 2016 at
25	4 b, 4 lb, 0 nb, 17 w	Zimbabwe	Afghanistan	12 March 2016 at
25	0 b, 12 lb, 0 nb, 13 w	Afghanistan	Papua New Guinea	13 June 2024 at
24	0 b, 9 lb, 0 nb, 15 w	India	South Africa	20 September 2007 at

== Batting records ==
=== Most runs ===
Most runs
Runs	Player	Team	Span
1,292	Virat Kohli	India	2012 – 2024
1,220	Rohit Sharma	India	2007 – 2024
1,100	Jos Buttler	England	2012 – 2026
1,016	Mahela Jayawardene	Sri Lanka	2007 – 2014
984	David Warner	Australia	2009 – 2024

Most runs in a tournament
Runs	Player	Team	Tournament
383	Sahibzada Farhan	Pakistan	2026
326	Tim Seifert	New Zealand	2026
321	Sanju Samson	India	2026
319	Virat Kohli	India	2014
317	2 players		

Most runs in an innings
Runs	Player	Team	Opposition	Date & venue
123	Brendon McCullum	New Zealand	Bangladesh	21 September 2012 at Pallekele International Cricket Stadium, Kandy
117	Chris Gayle	West Indies	South Africa	11 September 2007 at Wanderers Stadium, Johannesburg
116*	Alex Hales	England	Sri Lanka	27 March 2014 at Zohur Ahmed Chowdhury Stadium, Chittagong
111*	Ahmed Shehzad	Pakistan	Bangladesh	30 March 2014 at Sher-e-Bangla National Cricket Stadium, Dhaka
110	Yuvraj Samra	Canada	New Zealand	17 February 2026 at M. A. Chidambaram Stadium, Chennai

=== Batting stats ===
Highest batting averages (Note: Listing criteria: minimum 10 innings)
Average	Player	Team	Span
60.72	Virat Kohli	India	2012 – 2024
54.62	Michael Hussey	Australia	2007 – 2012
50.66	Sherfane Rutherford	West Indies	2024 – 2026
44.61	Kevin Pietersen	England	2007 – 2010
42.75	Tim Seifert	New Zealand	2021 – 2026

Highest batting strike rates (Note: Listing criteria: minimum 200 balls faced)
Strike rate	Player	Team	Span
176.13	Finn Allen	New Zealand	2022 – 2026
162.85	Tim Seifert	New Zealand	2021 – 2026
160.94	Shimron Hetmyer	West Indies	2021 – 2026
160.25	Sahibzada Farhan	Pakistan	2026 – 2026
158.44	Travis Head	Australia	2024 – 2026

=== Boundaries ===
Most sixes
Sixes	Player	Team	Span
63	Chris Gayle	West Indies	2007 – 2021
50	Rohit Sharma	India	2007 – 2024
45	Jos Buttler	England	2012 – 2026
40	David Warner	Australia	2009 – 2024
36	Rahmanullah Gurbaz	Afghanistan	2021 – 2026

Most sixes in an innings
Sixes	Player	Team	Opposition	Date & venue
11	Chris Gayle	West Indies	England	16 March 2016 at Wankhede Stadium, Mumbai
10	Chris Gayle	West Indies	South Africa	11 September 2007 at Wanderers Stadium, Johannesburg
10	Aaron Jones	United States	Canada	1 June 2024 at Grand Prairie Stadium, Dallas
8	7 players			

Most runs from boundaries in an innings
Runs	Boundaries (4s & 6s)	Player	Team	Opposition	Date & venue
88	10 & 8	Finn Allen	New Zealand	South Africa	4 March 2026 at Eden Gardens, Kolkata
88	7 & 10	Chris Gayle	West Indies	South Africa	11 September 2007 at Wanderers Stadium, Johannesburg
86	11 & 7	Brendon McCullum	New Zealand	Bangladesh	21 September 2012 at Pallekele International Cricket Stadium, Kandy
86	5 & 11	Chris Gayle	West Indies	England	16 March 2016 at Wankhede Stadium, Mumbai
80	2 players				

=== Other batting records ===
Most ducks
Ducks	Player	Team	Span
5	Shahid Afridi	Pakistan	2007 – 2016
Tillakaratne Dilshan	Sri Lanka	2007 – 2016	
4	13 players		

Most half-centuries
50+ scores	Player	Team	Span
15	Virat Kohli	India	2012 – 2024
12	Rohit Sharma	India	2007 – 2024
9	Chris Gayle	West Indies	2007 – 2021
8	David Warner	Australia	2009 – 2024
7	2 players		

Most centuries
100+ scores	Player	Team	Span
2	Sahibzada Farhan	Pakistan	2026 – 2026
2	Chris Gayle	West Indies	2007 – 2021
1	14 players		

== Bowling records ==
=== Most wickets ===
Most wickets
Wickets	Player	Team	Span
50	Shakib Al Hasan	Bangladesh	2007 – 2024
44	Adam Zampa	Australia	2016 – 2026
44	Adil Rashid	England	2009 – 2026
43	Rashid Khan	Afghanistan	2016 – 2026
40	2 players		

Most wickets in a tournament
Wickets	Player	Team	Tournament
17	Fazalhaq Farooqi	Afghanistan	2024
17	Arshdeep Singh	India	2024
16	Wanindu Hasaranga	Sri Lanka	2021
15	4 players		

Best bowling figures in an innings
BBI	Player	Team	Opposition	Date & venue
6/8	Ajantha Mendis	Sri Lanka	Zimbabwe	18 September 2012 at Mahinda Rajapaksa International Cricket Stadium, Hambantota
5/3	Rangana Herath	Sri Lanka	New Zealand	31 March 2014 Zohur Ahmed Chowdhury Stadium, Chittagong
5/6	Umar Gul	Pakistan	New Zealand	13 June 2009 at The Oval, London
5/9	Fazalhaq Farooqi	Afghanistan	Uganda	3 June 2024 at Providence Stadium, Georgetown
5/10	Sam Curran	England	Afghanistan	22 October 2022 at Perth Stadium, Perth

=== Bowling stats ===
Best bowling averages (Note: Listing criteria: minimum 250 deliveries)
Average	Player	Team	Span
11.47	Wanindu Hasaranga	Sri Lanka	2021 – 2026
12.00	Anrich Nortje	South Africa	2021 – 2026
12.50	Trent Boult	New Zealand	2014 – 2024
13.26	Tabraiz Shamsi	South Africa	2021 – 2024
13.58	Samuel Badree	West Indies	2012 – 2016

Best bowling economy rates (Note: Listing criteria: minimum 250 deliveries)
Economy	Player	Team	Span
5.17	Sunil Narine	West Indies	2012 – 2014
5.52	Samuel Badree	West Indies	2012 – 2016
5.66	Jasprit Bumrah	India	2016 – 2026
5.71	Anrich Nortje	South Africa	2021 – 2026
5.83	Daniel Vettori	New Zealand	2007 – 2012

Best bowling strike rates (Note: Listing criteria: minimum 250 deliveries)
Strike rate	Player	Team	Span
11.43	Tabraiz Shamsi	South Africa	2016 – 2024
11.45	Wanindu Hasaranga	Sri Lanka	2021 – 2026
11.96	Blessing Muzarabani	Zimbabwe	2022 – 2026
12.23	Fazalhaq Farooqi	Afghanistan	2022 – 2026
12.60	Anrich Nortje	South Africa	2021 – 2026

=== Other bowling records ===
Most runs conceded in an innings
Runs	Player	Team	Opposition	Date & venue
		[[ national cricket team|]]	[[ national cricket team|]]	
		[[ national cricket team|]]	[[ national cricket team|]]	
		[[ national cricket team|]]	[[ national cricket team|]]	
		[[ national cricket team|]]	[[ national cricket team|]]	
		[[ national cricket team|]]	[[ national cricket team|]]	

Most hat-tricks
Hat-tricks	Player	Team	Span
2	Pat Cummins	Australia	2024
1	8 players		

Most four-wicket hauls (and over)
4WI	Player	Team	Span
4	Adam Zampa	Australia	2016 – 2026
3	Anrich Nortje	South Africa	2021 – 2026
3	Saeed Ajmal	Pakistan	2009 – 2014
3	Rashid Khan	Afghanistan	2016 – 2026
3	Shakib Al Hasan	Bangladesh	2007 – 2024

Most five-wicket hauls (and over)
5WI	Player	Team	Span
		[[ national cricket team|]]	
		[[ national cricket team|]]	
		[[ national cricket team|]]	
		[[ national cricket team|]]	
		[[ national cricket team|]]	

== Fielding records ==
=== Wicket-keeper dismissals ===
Most wicket-keeper dismissals
Dismissals	Player	Team	Span
39	Quinton de Kock	South Africa	
32	MS Dhoni	India	
31	Jos Buttler	England	
30	Kamran Akmal	Pakistan	
27	Denesh Ramdin	West Indies	

Most wicket-keeper dismissals in a tournament
Dismissals	Player	Team	Tournament
14	Rishabh Pant	India	2024
10	Usman Khan	Pakistan	2026
9	8 players		

=== Fielder catches ===
Most fielder catches
Catches	Player	Team	Span
25	David Warner	Australia	
23	AB de Villiers	South Africa	
23	Glenn Maxwell	Australia	
21	Rohit Sharma	India	
19	Martin Guptill	New Zealand	

Most fielder catches in a tournament
Catches	Player	Team	Tournament
11	Glenn Phillips	New Zealand	2026
10	Tom Banton	England	2026
9	Dasun Shanaka	Sri Lanka	2022
8	7 players		

== Partnership records ==
Highest partnerships (by runs)
Runs	Wicket	Players		Team	Opposition	Date & venue
176	1st	Sahibzada Farhan	Fakhar Zaman	Pakistan	Sri Lanka	28 February 2026 at Pallekele International Cricket Stadium, Kandy
175*	1st	Tim Seifert	Finn Allen	New Zealand	United Arab Emirates	10 February 2026 at M. A. Chidambaram Stadium, Chennai
170*	1st	Jos Buttler	Alex Hales	England	India	10 November 2022 at Adelaide Oval, Adelaide
168	2nd	Rilee Rossouw	Quinton de Kock	South Africa	Bangladesh	27 October 2022 at Sydney Cricket Ground, Sydney
166	2nd	Mahela Jayawardene	Kumar Sangakkara	Sri Lanka	West Indies	7 May 2010 at Kensington Oval, Bridgetown

Highest partnerships (by wicket)
Wicket	Runs	Players		Team	Opposition	Date & venue
1st	176	Sahibzada Farhan	Fakhar Zaman	Pakistan	Sri Lanka	28 February 2026 at Pallekele International Cricket Stadium, Kandy
2nd	168	Quinton de Kock	Rilee Rossouw	South Africa	Bangladesh	27 October 2022 at Sydney Cricket Ground, Sydney
3rd	152	Alex Hales	Eoin Morgan	England	Sri Lanka	27 March 2014 at Zohur Ahmed Chowdhury Stadium, Chattogram
4th	123	Pathum Nissanka	Wanindu Hasaranga	Sri Lanka	Ireland	20 October 2021 at Sheikh Zayed Cricket Stadium, Abu Dhabi
5th	119*	Shoaib Malik	Misbah-ul-Haq	Pakistan	Australia	18 September 2007 at Wanderers Stadium, Johannesburg
5th	119*	Curtis Campher	George Dockrell	Ireland	Scotland	19 October 2022 at Bellerive Oval, Hobart
6th	101*	Cameron White	Michael Hussey	Australia	Sri Lanka	9 May 2010 at Kensington Oval, Bridgetown
7th	84	Mitchell Santner	Cole McConchie	New Zealand	Sri Lanka	25 February 2026 at R. Premadasa Stadium, Colombo
8th	89	Jason Holder	Romario Shepherd	West Indies	South Africa	26 February 2026 at Narendra Modi Stadium, Ahmedabad
9th	44	Gulbadin Naib	Shapoor Zadran	Afghanistan	England	21 September 2012 at R. Premadasa Stadium, Colombo
10th	44	Brad Evans	Richard Ngarava	Zimbabwe	West Indies	23 February 2026 at Wankhede Stadium, Mumbai

== Other records ==
Most matches played
Matches	Player	Team	Span
47	Rohit Sharma	India	2007 – 2024
43	Jos Buttler	England	2012 – 2026
43	Shakib Al Hasan	Bangladesh	2007 – 2024
41	David Warner	Australia	2009 – 2024
38	Adil Rashid	England	2009 – 2026

Most matches captained
Matches	Player	Team	Span
33	MS Dhoni	India	2007 – 2016
23	Dasun Shanaka	Sri Lanka	2021 – 2026
21	Kane Williamson	New Zealand	2016 – 2024
19	Gerhard Erasmus	Namibia	2021 – 2026
18	Darren Sammy	West Indies	2012 – 2016

Most matches hosted by a ground
Matches	Ground	Country	Span
23	R. Premadasa Stadium, Colombo	Sri Lanka	
20	Kensington Oval, Bridgetown	Barbados, West Indies	
16	Daren Sammy Cricket Ground, Gros Islet	Saint Lucia, West Indies	
15	3 venues		

Most matches umpired
Matches	Umpire	Nationality	Span
52	Rod Tucker	Australia	
45	Aleem Dar	Pakistan	
44	Richard Kettleborough	England	
42	Kumar Dharmasena	Sri Lanka	
34	Richard Illingworth	England	

== Tournament records ==
Records by tournament
Edition	Most runs	Most wickets	Player of the tournament	Ref.
2007	(Australia) Matthew Hayden (265)	(Pakistan) Umar Gul (13)	(Pakistan) Shahid Afridi	
2009	(Sri Lanka) Tillakaratne Dilshan (317)	(Pakistan) Umar Gul (13)	(Sri Lanka) Tillakaratne Dilshan	
2010	(Sri Lanka) Mahela Jayawardene (302)	(Australia) Dirk Nannes (14)	(England) Kevin Pietersen	
2012	(Australia) Shane Watson (249)	(Sri Lanka) Ajantha Mendis (15)	(Australia) Shane Watson	
2014	(India) Virat Kohli (319)	(South Africa) Imran Tahir (12) (Netherlands) Ahsan Malik (12)	(India) Virat Kohli	
2016	(Bangladesh) Tamim Iqbal (295)	(Afghanistan) Mohammad Nabi (12)	(India) Virat Kohli	
2021	(Pakistan) Babar Azam (303)	(Sri Lanka) Wanindu Hasaranga (16)	(Australia) David Warner	
2022	(India) Virat Kohli (296)	(Sri Lanka) Wanindu Hasaranga (15)	(England) Sam Curran	
2024	(Afghanistan) Rahmanullah Gurbaz (281)	(Afghanistan) Fazalhaq Farooqi (17) (India) Arshdeep Singh (17)	(India) Jasprit Bumrah	
2026	(Pakistan) Sahibzada Farhan (383)	(India) Jasprit Bumrah (14) (India) Varun Chakravarthy (14)	(India) Sanju Samson	

== Lists ==
=== 1-run victories ===
List of 1-run margin victories
Winning team	Score	Losing team	Score	Date & venue
South Africa	128/7	New Zealand	127/5 (20 overs)	9 June 2009 at Lord's, London
New Zealand	133/7	Pakistan	132/7	8 May 2010 at Kensington Oval, Bridgetown
India	152/6	South Africa	151	2 October 2012 at R. Premadasa Stadium, Colombo
India	146/7	Bangladesh	145/9	23 March 2016 at M. Chinnaswamy Stadium, Bengaluru
Zimbabwe	130/8	Pakistan	129/8	27 October 2022 at Perth Stadium, Perth
South Africa	115/7	Nepal	114/7	14 June 2024 at Arnos Vale Stadium, Kingstown

=== 10-wicket victories ===
List of 10-wicket margin victories
Winning team	Score	Losing team	Score	Date & venue
Australia	102/0	Sri Lanka	101	20 September 2007 at Newlands Cricket Ground, Cape Town
South Africa	94/0	Zimbabwe	93/8	20 September 2012 at Mahinda Rajapaksa International Cricket Stadium, Hambantota
Oman	131/0	Papua New Guinea	129/9	17 October 2021 at Oman Cricket Academy Ground, Muscat
Pakistan	152/0	India	151/7	24 October 2021 at Dubai International Cricket Stadium, Dubai
England	170/0	India	168/6	10 November 2022 at Adelaide Oval, Adelaide
England	117/0	United States	115	23 June 2024 at Kensington Oval, Bridgetown
New Zealand	175/0	United Arab Emirates	173/6	10 February 2026 at M. A. Chidambaram Stadium, Chennai
Italy	124/0	Nepal	123	12 February 2026 at Wankhede Stadium, Mumbai

=== Hat-tricks ===
As of the 2026 tournament, a total of 10 hat-tricks have been taken in the T20 World Cups by 9 players from 7 teams. Pat Cummins of Australia is the only player to have taken multiple hat-tricks (2 in 2024), while Australia (Brett Lee in 2007 and Cummins) and Ireland (Curtis Campher in 2021 and Josh Little in 2022) are the only teams to have multiple players take hat-tricks.

=== Four-wicket hauls ===
List of four-wicket hauls
Player	Figures	Team	Opposition	Dismissed players	Date & venue	Result

=== 100-run partnerships ===
List of 100-run partnerships
Runs	Wicket	Players	Team	Opposition	Date & venue

== See also ==
- Women's T20 World Cup
- Women's T20 World Cup tournaments
- Women's T20 World Cup Global Qualifier
- Women's T20 World Cup records
  - List of Women's T20 World Cup centuries
  - List of Women's T20 World Cup five-wicket hauls
