= List of Men's T20 World Cup centuries =

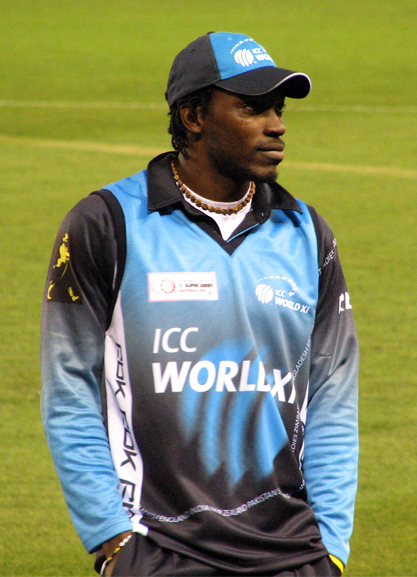
Chris Gayle is the first player to score a century in the Men's T20 World Cup.

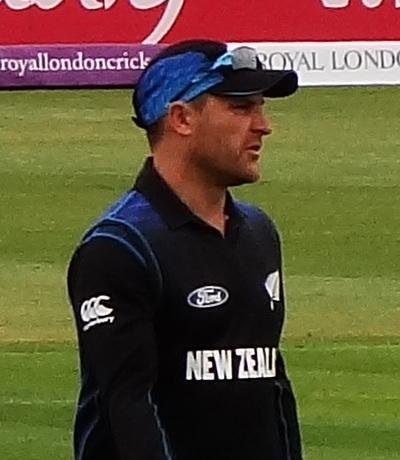
Brendon McCullum is the highest individual scorer in the Men's T20 World Cup, having scored 123 runs against Bangladesh.

The ICC Men's T20 World Cup is the international championship of Twenty20 (T20) cricket. A Twenty20 International (T20I) is an international cricket match between two teams, each having T20I status, as determined by the International Cricket Council (ICC), the sport's world governing body. In a T20I, each team plays single innings, which is restricted to a maximum of 20 overs. In cricket, a player is said to have completed a century when he scores 100 or more runs in a single innings. As of the 2026 ICC Men's T20 World Cup, the most recent to take place, sixteen batsmen have scored eighteen centuries in the ICC Men's T20 World Cup.

The first century in an ICC Men's T20 World Cup match was scored by Chris Gayle of the West Indies. He achieved the feat in the inaugural match of the first Men's T20 World Cup (then called the World Twenty20) against the hosts South Africa on 11 September 2007. He scored 117 runs in 57 balls at Wanderers Stadium, Johannesburg. This century also made him the first player to score a century in all three formats of international cricket. With his two centuries, he remains one of only two batsmen to have scored more than one century in the championship, along with Sahibzada Farhan of Pakistan. Gayle's 117 runs remained the highest individual score in the Men's T20 World Cup for almost five years until Brendon McCullum of New Zealand broke it during the 2012 edition. He scored 123 runs in 58 balls against Bangladesh at Pallekele Stadium, Kandy, on 21 September 2012. The second and third batsmen to score a century in the championship were Suresh Raina of India and Mahela Jayawardene of Sri Lanka respectively, both during the 2010 ICC Men's T20 World Cup. Their respective centuries helped them to achieve the feat of scoring a century in all the international formats of the game, only previously achieved by Gayle and McCullum. (Note: Brendon McCullum achieved the feat when he scored his first T20I century against Australia at AMI Stadium, Christchurch during the 2010 Australia tour of New Zealand on 28 February 2010.)

== Key ==
Symbol	Description
Runs	denotes the number of runs scored by the player
Balls	denotes the number of balls faced by the player
Inns.	denotes the particular innings in which the century was scored
4s	denotes number of fours scored
6s	denotes number of sixes scored
S/R	denotes strike rate (runs scored per 100 balls)
Edition	refers to the edition of the Men's T20 World Cup
Result	refers to whether the player's team won or lost
D/L	refers to result of the match achieved through the Duckworth–Lewis–Stern method
*	denotes that the batsman was not out
#	denotes the score is the highest individual score in the Men's T20 World Cup
‡	denotes the score is the fastest century in the Men's T20 World Cup

== Centuries ==
List of Men's T20 World Cup centuries
No.	Player	Runs	Balls	4s	6s	S/R	Inns.	Team	Opposition	Venue	Edition	Date	Result	Ref
1	Chris Gayle (1/2)	117 †	57	7	10	205.26	1	West Indies	South Africa	Wanderers Stadium, Johannesburg	2007	11 September 2007	Lost	
2	Suresh Raina	101	60	9	5	168.33	1	India	South Africa	Beausejour Stadium, Gros Islet	2010	2 May 2010	Won	
3	Mahela Jayawardene	100	64	10	4	156.25	1	Sri Lanka	Zimbabwe	Providence Stadium, Providence	2010	3 May 2010	Won (D/L)	
4	Brendon McCullum	123 #	58	11	7	212.06	1	New Zealand	Bangladesh	Pallekele International Cricket Stadium, Kandy	2012	21 September 2012	Won	
5	Alex Hales	116*	64	11	6	181.25	2	England	Sri Lanka	Zohur Ahmed Chowdhury Stadium, Chittagong	2014	27 March 2014	Won	
6	Ahmed Shehzad	111* (Note: Shehzad's century helped him to become the first player from Pakistan to achieve the feat of scoring a century in all three international formats of the game.)	62	10	5	179.03	1	Pakistan	Bangladesh	Sher-e-Bangla National Cricket Stadium, Dhaka	2014	30 March 2014	Won	
7	Tamim Iqbal	103* (Note: Iqbal's century helped him to become the first player from Bangladesh to achieve the feat of scoring a century in all three international formats of the game.)	63	10	5	163.49	1	Bangladesh	Oman	HPCA Stadium, Dharamshala	2016	13 March 2016	Won (D/L)	
8	Chris Gayle (2/2)	100*	48	5	11	208.33	2	West Indies	England	Wankhede Stadium, Mumbai	2016	16 March 2016	Won	
9	Jos Buttler	101* (Note: Buttler's century helped him to become the first player from England to achieve the feat of scoring a century in all three international formats of the game.)	67	6	6	150.74	1	England	Sri Lanka	Sharjah Cricket Stadium, Sharjah	2021	1 November 2021	Won	
10	Rilee Rossouw	109	56	7	8	194.64	1	South Africa	Bangladesh	Sydney Cricket Ground, Sydney	2022	27 October 2022	Won	
11	Glenn Phillips	104	64	10	4	162.50	1	New Zealand	Sri Lanka	Sydney Cricket Ground, Sydney	2022	29 October 2022	Won	
12	Pathum Nissanka	100*	52	10	5	192.30	2	Sri Lanka	Australia	Pallekele International Cricket Stadium, Kandy	2026	16 February 2026	Won	
13	Yuvraj Samra	110	65	11	6	169.23	1	Canada	New Zealand	M. A. Chidambaram Stadium, Chennai	2026	17 February 2026	Lost	
14	Sahibzada Farhan (1/2)	100*	58	11	4	172.41	1	Pakistan	Namibia	SSC Cricket Ground, Colombo	2026	18 February 2026	Won	
15	Harry Brook	100	51	10	4	196.08	2	England	Pakistan	Pallekele International Cricket Stadium, Kandy	2026	24 February 2026	Won	
16	Sahibzada Farhan (2/2)	100	60	9	5	166.67	1	Pakistan	Sri Lanka	Pallekele International Cricket Stadium, Kandy	2026	28 February 2026	Won	
17	Finn Allen	100* ‡	33	10	8	303.03	2	New Zealand	South Africa	Eden Gardens, Kolkata	2026	4 March 2026	Won	
18	Jacob Bethell	105	48	8	7	218.75	2	England	India	Wankhede Stadium, Mumbai	2026	5 March 2026	Lost	

== See also ==
- List of Cricket World Cup centuries
- List of centuries in women's Twenty20 International cricket
