= Hub Sports =

Network of Singaporean sports channels

Hub Sports is a network of four Singaporean sports channels owned by StarHub TV and available on its platform. The channels date back to 1997.

== History ==
The network's origins trace back to 1997, when Singapore CableVision spent SG$500,000 worth of rights for the coverage of high- and lower-tier English football, culminating in the launch of the Football Channel on 9 August. A second channel, SuperSports, was announced in December 1999, with non-football events making up most of its schedule. The channel broadcast from 7pm to midnight on weekdays and 2pm to midnight on weekends, with enlarged periods pending for certain events. The channel had already secured the rights to the Australian Open and Roland Garros. Its broadcasts started on 15 January 2000, in line with the start of the 2000 Australian Open.

On 15 August 2014, all of StarHub's sports channels were uniformised under the SuperSports brand.

On September 30, 2018, Hub Sports gained the rights to air the UEFA Champions League and the UEFA Europa League.

In July 2024, Hub Sports regained the right to broadcast the FA Cup. Hub Sports 3, up until then a golf channel, was converted from a full-time channel to a pop-up channel at the same time.
