= Women's T20 World Cup tournaments =

"ICC Women's T20 World Cup" tournament logo

The ICC Women's T20 World Cup, formerly the ICC Women's World Twenty20 (2009–2018), is a biennial world cup for women's cricket in Women's Twenty20 International (WT20I) format, organised by the International Cricket Council (ICC). It was inaugurated in 2009, and since 2010 has been held in every even year with the exception of 2022. In 2018, the tournament was rebranded from the World Twenty20 to the T20 World Cup. Until 2016, both men's and women's tournaments were held together; since 2018 both are held separately but in the same calendar year with the exception of 2018 and 2020–2023.

As of the 2026 tournament, thirteen nations have played in the T20 World Cup. Eight teams have competed in every tournament, four of which have won the title. Australia are the most successful team with seven titles. England, New Zealand and the West Indies have won the title once each. Australia have made eight final appearances and ten semi-final appearances. Australia and England are the only nations to have won the tournament as the hosts (2020 and 2009 respectively), while Australia are the only nation to have defended their title in the following editions (2012, 2014, 2020 and 2023). Australia also have the highest victory percentage in T20 World Cup matches (83.92%).

== List of tournaments ==
Details of Women's T20 World Cup tournaments
| # | Year | Dates | Host(s) | Venues | Teams | Matches | Attendance | Ref. |
|---|---|---|---|---|---|---|---|---|
| 1 | 2009 | 11 June – 21 June 2009 | England and Wales Cricket Board | 4 in England | 8 | 15 | —N/a | |
| 2 | 2010 | 5 – 16 May 2010 | Cricket West Indies | 3 in the West Indies | 8 | 15 | —N/a | |
| 3 | 2012 | 26 September – 7 October 2012 | Sri Lanka Cricket | 4 in Sri Lanka | 8 | 17 | —N/a | |
| 4 | 2014 | 23 March – 6 April 2014 | Bangladesh Cricket Board | 2 in Bangladesh | 10 | 27 | —N/a | |
| 5 | 2016 | 15 March – 3 April 2016 | Board of Control for Cricket in India | 8 in India | 10 | 23 | —N/a | |
| 6 | 2018 | 9 – 24 November 2018 | Cricket West Indies | 3 in the West Indies | 10 | 23 | —N/a | |
| 7 | 2020 | 21 February – 8 March 2020 | Cricket Australia | 6 in Australia | 10 | 23 | 136,549 | |
| 8 | 2023 | 10 – 26 February 2023 | Cricket South Africa | 3 in South Africa | 10 | 23 | 69,914 | |
| 9 | 2024 | 3 – 20 October 2024 | Bangladesh Cricket Board | 2 in the United Arab Emirates | 10 | 23 | 91,030 | |
| 10 | 2026 | 12 June – 5 July 2026 | England and Wales Cricket Board | 7 in England | 12 | 33 | 245,815 | |
| 11 | 2028 | TBA | Pakistan Cricket Board | TBA | 12 | 33 | | |

=== Final results ===
Details of Women's T20 World Cup finals
| Year | Final | | | | Ref. |
| Year | Date & Venue | Winner | Victory margin | Runner-up | Ref. |
|---|---|---|---|---|---|
| 2009 | 21 June 2009; Lord's, London | England; 86/4 (17 overs) | 6 wickets | New Zealand; 85 (20 overs) | |
| 2010 | 16 May 2010; Kensington Oval, Bridgetown | Australia; 106/8 (20 overs) | 3 runs | New Zealand; 103/6 (20 overs) | |
| 2012 | 7 October 2012; R. Premadasa Stadium, Colombo | Australia; 142/4 (20 overs) | 4 runs | England; 138/9 (20 overs) | |
| 2014 | 6 April 2014; Sher-e-Bangla National Cricket Stadium, Dhaka | Australia; 106/4 (15.1 overs) | 6 wickets | England; 105/8 (20 overs) | |
| 2016 | 3 April 2016; Eden Gardens, Kolkata | West Indies; 149/2 (19.3 overs) | 8 wickets | Australia; 148/5 (20 overs) | |
| 2018 | 24 November 2018; Sir Vivian Richards Stadium, North Sound | Australia; 106/2 (15.1 overs) | 8 wickets | England; 105 (19.4 overs) | |
| 2020 | 8 March 2020; Melbourne Cricket Ground, Melbourne | Australia; 184/4 (20 overs) | 85 runs | India; 99 (19.1 overs) | |
| 2023 | 26 February 2023; Newlands Cricket Ground, Cape Town | Australia; 156/6 (20 overs) | 19 runs | South Africa; 137/6 (20 overs) | |
| 2024 | 20 October 2024; Dubai International Cricket Stadium, Dubai | New Zealand; 158/5 (20 overs) | 32 runs | South Africa; 126/9 (20 overs) | |
| 2026 | 5 July 2026; Lord's, London | Australia; 153/3 (17.1 overs) | 7 wickets | England; 150/4 (20 overs) | |

== Debutant teams by tournament ==
† denotes Test playing nations / ICC full members at that time.

Debutant teams in each Women's T20 World Cup tournament
| Year | Debutant teams | | | Total |
|---|---|---|---|---|
| 2009 | Australia† | England† | India† | 8 |
| 2009 | New Zealand† | | Pakistan† | 8 |
| 2009 | South Africa† | Sri Lanka† | West Indies† | 8 |
| 2010 | —N/a | | | 0 |
| 2012 | —N/a | | | 0 |
| 2014 | Bangladesh† | | Ireland | 2 |
| 2016 | —N/a | | | 0 |
| 2018 | —N/a | | | 0 |
| 2020 | Thailand | | | 1 |
| 2023 | —N/a | | | 0 |
| 2024 | Scotland | | | 1 |
| 2026 | Netherlands | | | 1 |
| 2028 | TBA | | | TBA |
| Total | | | | 13 |

== Team performances ==
=== By tournament ===
An overview of the teams' performances in every T20 World Cup is given below.

Legend

- W Winners
- RU Runners-up
- SF Semi-finalist
- R1 Preliminary round (group stage)
- Q Qualified
- * Hosts

† denotes current Test playing nations / ICC full members.

Team performances in each Women's T20 World Cup tournament
| Edition (No. of teams) | 2009 (8) | 2010 (8) | 2012 (8) | 2014 (10) | 2016 (10) | 2018 (10) | 2020 (10) | 2023 (10) | 2024 (10) | 2026 (12) | 2028 (12) | Apps |
| Location(s) Team | (England) | (Cricket West Indies) | (Sri Lanka) | (Bangladesh) | (India) | (Cricket West Indies) | (Australia) | (South Africa) | (United Arab Emirates) | (England) | (Pakistan) (To be determined) | Apps |
|---|---|---|---|---|---|---|---|---|---|---|---|---|
| Australia† | SF | W | W | W | RU | W | W* | W | SF | W | Q | 10 |
| Bangladesh† | —N/a | —N/a | —N/a | R1* | R1 | R1 | R1 | R1 | R1* | R1 | Q | 7 |
| England† | W* | R1 | RU | RU | SF | RU | SF | SF | R1 | RU* | Q | 10 |
| India† | SF | SF | R1 | R1 | R1* | SF | RU | SF | R1 | R1 | Q | 10 |
| Ireland† (Note: Ireland became a full member in June 2017.) | —N/a | —N/a | —N/a | R1 | R1 | R1 | —N/a | R1 | —N/a | R1 | Q | 5 |
| Netherlands | —N/a | —N/a | —N/a | —N/a | —N/a | —N/a | —N/a | —N/a | —N/a | R1 | | 1 |
| New Zealand† | RU | RU | SF | R1 | SF | R1 | R1 | R1 | W | R1 | Q | 10 |
| Pakistan† | R1 | R1 | R1 | R1 | R1 | R1 | R1 | R1 | R1 | R1 | Q* | 10 |
| Scotland | —N/a | —N/a | —N/a | —N/a | —N/a | —N/a | —N/a | —N/a | R1 | R1 | | 2 |
| South Africa† | R1 | R1 | R1 | SF | R1 | R1 | SF | RU* | RU | SF | Q | 10 |
| Sri Lanka† | R1 | R1 | R1* | R1 | R1 | R1 | R1 | R1 | R1 | R1 | Q | 10 |
| Thailand | —N/a | —N/a | —N/a | —N/a | —N/a | —N/a | R1 | —N/a | —N/a | —N/a | | 1 |
| West Indies† | R1 | SF* | SF | SF | W | SF* | R1 | R1 | SF | SF | Q | 10 |
| Ref. | | | | | | | | | | | | |

=== Overall ===
The table below provides a summary of the performances of teams over past T20 World Cups.

† denotes current Test playing nations / ICC full members.

Overall team performances in Women's T20 World Cup tournaments
| Team (Note: Teams are ordered by their best performance, then winning percentage, then (if equal) by alphabetical order.) | Apps | Mat | Won | Lost | Tied (W/L) | N/R | Win % (Note: Excluding no result matches) | Best performance |
|---|---|---|---|---|---|---|---|---|
| Australia† | 10 | 56 | 46 | 9 | 1 (1/0) | 0 | 83.92 | Winners (2010, 2012, 2014, 2018, 2020, 2023, 2026) |
| England† | 10 | 49 | 37 | 11 | 1 (0/1) | 0 | 75.51 | Winners (2009) |
| New Zealand† | 10 | 47 | 31 | 16 | 0 (0/0) | 0 | 65.95 | Winners (2024) |
| West Indies† | 10 | 45 | 26 | 19 | 0 (0/0) | 0 | 57.77 | Winners (2016) |
| South Africa† | 10 | 45 | 22 | 23 | 0 (0/0) | 0 | 48.88 | Runners-up (2023, 2024) |
| India† | 10 | 45 | 25 | 20 | 0 (0/0) | 0 | 55.55 | Runners-up (2020) |
| Sri Lanka† | 10 | 40 | 13 | 27 | 0 (0/0) | 0 | 32.50 | First round (2009, 2010, 2012, 2014, 2016, 2018, 2020, 2023, 2024, 2026) |
| Pakistan† | 10 | 41 | 10 | 30 | 0 (0/0) | 1 | 25.00 | First round (2009, 2010, 2012, 2014, 2016, 2018, 2020, 2023, 2024, 2026) |
| Bangladesh† | 7 | 30 | 5 | 25 | 0 (0/0) | 0 | 16.66 | First round (2014, 2016, 2018, 2020, 2023, 2024, 2026) |
| Ireland† | 5 | 22 | 1 | 21 | 0 (0/0) | 0 | 4.54 | First round (2014, 2016, 2018, 2023, 2026) |
| Scotland | 2 | 9 | 1 | 8 | 0 (0/0) | 0 | 11.11 | First round (2024, 2026) |
| Netherlands | 1 | 5 | 0 | 5 | 0 (0/0) | 0 | 0.00 | First round (2026) |
| Thailand | 1 | 4 | 0 | 3 | 0 (0/0) | 0 | 0.00 | First round (2020) |
As of 2026 Women's T20 World Cup Source: Cricinfo

== See also ==
- Men's T20 World Cup
- Men's T20 World Cup tournaments
- Men's T20 World Cup qualification
  - Men's T20 World Cup Global Qualifier
- Men's T20 World Cup records
  - List of Men's T20 World Cup centuries
  - List of Men's T20 World Cup five-wicket hauls
  - List of Men's T20 World Cup hat-tricks
