= Men's T20 World Cup tournaments =

"ICC Men's T20 World Cup" tournament logo

The ICC Men's T20 World Cup, formerly the ICC World Twenty20 (2007–2016), is a biennial world cup for cricket in Twenty20 International (T20I) format, organised by the International Cricket Council (ICC). It was held in every odd year from 2007 to 2009, and since 2010 has been held in every even year with the exception of 2018 and 2020. In 2018, the tournament was rebranded from the World Twenty20 to the T20 World Cup. Until 2016, both men's and women's tournaments were held together; since 2018 both are held separately but in the same calendar year with the exception of 2018 and 2020–2023.

As of the 2026 tournament, twenty-five nations have played in the T20 World Cup. Eight teams have competed in every tournament, six of which have won the title. India has won the title three times. England and the West Indies have won the title twice each, while Australia, Pakistan, and Sri Lanka have won the title once each. India has made four final appearances, while England, India and Pakistan have each made six semi-final appearances. India is the only nation to have won the tournament as the hosts and defended their title in the following edition (both in 2026). India also have the highest victory percentage in T20 World Cup matches (73.33%).

== List of tournaments ==
Details of Men's T20 World Cup tournaments
#	Year	Dates	Host(s)	Venues	Teams	Matches	Attendance	Ref.
1	2007	11 – 24 September 2007	Cricket South Africa	3 in South Africa	12	27	—N/a	
2	2009	5 – 21 June 2009	England and Wales Cricket Board	3 in England	12	27	—N/a	
3	2010	30 April – 16 May 2010	Cricket West Indies	3 in the West Indies	12	27	—N/a	
4	2012	18 September – 7 October 2012	Sri Lanka Cricket	3 in Sri Lanka	12	27	—N/a	
5	2014	16 March – 6 April 2014	Bangladesh Cricket Board	3 in Bangladesh	16	35	—N/a	
6	2016	8 March – 3 April 2016	Board of Control for Cricket in India	7 in India	16	35	—N/a	
7	2021	17 October – 14 November 2021	Board of Control for Cricket in India	3 in the United Arab Emirates; 1 in Oman	16	45	378,895	
8	2022	16 October – 13 November 2022	Cricket Australia	7 in Australia	16	45	751,775	
9	2024	1 – 29 June 2024	Cricket West Indies; USA Cricket	6 in the West Indies; 3 in the United States	20	55	190,000+ (Note: Over 190,000 in US alone.) (Note: Exact attendance figures are unknown.)	
10	2026	7 February – 8 March 2026	Board of Control for Cricket in India; Sri Lanka Cricket	5 in India; 3 in Sri Lanka	20	55	1.2 million+	
11	2028	21 October – 19 November 2028	Cricket Australia; New Zealand Cricket	TBA	20	55		

=== Final results ===
Details of Men's T20 World Cup finals
Year	Final				Ref.
Year	Date & Venue	Winner	Victory margin	Runner-up	Ref.
2007	24 September 2007; Wanderers Stadium, Johannesburg	India; 157/5 (20 overs)	5 runs	Pakistan; 152 (19.4 overs)	
2009	21 June 2009; Lord's, London	Pakistan; 139/2 (18.4 overs)	8 wickets	Sri Lanka; 138/6 (20 overs)	
2010	16 May 2010; Kensington Oval, Bridgetown	England; 148/3 (17 overs)	7 wickets	Australia; 147/6 (20 overs)	
2012	7 October 2012; R. Premadasa Stadium, Colombo	West Indies; 137/6 (20 overs)	36 runs	Sri Lanka; 101 (18.4 overs)	
2014	6 April 2014; Sher-e-Bangla National Cricket Stadium, Dhaka	Sri Lanka; 134/4 (17.5 overs)	6 wickets	India; 130/4 (20 overs)	
2016	3 April 2016; Eden Gardens, Kolkata	West Indies; 161/6 (19.4 overs)	4 wickets	England; 155/9 (20 overs)	
2021	14 November 2021; Dubai International Cricket Stadium, Dubai	Australia; 173/2 (18.5 overs)	8 wickets	New Zealand; 172/4 (20 overs)	
2022	13 November 2022; Melbourne Cricket Ground, Melbourne	England; 138/5 (19 overs)	5 wickets	Pakistan; 137/8 (20 overs)	
2024	29 June 2024; Kensington Oval, Bridgetown	India; 176/7 (20 overs)	7 runs	South Africa; 169/8 (20 overs)	
2026	8 March 2026; Narendra Modi Stadium, Ahmedabad	India; 255/5 (20 overs)	96 runs	New Zealand; 159 (19 overs)	
2028	19 November 2028; Melbourne Cricket Ground, Melbourne	To be determined	TBD	To be determined	

== Debutant teams by tournament ==
† denotes Test playing nations / ICC full members at that time.

Debutant teams in each Men's T20 World Cup tournament
Year	Debutant teams			Total
2007	Australia†	Bangladesh†	England†	12
2007	India†	Kenya	New Zealand†	12
2007	Pakistan†	Scotland	Sri Lanka†	12
2007	South Africa†	West Indies†	Zimbabwe†	12
2009	Ireland	Netherlands		2
2010	Afghanistan			1
2012	—N/a			0
2014	Hong Kong	Nepal	United Arab Emirates	3
2016	Oman			1
2021	Namibia	Papua New Guinea		2
2022	—N/a			0
2024	Canada	Uganda	United States	3
2026	Italy			1
2028	TBA			TBA
Total				25

== Team performances ==
A map showing nations that have competed in T20 World Cup tournaments as of the 2026 tournament.

=== By tournament ===
An overview of the teams' performances in every T20 World Cup is given below.

Legend

- W Winners
- RU Runners-up
- SF Semi-finalist
- R2 Second round (Super 8/10/12)
- R1 Preliminary round (group stage)
- Q Qualified
- × Withdrew
- ×× Ineligible (suspended)
- * Hosts

† denotes current Test playing nations / ICC full members.

Team performances in each Men's T20 World Cup tournament
Edition (No. of teams)	2007 (12)	2009 (12)	2010 (12)	2012 (12)	2014 (16)	2016 (16)	2021 (16)	2022 (16)	2024 (20)	2026 (20)	2028 (20)	Apps
Location(s) Team	(South Africa)	(England)	(Cricket West Indies)	(Sri Lanka)	(Bangladesh)	(India)	(United Arab Emirates) (Oman)	(Australia)	(Cricket West Indies) (United States)	(India) (Sri Lanka)	(Australia) (New Zealand)	Apps
Afghanistan† (Note: Afghanistan and Ireland became full members in June 2017.)	—N/a	—N/a	R1	R1	R1	R2	R2	R2	SF	R1	Q	8
Australia†	SF	R1	RU	SF	R2	R2	W	R2*	R2	R1	Q*	10
Bangladesh†	R2	R1	R1	R1	R2*	R2	R2	R2	R2	× (Note: Bangladesh refused to travel to India to play in the 2026 T20 World Cup and were replaced by Scotland.)	Q	9
Canada	—N/a	—N/a	—N/a	—N/a	—N/a	—N/a	—N/a	—N/a	R1	R1		2
England†	R2	R2*	W	R2	R2	RU	SF	W	SF	SF	Q	10
Hong Kong	—N/a	—N/a	—N/a	—N/a	R1	R1	—N/a	—N/a	—N/a	—N/a		2
India†	W	R2	R2	R2	RU	SF*	R2*	SF	W	W*	Q	10
Ireland†	—N/a	R2	R1	R1	R1	R1	R1	R2	R1	R1	Q	9
Italy	—N/a	—N/a	—N/a	—N/a	—N/a	—N/a	—N/a	—N/a	—N/a	R1		1
Kenya	R1	—N/a	—N/a	—N/a	—N/a	—N/a	—N/a	—N/a	—N/a	—N/a		1
Namibia	—N/a	—N/a	—N/a	—N/a	—N/a	—N/a	R2	R1	R1	R1		4
Nepal	—N/a	—N/a	—N/a	—N/a	R1	—N/a	—N/a	—N/a	R1	R1		3
Netherlands	—N/a	R1	—N/a	—N/a	R2	R1	R1	R2	R1	R1		7
New Zealand†	SF	R2	R2	R2	R2	SF	RU	SF	R1	RU	Q*	10
Oman	—N/a	—N/a	—N/a	—N/a	—N/a	R1	R1	—N/a	R1	R1		4
Pakistan†	RU	W	SF	SF	R2	R2	SF	RU	R1	R2	Q	10
Papua New Guinea	—N/a	—N/a	—N/a	—N/a	—N/a	—N/a	R1	—N/a	R1	—N/a		2
Scotland	R1	R1	—N/a	—N/a	—N/a	R1	R2	R1	R1	R1		7
South Africa†	R2*	SF	R2	R2	SF	R2	R2	R2	RU	SF	Q	10
Sri Lanka†	R2	RU	SF	RU*	W	R2	R2	R2	R1	R2*	Q	10
United Arab Emirates	—N/a	—N/a	—N/a	—N/a	R1	—N/a	—N/a	R1	—N/a	R1		3
Uganda	—N/a	—N/a	—N/a	—N/a	—N/a	—N/a	—N/a	—N/a	R1	—N/a		1
United States	—N/a	—N/a	—N/a	—N/a	—N/a	—N/a	—N/a	—N/a	R2*	R1		2
West Indies†	R1	SF	R2*	W	SF	W	R2	R1	R2*	R2	Q	10
Zimbabwe†	R1	× (Note: Zimbabwe withdrew from the 2009 World Twenty20 due to the political issues related to Robert Mugabe and were replaced by a third team from the Global Qualifier: Scotland.)	R1	R1	R1	R1	×× (Note: Zimbabwe was suspended from July to October 2019 by the ICC due to government interference and Nigeria replaced them in the 2019 Global Qualifier.)	R2	—N/a	R2	Q	7
Ref.												

=== Overall ===
The table below provides a summary of the performances of teams over past T20 World Cups.

† denotes current Test playing nations / ICC full members.

Overall team performances in Men's T20 World Cup tournaments
Team (Note: Teams are ordered by their best performance, then winning percentage, then (if equal) by alphabetical order.)	Apps	Mat	Won	Lost	Tied (W/L)	N/R	Win % (Note: Excluding no result matches)	Best performance
India†	10	61	43	16	1 (1/0)	1	73.33	Winners (2007, 2024, 2026)
England†	10	60	34	24	0 (0/0)	2	58.62	Winners (2010, 2022)
West Indies†	10	53	29	22	1 (1/0)	1	57.69	Winners (2012, 2016)
Australia†	10	51	32	19	0 (0/0)	0	62.74	Winners (2021)
Pakistan†	10	58	34	21	2 (0/2)	1	59.64	Winners (2009)
Sri Lanka†	10	61	35	25	1 (1/0)	0	59.01	Winners (2014)
New Zealand†	10	55	30	22	2 (0/2)	1	55.55	Runners-up (2021, 2026)
South Africa†	10	57	38	17	1 (1/0)	1	69.64	Runners-up (2024)
Afghanistan†	8	34	14	19	1 (0/1)	0	41.17	Semi-finals (2024)
Bangladesh†	9	45	12	32	0 (0/0)	1	27.27	Second round (2007, 2014, 2016, 2021, 2022, 2024)
Zimbabwe†	7	26	11	14	0 (0/0)	1	44.00	Second round (2022, 2026)
Netherlands	7	31	11	19	0 (0/0)	1	36.66	Second round (2014, 2022)
Ireland†	9	31	8	20	0 (0/0)	3	28.57	Second round (2009, 2022)
United States	2	10	3	6	1 (1/0)	0	40.00	Second round (2024)
Scotland	7	26	8	16	0 (0/0)	2	33.33	Second round (2021)
Namibia	4	19	4	14	1 (1/0)	0	26.31	Second round (2021)
Oman	4	14	2	10	1 (0/1)	1	15.38	First round (2016, 2021, 2024, 2026)
Nepal	3	10	3	7	0 (0/0)	0	30.00	First round (2014, 2024, 2026)
United Arab Emirates	3	10	2	8	0 (0/0)	0	20.00	First round (2014, 2022, 2026)
Hong Kong	2	6	1	5	0 (0/0)	0	16.66	First round (2014, 2016)
Canada	2	7	1	6	0 (0/0)	0	14.28	First round (2024, 2026)
Papua New Guinea	2	7	0	7	0 (0/0)	0	0.00	First round (2021, 2024)
Italy	1	4	1	3	0 (0/0)	0	25.00	First round (2026)
Uganda	1	4	1	3	0 (0/0)	0	25.00	First round (2024)
Kenya	1	2	0	2	0 (0/0)	0	0.00	First round (2007)
As of 2026 Men's T20 World Cup Source: Cricinfo

== See also ==
- Women's T20 World Cup
- Women's T20 World Cup tournaments
- Women's T20 World Cup Global Qualifier
- Women's T20 World Cup records
  - List of Women's T20 World Cup centuries
  - List of Women's T20 World Cup five-wicket hauls
