= List of Men's T20 World Cup hat-tricks =

The ICC Men's T20 World Cup, formerly the ICC World Twenty20, is a biennial international Twenty20 International (T20I) cricket tournament organised by the International Cricket Council (ICC). It was held in every odd year from 2007 to 2009, and since 2010 has been held in every even year with the exception of 2018 and 2020. In a T20I, each team plays single innings, which is restricted to a maximum of 20 overs. In cricket, a bowler is said to have taken a hat-trick if he takes three wickets from three consecutive deliveries. The deliveries may be interrupted by another over bowled by another bowler. As of the most recent edition, the 2026 ICC Men's T20 World Cup, nine bowlers have taken a hat-trick in a ICC Men's T20 World Cup match. Brett Lee is the first bowler to take a hat-trick in a T20 World Cup, against Bangladesh in the inaugural 2007 edition. Pat Cummins is the only bowler to have taken more than one hat-trick in T20 World Cups, with two in back to back games in the 2024 Men's T20 World Cup against Bangladesh and Afghanistan, in doing so also becoming the first Australian since Brett Lee to achieve the feat. Curtis Campher is the only bowler to have dismissed four batsmen with four consecutive deliveries in a T20 World Cup, against the Netherlands in 2021, also becoming the third bowler in all T20Is to do so. As of the 2026 edition, Romario Shepherd is the latest bowler to have taken a T20 World Cup hat-trick, doing so against Scotland in 2026.

== Key ==
Symbol	Description
Date	refers to the date of the match
Inns	refers to the innings in which the hat-trick was completed
Edition	refers to the edition of the Men's T20 World Cup
Result	refers to whether the bowler's team won or lost
Batsmen	refers to the batsmen dismissed as a result of the hat-trick

== Hat-tricks ==
ICC Men's T20 World Cup hat-tricks
No.	Bowler	Date	Team	Opponent	Venue	Inn	Batsmen	Result
1	Brett Lee	16 September 2007	Australia	Bangladesh	Newlands Cricket Ground, Cape Town	1	Shakib Al Hasan; Mashrafe Mortaza; Alok Kapali	Won
2	Curtis Campher	18 October 2021	Ireland	Netherlands	Zayed Cricket Stadium, Abu Dhabi	1	Colin Ackermann; Ryan ten Doeschate; Scott Edwards; Roelof van der Merwe	Won
3	Wanindu Hasaranga	29 October 2021	Sri Lanka	South Africa	Sharjah Cricket Stadium, Sharjah	2	Aiden Markram; Temba Bavuma; Dwaine Pretorius	Lost
4	Kagiso Rabada	6 November 2021	South Africa	England	Sharjah Cricket Stadium, Sharjah	2	Chris Woakes; Eoin Morgan; Chris Jordan	Won
5	Karthik Meiyappan	17 October 2022	United Arab Emirates	Sri Lanka	Kardinia Park, Geelong	1	Bhanuka Rajapaksa; Charith Asalanka; Dasun Shanaka	Lost
6	Josh Little	3 November 2022	Ireland	New Zealand	Adelaide Oval, Adelaide	1	Kane Williamson; James Neesham; Mitchell Santner	Lost
7	Pat Cummins	19 June 2024	Australia	Bangladesh	Sir Vivian Richards Stadium, North Sound	1	Mahmudullah; Mahedi Hasan; Towhid Hridoy	Won
8	Pat Cummins	21 June 2024	Australia	Afghanistan	Arnos Vale Stadium, Kingstown	1	Rashid Khan; Karim Janat; Gulbadin Naib	Lost
9	Chris Jordan	22 June 2024	England	United States	Kensington Oval, Bridgetown	1	Ali Khan; Nosthush Kenjige; Saurabh Netravalkar	Won
10	Romario Shepherd	6 February 2026	West Indies	Scotland	Eden Gardens, Kolkata	2	Matthew Cross; Michael Leask; Oliver Davidson	Won
