= 2016 World Twenty20 final =

2016 ICC World Twenty20 Final
- Match programme cover
- Event: 2016 ICC World Twenty20
England	West Indies
155/9	161/6
20 overs	19.4 overs
- West Indies won by 4 wickets
- Date: 3 April 2016
- Venue: Eden Gardens, Kolkata
- Player of the match: Marlon Samuels (WI)
- Umpires: Kumar Dharmasena (SL) and Rod Tucker (Aus)
- Attendance: 66,000

The 2016 World Twenty20 final was played at the Eden Gardens in Kolkata on 3 April 2016 to determine the winners of the 2016 ICC World Twenty20 between England and the West Indies. The West Indies won the match by 4 wickets, thus becoming the first team to win the ICC World Twenty20 twice. Also, Daren Sammy became only the second West Indies captain after Clive Lloyd (winning captain of Cricket World Cup in 1975 and 1979) to win multiple ICC events as captain. The match recorded the highest attendance ever (66,000) for an ICC World T20 Finals until 2022.

== Background ==
Prior to the tournament, there were concerns that some of the West Indies players may withdraw from the tournament with a dispute over pay, with a possibility of a second-string team being sent. West Indies captain Darren Sammy had exchanged letters with the West Indies Cricket Board (WICB) expressing his concerns regarding the payment players were due to receive for taking part in the tournament. Sammy went on to say that "...we want to play and will represent the West Indies to the best of our abilities".

Before this match England and the West Indies had played each other in two ICC finals – the final of the 1979 World Cup at Lord's and the final of the 2004 Champions Trophy final at the Oval – both of which the West Indies won. This was also the first final between two previous champions – England won the 2010 World T20 for their first ICC world championship while the West Indies won the 2012 World T20.

Both teams were drawn into Super 10s Group 1 alongside Afghanistan, Sri Lanka and South Africa. They played each other in their opening game on 16 March at the Wankhede Stadium in Mumbai, with the West Indies winning by six wickets with 11 balls to spare. West Indian opener Chris Gayle scored an unbeaten 100 runs off 47 balls, including 11 sixes, becoming the first player to hit two T20 International centuries.

Immediately before the men's final, the West Indies won the women's tournament with an eight-wicket victory over three-time defending champions Australia, also at Eden Gardens, which gave them the chance to be the first to win both the men's and women's World Twenty20 on the same day.

== Road to the Final ==
=== England ===
Despite having been the 2010 World T20 champions, England had not advanced past the group stage of the previous year's World Cup and had included only one member of their 2010 champion squad – Irish-born batsman and captain Eoin Morgan. Despite selecting a relatively inexperienced team, England did include players who had World Cup experience and had won Ashes series. They were also in the midst of a limited overs overhaul that eventually brought them victory in the 2019 World Cup on home soil, with members who eventually played in both tournaments including batsmen Joe Root and Jason Roy, all-rounder Ben Stokes, wicketkeeper Jos Buttler, fast bowler Liam Plunkett and leg-spinner Adil Rashid.

After their loss to the West Indies, England beat South Africa with the highest successful run chase (229) in World T20 history before beating Afghanistan and then Sri Lanka to reach the semifinal. In the semifinal they came up against unbeaten New Zealand in Delhi. New Zealand made a strong start to be 89 for 1 after 10 overs, before tight bowling by Stokes and Chris Jordan kept them to 153. Opener Roy scored 78 off 44, a Man of the Match performance, to lead England to a seven-wicket victory with 17 balls remaining.

=== West Indies ===
Despite subpar performances in Test and ODI cricket, the West Indies entered the tournament ranked second in the ICC T20I rankings. Several members of the squad had extensive Twenty20 experience, and most had been part of the 2012 title-winning team. Off-spinner Sunil Narine and all-rounder Kieron Pollard were notable exceptions, but the Windies still fielded power-hitting all-rounders Chris Gayle, Andre Russell and Marlon Samuels in addition to captain Darren Sammy among others.

After prevailing against England, they defeated Sri Lanka in a rematch of the 2012 final and then South Africa. They suffered an upset loss to Afghanistan in their final group match, but with first place in the group already secured. In the semifinal they came up against the hosts India in Mumbai, and India batted first with Virat Kohli's unbeaten 89 off 47 propelling India to 192/2 in their 20 overs. In reply, Gayle was bowled for just 5 and Samuels was dismissed soon after to leave the West Indies in trouble at 19/2. However, power hitting saw the West Indies home, with Russell's six off Kohli with two balls to spare clinching a win by seven wickets. Late replacement Lendl Simmons led the chase, surviving being caught twice off no-balls to score an unbeaten 82 off 51 balls and earn Man of the Match.

== Match ==
=== Match officials ===
- On-field umpires: Kumar Dharmasena (SL) and Rod Tucker (Aus)
- TV umpire: Marais Erasmus (SA)
- Reserve umpire: Bruce Oxenford (Aus)
- Match referee: Ranjan Madugalle (SL)

=== Match summary ===
The West Indies started well with Badree bowling Roy for a duck with just the second ball and fellow opener Alex Hales being caught off Andre Russell in the second over. Morgan was caught at slip by Gayle off Badree to leave England at 3/23 after 4.4 overs. Root helped England climb back into the game with 54 off 36, but he was caught playing an uncharacteristic paddle sweep off Carlos Brathwaite. Dwayne Bravo then took two wickets in three balls dropping England from 110/4 to 111/7. Batting deep, England managed to finish at 155/9 after their 20 overs.

Root was a surprising choice to bowl the second over of the West Indian innings but immediately dismissed both Gayle and fellow opener Johnson Charles. David Willey subsequently had Simmons out LBW for a golden duck leaving the West Indies 11/3 in the third over. A partnership of 75 between Bravo and Samuels kept the West Indies in the game and they were still in with a chance with 45 runs needed from the last four overs. Tight bowling left them nineteen runs behind going into the final over, but Brathwaite hit four consecutive sixes off the first four balls from Ben Stokes to seal the win.

Only three West Indian batsmen reached double figures: Samuels, Brathwaite and Bravo. Samuels finished with an unbeaten 85 off 66, the highest score in World Twenty20 final history. Brathwaite broke the record for the most runs by a single batsman in the final over of a successful chase (Brathwaite's 24 beating Michael Hussey's 22 for Australia off Pakistan's Saeed Ajmal in the 2010 semifinals in St. Lucia). Samuels earned Man of the Match for his 85 not out for his second World Twenty20 final Man of the Match and his second final half century.

Victory meant that the West Indies had won their fourth ICC world championship after the 1975 and 1979 World Cups and the 2012 World Twenty20. They also became the first to win two men's World Twenty20s and the first to win both the women's and men's tournaments on the same day.

3 April
19:00 (D/N)
Scorecard

England; 155/9 (20 overs)	v	West Indies; 161/6 (19.4 overs)
Joe Root 54 (36); Carlos Brathwaite 3/26 (4 overs)		Marlon Samuels 85* (66); David Willey 3/20 (4 overs)

West Indies won by 4 wickets
Eden Gardens, Kolkata
Umpires: Kumar Dharmasena (SL) and Rod Tucker (Aus)
Player of the match: Marlon Samuels (WI)

- West Indies won the toss and elected to field.

=== Scorecard ===
1st innings

England batting
Player	Status	Runs	Balls	4s	6s	Strike rate
Jason Roy	b Badree	0	2	0	0	0.00
Alex Hales	c Badree b Russell	1	3	0	0	33.33
Joe Root	c Benn b Brathwaite	54	36	7	0	150.00
Eoin Morgan *	c Gayle b Badree	5	12	1	0	41.66
Jos Buttler †	c Bravo b Brathwaite	36	22	1	3	163.63
Ben Stokes	c Simmons b Bravo	13	8	1	0	162.50
Moeen Ali	c †Ramdin b Bravo	0	2	0	0	0.00
Chris Jordan	not out	12	13	1	0	92.30
David Willey	c Charles b Brathwaite	21	14	1	2	150.00
Liam Plunkett	c Badree b Bravo	4	4	0	0	100.00
Adil Rashid	not out	4	4	0	0	100.00
Extras	(lb 4, w 1)	5				
Total	(9 wickets; 20 overs)	155		12	5	

Fall of wickets: 1/0 (Roy, 0.2 ov), 2/8 (Hales, 1.5 ov), 3/23 (Morgan, 4.4 ov), 4/84 (Buttler, 11.2 ov), 5/110 (Stokes, 13.4 ov), 6/110 (Ali, 13.6 ov), 7/111 (Root, 14.1 ov), 8/136 (Willey, 17.3 ov), 9/142 (Plunkett, 18.3 ov)

West Indies bowling
Bowler	Overs	Maidens	Runs	Wickets	Econ	Wides	NBs
Samuel Badree	4	1	16	2	4.00	0	0
Andre Russell	4	0	21	1	5.25	0	0
Sulieman Benn	3	0	40	0	13.33	0	0
Dwayne Bravo	4	0	37	3	9.25	0	0
Carlos Brathwaite	4	0	23	3	5.75	1	0
Daren Sammy *	1	0	14	0	14.00	0	0

2nd innings

West Indies batting
Player	Status	Runs	Balls	4s	6s	Strike rate
Johnson Charles	c Stokes b Root	1	7	0	0	14.28
Chris Gayle	c Stokes b Root	4	2	1	0	200.00
Marlon Samuels	not out	85	66	9	2	128.78
Lendl Simmons	lbw b Willey	0	1	0	0	0.00
Dwayne Bravo	c Root b Rashid	25	27	1	1	92.59
Andre Russell	c Stokes b Willey	1	3	0	0	33.33
Daren Sammy *	c Hales b Willey	2	2	0	0	100.00
Carlos Brathwaite	not out	34	10	1	4	340.00
Denesh Ramdin †	did not bat					
Samuel Badree	did not bat					
Sulieman Benn	did not bat					
Extras	(lb 3, w 6)	9				
Total	(6 wickets; 19.4 overs)	161		12	7	

Fall of wickets: 1/1 (Charles, 1.1 ov), 2/5 (Gayle, 1.3 ov), 3/11 (Simmons, 2.3 ov), 4/86 (Bravo, 13.6 ov), 5/104 (Russell, 15.1 ov), 6/107 (Sammy, 15.3 ov)

England bowling
Bowler	Overs	Maidens	Runs	Wickets	Econ	Wides	NBs
David Willey	4	0	20	3	5.00	2	0
Joe Root	1	0	9	2	9.00	0	0
Chris Jordan	4	0	36	0	9.00	1	0
Liam Plunkett	4	0	29	0	7.25	1	0
Adil Rashid	4	0	23	1	5.75	0	0
Ben Stokes	2.4	0	41	0	15.37	2	0

Key

- * – Captain
- † – Wicket-keeper
- c Fielder – Indicates that the batsman was dismissed by a catch by the named fielder
- b Bowler – Indicates which bowler gains credit for the dismissal

== Aftermath ==
At the presentation ceremony, man of the match Marlon Samuels dedicated his award to Shane Warne, saying "I answer with the bat, not the mic". This was in response to an ongoing war-of-words between the two players that dates back to an altercation at the 2013–14 Big Bash League. West Indies captain Darren Sammy criticised the WICB during the presentation speech, saying "I'm yet to hear from our own cricket board (during the tournament). That is very disappointing". England captain Eoin Morgan said that "we let ourselves down with the bat and probably fell about 40 short" and defended Ben Stokes bowling in the final over saying "it's not his fault".

Following the conclusion of the match, the ICC named its World Twenty20 team of the tournament. This included two players from the West Indies team (Andre Russell and Samuel Badree) and four players from the England team (Jason Roy, Joe Root, Jos Buttler and David Willey). In Saint Lucia, the Beauséjour Stadium was renamed the Darren Sammy National Cricket Stadium, following the West Indies win.

On 25 April, the ICC reprimanded some of the West Indies players for their comments at the post-match interviews saying that "certain comments and actions were inappropriate, disrespectful and brought the event into disrepute".
