= 2016 Women's World Twenty20 final =

2016 ICC Women's World Twenty20 Final
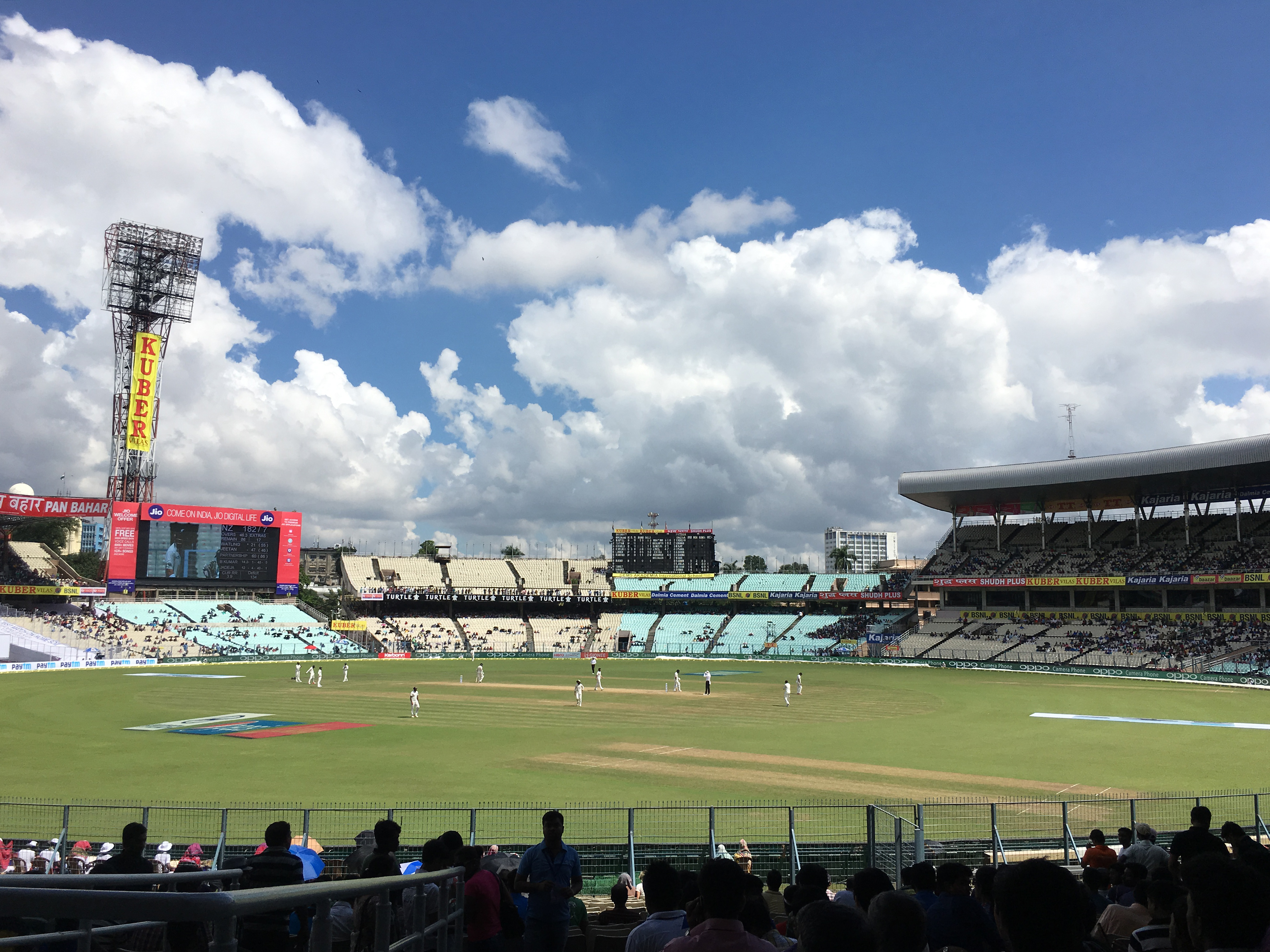
- Eden Gardens in 2016
- Event: 2016 Women's World Twenty20
Australia	West Indies
(Australia)	(Cricket West Indies)
148/5	149/2
20 overs	19.3 overs
- West Indies won by 8 wickets
- Date: 3 April 2016
- Venue: Eden Gardens, Kolkata
- Player of the match: Hayley Matthews (WI)
- Umpires: Aleem Dar (Pak) and Richard Illingworth (Eng)

The 2016 ICC Women's World Twenty20 Final was played at the Eden Gardens in Kolkata on 3 April 2016 to determine the winners of the 2016 ICC Women's World Twenty20 between Australia and West Indies. Australia had made the final four consecutive times, winning the previous three. This appearance in the final was the first for the West Indies, having lost the semi-final on three previous occasions. West Indies chased down 148 runs to win the match by 8 wickets.

== Road to the Final ==
=== Australia ===
Australia began their title defence against South Africa and after a poor start came away with an easy victory. Chasing 103 to win they were reduced to 9 for 3 in the fourth over before Alex Blackwell and captain Meg Lanning got them over the line with six wickets and nine balls remaining. They then suffered a heavy defeat against New Zealand. Batting first they lost 3 wickets for just two runs and never recovered, scoring just 103, mainly thanks to 42 runs from Ellyse Perry. New Zealand began briskly and reached the target with 22 balls remaining. Australia returned to form with a comprehensive nine wicket win over Sri Lanka. Lanning and Elyse Villani both scored fifties in the chase. This continued with a seven wicket victory over Ireland. Australia finished second in their group and qualified for the semi-finals.

Australia meet England in the first semi-final. England won the toss and sent Australia into bat on a slow pitch at Feroz Shah Kotla. The openers started well with Villani and Alyssa Healy combining for a 41 run stand. Lanning then scored a 55 ball 50 taking Australia to a total of 132 for 6. To win England would have to achieve the highest winning run chase so far in the tournament. They came out strong and the opening partnership scored 67 runs at better than a run-a-ball. They needed just 17 runs from the final 10 balls to win, and 12 from the last over bowled by Rene Farrell, but fell short by five runs. Australia reached their fourth straight Twenty20 final, a match they have won three times previously.

=== West Indies ===
The West Indies first match off the tournament was a close low scoring game against Pakistan. Batting first the West Indies scored 103 for 8, with captain Stafanie Taylor scoring 40 runs. Pakistan looked to have the target well in hand, before three quick wickets by West Indian spinner Anisa Mohammed swung the match their way. The West Indies ended up winning their opening game by four runs. Taylor, Hayley Matthews and Deandra Dottin put in strong performances with the bat and the ball as they dominated their next match against Bangladesh. The West Indies scored 148 runs, before bowling Bangladesh out for 99 to go to the top of their group. The third match was much closer. Batting first the West Indies scored 108, and after looking like they were cruising to victory England need a bye from the final delivery to win by a single wicket. Their final group game was against India and the West Indies defended 114 to knock the hosts out of the tournament.

The West Indies came up against the unbeaten New Zealanders in the other semi-final. Batting first the West Indies scored an imposing 143 for 6, led by Britney Cooper's 48 ball 61. Taylor and Dottin also contributed important runs during the middle of the innings before Merissa Aguilleira finished it off with a quick 15 runs from 10 balls. In reply New Zealand were reduced to 49 for 3, before recovering to need 43 from the last five overs. Two wickets in two balls from Taylor, both New Zealand wickets caught by Shemaine Campbelle, gave the advantage back to the West Indies and they ended up winning the match by six runs. The West Indies made it through to their first final, having fallen at the semi-final stage three previous times.

== Match ==
=== Summary ===
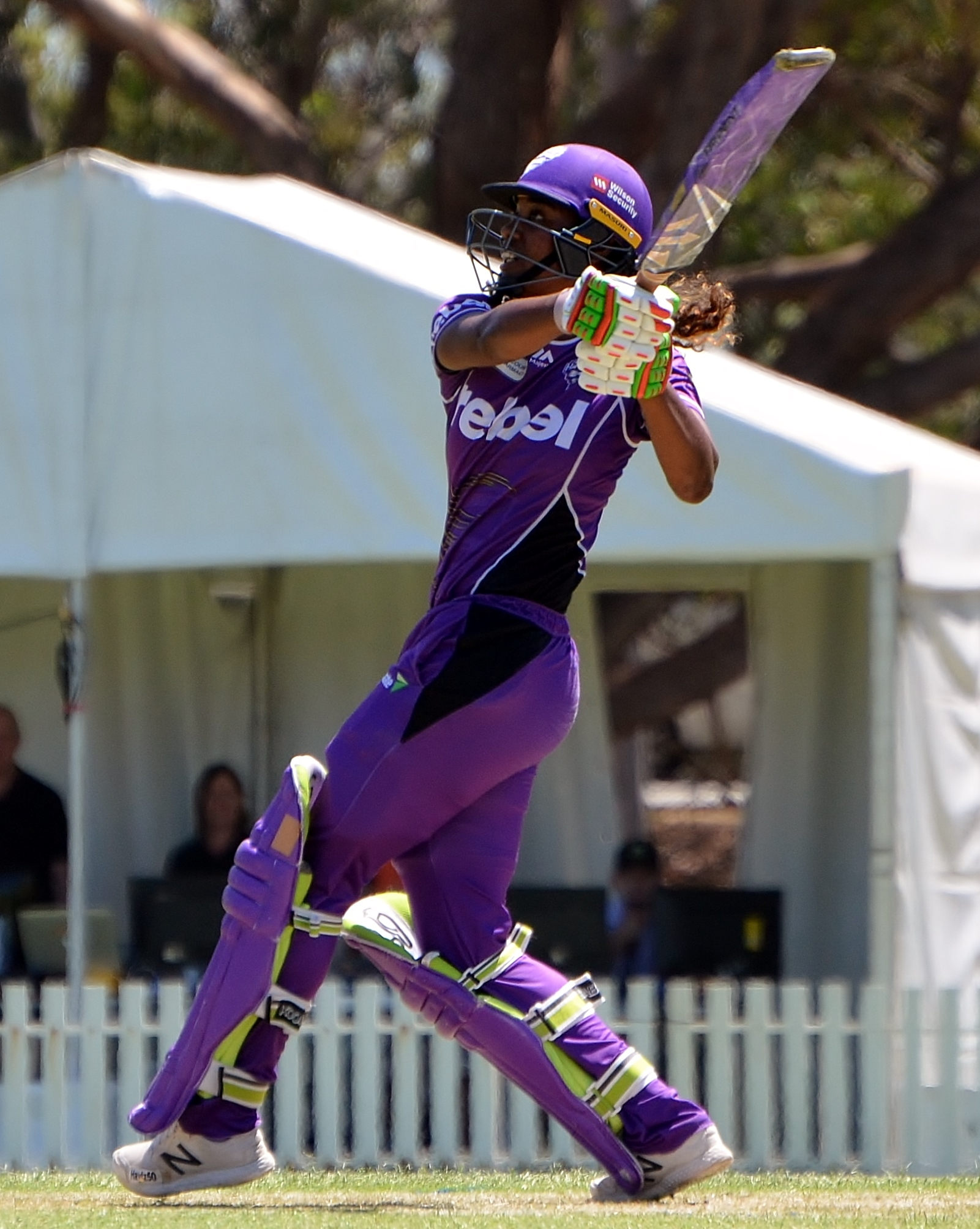
The West Indies' Hayley Matthews was player of the match.

The final was played at Eden Gardens before the men's final which also featured the West Indies. Australia won the toss and elected to bat scoring an imposing 148 for 5, with Lanning and Villani both contributing 52 runs. Despite losing opening partner Healy in the second over, Villani played aggressively and Australia scored 54 runs in the first six overs. Her 77 run second wicket partnership with Lanning was broken when Villani was caught off Taylors bowling. Lanning and Perry, 28 from 23 balls, continued the assault as Australia reached 100 in the 14th over. The West Indies fought back well to only concede 36 runs from the last five overs, including only one run from the last over.

The West Indies began the chase slowly, scoring just nine runs from the first three overs. Matthews and Taylor warmed up quickly, scoring 120 runs at more than a run a ball before Matthews was dismissed in the 15th over. When Taylor was finally caught in the 18th over, the West Indies needed just five runs for victory from eight balls. With two runs required from four balls, Cooper pushed for a tight run and the throw that would have run her out had it hit the stumps missed. The overthrow saw the West Indies win their maiden Twenty20 title, completing the second highest successful run chase in the tournament's history.

Counterparts from the West Indian men's team, including Carlos Brathwaite and captain Darren Sammy, quickly joined the women's team in celebrating their victory. The West Indian women's team stayed at Eden Gardens to watch the men's team in their final against England immediately afterwards and joined the men's team after Brathwaite's and Marlon Samuels' heroics secured a four-wicket victory, making the West Indies the first to win both the men's and women's World Twenty20s on the same day.

=== Match officials ===
- Umpires: Aleem Dar (Pak) and Richard Illingworth (Eng)
- TV umpire: Nigel Llong (Eng)
- Match referee: Andy Pycroft (Zim)
- Reserve umpire: Sundaram Ravi (Ind)

=== Scorecard ===
3 April
14:30
Scorecard

Australia; 148/5 (20 overs)	v	West Indies; 149/2 (19.3 overs)
Elyse Villani 52 (37); Deandra Dottin 2/33 (4 overs)		Hayley Matthews 66 (45); Kristen Beams 1/27 (4 overs)

West Indies won by 8 wickets
Eden Gardens, Kolkata
Umpires: Aleem Dar (Pak) and Richard Illingworth (Eng)
Player of the match: Hayley Matthews (WI)

- Australia won the toss and elected to bat.
