= 2022 Men's T20 World Cup final =

Cricket match

2022 ICC Men's T20 World Cup final
- Match programme cover
- Event: 2022 ICC Men's T20 World Cup
Pakistan	England
137/8	138/5
20 overs	19 overs
- England won by 5 wickets
- Date: 13 November 2022
- Venue: Melbourne Cricket Ground, Melbourne
- Player of the match: Sam Curran (Eng)
- Umpires: Kumar Dharmasena (SL) and Marais Erasmus (SA)
- Attendance: 80,462

The 2022 ICC Men's T20 World Cup final was a Twenty20 International cricket match played at MCG in Melbourne, Australia on 13 November 2022 to determine the winner of the 2022 ICC Men's T20 World Cup. It was played between England and Pakistan, with both the teams eyeing their second ICC Men's T20 World Cup title. England won the match by 5 wickets to win the title for the second time. Having also won the 2019 Cricket World Cup Final, England became the first men's team to hold the ODI World Cup and T20 World Cup titles at the same time.

== Background ==
Originally, the tournament was to be held in 2020, however, in July 2020, the International Cricket Council (ICC) confirmed that the tournament had been postponed, due to the COVID-19 pandemic. In August 2020, the ICC also confirmed that Australia would host the rearranged tournament in 2022. On 15 November 2021, the ICC released the venues that would host matches across the tournament, with the Melbourne Cricket Ground being named as the venue for the finals. The England team wore black armbands to pay their respects to David English who died the day before.

Before this match, England and Pakistan had played each other two times in the ICC Men's T20 World Cup, with England winning on both occasions in 2009 and 2010.

== Road to the final ==
Both teams entered looking to win their second World T20 and their third ICC world championship. The game was also a rematch of the 1992 World Cup final, 30 years beforehand at the same venue, where a Pakistani team led by Imran Khan had been victorious. Both teams had also played a 7-match T20 series in Pakistan with England winning 4–3, with the Test portion of the tour (the first time England had played Tests while touring Pakistan since 2005) to take place after the World T20.

=== Overview ===
England		VS	Pakistan
Opponent	Result	Super 12 stage	Opponent	Result
Afghanistan	England won by 5 wickets	Match 1	India	India won by 4 wickets
Ireland	Ireland won by 5 runs (DLS)	Match 2	Zimbabwe	Zimbabwe won by 1 run
Australia	Match abandoned	Match 3	Netherlands	Pakistan won by 6 wickets
New Zealand	England won by 20 runs	Match 4	South Africa	Pakistan won by 33 runs (DLS)
Sri Lanka	England won by 4 wickets	Match 5	Bangladesh	Pakistan won by 5 wickets
Semi-final 2		Knockout stage	Semi-final 1
Opponent	Result		Opponent	Result
India	England won by 10 wickets		New Zealand	Pakistan won by 7 wickets
2022 ICC Men's T20 World Cup Final

=== Pakistan ===
They lost their first two opening matches in the Super 12s off the last ball, first against arch-rival India at the MCG and then against Zimbabwe in Perth, but then beat the Netherlands in Perth, South Africa in Sydney and Bangladesh in Adelaide to advance as Group 2 runner-up after the Netherlands upset South Africa. In their semifinal in Sydney, they beat New Zealand by 7 wickets with 5 balls to spare, with Rizwan being named Man of the Match scoring 57 off 43 balls.

=== England ===
England fielded a number of players who had been part of their first-ever ODI World Cup victory on home soil in 2019. Wicketkeeper Jos Buttler had taken over as captain following Eoin Morgan's retirement, and England also returned with, among others, leg-spinner Adil Rashid and all-rounders Chris Woakes, Moeen Ali and Test captain Ben Stokes, the Man of the Match of their Super Over victory against New Zealand in the final at Lord's. Buttler, Stokes, and Rashid had also all played in the 2016 final in Kolkata, England's last appearance in a World T20 men's final, when they had lost to the West Indies following Carlos Brathwaite's four sixes off Stokes in the final over with 19 runs required. Other changes from the 2019 team included Alex Hales' recall following Morgan's retirement and Jonny Bairstow being ruled out with an injury, while Mark Wood was selected but ruled out due to injury with Chris Jordan taking his spot.

Following an opening win against Afghanistan in Perth, they lost to Ireland at the MCG and then had their showdown with arch-rival, host and defending champion Australia at the same venue rained out, but they then beat New Zealand in Brisbane and then Sri Lanka in Sydney to advance past Australia on net run rate as Group 1 runner-up. In their semifinal, they then dispatched India by 10 wickets in Adelaide with 4 overs to spare as Buttler (80 not out) and Man of the Match Hales (86 not out) recorded England's highest-ever partnership in a men's World T20 match at 170 runs.

== Match ==
=== Match officials ===
- On-field umpires: Kumar Dharmasena (SL) and Marais Erasmus (SA)
- TV umpire: Chris Gaffaney (NZ)
- Reserve umpire: Paul Reiffel (Aus)
- Match referee: Ranjan Madugalle (SL)

=== Summary ===
Pakistan were asked to bat first and scored a total of 137 runs for the fall of 8 wickets. Shan Masood was Pakistan's top scorer with 38 runs. England's Sam Curran took 3 wickets for 12 runs, eventually earning both Man of the Match and Player of the Tournament honors.

In the second innings, England finished the six-over powerplay with 49 runs for 3 wickets. In the 13th over, the game changed when Shaheen Afridi slid forwards to take a catch off Shadab Khan, dismissing Harry Brook. Shaheen jarred his right knee in the process. With England needing 41 runs off five overs, Shaheen attempted to return for his third over after receiving some treatment but pulled out of his run-up once and then sending one slow delivery down to Moeen Ali before leaving the match with his injury. Iftikhar Ahmed replaced him as the bowler and proved to be expensive. Ben Stokes scored his maiden T20I fifty and then hit the winning run with six balls to spare. Stokes also became just the fifth player to record half centuries in multiple ICC World Cup (ODI or T20) finals after Australia's Adam Gilchrist, Sri Lanka's Kumar Sangakkara, India's Gautam Gambhir and the West Indies' Marlon Samuels.

Following the tournament, England's tour of Pakistan continued with the Test series, which England won 3–0. Stokes subsequently placed second in the BBC Sports Personality of the Year Award voting behind UEFA Women's Euro 2022 winner and player of the tournament Beth Mead, having previously won the award in 2019.

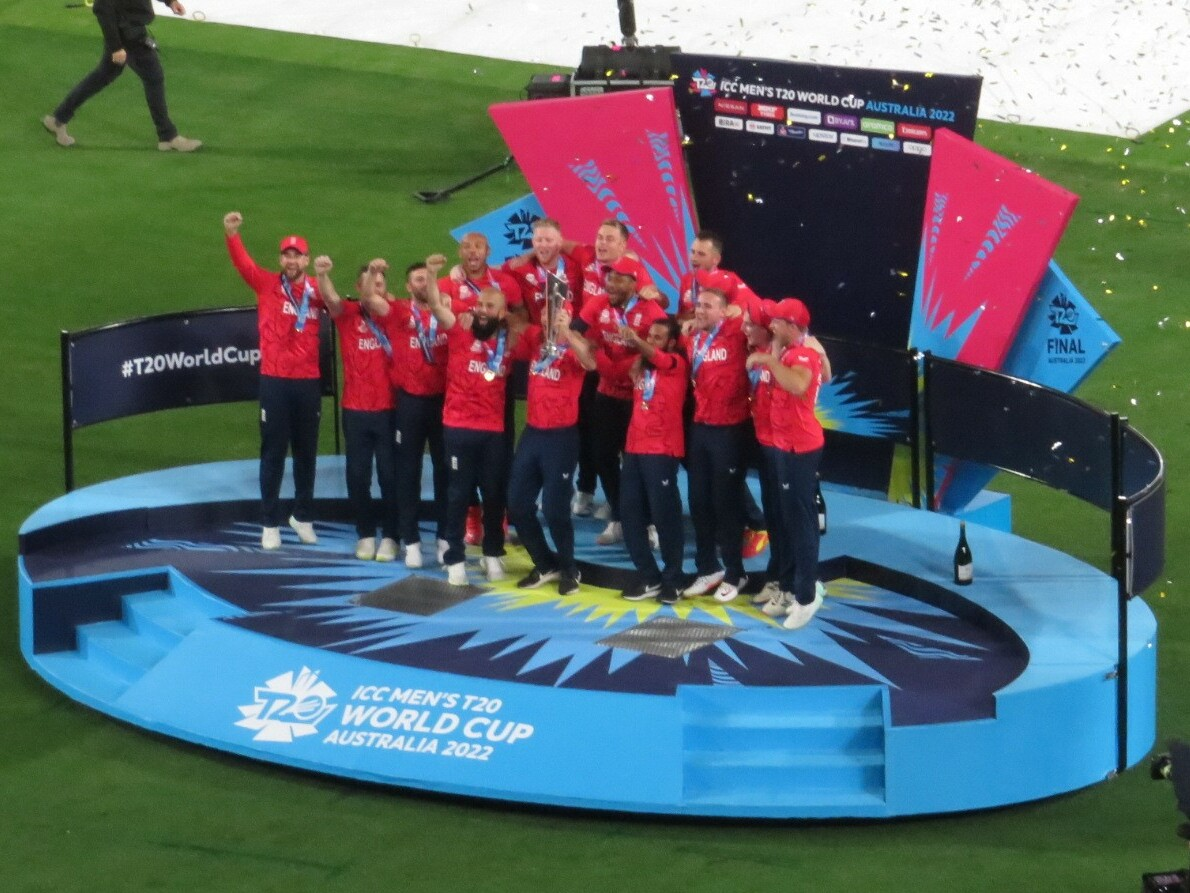
England players after being presented with the 2022 ICC Men's T20 World Cup trophy

13 November 2022
19:00 (N)
Scorecard

Pakistan; 137/8 (20 overs)	v	England; 138/5 (19 overs)
Shan Masood 38 (28); Sam Curran 3/12 (4 overs)		Ben Stokes 52* (49); Haris Rauf 2/23 (4 overs)

England won by 5 wickets
Melbourne Cricket Ground, Melbourne
Attendance: 80,462
Umpires: Kumar Dharmasena (SL) and Marais Erasmus (SA)
Player of the match: Sam Curran (Eng)

- England won the toss and elected to field.
- England won their second T20 World Cup title.
- England became the first men's team to hold both the ODI (50-over) and T20 World Cups simultaneously.
- Ben Stokes (Eng) played in his last T20I.

=== Scorecard ===
1st innings

Pakistan batting
Player	Status	Runs	Balls	4s	6s	Strike rate
Mohammad Rizwan	b Curran	15	14	0	1	107.14
Babar Azam	c & b Rashid	32	28	2	0	114.28
Mohammad Haris	c Stokes b Rashid	8	12	1	0	66.66
Shan Masood	c Livingstone b Curran	38	28	2	1	135.71
Iftikhar Ahmed	c Buttler b Stokes	0	6	0	0	0
Shadab Khan	c Woakes b Jordan	20	14	2	0	142.85
Mohammad Nawaz	c Livingstone b Curran	5	7	0	0	71.42
Mohammad Wasim Jr.	c Livingstone b Jordan	4	8	0	0	50.00
Shaheen Afridi	not out	5	3	1	0	166.66
Haris Rauf	not out	1	1	0	0	100.00
Naseem Shah	did not bat					
Extras	(b 1, lb 1, w 6, nb 1)	9				
Total	(8 wickets; 20 overs)	137		8	2	

Fall of wickets: 1/29 (Rizwan, 4.2 ov), 2/45 (Haris, 7.1 ov), 3/84 (Babar, 11.1 ov), 4/85 (Iftikhar, 12.2 ov), 5/121 (Masood, 16.3 ov), 6/123 (Shadab, 17.2 ov), 7/129 (Nawaz, 18.3 ov), 8/131 (Wasim, 19.3 ov)

England bowling
Bowler	Overs	Maidens	Runs	Wickets	Econ	Wides	NBs
Ben Stokes	4	0	32	1	8.00	2	1
Chris Woakes	3	0	26	0	8.66	2	0
Sam Curran	4	0	12	3	3.00	0	0
Adil Rashid	4	1	22	2	5.50	1	0
Chris Jordan	4	0	27	2	6.75	0	0
Liam Livingstone	1	0	16	0	16.00	1	0

2nd innings

England batting
Player	Status	Runs	Balls	4s	6s	Strike rate
Jos Buttler	c Rizwan b Rauf	26	17	3	1	152.94
Alex Hales	b Afridi	1	2	0	0	50.00
Phil Salt	c Iftikhar b Rauf	10	9	2	0	111.11
Ben Stokes	not out	52	49	5	1	106.12
Harry Brook	c Afridi b Shadab	20	23	1	0	86.95
Moeen Ali	b Wasim Jr	19	13	3	0	146.15
Liam Livingstone	not out	1	1	0	0	100.00
Sam Curran	did not bat					
Chris Woakes	did not bat					
Chris Jordan	did not bat					
Adil Rashid	did not bat					
Extras	(lb 1, w 8)	9				
Total	(5 wickets; 19 overs)	138		14	2	

Fall of wickets: 1/7 (Hales, 0.6 ov), 2/32 (Salt, 3.3 ov), 3/45 (Buttler, 5.3 ov), 4/84 (Brook, 12.3 ov), 5/132 (Ali, 18.2 ov)

Pakistan bowling
Bowler	Overs	Maidens	Runs	Wickets	Econ	Wides	NBs
Shaheen Afridi	2.1	0	13	1	6.00	0	0
Naseem Shah	4	0	30	0	7.50	1	0
Haris Rauf	2	0	23	2	5.75	1	0
Shadab Khan	4	0	20	1	5.00	0	0
Mohammad Wasim	4	0	38	1	9.50	2	0
Iftikhar Ahmed	0.5	0	13	0	15.60	0	0
