= Kumar Dharmasena =

Sri Lankan cricket umpire (born 1971)

Deshabandu Kumar Dharmasena
- Dharmasena in 2026

Personal information
- Full name: Handunnettige Deepthi Priyantha Kumara Dharmasena
- Born: 24 April 1971 (age 55); Colombo, Sri Lanka
- Nickname: Unanduwa
- Height: 1.72 m (5 ft 8 in)
- Batting: Right-handed
- Bowling: Right-arm offbreak
- Role: All-rounder, umpire

International information
- National side: Sri Lanka (1993–2004)
- Test debut (cap 59): 6 September 1993 v South Africa
- Last Test: 8 March 2004 v Australia
- ODI debut (cap 82): 24 August 1994 v Pakistan
- Last ODI: 25 February 2004 v Australia
- ODI shirt no.: 66

Domestic team information
- Years: Team
- 1988–2006: Bloomfield Cricket and Athletic Club
- 1992: Nondescripts Cricket Club
- 1994: Moratuwa Cricket Club

Umpiring information
- Tests umpired: 93 (2010–2025)
- ODIs umpired: 140 (2009–2026)
- T20Is umpired: 52 (2009–2026)
- WODIs umpired: 1 (2008)

Career statistics
Competition	Test	ODI	FC	LA
Matches	31	141	155	206
Runs scored	868	1,222	6,550	2,281
Batting average	19.72	22.62	36.18	26.21
100s/50s	0/3	0/4	9/37	0/9
Top score	62*	69*	157	94*
Balls bowled	6,939	7,009	25,549	9,747
Wickets	69	138	495	234
Bowling average	42.31	36.21	20.77	28.62
5 wickets in innings	3	0	30	3
10 wickets in match	0	0	5	0
Best bowling	6/72	4/37	7/30	5/14
Catches/stumpings	14/–	34/–	78/–	50/–
Medal record
Men's Cricket
Representing Sri Lanka
ICC Cricket World Cup
Winner	1996 India-Pakistan-Sri Lanka
ICC Champions Trophy
Winner	2002 Sri Lanka
- Source: Cricinfo, 24 November 2023

Deshabandu Handunnettige Deepthi Priyantha Kumar Dharmasena (born 24 April 1971) is a Sri Lankan cricket umpire and former international cricketer. He is a member of the Elite Panel of ICC Umpires and the first person to participate in an ICC Cricket World Cup final both as a player and an umpire. A right-handed batsman and a right-arm off break bowler, Dharmasena was a member of the Sri Lankan side that won the 1996 Cricket World Cup and the side which were joint-winners of the 2002 ICC Champions Trophy with India.

== Playing career ==
Dharmasena was born in Colombo on 24 April 1971. He started his cricketing career as a teenager at Nalanda College Colombo. His first foray into international cricket was in 1994 in a Test match against South Africa.

His obscure action made him perfect for bowling in one-day matches, yet Dharmasena also proved a useful batsman, especially after he was investigated in 1998 by the ICC for overstretching his bowling action to illegal proportions. Having been cleared in July 2000, he played for the one-day team on several occasions since, but rarely played Test cricket.

Dharmasena was the 59th Sri Lankan cricketer to receive a Test cap (Sri Lanka v South Africa at Colombo Sinhalese Sports Club 1993).

Kumar Dharmasena has the record for playing the most number of ODI innings before being dismissed for a duck (72 innings).

He along with Dulip Liyanage set the record for the highest 8th wicket runstand for Sri Lanka in ODI cricket (91).

== Umpiring career ==
Following his retirement as a cricketer in November 2006, Dharmasena announced plans to become a competitive umpire, as he wished to remain "close to the game which I love so dearly". Prior to his retirement, he had already umpired several domestic matches in the Sara Trophy, the major first-class cricket tournament in Sri Lanka. He umpired his first international match in 2009, overseeing the one-day international between India and Sri Lanka at the Rangiri International Stadium in Dambulla: he remains the youngest ever Sri Lankan to umpire any international match. He umpired in the 2011 Cricket World Cup, and was appointed to the Elite Panel of ICC Umpires later that year. Dharmasena was named the Umpire of the Year at the 2012 ICC Awards, receiving the David Shepherd Trophy.

He was selected as one of the twenty umpires to stand in matches during the 2015 Cricket World Cup and umpired in the final. In doing so he became the first to play in and to umpire World Cup finals. He stood in the final of the 2016 ICC World Twenty20.

Kumar Dharmasena has worked as an umpire in 18 matches of ICC World T20, the most by any umpire from Sri Lanka.

In January 2019, he won the David Shepherd Trophy for the ICC Umpire of the Year at the 2018 ICC Awards. In April 2019, he was named as one of the sixteen umpires to stand in matches during the 2019 Cricket World Cup. In July 2019, he was named as one of the two on-field umpires for the second semi-final match, between Australia and England. Later the same month, he was also named as one of the two on-field umpires for the Cricket World Cup Final. England won the match in a Super Over. He admitted an error at a critical moment in the match, but said he did not regret it. Had the right decision been made, England would have required 4 runs instead of 3 to win off the last 2 balls.

He also umpired the final match of the 2022 ICC Men's T20 World Cup between Pakistan and England.

In September 2023, he was named as one of the sixteen match officials for 2023 Cricket World Cup.

== Records ==
- Dharmasena is the one of two people (alongside Richard Illingworth) to have played in a Final of the Cricket World Cup as well as officiated in the final of the World Cup. He had played in the 1996 Cricket World Cup Final and featured as an on-field umpire twice in 2015 and 2019 World Cup finals.

== See also ==
- List of Test cricket umpires
- List of One Day International cricket umpires
- List of Twenty20 International cricket umpires
