= Eden Gardens =

International cricket stadium in Kolkata, West Bengal, India

- "Lord's of the East"
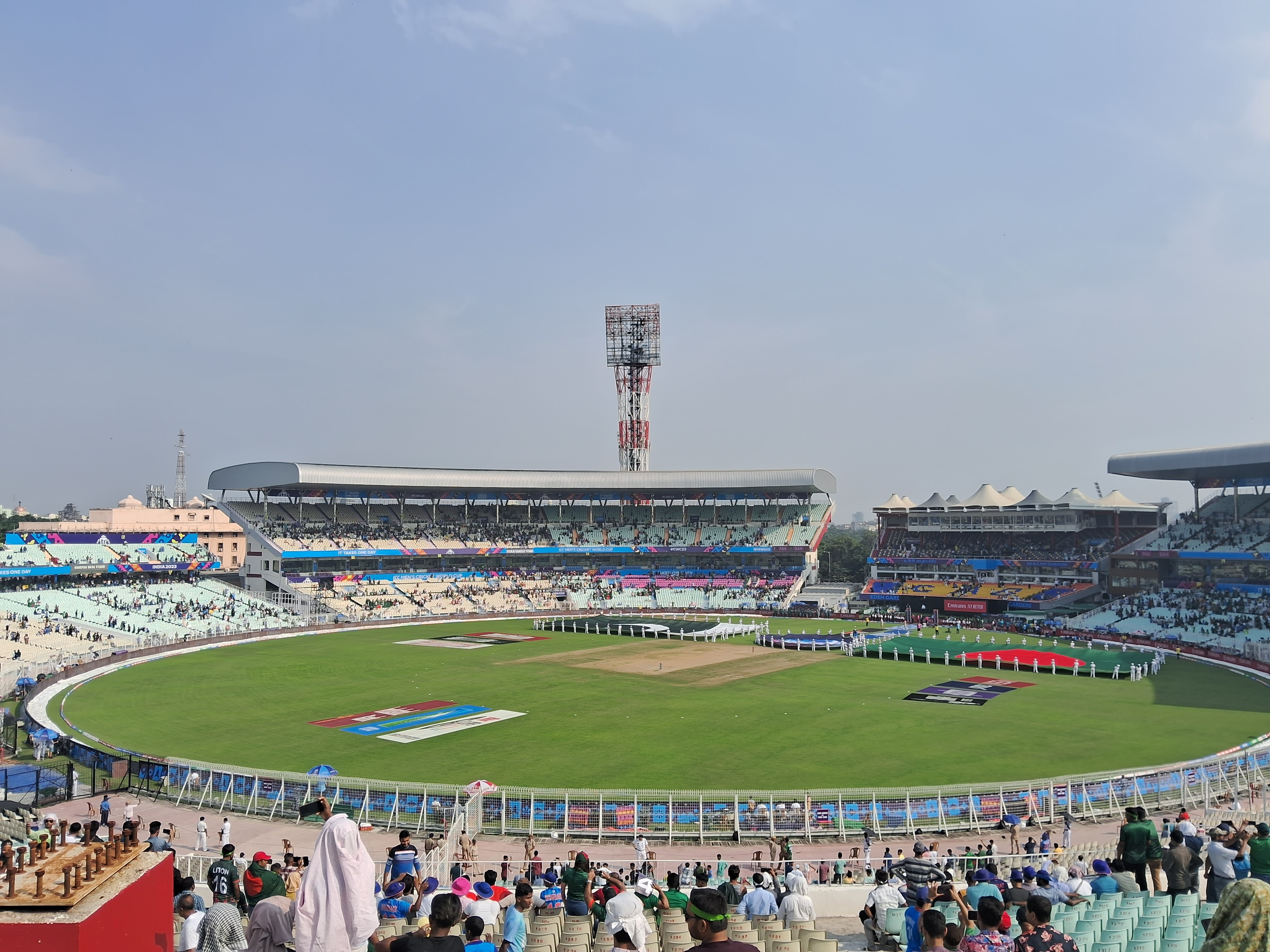
- Interactive map of Eden Gardens
- Address: Gostho Paul Sarani, Maidan, B. B. D. Bagh; Kolkata, West Bengal; India
- Location: Near Maidan, B.B.D. Bagh, Kolkata, West Bengal, India
- Seating type: Stadium seating
- Capacity: 68,000 (Current); 100,000 (Planned Expansion); 100,000 (1987–2010); 40,000 (before 1987)
- Surface: Grass
- Record attendance: 110,564 (India v. Sri Lanka in 1996 Cricket World Cup Semi-Final)
- Field size: 66–68 meters (Square Boundaries); 76–78 meters (Straight Boundaries); boundary length is 66 meters on the square side and 76 meters on the straight side; 20.11 meters (Long Pitch)
- Field shape: Circular
- Acreage: 50 acres (0.20 km^{2})
- Public transit: Eden Gardens; Eden Gardens; Eden Gardens

Construction
- Renovated: 2010–11
- Years active: 1864–present

Ground information
- Home club: Kolkata Knight Riders (2008–present); Bengal men's team (1889–present); Bengal women's team
- Establishment: 1864; 162 years ago
- Owner: Eastern Command of the Indian Army
- Operator: Cricket Association of Bengal
- Tenants: India men's (1934-present); India women's (1978-present); India men's football (1982–1984)
- End names
- High Court End Pavilion End
- First men's Test: 5–8 January 1934: India v England
- Last men's Test: 14–18 November 2025: India v South Africa
- First men's ODI: 18 February 1987: India v Pakistan
- Last men's ODI: 16 November 2023: Australia v South Africa
- First men's T20I: 29 October 2011: India v England
- Last men's T20I: 4 March 2026: South Africa v New Zealand
- First women's ODI: 1 January 1978: India v England
- Last women's ODI: 9 December 2005: India v England
- Only women's T20I: 3 April 2016: Australia v West Indies
- As of 16 November 2023; Source: ESPNcricinfo

Eden Gardens is an international cricket stadium in Kolkata, India. Established in 1864, it is the oldest and second-largest cricket stadium in India and third-largest in the world. The stadium currently has a capacity of 68,000. It is operated by Cricket Association of Bengal and is the home ground of the Kolkata Knight Riders. It houses the headquarters of Cricket Association of Bengal.

Eden Gardens is often referred to as home of Indian cricket and has also been described as "cricket's answer to the Colosseum" and called the "Mecca of Indian cricket", due to it being the first purpose-built ground for the sport. Eden Gardens has hosted matches in major international competitions including the World Cup, World Twenty20 and Asia Cup. In 1987, Eden Gardens became the second stadium to host a World Cup final. The 2016 ICC World Twenty20 final was held at the stadium, with the West Indies beating England in a closely fought encounter. Eden Gardens witnessed a record crowd of 110,564 in the 1996 India Vs Sri Lanka Cricket World Cup Semi Final.

== Stadium history ==
Ground of the Calcutta Cricket Club, 15 Jan'y. 1861 H.M. 68th L.I. from Rangoon, versus the Calcutta Cricket Club, a lithograph after a watercolour by Percy Carpenter, depicting a Calcutta Cricket Club match played at Eden Gardens.

The stadium was established in 1864. The origins of its name are uncertain. According to some, the stadium is named after the Eden Gardens park where it is located, itself named after the Eden sisters, Emily and Fanny, of Lord Auckland, the Governor-General of India (1836–1842). Initially named the 'Auckland Circus Gardens', the park was renamed to the 'Eden Gardens' in 1841.

However, according to popular culture, Babu Rajchandra Das, the zamindar of Janbazar, Kolkata and husband of Rani Rashmoni, gifted one of his biggest gardens, Marh Bagan, besides the river Hooghly, to Lord Auckland and his sister Emily Eden in gratitude for their help in saving his third daughter from a fatal disease. The garden was then renamed to the Eden Gardens.

The cricket grounds were built between Babughat and Fort William. The stadium is in the B. B. D. Bagh area of the city, near the State Secretariat and across from the Calcutta High Court.

The first Test match at the venue was held in 1934 between England and India, its first One Day International in 1987 between India and Pakistan and its first T20 international in 2011 between India and England. The 1993 Hero Cup semi-final featuring India and South Africa was the first day/night match.

The stadium also hosted matches of the inaugural edition of Nehru Cup in 1982.

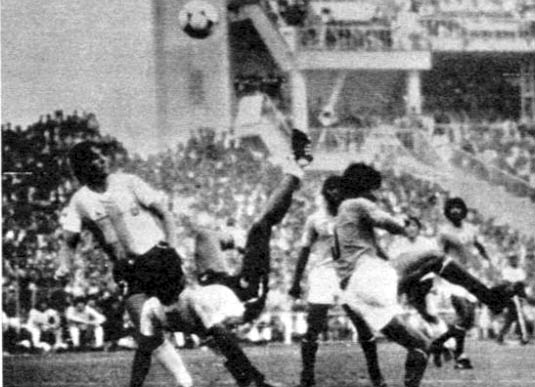
India versus Uruguay match at Eden Gardens in Nehru Cup on 14 January 1984

The Eden Gardens also hosted the India versus Uruguay football match in 1984 Nehru Cup.

=== 1980 Stampede ===
16 people were killed in a stampede and riot inside Eden Gardens during a Mohun Bagan-East Bengal Calcutta Football League (CFL) match on 16 August 1980.

== Stadium ==
The stadium is the headquarters of the Cricket Association of Bengal. Apart from international matches, the stadium hosts the Bengal cricket team and the Kolkata Knight Riders, an Indian Premier League franchise. The stadium's Club House is named after former Chief Minister of West Bengal Dr. B. C. Roy.

=== 1987 renovation ===
The stadium's capacity was expanded to 100,000 from 40,000 for the 1987 World Cup. The expansion also included renovations to the press area. 42 columns were added to provide the support for large roofs and multi-tiered covered stands. Even after the renovation, not all seats were covered, and many sections lacked individual seats.

However, match day attendance of more than 100,000 spectators has been recorded on at least 6 occasions until the early 2000s.

=== 2011 renovation ===
Eden Gardens underwent renovation for the 2011 Cricket World Cup. Renovation had been undertaken to meet the standards set by the International Cricket Council (ICC) for the 2011 World Cup. The Cricket Association of Bengal hired a consortium of Philadelphia-based Burt Hill Architects(now INI Design Studio) and Ahmedabad-based VMS architecture firms for a two-year project to renovate the stadium. The plans for the renovated stadium included a new clubhouse and players' facilities, upgrades of the exterior walls to give the stadium a new look, cladding the existing roof structure with a new metal skin, new/upgraded patron amenities & signage and general infrastructure improvements. The upgrade also meant reduction of the seating capacity to about 68,000 from around 94,000 before the upgrade.

Due to unsafe conditions arising from the incomplete renovations, the ICC withdrew the India vs. England match from the Eden Gardens. This match, scheduled on 27 February 2011, was played in Bengaluru at M.Chinnaswamy Stadium.

The stadium hosted the remaining three scheduled World Cup 2011 Matches on 15, 18 and 20 March 2011. In the last of these three matches (Kenya vs Zimbabwe), the stadium had the lowest ticket-purchasing crowd in its recorded history with 15 spectators having bought tickets.

=== Stands ===
Eden Gardens stands have been named after prominent local cricketers and soldiers.On 22 January 2017, two stands were named after Indian cricketers - Sourav Ganguly and Pankaj Roy while two more were named after cricket administrators - BN Dutt (BCCI President 1988 to 1990) and Jagmohan Dalmiya (BCCI President 2001–04, 2013 - interim, 2015). Dalmiya served as ICC President from 1997 to 2000.

On 27 April 2017, 4 stands were named after Indian soldiers - Colonel Neelakantan Jayachandran Nair, Havildar Hangpan Dada, Lieutenant Colonel Dhan Singh Thapa and Subedar Joginder Singh Sahnan. Lt Col Thapa and Subedar Singh are Param Vir Chakra awardees - the highest wartime military decoration in India while Col Nair and Havildar Dada are Ashok Chakra - the highest peacetime military decoration.

In 2024, a stand was decided to be dedicated to star Indian pacer and the highest ODI wicket taker among women, Jhulan Goswami. It was unveiled on 22 January 2025.

== Experience ==
Eden Gardens is renowned for its large and passionate crowds. Former Aussie captain Steve Waugh considers the Eden Gardens as 'Lord's of the subcontinent'. Former Indian Captain and Kolkata-native Sourav Ganguly confessed once in an interview that the roar of crowd at the stadium he heard when India defeated Australia in the Second Test of 2000–01 Border–Gavaskar Trophy was the loudest he had ever heard.

In 2016, a bell was added to the stadium to ring in the start of day's play for test cricket and start of match for ODI & T20I matches. Kapil Dev was the first person to ring the bell to start the test match between India and New Zealand in September 2016.

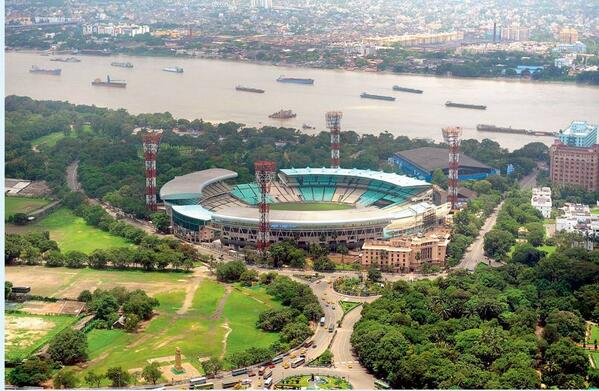
Eden Gardens Aerial view

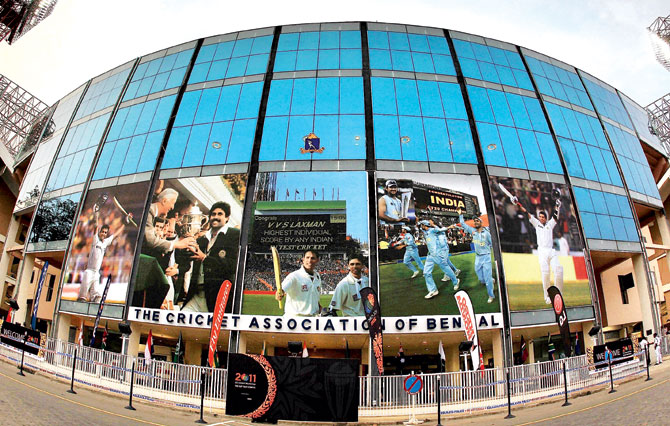
Eden Gardens front facade

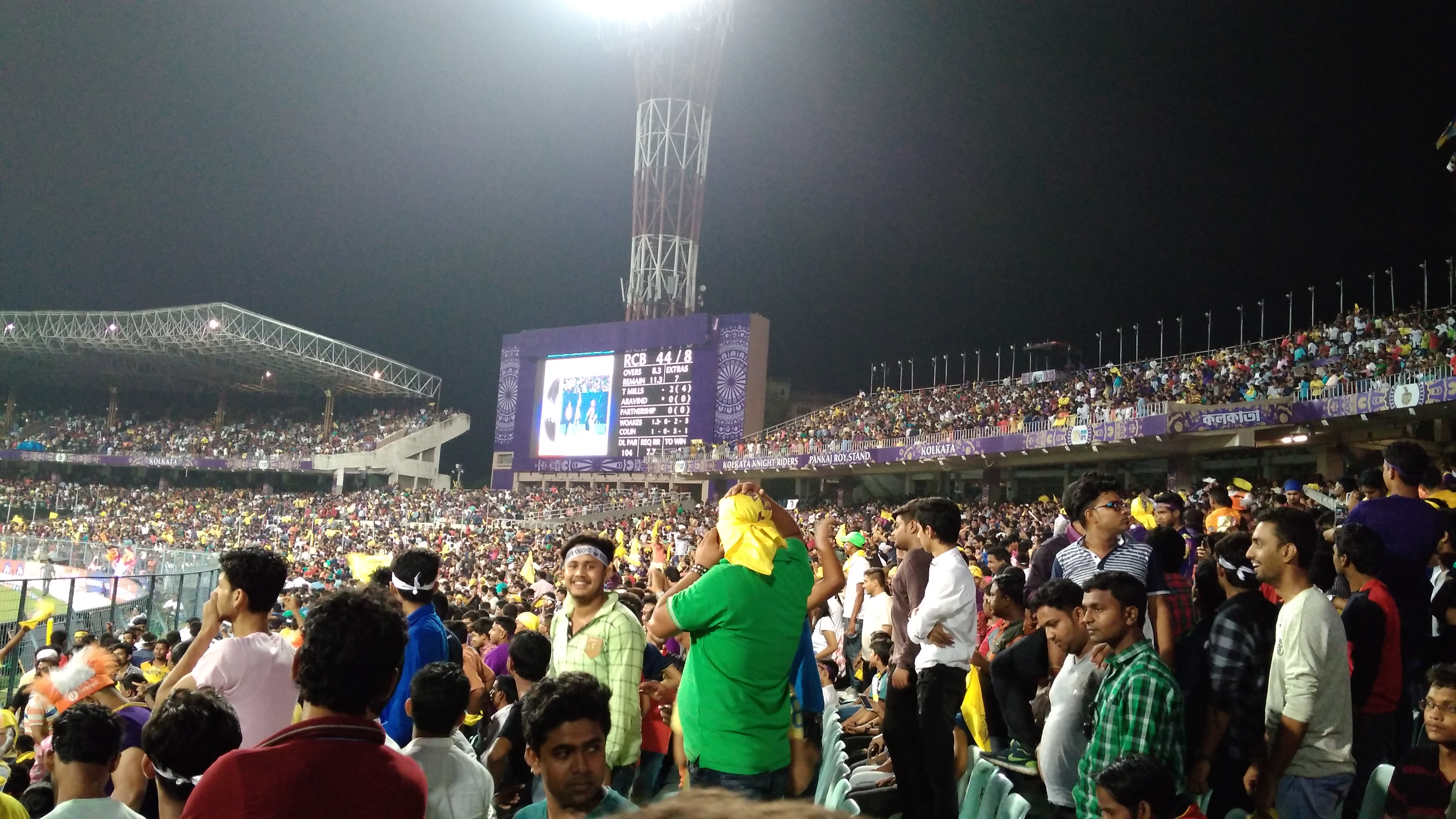
Massive crowd during KKR Vs RCB 2017 IPL match.

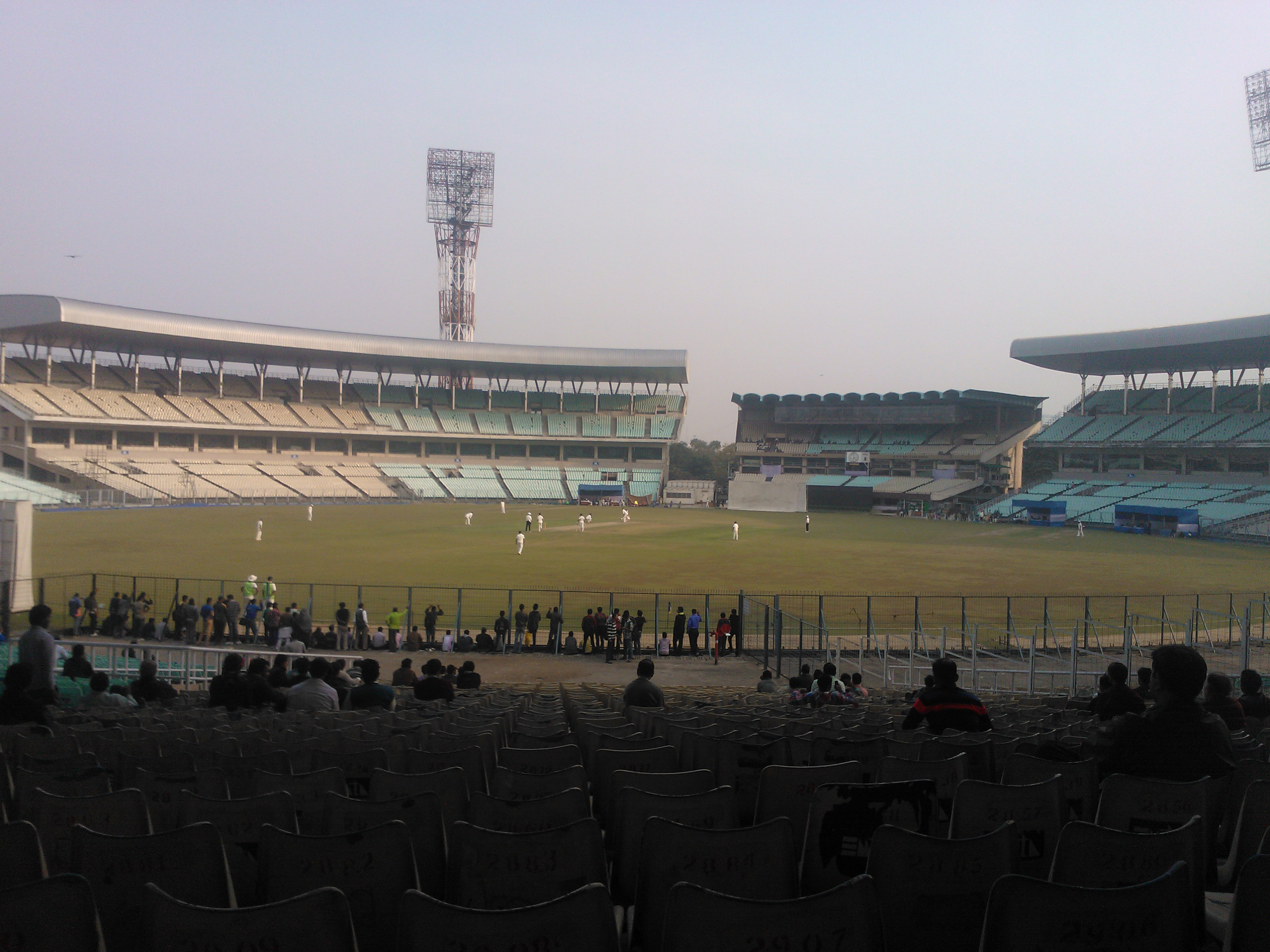
The ground during a Test match

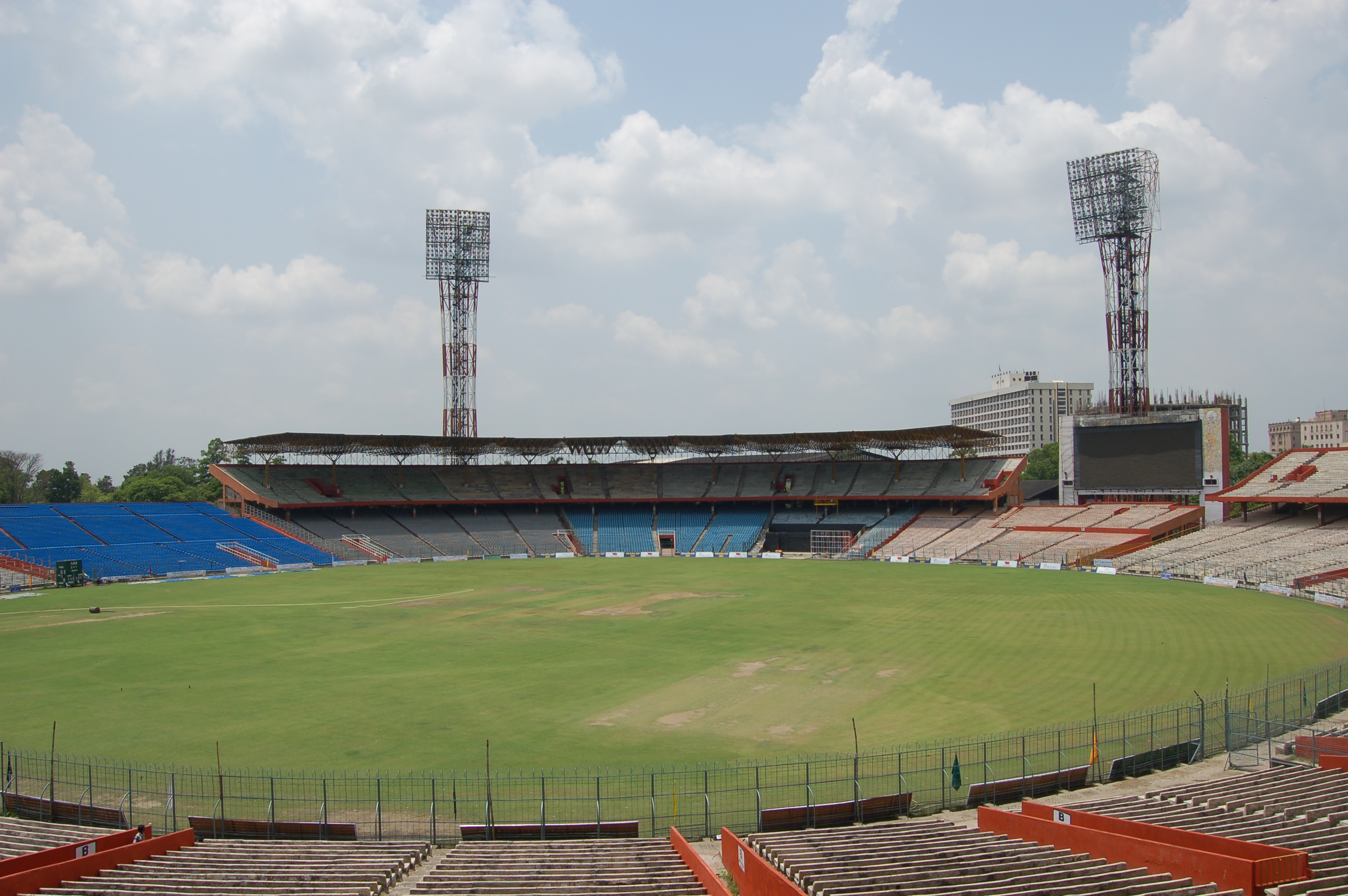
The ground before Cricket World Cup 2011 renovation.

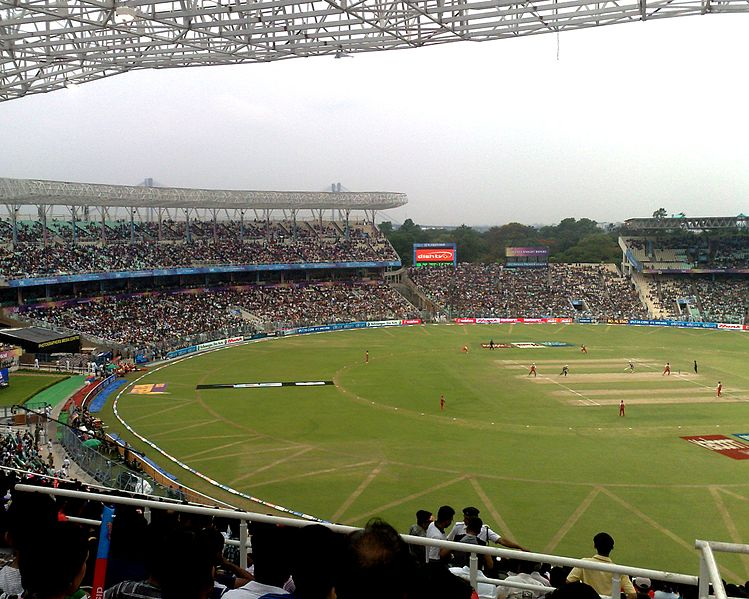
Eden Gardens after renovations.

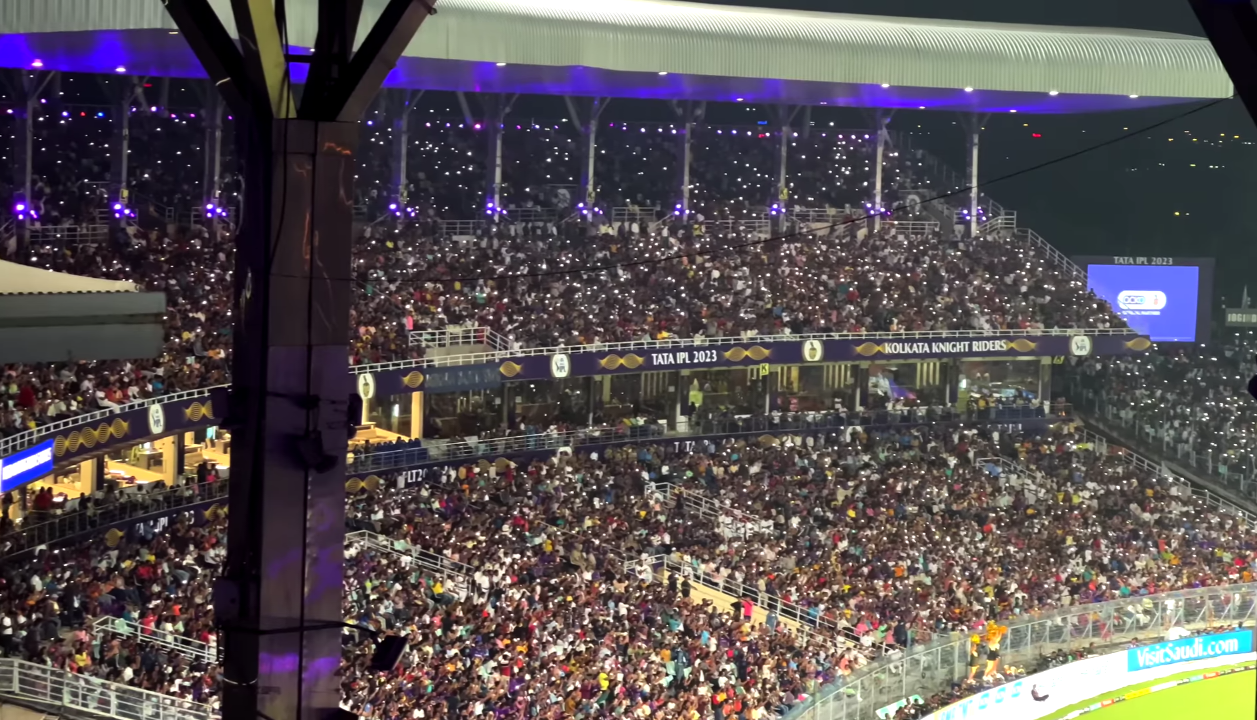
Night view of Eden Gardens

== Recent tournament results ==
=== Cricket World Cup ===
Year	Date	Team #1	Team #2	Round	Result
1987 Cricket World Cup	23 October 1987	Zimbabwe	New Zealand	Group Stage	New Zealand won by 4 wickets
1987 Cricket World Cup	8 November 1987	Australia	England	Final	Australia won by 7 runs
1996 Cricket World Cup	13 March 1996	Sri Lanka	India	Semi-Final	Sri Lanka won by default
2011 Cricket World Cup	15 March 2011	South Africa	Ireland	Group Stage	South Africa won by 131 runs
2011 Cricket World Cup	18 March 2011	Netherlands	Ireland	Group Stage	Ireland won by 6 wickets
2011 Cricket World Cup	20 March 2011	Zimbabwe	Kenya	Group Stage	Zimbabwe won by 161 runs
2023 Cricket World Cup	28 October 2023	Netherlands	Bangladesh	Group Stage	Netherlands won by 87 runs
2023 Cricket World Cup	31 October 2023	Bangladesh	Pakistan	Group Stage	Pakistan won by 7 wickets
2023 Cricket World Cup	5 November 2023	India	South Africa	Group Stage	India won by 243 runs
2023 Cricket World Cup	11 November 2023	England	Pakistan	Group Stage	England won by 93 runs
2023 Cricket World Cup	16 November 2023	South Africa	Australia	Semi-Final	Australia won by 3 wickets

=== ICC Men's T20 World Cup ===
Year	Date	Team #1	Team #2	Round	Result
2016 ICC World Twenty20	17 March 2016	Afghanistan	Sri Lanka	Super 10	Sri Lanka won by 6 wickets
2016 ICC World Twenty20	16 March 2016	Pakistan	Bangladesh	Super 10	Pakistan won by 55 runs
2016 ICC World Twenty20	19 March 2016	Pakistan	India	Super 10	India won by 6 wickets
2016 ICC World Twenty20	26 March 2016	New Zealand	Bangladesh	Super 10	New Zealand won by 75 runs
2016 ICC World Twenty20	3 April 2016	England	West Indies	Final	West Indies won by 4 wickets
2026 Men's T20 World Cup	7 February 2026	West Indies	Scotland	Round 1	West Indies won by 35 runs
2026 Men's T20 World Cup	9 February 2026	Scotland	Italy	Round 1	Scotland won by 73 runs
2026 Men's T20 World Cup	14 February 2026	Scotland	England	Round 1	England won by 5 wickets
2026 Men's T20 World Cup	16 February 2026	England	Italy	Round 1	England won by 24 runs
2026 Men's T20 World Cup	19 February 2026	West Indies	Italy	Round 1	West Indies won by 42 runs
2026 Men's T20 World Cup	1 March 2026	West Indies	India	Super 8	India won by 5 wickets
2026 Men's T20 World Cup	4 March 2026	South Africa	New Zealand	Semi-Final	New Zealand won by 9 wickets

=== Asia Cup ===
Year	Date	Team #1	Team #2	Round	Result
1990–91 Asia Cup	31 December 1990	Sri Lanka	Bangladesh	Group Stage	Sri Lanka won by 71 runs
1990–91 Asia Cup	4 January 1991	Sri Lanka	India	Final	India won by 7 wickets

== Cricket World Cup matches ==
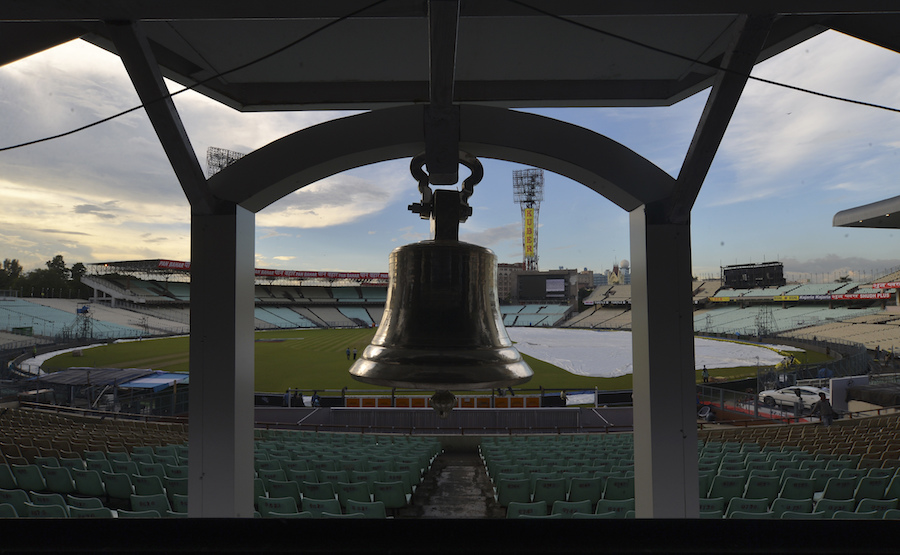
The Bell at the Eden Gardens

Eden Gardens has hosted 15 Cricket World Cup matches hosted in India across formats and men's and women's cricket. Eden Gardens has hosted 11 Cricket World Cup matches in 1987 (2 including the final), 1996 (1), 2011 (3) and 2023 (5, including a semi-final). The stadium hosted 5 T20I matches each during 2016 ICC World Twenty20 (including Finals) and 2026 Men's T20 World Cup (including Semi Finals). The stadium hosted 2 Women's Cricket World Cup matches - one each in 1978 and 1997 and one match of Women T20I match during the 2016 ICC Women's World Twenty20 tournament.

Eden Gardens has hosted 4 finals (1987 ODI CWC, 2016 T20I, 1997 Women's CWC and 2016 Women's T20I) and 2 semi-finals (1996 ODI CWC, 2023 ODI CWC).

=== 1987 ICC Cricket World Cup ===
23 October 1987
Scorecard

Zimbabwe; 227/4 (50 overs)	v	New Zealand; 229/6 (47.4 overs)
Kevin Arnott 51 (83); Stephen Boock 2/43 (10 overs)		Jeff Crowe 88* (105); Ali Shah 2/34 (10 overs)

New Zealand won by 4 wickets
Player of the match: Jeff Crowe (NZ)

==== Finals ====
8 November 1987
Scorecard

Australia; 253/5 (50 overs)	v	England; 246/8 (50 overs)
David Boon 75 (125); Eddie Hemmings 2/48 (10 overs)		Bill Athey 58 (103); Allan Border 2/38 (7 overs)

Australia won by 7 runs
Player of the match: David Boon (Aus)

=== 1996 ICC Cricket World Cup ===
13 March 1996
Scorecard

Sri Lanka; 251/8 (50 overs)	v	India; 120/8 (34.1 overs)

Sri Lanka won by default

- The match was awarded to Sri Lanka by match referee Clive Lloyd when play could not continue due to the rioting crowd.

=== 2011 ICC Cricket World Cup ===
Eden Gardens was meant to host a Group B Match between India and England on 27 February 2011. The ICC, however, stripped the stadium of the match after deciding that the renovation of the grounds would not be completed in time.

15 March 2011
14:30 (D/N)

South Africa; 272/7 (50 overs)	v	Ireland; 141 (33.2 overs)
JP Duminy 99 (103); John Mooney 1/36 (8 overs)		Gary Wilson 31 (48); Robin Peterson 3/32 (8 overs)

South Africa won by 131 runs
Umpires: Kumar Dharmasena (SL) and Billy Doctrove (WI)
Player of the match: JP Duminy (SA)

- Ireland won the toss and elected to field.

18 March 2011
09:30

Netherlands; 306 (50 overs)	v	Ireland; 307/4 (47.4 overs)
Ryan ten Doeschate 106 (108); Paul Stirling 2/51 (10 overs)		Paul Stirling 101 (72); Tom Cooper 2/31 (7 overs)

Ireland won by 6 wickets
Umpires: Billy Doctrove (WI) and Ian Gould (Eng)
Player of the match: Paul Stirling (Ire)

- Ireland won the toss and elected to field.

20 March 2011
09:30

Zimbabwe; 308/6 (50 overs)	v	Kenya; 147 (36 overs)
Craig Ervine 66 (54); Elijah Otieno 2/61 (10 overs)		Nehemiah Odhiambo 44* (47); Ray Price 2/20 (7 overs)

Zimbabwe won by 161 runs
Umpires: Asoka de Silva (SL) and Kumar Dharmasena (SL)
Player of the match: Craig Ervine (Zim)

- Zimbabwe won the toss and elected to bat.

=== 2023 ICC Cricket World Cup ===
28 October 2023
14:00 (D/N)
Scorecard

Netherlands; 229 (50 overs)	v	Bangladesh; 142 (42.2 overs)
Scott Edwards 68 (89); Mustafizur Rahman 2/36 (10 overs)		Mehidy Hasan 35 (40); Paul van Meekeren 4/23 (7.2 overs)

Netherlands won by 87 runs
Umpires: Joel Wilson (WI) and Paul Wilson (Aus)
Player of the match: Paul van Meekeren (Ned)

- Netherlands won the toss and elected to bat.

31 October 2023
14:00 (D/N)
Scorecard

Bangladesh; 204 (45.1 overs)	v	Pakistan; 205/3 (32.3 overs)
Mahmudullah 56 (70); Shaheen Afridi 3/23 (9 overs)		Fakhar Zaman 81 (74); Mehidy Hasan 3/60 (9 overs)

Pakistan won by 7 wickets
Umpires: Richard Kettleborough (Eng) and Nitin Menon (Ind)
Player of the match: Fakhar Zaman (Pak)

- Bangladesh won the toss and elected to bat.
- Shaheen Afridi (Pak) and Mehidy Hasan (Ban) both took their 100th wicket in ODIs.
- Bangladesh were eliminated as a result of this match.

5 November 2023
14:00 (D/N)
Scorecard

India; 326/5 (50 overs)	v	South Africa; 83 (27.1 overs)
Virat Kohli 101* (121); Keshav Maharaj 1/30 (10 overs)		Marco Jansen 14 (30); Ravindra Jadeja 5/33 (9 overs)

India won by 243 runs
Umpires: Kumar Dharmasena (SL) and Paul Reiffel (Aus)
Player of the match: Virat Kohli (Ind)

- India won the toss and elected to bat.
- Virat Kohli (Ind) equalled Sachin Tendulkar's record for the most centuries in ODIs (49).
- India confirmed their top position in league table with this win.
- South Africa's 83 was their lowest innings total in World Cups, lower than their 149 against Australia in 2007.
- South Africa's 243-run loss was their heaviest in ODIs, in terms of runs, surpassing their 182-run loss to Pakistan in 2002.

11 November 2023
14:00 (D/N)
Scorecard

England; 337/9 (50 overs)	v	Pakistan; 244 (43.3 overs)
Ben Stokes 84 (76); Haris Rauf 3/64 (10 overs)		Salman Ali Agha 51 (45); David Willey 3/56 (10 overs)

England won by 93 runs
Umpires: Rod Tucker (Aus) and Paul Wilson (Aus)
Player of the match: David Willey (Eng)

- England won the toss and elected to bat.
- As a result of this match, New Zealand qualified for the semi-finals and Pakistan were eliminated.

==== Semi-final ====
16 November 2023
14:00 (D/N)
Scorecard

South Africa; 212 (49.4 overs)	v	Australia; 215/7 (47.2 overs)
David Miller 101 (116); Mitchell Starc 3/34 (10 overs)		Travis Head 62 (48); Tabraiz Shamsi 2/42 (10 overs)

Australia won by 3 wickets
Umpires: Richard Kettleborough (Eng) and Nitin Menon (Ind)
Player of the match: Travis Head (Aus)

- South Africa won the toss and elected to bat.
- David Miller (SA) became the first South African to score a century in a World Cup knockout match.
- As a result, Australia qualified for the finals of the World Cup for the eighth time after 1975, 1987, 1996, 1999, 2003, 2007 and 2015.
- Quinton de Kock (SA) played in his last ODI.

=== 2016 ICC World Twenty20 ===
17 March
19:30 (D/N)
Scorecard

Afghanistan; 153/7 (20 overs)	v	Sri Lanka; 155/4 (18.5 overs)
Asghar Stanikzai 62 (47); Thisara Perera 3/33 (4 overs)		Tillakaratne Dilshan 83* (56); Mohammad Nabi 1/25 (4 overs)

Sri Lanka won by 6 wickets
Umpires: Bruce Oxenford (Aus) and Joel Wilson (WI)
Player of the match: Tillakaratne Dilshan (SL)

- Afghanistan won the toss and elected to bat.

16 March
15:00 (D/N)
Scorecard

Pakistan; 201/5 (20 overs)	v	Bangladesh; 146/6 (20 overs)
Mohammad Hafeez 64 (42); Taskin Ahmed 2/32 (4 overs)		Shakib Al Hasan 50* (40); Shahid Afridi 2/27 (4 overs)

Pakistan won by 55 runs
Umpires: Ian Gould (Eng) and Richard Kettleborough (Eng)
Player of the match: Shahid Afridi (Pak)

- Pakistan won the toss and elected to bat.
- Shakib Al Hasan became the second player for Bangladesh to pass 1,000 runs in T20Is.
- Shakib Al Hasan also became the second all-rounder to score 1,000 runs and take 50 wickets in T20Is.

19 March
19:30 (D/N)
Scorecard

Pakistan; 118/5 (18 overs)	v	India; 119/4 (15.5 overs)
Shoaib Malik 26 (16); Suresh Raina 1/4 (1 over)		Virat Kohli 55* (37); Mohammad Sami 2/17 (2 overs)

India won by 6 wickets
Umpires: Ian Gould (Eng) and Richard Kettleborough (Eng)
Player of the match: Virat Kohli (Ind)

- India won the toss and elected to field.
- The start of the match was delayed by a wet outfield and the game was reduced to 18 overs per side.
- This was India's eleventh victory against Pakistan in ICC World Cup matches across both ODI and T20I formats.
- Ahmed Shehzad became the fifth player for Pakistan to pass 1,000 runs in T20Is.

26 March
15:00 (D/N)
Scorecard

New Zealand; 145/8 (20 overs)	v	Bangladesh; 70 (15.4 overs)
Kane Williamson 42 (32); Mustafizur Rahman 5/22 (4 overs)		Shuvagata Hom 16* (17); Grant Elliott 3/12 (4 overs)

New Zealand won by 75 runs
Umpires: Johan Cloete (SA) and Michael Gough (Eng)
Player of the match: Kane Williamson (NZ)

- New Zealand won the toss and elected to bat.
- Henry Nicholls (NZ) made his T20I debut.
- Mustafizur Rahman became the second bowler for Bangladesh and 16th player overall to take a five-wicket haul in a T20I match.
- Bangladesh's total is their lowest total in a T20I match.
- Ten dismissals in this match were bowled, the most in a T20I match.

3 April
19:00 (D/N)
Scorecard

England; 155/9 (20 overs)	v	West Indies; 161/6 (19.4 overs)
Joe Root 54 (36); Carlos Brathwaite 3/23 (4 overs)		Marlon Samuels 85* (66); David Willey 3/20 (4 overs)

West Indies won by 4 wickets
Umpires: Kumar Dharmasena (SL) and Rod Tucker (Aus)
Player of the match: Marlon Samuels (WI)

- West Indies won the toss and elected to field.
- Marlon Samuels (WI) scored the highest total in a World T20 final.
- West Indies became the first team to win both the men's and women's World Twenty20s on the same day, with the women defeating Australia by 8 wickets.

=== 1978 ICC Women's Cricket World Cup ===
1 January 1978
(scorecard)

India; 63 (39.3 overs)	v	England; 65/1 (30.2 overs)

England won by 9 wickets

=== 1997 ICC Women's Cricket World Cup ===
29 December 1997
Scorecard

New Zealand; 164 (49.3 overs)	v	Australia; 165/5 (47.4 overs)

Australia won by 5 wickets

=== 2016 ICC Women's World Twenty20 ===
3 April
14:30
Scorecard

Australia; 148/5 (20 overs)	v	West Indies; 149/2 (19.3 overs)
Elyse Villani 52 (37); Deandra Dottin 2/33 (4 overs)		Hayley Matthews 66 (45); Kristen Beams 1/27 (4 overs)

West Indies won by 8 wickets
Umpires: Aleem Dar (Pak) and Richard Illingworth (Eng)
Player of the match: Hayley Matthews (WI)

- Australia won the toss and elected to bat.

=== First day/night test ===
22–26 November 2019 (D/N)
Scorecard

Bangladesh	v	India
106 (30.3 overs); Shadman Islam 29 (52); Ishant Sharma 5/22 (12 overs)		347/9d (89.4 overs); Virat Kohli 136 (194); Al-Amin Hossain 3/85 (22.4 overs)
195 (41.1 overs); Mushfiqur Rahim 74 (96); Umesh Yadav 5/53 (14.1 overs)

India won by an innings and 46 runs
Umpires: Marais Erasmus (SA) and Joel Wilson (WI)
Player of the match: Ishant Sharma (Ind)

- Bangladesh won the toss and elected to bat.

== Notable events ==
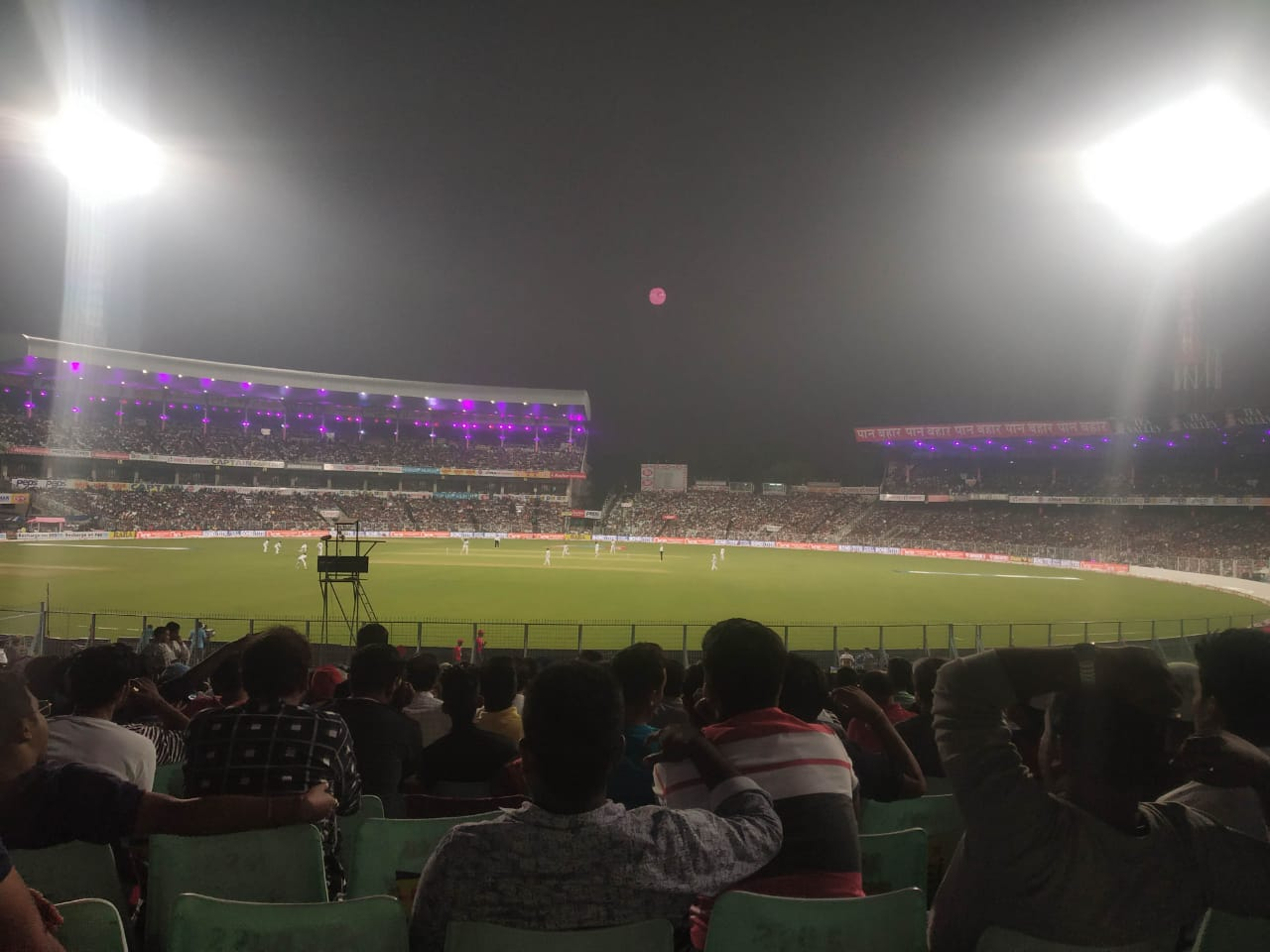
India's first ever day/night test match, held at Eden Garden on 22 November 2019

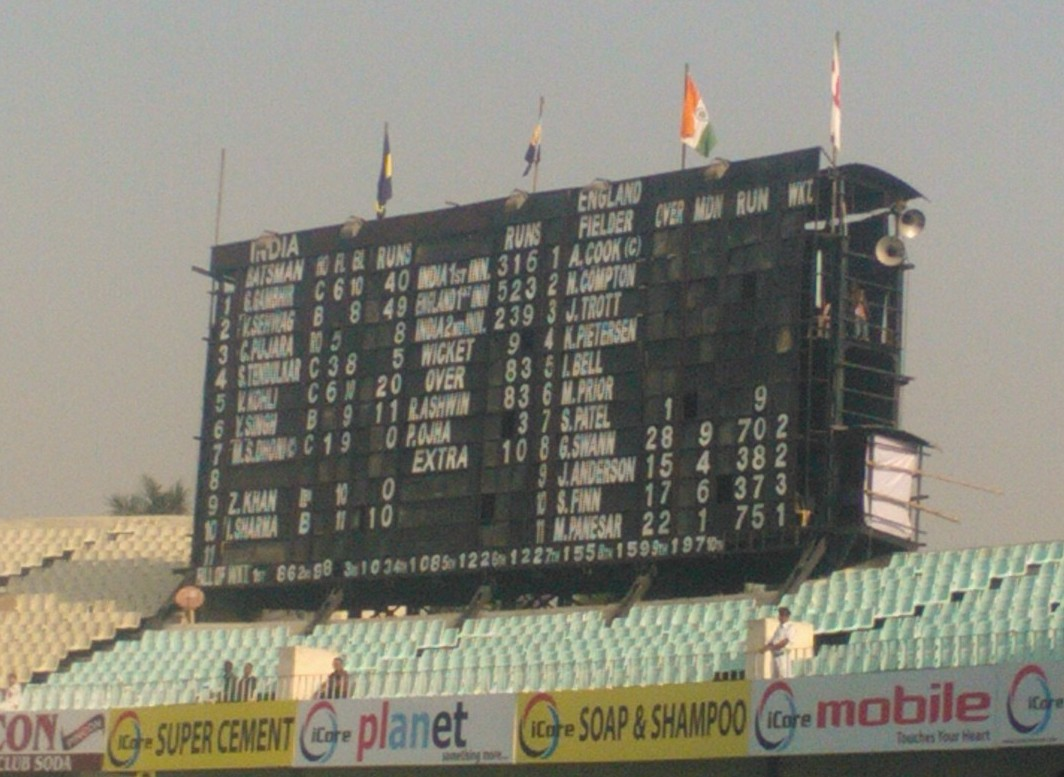
Eden Gardens Manual Scoreboard

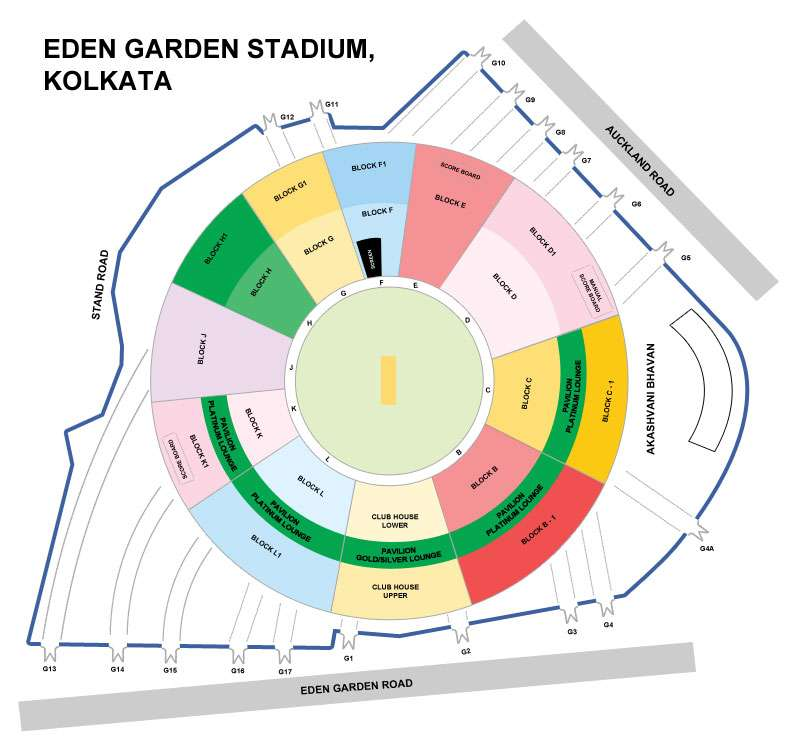
Eden Gardens Block Map

- In 1946, an in-form Syed Mushtaq Ali was dropped from the Indian team selected to play an unofficial test against Australian Services XI. Following crowd protests (with slogans like "No Mushtaq, No Test"), the selectors brought him back to play.
- Rioting occurred at the ground during the 1966/67 West Indies and 1969/70 Australian tours.
- In 1977, New York Cosmos played a Football match against Mohun Bagan at the stadium. Pelé played in that match for the Cosmos. The match was drawn at 2–2.
- 16 football fans died in a stampede after a derby league game between East Bengal and Mohun Bagan on 16 August 1980.
- Hosted Nehru Cup in 1984, where India national football team played against Argentina, Poland, China PR, Romania U-21 and Vasas Budapest.
- Eden Gardens hosted the 1987 Cricket World Cup Final which was first ever Cricket World Cup final hosted outside England. The match ended with Australia defeating England by 7 runs. This was the first time Australia won the Cricket World Cup Final.
- The 1996 Cricket World Cup semi-final was called off and Sri Lanka awarded the match after crowd disturbances following an Indian batting collapse.
- During the second final of the 1997 Pepsi Independence Cup, the Test and ODI captains of the Indian cricket team of all time (with a few notable exceptions) were given a lap of honour around the stadium.
- In 1999, leading Indian batsman Sachin Tendulkar was run out after colliding with Pakistan's Shoaib Akhtar. Akhtar had impeded Tendulkar and the crowd rioted, forcing the police to evict the spectators. The match continued in front of an empty stadium.
- Kapil Dev took an ODI hat-trick against the Sri Lankans in 1991 at the ground.
- Harbhajan Singh took a hat-trick against Australia in 2000/01 at the ground. He became the first Indian to take a hat-trick in Test cricket.
- In 2000/01, V.V.S. Laxman scored 281 against Australia in the Second Test, 2000–01 Border–Gavaskar Trophy. This remains the highest score at the ground. He was involved in a memorable 376 runs partnership with Rahul Dravid who scored 180. They batted through the whole day 4 of the test match without losing their wickets. Australia were defeated despite enforcing the follow-on. It was only the third time in Test history that a team had won after being forced to follow on. It is widely considered to be one of the greatest Test matches in cricket history.
- In 2005, in an ODI against South Africa, the Eden Gardens crowd booed the Indian team and Greg Chappell because of Sourav Ganguly's dropping from the team. Chappell was alleged to have made an obscene gesture towards the crowd from the team bus prior to the match.
- In 2005, Sachin Tendulkar scored his 10,000th run in Test Cricket against Pakistan on this ground making him the second Indian batsman and fifth overall to achieve this feat. Tendulkar Would Later go on to become the highest run scorer in Test Cricket.
- Eden Gardens hosted the historic 199th (penultimate) Test match of Sachin Tendulkar's career against West Indies from 6-10 Nov 2013. India defeated West Indies by an innings and 51 runs in 3 days.
- On its 150th anniversary, on 13 November 2014, Eden Gardens witnessed the highest ever score by a batsman in One Day Internationals, a 264 off 173 balls scored by Rohit Sharma during the fourth One Day International of Sri Lanka vs India at the venue.
- On 3 April 2016, in this venue, within a span of hours, the finals of the ICC world cup Twenty20 tournaments for the women and for the men were won by the respective women's and men's teams of the West Indies.
- The stadium hosted the 200th and 250th home tests for India in 2005 and 2016 respectively.
- On 22 January 2017, Ravindra Jadeja became the first Indian left arm spinner to take 150 One Day International wickets, when he dismissed Sam Billings.
- On 21 September 2017, Kuldeep Yadav became the third bowler for India to take a hat-trick in an ODI after Chetan Sharma and Kapil Dev. When he took a hat-trick against Australia.
- On 22 November 2019, India's first ever day/night test match between India and Bangladesh was hosted at Eden Gardens and the game was inaugurated jointly by the Chief Minister of West Bengal, Mamata Banerjee and the Prime Minister of Bangladesh, Sheikh Hasina.
- On 5 November 2023, during the Men's Cricket World Cup 2023 group stage match between India and South Africa, Virat Kohli scored his 49th ODI century equalling Sachin Tendulkar's record for the most number of centuries scored by an individual in ODI cricket.
- On 9 February 2026, Italy made their 2026 Men's T20 World Cup debut against Scotland.
- On 4 March 2026, New Zealand Opener Finn Allen scored 100* off 33 balls against South Africa to take New Zealand to the 2026 ICC Men's T20 World Cup Finals. This is the fastest Men's T20 World Cup century till date by any player and also the highest individual score in a T20 World Cup knockout match. He became the first player ever to score a century in a T20 World Cup knockout match (semi-final or final).

== Stats and records ==
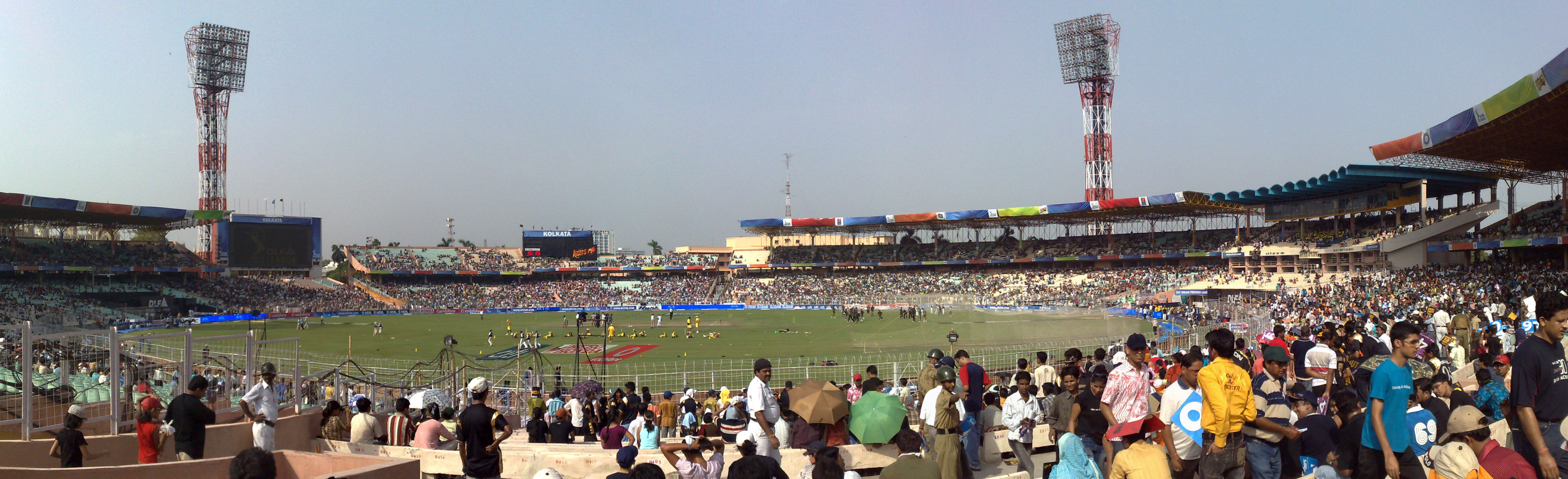
Panoramic View of the Eden Gardens Stadium during IPL 2008. Note that it was pre-renovation and had benches rather than individual seats. In this configuration, the stadium could seat over 98,000 fans on game day

=== Matches hosted ===
(as on 8 February 2026)

- Test — 43
- ODI — 36
- T20I — 13

=== Records ===
- The most runs in Test Matches played here are scored by V.V.S. Laxman (1217 runs), followed by Rahul Dravid (962 runs) and Sachin Tendulkar (872 runs). The most wickets taken here was by Harbhajan Singh (46 wickets) followed by Anil Kumble (40 wickets) and Bishen Singh Bedi (29 wickets).
- The most runs in ODIs scored here by a batsman is by Sachin Tendulkar (496 runs), followed by Virat Kohli (431 runs) and Mohammed Azharuddin (332 runs). The most wickets taken here is by Anil Kumble, Ravindra Jadeja and Kapil Dev (14 wickets each).
- VVS Laxman and Mohammed Azharuddin have scored 5 centuries each at this venue.
- The highest ever ODI individual score of 264 is made by Rohit Sharma on this ground against Sri Lanka in 2014.
- On 21 September 2017, Kuldeep Yadav became the third bowler for India to take a hat-trick in an ODI after Chetan Sharma and Kapil Dev. When he took a hat trick against Australia.
- The highest runs ever scored in IPL at Eden Gardens were scored on 23 April 2023. This was achieved by Chennai Super Kings against Kolkata Knight Riders. The score was 235/4, letting CSK win by 49 runs. Ajinkya Rahane hit a knock of 71 off of just 29 balls, handing CSK the win against KKR's 186/8, in spite of Jason Roy's 61 off 26 and Rinku Singh's 53 off 33.
- The lowest total in the history of IPL - RCB (49/10)
- Rajat Patidar hit the highest ever individual score in an IPL match at Eden Gardens with 112 (54 balls) during RCB v LSG in 2022
- Sunil Narine's 5/19 is the best bowling figures in the IPL at Eden Gardens.
- On 1 March 2026, during the Super 8 match of the 2026 ICC Men's T20 World Cup between India and West Indies, India chased down 196, surpassing their previous best successful chase of 173 against South Africa in 2014 in a T20 World Cup. This was also the highest successful chase ever recorded at this venue in the tournament's history.
- In the same match, Sanju Samson scored an unbeaten 97 and he broke Virat Kohli's record of 82* (set against Australia in 2016 and Pakistan in 2022) for the highest score by an Indian in a successful T20 World Cup chase.
- Finn Allen's 100* off 33 balls in the semi-finals of the 2026 ICC Men's T20 World Cup against South Africa on 4 March 2026 is the fastest century in Men's T20 World Cup by any player. It is also the highest individual score in a T20 World Cup knockout match. He became the first player ever to score a century in a T20 World Cup knockout match (semi-final or final).
- On 4 March 2026, New Zealand scored 84/0 in the first six overs in the 2026 ICC Men's T20 World Cup against South Africa, the highest ever powerplay score in a T20 World Cup knockout game. New Zealand won with 43 balls remaining, the second-largest margin (by balls left) in a T20 World Cup knockout, trailing only South Africa's win over Afghanistan in 2024 (67 balls).

Eden Gardens Records
Category	Test Matches	ODI Matches	T20I Matches
Highest Inning Score	657/d - India vs Australia (2001)	404/5 - India vs Sri Lanka (2014)	201/5 - Pakistan vs Bangladesh (2016)
Lowest Inning Score	90 - India vs West Indies (1983)	120/8 - India vs Sri Lanka (1996)	70 - Bangladesh vs New Zealand (2016)
Largest Victory - by Innings	Innings & 336 runs - West Indies vs India (1958)	—N/a	—N/a
Largest Victory - by Runs	329 runs - South Africa vs India (1996)	161 runs - Zimbabwe vs Kenya (2011)	75 runs - New Zealand vs Bangladesh (2016)
Largest Victory - by Wickets	10 Wickets - Australia vs India (1969)	10 Wickets - South Africa vs India (2005)	6 Wickets - England vs India (2011) and Sri Lanka vs Afghanistan (2016)
Largest Victory - by Balls Remaining	—N/a	90 balls - India vs Kenya (1998)	13 balls - India vs Pakistan (2016)
Narrowest Victory - by Runs	28 runs - India vs England (1972)	2 runs - India vs South Africa (1993)	55 runs - Pakistan vs Bangladesh (2016)
Narrowest Victory - by Wickets	7 Wickets - England vs India (2012)	2 Wickets - Pakistan vs India (1987)	4 Wickets - West Indies vs England (2016)
Narrowest Victory - by Balls Remaining	—N/a	1 ball - Pakistan vs West Indies (1989)	2 ball - West Indies vs England (2016)

== See also ==
- List of international cricket grounds in India
- List of cricket grounds by capacity
- List of stadiums in India
- Lists of stadiums

Events and tenants
Preceded by Lord's	Cricket World Cup; Final Venue; 1987	Succeeded by MCG
Preceded by Sher-e-Bangla	ICC World Twenty20; Final Venue; 2016	Succeeded by MCG
