= Kapil Dev =

Indian former cricket team captain (born 1959)

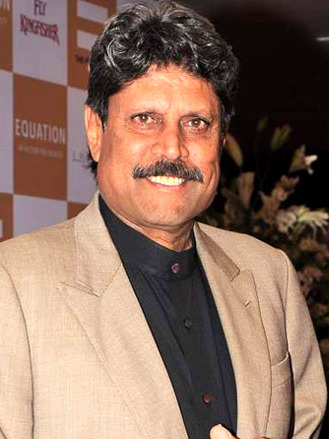
- Dev in 2014

Personal details
- Born: Kapil Dev Nikhanj; 6 January 1959 (age 67) Chandigarh, East Punjab, India
- Height: 183 cm (6 ft 0 in)
- Spouse: Romi Dev (m. 1980)
- Children: 1
- Awards: Padma Bhushan: 1991; Padma Shri: 1982
- Nickname(s): The Haryana Hurricane, Kaps

Military service
- Allegiance: India
- Branch/service: Indian Army
- Years of service: 2008–Present
- Rank: Honorary Lieutenant Colonel
- Unit: Territorial Army
- Cricket career

Cricket information
- Batting: Right-handed
- Bowling: Right arm fast-medium
- Role: All-rounder

International information
- National side: India (1978–1994)
- Test debut (cap 141): 16 October 1978 v Pakistan
- Last Test: 19 March 1994 v New Zealand
- ODI debut (cap 25): 1 October 1978 v Pakistan
- Last ODI: 17 October 1994 v West Indies

Domestic team information
- Years: Team
- 1975–1992: Haryana
- 1981–1983: Northamptonshire
- 1984–1985: Worcestershire

Head coaching information
- Years: Team
- 1999–2000: India

Career statistics
Competition	Test	ODI	FC	LA
Matches	131	225	275	309
Runs scored	5,248	3,783	11,356	5,461
Batting average	31.05	23.79	32.91	24.59
100s/50s	8/27	1/14	18/56	2/23
Top score	163	175*	193	175*
Balls bowled	27,740	11,202	48,853	14,947
Wickets	434	253	835	335
Bowling average	29.64	27.45	27.09	27.34
5 wickets in innings	23	1	39	2
10 wickets in match	2	0	3	0
Best bowling	9/83	5/43	9/83	5/43
Catches/stumpings	64/–	71/–	192/–	99/–
Medal record
Men's Cricket
Representing India
ICC Cricket World Cup
Winner	1983 England and Wales
ACC Asia Cup
Winner	1988 Bangladesh
Winner	1990–91 India
- Source: ESPNcricinfo, 24 January 2008

Kapildev Ramlal Nikhanj (pronunciation: [kəpil deːʋ] born 6 January 1959) is an Indian former cricket team captain. Regarded as one of the greatest all-rounders in the history of cricket, he was a fast-medium bowler and a hard-hitting middle-order batsman. Dev is the only player in the history of cricket to have taken more than 400 wickets (434 wickets) and scored more than 5,000 runs in Test cricket.

Dev was the captain of the Indian cricket team that won the 1983 Cricket World Cup. Dev is first captain of Indian heritage to win the Cricket World Cup. He is still the youngest captain (at the age of 24) to win the World Cup for any team. He retired in 1994, as the first player to take 200 ODI wickets, and holding the world record for the highest number of wickets taken in Test cricket, a record subsequently broken by Courtney Walsh in 2000. Kapil Dev held the record for the highest individual score (175*) scored by a batsman batting at number 5 or lower in ODIs until 2023, when it was superseded by Glenn Maxwell. He was also a part of the Indian squad which won the 1985 World Championship of Cricket.

After retiring, he coached the Indian national team between September 1999, and September 2000.

In 1982, Dev was awarded the Padma Shri, and in 1991 the Padma Bhushan. In 2002, he was named by Wisden as the Indian Cricketer of the Century. In 2010, Dev was inducted into the ICC Cricket Hall of Fame. In 2013, he received the C. K. Nayudu Lifetime Achievement Award, which is considered the highest honor conferred by the BCCI for retired professional cricket players.

== Early life ==
Kapil Dev Nikhanj was born in Chandigarh, on 6 January 1959, into a Punjabi Hindu family of Ram Lal Nikhanj, a teak merchant and his wife, Rajkumari. His family moved to Fazilka after the partition before eventually moving to Chandigarh. His paternal family is from Montgomery (now known as Sahiwal) and his mother was born in Pakpattan but raised in Okara, both now in Punjab, Pakistan. Dev was a student at D. A. V. College in Chandigarh.

== Domestic career ==
Dev made an impressive debut for Haryana in November 1975 against Punjab with a 6-wicket haul, restricting Punjab to just 63 runs and helping Haryana to victory. He finished the season with 121 wickets in 30 matches.

In the 1976–77 season opener against Jammu & Kashmir, he had a match haul of 8/36 in the win. While his contribution for the rest of that season was unremarkable, Haryana qualified for the pre-quarterfinals. Dev achieved his then best innings haul of 8/20 in just 9 overs in the second innings to skittle Bengal for 58 runs in under 19 overs. Haryana lost to Bombay in the quarter-finals.

He began his 1977–78 season claiming 8/38 in the first innings against Services. With 3 wickets in the second innings, he took his maiden 10-wicket haul in first-class cricket, a feat he would later achieve twice in Test cricket. With 23 wickets in 4 matches, he was selected for the Irani Trophy, Duleep Trophy and Wills Trophy matches.

In the 1978–79 season, Haryana had a repeat encounter with Bengal in the pre-quarterfinal match after a lacklustre season from Dev (12 wickets from 4 matches). He scored 2 half-centuries in the group stage matches. In the pre-quarterfinal match, he took a 5-wicket haul in the first innings. Poor batting by Haryana in the second innings let Bengal avenge their loss from 2 seasons back by scoring the required 161 runs for the loss of just 4 wickets. Dev stood out in the Irani Trophy match, scoring 62 runs and coming in at number 8. He took 5 catches in the game where Karnataka was defeated by the Rest of India XI. Dev arrived in the national spotlight with a standout performance in the finals of the Duleep Trophy, taking a first-innings haul of 7/65 in 24 overs. He was included in the North Zone squad for Deodhar Trophy and Wills Trophy for the first time. He played his first Test match in the season against Pakistan.

In the 1979–80 season, Dev showed his batting talent with a maiden century against Delhi when he scored his career-best 193. In the pre-quarterfinal match, where he captained Haryana for the first time against Uttar Pradesh, he took a five-wicket haul in the second innings to advance to quarterfinals, where they lost to Karnataka. With Dev cementing his place in the Indian national squad, his appearances in domestic matches dwindled.

=== 1990–91 Ranji Champions ===
In the 1990–91 Ranji season, Haryana rode into the semi-finals on the back of the bowling performance of Chetan Sharma and the batting performance of Amarjit Kaypee. Dev took center stage in the semi-final against Bengal, where he led his team to a Mammoth score of 605 runs by scoring 141 as well as taking 5 wickets.

The finals of the 1991 season will be remembered for the number of international cricketers who participated, including Dev, Chetan Sharma, Ajay Jadeja and Vijay Yadav turning up for Haryana and Bombay cricket team represented by Sanjay Manjrekar, Vinod Kambli, Sachin Tendulkar, Dilip Vengsarkar, Chandrakant Pandit, Salil Ankola and Abey Kuruvilla. Deepak Sharma (199), Ajay Jadeja (94), and Chetan Sharma (98) helped Haryana to a score of 522 while Yogendra Bhandari (5 wickets) and Dev (3 wickets) restricted Bombay to 410 runs in the first innings. A crucial 41 from Dev and top scorer Banerjee (60) took Haryana to 242 runs, setting Bombay a target of 355 runs. After the initial wickets, Vengsarkar (139) and Tendulkar (96) fought back for the Bombay team. After Tendulkar's dismissal, Haryana took the final 6 wickets for 102 runs and Vengsarkar and Bombay were stranded 3 runs short of the target. Dev won his maiden and only Ranji Trophy championship.

=== County Cricket ===
Dev played county cricket in England Northamptonshire between 1981 and 1983 and for Worcestershire during the 1984 and 1985 seasons. He played a total of 40 first-class matches in his country stint, and made 2,312 runs across 64 innings with 4 centuries and 14 half-centuries. Out of his 835 overall first-class wickets, 103 of those wickets came in county cricket.

== International career ==
A graph showing Kapil Dev's test career bowling statistics and how they have varied over time.

=== Early years (1978–1982) ===
Dev made his Test cricket debut in Faisalabad, Pakistan on 16 October 1978. Although his match figures were unimpressive, the numbers did not convey any measure of his contribution. He startled the Pakistani batsmen with his pace and bouncers that struck their helmets on more than one occasion. Dev captured his maiden wicket of Sadiq Mohammad with his trademark outswinger. He showcased his all-rounder talent when he scored India's fastest Test half-century off 33 balls and 2 sixes in each of the innings during the 3rd Test match at National Stadium, Karachi, although India lost the match and the series 2–0. In the ensuing series against a visiting West Indies team, he scored his maiden Test century (126) at Feroz Shah Kotla, Delhi in just 124 balls and had a steady bowling performance (17 wickets at 33.00). Ominous signs of Dev's liking for England showed up in the ensuring series, his first outside the sub-continent. He picked up his first 5-wicket haul and all of England's wickets, although it came at a huge cost (48 overs and 146 runs conceded) as England scored a mammoth 633 and won the match comfortably. Dev finished the series with 16 wickets though his batting haul of 45 runs (Average: 7.5) was unimpressive. His debut in ODI Cricket happened in the earlier tour of Pakistan where his individual performance was ordinary and it stayed the same as both Dev and India had a poor campaign at the 1979 Cricket World Cup.

Dev established himself as India's premier fast bowler when he took two 5-wicket hauls and ended the home series against Australia with 28 wickets (Average: 22.32) and also 212 runs that included a half-century. He gained fame in the 6-Test home series against Pakistan in the 1979–80 season when he led India to 2 victories against the visitors – once with the bat (69) at Wankhede Stadium, Bombay and the second time with bat and ball (10-wicket haul in match – 4/90 in the first innings and 7/56 in the second innings, 84 in 98 balls with his bat) at Chepauk, Madras (Now Chennai). Dev rates his all-round performance in this match as his career best and his second innings figure of 7/56 was his best to-date. During the series, he also became the youngest Test player to achieve the all-round double of 100 Wickets and 1000 Runs and in 25 matches (although Ian Botham took just 21 matches to achieve the same feat) and finished the series with 32 wickets (Ave: 17.68) and 278 runs that included 2 fifties.

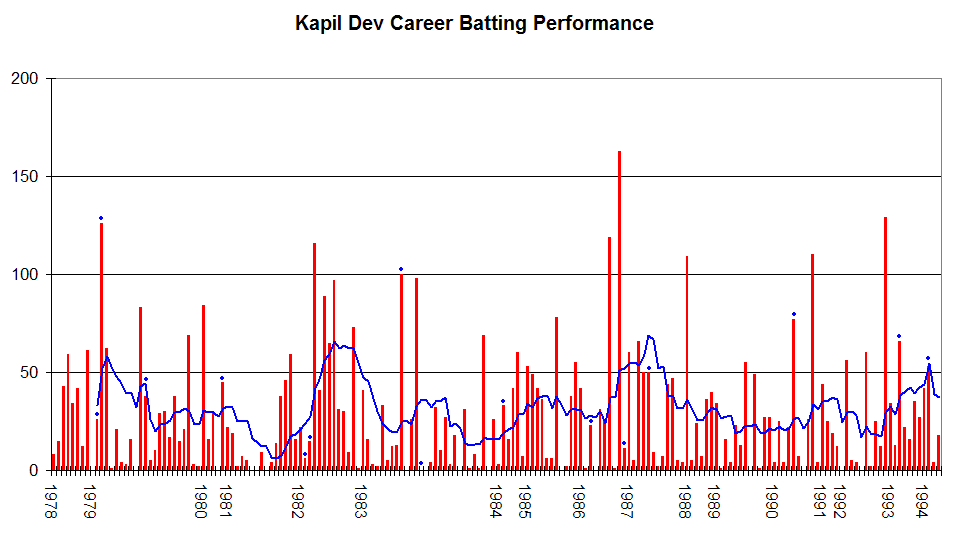
Dev's career performance graph.

India's tour of Australia in 1980–81 had the looks of the familiar Indian series as India were 1–0 down and were defending a meagre 143 runs and Dev virtually ruled out with a groin injury. When Australia finished the fourth day at 18/3, Dev willed himself to play the final day with pain-killing injections and removed the dangerous Australia middle order. Dev won the match for India with the innings bowling performance of 16.4–4–28–5, a bowling performance that figures in his five best bowling performance. During the Australian tour, he scored his first fifty in ODIs against New Zealand at Brisbane. Somehow India's Test cricket sensation was unable to adjust to ODI cricket and had a career start of 278 runs (Average: 17.38) and 17 wickets after 16 ODI matches.

After a disappointing New Zealand tour for India, Dev was ready for the 1981–82 home series against England where his five-wicket haul won the first test at Wankhede Stadium, Bombay. He scored 318 runs (Average: 53, 1 century, 1 fifty) and took 22 wickets (2 5-wicket hauls) and walked away with the Man of the Series honours. England saw more of Dev in the ensuing series at home against the Indian cricket team in the 1982 season when he opened with a 5-wicket haul and 130 runs in a losing cause at Lord's. He finished the 3-match series with 292 runs (Ave: 73, 3 fifties) and 10 Wickets and bagged the Man of the Series again.

Facing Sri Lanka for the first time, Dev helped himself to a five-wicket haul to kick start the 1982–83 season. In the following tour to Pakistan, Dev and Mohinder Amarnath were the only bright spots in a series dominated by rival all-rounder Imran Khan (40 wickets and 1 century). Dev took a 5/102 haul in the second Test at National Stadium, Karachi, 7/220 in the third Test at Iqbal Stadium, Faisalabad and 8/85 at Gaddafi Stadium, Lahore while he received little support from other team members. After this disastrous tour, Dev was made the captain of the Indian cricket team in place of Sunil Gavaskar.

=== Captain: 1983 World Cup Champions (1982–1984) ===
Dev debuted as India's captain in the 1982–83 season against Sri Lanka (before the Pakistan tour) when Gavaskar was rested. His first assignment as regular captain was the tour of West Indies, where the biggest accomplishment was a lone ODI victory. Dev (72) and Gavaskar (90) led India to a huge score – 282/5 in 47 overs and Dev's 2 wickets aided India to restrict West Indies for 255 and a victory that Indian cricketers claim gave them the confidence to face the West Indies team in 1983 Cricket World Cup. Overall, Dev had a good series in West Indies as he scored a century to save the second test match as well as picking up 17 wickets (Average: 24.94).

==== 1983 World Cup performance ====
Dev entered the World Cup with an ordinary individual record – 32 Matches, 608 Runs (Average: 21), 34 wickets. India's solitary victory in the previous two World Cups was against East Africa in 1975. Riding on Yashpal Sharma (89 Runs), Roger Binny and Ravi Shastri (3 wickets each), India inflicted the West Indies' first-ever defeat in the World Cup. Following a victory against Zimbabwe, India lost the next two matches – Australia (despite Dev's best career figures of 5/43) and West Indies. India now needed victories against Australia and Zimbabwe to advance to the semifinals.

India faced Zimbabwe at Nevill Ground, Royal Tunbridge Wells on 18 June 1983. After falling behind, Dev, batting with the lower order batsmen, stabilised the team with help from Roger Binny (22 runs) and Madan Lal. Kapil's half-century came off in 72 balls. After the lunch break, he raised the tempo, racing to his hundred off an even 100 balls. His final 38 balls raised 75. Together with Kirmani (24 runs), Dev put on an unbeaten 126 runs for the 9th wicket – a world record that stood unbroken for 27 years (10,000 days), and finished not out with 175 runs off 138 balls, an innings that included 16 boundaries and 6 sixes. The innings figures in the Top 10 ODI Batting Performances at No. 4. India won the match by 31 runs.

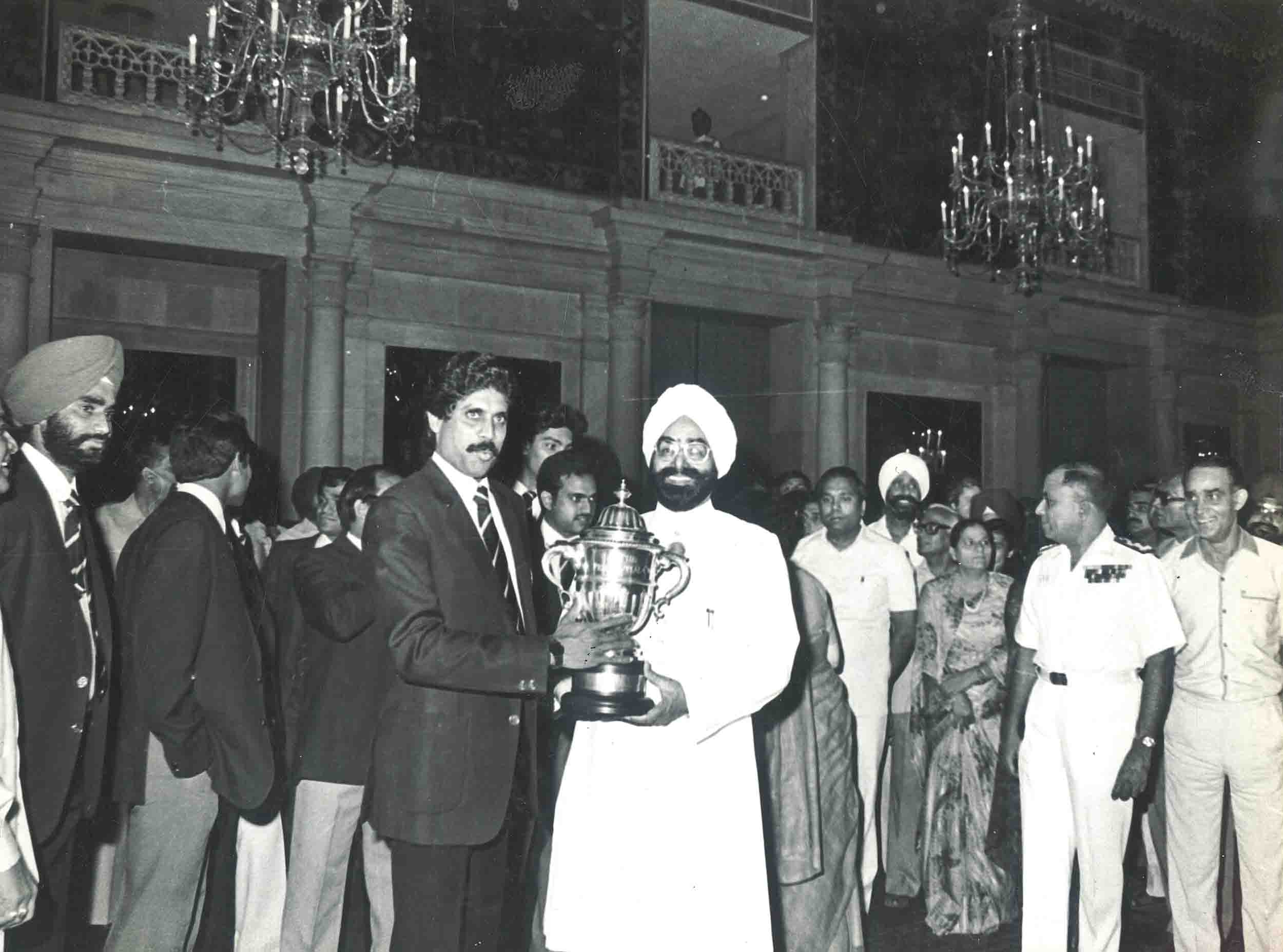
Dev with the Indian President Zail Singh after the team's return to India post winning the World Cup. They are holding the Cricket World Cup Trophy.

India faced the English cricket team in the semifinals. Dev helped curtail the lower order after England lost regular wickets to Binny and Amarnath. He took 3 wickets as India limited England to 213 and the middle order of Amarnath (46 runs), Yashpal Sharma (61) and Sandeep Patil (51*) ensured victory and entry into the finals to take on the West Indies cricket team who were looking for a hat-trick of World Cup titles. West Indies restricted India for 183 runs, with only Krishnamachari Srikkanth (38 runs) providing some scoring relief. Despite losing Gordon Greenidge, West Indies steadied their innings to 57/2 on the back of quick scoring by Viv Richards. Richards played one too many aggressive shots when he skied a pull shot from Madan Lal that Dev caught at deep square leg after running backward for over 20 yards. The catch is attributed as the turning point in the 1983 WC Final and is regarded as one of the finest in ODI Cricket. West Indies collapsed from 50/1 to 76/6 and finally were bowled out for 140 with Dev picking up the wicket of Andy Roberts and Mohinder Amarnath picking up the final wicket of Michael Holding. The win was India's maiden World Cup and he led with 303 runs (Average: 60.6), 12 wickets (Average: 20.41) and 7 catches in 8 matches. This moment inspired several cricketers all over India, including Sachin Tendulkar

=== Post-World Cup ===
After the World Cup, India hosted the West Indies cricket team and lost the Test series 3–0 and the ODI Series 5–0. Dev achieved his best test bowling performance in a loss at Motera Stadium, Ahmedabad with a return of 9/83. His bowling performance in the test and ODI series was let down by his poor batting performance. The selectors ended Dev's reign by reappointing Gavaskar as captain in early 1984.

=== Return to captaincy (1985–87) ===
Dev returned to captaincy in 1986 after Gavaskar stepped down as captain after India won the Benson & Hedges World Championship of Cricket after beating arch-rivals Pakistan in the final under Gavaskar’s leadership. This success was followed another big victory as India beat Australia in the finals of Rothmans Four-Nations Cup. The following year he guided India on a Test series win over England in England in 1986 as his team won 2–0. This period saw one of his most famous matches, the second Tied Test, in which he was named joint-man of the match with Australian batsman Dean Jones.

He was retained as captain for the 1987 Cricket World Cup. In their first match, Australia scored 268 against India. However, after the close of innings, Dev agreed with the umpires that the score should be increased to 270 as one boundary during the innings had been mistakenly signalled as a four and not a six. In their reply, India scored 269 falling short of Australia's score by one run. In the Wisden Cricketer's Almanack, it was reported that "Kapil Dev's sportsmanship proved the deciding factor in a close-run match". India went on to reach the semi-final of the 1987 World Cup, where they lost to England. Dev faced the blame for India's defeat as he holed out to deep mid-wicket triggering a collapse that led to the unexpected loss. He did not captain India again, although he was the Vice-captain for India's tour to Pakistan in 1989.

The captaincy period was on the whole a difficult one for him as it was mired with reports of differences with Gavaskar, as well as his own inconsistent form as a bowler. However, both men later insisted that these reports were exaggerated. Dev's performance as Captain was better than as a player.

=== Skills ===
Dev was a right-arm pace bowler noted for his graceful action and potent outswinger, and was India's main strike bowler for most of his career. He developed a fine inswinging yorker during the 1980s, which he used very effectively against tail-enders. As a batsman, he was a natural striker of the ball who could hook and drive effectively. A naturally aggressive player, he often helped India in difficult situations by taking the attack to the opposition. Nicknamed The Haryana Hurricane, he represented the Haryana cricket team in domestic cricket.

=== Bowling style ===
Dev was a fast bowler. However, a fluent run-up and a gather that was perfectly side-on at the time of delivery meant that the outswinger came naturally to him. Usually bowled at a length and direction that always troubled right-handers, his delivery was the bane of most of his victims as he sought to beat the bat on the outside edge, either caught on the off-side cordon or indeed LBW and bowled in case the ball missed the edge. The side-on action meant that, for the first few years, this was the only delivery he could bowl. The deliveries that held their lines or came into the right-hander came through natural variations off the pitch. However, as he gained maturity, the action became less side-on and he developed an inswinger too. He noted in the mid-1980s that the only delivery he could not bowl at will was the leg-cutter.

By the end of 1983, Dev already had about 250 Test wickets in just five years and looked well on his way to becoming one of the most prolific wicket-takers ever. However, his bowling declined following knee surgery in 1984, as he lost some of his jump at the crease. Despite this setback, he never missed playing a single test or one-day game on fitness grounds. Though he lost some of his bite, he remained an effective bowler for another ten years and became the second bowler ever to take 400 wickets in Test cricket in 1991–92 when he took Mark Taylor's wicket in a series versus Australia in Australia. In that Australian tour he took 25 wickets.

=== Final years ===
Dev continued as India's lead pace bowler under a succession of captains in the early 1990s. He was involved in a notable incident during the Lord's Test Match of 1990, when he hit off-spinner Eddie Hemmings for four sixes in succession to take India past the follow-on target. This match featured the highest test score by an Englishman against India, 333 by Graham Gooch. Dev was cited by umpire Dickie Bird as being one of the greatest all-rounders of all time.

He became a valuable batsman in the ODI version of the game, as a pinch-hitter used to accelerate the run-scoring rate, usually in the final ten overs, and was relied upon to stabilise the innings in the event of a collapse. He played in the 1992 Cricket World Cup, his last, under the captaincy of Mohammad Azharuddin and topped the batting strike rate with 125.80 runs per 100 balls. He led the bowling attack with younger talents like Javagal Srinath and Manoj Prabhakar, who would eventually succeed him as India's leading pace bowlers. He retired in 1994, after breaking Richard Hadlee's then standing record for the most Test wickets taken.

=== List of centuries by opponent ===
	Team	Test	ODI	Total
1	West Indies	3	0	3
2	England	2	0	2
3	Australia	1	0	1
4	Sri Lanka	1	0	1
5	South Africa	1	0	1
6	Zimbabwe	0	1	1
Total		8	1	9

== Coaching career ==
Dev was appointed the Indian national cricket coach in September 1999 following the appointment of Sachin Tendulkar as captain of the Indian team in August 1999. The team saw success in his first series at home against New Zealand but saw whitewash in the subsequent test series against host tour of Australia and visitors South Africa, India's first home series loss in 12 years. India's 3–2 win in the subsequent ODI series under new captain Sourav Ganguly is remembered for the claims of match-fixing against South Africa's captain Hansie Cronje.

As the match-fixing scandal took centrestage, former player Manoj Prabhakar accused Kapil Dev of trying to bribe him in 1994 during a tournament in Sri Lanka. Under severe pressure from politicians and fans, Kapil Dev resigned as coach in September 2000, after having spent less than one year as the team coach. The reports of CBI (India's premier investigating agency) and K. Madhavan (appointed by BCCI to investigate match-fixing allegations) in November 2000 exonerated Kapil Dev of any involvement in match-fixing. India's performance in the coaching stint of Kapil Dev was below-par, winning just one Test match (out of 8 played) and 9 ODIs (out of 25 played).

=== India's performance under Kapil's Coaching ===
==== New Zealand tour of India ====
Kapil Dev was appointed coach of the Indian national cricket team in 1999 succeeding Anshuman Gaekwad. His appointment coincided with the second term of captaincy for Tendulkar. Kapil's first international competition as India's coach started badly with the team bowled out for 83 all out against the visiting New Zealand team in Mohali. Due to an inspired bowling display by Javagal Srinath, the lead was restricted to 132 runs after New Zealand were dismissed for 215. India's batsmen bounced back in the second innings with a total of 505 with all the top five batsmen passing fifty and Rahul Dravid and Tendulkar scoring centuries. Anil Kumble's ten-wicket match haul at Kanpur enabled India to win the second Test match. The Third Test ended in a draw, with Tendulkar recording his first double-century in Test Cricket. In the ensuing ODI Series, India won 3–2 and the highlight for Indian team was a world record ODI partnership of 331 runs between Dravid and Tendulkar in the 2nd match at Hyderabad. The series against New Zealand would be Kapil's most successful series as national coach.

==== Indian tour of Australia ====
India followed the NZ tour with a trip to Australia. India lost the Test series 3–0 and the margin of defeat was heavy in each of these matches – 285 runs, 180 runs, innings and 141 runs. The highlight of the Test series came in the final Test when V. V. S. Laxman scored 167 at a run a ball in fading light at the Sydney Cricket Ground and came for much praise from the media. India's ODI series performance matched the Test series in failure as India managed to win just one match against Pakistan and Kapil had to come out in defence of his team.

==== South Africa tour of India ====
India had not lost a home test series since 1987 (against Pakistan) and when South Africa toured India in February – March 2000, that streak was ended as India lost the home series 2–0. However events outside the field overshadowed the cricket: Before start of the series, Tendulkar announced his decision to relinquish the captaincy after the Test matches, Azharuddin and Mongia were recalled to the team, controversy arose over Azharuddin's injury leading to his exclusion from the First Test. Ganguly was made the captain of the Indian team for the one-day series. Talks in the media about no way but 'UP' were not unfounded when India took a 2–0 lead in the ODI Series and finishing the series at 3–2, after South Africa won the last two matches. It was learnt later that South Africa's captain Cronje was involved in betting and there were attempts to buy-off South African players by Cronje and bookmakers. At the end of the series, the media felt that Ganguly's attitude and captaincy was heartening. In March 2000, India participated in a triangular series with South Africa and Pakistan. India won only one of their four matches and missed the finals.

=== Legacy of Kapil's coaching ===
Kapil's term as Indian cricket team's national coach was not considered a success due to poor on-field performances. During Kapil's reign as National Coach, India performed badly in away matches and managed just 3 victories in 15 games (20%) in ODI Tournaments. In Test cricket, India lost its first home series in 13 years and managed just 1 victory in 3 Test series.

Indian Performance with Kapil Dev as Coach
Matches	Total	Won	Lost	Draw/Tie	% Win
Test Cricket	8	1	5	2	12.5%
ODI matches	25	9	16	0	36%

== Match fixing allegation and resignation ==
=== Background ===
As the 1999/00 cricket season was winding down, the Delhi Police shocked the cricket world when they announced that Cronje was involved in a "Cricket Match-fixing and Betting Racket". The UCBSA released terse statements denying the allegations triggering a diplomatic row. When Delhi Police began mounting evidence, Cronje admitted to accepting money for throwing away games in a phone call with UCBSA's chief Ali Bacher. Cronje was sacked and replaced by Shaun Pollock.

=== Manoj Prabhakar's allegations ===
Allegations against Dev were based on the testimony of former Indian cricketer Manoj Prabhakar who claimed that Dev wanted him to throw a match against Pakistan in the 1994 Singer Cup in Colombo. Prabhakar had previously alleged that he was offered money to throw this game to the Outlook in 1997, however he did not mention who made him this offer. Based on these allegations, BCCI instituted the Chandrachud Inquiry, a one-man commission headed by retired Chief Justice of India Yeshwant Vishnu Chandrachud. Prabhakar did not reveal names or provide evidence of his charges (match fixing and phone tapping allegation on then cricket manager Ajit Wadekar). When the match fixing controversy resurfaced in 2000, BCCI released the Chandrachud Report to the media. The reaction of the Indian public resulted in PILs and International Cricket Council and the BCCI were called to respond in the Delhi and Calcutta High Courts. In response to the crisis, the Indian government initiated a CBI inquiry on 28 April 2000. Former BCCI President Inderjit Singh Bindra revealed on 4 May 2000 that Prabhakar told him that Dev asked him to throw away the match. Amidst these inquiries, Kapil Dev appeared for an interview on BBC's Hard Talk with Karan Thapar, where while defending himself against these allegations, he broke down in tears.

=== Kapil's resignation ===
Kapil initially did not resign or take a leave of absence, from his coaching responsibilities. As the weeks progressed and as public discontent mounting on inaction in the match-fixing scandal and in no small measure the pressure from the then Union Sport Minister Shukdev Singh Dhindsa, Kapil Dev resigned from his position of Indian Cricket Coach on 12 September 2000 vowing farewell to the game of cricket.

=== Clearing of match-fixing charges ===
After extensive investigation and interviews, the CBI submitted its report to Union Sports Minister on 1 November 2000. The report found that there was "no credible evidence" against Kapil. The BCCI's anti-corruption officer K Madhavan (former Joint Director of CBI) submitted his report on 28 November 2000 in which he elaborated on players who were found to have links with the match-fixing syndicate. Madhavan concluded that Kapil did not attempt to bribe Prabhakar and none of the players corroborated with Prabhakar's version of the events.

== Post retirement as player and coach ==
=== Return ===
After a period of silence away from the public eye, Dev returned to cricket when Wisden announced him as one of the sixteen finalists for the Wisden Indian Cricketer of the Century award in July 2002. Dev pipped longtime teammate Gavaskar and crowd favourite Tendulkar to win the award and claimed the moment as "my finest hour".

Dev slowly returned to cricket as a bowling consultant and was the bowling coach in the preparatory camp prior to India's tour of Pakistan in March 2004. In October 2006, he was nominated as the chairman of National Cricket Academy for a two-year period.

In 2005, he acted in a brief role in the cult film Iqbal written by Vipul K. Rawal where he played himself. Initially the director was not keen on approaching him; however, writer Rawal insisted as the role was written with him in mind.

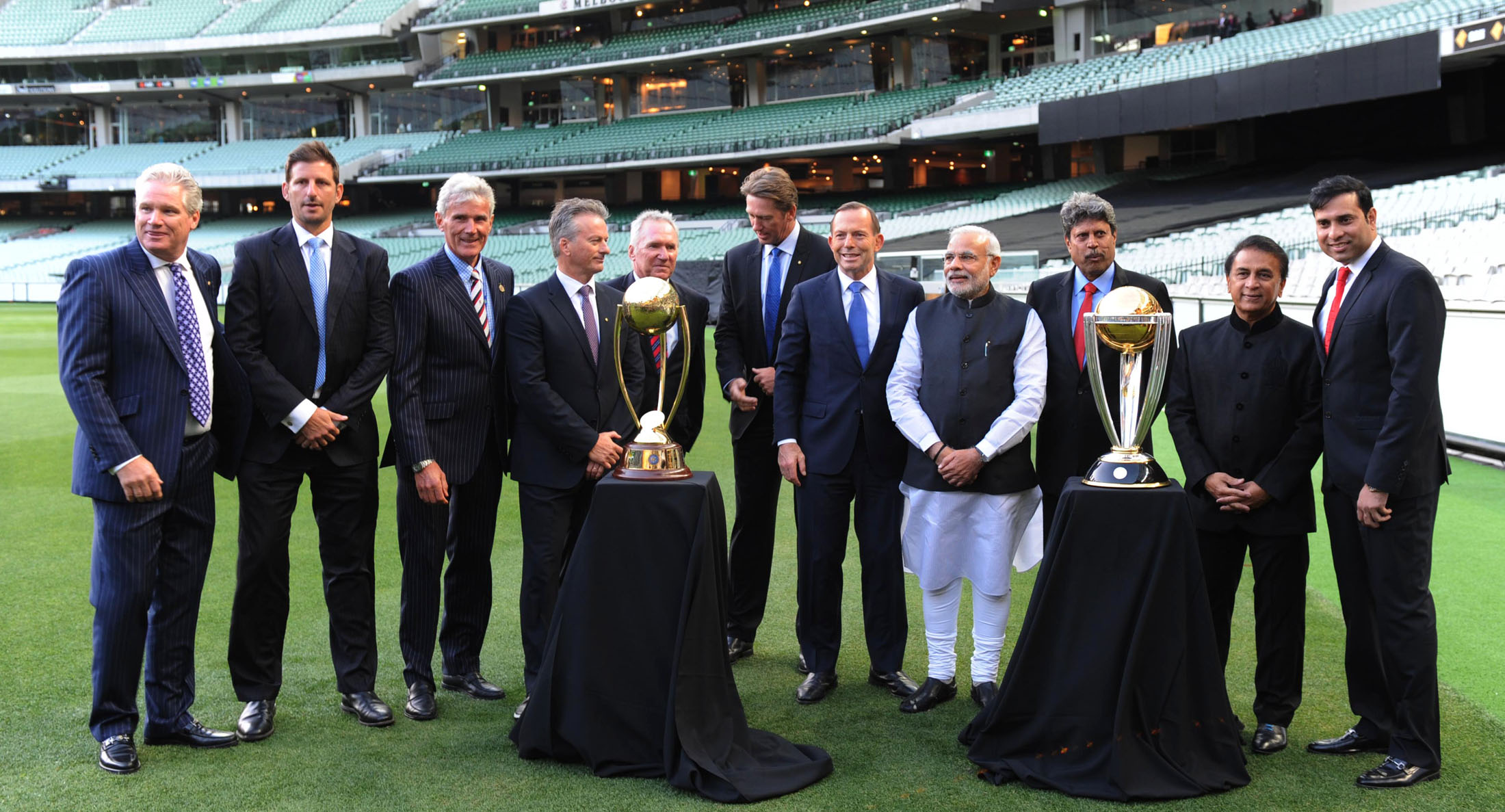
Dev with Indian PM Narendra Modi, Australian PM Tony Abbott, Sunil Gavaskar and VVS Laxman along with the Cricket World Cup Trophy and Border–Gavaskar Trophy at the Melbourne Cricket Ground in 2014.

In May 2007, Dev joined the upstart Indian Cricket League (ICL) floated by Zee TV as the chairman of executive board, defending his decision as complimenting BCCI's structure rather than opposing it – "We are not looking to create a rival team but helping the Indian board to find more talent". In June 2007, BCCI responded by revoking the pension for all players who had joined ICL, including Dev. On 21 August 2007, Dev was removed from the chairmanship of the National Cricket Academy, a day after he addressed a formal press conference of the new Indian Cricket League.

On 25 July 2012 Dev resigned from ICL and continued to support BCCI, thereby paving way to get back into the BCCI fold.

=== Chancellor of Haryana's Sports University ===
He was appointed as first chancellor of the Sports University of Haryana in 2019. The university is situated in India's Haryana state which he represented in domestic cricket.

== Personal life ==
Dev married Romi Bhatia in 1980 with whom he has a daughter, Amiya Dev, born on 16 January 1996.

In 1993, Dev took up golf. Dev was the only Asian founding member of Laureus Foundation in 2000. Ian Botham and Viv Richards were the other two cricketers on the founding member council of 40. Steve Waugh was added to the academy members in 2006 when it was expanded from 40 to 42. Dev pledged his organs during an event organised by Delhi Urological Society on 31 January 2014 at the Airport Authority of India, Officers Club, New Delhi.

On 23 October 2020, Dev suffered a heart attack and was hospitalised. He underwent an emergency coronary angioplasty at a hospital in Delhi.

== Books ==
He has written four books – three autobiographical and one book on Sikhism. Autobiographical works include — By God's Decree (with Vinay Verma) which came out in 1985, Cricket My Style in 1987, and Straight from the Heart in 2004. His latest book titled We, The Sikhs (with Ajay Sethi) was released in 2019.

== Records and awards ==
=== Captaincy record ===
==== Test matches ====
Opposition	Matches	Won	Lost	Tied	Draw
Australia	6	0	0	1	5
England	3	2	0	0	1
Pakistan	8	0	1	0	7
Sri Lanka	6	2	1	0	3
West Indies	11	0	5	0	6
Total	34	4	7	1	22

==== One Day Internationals ====
Opposition	Matches	Won	Lost	Tied	NR
Australia	19	9	9	0	1
England	5	3	2	0	0
New Zealand	8	6	2	0	0
Pakistan	13	4	9	0	0
Sri Lanka	13	10	2	0	1
West Indies	12	3	9	0	0
Zimbabwe	4	4	0	0	0
Total	74	39	33	0	2

=== Test cricket ===
- In early 1994, he became the highest Test wicket-taker in the world, breaking the record held by Sir Richard Hadlee. Dev's record was broken by Courtney Walsh in 1999.
- Only player to have achieved the all-rounder's double of 5,000 Test runs and 400 Test wickets

=== Awards ===
- 1979–80 – Arjuna Award
- 1982 – Padma Shri
- 1983 – Wisden Cricketer of the Year
- 1991 – Padma Bhushan
- 2002 – Wisden Indian Cricketer of the Century
- 2010 – ICC Cricket Hall of Fame
- 2013 – The 25 Greatest Global Living Legends in India by NDTV
- 2013 – CK Nayudu Lifetime Achievement award
- 2019 – Bharat Gaurav Award

== Filmography ==
Year	Film	Role	Note
1994	Dillagi... Yeh Dillagi	Himself	
2003	C.I.D.	Himself	Episode 289-290: "Howzzat?"
2004	Mujhse Shaadi Karogi	Himself	
2005	Iqbal	Himself	
2007	Chain Kulii Ki Main Kulii	Himself	
2021	83	Man in stadium	
2022	Double XL	Himself	
2024	Lal Salaam	Himself	Tamil film

== In popular culture ==
Dev made cameo appearances in the films Dillagi... Yeh Dillagi, Iqbal, Chain Khuli ki Main Khuli and Mujhse Shaadi Karogi among others. He has also released a song "One India My India" with Shailendra Singh.

The 2016 Indian film Azhar, directed by Tony D'Souza, revolves around Match fixing scandals in late 90s and 2000. In the film Dev's character was played by Varun Badola. Indian filmmaker Kabir Khan directed a biopic film, titled 83, about India's first world cup win in 1983. The film features Ranveer Singh as Dev and is produced by Anurag Kashyap and Kapil Dev has a cameo as a spectator.

Sporting positions
Preceded by Anshuman Gaekwad	Indian National Cricket Coach; October 1999 – September 2000	Succeeded by Anshuman Gaekwad
Preceded by Sunil Gavaskar	Indian National Test Cricket Captain; 1982–83 to 1983–84	Succeeded by Sunil Gavaskar
Preceded by Sunil Gavaskar	Indian National Test Cricket Captain; 1984–85 to 1986–87	Succeeded by Dilip Vengsarkar
Records
Preceded by Richard Hadlee	World Record – Most Career Wickets in Test cricket 434 wickets (29.64) in 131 Tests; Held record 8 February 1994 to 27 March 2000	Succeeded by Courtney Walsh
