= Cricket World Cup hosts =

- Organised by: International Cricket Council
- Participants: All Cricket Playing teams Full and Associate members teams in World; Qualified Teams play in World Cup Main event (tournament)

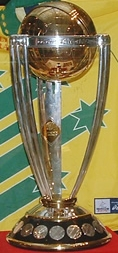
The Cricket World Cup Trophy.

The International Cricket Council's executive committee votes for the hosts of the tournament after examining the bids made by the nations keen to hold the Cricket World Cup. All of the World Cup events so far have been held in nations in which cricket is a popular sport. Most of the tournaments have been jointly hosted by nations from the same geographical region, such as Europe (mainly the United Kingdom) in 1975, 1979, 1983, 1999 and 2019; Asia (mainly South Asia) in 1987, 1996, 2011 and 2023 (and also scheduled in 2031); Oceania in 1992 and 2015, Africa (mainly Southern Africa) in 2003 (and also scheduled in 2027) and the West Indies in 2007.

England have hosted the most World Cups – a total of 5 (including the first three World Cups). England has hosted the most number of World Cup alone, doing it in 1975 and 1979. In 1983 & 2019, despite being regarded as the only host for the tournament, some matches were played in Wales, while in 1999, some matches were played in Ireland, Netherlands, Scotland along with Wales. India are the second nation to host the world cup alone in the 2023 edition. The West Indies hosted the tournament in 2007 but are not considered as sole hosts because the West Indies represents a sporting confederation of 15 mainly English-speaking Caribbean countries, British dependencies and non-British dependencies.

== World Map ==
Host countries of Cricket World Cup

== Summary ==
Tournament	# Matches	Matches Hosted by Nations	Other bidders / Reason Of Single Bidder
1975	15	England (15)	Directly Awarded By ICC
1979	15	England (15)	Directly Awarded By ICC
1983	27	England (26); Wales (1)	India
1987	27	India (17); Pakistan (10)	England
1992	39	Australia (25); New Zealand (14)	India; Pakistan
1996	37	India (17); Pakistan (16); Sri Lanka (4)	England; South Africa
1999	42	England (37); Wales (1) Scotland (2) (Republic of Ireland) Ireland (1); Netherlands (1)	Awarded For Losing 1996 World Cup Hosting
2003	54	South Africa (46); Zimbabwe (6); Kenya (2)	Awarded For Losing 1996 World Cup Hosting And Rotational Policy
2007	51	(Cricket West Indies) West Indies (51)	(The Bahamas) Bahamas; Bermuda; United States
2011	49	India (29); Sri Lanka (12); Bangladesh (8)	Australia; New Zealand; Pakistan; United Arab Emirates
2015	49	Australia (26); New Zealand (23)	Awarded For Losing 2011 World Cup Hosting bid.
2019	48	England (44); Wales (4)	Awarded As Per Rotation Policy
2023	48	India (48)	Awarded As Per Rotation Policy
2027	57	South Africa; Zimbabwe; Namibia	Pakistan, Sri Lanka, Australia, England, United Arab Emirates
2031	–	India; Bangladesh	Pakistan, Sri Lanka

== Hosts Selection ==
=== 1975, 1979 and 1983 Cricket World Cups ===
England hosted the first three competitions. The ICC decided that England should host the first tournament because it was ready to put the resources needed in organising the inaugural event. India proposed that it should host the third Cricket World Cup, but most ICC members believed England was a more suitable venue because longer period of daylight in June. This meant that a match could be completed in one day.

1975, 1979 and 1983^{†} Host: England †In 1983, England are considered as sole hosts. However, one match was played in Swansea, Wales.

=== 1987 Cricket World Cup ===
The first competition hosted outside England was the 1987 Cricket World Cup, which was jointly held in India and Pakistan. A change in location led to a reduction in the number of overs from sixty to fifty in each innings because of the shorter duration of daylight.

1987 Hosts: India and Pakistan

=== 2007 Cricket World Cup ===
The 2007 Cricket World Cup was awarded to the West Indies via the International Cricket Council's rotational policy. It was the first time the Cricket World Cup had been held in the Caribbean despite the fact that the West Indies cricket team had been the second most successful team in past World Cups. Bermuda and the United States unsuccessfully bid for the right to host matches.

2007 Hosts: West Indies

=== 2011, 2015 and 2019 Cricket World Cups ===
2011 Bids:

- Australia and New Zealand
- India, Pakistan, Sri Lanka and Bangladesh

The ICC originally announced its decision which countries would host the 2011 World Cup on 30 April 2006. Australia and New Zealand's bid for the tournament was the only bid for 2011 delivered to ICC headquarters in Dubai ahead of the 1 March deadline.

ICC President Ehsan Mani said the extra time taken by the Asian bloc to hand over its bid compliance book had harmed the four-nation bid. However, when the time came to vote, Asia won the hosting rights by ten votes to three. The Pakistan Cricket Board revealed that it was the vote of the West Indies Cricket Board that swung the matter, as the Asian bid had the support of the four bidding countries along with South Africa and Zimbabwe. It was reported in Pakistani newspaper Dawn that the Asian countries promised to hold fund-raising events for West Indian cricket during the 2007 World Cup, which may have influenced the vote. However, chairman of the Monitoring Committee of the Asian bid, I. S. Bindra, said it was their promise of extra profits in the region of US$400 million that swung the vote, that there "was no quid pro quo for their support", and that playing the West Indies had "nothing to do with the World Cup bid".

After missing out on 2011, Australia and New Zealand were awarded the 2015 World Cup. England was awarded the 2019 event as part of rotational policy.

2011 Voting Result:

1. India, Pakistan, Sri Lanka and Bangladesh, 10 votes
2. Australia and New Zealand, 3 votes

==== 2011 World Cup moved out of Pakistan ====
The World cup was moved out of Pakistan by the ICC on 17 April 2009 due to ongoing concerns about the "uncertain security situation" prevailing in the country, especially in the aftermath of the 2009 attack on the Sri Lanka national cricket team in Lahore. On 9 April 2009, PCB chairman Ijaz Butt revealed that they had issued a legal notice to oppose the ICC's decision. However, the ICC claims that PCB is still a co-host and they have only shifted the matches out of Pakistan. Pakistan had proposed that South Africa host the 2015 World Cup and Australia/New Zealand host 2011, however this option did not find favour with their co-hosts and hence didn't materialise.

2011 Hosts: India, Sri Lanka and Bangladesh

2015 Hosts: Australia and New Zealand awarded after losing the 2011 hosting bid.

=== 2027 and 2031 Cricket World Cups ===
On 16 November 2021, ICC published the name of the hosts for ICC events to be played between 2024 and 2031 cycle. The hosts for the 50-over World Cup including T20 World Cup and Champions Trophy were selected through a competitive bidding process overseen by a sub-committee chaired by Sourav Ganguly, former president of the BCCI, Ricky Skerritt, president of Cricket West Indies and Martin Snedden.

- 2027 Host: South Africa, Zimbabwe and Namibia
- 2031 Host: India and Bangladesh

== Unofficial rotation system ==
Since the 1983 World Cup in England, an unofficial rotation system was introduced so that each cricket playing region of the world would have the opportunity to host the World Cup after every twenty years. However, according to the Sydney Morning Herald, The Age and Cricinfo, owing to the increasing power and role of the Asian nations, particularly India, this convention has not been strictly adhered to. For example, according to the rotation system, Australia and New Zealand should have been hosts for the event in 2011. But, the subcontinent won the bid because it would fetch additional US$ 400 million in profit.
