= Dillagi... Yeh Dillagi =

- Directed by: P. Akash
- Written by: P. Akash
- Produced by: Ajay S. Bharadwaj
- Starring: Dharmendra; Rati Agnihotri; Asrani
- Music by: Suresh Raheja
- Production company: Krishraj Productions
- Country: India
- Language: Hindi

Dillagi ... Yeh Dillagi is an unreleased Indian Hindi-language romantic comedy film directed by P. Akash and produced by Ajay S. Bharadwaj under the banner of Krishraj Productions. Featuring actors Dharmendra, Rati Agnihotri and Asrani in key roles, the film also boasts an item number performed by former Indian cricketer Kapil Dev. The story revolves around two families, one of which is an inter-caste. Suresh Raheja composed the film score, while lyrics were written by Sudhakar Sharma.

== Cast ==
- Dharmendra as Ashok
- Sakshi Shivanand as Madhu
- Rati Agnihotri as Suman
- Asrani as Khairatlal
- Amitabh Dayal as Sunil
- Asha Varijoshi as Ananya
- Kapil Dev as Himself

== Music ==
The soundtrack of the film was given by Suresh Raheja. The title song, written by Sudhakar Sharma, was recorded by Kumar Sanu at Sunny Super Sound Studio.
