= 2022 Papua New Guinea Tri-Nation Series =

The 2022 Papua New Guinea Tri-Nation Series can refer to:

- 2022 Papua New Guinea Tri-Nation Series (round 11), a cricket tri-series in April 2022 between Oman, Papua New Guinea and Scotland
- 2022 Papua New Guinea Tri-Nation Series (round 16), a cricket tri-series in September 2022 between Namibia, Papua New Guinea and the United States
