= Blades of Glory Cricket Museum =

Museum in Pune, India

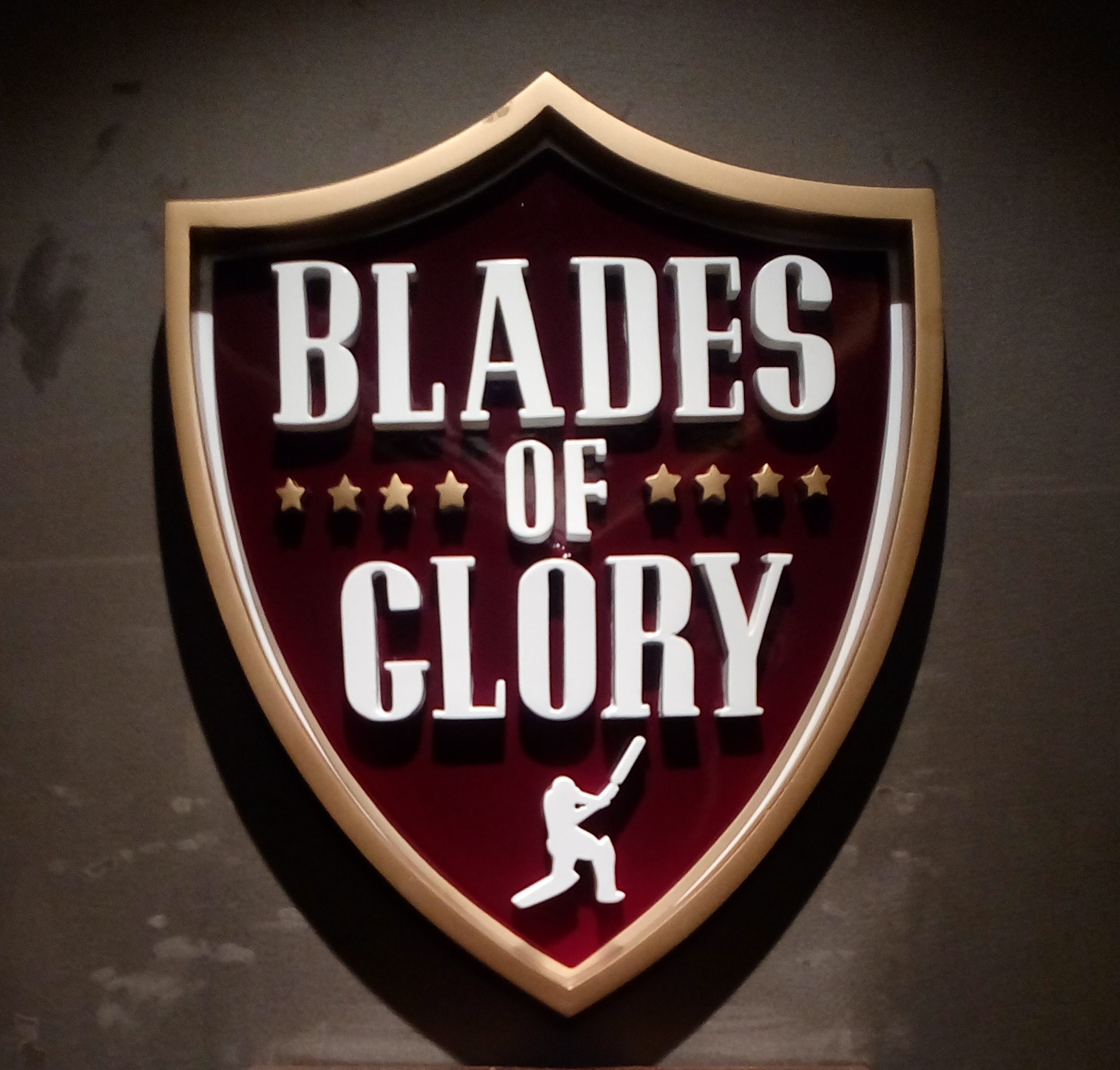
- Logo of the museum
- Established: 2012; 14 years ago
- Location: Pune, Maharashtra, India
- Coordinates: 18°29′9.2328″N 73°50′36.7152″E
- Collection size: 51,000
- Website: bladesofglorymuseum.com

Blades of Glory Cricket Museum is a cricket memorabilia museum located in Pune, Maharashtra, India. It was founded by Rohan Pate, a former Maharashtra cricketer and was inaugurated by Sachin Tendulkar in 2012.

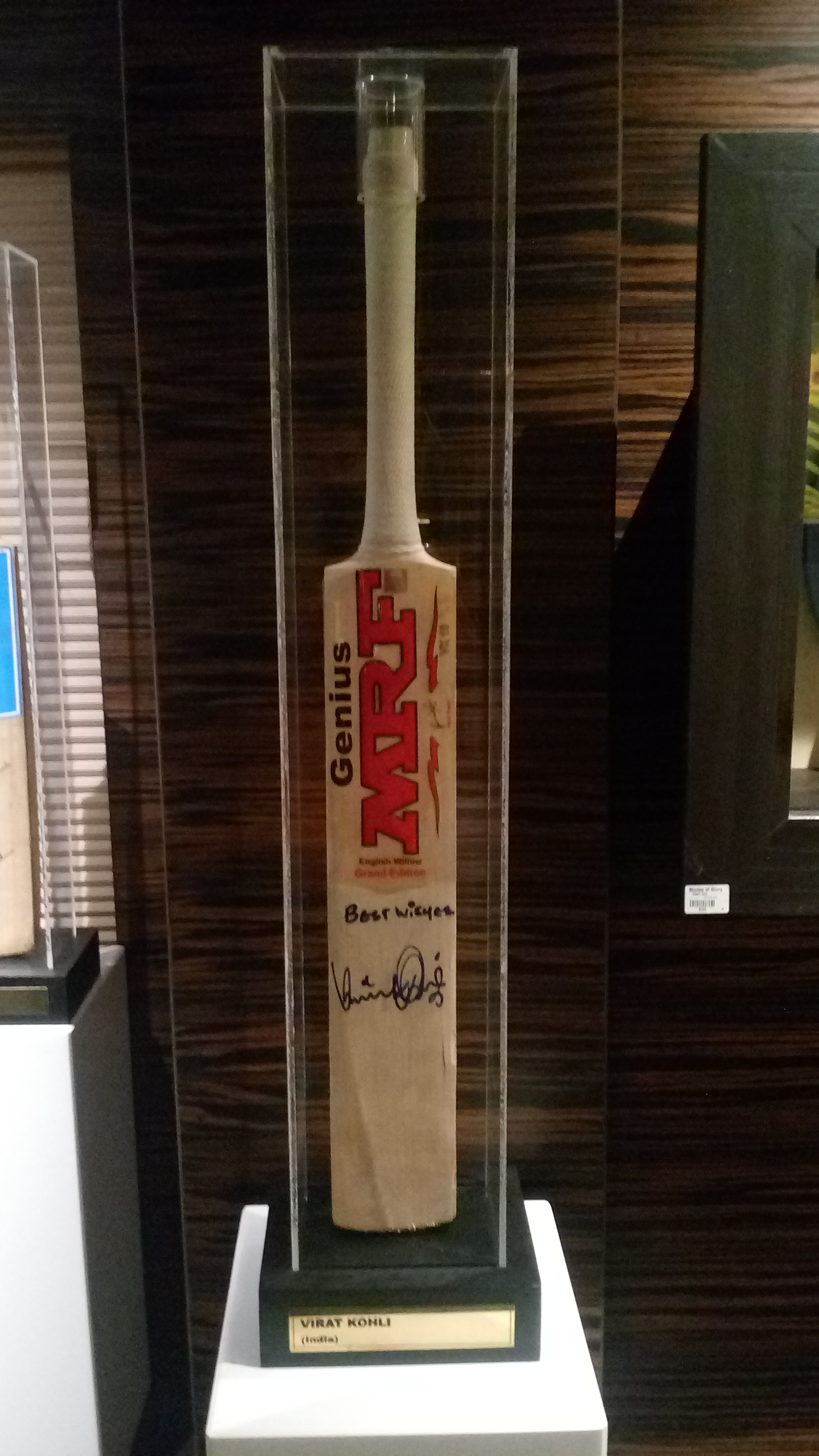
Virat Kohli's signed bat at Blades of Glory Cricket Museum

The museum has a 5,000 ft^{2} (460 m^{2}) gallery with a collection of over 51,000 cricket items including bats signed by the captains of the world cup winning teams, bats signed by members of World Cup winning teams, signed t-shirts from the 2011 Cricket World Cup winning Indian team, and personal items signed and used by famous international cricketers. More than 450 international cricketers have visited the museum.
