= Cricket World Cup =

Men's One Day International (ODI) event

ICC Men's Cricket World Cup
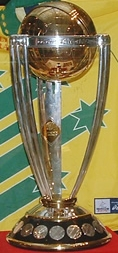
- The Cricket World Cup Trophy
- Administrator: International Cricket Council
- Format: One Day International
- First edition: 1975; England
- Latest edition: 2023; India
- Next edition: 2027; South Africa; Zimbabwe; Namibia
- Tournament format: see below
- Number of teams: 14
- Current champion: Australia (6th title)
- Most successful: Australia (6 titles)
- Most runs: (India) Sachin Tendulkar (2,278)
- Most wickets: (Australia) Glenn McGrath (71)
- Website: cricketworldcup.com

The ICC Men's Cricket World Cup is a quadrennial world cup for cricket in One Day International (ODI) format, organised by the International Cricket Council (ICC). The tournament is one of the world's most viewed sporting events and considered the flagship event of the international cricket calendar by the ICC.

The first Cricket World Cup was organised in England in June 1975, with the first ODI cricket match having been played only four years earlier. However, a separate Women's Cricket World Cup had been held two years before the first men's tournament, and a tournament involving multiple international teams had been held as early as 1912, when a triangular tournament of Test matches was played between Australia, England and South Africa. The first three World Cups were held in England. From the 1987 tournament onwards, hosting has been shared between countries under an unofficial rotation system, with 14 ICC members having hosted at least one match in the tournament.

The current format involves a qualification phase, which takes place over the preceding three years, to determine which teams qualify for the tournament phase. In the tournament phase, 10 teams, including the automatically qualifying host nation, compete for the title at venues within the host nation over about a month. In the 2027 World Cup, the format will be changed to accommodate an expanded 14-team final competition.

A total of twenty teams have competed in the 13 editions of the tournament, with ten teams competing in the recent 2023 tournament. Australia has won the tournament six times, India and West Indies twice each, while Pakistan, Sri Lanka and England have won it once each. The best performance by a non-full-member team came when Kenya made the semi-finals of the 2003 tournament.

Australia are the current champions after winning the 2023 World Cup in India. The subsequent 2027 World Cup will be held jointly in South Africa, Zimbabwe and Namibia.

== History ==
The first international cricket match was played between Canada and the United States, on 24 and 25 September 1844. However, the first credited Test match was played in 1877 between Australia and England, and the two teams competed regularly for The Ashes in subsequent years. South Africa was admitted to Test status in 1889. Representative cricket teams were selected to tour each other, resulting in bilateral competition. Cricket was also included as an Olympic sport at the 1900 Paris Games, where Great Britain defeated France to win the gold medal. This was the only appearance of cricket at the Summer Olympics.

The first multilateral competition at international level was the 1912 Triangular Tournament, a Test cricket tournament played in England between all three Test-playing nations at the time: England, Australia and South Africa. The event was not a success: the summer was exceptionally wet, making play difficult on damp uncovered pitches, and crowd attendances were poor, attributed to a "surfeit of cricket". Since then, international Test cricket has generally been organised as bilateral series: a multilateral Test tournament was not organised again until the triangular Asian Test Championship in 1999.

The number of nations playing Test cricket increased gradually over time, with the addition of West Indies in 1928, New Zealand in 1930, India in 1932, and Pakistan in 1952. However, international cricket continued to be played as bilateral Test matches over three, four or five days.

In the early 1960s, English county cricket teams began playing a shortened version of cricket which only lasted for one day. Starting in 1962 with a four-team knockout competition known as the Midlands Knock-Out Cup, and continuing with the inaugural Gillette Cup in 1963, one-day cricket grew in popularity in England. A national Sunday League was formed in 1969. The first One-Day International match was played on the fifth day of a rain-aborted Test match between England and Australia at Melbourne in 1971, to fill the time available and as compensation for the frustrated crowd. It was a forty over game with eight balls per over, and saw Australia win by 5 wickets. The success and popularity of the domestic one-day competitions in England and other parts of the world, as well as the early One-Day Internationals, prompted the ICC to consider organizing a Cricket World Cup.

=== Prudential World Cups (1975–1983) ===
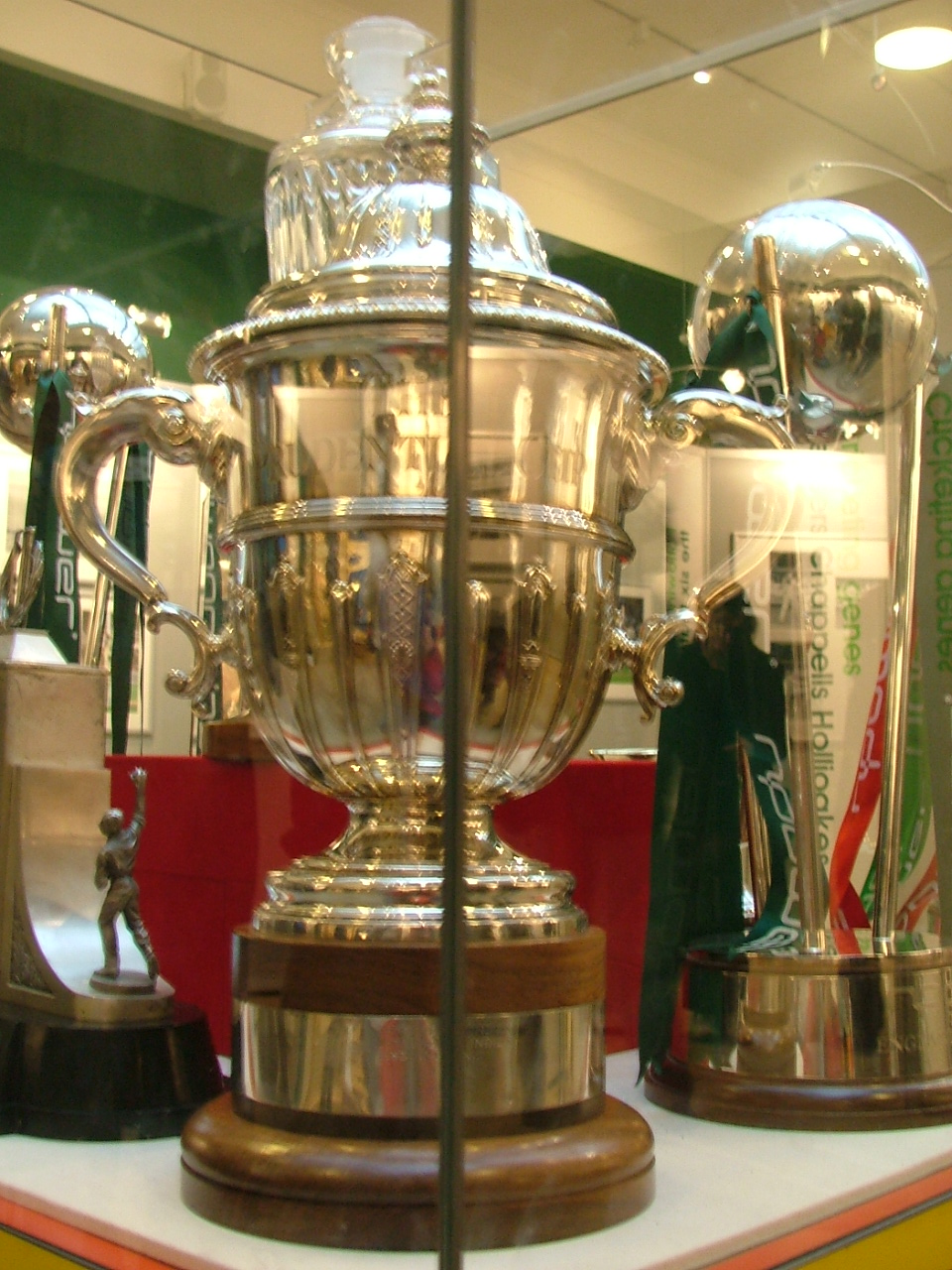
The Prudential Cup trophy

The inaugural Cricket World Cup was hosted in 1975 by England, the only nation able to put forward the resources to stage an event of such magnitude at the time. The first three tournaments were held in England and officially known as the Prudential Cup after the sponsors Prudential plc. The matches consisted of 60 six-ball overs per team, played during daytime in the traditional form, with the players wearing cricket whites and using red cricket balls.

Eight teams participated in the first tournament: Australia, England, India, New Zealand, Pakistan, and the West Indies (the six Test nations at the time), together with Sri Lanka and a composite team from East Africa. One notable omission was South Africa, who were banned from international cricket due to apartheid. The tournament was won by the West Indies, who defeated Australia by 17 runs in the final at Lord's. Roy Fredricks of West Indies was the first batsmen who got hit-wicket in ODI during the 1975 World Cup final.

The 1979 World Cup saw the introduction of the ICC Trophy competition to select non-Test playing teams for the World Cup, with Sri Lanka and Canada qualifying. The West Indies won a second consecutive World Cup tournament, defeating the hosts England by 92 runs in the final. At a meeting which followed the World Cup, the International Cricket Conference agreed to make the competition a quadrennial event.

The 1983 event was hosted by England for a third consecutive time. By this stage, Sri Lanka had become a Test-playing nation, and Zimbabwe qualified through the ICC Trophy. A fielding circle was introduced, 30 yards (27 m) away from the stumps. Four fieldsmen needed to be inside it at all times. The teams faced each other twice, before moving into the knock-outs. India was crowned champions after upsetting the West Indies by 43 runs in the final.

=== Various champions (1987–1996) ===
India and Pakistan jointly hosted the 1987 tournament, the first time that the competition was held outside England. The games were reduced from 60 to 50 overs per innings, the current standard, because of the shorter daylight hours in the Indian subcontinent compared with England's summer. Australia won the championship by defeating England by 7 runs in the final, the closest margin in the World Cup final until the 2019 edition between England and New Zealand. The 1992 World Cup, held in Australia and New Zealand, introduced many changes to the game, such as coloured clothing, white balls, day/night matches, and a change to the fielding restriction rules. The South African cricket team participated in the event for the first time, following the fall of the apartheid regime and the end of the international sports boycott. Pakistan overcame a dismal start in the tournament to eventually defeat England by 22 runs in the final and emerge as winners.

The 1996 championship was held in the Indian subcontinent for a second time, with the inclusion of Sri Lanka as host for some of its group stage matches. In the semi-final, Sri Lanka, heading towards a crushing victory over India at Eden Gardens after the hosts lost eight wickets while scoring 120 runs in pursuit of 252, were awarded victory by default after crowd unrest broke out in protest against the Indian performance. Sri Lanka went on to win their maiden championship by defeating Australia by seven wickets in the final at Lahore.

=== Australian treble (1999–2007) ===
In 1999, the event was hosted by England, with some matches also being held in Scotland, Ireland, Wales and the Netherlands. Twelve teams contested the World Cup. Australia qualified for the semi-finals after reaching their target in their Super 6 match against South Africa off the final over of the match. They then proceeded to the final with a tied match in the semi-final also against South Africa where a mix-up between South African batsmen Lance Klusener and Allan Donald saw Donald drop his bat and stranded mid-pitch to be run out. In the final, Australia dismissed Pakistan for 132 and then reached the target in less than 20 overs and with eight wickets in hand.

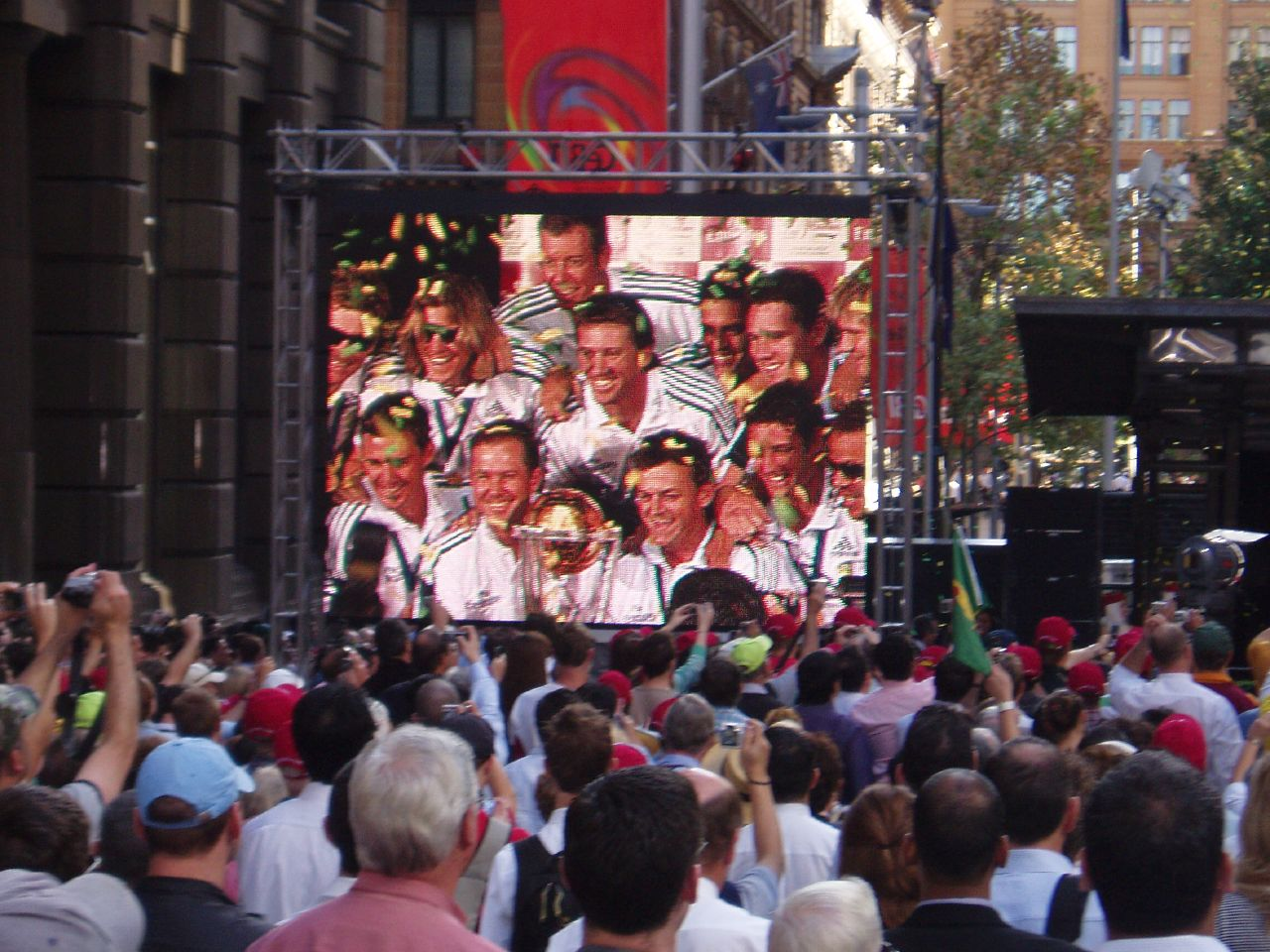
A crowd of over 10,000 fans welcome the Australian team on completing the first World Cup hat-trick – Martin Place, Sydney.

South Africa, Zimbabwe and Kenya hosted the 2003 World Cup. The number of teams participating in the event increased from twelve to fourteen. Kenya's victories over Sri Lanka and Zimbabwe, among others – and a forfeit by the New Zealand team, which refused to play in Kenya because of security concerns – enabled Kenya to reach the semi-finals, the best result by an associate. In the final, Australia made 359 runs for the loss of two wickets, the largest ever total in a final, defeating India by 125 runs.

In 2007, the tournament was hosted by the West Indies and expanded to sixteen teams. Following Pakistan's upset loss to World Cup debutants Ireland in the group stage, Pakistani coach Bob Woolmer was found dead in his hotel room. Jamaican police had initially launched a murder investigation into Woolmer's death but later confirmed that he died of heart failure. Australia defeated Sri Lanka in the final by 53 runs (D/L) in farcical light conditions, and extended their undefeated run in the World Cup to 29 matches and winning three straight championships.

=== Hosts triumph (2011–2019) ===
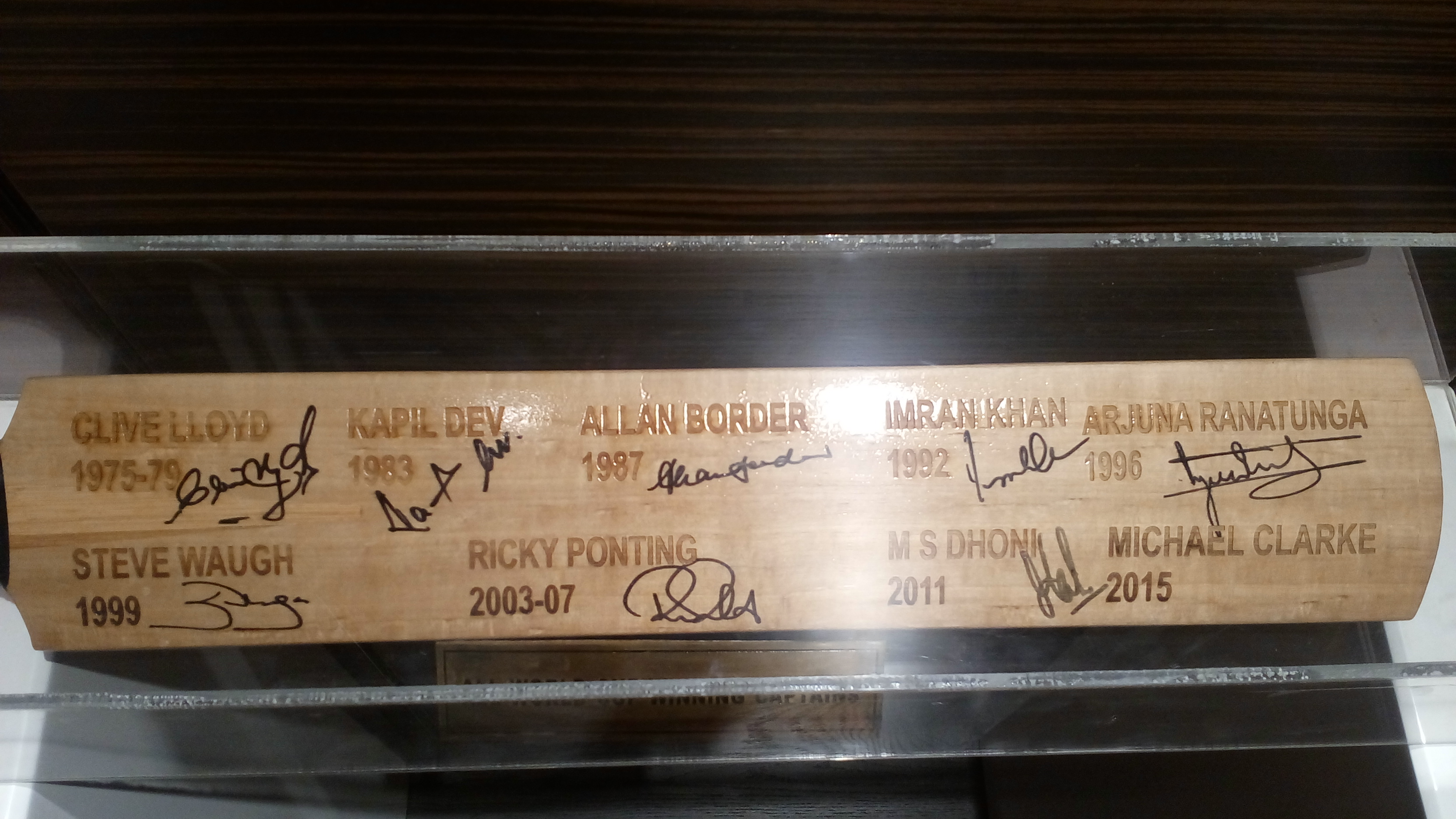
Autographed bat of the World Cup winning captains till 2015 at the Blades of Glory Museum, Pune, India

India, Sri Lanka and Bangladesh together hosted the 2011 World Cup. Pakistan was stripped of its hosting rights following the terrorist attack on the Sri Lankan cricket team in 2009, with the games originally scheduled for Pakistan redistributed to the other host countries. The number of teams participating in the World Cup was reduced to fourteen. Australia lost their final group stage match against Pakistan on 19 March 2011, ending an unbeaten streak of 35 World Cup matches, which had begun on 23 May 1999. India won their second World Cup title by beating Sri Lanka by 6 wickets in the final at Wankhede Stadium in Mumbai, where the Indian captain M.S. Dhoni along with the spinning all-rounder Yuvraj Singh chased 275 with notable performances from Gautam Gambhir and Virat Kohli, making India the first country to win the World Cup at home. This was also the first time that two Asian countries faced each other in a World Cup Final.

Australia and New Zealand jointly hosted the 2015 World Cup. The number of participants remained at fourteen. Ireland was the most successful Associate nation with a total of three wins in the tournament. New Zealand beat South Africa in a thrilling first semi-final to qualify for their maiden World Cup final. Australia defeated New Zealand by seven wickets in the final at Melbourne to lift the World Cup for the fifth time.

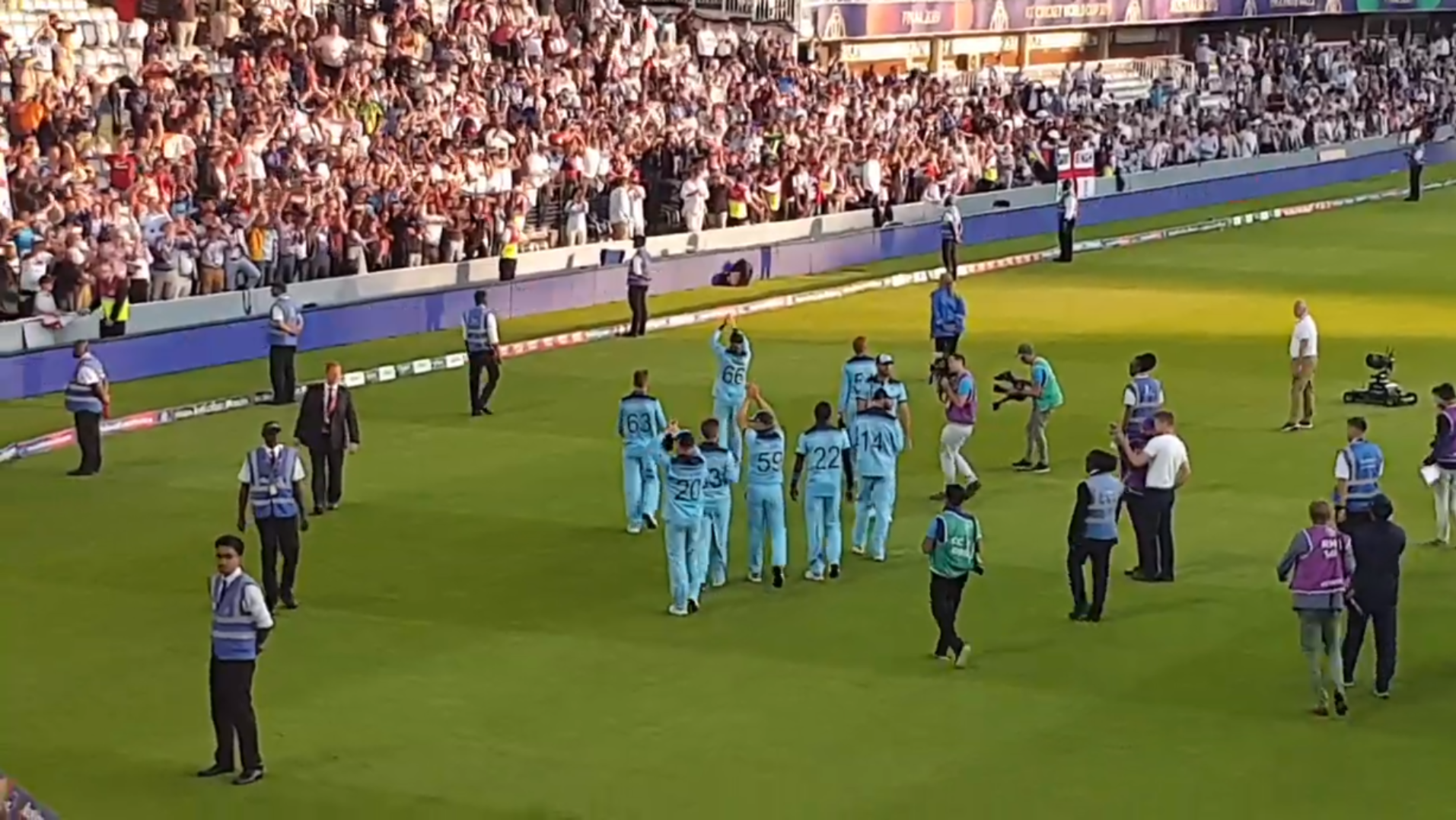
England perform a lap of honour around Lord's after their victory on 14 July 2019.

The 2019 World Cup was hosted by England and Wales. The number of participants was reduced to 10. New Zealand defeated India in the first semi-final, which was pushed over to the reserve day due to rain. England defeated the defending champions, Australia, in the second semi-final. Neither finalist had previously won the World Cup. In the final, the scores were tied at 241 after 50 overs and the match went to a super over, after which the scores were again tied at 15. The World Cup was won by England, whose boundary count was greater than New Zealand's.

=== Australian win (2023) ===
The 2023 Cricket World Cup was hosted by India. The number of teams in the tournament remained at 10, including the Netherlands, which returned to the tournament after a 12-year absence and excluding the inaugural and two-time champions the West Indies; they failed to qualify for the World Cup for the first time in history. India were unbeaten in the group stage, as they won all of their matches and defeated New Zealand to advance to the final; Australia lost twice during the group stage before rebounding and going on an eight-game winning streak, including a defeat of South Africa in the semi-finals. Afghanistan had their most successful World Cup, with four wins during the group stage, including over defending champions England and former champions Pakistan; they also came close to defeating Australia before Glenn Maxwell's double century steered the Aussies to victory. In the final, Australia defeated the 10-match unbeaten India to clinch their record-extending 6th World Cup.

The 2027 World Cup is coming up. It will be hosted in South Africa, Zimbabwe, and Namibia. Namibia will still have to go through the qualification process.

== Format ==
=== Qualification ===
From the first World Cup in 1975 up to the 2019 World Cup, the majority of teams taking part qualified automatically. Until the 2015 World Cup this was mostly through having Full Membership of the ICC, and for the 2019 World Cup this was mostly through ranking position in the ICC ODI Championship.

Since the second World Cup in 1979 up to the 2019 World Cup, the teams that qualified automatically were joined by a small number of others who qualified for the World Cup through the qualification process. The first qualifying tournament being the ICC Trophy; later the process expanding with pre-qualifying tournaments. For the 2011 World Cup, the ICC World Cricket League replaced the past pre-qualifying processes; and the name "ICC Trophy" was changed to "ICC Men's Cricket World Cup Qualifier". The World Cricket League was the qualification system provided to allow the Associate and Affiliate members of the ICC more opportunities to qualify. The number of teams qualifying varied throughout the years.

From the 2023 World Cup onwards, only the host nation(s) will qualify automatically. All countries will participate in a series of leagues to determine qualification, with automatic promotion and relegation between divisions from one World Cup cycle to the next.

=== Tournament ===
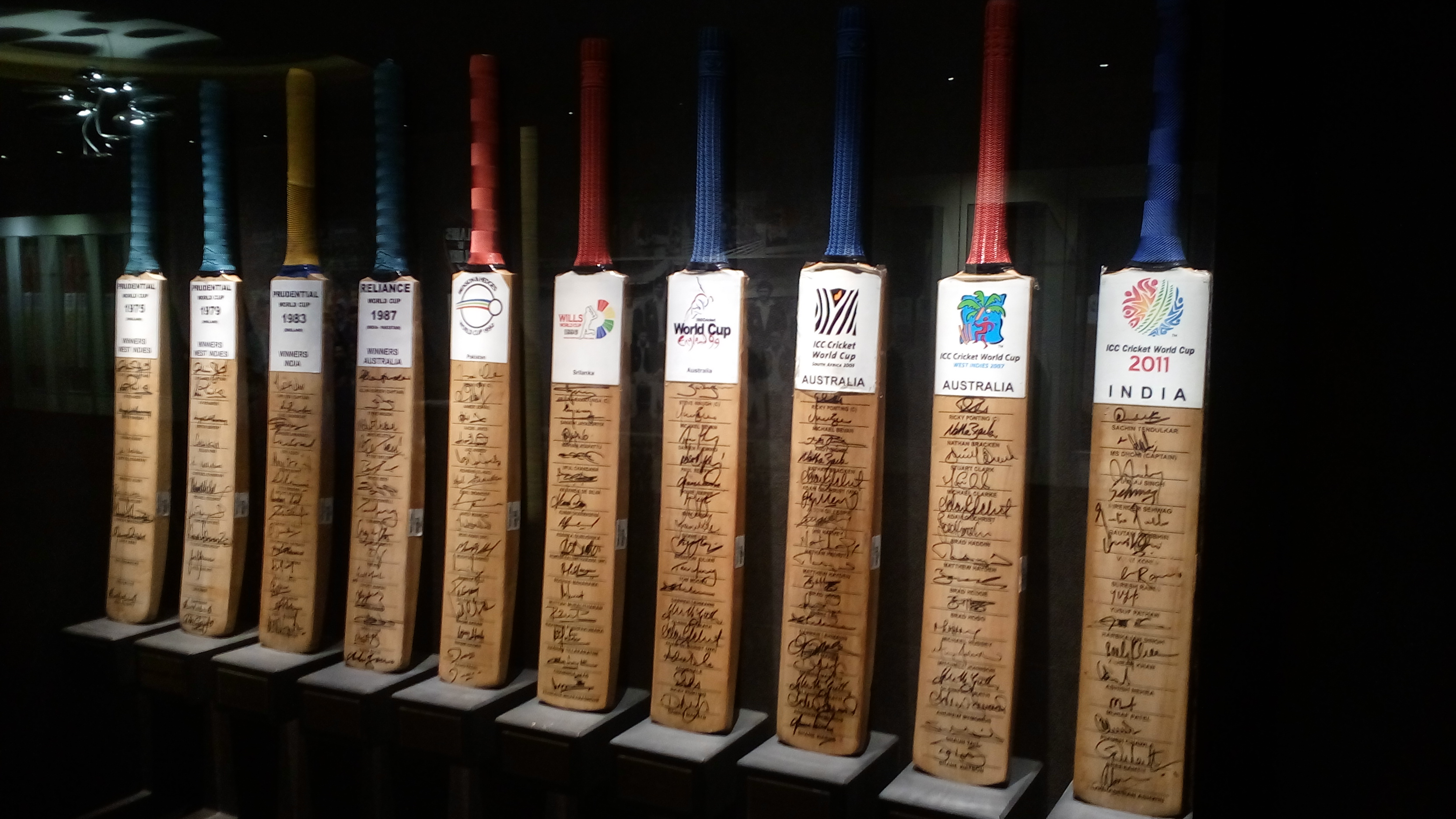
Autographs of the winning teams of each edition of the tournament at the Blades of Glory Cricket Museum, Pune, India.

The format of the Cricket World Cup has changed greatly over the course of its history. Each of the first four tournaments was played by eight teams, divided into two groups of four. The competition consisted of two stages, a group stage and a knock-out stage. The four teams in each group played each other in the round-robin group stage, with the top two teams in each group progressing to the semi-finals. The winners of the semi-finals played against each other in the final. With South Africa returning in the fifth tournament in 1992 as a result of the end of the apartheid boycott, nine teams played each other once in the group phase, and the top four teams progressed to the semi-finals. The tournament was further expanded in 1996, with two groups of six teams. The top four teams from each group progressed to quarter-finals and semi-finals.

A distinct format was used for the 1999 and 2003 World Cups. The teams were split into two pools, with the top three teams in each pool advancing to the Super 6. The Super 6 teams played the three other teams that advanced from the other group. As they advanced, the teams carried their points forward from previous matches against other teams advancing alongside them, giving them an incentive to perform well in the group stages. The top four teams from the Super 6 stage progressed to the semi-finals, with the winners playing in the final.

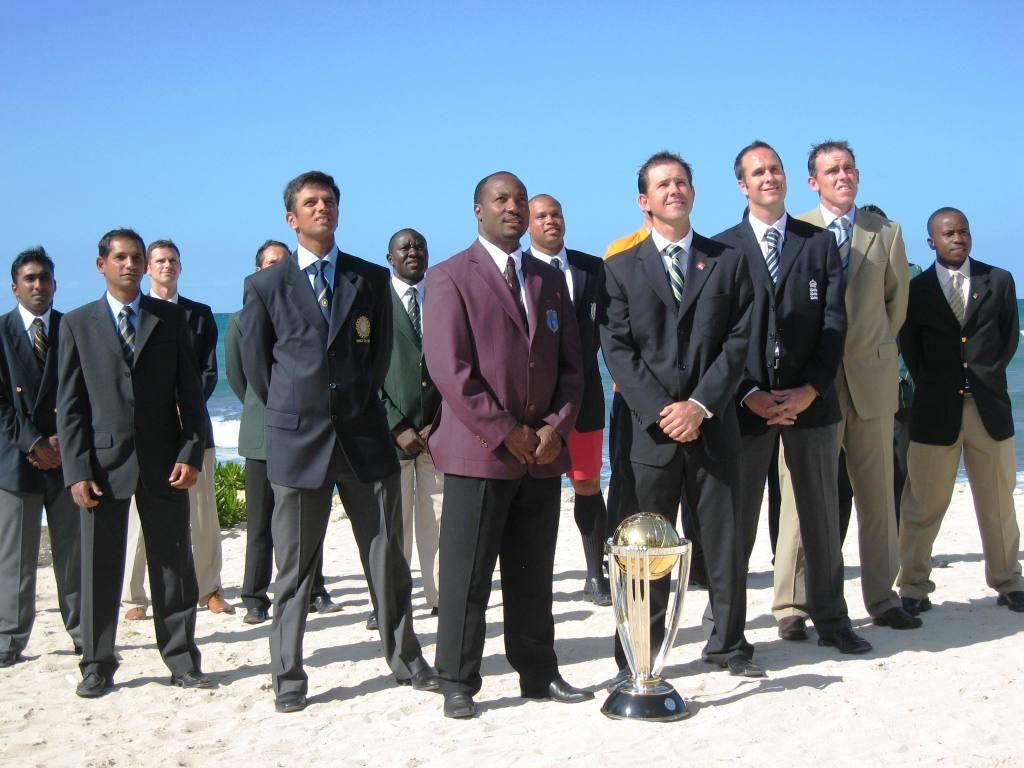
The captains of the 2007 Cricket World Cup.

The format used in the 2007 World Cup involved 16 teams allocated into four groups of four. Within each group, the teams played each other in a round-robin format. Teams earned points for wins and half-points for ties. The top two teams from each group moved forward to the Super 8 round. The Super 8 teams played the other six teams that progressed from the different groups. Teams earned points in the same way as the group stage, but carried their points forward from previous matches against the other teams who qualified from the same group to the Super 8 stage. The top four teams from the Super 8 round advanced to the semi-finals, and the winners of the semi-finals played in the final.

The format used in the 2011 and 2015 World Cups featured two groups of seven teams in the group stage, with the top four teams from each group advancing to the quarter-finals, semi-finals and ultimately the final.

In the 2019 and 2023 editions of the tournament, the field was reduced to 10 teams in a single round robin pool, with the top four teams advancing to the semi-finals.

The 2027 and 2031 World Cups will expand to 14 teams; for 2027, the first round-robin stage will use two groups of six teams each, with the three lowest-seeded qualifiers in the 14-team field playing a three-match Super Series round to determine the twelfth and final team. The top three teams from each group, as well as the best-performing fourth-place team from either group, will advance to the Super 7 round. The top four teams in the Super 7 round will advance to the knockout round. The ICC stated that the changes were intended to improve the competitiveness of the tournament, while also reducing its length.

Summary of tournament formats
Ed.	Year	Host(s)	Teams	Matches	Preliminary stage	Secondary stage	Final stage
1	1975	England	8	15	2 groups of 4 teams: 12 matches	None	Knock-out of 4 teams (group winners and runners-up): 3 matches
2	1979	England	8	15	2 groups of 4 teams: 12 matches	None	Knock-out of 4 teams (group winners and runners-up): 3 matches
3	1983	England; Wales	8	27	2 groups of 4 teams: 24 matches	None	Knock-out of 4 teams (group winners and runners-up): 3 matches
4	1987	India; Pakistan	8	27	2 groups of 4 teams: 24 matches	None	Knock-out of 4 teams (group winners and runners-up): 3 matches
5	1992	Australia; New Zealand	9	39	League stage of 9 teams: 36 matches	None	Knock-out of 4 teams (top 4 in league stage): 3 matches
6	1996	India; Pakistan; Sri Lanka	12	37	2 groups of 6 teams: 30 matches	None	Knock-out of 8 teams (top 4 in each group): 7 matches
7	1999	England; Wales; Scotland; Ireland; Netherlands	12	42	2 groups of 6 teams: 30 matches	Super Six (top 3 from each group): 9 matches	Knock-out of 4 teams (top 4 in Super Six): 3 matches
8	2003	South Africa; Zimbabwe; Kenya	14	54	2 groups of 7 teams: 42 matches	Super Six (top 3 from each group): 9 matches	Knock-out of 4 teams (top 4 in Super Six): 3 matches
9	2007	West Indies	16	51	4 groups of 4 teams: 24 matches	Super Eight (top 2 from each group): 24 matches	Knock-out of 4 teams (top 4 in Super Eight): 3 matches
10	2011	India; Sri Lanka; Bangladesh	14	49	2 groups of 7 teams: 42 matches	None	Knock-out of 8 teams (top 4 in each group): 7 matches
11	2015	Australia; New Zealand	14	49	2 groups of 7 teams: 42 matches	None	Knock-out of 8 teams (top 4 in each group): 7 matches
12	2019	England; Wales	10	48	League stage of 10 teams: 45 matches	None	Knock-out of 4 teams (top 4 in league stage): 3 matches
13	2023	India	10	48	League stage of 10 teams: 45 matches	None	Knock-out of 4 teams (top 4 in league stage): 3 matches
14	2027	South Africa; Zimbabwe; Namibia	14	57	Super Series (single group of 3 teams): 3 matches Group Stage (2 groups of 6 teams): 30 matches	Super Seven (top 3 from each group + best placed fourth team): 21 matches	Knock-out of 4 teams (top 4 in Super Seven): 3 matches
15	2031	India; Bangladesh	14				

== Trophy ==
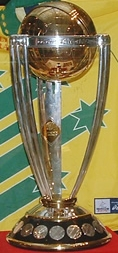
The Cricket World Cup Trophy.

The ICC Cricket World Cup Trophy is presented to the winners of the World Cup. The current trophy was created for the 1999 championships, and was the first permanent prize in the tournament's history. Prior to this, different trophies were made for each World Cup. Before introducing the permanent ICC Cricket World Cup Trophy in 1999, individual trophies were designed and awarded for each edition of the tournament. For example, the Prudential Cup trophies were used for the first three editions (1975, 1979, and 1983) when Prudential plc was the sponsor. Similarly, subsequent tournaments used different designs until the permanent trophy was introduced. This shift to a permanent design was intended to establish a consistent and iconic representation of the World Cup's legacy. The trophy was designed and produced in London by a team of craftsmen from Garrard & Co over a period of two months.

The current trophy is made from silver and gilt, and features a golden globe held up by three silver columns. The columns, shaped as stumps and bails, represent the three fundamental aspects of cricket: batting, bowling and fielding, while the globe characterises a cricket ball. The seam is tilted to symbolize the axial tilt of the Earth. It stands 60 centimetres (24 in) high and weighs approximately 11 kilograms (24 lb). The names of the previous winners are engraved on the base of the trophy, with space for a total of twenty inscriptions. The ICC keeps the original trophy. A replica differing only in the inscriptions is permanently awarded to the winning team.

== Media coverage ==
The tournament is one of the world's most-viewed sporting events, and successive tournaments have generated increasing media attention as One-Day International cricket has become more established. The 2011 Cricket World Cup was televised in over 200 countries to over 2.2 billion viewers. Television rights, mainly for the 2011 and 2015 World Cup, were sold for over US$1.1 billion, and sponsorship rights were sold for a further US$500 million. The ICC claimed a total of 1.6 billion viewers for the 2019 World Cup as well as 4.6 billion views of digital video of the tournament. The most-watched match of the tournament was the group game between India and Pakistan, which was watched by more than 300 million people live.

== Attendance ==
Year	Hosts	Total attendance	References
2003	South Africa, Zimbabwe, Kenya	626,845	
2007	West Indies	672,000	
2011	India, Sri Lanka, Bangladesh	1,229,826	
2015	Australia, New Zealand	1,106,520	
2019	England & Wales	752,000	
2023	India	1,250,307	

== Selection of hosts ==
The International Cricket Council's executive committee votes for the hosts of the tournament after examining the bids made by the nations keen to hold a Cricket World Cup.

Host countries of Cricket World Cup

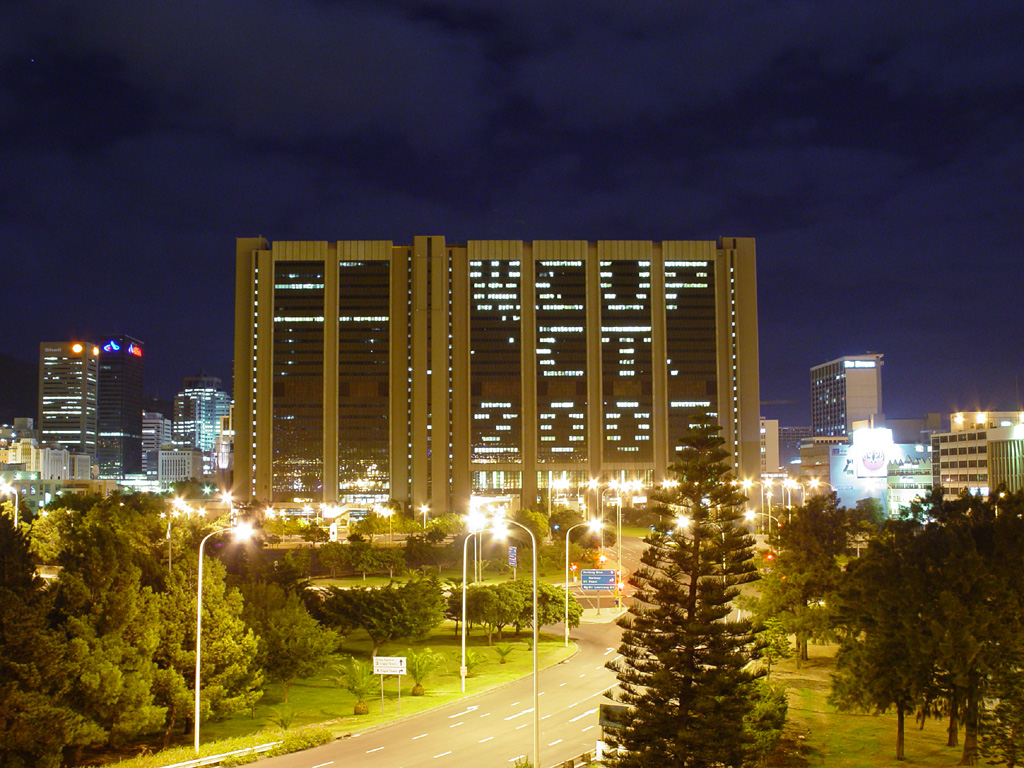
A civic centre lit up to mark the 2003 Cricket World Cup in South Africa

England hosted the first three competitions. The ICC decided that England should host the first tournament because it was ready to devote the resources required to organising the inaugural event. India volunteered to host the third Cricket World Cup, but most ICC members preferred England as the longer period of daylight in England in June meant that a match could be completed in one day. The 1987 Cricket World Cup was held in India and Pakistan, the first hosted outside England.

Many of the tournaments have been jointly hosted by nations from the same geographical region, such as South Asia in 1987, 1996 and 2011, Australasia (in Australia and New Zealand) in 1992 and 2015, Southern Africa in 2003 and West Indies in 2007.

In November 2021, ICC published the name of the hosts for ICC events to be played between 2024 and 2031 cycle. The hosts for the 50-over World Cup along with T20 World Cup and Champions Trophy were selected through a competitive bidding process.

== Results ==
Ed.	Year	Hosts	Final Venue	Final			No. of teams
Ed.	Year	Hosts	Final Venue	Champions	Result	Runners-up	No. of teams
1	1975	England	Lord's, London	West Indies; 291/8 (60 overs)	West Indies won by 17 runs (scorecard)	Australia; 274 all out (58.4 overs)	8
2	1979	England	Lord's, London	West Indies; 286/9 (60 overs)	West Indies won by 92 runs (scorecard)	England; 194 all out (51 overs)	8
3	1983	England; Wales	Lord's, London	India; 183 all out (54.4 overs)	India won by 43 runs (scorecard)	West Indies; 140 all out (52 overs)	8
4	1987	India; Pakistan	Eden Gardens, Kolkata	Australia; 253/5 (50 overs)	Australia won by 7 runs (scorecard)	England; 246/8 (50 overs)	8
5	1992	Australia; New Zealand	Melbourne Cricket Ground, Melbourne	Pakistan; 249/6 (50 overs)	Pakistan won by 22 runs (scorecard)	England; 227 all out (49.2 overs)	9
6	1996	India; Pakistan; Sri Lanka	Gaddafi Stadium, Lahore	Sri Lanka; 245/3 (46.2 overs)	Sri Lanka won by 7 wickets (scorecard)	Australia; 241/7 (50 overs)	12
7	1999	England (Note: England was the sole designated host, but matches were also played in Wales, Scotland, the Republic of Ireland, and the Netherlands.); Wales; Scotland; Ireland; Netherlands	Lord's, London	Australia; 133/2 (20.1 overs)	Australia won by 8 wickets (scorecard)	Pakistan; 132 all out (39 overs)	12
8	2003	South Africa (Note: South Africa was the sole designated main host, but matches were also played in Zimbabwe and Kenya.); Zimbabwe; Kenya	Wanderers Stadium, Johannesburg	Australia; 359/2 (50 overs)	Australia won by 125 runs (scorecard)	India; 234 all out (39.2 overs)	14
9	2007	West Indies (Note: Eight member countries of the West Indies Cricket Federation hosted matches – Antigua and Barbuda, Barbados, Grenada, Guyana, Jamaica, Saint Kitts and Nevis, Saint Lucia, and Trinidad and Tobago.)	Kensington Oval, Bridgetown	Australia; 281/4 (38 overs)	Australia won by 53 runs (D/L) (scorecard)	Sri Lanka; 215/8 (36 overs)	16
10	2011	India; Sri Lanka; Bangladesh	Wankhede Stadium, Mumbai	India; 277/4 (48.2 overs)	India won by 6 wickets (scorecard)	Sri Lanka; 274/6 (50 overs)	14
11	2015	Australia; New Zealand	Melbourne Cricket Ground, Melbourne	Australia; 186/3 (33.1 overs)	Australia won by 7 wickets (scorecard)	New Zealand; 183 all out (45 overs)	14
12	2019	England; Wales	Lord's, London	England; 241 all out (50 overs); 15/0 (super over); 24 fours, 2 sixes	Match tied (England won on boundaries countback) (scorecard)	New Zealand; 241/8 (50 overs); 15/1 (super over); 14 fours, 3 sixes	10
13	2023	India	Narendra Modi Stadium, Ahmedabad	Australia; 241/4 (43 overs)	Australia won by 6 wickets (scorecard)	India; 240 all out (50 overs)	10
14	2027	South Africa; Zimbabwe; Namibia	Wanderers Stadium, Johannesburg				14
15	2031	India; Bangladesh	TBA				14

Notes

Map showing countries' best results in Cricket World Cup (1975 – 2023).

Map of countries' best results.

=== Titles summary ===
Team	Titles	Runners-up
Australia	6 (1987, 1999, 2003, 2007, 2015, 2023)	2 (1975, 1996)
India	2 (1983, 2011)	2 (2003, 2023)
West Indies	2 (1975, 1979)	1 (1983)
England	1 (2019)	3 (1979, 1987, 1992)
Sri Lanka	1 (1996)	2 (2007, 2011)
Pakistan	1 (1992)	1 (1999)
New Zealand	—N/a	2 (2015, 2019)

== Tournament summary ==
Twenty nations have qualified for the Cricket World Cup at least once. Six teams have competed in every tournament, five of which have won the title. The West Indies won the first two tournaments, Australia has won six, India has won two, while Pakistan, Sri Lanka and England have each won once. The West Indies (1975 and 1979) and Australia (1999, 2003 and 2007) are the only teams to have won consecutive titles. Australia has played in eight of the thirteen finals (1975, 1987, 1996, 1999, 2003, 2007, 2015 and 2023). New Zealand has yet to win the World Cup, but has been runners-up two times (2015 and 2019). The best result by a non-Test playing nation is the semi-final appearance by Kenya in the 2003 tournament; while the best result by a non-Test playing team on their debut is the Super 8 (second round) by Ireland in 2007.

Sri Lanka, as a co-host of the 1996 World Cup, was the first host to win the tournament, though the final was held in Pakistan. India won in 2011 as host and was the first team to win a final played in their own country. Australia and England repeated the feat in 2015 and 2019 respectively. Other than this, England in 1979 and India in 2023 made it to the final which was hosted by their country. Other countries which have achieved or equalled their best World Cup results while co-hosting the tournament are Sri Lanka and New Zealand as finalists in 2011 and 2015 respectively, Zimbabwe who reached the Super Six in 2003, and Kenya as semi-finalists in 2003. In 1987, co-hosts India and Pakistan both reached the semi-finals, but were eliminated by England and Australia respectively. Australia in 1992, England in 1999, South Africa in 2003, and Bangladesh in 2011 have been host teams that were eliminated in the first round.

=== Teams' performances ===
An overview of the teams' performances in every World Cup is given below. For each tournament, the number of teams in each finals tournament (in brackets) are shown.

No. of teams/ Seasons Host(s) Team	(8) 1975	(8) 1979	(8) 1983	(8) 1987	(9) 1992	(12) 1996	(12) 1999	(14) 2003	(16) 2007	(14) 2011	(14) 2015	(10) 2019	(10) 2023	(14) 2027	Apps.
No. of teams/ Seasons Host(s) Team	(England)	(England)	(England) (Wales)	(India) (Pakistan)	(Australia) (New Zealand)	(India) (Pakistan) (Sri Lanka)	(England) (Wales) (Scotland) (Republic of Ireland) (Netherlands)	(South Africa) (Zimbabwe) (Kenya)	(Cricket West Indies)	(India) (Sri Lanka) (Bangladesh)	(Australia) (New Zealand)	(England) (Wales)	(India)	(South Africa) (Namibia) (Zimbabwe)	Apps.
Afghanistan											GP	10th	6th	Q	3
Australia	RU	GP	GP	W	5th	RU	W	W	W	QF	W	SF	W	Q	13
Bangladesh							GP	GP	7th	GP	QF	8th	8th	Q	7
Bermuda									GP						1
Canada		GP						GP	GP	GP				TBD	4
England	SF	RU	SF	RU	RU	QF	GP	GP	5th	QF	GP	W	7th	Q	13
India	GP	GP	W	SF	7th	SF	6th	RU	GP	W	SF	SF	RU	Q	13
Ireland									8th	GP	GP			TBD	3
Kenya						GP	GP	SF	GP	GP				TBD	5
Namibia								GP						TBD	1
Netherlands						GP		GP	GP	GP			10th	TBD	5
New Zealand	SF	SF	GP	GP	SF	QF	SF	5th	SF	SF	RU	RU	SF	Q	13
Pakistan	GP	SF	SF	SF	W	QF	RU	GP	GP	SF	QF	5th	5th	Q	13
Scotland							GP		GP		GP			TBD	3
South Africa (Note: Before the 1992 World Cup, South Africa were banned due to apartheid)					SF	QF	SF	GP	SF	QF	SF	7th	SF	Q	9
Sri Lanka	GP	GP	GP	GP	8th	W	GP	SF	RU	RU	QF	6th	9th	Q	13
United Arab Emirates						GP					GP			TBD	2
West Indies	W	W	RU	GP	6th	SF	GP	GP	6th	QF	QF	9th		TBD	12
Zimbabwe			GP	GP	9th	GP	5th	6th	GP	GP	GP			Q	9
Defunct teams
East Africa (Note: Disbanded in 1989)	GP				—N/a										1

Legend

- W – Winner
- RU– Runner up
- SF– Semi-finals
- S6– Super Six (1999–2003)
- QF– Quarter-finals (1996, 2011–2015)
- S8– Super Eight (2007)
- GP – Group stage / First round
- Q – Qualified, Still in Competition
- — Hosts

=== Debutant teams ===
Year	Teams	Total
1975	Australia, East Africa, England, India, New Zealand, Pakistan, West Indies, Sri Lanka	8
1979	Canada	1
1983	Zimbabwe	1
1987	none	0
1992	South Africa	1
1996	Kenya, Netherlands, United Arab Emirates	3
1999	Bangladesh, Scotland	2
2003	Namibia	1
2007	Bermuda, Ireland	2
2011	none	0
2015	Afghanistan	1
2019	none	0
2023	none	0

=== Overview ===
The table below provides an overview of the performances of teams over past World Cups, as of the end of the 2023 tournament. Teams are ordered by best result then by appearances, then by winning percentage, then by total number of wins, total number of number of games, and then alphabetically:

Team	Statistics							Best performance
Team	Apps	Mat.	Won	Lost	Tie	NR	Win%*	Best performance
Australia	13	105	78	25	1	1	75.48	Champions (1987, 1999, 2003, 2007, 2015, 2023)
India	13	95	63	30	1	1	67.55	Champions (1983, 2011)
West Indies	12	80	43	35	0	2	55.12	Champions (1975, 1979)
England	13	93	52	39	1	1	57.14	Champions (2019)
Pakistan	13	88	49	37	0	2	56.97	Champions (1992)
Sri Lanka	13	89	40	46	1	2	46.55	Champions (1996)
New Zealand	13	99	59	38	1	1	60.71	Runners-up (2015, 2019)
South Africa	9	74	45	26	2	1	63.01	Semi-finals (1992, 1999, 2007, 2015, 2023)
Kenya	5	29	6	22	0	0	21.42	Semi-finals (2003)
Zimbabwe	9	57	11	42	1	3	21.29	Super 6s (1999, 2003)
Bangladesh	7	49	16	32	0	1	33.33	Super 8s (2007) & Quarter-finals (2015)
Ireland	3	21	7	13	1	0	35.71	Super 8s (2007)
Netherlands	5	29	4	25	0	0	13.79	Group stage (1996, 2003, 2007, 2011, 2023)
Canada	4	18	2	16	0	0	11.11	Group stage (1979, 2003, 2007, 2011)
Afghanistan	3	24	5	19	0	0	20.83	Group stage (2015, 2019, 2023)
Scotland	3	14	0	14	0	0	0.00	Group stage (1999, 2007, 2015)
United Arab Emirates	2	11	1	10	0	0	9.09	Group stage (1996, 2015)
Namibia	1	6	0	6	0	0	0.00	Group stage (2003)
Bermuda	1	3	0	3	0	0	0.00	Group stage (2007)
Defunct teams
East Africa	1	3	0	3	0	0	0.00	Group stage (1975)
As of 19 November 2023 Source: ESPNcricinfo

Note:

- The Win percentage excludes no results and counts ties as half a win.
- Teams are sorted by their best performance, then winning percentage, then (if equal) by alphabetical order.

== Tournament records ==
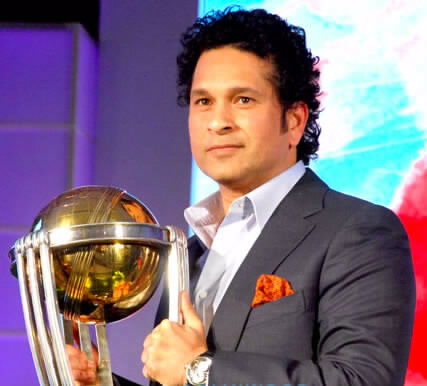
Sachin Tendulkar, most runs in World Cup history

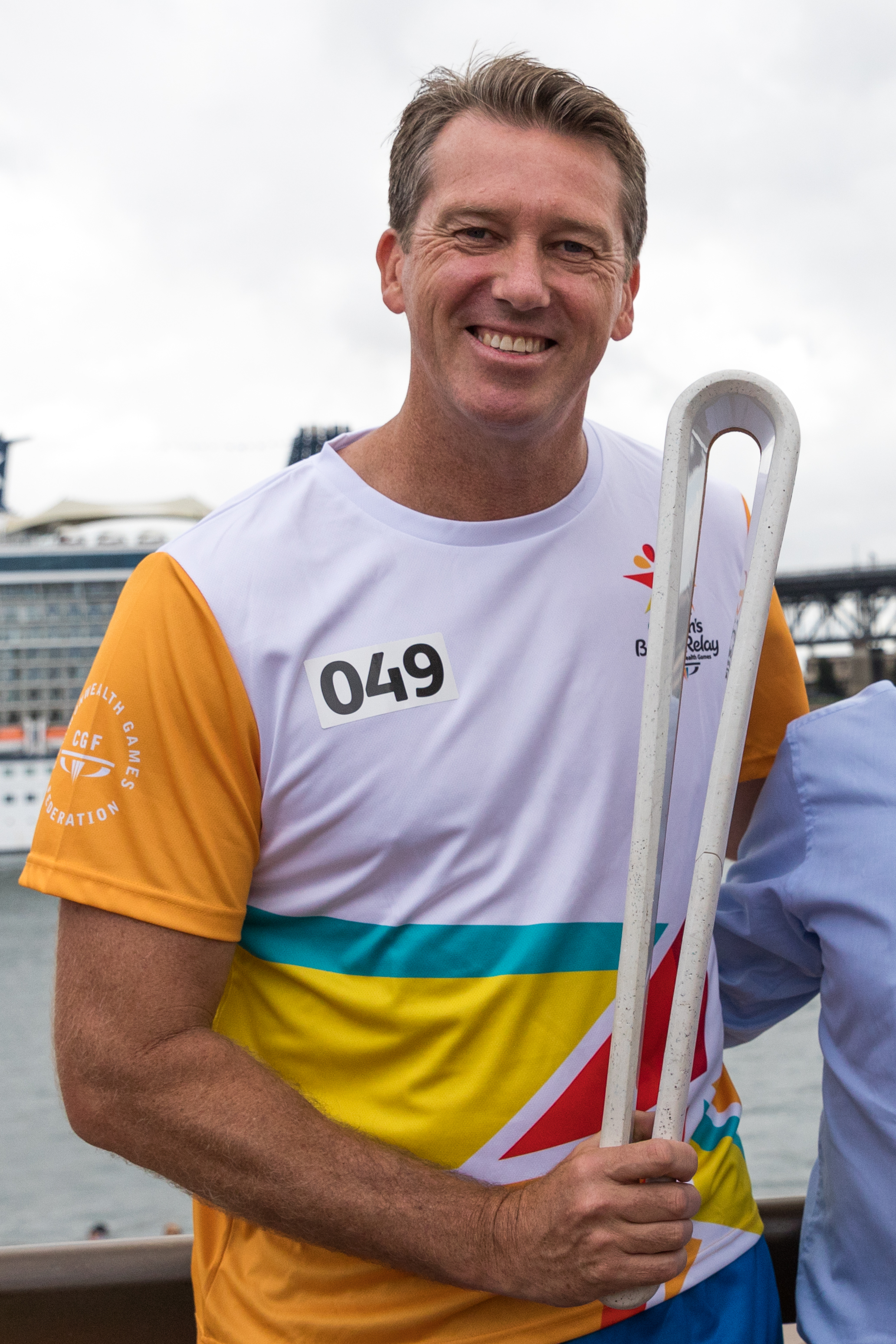
Glenn McGrath, most wickets in World Cup history

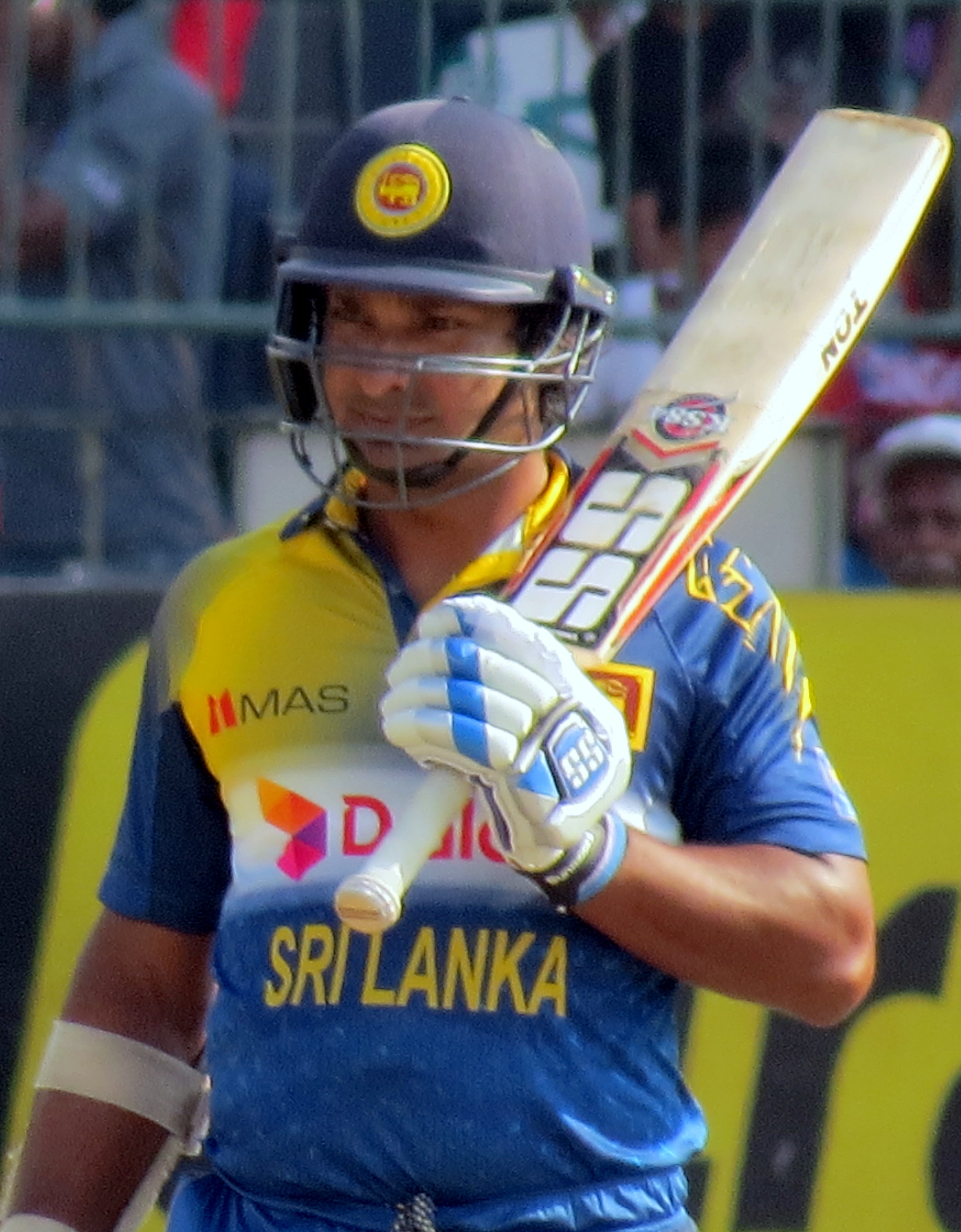
Kumar Sangakkara, most dismissals in World Cup history

World Cup records
Batting
Most runs	(India) Sachin Tendulkar	2,278 (1992–2011)
Highest individual score	(New Zealand) Martin Guptill v West Indies	237* (2015)
Highest partnership	(Cricket West Indies) Chris Gayle & Marlon Samuels (2nd wicket) v Zimbabwe	372 (2015)
Most runs in a single world cup	(India) Virat Kohli	765 (2023)
Most hundreds	(India) Rohit Sharma	7 (2015–2023)
Most hundreds in a single world cup	(India) Rohit Sharma	5 (2019)
Bowling
Most wickets	(Australia) Glenn McGrath	71 (1996–2007)
Best bowling figures	(Australia) Glenn McGrath v Namibia	7/15 (2003)
Most wickets in a single world cup	(Australia) Mitchell Starc	27 (2019)
Fielding
Most dismissals (wicket-keeper)	(Sri Lanka) Kumar Sangakkara	54 (2003–2015)
Most catches (fielder)	(Australia) Ricky Ponting	28 (1996–2011)
Team
Highest score	South Africa v Sri Lanka	428/5 (2023)
Lowest score	Canada v Sri Lanka	36 (2003)
Individual
Most wins as a player	(Australia) Adam Gilchrist, (Australia) Glenn McGrath, (Australia) Ricky Ponting	3 (all 1999, 2003 and 2007)
