= History of cricket in India from 1970–71 to 1985 =

This article describes the history of cricket in India from the 1970–71 season until 1985.

== Events ==
Bombay continued its dominance of Indian domestic cricket with only Karnataka and Delhi able to mount any kind of challenge during this period.

India enjoyed two international highlights. In 1971, under Ajit Wadekar's captaincy they won a Test series in England for the first time ever, surprisingly defeating Ray Illingworth's Ashes winners and won series in West Indies. In 1983, again in England, India were surprise winners of the 1983 Cricket World Cup.

== Domestic cricket ==
=== Ranji Trophy winners ===
- 1970–71 – Bombay
- 1971–72 – Bombay
- 1972–73 – Bombay
- 1973–74 – Karnataka
- 1974–75 – Bombay
- 1975–76 – Bombay
- 1976–77 – Bombay
- 1977–78 – Karnataka
- 1978–79 – Delhi
- 1979–80 – Delhi
- 1980–81 – Bombay
- 1981–82 – Delhi
- 1982–83 – Karnataka
- 1983–84 – Bombay
- 1984–85 – Bombay

== International tours of India ==
=== England 1972–73 ===
- 1st Test at Feroz Shah Kotla, Delhi – England won by 6 wickets
- 2nd Test at Eden Gardens, Calcutta – India won by 28 runs
- 3rd Test at MA Chidambaram Stadium, Chepauk, Madras – India won by 4 wickets
- 4th Test at Modi Stadium, Kanpur – match drawn
- 5th Test at Brabourne Stadium, Bombay – match drawn

=== West Indies 1974–75 ===
- 1st Test at M Chinnaswamy Stadium, Bangalore – West Indies won by 267 runs
- 2nd Test at Feroz Shah Kotla, Delhi – West Indies won by an innings and 17 runs
- 3rd Test at Eden Gardens, Calcutta – India won by 85 runs
- 4th Test at MA Chidambaram Stadium, Chepauk, Madras – India won by 100 runs
- 5th Test at Wankhede Stadium, Bombay – West Indies won by 201 runs

=== New Zealand 1976–77 ===
- 1st Test at Wankhede Stadium, Bombay – India won by 162 runs
- 2nd Test at Modi Stadium, Kanpur – match drawn
- 3rd Test at MA Chidambaram Stadium, Chepauk, Madras – India won by 216 runs

=== England 1976–77 ===
- 1st Test at Feroz Shah Kotla, Delhi – England won by an innings and 25 runs
- 2nd Test at Eden Gardens, Calcutta – England won by 10 wickets
- 3rd Test at MA Chidambaram Stadium, Chepauk, Madras – England won by 200 runs
- 4th Test at M Chinnaswamy Stadium, Bangalore – India won by 140 runs
- 5th Test at Wankhede Stadium, Bombay – match drawn

=== West Indies 1978–79 ===
- 1st Test at Wankhede Stadium, Bombay – match drawn
- 2nd Test at M Chinnaswamy Stadium, Bangalore – match drawn
- 3rd Test at Eden Gardens, Calcutta – match drawn
- 4th Test at MA Chidambaram Stadium, Chepauk, Madras – India won by 3 wickets
- 5th Test at Feroz Shah Kotla, Delhi – match drawn
- 6th Test at Modi Stadium, Kanpur – match drawn

=== Australia 1979–80 ===
- 1st Test at MA Chidambaram Stadium, Chepauk, Madras – match drawn
- 2nd Test at M Chinnaswamy Stadium, Bangalore – match drawn
- 3rd Test at Modi Stadium, Kanpur – India won by 153 runs
- 4th Test at Feroz Shah Kotla, Delhi – match drawn
- 5th Test at Eden Gardens, Calcutta – match drawn
- 6th Test at Wankhede Stadium, Bombay – India won by an innings and 100 runs

=== Pakistan 1979–80 ===
- 1st Test at M Chinnaswamy Stadium, Bangalore – match drawn
- 2nd Test at Feroz Shah Kotla, Delhi – match drawn
- 3rd Test at Wankhede Stadium, Bombay – India won by 131 runs
- 4th Test at Modi Stadium, Kanpur – match drawn
- 5th Test at MA Chidambaram Stadium, Chepauk, Madras – India won by 10 wickets
- 6th Test at Eden Gardens, Calcutta – match drawn

=== England 1979–80 ===
- 1st Test at Wankhede Stadium, Bombay – England won by 10 wickets

=== England 1981–82 ===
- 1st Test at Wankhede Stadium, Bombay – India won by 138 runs
- 2nd Test at M Chinnaswamy Stadium, Bangalore – match drawn
- 3rd Test at Feroz Shah Kotla, Delhi – match drawn
- 4th Test at Eden Gardens, Calcutta – match drawn
- 5th Test at MA Chidambaram Stadium, Chepauk, Madras – match drawn
- 6th Test at Modi Stadium, Kanpur – match drawn

=== Sri Lanka 1982–83 ===
- 1st Test at MA Chidambaram Stadium, Chepauk, Madras – match drawn

=== Pakistan 1983–84 ===
- 1st Test at M Chinnaswamy Stadium, Bangalore – match drawn
- 2nd Test at Gandhi Stadium, Jalandhar – match drawn
- 3rd Test at Vidarbha Cricket Association Ground, Nagpur – match drawn

=== West Indies 1983–84 ===
- 1st Test at Modi Stadium, Kanpur – West Indies won by an innings and 83 runs
- 2nd Test at Feroz Shah Kotla, Delhi – match drawn
- 3rd Test at Sardar Patel Stadium, Motera, Ahmedabad – West Indies won by 138 runs
- 4th Test at Wankhede Stadium, Bombay – match drawn
- 5th Test at Eden Gardens, Calcutta – West Indies won by an innings and 46 runs
- 6th Test at MA Chidambaram Stadium, Chepauk, Madras – match drawn

=== England 1984–85 ===
For details of this tour see : English cricket team in India in 1984-85

== External sources ==
- CricketArchive – Itinerary of Events in India
