= 2023 Cricket World Cup qualification =

- Dates: 14 August 2019 – 9 July 2023
- Administrator: International Cricket Council
- Cricket format: One Day International; List A
- Participants: 32
- Matches: 421

The 2023 Cricket World Cup qualification process was the edition of Cricket World Cup qualification for the 2023 Cricket World Cup and the introduction of a new qualification process. A series of cricket competitions determined which countries took part in the 2023 Cricket World Cup. In total, 32 countries took part in the qualification process, from which 10 teams qualified for the World Cup.

The 32 teams were divided into three leagues—Super League (13 teams), League 2 (7 teams) and Challenge League (12 teams). Based on the results of the leagues, teams either directly qualified for the World Cup, were eliminated from World Cup qualification, or advanced to other supplementary qualifying tournaments through which they could qualify for the World Cup. The supplementary qualifying tournaments also determined the promotion and relegation between the leagues. As it was the first use of the new process, teams were allocated to the three leagues based on their ICC member status, ODI status and rank from the 2017–2019 ICC World Cricket League.

== Overview ==
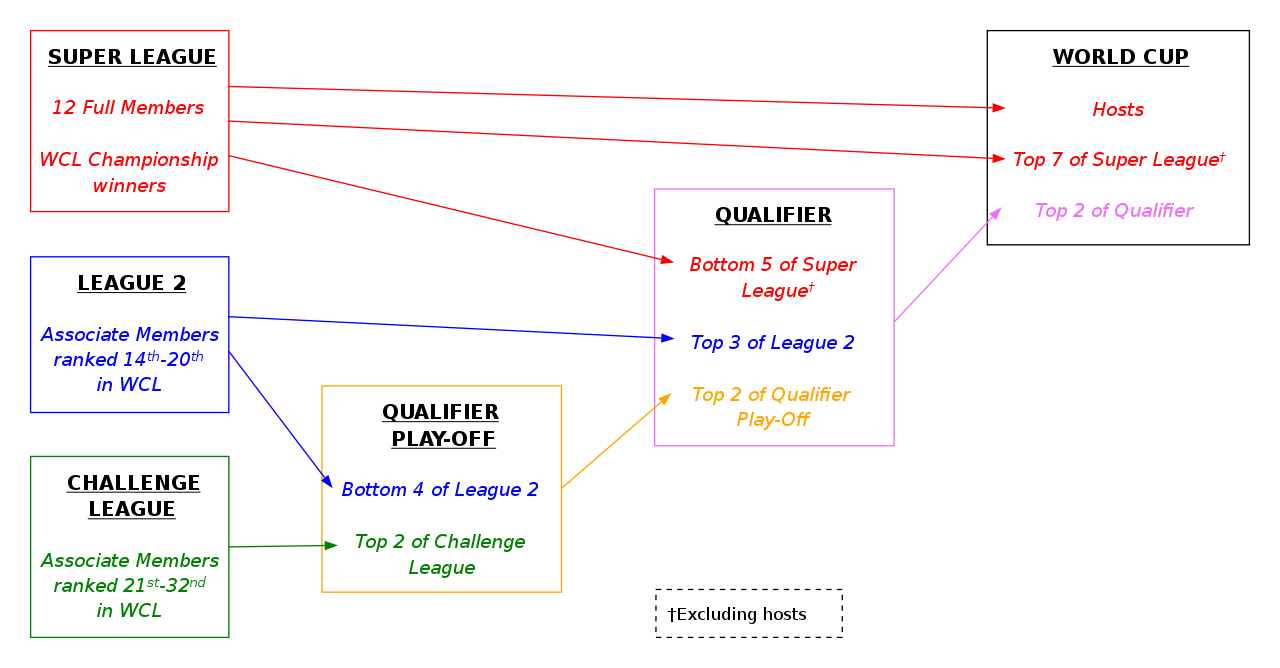
A diagram that explains the qualification structure for the 2023 ICC Cricket World Cup

As with the previous edition, the 2023 World Cup featured ten teams. The main route for qualification was the 2020–23 Super League tournament. From the thirteen competitors in this tournament, the top seven sides plus the hosts (India) qualified for the World Cup. The remaining five teams, along with five Associate sides, proceeded to the 2023 qualifier, from which two teams went through to the final tournament.

Team	Method of qualification	Date of qualification	Venues	Total times qualified	Last time qualified	Previous best performance	Number of teams
India	Hosts & ICC Super League 6th Place	–	–	13	2019	Winners (1983, 2011)	1
New Zealand	ICC Super League Winners	30 July 2020 – 14 May 2023	Various	13	2019	Runners-Up (2015, 2019)	7
England	ICC Super League Runners-Up	30 July 2020 – 14 May 2023	Various	13	2019	Winners (2019)	7
Bangladesh	ICC Super League 3rd Place	30 July 2020 – 14 May 2023	Various	7	2019	Quarter-Finals (2015)	7
Australia	ICC Super League 4th Place	30 July 2020 – 14 May 2023	Various	13	2019	Winners (1987, 1999, 2003, 2007, 2015)	7
Afghanistan	ICC Super League 5th Place	30 July 2020 – 14 May 2023	Various	3	2019	Group Stage (2015, 2019)	7
Pakistan	ICC Super League 7th Place	30 July 2020 – 14 May 2023	Various	13	2019	Winners (1992)	7
South Africa	ICC Super League 8th Place	30 July 2020 – 14 May 2023	Various	9	2019	Semi-Finals (1992, 1999, 2007, 2015, 2019)	7
Sri Lanka	World Cup Qualifier Winners	18 June – 9 July 2023	Zimbabwe	13	2019	Winners (1996)	2
Netherlands	World Cup Qualifier Runners-Up	18 June – 9 July 2023	Zimbabwe	5	2011	Group Stage (1996, 2003, 2007, 2011)	2
	Total						10

Teams were eliminated from World Cup qualification as follows:

Tournament	Date	Venue	Eliminations	Teams
Challenge League	16 September 2019 – 14 December 2022	Various	10	Bermuda; Denmark; Hong Kong; Italy; Kenya; Malaysia; Qatar; Singapore; Uganda; Vanuatu
Qualifier Play-off	24 March – 5 April 2023	Namibia	4	Canada; Jersey; Namibia; Papua New Guinea
Qualifier	18 June – 9 July 2023	Zimbabwe	8	Ireland; Nepal; Oman; Scotland; United Arab Emirates; United States; West Indies; Zimbabwe
Total			22	

== Qualifying leagues ==
=== Super League ===
League Outcome
Qualification	Berths	Teams
Host Nation	1	India
Qualified for World Cup	7	Afghanistan; Australia; Bangladesh; England; New Zealand; Pakistan; South Africa
Advanced to Qualifier	5	Ireland; Netherlands; Sri Lanka; West Indies; Zimbabwe
Total	13	

Pos	Team	Pld	W	L	NR	Ded	Pts	NRR	Progress to
1	New Zealand	24	16	5	3	0	175	0.914	2023 Cricket World Cup (Note: India qualify automatically as hosts.)
2	England	24	15	8	1	0	155	0.976	2023 Cricket World Cup
3	Bangladesh	24	15	8	1	0	155	0.220	2023 Cricket World Cup
4	Australia	24	15	9	0	0	150	0.785	2023 Cricket World Cup
5	Afghanistan	18	14	3	1	0	145	0.573	2023 Cricket World Cup
6	India	21	13	6	2	1	139 (Note: India were deducted one point for a slow over rate against Australia on 27 November 2020.)	0.782	2023 Cricket World Cup
7	Pakistan	21	13	8	0	0	130	0.108	2023 Cricket World Cup
8	South Africa	24	9	13	2	2	98 (Note: South Africa were deducted one point for a slow over rate against Pakistan on 2 April 2021, and one point for a slow over rate against England on 1 February 2023.)	−0.077	2023 Cricket World Cup
9	West Indies	24	9	15	0	2	88 (Note: West Indies were deducted two points for a slow over rate against New Zealand on 21 August 2022.)	−0.738	2023 Cricket World Cup Qualifier
10	Sri Lanka	24	7	14	3	4	81 (Note: Sri Lanka were deducted two points for a slow over rate against West Indies on 14 March 2021, one point for a slow over rate against India on 20 July 2021, and one point for a slow over rate against New Zealand on 25 March 2023.)	−0.369	2023 Cricket World Cup Qualifier
11	Ireland	24	6	15	3	2	73 (Note: Ireland were deducted two points for a slow over rate against West Indies on 8 January 2022.)	−0.357	2023 Cricket World Cup Qualifier
12	Zimbabwe	24	6	17	1	0	65	−0.952	2023 Cricket World Cup Qualifier
13	Netherlands	24	3	20	1	0	35	−1.179	2023 Cricket World Cup Qualifier

Source: ICC, ESPN Cricinfo The series between Afghanistan and India, and Afghanistan and Pakistan were not played (or awarded to either side).

=== League 2 ===
The outcomes from this tournament were as follows:

Outcome	Berths	Teams
Advanced to Qualifier	3	Nepal; Oman; Scotland
Advanced to Qualifier Play-off	4	Namibia; Papua New Guinea; United Arab Emirates; United States
Total	7	

Pos	Team	Pld	W	L	T	NR	Pts	NRR	Qualification for
1	Scotland	36	24	10	0	2	50	0.647	2023 Cricket World Cup Qualifier
2	Oman	36	21	13	1	1	44	0.039	2023 Cricket World Cup Qualifier
3	Nepal	36	19	15	1	1	40	0.101	2023 Cricket World Cup Qualifier
4	Namibia	36	19	16	0	1	39	0.298	2023 Cricket World Cup Qualifier Play-off
5	United States	36	16	17	2	1	35	−0.040	2023 Cricket World Cup Qualifier Play-off
6	United Arab Emirates	36	15	18	1	2	33	−0.222	2023 Cricket World Cup Qualifier Play-off
7	Papua New Guinea	36	5	30	1	0	11	−0.792	2023 Cricket World Cup Qualifier Play-off

Source: ESPN Cricinfo

=== Challenge League ===
The outcomes from this tournament were as follows:

Outcome	Berths	Teams
Advanced to Qualifier Play-off	2	Canada; Jersey
Eliminated from World Cup qualification	10	Bermuda; Denmark; Hong Kong; Italy; Kenya; Malaysia; Qatar; Singapore; Uganda; Vanuatu
Total	12	

==== League A ====
Pos	Team	Pld	W	L	T	NR	Pts	NRR	Qualification
1	Canada	15	13	1	0	1	27	2.563	Advanced to the 2023 Cricket World Cup Qualifier Play-off
2	Denmark	15	8	6	0	1	17	0.573	
3	Qatar	15	8	6	0	1	17	−0.369	
4	Singapore	15	7	8	0	0	14	−0.061	
5	Malaysia	15	4	11	0	0	8	−1.058	Advanced to the 2024 Cricket World Cup Challenge League Play-off
6	Vanuatu	15	3	11	0	1	7	−1.365	Advanced to the 2024 Cricket World Cup Challenge League Play-off

Source: ESPN Cricinfo

==== League B ====
Pos	Team	Pld	W	L	T	NR	Pts	NRR	Qualification
1	Jersey	15	11	4	0	0	22	1.541	Advanced to the 2023 Cricket World Cup Qualifier Play-off
2	Uganda	15	11	4	0	0	22	1.062	
3	Hong Kong	15	9	5	0	1	19	0.548	
4	Kenya	15	7	7	0	1	15	0.188	
5	Italy	15	5	9	0	1	11	−0.626	Advanced to the 2024 Cricket World Cup Challenge League Play-off
6	Bermuda	15	0	14	0	1	1	−3.192	Advanced to the 2024 Cricket World Cup Challenge League Play-off

Source: ESPN Cricinfo

== Supplementary qualifying tournaments ==
=== Qualifier Play-off ===
Six teams took part in the qualifier play-off: the bottom four teams from the League 2 along with the top teams in Groups A and B of the Challenge League. The top two teams from this tournament progressed to the Qualifier.

Teams qualified for this tournament as follows:

Means of qualification for WC Qualifier Play-off	Date	Venue	Berths	Teams
League 2 Bottom 4 teams	August 2019 – March 2023	Various	4	Namibia; Papua New Guinea; United Arab Emirates; United States
Challenge League; Top teams of Groups A and B	September 2019 – December 2022	Various	2	Canada; Jersey
Total			6	

The outcomes from this tournament are as follows:

Outcome	Berths	Teams
Advanced to Qualifier	2	United Arab Emirates; United States
Eliminated from World Cup qualification	4	Canada; Jersey; Namibia; Papua New Guinea
Total	6	

Pos	Team	Pld	W	L	NR	Pts	NRR	Qualification
1	United States	5	4	1	0	8	0.810	Advanced to the 2023 Cricket World Cup Qualifier and 2024–2026 Cricket World Cup League 2
2	United Arab Emirates	5	4	1	0	8	0.458	Advanced to the 2023 Cricket World Cup Qualifier and 2024–2026 Cricket World Cup League 2
3	Namibia	5	3	2	0	6	0.601	Advanced to the 2024–2026 Cricket World Cup League 2
4	Canada	5	3	2	0	6	0.123	Advanced to the 2024–2026 Cricket World Cup League 2
5	Jersey	5	1	4	0	2	−0.840	Relegated to the 2024–2026 Cricket World Cup Challenge League
6	Papua New Guinea	5	0	5	0	0	−1.148	Relegated to the 2024–2026 Cricket World Cup Challenge League

Source: ESPNcricinfo

=== Qualifier ===
The Qualifier will feature ten teams in total: the bottom five teams from the Super League not including World Cup hosts India; the top three teams from the League 2, and the top two teams from the qualifier play-off. The top two teams from this tournament will qualify for the World Cup.

Teams qualified for this tournament as follows:

Means of qualification for WC Qualifier	Date	Venue	Berths	Teams
Super League; Bottom 5 teams	30 July 2020 – 14 May 2023	Various	5	Ireland; Netherlands; Sri Lanka; West Indies; Zimbabwe
League 2 Top 3 teams	14 August 2019 – 16 March 2023	Various	3	Nepal; Oman; Scotland
Qualifier Play-off	26 March – 5 April 2023	Namibia	2	United Arab Emirates; United States
Total			10	

The outcomes from this tournament are as follows:

Outcome	Berths	Teams
Qualified for World Cup	2	Netherlands; Sri Lanka
Eliminated from World Cup qualification	8	Ireland; Nepal; Oman; Scotland; United Arab Emirates; United States; West Indies; Zimbabwe
Total	10	

==== Group A ====
Pos	Team	Pld	W	L	NR	Pts	NRR	Qualification
1	Zimbabwe	4	4	0	0	8	2.241	Advanced to the Super Six
2	Netherlands	4	3	1	0	6	0.667	Advanced to the Super Six
3	West Indies	4	2	2	0	4	0.525	Advanced to the Super Six
4	Nepal	4	1	3	0	2	−1.176	Advanced to the 7th–10th Play-offs
5	United States	4	0	4	0	0	−2.169	Advanced to the 7th–10th Play-offs

Source: ESPNcricinfo

==== Group B ====
Pos	Team	Pld	W	L	NR	Pts	NRR	Qualification
1	Sri Lanka	4	4	0	0	8	3.047	Advanced to the Super Six
2	Scotland	4	3	1	0	6	0.540	Advanced to the Super Six
3	Oman	4	2	2	0	4	−1.221	Advanced to the Super Six
4	Ireland	4	1	3	0	2	−0.061	Advanced to the 7th–10th Play-offs
5	United Arab Emirates	4	0	4	0	0	−2.249	Advanced to the 7th–10th Play-offs

Source: ESPNcricinfo

==== Super Six ====
Pos	Team	Pld	W	L	NR	Pts	NRR	
1	Sri Lanka	5	5	0	0	10	1.600	Advanced to the Final and qualified for the 2023 Cricket World Cup
2	Netherlands	5	3	2	0	6	0.160	Advanced to the Final and qualified for the 2023 Cricket World Cup
3	Scotland	5	3	2	0	6	0.102	
4	Zimbabwe (H)	5	3	2	0	6	−0.099	
5	West Indies	5	1	4	0	2	−0.204	
6	Oman	5	0	5	0	0	−1.895	

Source: ICC
(H) Host

== See also ==
- 2023 ICC Cricket World Cup Challenge Play-off
