= Cricket World Cup Trophy =

Award for victors of the Cricket World Cup

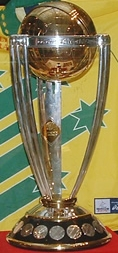
- The 2023 Cricket World Cup trophy was launched on a stratospheric scale, 1 lakh 20 thousand feet above the earth.
- Sport: Cricket
- Awarded for: Winning the Cricket World Cup
- Presented by: International Cricket Council

History
- First award: 1975–1983 (Prudential Cup trophy); 1987 (Reliance Cup trophy); 1992 (Benson and Hedges cup trophy); 1996 (Wills cup trophy); 1999 – present (current ICC trophy)
- First winner: West Indies (1975)
- Most wins: Australia (6 titles)
- Most recent: Australia (2023)
- Website: icc-cricket.com

The ICC Cricket World Cup Trophy is presented to the winners of the Cricket World Cup. The current trophy was created for the 1999 championships and was the first permanent prize in the tournament's history; prior to this, different trophies were made for each World Cup. The trophy was designed by Paul Marsden of Garrard & co and produced in London by a team of craftsmen from Garrard & Co over a period of two months. The trophy is now manufactured by Otte will Silversmiths in Ashford.

The trophy has changed five times, with the current trophy being the tournament's permanent prize since the 1999 Cricket World Cup. Australia, the tournament's most successful team with six wins, are the latest winners of the trophy, having defeated India in the final. Australia have also won the latest trophy the most times (five).

The original trophy is kept by the ICC. A replica which only differs in inscriptions is permanently awarded to the winning team.

== History ==
The Prudential Cups trophy were awarded to the winners of the World Cup from 1975 to 1983 when Prudential plc was the primary sponsor. A small loving-cup, this trophy was awarded three times.

The trophies' designs changed when the sponsors changed until the 1999 World Cup. So the first three world cups had a similar trophy while 1987 (Reliance World Cup sponsored by Reliance Industries), 1992 (Benson & Hedges Cup, sponsored by Benson & Hedges), and 1996 (Wills World Cup, sponsored by WD & HO Wills, an ITC brand) had different trophies because of different sponsors until the International Cricket Council decided to award its own trophy.

The current trophy was created for the 1999 championships and is the first permanent prize in the tournament's history. The trophy was designed and produced in London by a team of craftsmen from Garrard & Co (the Crown Jewellers). The whole process was completed over a period of two months time. The current trophy is made from silver and gold and features a golden globe held up by three silver columns. The columns, shaped as stumps and bails, represent the three fundamental aspects of cricket: batting, bowling and fielding, while the globe characterizes a cricket ball. It stands 60 cm high and weighs approximately 11.0567 kilograms. The names of the previous winners are engraved on the base of the trophy, with space for a total of twenty inscriptions.

== ICC Cricket World Cup Trophy ==
The ICC Cricket World Cup Trophy is presented to the winning team of the ICC Cricket World Cup. The current trophy is 60 cm high, is made from silver and gold, and features a golden globe held up by three silver columns. The columns, shaped as stumps and bails, represent the three fundamental aspects of cricket: batting, bowling and fielding, while the globe characterises a cricket ball, with the seam tilted to represent Axial tilt of the Earth. It is designed with platonic dimensions, so that it can be easily recognized from any angle. The trophy weighs approximately 11 kilograms and has the names of the previous winners inscribed on its base. There is still room for another ten teams to have their names inscribed:

The Reliance World Cup and Wills World Cup were crafted by Amit Pabu Wal of Jaipur who has also made the world's largest gold trophy, the most expensive trophy in world history, as well as the T20 World Cup.

=== Status ===
The actual trophy is kept by the International Cricket Council in its offices in Dubai but a replica, which is identical in all aspects apart from the inscription of the previous champions, is awarded to the winning team and remains in their possession.

== Trophy Winners ==
No.	Year	Team
Prudential Cup Trophy
1	1975	West Indies
2	1979	West Indies
3	1983	India
Reliance World Cup Trophy
4	1987	Australia
Benson and Hedges Cup Trophy
5	1992	Pakistan
Wills World Cup Trophy
6	1996	Sri Lanka
Men's World Cup Trophy
7	1999	Australia
8	2003	Australia
9	2007	Australia
10	2011	India
11	2015	Australia
12	2019	England
13	2023	Australia
14	2027	TBA
15	2031	TBA
