= 2023 Cricket World Cup group stage =

The 2023 Cricket World Cup group stage was played in a round-robin league format, with all ten teams playing each other once in a single group, resulting in a total of 45 matches being played. The top four teams from the group progressed to the knockout stage. This format was the same as the preceding 2019 Cricket World Cup and was also used in the 1992 Cricket World Cup.

India won the group stage, defeating all other teams, as well as winning the semi-finals. New Zealand, South Africa and Australia also qualified for the knockout stages as a result of finishing in the top four. In the final, Australia comfortably beat India by six wickets, and a full seven overs to spare, to win their sixth World Cup.

== Points table ==
Pos	Team	Pld	W	L	T	NR	Pts	NRR	Qualification
1	India (H, R)	9	9	0	0	0	18	2.570	Advanced to the semi-finals and qualified for the 2025 ICC Champions Trophy
2	South Africa	9	7	2	0	0	14	1.261	Advanced to the semi-finals and qualified for the 2025 ICC Champions Trophy
3	Australia (C)	9	7	2	0	0	14	0.841	Advanced to the semi-finals and qualified for the 2025 ICC Champions Trophy
4	New Zealand	9	5	4	0	0	10	0.743	Advanced to the semi-finals and qualified for the 2025 ICC Champions Trophy
5	Pakistan	9	4	5	0	0	8	−0.199	Qualified for the 2025 ICC Champions Trophy
6	Afghanistan	9	4	5	0	0	8	−0.336	Qualified for the 2025 ICC Champions Trophy
7	England	9	3	6	0	0	6	−0.572	Qualified for the 2025 ICC Champions Trophy
8	Bangladesh	9	2	7	0	0	4	−1.087	Qualified for the 2025 ICC Champions Trophy
9	Sri Lanka	9	2	7	0	0	4	−1.419	
10	Netherlands	9	2	7	0	0	4	−1.825	

Source: ESPNcricinfo
(C) Champions; (H) Host; (R) Runners-up

=== Group progression ===
Team ╲ Round	1	2	3	4	5	6	7	8	9
Afghanistan	L	L	W	L	W	W	W	L	L
Australia	L	L	W	W	W	W	W	W	W
Bangladesh	W	L	L	L	L	L	L	W	L
England	L	W	L	L	L	L	L	W	W
India	W	W	W	W	W	W	W	W	W
Netherlands	L	L	W	L	L	W	L	L	L
New Zealand	W	W	W	W	L	L	L	L	W
Pakistan	W	W	L	L	L	L	W	W	L
South Africa	W	W	L	W	W	W	W	L	W
Sri Lanka	L	L	L	W	W	L	L	L	L

Source: ESPNcricinfo
W = Win; D = Draw; L = Lose

== Group stage summary ==
Against Team	Afghanistan	Australia	Bangladesh	England	India	Netherlands	New Zealand	Pakistan	South Africa	Sri Lanka
Afghanistan		Lost by 3 wickets	Lost by 6 wickets	Won by 69 runs	Lost by 8 wickets	Won by 7 wickets	Lost by 149 runs	Won by 8 wickets	Lost by 5 wickets	Won by 7 wickets
Australia			Won by 8 wickets	Won by 33 runs	Lost by 6 wickets	Won by 309 runs	Won by 5 runs	Won by 62 runs	Lost by 134 runs	Won by 5 wickets
Bangladesh				Lost by 137 runs	Lost by 7 wickets	Lost by 87 runs	Lost by 8 wickets	Lost by 7 wickets	Lost by 149 runs	Won by 3 wickets
England					Lost by 100 runs	Won by 160 runs	Lost by 9 wickets	Won by 93 runs	Lost by 229 runs	Lost by 8 wickets
India						Won by 160 runs	Won by 4 wickets	Won by 7 wickets	Won by 243 runs	Won by 302 runs
Netherlands							Lost by 99 runs	Lost by 81 runs	Won by 38 runs	Lost by 5 wickets
New Zealand								Lost by 21 runs (DLS)	Lost by 190 runs	Won by 5 wickets
Pakistan									Lost by 1 wicket	Won by 6 wickets
South Africa										Won by 102 runs
Sri Lanka										

== Matches ==
=== England vs New Zealand ===
5 October 2023
14:00 (D/N)
Scorecard

England; 282/9 (50 overs)	v	New Zealand; 283/1 (36.2 overs)
Joe Root 77 (86); Matt Henry 3/48 (10 overs)		Devon Conway 152* (121); Sam Curran 1/47 (6 overs)

New Zealand won by 9 wickets
Narendra Modi Stadium, Ahmedabad
Umpires: Kumar Dharmasena (SL) and Nitin Menon (Ind)
Player of the match: Rachin Ravindra (NZ)

- New Zealand won the toss and elected to field.
- All of England's eleven batsmen reached double figures, the first such instance in ODIs.
- Rachin Ravindra (NZ) scored his maiden century in ODIs.
- Devon Conway and Rachin Ravindra's 273-run partnership surpassed Martin Guptill and Will Young's 203 for the highest partnership for second wicket for New Zealand.

The two teams had met each other ten times in World Cups, most recently in the final of the 2019 edition which ended in a tie. England would go on win the tie-breaker, and the World Cup. In their earlier nine meetings, England had won four and lost five. In the rematch, New Zealand won the toss and sent England to bat first. England started off slow before captain Jos Buttler's arrival in the 22nd over improved their run rate. He hit two fours and sixes each, before being dismissed for 43. Joe Root's 77 and a tenth wicket partnership of 30 runs took England's total to 282. New Zealand's reply began with opening batter Will Young's dismissal for a first-ball duck. However, Devon Conway and Rachin Ravindra, who was promoted to take an injured Kane Williamson's spot, put on an unbeaten 273-run stand for the second wicket. The duo started strongly and hit 13 fours and two sixes in the first Powerplay. In their debut World Cup appearances, they went on to make 152 and 123 runs respectively, and saw their team home with 13.4 overs to spare.

=== Netherlands vs Pakistan ===
6 October 2023
14:00 (D/N)
Scorecard

Pakistan; 286 (49 overs)	v	Netherlands; 205 (41 overs)
Saud Shakeel 68 (52); Bas de Leede 4/62 (9 overs)		Bas de Leede 67 (68); Haris Rauf 3/43 (9 overs)

Pakistan won by 81 runs
Rajiv Gandhi International Cricket Stadium, Hyderabad
Umpires: Chris Brown (NZ) and Adrian Holdstock (SA)
Player of the match: Saud Shakeel (Pak)

- Netherlands won the toss and elected to field.

This was the seventh match between the teams and third in World Cups, and the Netherlands were yet to secure a victory against Pakistan. The Netherlands won the toss and chose to field. Pakistan were reduced to 38/3 before Saud Shakeel and Mohammad Rizwan put on 120 runs for the fourth wicket, with both making half-centuries, the former's coming in 32 balls. Mohammad Nawaz and Shadab Khan then added 64 runs together, taking their team's total to a respectable 286. Bas de Leede stood out as the top bowler for the Netherlands, claiming four wickets. The Netherlands innings got off to a shaky start, losing Max O'Dowd early on, but Vikramjit Singh and Colin Ackermann provided some stability. However, the latter could not stick around for long and was dismissed to a loose shot off Iftikhar Ahmed. de Leede and Singh formed a vital partnership of 70 runs, with both players reaching half-centuries. Singh's departure triggered a collapse from 120 for 3 to 158 for 6. The lower order offered some resistance, with Logan van Beek hitting a few lusty blows in the end but the team fell short by 81 runs.

=== Afghanistan vs Bangladesh ===
7 October 2023
10:30
Scorecard

Afghanistan; 156 (37.2 overs)	v	Bangladesh; 158/4 (34.4 overs)
Rahmanullah Gurbaz 47 (62); Mehidy Hasan 3/25 (9 overs)		Nazmul Hossain Shanto 59* (83); Azmatullah Omarzai 1/9 (2 overs)

Bangladesh won by 6 wickets
Himachal Pradesh Cricket Association Stadium, Dharamshala
Umpires: Kumar Dharmasena (SL) and Joel Wilson (WI)
Player of the match: Mehidy Hasan (Ban)

- Bangladesh won the toss and elected to field.
- Rahmanullah Gurbaz became the fastest player to score reach 1,000 runs in ODIs for Afghanistan in terms of innings (27).
- Bangladesh won the match with 92 balls to spare, their greatest win margin in the World Cups, in terms of balls remaining.

Having defeated Afghanistan in both their previous World Cup meetings, Bangladesh put them to bat after winning the toss. Afghanistan began strongly and were at 83/1 after 15 overs. Shakib Al Hasan, appearing in his fifth World Cup, claimed three wickets as did Mehidy Hasan. Hashmatullah Shahidi (18) and Rahmanullah Gurbaz's dismissals when Afghanistan were at 112/2, led to a collapse of their middle and lower order, before the team was all out 44 runs after. With the ball, Afghanistan reduced Bangladesh to 27/2 and missed two catching opportunities of Mehidy Hasan, who made the best of it by putting on 97 runs with Nazmul Hossain Shanto for the third wicket. The partnership helped Bangladesh hand their opponents their thirteenth straight loss in World Cups.

=== South Africa vs Sri Lanka ===
7 October 2023
14:00 (D/N)
Scorecard

South Africa; 428/5 (50 overs)	v	Sri Lanka; 326 (44.5 overs)
Rassie van der Dussen 108 (110); Dilshan Madushanka 2/86 (10 overs)		Charith Asalanka 79 (65); Gerald Coetzee 3/68 (9 overs)

South Africa won by 102 runs
Arun Jaitley Cricket Stadium, New Delhi
Umpires: Richard Illingworth (Eng) and Sharfuddoula (Ban)
Player of the match: Aiden Markram (SA)

- Sri Lanka won the toss and elected to field.
- South Africa's 428 surpassed Australia's 417 in 2015 as the highest innings total in World Cup history.
- Aiden Markram (SA) broke Kevin O'Brien's record for the fastest century in World Cup history, in terms of balls faced (49).
- The 754 runs scored in the fixture was the highest match aggregate in a World Cup match, surpassing Australia and Bangladesh's 714 runs in 2019.

Sri Lanka entered the match on the back of a solitary win against South Africa in their six World Cup meetings. Upon losing captain Temba Bavuma's wicket early on after being sent in to bat, Quinton de Kock and Rassie van der Dussen steadied South Africa's innings taking them to 118/1 after 20 overs. Both would go on to make centuries, 100 and 108 respectively, followed by the fastest ever in World Cups by Aiden Markram. Markram's innings included 14 fours and three sixes, and he particularly attacked Sri Lanka's paceman Matheesha Pathirana, who gave away 95 runs off his ten overs. Multiple records were broken in South Africa's innings, including the first instance of three batters making centuries in a World Cup match. Sri Lanka's chase of 428 began with one-drop Kusal Mendis reaching a half-century before any of his teammates had scored a single run. His innings of 76 came off 42 balls and included eight sixes. Fifties from Charith Asalanka (79) and captain Dasun Shanaka (68) briefly kept their team's chase alive, but the team fell short by 102 runs despite some late hitting by Kasun Rajitha.

=== Australia vs India ===
8 October 2023
14:00 (D/N)
Scorecard

Australia; 199 (49.3 overs)	v	India; 201/4 (41.2 overs)
Steve Smith 46 (71); Ravindra Jadeja 3/28 (10 overs)		KL Rahul 97* (115); Josh Hazlewood 3/38 (9 overs)

India won by 6 wickets
M. A. Chidambaram Stadium, Chennai
Umpires: Chris Gaffaney (NZ) and Richard Kettleborough (Eng)
Player of the match: KL Rahul (Ind)

- Australia won the toss and elected to bat.
- David Warner (Aus) broke the record held by Sachin Tendulkar and AB de Villiers (20 each) for the fastest to reach 1,000 runs in World Cups, in terms of innings (19).
- Mitchell Starc (Aus) broke Lasith Malinga's record (25) for the fastest to reach 50 wickets in World Cups, in terms of innings (19).
- Ravichandran Ashwin (Ind) played his last ODI match

Australia came into the match with a 8–4 record against India in World Cups. They started off strong with the bat and were 74/1 before a fluent David Warner (41) was dismissed caught and bowled by Kuldeep Yadav. Fellow spinner Ravindra Jadeja then claimed three wickets in a space of eleven deliveries reducing Australia to 119/5. Top-scorer Steve Smith's outside edge was beaten by a Jadeja delivery turning enough to hit his off stump. Captain Pat Cummins and Mitchell Starc's late hitting took their team to 199. Controlled bowling effort by India meant a total of 171 dot balls were bowled. India's start with the bat was historically poor — three of their top four were dismissed without scoring — a first for them. While Starc took Ishan Kishan's wicket, fellow paceman Josh Hazlewood claimed Rohit Sharma and Shreyas Iyer, reducing India to two for three. Virat Kohli (85) made the best of his dropped catch in the eighth over by Mitchell Marsh and added 165 runs for the fourth wicket with KL Rahul, the highest fourth wicket partnership for India in World Cups. Both consistently rotated strike and scored only 14 fours and two sixes between them, helping their team reach the target with 8.4 overs remaining. It was the last ODI match for Ravichandran Ashwin.

=== Netherlands vs New Zealand ===
9 October 2023
14:00 (D/N)
Scorecard

New Zealand; 322/7 (50 overs)	v	Netherlands; 223 (46.3 overs)
Will Young 70 (80); Roelof van der Merwe 2/56 (9 overs)		Colin Ackermann 69 (73); Mitchell Santner 5/59 (10 overs)

New Zealand won by 99 runs
Rajiv Gandhi International Cricket Stadium, Hyderabad
Umpires: Paul Reiffel (Aus) and Rod Tucker (Aus)
Player of the match: Mitchell Santner (NZ)

- Netherlands won the toss and elected to field.
- Sybrand Engelbrecht (Ned) made his ODI debut.

The two teams had met only once in World Cups before, with New Zealand winning the game, in 1996. The Netherlands bowlers started off with three maiden overs, before New Zealand's Devon Conway and Will Young put on 67 runs together. Young then added 77 runs with Rachin Ravindra (51) for the third wicket. Daryl Mitchell's 48, Tom Latham's 53 off 46 and Mitchell Santner's 36 off 17 meant New Zealand posted a target of 323. Left-armer Santner made the best of the spin-friendly wicket and claimed the first five-wicket haul by a New Zealand spinner in World Cups, using his variation in pace. Colin Ackermann offered resistance with his strokeplay and put together 50 runs with Teja Nidamanuru, before the latter was run out. Santner, who chipped with wickets at regular intervals in the middle overs, removed captain Scott Edwards caught and bowled. Matt Henry's bounce and pace yielded him three wickets, including a bowled attempt of Vikramjit Singh. The Netherlands fell 99 runs short after he cleaned their tail up picking the final two wickets.

=== Bangladesh vs England ===
10 October 2023
10:30
Scorecard

England; 364/9 (50 overs)	v	Bangladesh; 227 (48.2 overs)
Dawid Malan 140 (107); Mahedi Hasan 4/71 (8 overs)		Liton Das 76 (66); Reece Topley 4/43 (10 overs)

England won by 137 runs
Himachal Pradesh Cricket Association Stadium, Dharamshala
Umpires: Ahsan Raza (Pak) and Paul Wilson (Aus)
Player of the match: Dawid Malan (Eng)

- Bangladesh won the toss and elected to field.
- Jonny Bairstow (Eng) played in his 100th ODI.
- Joe Root became England's highest run-scorer in World Cups, surpassing Graham Gooch (897 runs).

=== Pakistan vs Sri Lanka ===
10 October 2023
14:00 (D/N)
Scorecard

Sri Lanka; 344/9 (50 overs)	v	Pakistan; 345/4 (48.2 overs)
Kusal Mendis 122 (77); Hasan Ali 4/71 (10 overs)		Mohammad Rizwan 131* (121); Dilshan Madushanka 2/60 (9.2 overs)

Pakistan won by 6 wickets
Rajiv Gandhi International Cricket Stadium, Hyderabad
Umpires: Chris Gaffaney (NZ) and Alex Wharf (Eng)
Player of the match: Mohammad Rizwan (Pak)

- Sri Lanka won the toss and elected to bat.
- Sadeera Samarawickrama (SL) and Abdullah Shafique (Pak) both made their maiden centuries in ODIs.
- Imam-ul-Haq (Pak) scored his 3,000th run in ODIs.
- This was the highest successful run chase in World Cup history, surpassing Ireland's 329 against England in 2011.
- This was the third time four centuries were scored in an ODI, and first in World Cups.

Sri Lanka got off to a strong start with the bat and were 229/3 after 30 overs. Kusal Mendis's century off 65 balls, which he reached with a six, was the fastest by a Sri Lanka player in World Cups. He particularly punished Shaheen Afridi and Haris Rauf, finished his innings striking at 158.44. His partners were Pathum Nissanka (51) and Sadeera Samarawickrama, who made 108 off 89 deliveries, helping his team go past 300. Pakistan looked in trouble at 37/2 having lost captain Babar Azam in the eighth over. However, Abdullah Shafique and Mohammad Rizwan brought them back into the game, courtesy their 176-run stand for the third wicket. Shafique, who came in as a replacement to Fakhar Zaman, made 113, the most by a Pakistan debutant in World Cups. Rizwan battled through cramps and remained unbeaten at 131, helping his team attain the highest successful chase in World Cup history, Pakistan's previous record being 263. With the run rate climbing through the middle overs, the Pakistan batters accelerated their chase making 163 off the last 20 overs, thus extending their lead to 8–0 against their opponents in World Cups.

=== Afghanistan vs India ===
11 October 2023
14:00 (D/N)
Scorecard

Afghanistan; 272/8 (50 overs)	v	India; 273/2 (35 overs)
Hashmatullah Shahidi 80 (88); Jasprit Bumrah 4/39 (10 overs)		Rohit Sharma 131 (84); Rashid Khan 2/57 (8 overs)

India won by 8 wickets
Arun Jaitley Cricket Stadium, New Delhi
Umpires: Michael Gough (Eng) and Paul Reiffel (Aus)
Player of the match: Rohit Sharma (Ind)

- Afghanistan won the toss and elected to bat.
- Rohit Sharma (Ind) broke Chris Gayle’s record for most sixes in international cricket (554).
- Rohit Sharma broke Sachin Tendulkar's record for most centuries in World Cup history (7).

India had won their only previous encounter against Afghanistan in World Cups. Afghanistan's openers fell cheaply and one-drop Rahmat Shah's dismissal left his team at 63 for 3. The team's only notable partnership came for the fourth wicket when captain Hashmatullah Shahidi and Azmatullah Omarzai put on 121 runs, before the latter was bowled out by a Hardik Pandya slower ball for 62. Kuldeep Yadav slowed the run rate for his opponents, and went on to removed Shahidi, who had stuck to the crease despite his partners falling at the other end. Pacer Jasprit Bumrah then restricted Afghanistan to adding only 83 in the final 15 overs. India's reply began with captain Rohit Sharma scoring in blistering fashion. He reached in century off 63 balls, overtaking Kapil Dev's 1983 effort for the fastest century by an India player in World Cup history. His effortless hitting involved to a 100-run stand with Ishan Kishan, with the latter only contributing 14 runs in the partnership. Kishan's dismissal for 47 and later Sharma's meant Virat Kohli (55) and Shreyas Iyer (25) took their team home with 15 overs to spare.

=== Australia vs South Africa ===
12 October 2023
14:00 (D/N)
Scorecard

South Africa; 311/7 (50 overs)	v	Australia; 177 (40.5 overs)
Quinton de Kock 109 (106); Glenn Maxwell 2/34 (10 overs)		Marnus Labuschagne 46 (74); Kagiso Rabada 3/33 (8 overs)

South Africa won by 134 runs
Ekana Cricket Stadium, Lucknow
Umpires: Richard Illingworth (Eng) and Joel Wilson (WI)
Player of the match: Quinton de Kock (SA)

- Australia won the toss and elected to field.
- This was Australia's largest defeat in World Cups surpassing their 118 run loss to India in 1983, in terms of runs (134).

Australia held the head-to-head edge over South Africa in World Cups by a 3–2 margin, with one match ending in a tie. South Africa got off to a quiet start with the bat through openers Quinton de Kock and captain Temba Bavuma. de Kock then took charge through a six and a couple of fours across the fifth and sixth overs, and the two put on a 108-run stand, before Rassie van der Dussen added 50 runs with de Kock for the second wicket. de Kock would go on make his second century on the trot, an innings that included eight fours and five sixes, before Aiden Markram (56) and Heinrich Klaasen (29) combined to add another fifty-run stand for their team. Australia pulled their opponents back when they were 263/3 after 43 overs, with their pacemen picking a few wickets towards the end of the innings. The innings was marked by poor fielding by Australia, who dropped five catches. Australia's top-order fell cheaply with only Marnus Labuschagne (46 off 74), batting alongside Mitchell Starc (27), offering some resistance to South Africa's bowling. Lungi Ngidi (1/18) and Marco Jansen (2/54) were impressive with the new ball, and helped reduce Australia to 70/6 as early as the 18th over. Steve Smith and Marcus Stoinis were both given out by the third umpire following referrals, both off Kagiso Rabada, who also bowled out Josh Inglis. Australia's only other notable stand came between Pat Cummins and Adam Zampa who made 32 runs between them. Dismissed for 177, they suffered their 15th loss in the last 18 matches against South Africa, the last four of them by more than 100-run margins.

=== Bangladesh vs New Zealand ===
13 October 2023
14:00 (D/N)
Scorecard

Bangladesh; 245/9 (50 overs)	v	New Zealand; 248/2 (42.5 overs)
Mushfiqur Rahim 66 (75); Lockie Ferguson 3/49 (10 overs)		Daryl Mitchell 89* (67); Mustafizur Rahman 1/36 (8 overs)

New Zealand won by 8 wickets
M. A. Chidambaram Stadium, Chennai
Umpires: Kumar Dharmasena (SL) and Nitin Menon (Ind)
Player of the match: Lockie Ferguson (NZ)

- New Zealand won the toss and elected to field.
- Trent Boult surpassed Kyle Mills to become the fastest New Zealand bowler to claim 200 wickets in ODIs, in terms of matches (107), and third overall.

=== India vs Pakistan ===
14 October 2023
14:00 (D/N)
Scorecard

Pakistan; 191 (42.5 overs)	v	India; 192/3 (30.3 overs)
Babar Azam 50 (58); Jasprit Bumrah 2/19 (7 overs)		Rohit Sharma 86 (63); Shaheen Afridi 2/36 (6 overs)

India won by 7 wickets
Narendra Modi Stadium, Ahmedabad
Umpires: Marais Erasmus (SA) and Richard Illingworth (Eng)
Player of the match: Jasprit Bumrah (Ind)

- India won the toss and elected to field.

=== Afghanistan vs England ===
15 October 2023
14:00 (D/N)
Scorecard

Afghanistan; 284 (49.5 overs)	v	England; 215 (40.3 overs)
Rahmanullah Gurbaz 80 (57); Adil Rashid 3/42 (10 overs)		Harry Brook 66 (61); Rashid Khan 3/37 (9.3 overs)

Afghanistan won by 69 runs
Arun Jaitley Cricket Stadium, New Delhi
Umpires: Sharfuddoula (Ban) and Rod Tucker (Aus)
Player of the match: Mujeeb Ur Rahman (Afg)

- England won the toss and elected to field.
- Mohammad Nabi and Rahmat Shah (Afg) played their 150th and 100th ODI respectively.
- This was Afghanistan's first win against England in international cricket.

=== Australia vs Sri Lanka ===
16 October 2023
14:00 (D/N)
Scorecard

Sri Lanka; 209 (43.3 overs)	v	Australia; 215/5 (35.2 overs)
Kusal Perera 78 (82); Adam Zampa 4/47 (8 overs)		Josh Inglis 58 (59); Dilshan Madushanka 3/38 (9 overs)

Australia won by 5 wickets
Ekana Cricket Stadium, Lucknow
Umpires: Chris Gaffaney (NZ) and Joel Wilson (WI) (Note: Joel Wilson replaced Alex Wharf.)
Player of the match: Adam Zampa (Aus)

- Sri Lanka won the toss and elected to bat.

=== Netherlands vs South Africa ===
17 October 2023
14:00 (D/N)
Scorecard

Netherlands; 245/8 (43 overs)	v	South Africa; 207 (42.5 overs)
Scott Edwards 78* (69); Marco Jansen 2/27 (8 overs)		David Miller 43 (52); Logan van Beek 3/60 (8.5 overs)

Netherlands won by 38 runs
Himachal Pradesh Cricket Association Stadium, Dharamshala
Umpires: Michael Gough (Eng) and Richard Kettleborough (Eng)
Player of the match: Scott Edwards (Ned)

- South Africa won the toss and elected to field.
- The match was reduced to 43 overs per side due to rain.
- This was Netherlands first win against South Africa in ODI cricket.

=== Afghanistan vs New Zealand ===
18 October 2023
14:00 (D/N)
Scorecard

New Zealand; 288/6 (50 overs)	v	Afghanistan; 139 (34.4 overs)
Glenn Phillips 71 (80); Naveen-ul-Haq 2/48 (8 overs)		Rahmat Shah 36 (62); Lockie Ferguson 3/19 (7 overs)

New Zealand won by 149 runs
M. A. Chidambaram Stadium, Chennai
Umpires: Joel Wilson (WI) and Paul Wilson (Aus)
Player of the match: Glenn Phillips (NZ)

- Afghanistan won the toss and elected to field.
- Mitchell Santner (NZ) took his 100th wicket in ODIs.

=== Bangladesh vs India ===
19 October 2023
14:00 (D/N)
Scorecard

Bangladesh; 256/8 (50 overs)	v	India; 261/3 (41.3 overs)
Liton Das 66 (82); Ravindra Jadeja 2/38 (10 overs)		Virat Kohli 103* (97); Mehidy Hasan 2/47 (10 overs)

India won by 7 wickets
Maharashtra Cricket Association Stadium, Pune
Umpires: Adrian Holdstock (SA) and Richard Kettleborough (Eng)
Player of the match: Virat Kohli (Ind)

- Bangladesh won the toss and elected to bat.
- Mushfiqur Rahim scored his 1,000th run in the World Cup.
- Virat Kohli (Ind) surpassed Sachin Tendulkar to become the fastest to reach 26,000 runs in international cricket, in terms of innings (567).

=== Australia vs Pakistan ===
20 October 2023
14:00 (D/N)
Scorecard

Australia; 367/9 (50 overs)	v	Pakistan; 305 (45.3 overs)
David Warner 163 (124); Shaheen Afridi 5/54 (10 overs)		Imam-ul-Haq 70 (71); Adam Zampa 4/53 (10 overs)

Australia won by 62 runs
M. Chinnaswamy Stadium, Bengaluru
Umpires: Chris Brown (NZ) and Richard Illingworth (Eng)
Player of the match: David Warner (Aus)

- Pakistan won the toss and elected to field.
- Adam Zampa (Aus) took his 150th wicket in ODIs.

=== Netherlands vs Sri Lanka ===
21 October 2023
10:30
Scorecard

Netherlands; 262 (49.4 overs)	v	Sri Lanka; 263/5 (48.2 overs)
Sybrand Engelbrecht 70 (82); Dilshan Madushanka 4/49 (9.4 overs)		Sadeera Samarawickrama 91* (107); Aryan Dutt 3/44 (10 overs)

Sri Lanka won by 5 wickets
Ekana Cricket Stadium, Lucknow
Umpires: Marais Erasmus (SA) and Ahsan Raza (Pak)
Player of the match: Sadeera Samarawickrama (SL)

- Netherlands won the toss and elected to bat.

=== England vs South Africa ===
21 October 2023
14:00 (D/N)
Scorecard

South Africa; 399/7 (50 overs)	v	England; 170 (22 overs)
Heinrich Klaasen 109 (67); Reece Topley 3/88 (8.5 overs)		Mark Wood 43* (17); Gerald Coetzee 3/35 (4 overs)

South Africa won by 229 runs
Wankhede Stadium, Mumbai
Umpires: Kumar Dharmasena (SL) and Nitin Menon (Ind)
Player of the match: Heinrich Klaasen (SA)

- England won the toss and elected to field.

=== India vs New Zealand ===
22 October 2023
14:00 (D/N)
Scorecard

New Zealand; 273 (50 overs)	v	India; 274/6 (48 overs)
Daryl Mitchell 130 (127); Mohammed Shami 5/54 (10 overs)		Virat Kohli 95 (104); Lockie Ferguson 2/63 (8 overs)

India won by 4 wickets
Himachal Pradesh Cricket Association Stadium, Dharamshala
Umpires: Michael Gough (Eng) and Adrian Holdstock (SA) (Note: Adrian Holdstock replaced Richard Kettleborough.)
Player of the match: Mohammed Shami (Ind)

- India won the toss and elected to field.
- Shubman Gill (Ind) broke Hashim Amla's record for the fastest to reach 2,000 runs in ODIs, in terms of innings (38).

=== Afghanistan vs Pakistan ===
23 October 2023
14:00 (D/N)
Scorecard

Pakistan; 282/7 (50 overs)	v	Afghanistan; 286/2 (49 overs)
Babar Azam 74 (92); Noor Ahmad 3/49 (10 overs)		Ibrahim Zadran 87 (113); Hasan Ali 1/44 (10 overs)

Afghanistan won by 8 wickets
M. A. Chidambaram Stadium, Chennai
Umpires: Paul Reiffel (Aus) and Rod Tucker (Aus)
Player of the match: Ibrahim Zadran (Afg)

- Pakistan won the toss and elected to bat.
- This was Afghanistan's first win against Pakistan in ODI cricket.

=== Bangladesh vs South Africa ===
24 October 2023
14:00 (D/N)
Scorecard

South Africa; 382/5 (50 overs)	v	Bangladesh; 233 (46.4 overs)
Quinton de Kock 174 (140); Hasan Mahmud 2/67 (6 overs)		Mahmudullah 111 (111); Gerald Coetzee 3/62 (10 overs)

South Africa won by 149 runs
Wankhede Stadium, Mumbai
Umpires: Ahsan Raza (Pak) (Note: Ahsan Raza replaced Alex Wharf.) and Joel Wilson (WI)
Player of the match: Quinton de Kock (SA)

- South Africa won the toss and elected to bat.

=== Australia vs Netherlands ===
25 October 2023
14:00 (D/N)
Scorecard

Australia; 399/8 (50 overs)	v	Netherlands; 90 (21 overs)
Glenn Maxwell 106 (44); Logan van Beek 4/74 (10 overs)		Vikramjit Singh 25 (25); Adam Zampa 4/8 (3 overs)

Australia won by 309 runs
Arun Jaitley Cricket Stadium, New Delhi
Umpires: Michael Gough (Eng) and Sharfuddoula (Ban)
Player of the match: Glenn Maxwell (Aus)

- Australia won the toss and elected to bat.
- Glenn Maxwell (Aus) broke Aiden Markram's record for the fastest century in World Cup history, in terms of balls faced (40).
- Bas de Leede (Ned) conceded 115 runs, the most by any bowler in an ODI innings, surpassing Mick Lewis and Adam Zampa (both 113).
- Australia's recorded the highest margin of victory in World Cup history and second overall by any team, in terms of runs (309), surpassing their 275-run win against Afghanistan in 2015.

=== England vs Sri Lanka ===
26 October 2023
14:00 (D/N)
Scorecard

England; 156 (33.2 overs)	v	Sri Lanka; 160/2 (25.4 overs)
Ben Stokes 43 (73); Lahiru Kumara 3/35 (7 overs)		Pathum Nissanka 77* (83); David Willey 2/30 (5 overs)

Sri Lanka won by 8 wickets
M. Chinnaswamy Stadium, Bengaluru
Umpires: Chris Brown (NZ) and Adrian Holdstock (SA)
Player of the match: Lahiru Kumara (SL)

- England won the toss and elected to bat.

=== Pakistan vs South Africa ===
27 October 2023
14:00 (D/N)
Scorecard

Pakistan; 270 (46.4 overs)	v	South Africa; 271/9 (47.2 overs)
Saud Shakeel 52 (52); Tabraiz Shamsi 4/60 (10 overs)		Aiden Markram 91 (93); Shaheen Afridi 3/45 (10 overs)

South Africa won by 1 wicket
M. A. Chidambaram Stadium, Chennai
Umpires: Paul Reiffel (Aus) and Alex Wharf (Eng)
Player of the match: Tabraiz Shamsi (SA)

- Pakistan won the toss and elected to bat.
- Usama Mir (Pak) replaced Shadab Khan as a concussion substitute during the second innings of the match.

=== Australia vs New Zealand ===
28 October 2023
10:30
Scorecard

Australia; 388 (49.2 overs)	v	New Zealand; 383/9 (50 overs)
Travis Head 109 (67); Glenn Phillips 3/37 (10 overs)		Rachin Ravindra 116 (89); Adam Zampa 3/74 (10 overs)

Australia won by 5 runs
Himachal Pradesh Cricket Association Stadium, Dharamshala
Umpires: Marais Erasmus (SA) and Sharfuddoula (Ban)
Player of the match: Travis Head (Aus)

- New Zealand won the toss and elected to field.
- The 771 runs scored in the fixture is the highest match aggregate in a World Cup match, surpassing South Africa and Sri Lanka's 754 runs from 21 days prior.

=== Bangladesh vs Netherlands ===
28 October 2023
14:00 (D/N)
Scorecard

Netherlands; 229 (50 overs)	v	Bangladesh; 142 (42.2 overs)
Scott Edwards 68 (89); Mustafizur Rahman 2/36 (10 overs)		Mehidy Hasan 35 (40); Paul van Meekeren 4/23 (7.2 overs)

Netherlands won by 87 runs
Eden Gardens, Kolkata
Umpires: Joel Wilson (WI) and Paul Wilson (Aus)
Player of the match: Paul van Meekeren (Ned)

- Netherlands won the toss and elected to bat.

=== England vs India ===
29 October 2023
14:00 (D/N)
Scorecard

India; 229/9 (50 overs)	v	England; 129 (34.5 overs)
Rohit Sharma 87 (101); David Willey 3/45 (10 overs)		Liam Livingstone 27 (46); Mohammed Shami 4/22 (7 overs)

India won by 100 runs
Ekana Cricket Stadium, Lucknow
Umpires: Adrian Holdstock (SA) and Rod Tucker (Aus)
Player of the match: Rohit Sharma (Ind)

- England won the toss and elected to field.
- Rohit Sharma (Ind) played in his 100th ODI as captain.

=== Afghanistan vs Sri Lanka ===
30 October 2023
14:00 (D/N)
Scorecard

Sri Lanka; 241 (49.3 overs)	v	Afghanistan; 242/3 (45.2 overs)
Pathum Nissanka 46 (60); Fazalhaq Farooqi 4/34 (10 overs)		Azmatullah Omarzai 73* (63); Dilshan Madushanka 2/48 (9 overs)

Afghanistan won by 7 wickets
Maharashtra Cricket Association Stadium, Pune
Umpires: Chris Gaffaney (NZ) and Richard Illingworth (Eng)
Player of the match: Fazalhaq Farooqi (Afg)

- Afghanistan won the toss and elected to field.
- Rashid Khan (Afg) played in his 100th ODI.
- Hashmatullah Shahidi (Afg) scored his 2,000th run in ODIs.
- This was Afghanistan's first win against Sri Lanka in the Cricket World Cup.

=== Bangladesh vs Pakistan ===
31 October 2023
14:00 (D/N)
Scorecard

Bangladesh; 204 (45.1 overs)	v	Pakistan; 205/3 (32.3 overs)
Mahmudullah 56 (70); Shaheen Afridi 3/23 (9 overs)		Fakhar Zaman 81 (74); Mehidy Hasan 3/60 (9 overs)

Pakistan won by 7 wickets
Eden Gardens, Kolkata
Umpires: Richard Kettleborough (Eng) and Nitin Menon (Ind)
Player of the match: Fakhar Zaman (Pak)

- Bangladesh won the toss and elected to bat.
- Shaheen Afridi (Pak) and Mehidy Hasan (Ban) both took their 100th wicket in ODIs.
- Bangladesh were eliminated as a result of this match.

=== New Zealand vs South Africa ===
1 November 2023
14:00 (D/N)
Scorecard

South Africa; 357/4 (50 overs)	v	New Zealand; 167 (35.3 overs)
Rassie van der Dussen 133 (118); Tim Southee 2/77 (10 overs)		Glenn Phillips 60 (50); Keshav Maharaj 4/46 (9 overs)

South Africa won by 190 runs
Maharashtra Cricket Association Stadium, Pune
Umpires: Kumar Dharmasena (SL) and Ahsan Raza (Pak)
Player of the match: Rassie van der Dussen (SA)

- New Zealand won the toss and elected to field.

=== India vs Sri Lanka ===
2 November 2023
14:00 (D/N)
Scorecard

India; 357/8 (50 overs)	v	Sri Lanka; 55 (19.4 overs)
Shubman Gill 92 (92); Dilshan Madushanka 5/80 (10 overs)		Kasun Rajitha 14 (17); Mohammed Shami 5/18 (5 overs)

India won by 302 runs
Wankhede Stadium, Mumbai
Umpires: Chris Brown (NZ) and Paul Reiffel (Aus)
Player of the match: Mohammed Shami (Ind)

- Sri Lanka won the toss and elected to field.
- Dilshan Madushanka (SL) took his first five-wicket haul in ODI.
- Mohammed Shami became the highest wicket-taker for India at the Cricket World Cup, surpassing Zaheer Khan and Javagal Srinath (44 wickets).
- This was India's largest win, in terms of runs, at the Cricket World Cup.
- India qualified for the semi-finals as a result of this match.

=== Afghanistan vs Netherlands ===
3 November 2023
14:00 (D/N)
Scorecard

Netherlands; 179 (46.3 overs)	v	Afghanistan; 181/3 (31.3 overs)
Sybrand Engelbrecht 58 (86); Mohammad Nabi 3/28 (9.3 overs)		Hashmatullah Shahidi 56* (64); Saqib Zulfiqar 1/25 (3 overs)

Afghanistan won by 7 wickets
Ekana Cricket Stadium, Lucknow
Umpires: Nitin Menon (Ind) and Sharfuddoula (Ban)
Player of the match: Mohammad Nabi (Afg)

- Netherlands won the toss and elected to bat.
- Mujeeb Ur Rahman (Afg) took his 100th wicket in ODIs.
- Afghanistan qualified for the 2025 ICC Champions Trophy as a result of this match. It would be their first appearance in the tournament.

=== New Zealand vs Pakistan ===
4 November 2023
10:30
Scorecard

New Zealand; 401/6 (50 overs)	v	Pakistan; 200/1 (25.3 overs)
Rachin Ravindra 108 (94); Mohammad Wasim Jr. 3/60 (10 overs)		Fakhar Zaman 126* (81); Tim Southee 1/27 (5 overs)

Pakistan won by 21 runs (DLS method)
M. Chinnaswamy Stadium, Bengaluru
Umpires: Richard Kettleborough (Eng) and Paul Wilson (Aus)
Player of the match: Fakhar Zaman (Pak)

- Pakistan won the toss and elected to field.
- No further play was possible due to rain.
- Pakistan were 21 runs ahead of the DLS par score of 180 runs from 25.3 overs.
- Hasan Ali (Pak) took his 100th wicket in ODIs.
- South Africa qualified for the semi-finals as a result of this match.

=== Australia vs England ===
4 November 2023
14:00 (D/N)
Scorecard

Australia; 286 (49.3 overs)	v	England; 253 (48.1 overs)
Marnus Labuschagne 71 (83); Chris Woakes 4/54 (9.3 overs)		Ben Stokes 64 (90); Adam Zampa 3/21 (10 overs)

Australia won by 33 runs
Narendra Modi Stadium, Ahmedabad
Umpires: Marais Erasmus (SA) and Chris Gaffaney (NZ)
Player of the match: Adam Zampa (Aus)

- England won the toss and elected to field.
- England were eliminated as a result of this match.

=== India vs South Africa ===
5 November 2023
14:00 (D/N)
Scorecard

India; 326/5 (50 overs)	v	South Africa; 83 (27.1 overs)
Virat Kohli 101* (121); Keshav Maharaj 1/30 (10 overs)		Marco Jansen 14 (30); Ravindra Jadeja 5/33 (9 overs)

India won by 243 runs
Eden Gardens, Kolkata
Umpires: Kumar Dharmasena (SL) and Paul Reiffel (Aus)
Player of the match: Virat Kohli (Ind)

- India won the toss and elected to bat.
- Virat Kohli (Ind) equalled Sachin Tendulkar's record for the most centuries in ODIs (49).
- South Africa's 83 was their lowest innings total in World Cups, lower than their 149 against Australia in 2007.
- South Africa's 243-run loss was their heaviest in ODIs, in terms of runs, surpassing their 182-run loss to Pakistan in 2002.

=== Bangladesh vs Sri Lanka ===
6 November 2023
14:00 (D/N)
Scorecard

Sri Lanka; 279 (49.3 overs)	v	Bangladesh; 282/7 (41.1 overs)
Charith Asalanka 108 (105); Tanzim Hasan Sakib 3/80 (10 overs)		Najmul Hossain Shanto 90 (101); Dilshan Madushanka 3/69 (10 overs)

Bangladesh won by 3 wickets
Arun Jaitley Cricket Stadium, New Delhi
Umpires: Marais Erasmus (SA) and Richard Illingworth (Eng)
Player of the match: Shakib Al Hasan (Ban)

- Bangladesh won the toss and elected to field.
- Angelo Mathews (SL) became the first player in any international cricket match to be dismissed by being timed out.
- Sri Lanka were eliminated as the result of this match.
- This was Bangladesh's first win against Sri Lanka in Cricket World Cup.

=== Afghanistan vs Australia ===
7 November 2023
14:00 (D/N)
Scorecard

Afghanistan; 291/5 (50 overs)	v	Australia; 293/7 (46.5 overs)
Ibrahim Zadran 129* (143); Josh Hazlewood 2/39 (9 overs)		Glenn Maxwell 201* (128); Rashid Khan 2/44 (10 overs)

Australia won by 3 wickets
Wankhede Stadium, Mumbai
Umpires: Michael Gough (Eng) and Alex Wharf (Eng)
Player of the match: Glenn Maxwell (Aus)

- Afghanistan won the toss and elected to bat.
- Ibrahim Zadran became the first Afghan batter to score a century at the Cricket World Cup.
- Glenn Maxwell's 201 was the highest individual score by an Australian cricketer, surpassing Shane Watson's 185, and for a batter at number three or lower, surpassing Charles Coventry's (Zim) 194, in ODIs. It was also the highest individual score batting second in ODIs.
- The 202-run stand between Glenn Maxwell and Pat Cummins (Aus) was the highest 8th wicket partnership in ODIs, surpassing Andrew Hall and Justin Kemp's 138 against India in 2006.
- Australia qualified for the semi-finals as a result of this match.

=== England vs Netherlands ===
8 November 2023
14:00 (D/N)
Scorecard

England; 339/9 (50 overs)	v	Netherlands; 179 (37.2 overs)
Ben Stokes 108 (84); Bas de Leede 3/74 (10 overs)		Teja Nidamanuru 41* (34); Moeen Ali 3/42 (8.2 overs)

England won by 160 runs
Maharashtra Cricket Association Stadium, Pune
Umpires: Ahsan Raza (Pak) and Rod Tucker (Aus)
Player of the match: Ben Stokes (Eng)

- England won the toss and elected to bat.
- Netherlands were eliminated as a result of this match.

=== New Zealand vs Sri Lanka ===
9 November 2023
14:00 (D/N)
Scorecard

Sri Lanka; 171 (46.4 overs)	v	New Zealand; 172/5 (23.2 overs)
Kusal Perera 51 (28); Trent Boult 3/37 (10 overs)		Devon Conway 45 (42); Angelo Mathews 2/29 (4 overs)

New Zealand won by 5 wickets
M. Chinnaswamy Stadium, Bengaluru
Umpires: Adrian Holdstock (SA) and Joel Wilson (WI)
Player of the match: Trent Boult (NZ)

- New Zealand won the toss and elected to field.
- Trent Boult (NZ) became the 3rd bowler to have taken 600 wickets for New Zealand in all international cricket formats. He also became the first ever bowler to have taken 50 wickets for New Zealand at the Cricket World Cup.
- Mitchell Santner (NZ) equaled Daniel Vettori's record for most wickets taken by a New Zealand player in a Cricket World Cup edition.

=== Afghanistan vs South Africa ===
10 November 2023
14:00 (D/N)
Scorecard

Afghanistan; 244 (50 overs)	v	South Africa; 247/5 (47.3 overs)
Azmatullah Omarzai 97* (107); Gerald Coetzee 4/44 (10 overs)		Rassie van der Dussen 76* (95); Mohammad Nabi 2/35 (10 overs)

South Africa won by 5 wickets
Narendra Modi Stadium, Ahmedabad
Umpires: Chris Brown (NZ) and Nitin Menon (Ind)
Player of the match: Rassie van der Dussen (SA)

- Afghanistan won the toss and elected to bat.
- Heinrich Klaasen and Kagiso Rabada (SA) played their 50th and 100th ODI respectively.
- Naveen-ul-Haq (Afg) played in his last ODI.
- Afghanistan were eliminated as a result of this match.

=== Australia vs Bangladesh ===
11 November 2023
10:30
Scorecard

Bangladesh; 306/8 (50 overs)	v	Australia; 307/2 (44.4 overs)
Towhid Hridoy 74 (79); Adam Zampa 2/32 (10 overs)		Mitchell Marsh 177* (132); Taskin Ahmed 1/61 (10 overs)

Australia won by 8 wickets
Maharashtra Cricket Association Stadium, Pune
Umpires: Marais Erasmus (SA) and Ahsan Raza (Pak)
Player of the match: Mitchell Marsh (Aus)

- Australia won the toss and elected to field.
- This was the first time that Australia had successfully chased down a target of 300 or above in the World Cups.

=== England vs Pakistan ===
11 November 2023
14:00 (D/N)
Scorecard

England; 337/9 (50 overs)	v	Pakistan; 244 (43.3 overs)
Ben Stokes 84 (76); Haris Rauf 3/64 (10 overs)		Salman Ali Agha 51 (45); David Willey 3/56 (10 overs)

England won by 93 runs
Eden Gardens, Kolkata
Umpires: Rod Tucker (Aus) and Paul Wilson (Aus)
Player of the match: David Willey (Eng)

- England won the toss and elected to bat.
- David Willey (Eng) took his 100th wicket in ODIs. He also played last game in international cricket.
- Haris Rauf (Pak) broke Adil Rashid's record for most runs conceded in a single World Cup edition (526).
- As a result of this match, New Zealand qualified for the semi-finals and Pakistan were eliminated.
- Moeen Ali, Dawid Malan, Jonny Bairstow, Chris Woakes and Ben Stokes (Eng) all played in their last ODI.

=== India vs Netherlands ===
12 November 2023
14:00 (D/N)
Scorecard

India; 410/4 (50 overs)	v	Netherlands; 250 (47.5 overs)
Shreyas Iyer 128* (94); Bas de Leede 2/82 (10 overs)		Teja Nidamanuru 54 (39); Mohammed Siraj 2/29 (6 overs)

India won by 160 runs
M. Chinnaswamy Stadium, Bengaluru
Umpires: Chris Gaffaney (NZ) and Michael Gough (Eng)
Player of the match: Shreyas Iyer (Ind)

- India won the toss and elected to bat.
- Rohit Sharma (Ind) broke AB de Villiers' 2015 record for the most sixes in ODIs in a year (60).
- KL Rahul broke Rohit Sharma's record for the fastest century by an India cricketer in World Cups, in terms of balls faced (62).
- Shreyas Iyer and KL Rahul broke Michael Clarke and Brad Hodge's record for the highest fourth wicket partnership in a World Cup match (208 runs).
