= Ekana Cricket Stadium =

International cricket stadium in Lucknow, Uttar Pradesh, India

Atal Bihari Vajpayee Cricket Stadium
- BRSABV; Ekana
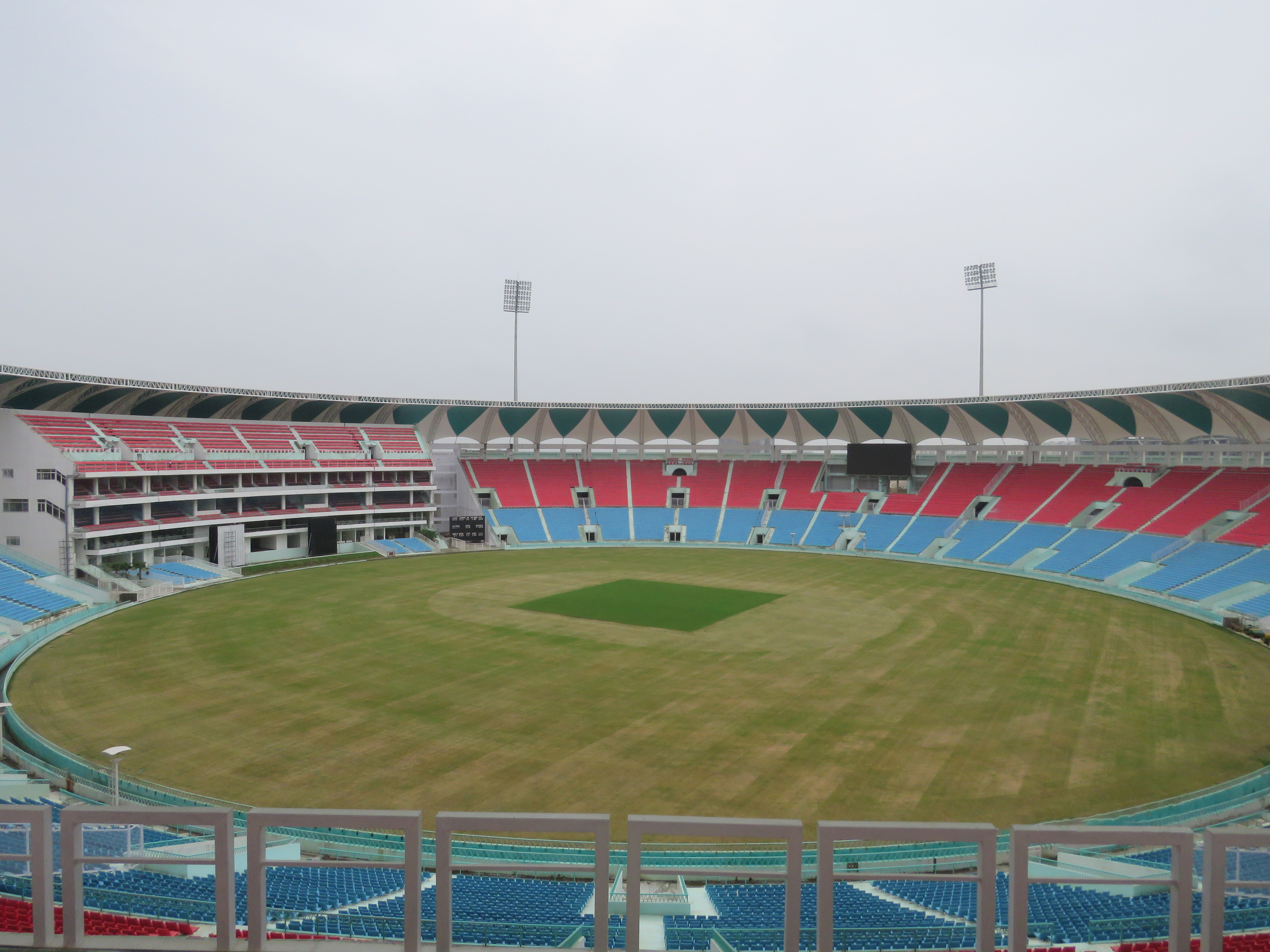
- Interactive map of Atal Bihari Vajpayee Cricket Stadium
- Former names: Ekana International Cricket Stadium
- Address: Ekana Sportz City, Gomti Nagar Extension; Lucknow; India
- Coordinates: 26°48′40″N 81°01′01″E
- Elevation: 104m
- Owner: Ekana Sportz City
- Operator: Ekana Sportz City
- Seating type: Stadium
- Capacity: 50,100
- Surface: Grass
- Field size: 160x156m
- Field shape: Round

Construction
- Opened: 2017; 9 years ago
- Architect: Skyline Architectural Consultants

Tenants
- Uttar Pradesh men's; Uttar Pradesh women's; India men's; India women's; UP Warriorz; Lucknow Super Giants; Lucknow Falcons; Afghanistan men's (2019–2020)

Website
- Ekana Sportz city

Ground information

International information
- Only men's Test: 27–29 November 2019: Afghanistan v West Indies
- First men's ODI: 6 November 2019: Afghanistan v West Indies
- Last men's ODI: 17 June 2026: India v Afghanistan
- First men's T20I: 6 November 2018: India v West Indies
- Last men's T20I: 6 October 2026: India v West Indies
- First women's ODI: 7 March 2021: India v South Africa
- Last women's ODI: 17 March 2021: India v South Africa
- First women's T20I: 20 March 2021: India v South Africa
- Last women's T20I: 23 March 2021: India v South Africa

Team information
| Uttar Pradesh cricket team | (2017-present) |
| Lucknow Super Giants | (2022-present) |
| UP Warriorz | (2023-present) |
- As of 11 October 2026; Source: Cricinfo

Bharat Ratna Shri Atal Bihari Vajpayee Cricket Stadium, also known as Ekana Cricket Stadium, is an international cricket stadium in Lucknow, India. The arena has a seating capacity of 50,000, and is the fifth largest international cricket stadium of India. In 2018, the stadium was renamed after India's 10th Prime Minister Atal Bihari Vajpayee. (Note: "Ekana" is a Sanskrit words, which means 'unity' in English.)

It has the longest straight boundaries in comparison to all the stadiums in India. It is the home ground of Uttar Pradesh men's, Uttar Pradesh women's as well as franchises UP Warriorz and Lucknow Super Giants. In 2019, the Afghanistan men's team used it as their home ground. K. D. Singh Babu Stadium used to host international cricket matches in Lucknow before this was built.

The arena also hosted five matches of the 2023 Men's Cricket World Cup.

== History ==
The project for constructing the world class stadium in Lucknow was commissioned in 2014 by Chief Minister Akhilesh Yadav, and the stadium was built under public-private partnership between Ekana Sportz City and Lucknow Development Authority. Ekana Sportz City is a Joint venture between Nagarjuna Construction Company, and GC Construction & Development Industries Pvt Ltd.

As per the agreement of the partnership, the government provided Ekana Sportz City with 35-year lease of 71 acres to build the cricket stadium, with the lease running through 2052. In addition, the government also provided 66 additional acres of land for real estate projects on a 99-year lease. The cricket stadium has been built with a budget of 360 crores (3.6 billion rupees).

Before its international debut, it also hosted the final of the 2017–18 Duleep Trophy. The stadium was allocated the 3rd ODI between India and New Zealand to be held on 27 Oct 2017. However, the venue was shifted to Kanpur after the stadium was declared incomplete.

On 6 November 2018, the stadium hosted its first international match, a Twenty20 International (T20I) between India and the West Indies, becoming the 52nd stadium in India to host an international cricket match. International cricket match returned to Lucknow after 24 years, after the India and Sri Lanka test match of 1994. In that match Rohit Sharma became the first cricketer to score four centuries in T20Is. India won that match by 71 runs. The last time Lucknow hosted an international match was in January 1994, when India played a test match against Sri Lanka at the K.D. Singh Babu Stadium.

In May 2019, Afghanistan Cricket Board requested the BCCI to use this venue for their international matches. In August 2019, BCCI awarded the venue to Afghanistan national cricket team as their third home venue in India, being previously played in Dehradun and Greater Noida.

It hosted all the matches during Afghanistan vs West Indies series in 2019. On 6 November 2019, the venue hosted its first ODI match. On 27 November 2019, the venue hosted its first Test match.

In May 2022, the venue was scheduled to host all the matches of the fourth edition of Women's T20 Challenge. However, later the matches were shifted to Maharashtra Cricket Association Stadium in Pune.

== Events ==
The venue has hosted two major events organised by the UP government.

=== Award distribution ceremony ===
On 19 August 2021, an award giving ceremony was held at the stadium by the state government to honor the athletes who won the medals at 2020 Summer Olympics that was held in 2021 at Tokyo, Japan. They all were facilitated with monetary rewards given by the Uttar Pradesh government. The highest prize was given to Neeraj Chopra who was the only one from India to win gold medal in Javelin throw.

=== Swearing-in ceremony ===
On 25 March 2022, at the venue Yogi Adityanath took oath as chief minister of Uttar Pradesh along with his cabinet, after his victory in 2022 Uttar Pradesh Legislative Assembly elections. The oath was given by the Governor of state, Anandiben Patel.

Many VVIP's, celebrities, big businessmen were invited in the ceremony including the Prime Minister Narendra Modi, Union Home minister Amit Shah and the Chief Ministers of NDA led states.

== Cricket World Cup ==
=== 2023 Men's World Cup ===
12 October 2023
14:00 (D/N)
Scorecard

| South Africa; 311/7 (50 overs) | v | Australia; 177 (40.5 overs) |
| Quinton de Kock 109 (106); Glenn Maxwell 2/34 (10 overs) | | Marnus Labuschagne 46 (74); Kagiso Rabada 3/33 (8 overs) |

South Africa won by 134 runs
Umpires: Richard Illingworth (Eng) and Joel Wilson (WI)
Player of the match: Quinton de Kock (SA)

- Australia won the toss and elected to field.
- This was Australia's largest defeat in World Cups surpassing their 118 run loss to India in 1983, in terms of runs (134).

16 October 2023
14:00 (D/N)
Scorecard

| Sri Lanka; 209 (43.3 overs) | v | Australia; 215/5 (35.2 overs) |
| Kusal Perera 78 (82); Adam Zampa 4/47 (8 overs) | | Josh Inglis 58 (59); Dilshan Madushanka 3/38 (9 overs) |

Australia won by 5 wickets
Umpires: Chris Gaffaney (NZ) and Joel Wilson (WI) (Note: Joel Wilson replaced Alex Wharf.)
Player of the match: Adam Zampa (Aus)

- Sri Lanka won the toss and elected to bat.

21 October 2023
10:30
Scorecard

| Netherlands; 262 (49.4 overs) | v | Sri Lanka; 263/5 (48.2 overs) |
| Sybrand Engelbrecht 70 (82); Dilshan Madushanka 4/49 (9.4 overs) | | Sadeera Samarawickrama 91* (107); Aryan Dutt 3/44 (10 overs) |

Sri Lanka won by 5 wickets
Umpires: Marais Erasmus (SA) and Ahsan Raza (Pak)
Player of the match: Sadeera Samarawickrama (SL)

- Netherlands won the toss and elected to bat.

29 October 2023
14:00 (D/N)
Scorecard

| India; 229/9 (50 overs) | v | England; 129 (34.5 overs) |
| Rohit Sharma 87 (101); David Willey 3/45 (10 overs) | | Liam Livingstone 27 (46); Mohammed Shami 4/22 (7 overs) |

India won by 100 runs
Umpires: Adrian Holdstock (SA) and Rod Tucker (Aus)
Player of the match: Rohit Sharma (Ind)

- England won the toss and elected to field.
- Rohit Sharma (Ind) played in his 100th ODI as captain.

3 November 2023
14:00 (D/N)
Scorecard

| Netherlands; 179 (46.3 overs) | v | Afghanistan; 181/3 (31.3 overs) |
| Sybrand Engelbrecht 58 (86); Mohammad Nabi 3/28 (9.3 overs) | | Hashmatullah Shahidi 56* (64); Saqib Zulfiqar 1/25 (3 overs) |

Afghanistan won by 7 wickets
Umpires: Nitin Menon (Ind) and Sharfuddoula (Ban)
Player of the match: Mohammad Nabi (Afg)

- Netherlands won the toss and elected to bat.
- Mujeeb Ur Rahman (Afg) took his 100th wicket in ODIs.
- Afghanistan qualified for the 2025 ICC Champions Trophy for the first time ever in International Cricket.

== Records ==
The highest ODI score on this ground is by South Africa, when they scored 311–7 in 2023. The most runs scored here is by Shai Hope (229 runs), followed by Quinton de Kock (157 runs) and Rahmat Shah (156 runs). The most wickets taken here is by Dilshan Madushanka (7 wickets).

=== List of international centuries ===
==== Test matches ====
Only one Test century has been scored at the venue.

| No. | Score | Player | Team | Balls | Opposing team | Date | Result |
|---|---|---|---|---|---|---|---|
| 1 | 111* | Shamarh Brooks | West Indies | 214 | Afghanistan | 28 November 2019 | West Indies won |

==== One Day Internationals ====
Three ODI centuries have been scored at the venue, two in a men's match and one in a women's match.

Men's ODI centuries on the ground
| No. | Score | Player | Team | Balls | Versus | Date | Result |
|---|---|---|---|---|---|---|---|
| 1 | 109* | Shai Hope | West Indies | 145 | Afghanistan | 11 November 2019 | West Indies won |
| 2 | 109 | Quinton de Kock | South Africa | 106 | Australia | 12 October 2023 | South Africa won |

Women's ODI centuries on the ground
| No. | Score | Player | Team | Balls | Versus | Date | Result |
|---|---|---|---|---|---|---|---|
| 1 | 132* | Lizelle Lee | South Africa | 132 | India | 12 March 2021 | South Africa won |

==== Twenty20 Internationals ====
Two T20I century has been scored at the venue.

| No. | Score | Player | Team | Balls | Versus | Date | Result |
|---|---|---|---|---|---|---|---|
| 1 | 111* | Rohit Sharma | India | 61 | West Indies | 6 November 2018 | India won |
| 2 | 102* | Shreyas Iyer | India | 43 | West Indies | 6 October 2026 | India won |

=== List of international five-wicket hauls ===
==== Test matches ====
| No. | Bowler | Date | Team | Versus | Inn | Overs | Runs | Wkts | Result |
|---|---|---|---|---|---|---|---|---|---|
| 1 | Rahkeem Cornwall | 27 November 2019 | West Indies | Afghanistan | 1 | 25.3 | 75 | 7 | West Indies won |
| 2 | Hamza Hotak | 27 November 2019 | Afghanistan | West Indies | 2 | 28.3 | 74 | 5 | West Indies won |

==== T20Is ====
| No. | Bowler | Date | Team | Versus | Inn | Overs | Runs | Wkts | Result |
|---|---|---|---|---|---|---|---|---|---|
| 1 | Karim Janat | 16 November 2019 | Afghanistan | West Indies | 2 | 4 | 11 | 5 | Afghanistan won |

== See also ==
- Saifai International Cricket Stadium
- List of Test cricket grounds
- Atal Bihari Vajpayee Stadium, Himachal Pradesh
- List of international cricket grounds in India
- Lists of stadiums
