= Sent Into Space =

English aerospace company

- Company type: Private
- Industry: Aerospace, marketing
- Founded: 18 July 2011
- Founders: Chris Rose; Alex Baker
- Headquarters: Sheffield, South Yorkshire
- Website: www.sentintospace.com

Sent Into Space is an English aerospace company that launches experimental payloads into the upper atmosphere using weather balloons for research, aerospace testing, marketing or publicity purposes. Sent Into Space has launched more than 1,000 flights into the upper stratosphere since its formation in 2011.

== History ==
The company was founded in 2011 in Sheffield, South Yorkshire, by Chris Rose and Alex Baker. The two met at the University of Sheffield, where they were pursuing doctorates in mechanical engineering. They were having a conversation at a pub when they thought it would be interesting to attach a camera to a weather balloon that was launched up to the upper atmosphere. After six months of experimenting, they launched the balloon on 17 December 2010 from Rose's backyard. They uploaded a video of their process and photos the camera took to YouTube, which went viral. As a result they started a company offering balloon launches as a professional service.

== Services ==
The company uses balloons made from biodegradable, undyed latex. They also use hydrogen as a lifting gas instead of helium as it is a renewable resource. The balloons reach 38 km (24 mi) on average, taking a few hours to reach that height. The reduction in air pressure as it climbs causes the balloon to keep expanding, reaching 10 m (33 ft) from an original 2 m (6.6 ft) until it bursts. Then, a parachute is deployed and the craft takes about an hour to reach the ground. Sent Into Space has software that predicts where it will land.

=== Scattering of cremated remains ===
Aura Flights, formerly Ascension Flights, is an offshoot of the company exclusively for scattering ashes in the atmosphere. It was launched in 2017 after the technology was first developed in 2015. It appeared on the television programme Dragons' Den, but rejected an offer from Deborah Meaden.

=== List of objects sent into the upper atmosphere ===
This is a select list of the 1,000+ objects the company has sent into the upper atmosphere.

Object	Client	Date	Motive	Notes	References
Vintage Sony Television	Kelvin Jones	24 August 2015	Footage for a music video		
Meat and potato pie	World Pie Eating Championship	15 December 2016	Promotion of the event	First pie launched into space	
6 cameras set up to be omnidirectional	BBC Earth	21 August 2017	Capture the Solar eclipse of August 21, 2017 from space	Launched from Fort Laramie, Wyoming, flight data helped in research of stratospheric gravity waves	
CRT TV	BRAC	5 September 2018	Broadcasting the words of victims of the Rohingya genocide	Launched from Bogra, Bangladesh	
Model of Rick Sanchez and Morty Smith's ship	Adult Swim	24 June 2021	Footage for the opening of the fifth season of Rick and Morty	First premiere in space	
Heinz Marz ketchup	Heinz Tomato Ketchup	8 November 2021	Celebration of launch of special edition Marz ketchup		
Model of Greg Davies' head	Ed Gamble	27 July 2022	To complete a challenge of Taskmaster: Champion of Champions II where Gamble must do something that "makes everyone go 'wow, that really is the greatest thing'"		
Cricket World Cup Trophy	International Cricket Council	27 June 2023	As part of a "trophy tour" before the 2023 Cricket World Cup		
Disco ball microphone	Seventeen	10 October 2023	Footage for the music video for "God of Music"		
