= Maharashtra Cricket Association Stadium =

International Cricket stadium in Pune, Maharashtra

- MCA Stadium; MCA International Stadium
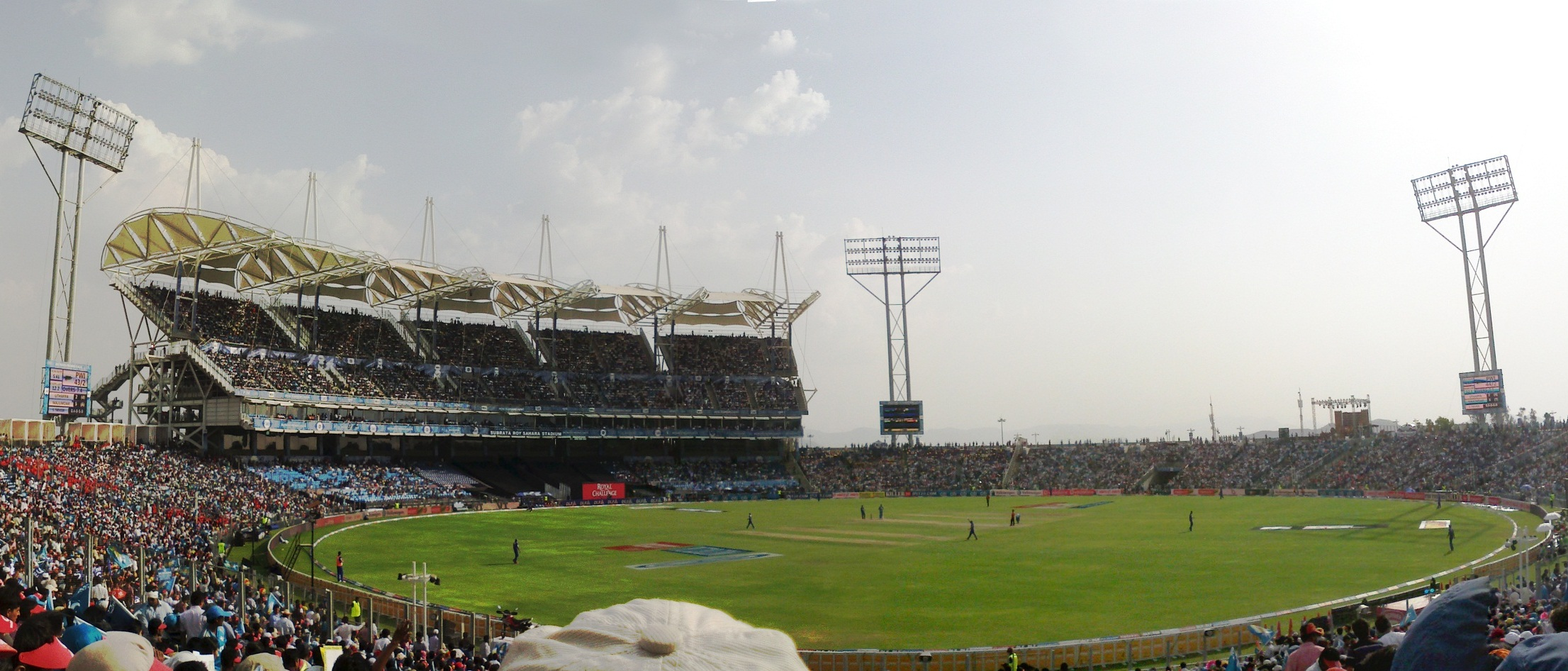
- Interactive map of Maharashtra Cricket Association Stadium

Ground information
- Location: Gahunje, Pune
- Country: India
- Coordinates: 18°40′28″N 73°42′24″E
- Home club: Maharashtra cricket team; Maharashtra women's cricket team
- Establishment: 2012
- Capacity: 42,700
- Owner: Maharashtra Cricket Association
- Architect: Michael Hopkins, Hopkins Architects
- Contractor: M/S Shapoorji Pallonji & Co. Ltd
- Operator: Maharashtra Cricket Association
- Tenants: India cricket team India women's cricket team Pune Warriors India (2012–2013); Kings XI Punjab (2015); Rising Pune Supergiant (2016–2017); Chennai Super Kings (2018)
- End names
- Pavilion End; Hill End

International information
- First men's Test: 23–25 February 2017: India v Australia
- Last men's Test: 24–28 October 2024: India v New Zealand
- First men's ODI: 13 October 2013: India v Australia
- Last men's ODI: 11 November 2023: Bangladesh v Australia
- First men's T20I: 20 December 2012: India v England
- Last men's T20I: 31 January 2025: India v England
- As of 24 October 2024; Source: Ground Info

Maharashtra Cricket Association Stadium is an international cricket stadium in Pune, Maharashtra, India. It is owned and operated by the Maharashtra Cricket Association.

It is the home ground of the Maharashtra cricket team and Maharashtra women's cricket team, and the headquarters of the Maharashtra Cricket Association (MCA). The stadium is situated on the outskirts of city limits of Pune in Gahunje village near Mumbai–Pune Expressway. It is one of the premier stadiums of the country. Before its existence, Nehru Stadium of downtown Pune was the home ground of the Maharashtra Cricket team and venue for international matches organised by MCA.

MCA stadium was designed by Michael Hopkins of Hopkins architects. Its seating capacity is 42,700. The arena's shape is like a deep bowl. The venue hosted its first international match in December 2012. Its ground's shape is round, with Bermuda grass surface. The ground has high-tech pop-up sprinklers. Its final phase of construction is yet to be completed. It has floodlights to organise games at night.

On 1 April 2012, then ICC president Sharad Pawar inaugurated the MCA stadium. The arena hosted its first first-class match in December 2011, when Himachal Pradesh played against home side Maharashtra cricket team in 2011-12 Ranji trophy edition, and hosted the first IPL game (Pune Warriors v King's XI Punjab) in April 2012. MCA stadium hosted its first T20I match in December 2012 (between India-England) and first Test in February 2017.

The arena hosted 5 games of 2023 ICC World Cup including the India–Bangladesh game.

== History ==
=== Background ===
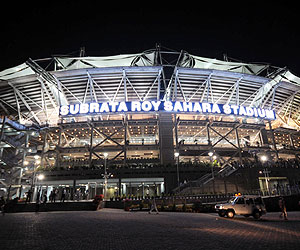
Outside view of this arena at night

The MCA's decision to build a new cricket stadium in Pune stemmed from a dispute with the Pune Municipal Corporation, regarding ticket allocations for Nehru Stadium. This conflict came to a head when an international match between India and Sri Lanka was moved to Kolkata, with the MCA stating they were in no position to host the match. Following this, the MCA decided a new stadium was needed.

=== Construction ===
The groundbreaking ceremony was performed on the construction site on 21 October 2007 by the Board of Control for Cricket in India (BCCI) president Sharad Pawar. MCA granted the contract to construct the first phase of the construction to Shapoorji Pallonji & Co. Ltd in November 2009. The construction work started on 14 November 2007. The stadium is designed by British architect Sir Michael Hopkins of Hopkins Architects, who also credited to designed Lord's mount stand and Ages bowl stadium of Southampton, England. The project's original deadline was November 2010 with cost of ₹ 1.50 billion, covering an area of 35 acres (140,000 m^{2}). The construction of the stadium was held from 2010 to 2012, it faced various problems before completion in December 2011. Although it's claimed that major part of the stadium is built, the final phase of the construction is still yet to complete, 75% stands do not have roof and final phase of building is yet to started as of September 2023. Maharashtra Cricket Association intended to host matches of 2011 World Cup, due to construction delayed, it was not able to do that.

The stadium and the seating arrangement were designed in such a way that an unobstructed view is assured from each location.The most important feature of this stadium is its rainwater drainage system. Often, matches are abandoned due to heavy downpour to overcome this problem, MCA opted for a sand-based outfield developed departmentally with technical assistance from STRI Limited, UK. Due to this technology, even during heavy showers, water on the outfield drains out fast, making it ready for play again just in few minutes.Zeolite supplied by G M Chemicals are used for Turf management.

It was inaugurated in a ceremony by the then ICC President and nation's Agriculture Minister Sharad Pawar on 1 April 2012. Maharashtra's chief minister Prithviraj Chavan, deputy CM Ajit Pawar was invited.

In 2013, the Indian company Sahara India Pariwar bought the naming rights of the stadium, by virtue it was renamed as "Subrata Roy Sahara Stadium". However, the name was changed back to the Maharashtra Cricket Association Stadium because Sahara paid only a part of the ₹ 200 crore that it had promised when acquiring the rights.

=== Began hosting games ===
Before official inauguration, the stadium hosted a Ranji trophy match between Himachal Pradesh- Maharashtra on 21 December 2011 and some practice games. In November 2015, the stadium was selected as the new Test venue of the country. It hosted its first Test match in February 2017, it was the 1st match of the four match series, Steve Smith became first batter to score a test century in the stadium, Steve O'Keefe took six wickets in each inning, Australia won by 333 runs.

In the 2010s, it served as the home ground for Pune Warriors India, Rising Pune Supergiant and Chennai Super Kings in different time.

In 2015 IPL, Kings Xi Punjab decided to move out of Mohali due to lukewarm spectator response at their primary home ground. Following the decision three home games were played at Pune. In 2018 IPL, due to members of some political parties protested outside the M. A. Chidambaram Stadium, Chennai, political parties of Chennai demanded the IPL matches to be moved out of the city until the Cauvery Management Board was set up as directed by the honourable Supreme Court of India. Additionally Chennai police expressed that they are unable to provide stadium security. Chennai Super Kings relocated its remaining games to MCA stadium.

On 28 March 2021, MCA hosted its 50th game.

== Controversy ==
In 2017, Indian TV network India Today exposed this stadium's official pitch curator Salgaonkar in a sting operation. The network alleged Salgaonkar for malpractice before India vs New Zealand ODI match of New Zealand tour of India. In response to that Mahrashtra Cricket Association sacked Salgaonkar from the job. According to 'cricket.com.au', the pitch curator showed batting pitch to the men around the Pune, which is clear breach of the ICC rule governing access to the Cricket pitch in international cricket matches. The second ODI went ahead on schedule after the pitch had been inspected by match referee Chris Broad. The India Today footage of Salgaonkar speaking with a reporter, who was posing as a bookmaker, was broadcast a few hours before the match. India Today alleged that Salgaonkar shared information about the wicket to their undercover reporter about possible scores and Salgaonkar was ready to tamper wicket for bounce. As per India Today their undercover reporter accompanied by Salgaonkar was permitted to tap, walk, and stamp on the pitch. The curator guaranteed to doctor the pitch according to demand.

Salgaonkar was suspended for 6 months from the curator position by BCCI and ICC, after that he returned on the job at MCA as curator.

In 2017, the pitch used for the first test of India vs Australia series was rated poor by ICC match referee Chris Broad in his match report.

In 2018 Bombay High court restricted Maharashtra Cricket Association (MCA) from using Pavana river water for the maintenance of this stadium's ground. The court gave this verdict in response to a Public interest litigation field by a NGO, Loksatta movement. Maharashtra government granted the permission to use the water of Pavana river for industrial purpose to MCA. The judges of Bombay High court said that, "We are shocked to note that for a period of six years, the state government has allowed the MCA to draw water from the Pavana river for industrial purposes when admittedly the MCA is not running any industry. The water is being used for the stadium" and to do so was illegal.

== Domestic cricket ==
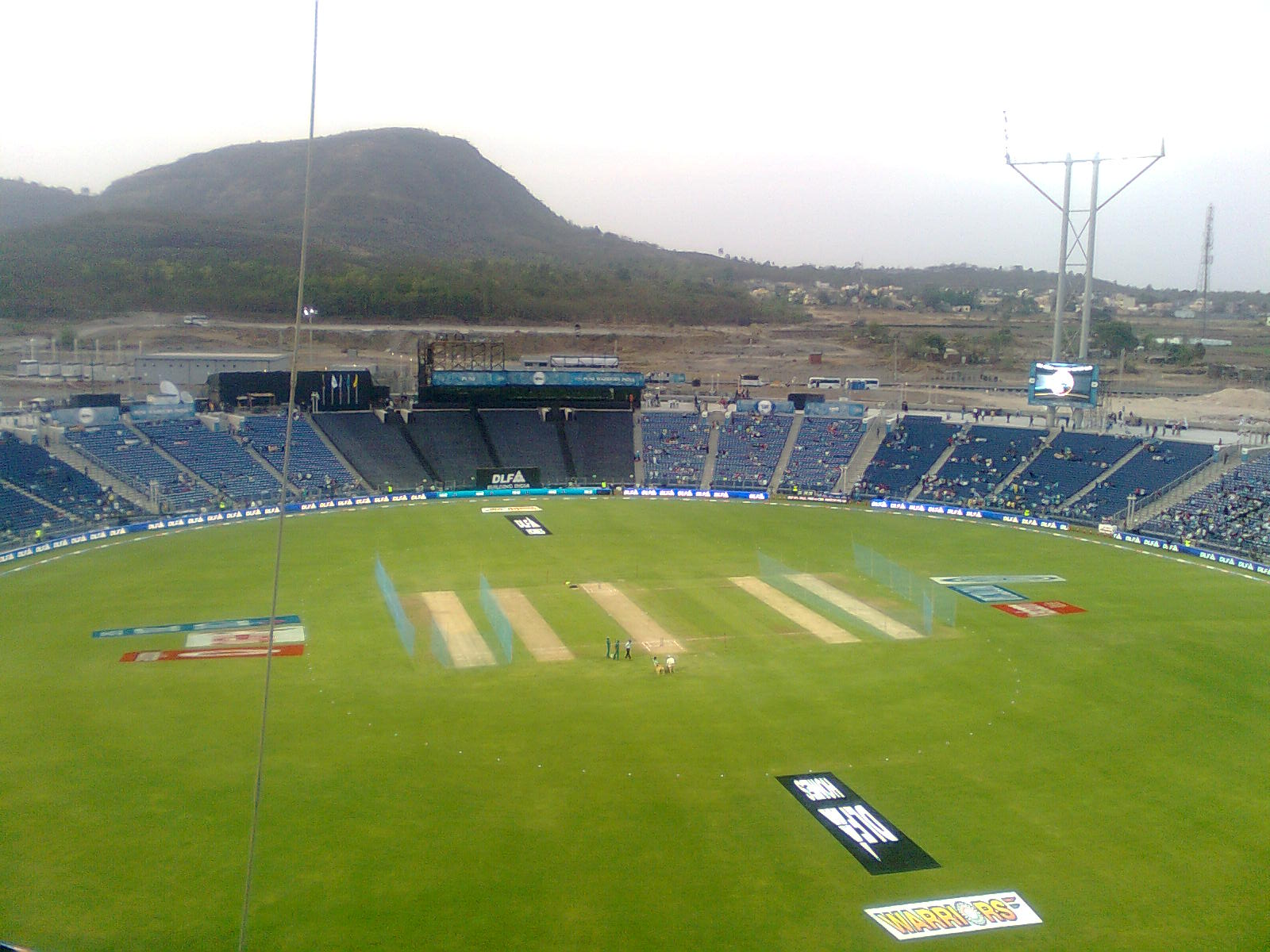
View from pavellion end.

The arena has hosted many domestic tournaments such as the Ranji trophy, IPL and Women's T20 Challenge etc. In December 2011 the MCA stadium hosted its first first class match, when Himachal Pradesh played against home team Maharashtra in the 2011-12 Ranji trophy. In 2023 it hosted the inaugural season of the Maharashtra Premier League (MPL). The league has 6 teams, Maharashtra Cricket Association organises it. In January 2016, the stadium hosted the Ranji trophy final. It hosted the first semifinal of 2017-18 Ranji between Delhi and Bengal, Delhi won the game by an innings and 26 runs. Before the venue was built, Neharu stadium in downtown pune hosted domestic tournaments. During the 1930s-1990s the Deccan Gymkhana Ground had hosted many first-class matches in the city. National Defence Academy's ground in Khadakwasala has also hosted some first class games in the city. After inauguration in 2012, MCA stadium served as the home venue of the IPL franchise Sahara Pune Warriors. The arena also was allocated as The home ground of the Chennai Super Kings during an IPL season. It was the home ground of the Rising Pune Supergiant in 2016–17. The entire edition of 2022 IPL was held in Maharashtra, and as a result the MCA stadium hosted a significant number of games of it.

== Features ==
- A main 15 wicket match ground
- Bermuda-grass surface ground, which has pop-up sprinklers. For fast drainage of water its underground is made up 3 layers that is drainage layer of gravel, blinding layers composed of washed grit-sand and rootzone layer of silica sand, zeolite, cocopeat.
- Adjacent practice ground with nets, for practice and smaller matches
- About 45,000 seats for patrons.
- A members' pavilion and a media stand
- Additional facilities for 5,000 members including squash and badminton courts, a swimming pool, spa, restaurants and bars
- 80 corporate hospitality boxes
- A state-of-the-art indoor Cricket academy with residential accommodation for youth training schemes
- Parking for almost 3,500 cars and 12,000 two-wheelers.

== ICC World Cup matches ==
The Maharashtra cricket association stadium is scheduled to host 5 matches of 2023 ICC World Cup including India–Bangladesh on 19 October. It is the first time that the arena will host the world cup. It was in contention to host 2011 WC's games but was not able to do that due to construction delays. The city of Pune has hosted a game each in 1987 and 1996 World Cup between Sri Lanka–England and Kenya–West Indies respectively at the Swargate's Nehru stadium.

=== 2023 ICC World Cup ===
19 October 2023
14:00 (D/N)
Scorecard

Bangladesh; 256/8 (50 overs)	v	India; 261/3 (41.3 overs)
Litton Das 66 (82); Ravindra Jadeja 2/38 (10 overs)		Virat Kohli 103* (97); Mehidy Hasan 2/47 (10 overs)

India won by 7 wickets
Umpires: Adrian Holdstock (SA) and Richard Kettleborough (ENG)
Player of the match: Virat Kohli

- Bangladesh won the toss and elected to bat.
- Mushfiqur Rahim scored his 1,000th run in the World Cup.
- Virat Kohli (Ind) surpassed Sachin Tendulkar to become the fastest to reach 26,000 runs in international cricket, in terms of innings (567).

30 October 2023
14:00 (D/N)
Scorecard

Sri Lanka; 241 (49.3 Overs)	v	Afghanistan; 242/3 (45.2 Overs)
Pathum Nissanka 46 (60); Fazalhaq Farooqi 4/34 (10 overs)		Azmatullah Omarzai* 73 (63); Dilshan Madushanka 2/48 (9 Overs)

Afghanistan won by 7 wickets
Umpires: Chris Gaffaney (NZ) and Richard Illingworth (ENG)
Player of the match: Fazalhaq Farooqi

- Afghanistan won the toss and elected to field.
- Rashid Khan (Afg) played in his 100th ODI.

1 November 2023
14:00 (D/N)
Scorecard

South Africa; 357/4 (50 overs)	v	New Zealand; 167 (35.3 overs)
Rassie van der Dussen 133 (118); Tim Southee 2/77 (10 overs)		Glenn Phillips 60 (50); Keshav Maharaj 4/46 (9 overs)

South Africa won by 190 runs
Umpires: Kumar Dharmasena (SL) and Ahsan Raza (Pak)
Player of the match: Rassie van der Dussen (SA)

- New Zealand won the toss and elected to field.

8 November 2023
14:00 (D/N)
Scorecard

England; 339/9 (50 overs)	v	Netherlands; 179 (37.2 overs)
Ben Stokes 108 (84); Bas de Leede 3/74 (10 overs)		Teja Nidamanuru 41* (34); Moeen Ali 3/42 (8.2 overs)

England won by 160 runs
Umpires: Ahsan Raza (Pak) and Rod Tucker (Aus)
Player of the match: Ben Stokes (Eng)

- England won the toss and elected to bat.
- Netherlands were eliminated as a result of this match.

11 November 2023
10:30
Scorecard

Bangladesh; 306/8 (50 overs)	v	Australia; 307/2 (44.4 overs)
Towhid Hridoy 74 (79); Adam Zampa 2/32 (10 overs)		Mitchell Marsh 177* (132); Taskin Ahmed 1/61 (10 overs)

Australia won by 8 wickets
Umpires: Marais Erasmus (SA) and Ahsan Raza (Pak)
Player of the match: Mitchell Marsh (Aus)

- Australia won the toss and elected to field.
- This is the first time that Australia has successfully chased down a target of 300 or above in the World Cups.

== Statistics ==
=== One Day Internationals (ODI) ===
==== Team Records (ODI) ====
As of 18 November 2023

Highest score
Score	Team	Opposition	Year
357/4	South Africa	New Zealand	2023
356/7	India	England	2017
350/7	England	India	2017
339/9	England	Netherlands	2023
337/4	England	India	2021

Lowest score
Score	Team	Opposition	Year
167	New Zealand	South Africa	2023
179	Netherlands	England	2023
230/9	New Zealand	India	2017
232	India	Australia	2013
240	India	West Indies	2018

==== Individual Records (ODI) ====
As of 18 November 2023

Most career runs
Runs	Player	Period
551 (8 Innings)	(India) Virat Kohli	2013–2023
305 (5 Innings)	(England) Ben Stokes	2017–2023
280 (7 Innings)	(India) Shikhar Dhawan	2013–2021
234 (5 Innings)	(England) Jonny Bairstow	2021–2023
219 (5 Innings)	(India) K.L. Rahul	2017–2023

Most career wickets
Wickets	Player	Period
10 (4 Innings)	(India) Jasprit Bumrah	2017–2023
10 (6 Innings)	(India) Bhuvneshwar Kumar	2013–2021
8 (4 Innings)	(India) Shardul Thakur	2021–2023
6 (3 Innings)	(India) Prasidh Krishna	2021–2021
6 (4 Innings)	(England) Ben Stokes	2017–2023

=== List of centuries ===
==== Key ====
- * denotes that the batsman was not out.
- Inns. denotes the number of the innings in the match.
- Balls denotes the number of balls faced in an innings.
- NR denotes that the number of balls was not recorded.
- Parentheses next to the player's score denotes his century number at Edgbaston.
- The column title Date refers to the date the match started.
- The column title Result refers to the player's team result

==== Test centuries ====
No.	Score	Player	Team	Balls	Inns.	Opposing team	Date	Result
1	109	Steve Smith	Australia	202	3	India	23 February 2017	Won
2	108	Mayank Agarwal	India	195	1	South Africa	10 October 2019	Won
3	254*	Virat Kohli	India	336	1	South Africa	10 October 2019	Won

==== One Day Internationals ====
No.	Score	Player	Team	Balls	Inns.	Opposing team	Date	Result
1	122	Virat Kohli	India	105	2	England	15 January 2017	Won
2	120	Kedar Jadhav	India	76	2	England	15 January 2017	Won
3	107	Virat Kohli	India	119	2	West Indies	27 October 2018	Lost
4	108	KL Rahul	India	114	1	England	26 March 2021	Lost
5	124	Jonny Bairstow	England	112	2	India	26 March 2021	Won
6	103*	Virat Kohli	India	97	2	Bangladesh	19 October 2023	Won
7	114	Quinton de Kock	South Africa	116	1	New Zealand	1 November 2023	Won
8	133	Rassie van der Dussen	South Africa	118	1	New Zealand	1 November 2023	Won
9	108	Ben Stokes	England	84	1	Netherlands	8 November 2023	Won
10	177*	Mitchell Marsh	Australia	132	2	Bangladesh	11 November 2023	Won

=== List of five wicket hauls ===
==== Tests ====
Five-wicket hauls in Men's Test matches at Maharashtra Cricket Association Stadium
No.	Bowler	Date	Team	Opposing team	Inn	Overs	Runs	Wkts	Result
1	Steve O'Keefe	23 February 2017	Australia	India	2	13.1	35	6	Australia won
2	Steve O'Keefe	23 February 2017	Australia	India	4	15	35	6	Australia won
3	Washington Sundar	24 October 2024	India	New Zealand	1	23.1	59	7	New Zealand won
4	Mitchell Santner	24 October 2024	New Zealand	India	2	19.3	53	7	New Zealand won
5	Mitchell Santner	24 October 2024	New Zealand	India	4	29	104	6	New Zealand won

== Gallery ==
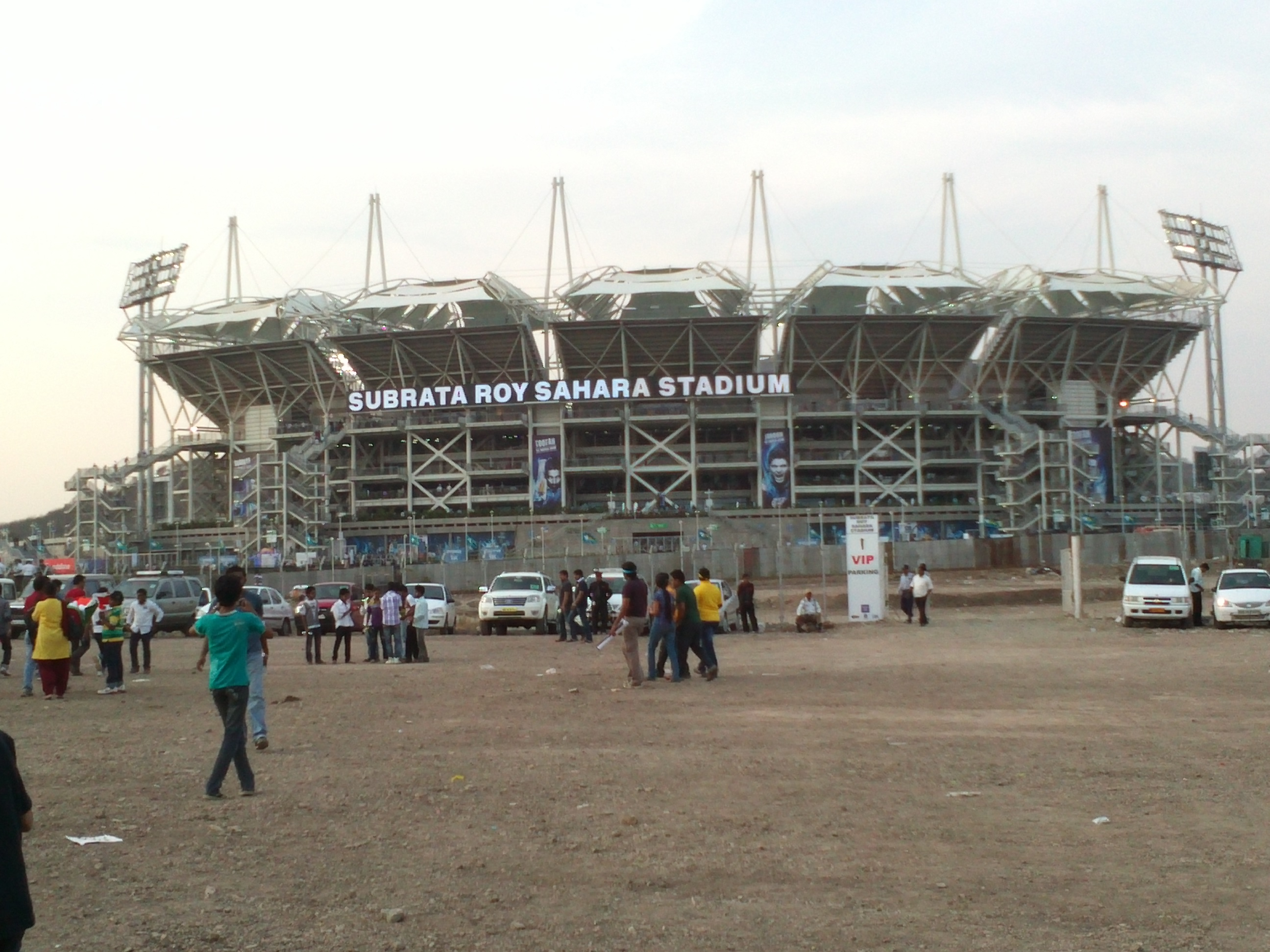
MCA stadium from outside

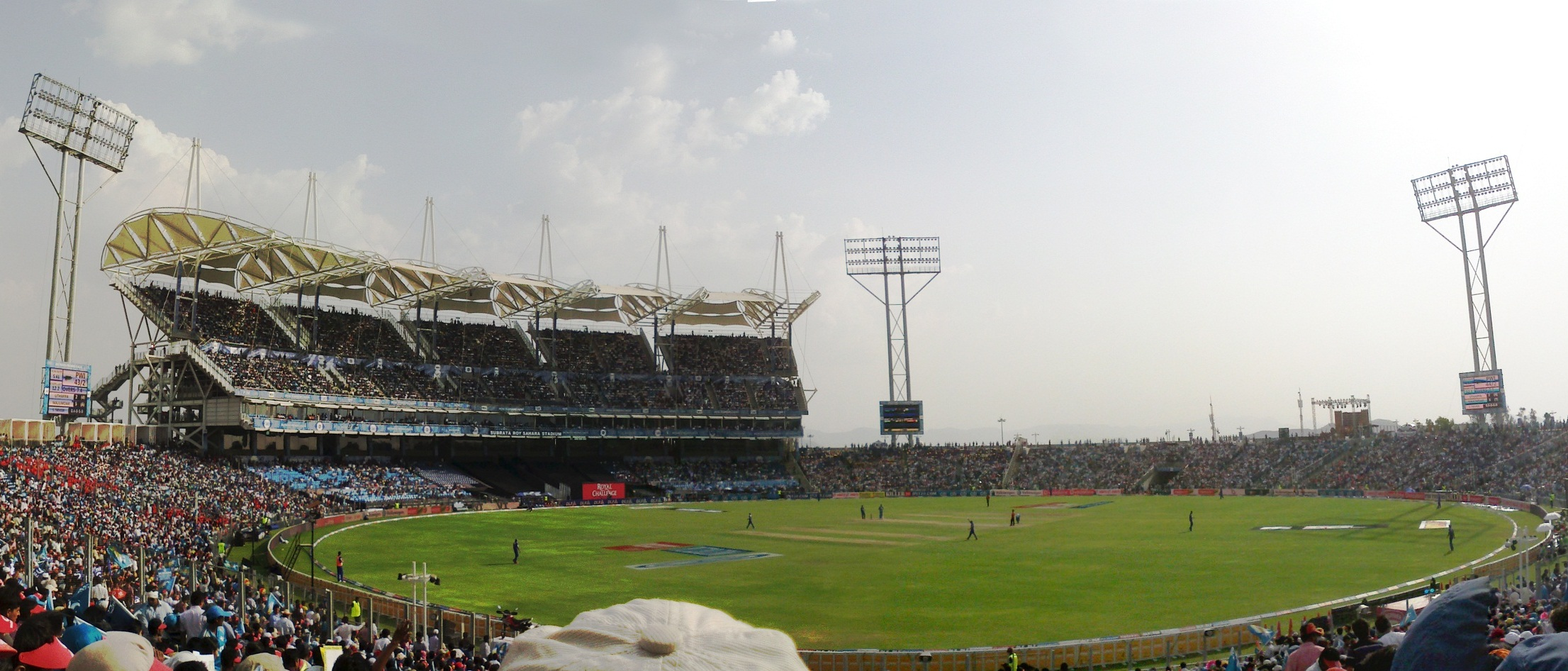
Panoramic view of the stadium

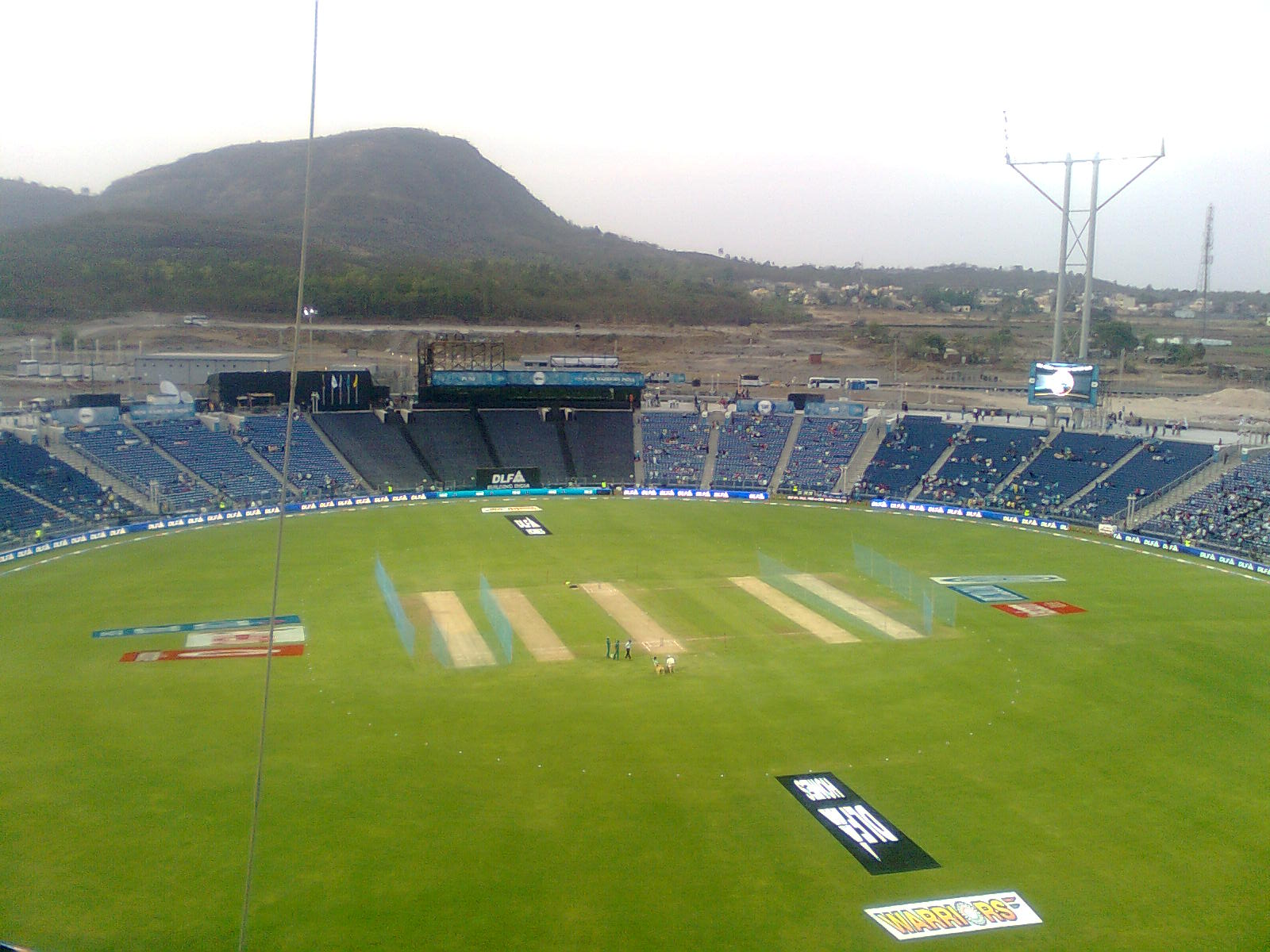
A view of stadium from South Stand

== See also ==
- Lists of stadiums
- List of stadiums in India
- Sports in Maharashtra
- Cricket in India
- Sports in India
