= God of Music (song) =

2023 single by Seventeen

- "God of Light Music" remix cover

Single by Seventeen

from the EP Seventeenth Heaven
- Language: Korean
- Released: October 23, 2023
- Genre: K-pop · funk · soul
- Length: 3:25
- Label: Pledis
- Composers: Woozi; Bumzu; Park Ki-Tae
- Lyricists: Woozi; Bumzu; S.Coups; Mingyu; Vernon

Seventeen singles chronology
"Ima (Even If the World Ends Tomorrow)" (2023)	"God of Music" (2023)	"Maestro" (2024)

Music video
- "God of Music" on YouTube

"God of Music" (Korean: 음악의 신; RR: Eumag-ui Sin) is a song by South Korean boy band Seventeen. It was released as the lead single of their eleventh extended play (EP) Seventeenth Heaven on October 23, 2023, and is the group's first song to chart at number one on the Circle Digital Chart.

== Background and release ==
On September 20, 2023, Seventeen announced their plans to release their eleventh EP Seventeenth Heaven the following month through a 30-second video of a red festival wristband. The album's tracklist was then dropped on October 15, revealing "God of Music" as its lead single. To promote the song, two music video teasers, as well as a highlight medley, were released on YouTube. The single was released alongside an accompanying music video on October 23.

A trot parody song titled "God of Light Music" was revealed on Seventeen's web variety show Going Seventeen, during a two-episode special aired on October 18 and 25. Due to fan demand, the track, along with a trot remix of "God of Music", was officially released on streaming platforms on December 26.

== Composition ==
Since the title is “God of Music,” we didn't want to send the message to a particular person but have this song go out to everybody, everyone that listens to music. We wrote the lyrics imagining that we were talking to everybody across the world, thinking about togetherness, and trying to make the lyrics as friendly and easy to listen to as possible.

— Mingyu on the song's lyrics, Teen Vogue

"God of Music" was composed by Woozi, Bumzu, and Park Ki-Tae; writing credits were also provided to Woozi, Bumzu, S.Coups, Vernon, and Mingyu. The song was described to be "a soul-inspired, funky pop track", as well as a single that "rid[es] high on euphoric brass and funk".

== Music video ==
The music video was filmed in various locations across Budapest, Hungary; this marked the first time Seventeen filmed an overseas music video in six years, since the release of their 2017 single "Don't Wanna Cry".

In partnership with Sent Into Space, a marketing company that specializes in near-space launches, Seventeen sent a disco-ball-inspired microphone into space. The item was launched using spacecraft attached to a high-altitude balloon filled with hydrogen gas, ascending to over 113,000 feet, where it was filmed for over two hours for a four-second clip on the music video.

== Commercial performance ==
"God of Music" debuted at number one on South Korea's Circle Digital Chart for the week of October 22–28, 2023, becoming Seventeen's first song to top the chart. Internationally, "God of Music" entered the World Digital Song Sales chart at number nine on the week of November 4, 2023.

== Critical reception ==
Maria Sherman of the Associated Press praised the track, describing it as both a "sunshine-y pop single with bright brassy touches" and "a life-affirming sing-along so nice they put it on the album twice". In agreement, Hwang Ji-young of JoongAng Ilbo wrote that "God of Music" was a "festival-like song that lets you feel the energy of happiness that Seventeen talks about". Commending the song's addictive nature, Lee Min-ji from Newsen identified the onomatopoeic chorus as a captivating rhythm that "will make your shoulders shake even after just hearing it once". NME's Abby Webster also commented that, despite its title, "God of Music" is an unpompous single that shows the band doing what they love most.

== Accolades ==
Music program awards for "God of Music"
Program	Date	Ref.
Show Champion	November 1, 2023	
M Countdown	November 2, 2023	
Music Bank	November 3, 2023	
Show! Music Core	November 4, 2023	
Inkigayo	November 5, 2023	

== Track listing ==
- Digital download and streaming – God of Light Music
1. "God of Light Music" – 1:31
2. "God of Music" (Trot Remix) – 2:49
3. "God of Light Music" (Inst.) – 1:31

== Charts ==
=== Weekly charts ===
Weekly chart performance for "God of Music"
Chart (2023)	Peak position
Global 200 (Billboard)	67
Hong Kong (Billboard)	19
Japan Hot 100 (Billboard)	14
Japan Combined Singles (Oricon)	12
Malaysia (Billboard)	22
Malaysia International (RIM)	14
New Zealand Hot Singles (RMNZ)	26
Singapore (RIAS)	16
South Korea (Circle)	1
Taiwan (Billboard)	4
UK Singles Downloads (Official Charts)	82
UK Singles Sales (OCC)	92
US World Digital Song Sales (Billboard)	9
Vietnam (Vietnam Hot 100)	92

=== Monthly charts ===
Monthly chart performance for "God of Music"
Chart (2023)	Position
South Korea (Circle)	19

=== Year-end charts ===
Year-end chart performance for "God of Music"
Chart (2024)	Position
South Korea (Circle)	127

== Certifications ==
Certifications for "God of Music"
Region	Certification	Certified units/sales
Streaming
Japan (RIAJ)	Gold	50,000,000^{†}
^{†} Streaming-only figures based on certification alone.

== Release history ==
Release history for "God of Music"
Region	Date	Format	Version	Label	Ref.
Various	October 23, 2023	Digital download; streaming	Original	Pledis; YG Plus	
Various	December 26, 2023	Digital download; streaming	God of Light Music	Pledis; YG Plus	
