= 2023 Cricket World Cup =

13th edition of the ICC Men's Cricket World Cup

2023 ICC Men's Cricket World Cup
- Dates: 5 October – 19 November 2023
- Administrator: International Cricket Council
- Cricket format: One Day International (ODI)
- Tournament format(s): Round-robin and knockout
- Host: India
- Champions: Australia (6th title)
- Runners-up: India
- Participants: 10
- Matches: 48
- Attendance: 1,250,307 (26,048 per match)
- Player of the series: (India) Virat Kohli
- Most runs: (India) Virat Kohli (765)
- Most wickets: (India) Mohammed Shami (24)
- Official website: cricketworldcup.com

The 2023 ICC Men's Cricket World Cup was the 13th edition of the ICC Men's Cricket World Cup, a quadrennial One Day International (ODI) cricket tournament organized by the International Cricket Council (ICC). It was hosted from 5 October to 19 November 2023 across ten venues in India. This was the fourth World Cup held in India, but the first where India was the sole host.

The tournament was contested by ten national teams, maintaining the same format used in 2019. After six weeks of round-robin matches, India, South Africa, Australia, and New Zealand finished as the top four and qualified for the knockout stage. In the knockout stage, India and Australia beat New Zealand and South Africa, respectively, to advance to the final, played on 19 November at the Narendra Modi Stadium in Ahmedabad. Australia beat India in the final by six wickets, winning their sixth Cricket World Cup title.

A total of 1,250,307 spectators attended the matches, the highest number in any Cricket World Cup to date. The tournament set viewership records in India, drawing 518 million viewers, with a peak of 59 million streaming viewers during the final, which alone recorded a record-breaking global audience of about 300 million viewers worldwide.

== Background ==
=== Host selection ===
On 11 December 2017, India was announced by the ICC as hosts of the 2023 Cricket World Cup; while India had served as a co-host during three previous tournaments (most recently in 2011, which it co-hosted with Sri Lanka and Bangladesh), it would mark the first Cricket World Cup to be hosted solely by India, and the first to be solely hosted one nation since 1979.

=== COVID-19 pandemic ===
Originally, the competition was to be played from 9 February to 26 March 2023. In July 2020, it was announced that due to the disruption of the qualification schedule by the COVID-19 pandemic, the start of the tournament would be delayed to October 2023. The ICC released the tournament schedule on 27 June 2023.

=== Format ===
This was the first ICC World Cup in which penalties for slow over-rates were given to bowling teams if they did not complete their 50 overs in the stipulated time. On-field umpires could penalise the bowling team by not allowing more than four fielders outside the 30-yard circle.

=== Pakistan's participation ===
The Pakistan Cricket Board (PCB) had threatened to boycott the tournament after the Board of Control for Cricket in India (BCCI) refused to send a team to the 2023 Asia Cup scheduled in Pakistan. This issue was resolved in June 2023 after the Asian Cricket Council announced that the tournament would be hosted using a hybrid model proposed by the PCB, with nine of the 13 matches in the competition played in Sri Lanka.

=== Prize money ===
The ICC allocated a pool of US$10 million in prize money for the tournament, with payouts remaining the same as the 2019 and 2015 tournaments. Australia, the winning team, received US$4,000,000, the runner-up $2,000,000 and the losing semi-finalists $1,600,000. Teams that did not progress past the league stage received $100,000 and the winner of each league stage match received $40,000.

=== Marketing ===
The ICC hosted a trophy tour for 100 days prior to the tournament beginning 27 June 2023, with the Cricket World Cup Trophy being taken to various locations around the world. The event began with the launching of the trophy into the stratosphere by Sent Into Space and landing at Modi Stadium—becoming the first sports trophy to have ever been sent into space. The ICC officially announced the mascots for the World Cup in August. The mascots were a male and female duo named "Tonk" and "Blaze" from the fictional cricketing utopia "Crictoverse".

Ahead of the tournament, it was reported that an opening ceremony would take place on 4 October 2023 at the Narendra Modi Stadium in Ahmedabad, a day before the opening match at the same venue. The official theme song of the 2023 Cricket World Cup titled "Dil Jashn Bole" (transl. Heart say celebrate) was released on 20 September. The song was composed by Pritam, and was sung by Pritam, Nakash Aziz, Sreerama Chandra, Amit Mishra, Jonita Gandhi, Akasa Singh and S. P. Charan. However, the song was subject to backlash and bad reviews. The opening ceremony was cancelled and replaced by a closing ceremony ahead of the final. During this a drone show was held.

== Qualification ==
Highlighted are the countries that participated in the 2023 Cricket World Cup. Qualified as host Qualified via the 2020–2023 Super League Qualified via the 2023 Qualifier Participated in the qualifier but failed to qualify

Other than India, who qualified as hosts, all teams had to qualify for the tournament through the 2023 Cricket World Cup qualification process. Afghanistan, Australia, Bangladesh, England, New Zealand, Pakistan and South Africa qualified via the ICC Cricket World Cup Super League, with the Netherlands and Sri Lanka securing the final two places via the 2023 Cricket World Cup Qualifier in Zimbabwe during June and July 2023.

As a result of the qualifying process, the competition was the first not to include former winners West Indies, who failed to progress for the first time after their defeat to Scotland. Full members Ireland and Zimbabwe also missed out on qualification, meaning three of the four full members who took part in the knock-out qualification stage did not qualify, with only Sri Lanka progressing. The final qualification spot was decided by an eliminator match between associate members Scotland and the Netherlands, with the Dutch team taking the final place.

Means of qualification	Date	Venue	Berths	Qualified
Host nation	—	—	1	India
ICC Super League	30 July 2020 – 14 May 2023	Various	7	Afghanistan; Australia; Bangladesh; England; New Zealand; Pakistan; South Africa
Qualifier	18 June 2023 – 9 July 2023	Zimbabwe	2	Sri Lanka; Netherlands
Total			10	

== Venues ==
2023 Cricket World Cup venues

The tournament took place in ten stadiums, situated in ten cities across India. The first and second semi-finals were held at Wankhede Stadium in Mumbai and Eden Gardens in Kolkata respectively, while the final took place at Narendra Modi Stadium in Ahmedabad.

The BCCI provided funding for renovations and refurbishments at stadiums. Himachal Pradesh Cricket Association Stadium received a new grass surface, drainage system, seating, and hospitality boxes. Wankhede Stadium had upgrades to the outfield, floodlights, corporate boxes, and toilets. M. A. Chidambaram Stadium installed new floodlights and relaid two wickets.

With the autumn scheduling of this World Cup, the ICC instituted protocols for reducing the impact of moisture—including dew and rain—on pitch conditions, so that they did not give the team batting second an advantage (as had frequently occurred in the 2021 Men's T20 World Cup). These included using a specific wetting agent, and the boundary set at around 70 m (77 yards) at each stadium, with more grass on the pitch to encourage seam bowling over spin bowling.

Location	Stadium	Capacity	No. of matches
Ahmedabad	Narendra Modi Stadium	132,000	5
Bangalore	M. Chinnaswamy Stadium	33,800	5
Chennai	M. A. Chidambaram Stadium	38,200	5
Delhi	Arun Jaitley Stadium	55,000	5
Dharamshala	HPCA Stadium	21,200	5
Hyderabad	Rajiv Gandhi International Cricket Stadium	39,200	3
Kolkata	Eden Gardens	68,000	5
Lucknow	BRSABV Ekana Cricket Stadium	50,100	5
Mumbai	Wankhede Stadium	33,100	5
Pune	Maharashtra Cricket Association Stadium	42,700	5

== Squads ==
All teams were asked to finalise their 15-player squads prior to 28 September, with any replacements after this date requiring approval from the ICC. All squads were announced by 26 September 2023. The oldest player of the tournament was Dutch player Wesley Barresi, who was 39 years old, while the youngest was Afghan spinner Noor Ahmad, who was 18.

== Match officials ==
Match officials for the 2023 Cricket World Cup were selected by the International Cricket Council (ICC) umpire selection panel, headed by Sean Easey, the ICC's senior manager for umpires and referees. The panel selected 12 umpires to officiate at the tournament: three from Australia, four from England, four from Asia (one each from Bangladesh, India, Pakistan and Sri Lanka), two each from New Zealand and South Africa and one from the West Indies. It also selected four match referees for the event.

== Warm-up matches ==
Warm-up matches were held from 29 September to 3 October 2023 at Rajiv Gandhi International Cricket Stadium in Hyderabad, Assam Cricket Association Stadium in Guwahati, and Greenfield International Stadium in Thiruvananthapuram.

India's warm-up fixtures were announced on 27 June. The complete warm-up fixtures were announced on 23 August. The matches were broadcast live on television.

Warm-up matches

29 September 2023
14:00
Scorecard

Sri Lanka; 263 (49.1 overs)	v	Bangladesh; 264/3 (42 overs)
Pathum Nissanka 68 (64); Mahedi Hasan 3/36 (9 overs)		Tanzid Hasan 84 (88); Lahiru Kumara 1/30 (6 overs)

Bangladesh won by 7 wickets
Assam Cricket Association Stadium, Guwahati
Umpires: Saiyed Khalid (Ind) and Vinod Seshan (Ind)

- Sri Lanka won the toss and elected to bat.

29 September 2023
14:00
Scorecard

South Africa	v	Afghanistan

Match abandoned
Greenfield International Stadium, Thiruvananthapuram
Umpires: Anil Chaudhary (Ind) and Rohan Pandit (Ind)

- No toss.
- No play was possible due to rain.

29 September 2023
14:00
Scorecard

Pakistan; 345/5 (50 overs)	v	New Zealand; 346/5 (43.4 overs)
Mohammad Rizwan 103* (94); Mitchell Santner 2/39 (8 overs)		Rachin Ravindra 97 (72); Usama Mir 2/68 (10 overs)

New Zealand won by 5 wickets
Rajiv Gandhi International Stadium, Hyderabad
Umpires: Parashar Joshi (Ind) and Akshay Totre (Ind)

- Pakistan won the toss and elected to bat.

30 September 2023
14:00
Scorecard

India	v	England

No result
Assam Cricket Association Stadium, Guwahati
Umpires: Saiyed Khalid (Ind) and Saidarshan Kumar (Ind)

- India won the toss and elected to bat.
- No play was possible due to rain.

30 September 2023
14:00
Scorecard

Australia; 166/7 (23 overs)	v	Netherlands; 84/6 (14.2 overs)
Steve Smith 55 (42); Roelof van der Merwe 2/12 (3 overs)		Colin Ackermann 31* (37); Mitchell Starc 3/18 (3 overs)

No result
Greenfield International Stadium, Thiruvananthapuram
Umpires: Rohan Pandit (Ind) and Virender Sharma (Ind)

- Australia won the toss and elected to bat.
- The match was reduced to 23 overs per side due to rain.
- Rain prevented any further play.

2 October 2023
14:00
Scorecard

Bangladesh; 188/9 (37 overs)	v	England; 197/6 (24.1 overs)
Mehidy Hasan 74 (89); Reece Topley 3/23 (5 overs)		Moeen Ali 56 (39); Mustafizur Rahman 2/23 (3 overs)

England won by 4 wickets (DLS method)
Assam Cricket Association Stadium, Guwahati
Umpires: Nitin Menon (Ind) and Sharfuddoula (Ban)

- Bangladesh won the toss and elected to bat.
- The match was reduced to 37 overs per side due to rain.
- England were set a revised target of 197 runs from 37 overs due to rain.

2 October 2023
14:00
Scorecard

New Zealand; 321/6 (50 overs)	v	South Africa; 211/4 (37 overs)
Devon Conway 78 (73); Lungi Ngidi 3/33 (7 overs)		Quinton de Kock 84* (89); Trent Boult 2/20 (5 overs)

New Zealand won by 7 runs (DLS method)
Greenfield International Stadium, Thiruvananthapuram
Umpires: Chris Gaffaney (NZ) and Richard Kettleborough (Eng)

- New Zealand won the toss and elected to bat.
- South Africa innings curtailed at 37 overs due to rain; DLS par score was 219.

3 October 2023
14:00
Scorecard

Sri Lanka; 294 (46.2 overs)	v	Afghanistan; 261/4 (38.1 overs)
Kusal Mendis 158 (87); Mohammad Nabi 4/44 (8 overs)		Rahmanullah Gurbaz 119 (92); Kasun Rajitha 1/18 (7 overs)

Afghanistan won by 6 wickets (DLS method)
Assam Cricket Association Stadium, Guwahati
Umpires: Ahsan Raza (Pak) and Joel Wilson (WI)

- Afghanistan won the toss and elected to field.
- Afghanistan were set a revised target of 257 runs from 42 overs due to rain.

3 October 2023
14:00
Scorecard

India	v	Netherlands

Match abandoned
Greenfield International Stadium, Thiruvananthapuram
Umpires: Michael Gough (Eng) and Alex Wharf (Eng)

- No toss.
- No play was possible due to rain.

3 October 2023
14:00
Scorecard

Australia; 351/7 (50 overs)	v	Pakistan; 337 (47.4 overs)
Glenn Maxwell 77 (71); Usama Mir 2/31 (5 overs)		Babar Azam 90 (59); Marnus Labuschagne 3/78 (8.4 overs)

Australia won by 14 runs
Rajiv Gandhi International Stadium, Hyderabad
Umpires: Paul Reiffel (Aus) and Rod Tucker (Aus)

- Australia won the toss and elected to bat.

== Group stage ==
The ICC announced the World Cup schedule on 27 June 2023 at an event in Mumbai with a countdown of 100 days to the opening match of the World Cup on 5 October. The group stage started with the match between the finalists of the 2019 Cricket World Cup, New Zealand and England, at Narendra Modi Stadium. On 9 August 2023, nine fixtures, including the match between India and Pakistan, were rescheduled by the ICC. The top seven teams in the tournament, excluding Pakistan who qualify automatically as host, qualified for the 2025 ICC Champions Trophy.

=== Points table ===
Pos	Team	Pld	W	L	T	NR	Pts	NRR	Qualification
1	India (H, R)	9	9	0	0	0	18	2.570	Advanced to the semi-finals and qualified for the 2025 ICC Champions Trophy
2	South Africa	9	7	2	0	0	14	1.261	Advanced to the semi-finals and qualified for the 2025 ICC Champions Trophy
3	Australia (C)	9	7	2	0	0	14	0.841	Advanced to the semi-finals and qualified for the 2025 ICC Champions Trophy
4	New Zealand	9	5	4	0	0	10	0.743	Advanced to the semi-finals and qualified for the 2025 ICC Champions Trophy
5	Pakistan	9	4	5	0	0	8	−0.199	Qualified for the 2025 ICC Champions Trophy
6	Afghanistan	9	4	5	0	0	8	−0.336	Qualified for the 2025 ICC Champions Trophy
7	England	9	3	6	0	0	6	−0.572	Qualified for the 2025 ICC Champions Trophy
8	Bangladesh	9	2	7	0	0	4	−1.087	Qualified for the 2025 ICC Champions Trophy
9	Sri Lanka	9	2	7	0	0	4	−1.419	
10	Netherlands	9	2	7	0	0	4	−1.825	

Source: ESPNcricinfo
(C) Champions; (H) Host; (R) Runners-up

=== Results ===
The ICC released the fixture details on 27 June 2023.

5 October 2023
Scorecard

England; 282/9 (50 overs)	v	New Zealand; 283/1 (36.2 overs)

New Zealand won by 9 wickets
Narendra Modi Stadium, Ahmedabad

6 October 2023
Scorecard

Pakistan; 286 (49 overs)	v	Netherlands; 205 (41 overs)

Pakistan won by 81 runs
Rajiv Gandhi International Stadium, Hyderabad

7 October 2023
Scorecard

Afghanistan; 156 (37.2 overs)	v	Bangladesh; 158/4 (34.4 overs)

Bangladesh won by 6 wickets
HPCA Stadium, Dharamshala

7 October 2023
Scorecard

South Africa; 428/5 (50 overs)	v	Sri Lanka; 326 (44.5 overs)

South Africa won by 102 runs
Arun Jaitley Stadium, Delhi

8 October 2023
Scorecard

Australia; 199 (49.3 overs)	v	India; 201/4 (41.2 overs)

India won by 6 wickets
M. A. Chidambaram Stadium, Chennai

9 October 2023
Scorecard

New Zealand; 322/7 (50 overs)	v	Netherlands; 223 (46.3 overs)

New Zealand won by 99 runs
Rajiv Gandhi International Stadium, Hyderabad

10 October 2023
Scorecard

England; 364/9 (50 overs)	v	Bangladesh; 227 (48.2 overs)

England won by 137 runs
HPCA Stadium, Dharamshala

10 October 2023
Scorecard

Sri Lanka; 344/9 (50 overs)	v	Pakistan; 345/4 (48.2 overs)

Pakistan won by 6 wickets
Rajiv Gandhi International Stadium, Hyderabad

11 October 2023
Scorecard

Afghanistan; 272/8 (50 overs)	v	India; 273/2 (35 overs)

India won by 8 wickets
Arun Jaitley Stadium, Delhi

12 October 2023
Scorecard

South Africa; 311/7 (50 overs)	v	Australia; 177 (40.5 overs)

South Africa won by 134 runs
BRSABV Ekana Cricket Stadium, Lucknow

13 October 2023
Scorecard

Bangladesh; 245/9 (50 overs)	v	New Zealand; 248/2 (42.5 overs)

New Zealand won by 8 wickets
M. A. Chidambaram Stadium, Chennai

14 October 2023
Scorecard

Pakistan; 191 (42.5 overs)	v	India; 192/3 (30.3 overs)

India won by 7 wickets
Narendra Modi Stadium, Ahmedabad

15 October 2023
Scorecard

Afghanistan; 284 (49.5 overs)	v	England; 215 (40.3 overs)

Afghanistan won by 69 runs
Arun Jaitley Stadium, Delhi

16 October 2023
Scorecard

Sri Lanka; 209 (43.3 overs)	v	Australia; 215/5 (35.2 overs)

Australia won by 5 wickets
BRSABV Ekana Cricket Stadium, Lucknow

17 October 2023
Scorecard

Netherlands; 245/8 (43 overs)	v	South Africa; 207 (42.5 overs)

Netherlands won by 38 runs
HPCA Stadium, Dharamshala

18 October 2023
Scorecard

New Zealand; 288/6 (50 overs)	v	Afghanistan; 139 (34.4 overs)

New Zealand won by 149 runs
M. A. Chidambaram Stadium, Chennai

19 October 2023
Scorecard

Bangladesh; 256/8 (50 overs)	v	India; 261/3 (41.3 overs)

India won by 7 wickets
Maharashtra Cricket Association Stadium, Pune

20 October 2023
Scorecard

Australia; 367/9 (50 overs)	v	Pakistan; 305 (45.3 overs)

Australia won by 62 runs
M. Chinnaswamy Stadium, Bangalore

21 October 2023
Scorecard

Netherlands; 262 (49.4 overs)	v	Sri Lanka; 263/5 (48.2 overs)

Sri Lanka won by 5 wickets
BRSABV Ekana Cricket Stadium, Lucknow

21 October 2023
Scorecard

South Africa; 399/7 (50 overs)	v	England; 170 (22 overs)

South Africa won by 229 runs
Wankhede Stadium, Mumbai

22 October 2023
Scorecard

New Zealand; 273 (50 overs)	v	India; 274/6 (48 overs)

India won by 4 wickets
HPCA Stadium, Dharamshala

23 October 2023
Scorecard

Pakistan; 282/7 (50 overs)	v	Afghanistan; 286/2 (49 overs)

Afghanistan won by 8 wickets
M. A. Chidambaram Stadium, Chennai

24 October 2023
Scorecard

South Africa; 382/5 (50 overs)	v	Bangladesh; 233 (46.4 overs)

South Africa won by 149 runs
Wankhede Stadium, Mumbai

25 October 2023
Scorecard

Australia; 399/8 (50 overs)	v	Netherlands; 90 (21 overs)

Australia won by 309 runs
Arun Jaitley Stadium, Delhi

26 October 2023
Scorecard

England; 156 (33.2 overs)	v	Sri Lanka; 160/2 (25.4 overs)

Sri Lanka won by 8 wickets
M. Chinnaswamy Stadium, Bangalore

27 October 2023
Scorecard

Pakistan; 270 (46.4 overs)	v	South Africa; 271/9 (47.2 overs)

South Africa won by 1 wicket
M. A. Chidambaram Stadium, Chennai

28 October 2023
Scorecard

Australia; 388 (49.2 overs)	v	New Zealand; 383/9 (50 overs)

Australia won by 5 runs
HPCA Stadium, Dharamshala

28 October 2023
Scorecard

Netherlands; 229 (50 overs)	v	Bangladesh; 142 (42.2 overs)

Netherlands won by 87 runs
Eden Gardens, Kolkata

29 October 2023
Scorecard

India; 229/9 (50 overs)	v	England; 129 (34.5 overs)

India won by 100 runs
BRSABV Ekana Cricket Stadium, Lucknow

30 October 2023
Scorecard

Sri Lanka; 241 (49.3 overs)	v	Afghanistan; 242/3 (45.2 overs)

Afghanistan won by 7 wickets
Maharashtra Cricket Association Stadium, Pune

31 October 2023
Scorecard

Bangladesh; 204 (45.1 overs)	v	Pakistan; 205/3 (32.3 overs)

Pakistan won by 7 wickets
Eden Gardens, Kolkata

1 November 2023
Scorecard

South Africa; 357/4 (50 overs)	v	New Zealand; 167 (35.3 overs)

South Africa won by 190 runs
Maharashtra Cricket Association Stadium, Pune

2 November 2023
Scorecard

India; 357/8 (50 overs)	v	Sri Lanka; 55 (19.4 overs)

India won by 302 runs
Wankhede Stadium, Mumbai

3 November 2023
Scorecard

Netherlands; 179 (46.3 overs)	v	Afghanistan; 181/3 (31.3 overs)

Afghanistan won by 7 wickets
BRSABV Ekana Cricket Stadium, Lucknow

4 November 2023
Scorecard

New Zealand; 401/6 (50 overs)	v	Pakistan; 200/1 (25.3 overs)

Pakistan won by 21 runs (DLS method)
M. Chinnaswamy Stadium, Bangalore

4 November 2023
Scorecard

Australia; 286 (49.3 overs)	v	England; 253 (48.1 overs)

Australia won by 33 runs
Narendra Modi Stadium, Ahmedabad

5 November 2023
Scorecard

India; 326/5 (50 overs)	v	South Africa; 83 (27.1 overs)

India won by 243 runs
Eden Gardens, Kolkata

6 November 2023
Scorecard

Sri Lanka; 279 (49.3 overs)	v	Bangladesh; 282/7 (41.1 overs)

Bangladesh won by 3 wickets
Arun Jaitley Stadium, Delhi

7 November 2023
Scorecard

Afghanistan; 291/5 (50 overs)	v	Australia; 293/7 (46.5 overs)

Australia won by 3 wickets
Wankhede Stadium, Mumbai

8 November 2023
Scorecard

England; 339/9 (50 overs)	v	Netherlands; 179 (37.2 overs)

England won by 160 runs
Maharashtra Cricket Association Stadium, Pune

9 November 2023
Scorecard

Sri Lanka; 171 (46.4 overs)	v	New Zealand; 172/5 (23.2 overs)

New Zealand won by 5 wickets
M. Chinnaswamy Stadium, Bangalore

10 November 2023
Scorecard

Afghanistan; 244 (50 overs)	v	South Africa; 247/5 (47.3 overs)

South Africa won by 5 wickets
Narendra Modi Stadium, Ahmedabad

11 November 2023
Scorecard

Bangladesh; 306/8 (50 overs)	v	Australia; 307/2 (44.4 overs)

Australia won by 8 wickets
Maharashtra Cricket Association Stadium, Pune

11 November 2023
Scorecard

England; 337/9 (50 overs)	v	Pakistan; 244 (43.3 overs)

England won by 93 runs
Eden Gardens, Kolkata

12 November 2023
Scorecard

India; 410/4 (50 overs)	v	Netherlands; 250 (47.5 overs)

India won by 160 runs
M. Chinnaswamy Stadium, Bangalore

== Knockout stage ==
The host India was the first team to qualify for the semi-finals after their 302-run win against Sri Lanka, their seventh successive win in the World Cup. India secured the top place amongst the semi-finalists after they beat South Africa by 243 runs on 5 November at Eden Gardens in Kolkata.

South Africa became the second team to qualify for the semi-finals after Pakistan defeated New Zealand on 4 November, with Australia becoming the third team to qualify after defeating Afghanistan on 7 November. New Zealand confirmed their berth as the fourth team after Pakistan lost their final match against England. All knockout matches had a reserve day.

=== Bracket ===
Semi-finals
1	India	397/4 (50 overs)
4	New Zealand	327 (48.5 overs)
2	South Africa	212 (49.4 overs)
3	Australia	215/7 (47.2 overs)

Final
SFW1	India	240 (50 overs)
SFW2	Australia	241/4 (43 overs)

=== Semi-finals ===
==== Semi-final 1 ====
15 November 2023
14:00 (D/N)
Scorecard

India; 397/4 (50 overs)	v	New Zealand; 327 (48.5 overs)
Virat Kohli 117 (113); Tim Southee 3/100 (10 overs)		Daryl Mitchell 134 (119); Mohammed Shami 7/57 (9.5 overs)

India won by 70 runs
Wankhede Stadium, Mumbai
Umpires: Richard Illingworth (Eng) and Rod Tucker (Aus)
Player of the match: Mohammed Shami (Ind)

- India won the toss and elected to bat.
- Mohammed Shami and Kuldeep Yadav (Ind) both played their 100th ODI.
- Mohammed Shami's 7/57 were the best bowling figures for India in ODIs, surpassing Stuart Binny's 6/4; in World Cups, surpassing Ashish Nehra's 6/23 in 2003; and in ODIs vs New Zealand, surpassing Amit Mishra's 5/18. He also surpassed Mitchell Starc to become the quickest to reach 50 wickets in World Cups, in terms of innings (17).
- Virat Kohli (Ind) broke Sachin Tendulkar's records of 49 and 673 for the most centuries in ODIs (50) and most runs in a single edition of the World Cup respectively (711) and Greg Chappell's record of 686 runs for most runs in a series.
- Virat Kohli surpassed Ricky Ponting to become the 3rd highest run scorer ever in ODIs.
- India overtook New Zealand's 393 in 2015 for the highest total in a World Cup knockout stage match (397).
- As a result of this match, India qualified for the finals of the World Cup for the fourth time, after 1983, 2003, and 2011.
- Trent Boult & Tim Southee (NZ) played in his last ODI.

==== Semi-final 2 ====
16 November 2023
14:00 (D/N)
Scorecard

South Africa; 212 (49.4 overs)	v	Australia; 215/7 (47.2 overs)
David Miller 101 (116); Mitchell Starc 3/34 (10 overs)		Travis Head 62 (48); Tabraiz Shamsi 2/42 (10 overs)

Australia won by 3 wickets
Eden Gardens, Kolkata
Umpires: Richard Kettleborough (Eng) and Nitin Menon (Ind)
Player of the match: Travis Head (Aus)

- South Africa won the toss and elected to bat.
- David Miller (SA) became the first South African to score a century in a World Cup knockout match.
- As a result, Australia qualified for the finals of the World Cup for the eighth time after 1975, 1987, 1996, 1999, 2003, 2007 and 2015.

=== Final ===
19 November 2023
14:00 (D/N)
Scorecard

India; 240 (50 overs)	v	Australia; 241/4 (43 overs)
KL Rahul 66 (107); Mitchell Starc 3/55 (10 overs)		Travis Head 137 (120); Jasprit Bumrah 2/43 (9 overs)

Australia won by 6 wickets
Narendra Modi Stadium, Ahmedabad
Umpires: Richard Illingworth (Eng) and Richard Kettleborough (Eng)
Player of the match: Travis Head (Aus)

- Australia won the toss and elected to bowl.
- David Warner (Aus) played in his last ODI match.
- Australia won their record sixth World Cup title.

== Statistics ==
=== Most runs ===
Runs	Player	Team
765	Virat Kohli	India
597	Rohit Sharma	India
594	Quinton de Kock	South Africa
578	Rachin Ravindra	New Zealand
552	Daryl Mitchell	New Zealand

- Source: ESPNcricinfo

=== Most wickets ===
Wickets	Player	Team
24	Mohammed Shami	India
23	Adam Zampa	Australia
21	Dilshan Madushanka	Sri Lanka
20	Jasprit Bumrah	India
20	Gerald Coetzee	South Africa

- Source: ESPNcricinfo

=== Team of the tournament ===
The ICC announced its team of the tournament on 21 November 2023, with Virat Kohli being named as player of the tournament, and Rohit Sharma as captain of the team.

Player	Role
(South Africa) Quinton de Kock	Opening batter/wicket-keeper
(India) Rohit Sharma	Opening batter/captain
(India) Virat Kohli	Batter
(New Zealand) Daryl Mitchell	All-rounder
(India) KL Rahul	Batter
(Australia) Glenn Maxwell	All-rounder
(India) Ravindra Jadeja	All-rounder
(India) Jasprit Bumrah	Bowler
(Sri Lanka) Dilshan Madushanka	Bowler
(Australia) Adam Zampa	Bowler
(India) Mohammed Shami	Bowler
(South Africa) Gerald Coetzee	12th man

== Broadcasting ==
Disney Star served as host broadcaster of the tournament in association with ICC TV; in India, all matches were televised by Star Sports and streamed by Disney+ Hotstar, with coverage available in English and eight regional languages. Amid competition with JioCinema for domestic cricket rights, Disney announced that all matches would be available on Disney+ Hotstar for free on mobile devices. The broadcasts featured expanded player and Hawk-Eye ball tracking features (building upon those introduced in the 2022 men's T20 World Cup) for visualizing shots and fielding, and dedicated vertical video feeds of each match designed for streaming on smartphones. Commentary on the ICC's English-language world feed was led by Ricky Ponting and Eoin Morgan among others.

The ICC projected that global live viewing minutes of the tournament had increased by 17% over 2019. In India, Broadcast Audience Research Council (BARC) ratings reported that the tournament was seen on linear television by 518 million people in India, and Disney reported that streams peaked at 59 million concurrent viewers on Hotstar—both setting new records.

== See also ==
- List of Cricket World Cup finals
