= Marais Erasmus =

South African cricket umpire (born 1964)

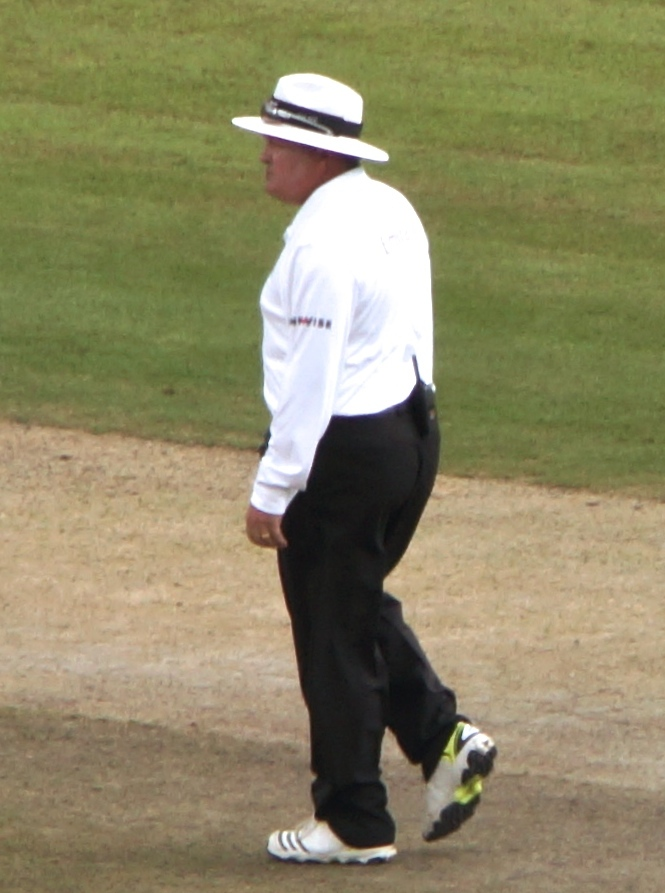
- Erasmus umpiring in England (2014)

Personal information
- Full name: Marais Erasmus
- Born: 27 February 1964 (age 62); George, Cape Province, South Africa
- Batting: Right-handed
- Bowling: Right-arm fast-medium
- Role: All-rounder, umpire

Domestic team information
- Years: Team
- 1988/89–1996/97: Boland
- FC debut: 8 December 1988 Boland v South African Defence Force
- Last FC: 12 December 1997 Boland v Natal
- LA debut: 24 October 1989 Boland v Border
- Last LA: 25 October 1996 Boland v Western Province

Umpiring information
- Tests umpired: 80 (2010–2024)
- ODIs umpired: 124 (2007–2024)
- T20Is umpired: 43 (2006–2022)
- WT20Is umpired: 18 (2010–2014)

Career statistics
Competition	FC	LA
Matches	53	54
Runs scored	1,913	322
Batting average	29.43	10.38
100s/50s	1/7	0/1
Top score	103*	55
Balls bowled	8,402	2,650
Wickets	131	48
Bowling average	28.18	37.06
5 wickets in innings	7	0
10 wickets in match	0	0
Best bowling	6/22	3/25
Catches/stumpings	35/—	16/—
- Source: Cricinfo, 24 November 2023

Marais Erasmus (born 27 February 1964) is a South African former first-class cricketer who is currently serving as an international cricket umpire. He was a member of the Elite Panel of ICC Umpires and stands in matches in all three formats of international cricket – Test matches, One Day Internationals (ODIs), and Twenty20 Internationals (T20Is).

== Playing career ==
Erasmus played first-class cricket for Boland cricket team from 1988/89 to 1996/97 as a fast-medium bowler and a lower-order batsman. His highest score of 103 not out came while batting at number seven in the second innings, after scoring 51 not out in the first innings, against the visiting Warwickshire cricket team in the 1991/92 season. His best bowling figures of 6/22 came against the touring New Zealand cricket team in the 1994/95 season. However, the match had to be abandoned early on the second day, because of a dangerous pitch at Boland Bank Park.

== Umpiring career ==
Erasmus began umpiring in first-class cricket in South Africa in the 2002/03 season. He stood in his first international match, a T20I fixture between South Africa and Australia, at the New Wanderers Stadium in Johannesburg on 24 February 2006. He made his debut as an ODI umpire in the match between Kenya and Canada at the Gymkhana Club Ground in Nairobi on 18 October 2007. He was appointed to the International Panel of ICC Umpires in an on-field capacity in 2008.

Erasmus stood in the first ICC tournament final of his career when he umpired the 2009 ICC Cricket World Cup Qualifier Final between Canada and Ireland at the Centurion Park in Centurion on 19 April 2009. Erasmus made his debut as an umpire in Tests when he took the field for the match between Bangladesh and India at the Zohur Ahmed Chowdhury Stadium in Chittagong from 17 to 21 January 2010. He was subsequently promoted to the Elite Panel of ICC Umpires in 2010 where he replaced the retiring Rudi Koertzen.

Erasmus was one of eighteen umpires who stood in matches during the 2011 ICC Cricket World Cup, hosted by India, Sri Lanka and Bangladesh. He made his umpiring debut in the Cricket World Cup match between Kenya and New Zealand at Chennai on 20 February 2011. Erasmus went on to stand in the quarter-final between the hosts, India, and Australia, at the Sardar Patel Stadium in Ahmedabad on 24 March 2011.

Erasmus was included in the panel of twenty umpires selected for officiating in matches during the 2015 ICC Cricket World Cup, hosted by Australia and New Zealand. He stood in the opening match between New Zealand and Sri Lanka at the Hagley Oval in Christchurch on 14 February 2015. Erasmus went on to stand in the quarter-final between the hosts, Australia, and Pakistan, at the Adelaide Oval on 20 March 2015. He was also the TV umpire for the 2015 ICC Cricket World Cup Final in Melbourne on 29 March 2015.

In December 2016, Erasmus won the David Shepherd Trophy for the ICC Umpire of the Year. He was the fifth umpire overall and the first South African to win the award in its history. During the 2017 ICC Champions Trophy held in England and Wales, he stood in the semi-final between the hosts, England, and Pakistan, at Sophia Gardens in Cardiff on 14 June 2017. Erasmus went on to stand in the 2017 ICC Champions Trophy Final between arch-rivals India and Pakistan at The Oval in London on 18 June 2017.

Erasmus stood in his 100th first-class match when he umpired the Test between England and the West Indies at Lord's in London from 7–11 September 2017. He was named ICC Umpire of the Year for 2017, and was awarded the David Shepherd Trophy for the second consecutive year. Erasmus stood in the 50th Test of his career when he took the field for the match between England and India at Lord's in London from 9–13 August 2018.

In April 2019, he was named as one of the sixteen umpires to stand in matches during the 2019 Cricket World Cup. In July 2019, he was named as one of the two on-field umpires for the second semi-final match, between Australia and England. Later the same month, he was also named as one of the two on-field umpires for the Cricket World Cup Final.

In January 2022, in the opening fixture between South Africa and India, Erasmus officiated in his 100th ODI as an on-field umpire. Later the same month, Erasmus was named the ICC Umpire of the Year for 2021.

In September 2023, Erasmus was named as one of sixteen umpires to officiate in the 2023 Cricket World Cup. In the match between Sri Lanka and Bangladesh, he gave Sri Lankan batter Angelo Mathews out timed out after an appeal from Bangladesh, the first such dismissal in the history of international cricket. Mathews had already been warned about being at risk of being timed out prior to the dismissal.

In February 2024, Erasmus expressed to quit umpiring matches in international cricket after the first Test between New Zealand and Australia, though wished to continue umpiring matches in domestic cricket of South Africa.

In March 2024, he retired from the Elite Panel of ICC Umpires after the second and final Test between New Zealand and Australia.

== See also ==
- List of Test cricket umpires
- List of One Day International cricket umpires
- List of Twenty20 International cricket umpires
