= Joel Wilson (umpire) =

Cricket umpire (born 1966)

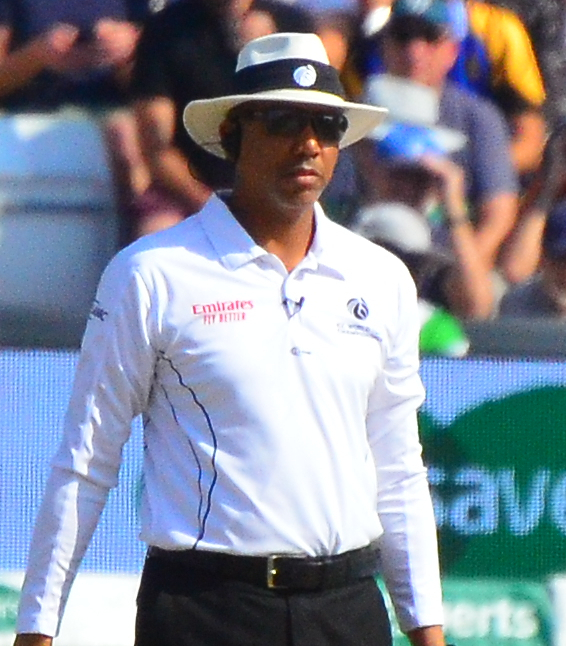
- Wilson umpiring during the 2019 Ashes

Personal information
- Full name: Joel Sheldon Wilson
- Born: 30 December 1966 (age 59); Siparia, Trinidad, Trinidad and Tobago
- Role: Umpire

Umpiring information
- Tests umpired: 47 (2015–2025)
- ODIs umpired: 98 (2011–2025)
- T20Is umpired: 50 (2012–2024)
- WODIs umpired: 13 (2014–2022)
- WT20Is umpired: 16 (2012–2021)
- Source: Cricinfo, 23 November 2023

Joel Sheldon Wilson (born 30 December 1966) is a Trinidadian international cricket umpire from Trinidad and Tobago. Wilson is a former member of the Elite Panel of ICC Umpires, who represented the West Indies. He stands in matches of all the three formats of international cricket – Tests, One Day Internationals (ODIs) and Twenty20 Internationals (T20Is).

== Umpiring career ==
Wilson was one of the twenty umpires during the 2015 Cricket World Cup hosted by Australia and New Zealand. He served as an on-field umpire in three matches in Australia during the tournament. A few months later, Wilson stood in his first Test match as an umpire when Bangladesh and South Africa played at Chittagong from 21–25 July 2015.

In April 2019, he was named as one of the sixteen umpires to stand in matches during the 2019 Cricket World Cup. In July 2019, Wilson was promoted to the Elite Panel of ICC Umpires following the retirement of Ian Gould and the exclusion of Sundaram Ravi.

In September 2023, he was named as one of the sixteen match officials for 2023 Cricket World Cup.

== See also ==
- List of Test cricket umpires
- List of ODI cricket umpires
- List of T20I cricket umpires
