= 2015 Cricket World Cup Pool B =

Cricket world cup

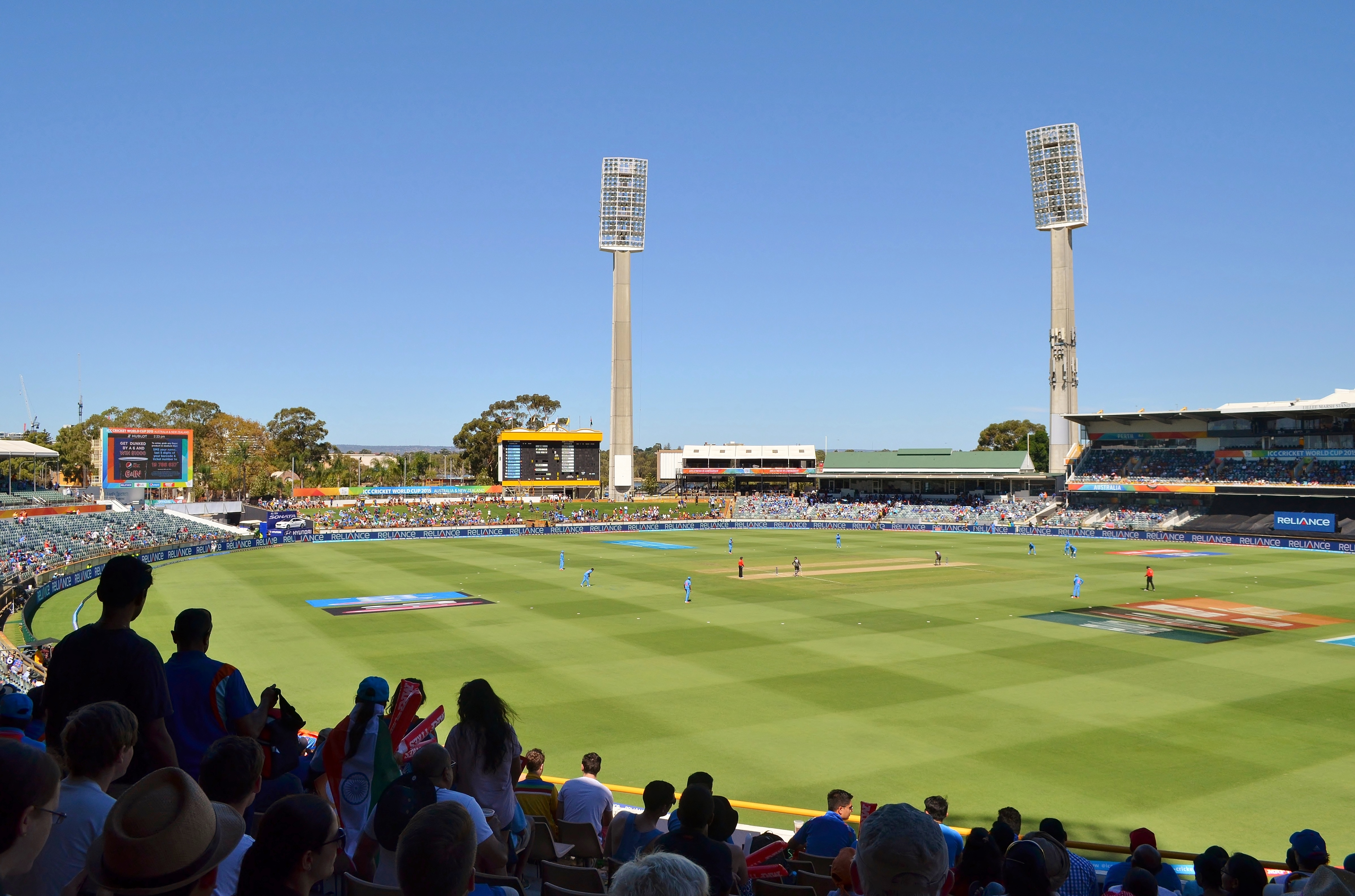
India v United Arab Emirates, WACA Ground, Perth, 28 February 2015

Pool B of the 2015 Cricket World Cup took place from 15 February to 15 March 2015. The group consisted of India, Pakistan, United Arab Emirates, Ireland, Zimbabwe, West Indies and South Africa. This phase of the tournament was played as a full round-robin amongst all seven teams, with India, South Africa, Pakistan and West Indies advancing to the quarter-finals. India remained unbeaten in this Group.

== Standings ==
Pos	Team	Pld	W	L	T	NR	Pts	NRR
1	India	6	6	0	0	0	12	1.827
2	South Africa	6	4	2	0	0	8	1.707
3	Pakistan	6	4	2	0	0	8	−0.085
4	West Indies	6	3	3	0	0	6	−0.053
5	Ireland	6	3	3	0	0	6	−0.933
6	Zimbabwe	6	1	5	0	0	2	−0.527
7	United Arab Emirates	6	0	6	0	0	0	−2.032

Source: ESPNcricinfo
- Advanced to knockout stage.

== Matches ==
=== South Africa vs Zimbabwe ===
15 February
14:00 (NZDT) (D/N)
Scorecard

South Africa; 339/4 (50 overs)	v	Zimbabwe; 277 (48.2 overs)
David Miller 138* (92); Tafadzwa Kamungozi 1/34 (8 overs)		Hamilton Masakadza 80 (74); Imran Tahir 3/36 (10 overs)

South Africa won by 62 runs
Seddon Park, Hamilton
Umpires: Rod Tucker (Aus) and Ranmore Martinesz (SL)
Player of the match: David Miller (SA)

- Zimbabwe won the toss and elected to field.
- The unbroken partnership of 256 runs by David Miller and JP Duminy was the highest fifth-wicket stand in ODI history.

=== India vs Pakistan ===
15 February
14:00 (ACDT) (D/N)
Scorecard

India; 300/7 (50 overs)	v	Pakistan; 224 (47 overs)
Virat Kohli 107 (126); Sohail Khan 5/55 (10 overs)		Misbah-ul-Haq 76 (84); Mohammed Shami 4/35 (9 overs)

India won by 76 runs
Adelaide Oval, Adelaide
Umpires: Richard Kettleborough (Eng) and Ian Gould (Eng)
Player of the match: Virat Kohli (Ind)

- India Won the toss and elected to bat first.

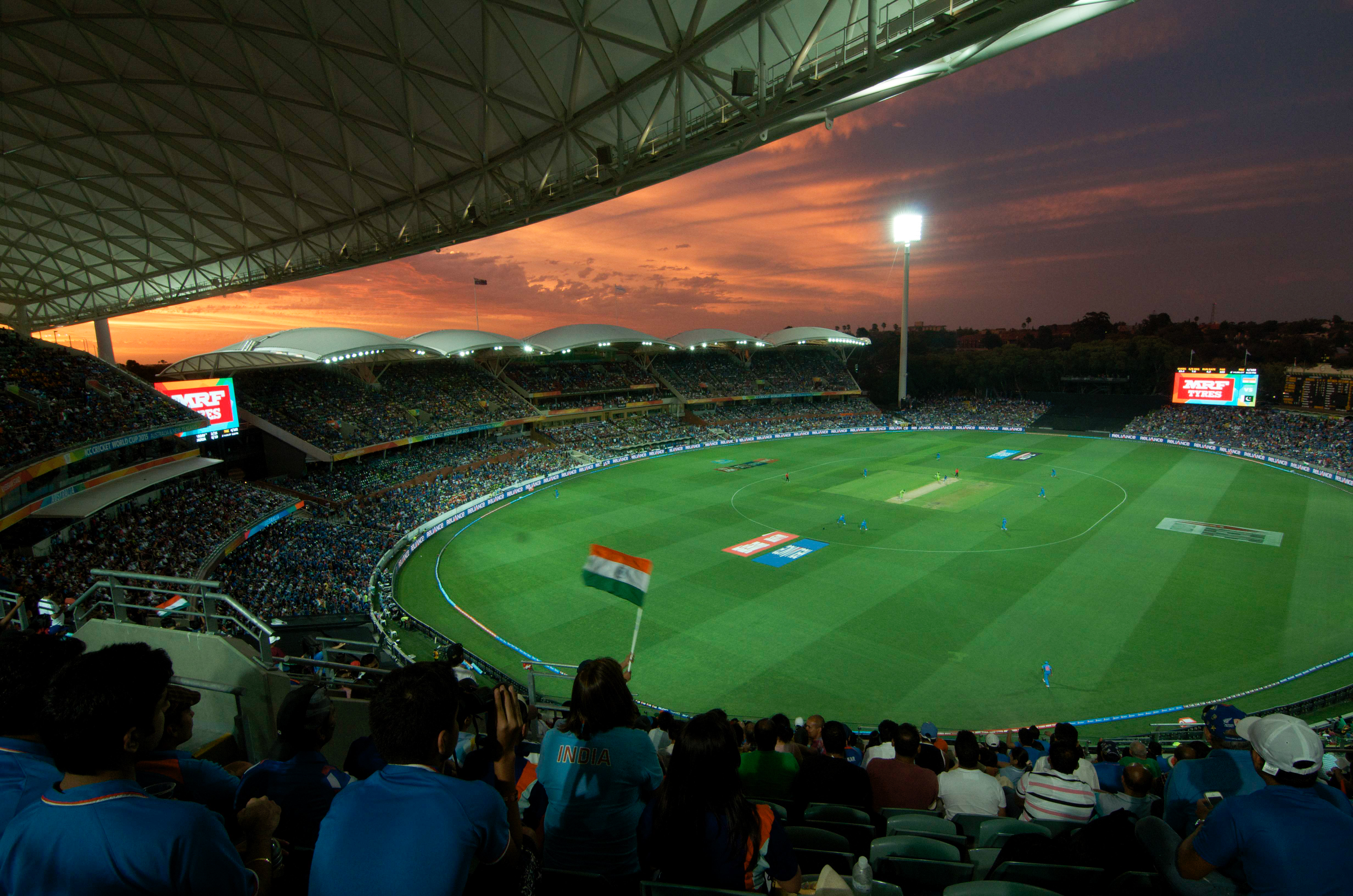
Panoramic view of the 2015 Cricket World Cup match between India and Pakistan

India won the toss and elected to bat. After losing Rohit Sharma (15) in the 8th over, Shikhar Dhawan (73) and Virat Kohli (107) put on a 129 run partnership for the 2nd wicket. After Shikhar Dhawan was run out in the 30th over, Suresh Raina joined Kohli in the middle and put on 110 for the 3rd wicket. India lost five wickets in the last five overs for 27 runs and finished with 300 runs in 50 overs. Sohail Khan was the pick of Pakistani Bowlers with 5/55 from his 10 overs. Pakistan lost Younis Khan in the 4th over to Mohammed Shami and also lost their next 4 wickets in less than 25 overs. Pakistan Captain Misbah-ul-Haq achieved 76 (84) but Shami took 3 wickets in his 2nd spell and Pakistan lost the match in the 46th over. Virat Kohli was named Man of the Match for his century.

=== Ireland vs West Indies ===
16 February
11:00 (NZDT)
Scorecard

West Indies; 304/7 (50 overs)	v	Ireland; 307/6 (45.5 overs)
Lendl Simmons 102 (84); George Dockrell 3/50 (10 overs)		Paul Stirling 92 (84); Jerome Taylor 3/71 (8.5 overs)

Ireland won by 4 wickets
Saxton Oval, Nelson
Umpires: Richard Illingworth (Eng) and Bruce Oxenford (Aus)
Player of the match: Paul Stirling (Ire)

- Ireland won the toss and elected to field.

The West Indies were put into bat by Ireland, who reduced them to 31/2 and 87/5 before Lendl Simmons and Darren Sammy shared a 154 run partnership. They finished their 50 overs with a score of 304/7. In reply, Ireland made 71 runs before losing their first wicket. Paul Stirling and Ed Joyce made a partnership of 106, before Stirling was dismissed. Niall O'Brien finished 79* from 60 balls, to get Ireland over the line with more than four overs remaining. This was Ireland's fourth World Cup victory over a Test playing side and their third successful chase of 300 or more runs in a World Cup.

=== United Arab Emirates vs Zimbabwe ===
19 February
11:00 (NZDT)
Scorecard

United Arab Emirates; 285/7 (50 overs)	v	Zimbabwe; 286/6 (48 overs)
Shaiman Anwar 67 (50); Tendai Chatara 3/42 (10 overs)		Sean Williams 76* (65); Mohammad Tauqir 2/51 (9 overs)

Zimbabwe won by 4 wickets
Saxton Oval, Nelson
Umpires: Johan Cloete (SA) and Chris Gaffaney (NZ)
Player of the match: Sean Williams (Zim)

- Zimbabwe won the toss and elected to field.
- The United Arab Emirates posted their highest ever ODI innings total.

=== Pakistan vs West Indies ===
21 February
11:00 (NZDT)
Scorecard

West Indies; 310/6 (50 overs)	v	Pakistan; 160 (39 overs)
Denesh Ramdin 51 (43); Haris Sohail 2/62 (9 overs)		Umar Akmal 59 (71); Jerome Taylor 3/15 (7 overs)

West Indies won by 150 runs
Hagley Oval, Christchurch
Umpires: Marais Erasmus (SA) and Nigel Llong (Eng)
Player of the match: Andre Russell (WI)

- Pakistan won the toss and elected to field.
- Pakistan recorded the worst start to an innings in an ODI, losing four wickets for only one run.
- This was the West Indies' biggest margin of victory over Pakistan by runs in an ODI.

=== India vs South Africa ===
22 February
14:30 (AEDT) (D/N)
Scorecard

India; 307/7 (50 overs)	v	South Africa; 177 (40.2 overs)
Shikhar Dhawan 137 (146); Morne Morkel 2/59 (10 overs)		Faf du Plessis 55 (71); Ravichandran Ashwin 3/41 (10 overs)

India won by 130 runs
Melbourne Cricket Ground, Melbourne
Umpires: Aleem Dar (Pak) and Richard Kettleborough (Eng)
Player of the match: Shikhar Dhawan (Ind)

- India won the toss and elected to bat first.
- This was the first time India defeated South Africa in a World Cup match.
- South Africa captain AB de Villiers was fined 20% of his match fee for a slow over rate. The other South African players were fined 10% of their match fee.

India got to 307 runs in 50 overs via Dhawan's highest score in ODIs. South Africa kept losing wickets at regular intervals and lost the match by 130 runs. Dhawan was named Man of the Match for his century and two catches.

=== West Indies vs Zimbabwe ===
24 February
14:30 (AEDT) (D/N)
Scorecard

West Indies; 372/2 (50 overs)	v	Zimbabwe; 289 (44.3 overs)
Chris Gayle 215 (147); Hamilton Masakadza 1/39 (6.2 overs)		Sean Williams 76 (61); Jason Holder 3/48 (7 overs)

West Indies won by 73 runs (D/L method)
Manuka Oval, Canberra
Umpires: Steve Davis (Aus) and Ian Gould (Eng)
Player of the match: Chris Gayle (WI)

- West Indies won the toss and elected to bat first.
- Zimbabwe's target was reduced to 363 from 48 overs due to rain.
- Chris Gayle surpassed 9,000 runs in ODIs, becoming only the second player from the West Indies after Brian Lara to do so. Gayle became the first batsman to score a double century in a World Cup match and the first ever non-Indian batsman to score an ODI double century. Gayle's double century was also the fastest double century in ODI cricket. Gayle's 16 sixes in his innings equalled the ODI record jointly held by Rohit Sharma and AB de Villiers.
- Gayle's 372-run partnership with Marlon Samuels is the highest for any wicket in ODI history.

=== Ireland vs United Arab Emirates ===
25 February
13:30 (AEST) (D/N)
Scorecard

United Arab Emirates; 278/9 (50 overs)	v	Ireland; 279/8 (49.2 overs)
Shaiman Anwar 106 (83); Paul Stirling 2/27 (10 overs)		Gary Wilson 80 (69); Amjad Javed 3/53 (9 overs)

Ireland won by 2 wickets
Brisbane Cricket Ground, Brisbane
Umpires: Michael Gough (Eng) and Nigel Llong (Eng)
Player of the match: Gary Wilson (Ire)

- Ireland won the toss and elected to field.
- Shaiman Anwar became the first UAE player to score a century in a World Cup game.
- The 107-run partnership between Shaiman Anwar and Amjad Javed was the highest seventh-wicket partnership in World Cup history.

=== South Africa vs West Indies ===
27 February
14:30 (AEDT) (D/N)
Scorecard

South Africa; 408/5 (50 overs)	v	West Indies; 151 (33.1 overs)
AB de Villiers 162* (66); Chris Gayle 2/21 (4 overs)		Jason Holder 56 (48); Imran Tahir 5/45 (10 overs)

South Africa won by 257 runs
Sydney Cricket Ground, Sydney
Umpires: Steve Davis (Aus) and Ian Gould (Eng)
Player of the match: AB de Villiers (SA)

- South Africa won the toss and elected to bat.
- AB de Villiers (SA) scored the fastest ODI 150 in history (64 balls), and the second fastest World Cup century. His 73 runs in the last five overs was also the most by any batsman in this period.
- Jason Holder (WI) conceded the most runs by any bowler in a World Cup match (104), and the most in any 2 consecutive overs in all ODIs.
- South Africa's score of 408/5 was the highest score in any ODI in Australia, and the second highest World Cup score.
- South Africa's 257 run victory was the joint-biggest by runs in a World Cup match, equaling India's defeat of Bermuda in 2007.

=== India vs United Arab Emirates ===
28 February
14:30 (AWST) (D/N)
Scorecard

United Arab Emirates; 102 (31.3 overs)	v	India; 104/1 (18.5 overs)
Shaiman Anwar 35 (49); Ravichandran Ashwin 4/25 (10 overs)		Rohit Sharma 57* (55); Mohammad Naveed 1/35 (5 overs)

India won by 9 wickets
WACA Ground, Perth
Umpires: Billy Bowden (NZ) and Michael Gough (Eng)
Player of the match: Ravichandran Ashwin (Ind)

- United Arab Emirates won the toss and elected to bat.

=== Pakistan vs Zimbabwe ===
1 March
13:30 (AEST) (D/N)
Scorecard

Pakistan; 235/7 (50 overs)	v	Zimbabwe; 215 (49.4 overs)
Misbah-ul-Haq 73 (121); Tendai Chatara 3/35 (10 overs)		Brendan Taylor 50 (72); Mohammad Irfan 4/30 (10 overs)

Pakistan won by 20 runs
Brisbane Cricket Ground, Brisbane
Umpires: Richard Kettleborough (Eng) and Joel Wilson (WI)
Player of the match: Wahab Riaz (Pak)

- Pakistan won the toss and elected to bat.
- Wahab Riaz became the first Pakistan player to score a 50 and take four wickets in a World Cup match.

=== Ireland vs South Africa ===
3 March
14:30 (AEDT) (D/N)
Scorecard

South Africa; 411/4 (50 overs)	v	Ireland; 210 (45 overs)
Hashim Amla 159 (128); Andrew McBrine 2/63 (10 overs)		Andrew Balbirnie 58 (71); Kyle Abbott 4/21 (8 overs)

South Africa won by 201 runs
Manuka Oval, Canberra
Umpires: Steve Davis (Aus) and Ranmore Martinesz (SL)
Player of the match: Hashim Amla (SA)

- South Africa won the toss and elected to bat.
- South Africa became the first team to score 400 in two consecutive ODI innings. Their total is also the second-highest in World Cup history.
- Hashim Amla and Faf du Plessis' partnership of 247 is the highest second-wicket partnership for South Africa in ODIs.

=== Pakistan vs United Arab Emirates ===
4 March
14:00 (NZDT) (D/N)
Scorecard

Pakistan; 339/6 (50 overs)	v	United Arab Emirates; 210/8 (50 overs)
Ahmed Shehzad 93 (105); Manjula Guruge 4/56 (8 overs)		Shaiman Anwar 62 (88); Shahid Afridi 2/35 (10 overs)

Pakistan won by 129 runs
McLean Park, Napier
Umpires: Johan Cloete (SA) and Sundaram Ravi (Ind)
Player of the match: Ahmed Shehzad (Pak)

- United Arab Emirates won the toss and elected to field.
- Shahid Afridi became the fourth Pakistan player to score 8,000 runs in ODI matches.

=== India vs West Indies ===
6 March
14:30 (AWST) (D/N)
Scorecard

West Indies; 182 (44.2 overs)	v	India; 185/6 (39.1 overs)
Jason Holder 57 (64); Mohammed Shami 3/35 (8 overs)		MS Dhoni 45* (56); Jerome Taylor 2/33 (8 overs)

India won by 4 wickets
WACA Ground, Perth
Umpires: Kumar Dharmasena (SL) and Nigel Llong (Eng)
Player of the match: Mohammed Shami (Ind)

- West Indies won the toss and elected to bat.
- India's victory was their eighth consecutive win in World Cups, equalling their longest winning streak.
- India qualified for the quarter-finals as a result of this match.

=== Pakistan vs South Africa ===
7 March
14:00 (NZDT) (D/N)
Scorecard

Pakistan; 222 (46.4 overs)	v	South Africa; 202 (33.3 overs)
Misbah-ul-Haq 56 (86); Dale Steyn 3/30 (10 overs)		AB de Villiers 77 (58); Rahat Ali 3/40 (8 overs)

Pakistan won by 29 runs (D/L method)
Eden Park, Auckland
Umpires: Richard Kettleborough (Eng) and Bruce Oxenford (Aus)
Player of the match: Sarfraz Ahmed (Pak)

- South Africa won the toss and elected to field.
- Match reduced to 47 overs per side and South Africa's target moved to 232 due to rain.
- This was the first time Pakistan defeated South Africa in a World Cup match.
- Sarfaraz Ahmed (Pak) became only the tenth player to take 6 dismissals in an ODI innings, and only the second in a World Cup match.

=== Ireland vs Zimbabwe ===
7 March
14:30 (AEDT) (D/N)
Scorecard

Ireland; 331/8 (50 overs)	v	Zimbabwe; 326 (49.3 overs)
Ed Joyce 112 (103); Tendai Chatara 3/61 (10 overs)		Brendan Taylor 121 (91); Alex Cusack 4/32 (9.3 overs)

Ireland won by 5 runs
Bellerive Oval, Hobart
Umpires: Ruchira Palliyaguruge (SL) and Paul Reiffel (Aus)
Player of the match: Ed Joyce (Ire)

- Zimbabwe won the toss and elected to field.
- Zimbabwe and United Arab Emirates were eliminated from the World Cup as a result of this match.

=== India vs Ireland ===
10 March
14:00 (NZDT) (D/N)
Scorecard

Ireland; 259 (49 overs)	v	India; 260/2 (36.5 overs)
Niall O'Brien 75 (75); Mohammed Shami 3/41 (9 overs)		Shikhar Dhawan 100 (85); Stuart Thompson 2/45 (6 overs)

India won by 8 wickets
Seddon Park, Hamilton
Umpires: Kumar Dharmasena (SL) and Richard Kettleborough (Eng)
Player of the match: Shikhar Dhawan (Ind)

- Ireland won the toss and elected to bat.
- India were confirmed as winners of Pool B as a result of this match.
- India's victory was their ninth consecutive win in World Cups, extending their longest winning streak.

=== South Africa vs United Arab Emirates ===
12 March
14:00 (NZDT) (D/N)
Scorecard

South Africa; 341/6 (50 overs)	v	United Arab Emirates; 195 (47.3 overs)
AB de Villiers 99 (82); Mohammad Naveed 3/63 (10 overs)		Swapnil Patil 57* (100); AB de Villiers 2/15 (3 overs)

South Africa won by 146 runs
Wellington Regional Stadium, Wellington
Umpires: Steve Davis (Aus) and Rod Tucker (Aus)
Player of the match: AB de Villiers (SA)

- United Arab Emirates won the toss and elected to field.
- AB de Villiers now holds the records for the most sixes in one World Cup tournament (20) and the most sixes in all World Cup matches (36).
- South Africa qualified for the quarter-finals as a result of this match.

=== India vs Zimbabwe ===
14 March
14:00 (NZDT) (D/N)
Scorecard

Zimbabwe; 287 (48.5 overs)	v	India; 288/4 (48.4 overs)
Brendan Taylor 138 (110); Umesh Yadav 3/43 (9.5 overs)		Suresh Raina 110* (104); Tinashe Panyangara 2/53 (8.4 overs)

India won by 6 wickets
Eden Park, Auckland
Umpires: Chris Gaffaney (NZ) and Bruce Oxenford (Aus)
Player of the match: Suresh Raina (Ind)

- India won the toss and elected to field.
- Suresh Raina and MS Dhoni's unbeaten partnership of 196 is the highest fifth-wicket partnership for India in a World Cup match.
- This was India's highest successful run chase in Cricket World Cup.

=== United Arab Emirates vs West Indies ===
15 March
11:00 (NZDT)
Scorecard

United Arab Emirates; 175 (47.4 overs)	v	West Indies; 176/4 (30.3 overs)
Nasir Aziz 60 (86); Jason Holder 4/27 (10 overs)		Johnson Charles 55 (40); Amjad Javed 2/29 (8 overs)

West Indies won by 6 wickets
McLean Park, Napier
Umpires: Aleem Dar (Pak) and Ranmore Martinesz (SL)
Player of the match: Jason Holder (WI)

- West Indies won the toss and elected to field.
- Shaiman Anwar (UAE) became the highest run-scorer by a player from an Associate nation in a World Cup.
- Amjad Javed and Nasir Aziz's 107-run partnership for the seventh wicket is a World Cup record and a UAE record for any wicket against a Test nation.

=== Ireland vs Pakistan ===
15 March
14:00 (ACDT) (D/N)
Scorecard

Ireland; 237 (50 overs)	v	Pakistan; 241/3 (46.1 overs)
William Porterfield 107 (131); Wahab Riaz 3/54 (10 overs)		Sarfraz Ahmed 101* (124); Alex Cusack 1/43 (10 overs)

Pakistan won by 7 wickets
Adelaide Oval, Adelaide
Umpires: Marais Erasmus (SA) and Ruchira Palliyaguruge (SL)
Player of the match: Sarfraz Ahmed (Pak)

- Ireland won the toss and elected to bat.
- Sarfraz Ahmed scored his maiden ODI century and became the first Pakistan wicket-keeper to score a century in a World Cup match.
- Pakistan and West Indies qualified for the quarter-finals as a result of this match.
- Ireland were eliminated from the World Cup as a result of this match.

This was Pakistan's highest opening first wicket stand in the tournament. The pair of Ahmad Shahzad and Sarfraz Ahmad put a first-wicket partnership of over 100 runs, with Sarfraz scoring 101 not out, and becoming man of the match in the two consecutive games he played. While Ahmad Shahzad scored 63 runs, ensuring Pakistan a spot in the quarter-finals to face Australia at the same ground.
