= 2015 Cricket World Cup =

11th edition of the Cricket World Cup

- Tournament logo
- Dates: 14 February – 29 March 2015
- Administrator: International Cricket Council
- Cricket format: One Day International
- Tournament format(s): Group Stage and Knockout Stage
- Hosts: Australia; New Zealand
- Champions: Australia (5th title)
- Runners-up: New Zealand
- Participants: 14
- Matches: 49
- Attendance: 1,016,420 (20,743 per match)
- Player of the series: (Australia) Mitchell Starc
- Most runs: (New Zealand) Martin Guptill (547)
- Most wickets: (Australia) Mitchell Starc (22) (New Zealand) Trent Boult (22)
- Official website: Official website

The 2015 ICC Cricket World Cup was the 11th Cricket World Cup, a quadrennial One Day International (ODI) cricket tournament contested by men's national teams and organised by the International Cricket Council (ICC). It was jointly hosted by Australia and New Zealand from 14 February to 29 March 2015, and was won by Australia, defeating New Zealand by 7 wickets in the final. This was the second time the tournament was held in Australia and New Zealand, the first having been the 1992 Cricket World Cup. India were the defending champions having won the previous edition in 2011, but they were eliminated by eventual champions Australia in the semi-finals.

The tournament consisted of 14 teams, which were split into two pools of seven, with each team playing every other team in their pool once. The top four teams from each pool progressed to the knockout stage, which consisted of quarter-finals, semi-finals and a final.

The final was between the co-hosts Australia and New Zealand. Australia won by seven wickets, to win their fifth Cricket World Cup.

The total attendance was 1,016,420, with an average of 21,175 per game. The final at the Melbourne Cricket Ground had a crowd of 93,013, a record one-day cricket crowd for Australia In India, the largest television rating was for the Australia–India semi-final, 15% of television-viewing households.

== Host selection ==
=== Bids ===
The ICC announced the hosts for the previous World Cup, the 2011 competition, on 30 April 2006. Australia and New Zealand had also bid for the tournament and a successful Australian bid for the 2011 World Cup would have seen a 50–50 split in games, with the final still up for negotiation. The Trans-Tasman bid, Beyond Boundaries, was the only bid for 2011 delivered to the ICC headquarters at Dubai before 1 March deadline. Considerable merits of the bid included the superior venues and infrastructure, and the total support of the Australian and New Zealand governments on tax and custom issues during the tournament, according to Cricket Australia chief executive James Sutherland. The New Zealand government had also assured that the Zimbabwean team would be allowed to take part in the tournament after political discussions about whether their team would be allowed to tour Zimbabwe in 2005.

ICC President Ehsan Mani said that the extra time required by the Asian bloc to hand over its bid had harmed the four-nation bid. However, when it came to the voting, the Asians won by seven votes to four; according to the Pakistan Cricket Board (PCB), it was the vote of the West Indies Cricket Board (WICB) that turned the matter. It was reported in Pakistani newspaper Dawn that the Asian countries promised to hold fundraising events for West Indian cricket during the 2007 Cricket World Cup, which may have influenced the vote. However, I.S. Bindra, chairman of the monitoring committee of the Asian bid, denied that, saying that it was their promise of extra profits of US$400 million that swung the vote their way.

The ICC was so impressed by the efficiency of the Trans-Tasman bid that they decided to award the next World Cup, to be held in 2015, to them.

Australia and New Zealand last jointly hosted the Cricket World Cup in 1992.

== Format ==
The tournament featured 14 teams, the same number as the 2011 World Cup, giving associate and affiliate member nations a chance to participate.

The format was the same as the 2011 edition: 14 teams take part in the initial stages, divided into two groups of seven; the seven teams play each other once before the top four teams from each group qualify for the quarter-finals.

On 29 January 2015, ICC reinstated the use of the Super Over for Cricket World Cup Final match if the match finished as a tie.

== Qualification ==
Highlighted are the countries to participate in the 2015 Cricket World Cup. Qualified as full member of ICC Qualified via WCL or qualifier Participated in final stage of the qualifying process, but failed to qualify

Per ICC regulations, the 10 ICC full member nations qualify for the tournament automatically. Immediately after the 2011 World Cup, it was decided that the next tournament would be reduced to only feature the 10 full members. This was met with heavy criticism from a number of associate nations, especially from the Ireland cricket team, who had performed well in 2007 and 2011, including victories over Pakistan and England, both full member nations. Following support shown by the ICC Cricket Committee for a qualification process, the ICC reversed their decision in June 2011 and decided that 14 teams would participate in the 2015 World Cup, including four associate or affiliate member nations.

At the ICC Chief Executives' Committee meeting in September 2011, the ICC decided on a new qualifying format. The top two teams of the 2011–13 ICC World Cricket League Championship qualify directly. The remaining six teams join the third and fourth-placed teams of 2011 ICC World Cricket League Division Two and the top two teams of 2013 ICC World Cricket League Division Three in a 10-team World Cup Qualifier to decide the remaining two places.

On 9 July 2013, as a result of a tied match against the Netherlands, Ireland became the first country to qualify for the 2015 World Cup. On 4 October 2013, Afghanistan qualified for their first Cricket World Cup after beating Kenya to finish in second place behind Ireland.

Scotland defeated the United Arab Emirates in the final of the 2014 Cricket World Cup Qualifier and both teams qualified for the last two spots in the 2015 Cricket World Cup.

Team	Method of qualification	Past appearances	Last appearance	Previous best performance	Rank (Note: Full members' ranks are based on the ICC ODI Championship rankings as of 31 December 2012.)	Group
England	Full members	10	2011	Runners-up (1979, 1987, 1992)	1	A
South Africa	Full members	6	2011	Semi-finals (1992, 1999, 2007)	2	B
India	Full members	10	2011	Champions (1983, 2011)	3	B
Australia	Full members	10	2011	Champions (1987, 1999, 2003, 2007)	4	A
Sri Lanka	Full members	10	2011	Champions (1996)	5	A
Pakistan	Full members	10	2011	Champions (1992)	6	B
West Indies	Full members	10	2011	Champions (1975, 1979)	7	B
Bangladesh	Full members	4	2011	Super 8 (2007)	8	A
New Zealand	Full members	10	2011	Semi-finals (1975, 1979, 1992, 1999, 2007, 2011)	9	A
Zimbabwe	Full members	8	2011	Super 6 (1999, 2003)	10	B
Ireland	WCL Championship	2	2011	Super 8 (2007)	11	B
Afghanistan	WCL Championship	0	—	—	12	A
Scotland	World Cup Qualifier	2	2007	Group stage (1999, 2007)	13	A
United Arab Emirates	World Cup Qualifier	1	1996	Group stage (1996)	14	B

== Preparations ==
=== Local organising committee ===
In preparation for the 2015 Cricket World Cup, the organising committee of the tournament was finalised. John Harnden was named chief executive, James Strong as chairman, and Ralph Waters was named as the deputy chairman. Following Strong's death in March 2013, Waters became chairman.

=== Allocation of matches ===
When Australia and New Zealand bid for the 2011 Cricket World Cup in 2006, they said that it will see a 50–50 split in games. Finally, it was decided on 30 July 2013 that Australia would host 26 matches, while New Zealand got a share of 23 matches in the tournament. There was a tense battle between Melbourne and Sydney to host the final. On 30 July 2013, it was announced that Melbourne would host the final, with Sydney and Auckland hosting the semi-finals.

=== Visas ===
It was announced that spectators travelling to World Cup matches in New Zealand who would otherwise not be entitled to a visa waiver, would be able to enter New Zealand if they held an Australian visitor visa. This was a special Trans-Tasman Visa Arrangement for the 2015 Cricket World Cup.

=== Media and promotion ===
Broadcasting rights for the 2015 Cricket World Cup were sold to ESPN Star Sports and Star Sports for US$2 billion. According to Strong, the Local Organising Committee (LOC) wants to make the tournament the most fan-friendly event of its kind and take cricket to a wide range of communities throughout Australia and New Zealand.

Sachin Tendulkar was named by the ICC as the World Cup Ambassador for the second time, after filling the role at the 2011 Cricket World Cup.

Tickets for India v Pakistan in Adelaide reportedly sold out within 12 minutes of going on sale. The match received an average television audience in India of 14.8% of TV-equipped households. The semi-final, Australia–India, had a higher average rating in India, 15.0%, but no 2015 match surpassed the 2011 Final among Indian viewers. The 2015 World Cup came at a time of declining viewing figures for cricket in India. Broadcaster Star Sports claimed that its coverage reached 635 million viewers in India. An ICC-commissioned report claimed that the tournament was watched by over 1.5 billion people.

==== Broadcasting rights ====
The following networks broadcast the tournament:

Location	Television broadcaster(s)	Radio broadcaster(s)	Web streaming
Afghanistan	Cable/satellite Ariana Television Network, Lemar TV		
Australia	Cable/satellite (pay): Fox Sports; Free-to-air: Nine Network (only Australia matches, both semi-finals and the final)	ABC (ABC Local Radio, ABC Digital Extra, ABC radio app, Grandstand Digital, Online), 3AW	Fox Sports (Foxsports.com.au)
Africa (except South Africa)	SuperSport		
Arab World	Cable/satellite OSN Sports Cricket	OSN.com/PlayWavo.com	OSN, Play Wavo
Bangladesh	Cable/satellite Bangladesh Television, Maasranga TV, Gazi Television and Star Sports	Bangladesh Betar	Star Sports
Bhutan			Star Sports
Canada	Cable/Satellite (pay): Sportsnet; Rogers Communications	EchoStar	broadband (pay): Rogers Cable
Central America	ESPN		
Europe (except UK and Ireland)			Star Sports
Fiji	Fiji TV; Fiji Broadcasting Corporation(highlights only)		Star Sports
India	Cable/satellite (pay): Star Sports (English and Hindi) Asianet Movies (Malayalam) STAR Vijay (Tamil) Suvarna Plus (Kannada) Jalsha Movies (Bengali); Free-to-air: DD National (only India matches, semi-finals and the final)	All India Radio (only India matches, quarter-finals, semi-finals and the final); AIR FM Rainbow (hourly updates)	Star Sports (http://www.starsports.com/cricket/index.html)
United Kingdom and Ireland	Cable/satellite (pay): Sky Sports 2 (renamed Sky Sports World Cup during tournament); Free-to-air: ITV and ITV4 – nightly highlights Zee TV Hindi highlights	BBC Radio	BSkyB
New Zealand	Cable/satellite (pay): Sky Sport; Free-to-air: Prime (only the first game, semi-final and final)		Sky Sport
Pakistan	Cable/satellite (pay): TEN Sports; Cable/satellite (free-to-air): PTV Sports		Star Sports
Singapore	Star Cricket		
South Africa	Free-to-air: South African Broadcasting Corporation 30 matches Cable/satellite: SuperSport	SABC	SuperSport
Sri Lanka	Free-to-air: Channel Eye; Cable/satellite: Star Sports		Star Sports
United Arab Emirates	OSN		
United States	Satellite (pay): ESPN		Broadband (pay): WatchESPN
Caribbean	Free-to-air: CMC; Satellite (pay): ESPN	CMC	CMC

- Source: (unless otherwise stated)

== Opening ceremony ==
The opening ceremonies were held separately in Christchurch, New Zealand and Melbourne, Australia, on 12 February 2015, two days before the first two matches.

== Prize money ==
The International Cricket Council declared a total prize money pool of $10 million for the tournament, which was 20 percent more than the 2011 edition. The prize money was distributed according to the performance of the team as follows:

Stage	Prize money (US$)	Total
Winner	$3,975,000	$3,975,000
Runner-up	$1,750,000	$1,750,000
Losing semi-finalists	$600,000	$1,200,000
Losing quarter-finalists	$300,000	$1,200,000
Winner of each group match	$45,000	$1,890,000
Teams eliminated in group stage	$35,000	$210,000
Total		$10,225,000

This means that if the winner had remained undefeated throughout the group stage of the tournament, they would have won a total of $4,245,000 (winner's prize plus $45,000 for each group stage win), while a team eliminated in the group stage without any wins would have gotten $35,000.

== Venues ==
Venues in Australia
Venues in New Zealand

Each venue hosted 3 pool stage matches. The quarter-finals were in Sydney, Melbourne, Adelaide and Wellington, the semi-finals were played in Auckland and Sydney, and the final was played in Melbourne. Altogether there were 49 matches in 14 venues, with Australia hosting 26 games and New Zealand hosting 23 games.

Venue	City	Country	Capacity	Matches
Adelaide Oval	Adelaide	Australia	53,500	4 (quarter-final)
The Gabba	Brisbane	Australia	42,000	3
Manuka Oval	Canberra	Australia	13,550	3
Bellerive Oval	Hobart	Australia	20,000	3
Melbourne Cricket Ground	Melbourne	Australia	100,000	5 (quarter-final, final)
WACA Ground	Perth	Australia	24,500	3
Sydney Cricket Ground	Sydney	Australia	48,000	5 (quarter-final, semi-final)
Eden Park	Auckland	New Zealand	50,000	4 (semi-final)
Hagley Oval	Christchurch	New Zealand	20,000	3
University Oval	Dunedin	New Zealand	6,000	3
Seddon Park	Hamilton	New Zealand	12,000	3
McLean Park	Napier	New Zealand	22,500	3
Saxton Oval	Nelson	New Zealand	5,000	3
Wellington Regional Stadium	Wellington	New Zealand	37,000	4 (quarter-final)

== Match officials ==
The umpire selection panel selected 20 umpires to officiate at the World Cup: five each from Australia and England, five from Asia, two each from New Zealand and South Africa and one from the West Indies.

== Squads ==
The teams, after initially naming a provisional 30-member squad, were required to finalise a 15-member squad for the tournament on or before 7 January 2015.

== Warm-up matches ==
Fourteen non-ODI warm-up matches were played from 8 to 13 February.

Warm-up matches

8 February 2015
14:00 (ACDT) (D/N)
Scorecard

Australia; 371 (48.2 overs)	v	India; 265 (45.1 overs)
Glenn Maxwell 122 (57); Mohammed Shami 3/83 (9.2 overs)		Ajinkya Rahane 66 (52); Pat Cummins 3/30 (6 overs)

Australia won by 106 runs
Adelaide Oval, Adelaide
Umpires: Chris Gaffaney (NZ) and Nigel Llong (Eng)

- Australia won the toss and elected to bat.

9 February 2015
11:00 (NZDT)
Scorecard

Sri Lanka; 279/7 (44.4 overs)	v	South Africa; 188/5 (24.3 overs)
Tillakaratne Dilshan 100 (83); Kyle Abbott 3/37 (6.4 overs)		Quinton de Kock 66 (55); Rangana Herath 3/22 (5 overs)

South Africa won by 5 wickets (D/L method)
Hagley Oval, Christchurch
Umpires: Richard Illingworth (Eng) and S. Ravi (Ind)

- South Africa won the toss and elected to field.
- Sri Lanka's innings ended after 44.4 overs and South Africa's target was reduced to 188 from 25 overs due to rain.

9 February 2015
11:00 (NZDT)
Scorecard

New Zealand; 157/7 (30.1 overs)	v	Zimbabwe
Martin Guptill 100 (86); Tinashe Panyangara 2/28 (5 overs)

No result
Bert Sutcliffe Oval, Lincoln
Umpires: Bruce Oxenford (Aus) and Ruchira Palliyaguruge (SL)

- New Zealand won the toss and elected to bat.
- Match ended after New Zealand innings due to rain.

9 February 2015
14:30 (AEDT) (D/N)
Scorecard

West Indies; 122 (29.3 overs)	v	England; 125/1 (22.5 overs)
Lendl Simmons 45 (55); Chris Woakes 5/19 (7.3 overs)		Moeen Ali 46 (43); Kemar Roach 1/31 (5 overs)

England won by 9 wickets
Sydney Cricket Ground, Sydney
Umpires: Aleem Dar (Pak) and Paul Reiffel (Aus)

- West Indies won the toss and elected to bat.

9 February 2015
14:30 (AEDT) (D/N)
Scorecard

Bangladesh; 246 (49.5 overs)	v	Pakistan; 247/7 (48.1 overs)
Mahmudullah Riyad 83 (109); Mohammad Irfan 5/52 (9.5 overs)		Sohaib Maqsood 93* (90); Taskin Ahmed 2/41 (7 overs)

Pakistan won by 3 wickets
Blacktown Olympic Park, Sydney
Umpires: Kumar Dharmasena (SL) and Joel Wilson (WI)

- Bangladesh won the toss and elected to bat.

10 February 2015
14:30 (AEDT) (D/N)
Scorecard

Scotland; 296/6 (50 overs)	v	Ireland; 117 (27 overs)
Matt Machan 103 (108); Max Sorensen 3/55 (10 overs)		Paul Stirling 37 (44); Alasdair Evans 4/17 (5 overs)

Scotland won by 179 runs
Blacktown Olympic Park, Sydney
Umpires: Aleem Dar (Pak) and Joel Wilson (WI)

- Scotland won the toss and elected to bat.

10 February 2015
14:00 (ACDT) (D/N)
Scorecard

India; 364/5 (50 overs)	v	Afghanistan; 211/8 (50 overs)
Rohit Sharma 150 (122); Hamid Hassan 1/49 (8 overs)		Nawroz Mangal 60 (85); Ravindra Jadeja 2/38 (10 overs)

India won by 153 runs
Adelaide Oval, Adelaide
Umpires: Marais Erasmus (SA) and Simon Fry (Aus)

- India won the toss and elected to bat.

11 February 2015
11:00 (NZDT)
Scorecard

New Zealand; 331/8 (50 overs)	v	South Africa; 197 (44.2 overs)
Kane Williamson 66 (53); Kyle Abbott 2/35 (6 overs)		JP Duminy 80 (98); Trent Boult 5/51 (9.2 overs)

New Zealand won by 134 runs
Hagley Oval, Christchurch
Umpires: Ranmore Martinesz (SL) and Rod Tucker (Aus)

- New Zealand won the toss and elected to bat.

11 February 2015
11:00 (NZDT)
Scorecard

Sri Lanka; 279/8 (50 overs)	v	Zimbabwe; 281/3 (45.2 overs)
Dimuth Karunaratne 58 (71); Sean Williams 3/35 (10 overs)		Hamilton Masakadza 117* (119); Nuwan Kulasekara 1/23 (5 overs)

Zimbabwe won by 7 wickets
Bert Sutcliffe Oval, Lincoln
Umpires: Richard Illingworth (Eng) and Bruce Oxenford (Aus)

- Sri Lanka won the toss and elected to bat.

11 February 2015
14:30 (AEDT) (D/N)
Scorecard

Australia; 304/8 (50 overs)	v	United Arab Emirates; 116 (30.1 overs)
Michael Clarke 64 (61); Krishna Chandran 3/50 (9 overs)		Swapnil Patil 31 (45); Xavier Doherty 2/3 (1.1 overs)

Australia won by 188 runs
Melbourne Cricket Ground, Melbourne
Umpires: Ian Gould (Eng) and Richard Kettleborough (Eng)

- Australia won the toss and elected to bat.

11 February 2015
14:30 (AEDT) (D/N)
Scorecard

England; 250/8 (50 overs)	v	Pakistan; 252/6 (48.5 overs)
Joe Root 85 (89); Yasir Shah 3/45 (10 overs)		Misbah-ul-Haq 91* (99); James Anderson 2/42 (10 overs)

Pakistan won by 4 wickets
Sydney Cricket Ground, Sydney
Umpires: Billy Bowden (NZ) and Steve Davis (Aus)

- England won the toss and elected to bat.

12 February 2015
09:30 (AEDT)
Scorecard

West Indies; 313/9 (50 overs)	v	Scotland; 310/9 (50 overs)
Denesh Ramdin 88 (86); Alasdair Evans 3/63 (10 overs)		Kyle Coetzer 96 (106); Andre Russell 2/32 (8 overs)

West Indies won by 3 runs
Sydney Cricket Ground, Sydney
Umpires: Johan Cloete (SA) and Paul Reiffel (Aus)

- West Indies won the toss and elected to bat.

12 February 2015
10:00 (AEDT)
Scorecard

Bangladesh; 189 (48.2 overs)	v	Ireland; 190/6 (46.5 overs)
Soumya Sarkar 45 (51); Max Sorensen 3/31 (9.2 overs)		Andrew Balbirnie 63* (79); Taijul Islam 2/29 (8 overs)

Ireland won by 4 wickets
Blacktown Olympic Park, Sydney
Umpires: Billy Bowden (NZ) and Kumar Dharmasena (SL)

- Ireland won the toss and elected to field.

13 February 2015
10:00 (AEDT)
Scorecard

Afghanistan; 308/9 (50 overs)	v	United Arab Emirates; 294 (48.2 overs)
Samiullah Shenwari 58 (80); Amjad Javed 4/39 (10 overs)		Khurram Khan 86 (70); Aftab Alam 3/43 (6.2 overs)

Afghanistan won by 14 runs
Junction Oval, Melbourne
Umpires: Michael Gough (Eng) and Ian Gould (Eng)

- Afghanistan won the toss and elected to bat.

== Group stage ==
A total of 42 matches were played throughout the group stage of the tournament. The top four teams from each pool qualified for the quarter-finals. In the event that two or more teams are tied on points after six matches the team with the most wins was to be ranked higher. If tied teams also had the same number of wins then they had to be ranked according to net run rate.

=== Pool A ===
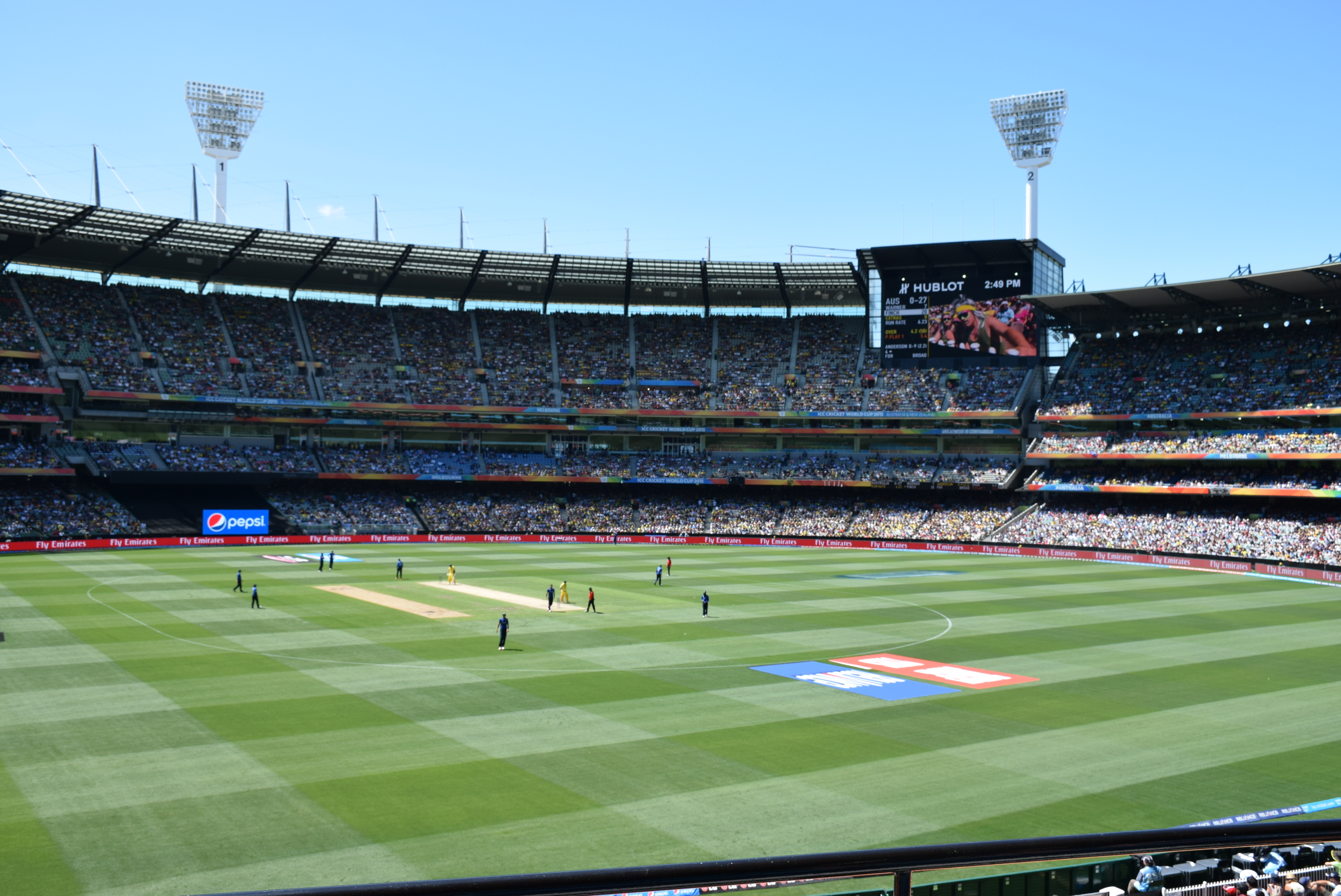
The second match of the Cricket World Cup at the MCG between Australia and England

Pos	Team	Pld	W	L	T	NR	Pts	NRR
1	New Zealand	6	6	0	0	0	12	2.564
2	Australia	6	4	1	0	1	9	2.257
3	Sri Lanka	6	4	2	0	0	8	0.371
4	Bangladesh	6	3	2	0	1	7	0.136
5	England	6	2	4	0	0	4	−0.753
6	Afghanistan	6	1	5	0	0	2	−1.853
7	Scotland	6	0	6	0	0	0	−2.218

Source: ESPNcricinfo
- Advanced to knockout stage.

14 February
Scorecard

New Zealand; 331/6 (50 overs)	v	Sri Lanka; 233 (46.1 overs)

New Zealand won by 98 runs
Hagley Oval, Christchurch

14 February (D/N)
Scorecard

Australia; 342/9 (50 overs)	v	England; 231 (41.5 overs)

Australia won by 111 runs
Melbourne Cricket Ground, Melbourne

17 February
Scorecard

Scotland; 142 (36.2 overs)	v	New Zealand; 146/7 (24.5 overs)

New Zealand won by 3 wickets
University Oval, Dunedin

18 February (D/N)
Scorecard

Bangladesh; 267 (50 overs)	v	Afghanistan; 162 (42.5 overs)

Bangladesh won by 105 runs
Manuka Oval, Canberra

20 February (D/N)
Scorecard

England; 123 (33.2 overs)	v	New Zealand; 125/2 (12.2 overs)

New Zealand won by 8 wickets
Wellington Regional Stadium, Wellington

21 February (D/N)
Scorecard

Australia	v	Bangladesh

Match abandoned without a ball bowled
Brisbane Cricket Ground, Brisbane

22 February
Scorecard

Afghanistan; 232 (49.4 overs)	v	Sri Lanka; 236/6 (48.2 overs)

Sri Lanka won by 4 wickets
University Oval, Dunedin

23 February
Scorecard

England; 303/8 (50 overs)	v	Scotland; 184 (42.2 overs)

England won by 119 runs
Hagley Oval, Christchurch

26 February
Scorecard

Scotland; 210 (50 overs)	v	Afghanistan; 211/9 (49.3 overs)

Afghanistan won by 1 wicket
University Oval, Dunedin

26 February (D/N)
Scorecard

Sri Lanka; 332/1 (50 overs)	v	Bangladesh; 240 (47 overs)

Sri Lanka won by 92 runs
Melbourne Cricket Ground, Melbourne

28 February (D/N)
Scorecard

Australia; 151 (32.2 overs)	v	New Zealand; 152/9 (23.1 overs)

New Zealand won by 1 wicket
Eden Park, Auckland

1 March
Scorecard

England; 309/6 (50 overs)	v	Sri Lanka; 312/1 (47.2 overs)

Sri Lanka won by 9 wickets
Wellington Regional Stadium, Wellington

4 March (D/N)
Scorecard

Australia; 417/6 (50 overs)	v	Afghanistan; 142 (37.3 overs)

Australia won by 275 runs
WACA Ground, Perth

5 March
Scorecard

Scotland; 318/8 (50 overs)	v	Bangladesh; 322/4 (48.1 overs)

Bangladesh won by 6 wickets
Saxton Oval, Nelson

8 March
Scorecard

Afghanistan; 186 (47.4 overs)	v	New Zealand; 188/4 (36.1 overs)

New Zealand won by 6 wickets
McLean Park, Napier

8 March (D/N)
Scorecard

Australia; 376/9 (50 overs)	v	Sri Lanka; 312 (46.2 overs)

Australia won by 64 runs
Sydney Cricket Ground, Sydney

9 March (D/N)
Scorecard

Bangladesh; 275/7 (50 overs)	v	England; 260 (48.3 overs)

Bangladesh won by 15 runs
Adelaide Oval, Adelaide

11 March (D/N)
Scorecard

Sri Lanka; 363/9 (50 overs)	v	Scotland; 215 (43.1 overs)

Sri Lanka won by 148 runs
Bellerive Oval, Hobart

13 March (D/N)
Scorecard

Bangladesh; 288/7 (50 overs)	v	New Zealand; 290/7 (48.5 overs)

New Zealand won by 3 wickets
Seddon Park, Hamilton

13 March (D/N)
Scorecard

Afghanistan; 111/7 (36.2 overs)	v	England; 101/1 (18.1 overs)

England won by 9 wickets (D/L method)
Sydney Cricket Ground, Sydney

14 March (D/N)
Scorecard

Scotland; 130 (25.4 overs)	v	Australia; 133/3 (15.2 overs)

Australia won by 7 wickets
Bellerive Oval, Hobart

=== Pool B ===
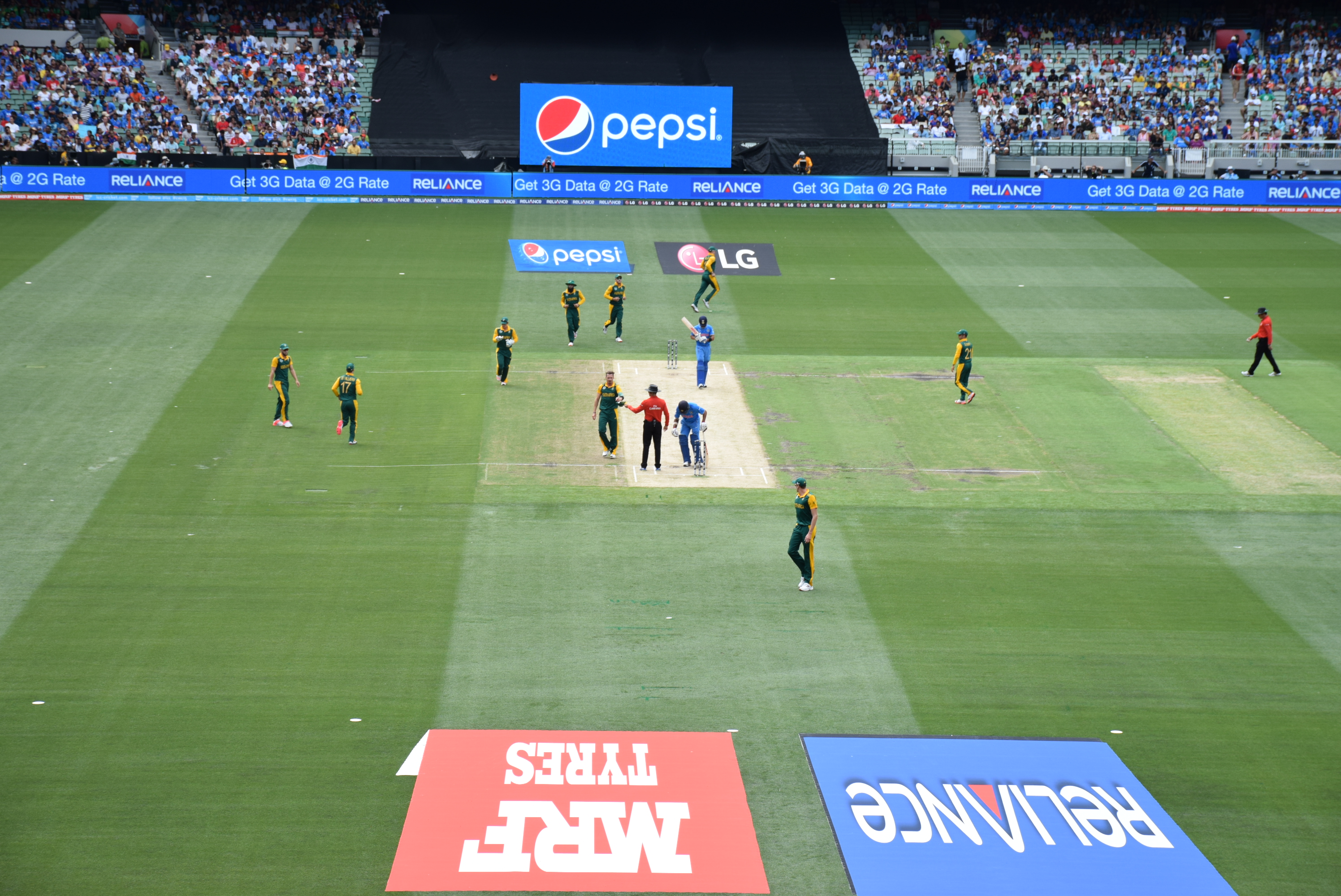
Pool B clash between India and South Africa

Pos	Team	Pld	W	L	T	NR	Pts	NRR
1	India	6	6	0	0	0	12	1.827
2	South Africa	6	4	2	0	0	8	1.707
3	Pakistan	6	4	2	0	0	8	−0.085
4	West Indies	6	3	3	0	0	6	−0.053
5	Ireland	6	3	3	0	0	6	−0.933
6	Zimbabwe	6	1	5	0	0	2	−0.527
7	United Arab Emirates	6	0	6	0	0	0	−2.032

Source: ESPNcricinfo
- Advanced to knockout stage.

15 February (D/N)
Scorecard

South Africa; 339/4 (50 overs)	v	Zimbabwe; 277 (48.2 overs)

South Africa won by 62 runs
Seddon Park, Hamilton

15 February (D/N)
Scorecard

India; 300/7 (50 overs)	v	Pakistan; 224 (47 overs)

India won by 76 runs
Adelaide Oval, Adelaide

16 February
Scorecard

West Indies; 304/7 (50 overs)	v	Ireland; 307/6 (45.5 overs)

Ireland won by 4 wickets
Saxton Oval, Nelson

19 February
Scorecard

United Arab Emirates; 285/7 (50 overs)	v	Zimbabwe; 286/6 (48 overs)

Zimbabwe won by 4 wickets
Saxton Oval, Nelson

21 February
Scorecard

West Indies; 310/6 (50 overs)	v	Pakistan; 160 (39 overs)

West Indies won by 150 runs
Hagley Oval, Christchurch

22 February (D/N)
Scorecard

India; 307/7 (50 overs)	v	South Africa; 177 (40.2 overs)

India won by 130 runs
Melbourne Cricket Ground, Melbourne

24 February (D/N)
Scorecard

West Indies; 372/2 (50 overs)	v	Zimbabwe; 289 (44.3 overs)

West Indies won by 73 runs
Manuka Oval, Canberra

25 February (D/N)
Scorecard

United Arab Emirates; 278/9 (50 overs)	v	Ireland; 279/8 (49.2 overs)

Ireland won by 2 wickets
Brisbane Cricket Ground, Brisbane

27 February (D/N)
Scorecard

South Africa; 408/5 (50 overs)	v	West Indies; 151 (33.1 overs)

South Africa won by 257 runs
Sydney Cricket Ground, Sydney

28 February (D/N)
Scorecard

United Arab Emirates; 102 (31.3 overs)	v	India; 104/1 (18.5 overs)

India won by 9 wickets
WACA Ground, Perth

1 March (D/N)
Scorecard

Pakistan; 235/7 (50 overs)	v	Zimbabwe; 215 (49.4 overs)

Pakistan won by 20 runs
Brisbane Cricket Ground, Brisbane

3 March (D/N)
Scorecard

South Africa; 411/4 (50 overs)	v	Ireland; 210 (45 overs)

South Africa won by 201 runs
Manuka Oval, Canberra

4 March (D/N)
Scorecard

Pakistan; 339/6 (50 overs)	v	United Arab Emirates; 210/8 (50 overs)

Pakistan won by 129 runs
McLean Park, Napier

6 March (D/N)
Scorecard

West Indies; 182 (44.2 overs)	v	India; 185/6 (39.1 overs)

India won by 4 wickets
WACA Ground, Perth

7 March (D/N)
Scorecard

Pakistan; 222 (46.4 overs)	v	South Africa; 202 (33.3 overs)

Pakistan won by 29 runs (D/L method)
Eden Park, Auckland

7 March (D/N)
Scorecard

Ireland; 331/8 (50 overs)	v	Zimbabwe; 326 (49.3 overs)

Ireland won by 5 runs
Bellerive Oval, Hobart

10 March (D/N)
Scorecard

Ireland; 259 (49 overs)	v	India; 260/2 (36.5 overs)

India won by 8 wickets
Seddon Park, Hamilton

12 March (D/N)
Scorecard

South Africa; 341/6 (50 overs)	v	United Arab Emirates; 195 (47.3 overs)

South Africa won by 146 runs
Wellington Regional Stadium, Wellington

14 March (D/N)
Scorecard

Zimbabwe; 287 (48.5 overs)	v	India; 288/4 (48.4 overs)

India won by 6 wickets
Eden Park, Auckland

15 March
Scorecard

United Arab Emirates; 175 (47.4 overs)	v	West Indies; 176/4 (30.3 overs)

West Indies won by 6 wickets
McLean Park, Napier

15 March (D/N)
Scorecard

Ireland; 237 (50 overs)	v	Pakistan; 241/3 (46.1 overs)

Pakistan won by 7 wickets
Adelaide Oval, Adelaide

== Knockout stage ==
While the dates and venues were fixed, which match-up they host was subject to change to accommodate the host countries should they qualify. Both hosts qualified for the quarter-finals; Australia played the match on 20 March in Adelaide, and New Zealand played the match on 21 March in Wellington. Since Sri Lanka, the next highest ranked team, progressed to the quarter-finals, they played in Sydney. If England had advanced, as they were the third-highest ranked team, they would have played in Melbourne. As England failed to qualify for the quarter-finals, Bangladesh took their place. The teams from each pool was paired based on the A1 v B4, A2 v B3, A3 v B2, A4 v B1 format.

New Zealand's semi-final against South Africa was played on 24 March in Auckland while Australia's semi-final against India was played on 26 March in Sydney. Both the host nations qualified for the final, where Australia defeated New Zealand by 7 wickets.

The knockout stage was held from 18 to 29 March 2015. The top four teams from Pool A and Pool B advanced to the knockout stage to compete in a single-elimination style tournament. If a quarter-final or semi-final ended as a tie or no result, then the team which was placed higher in the group stages would have qualified. If the final ended in a tie, the match would have been decided by a one-over eliminator.

Of the eight teams entering the stage, the team finishing first on Pool A played the team finishing fourth in Pool B while the team finishing second in Pool A played the team finishing third in Pool B and so on, in the format A1 v B4, A2 v B3, A3 v B2 and A4 v B1. Hosts Australia and New Zealand had home advantage for the quarter-final and semi-final matches that they qualified for.

New Zealand, Australia, Sri Lanka, and Bangladesh qualified for this stage from Pool A, while India, South Africa, Pakistan and West Indies qualified from Pool B.

New Zealand, Australia, South Africa, and India qualified for the semi-finals by beating West Indies, Pakistan, Sri Lanka, and Bangladesh respectively. In the semi-finals, New Zealand beat South Africa and Australia beat India to qualify for the finals.

=== Tournament bracket ===
Quarter-finals
A3	Sri Lanka	133
B2	South Africa	134/1
A1	New Zealand	393/6
B4	West Indies	250
B3	Pakistan	213
A2	Australia	216/4
B1	India	302/6
A4	Bangladesh	193

Semi-finals
B2	South Africa	281/5
A1	New Zealand	299/6
A2	Australia	328/7
B1	India	233

Final
A1	New Zealand	183
A2	Australia	186/3

=== Matches ===
==== Quarter-finals ====
South Africa v Sri Lanka

18 March
14:30 (AEDT) (D/N)
Scorecard

Sri Lanka; 133 (37.2 overs)	v	South Africa; 134/1 (18 overs)
Kumar Sangakkara 45 (96); Imran Tahir 4/26 (8.2 overs)		Quinton de Kock 78* (57); Lasith Malinga 1/43 (6 overs)

South Africa won by 9 wickets
Sydney Cricket Ground, Sydney
Umpires: Nigel Llong (Eng) and Rod Tucker (Aus)
Player of the match: Imran Tahir (SA)

- Sri Lanka won the toss and elected to bat.
- JP Duminy (SA) became the first South African to take a World Cup hat-trick when he dismissed Angelo Mathews, Nuwan Kulasekara and Tharindu Kaushal, and only the second South African in ODI history.
- This was South Africa's first win in the knockout stage of a World Cup.
- This was the shortest ever World Cup knockout match.
- This was the last ODI game for Kumar Sangakkara (SL) and Mahela Jayawardene (SL) and their 150th game together.

India v Bangladesh

19 March
14:30 (AEDT) (D/N)
Scorecard

India; 302/6 (50 overs)	v	Bangladesh; 193 (45 overs)
Rohit Sharma 137 (126); Taskin Ahmed 3/69 (10 overs)		Nasir Hossain 35 (34); Umesh Yadav 4/31 (9 overs)

India won by 109 runs
Melbourne Cricket Ground, Melbourne
Umpires: Aleem Dar (Pak) and Ian Gould (Eng)
Player of the match: Rohit Sharma (Ind)

- India won the toss and elected to bat.
- This was MS Dhoni's 100th ODI win as India captain.
- This was a record seventh consecutive match in which India bowled the opposition out.
- The umpires received widespread criticism after some controversial decision-making. International Cricket Council President Mustafa Kamal said that Bangladesh would appeal against the decisions of the umpires in ICC's board meeting.
- Mashrafe Mortaza (Ban) was suspended for one ODI, and fined 40% of his match fee for a slow over rate; the other Bangladesh players were fined 20% of their match fee.

Australia v Pakistan

20 March
14:00 (ACDT) (D/N)
Scorecard

Pakistan; 213 (49.5 overs)	v	Australia; 216/4 (33.5 overs)
Haris Sohail 41 (57); Josh Hazlewood 4/35 (10 overs)		Steve Smith 65 (69); Wahab Riaz 2/54 (9 overs)

Australia won by 6 wickets
Adelaide Oval, Adelaide
Umpires: Kumar Dharmasena (SL) and Marais Erasmus (SA)
Player of the match: Josh Hazlewood (Aus)

- Pakistan won the toss and elected to bat.
- This was the last ODI for Shahid Afridi and Misbah-ul-Haq (both Pak).
- Wahab Riaz (Pak) was fined 50% of his match fee, and Shane Watson (Aus) was fined 15% of his match fee, after a verbal encounter at the end of the 33rd over.

New Zealand v West Indies

21 March
14:00 (NZDT) (D/N)
Scorecard

New Zealand; 393/6 (50 overs)	v	West Indies; 250 (30.3 overs)
Martin Guptill 237* (163); Jerome Taylor 3/71 (7 overs)		Chris Gayle 61 (33); Trent Boult 4/44 (10 overs)

New Zealand won by 143 runs
Wellington Regional Stadium, Wellington
Umpires: Richard Kettleborough (Eng) and Bruce Oxenford (Aus)
Player of the match: Martin Guptill (NZ)

- New Zealand won the toss and elected to bat.
- Martin Guptill became the first player to score two consecutive centuries for New Zealand in a World Cup.
- Guptill also scored the first ever double-hundred in a World Cup knockout match, and the first double-hundred by a New Zealand player in an ODI.
- Guptill's score of 237* is the highest individual score in a World Cup match and second highest in ODIs.
- The match had the most sixes hit in a World Cup match (31) and the second highest number of sixes in any ODI match.

==== Semi-finals ====
New Zealand v South Africa

24 March
14:00 (NZDT) (D/N)
Scorecard

South Africa; 281/5 (43 overs)	v	New Zealand; 299/6 (42.5 overs)
Faf du Plessis 82 (107); Corey Anderson 3/72 (6 overs)		Grant Elliott 84* (73); Morne Morkel 3/59 (9 overs)

New Zealand won by 4 wickets (D/L method)
Eden Park, Auckland
Umpires: Ian Gould (Eng) and Rod Tucker (Aus)
Player of the match: Grant Elliott (NZ)

- South Africa won the toss and elected to bat.
- Match reduced to 43 overs per side and New Zealand's target revised to 298 due to rain.
- This was the highest successful run-chase in a World Cup knockout match.
- This was the first time New Zealand qualified for a World Cup final.
- This was South Africa's fourth semi-final loss in World Cups.

Australia v India

26 March
14:30 (AEDT) (D/N)
Scorecard

Australia; 328/7 (50 overs)	v	India; 233 (46.5 overs)
Steve Smith 105 (93); Umesh Yadav 4/72 (9 overs)		MS Dhoni 65 (65); James Faulkner 3/59 (9 overs)

Australia won by 95 runs
Sydney Cricket Ground, Sydney
Umpires: Kumar Dharmasena (SL) and Richard Kettleborough (Eng)
Player of the match: Steve Smith (Aus)

- Australia won the toss and elected to bat.
- Australia qualified for the World Cup final for a record seventh time.
- Australia's total of 328/7 is the highest score in a World Cup semi-final.
- As a result of this match, no Asian team qualified for World Cup final, for the first time since 1987.

==== Final ====
29 March 2015
14:30 (D/N)
Scorecard

New Zealand; 183 (45 overs)	v	Australia; 186/3 (33.1 overs)
Grant Elliott 83 (82); Mitchell Johnson 3/30 (9 overs)		Michael Clarke 74 (72); Matt Henry 2/46 (9.1 overs)

Australia won by 7 wickets
Melbourne Cricket Ground, Melbourne
Attendance: 93,013
Umpires: Kumar Dharmasena (SL) and Richard Kettleborough (Eng)
Player of the match: James Faulkner (Aus)

- New Zealand won the toss and elected to bat.
- Australia won the Cricket World Cup for the fifth time.
- This was the last ODI played by Michael Clarke (Aus), Brad Haddin (Aus), Daniel Vettori (NZ) and Mitchell Johnson (Aus).
- The crowd of 93,013 was the largest in the history of cricket in Australia, beating the previous record of 91,112 for a Test match on 26 December 2013. The country's previous ODI record crowd was 87,182 for the 1992 final.

== Statistics ==
=== Most runs ===
Player	Team	Runs
Martin Guptill	New Zealand	547
Kumar Sangakkara	Sri Lanka	541
AB de Villiers	South Africa	482
Brendan Taylor	Zimbabwe	433
Shikhar Dhawan	India	412

- Source: CricInfo

=== Most wickets ===
Player	Team	Wickets
Mitchell Starc	Australia	22
Trent Boult	New Zealand	22
Umesh Yadav	India	18
Mohammed Shami	India	17
Morné Morkel	South Africa	17
Jerome Taylor	West Indies	17

- Source: CricInfo

=== Team of the tournament ===
The ICC announced its team of the tournament on 30 March 2015.

Player	Role
(New Zealand) Martin Guptill	Opening batsman
(New Zealand) Brendon McCullum	Opening batsman/captain
(Sri Lanka) Kumar Sangakkara	Wicket-keeper
(Australia) Steve Smith	Batsman
(South Africa) AB de Villiers	Batsman
(Australia) Glenn Maxwell	All-rounder
(New Zealand) Corey Anderson	All-rounder
(New Zealand) Daniel Vettori	All-rounder
(Australia) Mitchell Starc	Bowler
(New Zealand) Trent Boult	Bowler
(South Africa) Morné Morkel	Bowler
(Zimbabwe) Brendan Taylor	12th man

== Controversies ==
- The Pool A match between Australia and England ended when James Anderson was run out straight after James Taylor was given out lbw. Because Taylor's decision was reviewed and overturned, the ICC later admitted that the ball should have been declared dead (according to Article 3.6a of Appendix 6 of the Decision Review System Playing Conditions), and so Anderson was incorrectly given out.
- During the Pool B match between Ireland and Zimbabwe, Sean Williams was caught by Ireland's John Mooney in a close run chase. Mooney was extremely close to the boundary and eight different television replays were inconclusive as to whether his foot had touched the boundary rope. Meanwhile, Williams had walked and the umpires signalled him out.
- During the second quarter-final match between India and Bangladesh, Rubel Hossain bowled a full toss to Rohit Sharma who was caught at square-leg. The umpire thought the ball was too high and declared it a no-ball, meaning the batsman was not out. There were also another instance where Shikhar Dhawan caught a ball hit by Mahmudullah Riyad near the boundary line, but there was accusation that his leg touched the boundary line after catching the ball. The ICC's Bangladeshi President, Mustafa Kamal, later questioned the integrity of the umpire and threatened to resign in protest However, ICC chief executive Dave Richardson claimed the accusations were baseless, and based on personal feelings of an individual. He said the incident was a 50–50 call and the decision belonged to the umpire.

== See also ==
- List of Cricket World Cup centuries
