= Carisbrook =

Former stadium in Dunedin, New Zealand

- The House of Pain
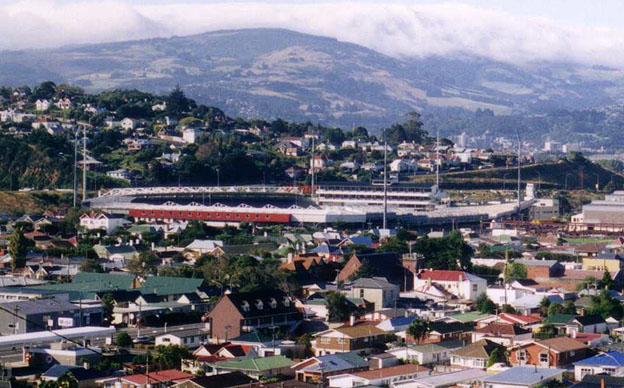
- Interactive map of Carisbrook
- Location: Dunedin, New Zealand
- Coordinates: 45°53′37″S 170°29′26″E
- Owner: Carisbrook Ground Company
- Operator: Carisbrook Ground Company
- Capacity: 29,000
- Surface: Grass

Construction
- Groundbreaking: 1881
- Opened: 1883
- Closed: 2011
- Demolished: Starting 2013

Tenants
- Otago Rugby Football Union; Highlanders (Super 14) (1996–2011)

Ground information
- End names
- Railway End; Hillside End

International information
- First men's Test: 11–16 March 1955: New Zealand v England
- Last men's Test: 18–22 December 1998: New Zealand v India
- First men's ODI: 30 March 1974: New Zealand v Australia
- Last men's ODI: 25 February 2004: New Zealand v South Africa
- First women's Test: 17–21 March 1961: New Zealand v Australia
- Last women's Test: 8–12 January 1977: New Zealand v India
- Only women's ODI: 13 February 1999: New Zealand v South Africa
- As of 1 September 2020; Source: ESPNcricinfo

Carisbrook (sometimes incorrectly referred to as Carisbrook Stadium) was a major sporting venue in Dunedin, New Zealand. The city's main domestic and international rugby union venue, it was also used for other sports such as cricket, football, rugby league and motocross.

Carisbrook also hosted a Joe Cocker concert and frequently hosted pre-game concerts before rugby matches in the 1990s. In 2011 Carisbrook was closed, and was replaced as a rugby ground by Forsyth Barr Stadium in North Dunedin, and as a cricket ground by University Oval in Logan Park.

== History ==
Located at the foot of The Glen, a steep valley, the ground was flanked by the South Island Main Trunk Railway and the Hillside Railway Workshops, two miles southwest of Dunedin city centre in the suburb of Caversham. State Highway 1 also ran close to the northern perimeter of the ground.

Carisbrook was named after the estate of early colonial settler James Macandrew (itself named after Carisbrooke Castle on the Isle of Wight). Developed during the 1870s, it was first used for international cricket in 1883, when Otago hosted a team from Tasmania, and for Test cricket from 1955. It hosted rugby union internationals from 1908. In 1922, Carisbrook hosted the first international football match between Australia and New Zealand. The hosts won 3–1.

Floodlit since the 1990s, it could cater for both day and night fixtures. Known locally simply as "The Brook", it was branded with the name "The House of Pain", due to its reputation as a difficult venue for visiting rugby teams. The stadium was home to both the Highlanders in Super Rugby and Otago in the ITM Cup through each team's respective 2011 season. It also hosted 38 All Blacks test matches.

It is also the former home of Otago cricket, which moved to the University Oval at Logan Park in the north of the city after its redevelopment in the early 2000s. Between 1884 and 2008 Carisbrook hosted 252 first-class cricket matches, including, between 1955 and 1998, 10 Test cricket matches.

It was also the home ground of Otago United in the New Zealand Football Championship, which moved to the lower-capacity Sunnyvale Park for the 2008–09 season.

== Stands ==
The ground's final regular capacity was around 30,000, but it hosted crowds as high as 42,000 with temporary seating. Until 1998 the teams of the Caversham bypass motorway allowed a free view of the ground and was known as the "Scotsman's Grandstand". Occasionally trains would slow to a crawl or stop on the track above the stadium, allowing passengers to watch. In 1998 a new stand and corporate boxes were built that blocked the view.

Partly due to Dunedin's relatively large number of tertiary students (20,000 of the city's 120,000 population), Carisbrook had a unique atmosphere. This was enhanced by the terraces, an uncovered concrete embankment at the eastern end of the ground.

== Retirement and recycling ==
The closure of Carisbrook was first announced in 2006, to be replaced as a rugby venue by a 30,000 capacity covered stadium built in Dunedin North, close to other major sporting facilities such as Logan Park and the University Oval. Construction and ownership of the new $NZ 198 million stadium, officially named the Forsyth Barr Stadium at University Plaza, would be overseen by the Carisbrook Stadium Trust.

Until the new stadium was completed, all international and Super Rugby games were still held at Carisbrook, with the last scheduled match played against Wales on 19 June 2010, and a later Test match played New Zealand and Fiji as a fundraiser for the Christchurch earthquake appeal on 22 July 2011. The All Blacks played against every major Test-playing nation at Carisbrook at least once.

In 2011, the Dunedin City Council decided that Carisbrook would be sold after the 2011 Rugby World Cup – which featured no matches at Carisbrook. Demolition began at the start of 2012, with the floodlight towers being dismantled and sent to Christchurch for use by the new temporary Christchurch Rugby Stadium at Addington Showgrounds, to allow that city a first-class ground while AMI Stadium awaited rebuilding. Originally the floodlights were to be reused at the University Oval for day/night cricket matches. The corporate box stand, which was only 14 years old, was always designed to be dismantled for use elsewhere, and there are proposals to move parts of the structure to University Oval and some to Queenstown's Stadium. The turnstile building on Neville Street is a category I historic building and were protected during any potential developments on the site.

Carisbrook was sold to the Dunedin City Council in 2009 for $7,000,000. It was sold on in 2013 for $4,700,000.

== Historic events ==
- 1884 2 February – First major cricket match at Carisbrook, Otago v Tasmania
- 1886 22 November – First international cricket match at Carisbrook, Otago v Australia
- 1908 30 May – First Otago Rugby defeat of international team, Anglo-Welsh
- 1908 30 June – First Rugby Test at Carisbrook (NZ v Anglo-Welsh)
- 1922 17 June – New Zealand's first full international football (soccer) match, a 3–1 win to New Zealand over Australia
- 1924 9 August – First Rugby League Test at Carisbrook (NZ v England Lions)
- 1930 21 June – First All Black defeat at Carisbrook (by Great Britain)
- 1936 1 August – First Ranfurly Shield match at Carisbrook
- 1955 11 March – First cricket Test at Carisbrook, New Zealand v England
- 1987 May–June – Rugby World Cup games (Italy 18, Fiji 15; Ireland 46, Canada 19)
- 1991 21 September – Otago wins NPC Final against Auckland
- 1992 12 March – Cricket World Cup (New Zealand vs India)
- 1992 27 September – First extra time in a rugby match in New Zealand (Otago 26, North Harbour 23)
- 1993 July – Rugby, New Zealand v Australia, largest attendance at the ground, 42 000.
- 1996 3 March – First Super 12 match at Carisbrook (Otago Highlanders 57, Queensland 17)
- 1998 25 October – National Provincial Championship Division 1 Final (Otago vs Waikato)
- 1998 18 December – Last cricket Test at Carisbrook, New Zealand v India
- 1999 29 May – 1999 Super 12 Final (Highlanders vs Crusaders)
- 1999 12–21 November – Group stage matches and one quarter-final of the FIFA Under-17 Soccer World Championship
- 2001 11 August – First win by Australia over the All Blacks (23–15) at the venue
- 2005 27 August – The last International Rugby match (All Blacks 31, South Africa 27) before the NZRFU deemed Carisbrook to no longer be a suitable venue for international rugby
- 2008 12 July – After a 3-year absence of international rugby at Carisbrook a Tri Nations match between All Blacks and South Africa was played. It was South Africa's first win at Carisbrook, beating the All Blacks 30–28.
- 2010 19 June – The last official rugby Test against a "Tier 1" nation was played at the ground (All Blacks vs Wales), with the All Blacks winning 42–9.
- 2011 3 June – The final Highlanders match at Carisbrook saw the Western Force defeat the Highlanders 21–14.
- 2011 22 July – The All Blacks defeated Fiji 60–14 in the final Test match, which served as a fundraiser for Christchurch earthquake relief.
- 2012 January – Dismantlement begins with floodlight towers being sent to Christchurch.

== See also ==
- Forsyth Barr Stadium at University Plaza
- The Edgar Centre
- Logan Park, Dunedin
- University Oval, Dunedin
- List of Test cricket grounds
