= Ross Dykes =

New Zealand cricketer (1945–2020)

Personal information
- Full name: Ross Alexander Dykes
- Born: 26 February 1945; Auckland, New Zealand
- Died: 30 November 2020 (aged 75); Auckland, New Zealand
- Batting: Left-handed
- Role: Wicketkeeper-batsman

Domestic team information
- Years: Team
- 1967/68–1976/–77: Auckland

Career statistics
Competition	First-class	List A
Matches	31	8
Runs scored	723	74
Batting average	20.08	14.80
100s/50s	0/2	0/0
Top score	82	38
Catches/stumpings	57/24	8/3
- Source: Cricinfo, 14 November 2018

Ross Alexander Dykes (26 February 1945 – 30 November 2020) was a New Zealand cricketer who played 31 first-class matches for Auckland in the Plunket Shield between 1967 and 1977. A wicketkeeper and left-handed batsman, he made 81 dismissals and scored 723 runs.

Dykes continued to serve cricket, becoming a New Zealand selector for 13 years, then chief executive of the Otago Cricket Association for 10 years, retiring in 2015. A major achievement of his tenure was the development of University Oval in Dunedin as New Zealand's seventh Test ground.

Dykes died in Auckland on 30 November 2020, aged 75.
