= 2015 Cricket World Cup Pool A =

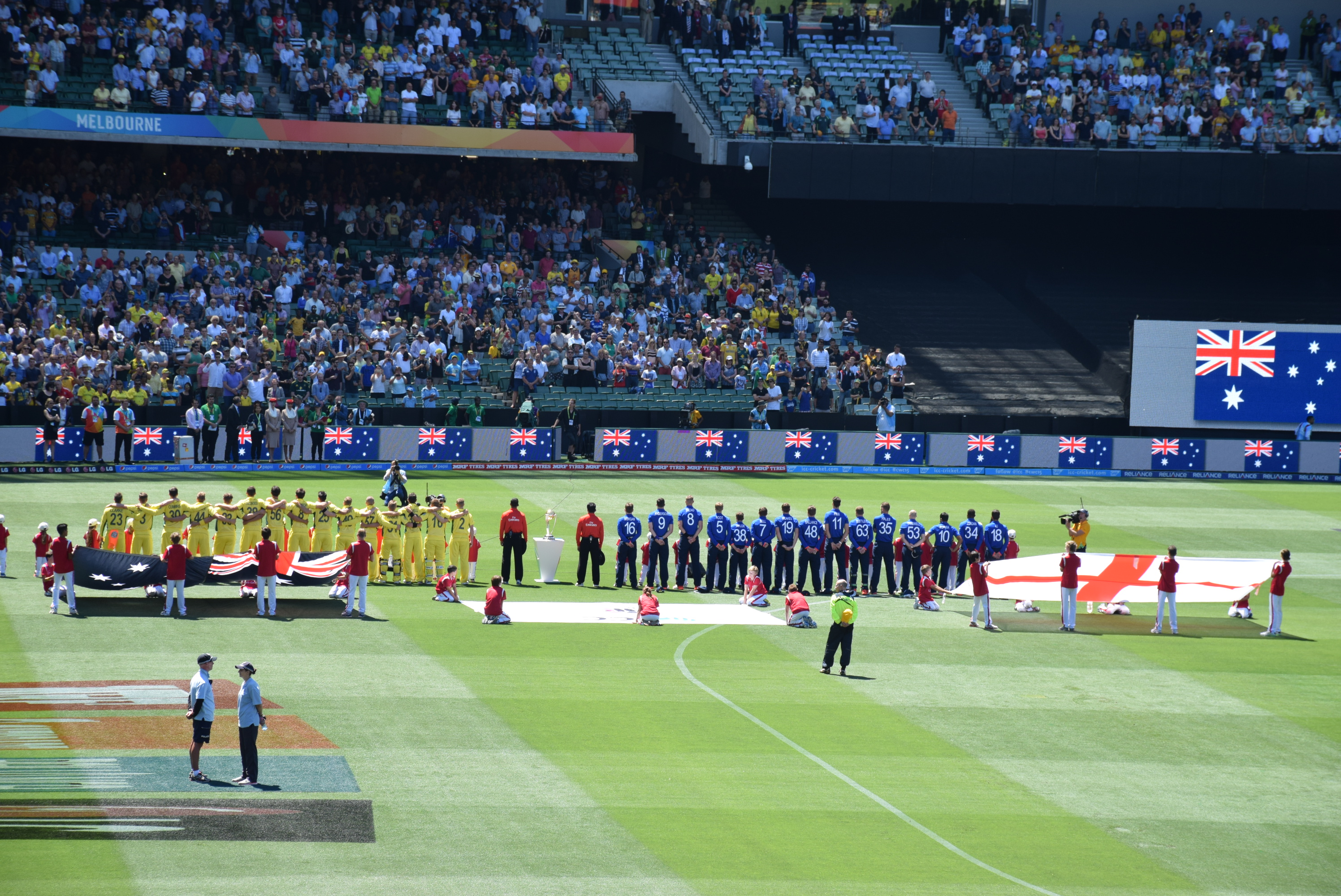
Australia and England lining up for the national anthems before the start of their match

Pool A of the 2015 Cricket World Cup took place from 14 February to 14 March 2015. The group consisted of co-hosts Australia and New Zealand, and along with them, England, Sri Lanka, Bangladesh, Afghanistan and Scotland. This phase of the tournament was played as a full round-robin between all seven teams, with the top four teams, New Zealand, Australia, Sri Lanka and Bangladesh, advancing to the quarter-finals.

== Standings ==
Pos	Team	Pld	W	L	T	NR	Pts	NRR
1	New Zealand	6	6	0	0	0	12	2.564
2	Australia	6	4	1	0	1	9	2.257
3	Sri Lanka	6	4	2	0	0	8	0.371
4	Bangladesh	6	3	2	0	1	7	0.136
5	England	6	2	4	0	0	4	−0.753
6	Afghanistan	6	1	5	0	0	2	−1.853
7	Scotland	6	0	6	0	0	0	−2.218

Source: ESPNcricinfo
- Advanced to knockout stage.

== Matches ==
=== New Zealand vs Sri Lanka ===
14 February
11:00 (NZDT)
Scorecard

New Zealand; 331/6 (50 overs)	v	Sri Lanka; 233 (46.1 overs)
Corey Anderson 75 (46); Jeevan Mendis 2/5 (2 overs)		Lahiru Thirimanne 65 (60); Corey Anderson 2/18 (3.1 overs)

New Zealand won by 98 runs
Hagley Oval, Christchurch
Attendance: 17,228
Umpires: Marais Erasmus (SA) and Nigel Llong (Eng)
Player of the match: Corey Anderson (NZ)

- Sri Lanka won the toss and elected to field.
- Kumar Sangakkara (SL) became the second highest run scorer in ODIs.

The opening game of the 2015 Cricket World Cup saw hosts New Zealand playing Sri Lanka. Sri Lanka won the toss and elected to field. Kumar Sangakkara (SL) moved into second place in the list of players with the most runs in ODI matches, overtaking Ricky Ponting (Aus).

=== Australia vs England ===
14 February
14:30 (AEDT) (D/N)
Scorecard

Australia; 342/9 (50 overs)	v	England; 231 (41.5 overs)
Aaron Finch 135 (128); Steven Finn 5/71 (10 overs)		James Taylor 98* (90); Mitchell Marsh 5/33 (9 overs)

Australia won by 111 runs
MCG, Melbourne
Attendance: 84,336
Umpires: Aleem Dar (Pak) and Kumar Dharmasena (SL)
Player of the match: Aaron Finch (Aus)

- England won the toss and elected to field.
- Steven Finn took a hat-trick in this match dismissing Brad Haddin, Glenn Maxwell and Mitchell Johnson in three successive deliveries.
- The match ended when James Anderson was run out straight after James Taylor was given out lbw. As Taylor's decision was reviewed and overturned, the ICC later admitted that the ball should have been declared dead (according to Article 3.6a of Appendix 6 of the Decision Review System Playing Conditions), and so Anderson was incorrectly given out.

Australia were put in to bat by England who won the toss. After opener Aaron Finch was dropped in the first over without having scored, Australia raced away to 52, before David Warner and Shane Watson were dismissed off consecutive balls in the eighth over. In the 11th over, the dismissal of Steve Smith left Australia at 70/3. Captain George Bailey then joined Finch and the two added 146 runs in 26 overs for the fourth wicket. Finch was run out for 135 and soon Bailey was also sent back for 55. Glenn Maxwell and Mitchell Marsh then put on 53 runs in 7 overs for the sixth wicket before Marsh fell and the Australian score read 281/6 in the 46th over. Brad Haddin came into bat at 9 and shared a partnership of 61 runs off just 27 balls with Maxwell. In the final over of the innings, Steven Finn removed Haddin for a 14-ball 31 and Maxwell for a 40-ball 66 off consecutive balls. Finn completed the hat-trick getting the wicket of Mitchell Johnson off the final ball, and Australia finished at 342/9.

England's chase started with Mitchell Starc breaking the opening stand of 25, following which Marsh picked the next five wickets. England were reduced to 92/6, before James Taylor and Chris Woakes steadied the innings with a 92-run partnership. After Woakes fell for 37, Australia picked two more wickets off consecutive overs. From 195/9, England could add 36 runs for the last wicket before a controversial run out ended their innings. Taylor remained unbeaten on 98 as Australia secured a 111-run victory. Finch won the Man of the Match award for his knock.

=== New Zealand vs Scotland ===
17 February
11:00 (NZDT)
Scorecard

Scotland; 142 (36.2 overs)	v	New Zealand; 146/7 (24.5 overs)
Matt Machan 56 (79); Daniel Vettori 3/24 (8.2 overs)		Kane Williamson 38 (45); Josh Davey 3/40 (7 overs)

New Zealand won by 3 wickets
University Oval, Dunedin
Attendance: 4,684
Umpires: Simon Fry (Aus) and Nigel Llong (Eng)
Player of the match: Trent Boult (NZ)

- New Zealand won the toss and elected to field.
- Four players were dismissed for golden ducks during Scotland's innings, the first such instance in World Cups. Five Scotland players were dismissed for ducks, the most in Scotland's history.

New Zealand captain Brendon McCullum won the toss and put Scotland in to bat. Trent Boult and Tim Southee picked up two wickets each within the first five overs of the innings which left Scotland at 12/4. Both Matt Machan and Richie Berrington then scored fifties before being dismissed by Corey Anderson. Scotland's lower order offered little resistance and their innings ended in 36.2 overs at 142. Anderson and Daniel Vettori picked 3 wickets each for New Zealand.

In reply, New Zealand lost wickets at regular intervals from the start and were 66/3 in the 11th over. Kane Williamson and Grant Elliott put on 40 runs for the fourth wicket, before Williamson fell for 38. Scotland picked another three wickets in quick time to leave New Zealand 137/7 in the 24th over. Vettori scored an unbeaten 8 from 4 balls and New Zealand went on to win the match by 3 wickets. Boult was awarded the Man of the Match for his bowling figures of 6-1-21-2 in Scotland's innings.

=== Afghanistan vs Bangladesh ===
18 February
14:30 (AEDT) (D/N)
Scorecard

Bangladesh; 267 (50 overs)	v	Afghanistan; 162 (42.5 overs)
Mushfiqur Rahim 71 (56); Shapoor Zadran 2/20 (7 overs)		Mohammad Nabi 44 (43); Mashrafe Mortaza 3/20 (9 overs)

Bangladesh won by 105 runs
Manuka Oval, Canberra
Attendance: 10,972
Umpires: Steve Davis (Aus) and Joel Wilson (WI)
Player of the match: Mushfiqur Rahim (Ban)

- Bangladesh won the toss and elected to bat.
- Shakib Al Hasan became the first Bangladeshi cricketer to reach 4,000 ODI runs.

=== New Zealand vs England ===
20 February
14:00 (NZDT) (D/N)
Scorecard

England; 123 (33.2 overs)	v	New Zealand; 125/2 (12.2 overs)
Joe Root 46 (70); Tim Southee 7/33 (9 overs)		Brendon McCullum 77 (25); Chris Woakes 2/8 (3 overs)

New Zealand won by 8 wickets
Wellington Regional Stadium, Wellington
Attendance: 30,148
Umpires: Paul Reiffel (Aus) and Rod Tucker (Aus)
Player of the match: Tim Southee (NZ)

- England won the toss and elected to bat.
- Tim Southee (NZ) took the third-best bowling figures in World Cup history and the best by a New Zealander in ODIs.
- Brendon McCullum (NZ) scored the fastest fifty in World Cup history (18 balls), the third-fastest overall and the fastest ODI fifty by a New Zealander.

England captain Eoin Morgan, after winning the toss, elected to bat first. England were bowled out for 123 in the 34th over, having lost their last seven wickets for 19 runs in eight overs. New Zealand fast bowler Tim Southee picked up 7/33 in his 9 overs, which was the third-best haul in World Cup history. Joe Root, who scored 46, was the only England batsman to show some resilience.

New Zealand's chase got off to a brisk start, mainly due to their captain Brendon McCullum who scored the fastest World Cup fifty reaching the landmark in just 18 balls. New Zealand had made 105 in 7 overs without losing a wicket. McCullum was dismissed off the first ball of the eighth over for 77, and the other opener, Martin Guptill also fell to the bowling of Chris Woakes in the tenth over. New Zealand consolidated the innings following this and went on to win the game by 8 wickets with more than 37 overs to spare. Southee won the Man of the Match for his bowling efforts.

=== Australia vs Bangladesh ===
21 February
13:30 (AEST) (D/N)
Scorecard

Australia	v	Bangladesh

Match abandoned without a ball being bowled
The Gabba, Brisbane
Umpires: Kumar Dharmasena (SL) and Billy Bowden (NZ)

- No toss.
- Match called off at 16:42 due to heavy rain.
- This was only the second ever World Cup match abandoned without a ball being bowled.

=== Afghanistan vs Sri Lanka ===
22 February
11:00 (NZDT)
Scorecard

Afghanistan; 232 (49.4 overs)	v	Sri Lanka; 236/6 (48.2 overs)
Asghar Afghan 54 (57); Lasith Malinga 3/41 (7 overs)		Mahela Jayawardene 100 (120); Hamid Hassan 3/45 (9 overs)

Sri Lanka won by 4 wickets
University Oval, Dunedin
Attendance: 2,711
Umpires: Chris Gaffaney (NZ) and Richard Illingworth (Eng)
Player of the match: Mahela Jayawardene (SL)

- Sri Lanka won the toss and elected to field.
- Both Sri Lanka openers (Lahiru Thirimanne and Tillakaratne Dilshan) were dismissed for golden ducks. It was the second time in ODI history where this has occurred.
- Hamid Hassan became first Afghan bowler to take 50 ODI wickets and seventh-quickest in the world to take 50 ODI wickets.

Sri Lankan captain Angelo Mathews won the toss and elected to field. Afghanistan got off to a solid start before both their openers were dismissed off consecutive overs and the score read 40/2 in the tenth over. Asghar Stanikzai and Samiullah Shenwari built a steady third-wicket partnership which was broken when Afghanistan had reached 128 in the 28th over. Following this, Afghanistan started losing wickets at regular intervals to the Sri Lankan pace bowlers before finally being bowled out for 232 in 49.4 overs. Lasith Malinga and Mathews picked 3 wickets each for Sri Lanka.

Sri Lanka's innings got off to a disastrous start as both openers fell for ducks within the second over. Then in the sixth over, they lost the wicket of Kumar Sangakkara with the score at 18/3. They slipped into further trouble when Dimuth Karunaratne was dismissed in the 12th over with the Sri Lankan total still at 51. Mahela Jayawardene and Mathews then added 126 runs for the fifth wicket. Mathews was run out for 44 and Jayawardene was dismissed soon after completing his 19th ODI hundred. Thisara Perera, who came in to bat with Sri Lanka in a precarious position of 178/6, struck an unbeaten 47 from 26 balls to guide his team to a four-wicket win with ten balls to spare. Jayawardene was awarded the Man of the Match for his innings of 100 from 120 balls.

=== England vs Scotland ===
23 February
11:00 (NZDT)
Scorecard

England; 303/8 (50 overs)	v	Scotland; 184 (42.2 overs)
Moeen Ali 128 (107); Josh Davey 4/68 (10 overs)		Kyle Coetzer 71 (84); Steven Finn 3/26 (9 overs)

England won by 119 runs
Hagley Oval, Christchurch
Attendance: 12,388
Umpires: Sundaram Ravi (Ind) and Rod Tucker (Aus)
Player of the match: Moeen Ali (Eng)

- Scotland won the toss and elected to field.

=== Afghanistan vs Scotland ===
26 February
11:00 (NZDT)
Scorecard

Scotland; 210 (50 overs)	v	Afghanistan; 211/9 (49.3 overs)
Matt Machan 31 (28); Shapoor Zadran 4/38 (10 overs)		Samiullah Shenwari 96 (147); Richie Berrington 4/40 (10 overs)

Afghanistan won by 1 wicket
University Oval, Dunedin
Attendance: 3,229
Umpires: Simon Fry (Aus) and Ruchira Palliyaguruge (SL)
Player of the match: Samiullah Shenwari (Afg)

- Afghanistan won the toss and elected to field.
- This was the first time Scotland scored over 200 in a World Cup match.
- Alasdair Evans and Majid Haq's ninth-wicket partnership of 62 was Scotland's best ninth-wicket partnership in ODIs.
- This was Afghanistan's first ever World Cup win.
- Scotland captain Preston Mommsen was fined 20% of his match fee, and the other Scotland players 10%, for a slow over rate.

=== Bangladesh vs Sri Lanka ===
26 February
14:30 (AEDT) (D/N)
Scorecard

Sri Lanka; 332/1 (50 overs)	v	Bangladesh; 240 (47 overs)
Tillakaratne Dilshan 161* (146); Rubel Hossain 1/62 (9 overs)		Sabbir Rahman 53 (62); Lasith Malinga 3/35 (9 overs)

Sri Lanka won by 92 runs
MCG, Melbourne
Attendance: 30,012
Umpires: Aleem Dar (Pak) and Paul Reiffel (Aus)
Player of the match: Tillakaratne Dilshan (SL)

- Sri Lanka won the toss and elected to bat.
- Tillakaratne Dilshan and Kumar Sangakkara's unbroken partnership of 210 was Sri Lanka's highest second-wicket partnership in ODIs.
- Kumar Sangakkara became the fourth cricketer to play 400 ODI matches.
- Dilshan's score of 161 not out was the highest individual score in an ODI without hitting a six.

=== New Zealand vs Australia ===
28 February
14:00 (NZDT) (D/N)
Scorecard

Australia; 151 (32.2 overs)	v	New Zealand; 152/9 (23.1 overs)
Brad Haddin 43 (41); Trent Boult 5/27 (10 overs)		Brendon McCullum 50 (24); Mitchell Starc 6/28 (9 overs)

New Zealand won by 1 wicket
Eden Park, Auckland
Attendance: 40,053
Umpires: Marais Erasmus (SA) and Richard Illingworth (Eng)
Player of the match: Trent Boult (NZ)

- Australia won the toss and elected to bat.
- This is Australia's lowest score batting first in a World Cup game.
- Australia lost 8/26 during their innings, their worst collapse in ODI history.
- This match was played for the Chappell–Hadlee Trophy, the trophy which is usually the prize in any stand-alone ODI series between Australia and New Zealand.
- New Zealand qualified for the quarter-finals as a result of this match.

Australian captain Michael Clarke won the toss and elected to bat first. Australia got off to a brisk start, putting up 48/1 at the end of the first five overs. However, Shane Watson and David Warner were dismissed off consecutive balls with the score at 80. This triggered a collapse, with Trent Boult picking up five wickets in the first three overs of his second spell. Australia were left struggling at 106/9 at the end of 22 overs, before Brad Haddin and Pat Cummins put on 45 runs for the 10th wicket to take the Australian total to 151.

New Zealand started off rapidly in their chase, thanks to a 21-ball fifty from their captain Brendon McCullum who took his team to 72/1 after 7 overs. Soon after, Australia fought back picking up three wickets in five deliveries. New Zealand began rebuilding with a 52-run partnership between Kane Williamson and Corey Anderson. The partnership was broken when Anderson was dismissed by Glenn Maxwell and the score read 131/5. In the next three overs, Mitchell Starc and Cummins took four more wickets between them, leaving New Zealand at 146/9 in 23 overs. With 6 runs needed from 27 overs, Williamson struck a six off the bowling of Cummins to give New Zealand a memorable one-wicket victory. Williamson ended up with an unbeaten 45 and the Man of the Match was awarded to Boult who had figures of 5/27 in his 10 overs, including three maidens. New Zealand also won the Chappell–Hadlee Trophy as a result of this win.

=== England vs Sri Lanka ===
1 March
11:00 (NZDT)
Scorecard

England; 309/6 (50 overs)	v	Sri Lanka; 312/1 (47.2 overs)
Joe Root 121 (108); Tillakaratne Dilshan 1/35 (8.2 overs)		Lahiru Thirimanne 139* (143); Moeen Ali 1/50 (10 overs)

Sri Lanka won by 9 wickets
Wellington Regional Stadium, Wellington
Attendance: 18,183
Umpires: Bruce Oxenford (Aus) and Rod Tucker (Aus)
Player of the match: Kumar Sangakkara (SL)

- England won the toss and elected to bat.
- Joe Root became the youngest English player to score a century at a World Cup.
- Lahiru Thirimanne became the youngest Sri Lankan player to score a century at a World Cup.
- Sri Lanka became the first team in a World Cup match to chase down a score of more than 300 runs for the loss of only one wicket.
- Suranga Lakmal (SL) was fined 30% of his match fee for bowling two beamers in the final over.

England captain Eoin Morgan won the toss and elected for his side to bat first. The England openers started solidly, but they were reduced from 62/0 in the 10th over to 101/3 in the 21st. Joe Root and Morgan added 60 runs for the fourth wicket before the dismissal of Morgan. The fifth wicket partnership between Root and James Taylor yielded 98 runs in 11 overs. Taylor fell for 25, following which Root was also dismissed for a 108-ball 121. England were 265/6 in the 47th over, before Jos Buttler struck an unbeaten 39 in 19 balls to take the total to 309/6 at the end of 50 overs.

Sri Lankan innings began with Lahiru Thirimanne being dropped on 3. His opening partner Tillakaratne Dilshan was out for 44 immediately after their partnership had reached 100 runs. Kumar Sangakkara joined Thirimanne and the left-hand duo punished the England bowlers with each of the batsmen making hundreds. Thirimanne struck a six off the third ball of the 48th over to complete an emphatic 9-wicket victory. Thirimanne remained unbeaten on a 143-ball 139, while Sangakkara won the Man of the Match for his unbeaten 117 off just 86 balls.

=== Australia vs Afghanistan ===
4 March
14:30 (AWST) (D/N)
Scorecard

Australia; 417/6 (50 overs)	v	Afghanistan; 142 (37.3 overs)
David Warner 178 (133); Shapoor Zadran 2/89 (10 overs)		Nawroz Mangal 33 (35); Mitchell Johnson 4/22 (7.3 overs)

Australia won by 275 runs
WACA Ground, Perth
Attendance: 12,710
Umpires: Kumar Dharmasena (SL) and Michael Gough (Eng)
Player of the match: David Warner (Aus)

- Afghanistan won the toss and elected to field.
- Australia's score of 417/6 is the second highest in World Cup history.
- Dawlat Zadran (Afg) became the third bowler in World Cup matches to concede 100 runs or more in an innings.
- Australia's victory margin of 275 runs is the third highest in World Cup history.

Afghanistan captain Mohammad Nabi won the toss and put Australia in to bat. After losing the wicket of Aaron Finch in the third over, Australia put on a 260-run second wicket partnership between David Warner and Steve Smith, before Warner was dismissed for 178 off 133 balls. Smith and Glenn Maxwell then shared 65 runs in 32 balls for the third wicket before Smith fell five runs short of a hundred. Maxwell continued scoring at a brisk rate, but, in the 48th over, he was dismissed for a 39-ball 88. Brad Haddin scored an unbeaten 20 off 9 balls towards the end of the innings to push the Australian total to 417/6 at the end of their 50 overs, which was the highest-ever total in a World Cup match.

Afghanistan's chase was dented at regular intervals by the Australian fast bowlers. Former Afghan captain Nawroz Mangal top-scored for his team with 33 and no other batsman could go past 25. Mitchell Johnson picked up four wickets for Australia as Afghanistan were bowled out for 142 in 37.3 overs. This gave Australia a 275-run victory, the third largest victory in terms of runs in a World Cup match.

=== Bangladesh vs Scotland ===
5 March
11:00 (NZDT)
Scorecard

Scotland; 318/8 (50 overs)	v	Bangladesh; 322/4 (48.1 overs)
Kyle Coetzer 156 (134); Taskin Ahmed 3/43 (7 overs)		Tamim Iqbal 95 (100); Josh Davey 2/68 (10 overs)

Bangladesh won by 6 wickets
Saxton Oval, Nelson
Attendance: 3,491
Umpires: Simon Fry (Aus) and Bruce Oxenford (Aus)
Player of the match: Kyle Coetzer (Sco)

- Bangladesh won the toss and elected to field.
- This was the first time Scotland scored more than 300 in a World Cup match, and the first time ever that Scotland scored more than 300 against a Test-playing nation.
- Kyle Coetzer scored Scotland's maiden World Cup century and the highest score by an associate nation player in World Cups.
- This is Bangladesh's highest ODI run-chase and second highest run-chase in World Cup history.
- Scotland was eliminated from the World Cup as a result of this match.

=== New Zealand vs Afghanistan ===
8 March
11:00 (NZDT)
Scorecard

Afghanistan; 186 (47.4 overs)	v	New Zealand; 188/4 (36.1 overs)
Najibullah Zadran 56 (56); Daniel Vettori 4/18 (10 overs)		Martin Guptill 57 (76); Shapoor Zadran 1/45 (10 overs)

New Zealand won by 6 wickets
McLean Park, Napier
Attendance: 10,022
Umpires: Johan Cloete (SA) and Marais Erasmus (SA)
Player of the match: Daniel Vettori (NZ)

- Afghanistan won the toss and elected to bat.
- Daniel Vettori (NZ) took his 300th ODI wicket in this match.
- Afghanistan was eliminated from the World Cup as a result of this match.

=== Australia vs Sri Lanka ===
8 March
14:30 (AEDT) (D/N)
Scorecard

Australia; 376/9 (50 overs)	v	Sri Lanka; 312 (46.2 overs)
Glenn Maxwell 102 (53); Lasith Malinga 2/59 (10 overs)		Kumar Sangakkara 104 (107); James Faulkner 3/48 (9 overs)

Australia won by 64 runs
SCG, Sydney
Attendance: 39,951
Umpires: Aleem Dar (Pak) and Ian Gould (Eng)
Player of the match: Glenn Maxwell (Aus)

- Australia won the toss and elected to bat.
- Umpire Ian Gould stood in his 100th ODI match.
- Glenn Maxwell scored his maiden ODI century, the fastest by an Australian in a World Cup (51 balls) and the second-fastest overall.
- Tillakaratne Dilshan hit six fours off an over, bowled by Mitchell Johnson, the first time this has happened in World Cup history.
- Kumar Sangakkara became the second player to score 14,000 ODI runs, and scored a record third consecutive World Cup century.
- Dinesh Chandimal retired hurt, and did not return to complete his innings.
- New Zealand were confirmed as Pool A winners as a result of this match.
- Australia qualified for the quarter-finals as a result of this match.

Australian captain Michael Clarke won the toss and elected to bat. A shaky start in the opening, led to the fall of David Warner for 9. The shaky start from Australia continued when the other opener Finch fell for 24.

=== Bangladesh vs England ===
9 March
14:00 (ACDT) (D/N)
Scorecard

Bangladesh; 275/7 (50 overs)	v	England; 260 (48.3 overs)
Mahmudullah Riyad 103 (138); James Anderson 2/45 (10 overs)		Jos Buttler 65 (52); Rubel Hossain 4/53 (9.3 overs)

Bangladesh won by 15 runs
Adelaide Oval, Adelaide
Attendance: 11,963
Umpires: Billy Bowden (NZ) and Paul Reiffel (Aus)
Player of the match: Mahmudullah Riyad (Ban)

- England won the toss and elected to field.
- Mahmudullah Riyad became the first player to score a century for Bangladesh in a World Cup match.
- Mahmudullah Riyad and Mushfiqur Rahim's partnership of 141 was the highest partnership for any wicket for Bangladesh in a World Cup match. It was also Bangladesh's highest ODI partnership against England.
- This was also Bangladesh's highest score in an ODI against England.
- Bangladesh and Sri Lanka qualified for the quarter-finals as a result of this match. This was only the second time that Bangladesh had progressed past the group stage of a World Cup and their first appearance in the knockout stage.
- England was eliminated from the World Cup as a result of this match.
- Bangladesh captain Mashrafe Mortaza was fined 40% of his match fee for a slow over rate. The other Bangladesh players were fined 20% of their match fee.

=== Scotland vs Sri Lanka ===
11 March
14:30 (AEDT) (D/N)
Scorecard

Sri Lanka; 363/9 (50 overs)	v	Scotland; 215 (43.1 overs)
Kumar Sangakkara 124 (95); Josh Davey 3/63 (8 overs)		Freddie Coleman 70 (74); Nuwan Kulasekara 3/20 (7 overs)

Sri Lanka won by 148 runs
Bellerive Oval, Hobart
Attendance: 3,549
Umpires: Richard Illingworth (Eng) and Joel Wilson (WI)
Player of the match: Kumar Sangakkara (SL)

- Sri Lanka won the toss and elected to bat.
- Kumar Sangakkara hit a record fourth consecutive ODI century.
- Sangakkara has now taken 54 dismissals as a wicket keeper, the most by any player in World Cups.
- Angelo Mathews scored Sri Lanka's fastest World Cup fifty and their second fastest in all ODIs (20 balls).
- This is the highest score conceded by Scotland in an ODI.

=== New Zealand vs Bangladesh ===
13 March
14:00 (NZDT) (D/N)
Scorecard

Bangladesh; 288/7 (50 overs)	v	New Zealand; 290/7 (48.5 overs)
Mahmudullah Riyad 128* (123); Corey Anderson 2/43 (10 overs)		Martin Guptill 105 (100); Shakib Al Hasan 4/55 (8.5 overs)

New Zealand won by 3 wickets
Seddon Park, Hamilton
Attendance: 10,347
Umpires: Kumar Dharmasena (SL) and Richard Kettleborough (Eng)
Player of the match: Martin Guptill (NZ)

- New Zealand won the toss and elected to field.
- Mahmudullah Riyad became the first Bangladesh player to score two consecutive World Cup centuries.
- Ross Taylor became the fourth New Zealand player to score 5,000 runs in ODI matches.

=== Afghanistan vs England ===
13 March
14:30 (AEDT) (D/N)
Scorecard

Afghanistan; 111/7 (36.2 overs)	v	England; 101/1 (18.1 overs)
Shafiqullah 30 (64); Chris Jordan 2/13 (6.2 overs)		Ian Bell 52* (56); Hamid Hassan 1/17 (5 overs)

England won by 9 wickets (D/L method)
SCG, Sydney
Attendance: 9,203
Umpires: Billy Bowden (NZ) and Sundaram Ravi (Ind)
Player of the match: Chris Jordan (Eng)

- England won the toss and elected to field.
- Afghanistan's innings ended in the 37th over and England's target reduced to 101 off 25 overs due to rain.

=== Australia vs Scotland ===
14 March
14:30 (AEDT) (D/N)
Scorecard

Scotland; 130 (25.4 overs)	v	Australia; 133/3 (15.2 overs)
Matt Machan 40 (35); Mitchell Starc 4/14 (4.4 overs)		Michael Clarke 47 (47); Rob Taylor 1/29 (5 overs)

Australia won by 7 wickets
Bellerive Oval, Hobart
Attendance: 12,177
Umpires: Ian Gould (Eng) and Richard Illingworth (Eng)
Player of the match: Mitchell Starc (Aus)

- Australia won the toss and elected to field.
