= Seddon Park =

New Zealand Cricket ground

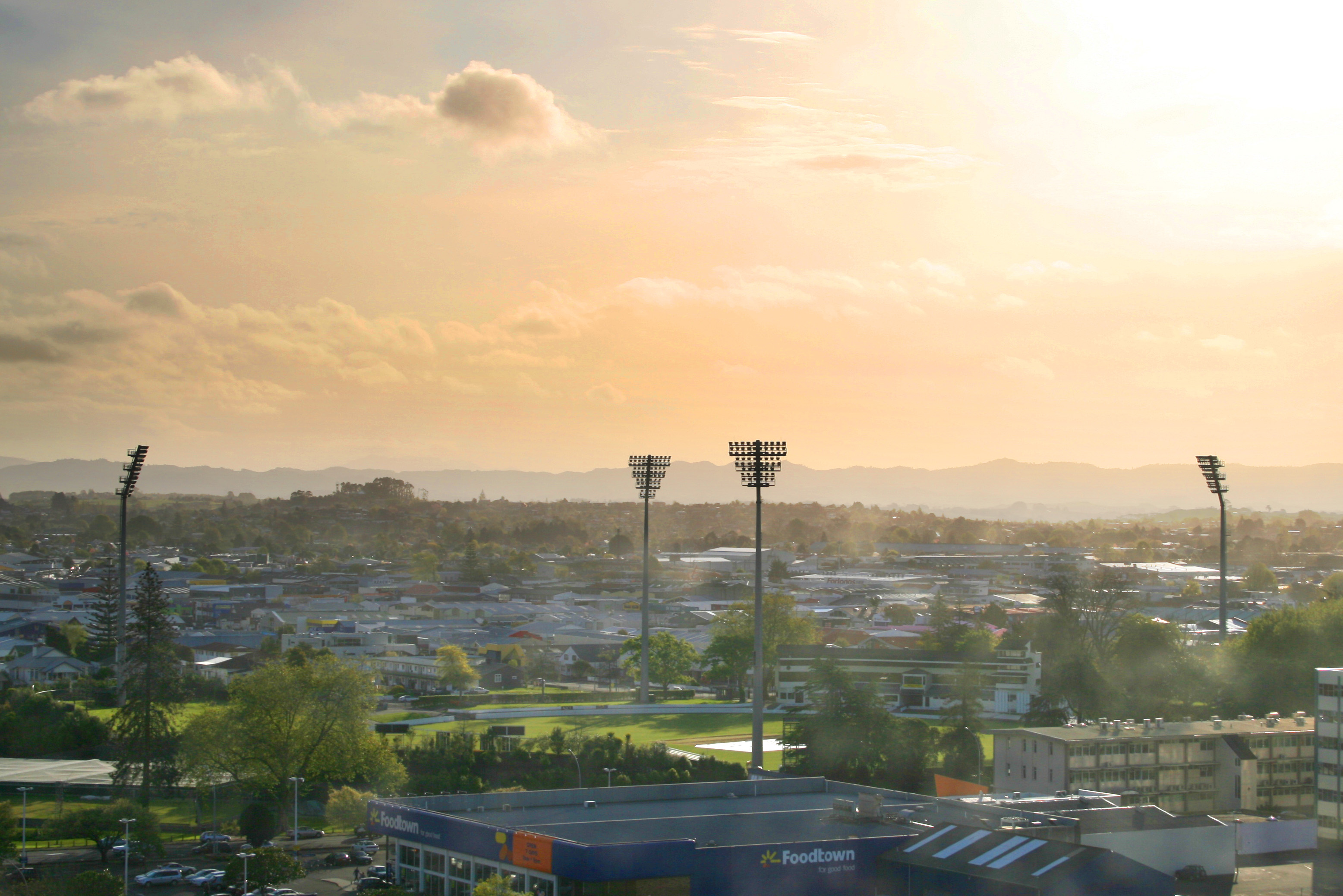
- Interactive map of Seddon Park

Ground information
- Location: Hamilton Central, Hamilton, New Zealand
- Country: New Zealand
- Coordinates: 37°47′12″S 175°16′27″E
- Capacity: 10,000
- Tenants: New Zealand
- Website: seddonpark.com
- End names
- Members End; City End

International information
- First men's Test: 22–26 February 1991: New Zealand v Sri Lanka
- Last men's Test: 14–18 December 2024: New Zealand v England
- First men's ODI: 15 February 1981: New Zealand v India
- Last men's ODI: 22 November 2025: New Zealand v West Indies
- First men's T20I: 28 December 2008: New Zealand v West Indies
- Last men's T20I: 01 November 2026: New Zealand v India
- First women's ODI: 14 January 1982: International XI v England
- Last women's ODI: 7 April 2024: New Zealand v England
- First women's T20I: 19 February 2012: New Zealand v England
- Last women's T20I: 28 March 2021: New Zealand v Australia
- As of 7 April 2024; Source: Cricinfo

Seddon Park is a cricket ground in Hamilton, New Zealand. It is the fourth-largest cricket ground in the country, and is renowned for its "village green" setting, affording a picnic atmosphere for spectators.

== History ==
Seddon Park was named after Richard Seddon the longest-serving prime minister of New Zealand. The Hamilton Borough Council named it in July 1906 before it was developed. It was first used for a major cricket match in February 1914, when the touring Australians played a South Auckland XVIII in a two-day match. It has been in constant use since.

Due to sponsorship from Trust Bank and subsequently Westpac, the ground was known as Trust Bank Park from 1990 to 1997, as WestpacTrust Park from 1997 to 2003, and as Westpac Park from 2003 to 2006. It reverted to its original name in 2006, when Westpac decided to end its sponsorship of a number of sporting events and grounds in New Zealand.

Seddon Park staged one of the matches in the 1992 Cricket World Cup and three matches in the 2015 Cricket World Cup.

Australia played a test match in March 2024 to mark the return to test cricket in Hamilton for the first time since 2020/21.

== Ground ==
Seddon Park is a round, well-grassed ground with a centre block of nine pitches, running approximately north to south. These pitches are usually very good for batting. There is an embankment going around three-quarters of the perimeter, with a tall hedgerow outside this embankment.

In addition to cricket, Seddon Park has been used for rugby union, rugby league and hockey matches. It therefore has a flexible stadium environment that can be modified according to sports events.

== Usage and statistics ==
Seddon Park has been used for first-class cricket since the 1956–57 season, coinciding with the formation of the Northern Districts Cricket Association and the inclusion of the Northern Districts cricket team in the Plunket Shield competition.

The ground is used for hosting Twenty20 International matches, One Day International matches as well as Test matches. It has hosted a total of 9 T20Is, 34 ODIs and 25 Test matches. The first ODI played here was between New Zealand and India on 15 February 1981, which New Zealand won by 57 runs. The first Test match was played on 22–26 February 1991, between New Zealand and Sri Lanka, which was a draw. Kane Williamson has the highest Test score on the ground, 251 versus West Indies in 2020.

The ground was also used for one season in 2001 for the majority of Waikato and Chiefs rugby home games. Temporary stands were raised for the games. Rugby returned to the newly built Waikato Stadium for the following year.

== Cricket World Cups ==
This stadium has hosted One Day International (ODI) matches for all editions of the World cups, when New Zealand was a co-host.

7 March 1992
Scorecard

India; 203/7 (32 overs)	v	Zimbabwe; 104/1 (19.1 overs)
Sachin Tendulkar 81 (77); John Traicos 3/35 (6 overs)		Andy Flower 43 (56); Sachin Tendulkar 1/35 (6 overs)

India won by 55 runs (revised target)
Trust Bank Park, Hamilton, New Zealand
Umpires: Dooland Buultjens and Steve Randell
Player of the match: Sachin Tendulkar (Ind)

- After rain forced the early close of the Indian innings, the target was recalculated to 159 runs in the 19 overs.

ICC World Cup 2015, 1st Match, Group B

15 February 2015 (D/N)
Scorecard

South Africa; 339/4 (50 overs)	v	Zimbabwe; 277 (48.2 overs)

South Africa won by 62 runs
Seddon Park, Hamilton

ICC World Cup 2015, 17th Match, Group B

10 March 2015 (D/N)
Scorecard

Ireland; 259 (49 overs)	v	India; 260/2 (36.5 overs)

India won by 8 wickets
Seddon Park, Hamilton

ICC World Cup 2015, 19th Match, Group A

13 March 2015 (D/N)
Scorecard

Bangladesh; 288/7 (50 overs)	v	New Zealand; 290/7 (48.5 overs)

New Zealand won by 3 wickets
Seddon Park, Hamilton

=== Tests record for ground ===
Highest totals : 715/6d (163 overs) by New Zealand v Bangladesh on 28 Feb 2019
High scores : 251 (412) by Kane Williamson v West Indies on 3 December 2020

== See also ==
- List of Test cricket grounds
