= University of Otago Oval =

Sports ground

- "Varsity Oval"
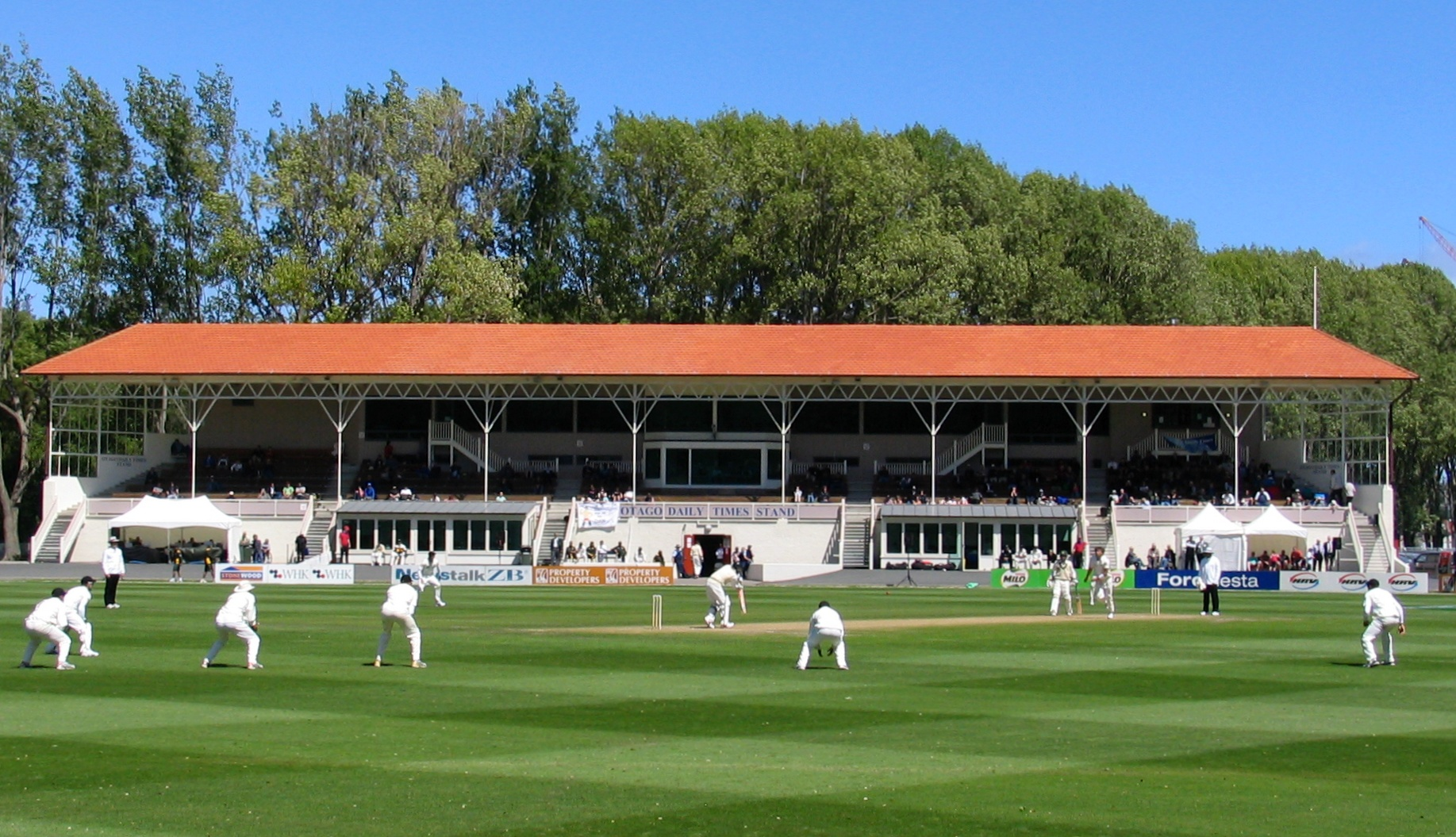
- University of Otago Oval and grandstand, during a Test between New Zealand and Pakistan in 2009
- Interactive map of University of Otago Oval
- Former names: Logan Park Oval
- Location: Dunedin, New Zealand
- Coordinates: 45°51′57″S 170°31′31″E
- Owner: Dunedin City Council
- Capacity: 3500 (can be increased to 6000 by use of temporary seating)
- Surface: Grass

Construction
- Groundbreaking: 1913
- Opened: 1920
- Renovated: 1979
- Expanded: 2004, 2012

Tenants
- Otago Cricket Association; Otago Volts; Otago University Rugby Football Club

Ground information
- End names
- Southern End; Northern End

International information
- First men's Test: 4–6 January 2008: New Zealand v Bangladesh
- Last men's Test: 8–12 March 2017: New Zealand v South Africa
- First men's ODI: 8 February 2010: New Zealand v Bangladesh
- Last men's ODI: 17 December 2023: New Zealand v Bangladesh
- First men's T20I: 25 February 2021: New Zealand v Australia
- Last men's T20I: 18 March 2025: New Zealand v Pakistan
- First women's ODI: 26 February 2021: New Zealand v England
- Last women's ODI: 9 March 2022: England v West Indies
- First women's T20I: 4 December 2022: New Zealand v Bangladesh
- Last women's T20I: 19 March 2024: New Zealand v England
- As of 19 March 2024; Source: Cricinfo

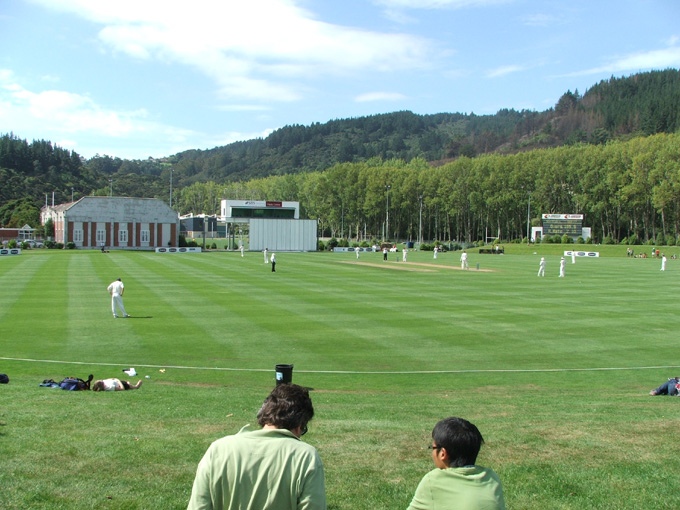
Otago host Northern Districts at the University of Otago Oval in February 2007.

The University of Otago Oval is a sports ground located at Logan Park, Dunedin, New Zealand, and owned by the Dunedin City Council. It was opened by Sir Louis Barnett on 5 April 1930. The ground was originally owned by the University of Otago, but ownership was transferred to the city council when a redevelopment was completed in the early 2000s.

The ground is the home of both the Otago Cricket Association and the University of Otago Rugby Football Club, and is also used as a training base for the Highlanders Rugby Football team. The University of Otago Oval hosted the first game where the Umpire Decision Review System was officially used, after a test run in Sri Lanka in 2008.

The University Oval twice played host to touring international rugby league teams. In 1953, the touring Australians defeated the South Island rugby league team 66–9 in front of 2,956 fans, while the next year the oval saw the touring Great Britain Lions defeat the South Island team 32–11 in front of 1,154 fans.

== Facilities ==
A media complex, which consists of television and radio commentary rooms, is situated at the northern end of the ground. Additional boxes were attached to the media building. Television cameras are situated at the top of the media complex and on a permanent structure at the other end of the ground. A historic grandstand is located at the southern end of the ground, and an electronic scoreboard on the north-eastern side.

The grandstand complex includes changing rooms, members' rooms, lounges and bars, players' viewing areas, a medical room, kitchens, offices, umpires' rooms, a canteen and shop, media rooms and storage rooms. A building attached to the rear hosts the University Rugby Club.

== International Cricket ==
Three of the Pool A games in the 2015 ODI Cricket World Cup were played in the University Oval.

=== Test cricket ===
The University of Otago Oval is the southernmost cricket ground in the world which has hosted a test match. A total of eight test matches were played in this ground.

==== First Test ====
The University of Otago Oval became New Zealand's seventh test ground when it hosted its first test match on 4 January 2008, between New Zealand and Bangladesh. This was Dunedin's first Test match for ten years. NZ$6 million was spent refurbishing the University of Otago Oval and it has now replaced Carisbrook as Dunedin's test-cricket venue.

Just one month prior to the Test match, a State Championship match between Auckland and Otago, which was scheduled to last four days, ended in less than two due to an under-prepared pitch. Auckland scored 94 and 128 and Otago 170 and 54 for 4. Auckland Coach, Mark O'Donnell, had this to say about the pitch:

It was an unmitigated cock-up and a disgraceful wicket. I've been five times to [University Oval] in the last five years and on each occasion it's been substandard. They just haven't got it right. If you'd put a test attack on that surface you'd probably have killed someone once the divots dried out.

O'Donnell also said that those claiming that the pitch was not at fault and that poor batting had played a large part in proceedings were "deluding themselves".

As a result, New Zealand Cricket sent its chief turf assessor, Jarrod Carter, to Dunedin to help the local groundsman, Tom Tamati, prepare the test pitch. Although the University Oval's first test finished inside three days that was largely attributed to poor batting by most of the Bangladeshis rather than to the nature of the pitch: New Zealand scored 357 and the Bangladeshi openers had a 161-run partnership in the second innings. After the match Daniel Vettori, New Zealand's captain, said:

Everything about the whole setup was fantastic, apart from the size of the boundaries. It was a little bit farcical. They were just too small. If you bowled to [Australian batsmen] Matthew Hayden or Adam Gilchrist it would be a tough day as a spinner. Aside from that, if they can sort it out I couldn't rate it higher. It can be one of the premier test venues.

==== Second Test ====
From 11 to 15 December 2008, New Zealand played the West Indies at the University of Otago Oval. The match was ruined by rain. The ground's drainage and the ability of the ground staff to cope with rain were criticized.

Dylan Cleaver, writing in The New Zealand Herald under the headline "Dunedin not fit to stage a test" stated:

At Brisbane, it rained so hard the Gabba was reduced to a lake. The next morning, play started on time at 10am. Yesterday, despite there being nary a spittle of rain since the previous evening, a ball was not delivered until 2.45pm. That borders on farcical. Until such time as the Otago Cricket Association or New Zealand Cricket invests in a decent drainage system and super-soppers, the University Oval should not host another test.

Dylan further described the University Oval as a "club ground".

Ross Dykes, the Otago Cricket Association chief executive, said the article was insulting to Dunedin, the University Oval and the groundstaff. He confirmed the ground had drainage problems, because it had been built on reclaimed land, but rejected criticism of New Zealand Cricket or the ground staff:

We had a huge amount of rainfall and I think we probably did everything we could. ... It has to be appreciated that this ground is the old Pelichet Bay, so it is reclaimed land. ... When you get that amount of rainfall, you get to a point where you can clear off the surface moisture but by trying to get more out you only end up dragging more up.

==== Third Test ====
The University of Otago Oval hosted its third Test match from 24 to 28 November 2009, against Pakistan. Play was briefly interrupted by rain on the second day, and bad light plagued several of the evening sessions, but the problems of the previous Tests did not emerge. The match proved to be a cliffhanger, with a win to either side, a draw or even a tie still possible as the fifth day entered its final session. New Zealand eventually won by 32 runs, taking Pakistan's last five wickets for 54 runs in the final session of day five. The Test was hailed by some as the test of the year, notably by Sambit Bal writing for Cricinfo:

Dunedin provided almost everything. The drama. The twists. The contest between bat and ball. Swing and seam and pace. Stirring batting. Wickets falling in a heap and then the batsmen fighting back. ... Easily it was the best Test of the year: if it failed to move you, cricket will never be your game.

==== Fourth Test ====
The fourth Test match played at the University of Otago Oval saw New Zealand face South Africa from 7 to 11 March 2012. The two sides were evenly matched, with New Zealand gaining a slender first innings lead of 35 runs, scoring 273 to South Africa's 238. However, the Proteas rallied in their second innings, scoring 435-5d. with captain Graeme Smith, Jacques Kallis and Jacques Rudolph all scoring centuries. Chasing a target of 401 to win, New Zealand reached 137/2 at close of play on day 4, setting up a tantalising end to the Test match. However, no play was possible on the final day due to rain, and the match ended in a draw.

==== Fifth Test ====
The fifth Test match at the University of Otago Oval was contested between New Zealand and England from 6 to 10 March 2013. It was the first test in a three match series. New Zealand captain Brendon McCullum won the toss and elected to bowl, however there was no play on Day 1 due to rain. A poor batting display from England saw them dismissed for 167 on Day 2, with Neil Wagner and left-arm spinner Bruce Martin (on debut) each taking 4 wickets for New Zealand. New Zealand then racked up a huge lead, declaring at 460 for 9. Debutant opener Hamish Rutherford scored an aggressive 171 and Brendon McCullum struck 74 from 59 deliveries, while James Anderson took 4 wickets for England. The English then went into survival mode and managed to hold on for a draw, scoring 421 for 6 by the close of play on Day 5. England's opening pair of Alastair Cook and Nick Compton each scored centuries, while nightwatchman Steven Finn batted for almost 5 hours to score 56, his maiden test 50.

Crowd attendance was 22,188 for the match, including the rained-out first day.

==== Sixth Test ====
The sixth test match at the University of Otago Oval was contested between New Zealand and the West Indies from 3 to 7 December 2013. West Indies won the toss and chose to bowl first. A classy batting display from Ross Taylor and Brendon McCullum propped up New Zealand's first innings. Taylor scored his maiden double century and was unbeaten on 217 when New Zealand declared for 609 for 9. West Indies was bowled out in the first innings for 213 and was forced to follow on but Darren Bravo scored his maiden double century in reply which led them to a safe score of 507. Chasing a target of 112 on day 5, New Zealand's top order crumbled against West Indian spinner Shane Shillingford and they were reduced to 44 for 4 but was lifted up by Taylor and Corey Anderson to 79 for 4, 33 runs away from victory before rain forced an early draw.

==== Seventh Test ====
The seventh Test match at the University of Otago Oval was contested between New Zealand and Sri Lanka in December 2015. New Zealand won by 122 runs.

==== Eighth Test ====
The eighth Test match at the ground was contested between New Zealand and South Africa in March 2017. The match was drawn after rain prevented play on the fifth day.

== List of international five-wicket hauls ==
Six international five-wicket hauls have been taken at University of Otago Oval, three in Test matches, two in ODIs and one in a Twenty20 International.

=== Test matches ===
Five-wicket hauls in Men's Test matches at University Oval
No.	Bowler	Date	Team	Opposing Team	Inn	O	R	W	Result
1	Daniel Vettori	11 December 2008	New Zealand	West Indies	2	25	56	6	Drawn
2	Shane Bond	24 November 2009	New Zealand	Pakistan	2	27.5	107	5	New Zealand won
3	Keshav Maharaj	8 March 2017	South Africa	New Zealand	2	28.3	97	5	Drawn

=== One Day Internationals ===
Five-wicket hauls in Men's One Day International matches at University Oval
No.	Bowler	Date	Team	Opposing Team	Inn	O	R	W	Result
1	Trent Boult	13 January 2018	New Zealand	Pakistan	2	7.2	17	5	New Zealand won
2	Tim Southee	20 February 2019	New Zealand	Bangladesh	2	9.2	65	6	New Zealand won

=== Twenty20 Internationals ===
Five-wicket hauls in Men's Twenty20 International matches at University Oval
No.	Bowler	Date	Team	Opposing Team	Inn	O	R	W	Result
1	Adam Milne	5 April 2023	New Zealand	Sri Lanka	1	4	26	5	New Zealand won

== See also ==
- List of Test cricket grounds
