= Ian Gould =

Cricket umpire

Ian James Gould
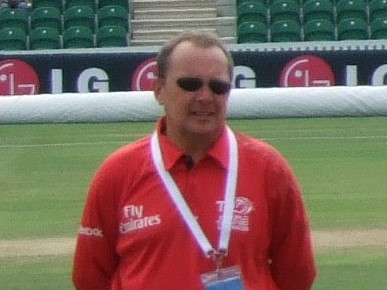

Personal information
- Full name: Ian James Gould
- Born: 19 August 1957 (age 69); Taplow, Buckinghamshire, England
- Nickname: Gunner
- Batting: Left-handed
- Role: Wicket-keeper

International information
- National side: England
- ODI debut (cap 69): 15 January 1983 v New Zealand
- Last ODI: 22 June 1983 v India

Domestic team information
- Years: Team
- 1975–1980: Middlesex
- 1979/80: Auckland
- 1981–1991: Sussex
- 1996: Middlesex

Umpiring information
- Tests umpired: 74 (2008–2019)
- ODIs umpired: 141 (2006–2019)
- T20Is umpired: 37 (2006–2016)
- WODIs umpired: 2 (2008–2013)
- WT20Is umpired: 4 (2009–2014)

Career statistics
Competition	ODIs	FC	LA
Matches	18	298	315
Runs scored	155	8,756	4,377
Batting average	12.91	26.05	19.11
100s/50s	0/0	4/47	0/20
Top score	42	128	88
Balls bowled	–	478	20
Wickets	–	7	1
Bowling average	–	52.14	16.00
5 wickets in innings	–	0	0
10 wickets in match	–	0	0
Best bowling	–	3/10	1/0
Catches/stumpings	15/3	536/67	242/37
- Source: Cricinfo, 6 July 2019

Ian James Gould (born 19 August 1957) is an English former first-class cricketer and a former member of the ICC Elite Panel of cricket umpires. He previously also served as the chairman of English football club Burnham FC. In April 2019, Gould announced that he would retire as an umpire following the 2019 Cricket World Cup. On 6 July 2019, Gould retired from umpiring, after officiating in the World Cup match between India and Sri Lanka. However, he has since umpired in matches in the 2020 Under-19 Cricket World Cup.

== Playing career ==
Gould represented Middlesex (1975–1980 and 1996), Sussex (1981–1991) and Auckland in 1979/80 as a left-handed batsman and wicketkeeper. He captained Sussex in 1987. He returned to Middlesex as a county coach between 1991 and 2000.

Gould toured the West Indies with the England Young Cricketers in 1976. He played 18 One Day Internationals for England in 1983, including that year's World Cup as a wicket-keeper. Wicket-keeper Bob Taylor represented England in Test matches during 1983.

Gould also played cricket in Devon, where he represented Budleigh Salterton and Exmouth but struggled to find form on the slower wickets in the South West.

His son Michael Gould has played cricket for Sussex Second XI.

== Umpiring career ==
As an umpire, Gould was appointed to stand in 3 matches of the 2007 Cricket World Cup in the Caribbean. He umpired his first Test match – between South Africa v Bangladesh at Bloemfontein, 19–22 November 2008. Gould was promoted to the ICC Elite Panel of Umpires in 2009. He stood in the high voltage India vs Pakistan semi-final at Mohali in the 2011 Cricket World Cup. He was selected as one of the twenty umpires to stand in matches during the 2015 Cricket World Cup. He stood in his 100th ODI match during the World Cup, for the Australia v Sri Lanka game in Pool A. He stood in his 50th Test when he umpired the match between West Indies and India at Sir Vivian Richards Stadium in North Sound, Antigua from 21–25 July 2016.

In April 2019, he was named as one of the sixteen umpires to stand in matches during the 2019 Cricket World Cup. On 6 July 2019, he retired as an umpire, after standing in his 140th ODI match. However, in January 2020, he was named as one of the sixteen umpires for the 2020 Under-19 Cricket World Cup tournament in South Africa.

== Football ==
Gould played football as a goalkeeper representing Slough Town and Arsenal, thus earning himself the nickname "Gunner". Gould's passion for football was reaffirmed in July 2009 when he took over as chairman of Southern Football League club Burnham. In a press briefing, Gould confirmed to reporters that he was in it for the long haul, with the objective of pushing the Club towards Conference League football. More importantly, Gould is intent on developing the corporate side of the Burnham brand and conference centre facilities.

== See also ==
- List of Test cricket umpires
- List of One Day International cricket umpires
- List of Twenty20 International cricket umpires

Sporting positions
Preceded by John Barclay	Sussex county cricket captain 1987	Succeeded by Paul Parker
