= Cricket World Cup records =

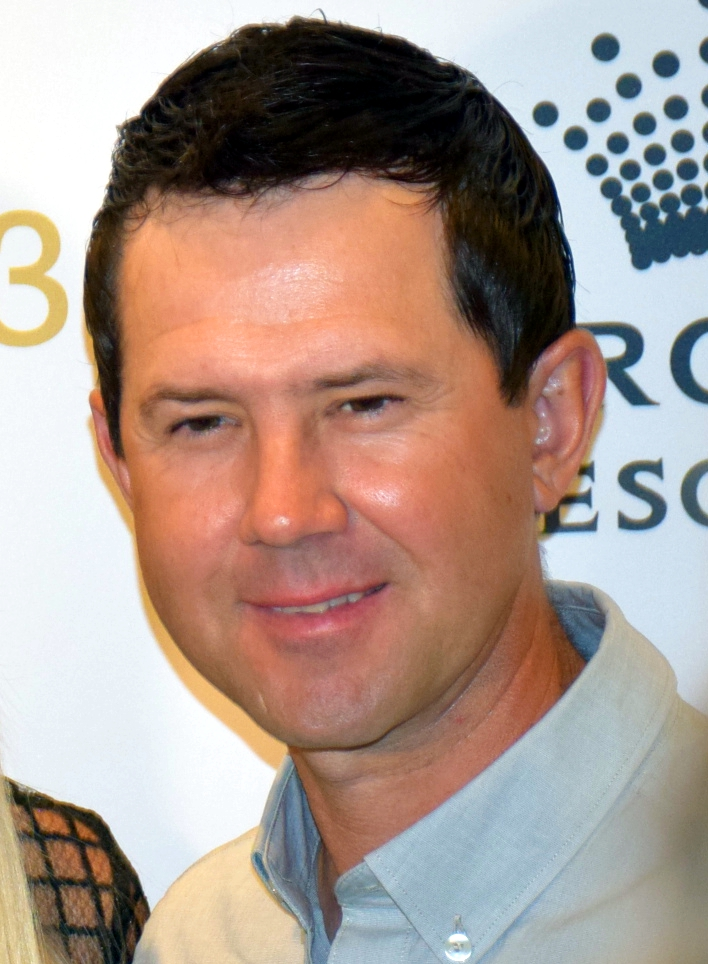
Former Australian captain Ricky Ponting (pictured) holds several Cricket World Cup records.

The Cricket World Cup is the international championship of One Day International (ODI) cricket. The event is organised by the sport's governing body, the International Cricket Council (ICC), and is held once every four years. ODI cricket is one of three forms of cricket played at international level. Unlike Test cricket, ODIs consist of one innings per team and is played over the course of single day. Australia and England played in the inaugural ODI match on 5 January 1971 at the Melbourne Cricket Ground. The inaugural Cricket World Cup took place in England in 1975 and 12 tournaments have been held since. The first three editions were all held in England and each innings was limited to a maximum of 60 overs. Since the 1987 Cricket World Cup, all matches have consisted of 50 overs per innings.

Top order batsman and former Australian captain Ricky Ponting holds several World Cup records. Playing in five tournaments between 1996 and 2011, he has played in more World Cup matches than any player with 46. He also holds the record for the most consecutive matches played. As a slip fielder, Ponting has also taken the most catches at the World Cup with 28. Captaining his side from 2003 to 2011, Ponting holds the World Cup record for the most matches played as captain with 29. India batsman Sachin Tendulkar has scored 2,278 runs making him the only player to score more than 2,000 runs at the World Cup. He has also scored the most World Cup half-centuries with 15 and shares the record with Pakistan's Javed Miandad for the most number of World Cup tournaments played with 6.

Australian fast bowler Glenn McGrath holds the record for the most World Cup wickets taken with 71, the record for the best figures taken in an World Cup with 7/15 and has the best bowling average at the Cricket World Cup with 18.19. (Note: Of all the bowlers who have bowled at least 800 balls at the Cricket World Cup) Sri Lanka's Kumar Sangakkara is the record holder for the most number dismissals and stumpings taken as a wicket-keeper at the World Cup with 54 and 13, respectively. The World Cup record for most catches as a wicket-keeper is held by Australian gloveman Adam Gilchrist with 45. Gilchrist and New Zealand's Tom Latham holds the record for the most dismissals in a single tournament by a designated wicket-keeper with 21.

== Key ==
The top five records are listed for each category, except for the team wins, losses, ties and no results and the partnership records. Tied records for fifth place are also included. Explanations of the general symbols and cricketing terms used in the list are given below. Specific details are provided in each category where appropriate. All records are correct as of the 2023 Cricket World Cup.

Key
Symbol	Meaning
*	Player remained not out or partnership remained unbroken
♠	One Day International cricket record
Date	Date of the World Cup match
Innings	Number of World Cup innings played
Matches	Number of World Cup matches played
Opposition	The team that, the team or the team of the player who scored the record, was played against
Period	The time period when the player played in the World Cup
Player	The player who scored the record
Team	The team or the team of the player who scored the record
Venue	One Day International cricket ground where the World Cup match was played

== Team records ==
=== Team wins, losses, ties and no results ===
A total of 20 of the 29 ODI teams have played in at least one edition of the Cricket World Cup. The teams that have not played are the Africa XI, the ACC Asia XI, Hong Kong, the ICC World XI, Jersey, Nepal, Oman, Papua New Guinea and the United States. Six teams have played in all thirteen editions of the Cricket World Cup—Australia, England, India, New Zealand, Pakistan and Sri Lanka. The West Indies, who had played in every World Cup since the inaugural tournament in 1975, failed to qualify for the 2023 edition. Australia has played and won the most matches at the Cricket World Cup and has the highest winning percentage.

Team wins, losses, ties and no results
Team	Span	Matches	Won	Lost	Tied	No result	% Won
Afghanistan	2015–2023	24	5	19	0	0	20.83
Australia	1975–2023	105	78	25	1	1	74.28
Bangladesh	1999–2023	49	16	32	0	1	32.65
Bermuda	2007–2007	3	0	3	0	0	0.00
Canada	1979–2011	18	2	16	0	0	11.11
East Africa	1975–1975	3	0	3	0	0	0.00
England	1975–2023	92	51	38	2	1	55.43
India	1975–2023	95	63	30	1	1	66.31
Ireland	2007–2015	21	7	13	1	0	33.33
Kenya	1996–2011	29	6	22	0	1	20.68
Namibia	2003–2003	6	0	6	0	0	0.00
Netherlands	1996–2023	29	4	25	0	0	13.79
New Zealand	1975–2023	99	59	38	1	1	59.59
Pakistan	1975–2023	88	49	37	0	2	55.68
Scotland	1999–2015	14	0	14	0	0	0.00
South Africa	1992–2023	74	45	26	2	1	60.81
Sri Lanka	1975–2023	89	40	46	1	2	44.94
United Arab Emirates	1996–2015	11	1	10	0	0	9.09
West Indies	1975–2019	80	43	35	0	2	53.75
Zimbabwe	1983–2015	57	11	42	1	3	19.29
Last updated: 19 November 2023

=== Team scoring records ===
==== Highest totals ====
The highest innings total scored at the Cricket World Cup came in the group stage match between South Africa and Sri Lanka at the most recent edition in 2023. Playing at the Arun Jaitley Cricket Stadium in Delhi, South Africa posted a total of 428/5. This broke the record of 417/6 set by Australia at WACA Ground in Perth against Afghanistan at the 2015 tournament. The third match of Group B in the 2007 World Cup saw India becoming the first team to break the 400-run barrier in a single innings at the World Cup. Playing against Bermuda at the Queen's Park Oval in the Port of Spain, India posted a score of 413/5. The 400-run mark has been passed on four other occasions in the World Cup.

Highest totals
Rank	Score	Overs	Team	Opposition	Venue	Date
1	428/5	50	South Africa	Sri Lanka	Arun Jaitley Cricket Stadium, Delhi, India	7 October 2023
2	417/6	50	Australia	Afghanistan	WACA Ground, Perth, Australia	4 March 2015
3	413/5	50	India	Bermuda	Queen's Park Oval, Port of Spain, Trinidad and Tobago	19 March 2007
4	411/4	50	South Africa	Ireland	Manuka Oval, Canberra, Australia	3 March 2015
5	410/4	50	India	Netherlands	M. Chinnaswamy Stadium, Bangalore, India	12 November 2023
Last updated: 19 November 2023

==== Highest successful run chases ====
Pakistan claimed the highest successful run chase in Cricket World Cup history when they scored 345/4 chasing a target of 345 runs. This came during their group stage match against Sri Lanka at 2023 World Cup at the Rajiv Gandhi International Cricket Stadium in Hyderabad. This bettered the previous record set at the 2011 World Cup where England set 328 runs for victory and Ireland reached the target with 5 balls to spare at the M. Chinnaswamy Stadium in Bangalore.

Highest successful run chases
Rank	Score	Target	Overs	Team	Opposition	Venue	Date
1	345/4	345	48.2	Pakistan	Sri Lanka	Rajiv Gandhi International Cricket Stadium, Hyderabad, India	10 October 2023
2	329/7	328	49.1	Ireland	England	M. Chinnaswamy Stadium, Bengaluru, India	2 March 2011
3	322/3	322	41.3	Bangladesh	West Indies	County Ground, Taunton, England	17 June 2019
4	322/4	319	48.1	Bangladesh	Scotland	Saxton Oval, Nelson, New Zealand	5 March 2015
5	313/7	313	49.2	Sri Lanka	Zimbabwe	Pukekura Park, New Plymouth, New Zealand	23 February 1992
Last updated: 19 November 2023

==== Lowest totals ====
The lowest innings total scored in World Cup came in the 2003 Pool B match at Boland Park in Paarl where Canada was bowled out by Sri Lanka for 36 runs. This broke the long-standing record of 45 runs set at the 1979 World Cup where Canada was dismissed by tournament hosts England at Old Trafford. Both of these were ODI record scores at the time they were scored.

Lowest totals
Rank	Score	Overs	Team	Opposition	Venue	Date
1	36	18.4	Canada	Sri Lanka	Boland Park, Paarl, South Africa	19 February 2003
2	45	40.3	Canada	England	Old Trafford, Manchester, England	13 June 1979 (Note: The reserve day of 14 June 1979 was used for this match as rain prevented any play on 13 June 1979.)
2	45	14.0	Namibia	Australia	North West Cricket Stadium, Potchefstroom, South Africa	27 February 2003
4	55	19.4	Sri Lanka	India	Wankhede Stadium, Mumbai, India	2 November 2023
5	58	18.5	Bangladesh	West Indies	Sher-e-Bangla National Cricket Stadium, Dhaka, Bangladesh	4 March 2011
Last updated: 19 November 2023

==== Lowest totals successfully defended ====
Zimbabwe claimed the record of lowest total successfully defended in a completed World Cup match when they defended 134 in a 1992 Group Stage match at Lavington Sports Oval in Albury by bowling out England for 125.

Rank	Score	Opposition Score	Team	Opposition	Venue	Date
1	134	125	Zimbabwe	England	Lavington Sports Oval, Albury, Australia	18 March 1992
2	165/9	151	England	Pakistan	Headingley Cricket Ground, Leeds, England	16 June 1979
3	166	93	Kenya	West Indies	Nehru Stadium, Pune, India	29 February 1996
4	171	165	England	South Africa	M. A. Chidambaram Stadium, Chennai, India	6 March 2011
5	180	120	Canada	Bangladesh	Kingsmead Cricket Ground, Durban, South Africa	11 February 2003
Last updated: 19 November 2023

==== Highest match aggregates ====
The highest match aggregate in a World Cup match came in the 2023 Cricket World Cup group stage match at HPCA Stadium in Dharamshala where Australia and New Zealand combined to score 771 runs in the match. This broke the record of 754 runs set 21 days earlier in the same World Cup, between South Arica and Sri Lanka.

Highest match aggregates
Rank	Aggregate	Team 1	Team 2	Venue	Date
1	771/19	Australia (388)	New Zealand (383/9)	HPCA Stadium, Dharamshala, India	28 October 2023
2	754/15	South Africa (428/5)	Sri Lanka (326)	Arun Jaitley Stadium, Delhi, India	7 October 2023
3	724/14	India (397/4)	New Zealand (327)	Wankhede Stadium, Mumbai, India	15 November 2023
4	714/13	Australia (381/5)	Bangladesh (333/8)	Trent Bridge, Nottingham, England	20 June 2019
5	689/13	Sri Lanka (344/9)	Pakistan (345/4)	Rajiv Gandhi International Cricket Stadium, Hyderabad, India	23 October 2023
Last updated: 19 November 2023

==== Lowest match aggregates ====
The lowest match aggregate in a completed World Cup match came in the 2003 Cricket World Cup group stage match at Boland Park in Paarl where Canada and Sri Lanka combined to score 73 runs in the match.

Lowest match aggregates
Rank	Aggregate	Team 1	Team 2	Venue	Date
1	73/11	Canada (36)	Sri Lanka (37/1)	Boland Park, Paarl, South Africa	19 February 2003
2	91/12	Canada (45)	England (46/2)	Old Trafford Cricket Ground, Manchester, England	13 June 1979
3	117/11	Bangladesh (58)	West Indies (59/1)	Sher-e-Bangla National Cricket Stadium, Dhaka, Bangladesh	4 March 2011
4	138/12	Scotland (68)	West Indies (70/2)	Grace Road, Leicester, England	27 May 1999
5	141/10	Kenya (69)	New Zealand (72/0)	M. A. Chidambaram Stadium, Chennai, India	20 February 2011
Last updated: 19 November 2023

=== Result records ===
An ODI match is won when one side has scored more runs than the total runs scored by the opposing side during their innings. If both sides have completed their allocated innings and the side that fielded last has the higher number of runs, it is known as a win by runs. This indicates the number of runs that they had scored more than the opposing side. If the side batting last wins the match, it is known as a win by wickets, indicating the number of wickets that were still to fall.

==== Greatest win margins (by runs) ====
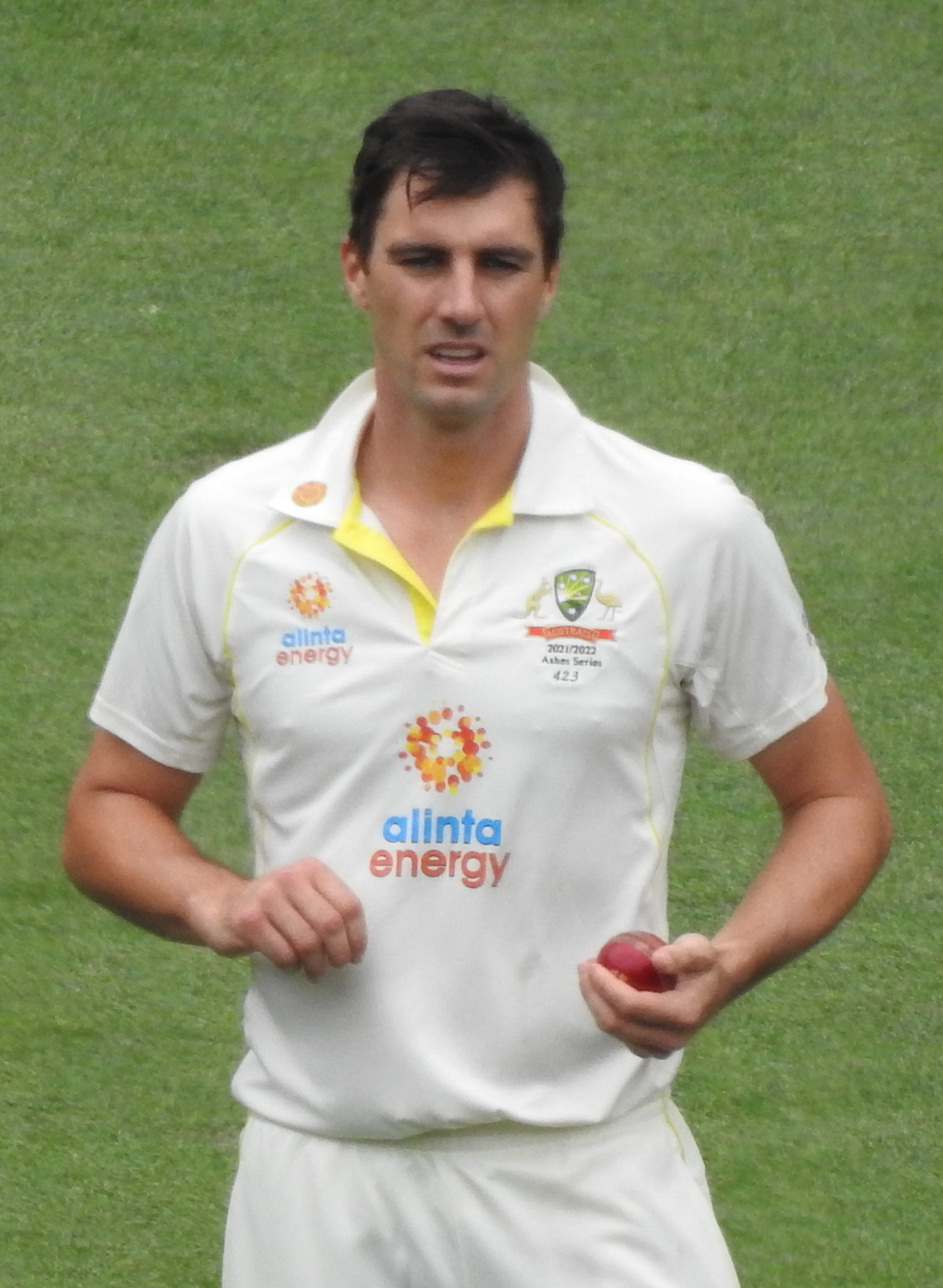
Pat Cummins (pictured) was the captain of the Australian team that defeated the Netherlands at the 2023 tournament by 309 runs, the largest margin of victory by runs at the Cricket World Cup.

The greatest winning margin by runs at the World Cup was Australia's victory over the Netherlands at the Arun Jaitley Cricket Stadium in Delhi at the most recently edition in 2023 where Australia won by a margin of 309 runs. This is followed by India's 302-run victory over Sri Lanka at the same tournament eight days later. Both of these eclipsed the previous record of Australia's defeat of Afghanistan during the 2015 World Cup by 275 runs.

Greatest win margins (by runs)
Rank	Margin	Team	Opposition	Venue	Date
1	309 runs	Australia	Netherlands	Arun Jaitley Cricket Stadium, Delhi, India	25 October 2023
2	302 runs	India	Sri Lanka	Wankhede Stadium, Mumbai, India	2 November 2023
3	275 runs	Australia	Afghanistan	WACA Ground, Perth, Australia	4 March 2015
4	257 runs	India	Bermuda	Queen's Park Oval, Port of Spain, Trinidad and Tobago	19 March 2007
4	257 runs	South Africa	West Indies	Sydney Cricket Ground, Sydney, Australia	27 February 2015
Last updated: 19 November 2023

==== Greatest win margins (by 10 wickets) ====
Cricket World Cup matches have been won by a margin of 10 wickets on 12 occasions, the most recent being New Zealand's defeat of Sri Lanka in 2019.

Greatest win margins (by 10 wickets)
Rank	Margin	Team	Opposition	Venue	Date
=1	10 wickets	India	East Africa	Headingley, Leeds, England	11 June 1975
=1	10 wickets	West Indies	Zimbabwe	Edgbaston, Birmingham, England	20 June 1983
=1	10 wickets	West Indies	Pakistan	Melbourne Cricket Ground, Melbourne, Australia	23 February 1992
=1	10 wickets	South Africa	Kenya	North West Cricket Stadium, Potchefstroom, South Africa	12 February 2003
=1	10 wickets	Sri Lanka	Bangladesh	City Oval, Pietermaritzburg, South Africa	14 February 2003
=1	10 wickets	South Africa	Bangladesh	Mangaung Oval, Bloemfontein, South Africa	22 February 2003
=1	10 wickets	Australia	Bangladesh	Sir Vivian Richards Stadium, Saint George, Antigua and Barbuda	31 March 2007
=1	10 wickets	New Zealand	Kenya	M. A. Chidambaram Stadium, Chennai, India	20 February 2011
=1	10 wickets	New Zealand	Zimbabwe	Sardar Patel Stadium, Ahmedabad, India	4 March 2011
=1	10 wickets	Pakistan	West Indies	Sher-e-Bangla National Cricket Stadium, Dhaka, Bangladesh	23 March 2011
=1	10 wickets	Sri Lanka	England	R. Premadasa Stadium, Colombo, Sri Lanka	26 March 2011
=1	10 wickets	New Zealand	Sri Lanka	Sophia Gardens, Cardiff, Wales	1 June 2019
Last updated: 19 November 2023

==== Greatest win margins (by balls remaining) ====
The group stage of the 1979 World Cup saw England run down the target of 46 runs to defeat Canada by a margin of 8 wickets with 277 balls remaining in the 60-over innings, the largest victory by balls remaining in ODI cricket history. The next largest victory at the Cricket World Cup was Sri Lanka's win against Canada at the 2003 tournament at Boland Park in Paarl, where Sri Lanka reached the target of 37 runs with 272 balls to spare.

Greatest win margins (by balls remaining)
Rank	Balls remaining	Margin	Target	Team	Opposition	Venue	Date
1	277 ♠ (Note: This match was played with 60 overs per innings.)	8 wickets	46	England	Canada	Old Trafford, Manchester, England	13 June 1979
2	272	9 wickets	37	Sri Lanka	Canada	Boland Park, Paarl, South Africa	19 February 2003
3	252	10 wickets	70	New Zealand	Kenya	M. A. Chidambaram Stadium, Chennai, India	20 February 2011
4	240	8 wickets	78	Sri Lanka	Ireland	Queen's Park, St. George's, Grenada	18 April 2007
5	239	8 wickets	69	West Indies	Scotland	Grace Road, Leicester, England	27 May 1999
Last updated: 19 November 2023

==== Narrowest win margins (by runs) ====
Thirty-five ODI matches have been won by a margin of one run with two of them occurring at the Cricket World Cup. Both of these matches resulted in Australia defeating India. The first took place in the opening match of Pool A of the 1987 World Cup. The match was played at the M. A. Chidambaram Stadium, the same venue where the same two teams played out second tied Test a year earlier. The victory to Australia came on the second last ball of the match where Steve Waugh bowled Maninder Singh. The second match was four and a half years later at the 1992 World Cup where Australia was the hosting tournament. Played at the Gabba in Brisbane, this was the third match for both teams in group stage. The final ball of the rain-affected second innings saw Steve Waugh run out Venkatapathy Raju to secure the win for the hosts.

Narrowest win margins (by runs)
Rank	Margin	Team	Opposition	Venue	Date
1	1 run ♠	Australia	India	M. A. Chidambaram Stadium, Madras, India	9 October 1987
1	1 run ♠	Australia	India	The Gabba, Brisbane, Australia	1 March 1992
3	2 runs	Sri Lanka	England	Sir Vivian Richards Stadium, Saint George, Antigua and Barbuda	4 April 2007
4	3 runs	New Zealand	Zimbabwe	Lal Bahadur Shastri Stadium, Hyderabad, India	10 October 1987
4	3 runs	Australia	New Zealand	Nehru Stadium, Indore, India	18 October 1987
4	3 runs	Zimbabwe	India	Grace Road, Leicester, England	19 May 1999
4	3 runs	West Indies	South Africa	Newlands Cricket Ground, Cape Town, South Africa	9 February 2003
Last updated: 19 November 2023

==== Narrowest win margins (by 1 wicket) ====
Seventy ODI matches have been won by a margin of one wicket with seven of them occurring at the Cricket World Cup. The most recent occurred in 2023 at the M. A. Chidambaram Stadium in Chennai. Pakistan were bowled all out for 270 inside of 47 overs. In reply, South Africa made 206/4 before losing 46/5. However, tailender Keshav Maharaj struck the winning runs for the Proteas off the bowling of Mohammad Nawaz with 16 balls remaining.

Narrowest win margins (by 1 wicket)
Rank	Margin	Team	Opposition	Venue	Date
=1	1 wicket ♠	West Indies	Pakistan	Edgbaston, Birmingham, England	11 June 1975
=1	1 wicket ♠	Pakistan	West Indies	Gaddafi Stadium, Lahore, Pakistan	16 October 1987
=1	1 wicket ♠	South Africa	Sri Lanka	Providence Stadium, Providence, Guyana	28 March 2007
=1	1 wicket ♠	England	West Indies	Kensington Oval, Bridgetown, Barbados	21 April 2007
=1	1 wicket ♠	Afghanistan	Scotland	University of Otago Oval, Dunedin, New Zealand	26 February 2015
=1	1 wicket ♠	New Zealand	Australia	Eden Park, Auckland, New Zealand	28 February 2015
=1	1 wicket ♠	South Africa	Pakistan	M. A. Chidambaram Stadium, Chennai, India	27 October 2023
Last updated: 19 November 2023

==== Narrowest win margins (by balls remaining) ====
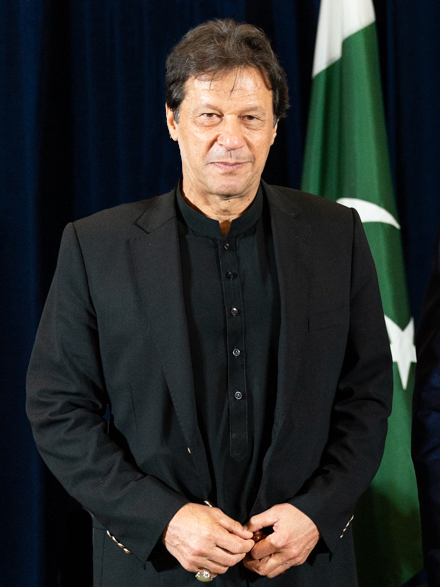
Imran Khan (pictured in 2019) was the captain of the Pakistani team that secured victory in the group stage clash against the West Indies at the 1987 Cricket World Cup on the final ball of the match, the only World Cup match where this has occurred.

Forty ODI matches have been won on the final ball of the match with one of them occurring at the Cricket World Cup. The fifth match of Group B in the 1987 edition saw co-hosts Pakistan play the two-time champions the West Indies at Gaddafi Stadium in Lahore. The West Indies posted a total of 216 in the first innings, getting bowled out in the final over. In reply, Pakistan required 14 runs from the final 6 balls with 1 wicket in hand. At the crease were Abdul Qadir and Saleem Jaffar. They each score a single, followed by a two, a six and a two scored by Qadir leaving two runs left for the win. On the final delivery of the match, the bowler Courtney Walsh saw Jaffar well out of his crease and could have dismissed him by run out but graciously decided to bowl the delivery again. Qadir scored winning runs and secured the victory.

Narrowest win margins (by balls remaining)
Rank	Balls remaining	Margin	Target	Team	Opposition	Venue	Date
1	0 ♠	1 wicket	217	Pakistan	West Indies	Gaddafi Stadium, Lahore, Pakistan	16 October 1987
=2	1	2 wickets	235	New Zealand	England	Edgbaston, Birmingham, England	15 June 1983
=2	1	3 wickets	196	Sri Lanka	South Africa	Basin Reserve, Wellington, New Zealand	2 March 1992
=2	1	3 wickets	226	England	South Africa	Melbourne Cricket Ground, Melbourne, Australia	12 March 1992
=2	1	1 wicket	301	England	West Indies	Kensington Oval, Bridgetown, Barbados	21 April 2007
=2	1	4 wickets	298	New Zealand	South Africa	Eden Park, Auckland, New Zealand	24 March 2015
Last updated: 19 November 2023

==== Tied matches ====
A tie can occur when the scores of both teams are equal at the conclusion of play, provided that the side batting last has completed their innings. As of January 2024, there have been 43 matches that have ended in a tie in ODI cricket history, with five occurring at the Cricket World Cup. The first came in the second semi-final of 1999 World Cup at Edgbaston where South Africa's Allan Donald got run out on the third last ball of the match. Due to Australia finishing ahead of South Africa at the end of the Super Six stage with the superior net run rate, Australia advanced to the final. There they defeated Pakistan by eight wickets. The next three which took place in 2003, 2007 and 2011 respectively all occurred in the group stage with the teams sharing the points. The most recent tied match came in the 2019 Cricket World Cup final where both England and New Zealand finished their innings on 241 runs. For the first time in ODI cricket history a Super Over was used as a tie-breaker. The teams were still unable to be split after the Super Oval as both teams scored 15 runs so a boundary countback was invoked. With England having scored more boundaries in both the main game and the Super Over, 26 to 17, they were declared the winner and the World Cup champions.

Tied matches
Date	Batting first	Batting second	Venue
17 June 1999 ♠	Australia	South Africa	Edgbaston, Birmingham, England
3 March 2003 ♠	Sri Lanka	South Africa	Kingsmead Cricket Ground, Durban, South Africa
15 March 2007 ♠	Ireland	Zimbabwe	Sabina Park, Kingston, Jamaica
27 February 2011 ♠	India	England	M. Chinnaswamy Stadium, Bengaluru, India
14 July 2019 ♠	New Zealand	England	Lord's, London, England
Last updated: 19 November 2023

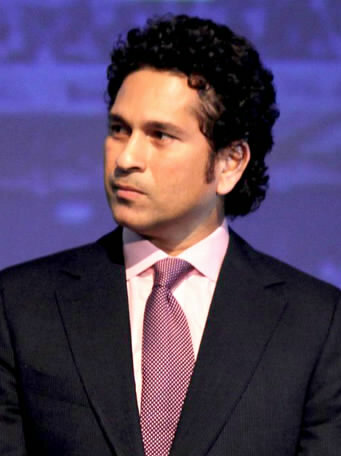
India's Sachin Tendulkar (pictured) has scored the most runs with 2,278 and most half-centuries with 15 across six World Cup tournaments from 1992 to 2011, a feat that he shares with Javed Miandad of Pakistan.

== Individual records ==
=== Batting records ===
==== Most runs ====
A run is the basic means of scoring in cricket. A run is scored when the batsman hits the ball with his bat and with his partner runs the length of 22 yards (20 m) of the pitch.

India's Sachin Tendulkar has scored the most runs at the Cricket World Cup with 2,278. Second is his compatriot Virat Kohli with 1,795, overtaking Ricky Ponting from Australia's total of 1,743 during the 2023 final.

Most runs
Rank	Runs	Player	Team	Matches	Innings	Period
1	2,278	Sachin Tendulkar	India	45	44	1992–2011
2	1,795	Virat Kohli	India	37	37	2011–2023
3	1,743	Ricky Ponting	Australia	46	42	1996–2011
4	1,575	Rohit Sharma	India	28	28	2015–2023
5	1,532	Kumar Sangakkara	Sri Lanka	37	35	2003–2015
Last updated: 19 November 2023

==== Highest individual score ====
During the quarter finals of the 2015 Cricket World Cup, New Zealand's Martin Guptill posted the second highest individual ODI innings score and the highest World Cup score of 237 not out against the West Indies at Wellington Regional Stadium. Two further double centuries scores have been achieved at the World Cup—Chris Gayle of the West Indies' 215 against Zimbabwe in 2015 and Australia's Glenn Maxwell's 201 not out in 2023 against Afghanistan.

Highest individual score
Rank	Runs	Player	Team	Opposition	Venue	Date
1	237*	Martin Guptill	New Zealand	West Indies	Wellington Regional Stadium, Wellington, New Zealand	21 March 2015
2	215	Chris Gayle	West Indies	Zimbabwe	Manuka Oval, Canberra, Australia	24 February 2015
3	201*	Glenn Maxwell	Australia	Afghanistan	Wankhede Stadium, Mumbai, India	7 November 2023
4	188*	Gary Kirsten	South Africa	United Arab Emirates	Rawalpindi Cricket Stadium, Rawalpindi, Pakistan	16 February 1996
5	183	Sourav Ganguly	India	Sri Lanka	County Ground, Taunton, England	26 May 1999
Last updated: 19 November 2023

==== Highest average ====
A batsman's batting average is the total number of runs they have scored divided by the number of times they have been dismissed.

South Africa all-rounder Lance Klusener holds the record for the highest average at the Cricket World Cup with 124.00. (Note: Of all the batters who have batted at least 10 innings at the Cricket World Cup) He is followed by Australia's Andrew Symonds with 103.00. The next two are Shreyas Iyer of India and Rachin Ravindra of New Zealand who have so far only played in the 2023 tournament with averages of 66.25 and 64.22, respectively.

Highest average
Rank	Average	Player	Team	Runs	Innings	Not out	Period
1	124.00	Lance Klusener	South Africa	372	11	8	1999–2003
2	103.00	Andrew Symonds	Australia	515	13	8	2003–2007
3	66.25	Shreyas Iyer	India	530	11	3	2023–2023
4	64.22	Rachin Ravindra	New Zealand	578	10	1	2023–2023
5	63.52	AB de Villiers	South Africa	1207	22	3	2007–2015
Qualification: 10 innings Last updated: 19 November 2023

==== Highest strike rate ====
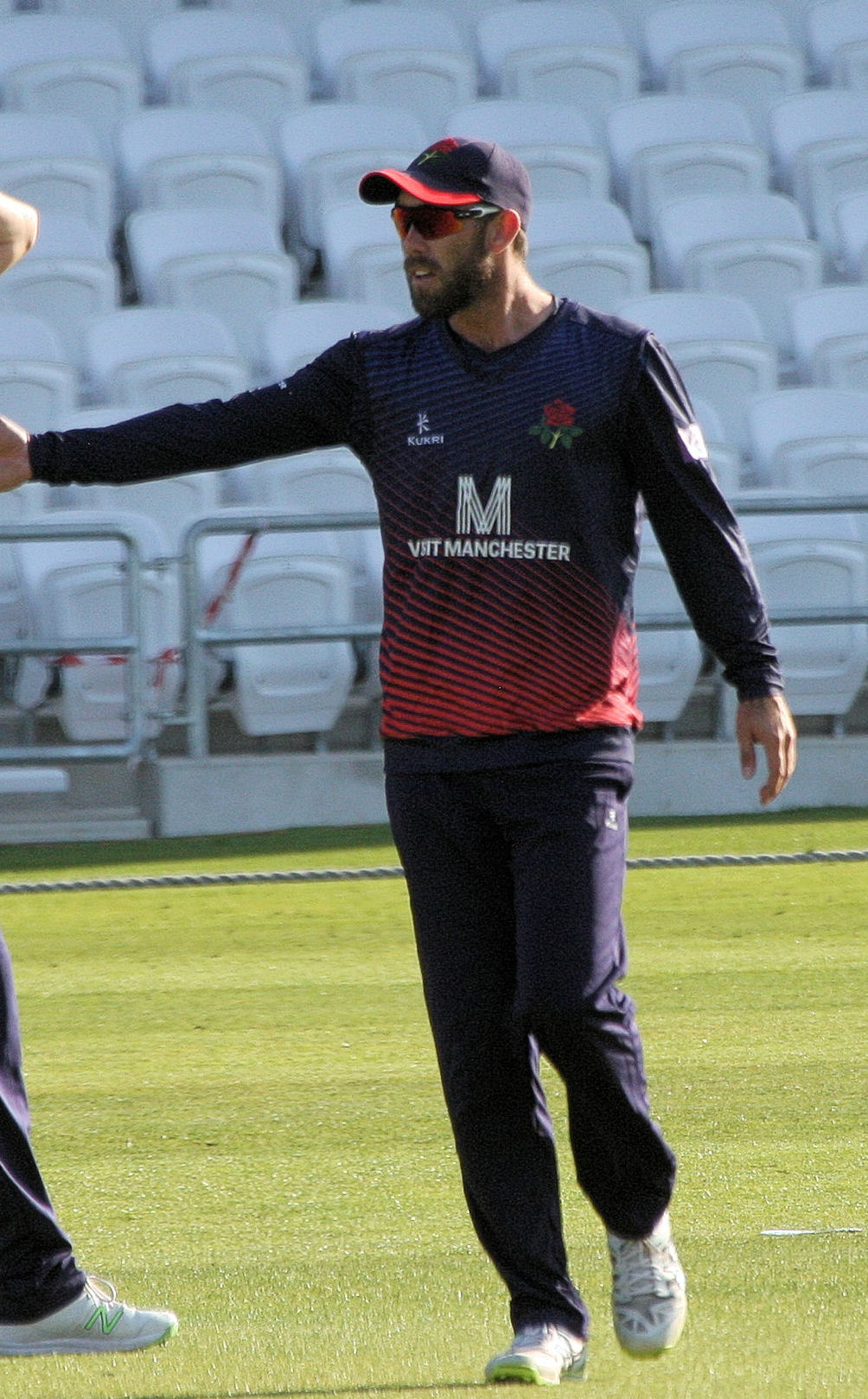
Glenn Maxwell of Australia (pictured) has the highest strike rate at the World Cup with 160.32. (Note: Of all the batters who have faced at least 500 balls at the Cricket World Cup)

A batsman's strike rate is the average number of runs scored per 100 balls faced.

Glenn Maxwell of Australia has the highest strike rate at the Cricket World Cup with 160.32. Former New Zealand wicket-keeper-batsman Brendon McCullum follows with 120.84 and Jos Buttler of England with a rate of 118.20 is third. A further eight players have an batting strike rate of above 100.

Highest strike rate
Rank	Strike rate	Player	Team	Runs	Balls faced	Period
1	160.32	Glenn Maxwell	Australia	901	562	2015–2023
2	120.84	Brendon McCullum	New Zealand	742	614	2003–2015
3	118.20	Jos Buttler	England	591	500	2015–2023
4	117.29	AB de Villiers	South Africa	1,207	1,029	2007–2015
5	115.14	Kapil Dev	India	669	581	1979–1992
Qualification: 500 balls faced Last updated: 19 November 2023

==== Most half-centuries ====
A half-century is a score of between 50 and 99 runs. Statistically, once a batsman's score reaches 100, it is no longer considered a half-century but a century.

Sachin Tendulkar of India has scored the most half-centuries at the Cricket World Cup with 15. He is followed by India's Virat Kohli on 12 and Bangladesh's Shakib Al Hasan with 11 fifties to his name.

Most half-centuries
Rank	Half centuries	Player	Team	Innings	Runs	Period
1	15	Sachin Tendulkar	India	44	2,278	1992–2011
2	12	Virat Kohli	India	37	1,795	2011–2023
3	11	Shakib Al Hasan	Bangladesh	36	1,332	2007–2023
4	10	Steve Smith	Australia	30	1,136	2011–2023
5	9	Jacques Kallis	South Africa	32	1,148	1996–2011
Last updated: 19 November 2023

==== Most centuries ====
A century is a score of 100 or more runs in a single innings.

India's Rohit Sharma has scored the most centuries in the Cricket World Cup with seven. He overtook the previous record of six held by his compatriot Sachin Tendulkar during the group stage match against Afghanistan at the 2023 edition. In the same tournament, Australia's David Warner drew equal with Tendulkar scoring his sixth World Cup century against the Netherlands.

Most centuries
Rank	Centuries	Player	Team	Innings	Runs	Period
1	7	Rohit Sharma	India	28	1,575	2015–2023
2	6	David Warner	Australia	29	1,527	2015–2023
2	6	Sachin Tendulkar	India	44	2,278	1992–2011
4	5	Kumar Sangakkara	Sri Lanka	35	1,532	2003–2015
4	5	Virat Kohli	India	37	1,795	2011–2023
4	5	Ricky Ponting	Australia	42	1,743	1996–2011
Last updated: 19 November 2023

WP:FL

==== Most runs in a single tournament ====
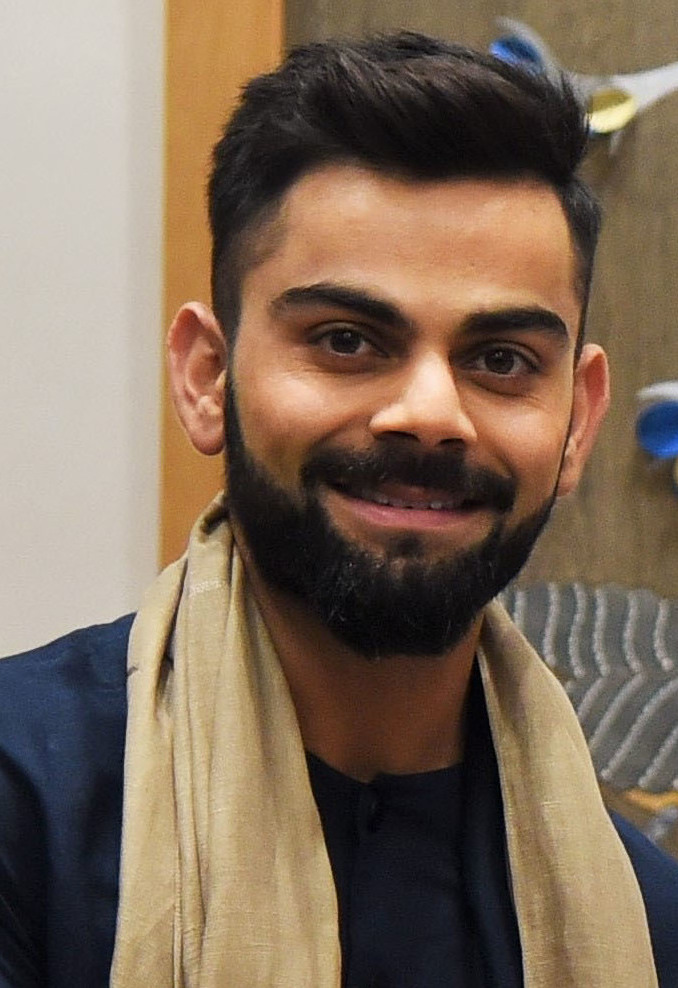
India's Virat Kohli (pictured) scored 765 runs in 2023 tournament, a World Cup record.

The 2023 Cricket World Cup saw India's Virat Kohli set the record for the most runs scored in a single World Cup, with 765 runs. He broke the previous record of 673 set the 2003 tournament by his compatriot Sachin Tendulkar. In third is Matthew Hayden of Australia who was the highest run scorer at 2007 World Cup with 659 runs.

Most runs in a single tournament
Rank	Runs	Player	Team	Matches	Innings	Tournament
1	765	Virat Kohli	India	11	11	2023
2	673	Sachin Tendulkar	India	11	11	2003
3	659	Matthew Hayden	Australia	11	10	2007
4	648	Rohit Sharma	India	9	9	2019
5	647	David Warner	Australia	10	10	2019
Last updated: 19 November 2023

==== Most ducks ====
A duck refers to a batsman being dismissed without scoring a run.

Ijaz Ahmed of Pakistan has scored the most number of ducks in the World Cup with five. New Zealand's Nathan Astle matched this number scoring five ducks across the three tournaments he played in. A further nine players have failed to score a run in a World Cup innings on four occasions each.

Most ducks
Rank	Ducks	Player	Team	Matches	Innings	Period
=1	5	Nathan Astle	New Zealand	22	22	1996–2003
=1	5	Ijaz Ahmed	Pakistan	29	26	1987–1999
=3	4	Kyle McCallan	Ireland	9	8	2007–2007
=3	4	Darren Bravo	West Indies	12	11	2011–2019
=3	4	Keith Arthurton	West Indies	14	13	1992–1999
=3	4	Mitchell Starc	Australia	28	19	2015–2023
=3	4	Angelo Mathews	Sri Lanka	27	21	2011–2023
=3	4	AB de Villiers	South Africa	23	22	2007–2015
=3	4	Krishnamachari Srikkanth	India	23	23	1983–1992
=3	4	Eoin Morgan	Ireland / England	29	27	2007–2019
=3	4	Inzamam-ul-Haq	Pakistan	35	33	1992–2007
Last updated: 19 November 2023

=== Bowling records ===
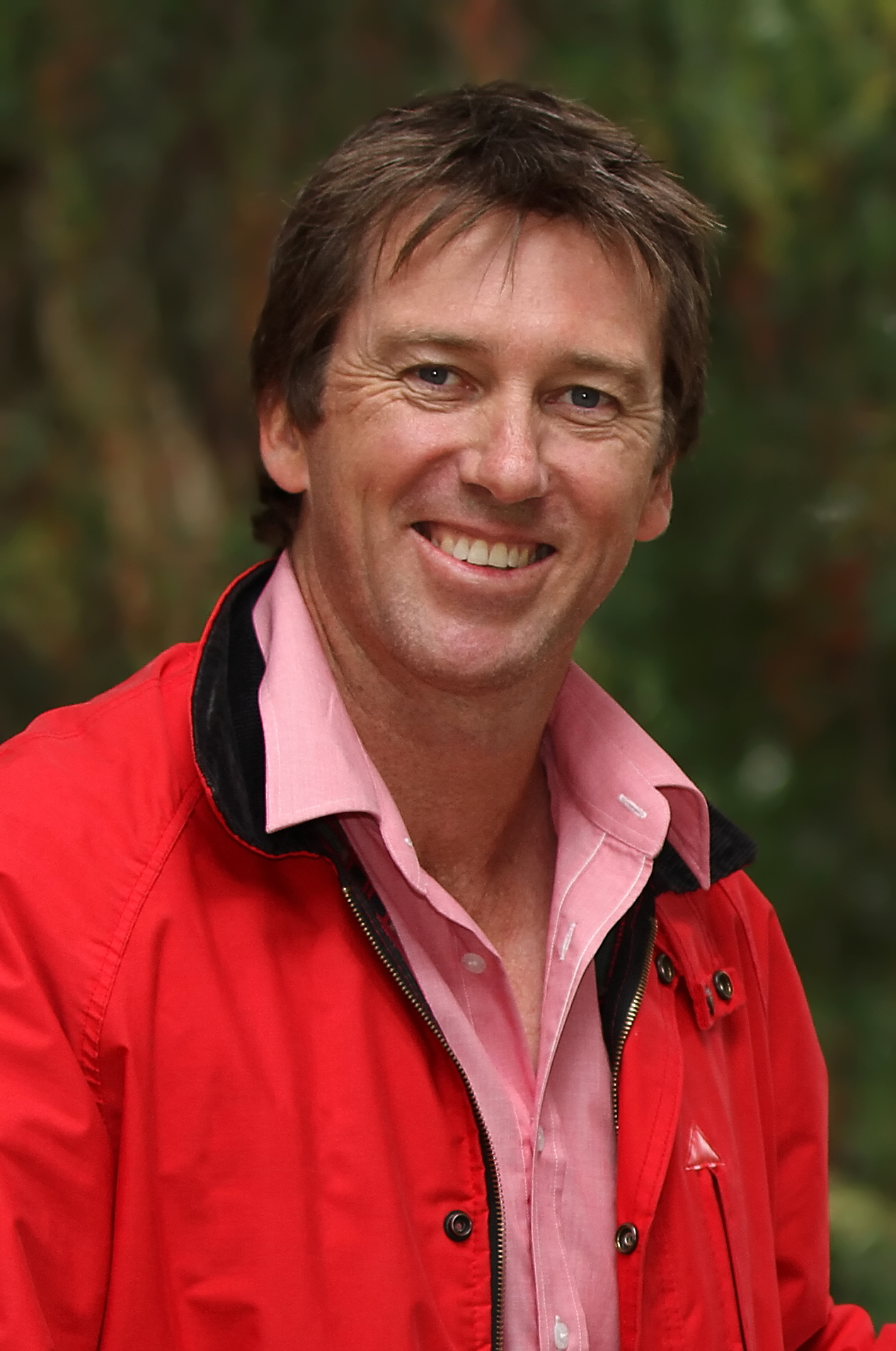
Australia's Glenn McGrath (pictured) has taken the most wickets with 71, has returned the best bowling figures with 7/15 and has the best average at the Cricket World Cup with 18.19.

==== Most wickets ====
A bowler takes the wicket of a batsman when the form of dismissal is bowled, caught, leg before wicket, stumped or hit wicket. If the batsman is dismissed by run out, obstructing the field, handling the ball, hitting the ball twice or timed out the bowler does not receive credit.

Australian fast-bowler Glenn McGrath holds the record for the most wickets taken in the Cricket World Cup with 71. He is followed by the Sri Lankan off spiner Muttiah Muralitharan on 68 and fellow Australian paceman Mitchell Starc with 65 wickets.

Most wickets
Rank	Wickets	Player	Team	Matches	Innings	Runs	Period
1	71	Glenn McGrath	Australia	39	39	1,292	1996–2007
2	68	Muttiah Muralitharan	Sri Lanka	40	39	1,335	1996–2011
3	65	Mitchell Starc	Australia	28	28	1,254	2015–2023
4	56	Lasith Malinga	Sri Lanka	29	28	1,281	2007–2019
5	55	Mohammed Shami	India	18	18	744	2015–2023
5	55	Wasim Akram	Pakistan	38	36	1,311	1987–2003
Last updated: 19 November 2023

==== Best figures in an innings ====
Bowling figures refers to the number of wickets a bowler has taken and the number of runs conceded.

Australia's undefeated run during the 2003 Cricket World Cup saw Glenn McGrath take 7/15 against Namibia and Andy Bichel 7/20 against England for the two best returns at the World Cup.

Best figures in an innings
Rank	Figures	Player	Team	Opposition	Venue	Date
1	7/15	Glenn McGrath	Australia	Namibia	North West Cricket Stadium, Potchefstroom, South Africa	27 February 2003
2	7/20	Andy Bichel	Australia	England	St George's Park Cricket Ground, Gqeberha, South Africa	2 March 2003
3	7/33	Tim Southee	New Zealand	England	Wellington Regional Stadium, Wellington, New Zealand	20 February 2015
4	7/51	Winston Davis	West Indies	Australia	Headingley, Leeds, England	11 June 1983
5	7/57	Mohammed Shami	India	New Zealand	Wankhede Stadium, Mumbai, India	15 November 2023
Last updated: 19 November 2023

==== Best average ====
A bowler's bowling average is the total number of runs they have conceded divided by the number of wickets they have taken.

Indian fast bowler Mohammad Shami holds the record for the best average at the Cricket World Cup with 13.53 He is followed by Australian Fast bowler Glenn McGrath on 18.19 and by Pakistani Imran Khan with a bowling average of 19.26 runs per wicket.

Best average
Rank	Average	Player	Team	Wickets	Runs	Balls	Period
1	18.19	Glenn McGrath	Australia	71	1,292	1,955	1996–2007
2	19.26	Imran Khan	Pakistan	34	655	1,017	1975–1992
3	19.29	Mitchell Starc	Australia	65	1,254	1,459	2015–2023
4	19.57	Jasprit Bumrah	India	38	744	1,055	2019–2023
5	19.63	Muttiah Muralitharan	Sri Lanka	68	1,335	2,061	1996–2011
Qualification: 1,000 balls Last updated: 19 November 2023

==== Best economy rate ====
A bowler's economy rate is the total number of runs they have conceded divided by the number of overs they have bowled.

West Indian bowler Andy Roberts holds the record for the best economy rate at the Cricket World Cup with 3.24. England's Ian Botham, with a rate of 3.43 runs per over is second on the list.

Best economy rate
Rank	Economy rate	Player	Team	Runs	Balls	Wickets	Period
1	3.24	Andy Roberts	West Indies	552	1,021	26	1975–1983
2	3.43	Ian Botham	England	762	1,332	30	1979–1992
3	3.52	Gavin Larsen	New Zealand	599	1,020	18	1992–1999
4	3.57	John Traicos	Zimbabwe	673	1,128	16	1983–1992
5	3.60	Shaun Pollock	South Africa	970	1,614	31	1996–2007
Qualification: 1,000 balls Last updated: 19 November 2023

==== Best strike rate ====
A bowler's strike rate is the total number of balls they have bowled divided by the number of wickets they have taken.

The Australian fast bowler Mitchell Starc holds the record for the best strike rate at the Cricket World Cup with 22.4. He sits ahead of Sri Lanka's Lasith Malinga with a rate of 24.8. Indian Zaheer Khan with rate of 27.1 deliveries per wicket is third.

Best strike rate
Rank	Strike rate	Player	Team	Wickets	Balls	Runs	Period
1	22.4	Mitchell Starc	Australia	65	1,459	1,254	2015–2023
2	24.8	Lasith Malinga	Sri Lanka	56	1,394	1,281	2007–2019
3	27.1	Zaheer Khan	India	44	1,193	890	2003–2011
4	27.5	Glenn McGrath	Australia	71	1,955	1,292	1996–2007
5	27.7	Jasprit Bumrah	India	38	1,055	744	2019–2023
Qualification: 1,000 balls Last updated: 19 November 2023

==== Most five-wicket hauls in an innings ====
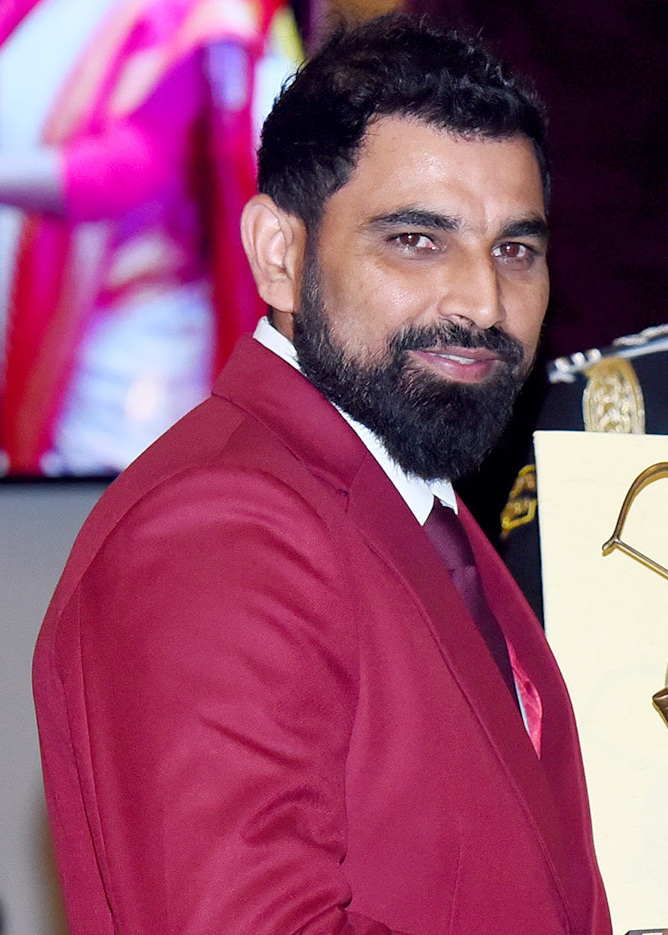
Indian Mohammed Shami (pictured) holds the World Cup records for the most career five-wicket hauls and the most five-wicket hauls taken in a single tournament with four and three, respectively.

A five-wicket haul refers to a bowler taking five wickets in a single innings.

At the conclusion of 2019 tournament, Australia's Mitchell Starc had taken the most five-wicket hauls at the Cricket World Cup with three. In the first semi-final of the 2023 World Cup, Indian pace bowler Mohammed Shami took his fourth career World Cup five-wicket haul to overtake Starc. This was also his third of the tournament, breaking the record of two five-wicket hauls in a single edition of the World Cup. They are both followed by seven players who have taken five wickets in a World Cup innings on two occasions each.

Most five-wicket hauls in an innings
Rank	Five-wicket hauls	Player	Team	Innings	Balls	Wickets	Period
1	4	Mohammed Shami	India	18	870	55	2015–2023
2	3	Mitchell Starc	Australia	28	1,459	65	2015–2023
=3	2	Gary Gilmour	Australia	2	144	11	1975–1975
=3	2	Vasbert Drakes	West Indies	6	311	16	2003–2003
=3	2	Ashantha de Mel	Sri Lanka	9	542	18	1983–1987
=3	2	Shaheen Afridi	Pakistan	14	769	34	2019–2023
=3	2	Mustafizur Rahman	Bangladesh	16	827	25	2019–2023
=3	2	Shahid Afridi	Pakistan	24	1,104	30	1999–2015
=3	2	Glenn McGrath	Australia	39	1,955	71	1996–2007
Last updated: 19 November 2023

==== Worst figures in an innings ====
The worst figures returned at the Cricket World Cup came during the England's clash against Afghanistan in the group stage of 2019 tournament at Old Trafford where the Afghan leg spinner Rashid Khan conceded 110 runs and no wickets from his nine overs.

Worst figures in an innings
Rank	Figures	Player	Team	Overs	Opposition	Venue	Date
1	0/110	Rashid Khan	Afghanistan	9	England	Old Trafford, Manchester, England	18 June 2019
2	0/107	Logan van Beek	Netherlands	10	India	M. Chinnaswamy Stadium, Bangalore, India	12 November 2023
3	0/92	Rudie van Vuuren	Namibia	10	Australia	North West Cricket Stadium, Potchefstroom, South Africa	27 February 2003
4	0/90	Shaheen Afridi	Pakistan	10	New Zealand	M. Chinnaswamy Stadium, Bangalore, India	4 November 2023
5	0/89	Mitchell Starc	Australia	9	New Zealand	Himachal Pradesh Cricket Association Stadium, Dharamshala, India	28 October 2023
Last updated: 19 November 2023

==== Most wickets in a single tournament ====
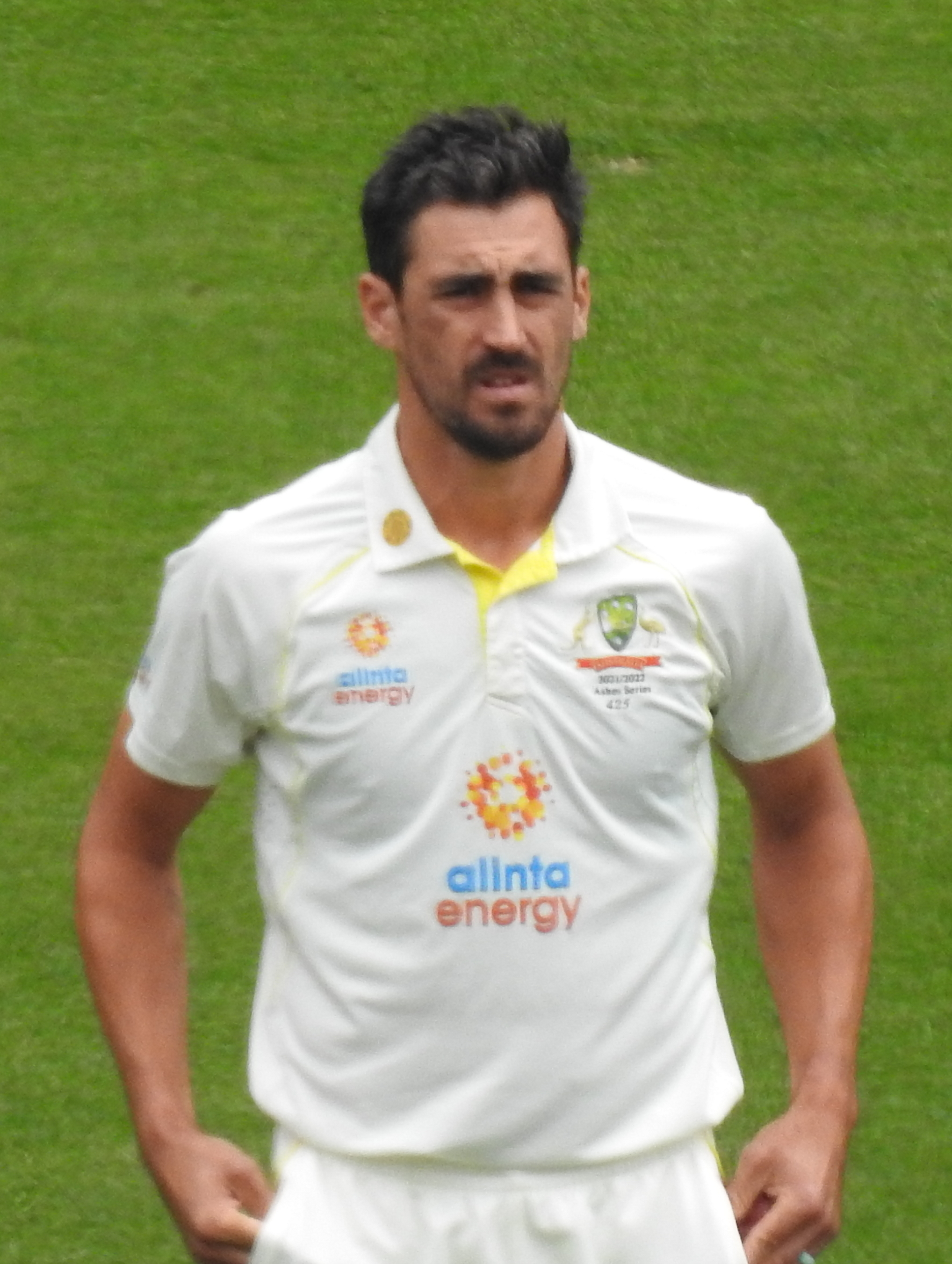
Australian pace bowler Mitchell Starc (pictured) holds the World Cup record for the best strike rate with 22.4 and for the most wickets in a single tournament with 27 taken at the 2019 World Cup.

The second semi-final of the 2019 tournament between England and Australia at Edgbaston saw Australia's Mitchell Starc take his 27th wicket surpassing the record of the most wickets taken in a single edition of the Cricket World Cup held by fellow countryman Glenn McGrath where he secured 26 dismissals twelve years previously at the 2007 event. India's Mohammed Shami, who missed the first four matches and was the leading wicket taker of the most recent World Cup in 2023, sits in third with 24.

Most wickets in a single tournament
Rank	Wickets	Player	Team	Matches	Tournament
1	27	Mitchell Starc	Australia	10	2019
2	26	Glenn McGrath	Australia	11	2007
3	24	Mohammed Shami	India	7	2023
4	23	Chaminda Vaas	Sri Lanka	10	2003
4	23	Muttiah Muralitharan	Sri Lanka	10	2007
4	23	Shaun Tait	Australia	11	2007
4	23	Adam Zampa	Australia	11	2023
Last updated: 19 November 2023

=== Wicket-keeping records ===
The wicket-keeper is a specialist fielder who stands behind the stumps being guarded by the batsman on strike and is the only member of the fielding side allowed to wear gloves and leg pads.

==== Most career dismissals ====
A wicket-keeper can be credited with the dismissal of a batsman in two ways, caught or stumped. A fair catch is taken when the ball is caught fully within the field of play without it bouncing after the ball has touched the striker's bat or glove holding the bat, while a stumping occurs when the wicket-keeper puts down the wicket while the batsman is out of his ground and not attempting a run.

Sri Lanka's Kumar Sangakkara has taken the most dismissals in ODI cricket as a designated wicket-keeper with 482. He narrowly sits ahead of the Australia gloveman Adam Gilchrist with 472 ODI career dismissals. Sri Lanka's final group stage match against Scotland at the 2015 tournament at Bellerive Oval in Hobart saw Sangakkara surpass Gilchrist as the wicket-keeper with the most dismissals at the Cricket World Cup, 54 to 52.

Most career dismissals
Rank	Dismissals	Player	Team	Matches	Period
1	54	Kumar Sangakkara	Sri Lanka	37	2003–2015
2	52	Adam Gilchrist	Australia	31	1999–2007
3	42	MS Dhoni	India	29	2007–2019
4	39	Quinton de Kock	South Africa	27	2015–2023
=5	33	Jos Buttler	England	26	2015–2023
=5	33	Mushfiqur Rahim	Bangladesh	38	2007–2023
Last updated: 19 November 2023

==== Most catches ====
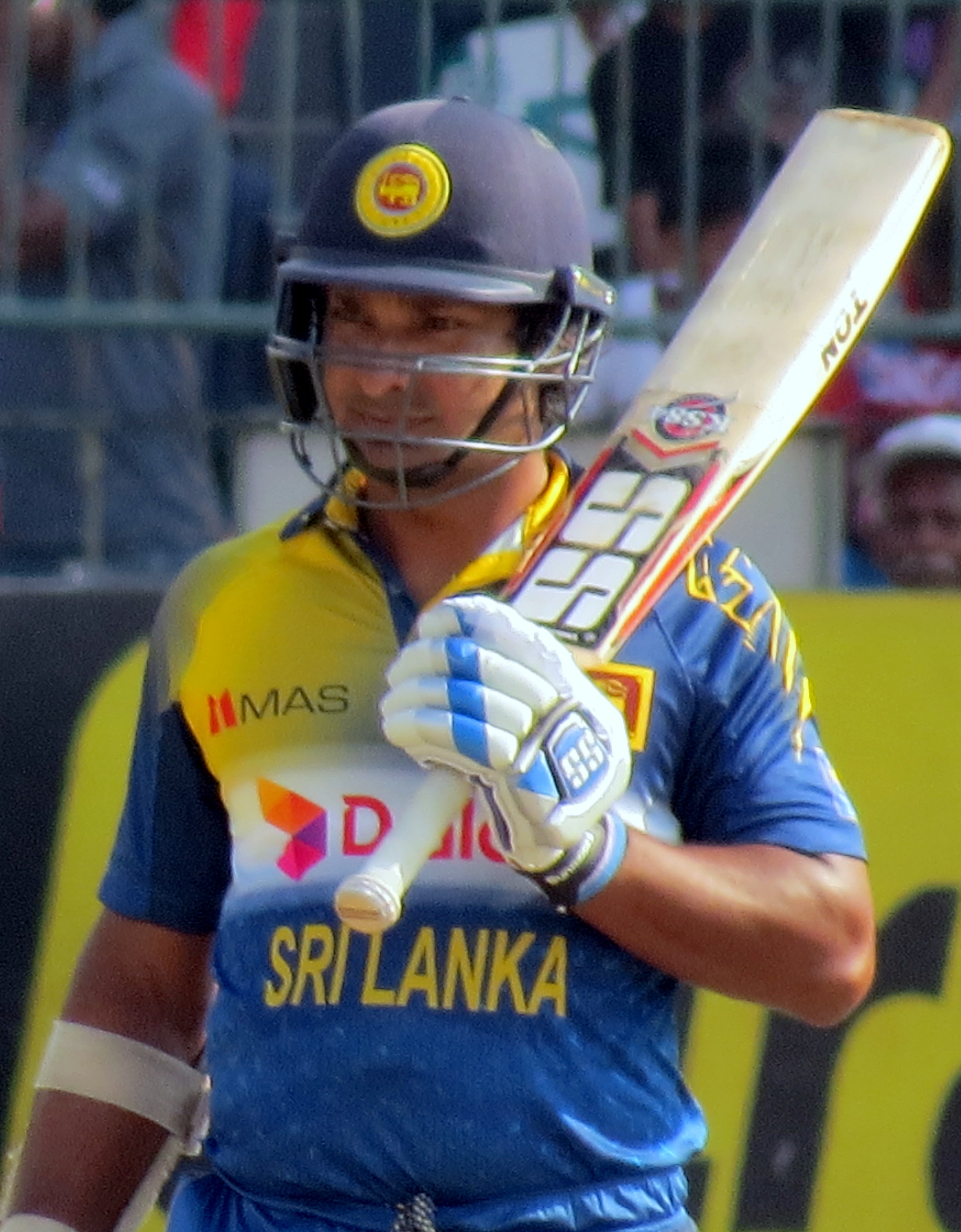
Kumar Sangakkara (pictured) who represented Sri Lanka on 37 occasions from 2003 to 2015 holds the record for the most dismissals and the most stumpings by a designated wicket-keeper at the Cricket World Cup.

Adam Gilchrist has taken the most number of catches as a designated wicket-keeper at the Cricket World Cup with 45. He sits ahead of Sangakkara and South Africa's Quinton de Kock on 41 and 37, respectively.

Most catches
Rank	Catches	Player	Team	Matches	Period
1	45	Adam Gilchrist	Australia	31	1999–2007
2	41	Kumar Sangakkara	Sri Lanka	37	2003–2015
3	37	Quinton de Kock	South Africa	27	2015–2023
4	34	MS Dhoni	India	29	2007–2019
5	31	Mark Boucher	South Africa	25	1999–2007
Last updated: 19 November 2023

==== Most stumpings ====
Sangakkara with 13 holds the record for the most stumpings at the Cricket World Cup. He is followed by India's MS Dhoni and Bangladesh's Mushfiqur Rahim with 8 each to their name.

Most stumpings
Rank	Stumpings	Player	Team	Matches	Period
1	13	Kumar Sangakkara	Sri Lanka	37	2003–2015
=2	8	MS Dhoni	India	29	2007–2019
=2	8	Mushfiqur Rahim	Bangladesh	38	2007–2023
=4	7	Adam Gilchrist	Australia	31	1999–2007
=4	7	Moin Khan	Pakistan	20	1992–1999
Last updated: 19 November 2023

==== Most dismissals in an innings ====
Adam Gilchrist became the first wicket-keeper to take six dismissals in an ODI innings, setting this record against South Africa at Newlands Cricket Ground in April 2000. Gilchrist was also the first glovemen to accomplish this feat in the Cricket World Cup where again it was against Namibia at the 2003 tournament. Since then Pakistan's Sarfaraz Ahmed and Quinton de Kock of South Africa also achieved the milestone at the 2015 and 2023 World Cups respectively. A further nine wicket-keepers have taken five dismissals in a World Cup innings.

Most dismissals in an innings
Rank	Dismissals	Player	Team	Opposition	Venue	Date
=1	6 ♠	Adam Gilchrist	Australia	Namibia	North West Cricket Stadium, Potchefstroom, South Africa	27 February 2003
=1	6 ♠	Sarfaraz Ahmed	Pakistan	South Africa	Eden Park, Auckland, New Zealand	7 March 2015
=1	6 ♠	Quinton de Kock	South Africa	Afghanistan	Narendra Modi Stadium, Ahmedabad, India	10 November 2023
=4	5	Syed Kirmani	India	Zimbabwe	Grace Road, Leicester, England	11 June 1983
=4	5	Jimmy Adams	West Indies	Kenya	Nehru Stadium, Pune, India	29 February 1996
=4	5	Rashid Latif	Pakistan	New Zealand	Gaddafi Stadium, Lahore, Pakistan	6 March 1996
=4	5	Nayan Mongia	India	Zimbabwe	Grace Road, Leicester, England	19 May 1999
=4	5	Ridley Jacobs	West Indies	New Zealand	County Ground, Southampton, England	24 May 1999
=4	5	Umar Akmal	Pakistan	Zimbabwe	The Gabba, Brisbane, Australia	1 March 2015
=4	5	Alex Carey	Australia	Afghanistan	County Ground, Bristol, England	1 June 2019
=4	5	Tom Latham	New Zealand	Afghanistan	County Ground, Taunton, England	8 June 2019
=4	5	Josh Inglis	Australia	India	Narendra Modi Stadium, Ahmedabad, India	19 November 2023
Last updated: 19 November 2023

==== Most dismissals in a single tournament ====
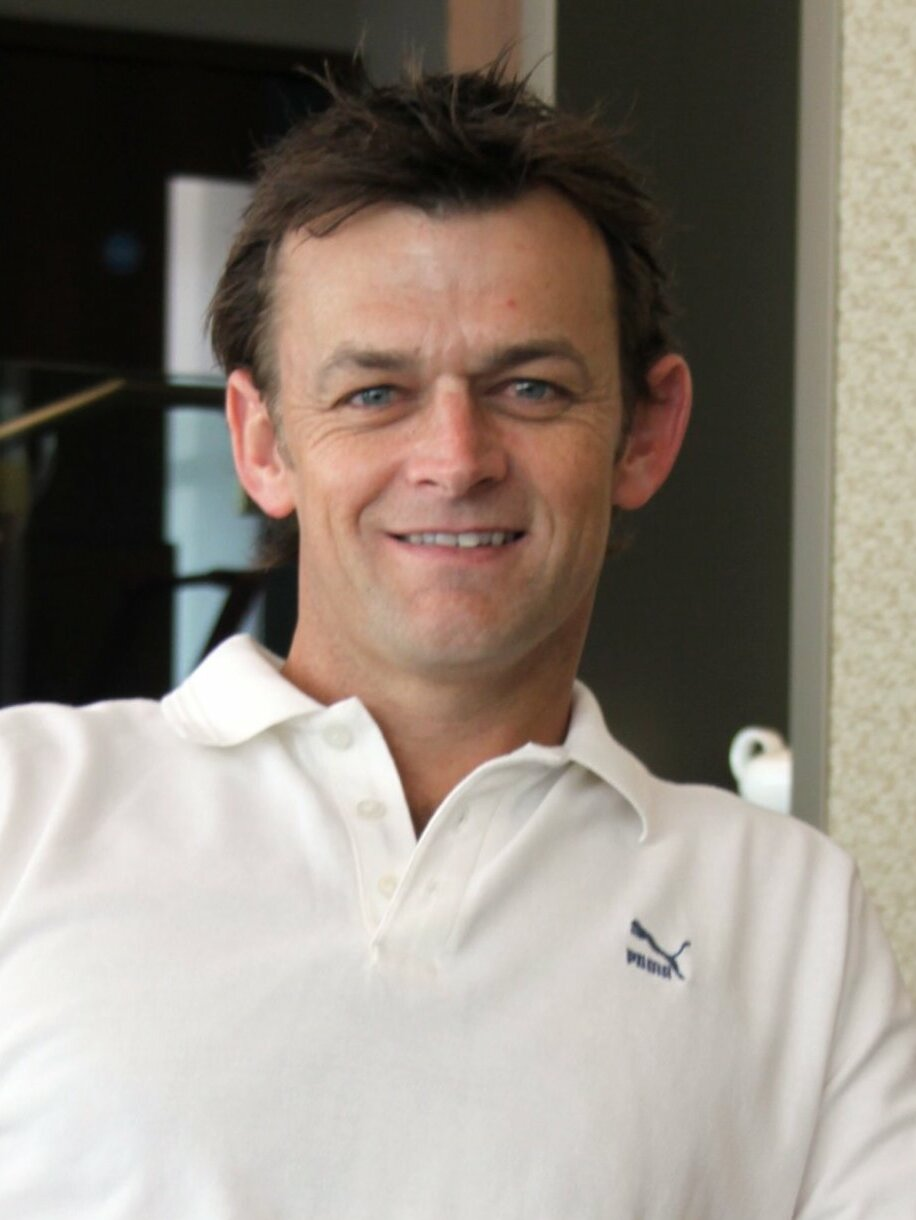
Australian gloveman Adam Gilchrist (pictured) holds the record for the most catches, was first to take six dismissals in a World Cup innings and jointly with New Zealand's Tom Latham holds the record for the most dismissals in a single tournament by a designated wicket-keeper with 21.

Australian Adam Gilchrist set the record for the most dismissals by a wicket-keeper in the Cricket World Cup at the 2003 edition with 21. This feat was equalled by the New Zealand gloveman Tom Latham at the 2019 World Cup final against England.

Most dismissals in a single tournament
Rank	Dismissals	Player	Team	Matches	Tournament
=1	21	Adam Gilchrist	Australia	10	2003
=1	21	Tom Latham	New Zealand	10	2019
=3	20	Alex Carey	Australia	10	2019
=3	20	Quinton de Kock	South Africa	10	2023
=5	17	Kumar Sangakkara	Sri Lanka	10	2003
=5	17	Adam Gilchrist	Australia	11	2007
=5	17	KL Rahul	India	11	2023
Last updated: 19 November 2023

=== Fielding records ===
==== Most catches ====
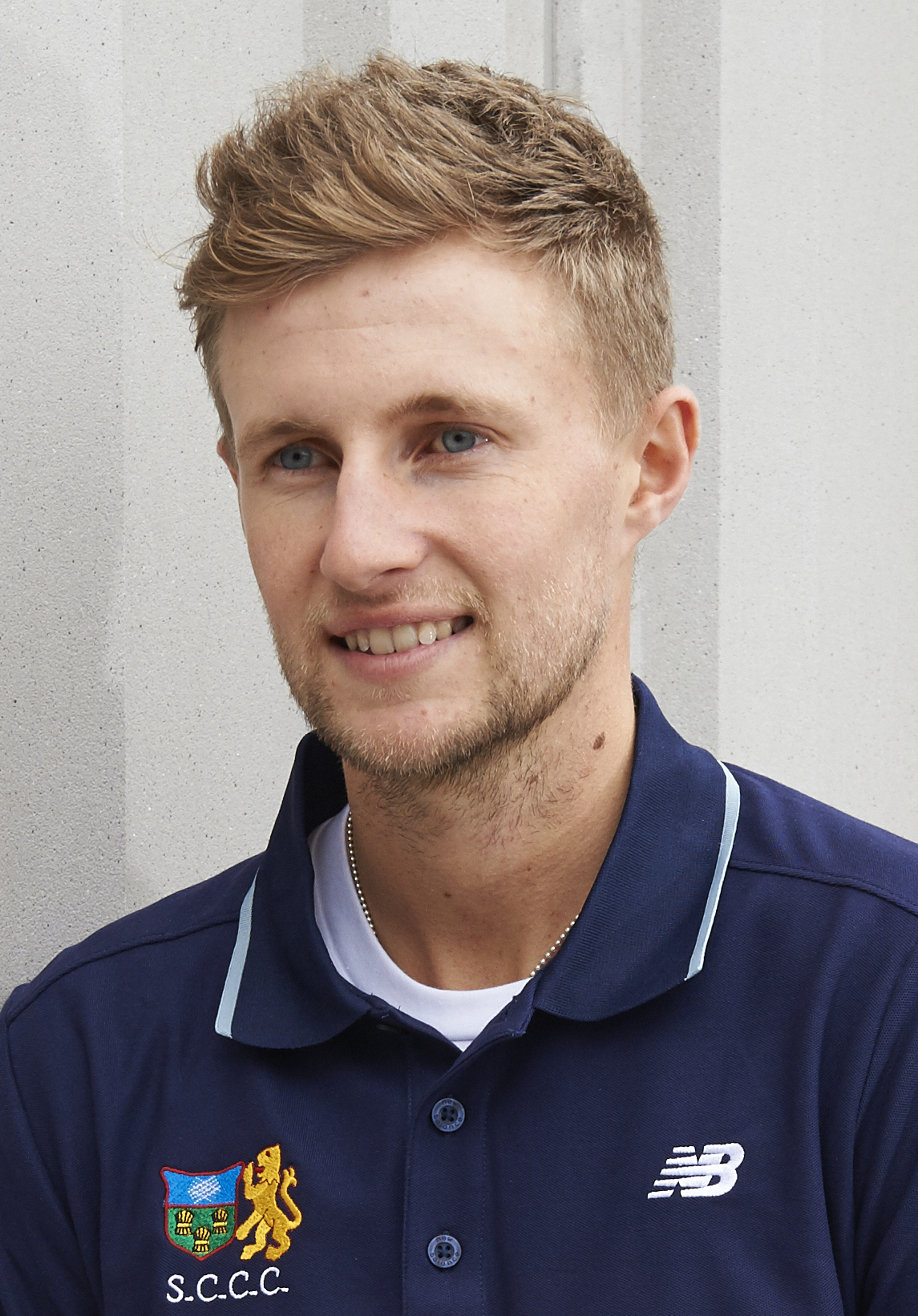
England's Joe Root (pictured) sits second behind Ricky Ponting for the most number catches at the World Cup, was the most recent player to secure four catches in a World Cup innings and holds the record for the most catches by non wicket-keeper in a single tournament with 13, set at 2019 World Cup.

Caught is one of the nine methods a batsman can be dismissed in cricket. (Note: In 2017, The Laws of Cricket were amended, reducing the methods of dismissals from ten to nine, with handled the ball now covered as part of obstructing the field.) A fair catch is defined as a fielder catching the ball, from a legal delivery, fully within the field of play without it bouncing when the ball has touched the striker's bat or glove holding the bat. The majority of catches are caught in the slips, located behind the batsman, next to the wicket-keeper, on the off side of the field. Most slip fielders are top order batsmen.

Former Australian captain Ricky Ponting holds the record for the most catches at the Cricket World Cup by a non-wicket-keeper with 28. He is followed England's Joe Root and India's Virat Kohli who, at the completion of the 2023 World Cup, had secured 25 and 20 catches respectively.

Most catches
Rank	Catches	Player	Team	Matches	Period
1	28	Ricky Ponting	Australia	46	1996–2011
2	25	Joe Root	England	26	2015–2023
3	20	Virat Kohli	India	37	2011–2023
4	18	Sanath Jayasuriya	Sri Lanka	38	1992–2007
=5	17	David Warner	Australia	29	2015–2023
=5	17	Chris Gayle	West Indies	35	2003–2019
Last updated: 19 November 2023

==== Most catches in an innings ====
Jonty Rhodes secured five catches in South Africa's match against the West Indies at the 1993 Hero Cup in India, the most by a non wicket-keeper in an ODI innings. Five players have managed to successfully take four catches in an World Cup innings, the latest being England's Joe Root against Afghanistan at the Arun Jaitley Cricket Stadium in Delhi during the 2023 tournament.

Most catches in an innings
Rank	Catches	Player	Team	Opposition	Venue	Date
=1	4	Mohammad Kaif	India	Sri Lanka	Wanderers Stadium, Johannesburg, South Africa	10 March 2003
=1	4	Soumya Sarkar	Bangladesh	Scotland	Saxton Oval, Nelson, New Zealand	5 March 2015
=1	4	Umar Akmal	Pakistan	Ireland	Adelaide Oval, Adelaide, Australia	15 March 2015
=1	4	Chris Woakes	England	Pakistan	Trent Bridge, Nottingham, England	3 June 2019
=1	4	Joe Root	England	Afghanistan	Arun Jaitley Cricket Stadium, Delhi, India	15 October 2023
Last updated: 19 November 2023

==== Most catches in a single tournament ====
England's Joe Root set the record for the most catches by non wicket-keeper in a single World Cup with 13 at the 2019 tournament. He broke Ricky Ponting of Australia's long standing record of 11 set at the 2003 World Cup in the second semi final against Australia and secured his 13th of the tournament in the final against New Zealand. The latest edition of the World Cup in 2023 saw New Zealand's Daryl Mitchell also take 11 catches to draw even with Ponting.

Most catches in a single tournament
Rank	Catches	Player	Team	Matches	Tournament
1	13	Joe Root	England	11	2019
=2	11	Daryl Mitchell	New Zealand	10	2023
=2	11	Ricky Ponting	Australia	11	2003
4	10	Faf du Plessis	South Africa	9	2019
5	9	Rilee Rossouw	South Africa	6	2015
Last updated: 19 November 2023

== Other records ==
=== Most matches ===
Ricky Ponting of Australia holds the record for the most matches played at the Cricket World Cup with 46. India's Sachin Tendulkar despite playing in one more tournament than Ponting is in second on 45.

Most matches
Rank	Matches	Player	Team	Period
1	46	Ricky Ponting	Australia	1996–2011
2	45	Sachin Tendulkar	India	1992–2011
=3	40	Mahela Jayawardene	Sri Lanka	1999–2015
=3	40	Muttiah Muralitharan	Sri Lanka	1996–2011
5	39	Glenn McGrath	Australia	1996–2007
Last updated: 19 November 2023

=== Most tournaments ===
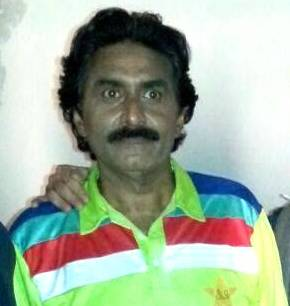
Javed Miandad of Pakistan (pictured) was the first cricketer to play in six World Cup tournaments. The feat was equalled by India's Sachin Tendulkar when he appeared at the 2011 World Cup.

Pakistan's Javed Miandad made an appearance in every Cricket World Cup from the inaugural edition in 1975 through to 1996, playing total of 33 matches across 6 tournaments. The feat was matched by India's Sachin Tendulkar who played 45 matches from 1992 to 2011. A further 18 players have appeared in five World Cups with the Bangladeshi pairing of Shakib Al Hasan and Mushfiqur Rahim the latest to do so in 2023.

Most tournaments
Rank	Tournaments	Player	Team	Matches	Period	Ref
=1	6	Sachin Tendulkar	India	45	1992–2011	
=1	6	Javed Miandad	Pakistan	33	1975–1996	
=3	5	Imran Khan	Pakistan	28	1975–1992	
=3	5	Arjuna Ranatunga	Sri Lanka	30	1983–1999	
=3	5	Aravinda de Silva	Sri Lanka	35	1987–2003	
=3	5	Wasim Akram	Pakistan	38	1987–2003	
=3	5	Inzamam-ul-Haq	Pakistan	35	1992–2007	
=3	5	Sanath Jayasuriya	Sri Lanka	38	1992–2007	
=3	5	Brian Lara	West Indies	34	1992–2007	
=3	5	Shivnarine Chanderpaul	West Indies	31	1996–2011	
=3	5	Jacques Kallis	South Africa	36	1996–2011	
=3	5	Muttiah Muralitharan	Sri Lanka	40	1996–2011	
=3	5	Ricky Ponting	Australia	46	1996–2011	
=3	5	Thomas Odoyo	Kenya	25	1996–2011	
=3	5	Steve Tikolo	Kenya	28	1996–2011	
=3	5	Mahela Jayawardene	Sri Lanka	40	1999–2015	
=3	5	Shahid Afridi	Pakistan	27	1999–2015	
=3	5	Chris Gayle	West Indies	35	2003–2019	
=3	5	Shakib Al Hasan	Bangladesh	36	2007–2023	
=3	5	Mushfiqur Rahim	Bangladesh	38	2007–2023	
Last updated: 19 November 2023

=== Most consecutive matches ===
The most capped World Cup player, Australia's Ricky Ponting, also holds the record for the most consecutive matches played. Missing only the opening pool match against Sri Lanka at the 1996 World Cup due to the forfeit over security concerns in Colombo, Ponting went on to play in all of Australia's next 46 matches. He is followed his compatriot Glenn McGrath with 39 straight matches from 1996 to 2007. India's Sachin Tendulkar only missed one World Cup match in his career, the group stage match against Zimbabwe in 1999. His father died and he flew home to India for the funeral. He returned to England in time to play India's next match against Kenya.

Most consecutive matches
Rank	Matches	Player	Team	Period
1	46	Ricky Ponting	Australia	1996–2011
2	39	Glenn McGrath	Australia	1996–2007
3	38	Mushfiqur Rahim	Bangladesh	2007–2023
=4	37	Kumar Sangakkara	Sri Lanka	2003–2015
=4	37	Virat Kohli	India	2011–2023
Last updated: 19 November 2023

=== Most matches as captain ===
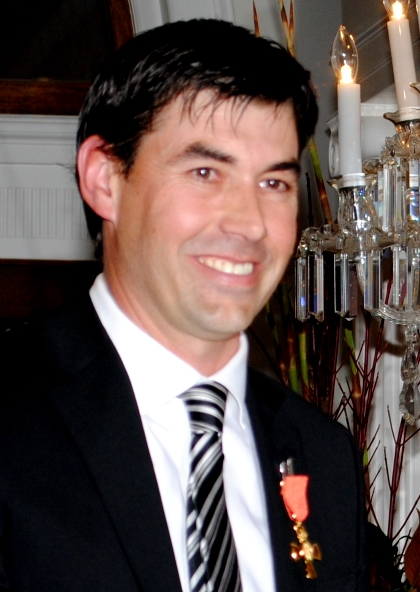
Stephen Fleming (pictured) captained New Zealand in 27 World Cup matches at the 1999, 2003 and 2007 tournaments. He is second only to Australia's Ricky Ponting for most number of matches played as captain at the Cricket World Cup.

Ricky Ponting, who led the Australian cricket team at the 2003, 2007 and 2011 tournaments, holds the record for the most matches played as captain at the Cricket World Cup with 29. Stephen Fleming, who skippered New Zealand from 1999 to 2007 is second with 27 matches. India's captain from 1992 to 1999, Mohammad Azharuddin, is third on the list with 23.

Most matches as captain
Rank	Matches	Player	Team	Period
1	29	Ricky Ponting	Australia	2003–2011
2	27	Stephen Fleming	New Zealand	1999–2007
3	23	Mohammad Azharuddin	India	1992–1999
4	22	Imran Khan	Pakistan	1983–1992
=5	17	MS Dhoni	India	2011–2015
=5	17	Clive Lloyd	West Indies	1975–1983
=5	17	Eoin Morgan	England	2015–2019
Last updated: 19 November 2023

=== Youngest players ===
The youngest player to play in an ODI match is claimed to be Hasan Raza at the age of 14 years and 233 days. Making his debut for Pakistan against Zimbabwe on 30 October 1996, there is some doubt as to the validity of Raza's age at the time. The youngest to appear at the Cricket World Cup was Nitish Kumar who, at the age of 16 years and 283 days, played in Canada's second group stage match at the 2011 tournament against Zimbabwe eclipsing the record that Bangladesh's Talha Jubair had set at the 2003 World Cup playing against the West Indies at 17 years and 70 days old.

Youngest players
Rank	Age	Player	Team	Opposition	Venue	Date
1	16 years and 283 days	Nitish Kumar	Canada	Zimbabwe	Vidarbha Cricket Association Stadium, Nagpur, India	28 February 2011
2	17 years and 70 days	Talha Jubair	Bangladesh	West Indies	Willowmoore Park, Benoni, South Africa	18 February 2003
3	17 years and 186 days	Alexei Kervezee	Netherlands	South Africa	Warner Park Stadium, Basseterre, South Africa	16 March 2007
4	17 years and 237 days	Sudath Pasqual	Sri Lanka	New Zealand	Trent Bridge, Nottingham, England	9 June 1979
5	17 years and 266 days	Malachi Jones	Bermuda	India	Queen's Park Oval, Port of Spain, Trinidad and Tobago	19 March 2007
Last updated: 19 November 2023

=== Oldest players ===
The Netherlands' fifth and final match in the 1996 Cricket World Cup saw Nolan Clarke set the record for the oldest player to appear in an ODI match at 47 years and 257 days. This broke the World Cup record set at the previous tournament where John Traicos representing Zimbabwe played in their final group stage match against England at the age of 44 years and 306 days.

Oldest players
Rank	Age	Player	Team	Opposition	Venue	Date
1	47 years and 257 days ♠	Nolan Clarke	Netherlands	South Africa	Rawalpindi Cricket Stadium, Rawalpindi, Pakistan	5 March 1996
2	44 years and 306 days	John Traicos	Zimbabwe	England	Lavington Sports Ground, Albury, Australia	18 March 1992
3	43 years and 267 days	Khurram Khan	United Arab Emirates	West Indies	McLean Park, Napier, New Zealand	15 March 2015
4	43 years and 236 days	Lennie Louw	Namibia	Zimbabwe	Harare Sports Club, Harare, Zimbabwe	10 February 2003
5	43 years and 129 days	Flavian Aponso	Netherlands	South Africa	Rawalpindi Cricket Stadium, Rawalpindi, Pakistan	5 March 1996
Last updated: 19 November 2023

== Partnership records ==
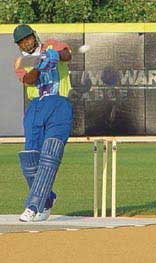
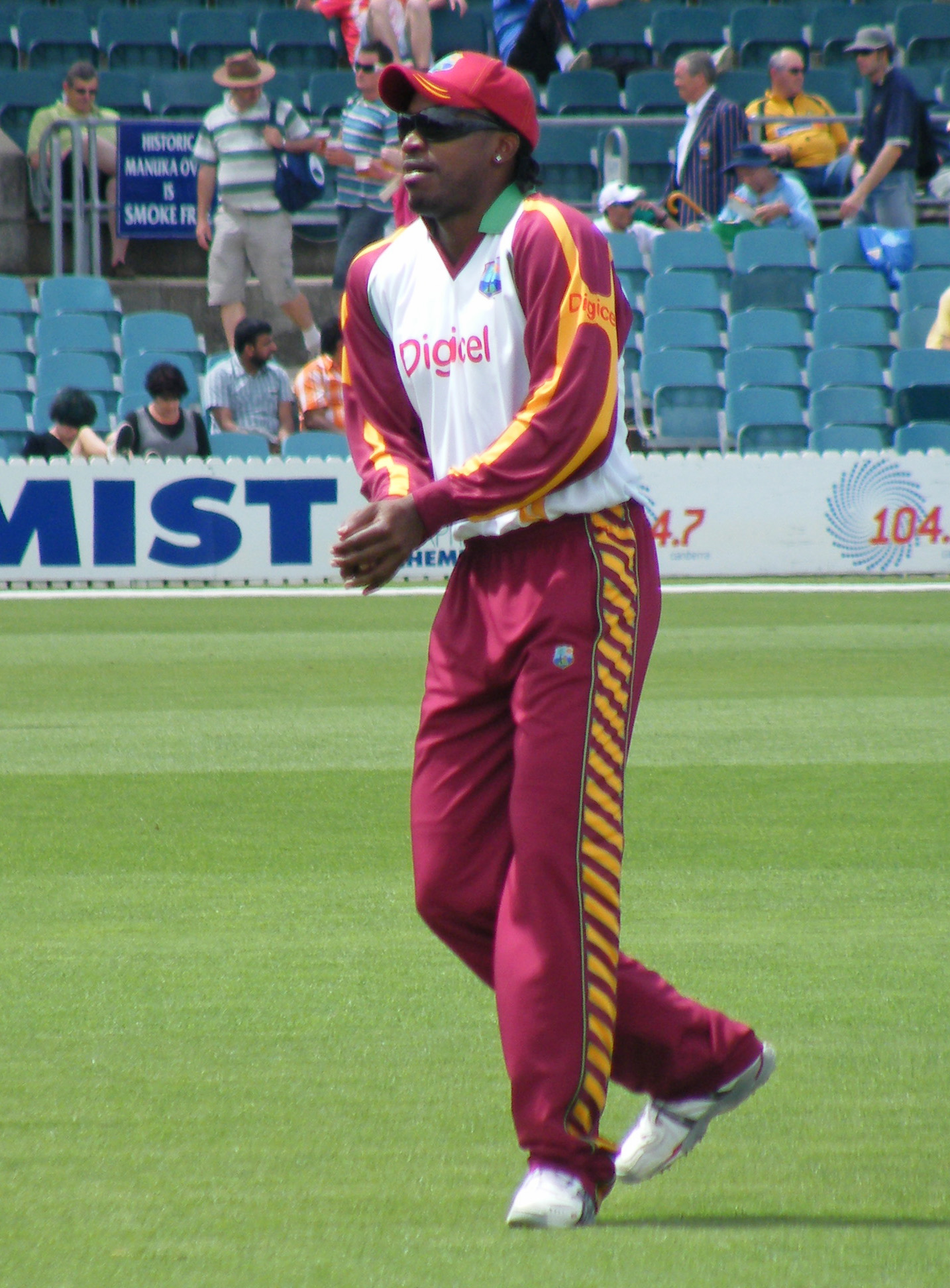
Marlon Samuels (left) and Chris Gayle (right) of West Indies hold the ODI record for the highest partnership by runs with 372.

In cricket, two batsmen are always present at the crease batting together in a partnership. This partnership will continue until one of them is dismissed, retires or the innings comes to a close.

=== Highest partnerships by wicket ===
A wicket partnership describes the number of runs scored before each wicket falls. The first wicket partnership is between the opening batsmen and continues until the first wicket falls. The second wicket partnership then commences between the not out batsman and the number three batsman. This partnership continues until the second wicket falls. The third wicket partnership then commences between the not out batsman and the new batsman. This continues down to the tenth wicket partnership. When the tenth wicket has fallen, there is no batsman left to partner so the innings is closed.

Three ODI cricket partnership records have been set at the World Cup. West Indians Marlon Samuels and Chris Gayle for the second wicket, the South African pairing of David Miller and JP Duminy for the fifth wicket and most recently Glenn Maxwell and Pat Cummins set the eighth wicket ODI partnership record against Afghanistan at the 2023 tournament. The oldest World Cup partnership records are for the ninth and tenth wicket where both were set at the 1983 tournament.

Highest partnerships by wicket
Wicket	Runs	First batsman	Second batsman	Team	Opposition	Venue	Date
1st wicket	282	Upul Tharanga	Tillakaratne Dilshan	Sri Lanka	Zimbabwe	Pallekele International Cricket Stadium, Kandy, Sri Lanka	10 March 2011
2nd wicket	372 ♠	Marlon Samuels	Chris Gayle	West Indies	Zimbabwe	Manuka Oval, Canberra, Australia	24 February 2015
3rd wicket	237*	Sachin Tendulkar	Rahul Dravid	India	Kenya	County Ground, Bristol, England	23 May 1999
4th wicket	208	Shreyas Iyer	KL Rahul	India	Netherlands	M. Chinnaswamy Stadium, Bengaluru, India	12 November 2023
5th wicket	256* ♠	David Miller	JP Duminy	South Africa	Zimbabwe	Seddon Park, Hamilton, New Zealand	15 February 2015
6th wicket	162	Kevin O'Brien	Alex Cusack	Ireland	England	M. Chinnaswamy Stadium, Bengaluru, India	2 March 2011
7th wicket	130	Logan van Beek	Sybrand Engelbrecht	Netherlands	Sri Lanka	Bharat Ratna Shri Atal Bihari Vajpayee Ekana Cricket Stadium, Lucknow, India	21 October 2023
8th wicket	202* ♠	Glenn Maxwell	Pat Cummins	Australia	Afghanistan	Wankhede Stadium, Mumbai, India	7 November 2023
9th wicket	126*	Syed Kirmani	Kapil Dev	India	Zimbabwe	Nevill Ground, Royal Tunbridge Wells, England	18 June 1983
10th wicket	71	Andy Roberts	Joel Garner	West Indies	India	Old Trafford, Manchester, England	9 June 1983
Last updated: 19 November 2023

=== Highest partnerships by runs ===
The highest ODI partnership by runs for any wicket is held by the West Indian pairing of Chris Gayle and Marlon Samuels who put together a second wicket partnership of 372 runs during the 2015 Cricket World Cup against Zimbabwe. This broke the previous highest partnership set at the World Cup where Sourav Ganguly and Rahul Dravid came together to score 318 in India's defeat of Sri Lanka at the 1999 tournament. This was also an ODI record at the time of posting. These are the only two partnership totals greater than 300 runs to be achieved at the World Cup.

Highest partnerships by runs
Rank	Wicket	Runs	First batsman	Second batsman	Team	Opposition	Venue	Date
1	372 ♠	2nd wicket	Marlon Samuels	Chris Gayle	West Indies	Zimbabwe	Manuka Oval, Canberra, Australia	24 February 2015
2	318	2nd wicket	Sourav Ganguly	Rahul Dravid	India	Sri Lanka	County Ground, Taunton, England	26 May 1999
3	282	1st wicket	Upul Tharanga	Tillakaratne Dilshan	Sri Lanka	Zimbabwe	Pallekele International Cricket Stadium, Kandy, Sri Lanka	10 March 2011
4	273*	2nd wicket	Rachin Ravindra	Devon Conway	New Zealand	England	Narendra Modi Stadium, Ahmedabad, India	5 October 2023
5	260	2nd wicket	David Warner	Steve Smith	Australia	Afghanistan	WACA Ground, Perth, Australia	4 March 2015
Last updated: 19 November 2023

== Umpiring records ==
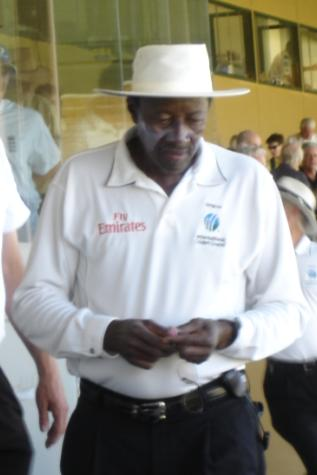
West Indian Steve Bucknor (pictured) has officiated 45 World Cup matches, just one behind David Shepherd of England.

=== Most matches umpired ===
An umpire in cricket is a person who officiates the match according to the Laws of Cricket. Two umpires adjudicate the match on the field, whilst a third umpire has access to video replays, and a fourth umpire looks after the match balls and other duties. The records below are only for on-field umpires.

David Shepherd of England holds the record for the most Cricket World Cup matches umpired with 46. He sits narrowly ahead of the West Indies' Steve Bucknor on 45 and Pakistan's Aleem Dar who has officiated in 34 matches from 2003 to 2019.

Most matches umpired
Rank	Matches	Umpire	Board	Period
1	46	David Shepherd	England	1983–2003
2	45	Steve Bucknor	(Cricket West Indies) West Indies	1992–2007
3	34	Aleem Dar	Pakistan	2003–2019
4	28	Kumar Dharmasena	Sri Lanka	2011–2023
5	27	Richard Kettleborough	England	2011–2023
Last updated: 19 November 2023

== See also ==
- List of One Day International cricket records
- List of ICC Men's T20 World Cup records
