= 2007 Cricket World Cup Group A =

The 2007 Cricket World Cup, which took place in the West Indies from 13 March to 28 April 2007, featured 16 teams, who were divided into four groups. Group A was made up of full ICC members Australia and South Africa, and associate members Netherlands and Scotland. Australia and South Africa each qualified for the Super Eights by winning their first two matches, which meant their final game against each other would decide who finished top of the group; Australia won by 83 runs to claim top spot. Meanwhile, Scotland and the Netherlands played off in their final match to determine which team finished bottom; the Netherlands won by 8 wickets and finished third.

== Table ==
| Pos | Team | Pld | W | L | T | NR | Pts | NRR |
|---|---|---|---|---|---|---|---|---|
| 1 | Australia | 3 | 3 | 0 | 0 | 0 | 6 | 3.433 |
| 2 | South Africa | 3 | 2 | 1 | 0 | 0 | 4 | 2.403 |
| 3 | Netherlands | 3 | 1 | 2 | 0 | 0 | 2 | −2.527 |
| 4 | Scotland | 3 | 0 | 3 | 0 | 0 | 0 | −3.793 |

Source: ESPNcricinfo

== Australia vs Scotland ==
14 March
Scorecard

| Australia; 334/6 (50 overs) | v | Scotland; 131 (40.2 overs) |
| Ricky Ponting 113 (93); Majid Haq 2/49 (7 overs) | | Colin Smith 51 (76); Glenn McGrath 3/14 (6 overs) |

Australia won by 203 runs
Warner Park Stadium, Basseterre
Umpires: Steve Bucknor (WI) and Asoka de Silva (SL)
Player of the match: Ricky Ponting (Aus)

Australia were put in to bat and made the seventh-highest total in World Cup history, It was nevertheless the third-lowest total in Scotland's ODI history and the third time a team had won by more than 200 runs in World Cup cricket. Ricky Ponting became the leading Australian run-scorer in World Cups, second overall only to Sachin Tendulkar. In reply, Colin Smith made his first ODI half-century on World Cup debut, and only ten men batted for Scotland; John Blain, one of two players in the eleven with previous World Cup experience, suffered an injury and was absent.

== Netherlands vs South Africa ==
16 March
Scorecard

| South Africa; 353/3 (40 overs) | v | Netherlands; 132/9 (40 overs) |
| Jacques Kallis 128* (109); Billy Stelling 1/43 (8 overs) | | Ryan ten Doeschate 57 (74); Justin Kemp 2/18 (4 overs) |

South Africa won by 221 runs
Warner Park Stadium, Basseterre
Umpires: Mark Benson (Eng) and Tony Hill (NZ)
Player of the match: Herschelle Gibbs (SA)

- Match reduced to 40 overs due to rain

In a match shortened to 40 overs due to wet pitch conditions, South Africa still managed the third 200-run victory at this World Cup, scoring runs at a rate faster than that recorded by Sri Lanka when they set the world record number of runs in a One-day International in July 2006 against this Dutch team. Though Dutch wicket-keeper Jeroen Smits caught Abraham de Villiers for nought in the first over, and South Africa had made four runs in the first five overs, things went South Africa's way from then on. Herschelle Gibbs hit Daan van Bunge for six sixes in the 30th over, a first in ODI cricket, Mark Boucher scored a fifty off 21 deliveries, a World Cup record and two balls off his own South African record, and added another 25 from ten balls before time was up. South Africa also became the first team to make three century partnerships in a One-day International, and hit a World Cup record of eighteen sixes.

For the Netherlands, Tim de Leede, Daan van Bunge and Luuk van Troost conceded 163 runs in their 12 overs between them, and when batting, the Dutch team's only professional Ryan ten Doeschate was their only man to pass 25, making 57 before he was run out as one of three Dutch batsmen to suffer this fate. Shaun Pollock's six overs cost four runs, the most economical spell of the World Cup thus far.

== Australia vs Netherlands ==
18 March
Scorecard

| Australia; 358/5 (50 overs) | v | Netherlands; 129 (26.5 overs) |
| Brad Hodge 123* (89); Tim de Leede 2/40 (10 overs) | | Daan van Bunge 33 (33); Brad Hogg 4/27 (4.5 overs) |

Australia won by 229 runs
Warner Park Stadium, Basseterre
Umpires: Steve Bucknor (WI) and Tony Hill (NZ)
Player of the match: Brad Hodge (Aus)

The fourth 200-run win in ten games of the Cup thus far, with Australia becoming the first team to win consecutive One-day Internationals by 200 runs or more. Glenn McGrath became the second bowler in World Cup history to take 50 wickets at the tournament.

Australia chose to bat first, losing three wickets by the 20-over mark, with Tim de Leede having both openers caught, but Michael Clarke and Brad Hodge set a World Cup record fourth-wicket partnership with 204, and Australia eventually ended on 358 for five. Hodge's last 28 balls yielded 73 runs. Netherlands' openers Bas Zuiderent and Darron Reekers made 36 at nearly a run-a-ball in the first six overs, but Nathan Bracken had Reekers caught for 25, and four more wickets followed for ten runs. After van Bunge and de Leede had put on 40 for the sixth wicket, Glenn McGrath and Brad Hogg ended the innings.

== Scotland vs South Africa ==
20 March
Scorecard

| Scotland; 186/8 (50 overs) | v | South Africa; 188/3 (23.2 overs) |
| Dougie Brown 45 (64); Andrew Hall 3/48 (10 overs) | | Graeme Smith 91 (65); Majid Haq 2/43 (6 overs) |

South Africa won by 7 wickets
Warner Park Stadium, Basseterre
Umpires: Mark Benson (Eng) and Asoka de Silva (SL)
Player of the match: Graeme Smith (SA)

68% of South Africa's total was made up of boundaries, as Graeme Smith and A. B. de Villiers thumped runs and South Africa qualified for the Super Eights, and the result also confirmed Australia's place. South Africa bowled first, and after Fraser Watts and Majid Haq made it through the first ten overs, South Africa took a wicket every five overs to reduce Scotland to 84 for five after 30 overs. Andrew Hall and Charl Langeveldt took the wickets, but also got hit for runs by Dougie Brown, John Blain and Paul Hoffmann as Scotland posted their highest-ever World Cup total of 186.

Nevertheless, South Africa made their way to the total in half the required time, as Graeme Smith and A. B. de Villiers hit at a rate of more than eight an over. Scotland turned to their spin bowlers in the thirteenth over, with Majid Haq and Glenn Rogers taking three wickets, though they still cost nearly eight an over between them. Justin Kemp hit the winning runs with a six off Rogers.

== Netherlands vs Scotland ==
22 March
Scorecard

| Scotland; 136 (34.1 overs) | v | Netherlands; 140/2 (23.5 overs) |
| Glenn Rogers 26 (30); Billy Stelling 3/12 (8 overs) | | Ryan ten Doeschate 70* (68); John Blain 2/29 (5 overs) |

Netherlands won by 8 wickets
Warner Park Stadium, Basseterre
Umpires: Asoka de Silva (SL) and Tony Hill (NZ)
Player of the match: Billy Stelling (Ned)

== Australia vs South Africa ==
24 March
Scorecard

| Australia; 377/6 (50 overs) | v | South Africa; 294 (48 overs) |
| Matthew Hayden 101 (68); Andrew Hall 2/60 (10 overs) | | AB de Villiers 92 (70); Brad Hogg 3/61 (10 overs) |

Australia won by 83 runs
Warner Park Stadium, Basseterre
Umpires: Mark Benson (Eng) and Steve Bucknor (WI)
Player of the match: Matthew Hayden (Aus)

Matthew Hayden broke the record for fastest World Cup century, taking 66 balls to notch up the hundred, and when he got out two balls later the run rate was still more than seven an over. A 161-run partnership between Ricky Ponting and Michael Clarke followed, with Ponting ending on 91 and Clarke on 92, and though Andrew Hall took wickets near the end, Australia finished on 377 for six.

South Africa batted through the first twenty overs without loss, as Abraham de Villiers and Graeme Smith took the opening bowlers on. De Villiers got out eight short of what would have been his first One-day International century, and a few overs later Smith retired hurt; he returned after Brad Hogg and Glenn McGrath had taken two wickets each and South Africa needed 118 in 55 balls. However, he got out four balls later, and the remainder of the batting order got out in single figures.
