= 2007 Cricket World Cup Super Eight stage =

The Super Eight stage of the 2007 Cricket World Cup was scheduled between 27 March 2007 and 21 April 2007, and determined the four qualifiers for the semi-finals of the tournament. Matches were held in Antigua, Bridgetown, Barbados, Georgetown, and Grenada.

Each team carried forward the result from the other team qualifying from its group in the group stage of the tournament, so the Super Eight was essentially an eight-team round robin competition. Two points were awarded for a win and one for a tie or a no result. If teams were tied on points, the team with the most wins was ranked ahead, and if this is also equal net run rate determined the ranking order.

== Table ==
The four top teams, depicted with green backgrounds in the table below, qualified for the semi-finals.

Pos	Team	Pld	W	L	T	NR	Pts	NRR
1	Australia	7	7	0	0	0	14	2.400
2	Sri Lanka	7	5	2	0	0	10	1.483
3	New Zealand	7	5	2	0	0	10	0.253
4	South Africa	7	4	3	0	0	8	0.313
5	England	7	3	4	0	0	6	−0.394
6	West Indies	7	2	5	0	0	4	−0.566
7	Bangladesh	7	1	6	0	0	2	−1.514
8	Ireland	7	1	6	0	0	2	−1.730

== Teams ==
Eight teams qualified from the group stage. India and Pakistan, ranked fifth and fourth in the ICC ODI Championship before the tournament began, were eliminated by Bangladesh and Ireland respectively. The other six seeded teams proceeded, with Australia beating the number one ranked team in the One Day International championship, South Africa. New Zealand, Sri Lanka and West Indies also carried one win forward from the group stage.

=== ICC ODI Championship rankings ===
These were the rankings as of 12 March, before the group stage began.

Ranking	Team	Points
1	South Africa	128
2	Australia	125
3	New Zealand	113
6	Sri Lanka	108
7	England	106
8	West Indies	101
9	Bangladesh	42
14	Ireland	0% / 44%

Note:Ireland did not have an official ODI ranking; they were ranked in this tournament based on their win percentage against associate members and then wins against full members.

== Matches ==
=== Australia vs West Indies ===
27–28 March 2007
Scorecard

Australia; 322/6 (50 overs)	v	West Indies; 219 (45.3 overs)
Matthew Hayden 158 (143); Dwayne Bravo 2/49 (7 overs)		Brian Lara 77 (83); Glenn McGrath 3/31 (8 overs)

Australia won by 103 runs
Sir Vivian Richards Stadium, North Sound
Umpires: Aleem Dar (Pak) and Asad Rauf (Pak)
Player of the match: Matthew Hayden (Aus)

- West Indies won the toss and elected to field.

Australia were put in to bat by Brian Lara as the ball moved about and deviated off the seam in the early overs. Daren Powell got the wicket of Adam Gilchrist with an inside edge, while Matthew Hayden could not score off his first 17 deliveries – then made 158 runs from the next 126 to make the highest innings for Australia in a World Cup match. However, Ricky Ponting and Hayden scored at above six an over in their partnership, before Ponting was eventually run out. Hayden added 98 for the third wicket with Michael Clarke before Dwayne Bravo broke through, and Andrew Symonds and Michael Hussey could not provide more than 15 runs to the team cause. Hussey got out the total at 234 for five in the 41st over, but Hayden eventually led Australia to break loose in the last 10 overs, taking 99 from them despite a 20-minute break for rain. Shane Watson's 33 from 26 balls also helped push Australia to 322 for 6 after the full 50 overs. This was the sixth successive score above 300 for Australia, a new One Day International record.

Drizzle and wet ground conditions delayed the start of West Indies' reply and the game was eventually abandoned to resume the following day. They lost three wickets in the first 20 overs, and though Brian Lara and Denesh Ramdin contributed fifties, they required 105 to win off 28 balls when Daren Powell was bowled by Shaun Tait. Earlier, Glenn McGrath had removed Chris Gayle, Marlon Samuels and Dwayne Bravo for single-figure scores, thus moving within one wicket of Wasim Akram's World Cup record.

This was the first international match at the new Sir Vivian Richards Stadium. The stadium was barely half-filled for the game, causing criticism from notables such as West Indies' captain Brian Lara and commentator Mark Nicholas.

=== Sri Lanka vs South Africa ===
28 March 2007
Scorecard

Sri Lanka; 209 (49.3 overs)	v	South Africa; 212/9 (48.2 overs)
Tillakaratne Dilshan 58 (76); Charl Langeveldt 5/39 (10 overs)		Jacques Kallis 86 (110); Lasith Malinga 4/54 (9.2 overs)

South Africa won by 1 wicket
Providence Stadium, Guyana
Umpires: Steve Bucknor (WI) and Daryl Harper (Aus)
Player of the match: Charl Langeveldt (SA) and Lasith Malinga (SL)

- Sri Lanka won the toss and elected to bat.

Sri Lanka won the toss and elected to bat, and lost their first five wickets for 98, with Charl Langeveldt taking two in his first spell. Tillakaratne Dilshan and Russel Arnold built a sixth-wicket stand of 97 in nearly 20 overs, but Dilshan was caught off Makhaya Ntini's bowling, and then Charl Langeveldt took three wickets in five balls as Sri Lanka were bowled out in the final over for 209. In reply, Chaminda Vaas had AB de Villiers bowled in the first over, but Jacques Kallis added 95 with Graeme Smith and 65 with Herschelle Gibbs, leading South Africa to within four runs of victory with his 86. Then Sri Lanka's Lasith Malinga struck. He became the first bowler to take four wickets with four consecutive deliveries in international cricket, though South Africa managed a run off Vaas in the intermediate over. South Africa now needed three runs to win with one wicket in hand, and eleven deliveries went by before Robin Peterson got an outside edge to a Malinga ball, which went out of reach of slip and went fine for four.

=== West Indies vs New Zealand ===
29 March 2007
Scorecard

West Indies; 177 (44.4 overs)	v	New Zealand; 179/3 (39.2 overs)
Chris Gayle 44 (56); Jacob Oram 3/23 (8 overs)		Scott Styris 80 (90); Daren Powell 2/39 (10 overs)

New Zealand won by 7 wickets
Sir Vivian Richards Stadium, North Sound
Umpires: Asad Rauf (Pak) and Rudi Koertzen (SA)
Player of the match: Jacob Oram (NZ)

- New Zealand won the toss and elected to field.

=== England vs Ireland ===
30 March 2007
Scorecard

England; 266/7 (50 overs)	v	Ireland; 218 (48.1 overs)
Paul Collingwood 90 (82); Boyd Rankin 2/28 (7 overs)		Niall O'Brien 63 (88); Andrew Flintoff 4/43 (8.1 overs)

England won by 48 runs
Providence Stadium, Guyana
Umpires: Billy Doctrove (WI) and Simon Taufel (Aus)
Player of the match: Paul Collingwood (Eng)

- England won the toss and elected to bat.

England won the toss and batted first, but lost both openers to Boyd Rankin in six overs, before Ian Bell spent 74 balls making his 31. When Bell got out, the run rate was slightly above 4; in the final 28 overs it was in excess of 6, with Paul Collingwood making 90, Kevin Pietersen 48 and Andrew Flintoff 43. Kyle McCallan was the most economical bowler for Ireland, and also took the wicket of Pietersen.

Chasing 267 in reply, Niall O'Brien's third One Day International fifty and his second of the World Cup helped Ireland to a total of 139 for six in the 37th over, but despite faster than a run a ball scores from Trent Johnston and Andrew White Ireland fell 48 runs short as Andrew Flintoff took the final two wickets, though they exceeded their previous World Cup record total by seven runs.

=== Bangladesh vs Australia ===
31 March 2007
Scorecard

Bangladesh; 104/6 (22 overs)	v	Australia; 106/0 (13.5 overs)
Mashrafe Mortaza 25* (17); Glenn McGrath 3/16 (5 overs)		Adam Gilchrist 59* (44)

Australia won by 10 wickets
Sir Vivian Richards Stadium, North Sound
Umpires: Aleem Dar (Pak) and Billy Bowden (NZ)
Player of the match: Glenn McGrath (Aus)

- Australia won the toss and elected to field.
- The match was shortened to 22 overs a side due to a wet outfield.

Glenn McGrath's three wickets took his tally in the history of the tournament to 56 surpassing Wasim Akram as the competition's leading wicket-taker.

=== Sri Lanka vs West Indies ===
1 April 2007
Scorecard

Sri Lanka; 303/5 (50 overs)	v	West Indies; 190 (44.3 overs)
Sanath Jayasuriya 115 (101); Daren Powell 2/38 (10 overs)		Shivnarine Chanderpaul 76 (110); Chaminda Vaas 2/19 (8 overs)

Sri Lanka won by 113 runs
Providence Stadium, Guyana
Umpires: Mark Benson (Eng) and Daryl Harper (Aus)
Player of the match: Sanath Jayasuriya (SL)

- West Indies won the toss and elected to field.

The start of the match was delayed due to bad weather, but a full 50-over match was played, which resulted in West Indies' third defeat in four days. Sanath Jayasuriya and Mahela Jayawardene added 183 for the third wicket, before Tillakaratne Dilshan came in and took 39 off 22 deliveries as the final eleven overs yielded 84 runs. In reply, West Indies needed 170 off 94 when Ramnaresh Sarwan was stumped off Sanath Jayasuriya; they only got 56 of those, and were bowled out for 190, with four batsmen out in single figures.

=== Bangladesh v New Zealand ===
2 April 2007
Scorecard

Bangladesh; 174 (48.3 overs)	v	New Zealand; 178/1 (29.2 overs)
Mohammad Rafique 30* (36); Scott Styris 4/43 (10 overs)		Stephen Fleming 102 (92); Syed Rasel 1/22 (7 overs)

New Zealand won by 9 wickets
Sir Vivian Richards Stadium, North Sound
Umpires: Aleem Dar (Pak) and Rudi Koertzen (SA)
Player of the match: Shane Bond (NZ)

- New Zealand won the toss and elected to field.

=== Ireland vs South Africa ===
3 April 2007
Scorecard

Ireland; 152/8 (35 overs)	v	South Africa; 165/3 (31.3 overs)
Andrew White 30 (30); Charl Langeveldt 3/41 (7 overs)		Jacques Kallis 66* (86); Boyd Rankin 2/26 (7 overs)

South Africa won by 7 wickets (D/L method)
Providence Stadium, Guyana
Umpires: Daryl Harper (Aus) and Simon Taufel (Aus)
Player of the match: Jacques Kallis (SA)

- South Africa won the toss and elected to field.
- Match shortened due to rain; Duckworth–Lewis revised target to win: 160 runs in 35 overs for South Africa.

=== Sri Lanka vs England ===
4 April 2007
Scorecard

Sri Lanka; 235 (50 overs)	v	England; 233/8 (50 overs)
Upul Tharanga 62 (103); Sajid Mahmood 4/50 (9 overs)		Kevin Pietersen 58 (80); Dilhara Fernando 3/41 (9 overs)

Sri Lanka won by 2 runs
Sir Vivian Richards Stadium, North Sound
Umpires: Asad Rauf (Pak) and Billy Bowden (NZ)
Player of the match: Ravi Bopara (Eng)

- England won the toss and elected to field.

Sri Lanka batted first and made 235, bowled out off the last ball with a run out. England lost their openers for 0 and 10, but Ian Bell and Kevin Pietersen made a stand of 90 for the third wicket, and Paul Collingwood joined Pietersen to add a further 25 before Pietersen was caught and bowled by Muttiah Muralitharan. England then lost two more wickets for seven runs to Dilhara Fernando, and required 103 off 16.3 overs with four wickets in hand. However, Ravi Bopara scored a half-century in his fourth One Day International innings, as he and Paul Nixon took England within three runs of victory. However, Fernando returned for the last over, and bowled Bopara off the last ball.

=== Bangladesh vs South Africa ===
7 April 2007
9:30
Scorecard

Bangladesh; 251/8 (50 overs)	v	South Africa; 184 (48.4 overs)
Mohammad Ashraful 87 (83); André Nel 5/45 (10 overs)		Herschelle Gibbs 56* (59); Abdur Razzak 3/25 (9.4 overs)

Bangladesh won by 67 runs
Providence Stadium, Guyana
Umpires: Mark Benson (Eng) and Billy Doctrove (WI)
Player of the match: Mohammad Ashraful (Ban)

- South Africa won the toss and elected to field.

=== England vs Australia ===
8 April 2007
Scorecard

England; 247 (49.5 overs)	v	Australia; 248/3 (47.2 overs)
Kevin Pietersen 104 (122); Nathan Bracken 3/33 (10 overs)		Ricky Ponting 86 (106); Andrew Flintoff 1/35 (10 overs)

Australia won by 7 wickets
Sir Vivian Richards Stadium, North Sound
Umpires: Billy Bowden (NZ) and Rudi Koertzen (SA)
Player of the match: Shaun Tait (Aus)

- England won the toss and elected to bat.

=== New Zealand vs Ireland ===
9 April 2007
Scorecard

New Zealand; 263/8 (50 overs)	v	Ireland; 134 (37.4 overs)
Peter Fulton 83 (110); Kyle McCallan 2/35 (10 overs)		Kevin O'Brien 49 (45); Daniel Vettori 4/23 (8.4 overs)

New Zealand won by 129 runs
Providence Stadium, Guyana
Umpires: Steve Bucknor (WI) and Simon Taufel (Aus)
Player of the match: Peter Fulton (NZ)

- New Zealand won the toss and elected to bat.

=== South Africa vs West Indies ===
10 April 2007
Scorecard

South Africa; 356/4 (50 overs)	v	West Indies; 289/9 (50 overs)
AB de Villiers 146 (130); Corey Collymore 2/41 (10 overs)		Ramnaresh Sarwan 92 (75); Shaun Pollock 2/33 (8 overs)

South Africa won by 67 runs
National Cricket Stadium, Grenada
Umpires: Mark Benson (Eng) and Daryl Harper (Aus)
Player of the match: AB de Villiers (SA)

- West Indies won the toss and elected to field.

=== Bangladesh vs England ===
11 April 2007
Scorecard

Bangladesh; 143 (37.2 overs)	v	England; 147/6 (44.5 overs)
Shakib Al Hasan 57* (95); Monty Panesar 3/25 (7 overs)		Michael Vaughan 30 (59); Syed Rasel 2/25 (10 overs)

England won by 4 wickets
Kensington Oval, Bridgetown
Umpires: Steve Bucknor (WI) and Simon Taufel (Aus)
Player of the match: Sajid Mahmood (Eng)

- England won the toss and elected to field.

=== New Zealand vs Sri Lanka ===
12 April 2007
Scorecard

New Zealand; 219/7 (50 overs)	v	Sri Lanka; 222/4 (45.1 overs)
Scott Styris 111* (157); Muttiah Muralitharan 3/32 (10 overs)		Kumar Sangakkara 69* (104); Daniel Vettori 2/35 (10 overs)

Sri Lanka won by 6 wickets
National Cricket Stadium, Grenada
Umpires: Asad Rauf (Pak) and Billy Doctrove (WI)
Player of the match: Chaminda Vaas (SL)

- New Zealand won the toss and elected to bat.

Despite missing top bowler Lasith Malinga due to injury, Sri Lanka won comfortably against New Zealand.

=== Ireland vs Australia ===
13 April 2007
Scorecard

Ireland; 91 (30 overs)	v	Australia; 92/1 (12.2 overs)
John Mooney 23 (44); Glenn McGrath 3/17 (7 overs)		Adam Gilchrist 34 (25); Trent Johnston 1/18 (3 overs)

Australia won by 9 wickets
Kensington Oval, Bridgetown
Umpires: Billy Bowden (NZ) and Rudi Koertzen (SA)
Player of the match: Glenn McGrath (Aus)

- Australia won the toss and elected to field.

Australia's win confirmed their place in the top four. Ireland could not now qualify for the semi-finals.

=== South Africa vs New Zealand ===
14 April 2007
Scorecard

South Africa; 193/7 (50 overs)	v	New Zealand; 196/5 (48.2 overs)
Herschelle Gibbs 60 (100); Craig McMillan 3/23 (5 overs)		Scott Styris 56 (84); André Nel 2/33 (9.2 overs)

New Zealand won by 5 wickets
National Cricket Stadium, Grenada
Umpires: Mark Benson (Eng) and Daryl Harper (Aus)
Player of the match: Craig McMillan (NZ)

- New Zealand won the toss and elected to field.

This win by New Zealand meant that they had qualified for the semi-finals. It also confirmed Sri Lanka's place in the top four, as only one other team below them could equal Sri Lanka's 8 points.

=== Ireland vs Bangladesh ===
15 April 2007
Scorecard

Ireland; 243/7 (50 overs)	v	Bangladesh; 169 (41.2 overs)
William Porterfield 85 (136); Mashrafe Mortaza 2/38 (10 overs)		Mohammad Ashraful 35 (36); Kyle McCallan 2/25 (8 overs)

Ireland won by 74 runs
Kensington Oval, Bridgetown
Umpires: Billy Bowden (NZ) and Steve Bucknor (WI)
Player of the match: William Porterfield (Ire)

- Ireland won the toss and elected to bat.

Ireland's total of 243/7 was their highest in World Cup matches. Bangladesh's loss meant that they could no longer qualify for the semi-finals.

=== Sri Lanka vs Australia ===
16 April 2007
Scorecard

Sri Lanka; 226 (49.4 overs)	v	Australia; 232/3 (42.4 overs)
Mahela Jayawardene 72 (88); Nathan Bracken 4/19 (9.4 overs)		Ricky Ponting 66* (80); Russel Arnold 2/20 (4 overs)

Australia won by 7 wickets
National Cricket Stadium, Grenada
Umpires: Aleem Dar (Pak) and Billy Doctrove (WI)
Player of the match: Nathan Bracken (Aus)

- Sri Lanka won the toss and elected to bat.

Australia were now guaranteed either first or second place in the Super 8s, and Sri Lanka could no longer get first place.

=== England vs South Africa ===
17 April 2007
Scorecard

England; 154 (48 overs)	v	South Africa; 157/1 (19.2 overs)
Andrew Strauss 46 (67); Andrew Hall 5/18 (10 overs)		Graeme Smith 89* (58); Andrew Flintoff 1/36 (6 overs)

South Africa won by 9 wickets
Kensington Oval, Bridgetown
Umpires: Steve Bucknor (WI) and Simon Taufel (Aus)
Player of the match: Andrew Hall (SA)

- England won the toss and elected to bat.

This result confirmed that South Africa had clinched one of the four semi-final places, and that England and the West Indies were unable to progress.

=== Ireland vs Sri Lanka ===
18 April 2007
Scorecard

Ireland; 77 (27.4 overs)	v	Sri Lanka; 81/2 (10 overs)
Jeremy Bray 20 (29); Muttiah Muralitharan 4/19 (5 overs)		Mahela Jayawardene 39* (27); Dave Langford-Smith 1/29 (3 overs)

Sri Lanka won by 8 wickets
National Cricket Stadium, Grenada
Umpires: Mark Benson (Eng) and Billy Doctrove (WI)
Player of the match: Farveez Maharoof (SL)

- Sri Lanka won the toss and elected to field.

=== West Indies vs Bangladesh ===
19 April 2007
Scorecard

West Indies; 230/5 (50 overs)	v	Bangladesh; 131 (43.5 overs)
Ramnaresh Sarwan 91* (90); Mashrafe Mortaza 1/39 (10 overs)		Mushfiqur Rahim 38* (75); Daren Powell 3/38 (10 overs)

West Indies won by 99 runs
Kensington Oval, Bridgetown
Umpires: Billy Bowden (NZ) and Rudi Koertzen (SA)
Player of the match: Ramnaresh Sarwan (WI)

- Bangladesh won the toss and elected to field.

=== Australia vs New Zealand ===
20 April 2007
Scorecard

Australia; 348/6 (50 overs)	v	New Zealand; 133 (25.5 overs)
Matthew Hayden 103 (100); James Franklin 3/74 (8 overs)		Peter Fulton 62 (72); Brad Hogg 4/29 (6.5 overs)

Australia won by 215 runs
National Cricket Stadium, Grenada
Umpires: Aleem Dar (Pak) and Asad Rauf (Pak)
Player of the match: Matthew Hayden (Aus)

- Australia won the toss and elected to bat.

Australia secured top place on the Super 8 table and a semi-final match-up with South Africa.

=== West Indies vs England ===
21 April 2007
Scorecard

West Indies; 300 (49.5 overs)	v	England; 301/9 (49.5 overs)
Chris Gayle 79 (58); Michael Vaughan 3/39 (10 overs)		Kevin Pietersen 100 (91); Dwayne Bravo 2/47 (9.5 overs)

England won by 1 wicket
Kensington Oval, Bridgetown
Umpires: Rudi Koertzen (SA) and Simon Taufel (Aus)
Player of the match: Kevin Pietersen (Eng)

- England won the toss and elected to field first.
