= 2007 Cricket World Cup Group D =

The 2007 Cricket World Cup, which was played in the West Indies from 13 March to 28 April 2007, featured 16 teams, who were divided into four groups. Group D featured the hosts, the West Indies, fellow full ICC members Pakistan and Zimbabwe, and associate members Ireland. The West Indies won all three of their matches to finish top of the group and qualify for the Super Eights. Ireland's rain-affected win over Pakistan in their second match, as well as their opening tie with Zimbabwe, meant they joined the West Indies in the next round, while Pakistan failed to qualify from the group stage for the second consecutive tournament.

== Table ==
Pos	Team	Pld	W	L	T	NR	Pts	NRR
1	West Indies	3	3	0	0	0	6	0.764
2	Ireland	3	1	1	1	0	3	−0.092
3	Pakistan	3	1	2	0	0	2	0.089
4	Zimbabwe	3	0	2	1	0	1	−0.886

Source: ESPNcricinfo

== West Indies vs Pakistan ==
13 March
Scorecard

West Indies; 241/9 (50 overs)	v	Pakistan; 187 (47.2 overs)
Marlon Samuels 63 (70); Iftikhar Anjum 3/44 (10 overs)		Shoaib Malik 62 (54); Dwayne Smith 3/36 (10 overs)

West Indies won by 54 runs
Sabina Park, Kingston
Umpires: Billy Bowden (NZ) and Simon Taufel (Aus)
Player of the match: Dwayne Smith (WI)

- Pakistan won the toss and elected to field.

Hosts West Indies won the opening match of the tournament, exacting revenge for the 3–1 series defeat in Pakistan the previous year. The local newspaper, the Jamaica Observer, said that the day "was as good as it [could] get." The Observer also pointed out that the result "will have provided a considerable advantage for West Indies" if, "as expected", they and Pakistan go through to the Super Eights. Cricinfo described the West Indies' efforts with the bat as "staccato", but credited "a disciplined bowling performance", while criticising Pakistan's bowlers for "let[ting] the batsmen dismantle their confidence."

After 28 overs, Pakistan were actually ahead of West Indies, with 97 for three compared to 94 for three; then Dwayne Smith took wickets with three of twelve deliveries, and Pakistan never got ahead again.

== Ireland vs Zimbabwe ==
15 March
Scorecard

Ireland; 221/9 (50 overs)	v	Zimbabwe; 221 (50 overs)
Jeremy Bray 115* (137); Elton Chigumbura 2/21 (6 overs)		Stuart Matsikenyeri 73* (76); Kyle McCallan 2/56 (9 overs)

Match tied
Sabina Park, Kingston
Umpires: Ian Gould (Eng) and Brian Jerling (SA)
Player of the match: Jeremy Bray (Ire)

- Zimbabwe won the toss and elected to field.

Ireland had a much better first outing than fellow World Cup debutants Bermuda, managing a tie against the Test nation of Zimbabwe after Jeremy Bray scored his second One Day International century in the space of six weeks. Bray put on 43 with Eoin Morgan for the second wicket, but two wickets from Elton Chigumbura set them back to 64 for four after 15 overs.

Bray remained in, however, carrying his bat to 115 not out and sharing partnerships of 54 with Andrew White, 37 with captain Trent Johnston and 39 with Dave Langford-Smith. Zimbabwe used spinners Prosper Utseya, Sean Williams and Stuart Matsikenyeri at the end, who conceded few runs, ending with combined figures of 56 runs from 17 overs. Chigumbura, who had taken the top order wickets, was not reintroduced at the death.

In reply, Zimbabwe made their way to 20 overs with the loss of one wicket, slightly ahead of Ireland's total. However, Johnston broke through when he had Chamu Chibhabha caught, while Vusi Sibanda crept back on the stumps, dismantling a bail to be out hit wicket for 67 as he took off to make a single, not realising his misfortune. Another misfortune struck when Brendan Taylor was run out, essentially by the batsmen on strike (Matsikenyeri) who returned McCallan's ball with a fierce straight drive, taking Taylor's wicket down in the process.

Nevertheless, after Stuart Matsikenyeri's half-century, they required 15 runs with 36 balls remaining; however, they only got six of those runs off the next 30 balls, with Gary Brent and Chris Mpofu rarely managing to get off the strike. Kevin O'Brien, whose only over had cost eight runs, was brought back in the 49th, and he took one wicket and had Mpofu run out in a maiden over. Zimbabwe now needed nine off the last over with only a wicket in hand. Matsikenyeri hit two twos and a single, Ed Rainsford got off the strike with a single off his only ball, before Matsikenyeri tied the scores with a cut for two. With one ball, one wicket and one run in contention, Rainsford's desperate dash caused him to be run out and the match a tie – the third of World Cup history.

== Ireland vs Pakistan ==
17 March
Scorecard

Pakistan; 132 (45.4 overs)	v	Ireland; 133/7 (41.4 overs)
Kamran Akmal 27 (47); Boyd Rankin 3/32 (9 overs)		Niall O'Brien 72 (107); Mohammad Sami 3/29 (10 overs)

Ireland won by 3 wickets (DLS method)
Sabina Park, Kingston
Umpires: Billy Bowden (NZ) and Brian Jerling (SA)
Player of the match: Niall O'Brien (Ire)

- Ireland won the toss and elected to field.
- Ireland inning reduced to 47 overs due to rain and
Ireland target was 128 runs in 47 overs

Pakistan, ranked fourth in the ICC ODI Championship tables before the tournament, were eliminated from the tournament after five days, an event described by BBC in an online report as "unthinkable". Niall O'Brien made 72, but was out stumped with 25 runs still to get and had to watch as his brother Kevin O'Brien and Trent Johnston put on 20 for the eighth wicket to win the game.

Pakistan were put in to bat, and were bowled out for 132, with extras being the top scorer as Ireland offered 23 wides. Pakistan's captain Inzamam-ul-Haq still credited Ireland's bowlers with bowling "tight lines", while taking the blame for "too many poor shots", as all ten batsmen were out caught. Boyd Rankin took the most wickets, including Younis Khan and top-scorer Kamran Akmal, while Andre Botha's spell of five runs from eight overs also yielded the wickets of Inzamam and opener Imran Nazir.

When Ireland batted, Bray, who had made a hundred in the previous match, fell lbw to Mohammad Sami, who took three for 29 after being left out of the side four days earlier. Ireland fell to 15 for two, but O'Brien and William Porterfield added 37 before Porterfield played a ball from Mohammad Hafeez onto his stumps and was bowled. O'Brien made shots off Hafeez, however, who ended with 15 runs off four overs, one of the three most expensive bowlers of the game. He was eventually stumped for 72, before Iftikhar Anjum struck twice in two balls, Ireland now needing 20 with three wickets in hand. Kevin O'Brien and Trent Johnston got there, however, with Ireland captain Johnston winning the game with a six, the second of the game.

Following the defeat and early exit from the World Cup, there was a huge negative reaction from the millions of passionate Pakistani fans and government, calling for the captain, coach and the president of the board to resign.

On the morning after the game, Pakistan's coach Bob Woolmer was found unconscious in his hotel room, and was taken to hospital, where he was pronounced dead soon afterwards. Players, experts and the rest of the cricketing world mourned the death of "the cricket scholar", in the words of former South African Test bowler Fanie de Villiers, while commentators such as Cricinfo's Dileep Premachandran criticised the "effigy-burners" in Pakistan who, in his opinion, did not "possess common sense". On the same day, Pakistani captain Inzamam-ul-Haq announced his retirement from one-day cricket.

== West Indies vs Zimbabwe ==
19 March
Scorecard

Zimbabwe; 202/5 (50 overs)	v	West Indies; 204/4 (47.5 overs)
Sean Williams 70* (88); Jerome Taylor 2/42 (10 overs)		Brian Lara 44* (68); Christopher Mpofu 1/34 (9 overs); Tawanda Mupariwa 1/34 (9 overs)

West Indies won by 6 wickets
Sabina Park, Kingston
Umpires: Ian Gould (Eng) and Simon Taufel (Aus)
Player of the match: Sean Williams (Zim)

- West Indies won the toss and elected to field.

== Pakistan vs Zimbabwe ==
21 March
Scorecard

Pakistan; 349 (49.5 overs)	v	Zimbabwe; 99 (19.1 overs)
Imran Nazir 160 (121); Elton Chigumbura 3/50 (6.5 overs)		Elton Chigumbura 27 (11); Shahid Afridi 3/20 (4 overs)

Pakistan won by 93 runs (DLS method)
Sabina Park, Kingston
Umpires: Brian Jerling (SA) and Simon Taufel (Aus)
Player of the match: Imran Nazir (Pak)

- Zimbabwe won the toss and elected to field.
- Zimbabwe target was 193 runs in 20 overs due to rain

Pakistan were considering forfeiting the game, but have been ordered to complete it by the chairman of the Pakistan Cricket Board. Imran Nazir led the way for Pakistan, an almost solo performance of 160 from just 121 balls as Pakistan made 349 all out, bowled out on the second last ball. No other players made 40; Inzamam-ul-Haq made 37 in his final One Day International, while number nine Iftikhar Anjum came in with four overs to spare and hit 32 from 16 balls before being last out to Elton Chigumbura.

Zimbabwe lost Vusi Sibanda, Justice Chibhabha and Friday Kasteni before rain arrived after 10.2 overs with the score at 33 for 3. Play eventually resumed with the innings cut to just 20 overs, leaving Zimbabwe with a reduced target, though they still needed a further 160 runs from 58 balls.

== West Indies v Ireland ==
23 March
Scorecard

Ireland; 183/8 (48 overs)	v	West Indies; 190/2 (38.1 overs)
Jeremy Bray 41 (72); Chris Gayle 2/23 (10 overs)		Shivnarine Chanderpaul 102* (113); Dave Langford-Smith 1/33 (9 overs)

West Indies won by 8 wickets (DLS method)
Sabina Park, Kingston
Umpires: Billy Bowden (NZ) and Ian Gould (Eng)
Player of the match: Shivnarine Chanderpaul (WI)

- Ireland won the toss and elected to bat.
- The match was reduced to 48 overs per side due to rain, West Indies target was 190 runs

The match was interrupted by rain near the end of Ireland's innings; West Indies were set an adjusted target of 190 from 48 overs.
