= 2022 ICC Awards =

International cricket award

- Date: 23–26 January 2023
- Presented by: International Cricket Council

Highlights
- Cricketer of the Year: Men's: (Pakistan) Babar Azam; Women's: (England) Nat Sciver
- Men's Test Cricketer of the Year: (England) Ben Stokes
- ODI Cricketer of the Year: Men's: (Pakistan) Babar Azam; Women's: (England) Nat Sciver
- T20I Cricketer of the Year: Men's: (India) Suryakumar Yadav; Women's: (Australia) Tahlia McGrath
- Emerging Player of the Year: Men's: (South Africa) Marco Jansen; Women's: (India) Renuka Singh Thakur
- Website: www.icc-cricket.com

The 2022 ICC Awards were the eighteenth edition of ICC Awards. The nominations took into account players' performance between 1 January 2022 and 31 December 2022.

== Winners and nominees ==
The shortlists of the nominations for individual award categories were announced from 28 to 30 December 2022.

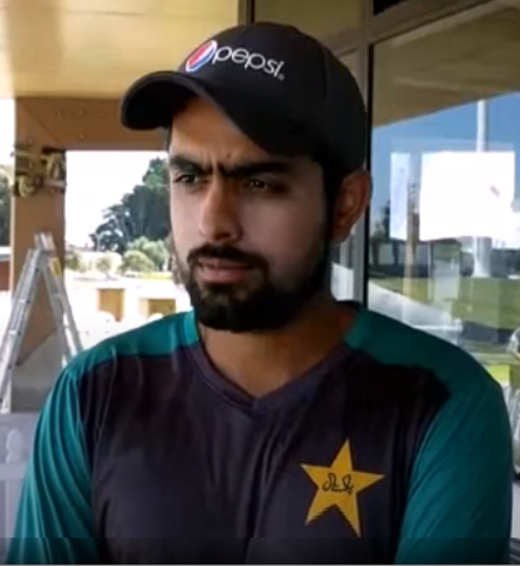
Babar Azam

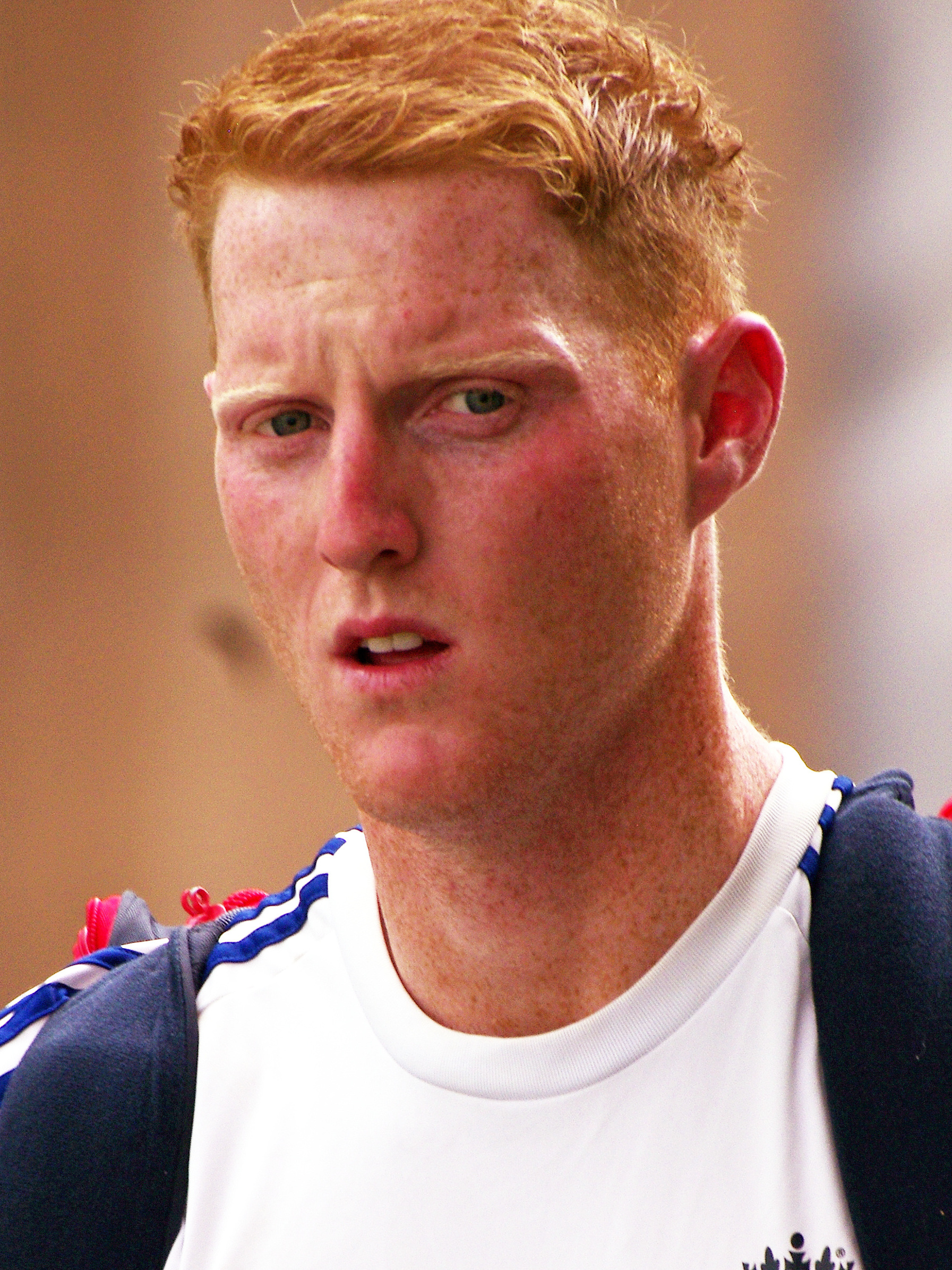
Ben Stokes

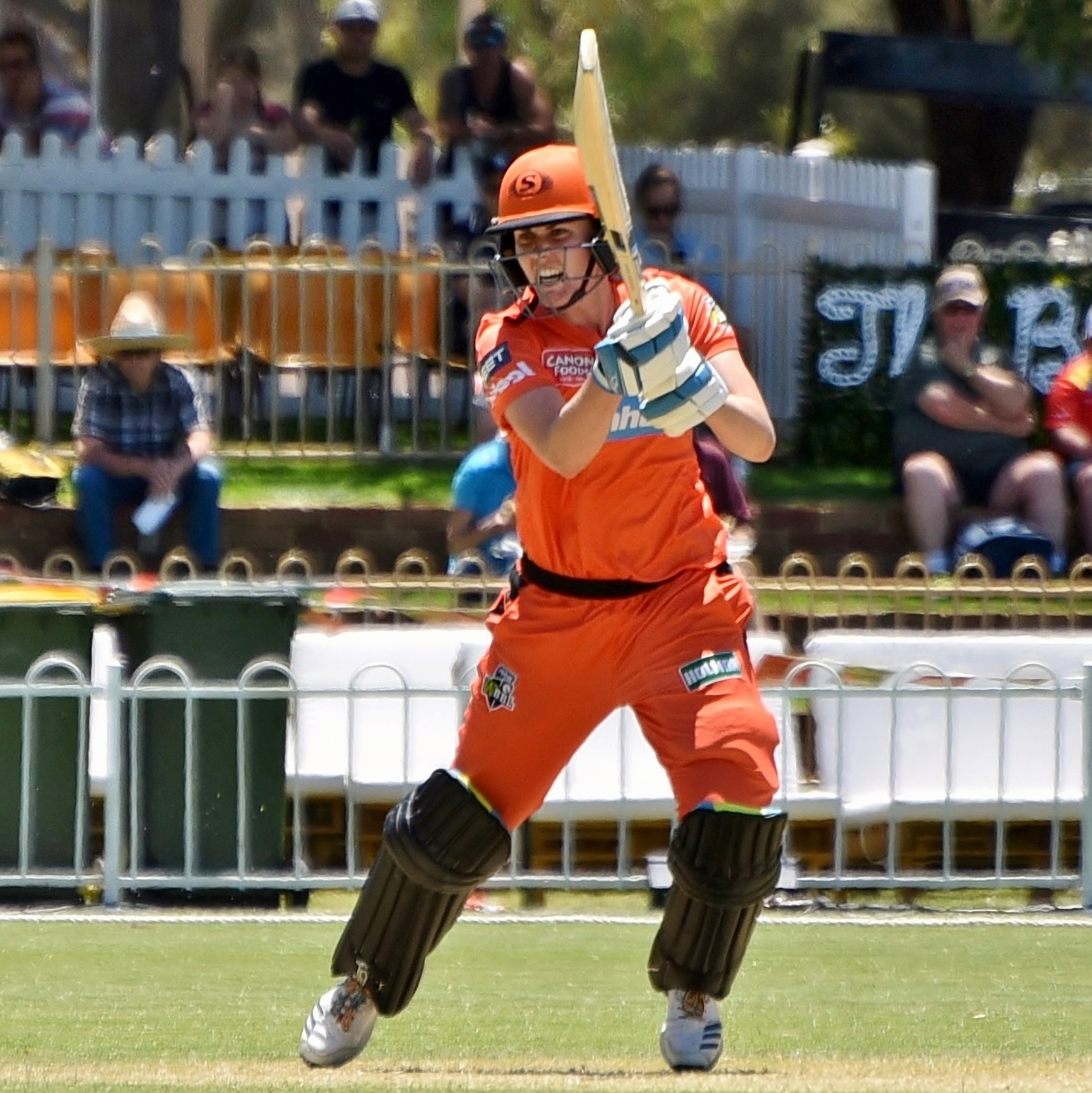
Nat Sciver

=== Men's awards ===
Men's Cricketer of the Year: (Pakistan) Babar Azam; (England) Ben Stokes; (Zimbabwe) Sikandar Raza; (New Zealand) Tim Southee	Men's Test Cricketer of the Year: (England) Ben Stokes; (England) Jonny Bairstow; (Australia) Usman Khawaja; (South Africa) Kagiso Rabada
Men's ODI Cricketer of the Year: (Pakistan) Babar Azam; (Australia) Adam Zampa; (Zimbabwe) Sikandar Raza; (Cricket West Indies) Shai Hope	Men's T20I Cricketer of the Year: (India) Suryakumar Yadav; (Zimbabwe) Sikandar Raza; (England) Sam Curran; (Pakistan) Mohammad Rizwan
Men's Emerging Cricketer of the Year: (South Africa) Marco Jansen; (Afghanistan) Ibrahim Zadran; (New Zealand) Finn Allen; (India) Arshdeep Singh	Men's Associate Cricketer of the Year: (Namibia) Gerhard Erasmus

=== Women's awards ===
Women's Cricketer of the Year: (England) Nat Sciver; (New Zealand) Amelia Kerr; (India) Smriti Mandhana; (Australia) Beth Mooney	Women's ODI Cricketer of the Year: (England) Nat Sciver; (South Africa) Shabnim Ismail; (New Zealand) Amelia Kerr; (Australia) Alyssa Healy
Women's T20I Cricketer of the Year: (Australia) Tahlia McGrath; (India) Smriti Mandhana; (Pakistan) Nida Dar; (New Zealand) Sophie Devine	Women's Emerging Cricketer of the Year: (India) Renuka Singh Thakur; (Australia) Darcie Brown; (England) Alice Capsey; (India) Yastika Bhatia
Women's Associate Cricketer of the Year: (United Arab Emirates) Esha Oza

=== Other awards ===
Umpire of the Year
- (England) Richard Illingworth
Spirit of Cricket
- (Nepal) Aasif Sheikh

=== ICC Teams of the Year ===
==== Men's teams ====
ICC Men's Test Team of the Year

ICC Men's Test Team of the Year
Batting position	Player	Team	Role
Opener	Usman Khawaja	Australia	Batsman
Opener	Kraigg Brathwaite	West Indies	Batsman
Number 3	Marnus Labuschagne	Australia	Batsman
Number 4	Babar Azam	Pakistan	Batsman
Number 5	Jonny Bairstow	England	Batsman
Number 6	Ben Stokes	England	All-rounder / Captain
Number 7	Rishabh Pant	India	Batsman / Wicket-keeper
Number 8	Pat Cummins	Australia	Bowler
Number 9	Kagiso Rabada	South Africa	Bowler
Number 10	Nathan Lyon	Australia	Bowler
Number 11	James Anderson	England	Bowler

ICC Men's ODI Team of the Year

ICC Men's ODI Team of the Year
Batting position	Player	Team	Role
Opener	Babar Azam	Pakistan	Batsman / Captain
Opener	Travis Head	Australia	Batsman
Number 3	Shai Hope	West Indies	Batsman
Number 4	Shreyas Iyer	India	Batsman
Number 5	Tom Latham	New Zealand	Batsman / Wicket-keeper
Number 6	Sikandar Raza	Zimbabwe	All-rounder
Number 7	Mehidy Hasan	Bangladesh	All-rounder
Number 8	Alzarri Joseph	West Indies	All-rounder
Number 9	Mohammed Siraj	India	Bowler
Number 10	Trent Boult	New Zealand	Bowler
Number 11	Adam Zampa	Australia	Bowler

ICC Men's T20I Team of the Year

ICC Men's T20I Team of the Year
Batting position	Player	Team	Role
Opener	Jos Buttler	England	Batsman / Captain / Wicket-keeper
Opener	Mohammad Rizwan	Pakistan	Batsman
Number 3	Virat Kohli	India	Batsman
Number 4	Suryakumar Yadav	India	Batsman
Number 5	Glenn Phillips	New Zealand	Batsman
Number 6	Sikandar Raza	Zimbabwe	All-rounder
Number 7	Hardik Pandya	India	All-rounder
Number 8	Sam Curran	England	All-rounder
Number 9	Wanindu Hasaranga	Sri Lanka	All-rounder
Number 10	Haris Rauf	Pakistan	Bowler
Number 11	Josh Little	Ireland	Bowler

==== Women's teams ====
ICC Women's ODI Team of the Year

ICC Women's ODI Team of the Year
Batting position	Player	Team	Role
Opener	Alyssa Healy	Australia	Batter / Wicket-keeper
Opener	Smriti Mandhana	India	Batter
Number 3	Laura Wolvaardt	South Africa	Batter
Number 4	Nat Sciver	England	All-rounder
Number 5	Beth Mooney	Australia	Batter
Number 6	Harmanpreet Kaur	India	All-rounder / Captain
Number 7	Amelia Kerr	New Zealand	All-rounder
Number 8	Sophie Ecclestone	England	Bowler
Number 9	Ayabonga Khaka	South Africa	Bowler
Number 10	Renuka Singh	India	Bowler
Number 11	Shabnim Ismail	South Africa	Bowler

ICC Women's T20I Team of the Year

ICC Women's T20I Team of the Year
Batting position	Player	Team	Role
Opener	Smriti Mandhana	India	Batter
Opener	Beth Mooney	Australia	Batter
Number 3	Sophie Devine	New Zealand	Batter / Captain
Number 4	Ash Gardner	Australia	All-rounder
Number 5	Tahila McGrath	Australia	All-rounder
Number 6	Nida Dar	Pakistan	All-rounder
Number 7	Deepti Sharma	India	All-rounder
Number 8	Richa Ghosh	India	Batter / Wicket-keeper
Number 9	Sophie Ecclestone	England	Bowler
Number 10	Inoka Ranaweera	Sri Lanka	Bowler
Number 11	Renuka Singh	India	Bowler
