= List of Pakistan Super League centuries =

Pakistan Super League is a professional Twenty20 cricket league, which is operated by Pakistan Cricket Board. It is contested by six franchises comprising cricketers from Pakistan and around the world.

A century is regarded as a landmark score for a batsman, achieved when he scores 100 or more runs in a single innings. His number of centuries is generally recorded in his career statistics.

== Centuries ==
Source: ESPNcricinfo

Year	Date	Score	Player	Team	Opposition	Venue	Result
2016	21 February	117	Sharjeel Khan (1/2)	Islamabad United	Peshawar Zalmi	Dubai International Cricket Stadium, Dubai	Islamabad won
2017	3 March	104	Kamran Akmal (1/3)	Peshawar Zalmi	Karachi Kings	Dubai International Cricket Stadium, Dubai	Peshawar won
2018	16 March	107*	Kamran Akmal (2/3)	Peshawar Zalmi	Lahore Qalandars	Sharjah Cricket Stadium, Sharjah	Peshawar won
2019	24 February	127*	Colin Ingram	Karachi Kings	Quetta Gladiators	Sharjah Cricket Stadium, Sharjah	Karachi won
2019	9 March	117*	Cameron Delport	Islamabad United	Lahore Qalandars	National Stadium, Karachi	Islamabad won
2020	22 February	101	Kamran Akmal (3/3)	Peshawar Zalmi	Quetta Gladiators	National Stadium, Karachi	Peshawar won
2020	29 February	100 *	Rilee Rossouw (1/3)	Multan Sultans	Quetta Gladiators	Multan Cricket Stadium, Multan	Multan won
2020	15 March	113 *	Chris Lynn	Lahore Qalandars	Multan Sultans	Gaddafi Stadium, Lahore	Lahore won
2021	24 February	105	Sharjeel Khan (2/2)	Karachi Kings	Islamabad United	National Stadium, Karachi	Islamabad won
2021	17 June	105 *	Usman Khawaja	Islamabad United	Peshawar Zalmi	Sheikh Zayed Cricket Stadium, Abu Dhabi	Islamabad won
2022	30 January	106	Fakhar Zaman (1/2)	Lahore Qalandars	Karachi Kings	National Stadium, Karachi	Lahore won
2022	7 February	116	Jason Roy (1/2)	Quetta Gladiators	Lahore Qalandars	National Stadium, Karachi	Quetta won
2022	19 February	102 *	Harry Brook	Lahore Qalandars	Islamabad United	Gaddafi Stadium, Lahore	Lahore won
2023	18 February	117	Martin Guptill	Quetta Gladiators	Karachi Kings	National Stadium, Karachi	Quetta won
2023	22 February	110 *	Mohammad Rizwan (1/2)	Multan Sultans	Karachi Kings	Multan Cricket Stadium, Multan	Multan won
2023	8 March	115	Babar Azam (1/3)	Peshawar Zalmi	Quetta Gladiators	Rawalpindi Cricket Stadium, Rawalpindi	Quetta won
2023	8 March	145 *	Jason Roy (2/2)	Quetta Gladiators	Peshawar Zalmi	Rawalpindi Cricket Stadium, Rawalpindi	Quetta won
2023	9 March	115	Fakhar Zaman (2/2)	Lahore Qalandars	Islamabad United	Rawalpindi Cricket Stadium, Rawalpindi	Lahore won
2023	10 March	121	Rilee Rossouw (2/3)	Multan Sultans	Peshawar Zalmi	Rawalpindi Cricket Stadium, Rawalpindi	Multan won
2023	11 March	120	Usman Khan (1/4)	Multan Sultans	Quetta Gladiators	Rawalpindi Cricket Stadium, Rawalpindi	Multan won
2024	25 February	104 *	Rassie van der Dussen	Lahore Qalandars	Peshawar Zalmi	Gaddafi Stadium, Lahore	Peshawar won
2024	26 February	111*	Babar Azam (2/3)	Peshawar Zalmi	Islamabad United	Gaddafi Stadium, Lahore	Peshawar won
2024	3 March	106*	Usman Khan (2/4)	Multan Sultans	Karachi Kings	National Stadium, Karachi	Multan won
2024	10 March	100*	Usman Khan (3/4)	Multan Sultans	Islamabad United	Rawalpindi Cricket Stadium, Rawalpindi	Islamabad won
2025	12 April	105*	Mohammad Rizwan (2/2)	Multan Sultans	Karachi Kings	National Stadium, Karachi	Karachi won
2025	12 April	101	James Vince	Karachi Kings	Multan Sultans	National Stadium, Karachi	Karachi won
2025	14 April	106	Sahibzada Farhan (1/2)	Islamabad United	Peshawar Zalmi	Rawalpindi Cricket Stadium, Rawalpindi	Islamabad won
2025	7 May	104	Rilee Rossouw (3/3)	Quetta Gladiators	Islamabad United	Rawalpindi Cricket Stadium, Rawalpindi	Quetta won
2025	7 May	100*	Hassan Nawaz	Quetta Gladiators	Islamabad United	Rawalpindi Cricket Stadium, Rawalpindi	Quetta won
2026	1 April	106*	Sahibzada Farhan (2/2)	Multan Sultans	Hyderabad Kingsmen	Gaddafi Stadium, Lahore	Multan won
2026	9 April	109	Kusal Mendis	Peshawar Zalmi	Karachi Kings	National Stadium, Karachi	Peshawar won
2026	19 April	100*	Babar Azam (3/3)	Peshawar Zalmi	Quetta Gladiators	National Stadium, Karachi	Peshawar won
2026	21 April	103	Fakhar Zaman (3/3)	Lahore Qalandars	Quetta Gladiators	Gaddafi Stadium, Lahore	Lahore won
2026	22 April	106	Steve Smith	Multan Sultans	Hyderabad Kingsmen	National Stadium, Karachi	Hyderabad won
2026	22 April	101	Usman Khan (4/4)	Hyderabad Kingsmen	Multan Sultans	National Stadium, Karachi	Hyderabad won
2026	28 April	103	Babar Azam (4/4)	Peshawar Zalmi	Islamabad United	National Stadium, Karachi	Peshawar won

== Season overview ==
Year	No. of centurions	No. of centuries	Highest score	Highest scorer
2016	1	1	117	Sharjeel Khan
2017	1	1	104	Kamran Akmal
2018	1	1	107*	Kamran Akmal
2019	2	2	127*	Colin Ingram
2020	3	3	113*	Chris Lynn
2021	2	2	105*	Usman Khawaja
2022	3	3	116	Jason Roy
2023	7	7	145*	Jason Roy
2024	3	4	111*	Babar Azam
2025	5	5	106*	Sahibzada Farhan

== Team overview ==
Team	No. of centurions	No. of centuries	Highest score	Highest scorer	Ref
Hyderabad Kingsmen	1	1	101	Usman Khan	
Islamabad United	4	4	117*	Cameron Delport	
Karachi Kings	3	3	127*	Colin Ingram	
Lahore Qalandars	3	4	115	Fakhar Zaman	
Multan Sultans	5	9	121	Rilee Rossouw	
Peshawar Zalmi	3	7	115	Babar Azam	
Quetta Gladiators	4	5	145*	Jason Roy	
Rawalpindiz	—N/a		83	Yasir Khan	

== See also ==
- List of Pakistan Super League records and statistics
