= ICC Men's T20I Team of the Year =

International cricket annual award

The ICC Men's T20I Team of the Year is an honour awarded each year by the International Cricket Council. It recognizes the top men's cricket players from around the world in the Twenty20 International format of the game. The team does not actually compete, but exists solely as an honorary entity.

== ICC Men's T20I Team of Year ==
=== Winners ===
Players marked bold won the ICC Men's T20I Cricketer of the Year in that respective year:

Year	No. 1	No. 2	No. 3	No. 4	No. 5	No. 6	No. 7	No. 8	No. 9	No. 10	No. 11
2021	(England) Jos Buttler	(Pakistan) Mohammad Rizwan (wk)	(Pakistan) Babar Azam (c)	(South Africa) Aiden Markram	(Australia) Mitchell Marsh	(South Africa) David Miller	(South Africa) Tabraiz Shamsi	(Australia) Josh Hazlewood	(Sri Lanka) Wanindu Hasaranga	(Bangladesh) Mustafizur Rahman	(Pakistan) Shaheen Afridi
2022	(England) Jos Buttler (c) (wk)	(Pakistan) Mohammad Rizwan	(India) Virat Kohli	(India) Suryakumar Yadav	(New Zealand) Glenn Phillips	(Zimbabwe) Sikandar Raza	(India) Hardik Pandya	(England) Sam Curran	(Sri Lanka) Wanindu Hasaranga	(Pakistan) Haris Rauf	(Ireland) Josh Little
2023	(India) Yashasvi Jaiswal	(England) Phil Salt	(Cricket West Indies) Nicholas Pooran (wk)	(India) Suryakumar Yadav (c)	(New Zealand) Mark Chapman	(Zimbabwe) Sikandar Raza	(Uganda) Alpesh Ramjani	(Ireland) Mark Adair	(India) Ravi Bishnoi	(Zimbabwe) Richard Ngarava	(India) Arshdeep Singh
2024	(India) Rohit Sharma (c)	(Australia) Travis Head	(England) Phil Salt	(Pakistan) Babar Azam	(Cricket West Indies) Nicholas Pooran (wk)	(Zimbabwe) Sikandar Raza	(India) Hardik Pandya	(Afghanistan) Rashid Khan	(Sri Lanka) Wanindu Hasaranga	(India) Jasprit Bumrah	(India) Arshdeep Singh

== Superlatives ==
=== Appearances by player ===
Players marked bold are still active in ODI matches and years marked bold indicate they won the ICC Men's T20I Cricketer of the Year in that respective year:

Player	Team	Appearances	Years
Wanindu Hasaranga	Sri Lanka	3	2021, 2022, 2024
Sikandar Raza	Zimbabwe	3	2022, 2023, 2024
Mohammad Rizwan	Pakistan	2	**2021**, 2022
Jos Buttler	England	2	2021, 2022
Suryakumar Yadav	India	2	**2022**, **2023**
Babar Azam	Pakistan	2	2021, 2024
Hardik Pandya	India	2	2022, 2024
Arshdeep Singh	India	2	2023, **2024**

=== Appearances by nation ===
Country	2021	2022	2023	2024	Total
India		3	4	4	11
Pakistan	3	2		1	6
England	1	2	1	1	5
Zimbabwe		1	2	1	4
Australia	2			1	3
South Africa	3				3
Sri Lanka	1	1		1	3
Ireland		1	1		2
New Zealand		1	1		2
West Indies			1	1	2
Afghanistan				1	1
Bangladesh	1				1
Uganda			1		1

== See also ==
- ICC Awards
- Sir Garfield Sobers Trophy (Men's Cricketer of the Year)
- ICC Men's Test Team of the Year
- ICC Men's Test Cricketer of the Year
- ICC Men's ODI Cricketer of the Year
- David Shepherd Trophy (Umpire of the Year)
- ICC Women's Cricketer of the Year
- ICC Women's ODI Team of the Year
- ICC Women's T20I Team of the Year
