= List of Indian Premier League seasons and results =

Indian Premier League (IPL)
- Countries: India
- Administrator: IPL Governing Council, BCCI
- Format: Twenty20
- First edition: 2008
- Latest edition: 2026
- Next edition: 2027
- Tournament format: Group Stage and Playoffs
- Number of teams: 10
- Current champion: Royal Challengers Bengaluru (2nd title)
- Most successful: Chennai Super Kings, Mumbai Indians (5 titles each)
- Most runs: Virat Kohli (9336)
- Most wickets: Yuzvendra Chahal (233)
- TV: List of broadcasters
- Website: iplt20.com

The Indian Premier League (IPL) is a domestic, annual Twenty20 cricket tournament played in India since 2008. It is organized by the IPL Governing Council, under the aegis of the Board of Control for Cricket in India (BCCI). It is the most watched Twenty20 tournament, and the second-best-paying sporting league globally.

As of 2026, the IPL consists of ten teams representing ten cities across India. Overall fifteen teams have played across the past seasons of the tournament, with five becoming defunct later. Eight franchises took part in the inaugural edition in 2008. Ahead of the 2011 season, Kochi Tuskers and Pune Warriors joined the league. Kochi Tuskers was terminated after a single season by the BCCI for contractual breach. After the 2012 season, Deccan Chargers ceased to exist and was replaced by Sunrisers Hyderabad for the next season. After the 2013 season, Pune Warriors India exited the IPL after it had a franchise valuation disagreement with the BCCI. Chennai Super Kings and Rajasthan Royals were suspended for two seasons in 2016 and 2017 following a betting case, and was replaced by two new teams– Gujarat Lions and Rising Pune Supergiants for the two seasons. The suspended franchises returned to compete in the 2018 season. Ahead of the 2022 season, two new teams–Gujarat Titans and Lucknow Super Giants were added to the competition.

As of 2026, there have been nineteen seasons of the tournament. The inaugural IPL season was won by Rajasthan Royals. Chennai Super Kings and Mumbai Indians are the most successful franchises with five titles each. Kolkata Knight Riders have won three titles. Royal Challengers Bengaluru have won two titles, while Gujarat Titans, Sunrisers Hyderabad, Rajasthan Royals, Deccan Chargers have won one title each.

Up until the 2021 season, an IPL tournament involved each team playing every other team twice in a home-and-away, double round-robin format. Since 2022, the ten teams are divided into two groups of five teams as determined by a random draw. Each team plays two matches against the other four teams in their group and a randomly chosen team from the other group, while playing a single match against the other four teams. Basis the points accumulated in the group stage, the top four teams qualify for the playoffs. In the playoffs, the top two teams from the group stage compete with each other in the first qualifier and the winner qualifies directly for the final. The loser of the qualifier competes with the winner of an eliminator match between the third and fourth placed teams, to determine the other finalist. The team that wins the final is crowned the champion.

== Season results ==
Season	Final				Teams	Matches	Player of the tournament
Season	Winner	Winning margin	Runner-up	Venue	Teams	Matches	Player of the tournament
2008	Rajasthan Royals; 164/7 (20 overs)	3 wickets	Chennai Super Kings; 163/5 (20 overs)	DY Patil Stadium	8	59	(Australia) Shane Watson
2009	Deccan Chargers; 143/6 (20 overs)	6 runs	Royal Challengers Bangalore; 137/9 (20 overs)	Wanderers Stadium	8	59	(Australia) Adam Gilchrist
2010	Chennai Super Kings; 168/5 (20 overs)	22 runs	Mumbai Indians; 146/9 (20 overs)	DY Patil Stadium	8	60	(India) Sachin Tendulkar
2011	Chennai Super Kings (2); 205/5 (20 overs)	58 runs	Royal Challengers Bangalore; 147/8 (20 overs)	M. A. Chidambaram Stadium	10	74	(Cricket West Indies) Chris Gayle
2012	Kolkata Knight Riders; 192/5 (19.4 overs)	5 wickets	Chennai Super Kings; 190/3 (20 overs)	M. A. Chidambaram Stadium	9	76	(Cricket West Indies) Sunil Narine
2013	Mumbai Indians; 148/9 (20 overs)	23 runs	Chennai Super Kings; 125/9 (20 overs)	Eden Gardens	9	76	(Australia) Shane Watson
2014	Kolkata Knight Riders (2); 200/7 (19.3 overs)	3 wickets	Punjab Kings; 199/4 (20 overs)	M. Chinnaswamy Stadium	8	60	(Australia) Glenn Maxwell
2015	Mumbai Indians (2); 202/5 (20 overs)	41 runs	Chennai Super Kings; 161/8 (20 overs)	Eden Gardens	8	60	(Cricket West Indies) Andre Russell
2016	Sunrisers Hyderabad; 208/7 (20 overs)	8 runs	Royal Challengers Bangalore; 200/7 (20 overs)	M. Chinnaswamy Stadium	8	60	(India) Virat Kohli
2017	Mumbai Indians (3); 129/8 (20 overs)	1 run	Rising Pune Supergiant; 128/6 (20 overs)	Rajiv Gandhi International Cricket Stadium	8	60	(England) Ben Stokes
2018	Chennai Super Kings (3); 181/2 (18.3 overs)	8 wickets	Sunrisers Hyderabad; 178/6 (20.0 overs)	Wankhede Stadium	8	60	(Cricket West Indies) Sunil Narine
2019	Mumbai Indians (4); 149/8 (20 overs)	1 run	Chennai Super Kings; 148/7 (20 overs)	Rajiv Gandhi International Cricket Stadium	8	60	(Cricket West Indies) Andre Russell
2020	Mumbai Indians (5); 157/5 (18.4 overs)	5 wickets	Delhi Capitals; 156/7 (20 overs)	Dubai International Cricket Stadium	8	60	(England) Jofra Archer
2021	Chennai Super Kings (4); 192/3 (20 overs)	27 runs	Kolkata Knight Riders; 165/9 (20 overs)	Dubai International Cricket Stadium	8	60	(India) Harshal Patel
2022	Gujarat Titans; 133/3 (18.1 overs)	7 wickets	Rajasthan Royals; 130/9 (20 overs)	Narendra Modi Stadium	10	74	(England) Jos Buttler
2023	Chennai Super Kings (5); 171/5 (15 overs)	5 wickets DLS	Gujarat Titans; 214/4 (20 overs)	Narendra Modi Stadium	10	74	(India) Shubman Gill
2024	Kolkata Knight Riders (3); 114/2 (10.3 overs)	8 wickets	Sunrisers Hyderabad; 113 (18.3 overs)	M. A. Chidambaram Stadium	10	74	(Cricket West Indies) Sunil Narine
2025	Royal Challengers Bengaluru; 190/9 (20 overs)	6 runs	Punjab Kings; 184/7 (20 overs)	Narendra Modi Stadium	10	74	(India) Suryakumar Yadav
2026	Royal Challengers Bengaluru (2); 161/5 (18 overs)	5 wickets	Gujarat Titans; 154/8 (20 overs)	Narendra Modi Stadium	10	74	(India) Vaibhav Sooryavanshi

== Team results ==
Season	2008	2009	2010	2011	2012	2013	2014	2015	2016	2017	2018	2019	2020	2021	2022	2023	2024	2025	2026
Teams	8			10	9		8								10				
Chennai Super Kings	2nd	SF	1st	1st	2nd	2nd	3rd	2nd	Suspended		1st	2nd	7th	1st	9th	1st	5th	10th	8th
Delhi Daredevils / Delhi Capitals	SF	SF	5th	10th	3rd	9th	8th	7th	6th	6th	8th	3rd	2nd	3rd	5th	5th	9th	5th	6th
Kolkata Knight Riders	6th	8th	6th	4th	1st	7th	1st	5th	4th	3rd	3rd	5th	5th	2nd	7th	7th	1st	8th	7th
Mumbai Indians	5th	7th	2nd	3rd	4th	1st	4th	1st	5th	1st	5th	1st	1st	5th	10th	3rd	10th	3rd	9th
Kings XI Punjab / Punjab Kings	SF	5th	8th	5th	6th	6th	2nd	8th	8th	5th	7th	6th	6th	6th	6th	8th	9th	2nd	5th
Rajasthan Royals	1st	6th	7th	6th	7th	3rd	5th	4th	Suspended		4th	7th	8th	7th	2nd	5th	3rd	9th	3rd
Royal Challengers Bangalore	7th	2nd	3rd	2nd	5th	5th	7th	3rd	2nd	8th	6th	8th	4th	4th	3rd	6th	4th	1st	1st
Sunrisers Hyderabad	Team did not exist					4th	6th	6th	1st	4th	2nd	4th	3rd	8th	8th	10th	2nd	6th	4th
Gujarat Titans	Team did not exist														1st	2nd	8th	4th	2nd
Lucknow Super Giants	Team did not exist														4th	4th	7th	7th	10th
Deccan Chargers^{[†]}	8th	1st	4th	7th	8th	Team defunct													
Gujarat Lions^{[†]}	Team did not exist								3rd	7th	Team defunct								
Kochi Tuskers Kerala^{[†]}	Team did not exist			8th	Team defunct														
Pune Warriors India^{[†]}	Team did not exist			9th	9th	8th	Team defunct												
Rising Pune Supergiant^{[†]}	Team did not exist								7th	2nd	Team defunct								
Source: Indian Premier League

^{†} Team defunct

Team statistics
Team	Best result	Titles	Seasons	First appearance	Latest appearance	Playoff appearances
Chennai Super Kings	Champions (2010, 2011, 2018, 2021, 2023)	5	17	2008	2026	12
Mumbai Indians	Champions (2013, 2015, 2017, 2019, 2020)	5	19	2008	2026	11
Kolkata Knight Riders	Champions (2012, 2014, 2024)	3	19	2008	2026	8
Royal Challengers Bangalore	Champions (2025, 2026)	2	19	2008	2026	11
Rajasthan Royals	Champions (2008)	1	17	2008	2026	8
Sunrisers Hyderabad	Champions (2016)	1	14	2013	2026	8
Gujarat Titans	Champions (2022)	1	5	2022	2026	4
Deccan Chargers^{[†]}	Champions (2009)	1	5	2008	2012	2
Punjab Kings	Runners-up (2014, 2025)	0	19	2008	2026	3
Delhi Capitals	Runners-up (2020)	0	19	2008	2026	6
Rising Pune Supergiant^{[†]}	Runners-up (2017)	0	2	2016	2017	1
Gujarat Lions^{[†]}	3rd (2016)	0	3	2016	2026	1
Lucknow Super Giants	4th (2022, 2023)	0	5	2022	2026	2
Kochi Tuskers Kerala^{[†]}	8th (2011)	0	1	2011	2011	0
Pune Warriors India^{[†]}	8th (2013)	0	3	2011	2013	0

^{†} Team defunct

== See also ==
- List of Indian Premier League records and statistics
- List of Indian Premier League captains
- List of Indian Premier League centuries
- List of Indian Premier League five-wicket hauls
