= ICC Men's ODI Team of the Year =

International cricket annual award

The ICC Men's ODI Team of the Year is an honour awarded each year by the International Cricket Council. It recognizes the top cricket players from around the world in the ODI format of the game. The team does not actually compete, but exists solely as an honorary entity.

== Annual selections ==
Players marked bold won the ICC Men's ODI Cricketer of the Year in that respective year:

Year	No. 1	No. 2	No. 3	No. 4	No. 5	No. 6	No. 7	No. 8	No. 9	No. 10	No. 11	12th Man
2004	(Australia) Adam Gilchrist (wk)	(India) Sachin Tendulkar	(Cricket West Indies) Chris Gayle	(Australia) Ricky Ponting (c)	(Cricket West Indies) Brian Lara	(India) Virender Sehwag	(South Africa) Jacques Kallis	(England) Andrew Flintoff	(South Africa) Shaun Pollock	(Sri Lanka) Chaminda Vaas	(Australia) Jason Gillespie	
2005	(Sri Lanka) Marvan Atapattu (c)	(Australia) Adam Gilchrist (wk)	(India) Rahul Dravid	(England) Kevin Pietersen	(Pakistan) Inzamam-ul-Haq	(England) Andrew Flintoff	(Australia) Andrew Symonds	(New Zealand) Daniel Vettori	(Australia) Brett Lee	(Pakistan) Naved-ul-Hasan	(Australia) Glenn McGrath	(South Africa) Jacques Kallis
2006	(Australia) Adam Gilchrist (wk)	(India) MS Dhoni	(Australia) Ricky Ponting	(Sri Lanka) Mahela Jayawardene (c)	(India) Yuvraj Singh	(Australia) Michael Hussey	(England) Andrew Flintoff	(India) Irfan Pathan	(Australia) Brett Lee	(New Zealand) Shane Bond	(Sri Lanka) Muttiah Muralitharan	(Australia) Andrew Symonds
2007	(Australia) Matthew Hayden	(India) Sachin Tendulkar	(Australia) Ricky Ponting (c)	(England) Kevin Pietersen	(Cricket West Indies) Shivnarine Chanderpaul	(South Africa) Jacques Kallis	(South Africa) Mark Boucher (wk)	(Sri Lanka) Chaminda Vaas	(New Zealand) Shane Bond	(Sri Lanka) Muttiah Muralitharan	(Australia) Glenn McGrath	(Australia) Michael Hussey
2008	(South Africa) Herschelle Gibbs	(India) Sachin Tendulkar	(Australia) Ricky Ponting (c)	(Pakistan) Younis Khan	(Australia) Andrew Symonds	(India) MS Dhoni (wk)	(Sri Lanka) Farveez Maharoof	(New Zealand) Daniel Vettori	(Australia) Brett Lee	(Australia) Mitchell Johnson	(Australia) Nathan Bracken	(Pakistan) Salman Butt
2009	(India) Virender Sehwag	(Cricket West Indies) Chris Gayle	(England) Kevin Pietersen	(Sri Lanka) Tillakaratne Dilshan	(India) Yuvraj Singh	(New Zealand) Martin Guptill	(India) MS Dhoni (c/wk)	(England) Andrew Flintoff	(Sri Lanka) Nuwan Kulasekara	(Sri Lanka) Ajantha Mendis	(Pakistan) Umar Gul	(Sri Lanka) Thilan Thushara
2010	(India) Sachin Tendulkar	(Australia) Shane Watson	(Australia) Michael Hussey	(South Africa) AB de Villiers	(England) Paul Collingwood	(Australia) Ricky Ponting (c)	(India) MS Dhoni (wk)	(New Zealand) Daniel Vettori	(England) Stuart Broad	(Australia) Doug Bollinger	(Australia) Ryan Harris	
2011	(Sri Lanka) Tillakaratne Dilshan	(India) Virender Sehwag	(Sri Lanka) Kumar Sangakkara	(South Africa) AB de Villiers	(Australia) Shane Watson	(India) Yuvraj Singh	(India) MS Dhoni (c/wk)	(England) Graeme Swann	(Pakistan) Umar Gul	(South Africa) Dale Steyn	(India) Zaheer Khan	(Sri Lanka) Lasith Malinga
2012	(India) Gautam Gambhir	(England) Alastair Cook	(Sri Lanka) Kumar Sangakkara	(India) Virat Kohli	(India) MS Dhoni (c/wk)	(Australia) Michael Clarke	(Pakistan) Shahid Afridi	(South Africa) Morné Morkel	(England) Steven Finn	(Sri Lanka) Lasith Malinga	(Pakistan) Saeed Ajmal	(Australia) Shane Watson
2013	(Sri Lanka) Tillakaratne Dilshan	(India) Shikhar Dhawan	(South Africa) Hashim Amla	(Sri Lanka) Kumar Sangakkara	(South Africa) AB de Villiers	(India) MS Dhoni (c/wk)	(India) Ravindra Jadeja	(Pakistan) Saeed Ajmal	(Australia) Mitchell Starc	(England) James Anderson	(Sri Lanka) Lasith Malinga	(New Zealand) Mitchell McClenaghan
2014	(Pakistan) Mohammad Hafeez	(South Africa) Quinton de Kock	(India) Virat Kohli	(Australia) George Bailey	(South Africa) AB de Villiers	(India) MS Dhoni (c/wk)	(Cricket West Indies) Dwayne Bravo	(Australia) James Faulkner	(South Africa) Dale Steyn	(India) Mohammed Shami	(Sri Lanka) Ajantha Mendis	(India) Rohit Sharma
2015	(Sri Lanka) Tillakaratne Dilshan	(South Africa) Hashim Amla	(Sri Lanka) Kumar Sangakkara (wk)	(South Africa) AB de Villiers (c)	(Australia) Steve Smith	(New Zealand) Ross Taylor	(New Zealand) Trent Boult	(India) Mohammed Shami	(Australia) Mitchell Starc	(Bangladesh) Mustafizur Rahman	(South Africa) Imran Tahir	(England) Joe Root
2016	(Australia) David Warner	(South Africa) Quinton de Kock (wk)	(India) Rohit Sharma	(India) Virat Kohli (c)	(South Africa) AB de Villiers	(England) Jos Buttler	(Australia) Mitchell Marsh	(India) Ravindra Jadeja	(Australia) Mitchell Starc	(South Africa) Kagiso Rabada	(Cricket West Indies) Sunil Narine	(South Africa) Imran Tahir
2017	(Australia) David Warner	(India) Rohit Sharma	(India) Virat Kohli (c)	(Pakistan) Babar Azam	(South Africa) AB de Villiers	(South Africa) Quinton de Kock (wk)	(England) Ben Stokes	(New Zealand) Trent Boult	(Pakistan) Hasan Ali	(Afghanistan) Rashid Khan	(India) Jasprit Bumrah	
2018	(India) Rohit Sharma	(England) Jonny Bairstow	(India) Virat Kohli (c)	(England) Joe Root	(New Zealand) Ross Taylor	(England) Jos Buttler (wk)	(England) Ben Stokes	(Bangladesh) Mustafizur Rahman	(Afghanistan) Rashid Khan	(India) Kuldeep Yadav	(India) Jasprit Bumrah	
2019	(India) Rohit Sharma	(Cricket West Indies) Shai Hope	(India) Virat Kohli (c)	(Pakistan) Babar Azam	(New Zealand) Kane Williamson	(England) Ben Stokes	(England) Jos Buttler (wk)	(Australia) Mitchell Starc	(New Zealand) Trent Boult	(India) Mohammed Shami	(India) Kuldeep Yadav	
2021	(Ireland) Paul Stirling	(South Africa) Janneman Malan	(Pakistan) Babar Azam (c)	(Pakistan) Fakhar Zaman	(South Africa) Rassie van der Dussen	(Bangladesh) Shakib Al Hasan	(Bangladesh) Mushfiqur Rahim (wk)	(Sri Lanka) Wanindu Hasaranga	(Bangladesh) Mustafizur Rahman	(Ireland) Simi Singh	(Sri Lanka) Dushmantha Chameera	
2022	(Pakistan) Babar Azam (c)	(Australia) Travis Head	(Cricket West Indies) Shai Hope	(India) Shreyas Iyer	(New Zealand) Tom Latham (wk)	(Zimbabwe) Sikandar Raza	(Bangladesh) Mehidy Hasan	(Cricket West Indies) Alzarri Joseph	(India) Mohammed Siraj	(New Zealand) Trent Boult	(Australia) Adam Zampa	
2023	(India) Rohit Sharma (c)	(India) Shubman Gill	(Australia) Travis Head	(India) Virat Kohli	(New Zealand) Daryl Mitchell	(South Africa) Heinrich Klassen (wk)	(South Africa) Marco Jansen	(Australia) Adam Zampa	(India) Mohammad Siraj	(India) Kuldeep Yadav	(India) Mohammad Shami	
2024	(Pakistan) Saim Ayub	(Afghanistan) Rahmanullah Gurbaz	(Sri Lanka) Pathum Nissanka	(Sri Lanka) Kusal Mendis (wk)	(Sri Lanka) Charith Asalanka (c)	(Cricket West Indies) Sherfane Rutherford	(Afghanistan) Azmatullah Omarzai	(Sri Lanka) Wanindu Hasaranga	(Pakistan) Shaheen Shah Afridi	(Pakistan) Haris Rauf	(Afghanistan) Allah Mohammad Ghazanfar	

== Multiple selections ==
Players marked bold are still active in ODI matches and years marked bold indicate they won the ICC Men's ODI Cricketer of the Year in that respective year:

#	Player	Team	Appearances	First XI	12th man	Years
1	MS Dhoni	India	8	8	0	2006, **2008**, **2009**, 2010, 2011, 2012, 2013, 2014
2	**Virat Kohli**	India	7	7	0	**2012**, 2014, 2016, **2017**, **2018**, 2019, **2023**
2	AB de Villiers	South Africa	7	7	0	**2010**, 2011, 2013, **2014**, **2015**, 2016, 2017
3	**Rohit Sharma**	India	6	5	1	2014, 2016, 2017, 2018, **2019**, 2023
4	Ricky Ponting	Australia	5	5	0	2004, 2006, 2007, 2008, 2010
5	**Mitchell Starc**	Australia	4	4	0	2013, 2015, 2016, 2019
5	Andrew Flintoff	England	4	4	0	**2004**, 2005, 2006, 2009
5	Sachin Tendulkar	India	4	4	0	2004, 2007, 2008, 2010
5	**Mohammed Shami**	India	4	4	0	2014, 2015, 2019, 2023
5	Trent Boult	New Zealand	4	4	0	2015, 2017, 2019, 2022
5	**Babar Azam**	Pakistan	4	4	0	2017, 2019, **2021**, **2022**
5	Tillakaratne Dilshan	Sri Lanka	4	4	0	2009, 2011, 2013, 2015
5	Kumar Sangakkara	Sri Lanka	4	4	0	**2011**, 2012, **2013**, 2015
6	Adam Gilchrist	Australia	3	3	0	2004, 2005, 2006
6	Brett Lee	Australia	3	3	0	2005, 2006, 2008
6	**Mustafizur Rahman**	Bangladesh	3	3	0	2015, 2018, 2021
6	**Jos Buttler**	England	3	3	0	2016, 2018, 2019
6	Kevin Pietersen	England	3	3	0	**2005**, 2007, 2009
6	**Ben Stokes**	England	3	3	0	2017, 2018, 2019
6	Virender Sehwag	India	3	3	0	2004, 2009, 2011
6	Yuvraj Singh	India	3	3	0	2006, 2009, 2011
6	**Kuldeep Yadav**	India	3	3	0	2018, 2019, 2023
6	Daniel Vettori	New Zealand	3	3	0	2005, 2008, 2010
6	Quinton de Kock	South Africa	3	3	0	2014, **2016**, 2017
6	Michael Hussey	Australia	3	2	1	**2006**, 2007, 2010
6	Andrew Symonds	Australia	3	2	1	2005, 2006, 2008
6	Shane Watson	Australia	3	2	1	2010, 2011, 2012
6	Jacques Kallis	South Africa	3	2	1	2004, 2005, 2007
6	Lasith Malinga	Sri Lanka	3	2	1	2011, 2012, 2013
7	**Rashid Khan**	Afghanistan	2	2	0	2017, 2018
7	Glenn McGrath	Australia	2	2	0	2005, 2007
7	David Warner	Australia	2	2	0	2016, 2017
7	**Adam Zampa**	Australia	2	2	0	2022, 2023
7	**Travis Head**	Australia	2	2	0	2022, 2023
7	**Jasprit Bumrah**	India	2	2	0	2017, 2018
7	**Ravindra Jadeja**	India	2	2	0	2013, 2016
7	**Mohammed Siraj**	India	2	2	0	2022, 2023
7	Shane Bond	New Zealand	2	2	0	2006, 2007
7	Ross Taylor	New Zealand	2	2	0	2015, 2018
7	Saeed Ajmal	Pakistan	2	2	0	2012, 2013
7	Umar Gul	Pakistan	2	2	0	2009, 2011
7	Hashim Amla	South Africa	2	2	0	2013, 2015
7	Dale Steyn	South Africa	2	2	0	2011, 2014
7	Ajantha Mendis	Sri Lanka	2	2	0	2009, 2014
7	Muttiah Muralitharan	Sri Lanka	2	2	0	2006, 2007
7	Chaminda Vaas	Sri Lanka	2	2	0	2004, 2007
7	**Wanindu Hasaranga**	Sri Lanka	2	2	0	2021, 2024
7	Chris Gayle	West Indies	2	2	0	2004, 2009
7	**Shai Hope**	West Indies	2	2	0	2019, 2022
7	**Joe Root**	England	2	1	1	2015, 2018
7	Imran Tahir	South Africa	2	1	1	2015, 2016

== Selections by nation ==
Country	2004	2005	2006	2007	2008	2009	2010	2011	2012	2013	2014	2015	2016	2017	2018	2019	2021	2022	2023	2024	Total
India	2	1	3	1	2	3	2	4	3	3	4	1	3	3	4	4		2	6		51
Australia	3	4	5	4	5		5	1	2	1	2	2	3	1		1		2	2		43
South Africa	2	1		2	1		1	2	1	2	3	3	4	2			2		2		28
Sri Lanka	1	1	2	2	1	4		3	2	3	1	2					2			4	28
England	1	2	1	1		2	2	1	2	1		1	1	1	4	2					22
Pakistan		2			2	1		1	2	1	1			2		1	2	1		3	19
New Zealand		1	1	1	1	1	1			1		2		1	1	2		2	1		16
West Indies	2			1		1					1		1			1		2		1	10
Bangladesh												1			1		3	1			6
Afghanistan														1	1					3	5
Ireland																	2				2
Zimbabwe																		1			1

== See also ==
- Sir Garfield Sobers Trophy (Men's Cricketer of the Year)
- ICC Men's Test Team of the Year
- ICC Men's Test Cricketer of the Year
- ICC Men's ODI Cricketer of the Year
- David Shepherd Trophy (Umpire of the Year)
- ICC Women's Cricketer of the Year
