= Pakistani cricket team in New Zealand in 2020–21 =

International cricket tour

| | New Zealand | Pakistan |
- Dates: 18 December 2020 – 7 January 2021
| Captains | Kane Williamson (Note: Mitchell Santner captained New Zealand for the first T20I.) | Mohammad Rizwan (Tests); Shadab Khan (T20Is) |

Test series
- Result: New Zealand won the 2-match series 2–0
| Most runs | Kane Williamson (388) | Mohammad Rizwan (202) |
| Most wickets | Kyle Jamieson (16) | Shaheen Afridi (6) |
- Player of the series: Kane Williamson (NZ)

Twenty20 International series
- Results: New Zealand won the 3-match series 2–1
| Most runs | Tim Seifert (176) | Mohammad Hafeez (140) |
| Most wickets | Tim Southee (6) | Haris Rauf (5) |
- Player of the series: Tim Seifert (NZ)

The Pakistan cricket team toured New Zealand in December 2020 and January 2021 to play two Test and five Twenty20 International (T20I) matches. The Test series formed part of the inaugural 2019–2021 ICC World Test Championship. In August 2020, New Zealand Cricket confirmed that the tour was going ahead, and were working with their government to comply with biosecurity during the COVID-19 pandemic. On 29 September 2020, New Zealand Cricket confirmed the full schedule of the tour.

On 10 November 2020, Babar Azam was appointed captain of Pakistan's Test side, replacing Azhar Ali. However, he did not play in any matches on the tour, after breaking his thumb in a training session.

New Zealand won the first two T20I matches, therefore winning the series with a game to spare. Pakistan won the third and final match by four wickets, with New Zealand winning the series 2–1.

New Zealand won the first Test by 101 runs, extending their unbeaten run at home to 16 matches. New Zealand won the second Test by an innings and 176 runs, to win the series 2–0. The series win meant that they finished top of ICC Test Team Rankings for the first time.

== Squads ==
| Tests | | T20Is | |
| New Zealand | Pakistan | New Zealand | Pakistan |
|---|---|---|---|
| Kane Williamson (c); Tom Blundell; Trent Boult; Matt Henry; Kyle Jamieson; Tom Latham; Daryl Mitchell; Henry Nicholls; Mitchell Santner; Tim Southee; Ross Taylor; Neil Wagner; BJ Watling (wk); Will Young | Mohammad Rizwan (c, wk); ~~Babar Azam (c)~~; Mohammad Abbas; Shaheen Afridi; Sarfaraz Ahmed (wk); Abid Ali; Azhar Ali; Faheem Ashraf; Fawad Alam; Imran Butt; Zafar Gohar; ~~Shadab Khan~~; Sohail Khan; Shan Masood; Naseem Shah; Yasir Shah; Haris Sohail; ~~Imam-ul-Haq~~ | Kane Williamson (c); Todd Astle; Doug Bracewell; Trent Boult; Mark Chapman; Devon Conway; Jacob Duffy; Martin Guptill; Kyle Jamieson; Scott Kuggeleijn; Daryl Mitchell; James Neesham; Glenn Phillips; Mitchell Santner; Tim Seifert (wk); Ish Sodhi; Tim Southee; Blair Tickner | Shadab Khan (c); ~~Babar Azam (c)~~; Shaheen Afridi; Iftikhar Ahmed; Sarfaraz Ahmed (wk); Haider Ali; Faheem Ashraf; Mohammad Hafeez; Mohammad Hasnain; Usman Qadir; Haris Rauf; Wahab Riaz; Mohammad Rizwan (wk); Abdullah Shafique; Khushdil Shah; Hussain Talat; Imad Wasim |

Pakistan named a squad of 35 players for the tour. On 22 November 2020, Pakistan's Fakhar Zaman was ruled out of the tour due to a fever and did not travel with the team to New Zealand. On 13 December 2020, Babar Azam was ruled out of the T20I series, after he broke his thumb in a training sessions. As a result, Shadab Khan was named as the captain of Pakistan's squad for the T20I series. Babar Azam was also ruled out of Pakistan's squad for the first Test, with Mohammad Rizwan named as captain of the side. Ahead of the first Test, Shadab Khan was ruled out of the match due to an injury. Zafar Gohar was added to Pakistan's squad as Khan's replacement. On 26 December 2020, the Pakistan Cricket Board (PCB) confirmed that Shadab Khan had been ruled out of the second Test, and Pakistan's home Test series against South Africa. Imam-ul-Haq was also ruled out of Pakistan's Test squad, due to a fractured thumb. On 2 January 2021, the PCB confirmed that Babar Azam had also been ruled out of second Test match.

New Zealand named Mitchell Santner as captain for the first T20I, with Kane Williamson named as captain for the remaining matches. Santner, along with Blair Tickner, Mark Chapman, Jacob Duffy and Doug Bracewell were included for the first T20I, before being replaced by Trent Boult, Kane Williamson, Kyle Jamieson, Daryl Mitchell and Tim Southee. Lockie Ferguson and Colin de Grandhomme were both ruled out of New Zealand's Test squad due to injuries, with New Zealand Cricket naming the Test squad on 21 December 2020. Neil Wagner was ruled out of New Zealand's squad for the second Test, after suffering two broken toes during the first Test. Matt Henry was named as Wagner's replacement for the second Test.

== Practice matches ==
The Pakistan A team were scheduled to play two four-day matches against the New Zealand A team, one in Queenstown and one in Whangārei, in December 2020. Both fixtures were unofficial Test matches, with first-class status. However, the first match was cancelled following a delay for the Pakistan cricketers to practice in isolation. The Pakistan squad opted to play intra-squad matches in Queenstown instead. The Pakistan A squad also played twenty-over matches against several New Zealand domestic sides.

17–20 December 2020
Scorecard

| Pakistan A | v | New Zealand A |
| 194 (73 overs); Azhar Ali 58 (172); Edward Nuttall 5/54 (17 overs) | | 226 (82.5 overs); Rachin Ravindra 70 (158); Mohammad Abbas 4/40 (21.5 overs) |
| 329 (96.3 overs); Fawad Alam 139 (233); Matt Henry 6/53 (25.3 overs) | | 208 (64 overs); Nathan Smith 45 (108); Amad Butt 3/38 (11 overs) |

Pakistan A won by 89 runs
Cobham Oval, Whangārei
Umpires: John Dempsey (NZ) and Derek Walker (NZ)

- New Zealand A won the toss and elected to field.

27 December 2020
16:00 (D/N)
Scorecard

| Northern Knights; 203/2 (20 overs) | v | Pakistan A 182/9 (20 overs) |
| Tim Seifert 99* (55); Khushdil Shah 1/22 (3 overs) | | Zeeshan Malik 52 (33); Josh Brown 3/42 (4 overs) |

Northern Knights won by 21 runs
Seddon Park, Hamilton
Umpires: John Dempsey (NZ) and Derek Walker (NZ)

- Pakistan A won the toss and elected to field.

29 December 2020
14:40
Scorecard

| Pakistan A 91 (17.4 overs) | v | Wellington Firebirds; 97/1 (9.5 overs) |
| Danish Aziz 28 (31); Jamie Gibson 3/30 (4 overs) | | Devon Conway 48* (32); Mohammad Hasnain 1/14 (2 overs) |

Wellington Firebirds won by 9 wickets
Basin Reserve, Wellington
Umpires: Cory Black (NZ) and Tim Parlane (NZ)

- Wellington Firebirds won the toss and elected to field.

1 January 2021
14:00
Scorecard

| Canterbury Kings; 169/5 (20 overs) | v | Pakistan A 170/3 (15.1 overs) |
| Harry Chamberlain 66* (46); Haris Rauf 2/36 (4 overs) | | Rohail Nazir 69* (39); Sean Davey 1/24 (2.1 overs) |

Pakistan A won by 7 wickets
Bert Sutcliffe Oval, Lincoln
Umpires: Billy Bowden (NZ) and Derek Walker (NZ)

- Pakistan A won the toss and elected to field.

3 January 2021
11:00
Scorecard

| Pakistan A 231/5 (20 overs) | v | New Zealand XI; 130 (18.1 overs) |
| Haider Ali 64 (28); Simon Keene 2/34 (4 overs) | | Rhys Mariu 48 (35); Usman Qadir 3/18 (3 overs) |

Pakistan A won by 101 runs
Bert Sutcliffe Oval, Lincoln
Umpires: Billy Bowden (NZ) and Derek Walker (NZ)

- New Zealand XI won the toss and elected to field.

5 January 2021
11:00
Scorecard

| New Zealand XI; 181/5 (20 overs) | v | Pakistan A 161 (18.3 overs) |
| Joe Carter 81* (52); Mohammad Hasnain 2/23 (4 overs) | | Khushdil Shah 70 (42); Jakob Bhula 3/9 (2 overs) |

New Zealand XI won by 20 runs
Bert Sutcliffe Oval, Lincoln
Umpires: Billy Bowden (NZ) and Derek Walker (NZ)

- Pakistan A won the toss and elected to field.

== T20I series ==
=== 1st T20I ===
18 December 2020
19:00 (N)
Scorecard

| Pakistan; 153/9 (20 overs) | v | New Zealand; 156/5 (18.5 overs) |
| Shadab Khan 42 (32); Jacob Duffy 4/33 (4 overs) | | Tim Seifert 57 (43); Haris Rauf 3/29 (4 overs) |

New Zealand won by 5 wickets
Eden Park, Auckland
Umpires: Shaun Haig (NZ) and Wayne Knights (NZ)
Player of the match: Jacob Duffy (NZ)

- Pakistan won the toss and elected to bat.
- Jacob Duffy (NZ) made his T20I debut.
- Shadab Khan captained Pakistan for the first time in T20Is.

=== 2nd T20I ===
20 December 2020
19:00 (N)
Scorecard

| Pakistan; 163/6 (20 overs) | v | New Zealand; 164/1 (19.2 overs) |
| Mohammad Hafeez 99* (57); Tim Southee 4/21 (4 overs) | | Tim Seifert 84* (63); Faheem Ashraf 1/19 (3.2 overs) |

New Zealand won by 9 wickets
Seddon Park, Hamilton
Umpires: Chris Brown (NZ) and Shaun Haig (NZ)
Player of the match: Tim Southee (NZ)

- Pakistan won the toss and elected to bat.

=== 3rd T20I ===
22 December 2020
19:00 (N)
Scorecard

| New Zealand; 173/7 (20 overs) | v | Pakistan; 177/6 (19.4 overs) |
| Devon Conway 63 (45); Faheem Ashraf 3/20 (4 overs) | | Mohammad Rizwan 89 (59); Tim Southee 2/25 (4 overs) |

Pakistan won by 4 wickets
McLean Park, Napier
Umpires: Chris Brown (NZ) and Wayne Knights (NZ)
Player of the match: Mohammad Rizwan (Pak)

- Pakistan won the toss and elected to field.

== Test series ==
=== 1st Test ===
26–30 December 2020
Scorecard

| New Zealand | v | Pakistan |
| 431 (155 overs); Kane Williamson 129 (297); Shaheen Afridi 4/109 (36 overs) | | 239 (102.2 overs); Faheem Ashraf 91 (134); Kyle Jamieson 3/35 (23.2 overs) |
| 180/5d (45.3 overs); Tom Blundell 64 (107); Naseem Shah 3/55 (12.3 overs) | | 271 (123.3 overs); Fawad Alam 102 (269); Tim Southee 2/33 (23 overs) |

New Zealand won by 101 runs
Bay Oval, Mount Maunganui
Umpires: Chris Gaffaney (NZ) and Wayne Knights (NZ)
Player of the match: Kane Williamson (NZ)

- Pakistan won the toss and elected to field.
- Mohammad Rizwan captained Pakistan for the first time in Tests.
- Ross Taylor became the most-capped player for New Zealand in international cricket, playing in his 438th match across all three formats.
- Tim Southee (NZ) took his 300th wicket in Tests.
- World Test Championship points: New Zealand 60, Pakistan 0.

=== 2nd Test ===
3–7 January 2021 (Note: While five days of play were scheduled for each Test, the second Test reached a result in four days.)
Scorecard

| Pakistan | v | New Zealand |
| 297 (83.5 overs); Azhar Ali 93 (172); Kyle Jamieson 5/69 (21 overs) | | 659/6d (158.5 overs); Kane Williamson 238 (364); Mohammad Abbas 2/98 (34 overs) |
| 186 (81.4 overs); Zafar Gohar 37 (64); Kyle Jamieson 6/48 (20 overs) |

New Zealand won by an innings and 176 runs
Hagley Oval, Christchurch
Umpires: Chris Brown (NZ) and Chris Gaffaney (NZ)
Player of the match: Kyle Jamieson (NZ)

- New Zealand won the toss and elected to field.
- Zafar Gohar (Pak) made his Test debut.
- Henry Nicholls (NZ) scored his 2,000th run in Tests.
- Kane Williamson became the fastest batsman for New Zealand, in terms of innings, to score 7,000 runs in Tests (144).
- Kane Williamson and Henry Nicholls recorded highest fourth wicket partnership for New Zealand in Tests (369).
- Daryl Mitchell (NZ) scored his first century in Tests.
- World Test Championship points: New Zealand 60, Pakistan 0.
