= ICC Men's T20I Cricketer of the Year =

International cricket annual award

ICC Award for Best T20I men's cricketer of the year
- Awarded for: Best performance over year in T20I cricket
- Presented by: ICC
- Formerly called: ICC Twenty20 International Performance of the Year
- First award: 2021
- Currently held by: (India) Arshdeep Singh (1st award)

Highlights
- Most awards: (India) Suryakumar Yadav (2 awards)
- Website: ICC Awards

The ICC Men's T20I Cricketer of the Year is an annual award, established in 2021 by the International Cricket Council to the best Twenty20 International player over the year in question. It is one of the annual ICC Awards. It has succeeded former Twenty20 International Performance of the Year Award, which was awarded to a player based on a single match performance.

== Selection ==
The nominees were shortlisted by the Awards panel, comprising prominent cricket journalists and broadcasters from across the globe along with Geoff Allardice, the ICC's CEO.The Voting Academy, comprising a wider selection of global cricket journalists and broadcasters, voted for their first, second and third choices. The ICC also took into consideration fans’ votes via ICC's digital channels. The result of the Voting Academy selections and the fans’ vote were combined to determine the winner.

== List of Winners ==
Year	Winner	Also Nominated
2021	(Pakistan) Mohammad Rizwan	(England) Jos Buttler; (Sri Lanka) Wanindu Hasaranga; (Australia) Mitchell Marsh
2022	(India) Suryakumar Yadav	(Zimbabwe) Sikandar Raza; (England) Sam Curran; (Pakistan) Mohammad Rizwan
2023	(India) Suryakumar Yadav	(Zimbabwe) Sikandar Raza; (Uganda) Alpesh Ramjani; (New Zealand) Mark Chapman
2024	(India) Arshdeep Singh	(Pakistan) Babar Azam; (Australia) Travis Head; (Zimbabwe) Sikandar Raza

== See also ==
- ICC Awards
