= List of Indian Premier League captains =

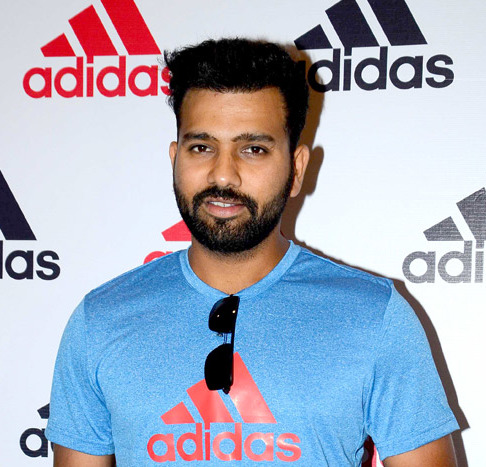
Rohit Sharma holds the record of the most IPL titles as a player (6) as well as holds the record of 5 IPL titles, jointly Most by any captain in IPL.

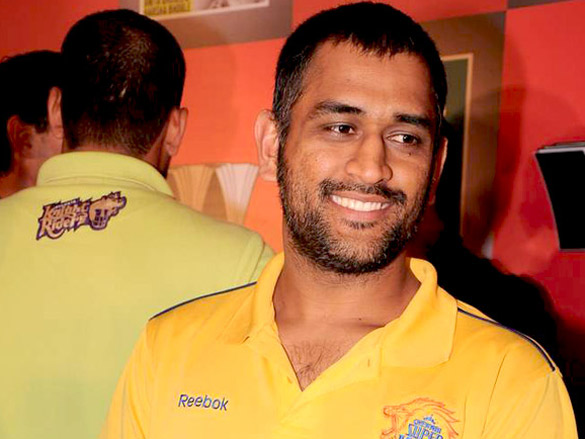
MS Dhoni holds the record of most matches, Most wins, highest win percentage, Most playoffs, Most finals as a captain in the IPL.

In cricket, a captain is a player who leads the team and has additional roles and responsibilities. The Indian Premier League (IPL) is a professional league for Twenty20 cricket in India, which has been held annually since its first edition in 2008.

In the 19 seasons played till 2026, 75 players have captained their team in at least one match. Mumbai Indians' Rohit Sharma and Chennai Super Kings's MS Dhoni are the most successful captains with five IPL titles each. Dhoni also holds the records for most matches (229) and most wins (134) as a captain. Shreyas Iyer, Mahela Jayawardene, Ajinkya Rahane, Kumar Sangakkara, and Steven Smith are the only players to have captained three different teams, with Shreyas Iyer being the only captain to have led three different sides to the finals of the IPL. Kolkata Knight Riders is the only team to have won IPL with different captains.

== Key ==
Symbol	Meaning
First	Year of the first IPL match as a captain
Last	Year of latest IPL match as a captain
Matches	Number of matches as a captain
Team(s)	Team(s) for which the player has played as captain in at least one match
Won	Number of games won
Lost	Number of games lost
Tied	Number of games tied
NR	Number of games with no result
Win%	The percentage of games won by that captain (Note: Games that did not have a result are not taken into consideration while calculating the result percentage. Ties are counted as half a win.)
^{[†]}	Players who captained their sides in the 2026 season

== Captains ==
The list includes those players who have captained an IPL team in at least one IPL match. The list is organised by the number of matches as a captain and if the numbers are tied, the list is sorted by the date of first match as captain (Note: These statistics do not cover the games played in other tournaments such as the Champions League Twenty20, the British Asian Cup or the 2008 Kolkata Knight Riders tour of Australia).

Indian Premier League captains
Player	Nationality (Note: Represents the primary nationality as per Cricinfo. This information may not necessarily reflect the player's birthplace or citizenship.)	First	Last	Matches	Team(s)	Won	Lost	Tied	NR	Win%	Titles
MS Dhoni	India	2008	2025	235	CSK; RPS	136	97	0	2	57.87	5
Rohit Sharma	India	2013	2023	158	MI	87	67	4	0	55.06	5
Virat Kohli	India	2011	2023	143	RCB	66	70	3	4	46.15	
Gautam Gambhir	India	2009	2018	129	DC; KKR	71	57	1	0	55.03	2
Shreyas Iyer^{[†]}	India	2018	2026	101	DC; KKR; PBKS	55	41	2	3	54.45	1
David Warner	Australia	2013	2023	83	DC; SRH	40	41	2	0	48.19	1
Adam Gilchrist	Australia	2008	2013	74	DCH; KXIP	35	39	0	0	47.29	1
Rishabh Pant^{[†]}	India	2021	2026	71	DC; LSG	33	36	2	0	46.47	
Hardik Pandya^{[†]}	India	2022	2026	70	GT; MI	37	33	0	0	52.85	1
Sanju Samson	India	2021	2025	67	RR	33	32	1	1	49.25	
K. L. Rahul	India	2020	2023	64	PBKS; LSG	31	31	2	0	48.43	
Shane Warne	Australia	2008	2011	55	RR	30	24	1	0	54.55	1
Virender Sehwag	India	2008	2015	53	DC; KXIP	28	24	1	0	52.83	
Ajinkya Rahane^{[†]}	India	2017	2026	52	KKR; RR; RPS	19	30	1	2	36.53	
Sachin Tendulkar	India	2008	2011	51	MI	30	21	0	0	58.82	
Rahul Dravid	India	2008	2013	48	RR; RCB	22	26	0	0	45.83	
Kumar Sangakkara	Sri Lanka	2010	2013	47	KXIP; DCH; SRH	15	30	2	0	31.91	
Kane Williamson	New Zealand	2018	2022	46	SRH	22	23	1	0	47.83	
Faf du Plessis	South Africa	2022	2025	44	DC; RCB	22	22	0	0	50.00	
Dinesh Karthik	India	2010	2020	43	DC; KKR	21	21	1	0	48.83	
Shubman Gill^{[†]}	India	2024	2026	43	GT	24	19	0	0	55.81	
Steven Smith	Australia	2012	2020	43	PWI; RPS; RR	25	17	0	1	58.13	
Yuvraj Singh	India	2008	2011	43	KXIP; PWI	21	21	0	1	48.83	
Saurav Ganguly	India	2008	2012	42	KKR; PWI	17	25	0	0	40.47	
Pat Cummins^{[†]}	Australia	2024	2026	38	SRH	20	17	0	1	52.63	
Suresh Raina	India	2010	2019	34	CSK; GL	14	18	2	0	41.17	
Ruturaj Gaikwad^{[†]}	India	2024	2026	33	CSK	14	19	0	0	42.42	
George Bailey	Australia	2014	2015	30	KXIP	14	16	0	0	46.67	
Mahela Jayawardene	Sri Lanka	2010	2013	30	KXIP; KTK; DC	10	19	1	0	33.33	
Rajat Patidar^{[†]}	India	2025	2026	28	RCB	20	8	0	0	71.42	2
Ravichandran Ashwin	India	2018	2019	28	KXIP	12	16	0	0	42.85	
Axar Patel^{[†]}	India	2024	2026	27	DC	12	13	1	1	44.44	
Shikhar Dhawan	India	2014	2024	27	SRH; PBKS	10	17	0	0	37.03	
Anil Kumble	India	2009	2010	26	RCB	15	11	0	0	57.69	
Eoin Morgan	England	2020	2021	24	KKR	11	12	1	0	45.83	
Shane Watson	Australia	2008	2017	24	RR; RCB	8	13	2	1	33.33	
Zaheer Khan	India	2016	2017	23	DC	10	13	0	0	43.47	
Daniel Vettori	New Zealand	2011	2012	22	RCB	12	10	0	0	54.54	
Riyan Parag^{[†]}	India	2025	2026	22	RR	10	12	0	0	45.45	
Harbhajan Singh	India	2008	2012	20	MI	10	10	0	0	50.00	
Kevin Pietersen	England	2009	2014	17	DC; RCB	3	14	0	0	17.64	
JP Duminy	South Africa	2015	2016	16	DC	6	9	0	1	37.5	
Mayank Agarwal	India	2021	2022	14	PBKS	7	7	0	0	50.00	
Glenn Maxwell	Australia	2017	2017	14	KXIP	7	7	0	0	50.00	
Nitish Rana	India	2023	2023	14	KKR	6	8	0	0	42.85	
Brendon McCullum	New Zealand	2009	2016	14	KKR; GL	3	10	1	0	21.42	
Aiden Markram	South Africa	2023	2023	13	SRH	4	9	0	0	30.76	
Cameron White	Australia	2011	2013	12	DCH; SRH	7	5	0	0	58.33	
David Hussey	Australia	2012	2013	12	KXIP	6	6	0	0	50.00	
Sam Curran	England	2023	2024	11	PBKS	5	6	0	0	45.45	
Aaron Finch	Australia	2013	2013	10	PWI	2	8	0	0	20.00	
Murali Vijay	India	2016	2016	8	KXIP	3	5	0	0	37.50	
Bhuvneshwar Kumar	India	2019	2023	8	SRH	2	6	0	0	25.00	
Ravindra Jadeja	India	2022	2022	8	CSK	2	6	0	0	25.00	
Ishan Kishan^{[†]}	India	2026	2026	7	SRH	4	3	0	0	57.14	
Kieron Pollard	West Indies	2019	2021	6	MI	4	2	0	0	66.66	
Krunal Pandya	India	2023	2023	6	LSG	3	2	0	1	50.00	
David Miller	South Africa	2016	2016	6	KXIP	1	5	0	0	16.66	
V. V. S. Laxman	India	2008	2008	6	DCH	1	5	0	0	16.66	
Ricky Ponting	Australia	2013	2013	6	MI	3	3	0	0	50.00	
Suryakumar Yadav^{[†]}	India	2023	2026	5	MI	2	3	0	0	40.00	
Angelo Mathews	Sri Lanka	2013	2013	5	PWI	1	4	0	0	20.00	
Shaun Pollock	South Africa	2008	2008	4	MI	3	1	0	0	75.00	
Jitesh Sharma^{[†]}	India	2024	2026	4	PBKS; RCB	2	2	0	0	50.00	
Darren Sammy	West Indies	2014	2014	4	SRH	2	2	0	0	50.00	
Karun Nair	India	2017	2017	3	DC	2	1	0	0	66.66	
Rashid Khan^{[†]}	Afghanistan	2022	2026	3	GT	1	2	0	0	33.33	
James Hopes	Australia	2011	2011	3	DC	0	2	0	1	0.00	
Yashasvi Jaiswal^{[†]}	India	2026	2026	2	RR	1	1	0	0	50.00	
Jasprit Bumrah^{[†]}	India	2026	2026	1	MI	1	0	0	0	100.00	
Nicholas Pooran	West Indies	2024	2024	1	LSG	1	0	0	0	100.00	
Ross Taylor	New Zealand	2013	2013	1	PWI	1	0	0	0	100.00	
Dwayne Bravo	West Indies	2010	2010	1	MI	0	1	0	0	0.00	
Manish Pandey	India	2021	2021	1	SRH	0	1	0	0	0.00	
Parthiv Patel	India	2011	2011	1	KTK	0	1	0	0	0.00	

== Notes ==
^{†} denotes players who captained their sides in the 2026 season.
