= Suryakumar Yadav =

Indian cricketer (born 1990)

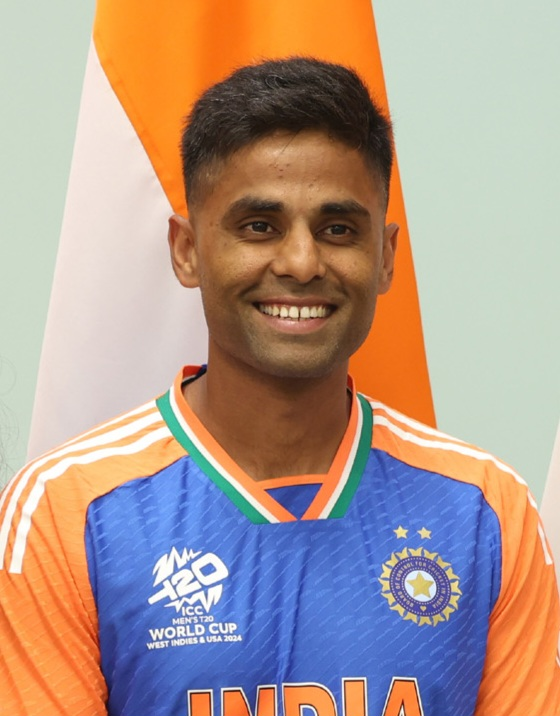
- Yadav in 2024

Personal information
- Full name: Suryakumar Ashok Yadav
- Born: 14 September 1990 (age 36); Bombay, Maharashtra, India
- Nickname: Mr. 360
- Batting: Right-handed
- Bowling: Right-arm off break
- Role: Batter

International information
- National side: India (2021–2026)
- Only Test (cap 304): 9 February 2023 v Australia
- ODI debut (cap 236): 18 July 2021 v Sri Lanka
- Last ODI: 19 November 2023 v Australia
- ODI shirt no.: 63
- T20I debut (cap 85): 14 March 2021 v England
- Last T20I: 8 March 2026 v New Zealand
- T20I shirt no.: 63

Domestic team information
- Years: Team
- 2009–present: Parsi Gymkhana
- 2010–present: Mumbai
- 2012–2013, 2018–present: Mumbai Indians
- 2014–2017: Kolkata Knight Riders

Career statistics
Competition	Test	ODI	T20I	FC
Matches	1	37	113	86
Runs scored	8	773	3,272	5,758
Batting average	8.00	25.76	36.35	42.33
100s/50s	0/0	0/4	4/25	14/30
Top score	8	72*	117	200
Balls bowled	–	12	6	1,154
Wickets	–	0	2	24
Bowling average	–	–	2.50	22.91
5 wickets in innings	–	–	0	0
10 wickets in match	–	–	0	0
Best bowling	–	–	2/5	4/47
Catches/stumpings	0/–	17/–	58/–	109/–
Medal record
Men's cricket
Representing India
ICC Cricket World Cup
Runner-up	2023 India
ICC T20 World Cup
Winner	2024 West Indies and USA
Winner	2026 India and Sri Lanka
ACC Asia Cup
Winner	2023 Pakistan
Winner	2025 United Arab Emirates
ACC Asia Cup Rising Stars
Winner	2013 Singapore
- Source: ESPNcricinfo, 8 March 2026

Suryakumar Ashok Yadav (born 14 September 1990), also known by his initials SKY, is an Indian cricketer and former captain of the Twenty20 International team, a role he held as India won the 2026 Men's T20 World Cup and the 2025 Asia Cup. He was part of the national team that won the 2024 Men's T20 World Cup and the 2023 Asia Cup.

Yadav started playing club cricket in Mumbai before he was selected for the Mumbai cricket team. He made his List A debut for Mumbai in February 2010 before making his first-class and T20 debut in the same year. In March 2021, he made his T20I debut and later made his ODI debut in July of the same year. He has mainly played limited-overs cricket for India, having played his only Test match in February 2023. He was named as the captain of the Indian team for first time in November 2023 and was re-appointed as the captain of the Indian T20I team in July 2024 after the previous captain Rohit Sharma announced his retirement from T20Is. Under his leadership, India did not lose a single T20I series or tournament, winning the Asia Cup 2025 and the T20 World Cup 2026.

As of August 2024, Yadav has scored more than 3,000 runs in international cricket with four centuries. More than 75% of his career runs and all of his centuries have come from T20I matches. His four T20I centuries are the second most by any batter. He held the top ranking in the ICC men's player rankings for T20Is from October 2022 to June 2024. He won the ICC Men's T20I Cricketer of the Year award in 2022 and 2023, and was also named in the ICC Men's T20I Team of the Year in 2022 and 2023.

Yadav plays for Mumbai in the Indian domestic cricket, which he has captained in the past. He plays for Mumbai Indians and has previously played for Kolkata Knight Riders in the Indian Premier League, and has won one title with Kolkata in 2014 and two with Mumbai, in 2019 and 2020.

== Early and personal life ==
Suryakumar Ashok Yadav was born on 14 September 1990 in Bombay, Maharashtra. His parents are from Ghazipur, Uttar Pradesh. He did his schooling at Atomic Energy Central School in Mumbai and graduated with a B.Com from Pillai College in Mumbai. He started playing cricket under the guidance of his paternal uncle Vinod Kumar Yadav in Varanasi, Uttar Pradesh. At the age of 10, he was enrolled in a cricket camp at BARC colony in Mumbai. He then went to Elf Vengsarkar Academy, run by former international cricketer Dilip Vengsarkar, and played age-group cricket in Mumbai.

On 7 July 2016, Yadav married Devisha Shetty, a trained dancer and a dance coach, whom he first met at a college program in 2010. The couple had their first child, a girl, on 7 May 2026.

== Early and domestic career ==
Yadav played club cricket in Mumbai, mostly for Parsi Gymkhana Cricket Club, along with teams including Bharat Petroleum Corporation Limited, Parsi Gymkhana and Dadar Union. He made his debut for Mumbai against Gujarat in a List A match in February 2010. He made his T20 debut against Hyderabad next month and first-class debut later against Delhi in December 2010. In the 2011–12 Ranji Trophy season, he scored the most runs for Mumbai with 754 runs from nine games at an average of over 68. He was also part of the Indian under-22 team and scored 721 runs at an average of more than 80 with two centuries. He was awarded the MA Chidambaram Trophy for the Best Under-22 cricketer by the Board of Control for Cricket in India at a ceremony held in Chennai on 10 December 2011.

Yadav captained the Mumbai team for a brief period during the 2014–15 Ranji Trophy season, before he was replaced midway into the tournament. He scored 690 runs across ten matches in the tournament. He was part of the Mumbai squad that won the 2015–16 Ranji Trophy. He was among the top five run-getters in the season with 788 runs and scored three centuries including a score of 115 in the second innings of the semifinal match against Madhya Pradesh. The Mumbai team consisting of Yadav reached the second consecutive Ranji final in 2016–17 but lost to Gujarat. He scored more than 600 runs for the third consecutive season with a highest score of 110 runs.

Yadav scored 241 runs with an average of over 40 in the 2018–19 Vijay Hazare Trophy List A cricket tournament, which was won by Mumbai. In October 2019, he was named in the India C squad for the 2019–20 Deodhar Trophy. He was again appointed as captain of the Mumbai team for the 2019-20 season, but Mumbai failed to make it out of the group stage in the tournament. He also captained the team in the 2020–21 Syed Mushtaq Ali Trophy T20 tournament. His team fared poorly finishing bottom of the Group E with just one win in five matches. Along with his commitments with the Mumbai team, he continued to play club cricket for Parsi Gymkhana. He scored 249 runs in the final against Payyade Sports Club in the Police Shield tournament in 2021, winning the "Best Batsman of the Final" award, and helped the club to win the tournament for the first time since 1956.

== International career ==
=== Debut and early career ===
In February 2021, Yadav was named in the Indian Twenty20 International (T20I) squad for the home series against England. He made his T20I debut on 14 March 2021 in the second match of the series at Ahmedabad but did not get a chance to bat. In the fourth game of the series held on 18 March, he played his first innings as a batter and hit the first ball he faced in international cricket for a six, becoming the first Indian to do so in T20Is. He went on to score a half-century in the match, and his performance in the game was praised by then–Indian captain Virat Kohli. He was named in Indian One Day International (ODI) squad for the subsequent series against England but did not play any matches. In June 2021, he was part of the Indian limited-overs squads for the away series against Sri Lanka. He made his ODI debut on 18 July 2021 in the first match of the series at Colombo. On 20 July 2021, he scored his maiden ODI half-century against Sri Lanka.

In July 2021, Yadav was called up as a replacement player to the Indian Test squad for the away series against England, but did not play a match. In September 2021, he was selected in the Indian squad for the 2021 ICC Men's T20 World Cup. He scored just 31 runs across three matches in the World Cup, in which India was eliminated from the group stage. In November 2021, he was named in the Indian Test squad for their home series against New Zealand but was not selected in the playing XI for any of the games. He played three T20Is against New Zealand, scoring 63 runs across three innings including a half-century and a duck. He was part of both the limited overs squads for the home series against West Indies in February 2022 and made a comeback to the ODI team in the series.

=== Top-ranked T20I batter ===
In June 2022, Yadav was part of the Indian squad for the T20I series against Ireland and the subsequent tour of England. In July 2022, he scored his first T20I century against England at Trent Bridge, scoring 117 off 55 balls. He became only the fifth Indian player to score a century in T20Is and only the second to reach the mark batting fourth or lower. In August 2022, he played in the 2022 Asia Cup T20I competition and scored 139 runs across five innings. Later, he was part of the T20I home series against Australia and South Africa. In October 2022, he became the fastest to score 1,000 runs in T20Is in terms of balls faced, reaching the mark in 573 balls in the series against South Africa. On 30 October 2022, he achieved the top rank in the ICC men's player rankings for T20I batsmen for the first time in his career.

In October 2022, Yadav played in the 2022 ICC Men's T20 World Cup in Australia in which India reached the semi-finals. He was the third highest run-getter in the tournament with 239 runs across six innings. On 27 October 2022, he scored his first half-century at the T20 World Cup, reaching the mark in 25 balls against Netherlands at Sydney. In November 2022, he scored his second T20I century against New Zealand at Mount Maunganui scoring 111* off 51 balls, which included eleven fours and seven sixes. He became only the second Indian to score two centuries in T20Is in a calendar year after Rohit Sharma. He won the ICC Men's T20I Cricketer of the Year award in 2022 and was also named in the ICC Men's T20I Team of the Year.

In January 2023, Yadav scored the second fastest century by an Indian batter in T20Is and the third of his career, reaching the mark in 45 balls against Sri Lanka at Rajkot. He played in both the ODI and T20I series against the touring New Zealand team in January–February 2023 and scored 142 runs across five innings. In January 2023, he achieved 910 rating points, the second-best in the history of men's T20I rankings and was named as the captain of the ICC Men's T20I Team of the Year for 2022.

=== Test debut and World Cups ===
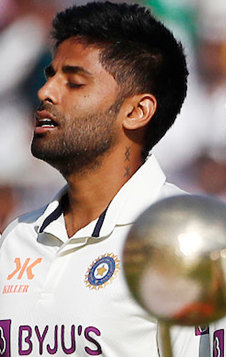
Yadav during the Border–Gavaskar Trophy in 2023

On 9 February 2023, Yadav made his Test debut against Australia at Nagpur, which has been his only Test appearance as of August 2024. In the subsequent ODI series, he registered his third consecutive golden duck in the third match of the series at Chennai, becoming the first Indian batter to do so. In August 2023, he was appointed as the vice-captain of the Indian team for the T20I series against West Indies. He scored 166 runs across four innings including 83 runs off 44 balls in the third match of the series. He was part of the Indian squad that won the 2023 Asia Cup but played only one game in the series in the loss to Bangladesh. Later, he was named in the Indian squad for the 2023 Cricket World Cup held in India. He scored just 106 runs across seven innings in the World Cup, in which India finished as the runners-up. After the World Cup, he was named as the captain of the Indian team for the home T20I series against Australia. He scored 144 runs in five innings and led the team to a 4–1 series victory. He was also named as captain for the subsequent Indian tour of South Africa. In the series, he scored the fourth T20I century of his career, equalling Rohit Sharma and Glenn Maxwell for the record of most centuries in T20Is (which has since been surpassed by both Sharma and Maxwell). He won the ICC Men's T20I Cricketer of the Year award for the second consecutive year in 2023.

In May 2024, Yadav was named in the Indian squad for the 2024 ICC Men's T20 World Cup tournament. In the Super 8 match against Afghanistan, he was named Player of the Match in the tournament for his score of 53 runs from 28 balls. In the final against South Africa, he took a catch close to the boundary line in the final over of the South African innings to dismiss David Miller. India went on to win the match by seven runs to lift their second T20 World Cup; they had last won the inaugural edition in 2007. Cricket commentator Ian Smith referred to the catch as being "one of the greatest" in the history of the game. In June 2024, he dropped to second in the ICC T20I player rankings, after being overtaken by Australian Travis Head. He captained the Indian team that toured Sri Lanka for a three-match T20 series played at Pallekele in late July, which India won 3–0.

=== Later years ===
In September 2025, Yadav captained the Indian team that won the 2025 Asia Cup. During the tournament, he was fined 30% of his match fee for breaching the ICC Cricket Code of Conduct after he made comments dedicating the victory to the victims of the Pahalgam attack. Yadav later declared that he will donate his entire match fees of ₹2.8 million (US$30,000) from the tournament to the Indian Army and the families of Pahalgam attack victims. Since early 2025, Yadav hit a lean patch, wherein he score just 244 runs at an average of 12.84 across 25 matches. In the home series against New Zealand in January 2026, he returned to scoring form, with 242 runs across five innings at an average of 80.66 and was awarded the player of the series.

Yadav led the Indian team in the 2026 Men's T20 World Cup hosted by India and Sri Lanka in February–March 2026. In India's first match of the tournament, against United States national cricket team, he completed 1,000 T20I runs as a captain, after he scored 84 runs of 49 balls in an Indian victory, which also won him the player of the match award. India won the tournament by beating New Zealand in the final, and Yadav became the third Indian captain to lift the T20 World Cup.

Due to his poor form throughout the span of his international captaincy stint and a terrible IPL season in 2026, Yadav was sacked from captaincy and dropped from the T20I squad for series against Ireland and England and the squad for Asian Games 2026 and was replaced by new captain Shreyas Iyer who made to the T20I squad after 2023.

== IPL career ==
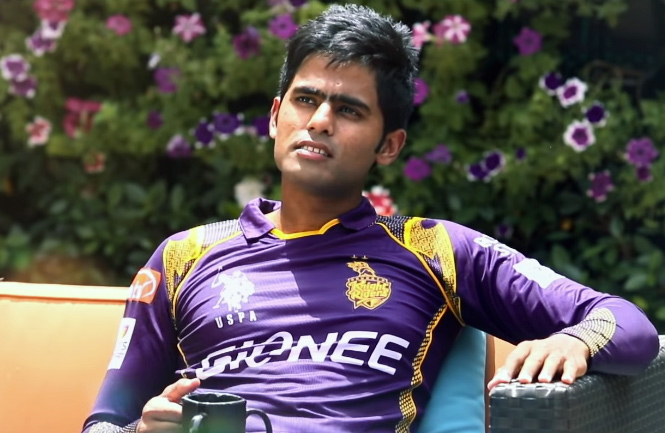
Yadav with the Kolkata Knight Riders in 2015

Yadav was signed by the Mumbai Indians (MI) in the Indian Premier League (IPL) ahead of the 2012 season. He played just one match and was dismissed without scoring. In the 2014 IPL auction, he was bought by the Kolkata Knight Riders (KKR) for ₹7 million (US$75,000). He scored 164 runs at an average of over 32 with KKR winning the title in his first season with the team. He spent four seasons with the team, scoring 608 runs in 54 matches.

In 2018 IPL auction, Yadav was bought back by the Mumbai Indians for a price of ₹32 million (US$340,000). He was a prolific run-scorer for Mumbai, scoring more than 1400 runs across three seasons, and won the title with the team in the 2019 and 2020 seasons. He was retained by the franchise ahead of the 2022 auction for ₹80 million (US$850,000). He missed the start of the 2022 season due to injury and, on his return, scored 303 runs in eight matches at an average of more than 43. His 2022 season ended after suffering a muscle injury in the 6 May match against Gujarat Titans.

Yadav was appointed as the vice-captain of the team for the 2023 season and captained the team in a match against his old team KKR after Rohit missed it due to injury. In the 2023 season, he had his best ever IPL season with the bat, scoring 605 runs in 16 matches including his maiden IPL century against Gujarat Titans on 12 May. He missed the first few matches of the 2024 IPL season as he was recovering from injury. He played 11 games in the season and scored 345 runs including his second IPL century against the Sunrisers Hyderabad.

== Playing style ==
Yadav is a hard-hitting middle-order batter. He has a tendency to go all-out from the first ball, rather than take time to settle at the crease. He plays a wide range of shots and all around the ground on both off and leg sides. He uses his wrists to play shots around the ground and is often called Mr. 360 for his range of shots including scoops over fine leg.

== Honors ==
=== India ===
- T20 Cricket World Cup: 2024, 2026
- Asia Cup: 2023, 2025

=== Kolkata Knight Riders ===
- Indian Premier League: 2014

=== Mumbai Indians ===
- Indian Premier League: 2013, 2019, 2020

=== Individual ===
- ICC Men's T20I Cricketer of the Year: 2022, 2023
- MA Chidambaram Trophy for the Best Under-22 cricketer by the BCCI: 2011
- ICC Men's T20I Team of the Year: 2022, 2023

== Career statistics ==
International centuries
No.	Score	Against	Pos.	Inn.	Venue	H/A	Date	Result	Ref
1	117	England	4	2	Trent Bridge, Nottingham	Away	10 July 2022	Lost	
2	111*	New Zealand	3	1	Bay Oval, Mount Maunganui	Away	20 November 2022	Won	
3	112*	Sri Lanka	4	1	Saurashtra Cricket Association Stadium, Rajkot	Home	7 January 2023	Won	
4	100	South Africa	4	1	Wanderers Stadium, Johannesburg	Away	14 December 2023	Won	

Awards
Preceded by Mohammad Rizwan	ICC Men's T20I Cricketer of the Year; 2022–present	Succeeded by Incumbent
