= Mohammad Rizwan =

Pakistani cricketer (born 1992)

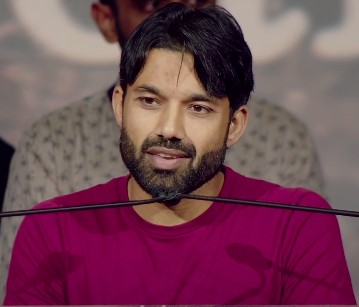
- Rizwan in 2023

Personal information
- Born: 1 June 1992 (age 34); Peshawar, Pakistan
- Nickname: Rizi, Rizu, Sattay Baaz (Gambler),
- Height: 5 ft 7 in (1.70 m)
- Batting: Right-handed
- Bowling: Right-arm medium
- Role: Wicket-keeper-Batter

International information
- National side: Pakistan (2015–2026)
- Test debut (cap 224): 25 November 2016 v New Zealand
- Last Test: 27 August 2026 v England
- ODI debut (cap 200): 17 April 2015 v Bangladesh
- Last ODI: 15 March 2026 v Bangladesh
- ODI shirt no.: 16
- T20I debut (cap 60): 24 April 2015 v Bangladesh
- Last T20I: 13 December 2024 v South Africa
- T20I shirt no.: 16

Domestic team information
- Years: Team
- 2008–2015: Peshawar Panthers
- 2011–2018: Sui Northern Gas Pipelines Limited
- 2016–2017: Lahore Qalandars
- 2017: Sylhet Sixers
- 2018–2020: Karachi Kings
- 2018: Punjab
- 2019–2023: Khyber Pakhtunkhwa
- 2021–2025: Multan Sultans
- 2022: Sussex
- 2023: Comilla Victorians
- 2025/26: Melbourne Renegades
- 2026: Rawalpindiz

Career statistics
Competition	Test	ODI	FC	LA
Matches	47	103	135	207
Runs scored	2,682	2,979	7,634	6,761
Batting average	37.77	40.80	41.94	46.95
100s/50s	3/14	4/19	15/37	13/38
Top score	171*	131*	224	141*
Balls bowled	–	–	237	–
Wickets	–	–	4	–
Bowling average	–	–	34.00	–
5 wickets in innings	–	–	0	–
10 wickets in match	–	–	0	–
Best bowling	–	–	2/10	–
Catches/stumpings	127/10	113/7	377/25	213/23
Medal record
Men's cricket
Representing Pakistan
ICC T20 World Cup
Runner-up	2022 Australia
ACC Asia Cup
Runner-up	2022 UAE
ACC Emerging Asia Cup
Runner-up	2013 Singapore
- Source: ESPNcricinfo, 31 August 2026

Mohammad Rizwan (Urdu: محمد رضوان, pronounced [mʊɦəmməd rɪzwɑːn]; born 1 June 1992) is a Pakistani international cricketer. He is a right-handed batter and wicket-keeper. He captains Pakistan Super League franchise Rawalpindiz and the Khyber Pakhtunkhwa team in domestic cricket. He has previously been the captain of the Pakistan team in ODIs and vice-captain in Test cricket and T20Is. He played for Lahore Qalandars in the PSL from 2016 to 2017, for Karachi Kings from 2018 to 2020, and captained Multan Sultans from 2021 till 2025. He also led the Multan Sultans to victory in the 2021 Pakistan Super League.

In 2021, he was named the ICC Men's T20I Cricketer of the Year and was also among the Wisden Cricketers of the Year.

He has scored centuries in all three formats: Tests, ODI and T20I. He holds the record for most runs in T20 Internationals in a calendar year with 1326 runs in 26 innings at an average of 73.66. Rizwan is the only player to score 2000 runs in a calendar year in T20s.

== Early career ==
Rizwan was born on 1 June 1992 in Peshawar to Akhter Parvez into a Pashtun family of six siblings, with Rizwan being the second of three brothers. He began his cricket career with tape ball before joining clubs such as the Islamia College and later the Shama Club, eventually playing for Peshawar Under-19 in 2007.

== Domestic career ==
=== Pakistan ===
Making his first-class debut with Peshawar during the 2008–09 season, Rizwan hit five 50s, including four unbeaten, in his first seven innings. His good form, both with the bat and behind the wickets, attracted the attention of Basit Ali, the coach of Sui Northern Gas Pipelines Limited, who recruited him to his team for the 2011–12 season.

Playing for Sui Northern Gas Pipelines Limited in the final of the Quaid-e-Azam Trophy in 2014–15, Rizwan scored 224 to help Sui Northern to a 301-run first-innings lead and their second title. He kept wicket for Pakistan A in the five limited-overs matches against Kenya in December 2014.

In April 2018, he was named the vice-captain of Punjab's squad for the 2018 Pakistan Cup. On 1 May 2018, he scored his highest total in List A cricket, with 140 off 123 balls against Federal Areas. In March 2019, he was named as the captain of Federal Areas squad for the 2019 Pakistan Cup.

In September 2019, Rizwan was named as the captain of Khyber Pakhtunkhwa for the 2019–20 Quaid-e-Azam Trophy tournament. In October 2019, he was named the player of the tournament in the 2019–20 National T20 Cup, for scoring 215 runs and taking six wickets.

He was retained by Khyber Pakhtunkhwa for the 2020–21 domestic season, both as player and captain of the team.

=== England ===
In December 2021, he was signed by Sussex to play County Championship and T20 cricket in 2022.

== Franchise career ==
=== Pakistan Super League ===
Mohammad Rizwan's record in PSL matches
Matches	Runs	HS	100s	50s	Avg.	SR.
93	2774	110*	2	22	43.39	134.60

Rizwan started his PSL career with Lahore Qalandars in the inaugural 2016 season. His two-year stint with the team proved underwhelming as Qalandars failed to qualify for the playoffs in both seasons, while Rizwan managed only 233 runs in 16 matches.

He represented Karachi Kings from the 2018 to the 2020 season. Despite becoming Pakistan's first-choice wicket-keeper batter in international cricket, Rizwan struggled to secure a consistent place in the Kings' top order and was often deployed lower down the batting lineup.

Rizwan's breakthrough came in the 2021 season when he was appointed captain of the Multan Sultans. Under his leadership, Multan Sultans won their maiden PSL title in 2021 and finished as runners-up in the following two seasons.

Individually, Rizwan has cemented his place among PSL's elite performers, amassing 2,735 runs in 82 matches with a highest score of 110. He has recorded two centuries in the league 110* in 2023 and 105* in 2025 and 20 half-centuries. In the 2025 season, he scored 367 runs in 10 innings at an average of 52.43, including his second PSL century.

=== Other leagues ===
- Sylhet Strikers (Bangladesh Premier League): Rizwan played off and on for the Sylhet Strikers in the Bangladesh Premier League between the 2017 and 2022 seasons.
- Comilla Victorians (Bangladesh Premier League): Rizwan represented Comilla Victorians during the 2023 and 2024 seasons. He scored 351 runs in ten matches in the 2023 season at an average of over 50, helping Comilla qualify for the playoffs. In one of the league matches, he struck an unbeaten 73 off 39 balls against Khulna Tigers, guiding his team to victory.
- St Kitts and Nevis Patriots (Caribbean Premier League): Rizwan joined St Kitts and Nevis Patriots for the 2025 CPL season as a replacement for Fazalhaq Farooqi. He made an immediate impact with a match-winning 85 off 62 balls against Guyana Amazon Warriors, earning the Player of the Match award.
- Melbourne Renegades (Big Bash League): In June 2025, Rizwan was selected with the fourth overall pick by Melbourne Renegades in the draft for the 2025–26 season.

== International career ==
Rizwan made his One Day International (ODI) debut for Pakistan against Bangladesh in April 2015, scoring 67 runs off 58 balls. He made his Twenty20 International debut for Pakistan in the same series. He made his Test debut for Pakistan against New Zealand on 25 November 2016. He was out for a golden duck in his maiden Test innings.

In August 2018 he was one of the 33 players awarded a central contract for the 2018–19 season by the Pakistan Cricket Board (PCB). He captained Pakistan's team in the 2018 ACC Emerging Teams Asia Cup. Pakistan reached the semi-finals. He scored his maiden century against Australia, in March 2019, with an innings of 115 runs.

In November 2019, Rizwan was recalled to the Pakistan team against Sri Lanka. He was also selected against Australia later that month, where in the first innings of the First Test it was debated as to whether he was given out on a no ball, he scored 95 runs in the second innings.

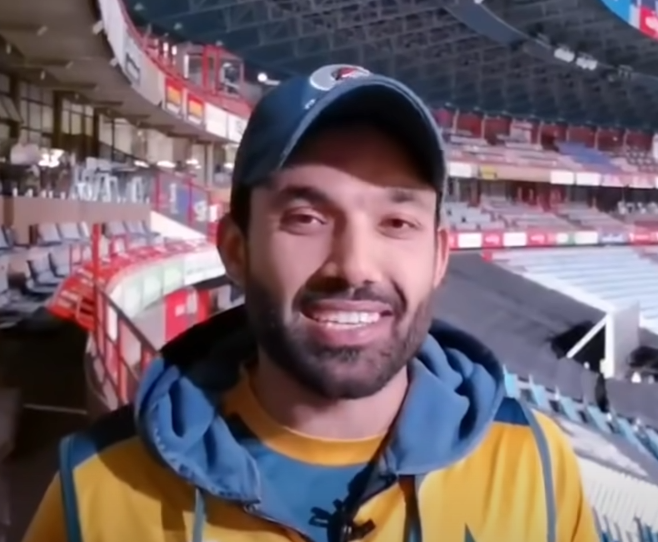
Rizwan in 2020.

In June 2020, he was named in a 29-man squad for Pakistan's tour to England during the COVID-19 pandemic. However, on 23 June 2020, Rizwan was one of seven players from Pakistan's squad to test positive for COVID-19. In July, he was shortlisted in Pakistan's 20-man squad for the Test matches against England. He had an excellent Test series, both with the bat and gloves, managing to score 161 runs with two-half centuries, therefore, cementing his place as first choice wicket-keeper in Test matches, above the returning former captain Sarfaraz Ahmed. He was named as Pakistan's player of the Test series.

In December 2020, Rizwan was named as the captain of Pakistan's Test team for the first match against New Zealand. He replaced Babar Azam, who was ruled out due to injury. In the same tour, he was also added to Pakistan's T20I squad against New Zealand. In the 3rd T20I of the series against New Zealand, Rizwan scored his career-best T20I score of 89 to give Pakistan a win and saved them from getting white-washed by New Zealand.

In February 2021, in Pakistan's series against South Africa, Rizwan scored his first century in Test cricket, with an unbeaten 115 as he was awarded the player of the series. In February 2021, in Pakistan's series against South Africa, Rizwan scored his first century in T20I cricket, with an unbeaten 104 including 6 boundaries and 7 sixes. He also became the first wicket-keeper batter for Pakistan to score a century in T20I cricket and became only the second wicket-keeper batter after Brendon McCullum to score centuries in all three formats of international cricket. He also became only the second Pakistani batter to score a century in T20I cricket after Ahmed Shehzad and also became the fifth designated wicket-keeper batter to notch a T20I century.

In April 2021, during the third T20I between Pakistan and South Africa he along with Babar Azam had a 197-run partnership for the opening wicket which is also the highest partnership recorded by a pair for Pakistan for any wicket in T20I cricket. It was also the highest ever partnership for any wicket by a pair in T20I cricket while chasing.

In September 2021, he was named in Pakistan's squad for the 2021 ICC Men's T20 World Cup. In December 2021, in the third match against the West Indies, Rizwan became the first batter to score 2,000 runs in Twenty20 cricket in a calendar year. In September 2022, Rizwan and Babar scored a record T20 cricket partnership of 203 without being dismissed.

In October 2023, Rizwan scored an unbeaten century against Sri Lanka, leading Pakistan to successfully chase a mammoth total of 345 in the 2023 Cricket World Cup.

In December 2023 and January 2024, Rizwan participated in Pakistan's tour of Australia. For the first match, he was sidelined for Sarfaraz Ahmed. After a poor showing by Sarfaraz, he was bought back into the team. In the second match's first innings, he scored 42 off 51, and then a 35 off 62 in the second innings. In the third match's first innings, he scored 88 off 103, and then a 28 off 57 in the second innings. The innings also had a FC against Victoria XI. He made 50 off 70 before retiring hurt.

In May 2024, he participated in Pakistan's tour of Ireland. In the first match, he scored just 1 run before being run out. However, he redeemed himself by scoring 75 off 46, not out in the second match. In the third and final match, he scored 58 off 38.

In May 2024, he participated in Pakistan's tour of England. The first match was washed out. In the second match, he was caught out on just the 3rd ball of the innings. The third match was also washed out. In the fourth and final match, he was bowled after scoring 23 runs off 16 balls.

In May 2024, he was named in Pakistan's squad for the 2024 ICC Men's T20 World Cup tournament. In Pakistan's first match of the tournament, against the United States, he scored only 9 runs off 8 balls before being seen off by Saurabh Netravalkar. In that same game, he took the catches of Steven Taylor and Monank Patel. In Pakistan's second match of the tournament, against India, he scored a crucial 31 runs off 44 balls, before being bowled by Jasprit Bumrah. In Pakistan's third match of the tournament against Canada, he scored a match winning knock of 53 off 53, not out. In Pakistan's fourth and last match of the tournament against Ireland, he scored 17 runs off 16 balls. Overall, in the tournament, he scored 110 runs, the 33rd most out of every participant.

In August 2024, he scored 171 not out and 51, top-scoring in each innings, in the First Test against Bangladesh at Rawalpindi cricket stadium.

In October 2024, the Pakistan Cricket Board announced Rizwan as captain of the Pakistan national cricket team for the white-ball format of One Day Internationals and Twenty20s.

In November 2024, during the second ODI against Australia, Rizwan took six catches to equal the record for the most catches in a single ODI match.

== Awards and recognition ==
- PCB's Most Valuable Cricketer of the Year for 2021
- PCB's T20I Cricketer of the Year for 2021
- Wisden Cricketers of the Year for 2021
- ICC Men's T20I Cricketer of the Year for 2021
- ICC Men's Player of the Month Award for September 2022
- Named in ICC Men's T20I Team of the Year for 2021
- Named in ICC Men's T20I Team of the Year for 2022

Preceded by Babar Azam	Pakistani national cricket captain (ODI); 2024–present	Succeeded by Incumbent
Preceded by Babar Azam	Pakistani national cricket captain (T20I); 2024–present	Succeeded by Incumbent

Awards
Preceded by Award established	ICC T20I Player of the Year; 2021	Succeeded by Suryakumar Yadav
