= Babar Azam =

Pakistani cricketer (born 1994)

Babar Azam SI
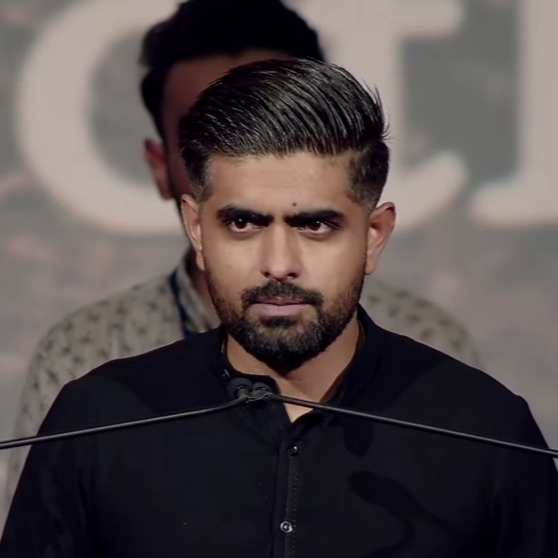
- Azam in 2023

Personal information
- Full name: Mohammad Babar Azam
- Born: 15 October 1994 (age 32); Lahore, Punjab, Pakistan
- Height: 1.83 m (6 ft 0 in)
- Batting: Right-handed
- Bowling: Right-arm off break
- Role: Batter
- Relatives: Kamran Akmal (cousin); Umar Akmal (cousin); Adnan Akmal (cousin)

International information
- National side: Pakistan (2015–present)
- Test debut (cap 222): 13 October 2016 v West Indies
- Last Test: 9 September 2026 v England
- ODI debut (cap 203): 31 May 2015 v Zimbabwe
- Last ODI: 16 November 2025 v Sri Lanka
- ODI shirt no.: 56
- T20I debut (cap 70): 7 September 2016 v England
- Last T20I: 24 February 2026 v England
- T20I shirt no.: 56

Domestic team information
- Years: Team
- 2010/11–2013/14: Zarai Taraqiati Bank
- 2012/13–2014/15: Islamabad Leopards
- 2014/15: State Bank of Pakistan
- 2015/16–2017/18: Sui Southern Gas Corporation
- 2016: Islamabad United
- 2017–2022: Karachi Kings
- 2017: Guyana Amazon Warriors
- 2017: Sylhet Sixers
- 2019–2020: Somerset
- 2019/20–2023: Central Punjab
- 2023–present: Peshawar Zalmi
- 2024: Rangpur Riders
- 2025/26: Sydney Sixers
- 2026/27: Oil & Gas Development Company Limited

Career statistics
Competition	Test	ODI	T20I	FC
Matches	66	144	145	103
Runs scored	4,771	6671	4,596	6,823
Batting average	42.98	53.36	38.94	42.37
100s/50s	9/34	20/38	3/39	12/46
Top score	196	158	122	266
Balls bowled	90	–	–	816
Wickets	2	–	–	7
Bowling average	21.00	–	–	66.57
5 wickets in innings	0	–	–	0
10 wickets in match	0	–	–	0
Best bowling	1/1	–	–	1/1
Catches/stumpings	54/–	66/–	68/–	76/–
Medal record
Men's cricket
Representing Pakistan
ICC Champions Trophy
Winner	2017 England & Wales
ICC T20 World Cup
Runner-up	2022 Australia
ACC Asia Cup
Runner-up	2022 UAE
ACC Emerging Asia Cup
Runner-up	2013 Singapore
- Source: Cricinfo, 18 October 2026

Mohammad Babar Azam (Urdu, Punjabi: محمد بابر اعظم; pronounced [muhamməd babəɾ azəm]; born 15 October 1994) is a Pakistani international cricketer and a former captain of the Pakistan national team in all three formats of the game. A right-handed top-order batter, he captains Peshawar Zalmi in the Pakistan Super League. Azam was a member of the Pakistan team that won the 2017 ICC Champions Trophy.

== Early life ==
Babar Azam was born on 15 October 1994 into a family from the Walled City of Lahore. His father Mohammad Azam Siddiqui owned a small watch repair shop while his mother is a housewife. He is the eldest of three siblings Safeer Azam, Faisal Azam and Fariya Azam. His older first cousins (through his elder paternal uncle) Kamran and Umar Akmal were the reason he was attracted to cricket, and their stories inspired him to take up cricket as his profession. He had been a ball boy at Gaddafi Stadium before joining a cricket academy and starting his domestic cricket career there.

He sought guidance from Rana Sadiq, his first coach, who taught him the fundamentals of batting. Later, he went on to be a part of the Pakistan under-19 setup.

== International career ==
=== Early career ===
On 31 May 2015, Azam was included in the Pakistan ODI squad for the home series against Zimbabwe. He made his ODI debut in the third ODI on 31 May and scored an impressive fifty scoring 54 runs off 60 balls. His impressive debut earned him a place in both Test and ODI squads selected for an away series against Sri Lanka. He was not selected to play in the Test series. During the ODI series, he only scored 37 runs in the two matches that he played. Azam was included in the squad for the away ODI series against Zimbabwe in September 2015.

He was retained in the One Day squad for the home series against England. In the first ODI of the four match series he scored 62 not out with a strike rate of 100. He had scores of 4, 22 and 51 in next three matches respectively. He finished the series with 139 runs at an average of 46.33.

In January 2016, Pakistan visited New Zealand. In the first ODI match, Azam scored 62 runs off 76 balls. Pakistan lost the match by 70 runs. He was the leading run scorer in the ODI series with 145 runs in 2 innings at an average of 72.50.

In the five-match ODI series against England in July, he batted in five games and only scored 122 runs. He made his Twenty20 International debut for Pakistan against England on 7 September. He scored an unbeaten 15 runs off 11 balls. Pakistan won the match and series.

Besides the England series, Pakistan played two match ODI series against Ireland. In the first ODI of the series, Pakistan beat Ireland by 255 runs and created record of their biggest win in terms of runs in an ODI. Azam contributed in his team's victory by scoring 29 runs. With the second and final ODI abandoned due to rain, Pakistan won the series 1–0.

=== Rise in shorter formats and breaking records ===
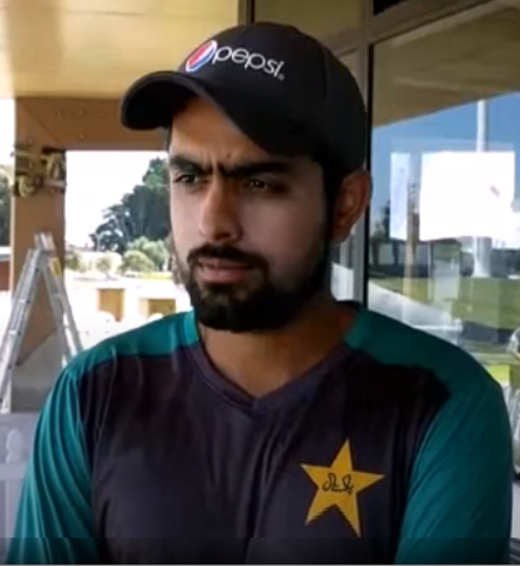
Azam in 2018

Azam was selected in the home series against the West Indies in 2016. In the first match of the ODI series he scored his maiden international century, scoring 120 off 131 balls and earning his first man of the Match award. In the second ODI, he scored another century, this time scoring 123 off 126 balls, and contributing to Pakistan's total of over 330 runs. In the third and final ODI of the series Azam scored a third consecutive century (117 from 106). He also set the record for most runs (360) in a three match ODI series. He became the only batsman to score 350+ runs in a three match ODI series.

He made his Test debut for Pakistan against the West Indies in Dubai on 13 October 2016 and scored 69 runs in his first innings. He was the first player to score a fifty on his Test debut through a day/night Test.

On 19 January 2017, in the third ODI against Australia, Azam became then joint-fastest player to score 1,000 runs in ODIs and then fastest for Pakistan in his 21st innings before his record was later surpassed by his compatriot Fakhar Zaman. He scored a century in the fifth ODI, which was only the second century ever scored by a Pakistani batsman in Australia after Zaheer Abbas in 1981. He also entered the top 10 batsmen's ranking in ODIs for the first time ever.

Sarfaraz Ahmed replaced Azhar Ali as Pakistan's ODI team captain against the West Indies after Azhar Ali stepped down from the captaincy after a defeat against Australia in ODI series. Azam scored an unbeaten 125 in the 2nd ODI of the three–match ODI series at Providence Stadium, Guyana. Azam along with Imad Wasim put on an unbeaten 99 runs partnership which helped Pakistan to a total of 282.

In the Champions Trophy 2017, Azam scored 46 off 52 balls in the final match against India. After a successful Champions trophy tour, ICC sent the World XI team in Pakistan where they played three T20I matches. Azam was the top runs-getter in the series, scoring 179. In the first T20I played at Gaddafi Stadium, Lahore, he scored 86 playing only 52 balls, and won his first Man of the match award in T20Is, helping Pakistan win the match by 20 runs. He had scores of 45 and 48 in the next two fixtures.

In September 2017, he had a poor Test series against Sri Lanka, where he managed to score only 39 runs across 2 Test matches. In the second ODI he became the fastest batsman to score 7th ODI century in ODIs and the first batsman in ODI history to score five consecutive centuries in one country. He had scores of 30 and 69 (not out) in next two innings while chasing.

He was the leading runs-scorer for Pakistan in 2016 in ODIs and T20Is with 872 and 352 runs respectively. At the 2017 PCB awards, he was awarded Pakistan's ODI Player of the year. He was also listed in 2017's ICC World ODI XI for the first time ever.

Pakistan's first assignment in 2018 was tour to New Zealand. Azam was an automatic selection in the ODI team. However he could score only 0, 10, 8, 3, 10 across 5 innings, scoring only 31 runs at an average of 6.2 as Pakistan were whitewashed 5–0, his worst series until date. But performed well in the T20I series and contributed in team's winning the series 2–1. Azam was the leading run scorer with 109 runs. He had scores of 41, 50* and 18 in these T20Is. He became the no.1 T20I batsmen, the second to reach the feat after Misbah-ul-Haq, but soon slipped to no. 3 position. He regained no. 1 spot in the rankings after a successful series against West Indies, who were touring Pakistan after thirteen years. His best performance came in the second T20I where he scored an unbeaten 97 runs which won him a Man of the match award. He finished the series as leading run-getter with 165 runs at an average of 82.50 and a strike rare of 148.64, and won the man of the series. Pakistan won the series 3–0.Babar, Fakhar lead Pakistan to 3–0.

During a Test match against England in May 2018, Azam was struck on the arm without padding by a bouncer from Ben Stokes, when he was batting on 68. After an X-ray examination, it was confirmed that Azam had a fracture in his left wrist with a broken forearm. After fully recovering from his injury, he made his return to the team against Zimbabwe in July for a five-match ODI series. He performed well and managed to score 184 runs at an average of 184 in 4 innings including 76 balls 106 runs in the final odi of the series.

In September 2018, he was selected for 2018 Asia Cup held in United Arab Emirates (UAE). Playing his first Asia Cup, he didn't have a good time of it, only managing to score 156 runs at an average of 31.20 in 5 matches. In November 2018, in the second Test against New Zealand, Azam scored his first century in Test cricket.

In January 2019, in a feature for Cricinfo, Osman Samiuddin highlighted Azam’s exceptional record against elite fast bowling early in his career, focusing particularly on his performances against South African pacer Dale Steyn. Using comparative metrics, the article noted that Babar had handled Steyn, widely regarded as the greatest fast bowler of the 21st century, with a level of composure and technical assurance unmatched by most contemporary batsmen. Samiuddin discussed how Babar’s balance, timing, and ability to play late allowed him to neutralise Steyn’s pace and movement, framing their encounters as an early indication of Babar’s rise among the world’s premier batters.

=== 2019 Cricket World Cup ===
In April 2019, he was named in Pakistan's squad for the 2019 Cricket World Cup. The International Cricket Council (ICC) named him as one of the five exciting talents making their Cricket World Cup debut. In May 2019, he was also signed by Somerset as their overseas player for the 2019 t20 Blast.

Just before the World Cup, Pakistan played against England in one-off T20I and 5-match ODI series to prepare for the tournament. In the T20I fixture he scored 65 from 42 balls before getting run-out. In the 5-match ODI series, he ended up as the joint leading runs-scorer, scoring 277 runs including a century and two half-centuries, going into the World Cup with runs under his belt. On 26 June 2019, in the match against New Zealand, Azam became the fastest batsman for Pakistan, in terms of innings, to score 3,000 runs in ODIs (68). In the same match, he also scored his 10th century in ODIs, finishing 101 not out, with Pakistan winning by 6 wickets. With this century, he also became the first middle-order batsman from Pakistan to hit a century in a World Cup match after 32 years. A week later, in the match against Bangladesh, Azam broke Javed Miandad's record of the most runs by a Pakistani batsman in a single edition of the World Cup, scoring 474 runs in 8 innings.

=== Test performances and leadership roles ===
In September 2019, before the home series against Sri Lanka, he was named as the vice-captain of Pakistan cricket team in both ODIs and T20Is, on the back of his consistent performances in these formats. After the first ODI was washed out, Pakistan managed to win both of the remaining matches to clinch the series 2–0. He scored his 11th ton in the second ODI and became the fastest Pakistani player to reach 1,000 ODI runs in terms of innings in a calendar year beating the previous record of Javed Miandad. In October 2019, he was named captain of the Pakistan cricket team in T20Is, ahead of the Australia series.

"I thought Azam was extremely impressive. Looks to have a lot of class and could well become one of the best batsmen in the world."

— Ricky Ponting on Babar Azam's performances on Australian Tour.

In the first Test of the series, he scored his second Test century, against a strong bowling line up. He missed out on his second consecutive century when he was dismissed on 97 in the second Test match. He scored 210 runs with an average of 52.50.

In December 2019, Sri Lanka returned to Pakistan for a two-match Test series. This marked the return of Test cricket in Pakistan after a decade's absence, with Rawalpindi Cricket Stadium hosting the first Test match. Azam, batting in his first ever Test inning on home soil, scored an unbeaten quick-fire century on day 5 of the rain-affected match, resulting in a draw. In the Second Test, played at National Stadium, he scored 60 and 100 not out respectively, ending the series with 262 runs with an average of exactly 262. Pakistan won the match by 263 runs, winning the series 1–0. In January 2020, he was named in 2019's ICC World ODI XI, making the list for the second time.

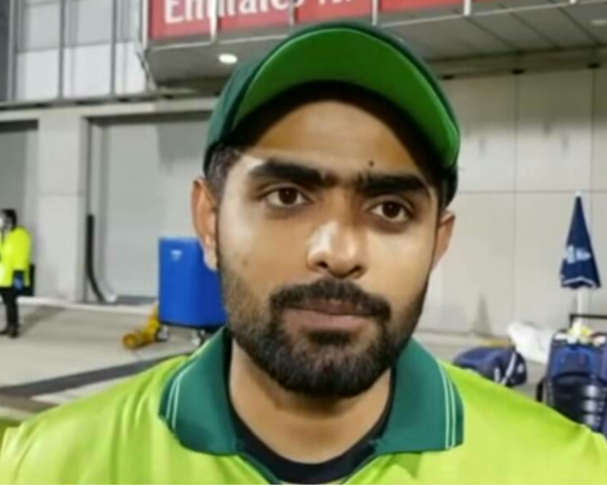
Azam in 2020

In January 2020, Bangladesh toured Pakistan for a three-match T20I series, with Azam captaining Pakistan for the first time at home. Pakistan won the T20I series 2–0, with the third match abandoned due to rain. It was Pakistan's first series win under his captaincy and his first Player of the series award as captain. In the first match of the Test series, he scored fluent 143 runs, beating his previous career best score of 127*. In May 2020, he was appointed as ODI captain as well. In June 2020, he was named as the T20I captain in a 29-man squad for Pakistan's tour to England during the COVID-19 pandemic to play three Tests and three T20Is. In July, he was shortlisted in Pakistan's 20-man squad for the Test matches against England. During the first day of the first Test, he scored an attacking unbeaten 69 runs in difficult conditions, to help his team get out of danger, his knock earned him appreciation from former England captains, Nasser Hussain and Michael Vaughan.

"On a positive note Babar Azam is certainly one of the best Test players in the World, love the way he plays."

— Michael Vaughan on Azam's performances on England Tour.

"It's the fab five and Babar Azam is in that."

— Nasser Hussain on Azam's knock in the first test on England Tour.

In the third and final Test of the series, he scored his 2,000th run in Test cricket, achieving the feat in his 29th Test. He finished the series with 195 runs at an average of 48.75 in five innings with two half-centuries.

In the second T20I against England, he became the joint-fastest batsman to score 1,500 runs in T20Is, reaching the milestone in 39 innings. He finished the series with 77 runs in two innings. Pakistan drew the series 1–1, after winning the third and final T20I, with the first match being washed out.

On 8 September 2020, he slipped to number two position in the T20I batsmen ranking after leading it for 22 months. He captained the team for the first time in ODIs in Pakistan's home series against Zimbabwe. Pakistan won the series 2–1. He scored 221 runs including a century score of 125 runs in the 3rd and final ODI and was named as Man of the series. In the first T20I of the series against Zimbabwe, he scored 82 runs, becoming the first batsman to score more than 1,000 runs in T20 cricket for the second consecutive year.

On 10 November 2020, Azam was appointed captain of Pakistan's Test team, ahead of their tour to New Zealand. He suffered a thumb injury while practicing and was ruled out of the Test series and later from the T20I series as well.

On 26 December 2022, Azam breaks the 16-year-old record of scoring the most runs in a calendar year by a Pakistan batter, going past Mohammad Yousuf. He achieved this feat while batting in the first Test of New Zealand tour of Pakistan at National Stadium, Karachi. He also achieved the feat of highest run scorer in Test cricket for the year 2022 in the same match, going past England's Joe Root.

=== No. 1 ODI batsman ===
In April 2021, while playing against South Africa in the first ODI, Azam scored his 13th ODI century in his 76th innings, making him the quickest to reach this mark, surpassing the record of Hashim Amla who took 83 innings to achieve the record. At the end of the series, he became the No. 1 ODI batsman, with 865 points, surpassing Virat Kohli who had previously been the top-rated ODI batsman for 1258 days.

=== 2021–present ===
On 14 April 2021, Azam scored his maiden T20I century (122), in a winning cause against South Africa in the Centurion Stadium. He and Mohammad Rizwan shared a partnership of 197 runs, which is the highest partnership for Pakistan in T20Is and the fourth-highest partnership of all time in the format. On 25 April 2021, in the third T20I against Zimbabwe, Azam became the fastest batsman, in terms of innings, to score 2,000 runs in T20Is, doing so in his 52nd innings. In September 2021, Azam was named as the captain of Pakistan's squad for the 2021 ICC Men's T20 World Cup. During the tournament he regained his position as the number one T20I batsman in the rankings. Azam has broken the record of most fifties (4) and runs (303) in a T20 World Cup edition. He led Pakistan to the semi-finals, where they lost to Australia, ending their campaign. In March 2022, Australia toured Pakistan after 24 years, in the second test match of the series, during which he scored 196 runs and broke the record of most runs by a captain in the fourth innings of a test. A week later, during the first ODI against Australia played at Gaddafi Stadium, he became the second fastest overall and fastest Asian to score 4,000 ODI runs, achieving the feat in his 82nd inning. Few days later, during the second ODI match, he became the first Pakistani skipper to score an ODI century against Australia, also becoming the fastest batter overall in terms of innings (83) to score 15th ODI century, and helped Pakistan to register their highest successful run chase in ODIs. In the third and decider match of the series, he scored yet another hundred which helped Pakistan chase 211 runs comfortably and win the series 2–1. This was Pakistan's first ODI series win against Australia since 2002. He was titled man of the match for second consecutive time in the series and also man of the series for his 276 runs with an average of 138.00.

Azam captained Pakistan in the 2022 ICC Men’s T20 World Cup. In the semi-final against New Zealand on 9 November, he scored 53 runs off 42 balls and, alongside Mohammad Rizwan (57 off 43 balls), shared a crucial partnership that guided Pakistan to chase 153/3 in 19.1 overs, winning by seven wickets. In the T20 World Cup final on 13 November 2022, Azam scored 32 runs off 28 balls as captain, but Pakistan were defeated by England, who chased 138/5 to win by five wickets with six balls remaining, leaving Pakistan as runners-up.

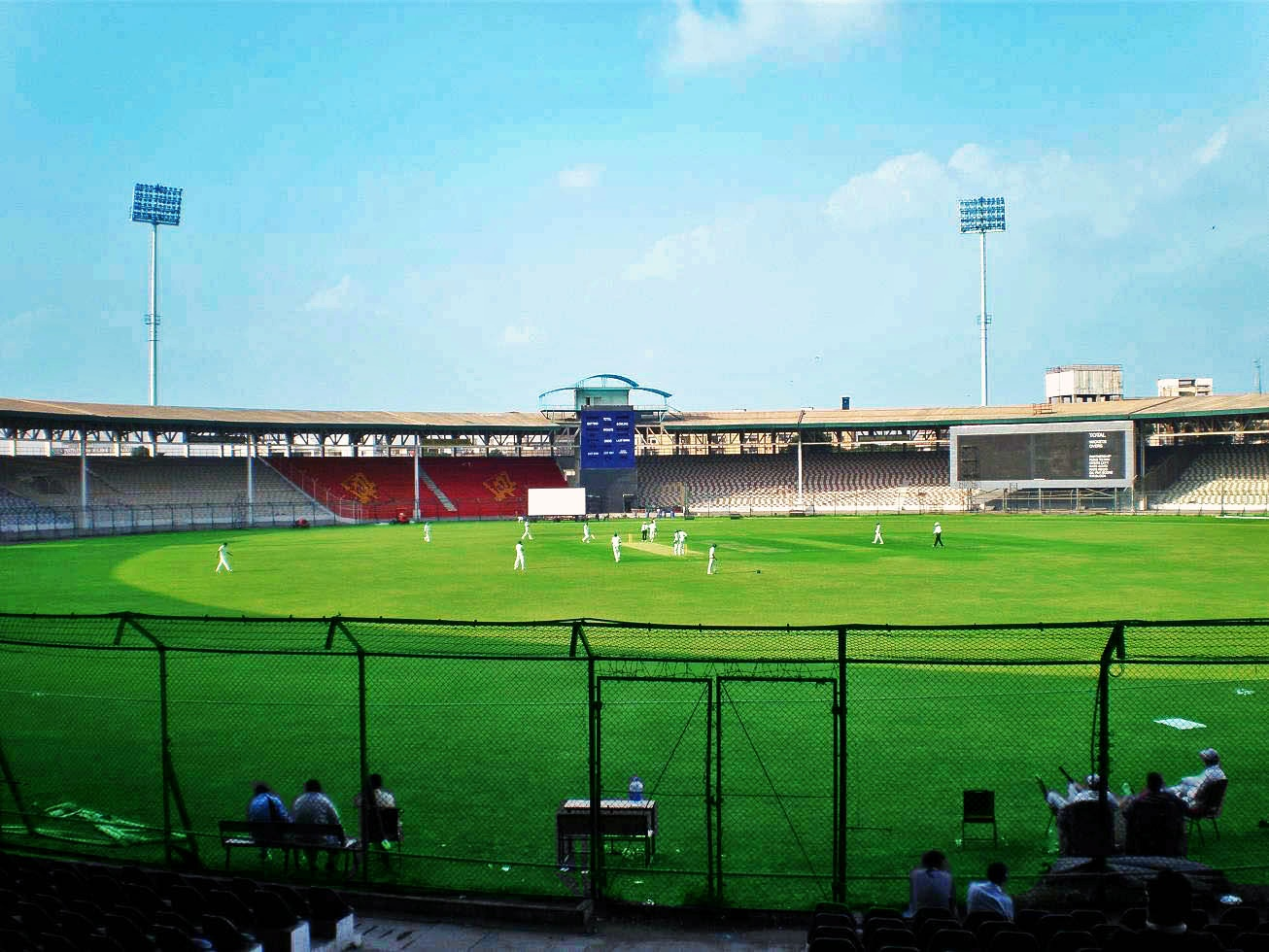
National Stadium, Karachi, where Azam has scored centuries in all three formats of the game.

On 14 April 2023, in the first T20I against New Zealand, Azam played in his 100th T20I match, becoming the third Pakistani player to so. On 15 April 2023, he claimed his third T20I century, scoring 101 runs off 58 balls, becoming the first captain to score three centuries in T20Is. He led his team to a 38-run victory over New Zealand in the second T20I, becoming the joint player to secure most wins in T20Is as captain (42).

On 5 May 2023, during the 4th ODI against New Zealand, he became the fastest batter in the history of ODI cricket to score 5000 runs in terms of inning (97), in the same match he scored his 18th ODI century becoming the fastest to do so. Pakistan won the match by 102 runs and under his captaincy Pakistan became no. 1 ODI team after 33 years.

On 30 August 2023, Azam became the fastest player to score 19 One Day International centuries, achieving the feat in just 102 innings. He broke the previous record held by Hashim Amla, who reached the milestone in 104 innings. Azam achieved this record during the 2023 Asia Cup, where he scored 151 runs against Nepal.

On 15 November 2023, Azam resigned from captaincy in all formats following Pakistan's disappointing World Cup campaign. However, he was reappointed as Pakistan's limited overs captain on 31 March 2024.

In May 2024, he was named the captain in Pakistan's squad for the 2024 ICC Men's T20 World Cup tournament. On 1 October 2024, Azam resigned from the limited overs captaincy for a second time citing his workload and his desire to focus on his batting.

On 13 October 2024, Azam became the fastest Asian batter to reach 11000 runs in international cricket.

In March 2025, first time in his career, he was dropped from T20 squad. In October 2025 after an absence of 8 months from T20 format, he was selected again for the T20 series against South Africa and Zimbabwe .

On 31 October 2025, he hit 4,234 runs and became the highest run-scorer in T20 Internationals, surpassing Rohit Sharma's 4,231 during the home series against South Africa. In the third T20I, he produced a commanding innings of 68 off 47 balls, guiding Pakistan in their chase of 140 to a six-wicket win with an over to spare. It was his 37th T20I half-century, his first since May 2024, and helped Pakistan clinch the series 2–1. For his performance, he was named Player of the Match, and he also surpassed Virat Kohli in the number of 50-plus T20I scores, reaching 40 in 124 innings.

In the 2nd ODI of the home series against Sri Lanka, played on 14 November 2025, Pakistan chased down Sri Lanka’s target of 289 to secure the series victory. Azam ended a prolonged century drought, hitting his first international century in more than two years, also scoring his 20th ODI hundred, a landmark that allowed him to equal Saeed Anwar’s Pakistan record for most ODI centuries. His innings anchored Pakistan’s chase, with the senior batters contributing to a comfortable win. He was declared Player of the Match.

On 5 July 2026, Babar Azam was reappointed as Pakistan’s test captain after Shan Masood was relieved from the captaincy.

Babar Azam scored 50 off 36 balls in the third T20I against Australia in February 2026, surpassing Virat Kohli to become the player with the most fifties in T20 internationals.

== Domestic and franchise cricket ==
=== Quaid-e-Azam Trophy and National T20 Cup ===
Azam initially played domestic cricket for the Zarai Taraqiati Bank Limited cricket team and for Islamabad Leopards as an emerging player. For next couple of years, he played first-class cricket for State Bank of Pakistan cricket team and Sui Southern Gas Company cricket team in the Quaid-e-Azam Trophy respectively.

In September 2019, Azam was named as the captain of the newly formed Central Punjab for the 2019–20 domestic season. His team went on to win the trophy after defeating Northern in the final. He led his team in the 2019–20 National T20 Cup. In his first match for them, he scored a century, becoming the first Pakistani cricketer to score three centuries as well as more than 1,500 runs in Twenty20 cricket in a calendar year.

He was retained by Central Punjab for the 2020–21 domestic season, both as a player and captain of the team. On 12 October 2020, during the match against Balochistan, he became the fastest batsman in terms of innings (27) to score 1,000 runs in National T20 Cup's history. In October 2021, in the 2021–22 National T20 Cup, he became the fastest batsman, in terms of innings, to score 7,000 runs in T20 cricket (187). In August–September 2024, Babar Azam played in the Bahria town champions cup by PCB for the ABL Stallions.

=== Pakistan Super League ===
Azam's record in PSL matches
Matches	Runs	HS	100s	50s	Avg.	SR.
111	4380	115	4	39	47.09	129.70

Azam represented Islamabad United in the inaugural season of the Pakistan Super League. Before the 2017 PSL players draft he moved to Karachi Kings. He performed well in the 2017 season, scoring 291 runs at a batting average of 32.33 runs per innings and finishing the tournament as the second leading runs-scorer behind his cousin Kamran Akmal. He was retained by the Kings for the 2018 season and was the third-highest run-scorer with five half-centuries. He was again retained ahead of the 2019 Pakistan Super League. Before the 2020 season, he was appointed as vice captain of the franchise. He was leading runs scorer in Pakistan Super League 2020. He scored 473 runs with an average of 59.12. He led his team to PSL final victory. He won man of the match award in Qualifier and Final. He was also Player of the tournament in 2020 season. In the 2021 season, he scored 554 runs with an average of 69.25, breaking his own record of most runs in a single PSL edition. However, this record was broken in the next season by Fakhar Zaman. In December 2021, he was named as the captain of the Karachi Kings following the players' draft for the 2022 Pakistan Super League. Prior to the 2023 Pakistan Super League, Azam was traded by Karachi to Peshawar Zalmi in exchange for Haider Ali and Shoaib Malik while Peshawar also received the first pick in the supplementary round. Azam was also announced as Peshawar's captain, replacing Wahab Riaz. In the 2024 Pakistan Super League he scored 569 runs in eleven matches with an average of 56.90. In the 2026 Pakistan Super League, Azam scored 588 runs in 11 innings at an average of 73.50 and a strike rate of 145.90, including two centuries and three half-centuries. He equalled the record for the most runs in a single PSL season and became only the second batter to score two centuries in a PSL season. His two centuries also took his career tally to four PSL centuries, jointly the most in the tournament's history with Usman Khan. Azam led Peshawar Zalmi to the title, winning his first PSL trophy as captain.

=== Other leagues ===
In 2016, he was signed by Bangladesh Premier League (BPL) franchise Rangpur Riders, (later renamed as Rangpur Rangers), however due to national duties, he could not participate. In 2017, Azam played for Guyana Amazon Warriors in the Caribbean Premier League and Sylhet Sixers in the BPL. In 2019, Somerset signed Azam for the 2019 t20 Blast county cricket competition. He was the competition's highest run-scorer with 578 runs in 13 matches including four half-centuries and one century and recorded a batting average of 52.54 runs per innings. In January 2019, it was announced that he would rejoin Somerset for 12 matches in the 2020 t20 Blast as well as for two first-class matches. In August 2020, Somerset confirmed his participation, and was available after fulfilling his national duties. On 16 September 2020, in the match against Glamorgan, he registered his career best score of 114 not out off 62 balls and also completed his 5,000 runs in T20s, becoming the third fastest in the world and fastest Asian in terms of innings to achieve the milestone. The century against Glamorgan was also the first hit by a batsman in a T20 game at Sophia Gardens. He ended the season with 218 runs in 7 matches with an average of 36.33, finishing as team's second highest runs-getter. However, Somerset did not qualify for the quarter-finals. For the 2025–26 Big Bash League season, Sydney Sixers signed Azam.

In 2026, Babar Azam returned to first-class cricket after a 7-year absence, joining the Oil & Gas Development Company Limited cricket team in the 2026–27 President's Trophy Grade-I.

== Playing style and technique ==
=== Batting style ===
Azam is a right-handed top-order batsman known for his classical technique, balance, and consistency across all formats. He is recognised for his composure at the crease and his ability to play both pace and spin effectively. Azam usually bats at number three in the top order in limited-overs cricket and at number four in Test cricket, providing stability to Pakistan’s middle order and building long innings against quality bowling attacks. His approach emphasizes timing, placement, and rotation of strike rather than power hitting. He adapts effectively to different match situations and conditions, blending classical technique with modern shot selection. Analysts and former cricketers frequently cite his technical proficiency, temperament under pressure, and consistency as key factors contributing to his success across formats.

=== Signature shots ===
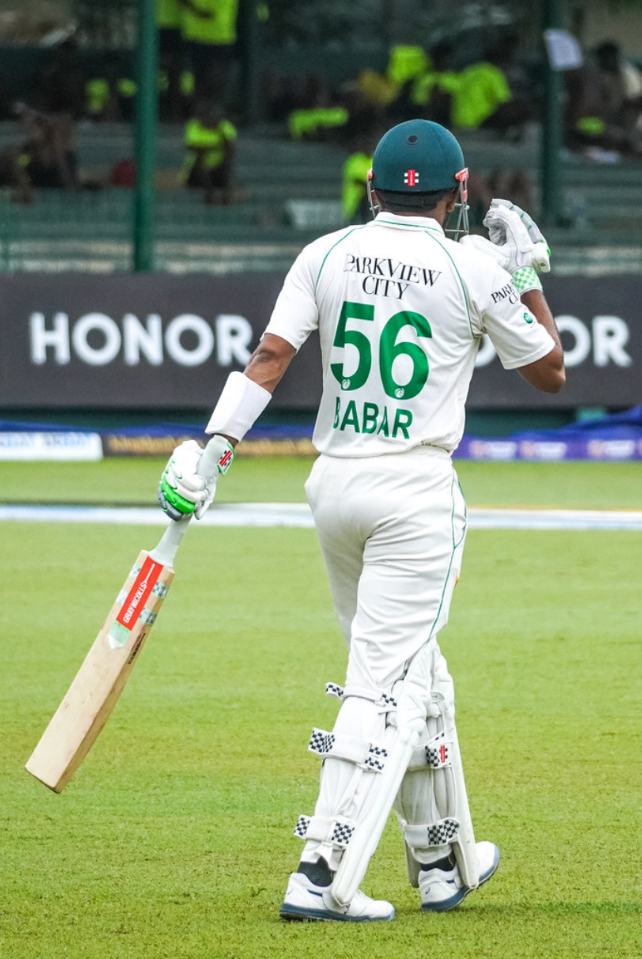
Azam during the second Test match at SSC Colombo, 25 July 2023

Azam’s repertoire of shots includes the cover drive, on-drive, flick through midwicket, square cut, pull shot, and late cut, with the cover drive being considered his trademark. He frequently rotates strike to maintain a steady scoring rate and punishes loose deliveries with precision. His elegant stroke play and shot selection have earned him praise from cricket analysts and former players alike, including Imran Khan and Ricky Ponting.

=== Reception ===
Several commentators have spoken highly of Azam’s batting. Former Pakistani bowler and commentator Wasim Akram described Azam as a great batsman, comparing him to Brian Lara and Sachin Tendulkar. Former Pakistani cricketer and commentator Rameez Raja has also praised his batting technique and temperament. Former West Indian cricketer and commentator Ian Bishop believes Azam could become one of the greatest white-ball cricketers of all time, particularly in the ODI format. Other notable commentators who have praised Azam include former England captain Nasser Hussain and former Bangladesh cricketer Athar Ali Khan.

== Impact and influence ==
Azam is renowned for his classical batting technique, graceful timing, and consistent performances across all formats. He became the fastest Asian to reach 11,000 international runs and later went on to become the fifth fastest overall and the second fastest Pakistani batsman to score 15,000 international runs across all formats, highlighting his consistency and dominance in modern cricket. He is also among the leading run-scorers in T20 Internationals, reflecting his adaptability in modern cricket. His elegant stroke play, particularly through the covers, has drawn comparisons to some of the game’s greatest batsmen, while his balance of aggression and control has made him one of the most dependable players of his era. As captain, he is recognised for his calm temperament, tactical awareness, and ability to inspire confidence within his team. Under his leadership, Pakistan has achieved several significant victories and shown greater unity, professionalism, and composure across formats.

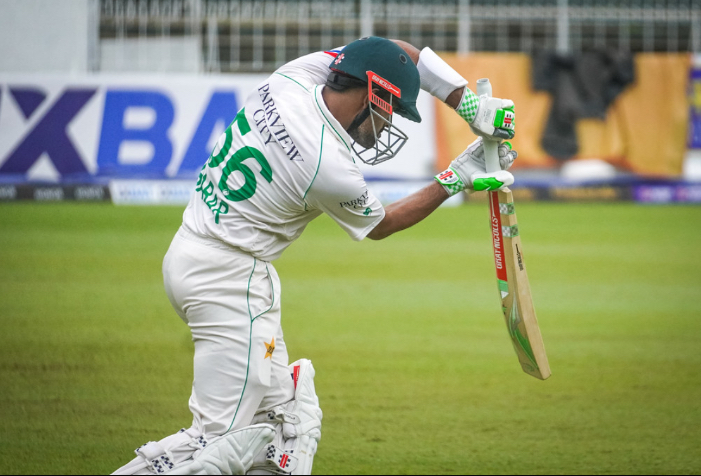
Azam batting in Sri Lanka

== Records and achievements ==
Centuries against different nations
Opponent	Test	ODI	T20I	Total
Australia	2	3	–	5
Bangladesh	1	–	–	1
England	1	2	1	4
Nepal	–	1	–	1
New Zealand	2	2	1	5
South Africa	–	1	1	2
Sri Lanka	3	4	–	7
West Indies	–	5	–	5
Zimbabwe	–	2	–	2
Total	9	20	3	32

He is the third-fastest Pakistani batsman to reach 1000 runs in ODI cricket (21 innings). He is also the joint fastest Pakistani batsman to reach 2000 runs in ODI cricket (45 innings), along with Zaheer Abbas. Azam is also the second fastest Asian batsman to reach 3000 runs in ODI cricket (68 innings). He has set a new record by becoming the fastest player to score 5000 runs in ODI cricket (97 innings). He also holds the record to score the most runs in the first 25 innings of his career (1306 runs). Azam is the fastest batsman to score 7, 13, 14, 15, 16, 17 and 18 ODI centuries. With 19 centuries in ODIs he has the second most centuries in the format for a Pakistani batter only behind Saeed Anwar's 20. He is the only batsman in history to score 3 consecutive centuries twice due to which cricket analyst Rehan Ul-Haq termed Azam as the "undisputed king of this format" after one of his record-breaking performances in ODIs and is now known as "King Babar" (Wisden) He is the fastest captain to reach 1000 ODI runs in 13 innings. He has the highest number of runs with 303 runs in the 2021 T20 World Cup. He is also the fastest batsman, in terms of time taken, to reach 1000 runs in T20Is (26 innings). Azam has also scored the most runs for Pakistan in a single World Cup (474 runs in 2019 World Cup). He has been the top ODI scorer for Pakistan in 2016, 2017, 2019, 2021 and 2022. Azam has also been the top Test scorer for Pakistan in 2018, 2019 and 2022. He has the highest Test score for a captain and for Pakistan in the fourth innings of a Test match. He is the first Pakistani captain to beat India in a World Cup match. Azam is also the first Pakistani to win the ICC ODI cricketer of the year, a feat he has achieved twice. He has the highest individual score for a Pakistani captain in ODIs with his 158 against England in 2021. He is the fastest batsman to reach 2000 and 2500 T20I runs. He is one of 3 Pakistani batsman to score a century in all formats and has the highest T20I score as well as the most centuries in the format for Pakistan. In the PSL he is the highest run scorer in the 2020 and 2021 with 473 and 554 runs as well as the league's all-time leading run scorer. He is the first Pakistani Capitan and fifth overall to complete 1000 runs across all formats. He was the first Pakistani and fourth captain to score a century in every format. The 425 balls he faced in the second test against Australia in Karachi in 2022 is the fourth most by a player in the fourth innings of a Test match. He also has the record for the second-most minutes batted in the fourth innings of a match. In 2022, he broke Ricky Ponting's record for most fifty plus scored in a calendar year with 25 scores greater than fifty. At the age of 28, he becomes the youngest cricketer ever to get honored with the prestigious Sitara-e-Imtiaz. Pakistan's third highest civilian award.

== Awards ==
=== 2017 ===
- He was named in the ICC Men's ODI Team of the Year 2017
- PCB's ODI Cricketer of the Year: 2017

=== 2018 ===
- PCB's T20I Cricketer of the Year: 2017

=== 2019 ===
- He was named in the ICC Men's ODI Team of the Year 2019

=== 2020 ===
- 2020 Pakistan Super League Player of the Tournament
- ARY News Person of the Year 2020

=== 2021 ===
- Named as ICC Men's ODI Cricketer of the Year 2021
- Named as captain of the ICC Men's T20I Team of the Year 2021
- Named as captain of the ICC Men's ODI Team of the Year 2021
- Named as captain of the 2021 ICC Men's T20 World Cup Team of the Tournament
- Winner of ICC Player of the Month for April 2021
- PCB's ODI Cricketer of the Year: 2021

=== 2022 ===
- Named as ICC Cricketer of the Year ( Sir Garfield Sobers Trophy): 2022
- Named as ICC Men's ODI Cricketer of the Year 2022
- Named as captain of the ICC Men's ODI Team of the Year 2022
- Named in the ICC Men's Test Team of the Year 2022
- Winner of ICC Player of the Month for March 2022

=== 2023 ===
- On 23 March 2023, he was awarded the Sitara-i-Imtiaz, Pakistan's third highest civilian award. At the age of 28, he becomes the youngest cricketer ever to get honored with the prestigious Sitara-e-Imtiaz.
- Winner of ICC Player of the Month for August 2023
- Named in the ICC Men's T20I Team of the Year 2024

Preceded by Sarfaraz Ahmed	Pakistani national cricket captain (T20I); 2019–2023	Succeeded by Shaheen Afridi
Preceded by Sarfaraz Ahmed	Pakistani national cricket captain (ODI); 2020–2023	Succeeded by Mohammad Rizwan
Preceded by Azhar Ali	Pakistani national cricket captain (Test); 2020–2023	Succeeded by Shan Masood
Preceded by Shaheen Afridi	Pakistani national cricket captain (T20I); 2024	Succeeded by Mohammad Rizwan
Preceded by Shan Masood	Pakistani national cricket captain (Test); 2026–	Succeeded by Incumbent

Awards
Preceded by Rohit Sharma	ICC ODI Player of the Year; 2021–2022	Succeeded by Virat Kohli
Preceded by Shaheen Afridi	Sir Garfield Sobers Trophy; 2022	Succeeded by Pat Cummins
