= Karachi Kings–Lahore Qalandars rivalry =

Cricket rivalry

Karachi Kings–Lahore Qalandars Rivalry
- Sport: Cricket
- Location: Karachi, Sindh (Karachi Kings); Lahore, Punjab (Lahore Qalandars)
- Teams: Karachi Kings (KK); Lahore Qalandars (LQ)
- First meeting: 5 February 2016; Karachi Kings won by 7 wickets
- Latest meeting: 23 April 2026; Karachi Kings won by 5 wickets
- Next meeting: PSL 2027
- Stadiums: National Stadium (Karachi); Gaddafi Stadium (Lahore)

Statistics
- Total meetings: 24
- Most wins: Karachi Kings (16)
- Most player appearances: Imad Wasim (16)
- All-time record: Karachi Kings: 16; Lahore Qalandars: 8
- All-time series (PSL only): KK: 16; LQ: 8
- Trophy series: Mathematical Legend Board
- Largest victory: By runs: KK beat LQ by 67 runs (2023); By wickets: KK beat LQ by 10 wickets (2020)
- Longest win streak: 5, Karachi Kings, (18 February 2022 to 14 April 2025)
- Current win streak: 2, Karachi Kings (29 March 2026–present)

The Karachi Kings–Lahore Qalandars rivalry is a cricket rivalry between two teams in the Pakistan Super League (PSL), an old city rivalry between the cricket teams of Karachi and Lahore that has continued in the PSL as well. It is considered to be the biggest rivalry in the PSL, fuelled in part by the size of the two cities, the two most populous in the country, that they play for and their historic economic and cultural rivalry. A Karachi–Lahore clash is known typically as a heated contest which "brings out the best in players". The two cities share a rivalry in domestic cricket that dates back to the 1950s and 1960s, with the PSL providing a high-voltage platform that allows it to thrive. It is sometimes also known as the "El Clásico of PSL".

Both teams have played on 24 occasions against each other, with Karachi Kings winning 16 of them. In 2016 season, Kings won both games against Qalandars. While in 2nd season both teams won against each other. Karachi won the first game of the 2018 season, while the second match was a close contest which ended in a tie, in the end Lahore winning in the super over due to excellent super over bowled by Qalandars' Sunil Narine. In the 2019 season, both teams won one game each while in the 2020 season, both teams won one game apiece before facing off in the final which Karachi won by 5 wickets. In 2021, Lahore won the first game in Karachi by 6 wickets while the second game was won by Karachi in Abu Dhabi by 7 runs. In 2022, Lahore won the first game in Karachi by 6 wickets while Karachi won the second game by 22 runs. In the 2023 and 2024 editions, Karachi won both the games against Lahore. In 2025, Lahore won the first game by 65 runs while Karachi emerged victorious in the second by 4 wickets. Both the teams again faced each other in the eliminator 1 in which Lahore defeated Karachi by 6 wickets.

== List of PSL titles ==
Team	Title(s)	Seasons won	Number of seasons played
Karachi Kings	1	2020	11
Lahore Qalandars	3	2022, 2023,2025	11

=== Head-to-Head Fixtures ===
Seasons	Total Matches	Karachi won	Lahore won	Series
2016 PSL	2	2	0	2–0
2017 PSL	2	1	1	1–1
2018 PSL	2	1	1	1–1
2019 PSL	2	1	1	1–1
2020 PSL	2	1	1	1–1
2020 PSL Final	1	1	0	1–0
2021 PSL	2	1	1	1–1
2022 PSL	2	1	1	1–1
2023 PSL	2	2	0	2–0
2024 PSL	2	2	0	2–0
2025 PSL	3	1	2	1–2
2026 PSL	2	2	0	2–0
Total	24	16	8	16–8

== In popular culture ==
The rivalry was referenced in episode one ("Stewie's First Word") of season 19 of the American animated sitcom Family Guy. At the start of the episode, Peter, Cleveland, Quagmire and Joe are sitting at the bar, where Quagmire complains about the influx of foreign sports fans on Saturday mornings, "like those Pakistani cricket hooligans". Two Pakistani supporters wearing Lahore jerseys retort: "If you're not rooting for Lahore, please you may leave I can tell you" and "Lahore cricketers are the best and the others are not the best, dear friends". Joe, who is apparently supporting Karachi, quickly covers his jersey as he doesn't "have a death wish about it [his preferred team]".

== See also ==
- Pakistan Super League
- Karachi Kings–Hyderabad Kingsmen rivalry
- Islamabad United–Rawalpindiz rivalry
- India–Pakistan cricket rivalry
- Chennai Super Kings–Mumbai Indians rivalry
