= 2020 Pakistan Super League players draft =

PSL player drafts

The player draft for the 2020 Pakistan Super League took place at National Cricket Academy, Lahore on 6 December 2019. The first round took place on 3 November 2019 to determine the pick order. As this season was scheduled to be held entirely in Pakistan, only the players who were comfortable with playing in Pakistan were included in this draft.

== Background ==
The Pakistan Cricket Board (PCB) announced that the team to have the first pick of the draft will be decided by a street cricket game called Pugam on 3 November 2019. It was held at the Gaddafi Stadium in Lahore. The rest of the draft was decided by a super computer.

== Transfer ==
On 30 November 2019, it was announced that Usman Shinwari was transferred from Kings to Qalandars.

== Retained players ==
On 1 December 2019, PSL announced the retention players list with all six teams retaining a total of 45 players from previous season.

Class	Islamabad United	Karachi Kings	Lahore Qalandars	Multan Sultans	Peshawar Zalmi	Quetta Gladiators
Platinum	Shadab Khan	Babar Azam; Mohammad Amir	Fakhar Zaman; Mohammed Hafeez	Mohammad Irfan	Wahab Riaz; Hasan Ali; Kieron Pollard	Sarfaraz Ahmed; Mohammad Nawaz
Diamond	Faheem Ashraf; Asif Ali	Imad Wasim; Iftikhar Ahmed	David Wiese; Shaheen Afridi; Usman Shinwari	Shahid Afridi	Kamran Akmal	Shane Watson; Ahmed Shehzad
Gold	Luke Ronchi; Hussain Talat	Aamer Yamin	Sohail Akhtar; Haris Rauf	James Vince; Junaid Khan	Darren Sammy; Imam-ul-Haq	Umar Akmal; Mohammad Hasnain
Silver	Ammad Butt; Rizwan Hussain; Muhammad Musa	Usama Mir	Salman Butt	Shan Masood; Ali Shafiq	Umar Amin	Naseem Shah; Ahsan Ali
Emerging		Umer Khan		Mohammad Ilyas		

== Draft picks ==
The draft took place on 6 December 2019 at the National Cricket Academy in Lahore. A total of 425 foreign players from 22 countries were registered for the draft. Quetta Gladiators, the defending champions, got the first pick in the opening round of the 2020 PSL draft, followed by Lahore Qalandars. The order for the other four teams was: Multan Sultans (third), Islamabad United (fourth), Peshawar Zalmi (fifth) and Karachi Kings (last).

Class	Islamabad United	Karachi Kings	Lahore Qalandars	Multan Sultans	Peshawar Zalmi	Quetta Gladiators
Platinum	Dale Steyn; Colin Ingram	Alex Hales	Chris Lynn	Moeen Ali; Rilee Rossouw		Jason Roy
Diamond	Colin Munro	Chris Jordan		Zeeshan Ashraf; Ravi Bopara	Tom Banton; Shoaib Malik	Ben Cutting
Gold	Rumman Raees	Sharjeel Khan; Cameron Delport	Samit Patel	Sohail Tanvir	Liam Dawson	Fawad Ahmed
Silver	Phil Salt; Zafar Gohar	Mohammad Rizwan; Umaid Asif; Dan Lawrence; Ali Khan	Sekkuge Prasanna; Ben Dunk; Raja Farzan; Jahid Ali	Khushdil Shah; Usman Qadir; Fabian Allen	Mohammad Mohsin; Rahat Ali; Dwaine Pretorius; Adil Amin	Sohail Khan; Tymal Mills; Abdul Nasir
Emerging	Akif Javed; Ahmed Safi Abdullah	Arshad Iqbal	Muhammad Faizan; Maaz Khan	Rohail Nazir	Mohammad Amir Khan; Aamir Ali	Aarish Khan; Azam Khan
Supplementary	Saif Badar; Rassie van der Dussen	Liam Plunkett; Awais Zia	Lendl Simmons; Dilbar Hussain	Imran Tahir; Bilawal Bhatti	Liam Livingstone; Haider Ali Khan	Keemo Paul; Khurram Manzoor

== Replacements ==
Following players were replaced in PSL replacement draft.

Player	Team	Replaced with	Notes
Rassie van der Dussen (gold, supplementary)	Islamabad United	Dawid Malan (silver)	Unavailable for full competition due to national duties
Dwaine Pretorius (silver)	Peshawar Zalmi	Lewis Gregory (silver)	Unavailable for full competition due to national duties
Dan Lawrence (silver)	Karachi Kings	Chadwick Walton (silver)	Unavailable for full competition due to national duties
Kieron Pollard (platinum)	Peshawar Zalmi	Carlos Brathwaite (diamond)	Unavailable for full competition due to national duties
Fabian Allen (silver)	Multan Sultans	Wayne Madsen (silver)	Unavailable partially due to national duties
Keemo Paul (silver, supplementary)	Quetta Gladiators	Zahid Mahmood (silver)	Unavailable partially due to national duties
Liam Plunkett (gold, supplementary)	Karachi Kings	Mitchell McClenaghan (gold)	Ruled out due to an injury
Lendl Simmons (diamond, supplementary)	Lahore Qalandars	Dane Vilas (gold)	Unavailable for personal reasons

A day before the tournament, Anwar Ali replaced Umar Akmal in Gladiators squad, who became unavailable after he was suspended by PCB with immediate effect under Article 4.7.1 of its anti-corruption code, disallowing him from taking part in any cricket-related activity under the board's purview, "pending the investigation being carried out by PCB's Anti-Corruption Unit". Akmal faced no sanction, only a reminder of his responsibilities, with a PCB statement saying that he had "offered his regrets" to the PCB for his action, and was in turn reprimanded and "reminded him of his responsibilities as a senior cricketer". A week into the tournament Lahore Qalandars' Haris Rauf suffered a foot injury and was replaced by Salman Irshad for 2-3 matches. Meanwhile, Mohammad Mohsin from Peshawar Zalmi also got injured and was unavailable for at least a week and was replaced by Yasir Shah.

Kieron Pollard who was expected to join the Peshawar Zalmi squad after the conclusion of West Indies tour of Sri Lanka, suffered a niggle in his right thigh and was replaced by Carlos Brathwaite for the whole season, who was earlier named as his temporary replacement. On 8 March in the match against Lahore Qalandars, Aamer Yamin suffered a hamstring injury while bowling and was replaced by Waqas Maqsood in the Kings squad for the remaining season.

Ahead of the play-offs, teams included new players in their squad as Faf du Plessis, Khurram Shehzad and Hardus Viljoen replaced Kieron Pollard, Mohammad Amir Khan and Liam Dawson in Peshawar Zalmi squad. In Multan Sultans squad Mahmudullah and Adam Lyth replaced Moeen Ali and Fabian Allen respectively. Lahore Qalandars replaced Chris Lynn, Salman Butt and Seekkuge Prasanna with Tamim Iqbal, Abid Ali and Agha Salman respectively. While, Karachi Kings replaced Chris Jordan and Ali Khan with Sherfane Rutherford and Waqas Maqsood.
