= Behind closed doors (sport) =

Sporting events played without spectators

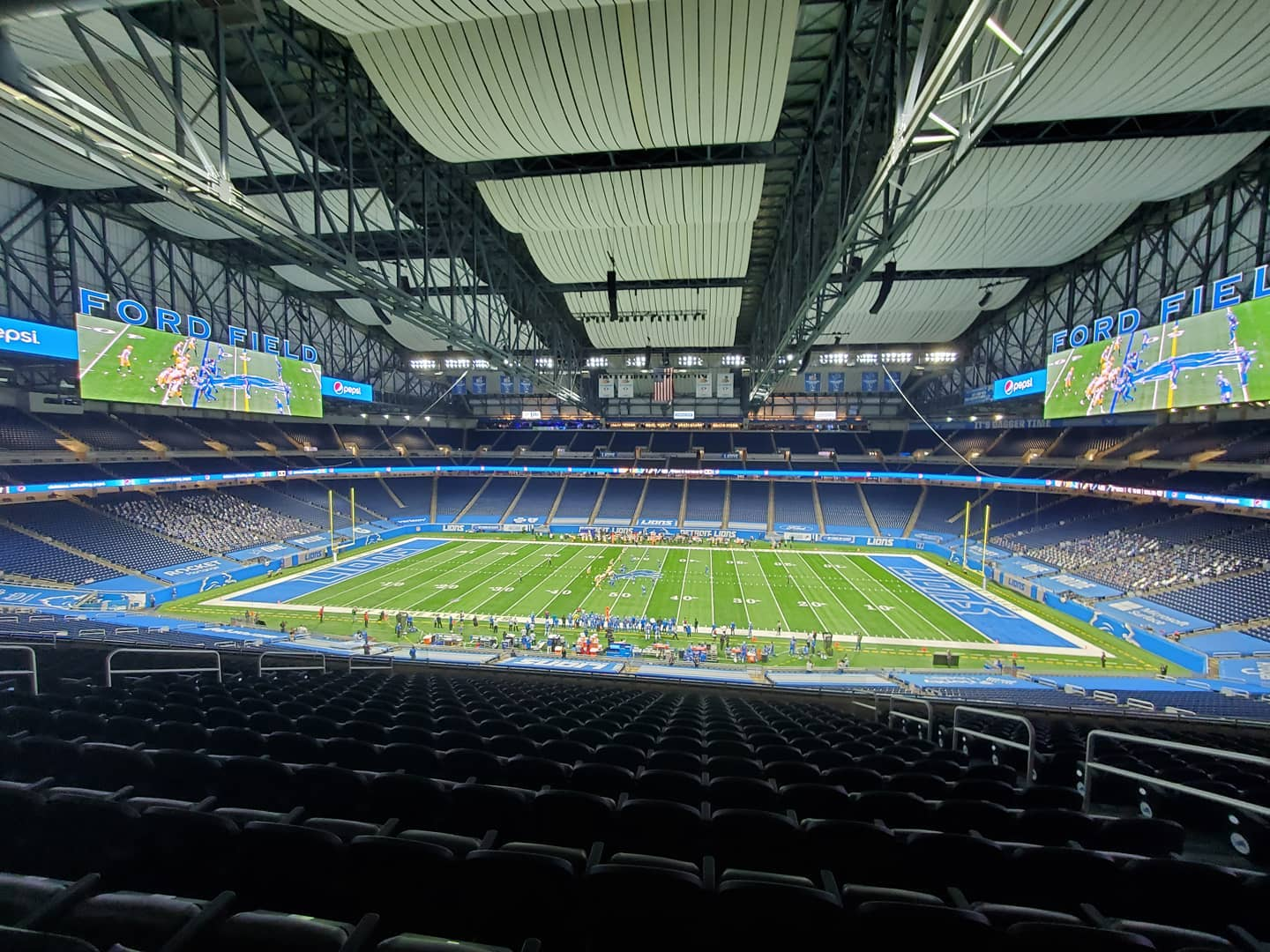
Empty Ford Field in Detroit, Michigan, US, with only cardboard fans attending an NFL game amid the COVID-19 pandemic (2020)

The term "behind closed doors" is used in several sports to describe matches played where spectators are not allowed in the stadium or venue to watch. A match played in this manner is also referred to as a crowdless game. Because ticket sales generally constitute a substantial proportion of total revenues in most professional sports as well as in certain elite competitions of many amateur sports, it is rare for such games to be off limits to paying members of the general public. When such instances do occur, it is usually for reasons outside the participating teams' control. These may include as a punishment or remedy for a participating team, stadium safety problems, preventing potentially dangerous clashes between rival supporters, wider safety concerns like a riot or other civil disturbances, or public health concerns like the COVID-19 pandemic.

== Examples ==
=== Brazil ===
In Brazil, the practice of games without public access is known as "closed gates" (in Portuguese, portões fechados), even referred as such in the Brazilian Football Confederation's rulebook. Once it was applied to a whole tournament: two rounds of the Campeonato Catarinense second division in 2014 were behind closed doors because the competing clubs did not deliver the security checks for their stadiums. Sanitary reasons dictated the restriction in 2009, when two games of the Série D were played behind closed doors due to the H1N1 flu pandemic.

=== North America ===
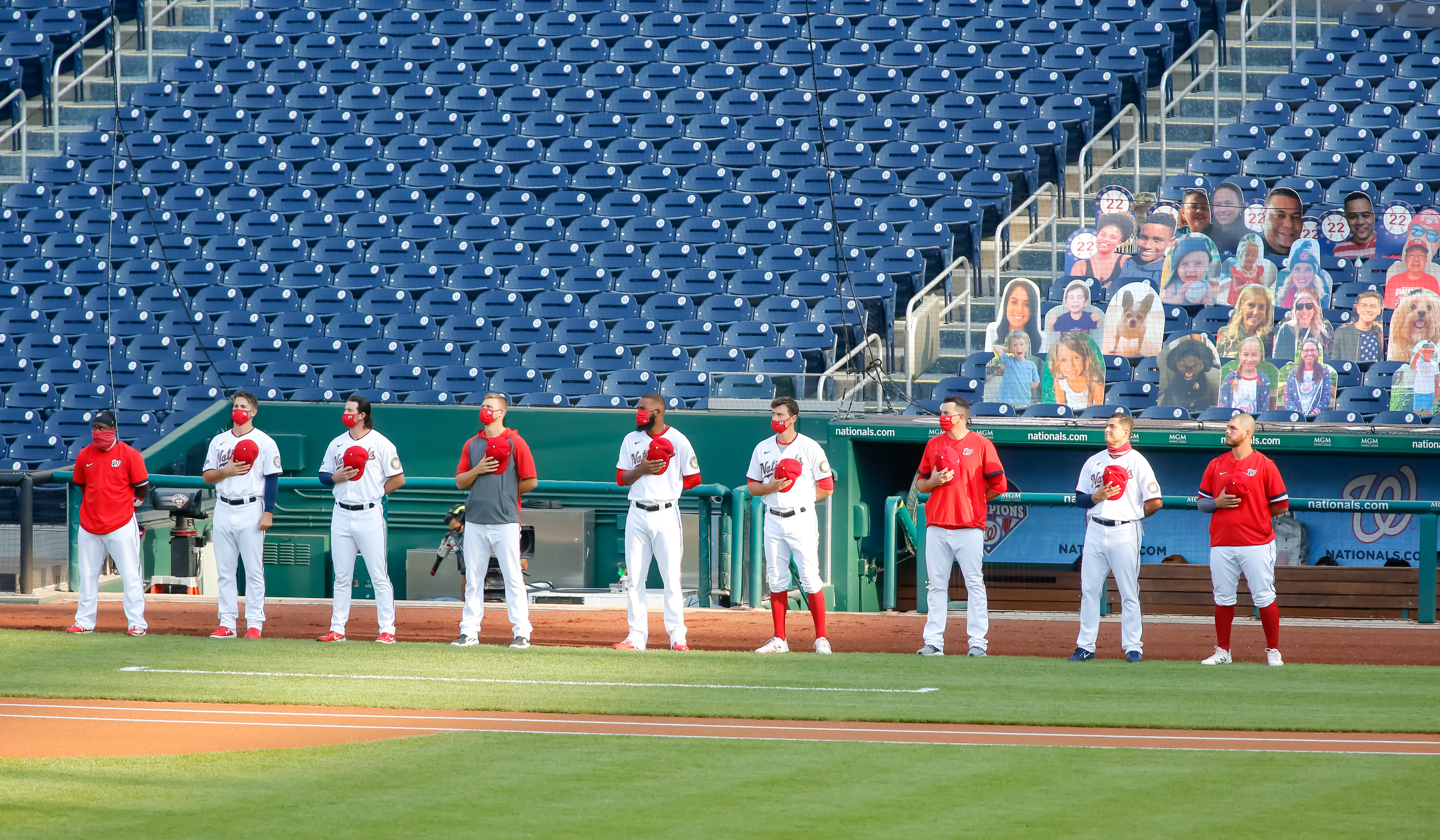
Washington Nationals players during the national anthem in front of cardboard fans, 2020

The most prevalent example of North American teams playing without fans in attendance was as a consequence of public health measures related to the COVID-19 pandemic. Ultimately, these were determined by local health authorities which had the power to limit public gatherings. While the terms and duration of these measures varied by jurisdiction, as a general rule Canadian provincial measures were far more strict and kept in place considerably longer compared to those in U.S. states. Canadian authorities were also much less willing to grant exemptions for professional sports teams, with the exemptions granted being very limited in scope; in some cases, public health authorities threatened not to grant sufficient dispensation to allow a sufficient gathering to permit a game to be played at all. Notably, the Canadian Football League, which is more dependent on gate receipts compared to the "big four" major professional sports leagues, refused to play under these restrictions, and instead, canceled its 2020 season.

A related issue affecting the leagues was travel restrictions, imposed at the federal, provincial and state levels, barring non-essential border crossings and/or mandating strict quarantines for border crossers, which would have restricted the availability of players if they frequently crossed the international border. The NHL, as the primarily U.S. based league with the most teams in Canada, responded to all this by finishing the 2019-20 NHL season behind closed doors in restricted access "bubbles" in Canada, and creating temporary divisions including the all-Canadian North Division for the 2020-21 NHL season.

The National Football League, which was in its offseason at the start of the pandemic, was the only league able to complete its season in 2020 with minimal disruption to the schedule. Over time, public health authorities began to allow crowds again, first in limited numbers. One of the consequences of this was that Super Bowl LV, the first to be held in the stadium of a participating team, was also the least-attended NFL championship game since 1941, which was played in wartime two weeks after the attack on Pearl Harbor. By the autumn of 2021, capacity crowds were generally allowed throughout the United States although some Canadian jurisdictions continued to limit attendance. By the spring of 2022, capacity limits were lifted in Canada as well.

Several leagues have collective bargaining agreements which mandate that the players as a group receive a defined percentage of league revenues. This meant the owners had the legal right to recoup a portion of any lost ticket revenues, as in these leagues a portion of salaries is paid into escrow pending a final determination of revenue. In some cases, such as the NHL, the owners and players agreed to modify their CBA to defer this "debt" over several years. In Major League Baseball, which does not have such defined revenue sharing, players agreed to receive pro-rated salaries over a reduced 60 game schedule for the 2020 Major League Baseball season.

Minor League Baseball and the Canadian Football League both cancelled their summer 2020 seasons rather than attempt to go crowdless (the CFL has substantial television revenue, but not enough to cover salaries and other gameday expenses, with no prospect of convincing provincial governments to allow crowds to attend games at this time this meant the league lost less money by not playing).

Hooliganism has been less of a factor in North American sports than the rest of the world. Local law enforcement in the United States and Canada are traditionally armed, unlike in some other countries. In addition, private security contractors working for either the team or a league, and national agencies such as the United States Department of Homeland Security take large roles in preventing situations of fan violence before they can occur by restricting access to known troublesome fans either at the gate or at the stage of selling tickets (such as "do not sell" lists), along with heavy restrictions on bringing in items and screening with metal detectors and pat-down searches where bringing in a weapon or explosive device can result in immediate arrest and permanent banishment from a venue, and other examples such as the "clear bag" policy, which only allows spectators to bring in bags that can be easily seen through.

Teams also have incentive to prevent fan violence due to forfeit rules which come with penalties to their records and playoff positioning, and league sanctions such as fines and the stripping of draft picks due to neglecting to create a safe environment for players, which in turn can affect teams for years beyond a violent event. Also sporting events in North America are considered to be more of a family-friendly and uniting affair, as sports fans tend to respect each other as fans of a common sport. In other countries around the world, sports matches are sometimes proxies for bitter and long-standing ethnic, political, and religious divisions; this is less so in the United States, where the broad variety of sports options manifests as different ethnic groups preferring different sports, reducing the chance at intercultural rivalry within a single sport. Also, having political, religious, or ethnic overtones in a sports match is considered taboo in the United States. While racial segregation in the United States once extended to organized sports, the primary intent was to exclude blacks from playing on white teams and leagues altogether, so the result was often the organization of separate teams and leagues for black players, whom the white teams simply refused to play. When the "color lines" of each sport were finally broken, it was by formerly all-white teams signing black athletes instead of by admitting entire black teams, although numerous incidents of racist abuse by players and spectators did occur in the decades following integration.

Furthermore, the much larger geographical footprint of the North American sports leagues mean that even fierce rivals are often based hundreds or even thousands of miles apart. For example, while the Dallas Cowboys are considered to be the bitter rivals of every other team in the NFC East, their nearest division rival is based almost 1,100 miles (1,800 km) from the Dallas metropolitan area by air, and over 1,300 miles (2,100 km) from Dallas by road. The only other NFL team in Texas by contrast is in the opposite conference, so, meaning under normal circumstances they will only play each other every four years. Fans elsewhere in the world can easily travel to most if not all of their league's stadiums by road or train, and bus and rail carriers have evolved there to cater to the expected demand. In contrast, fans of the North American sports leagues would need to travel by air if they wanted to attend most of their team's road games, though certain teams' fan bases are known for having large presences in opposing stadiums. In contrast to the local derbies of European soccer, some North American teams in the same metropolitan areas, especially in baseball and (gridiron) football, are separated into opposite conferences or leagues so that they are among the least frequent opponents on their schedules, inhibiting the development of a crosstown rivalry and allowing fans in a metropolitan area to support both teams with minimal conflict. Furthermore, unlike in most geographically smaller and more densely populated countries, teams are typically not required to (and typically do not) set aside whole sections of their stadiums for opposing fans, and instead, sell almost all tickets to the first takers, further disincentivizing them from traveling to away games.

All of these reduce the chances of hooliganism, eliminate the need to segregate fans from opposing teams, and ultimately negate the threat of a closed-door game due as a consequence of fan violence. In rare circumstances where a serious incident has occurred (such the 2004 Pacers–Pistons brawl in the NBA), sports authorities have leaned toward identifying and excluding the specific people involved as opposed to indiscriminately punishing the wider, law-abiding fan base. In contrast to the rest of the world where "behind closed doors" games are given out as penalties for previous violations, or to prevent potential violence (stadium safety issues, checkered history of rival supporters), such occurrences in North America have happened for entirely different reasons.

== History ==
=== World Chess Championship 1972 ===
Perhaps one of the first and most famous incidents of a sport being carried out behind closed doors was Game 3 of the World Chess Championship 1972 in Reykjavík, Iceland, often referred to as the Match of the Century. Eventual winner Bobby Fischer, who was upset by the noise of film cameras, insisted he would not play unless it was behind closed doors. Sportingly, his opponent, Boris Spassky, obliged Fischer's request rather than claim a win by forfeit.

=== 1980–81 European Cup Winners' Cup ===
After rioting by fans in the first leg against Castilla in Spain, West Ham United were forced to play the second leg at Upton Park in October 1980 to an empty stadium.

=== 1982–83 European Cup ===
After rioting by fans in a semifinal at Anderlecht in Belgium the previous April, Aston Villa were forced to begin their defence of the European Cup at an empty Villa Park in a September 1982 first round match, with the match kicking off at 2:30 pm on a Wednesday afternoon.

=== 1987–88 European Cup ===
After UEFA ban resulting from the incidents in the match between Real Madrid and Bayern Munich in a semifinal in Spain the previous April, Real Madrid were forced to play the match at home against Napoli in the European Cup at an empty Santiago Bernabeu Stadium on 16 September 1987.

=== 2002 Charleston RiverDogs ===
In 2002, the Charleston RiverDogs of Minor League Baseball voluntarily played part of a game with no fans in attendance. As a promotion, the team held "Nobody Night" in order to set the all-time record for lowest attendance at a baseball game. Fans were kept out of the stadium but were invited to a party outside and could see the game by looking over the fence or through openings in the fence. Once the attendance became official in the fifth inning, fans were allowed inside to see the rest of the game.

=== 2007 Italian football ===
As a result of a policeman being killed during rioting at a Serie A match between Catania and Palermo on 2 February, the Italian Football Federation suspended all Italian matches indefinitely. Subsequently, matches resumed but many clubs were ordered to play their games behind closed doors until their stadiums met with updated security regulations.

=== 2009 Italian football ===
Juventus were ordered to play a home game behind closed doors after their fans had racially abused Internazionale striker Mario Balotelli during a 1–1 Serie A draw in April 2009.

=== 2009 Davis Cup match in Sweden ===
In March 2009, Sweden's Davis Cup tennis team was slated to host a qualifying match against Israel's team in the city of Malmö. The local authorities in Malmö, particularly the city's then-Mayor, did not want an Israeli team to play there and pushed to cancel the match. When the Swedish Tennis Association noted that a cancellation would result in Sweden suffering a forfeit loss and being eliminated from the Davis Cup altogether, it was agreed that the Sweden-Israel match would be played without spectators on "security grounds". Rioting outside the arena led to numerous arrests, and in the end Sweden lost to Israel and saw their 2009 Davis Cup run end anyway.

=== 2009–10 UEFA Europa League ===
FC Dinamo București had to play two group stage home games behind closed doors after their match against FC Slovan Liberec on 25 August 2009 was abandoned in the 88th minute due to a pitch invasion by Dinamo fans.

=== 2009 Mexico Clausura ===
During the penultimate round of league games all teams had to play with closed doors due to the H1N1 swine flu outbreak in infected cities. Several games taking place in areas which were badly affected by the outbreak were also played behind closed doors the following week. Games behind closed doors have been played regularly as a penalty for bad behavior of fans in Mexico, most recently an Apertura 2015 game in which Atlas hosted Querétaro at Estadio Jalisco because of last season quarterfinal game in which Atlas fans invaded the pitch against their hated rivals Guadalajara.

=== 2010–11 Heineken Cup ===
In rugby union, the 2010–11 Heineken Cup pool stage match between Edinburgh and Castres at Murrayfield was played behind closed doors on 20 December 2010. The match was originally scheduled for 19 December, but was postponed due to heavy snow in Edinburgh that covered the pitch and created major access issues for potential spectators. The competition organiser, European Rugby Cup, decided to hold the rescheduled match behind closed doors to remove any possible danger to spectators attempting to travel to the match.

=== Turkish football in 2011–12 ===
Starting with the 2011–12 season, the Turkish Football Federation (TFF) instituted a modified version of this rule. The penalty for a team sanctioned for crowd violence is now a ban on both ticket sales to, and attendance by, males over age 12 (as spectators). Women, and children under age 12 of either sex, are admitted free. The first game under the new rule took place on 20 September 2011, when Fenerbahçe hosted Manisaspor at Şükrü Saracoğlu Stadium in Istanbul. Over 41,000 women and children attended the match (plus a small number of men who had sneaked into the stadium). The experiment was so successful that the TFF planned to require that teams allocate an unspecified number of free tickets for women and children at all future club matches. Shortly thereafter, the TFF stated that it would reimburse clubs for free tickets given to women and children for regular league games (i.e., games not subject to crowd restrictions), and increased the upper age limit for "children" for the purposes of free ticketing to 15.

=== Ajax–AZ, 2011–12 KNVB Cup ===
A match between Eredivisie clubs Ajax and AZ in the fourth round of the 2011–12 KNVB Cup was replayed behind closed doors at Ajax's home ground, Amsterdam Arena, on 19 January 2012.

In the original match, held at the same venue on 21 December 2011, Ajax held a 1–0 lead when a fan ran onto the pitch and launched a karate kick from behind against AZ goalkeeper Esteban Alvarado, who responded by attacking the fan before police and security arrived. When Alvarado was sent off for retaliating against his attacker, AZ left the pitch, and the match was abandoned. The KNVB rescinded the red card and ordered the match replayed in its entirety.

After Ajax also apologised to their opponents, they were fined €10,000 for failing to provide adequate security to prevent the fan, who was serving a three-year stadium ban, from entering the arena. Ajax accepted the penalties, and announced that it had extended the fan's stadium ban by 30 years and banned him for life from the club and its season ticket list.

=== 2014 Urawa Red Diamonds ===
On 8 March 2014, the Urawa Red Diamonds were forced by the J.League to play their next game against Shimizu S-Pulse in front of only journalists and security, a first in J.League history, as Reds fans had hung up a banner over the entrance to Saitama Stadium which read "JAPANESE ONLY", which was deemed racist.

=== Barcelona–Las Palmas, 2017–18 La Liga ===
Surrounding violence in Catalonia due to the 2017 Catalan independence referendum, the match between Barcelona and Las Palmas in the 2017–18 La Liga was played behind closed doors. Barcelona first requested the LFP to postpone their match which was to be played on the same day as the referendum. This request was declined by the LFP, saying that, if Barcelona refused to play the match, their six points would be deducted. To protect the fans, as well as in protest to LFP's decision, Barcelona played the match behind closed doors, a first at their stadium, Camp Nou. The match ended 3–0 in favor of Barcelona.

=== Belarus involvement in the Russian invasion of Ukraine ===
UEFA announced on 3 March 2022 that, as a result of Belarusian involvement in the Russian invasion of Ukraine, home matches for Belarus and UEFA club competition matches that would be hosted by Belarusian teams were required to be held at neutral venues and behind closed doors until further notice.

=== Philippines–Qatar, 2019 FIBA Basketball World Cup Asian qualifiers ===
As part of the sanctions handed to the Philippine men's basketball team in the aftermath of their involvement in their brawl against Australia during their home game on 2 July 2018, the Philippine national team was obliged to play their next home match in the second round of the 2019 FIBA Basketball World Cup Asian qualifiers behind closed doors with the succeeding two home games being placed under probation. The lone game that was played behind closed doors was their home game against Qatar on 17 September 2018 at the Smart Araneta Coliseum.

=== Querétaro–Atlas riot ===
On 5 March 2022, a riot broke out among fans during a Liga MX football game between Querétaro F.C. and Atlas F.C., injuring at least 26 people.

In the aftermath of the riots, Querétaro was ordered to play its home matches behind closed doors for up to a year, while also banning its supporters' group for three years, and the club's owners being required to divest the club, and be prohibited from league activities for five years. Liga MX's second-tier league, Liga de Expansión MX, ordered all matches league-wide to be played behind closed doors from 8–13 March 2022.

=== Major League Baseball ===
On 28 April 2015, a Major League Baseball (MLB) game between the Chicago White Sox and Baltimore Orioles was played behind closed doors due to security concerns. The death of Freddie Gray, an African-American resident, while in police custody had led to riots and civil unrest in Baltimore. The game was to have been the last game of a three-game series, but the first two had already been postponed due to the unrest. The game was also moved from the evening to the afternoon, as a 10 p.m. curfew would have required suspension of the game had it been played at its original time. The game was televised in the Baltimore and Chicago markets, and was also offered as the "free game of the day" on MLB's streaming service nationwide. Unofficially, some fans were able to watch the game through obstructed gates in left-center field, along with guests at the nearby Hilton Baltimore, which overlooks Oriole Park at Camden Yards. MLB refused to acknowledge or record the attendance as zero, so as not to disturb the otherwise unbreakable record of 6 paying spectators who witnessed the Worcester National League team's penultimate game in 1882; instead, MLB recorded the attendance (as well as all of the later COVID-related crowdless games of 2020) as "N/A".

This was the first time a major professional sporting event in North America was held in an empty venue; in Minor League Baseball, a 2008 Iowa Cubs game was played without public admittance due to flooding in Des Moines, Iowa, while a 2002 Charleston RiverDogs game featured an intentional "Nobody Night" stunt, where spectators could not take their seat in the stands (but were still allowed to be in other areas of the ballpark) until after the attendance count was made official in the fifth inning. Approximately 1,800 spectators were in attendance.

=== PGA Tour Golf ===
While large galleries consisting of thousands of fans are standard for top-level professional golf events in the United States, on 30 June 2012, the third round of the 2012 AT&T National at Congressional Country Club in Bethesda, Maryland, was played without fans being admitted due to trees being downed and other storm damage caused by a derecho the night before. Additionally, the start of the third round was delayed to the early afternoon, instead of a morning start that is normal for a round of a golf tournament utilizing a stroke play format, in order to allow for the continuation of course clean-up efforts. This is the first of two recorded instances of any part of a PGA Tour event being played without a gallery present.

In the 2016 Farmers Insurance Open at Torrey Pines Golf Course in the La Jolla community of San Diego, California, after inclement weather disrupted play on Sunday and several trees were ripped apart on the golf course, fans were barred from the premises for the Monday conclusion of the final round of the tournament due to safety issues. The 2018 edition of the same tournament also was finished behind closed doors on Monday. The sudden death playoff had reached five holes without a winner, and darkness made it impossible to complete the tournament. The event concluded Monday morning at 8:18 a.m. behind closed doors.

=== Ice hockey ===
The Charlotte Checkers of the American Hockey League have played in two such "behind closed doors" games, both caused by severe winter storms when the opposing team and game officials had already arrived in the city. On 22 January 2016, the Checkers played against the Chicago Wolves behind closed doors because of a severe winter storm, and the same again on 17 January 2018, the Checkers played against the Bridgeport Sound Tigers behind closed doors as a result of inclement weather (ice and snow). Both games were played at Bojangles' Coliseum.

In 1985, a measles outbreak on campus led Boston University to hold home ice hockey games without spectators for a week, in order to control the disease's spread. Basketball games were also affected, and other large public events on campus were also temporarily banned.

=== Hurricane Helene ===
In late September 2024, Hurricane Helene caused extensive damage to Appalachia and the Southeastern United States. This damage displaced many teams and caused others, like the Western Carolina Catamounts football team, to move games behind closed doors.

=== Davis Cup ===
In September 2025, a 2025 Davis Cup World Group I tie between Canada and Israel at the Scotiabank Centre in Halifax was played behind closed doors at the request of Tennis Canada, due to security concerns surrounding Gaza war protests that were scheduled to coincide with the matches.

== COVID-19 pandemic ==
Games without crowds were often the norm during the COVID-19 pandemic, especially in the period before COVID-19 vaccinations were widely available, due to government-imposed restrictions on large gatherings to prevent spread of COVID-19. Many events that were not postponed or cancelled were held behind closed doors as broadcast-only events.

=== Sports ===
==== Association football ====
- The 2020 Indian Super League final between ATK and Chennaiyin FC was forced to play behind closed doors on Saturday, 14 March 2020 In Fatorda Stadium, Margao, Goa, India
- The UEFA Europa League match between Inter Milan and Ludogorets Razgrad in San Siro Stadium, Milan, Italy, as well as all football matches in Italy between 4 March and 3 April.
- The 2020 AFC Cup match between Ceres–Negros and Bali United at the Rizal Memorial Stadium in Manila, Philippines.
- The final of the English FA Cup was held behind closed doors at Wembley Stadium in London, and played between Arsenal and Chelsea. The traditional pre-match performances of the National Anthem and cup hymn still took place.
- Major League Soccer returned after the 2020 Major League Soccer season was suspended, playing the MLS is Back Tournament behind closed doors at ESPN Wide World of Sports Complex in Florida.
- The UEFA Europa League matches between Olympiacos and Wolverhampton Wanderers, and LASK and Manchester United.
- The UEFA Champions League matches between Valencia and Atalanta, and Paris Saint-Germain and Borussia Dortmund. Despite the ban on fans inside the stadium, thousands gathered outside to cheer PSG as they beat Borussia Dortmund.
- Germany's Bundesliga announced plans to resume its 2019–20 season without spectators. On 6 May 2020, German Chancellor, Angela Merkel, gave approval for the Bundesliga, suspended since March 2020, to recommence in May 2020 with all remaining games to be played behind closed doors.
- South Korea's K League began its 2020 season on 8 May and Japan's J.League planned a mid-June return.

==== Athletics ====
- The 2020 Tokyo Marathon was held with only elite competitors allowed to attend.
- Similarly, the London Marathon (originally scheduled for 26 April, but was postponed to 4 October) was also held only to attend elite competitors.

==== Australian rules football ====
- The 2020 AFL season played its first round of matches without spectators before suspending the season. This continued into the 2021 season, with many games late in the season played under heavily restricted crowds or no crowds at all, especially late in the home-and-away season after a new outbreak in Victoria.

==== Baseball ====
- Japan's NPB held preseason games without fans until the season was postponed prior to opening day. The league planned to return without fans by mid-June 2020.
- South Korea's KBO League began their 2020 season on 5 May without fans in attendance.
- Taiwan's CPB League began play on 11 April without fans. Starting 8 May, a maximum of 1,000 fans were permitted to attend games.
- Major League Baseball in the United States began its shortened 2020 season on 23 July and held without spectators. However, fans were allowed to attend the NLCS and World Series in Arlington, Texas. The Toronto Blue Jays, MLB's only Canadian team, were denied permission by the Canadian government to play their games in Toronto; their games were played in Buffalo, New York at Sahlen Field, the home of one of the Blue Jays' minor league affiliates.

==== Basketball ====
- The 2020 NCAA Division I men's basketball tournament and other associated tournaments were planned to be held without fan attendance. Additionally, the Big Ten Conference announced that all spring sports played by member schools would be held without fans. This executive order also resulted in the NCAA choosing to restrict attendance of this and women's basketball tournaments to the participants' families, outside of areas where public attendance has been fully restricted. Both tournaments themselves would suffer their first cancellation in the 81-year history, along with all other championships in winter and spring sports.
- On 11 March 2020, the National Basketball Association announced that a game between the Brooklyn Nets and the Golden State Warriors to be played at Chase Center in San Francisco during the regular matches of the 2019–20 season on the following day would start at its normal time of 10:30 p.m. EDT, with no fans being admitted. This measure was taken due to concerns about the spread of COVID-19 in the Bay Area, which prompted most cities in the metropolitan area (including San Francisco) to issue a ban on public gatherings with 1,000 people or higher. The restrictions were made moot with the league suspending the season a few hours later after Rudy Gobert tested positive for COVID-19. From 30 July until 11 October 2020, the games resumed at ESPN Wide World of Sports Complex inside Walt Disney World near Orlando, Florida for the remainder of the season.
- The 2020 PBA season is the 45th season of the Philippine Basketball Association. Just three days after the opening ceremony, the season was suspended on 11 March, due to the COVID-19 pandemic and the enforcement of the enhanced community quarantine in Luzon. On 17 September, the PBA Board of Governors have approved a plan to restart the season on 11 October (originally on 9 October). The Inter-Agency Task Force for the Management of Emerging Infectious Diseases (IATF-ID) gave a provisional approval on 24 September. All games will be played in the "PBA bubble" inside the Clark Freeport Zone in Pampanga.
- The Toronto Raptors returned to playing all games behind closed doors effective 31 December 2021, after Ontario restricted indoor venues to a maximum of 1,000 spectators.

==== Combat sports ====
===== Mixed martial arts =====
- ONE Championship's King of the Jungle in Singapore.
- In the majority of 2020, Ultimate Fighting Championship events were held behind closed doors, such as UFC Fight Night 170 taking place in Brasília; subsequent events were cancelled and resumed on 9 May at UFC 249 in Jacksonville, Florida, United States and later events held at UFC Apex in Enterprise, Nevada near Las Vegas.

===== Professional wrestling =====
WWE moved all of its professional wrestling programs to a studio at its training facility in Orlando between 11 March 2020, and August 2020 with no audience, including its flagship event WrestleMania 36 (originally scheduled to be held at Tampa, Florida's Raymond James Stadium on 5 April). In August, the promotion debuted an arena setup called the WWE ThunderDome to allow fans to virtually attend events; a similar setup for their NXT brand dubbed the Capitol Wrestling Center debuted in October, though with a small crowd of select live fans allowed. Rival promotion All Elite Wrestling similarly moved its weekly programs to a closed set, beginning 18 March at Daily's Place in Jacksonville, Florida (and a brief stint in April at a training warehouse in Georgia before returning to Daily's Place); the promotion began to a readmit a limited number of ticketed fans (10–15% capacity of venue) in late August 2020. Other promotions similarly began holding shows behind closed doors.

===== Sumo =====
The Haru basho in Osaka, Japan. When the tournament went underway several wrestlers, used to fighting in a usually packed arenas, remark on how odd it is to fight in a virtually empty arena, with Enhō commenting, "It's like I can't raise my fighting spirit...It made me wonder what I'm fighting for."

==== Cricket ====
- Three of the 2020 Pakistan Super League matches in Karachi and one fixture in Lahore wereheld without an audience. The Final match in Lahore, was also rescheduled from 22 to 18 March. The matches in National Stadium, Karachi were announced to take place without an audience from 13 March. International players were also allowed to leave the tournament.
- In Australia, a cricket match between New Zealand Black Caps and Australia's team was held without an audience on 13 March.
- In July 2020, the Wisden Trophy between England and West Indies was held, in which a series of 3 test matches was played between them.
- In August and September 2020, Pakistan toured England to play a series of 3 test matches and 3 Twenty20 International matches, in "bio-secure" conditions behind closed doors.
- In September 2020, Australia toured England to play a series of 3 ODI matches and 3 Twenty20 International matches, in "bio-secure" conditions behind closed doors.
- The 2020 Indian Premier League was played behind closed doors, and also moved to sites in the United Arab Emirates. The 2021 Indian Premier League was held under similar restrictions in India, but was later suspended and once again resumed at sites in the UAE in September, with spectators allowed at a limited capacity.

==== Gaelic games ====
Unlike other sports such as association football, the concept of "behind closed doors" as a form of punishment does not exist in Gaelic games such as football and hurling. It first emerged in the sports due to the impact of the COVID-19 pandemic.

The Gaelic Athletic Association (GAA) first thought about playing games behind closed doors in March 2020 but decided against it at that time. The following month it had still not been given serious thought by the organisation. Opponents at this time included players such as Killian Young and managers such as Pete McGrath. On the night of 18 August 2020, the Government imposed new restrictions as the pandemic worsened, and games (which had just resumed) were forced behind closed doors as a result.

The later rounds of the 2020 National Football League and 2020 National Hurling League and the entirety of the 2020 All-Ireland Senior Football Championship and 2020 All-Ireland Senior Hurling Championship were played at grounds where spectators were not admitted. The 2020 All-Ireland Senior Hurling Championship Final was the first All-Ireland final to be played behind closed doors, followed less than two weeks later by the 2020 All-Ireland Senior Football Championship Final. Early rounds of the 2021 National Football League and 2021 National Hurling League were also played without crowds.

==== Golf ====
On the second day of the 2020 Players Championship the event's organizers were originally going to have the event played without spectators, but they had to cancel the remainder of the event. This subsequently led the PGA Tour to suspend the event until 11 June. The Masters Tournament (the first men's major championship of 2020) was rescheduled from April to November, while the PGA Championship and U.S. Open was rescheduled to August and September, respectively from their usual May and June schedule, and the Open Championship was cancelled for the first time since 1945. The PGA Championship became the first men's major of the season and was held behind closed doors.

Likewise, the early LPGA season was merely affected by the pandemic as tournaments in Asia had cancelled early in response with the outbreak in China, as the LPGA Tour had to suspend until 30 July. With the ANA Inspiration tournament (the first women's major championship of 2020) being rescheduled from April to September, while the KPMG Women's PGA Championship and U.S. Women's Open also being rescheduled to October and December, respectively, with the Evian Championship (first rescheduled to 6–9 August after being postponed from the original July schedule) cancelled for the first time in its 26-year history. However, the AIG Women's Open became the first women's major of the season and was held behind closed doors, took place on the usual August schedule and went on as planned, as the only Open Championship of the year organised by The R&A.

==== Gridiron football ====
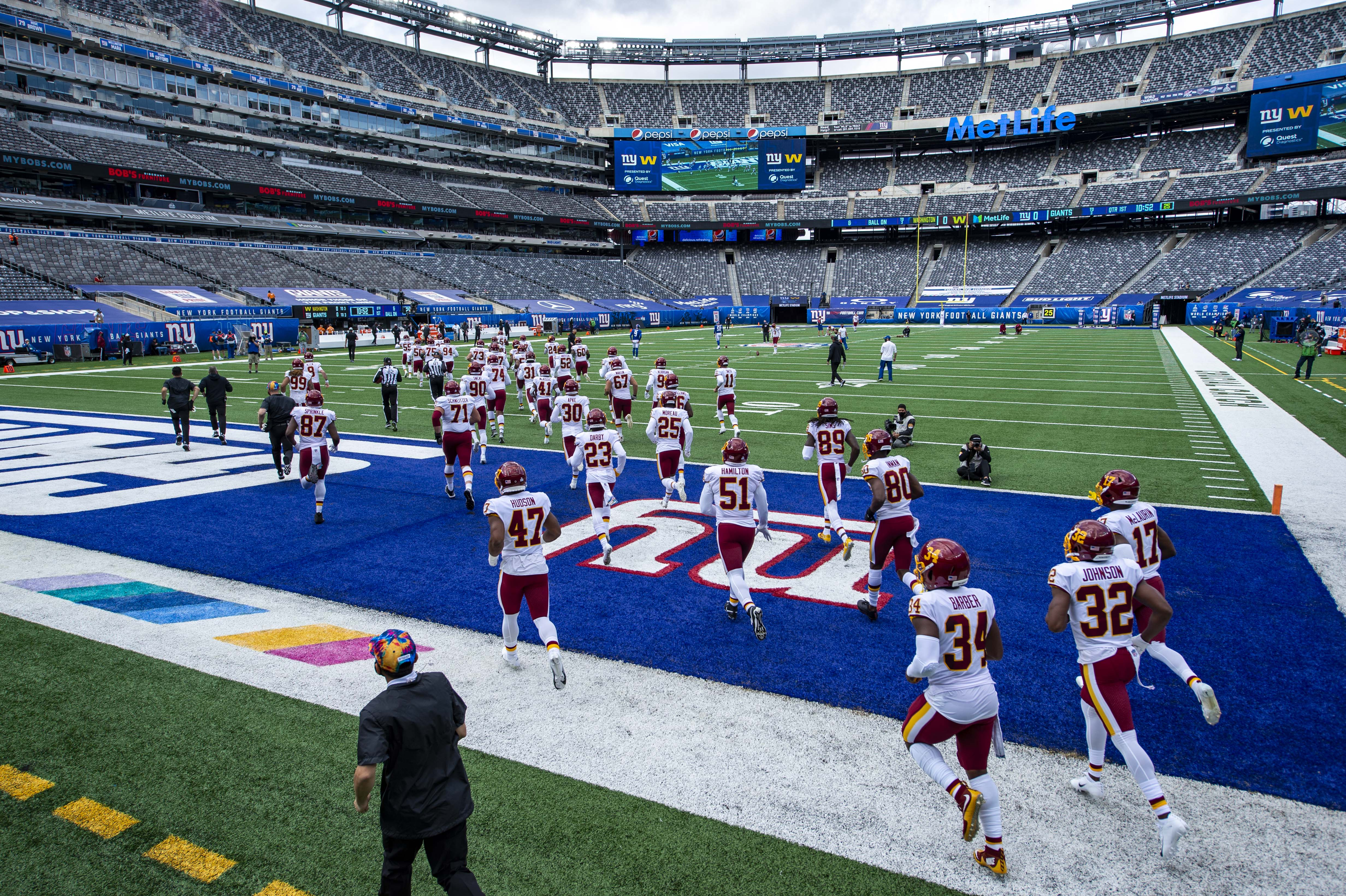
NFL game between the New York Giants and Washington Football Team at MetLife Stadium without fans in October 2020

A match between the Seattle Dragons and LA Wildcats of the XFL was scheduled to be played behind closed doors; the league's decision came shortly after Washington state governor Jay Inslee announced a ban on public assemblies of over 250 people. The game was ultimately never played as the pandemic forced the league to prematurely terminate its 2020 season.

During the 2020 NFL season, many games were played behind closed doors due to the COVID-19 pandemic. Some teams allowed a limited number of fans for some or all of their home games.

==== Horse racing ====
The British Horseracing Authority announced on 16 March that all horse racing in the UK would be held behind closed doors until the end of March. Similarly, the annual Triple Crown races in the United States, including the Kentucky Derby, Preakness Stakes and Belmont Stakes were all held behind closed doors. The Kentucky Derby and Preakness States were both moved from their usual May scheduling to September and October, respectively, with the Belmont Stakes being held on its usual June date.

==== Ice hockey ====
The Columbus Blue Jackets of the National Hockey League announced on March 11, 2020 that all of their remaining home games in the 2019–20 season at Nationwide Arena in Columbus, Ohio would be played behind closed doors due to an executive order by Ohio governor Mike DeWine that banned public gatherings with an attendance of 1,000 people or more. This would subsequently become moot the following day when the NHL suspended its season. Starting on August 1, the 2020 Stanley Cup playoffs commenced in the two bubble locations of Edmonton and Toronto with no fans present.

During the 2020–21 NHL season, three U.S.-based teams began the season admitting a limited number of spectators, but by the end of the regular season only the seven Canadian teams were playing crowdless games. While the 2021–22 NHL season began with all teams hosting spectators at full capacity, by December 2021 all Canadian NHL teams became subject to provincial public health orders to control the spread of Omicron variant, with Quebec prohibiting spectators at all sporting events, and the owners of the Toronto Maple Leafs and Winnipeg Jets both enacted a behind closed doors policy after Ontario and Manitoba restricted arena capacity to a maximum of 1,000 and 250 people respectively. As part of a wider array of games postponed due to players being placed under COVID-19 protocol due to positive tests, the NHL postponed almost all games hosted by Canadian teams (and in some cases, moved games to the home arena of their American opponent) for a period, specifically citing attendance restrictions as reasoning.

==== Motorsport ====
- In Formula One, the first scheduled Grand Prix of 2020 in Australia was cancelled, then the Bahrain Grand Prix (the second scheduled event of the Championship) which was expected to be media/TV-only event, was later postponed to 29 November 2020 and took place behind closed doors. The first few races of a rescheduled 2020 season, including two Grands Prix at Red Bull Ring (the Austrian and Styrian Grand Prix), the Hungarian and two Grands Prix at Silverstone, took place in "bio-secure" conditions behind closed doors.
- The first two 2020 NTT IndyCar Series meetings at the Indianapolis Motor Speedway (GMR Grand Prix and Indianapolis 500) were held without fans in attendance. Traditionally held in the month of May, the first race was moved to 4 July and the second race to 23 August to allow for the possibility of a limited number of fans, but both eventually became a behind closed doors event. The Texas Motor Speedway round to open the season had limited spectators in the Turn 2 Lone Star Towers, a policy from the circuit owner adopted from the previous NASCAR weekend, and all other races were held with limited spectators, including the third Indianapolis Motor Speedway weekend in October, part of the 2020 Indianapolis 8 Hours sports car weekend, with most natural terrain road courses closing grandstands and allowing spectators in self-sustaining camping vehicles to attend.
- NASCAR's Folds of Honor QuikTrip 500 and Dixie Vodka 400 races at Atlanta Motor Speedway and Homestead–Miami Speedway were not expected to admit fans; the events were later postponed. NASCAR resumed its season with The Real Heroes 400 at Darlington Raceway without fans in attendance. Throughout the remainder of the 2020 season, some tracks allowed a limited number of fans to attend races, the first of these tracks was Charlotte Motor Speedway, which allowed spectators in the Turn 1 residences on 24 May, and the first with spectators in grandstands being Talladega Superspeedway on 22 June, Bristol Motor Speedway on 15 July, and New Hampshire Motor Speedway on 2 August, while other tracks held races without fans in attendance. The NASCAR All-Star Race at Bristol Motor Speedway admitted 30,000 fans; while this was one of the largest sporting events with in-person attendance since the start of the pandemic in the U.S., Bristol Motor Speedway is one of the largest sporting venues in the world, with a total capacity of 162,000.
- The 2020 24 Hours of Le Mans marked the first time no fans were in attendance.

==== Multi-sport events ====
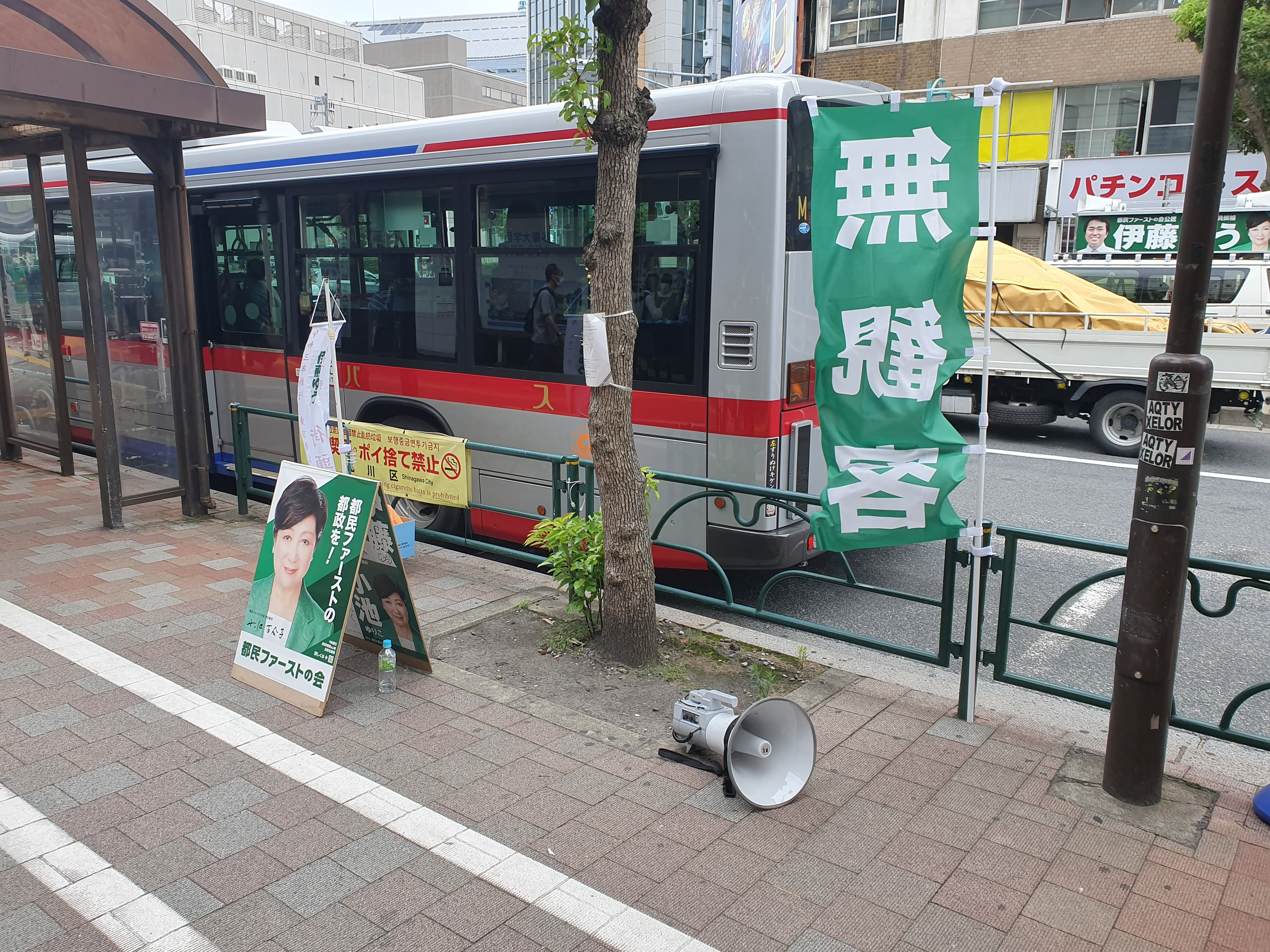
Signs placed by the Tokyo Tomin First no Kai political party calling for the 2020 Summer Olympics to be held behind closed doors

Initially, the 2020 Summer Olympics (postponed to 2021 due to the pandemic) were approved for a maximum of 10,000 spectators or 50% capacity (whichever is lower) per-venue. On 8 July 2021, it was announced that Tokyo and the three prefectures (Chiba, Kanagawa and Saitama) would be placed under a new state of emergency from 12 July through 22 August due to rising cases in the area, and that spectators would be prohibited at all Olympic venues in the city. Organizers had already prohibited spectators and supporters from outside of Japan from attending the Games due to concerns over international travel restrictions. Fukushima and Hokkaido later followed suit and would also prohibit spectators during the Games.

==== Tennis ====
The 2020 BNP Paribas Open in Indian Wells, California was postponed shortly before the beginning of the qualifying stage after a COVID-19 case was confirmed within Riverside County and the county's health department declared a public health emergency. Subsequently, both the Association of Tennis Professionals (ATP) and Women's Tennis Association (WTA) announced that their seasons would be suspended until at least 31 July, with the 2020 French Open being rescheduled to September and Wimbledon being cancelled for the first time since 1945. Furthermore, the US Open was played without spectators on the original late-August date as planned. Additionally, the 2020 ATP Finals held in London (the final year London hosted the finals) was played without spectators as planned.

=== Non-sporting events ===
- The 2020 Dansk Melodi Grand Prix in Copenhagen, Denmark (the national selection to the Eurovision Song Contest 2020, which was later canceled) was held with no audience being admitted.
- The 2020 Geneva International Motor Show was cancelled days before its opening day due to Switzerland's self-imposed limit on gatherings of over 1,000 people. The Car of the Year award was presented live behind closed doors. A few car manufacturers who stayed, including Koeniggsegg, unveiled their models pre-recorded at the show.
- The Miss Universe Philippines 2020 (a national pageant leading to Miss Universe 2020) was held with no audience present.

== See also ==
- Catania football riot
- Impact of the COVID-19 pandemic on sports
