= Chris Lynn =

Australian cricketer

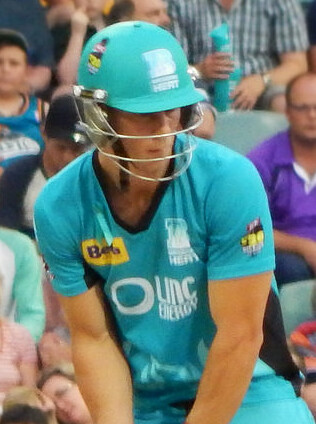
- Lynn with the Brisbane Heat in 2014

Personal information
- Full name: Christopher Austin Lynn
- Born: 10 April 1990 (age 36); Herston, Queensland,, Australia
- Height: 1.80 m (5 ft 11 in)
- Batting: Right-handed
- Bowling: Slow left-arm orthodox
- Role: Batter

International information
- National side: Australia (2014–2018)
- ODI debut (cap 217): 13 January 2017 v Pakistan
- Last ODI: 11 November 2018 v South Africa
- ODI shirt no.: 50
- T20I debut (cap 66): 29 January 2014 v England
- Last T20I: 25 November 2018 v India
- T20I shirt no.: 50

Domestic team information
- Years: Team
- 2009/10–2018/19: Queensland
- 2011/12–2021/22: Brisbane Heat
- For other teams see list

Career statistics
Competition	ODI	T20I	FC	T20
Matches	4	18	41	319
Runs scored	75	291	2,743	9,222
Batting average	18.75	19.40	43.53	33.17
100s/50s	0/0	0/0	6/12	8/59
Top score	44	44	250	117
Balls bowled	–	–	84	78
Wickets	–	–	0	3
Bowling average	–	–	–	31.00
5 wickets in innings	–	–	0	0
10 wickets in match	–	–	0	0
Best bowling	–	–	–	2/15
Catches/stumpings	3/–	3/–	26/–	73/–
- Source: ESPNcricinfo, 18 July 2026

Christopher Austin Lynn (born 10 April 1990) is an Australian cricketer. He is a right-handed batsman who plays for Queensland and the Adelaide Strikers in Australian domestic cricket. Lynn was born in Brisbane, Queensland, and attended St Joseph's Nudgee College and the Queensland Academy of Sport. He is known for being an explosive batsman capable of hitting big sixes.

== Early career and life ==
When not on professional duties, Lynn plays senior cricket for Toombul District Cricket Club in Brisbane. Lynn is a supporter of the Brisbane Broncos in the National Rugby League.

Lynn played for the Queensland under-19 team and made his first-class debut as a 19-year-old against South Australia at the Gabba in March 2010. A week later, against Western Australia, he scored 139 runs in the second innings and effectively saved Queensland from defeat. He represented the Brisbane Heat in the Big Bash League between 2011 and 2022. In his first season, he made 109 runs at an average of 21.80, in his second he made 175 runs at 35.00, including 51 off 29 balls against the Perth Scorchers and in his third he scored 198 runs at 28.28 with his best innings again coming against the Scorchers; this time he made 81.

== Domestic, T20 career ==
=== India ===
He was a part of the Deccan Chargers team during the 2011 and 2012 Indian Premier League (IPL) tournaments but only got to play one match for the team in IPL 2012. For the 2014, season he was signed by the Kolkata Knight Riders and in his first match he was the man of the match, scoring 45 off 31 balls and taking a brilliant catch near the boundary to dismiss AB de Villiers that turned the game in the final over. In IPL 2015, he was retained by the Kolkata Knight Riders but he got injured and was ruled out of the tournament. Johan Botha came in as a replacement. He hit a career best 19-ball 50 as opener of Kolkata Knight Riders vs Gujarat Lions in IPL 2017 in which he hit 8 sixes . In the following match against the Mumbai Indians, he injured his shoulder while attempting to take a tough catch of Jos Buttler. He returned 1 month later and smashed a 22 ball 50 in his comeback match against Royal Challengers Bangalore, where he and Sunil Narine (54 off 17) smashed 105 runs in the first 6 overs. It is the second most runs scored by a team in the Powerplay in IPL history. He continued his good form by scoring 84 in the next match, although unfortunately in a losing cause. He finished the season with a staggering strike rate of over 180, and despite missing most of the season, was one of the most important players for the Kolkata Knight Riders. He was released by the Kolkata Knight Riders ahead of the 2020 IPL auction. In the 2020 IPL auction, he was bought by the Mumbai Indians ahead of the 2020 Indian Premier League.

=== Australia ===
On 9 February 2015, he scored an unbeaten 250 against Victoria, in the Sheffield Shield. On 29 December 2015, scored his first T20 century. Playing for Brisbane Heat in the Big Bash League hit 101 off 51 deliveries against the Hobart Hurricanes. He ended the season as the competition's leading run scorer, scoring three half centuries on top of his century, ending the tournament with 378 runs at an average of 54.00. He was named the player of the tournament.

Lynn's form continued in the next edition of the Big Bash League, ending the season as the player of the tournament despite playing just five matches. He scored an unbeaten 85 against Sydney Thunder on 28 December 2016, an unbeaten 84 against Hobart Hurricanes two days later and 98 not out against the Perth Scorchers on 5 January 2017, an innings which contained 11 sixes. Once again, Lynn was named player of the tournament, scoring 309 runs at an average of 154.50.

In the following season, Lynn was restricted by injury, playing just the five matches and scoring 148 runs at 37.00.

Lynn was fit enough to play the entire season of the 2018–19 Big Bash League, ending the season as the Heat's leading run scorer with 385 runs at an average of 35.00.

In the 2021–22 Big Bash League season, Lynn scored 215 runs at an average of 17.91, which followed in his axing from the club.

=== North America ===
In the 2018 Caribbean Premier League player draft he was bought by Trinbago Knight Riders. In May 2018, he was named as one of the ten marquee players for the first edition of the Global T20 Canada cricket tournament. On 3 June 2018, he was selected to play for the Edmonton Royals in the players' draft for the inaugural edition of the tournament. In June 2019, he was selected to play for the Winnipeg Hawks franchise team in the 2019 Global T20 Canada tournament.

In July 2020, he was named in the St Kitts & Nevis Patriots squad for the 2020 Caribbean Premier League.

In 2023, he returned to GT20 Canada, playing for Montreal Tigers. He captained the team to the championship trophy, and finished the tournament with the most runs scored.

=== Europe ===
In July 2019, he was selected to play for the Edinburgh Rocks in the inaugural edition of the Euro T20 Slam cricket tournament. However, the following month the tournament was cancelled.

=== Pakistan ===
At 2018 PSL players draft, he was picked by Lahore Qalandars as their platinum pick. However, shoulder injury made him unavailable for the entire season. He was replaced by South Africa's Kyle Abbott.

In December 2019, he was again drafted by Lahore Qalandars as their Platinum Category round pick at the 2020 PSL draft for the fifth season, played entirely in Pakistan for the first time. He was the team's leading and overall the second highest runs-getter of the season, with 284 runs in 8 innings, including a knock of 113 not out (his best T20 score, until date) during team's last group stage match against Multan Sultans, which helped Qalandars to qualify for the play-offs for the first time in their history.

=== England ===
Lynn joined Northamptonshire Steelbacks as an overseas player for the 2022 Vitality Blast campaign. In his debut season for Northants, he scored 516 runs at an average of 64.50, including two centuries and four half-centuries. He returned to the club for the 2023 season, scoring 364 runs at an average of 30.33 with one century. During his initial two stints, he became the first player in Northamptonshire history to score three T20 centuries for the club.

After spending the 2025 season with Hampshire, Lynn rejoined the Steelbacks in 2026. In November 2026, the Cricket Regulator reported that Lynn had served a one-month ban after returning an Adverse Analytical Finding for cocaine's metabolite, benzoylecgonine, from the sample taken on Finals Day. Lynn accepted the sanction, and having completed the suspension period, was cleared to resume playing. No team sanctions were applied to Northamptonshire.

=== Full domestic team information ===
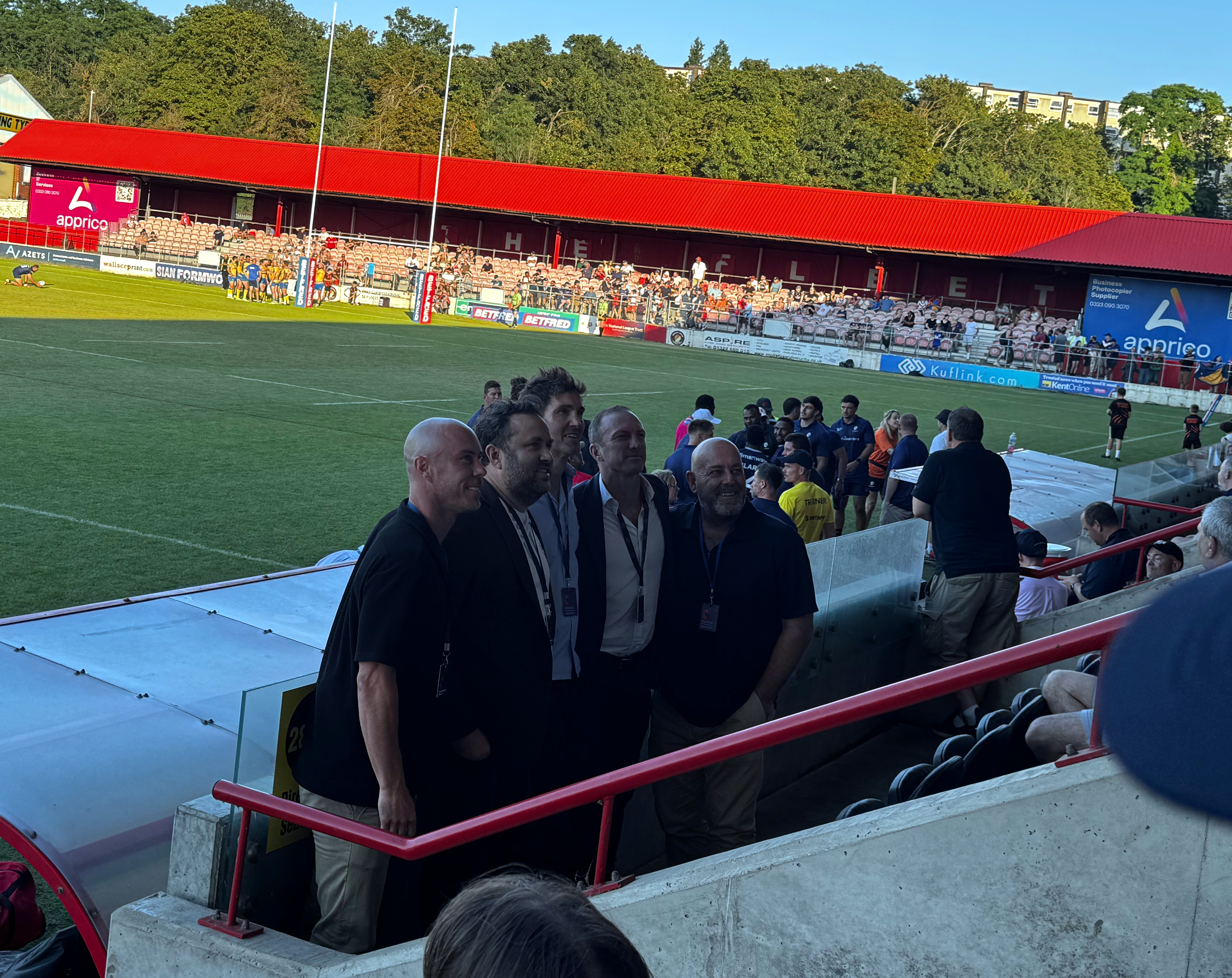
Lynn alongside Grant Wechsel, Andrew Gray, Darren Lockyer & Darren Lehmann in July 2026

Team	Country	League	Seasons
Queensland	Australia	All domestic competitions	2009/10–2018/19
Brisbane Heat	Australia	Big Bash League	2011/12–2021/22
Deccan Chargers	India	Indian Premier League	2011–2012
Kandurata Warriors	Sri Lanka	Sri Lanka Premier League	2012
Sunrisers Hyderabad	India	Indian Premier League	2013
Kolkata Knight Riders	India	Indian Premier League	2014–2019
Jamaica Tallawahs	Jamaica	Caribbean Premier League	2015
Guyana Amazon Warriors	Guyana	Caribbean Premier League	2016
Khulna Tigers	Bangladesh	Bangladesh Premier League	2017
Trinbago Knight Riders	Trinidad and Tobago	Caribbean Premier League	2018
Lahore Qalandars	Pakistan	Pakistan Super League	2020
St Kitts & Nevis Patriots	St Kitts and Nevis	Caribbean Premier League	2020
Mumbai Indians	India	Indian Premier League	2021
Multan Sultans	Pakistan	Pakistan Super League	2021
Northern Superchargers	England	The Hundred	2021
Northamptonshire	England	T20 Blast	2022–2023, 2026
Adelaide Strikers	Australia	Big Bash League	2022/23–Present
Gulf Giants	United Arab Emirates	International League T20	2022/23–2024
Jaffna Kings	Sri Lanka	Lanka Premier League	2023
Montreal Tigers	Canada	Global T20 Canada	2023–2024
Hampshire	England	T20 Blast	2025
Sudurpaschim Royals	Nepal	Nepal Premier League	2025-
Galle Gallants	Sri Lanka	Lanka Premier League	2026

== International career ==
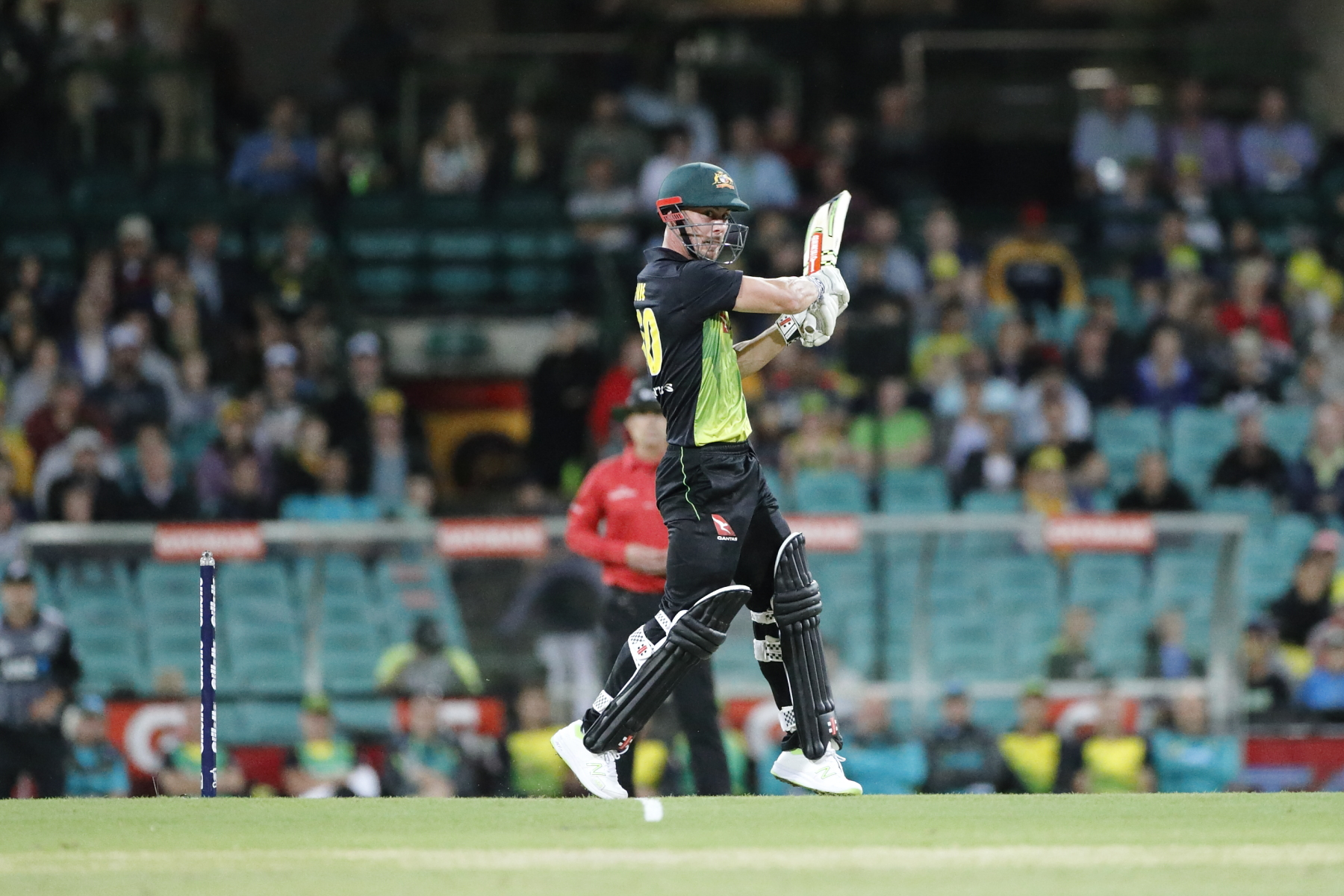
Lynn in a match vs New Zealand (2018)

Lynn made his Twenty20 International (T20I) debut against England in Hobart on 29 January 2014. He made 33 off 19 balls, including three sixes, but did not get to bat in his second game. Despite his reputation as a power hitter in domestic leagues, his international appearances were frequently curtailed by recurring shoulder injuries.

In January 2017, he was named in Australia One Day International (ODI) squad for their series against Pakistan, making his debut at the Brisbane Cricket Ground on 13 January 2017. Later that year, despite suffering a serious shoulder injury during the 2017 Indian Premier League, he completed a heavy rehabilitation program to maintain his selection for the 2017 Champions Trophy.

Lynn returned to the T20I side for the 2017-18 Trans-Tasman Tri-Series, where he played a key role in the top order, helping Australia to an undefeated run and the tournament title. He made final appearances for the national side in November 2018 during the home series against South Africa and India. In total, he represented Australia in 4 ODIs and 18 T20Is.

== Playing style ==
Chris Lynn is a hard hitting batsman who is known for his extraordinary hitting and explosive power. He is able to consistently hit sixes over 90 metres. During a game in the Big Bash League, playing for the Brisbane Heat, Lynn hit a ball from former Australian fast bowler Shaun Tait onto the roof of The Gabba. Lynn set a new record with his explosive knock hitting 91 runs from 30 balls playing for Maratha Arabians against Abu Dhabi in T10 league.
