= 2027 Pakistan Super League =

12th edition of the Pakistan Super League

2027 Pakistan Super League پاکستان سپر لیگ ۲۰۲۷
- Dates: 18 March – 2 May 2027
- Administrator: Pakistan Cricket Board
- Cricket format: Twenty20
- Tournament format(s): Group round-robin and play-offs
- Host: Pakistan
- Participants: 08
- Matches: 44
- Official website: psl-t20.com

The 2027 Pakistan Super League (branded as HBL PSL 12) is the upcoming twelfth edition of the Pakistan Super League (PSL), a professional Twenty20 cricket league organised by the Pakistan Cricket Board (PCB). The league's eight franchises are scheduled to play 44 matches between 18 March to 2 May 2027.

Peshawar Zalmi are the defending champions.

== Background ==
On 3 May 2026, Peshawar Zalmi claimed their second PSL title at the 2026 season after defeating debutants Hyderabad Kingsmen by five wickets in the final at Lahore’s Gaddafi Stadium.

In October 2026, the Pakistan Cricket Board announced that the 12th edition of the Pakistan Super League is scheduled to be held from 18 March to 2 May 2027. According to the PCB, the window was finalised following a meeting of the PSL governing council in London on 1 September 2026.

== Squads ==
The squad-building process for the eight franchises — Karachi Kings, Lahore Qalandars, Islamabad United, Peshawar Zalmi, Quetta Gladiators, Multan Sultans, Hyderabad Kingsmen and Rawalpindiz — is to include direct signings, player retentions, a trade window and the player auction.

The inaugural auction, held in February 2026, concluded with the eight franchises acquiring 103 players on two-year contracts covering the 11th and 12th editions, with franchises allowed to retain up to seven players for the 2027 season. However, any side retaining seven players will have to release a top-tier player of the 2026 auction into the general player pool.

On 23 October 2026, PCB opened the direct signings window for all eight franchises until 23 November 2026. Each franchise is allowed to sign one marquee player who did not feature in either of the last two editions, under the direct signing rules.

The player retentions window is set to end on 13 January 2027.

The player auction is scheduled for 23 January 2027. Each franchise will operate under a salary cap of Rs.450 million during the auction. If a franchise makes a direct signing for the 12th edition, retains its direct signing from the 11th season, or opts for both, the salary cap will increase to Rs.505 million. Moreover, each franchise must allocate at least Rs.365 million towards its squad.
