= 2020 Pakistan Super League =

5th edition of the Pakistan Super League

Pakistan Super League 2020
- Dates: 20 February – 17 November 2020
- Administrator: Pakistan Cricket Board
- Cricket format: Twenty20
- Tournament format(s): Double round robin and playoffs
- Champions: Karachi Kings (1st title)
- Runners-up: Lahore Qalandars
- Participants: 6
- Matches: 34
- Attendance: 555,320 (16,333 per match)
- Player of the series: Babar Azam (KK) (473 runs)
- Most runs: Babar Azam (KK) (473)
- Most wickets: Shaheen Afridi (LQ) (17)
- Official website: psl-t20.com

The 2020 Pakistan Super League, also known as PSL 5 and branded as HBL PSL V, was the fifth edition of the Pakistan Super League, a professional Twenty20 cricket league which was established by the Pakistan Cricket Board (PCB). It started on 20 February 2020. The league was held entirely in Pakistan for the first time. Karachi Kings won their first title after defeating Lahore Qalandars by five wickets in the final.

The playoff stage of the tournament was postponed due to the COVID-19 pandemic. In late March 2020, the PCB were looking at whether to declare the winner of the tournament based on the league standings, or to play the matches at a later date. On 2 July 2020, the PCB announced that they plan to complete the season in November 2020. On 2 September 2020, the PCB confirmed the fixtures for the remaining matches.

== Background ==
In February 2019, the Prime Minister of Pakistan, Imran Khan, announced that the fifth season of the tournament will be held entirely in Pakistan. In March 2019, Ehsan Mani, Chairman of Pakistan Cricket Board also expressed the desire to host all the matches of this season in Pakistan. On 1 January 2020, PCB announced fixtures for the tournament confirming that the entire tournament will take place in Pakistan.

== Teams and squads ==
Islamabad United	Karachi Kings	Lahore Qalandars	Multan Sultans	Peshawar Zalmi	Quetta Gladiators
Shadab Khan (c); Luke Ronchi (wk); Amad Butt; Faheem Ashraf; Asif Ali; Hussain Talat; Muhammad Musa; Rizwan Hussain; Dale Steyn; Colin Ingram; Colin Munro; Rumman Raees; Zafar Gohar; Phil Salt; Akif Javed; Dawid Malan; ~~Rassie van der Dussen~~; Saif Badar; Ahmed Safi Abdullah	Imad Wasim (c); Shahid Afridi; Iftikhar Ahmed; Mohammad Amir; Aamer Yamin; Usama Mir; Umer Khan; Alex Hales; Chris Jordan; Sharjeel Khan; Cameron Delport; Ali Khan; Chadwick Walton (wk); ~~Dan Lawrence~~; Umaid Asif; ~~Mitchell McClenaghan~~; ~~Liam Plunkett~~; Awais Zia; Arshad Iqbal; Waqas Maqsood	Sohail Akhtar (c); Mohammad Hafeez; Dilbar Hussain; Abid Ali; ~~Agha Salman~~; Shaheen Afridi; Ben Dunk (wk); David Wiese; Haris Rauf; Dane Vilas (wk); Salman Butt; Usman Shinwari; Fakhar Zaman; Chris Lynn; Samit Patel; Seekkuge Prasanna; Jaahid Ali (wk); Raja Farzan; Muhammad Faizan; ~~Lendl Simmons~~; Salman Irshad; Maaz Khan	Shan Masood (c); Shahid Afridi; Rohail Nazir (wk); Ali Shafiq; Babar Azam; Mohammad Ilyas; ~~James Vince~~; Junaid Khan; Moeen Ali; Rilee Rossouw; Zeeshan Ashraf (wk); Ravi Bopara; Sohail Tanvir; Wayne Madsen; Khushdil Shah; Fabian Allen; Usman Qadir; Imran Tahir; Bilawal Bhatti; Asad Shafiq	Wahab Riaz (c) (Note: Darren Sammy stepped down as captain of Peshawar Zalmi mid tournament becoming head coach of the team and Wahab Riaz was appointed as team captain.); ~~Sikandar Raza~~; ~~Daren Sammy~~; Kamran Akmal (wk); Hammad Azam; Shoaib Malik; Hasan Ali; Umar Amin; Imam-ul-Haq; ~~Kieron Pollard~~; Tom Banton (wk); Liam Dawson; Lewis Gregory; Carlos Brathwaite; Mohammad Mohsin; Yasir Shah; Rahat Ali; Adil Amin; ~~Dwaine Pretorius~~; Liam Livingstone; Haider Ali; ~~Mohammad Amir Khan~~; Aamir Ali; Mohammad Irfan; Ali Khan	Sarfaraz Ahmed (c) (wk); ~~Umar Akmal~~; Ahmed Shehzad; Ahsan Ali; Ben Cutting; Mohammad Hasnain; Mohammad Nawaz; Naseem Shah; Shane Watson; Jason Roy; Fawad Ahmed; Tymal Mills; Abdul Nasir; Sohail Khan; Khurram Manzoor; Keemo Paul; Arish Ali Khan; Azam Khan (wk); Zahid Mahmood; Anwar Ali; Omair Yousuf
Additional players selected for Playoffs
	Sherfane Rutherford; Wayne Parnell	Tamim Iqbal; Mohammad Imran	~~Mahmudullah~~; Adam Lyth; Joe Denly; Brendan Taylor	Faf du Plessis; Hardus Viljoen; Khurram Shehzad; Saqib Mahmood; Sohaib Maqsood	

The players draft took place on 6 December, with the first round taking place on 3 November 2019. Ahead of the draft, each team was allowed to retain up to eight players from their previous squad. On 1 December 2019, PCB announced the retention players list with all six teams retaining a total of 45 players from the previous season.

Ahead of the play-offs, teams included new players in their squad as Faf du Plessis, Khurram Shehzad and Hardus Viljoen replaced Kieron Pollard, Mohammad Amir Khan and Liam Dawson respectively, in Peshawar Zalmi squad. In Multan Sultans squad Mahmudullah and Adam Lyth replaced Moeen Ali and Fabian Allen respectively. Lahore Qalandars replaced Chris Lynn, Salman Butt and Seekkuge Prasanna with Tamim Iqbal, Abid Ali and Agha Salman respectively. While, Karachi Kings replaced Chris Jordan and Ali Khan with Sherfane Rutherford and Waqas Maqsood. On 7 November 2020, Peshawar Zalmi replaced England's Liam Livingstone with his national side teammate Saqib Mahmood after he was included in the national team against South Africa. On 8 November, Multan Sultans's squad members Mahmudullah tested positive for COVID-19 making him unable to take part in the tournament and was replaced by Brendan Taylor, and James Vince was replaced by Joe Denly after he also tested positive for COVID-19. Kings' Mitchell McClenaghan and Zalmi's Daren Sammy were replaced by Wayne Parnell and Sohaib Maqsood respectively. Few days later, Hasan Ali of Peshawar Zalmi was ruled out of the tournament due to back-strain and was replaced by Mohammad Imran, and in Lahore Qalandars squad, Salman Irshad replaced Agha Salman who suffered an ankle injury.

== Venues ==
The tournament took place entirely in Pakistan. Total 34 matches were played in four venues Lahore, Karachi, Rawalpindi and Multan. The opening ceremony took place in Karachi. The playoffs were scheduled to take place in Lahore in November 2020, after being postponed for 8 months due to COVID-19 pandemic but were later shifted to Karachi.

Lahore	Karachi	Rawalpindi	Multan
Gaddafi Stadium	National Stadium	Rawalpindi Cricket Stadium	Multan Cricket Stadium
Capacity: 27,000	Capacity: 32,000	Capacity: 17,000	Capacity: 35,000
Matches: 11	Matches: 12	Matches: 8	Matches: 3
2020 Pakistan Super League is located in Pakistan

== Match officials ==
=== Umpires ===
- Faisal Afridi
- Aslam Bareach
- Aleem Dar
- Michael Gough
- Majid Hussain
- Nasir Hussain
- Richard Illingworth
- Imtiaz Iqbal
- Saqib Khan
- Ranmore Martinesz
- Tariq Rasheed
- Ahsan Raza
- Shozab Raza
- Rashid Riaz
- Asif Yaqoob

=== Referees ===
- Mohammad Anees
- Muhammad Javed
- Roshan Mahanama
- Aziz-ur-Rehman

== Marketing ==
=== Anthem ===
The league was promoted on social media by the hashtag #HBLPSLV and anthem titled #TayyarHain. The opening ceremony was held in Karachi, for the first time in Pakistan.

=== Cancer awareness ===
The childhood cancer awareness day and the breast cancer awareness day were observed on 22 February and 7 March respectively, with the stadiums themed as gold and pink respectively.

== COVID-19 pandemic impact ==
The later part of the tournament was affected by COVID-19 pandemic. The matches were reduced from 34 to 33 and the playoffs were replaced by knockouts thus shortening the tournament by 4 days. The final was rescheduled from 22 March to 18 March. The matches from 13 March were announced to take place behind closed doors.

As many as eighteen players were confirmed to not take part in any future matches after the increased cases of COVID-19 in Pakistan as well as in the rest of the world, and also to avoid being stranded from their home countries due to border closures, as was the case for New Zealanders Colin Munro, Luke Ronchi, and Mitchell McClenaghan.

On 17 March 2020, it was announced that the knockout stage is suspended after English cricketer Alex Hales showed symptoms of the virus. Hales observed self-isolation on his return to England, whereas PCB released a statement saying that Hales was not the player suspected of coronavirus and instead refused to reveal the identity of the player suspected of having COVID-19.

== League stage ==
=== Format ===
The six teams played 10 matches each and got 2 points for every win, none for a loss and 1 point for a no result. The top four team in the group stage were qualified for the play-offs.

=== Points table ===
Pos	Team	Pld	W	L	NR	Pts	NRR
1	Multan Sultans (3rd)	10	6	2	2	14	1.031
2	Karachi Kings (C)	10	5	4	1	11	−0.190
3	Lahore Qalandars (R)	10	5	5	0	10	−0.072
4	Peshawar Zalmi (4th)	10	4	5	1	9	−0.055
5	Quetta Gladiators	10	4	5	1	9	−0.722
6	Islamabad United	10	3	6	1	7	0.185

Source: ESPNcricinfo
- The top four teams qualified for the playoffs
- Advanced to Qualifier
- Advanced to Eliminator 1

=== Summary ===
Visitor team →	IU	KK	LQ	MS	PZ	QG
Home team ↓	IU	KK	LQ	MS	PZ	QG
Islamabad United		Karachi; 5 wickets	Islamabad; 71 runs	Multan; 9 wickets	Match abandoned	Quetta; 5 wickets
Karachi Kings	Karachi; 4 wickets		Karachi; 10 wickets	Match abandoned	Karachi; 10 runs	Quetta; 5 wickets
Lahore Qalandars	Islamabad; 1 wicket	Lahore; 8 wickets		Multan; 5 wickets	Lahore; 5 wickets	Lahore; 37 runs
Multan Sultans	Islamabad; 8 wickets	Multan; 52 runs	Lahore; 9 wickets		Multan; 6 wickets	Multan; 30 runs
Peshawar Zalmi	Peshawar; 7 runs (D/L)	Karachi; 6 wickets	Peshawar; 16 runs	Multan; 3 runs		Peshawar; 30 runs
Quetta Gladiators	Quetta; 3 wickets	Quetta; 5 wickets	Lahore; 8 wickets	Match abandoned	Peshawar; 6 wickets	

Home team won	Visitor team won

- Note: Results listed are according to the home (horizontal) and visitor (vertical) teams.
- Note: Click on a result to see a summary of the match.

=== League progression ===
Team	Group matches										Playoffs		
Team	1	2	3	4	5	6	7	8	9	10	E1/Q	E2	F
Islamabad United	0	2	4	4	5	5	7	7	7	7			
Karachi Kings	2	2	2	4	6	7	7	9	11	11	W		W
Lahore Qalandars	0	0	0	2	2	4	6	8	8	10	W	W	L
Multan Sultans	2	2	4	6	8	9	11	12	14	14	L	L	
Peshawar Zalmi	0	2	2	4	5	5	7	9	9	9	L		
Quetta Gladiators	2	2	4	6	6	6	6	6	7	9			

Win	Loss	No result

- Note: The total points at the end of each group match are listed.
- Note: Click on the points (group matches) or W/L (playoffs) to see the match summary.

== Fixtures ==
The PCB confirmed the fixtures for the tournament on 1 January 2020. (Note: All times are in UTC+5 (PKT))

Match 1
20 February 2020
21:30 (D/N)
Scorecard

Islamabad United; 168 (19.1 overs)	v	Quetta Gladiators; 171/7 (18.3 overs)
Dawid Malan 64 (40); Mohammad Hasnain 4/25 (4 overs)		Azam Khan 59 (33); Muhammad Musa 3/30 (4 overs)

Quetta Gladiators won by 3 wickets
National Stadium, Karachi
Umpires: Faisal Afridi (Pak) and Richard Illingworth (Eng)
Player of the match: Mohammad Hasnain (Quetta Gladiators)

- Quetta Gladiators won the toss and elected to field.
- Abdul Nasir (Quetta Gladiators) made his T20 debut.

Match 2
21 February 2020
15:00
Scorecard

Karachi Kings; 201/4 (20 overs)	v	Peshawar Zalmi; 191/7 (20 overs)
Babar Azam 78 (56); Hasan Ali 2/52 (4 overs)		Liam Livingstone 54* (29); Umaid Asif 2/23 (4 overs)

Karachi Kings won by 10 runs
National Stadium, Karachi
Umpires: Faisal Afridi (Pak) and Richard Illingworth (Eng)
Player of the match: Babar Azam (Karachi Kings)

- Peshawar Zalmi won the toss and elected to field.

Match 3
21 February 2020
20:00 (D/N)
Scorecard

Lahore Qalandars; 138/8 (20 overs)	v	Multan Sultans; 142/5 (16.1 overs)
Chris Lynn 39 (19); Moeen Ali 2/13 (2 overs)		Shan Masood 38 (29); David Wiese 1/11 (2 overs)

Multan Sultans won by 5 wickets
Gaddafi Stadium, Lahore
Umpires: Ranmore Martinesz (SL) and Rashid Riaz (Pak)
Player of the match: Imran Tahir (Multan Sultans)

- Multan Sultans won the toss and elected to field.

Match 4
22 February 2020
14:00
Scorecard

Quetta Gladiators; 148/5 (20 overs)	v	Peshawar Zalmi; 153/4 (18.3 overs)
Jason Roy 73* (57); Wahab Riaz 2/21 (4 overs)		Kamran Akmal 101 (55); Fawad Ahmed 2/40 (3.3 overs)

Peshawar Zalmi won by 6 wickets
National Stadium, Karachi
Umpires: Faisal Afridi (Pak) and Richard Illingworth (Eng)
Player of the match: Kamran Akmal (Peshawar Zalmi)

- Peshawar Zalmi won the toss and elected to field.
- Mohammad Amir Khan (Peshawar Zalmi) made his T20 debut.

Match 5
22 February 2020
19:00 (D/N)
Scorecard

Multan Sultans; 164/8 (20 overs)	v	Islamabad United; 165/2 (16.4 overs)
Zeeshan Ashraf 50 (29); Amad Butt 4/27 (4 overs)		Luke Ronchi 74 (45); Mohammad Ilyas 1/17 (2.4 overs)

Islamabad United won by 8 wickets
Gaddafi Stadium, Lahore
Umpires: Ranmore Martinesz (SL) and Shozab Raza (Pak)
Player of the match: Luke Ronchi (Islamabad United)

- Islamabad United won the toss and elected to field.

Match 6
23 February 2020
14:00
Scorecard

Karachi Kings; 156/9 (20 overs)	v	Quetta Gladiators; 157/5 (19 overs)
Alex Hales 29 (27); Mohammad Hasnain 3/33 (4 overs)		Azam Khan 46 (30); Imad Wasim 1/20 (4 overs)

Quetta Gladiators won by 5 wickets
National Stadium, Karachi
Umpires: Faisal Afridi (Pak) and Richard Illingworth (Eng)
Player of the match: Azam Khan (Quetta Gladiators)

- Karachi Kings won the toss and elected to bat.

Match 7
23 February 2020
19:00 (D/N)
Scorecard

Lahore Qalandars; 182/6 (20 overs)	v	Islamabad United; 183/9 (19.5 overs)
Mohammad Hafeez 98* (57); Shadab Khan 2/14 (4 overs)		Shadab Khan 52 (29); Shaheen Afridi 4/18 (4 overs)

Islamabad United won by 1 wicket
Gaddafi Stadium, Lahore
Attendance: 12,500
Umpires: Ranmore Martinesz (SL) and Rashid Riaz (Pak)
Player of the match: Shadab Khan (Islamabad United)

- Islamabad United won the toss and elected to field.
- Ahmed Safi Abdullah (Islamabad United) made his T20 debut.

Match 8
26 February 2020
19:00 (D/N)
Scorecard

Peshawar Zalmi; 123 (18.3 overs)	v	Multan Sultans; 124/4 (14.5 overs)
Haider Ali 47 (27); Sohail Tanvir 4/13 (3.3 overs)		Rilee Rossouw 49* (42); Wahab Riaz 2/36 (3.5 overs)

Multan Sultans won by 6 wickets
Multan Cricket Stadium, Multan
Umpires: Faisal Afridi (Pak) and Asif Yaqoob (Pak)
Player of the match: Sohail Tanvir (Multan Sultans)

- Multan Sultans won the toss and elected to field.

Match 9
27 February 2020
19:00 (D/N)
Scorecard

Islamabad United; 187/7 (20 overs)	v	Quetta Gladiators; 190/5 (19.4 overs)
Colin Ingram 63* (40); Naseem Shah 2/23 (4 overs)		Jason Roy 50 (38); Ahmed Safi Abdullah 2/17 (3 overs)

Quetta Gladiators won by 5 wickets
Rawalpindi Cricket Stadium, Rawalpindi
Umpires: Ranmore Martinesz (SL) and Tariq Rasheed (Pak)
Player of the match: Ben Cutting (Quetta Gladiators)

- Quetta Gladiators won the toss and elected to field.

Match 10
28 February 2020
15:00
Scorecard

Multan Sultans; 186/6 (20 overs)	v	Karachi Kings; 134 (17 overs)
Moeen Ali 65 (42); Mohammad Amir 2/27 (4 overs)		Alex Hales 29 (21); Imran Tahir 3/28 (3 overs)

Multan Sultans won by 52 runs
Multan Cricket Stadium, Multan
Umpires: Faisal Afridi (Pak) and Shozab Raza (Pak)
Player of the match: Moeen Ali (Multan Sultans)

- Karachi Kings won the toss and elected to field.

Match 11
28 February 2020
20:00 (D/N)
Scorecard

Peshawar Zalmi; 132/7 (12 overs)	v	Lahore Qalandars; 116/6 (12 overs)
Haider Ali 34 (12); Dilbar Hussain 4/24 (3 overs)		Samit Patel 34* (15); Lewis Gregory 4/25 (3 overs)

Peshawar Zalmi won by 16 runs
Rawalpindi Cricket Stadium, Rawalpindi
Umpires: Ranmore Martinesz (SL) and Tariq Rasheed (Pak)
Player of the match: Lewis Gregory (Peshawar Zalmi)

- Lahore Qalandars won the toss and elected to field.
- The match was reduced to 12 overs per side due to rain.

Match 12
29 February 2020
14:00
Scorecard

Multan Sultans; 199/5 (20 overs)	v	Quetta Gladiators; 169/7 (20 overs)
Rilee Rossouw 100* (44); Mohammad Nawaz 1/16 (3 overs)		Shane Watson 80 (41); Bilawal Bhatti 3/26 (4 overs)

Multan Sultans won by 30 runs
Multan Cricket Stadium, Multan
Umpires: Faisal Afridi (Pak) and Asif Yaqoob (Pak)
Player of the match: Rilee Rossouw (Multan Sultans)

- Multan Sultans won the toss and elected to bat.
- Rilee Rossouw (Multan Sultans) scored the fastest century in the PSL (43 balls).

Match 13
29 February 2020
19:00 (D/N)
Scorecard

Islamabad United	v	Peshawar Zalmi

Match abandoned
Rawalpindi Cricket Stadium, Rawalpindi
Umpires: Ranmore Martinesz (SL) and Tariq Rasheed (Pak)

- No toss.
- No play was possible due to rain.

Match 14
1 March 2020
19:00 (D/N)
Scorecard

Islamabad United; 183/3 (20 overs)	v	Karachi Kings; 187/5 (18.4 overs)
Luke Ronchi 85* (58); Umer Khan 1/24 (4 overs)		Alex Hales 52 (30); Ahmed Safi Abdullah 1/21 (2 overs)

Karachi Kings won by 5 wickets
Rawalpindi Cricket Stadium, Rawalpindi
Umpires: Ranmore Martinesz (SL) and Tariq Rasheed (Pak)
Player of the match: Alex Hales (Karachi Kings)

- Karachi Kings won the toss and elected to field.

Match 15
2 March 2020
19:00 (D/N)
Scorecard

Peshawar Zalmi; 151/8 (20 overs)	v	Karachi Kings; 152/4 (18.1 overs)
Shoaib Malik 68 (55); Mohammad Amir 4/25 (4 overs)		Babar Azam 70* (59); Yasir Shah 2/28 (4 overs)

Karachi Kings won by 6 wickets
Rawalpindi Cricket Stadium, Rawalpindi
Attendance: 15,500
Umpires: Ranmore Martinesz (SL) and Tariq Rasheed (Pak)
Player of the match: Mohammad Amir (Karachi Kings)

- Karachi Kings won the toss and elected to field.

Match 16
3 March 2020
19:00 (D/N)
Scorecard

Lahore Qalandars; 209/5 (20 overs)	v	Quetta Gladiators; 172 (20 overs)
Ben Dunk 93 (43); Ben Cutting 2/36 (3 overs)		Ben Cutting 53 (27); Salman Irshad 4/30 (4 overs)

Lahore Qalandars won by 37 runs
Gaddafi Stadium, Lahore
Attendance: 20,500
Umpires: Faisal Afridi (Pak) and Shozab Raza (Pak)
Player of the match: Ben Dunk (Lahore Qalandars)

- Quetta Gladiators won the toss and elected to field.

Match 17
4 March 2020
19:00 (D/N)
Scorecard

Islamabad United; 198/3 (20 overs)	v	Lahore Qalandars; 127 (18.5 overs)
Colin Munro 87* (59); Mohammad Hafeez 1/11 (2 overs)		Usman Shinwari 30 (14); Rumman Raees 3/29 (3.5 overs)

Islamabad United won by 71 runs
Gaddafi Stadium, Lahore
Umpires: Shozab Raza (Pak) and Asif Yaqoob (Pak)
Player of the match: Colin Munro (Islamabad United)

- Lahore Qalandars won the toss and elected to field.

Match 18
5 March 2020
19:00 (D/N)
Scorecard

Peshawar Zalmi; 170/6 (15 overs)	v	Quetta Gladiators; 140/7 (15 overs)
Shoaib Malik 54 (27); Mohammad Hasnain 4/34 (3 overs)		Jason Roy 45 (26); Wahab Riaz 3/21 (3 overs)

Peshawar Zalmi won by 30 runs
Rawalpindi Cricket Stadium, Rawalpindi
Umpires: Ranmore Martinesz (SL) and Tariq Rasheed (Pak)
Player of the match: Shoaib Malik (Peshawar Zalmi)

- Quetta Gladiators won the toss and elected to bat
- The match was reduced to 15 overs per side due to rain.

Match 19
6 March 2020
19:00 (D/N)
Scorecard

Multan Sultans; 102/6 (16.5 overs)	v	Karachi Kings
Shahid Afridi 35* (17); Imad Wasim 2/14 (4 overs)

No result
Gaddafi Stadium, Lahore
Umpires: Michael Gough (Eng) and Shozab Raza (Pak)

- Karachi Kings won the toss and elected to field.
- No further play was possible due to rain.

Match 20
7 March 2020
14:00
Scorecard

Islamabad United; 195/5 (20 overs)	v	Peshawar Zalmi; 85/2 (9 overs)
Shadab Khan 77 (42); Hasan Ali 2/36 (4 overs)		Kamran Akmal 37 (21); Zafar Gohar 1/11 (2 overs)

Peshawar Zalmi won by 7 runs (DLS method)
Rawalpindi Cricket Stadium, Rawalpindi
Umpires: Tariq Rasheed (Pak) and Rashid Riaz (Pak)
Player of the match: Shadab Khan (Islamabad United)

- Peshawar Zalmi won the toss and elected to field.

Match 21
7 March 2020
19:00 (D/N)
Scorecard

Quetta Gladiators; 98/9 (20 overs)	v	Lahore Qalandars; 100/2 (11.5 overs)
Sohail Khan 32 (35); Samit Patel 4/5 (4 overs)		Mohammad Hafeez 39* (32); Mohammad Nawaz 2/9 (3 overs)

Lahore Qalandars won by 8 wickets
Gaddafi Stadium, Lahore
Umpires: Michael Gough (Eng) and Asif Yaqoob (Pak)
Player of the match: Samit Patel (Lahore Qalandars)

- Lahore Qalandars won the toss and elected to field.

Match 22
8 March 2020
14:00
Scorecard

Islamabad United; 91/7 (9 overs)	v	Multan Sultans; 94/1 (6.4 overs)
Colin Munro 25 (12); Imran Tahir 2/13 (2 overs)		James Vince 61* (24); Shadab Khan 1/30 (2 overs)

Multan Sultans won by 9 wickets
Rawalpindi Cricket Stadium, Rawalpindi
Umpires: Ranmore Martinesz (SL) and Tariq Rasheed (Pak)
Player of the match: James Vince (Multan Sultans)

- Multan Sultans won the toss and elected to field.
- The match was reduced to 9 overs per side due to rain.
- Multan Sultans qualified for the play-offs.

Match 23
8 March 2020
19:00 (D/N)
Scorecard

Karachi Kings; 187/5 (20 overs)	v	Lahore Qalandars; 190/2 (19.1 overs)
Alex Hales 80* (48); Maaz Khan 2/31 (4 Overs)		Ben Dunk 99* (40); Mohammad Amir 1/33 (4 overs)

Lahore Qalandars won by 8 wickets
Gaddafi Stadium, Lahore
Umpires: Michael Gough (Eng) and Shozab Raza (Pak)
Player of the match: Ben Dunk (Lahore Qalandars)

- Lahore Qalandars won the toss and elected to field.

Match 24
10 March 2020
19:00 (D/N)
Scorecard

Peshawar Zalmi; 187/7 (20 overs)	v	Lahore Qalandars; 189/5 (19.5 overs)
Haider Ali 69 (43); Shaheen Afridi 3/28 (4 overs)		Fakhar Zaman 63 (46); Carlos Brathwaite 3/28 (2.5 overs)

Lahore Qalandars won by 5 wickets
Gaddafi Stadium, Lahore
Attendance: 18,500
Umpires: Aleem Dar (Pak) and Michael Gough (Eng)
Player of the match: Fakhar Zaman (Lahore Qalandars)

- Lahore Qalandars won the toss and elected to field.

Match 25
11 March 2020
19:00 (D/N)
Scorecard

Quetta Gladiators	v	Multan Sultans

Match abandoned
Gaddafi Stadium, Lahore
Umpires: Aleem Dar (Pak) and Asif Yaqoob (Pak)

- No toss.
- No play was possible due to rain.

Match 26
12 March 2020
19:00 (D/N)
Scorecard

Lahore Qalandars; 150/5 (20 overs)	v	Karachi Kings; 151/0 (17.1 overs)
Sohail Akhtar 68 (49); Arshad Iqbal 2/15 (3 overs)		Sharjeel Khan 74* (59)

Karachi Kings won by 10 wickets
National Stadium, Karachi
Umpires: Michael Gough (Eng) and Ahsan Raza (Pak)
Player of the match: Sharjeel Khan (Karachi Kings)

- Karachi Kings won the toss and elected to field.

Match 27
13 March 2020
20:00 (D/N)
Scorecard

Multan Sultans; 154/6 (20 overs)	v	Peshawar Zalmi; 151/7 (20 overs)
Zeeshan Ashraf 52 (39); Rahat Ali 3/24 (4 overs)		Imam-ul-Haq 56 (41); Sohail Tanvir 3/26 (4 overs)

Multan Sultans won by 3 runs
National Stadium, Karachi
Umpires: Michael Gough (Eng) and Rashid Riaz (Pak)
Player of the match: Zeeshan Ashraf (Multan Sultans)

- Peshawar Zalmi won the toss and elected to field.

Match 28
14 March 2020
19:00 (D/N)
Scorecard

Islamabad United; 136/6 (20 overs)	v	Karachi Kings; 137/6 (19.2 overs)
Hussain Talat 37 (30); Iftikhar Ahmed 1/12 (3 overs)		Sharjeel Khan 37 (14); Shadab Khan 2/28 (4 overs)

Karachi Kings won by 4 wickets
National Stadium, Karachi
Umpires: Michael Gough (Eng) and Ahsan Raza (Pak)
Player of the match: Sharjeel Khan (Karachi Kings)

- Karachi Kings won the toss and elected to field.
- Karachi Kings qualified for the ~~semi-finals~~ play-offs. (Note: Due to the COVID-19 pandemic, the matches were reduced from 34 to 33 and the playoffs were replaced by knockouts thus shortening the tournament. However, On 2 September 2020, PCB announced the schedule of the remaining fixtures, going back to the playoffs format.)
- Islamabad United were eliminated from the tournament.

Match 29
15 March 2020
14:00
Scorecard

Multan Sultans; 186/6 (20 overs)	v	Lahore Qalandars; 191/1 (18.5 overs)
Khushdil Shah 70* (29); Shaheen Afridi 2/23 (4 overs)		Chris Lynn 113* (55); Usman Qadir 1/24 (4 overs)

Lahore Qalandars won by 9 wickets
Gaddafi Stadium, Lahore
Umpires: Aleem Dar (Pak) and Shozab Raza (Pak)
Player of the match: Chris Lynn (Lahore Qalandars)

- Lahore Qalandars won the toss and elected to field.
- Lahore Qalandars qualified for the ~~semi-finals~~ play-offs.

Match 30
15 March 2020
19:00 (D/N)
Scorecard

Karachi Kings; 150/5 (20 overs)	v	Quetta Gladiators; 154/5 (16.2 overs)
Cameron Delport 62 (44); Naseem Shah 2/17 (4 overs)		Shane Watson 66 (34); Waqas Maqsood 2/19 (4 overs)

Quetta Gladiators won by 5 wickets
National Stadium, Karachi
Umpires: Michael Gough (Eng) and Rashid Riaz (Pak)
Player of the match: Shane Watson (Quetta Gladiators)

- Karachi Kings won the toss and elected to bat.
- Quetta Gladiators were eliminated from the tournament.
- Peshawar Zalmi qualified for the ~~semi-finals~~ play-offs.

== Playoffs ==
On 2 September 2020, PCB announced the venue and dates for the remaining four matches, with Gaddafi Stadium hosting all four; matches will be held on 14 and 15, with the Final scheduled on 17 November. However, later the matches were shifted to National Stadium in Karachi due to poor air quality in Lahore.

Semifinals
14 November — Karachi
1	Multan Sultans	141/7 (20 overs)
2	Karachi Kings	141/8 (20 overs)
14 November — Karachi
3	Lahore Qalandars	171/5 (19 overs)
4	Peshawar Zalmi	170/9 (20 overs)

Preliminary final
15 November — Karachi
1	Multan Sultans	157 (19.1 overs)
3	Lahore Qalandars	182/6 (20 overs)

Final
17 November — Karachi
2	Karachi Kings	135/5 (18.4 overs)
3	Lahore Qalandars	134/7 (20 overs)

=== Qualifier ===
Match 31
14 November 2020
15:00
Scorecard

Multan Sultans; 141/7 (20 overs)	v	Karachi Kings; 141/8 (20 overs)
Ravi Bopara 40 (31); Arshad Iqbal 2/21 (4 overs)		Babar Azam 65 (53); Sohail Tanvir 3/25 (4 overs)

Match tied
(Karachi Kings won the Super Over)
National Stadium, Karachi
Umpires: Michael Gough (Eng) and Rashid Riaz (Pak)
Player of the match: Babar Azam (Karachi Kings)

- Karachi Kings won the toss and elected to field.
- Super Over: Karachi Kings 13/2 (1 over), Multan Sultans 9/0 (1 over)

=== Eliminators ===
==== Eliminator 1 ====
Match 32
14 November 2020
20:00 (D/N)
Scorecard

Peshawar Zalmi; 170/9 (20 overs)	v	Lahore Qalandars; 171/5 (19 overs)
Shoaib Malik 39 (24); Dilbar Hussain 3/33 (4 overs)		Mohammad Hafeez 74* (46); Saqib Mahmood 3/41 (4 overs)

Lahore Qalandars won by 5 wickets
National Stadium, Karachi
Umpires: Aleem Dar (Pak) and Shozab Raza (Pak)
Player of the match: Mohammad Hafeez (Lahore Qalandars)

- Lahore Qalandars won the toss and elected to field.

==== Eliminator 2 ====
Match 33
15 November 2020
20:00 (D/N)
Scorecard

Lahore Qalandars; 182/6 (20 overs)	v	Multan Sultans; 157 (19.1 overs)
David Wiese 48* (21); Shahid Afridi 2/18 (4 overs)		Adam Lyth 50 (29); David Wiese 3/27 (4 overs)

Lahore Qalandars won by 25 runs
National Stadium, Karachi
Umpires: Aleem Dar (Pak) and Michael Gough (Eng)
Player of the match: David Wiese (Lahore Qalandars)

- Multan Sultans won the toss and elected to field.

=== Final ===
Match 34
17 November 2020
20:00 (D/N)
Scorecard

Lahore Qalandars; 134/7 (20 overs)	v	Karachi Kings; 135/5 (18.4 overs)
Tamim Iqbal 35 (38); Waqas Maqsood 2/18 (4 overs); Umaid Asif 2/18 (4 overs)		Babar Azam 63* (49); Dilbar Hussain 2/28 (4 overs)

Karachi Kings won by 5 wickets
National Stadium, Karachi
Umpires: Aleem Dar (Pak) and Michael Gough (Eng)
Player of the match: Babar Azam (Karachi Kings)

- Lahore Qalandars won the toss and elected to bat.
- Karachi Kings are the Champion of HBL PSL 2020 (1st Title)

== Awards and statistics ==
=== Most runs ===
Player	Team	Mat	Inns	Runs	HS
Babar Azam	Karachi Kings	12	11	473	78
Fakhar Zaman	Lahore Qalandars	12	12	325	63
Mohammad Hafeez	Lahore Qalandars	13	12	312	98*
Ben Dunk	Lahore Qalandars	11	10	300	99*
Chris Lynn	Lahore Qalandars	8	8	284	113*
Source: ESPNcricinfo.com, Last updated: 18 November 2020

- Babar Azam of Karachi Kings received the Green Cap.

=== Most wickets ===
Player	Team	Mat	Inns	Wkts	BBI
Shaheen Afridi	Lahore Qalandars	12	12	17	4/18
Mohammad Hasnain	Quetta Gladiators	9	9	15	4/25
Sohail Tanvir	Multan Sultans	10	9	14	4/13
Dilbar Hussain	Lahore Qalandars	11	10	14	4/24
David Wiese	Lahore Qalandars	11	10	12	3/27
Source: ESPNcricinfo.com, Last updated: 18 November 2020

- Shaheen Afridi of Lahore Qalandars received the Maroon Cap.
