= Fawad Rana =

Pakistani businessman

- Born: Lahore, Punjab, Pakistan
- Occupation: Businessman
- Known for: Owner of the Lahore Qalandars

Fawad Naeem Rana is a Pakistani businessman who owns Lahore Qalandars, a cricket team based in Lahore, Pakistan and plays in Pakistan Super League. He is also the managing director of Doha-based QALCO. He and his team Lahore Qalandar introduced PDP (Player Development Program) that discovered players like Shaheen Afridi, Haris Rauf, Zaman Khan, Salman Irshad, Danyal Ahmed and Muhammad Naeem who are now a prominent name in Pakistan Cricket.
