= Abdul Nasir (Balochistan cricketer) =

Pakistani cricketer (born 1998)

Personal information
- Born: 25 December 1998 (age 27); Quetta, Balochistan, Pakistan
- Batting: Right-handed
- Bowling: Right-arm off break
- Role: Bowler

Domestic team information
- Years: Team
- 2020: Quetta Gladiators (squad no. 23)
- Source: ESPNcricinfo, 21 February 2020

Abdul Nasir (born 25 December 1998) is a Pakistani cricketer. He made his Twenty20 debut on 20 February 2020, for Quetta Gladiators in the 2020 Pakistan Super League.

== Early life ==
Abdul Nasir was born on 25 December 1998 in Quetta, Balochistan, Pakistan.
