= Aamir Ali (cricketer) =

Pakistani cricketer (born 2002)

Aamir Ali Thaheem
Personal information
- Born: 5 May 2002 (age 23); Dadu, Pakistan
- Batting: Right-handed
- Bowling: Slow left-arm orthodox
- Role: Bowler

Domestic team information
- Years: Team
- 2019–: Sindh
- 2020: Peshawar Zalmi
- Source: Cricinfo, 22 February 2020

Aamir Ali Thaheem (born 5 May 2002) is a Pakistani cricketer. He made his first-class debut on 18 November 2019, for Sindh in the 2019–20 Quaid-e-Azam Trophy. In December 2019, he was drafted by the Pakistan Super League (PSL) franchise Peshawar Zalmi in Emerging category during the 2020 PSL draft. In December 2019, he was named in Pakistan's squad for the 2020 Under-19 Cricket World Cup.

== Early life ==
Aamir Ali was born in Dadu in Sindhi family.
