= 2020 Pakistan Super League final =

Cricket match

2020 Pakistan Super League Final
- Event: 2020 Pakistan Super League
Lahore Qalandars	Karachi Kings
134/7	135/5
20 overs	18.4 overs
- Karachi Kings won by 5 wickets
- Date: 17 November 2020
- Venue: National Stadium, Karachi
- Player of the match: Babar Azam (Karachi Kings)
- Umpires: Aleem Dar; Michael Gough

The 2020 Pakistan Super League Final was a Twenty20 cricket match played on 17 November 2020 at the National Stadium in Karachi, Pakistan, between Karachi Kings and Lahore Qalandars to determine the winner of the 2020 Pakistan Super League (PSL). Karachi Kings defeated Lahore Qalandars by five wickets to win their maiden PSL title.

The match was originally planned to be played on 22 March 2020 at the Gaddafi Stadium in Lahore, Pakistan. Due to the 2020 coronavirus outbreak in Pakistan, the final was rescheduled from 22 March to 18 March.

In mid-March, the Pakistan Cricket Board (PCB) had indefinitely suspended the four remaining games of the 2020 PSL season due to the COVID-19 pandemic. In September, the PCB announced new dates for the remaining fixtures, with the final to be held on 17 November 2020 at the same venue. In late October, it was announced that the venue had been shifted from Gaddafi Stadium in Lahore to the National Stadium in Karachi, due to poor air quality amid smog in Lahore at that time of the year.

== Route to the Final ==
During the group stage of the 2020 Pakistan Super League each team played ten matches, two against each of the other sides contesting the competition. All matches were played in Pakistan. The top four teams progressed to the playoff stage. Karachi Kings finished the group stage in second position with 11 points by winning five of their matches, losing four and one ending in a no result. Lahore Qalandars finished the group stage in third position with 10 points by winning and losing five matches each.

Karachi Kings reached the finals for the first time in PSL history after defeating Multan Sultans in the qualifier match that went into a Super Over.

In Eliminator 1, Lahore Qalandars chased down 171 and winning the match by five wickets to knock out Peshawar Zalmi. In Eliminator 2, Lahore Qalandars defeated Multan Sultans by 25 runs to progress to the final.

Lahore Qalandars reached the playoffs and the final for the first time in their history.

=== League stage matches ===
8 March 2020 (D/N)

Karachi Kings; 187/5 (20 overs)	v	Lahore Qalandars; 190/2 (19.1 overs)

Lahore Qalandars won by 8 wickets
Gaddafi Stadium, Lahore

12 March 2020 (D/N)

Lahore Qalandars; 150/5 (20 overs)	v	Karachi Kings; 151/0 (17.1 overs)

Karachi Kings won by 10 wickets
National Stadium, Karachi

=== Playoff matches ===
==== Qualifier ====
14 November 2020

Multan Sultans; 141/7 (20 overs)	v	Karachi Kings; 141/8 (20 overs)

Match tied
(Karachi Kings won the Super Over)
National Stadium, Karachi

==== Eliminators ====
===== Eliminator 1 =====
14 November 2020 (D/N)

Peshawar Zalmi; 170/9 (20 overs)	v	Lahore Qalandars; 171/5 (19 overs)

Lahore Qalandars won by 5 wickets
National Stadium, Karachi

===== Eliminator 2 =====
15 November 2020 (D/N)

Lahore Qalandars; 182/6 (20 overs)	v	Multan Sultans; 157 (19.1 overs)

Lahore Qalandars won by 25 runs
National Stadium, Karachi

== Match ==
=== Summary ===
The final was played on 17 November between the Karachi Kings and Lahore Qalandars at Karachi's National Stadium. The clash was described as "undoubtedly the biggest match in the league's history, pitting Pakistan's two major cities against one another". It was the first time for both teams to have qualified for the PSL final. The occasion was particularly special for Karachi, as they paid tribute to their Australian coach Dean Jones who died in September. Lahore's trajectory was compared by Sky Sports to that of Leicester City in the 2015–16 Premier League, having struggled and finished last in all previous PSL editions, only to become potential champions in the 2020 season.

==== Lahore Qalandars innings ====
Lahore won the toss and elected to bat first. Fakhar Zaman and Tamim Iqbal formed a slow but steady 68-run opening partnership off the first ten overs, until both Tamim and Fakhar were dismissed in the 11th over by Umaid Asif, holing out catches to Iftikhar Ahmed. Lahore's key middle order batsmen including Mohammad Hafeez, Ben Dunk, Samit Patel and skipper Sohail Akhtar failed to make an impact, as Lahore faced a batting collapse and lost seven wickets for only 50 runs. David Wiese and Shaheen Afridi finished the innings, taking the total to 135.

==== Karachi Kings innings ====
Karachi had a stable start, until Sharjeel Khan was dismissed by Patel in the fourth over via a catch to Fakhar. Alex Hales was bowled by Dilbar Hussain in the seventh over, with the scoreboard reading 49 runs. Wicketkeeper-batsman Chadwick Walton formed a crucial 61-run partnership off 8.1 overs with opener and star performer Babar Azam, until he too was dismissed LBW by Dilbar in the 16th over. Iftikhar and Sherfane Rutherford were caught and dismissed in consecutive deliveries at the start of the 18th over by Haris Rauf, with 124 runs added to the scoreboard and Karachi needing only 11 runs to win off 16 deliveries. Babar and captain Imad Wasim took Karachi over the line, with the latter hitting the winning stroke in the 19th over to take Karachi to a five-wicket victory with eight balls to spare, and the team's inaugural title. Babar Azam was adjudged man of the match for his half century and standout performance, hitting 63 runs off 49 balls including seven boundaries, at a strike rate of 128.57.

== Scorecard ==
keys:

- † indicates team captain
- * indicates not out

Toss: Lahore Qalandars won the toss and elected to bat.

Result: Karachi Kings won by 5 wickets

Lahore Qalandars innings
Player	Status	Runs	Balls	4s	6s	Strike rate
Tamim Iqbal	c Iftikhar Ahmed b Umaid Asif	35	38	4	1	92.10
Fakhar Zaman	c Iftikhar Ahmed b Umaid Asif	27	24	4	0	112.50
Mohammed Hafeez	c Babar Azam b Imad Wasim	2	4	0	0	50.00
Ben Dunk	c Babar Azam b Arshad Iqbal	11	14	1	0	78.57
Samit Patel	c Waqas Maqsood b Arshad Iqbal	5	8	0	0	62.50
Sohail Akhtar†	c Rutherford b Waqas Maqsood	14	14	1	0	0.00
David Wiese	*	14	14	1	0	100.00
Muhammad Faizan	c Iftikhar Ahmed b Waqas Maqsood	0	1	0	0	0.00
Shaheen Afridi	*	12	4	1	1	300.00
Haris Rauf	did not bat					
Dilbar Hussain	did not bat					
Extras 14 (lb 9, nb 1, wd 4); Total 134/7 (20 overs)				12	2	6.7 RR

Fall of wickets: 1-68 (Tamim Iqbal, 10.1 overs), 2-69 (Fakhar Zaman, 10.4 overs), 3-70 (Mohammad Hafeez, 11.1 overs), 4-81 (Samit Patel, 13.3 overs), 5-97 (Ben Dunk, 15.4 overs), 6-110 (Sohail Akhtar, 18.1 overs), 7-118 (Muhammad Faizan, 18.5 overs),

Karachi Kings bowling
Bowler	Overs	Maidens	Runs	Wickets	Econ	Wides	NBs
Imad Wasim	2	0	6	1	3.00	0	0
Mohammad Amir	4	0	38	0	9.50	2	0
Waqas Maqsood	4	0	18	2	4.50	1	1
Arshad Iqbal	4	0	26	2	6.50	1	0
Umaid Asif	4	0	18	2	4.50	0	0
Iftikhar Ahmed	2	0	19	0	9.50	0	0

Target: 135 runs from 20 overs at 6.75 RR

Karachi Kings innings
Player	Status	Runs	Balls	4s	6s	Strike rate
Sharjeel Khan	c Fakhar Zaman b Samit Patel	13	12	2	0	108.33
Babar Azam	*	63	49	7	0	128.57
Alex Hales	b Dilbar Hussain	11	11	1	0	100.00
Chadwick Walton	lbw b Dilbar Hussain	22	27	1	0	81.48
Iftikhar Ahmed	c Wiese b Haris Rauf	4	6	0	0	66.67
Sherfane Rutherford	c Sohail Akhtar b Haris Rauf	0	1	0	0	0.00
Imad Wasim†	*	10	7	2	0	142.86
Umaid Asif	did not bat					
Mohammad Amir	did not bat					
Waqas Maqsood	did not bat					
Arshad Iqbal	did not bat					
Extras 12 (lb3, wd8, nb1); Total 135/5 (18.4 overs)				13	0	7.23 RR

Fall of wickets:1-23 (Sharjeel Khan, 3.1 overs), 2-49 (Alex Hales, 6.5 overs), 3-110 (Chadwick Walton, 15.1 overs), 4-124 (Iftikhar Ahmed, 17.1 overs), 5-124 (Sherfane Rutherford, 17.2 overs)

Lahore Qalandars bowling
Bowler	Overs	Maidens	Runs	Wickets	Econ	Wides	NBs
Shaheen Afridi	3.4	0	31	0	8.50	0	0
Haris Rauf	4	0	30	2	7.50	1	0
Samit Patel	4	0	22	1	5.50	1	0
Dilbar Hussain	4	0	28	2	7.00	1	1
David Wiese	3	0	21	0	7.00	1	0

== Match Officials ==
Role	Name
On field Umpire	(Pakistan) Aleem Dar
On field Umpire	(England) Michael Gough
TV Umpire	(Pakistan) Ahsan Raza
Reserve Umpire	(Pakistan) Rashid Riaz
Match Referee	(Pakistan) Mohammed Anees
