= Royal Palm Golf and Country Club =

Golf course and Club in Lahore, Punjab, Pakistan

- Native name: آر پی جی سی سی RPGCC
- Type: Golf Course and Social Club Complex
- Headquarters: Canal Bank Road, Lahore, Pakistan

The Royal Palm Golf and Country Club (RPGCC) is a golf course and social club complex in Lahore, Punjab, Pakistan. It is located on the Canal Bank Road in Lahore. It was previously owned by the Pakistan Railways and called the Pakistan Railways Golf Club. In 2001, the club was sold by Pakistan Railways to the current management and renamed as the Royal Palm Golf and Country Club. It is a national and international sports venue. As of 2013, membership cost the equivalent of 2,212,041 Pakistani Rupees.

== See also ==
- List of sports venues in Lahore
