= Dilbar Hussain =

Pakistani cricketer (born 1993)

Personal information
- Born: 20 February 1993 (age 33); Faisalabad, Punjab, Pakistan
- Batting: Right-handed
- Bowling: Right-arm fast-medium
- Role: Bowling all-rounder

Domestic team information
- Years: Team
- 2020: Melbourne Stars
- 2023-present: Lahore Qalandars
- 2020–21: Southern Punjab

Career statistics
Competition	FC	T20
Matches	1	18
Runs scored	0	29
Batting average	0.00	29.00
100s/50s	0/0	0/0
Top score	0	13*
Balls bowled	186	332
Wickets	3	21
Bowling average	43.00	23.95
5 wickets in innings	0	0
10 wickets in match	0	0
Best bowling	2/39	4/24
Catches/stumpings	1/0	3/0
- Source: Cricinfo, 4 October 2021

Dilbar Hussain (born 20 February 1993) is a Pakistani cricketer. He made his Twenty20 debut on 25 January 2020, for the Melbourne Stars in the 2019–20 Big Bash League season. He was brought into the team's squad as a replacement for Haris Rauf, who was called up for international duty with Pakistan.

He was part of the Lahore Qalandars' Players Development Program squad after previously working on agricultural land in his village near Faisalabad. He impressed Qalandars coach Aaqib Javed in his first hard-ball game in Faisalabad, Punjab in 2018 and toured Australia with the Qalandars development squad in the same year. He made his first-class debut on 31 October 2020, for Southern Punjab, in the 2020–21 Quaid-e-Azam Trophy.

== Early life ==
Born in a village of Tehsil Jaranwala Faisalabad District, Punjab, Pakistan, he used to work on his agricultural land there before getting his first professional cricket contract. His father is a farmer.
