= Lahore Qalandars =

Lahore-based cricket franchise in the Pakistan Super League

- لاہور قلندرز
- League: Pakistan Super League

Personnel
- Captain: Shaheen Afridi
- Coach: Dion Ebrahim
- Batting coach: Amjad Ali
- Bowling coach: Kashif Raza
- Owner: Fawad Rana

Team information
- City: Lahore, Punjab, Pakistan
- Founded: 2015; 11 years ago
- Home ground: Gaddafi Stadium
- Capacity: 35,000

History
- Pakistan Super League wins: 3 (2022, 2023 & 2025)
- Official website: lahoreqalandars.com
Home kit
Away kit

The Lahore Qalandars (Note: Punjabi: لہور قلندرز; Urdu: لاہور قلندرز) are a professional Twenty20 franchise cricket team that competes in the Pakistan Super League (PSL). The team is based in Lahore, the capital of Punjab. Team's home ground is the Gaddafi Stadium. The franchise is owned by the Rana brothers.

Formed in 2015, Lahore Qalandars was the second-most expensive franchise sold during the inaugural PSL team auction and one of the few purchased by an international group. The team struggled in its early seasons, finishing at the bottom of the table five times, but later emerged as one of the league's most successful teams, winning titles in 2022, 2023, and 2025.

The team is currently captained by Shaheen Afridi and coached by Dion Ebrahim. Fakhar Zaman is the team’s leading run-scorer, while Shaheen Afridi is the leading wicket-taker.

== Franchise history ==
In 2015, the Pakistan Cricket Board (PCB) announced that the inaugural season of the Pakistan Super League (PSL) would be held in February 2016 in the United Arab Emirates. On 3 December 2015, the PCB revealed the owners of the five city-based franchises. The Lahore franchise was purchased by Kausar Rana Resources Private Limited for US$25.1 million over a ten-year period, making it the second-most expensive team after the Karachi Kings at the time. Following the introduction of the Multan Sultans in 2018, sold for approximately US$41.6 million, Lahore Qalandars became the third most expensive PSL franchise.

In November 2025, the franchise renewed its rights for another ten-year period (2026–2035) with the PCB. The renewal was part of a league-wide re-evaluation conducted by Ernst & Young, which shifted the financial model from US dollars to Pakistani Rupees. Under the new terms, the annual franchise fee for Lahore Qalandars was set at Rs. 670 million, making it the most expensive franchise in the league's history.

In 2016, under the Lahore Qalandars Players Development Program (PDP), the franchise launched the "Jazz Rising Stars" talent hunt across eight Pakistani cities to identify emerging cricketers. Selected players were sent to Australia to train with the Sydney Thunder, while the top two performers were awarded the opportunity to play for the Qalandars. During the program, an ambidextrous fast bowler, Yasir Jan, was discovered by former Pakistan pacer Aqib Javed.

In January 2026, the ownership of the franchise became the subject of a legal dispute within the Rana family. An arbitration tribunal ruled that the transfer of majority shares from Qatar Lubricants Company (QALCO), controlled by Fawad Rana, to his younger brothers Atif Naeem Rana and Sameen Naeem Rana was void and lacked proper authorization. The tribunal ordered either the return of management control to Fawad Rana's company or payment of approximately Rs.2.3 billion in lieu of his shares within 45 days. A Lahore tribunal subsequently restored control of the franchise to Fawad Rana, ending the prolonged ownership dispute.

== Performance in PSL ==
=== 2016 season ===
In the inaugural Pakistan Super League season, Lahore Qalandars drafted notable players including Chris Gayle, Umar Akmal, Dwayne Bravo, Azhar Ali, and Yasir Shah. The team struggled for consistency, winning only two of their eight group matches, and finished last in the standings. Despite this, Umar Akmal emerged as the tournament's top run-scorer with 335 runs in seven innings, earning the "Best Batsman" award. Lahore Qalandars also received the “Spirit of the Game” and “Fair Play” awards for their sportsmanship during the tournament.

=== 2017 season ===
Ahead of the 2017 season, Lahore Qalandars traded Chris Gayle to Karachi Kings for Sohail Tanvir and swapped Sohaib Maqsood for Aamer Yamin from Peshawar Zalmi. The franchise appointed former New Zealand captain Brendon McCullum as team captain for the new season.

Lahore's campaign was inconsistent, highlighted by wins against defending champions Islamabad United and rivals Karachi Kings, but also marred by collapses such as being bowled out for 59 against Peshawar Zalmi. They finished the group stage at the bottom of the points table for a second consecutive year, failing to qualify for the playoffs.

=== 2018 season ===
Lahore Qalandars began the 2018 Pakistan Super League season with three consecutive defeats against Multan Sultans, Quetta Gladiators, and Karachi Kings, suffering repeated batting collapses in each game.

Their fortunes did not improve in Sharjah, where they lost a Super Over thriller against Islamabad United after tying the match on the final ball. A ten-wicket loss to Peshawar Zalmi, the first such result in PSL history, confirmed their early elimination from playoff contention.

Later in 2018, the Qalandars represented the PSL in the inaugural Abu Dhabi T20 Trophy, where they defeated Titans in the final to win the tournament.

=== 2019 season ===
Ahead of the 2019 PSL season, Lahore Qalandars overhauled their squad, drafting several international stars including AB de Villiers, Mohammad Hafeez, Corey Anderson, David Wiese, Sandeep Lamichhane, Brendan Taylor, and Carlos Brathwaite.

The team began under the captaincy of Mohammad Hafeez, who was later ruled out due to a fractured thumb sustained during their second match. Leadership subsequently rotated between AB de Villiers and Fakhar Zaman. Despite flashes of promise, including standout performances by Wiese and Lamichhane, Lahore Qalandars again finished last in the standings, winning only three of their ten matches and failed to qualify for the playoffs.

=== 2020 season ===
In the 2020 PSL, Lahore Qalandars reached the playoffs for the first time in the franchise's history, having finished at the bottom of the table in all previous editions. The team ended the league stage in fourth place, securing a playoff berth for the first time.

In the playoffs, Lahore defeated Peshawar Zalmi by five wickets in the Eliminator 1, with David Wiese playing a key finishing role. They then beat Multan Sultans in Eliminator 2 to advance to their maiden final. In the final, played against Karachi Kings, Lahore Qalandars were restricted to 134/7 in their 20 overs, with Karachi chasing down the target by five wickets. Babar Azam’s unbeaten 63 guided Karachi Kings to their maiden PSL title.

=== 2021 season ===
Lahore Qalandars began the 2021 PSL strongly with consecutive wins over Peshawar Zalmi and Quetta Gladiators. The league was later postponed due to the COVID-19 pandemic and resumed in Abu Dhabi in June. Lahore added James Faulkner and Tim David to their squad and briefly topped the table before losing their final four matches. They finished fifth with five wins and five losses, missing out on the playoffs.

=== 2022 season ===
Lahore Qalandars began their 2022 PSL campaign with a narrow loss to Multan Sultans despite scoring over 200 runs. They rebounded with wins over Karachi Kings, Peshawar Zalmi and Islamabad United, driven by consistent batting performances from Fakhar Zaman and strong death bowling from Zaman Khan. They finished second in the league stage and advanced to the playoffs, defeating Islamabad United in the Eliminator 2 to reach their second PSL final. In the final, they beat Multan Sultans by 42 runs to win their maiden PSL title, with Mohammad Hafeez starring with both bat and ball.

=== 2023 season ===
2023 PSL as defending champions under Shaheen Afridi's captaincy, Lahore Qalandars retained most of their core squad from 2022, including Fakhar Zaman, Haris Rauf, and Rashid Khan. They topped the league stage with seven wins in ten matches, registering notable victories such as a record 110-run win over Islamabad United and a last-ball triumph against Multan Sultans.

After losing the Qualifier to Multan Sultans, Lahore bounced back with a win over Peshawar Zalmi in Eliminator 2 to reach their second consecutive final. In the final, they defeated Multan Sultans by one run, the narrowest margin in PSL final history, with Shaheen Afridi starring for his 44* (15) and 4 wickets, while Zaman Khan defended 12 runs in the last over.

With the win, Lahore became the first franchise in PSL history to defend their title successfully, while Fakhar Zaman finished as the team's top run-scorer, earning the Hanif Mohammad Cap for the second consecutive season.

=== 2024 season ===
Lahore Qalandars entered the 2024 Pakistan Super League as defending champions under Shaheen Shah Afridi, aiming for a third consecutive title. However, the season proved to be their worst in PSL history, as they won only one of ten matches and finished last with three points.

Despite retaining key players like Fakhar Zaman, Haris Rauf, and David Wiese, the team struggled in all departments. The absence of Rashid Khan due to injury weakened their bowling attack, while fielding lapses and inconsistent performances led to several narrow defeats, including losses against Islamabad United, Quetta Gladiators, and Karachi Kings.

=== 2025 season ===
Lahore Qalandars won their third Pakistan Super League title in four years (2022, 2023, 2025), equalling Islamabad United as the most successful team in the competition's history. The team had a mixed start to the season, losing their opening match to Islamabad United before recording comprehensive victories over Quetta Gladiators and Karachi Kings. Despite the unavailability of overseas players such as Daryl Mitchell and Sam Billings, Lahore finished the league stage in the top four, led by Shaheen Shah Afridi, Fakhar Zaman, and Abdullah Shafique. In the playoffs, they defeated Karachi in the Eliminator and Islamabad in Qualifier 2 to reach the final. On 25 May 2025 at the Gaddafi Stadium, Lahore chased down 202 runs to beat Quetta Gladiators by six wickets, with Kusal Perera scoring an unbeaten 62 and Afridi taking three wickets. The win marked a strong recovery following their bottom-place finish in the previous season.

== Team identity ==
The Lahore franchise was launched on 12 December 2015 by owner Fawad Rana. The "Q" in the Qalandars was linked to both represent both Qatar and QALCO and Rana added that the name was chosen to highlight the Sufi culture of Lahore – "Qalandar" is a common term used in Pakistan to describe Sufi mystics or saints whose shrines attract millions of devotees and tourists. The team's logo features a Sufi performing the famous Sufi whirling with three stumps to his right and a cricket ball as the base, and is meant to represent the Sufi culture of the region The Qalandars' kit colors in the first season were red and black. Ahead of the second season, Qalandars launched new kits, with the red being changed to green.

=== Ambassadors ===
Film star Shaan was the team's brand ambassador from 2016 to the 2018 season.

Since 2019, Shaheen Afridi has been the brand ambassador.

=== Anthems ===
The anthem of the team in 2016 season was "Dama Dam Mast" released in two versions; one by Asrar and other by Nabeel Shaukat Ali. The official song for 2017 season "Dama Dam Mast Lahore Qalandars" was sung by Shafqat Amanat Ali.

=== Sponsors ===
Mobilink was the team's first shirt sponsor and the title sponsor. Alkaram, a textile mill situated in Karachi, was announced as another sponsor and the media partner of the team is Geo TV. Royal Palm is the team's hospitality partner.

Year	Kit manufacturer	Shirt sponsor (front)	Shirt sponsor (back)	Chest branding	Sleeve branding
2016	Millat Sports	Jazz	Al-Karam Textiles	Geo News	QALCO, Mobilink
2017	Millat Sports	Jazz	Al-Karam Textiles	Geo News	QALCO, Huawei, Royal Palm
2018	Millat Sports	Ecostar	Gree	Geo News	Bank of Punjab, ZXMCO, Royal Palm
2019	Millat Sports	Ecostar	Mughal Steel	Geo News	QALCO, Lays
2020	Millat Sports	Ecostar	Hashmi Ispaghol	Geo News	Mughal Steel
2021	Millat Sports	B4U Cabs	Bravo Super Market	Geo News	Mughal Steel, Revolt
2022		Marina Sports City	Al Jalil Garden	Mughal Steel	Bank of Punjab, AirSial, Kausar Rana Trust
2023		Qalandars City	MELBET	Mughal Steel	Bank of Punjab, AirSial
2024	Gym Armour	Pakistan State Oil	Lahore Entertainment City	Mughal Steel	Bank of Punjab, AirSial, Kausar Rana Trust
2025	Grip Active	Smog Free Punjab	Al-Fatah	Mughal Steel	Bank of Punjab, AirSial, RUDA

=== Rivalry ===
Qalandars have an active rivalry with Karachi Kings, and is considered to be the biggest rivalry in the PSL due to their historic economic and cultural rivalry. As of 2021 season, both teams have played against each other 14 times, with Qalandars coming out victorious in 6 of them. Both teams have a large fan following which makes their matches more intense and interesting to watch. Both teams are known to be the most expensive teams of PSL.

They have a provincial rivalry with the second team from Punjab, the Multan Sultans. The matches between the two are known as 'The Punjab Derby'.

== Current squad ==
Key
- Players with international caps are listed in **bold**.
- * denotes a player who is fully unavailable.
- * denotes a player who will be partially unavailable.

No.	Name	Nationality	Birth date	Salary (PKR)	Batting style	Bowling style	Year signed	Notes
Batsmen
57	**Abdullah Shafique**	Pakistan	20 November 1999 (age 26)	PKR 2.20 crore	Right-handed	Right-arm offbreak	2022	
20	Muhammad Naeem	Pakistan	10 April 1999 (age 27)	PKR 70 Lakh	Right-handed	Right-arm offbreak	2025	
39	**Fakhar Zaman**	Pakistan	10 April 1990 (age 36)	PKR 7.95 crore	Left-handed	Slow left-arm orthodox	2017	
45	**Asif Ali**	Pakistan	1 October 1991 (age 35)	PKR 60 lakh	Right-handed	Right-arm medium	2026	
66	**Tayyab Tahir**	Pakistan	26 July 1993 (age 33)	PKR 60 lakh	Right-handed	Right-arm off break	2026	
12	**Parvez Hossain Emon**	Bangladesh	12 June 2002 (age 24)	PKR 60 lakh	Left-handed	—	2026	
100	Mohammad Farooq	Pakistan	4 March 2004 (age 22)	PKR 60 lakh	Right-handed	—	2026	
Wicket-Keepers
53	**Haseebullah Khan**	Pakistan	20 March 2003 (age 23)	PKR 1.1 crore	Left-handed	—	2026	
83	**Rubin Hermann**	South Africa	26 January 1997 (age 29)	PKR 60 lakh	Left-handed	—	2026	
All-rounders
24	**Sikandar Raza**	Zimbabwe	24 April 1986 (age 40)	PKR 2.80 crore	Right-handed	Right-arm offbreak	2023	
9	**Dunith Wellalage**	Sri Lanka	9 January 2003 (age 23)	PKR 60 lakh	Left-handed	Slow left arm orthodox	2026	
95	**Daniel Sams**	Australia	27 October 1992 (age 34)	PKR 2.20 crore	Right-handed	Left-arm fast-medium	2026	
54	**Ryan Burl**	Zimbabwe	15 April 1994 (age 32)	PKR 60 lakh	Left-handed	Right-arm leg break	2026	
Bowlers
10	**Shaheen Afridi**	Pakistan	6 April 2000 (age 26)	PKR 7.0 crore	Left-handed	Left-arm fast	2018	Captain
90	**Mustafizur Rahman**	Bangladesh	6 September 1995 (age 31)	PKR 6.44 crore	Left-handed	Left-arm fast-medium	2026	
97	**Haris Rauf**	Pakistan	7 November 1993 (age 33)	PKR 7.60 crore	Right-handed	Right-arm fast	2026	
23	**Usama Mir**	Pakistan	23 December 1995 (age 30)	PKR 3.5 crore	Right-handed	Right-arm leg break	2026	
73	Ubaid Shah	Pakistan	4 February 2006 (age 20)	PKR 2.70 crore	Right-handed	Right-arm fast	2026	
55	Maaz Khan	Pakistan	1 March 2003 (age 23)	PKR 60 lakh	Right-handed	Right-arm leg spin	2026	
47	Shahab Khan	Pakistan	N/A	PKR 60 lakh	Left-handed	Left-arm medium-fast	2026	

- Source: ESPNcricinfo

== Management and coaching staff ==
Name	Position
Sameena Rana	Owner & CEO
Russell Domingo	Head coach
Farooq Anwar	Assistant Team Manager
Amjad Ali	Batting coach
Kashif Raza	Bowling coach
Shehzad Butt	Fielding coach
Timroy Allen	Power-hitting coach
Hiten Maisuria	Physiotherapist
Waseef Khalid Khan	Data analyst
Aminul Islam Bulbul	Associate Advisor
Rehan Ashraf Chohan	Masseur

== Captains ==
Name	From	To	Mat	Won	Lost	Tie+W	Tie+L	NR	Win(%)
(Pakistan) Azhar Ali	2016	2016	7	2	5	0	0	0	28.57
(Cricket West Indies) Dwayne Bravo	2016	2016	1	0	1	0	0	0	0.00
(New Zealand) Brendon McCullum	2017	2018	18	5	11	1	1	0	33.33
(Pakistan) Mohammad Hafeez	2019	2019	2	1	1	0	0	0	50.00
(South Africa) AB de Villiers	2019	2019	3	1	2	0	0	0	33.33
(Pakistan) Fakhar Zaman	2019	2019	5	1	4	0	0	0	20.00
(Pakistan) Sohail Akhtar	2020	2021	23	12	11	0	0	0	52.17
(Pakistan) Shaheen Afridi	2022	present	47	26	19	0	1	0	57.52
(Namibia) David Wiese	2023	2023	1	0	1	0	0	0	0.00

Source: ESPNcricinfo, Last updated: 12 March 2024

== Result summary ==
=== Overall result in PSL ===
Year	Pld	Won	Lost	Tie	NR	Position	Summary
2016	8	2	6	0	0	5/5	League Stage
2017	8	3	5	0	0	5/5	League Stage
2018	10	3	7	0	0	6/6	League Stage
2019	10	3	7	0	0	6/6	League Stage
2020	10	5	5	0	0	3/6	Runners-up
2021	10	5	5	0	0	5/6	League Stage
2022	10	6	4	0	0	2/6	Champions
2023	10	7	3	0	0	1/6	Champions
2024	10	1	8	0	1	6/6	League Stage
2025	10	5	4	0	1	4/6	Champions
Total	96	40	54	0	2	3 Titles	

=== Performance Visuals ===
League Position by Season
1st										
2nd										
4th										
6th										
	'16	'17	'18	'19	'20	'21	'22	'23	'24	'25

Win/Loss Ratio (2016-2025)
■ Wins	41.7%
■ Losses	56.2%
■ N/R	2.1%

== Head-to-head record ==
Head-to-head record
Opposition	Span	Mat	Won	Lost	Tie	NR	SR (%)
Pakistan Super League Teams
Islamabad United	2016–present	23	11	11	1	0	47.82
Karachi Kings	2016–present	22	7	14	1	0	31.81
Multan Sultans	2018–present	23	11	12	0	0	47.82
Peshawar Zalmi	2016–present	23	10	12	1	0	43.47
Quetta Gladiators	2016–present	22	11	11	0	0	50.00
Non-PSL Teams
Guyana Amazon Warriors	2024	1	0	1	0	0	0.00
Hobart Hurricanes	2018	1	1	0	0	0	100.00
Marylebone Cricket Club	2020	1	0	1	0	0	0.00
Titans	2018	1	1	0	0	0	100.00
Yorkshire	2018	1	1	0	0	0	100.00
Hampshire	2024	1	1	0	0	0	100.00
Victoria	2024	1	1	0	0	0	100.00
Rangpur Riders	2024	1	0	1	0	0	0.00

Success Visualization (LQ vs All)
IU	KK	MS	PZ	QG
GAW	HH	MCC	Titans	Yorks
■ Lahore Qalandars Won ■ Opposition Won (Team Colors Used)

Source: ESPNcricinfo, Last updated: 22 February 2026

== Statistics ==
As of 22 February 2026

=== Most runs ===
Player	Years	Innings	Runs	Highest score
Fakhar Zaman	2017–2025	98	3,009	115
Abdullah Shafique	2022–2025	39	1,068	75
Sohail Akhtar	2018–2022	46	1,041	100
Mohammad Hafeez	2019–2022	38	925	98*
David Wiese	2019–2025	45	624	48*

Most Runs (2026 View)
3009	1068	1041	925	624
Fakhar	Abdullah	Sohail	Hafeez	Wiese

- Source: ESPNcricinfo

=== Most wickets ===
Player	Years	Innings	Wickets	Best bowling
Shaheen Afridi	2018–2025	86	127	5/4
Haris Rauf	2018–2025	71	85	4/23
Zaman Khan	2022–2025	39	45	4/16
Rashid Khan	2021–2023	28	44	5/20
David Wiese	2019–2025	52	38	3/17

Most Wickets (2026 View)
127	85	45	44	38
Shaheen	Rauf	Zaman	Rashid	Wiese

- Source: ESPNcricinfo
