= 2024 Karachi Kings season =

2024 season of Karachi Kings

Karachi Kings
2024 season
- Coach: Phil Simmons
- Captain: Shan Masood
- Ground(s): National Stadium
- PSL 2024: League stage
- Most runs: Shoaib Malik (254)
- Most wickets: Hasan Ali (14)

Karachi Kings is a franchise cricket team that represents Karachi in the Pakistan Super League (PSL). They were one of the six teams that were competing in the 2024 Pakistan Super League. The team was coached by Phil Simmons, and captained by Shan Masood. Wasim Akram was the president of Karachi Kings.

== Squad ==
- Players with international caps are listed in **bold**.
- Ages are given as of 17 February 2024, the date of the first match in the tournament.

No.	Name	Nationality	Birth date	Category	Batting style	Bowling style	Year signed	Notes
Batters
14	**James Vince**	England	14 March 1991 (aged 32)	Diamond	Right-handed	Right-arm medium	2023	Vice-captain
75	Irfan Khan	Pakistan	28 December 2002 (aged 21)	Emerging	Right-handed	Right-arm medium-fast	2023	
76	Leus du Plooy	South Africa	12 January 1995 (aged 29)	Supplementary	Left-handed	Left-arm orthodox	2024	
94	**Shan Masood**	Pakistan	14 October 1989 (aged 34)	Gold	Left-handed	Right-arm medium-fast	2024	Captain
All-rounders
18	**Shoaib Malik**	Pakistan	1 February 1982 (aged 42)	Gold	Right-handed	Right-arm off break	2023	
21	**Mohammad Nawaz**	Pakistan	21 March 1994 (aged 29)	Platinum	Left-handed	Left-arm orthodox	2024	
23	**Arafat Minhas**	Pakistan	2 January 2005 (aged 19)	Silver	Left-handed	Left-arm orthodox	2024	
48	**Anwar Ali**	Pakistan	25 November 1987 (aged 36)	Silver	Right-handed	Right-arm medium-fast	2024	
55	**Kieron Pollard**	West Indies	15 May 1987 (aged 36)	Platinum	Right-handed	Right-arm medium	2024	
88	**Jamie Overton**	England	10 April 1994 (aged 29)	Supplementary	Right-handed	Right-arm fast-medium	2024	
95	**Daniel Sams**	Australia	27 October 1992 (aged 31)	Platinum	Right-handed	Left-arm fast-medium	2024	
Wicket-keepers
24	Saad Baig	Pakistan	1 November 2006 (aged 17)	Supplementary	Left-handed	—N/a	2024	
43	**Tim Seifert**	New Zealand	14 December 1994 (aged 29)	Diamond	Right-handed	—N/a	2024	
50	Muhammad Akhlaq	Pakistan	12 November 1992 (aged 31)	Silver	Right-handed	Right-arm medium-fast	2023	
Bowlers
9	Mohammad Amir Khan	Pakistan	9 September 2001 (aged 22)	Silver	Right-handed	Right-arm medium fast	2024	
26	**Tabraiz Shamsi**	South Africa	18 February 1990 (aged 33)	Gold	Left-handed	Left-arm unorthodox	2023	
32	**Hasan Ali**	Pakistan	2 July 1994 (aged 29)	Diamond	Right-handed	Right-arm medium fast	2024	
38	Sirajuddin	Pakistan	2 January 2002 (aged 22)	Emerging	Right-handed	Right-arm medium-fast	2024	
40	**Blessing Muzarabani**	Zimbabwe	2 October 1996 (aged 27)	—N/a	Right-handed	Right-arm fast-medium	2024	Full replacement for Jamie Overton
56	Muhammad Rohid	United Arab Emirates	29 September 2002 (aged 21)	Supplementary	Left-handed	Left-arm fast-medium	2024	
85	**Zahid Mahmood**	Pakistan	20 March 1988 (aged 35)	—N/a	Right-handed	Right-arm leg break	2024	Partial replacement for Kieron Pollard; Full replacement for Saad Baig
92	**Mir Hamza**	Pakistan	10 September 1992 (aged 31)	Silver	Left-handed	Left-arm fast-medium	2022	
99	**Imran Tahir**	South Africa	27 March 1979 (aged 44)	—N/a	Right-handed	Right-arm leg break	2023	Full replacement for Tabraiz Shamsi
	Fawad Ali	Oman	30 April 1993 (aged 30)	—N/a	Left-handed	Left-arm fast-medium	2024	Partial replacement for Tim Seifert

- Source: ESPNcricinfo

== Management and coaching staff ==
Position	Name
Owner	Salman Iqbal
President	Wasim Akram
CEO	Tariq Wasi
Director	Haider Azhar
Head coach	Phil Simmons
Assistant coach	Muhammad Masroor
Batting coach	Ravi Bopara
Fast bowling coach	Steven Kirby
Fielding coach	Mohammad Mansoor
Physio	Imtiaz Khan
Trainer	Ibrahim Qureshi
Performance analyst	Mohsin Sheikh
Masseur	Muhammad Irfan
Head of marketing	Shehzad Hassan Khan
Media manager	Rai Azlan

- Source: Official website

== Kit manufacturers and sponsors ==
Shirt sponsor (chest)	Shirt sponsor (back)	Chest branding	Sleeve branding
ARY Laguna	Imtiaz Super Market	VGO Tel	Mughal Steel, Eazicolor, Dawlance

Playing kit

== Season standings ==
=== Points table ===
Pos	Team	Pld	W	L	NR	Pts	NRR
1	Multan Sultans (R)	10	7	3	0	14	1.150
2	Peshawar Zalmi (3rd)	10	6	3	1	13	0.147
3	Islamabad United (C)	10	5	4	1	11	0.224
4	Quetta Gladiators (4th)	10	5	4	1	11	−0.921
5	Karachi Kings	10	4	6	0	8	−0.192
6	Lahore Qalandars	10	1	8	1	3	−0.554

Source: ESPNcricinfo

The four top-ranked teams qualified for the Playoffs.
Advanced to Qualifier
Advanced to Eliminator 1

Notes

- C = Champions;
- R = Runner-up;
- (x) = Position at the end of the tournament;

== Group fixtures ==
Match 3
18 February 2024
19:00 (D/N)
Scorecard

(H) Multan Sultans; 185/2 (20 overs)	v	Karachi Kings; 130/8 (20 overs)
Reeza Hendricks 79* (54); Mir Hamza 1/30 (4 overs)		Shoaib Malik 53 (35); Mohammad Ali 3/23 (4 overs)

Multan Sultans won by 55 runs
Multan Cricket Stadium, Multan
Umpires: Chris Gaffaney (NZ) and Rashid Riaz (Pak)
Player of the match: Reeza Hendricks (Multan Sultans)

- Karachi Kings won the toss and elected to field.
- Saad Baig (Karachi Kings) made his T20 debut.

Match 6
21 February 2024
14:00
Scorecard

Peshawar Zalmi; 154 (19.5 overs)	v	Karachi Kings; 157/3 (16.5 overs)
Babar Azam 72 (51); Mir Hamza 3/28 (4 overs)		Kieron Pollard 49* (21); Luke Wood 2/20 (3.5 overs)

Karachi Kings won by 7 wickets
Gaddafi Stadium, Lahore
Umpires: Michael Gough (Eng) and Ahsan Raza (Pak)
Player of the match: Mir Hamza (Karachi Kings)

- Karachi Kings won the toss and elected to field.

Match 10
24 February 2024
19:00 (D/N)
Scorecard

(H) Lahore Qalandars; 175/6 (20 overs)	v	Karachi Kings; 176/8 (20 overs)
Sahibzada Farhan 72* (45); Hasan Ali 2/29 (4 overs)		Kieron Pollard 58 (33); Ahsan Hafeez 2/19 (2 overs)

Karachi Kings won by 2 wickets
Gaddafi Stadium, Lahore
Umpires: Richard Illingworth (Eng) and Ahsan Raza (Pak)
Player of the match: Kieron Pollard (Karachi Kings)

- Karachi Kings won the toss and elected to field.

Match 15
28 February 2024
19:00 (D/N)
Scorecard

(H) Karachi Kings; 165/5 (20 overs)	v	Islamabad United; 169/3 (18.3 overs)
Kieron Pollard 48* (28); Salman Ali Agha 1/17 (2 overs)		Colin Munro 82 (47); Mohammad Nawaz 1/23 (4 overs)

Islamabad United won by 7 wickets
National Stadium, Karachi
Umpires: Chris Gaffaney (NZ) and Rashid Riaz (Pak)
Player of the match: Colin Munro (Islamabad United)

- Islamabad United won the toss and elected to field.

Match 16
29 February 2024
19:00 (D/N)
Scorecard

(H) Karachi Kings; 165/8 (20 overs)	v	Quetta Gladiators; 169/5 (20 overs)
James Vince 37 (25); Abrar Ahmed 3/31 (4 overs)		Sherfane Rutherford 58* (31); Zahid Mahmood 2/17 (4 overs)

Quetta Gladiators won by 5 wickets
National Stadium, Karachi
Umpires: Chris Gaffaney (NZ) and Abdul Muqeet (Pak)
Player of the match: Sherfane Rutherford (Quetta Gladiators)

- Quetta Gladiators won the toss and elected to field.

Match 19
3 March 2024
19:00 (D/N)
Scorecard

Multan Sultans; 189/3 (20 overs)	v	(H) Karachi Kings; 169/7 (20 overs)
Usman Khan 106* (59); Blessing Muzarabani 2/32 (4 overs)		Shoaib Malik 38 (28); Usama Mir 2/29 (4 overs)

Multan Sultans won by 20 runs
National Stadium, Karachi
Umpires: Faisal Afridi (Pak) and Chris Gaffaney (NZ)
Player of the match: Usman Khan (Multan Sultans)

- Multan Sultans won the toss and elected to bat.
- As a result of this match, Multan Sultans qualified for the playoffs.

Match 22
6 March 2024
14:00
Scorecard

Quetta Gladiators; 118 (19.1 overs)	v	Karachi Kings; 121/3 (15.3 overs)
Saud Shakeel 33 (28); Hasan Ali 4/15 (4 overs)		Tim Seifert 49 (31); Mohammad Amir 1/23 (2 overs)

Karachi Kings won by 7 wickets
Rawalpindi Cricket Stadium, Rawalpindi
Umpires: Richard Illingworth (Eng) and Asif Yaqoob (Pak)
Player of the match: Hasan Ali (Karachi Kings)

- Karachi Kings won the toss and elected to field.
- As a result of this match, Lahore Qalandars were eliminated from the tournament.

Match 24
7 March 2024
19:00 (D/N)
Scorecard

Karachi Kings; 150/7 (20 overs)	v	(H) Islamabad United; 151/5 (18.4 overs)
Kieron Pollard 39 (28); Tymal Mills 3/34 (4 overs)		Shadab Khan 34 (26); Mir Hamza 3/41 (4 overs)

Islamabad United won by 5 wickets
Rawalpindi Cricket Stadium, Rawalpindi
Umpires: Ruchira Palliyaguruge (SL) and Alex Wharf (Eng)
Player of the match: Faheem Ashraf (Islamabad United)

- Islamabad United won the toss and elected to field.

Match 26
9 March 2024
19:00 (D/N)
Scorecard

Lahore Qalandars; 177/5 (20 overs)	v	(H) Karachi Kings; 179/7 (20 overs)
Abdullah Shafique 55 (39); Zahid Mahmood 2/27 (4 overs)		James Vince 42 (27); Tayyab Abbas 2/23 (3 overs)

Karachi Kings won by 3 wickets
National Stadium, Karachi
Umpires: Richard Illingworth (Eng) and Rashid Riaz (Pak)
Player of the match: Irfan Khan (Karachi Kings)

- Karachi Kings won the toss and elected to field.

Match 29
11 March 2024
21:00 (D/N)
Scorecard

Peshawar Zalmi; 147/6 (20 overs)	v	(H) Karachi Kings; 145/5 (20 overs)
Babar Azam 51 (46); Arafat Minhas 1/11 (4 overs)		Tim Seifert 41 (30); Naveen-ul-Haq 2/22 (4 overs)

Peshawar Zalmi won by 2 runs
National Stadium, Karachi
Umpires: Faisal Afridi (Pak) and Alex Wharf (Eng)
Player of the match: Babar Azam (Peshawar Zalmi)

- Peshawar Zalmi won the toss and elected to bat.

== Statistics ==
=== Most runs ===
Player	Inns	Runs	Ave	HS	50s	100s
Shoaib Malik	10	254	31.75	53	1	0
Kieron Pollard	8	239	47.80	58	1	0
James Vince	9	214	26.75	42	0	0
Tim Seifert	7	182	26.00	49	0	0
Irfan Khan	8	171	42.75	39*	0	0

- Source: ESPNcricinfo

=== Most wickets ===
Player	Inns	Wkts	Ave	BBI
Hasan Ali	10	14	22.42	4/15
Mir Hamza	7	10	22.30	3/28
Zahid Mahmood	6	8	20.87	2/17
Blessing Muzarabani	5	6	25.50	2/27
Daniel Sams	4	4	38.50	2/28

- Source: ESPNcricinfo
