= 2020 Quetta Gladiators season =

Overview of Quetta Gladiators in 2020

Quetta Gladiators
2020 season
- Coach: Moin Khan
- Captain: Sarfraz Ahmed
- PSL 2020: 5th (eliminated)
- Most runs: Shane Watson (247)
- Most wickets: Mohammad Hasnain (15)

The Quetta Gladiators is a franchise cricket team that represents Quetta in Pakistan Super League. It was one of the six teams that competed in the 2020 season. Quetta Gladiators have previously lifted the PSL title for the first time in 2019, which makes them defending champion in 2020.

The team was captained by Sarfraz Ahmed, coached by Moin Khan and mentored by Viv Richards. Shane Watson was the team leading run-scorer while Mohammad Hasnain was leading wicket-taker.

The team won four of its ten fixtures and were eliminated for the first time in group stage.

== Squad ==
- Players with international caps are listed in **bold**.
- Ages are given as of the first match of the season, 20 February 2020

No.	Name	Nationality	Birth date	Batting style	Bowling style	Year signed	Notes
Batsmen
19	**Ahmed Shehzad**	Pakistan	23 November 1991 (aged 28)	Right-handed	Right-arm leg break	2019	
20	**Jason Roy**	England	21 July 1990 (aged 29)	Right-handed	Right-arm medium	2020	Overseas
42	**Khurram Manzoor**	Pakistan	10 June 1986 (aged 33)	Right-handed	Right-arm off break	2020	
93	**Ahsan Ali**	Pakistan	10 December 1993 (aged 26)	Right-handed	Right-arm leg break	2019	
96	**Umar Akmal**	Pakistan	26 May 1990 (aged 29)	Right-handed	Right-arm off spin	2019	
	Omair Yousuf	Pakistan	27 December 1998 (aged 21)	Right-handed	–	2020	
All-rounders
02	Aarish Ali Khan	Pakistan	20 December 2000 (aged 19)	Right-handed	Left-arm orthodox	2020	
21	**Mohammad Nawaz**	Pakistan	21 March 1994 (aged 25)	Left-handed	Slow left-arm orthodox	2016	
31	**Ben Cutting**	Australia	30 January 1987 (aged 33)	Right-handed	Right-arm fast-medium	2020	Overseas
33	**Shane Watson**	Australia	17 June 1981 (aged 38)	Right-handed	Right-arm fast-medium	2018	Overseas
48	**Anwar Ali**	Pakistan	25 November 1987 (aged 32)	Right-handed	Right-arm fast-medium	2018	Replacement for Umar Akmal
84	**Keemo Paul**	West Indies	21 February 1998 (aged 21)	Right-handed	Right-arm fast-medium	2020	Overseas
Wicket-keepers
45	Azam Khan	Pakistan	22 May 1987 (aged 32)	Left-handed	—	2019	
54	**Sarfaraz Ahmed**	Pakistan	22 May 1987 (aged 32)	Right-handed	—	2016	Captain
Bowlers
16	**Naseem Shah**	Pakistan	15 February 2003 (aged 17)	Right-handed	Right-arm fast	2019	
23	Abdul Nasir	Pakistan	25 December 1998 (aged 21)	Right-handed	Right-arm off break	2020	
44	Zahid Mehmood	Pakistan	20 March 1988 (aged 31)	Right-handed	Right-arm leg break	2020	Replacement for Naseem Shah
52	**Fawad Ahmed**	Australia	5 February 1982 (aged 38)	Right-handed	Right-arm leg break	2019	Overseas
56	**Tymal Mills**	England	12 August 1992 (aged 27)	Right-handed	Left-arm fast	2020	Overseas
87	**Mohammad Hasnain**	Pakistan	5 April 2000 (aged 19)	Right-handed	Right-arm fast	2019	
99	**Sohail Khan**	Pakistan	6 March 1984 (aged 35)	Right-handed	Right-arm fast	2020	

== Kit manufacturers and sponsors ==
Shirt sponsor (chest)	Shirt sponsor (back)	Chest branding	Sleeve branding
Engro	Engro	Master Oil	KFC, Ignite, ﺟﻨﮓ

Playing kit

== Season standings ==
Pos	Team	Pld	W	L	NR	Pts	NRR
1	Multan Sultans (3rd)	10	6	2	2	14	1.031
2	Karachi Kings (C)	10	5	4	1	11	−0.190
3	Lahore Qalandars (R)	10	5	5	0	10	−0.072
4	Peshawar Zalmi (4th)	10	4	5	1	9	−0.055
5	Quetta Gladiators	10	4	5	1	9	−0.722
6	Islamabad United	10	3	6	1	7	0.185

Source: ESPNcricinfo
- The top four teams qualified for the playoffs
- Advanced to Qualifier
- Advanced to Eliminator 1

== Season summary ==
Quetta Gladiators started their campaign by defeating Islamabad United by 3 wickets in the opening game of the tournament. In their second match, Quetta lost to Peshawar Zalmi by six wickets. The team won their next two matches against Karachi Kings and Islamabad United respectively, both by five wickets. Quetta then went on a losing streak, facing defeat in their next four matches. Their ninth match was abandoned due to rain. In their last match of the group stage, Quetta defeated Karachi Kings by 5 wickets equaling points with Peshawar Zalmi but failed to qualify for knockouts due to low run-rate. They finished on fifth and were eliminated from the tournament.

== See also ==
- Islamabad United in 2020
- Karachi Kings in 2020
- Lahore Qalandars in 2020
