= List of radio channels in Pakistan =

This is a list of radio stations in Pakistan.

== Azad Jammu & Kashmir ==
| Name | Website | |
|---|---|---|
| Suno FM 89.4 | | |
| FM 90 Mirpur | | |
| FM105 Voice of Kashmir | | |
| FM101 Mirpur | | |
| Spice FM 107 Mirpur | | The best coverage area of any Mirpur-based radio station. |

== Balochistan ==
| Name | Broadcast region | Frequency | Language(s) | Website |
|---|---|---|---|---|
| Radio Pakistan | Quetta | AM 750 | Urdu, Balochi, Brahui, Pashto, Punjabi, Hazaragi | |
| Radio Pakistan | Khuzdar | AM 560 | Urdu, Balochi, Brahui, Punjabi | |
| Radio Pakistan | Turbat | AM 1580 | Urdu, Balochi, Punjabi | |
| Radio Pakistan | Sibi | AM 1580 | Urdu, Balochi, Pashto, Punjabi | |
| Radio Chiltan | Quetta | FM 88.0 | Urdu, Balochi, Brahui, Pashto, Punjabi | |
| Radio Jhalawan | Khuzdar | FM 88.0 | Urdu, Balochi, Brahui, Punjabi | |
| Suno Pakistan | Gwadar | FM 89.4 & 96.0 | Urdu, English, Punjabi | |
| Suno Pakistan | Khuzdar | FM 89.4 & 96.0 | Urdu, English, Punjabi | |
| Suno Pakistan | Turbat | FM 89.4 & 96.0 | Urdu, English, Punjabi | |
| Suno Pakistan | Panjgur | FM 89.4 & 96.0 | Urdu, English, Punjabi | |
| Suno Pakistan | Sibi | FM 89.4 & 96.0 | Urdu, English, Punjabi | |
| Radio ONE | Gwadar | FM 91.0 | Urdu, English, Punjabi | |
| Radio Pakistan | Gwadar | FM 101.0 | Urdu, Balochi, English, Punjabi | |
| Radio Pakistan | Quetta | FM 101.0 | Urdu, Balochi, Pashto, English, Punjabi | |
| HOT FM | Quetta | FM 105.0 | Urdu, Balochi, Pashto, English, Punjabi | |

== Federally Administered Tribal Areas ==
| Name | Broadcast region | Frequency | Language(s) | Website |
|---|---|---|---|---|
| Radio Khyber | Jamrud | FM 91.0 | Pashto, Urdu, Punjabi | |
| Radio Waziristan | North Waziristan | SUNO FM 96.0 | Pashto, Waziri Urdu | |
| Shamal Radio | Bajaur | FM 98.6 | Pashto, Urdu, Punjabi | |

== Gilgit Baltistan ==
| Name | Broadcast region | Frequency | Language(s) |
|---|---|---|---|
| Radio Pakistan | Gilgit | AM 1510 | Urdu, Shina, Wakhi, Burushaski, Khowar, Punjabi |
| Radio Pakistan | Skardu | AM 1560 | Urdu, Balti, Punjabi |
| SunoFm | Gilgit, Skardu, Hunza, Chilas | FM 89.4 | Urdu, Balti, Shina, Brushuski |
| GB93 | Skardu | FM 93.0 | Urdu, Balti, Punjabi |
| GB99 | Gilgit | FM 99.0 | Urdu, Shina, Wakhi, Burushaski, Khowar, Punjabi |

== Islamabad Capital Territory ==
=== AM ===
| Name | Frequency | Website |
|---|---|---|
| News and Current Affair (Radio Pakistan) | AM 552 KHZ | |
| Radio Pakistan (Broadcast) | AM 585 KHZ | |

=== FM ===
| Name | Website |
|---|---|
| Sindh Police FM 88.6 | |
| City FM 89.0 | |
| Radio FM World Pakistan | |
| SunoFM 89.4 | |
| Hum Awaz 90.0 | |
| FM 90.6 (Islamic International University Campus Radio) | |
| FM 91.6 (Allama Iqbal Open University Campus Radio) | |
| ITP FM 92.4 | |
| FM 93 (Radio Pakistan) | |
| FM 94 (Fatima Jinnah Women University Campus Radio) | |
| Virsa FM 94.5 (Urdu & traditional languages station) | |
| Tehlka FM 94.6 (Urdu & Punjabi language station) | |
| Punjab Rung 95.0 (Punjabi language station) | |
| FM 96.6 (Sindh Madressat ul Islam University Campus Radio) | |
| Dosti FM 98.0 (Urdu, English and Chinese language radio station) | |
| FM 98.6 (Margalla Girls College Campus Radio) | |
| NUST FM 101.4 (National University of Science & Technology Islamabad Campus Radio) | |
| RIU FM 102.2 | |
| NUMAL FM 104.6 | |
| HUM FM 106.2 | |
| ZAB FM 106.6 (SZABIST Islamabad Campus Radio) | |
| RadioOne 91.0 | |
| Power Radio FM 99 Islamabad | |
| MERA FM 107.4 | |
| FM100 Islamabad | |
| FM 101 Islamabad | |
| Sunrise Pakistan FM 97 | |

=== Internet ===
| Name | Website |
|---|---|
| Radio FM World Pakistan | |

== Khyber Pakhtunkhwa ==
=== AM ===
| Name | Broadcast region | Frequency | Website |
|---|---|---|---|
| Radio Pakistan | Peshawar | AM540 | |
| Radio Pakistan | Dera Ismail Khan | AM711 | |
| Radio Pakistan | Abbottabad | AM1600 | |
| Radio Pakistan | Chitral | AM1580 | |

=== FM ===
| Name | Broadcast region | Website |
|---|---|---|
| Smile FM 88.6 | Haripur | |
| Smile FM 88.6 | Abbottabad | |
| Smile FM 88.6 | Mansehra | |
| Smile FM 88.6 | Swabi | |
| Sunofm FM96 | – | |
| Power Radio FM99 | Abbottabad | |
| Global FM 91 | Dera Ismail Khan | |
| FM 92.2 Pukhtunkhwa Radio | Peshawar | |
| FM 92.6 Pukhtunkhwa Radio | Mardan | |
| Radio Dilber FM 93 | Charsadda | |
| Radio Dilber FM 94 | Swabi | |
| Radio HUM Awaz FM94 | Peshawar | |
| Radio HUM Awaz FM99 | Thal & Hangu | |
| Radio HUM Awaz FM100.0 | Dir | |
| FM96 | Haripur | |
| FM 99.0 | Dera Ismail Khan | |
| FM100.6 | Abbottabad | |
| FM101.0 | Peshawar | |
| FM101.0 | Bannu | |
| FM101.0 | Kohat | |
| Radio Buraq 104.0 | Peshawar | |
| Radio Buraq 104.0 | Mansehra | |
| Radio Buraq 105.0 | Mardan | |
| UPESH FM 107.0 (University of Peshawar Campus Radio) | – | |
| KUST-FM 98.2 (Kohat University of Science & Technology Campus Radio) | – | |

Radio Tehzeeb FM91.6 (www.radiotehzeeb.com)

== Punjab ==
=== AM ===
| Name | Broadcast region | Frequency | Website |
|---|---|---|---|
| News and Current Affair (Radio Pakistan) | Lahore | AM 1332 KHZ | |
| Radio Pakistan (Broadcast) | Lahore | AM 630 KHZ | |
| Radio Pakistan (Broadcast) | Rawalpindi | AM 1152 KHZ | |
| Radio Pakistan (Broadcast) | Multan | AM 1035 KHZ | |
| Radio Pakistan (Broadcast) | Bahawalpur | AM 1341 KHZ | |
| Radio Pakistan (Broadcast) | Faisalabad | AM 1430 KHZ | |

=== FM ===
| Name | Frequency | Broadcast region | Website |
|---|---|---|---|
| Smile FM | FM 88.6 | Attock, Hassanabdal, Wah Cantt, Taxila | |
| AWAZ Radio | FM 99.4 | Lahore | |
| AWAZ Radio | FM 107 | Sheikhpura | |
| AWAZ Radio | FM 107 | Pakpattan | |
| AWAZ Radio | FM 104 | Bhalwal - Sargodha | |
| AWAZ Radio | FM 104 | Rajanpur | |
| AWAZ Radio | FM 105 | Bahawalpur | |
| AWAZ Radio | FM 105 | Gujrat | |
| AWAZ Radio | FM 105 | Sadiqabad | |
| AWAZ Radio | FM 105 | Jhang | |
| AWAZ Radio | FM 105 | Attock | |
| AWAZ Radio | FM 105 | Sahiwal | |
| AWAZ Radio | FM 105 | Mandi Bahauddin | |
| AWAZ Radio | FM 106 | Gujranwala | |
| AWAZ Radio | FM 106 | Khanpur | |
| AWAZ Radio | FM 106 | Okara | |
| FM 93.5 | | Rawalpindi | |
| HUM FM | FM 106.2 | Lahore | |
| FM 96 Sargodha Pakistan | FM 96 | Sargodha | |
| HamaraFM | FM 98 | Mandi Bahauddin | |
| HamaraFM | FM 98 | Pind Daddan Khan | |
| Radio Buraq | FM 104-105 | – | |
| FM 104, Punjab University | FM 104 | – | |
| Radioactive FM 96 | FM 96 | – | |
| Mast FM | FM 103 | – | |
| FM95 Pakistan, Punjab Rung | FM 95 | Lahore | |
| Super FM 90 | FM 90 | Bahawalnagar | |
| Hamara FM 97.0 Kharian | FM 97 | Kharian, Sri alamgir, Jehlum, Lalamusa, Dinga, Guliana, Golra Hashim, Bhagwal, Kotla Haji Shah, Kotla Arab Ali Khan, Jalapur Jattan, Thutha Rai Bahadar, Gujrat, Kunjah | |
| FM 98.6 Radio Station (Lahore Chamber of Commerce) | FM 98.6 | Lahore | |
| APNA LAHORE FM 107.4 | FM 107.4 | Lahore | |
| Campus Radio VOV (Voice of Varsity) FM 98.2 (University of Sargodha) | FM 98.2 | Sargodha | |
| DIL FM NETWORK | – | – | |
| Radio Kinnaird 97.6 FM (Kinnaird College for Women Lahore) | FM 97.6 | Lahore | |
| FJWU Radio VOW (Voice of Women) FM 96.6 | FM 96.6 | – | |
| Sunrise FM 96 Sargodha | FM 96 | Sargodha | |
| Solo Radio FM 88 Multan | FM 88 | Multan | |
| Voice of Heart FM | – | – | |
| FM 88 Chakwal | FM 88 | Chakwal | |
| CityFM89 | FM 89 | Lahore | |
| CityFM89 | FM 89 | Faisalabad | |
| Radio1 FM91 | FM 91 | Lahore | |
| Radio1 FM91 | FM 91 | Rawalpindi | |
| Radio City FM92 Kasur | FM 92 | Kasur | |
| Powe Radio FM99 | FM 99 | Vehari | |
| FM 100 | FM 100 | Lahore | |
| FM 100 | FM 100 | Rawalpindi | |
| FM 100 | FM 100 | Rahim Yar Khan | |
| FM 100 | FM 100 | Multan | |
| FM 101 | FM 101 | Lahore | |
| FM 101 | FM 101 | Rawalpindi | |
| FM 101 | FM 101 | Faisalabad | |
| Mast FM103 | FM 103 | Lahore | |
| Mast FM103 | FM 103 | Faisalabad | |
| Mast FM103 | FM 103 | Multan | |
| Radio Buraq FM104 Sialkot | FM 104 | Sialkot | |
| Punjab University Radio FM 104.6 Lahore | FM 104.6 | Lahore | |
| Star FM102 Gujar Khan | FM 102 | Gujar Khan | |
| Hamara FM 94.6 Multan | FM 94.6 | Multan | |
| Sunrise Pakistan FM95 Jhelum | FM 95 | Jhelum | |
| Apki Awaz FM95 Toba Tek Singh | FM 95 | Toba Tek Singh | |
| LCWU FM 96.6 | FM 96.6 | – | |
| Josh FM 99 | – | – | |
| Ewaz FM | – | – | |
| Radio Jeevay Pakistan FM98 | FM 98 | – | |
| LUMS Radio | – | – | |
| Rasta FM 88.8 | FM 88.8 | – | |
| FM95 Punjab Rung | FM 95 | – | |
| Suno Pakistan FM 89.4 | FM 89.4 | Faisalabad | |
| Suno Pakistan FM 89.4 | FM 89.4 | Lahore | |
| Suno Pakistan FM 89.4 | FM 89.4 | Murree | |
| Suno Pakistan FM 89.4 | FM 89.4 | Multan | |
| Suno Pakistan FM 89.4 | FM 89.4 | Rahim Yar Khan | |
| Suno Pakistan FM 89.4 | FM 89.4 | Bahawalpur | |
| Suno Pakistan FM 89.4 | FM 89.4 | Chak Jhumra | |
| Suno Pakistan FM 89.4 | FM 89.4 | Kallar Kahar | |
| Suno Pakistan FM 89.4 | FM 89.4 | Sargodha | |
| Humara FM 90 Faisalabad | FM 90 | Faisalabad | |
| PBC FM 93 (Radio Pakistan) | FM 93 | Faisalabad | |
| Dhamal FM 94 Faisalabad | FM 94 | Faisalabad | |
| Shalimar FM 94.6 Faisalabad | FM 94.6 | Faisalabad | |
| Radio Tufians FM 96.6 Faisalabad | FM 96.6 | Faisalabad | |
| FM 100.4 UAF Campus Radio | FM 100.4 | Faisalabad | |
| HumAwaz FM | – | – | |
| Dabang FM 90.4 Attock | FM 90.4 | Attock | |

== Internet ==
| Name | Broadcast region | Website |
|---|---|---|
| Liberty Beats Radio | Lahore | |
| Shopen Anime Radio | Lahore | |

== Sindh ==
=== AM ===
| Name | Broadcast region | Frequency | Website |
|---|---|---|---|
| Radio Pakistan | Karachi | AM820 | |
| Radio Pakistan | Hyderabad | AM1008 | |
| Radio Pakistan | Larkana | AM1000 | |
| Radio Pakistan | Khairpur | AM920 | |

=== FM ===
| Name | Frequency | Broadcast Region | Website |
|---|---|---|---|
| Sindh Police FM 88.6 | FM 88.6 | Karachi | |
| CityFM89 | FM 89 | Karachi | |
| Suno Pakistan FM 89.4 | FM 89.4 | Karachi | |
| Suno Pakistan FM 89.4 | FM 89.4 | Hyderabad | |
| FM 90.6 Campus Radio (University of Karachi) | FM 90.6 | Karachi | |
| Radio1 FM91 | FM 91 | Karachi | |
| Music Highway FM | FM 91 | Tando Adam | |
| Music Highway FM | FM 92 | Nooriabad | |
| Music Highway FM | FM 92 | Khairpur | |
| Radio FM 93 (Radio Pakistan) | FM 93 | – | |
| Planet FM 94 (Radio Pakistan) | FM 94 | – | |
| Saut ul Quran (Radio Pakistan) | FM 93.4 | – | |
| Hamara FM 94.6 | FM 94.6 | Karachi | |
| Karachi FM | FM 96 | Karachi | |
| FM 98.2 Campus Radio (Ziauddin University) | FM 98.2 | Karachi | |
| Awaz FM 99 | FM 99 | Karachi/Hyderabad/Jamshoro | |
| FM 100 | FM 100 | Karachi | |
| FM 100 | FM 100 | Hyderabad | |
| FM 101 | FM 101 | Karachi | |
| FM 101 | FM 101 | Hyderabad | |
| Mast FM 103 | FM 103 | Karachi | |
| HOT FM | FM 105 | Karachi | |
| HOT FM | FM 105.4 | Nawabshah | |
| HOT FM | FM 105 | Hyderabad | |
| HUM FM 106.2 | FM 106.2 | Karachi | |
| HUM FM 106.2 | FM 106.2 | Sukkur | |
| Zab FM 106.6 (SZABIST) | FM 106.6 | Karachi | |
| Apna Karachi FM 107 | FM 107 | Karachi | |
| MERA FM 107.4 | FM 107.4 | Karachi | |

== Internet ==
| Name | Website |
|---|---|
| Radio FM World Pakistan | |
| Aladin Radio | |

== See also ==
- Mass media in Pakistan
- Pakistan Broadcasting Corporation (PBC)
- Pakistan Electronic Media Regulatory Authority
- List of Pakistani television channels
