= Radioactive (disambiguation) =

Radioactive describes something undergoing radioactive decay, the process by which an unstable atomic nucleus emits radiation.

Radioactive may also refer to:

== Materials ==
- Naturally occurring radioactive material
- Nuclear pharmacy, the preparation of radioactive materials for nuclear medicine
- Radioactive contamination
- Radioactive waste

== Entertainment ==
- Radioactive, a graphic novel by Lauren Redniss
- Radioactive (film), a biographical film about Marie Curie

=== Music ===
- Radio:Active the fourth album from British pop rock group McFly
- Radioactive (Yelawolf album), a 2011 album by rapper Yelawolf
- Radioactive, a Swedish rock project formed by Tommy Denander in 2001
- Radioactive Records, a record label
- Radioactive FM 96, a radio station, which broadcasts from Karachi, Pakistan

==== Songs ====
- "Radioactive" (The Firm song), a song from the 1985 album The Firm by the English supergroup The Firm
- "Radioactive" (Imagine Dragons song), a 2012 song by Imagine Dragons
- "Radioactive" (Kings of Leon song), a 2010 song by Kings of Leon
- "Radioactive" (Marina and the Diamonds song), a 2011 song by Marina and the Diamonds
- "Radioactive" (Rita Ora song), a 2013 song by Rita Ora
- "Radioactive" (Gene Simmons song), a song from the 1978 album Gene Simmons by Gene Simmons

== See also ==
- Radioactive Man (disambiguation)
- Radio Active (disambiguation)
- Radioactivity (disambiguation)
