= Radio Active =

Radio Active may refer to:

- Radio Active (radio series), a radio comedy programme broadcast on BBC Radio 4 during the 1980s
- Radio Active (TV series), a television show on YTV in Canada
- Radio Active (New Zealand), a radio station based in Wellington, New Zealand
- Radio Active (Sweden), a radio station based in Ystad, Sweden
- Radio Active (Fuzzy Haskins album), 1978
- Radio Active (Pat Travers album)
- Radio:Active, a 2008 album by British pop punk band McFly

== See also ==
- Radioactive (disambiguation)
- Radioactive decay
- Radioactive Man (disambiguation)
