= 2020 Karachi Kings season =

Overview of Karachi Kings in 2020

Karachi Kings
2020 season
- Coach: Dean Jones
- Captain: Imad Wasim (9 matches); Babar Azam (1 match)
- PSL 2020: 1st (winners)
- Most runs: Babar Azam (473)
- Most wickets: Mohammad Amir (10)

The Karachi Kings is a franchise cricket team that represents Karachi in the Pakistan Super League since 2016 and is one of the expensive teams in League's history. They were one of the six teams that competed in the 2020 season. In the final, they beat Lahore Qalandars by 5 wickets, to win their maiden PSL title.

The team was captained by Imad Wasim, coached by Dean Jones, until his sudden death in September 2020. Babar Azam was the team's leading run-scorer while, Mohammad Amir was leading wicket-taker.

The team won five of its ten fixtures with one being washed out, therefore, qualified for the play-offs.

== Impact of COVID-19 ==
The playoff stage of the tournament was postponed due to the COVID-19 pandemic. On 2 July 2020, PCB announced that they are looking forward to completing the season in November 2020. On 2 September 2020, the PCB confirmed the fixtures for the remaining matches. The matches are scheduled to be held at Gaddafi Stadium in Lahore, in the month of November on 14 and 15, with the final scheduled to be played on 17.

== Squad ==
- Players with international caps are listed in **bold**.
- Ages are given as of the first day of the season, 20 February 2020

No.	Name	Nationality	Birth date	Batting style	Bowling style	Signed year	Notes
Batsmen
10	**Alex Hales**	England	3 January 1989 (aged 31)	Right-handed	Right-arm medium	2020	Overseas
24	Cameron Delport	South Africa	12 May 1989 (aged 30)	Left-handed	Right-arm medium	2020	Overseas
56	**Babar Azam**	Pakistan	15 October 1994 (aged 25)	Right-handed	Right-arm off break	2017	Vice-captain
98	**Sharjeel Khan**	Pakistan	14 August 1989 (aged 30)	Left-handed	Right-arm leg break	2020	
	**Awais Zia**	Pakistan	1 September 1986 (aged 33)	Left-handed	Right-arm off break	2019	
All-rounders
9	**Imad Wasim**	Pakistan	18 December 1988 (aged 31)	Left-handed	Slow left-arm orthodox	2016	Captain
12	**Aamer Yamin**	Pakistan	26 June 1990 (aged 29)	Right-handed	Right-arm medium-fast	2019	Unavailable due to injury
96	**Iftikhar Ahmed**	Pakistan	3 September 1990 (aged 29)	Right-handed	Right-arm off break	2019	
	Dan Lawrence	England	12 July 1997 (aged 22)	Right-handed	Right-arm off break	2020	Overseas, unavailable
Wicket-keepers
16	**Mohammad Rizwan**	Pakistan	12 June 1992 (aged 27)	Right-handed	Right-arm medium	2018	
59	**Chadwick Walton**	West Indies	3 July 1985 (aged 34)	Right-handed	-	2020	Overseas. Replacement for Dan Lawrence
Bowlers
5	**Mohammad Amir**	Pakistan	13 April 1992 (aged 27)	Left-handed	Left-arm fast medium	2016	
13	Umaid Asif	Pakistan	30 April 1984 (aged 35)	Right-handed	Right-arm medium fast	2020	
15	Umer Khan	Pakistan	5 August 1999 (aged 20)	Left-handed	Slow left-arm orthodox	2019	
23	Usama Mir	Pakistan	23 December 1995 (aged 24)	Right-handed	Right-arm leg break	2016	
32	Arshad Iqbal	Pakistan	26 December 2000 (aged 19)	Right-handed	Right-arm medium fast	2020	
34	**Chris Jordan**	England	4 October 1988 (aged 31)	Right-handed	Right-arm fast medium	2020	Overseas
47	**Ali Khan**	United States	13 December 1990 (aged 29)	Right-handed	Right-arm fast medium	2020	Overseas
58	**Waqas Maqsood**	Pakistan	4 November 1987 (aged 32)	Right-handed	Left-arm medium fast	2020	Replacement for Aamer Yamin
81	**Mitchell McClenaghan**	New Zealand	11 June 1986 (aged 33)	Left-handed	Left-arm fast medium	2020	Overseas, Replacement for Liam Plunkett
	**Liam Plunkett**	England	6 April 1985 (aged 34)	Right-handed	Right-arm fast	2020	Overseas, unavailable

== Kit manufacturers and sponsors ==
Kit manufacturer	Shirt sponsor (chest)	Shirt sponsor (back)	Chest branding	Sleeve branding
AJ Sports	ARY Laguna	QMobile	Surf Excel	Imtiaz Super Market, Mughal Steel, ARY Laguna

Playing kit

== Season standings ==
Pos	Team	Pld	W	L	NR	Pts	NRR
1	Multan Sultans (3rd)	10	6	2	2	14	1.031
2	Karachi Kings (C)	10	5	4	1	11	−0.190
3	Lahore Qalandars (R)	10	5	5	0	10	−0.072
4	Peshawar Zalmi (4th)	10	4	5	1	9	−0.055
5	Quetta Gladiators	10	4	5	1	9	−0.722
6	Islamabad United	10	3	6	1	7	0.185

Source: ESPNcricinfo
- The top four teams qualified for the playoffs
- Advanced to Qualifier
- Advanced to Eliminator 1
