= 2020 Islamabad United season =

Overview of Islamabad United in 2020

Islamabad United
2020 season
- Coach: Misbah-ul-Haq
- Captain: Shadab Khan
- PSL 2020: 6th (eliminated)
- Most runs: Luke Ronchi (247)
- Most wickets: Shadab Khan (8)

Islamabad United is a franchise cricket team that represents Islamabad in the Pakistan Super League (PSL). They were one of the six teams that had competed in the 2020 PSL season.

The team was captained by Shadab Khan and coached by Misbah-ul-Haq. Luke Ronchi was the team leading run-scorer in the 2020 PSL, while Shadab Khan was the leading wicket-taker.

The team won three of its ten fixtures and were eliminated for the first time in group stage.

== Squad ==
- Players with international caps are listed in **bold**.
- Ages are given as of the date of the first match in the tournament, 20 February 2020.

No.	Name	Nationality	Birth date	Batting style	Bowling style	Year signed	Notes
Batsmen
6	Saif Badar	Pakistan	3 July 1998 (aged 21)	Right-handed	Right-arm leg break	2020	
22	Rizwan Hussain	Pakistan	26 April 1996 (aged 23)	Left-handed	–	2019	
29	**Dawid Malan**	England	3 September 1987 (aged 32)	Left-handed	Right-arm leg break	2020	Overseas, Replacement for Rassie Van Der Dussen
38	**Colin Ingram**	South Africa	3 July 1985 (aged 34)	Left-handed	Right-arm leg spin	2020	Overseas
45	**Asif Ali**	Pakistan	1 October 1991 (aged 28)	Right-handed	Right-arm off break	2016	
82	**Colin Munro**	New Zealand	11 March 1987 (aged 32)	Left-handed	Right-arm medium	2020	Overseas
	**Rassie van der Dussen**	South Africa	7 February 1989 (aged 31)	Right-handed	Right-arm leg break	2020	Overseas, Unavailable
All-rounders
7	**Shadab Khan**	Pakistan	4 October 1998 (aged 21)	Right-handed	Right-arm leg break	2017	Captain
9	Amad Butt	Pakistan	10 May 1995 (aged 24)	Right-handed	Right-arm fast	2016	
17	**Zafar Gohar**	Pakistan	1 February 1995 (aged 25)	Left-handed	Slow left-arm orthodox	2020	
18	**Hussain Talat**	Pakistan	12 February 1996 (aged 24)	Left-handed	Right-arm medium	2016	
41	**Faheem Ashraf**	Pakistan	16 January 1994 (aged 26)	Left-handed	Right-arm fast-medium	2018	
Wicket-keepers
28	Phil Salt	England	28 August 1996 (aged 23)	Right-handed	Right-arm medium	2020	Overseas
54	**Luke Ronchi**	New Zealand	23 April 1981 (aged 38)	Right-handed	—	2018	Overseas
Bowlers
3	Ahmed Safi Abdullah	Pakistan	1 March 1998 (aged 21)	Left-handed	Slow left-arm orthodox	2020	
8	**Dale Steyn**	South Africa	27 June 1983 (aged 36)	Right-handed	Right-arm fast	2020	Overseas
11	**Rumman Raees**	Pakistan	18 October 1991 (aged 28)	Right-handed	Left-arm medium-fast	2020	
14	**Musa Khan**	Pakistan	28 August 2000 (aged 19)	Right-handed	Right-arm fast	2018	
88	Akif Javed	Pakistan	10 October 2000 (aged 19)	Right-handed	Left-arm fast-medium	2020	

== Kit manufacturers and sponsors ==
Shirt sponsor (chest)	Shirt sponsor (back)	Chest branding	Sleeve branding
Dastak		Fast cables	Express News, FM 101

Home kit

Away kit

== Season summary ==
Islamabad United started their campaign with a defeat against the defending champions, Quetta Gladiators in the opening game of the tournament. They won their next two matches against Multan Sultans and Lahore Qalanders respectively. In their fourth match, Quetta Gladiators again defeated Islamabad. Their next match against Peshawar Zalmi was washed out due to rain. They lost their next match against Karachi Kings by 5 wickets. Islamabad defeated Lahore Qalanders convincingly in their next match by 71 runs which was the highest winning margin in PSL. It marked their last win in the tournament as they faced defeat in their remaining three matches.

The team finished last in the group and were knocked-out of the tournament.

Pos	Team	Pld	W	L	NR	Pts	NRR
1	Multan Sultans (3rd)	10	6	2	2	14	1.031
2	Karachi Kings (C)	10	5	4	1	11	−0.190
3	Lahore Qalandars (R)	10	5	5	0	10	−0.072
4	Peshawar Zalmi (4th)	10	4	5	1	9	−0.055
5	Quetta Gladiators	10	4	5	1	9	−0.722
6	Islamabad United	10	3	6	1	7	0.185

Source: ESPNcricinfo
- The top four teams qualified for the playoffs
- Advanced to Qualifier
- Advanced to Eliminator 1
