= 2020 Lahore Qalandars season =

Overview of Lahore Qalandars in 2020

Lahore Qalandars
2020 season
- Coach: Aaqib Javed
- Captain: Sohail Akhtar
- PSL 2020: Runners-up
- Most runs: Chris Lynn (284) (Note: Fakhar Zaman scored 45 runs against MCC, which is not counted as PSL runs)
- Most wickets: Shaheen Afridi (13)

The Lahore Qalandars cricket team is one of six teams that competed in the 2020 Pakistan Super League, representing Lahore.

Qalandars was captained by Sohail Akhtar throughout the season, the top scorer was Chris Lynn with 284 runs, but the batsman with highest average was Australian cricketer Ben Dunk, whereas the leading wicket-taker was Shaheen Afridi. For the first time in PSL history, Lahore Qalandars qualified for the play-offs after winning five of their ten group-stage matches, and finishing at third position on the points table.

== Impact of COVID-19 ==
The playoff stage of the tournament was postponed due to the COVID-19 pandemic. On 2 July 2020, PCB announced that they are looking forward to complete the season in November 2020. On 2 September 2020, the PCB confirmed the fixtures for the remaining matches. The matches were previously scheduled to be held at Gaddafi Stadium in Lahore, on 14 and 15 November, with the final scheduled to be played on 17 of November. On 24 October 2020, PCB announced that the playoffs and final of the season are relocated to National Stadium, Karachi due to poor air quality and heavy chances of smog in Lahore.

== Squad ==
- Players with international caps are shown in **bold**
- Ages are given as of the first match of the season, 20 February 2020

| No. | Name | Nationality | Birth date | Batting style | Bowling style | Year signed | Notes |
Batsmen
| 01 | **Salman Butt** | Pakistan | 7 October 1984 (aged 35) | Left-handed | Right-arm off spin | 2019 | |
| 39 | **Fakhar Zaman** | Pakistan | 10 April 1990 (aged 29) | Left-handed | Slow left-arm orthodox | 2017 | |
| 50 | **Chris Lynn** | Australia | 10 April 1990 (aged 29) | Right-handed | Slow left-arm orthodox | 2020 | Overseas |
| 54 | **Lendl Simmons** | West Indies | 25 January 1985 (aged 35) | Right-handed | Right-arm medium-fast | 2020 | Overseas. Unavailable for season. |
All-rounders
| 05 | Raja Farzan | Pakistan | 12 May 1995 (aged 24) | Left-handed | Right-arm leg break | 2020 | |
| 6 | Muhammad Faizan | Pakistan | 7 May 1997 (aged 22) | Right-handed | Right-arm medium | 2020 | |
| 8 | **Mohammad Hafeez** | Pakistan | 17 October 1980 (aged 39) | Right-handed | Right-arm off break | 2019 | |
| 11 | Sohail Akhtar | Pakistan | 2 March 1986 (aged 33) | Right-handed | Right-arm medium | 2020 | Captain |
| 29 | **Samit Patel** | England | 30 November 1984 (aged 35) | Right-handed | Slow left-arm orthodox | 2020 | Overseas |
| 41 | **Seekkuge Prasanna** | Sri Lanka | 27 June 1985 (aged 34) | Right-handed | Right-arm leg break | 2020 | Overseas |
| 96 | **David Wiese** | South Africa | 18 May 1985 (aged 34) | Right-handed | Right-arm fast-medium | 2019 | Overseas |
Wicket-keepers
| 33 | **Dane Vilas** | South Africa | 10 June 1985 (aged 34) | Right-handed | – | 2020 | Overseas. Replacement for Lendl Simmons |
| 43 | Jaahid Ali | Pakistan | 5 March 1995 (aged 24) | Right-handed | Right-arm off break | 2020 | |
| 51 | **Ben Dunk** | Australia | 11 March 1987 (aged 32) | Left-handed | Right-arm off break | 2020 | Overseas |
Bowlers
| 10 | **Shaheen Afridi** | Pakistan | 6 April 2000 (aged 19) | Left-handed | Left-arm fast | 2018 | |
| 14 | **Usman Shinwari** | Pakistan | 1 May 1994 (aged 25) | Right-handed | Left-arm fast | 2020 | |
| 55 | Maaz Khan | Pakistan | 15 December 2000 (aged 19) | Right-handed | Right-arm leg spin | 2020 | |
| 90 | Dilbar Hussain | Pakistan | 20 February 1993 (aged 27) | Right-handed | Left-arm medium-fast | 2020 | |
| 99 | Salman Irshad | Pakistan | 3 December 1995 (aged 24) | Right-handed | Right-arm medium-fast | 2020 | Replacement for Haris Rauf for 3 matches |
| 150 | **Haris Rauf** | Pakistan | 7 November 1993 (aged 26) | Right-handed | Right-arm fast | 2019 | |

== Kit manufacturers and sponsors ==
| Kit manufacturer | Shirt sponsor (chest) | Shirt sponsor (back) | Chest branding | Sleeve branding |
|---|---|---|---|---|
| Millat Sports | Ecostar | Hashmi Ispaghol | Geo News | Mughal Steel |

Playing kit

== Season standings ==
| Pos | Team | Pld | W | L | NR | Pts | NRR |
|---|---|---|---|---|---|---|---|
| 1 | Multan Sultans (3rd) | 10 | 6 | 2 | 2 | 14 | 1.031 |
| 2 | Karachi Kings (C) | 10 | 5 | 4 | 1 | 11 | −0.190 |
| 3 | Lahore Qalandars (R) | 10 | 5 | 5 | 0 | 10 | −0.072 |
| 4 | Peshawar Zalmi (4th) | 10 | 4 | 5 | 1 | 9 | −0.055 |
| 5 | Quetta Gladiators | 10 | 4 | 5 | 1 | 9 | −0.722 |
| 6 | Islamabad United | 10 | 3 | 6 | 1 | 7 | 0.185 |

Source: ESPNcricinfo
- The top four teams qualified for the playoffs
- Advanced to Qualifier
- Advanced to Eliminator 1
