= FM 103 =

FM 103 may refer to:

- Mast FM 103, a Pakistani radio channel
- Farm to Market Road 103

== See also ==
- 103fm, a radio station in Israel
