= Dabang FM 90.4 Attock =

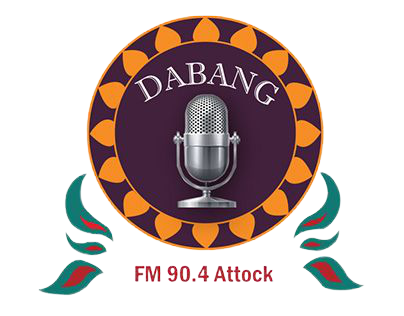
- Attock, Pakistan; Pakistan
- Broadcast area: Attock, Pakistan
- Frequency: 90.4 MHz

Ownership
- Owner: Gasherbrum Pvt Ltd.
- Sister stations: FM 99 Gilgit FM 99 Skardu

Links
- Website: Dabang FM 90.4

Dabang FM 90.4 Attock, commonly known as Dabang FM, is a private FM radio station based in Attock, Pakistan. The radio station is owned and operated by Gasherbrum Pvt Ltd. The company acquired the radio licences of FM 99 Gilgit, FM 99 Skardu & FM 90.4 Attock. Dabang FM 90.4 Attock celebrated its 9th anniversary on 5 February 2025.

== Programming ==
The regular programming includes:

- News
- Current affairs
- Local news
- Health
- Education/awareness
- Talk shows
- Music/entrainment
- Expert opinion
- Local language coverage

== Radio hosts ==
- RJ Syed Asad Kakakhel
- RJ Iqra Bashir
- RJ Sadia Kanwal
- RJ Sohail Khattak
- RJ Karim Khan
- RJ Hajira Khan
- RJ Naseer Ahmad
- RJ Basharat Khan
- RJ Riaz Ahmad Khan
- RJ Mubashir Saleem
- RJ Asfand Yar Khan

== See also ==
- List of Pakistani radio channels
- Radio Pakistan
- List of FM radio stations in Pakistan
