= Power 99 =

Power 99 may refer to:

== Current usages ==
- Power 99 FM Radio 99 Islamabad
- Power 99 FM Radio 99 Abbottabad
- Power 99 FM Radio 99 Vehari
- WUSL-FM (98.9) - Philadelphia, Pennsylvania
- KUJ-FM (99.1) - Kennewick, Washington
- WRKW-FM (99.1) - Ebensburg, Pennsylvania
- CFMM-FM (99.1) - Prince Albert, Saskatchewan

== Former usages ==
- KZGU-FM (99.5) - Mangilao, Guam
- WAPW-FM (99.7) - Atlanta, Georgia (now WWWQ-FM, Q100)
- KCPX-FM (98.7) - Salt Lake City, Utah (now KBEE-FM, B98.7)
- WYGO-FM (98.7) - Corbin, Kentucky (now WKDP-FM)
