= Feica =

Pakistani political cartoonist

- Born: 1957 (age 68–69); Kabirwala, Punjab, Pakistan
- Education: National College of Arts
- Occupation: Political cartoonist
- Years active: 1979–present
- Children: 3

Feica (born 1957) is a Pakistani political cartoonist. He has worked in newspapers and publications of the country, while simultaneously exhibiting his work as a painter and artist since 1979. He is retired and lends his services as an advisor and consultant to various organizations locally and internationally, while also giving visiting lectures at educational institutions.

== Early life and family ==
Feica was born in 1957 in Kabirwala, a town of Khanewal District in the Punjab province of Pakistan. Shortly after birth, his parents along with the rest of his siblings moved to Multan city.

He married in 1995 and has 3 children. He lives with his family in Karachi.

== Education and career ==
Feica graduated from National College of Arts, Lahore in 1979 with a degree in Fine Arts and Painting.

In 1979, he joined The Muslim as cartoonist and then The Star in 1980s during the Zia regime. During his time he was intermittently incarcerated for his criticism of the dictatorship, albeit only for short periods.

While at The Star, he freelanced cartoons for various other publications including Dawn and the Herald. He left The Star in 1986 and joined The Muslim. He joined the Frontier Post in 1987. After working at Frontier Post, he left the country for New York to work with his American counterparts. He stayed at the Columbia University for some time after which he journeyed to the London to work on a project with Jang Media Group. In 1992, soon after returning to Pakistan, he joined Dawn and worked as an Editorial Cartoonist until 2017, moving permanently to Karachi, where he retired from the organization.

In 2001, Feica co-founded a radio station (Mast FM 103). He worked as an advisor and mentor to the organization until 2015.
