= Sahir Lodhi =

Pakistani actor

- ساحر لودھی
- Born: 21 May 1968 (age 58); Karachi, Sindh, Pakistan
- Spouse: Somi Nizami Lodhi
- Relatives: Shaista Lodhi (sister)

Sahir Lodhi is a Pakistani actor, television host, and radio jockey. He made his first TV appearance in Chai Time on Indus TV, which became a hit morning show. Some of his most popular shows include Shair Online, Kuch Tum Kahao Kuch Hum Kahain, Ranjhey Sassi Punoon Heer, Dhorajee, The Sahir Lodhi Show, and Morning Masala. He has also acted in drama serials and single plays, such as Bechrain Gay Abb Kaisay, Bikharnay Say Pehlay, Tum Miyray Ho, Khado Khal, Saheli, and Adhoray Khaab. Lodhi is passionate about radio, especially his program The Sahir Show on Mast FM 103. He made his film debut with Raasta.

== Personal life ==
Sahir Lodhi was born in Karachi to Ali Kazim Lodhi and Roshan Gohar Lodhi. He has two brothers (Amir Lodhi and Tahir Lodhi), and one sister Shaista Lodhi.

== Controversy ==
In 2017, Lodhi attracted widespread criticism when he publicly insulted a guest speaker on his show, who he thought was criticizing Quaid-e-Azam. The host went on a long monologue that has since been questioned as being rehearsed to shut the guest speaker down.

== Filmography ==
=== Film ===
Year	Title	Role	Notes	Ref
2017	Raasta	Sameer	Debut	
TBA	Mausam	TBA	filming	

=== Television shows ===
Show	Channel
Chai Time	Indus TV
Shair Online	Geo TV
The Sahir Lodhi Show	TV One
Morning Masala	News One (Pakistani TV channel)
Aap Ka Sahir	TV One
The Sahir Show	Geo TV
10 Tak Ke Baad With Sahir	Geo TV
Morning With Sahir	A-Plus Entertainment
Subah Savereh Samma Kay Sath	Samaa TV

=== Radio shows ===
Lodhi hosts "It's My Show" on MERA FM 107.4. The show focuses predominantly on entertainment, fun and counselling. Lodhi occasionally invites guests and takes calls. Each episode features a special topic.

== Awards ==
At the 1st Pakistan Media Awards, Lodhi received awards for his TV and radio shows.

- Pakistan Media Awards for TV Show Host (2010)
- Pakistan Media Awards for Best Morning Show (2010)
- Pakistan Media Awards for Best Radio Show (2010)
- Pakistan Media Awards for Best Radio Jockey (2010)
