= FM 101 (Pakistan) =

Pakistani Radio

- Islamabad; Pakistan
- Frequency: 101.00 MHz

Programming
- Languages: Urdu, English
- Format: Entertainment, News, Music
- Network: Radio Pakistan

Ownership
- Owner: Pakistan Broadcasting Corporation
- Sister stations: FM 93 Pakistan

History
- First air date: 1 October 1998
- Former frequencies: 104.0 MHz

Technical information
- Licensing authority: PEMRA
- Transmitter coordinates: 33°43′18.6″N 73°05′59.4″E

Links
- Website: www.fm101.gov.pk

FM 101 is a commercial FM radio station owned by Pakistan Broadcasting Corporation. It broadcasts from Karachi, Hyderabad, Lahore, Islamabad and seven other cities in Pakistan.

== History ==
On 1 October 1998, Radio Pakistan started FM transmission simultaneously from Islamabad, Karachi and Lahore under the title of FM 101, exclusively for entertainment. It mainly broadcasts free-to-air content.

== Network ==
FM 101 is a network of 18 FM stations broadcasting from the following cities in Pakistan.

1. Islamabad
2. Lahore
3. Multan
4. Karachi
5. Quetta
6. Faisalabad
7. Hyderabad
8. Sialkot
9. Peshawar
10. Sargodha
11. Abbottabad

=== Satellite ===
FM 101's transmission is available on Asiasat 3.

=== Internet ===
FM 101's transmission is also available on the web.

== See also ==
- List of Pakistani radio channels
- Radio Pakistan
- List of FM radio stations in Pakistan
- List of radio stations in Asia
- Mast FM
- Hum FM
