= Raasta (2017 film) =

2016 film by Sahir Lodhi

- راستہ
- Directed by: Sahir Lodhi
- Written by: Shahid Naqvi; Sahir Lodhi
- Produced by: Moid Ul Hassan, Dr. Faisal Zia and Sahir Lodhi
- Starring: Sahir Lodhi; Abeer Rizvi; Aijaz Aslam; Mathira; Sana Nawaz; Shamoon Abbasi; Saima Azhar; Saeeda Imtiaz
- Narrated by: Sahir Lodhi
- Cinematography: Nabeel Jawaid Qureshi
- Edited by: Muhammad Irfan, Muhammad Bilal Habib
- Music by: Saji Ali; Kamran Akhtar
- Production companies: Sahir Lodhi Films; Hom Production; Sams Company, TV-1 Films
- Distributed by: IMGC Global Entertainment
- Release date: 31 March 2017
- Running time: 120 min
- Country: Pakistan
- Language: Urdu
- Box office: Rs. 10 lakh

Raasta (Urdu: راستہ; transl. Path) is a 2017 Pakistani action thriller film directed by Sahir Lodhi. It stars Lodhi, Abeer Rizvi, Aijaz Aslam, Shamoon Abbasi, and Naveed Raza in lead roles, alongside Saima Azhar, Mathira and Saeeda Imtiaz in cameo appearances. The film was released on 31 March 2017.

== Synopsis ==
Raasta revolves around two brothers who try to bond and get revenge against the failed political system in Pakistan.

== Cast ==
- Sahir Lodhi as Sameer
- Aijaz Aslam as Inspector Sultan
- Shamoon Abbasi as Shahnawaz Rajpoot
- Naveed Raza as Sherry
- Saima Azhar as Maya
- Abeer Rizvi
- Nadia as Mona
- Esha Noor as Zara
- Sana Nawaz as Bhabi
- Saniya Mansoor as Zoya
- Saleem Mairaj
- Saeeda Imtiaz (Cameo appearance)
- Mathira as Dancer in the Song ''Pee Lay''
- Ramis Khan as SRK

== Production ==
The shooting of the film began in November 2015 and it was shot in Karachi. The details about the film were revealed in November 2015. The film stars Naveed Raza, Sana Nawaz, Aijaz Aslam, Saleem Mairaj, Shamoon Abbasi and Saima Azhar in pivotal roles. Mathira was chosen to make Appearance in an item Song ''Pee Lay''. This is the debut film of the lead actors Sahir Lodhi, Abeer Rizvi and Saima Azhar.

== Soundtrack ==
The soundtrack of Raasta is composed by Kamran Akhtar and Saji Ali.

No	Song	Singer(s)	Duration
1	Dil Faqeer	Rahat Fateh Ali Khan	04:22
2	Meharman	Damiya Farooqi, Nabeel Shaukat Ali	04:03
3	Choti Umariya	Sara Raza Khan, Saji Ali	03:26
4	Dil Faqeer (Techno Mix)	Rahat Fateh Ali Khan	04:27
5	Pee Lay	Saji Ali, Saman Sabri	04:15
6	Raasta (Title Track)	Saji Ali	04:09

== Release ==
The film was released on 31 March 2017 in Pakistan, USA, UK and UAE. The film came out to be a disaster at the box office with low response from audiences, earned only 2.3 million in 5 days and was declared as an expected flop for the makers. Raasta performed poorly and distributors suffered financially. The action-packed movie was taken off from cinemas within 2 weeks due to small audiences.

== Reviews ==
Rafay Mehmood The Express Tribune did not give the film a rating, commenting: "Once you're in it, there is no coming out of the half-hearted action sequences, flat dialogue deliveries and the confusing cathartic experience that Sahir Lodhi directorial tries to offer". Hasham Cheema of Dawn described the film as "hilarious" with high entertainment value and dramatic Scenes, summarising Lodhi's performance: "Unapologetically violent, disproportionately proud, self-righteous, relentless, surreal and Borderline absurd; this film brings together all that I find Profoundly interesting about the Quintessential Pakistani Pop Celebrity."

The movie was heavily criticized and termed a disaster by many critics and bloggers, leading to a public Retort by Lodhi who said their reviews were motivated by personal bias. The Express Tribune quoted a manager of Super Cinemas questioning the distributors' decision to consider the film suitable for public screening, following its performance. However, the manager also added that he provided the Morning, Evening and Night Shows to the film to support Pakistani cinema.
