= Karachi FM =

Radio station in Karachi, Pakistan

- Karachi; Pakistan
- Frequency: 96 MHz

Ownership
- Owner: Vectracom Broadcasting Services (Pvt) Ltd.

History
- First air date: 13 March 2004
- Former names: Radioactive 96 FM (2004–2013)

Links
- Website: Karachi FM

Karachi FM is a radio station broadcasting on 96.0 FM in Karachi, Pakistan. The radio station is owned and operated by Vectracom Broadcasting Services (Pvt.) Ltd.

== History ==
The station was established in 2004 as Radioactive 96 FM. It was owned by Riffat Siddiqi. The station changed its name to Karachi FM in 2013.

== See also ==
- List of radio stations in Pakistan
- City FM 89
- Radio Pakistan
