= Radioactivity (disambiguation) =

Radioactivity is the property of spontaneous nuclear decay, or the frequency of that decay.

Radioactivity may also refer to:

== Entertainment ==
- Radio-Activity, 1975 album by Kraftwerk
- "Radioactivity" (song), by Kraftwerk

== See also ==
- Radioactive (disambiguation)
