= Power Radio FM 99 =

Pakistani Radio

- Islamabad; Pakistan
- Broadcast area: Pakistan
- Frequency: FM 99.00 MHz

Programming
- Languages: Urdu, English
- Format: Entertainment, News, Current Affairs

Ownership
- Owner: The Communicators (Pvt) Ltd.

History
- First air date: 23 March 2003

Links
- Website: power99.live

Power Radio FM 99 , commonly known as Power 99, is a private FM radio station based in Islamabad, Pakistan. It is a project of The Communicators.

== History ==
Power99 was founded by Najeeb Ahmed and is currently owned by a group known as The Communicators. It is currently running its transmission from Islamabad, Abbottabad and Vehari. Power99 got its license from the Federal Government of Pakistan under Pakistan Electronic Media Regulatory Authority (PEMRA) and started its transmission from 23 March 2003.

Power99 started its transmission within three months of obtaining a license from PEMRA. Its transmitter is currently installed at A-Block Blue Area, in Islamabad. Power99 covers an aerial radius of approximately 70 km which enables it to cover all big and small cities and towns in and around Islamabad.

== Programs ==
Some of the programs on Power99 include

- Hemat Javan Hai
- Broad Class - Listen to Learn
- Sada e Jahan (RNN)
- Sportage (Sports Magazine)
- Suno Moto (RNN)
- News Bulletins Every Hour (RNN)
- News Round Up (RNN)
- Tang Takor - Pashto
- Power Drive Time
- Tea Time with U.S
- Hymns to the Silence
- Yaadon Kay Dareechay
- Lost in History
- Rajay Oran Dey Dadaye
- Dari & Pashto Show
- Aap Ka Waqt Aap Key Liye
- The Town Talk
- Mind Your Media
- Crazy Afternoon
- Whats UP
- Power Evenings
- Bachon Ka 99
- Pichlay Pehar
- Meri Khamoshi Ko Beyan Milay (RNN)
- Manzar (RNN)
- Mazboot Rishtay (RNN))

== Radio hosts ==
- Anila Ansari

== Management ==
- Najib Ahmed
- Fakhira Najib

== Partners ==
- Power99 Foundation
- RNN (Radio News Network)

== Stations ==
- Islamabad Station
- Abbottabad Station
- Vehari Station

== See also ==
- List of Pakistani radio channels
- List of FM radio stations in Pakistan
- List of radio stations in Asia
- Pakistan Electronic Media Regulatory Authority
