= Radio Active (Sweden) =

Radio station based in Ystad, Sweden

Radio Active is a radio station based in Ystad Sweden. Founded in 1995, it broadcasts in FM on a frequency of 103.9 MHz, as well as online.
