= FM 100 Pakistan =

Pakistani Radio

- Pakistan
- Broadcast area: Karachi; Lahore; Islamabad; Hyderabad; Rahim Yar Khan; Multan; Abbottabad; Gujrat; Jhelum
- Frequency: 100 MHz

Programming
- Language: Urdu

Ownership
- Owner: Lahore Broadcasting Corporation

History
- First air date: March 23, 1995

Links
- Website: Official website

FM 100 is a radio station in Pakistan broadcasting in nine cities, which include Karachi, Lahore, Islamabad, Hyderabad, Rahim Yar Khan, Gujrat, Jhelum, Abbottabad, and Multan. It was founded on March 23, 1995, and has a listening area covering most urban centres. It was the first commercial radio station in Pakistan, providing live entertainment programs around the clock to promote Pakistani music among the population.

Its slogan is "Assalam-o-Alaikum Pakistan," which means "May Peace be on Pakistan."

== History ==
FM 100 was established in 1994 and started its regular transmission on March 23, 1995. In the early days, it broadcast in three cities (Karachi, Lahore, and Islamabad). In 2012, it expanded its network to include Hyderabad and Rahim Yar Khan and in 2014 added Gujrat, Jhelum, Abbottabad, and Multan. As of January 2022, it planned to launch stations in Shikarpur, Jacobabad, and Benazirabad soon.

== Programming ==
Its regular programming includes religious programs, daily five-time prayers, Friday prayer sermons, national and international days coverage, special events coverage, talk shows, youth shows, kids slots, sports roundup, IT-related programs, along with the latest Pakistani pop, folk, and film music as well as Western music.
