= Ravi Bopara =

English cricketer (born 1985)

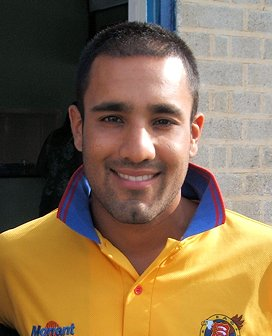

Personal information
- Full name: Ravinder Singh Bopara
- Born: 4 May 1985 (age 41); Forest Gate, London
- Height: 5 ft 9 in (1.75 m)
- Batting: Right-handed
- Bowling: Right-arm medium
- Role: Batting all-rounder

International information
- National side: England (2007–2015)
- Test debut (cap 637): 1 December 2007 v Sri Lanka
- Last Test: 19 July 2012 v South Africa
- ODI debut (cap 202): 2 February 2007 v Australia
- Last ODI: 13 March 2015 v Afghanistan
- ODI shirt no.: 10
- T20I debut (cap 39): 13 June 2008 v New Zealand
- Last T20I: 7 September 2014 v India

Domestic team information
- Years: Team
- 2002–2019: Essex (Note: Not every team that Bopara has played for is listed here. Only teams which he appeared for in more than one season are included in the list.) (squad no. 25)
- 2009–2010: Kings XI Punjab
- 2010/11, 2012/13: Dolphins
- 2015, 2022: Sylhet Strikers
- 2016–2019: Karachi Kings
- 2017–2019: Rangpur Riders (squad no. 10)
- 2020–2023: Sussex (squad no. 23)
- 2021–2024: London Spirit (squad no. 23)
- 2024–: Northamptonshire (squad no. 25)
- 2024-2025: Chitwan Rhinos (squad no. 25)

Head coaching information
- Years: Team
- 2025: Karachi Kings

Career statistics
Competition	Test	ODI	FC	LA
Matches	13	120	221	325
Runs scored	575	2,695	12,821	9,856
Batting average	31.94	30.62	40.44	39.90
100s/50s	3/0	1/14	31/55	15/60
Top score	143	101 *	229	201*
Balls bowled	434	1,860	15,462	8,145
Wickets	1	40	257	248
Bowling average	290.00	38.07	36.50	29.18
5 wickets in innings	0	0	3	1
10 wickets in match	0	0	0	0
Best bowling	1/39	4/38	5/49	5/63
Catches/stumpings	6/–	35/–	118/–	103/–
- Source: ESPNcricinfo, 26 August 2025

Ravinder Singh Bopara (born 4 May 1985) is an English cricketer who plays for Northamptonshire and has represented the England national team. Originally a top-order batsman, his developing medium pace bowling has made him a batting all rounder in the one day game. Bopara has also played for Karachi Kings in the Pakistan Super League, Kings XI Punjab in the Indian Premier League, Sydney Sixers in the Big Bash League, and Chittagong Vikings in the Bangladesh Premier League. Bopara was a member of the England team that won the 2010 ICC World Twenty20.

Bopara was first called up to the England One Day International team in 2007, before a difficult Test debut in Sri Lanka saw him dropped in early 2008 after a string of three ducks. He regained his place for a Test against the West Indies in the winter of 2008–09; on his return to the team, Bopara became the fifth batsman to score three consecutive Test centuries for England. Despite this success, during the 2009 Ashes Bopara again struggled and was dropped for the final Test of the series. At the start of the 2016 season he took over the captaincy of the Essex one day team.

== Early days ==
He was born into an immigrant Indian Punjabi Sikh family, educated at Brampton Manor School, East Ham and Barking Abbey School, Bopara attended Frenford Clubs and represented Essex Boys and Girls Clubs in their representative U14 cricket team. Bopara made his first-class debut for Essex in May 2002. In 2003 and 2004, he played several matches for England U-19s, including in the 2004 U-19 Cricket World Cup.

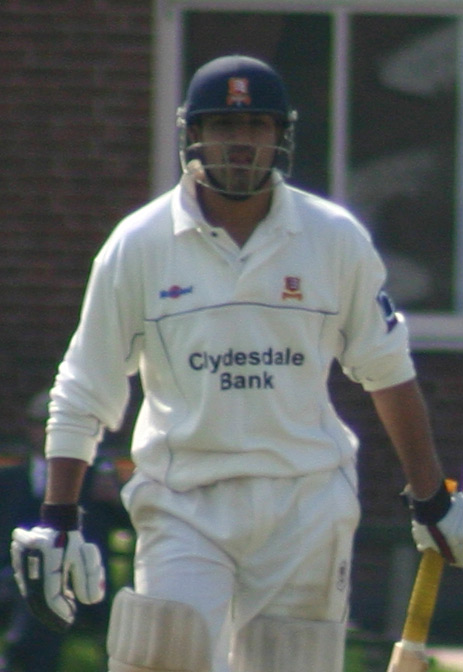
Bopara playing against Cambridge UCCE, April 2005

In the 2005 season, he scored 880 first-class runs, including his first first-class century. He also hit 135 in a non-first-class match against the touring Australians, putting on 270 for the second wicket with Alastair Cook, and in 2006 he was selected for England A in their March tour of the West Indies, as well as their matches against the touring Sri Lankans and Pakistanis in the summer of that year. In July, he was selected in England's 30-man provisional squad for the 2006 Champions Trophy.

== International career ==
=== 2007 World Cup ===
In January 2007 Kevin Pietersen sustained a rib injury in England's first One Day International against Australia, keeping him out of the remainder of the series. Bopara was called up as his replacement, and made his ODI debut on 2 February. Later that month, he was named in the England squad for the 2007 Cricket World Cup, and he played his second ODI in England's second match of that tournament. In England's match against Sri Lanka, Bopara was named man of the match for his 52 off 53 balls, which brought England to within three runs of victory from a seemingly hopeless position. The partnership for the seventh wicket was an English World Cup record and was the second record partnership made by Bopara in the tournament, following his record fifth wicket partnership with Paul Collingwood against Canada.

=== 2007 India and Sri Lanka ===
In the first three games of the limited overs series against India Bopara was ineffectual, not batting in the first game and then making just 27 runs in the next two games combined. On 30 August, in the fourth match of huge series, he featured in a prominent tail end partnership, this time with Stuart Broad as the pair added an unbeaten 99 for the 8th wicket to defeat India at Old Trafford. Bopara finished 43 not out. He could not continue his good form, making just 11 in the next match.

He made his Test debut in the tour to Sri Lanka in December 2007 but had a poor series, scoring only 42 runs in five innings including three ducks, and taking only one wicket at an average of 81. One BBC commentator described him as "well out of his depth at Test level", and Bopara was subsequently selected in the ODI squad but not the Test squad for the tour to New Zealand in early 2008. However, he returned to the Test squad for the fourth Test against South Africa in August 2008, following a good season for Essex in the County Championship.

On 4 June 2008, Bopara recorded his highest List A score in the quarter-finals of the Friends Provident Trophy. He scored an unbeaten 201 runs off 138 balls, including 18 fours and 10 sixes. Bopara's score was just the eighth instance of a double hundred in the history of List A cricket and the highest for six years. On 9 September 2008 Bopara was named in England's 15-man squad for the inaugural Stanford Super Series in Antigua. There, England took on the Middlesex Crusaders and Trinidad and Tobago before facing the Stanford All-Stars on 1 November. The winning players in that match would have earned $1million each, with a further $1million being shared between the four players left out of the team. This never came to fruition, however, as England fell to a heavy defeat in the final. The same day, Bopara was also handed an Increment Contract by the ECB.

=== 2008 New Zealand, South Africa and India ===
Bopara made just three in the first ODI in New Zealand. He made 23 in the next match, but did not bowl in either matches. In the return series in England, Bopara got off to a slow start, making scores of 10 and 27 in his first two matches. However, in the fourth match of the series he made 58 although it wasn't enough to prevent a narrow defeat for England. He made 30 in the final match of the series, leaving him with over 100 runs in the matches he played in.

He played in the first ODI against South Africa but was not required to bat, instead just bowling two overs and conceding 11 runs. England won the match by 20 runs.

He made 54 not out in the first ODI against India as he continued to consolidate himself in the ODI team. In the third match he made 60, although England lost the game by 16 runs. In the final match of the series he took figures of 1–42 as well as contributing 24 runs with the bat, although England again lost, this time by six wickets.

=== 2009 T20 World Cup, West Indies and Australia ===
On 18 February 2009, Bopara, along with Amjad Khan, was invited to join the England Test squad on their tour of the West Indies as cover for Andrew Flintoff who was struggling with a hip injury. He scored 124 not out in a warm up match, earning him a place in the 4th Test against the West Indies. In the first innings he scored his maiden Test century with 104 off 143 balls before being caught. He was dropped for the next Test of the series, however he was re-selected for the first Test of the home series against the West Indies on 6 May. There he scored his second consecutive Test century, scoring 143 runs from 186 balls. He then scored another century in the second Test, becoming only the fifth England player to score three consecutive centuries. He credited his success to his coaching by Graham Gooch at Essex.

Bopara played well in England's opening game of the T20 World Cup, hitting 46 against the Netherlands. He made 37 against India before 55 against the West Indies, although England lost the match by 5 wickets. This meant that England progress no further in the competition despite being on home soil.

Australians Mitchell Johnson and Ricky Ponting stated to local media that during the upcoming 2009 Ashes series they were going to target Bopara in particular.

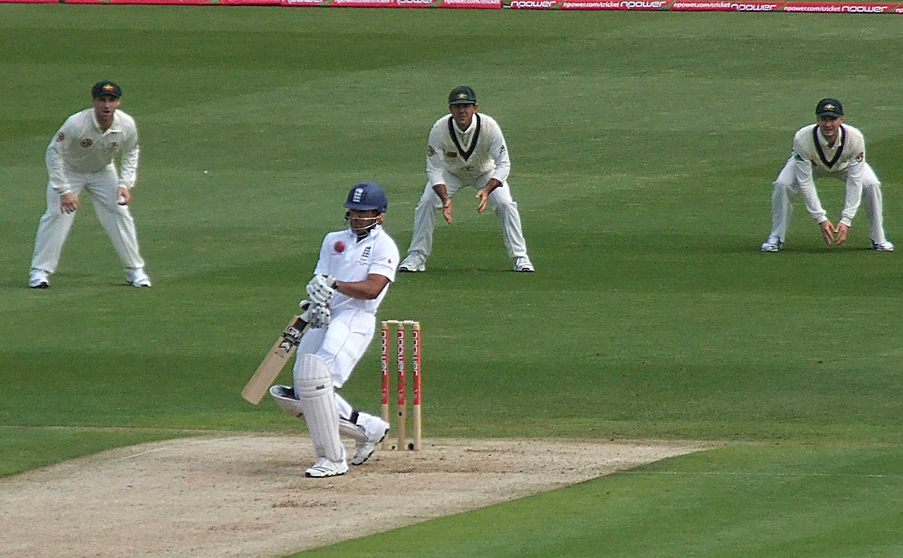
Bopara getting hit in the throat by a bouncer during the first Test of the 2009 Ashes series at the SWALEC Stadium.

On 22 June, the England selectors announced a sixteen-man preliminary Ashes squad for that summer's series; it included Bopara. Cricinfo staff wrote that "Bopara's stock could not be higher". He found success in a warm-up match against Warwickshire, however, scoring 104 while opening with Andrew Strauss.

Bopara struggled during the series, however, with scores of 35, one, 18, 27, 23, one and a duck. He was dismissed by Ben Hilfenhaus in five of his seven innings. Speculation grew about his position for the final Test, where England required a win to regain the Ashes, and it was announced on 16 August that Bopara had been dropped in favour of uncapped Jonathan Trott, who went on to score a century on debut. Bopara returned to Essex and scored 201 against Surrey, and despite being replaced in the Test team remained in England's squads for the ODI series against Australia and the Champions Trophy in September. On 11 September 2009 it was announced that Bopara had been awarded an "incremental contract" with England, as had Trott. However, after the Champions Trophy Bopara did not play ODI cricket for ten months.

=== 2010 Bangladesh and Pakistan ===
Trott kept his Test place after his impressive debut, and Bopara saw Michael Carberry and Eoin Morgan make their Tests debuts in the away and home series against Bangladesh respectively, with Bopara making neither squad. However, some impressive form for Essex in domestic 40-over and Twenty20 cricket in 2010, as well as a century for the England Lions saw him recalled to the ODI team for the series decider against Bangladesh, after an injury to Ian Bell. Bopara hit a late innings of 45 not out from just 16 balls and took career-best ODI bowling figures of 4/38. His convincing performance led to his selection in the two-match T20 series against Pakistan. England won both matches, but Bopara had little impact, making scores of 11 and 12. Despite this, Bopara played in the ODI series, making 35 runs in the first game as England won by 24 runs. England won the next game, although Bopara only made 16 runs. His poor form continued as England suffered defeat in the final game and Bopara scored just 7 runs.

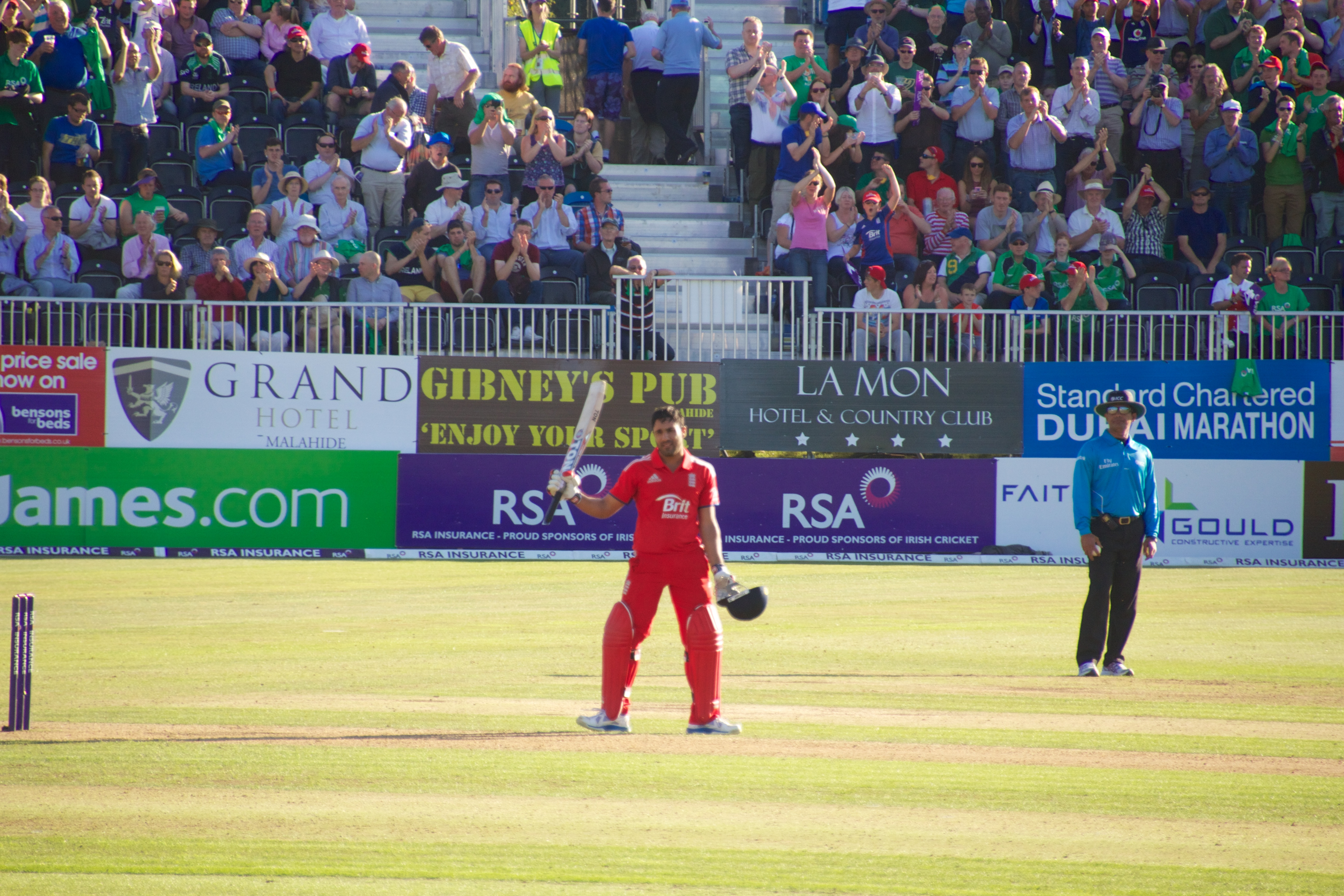
Ravi Bopara celebrates reaching 50 against Ireland, en route to his first One Day International century.

=== 2011 World Cup and India ===
Bopara headed for the West Indies with England Lions in January 2011 after he missed out for the 2010–11 Ashes series Test and ODI squad and the 2011 World Cup. His stay in the Caribbean was cut short when he was called up to England's World Cup squad before the tournament as a replacement for the injured Eoin Morgan. Bopara played in England's opening match against the Netherlands and scored a match-winning 30 from 20 balls. After that, he did not play against India and Ireland as England chose to field a second spinner, Michael Yardy. Bopara returned to play against South Africa in place of the dropped Paul Collingwood. Bopara came in with the score at 15/3 and managed a partnership of 99 with Trott; Bopara ended with 60 off 98 balls. England restricted South Africa to 165 and Bopara was named the man of the match. England lost the next match by two wickets against Bangladesh, with Bopara scoring 16 runs. Bopara did not perform well against the West Indies, making just 4 with the bat, although England went on to win by 18 runs and progress to the quarter-finals. Here, England were thrashed by ten wickets as Sri Lanka's openers made light work of England's target. Bopara scored 31 when he batted in the first innings.

In 2011, Bopara turned down £100,000 to play for the Delhi Daredevils in the IPL as a late replacement for the injured Paul Collingwood. After Collingwood retired from Tests, Bopara and Morgan were the leading contenders to take his place in the team. Bopara, who had already scored two centuries in the County Championship by May, was the favourite but an innings of 193 by Morgan for the England Lions against the touring Sri Lankans kept Bopara out of the Test team. After missing out on the series against Sri Lanka, he returned to the team in August for the third Test against India in place of the injured Trott. However, he could only manage 7 runs despite big scores from England's other batsmen. He kept his place for the next match, this time performing better with an unbeaten 44 as England went on to win the series 4–0 and become the best Test Team in the World.

In the following ODI series with India, Bopara was England's top run scorer with 197. He made 24 in his first game of the series and followed his up with 40 in the next match. In the tied fourth ODI Bopara hit a career-best 96 before being dismissed by Munaf Patel. He finished the series making an unbeaten 37 as England went on to win the series. In the return ODI series in India, Bopara was less effective. He made 8 as England won the first match followed by 36 in the second, which turned out to be his highest score of the series. He made 24 in the third ODI, but only made 8 and 4 in the final matches as England lost the series 3–2. On 23 September 2011, Bopara claimed the best bowling figures by an Englishman in a T20 international with 4/10.

=== 2012 Pakistan and West Indies ===
In the ODI series against Pakistan, Bopara contributed with both bat and ball. After hitting 50 in the first match, he followed this up with 58 in the second match of the series, as England won by 20 runs. He was not required to bat in the final match of the series, as England won the match by 9 wickets.

Despite losing his place in the test team, Bopara continued to play in the One Day and Twenty20 teams. He batted at number 4 in the opening ODI against the West Indies, making just 8. in the second game, he guided England to victory with an unbeaten 19. This gave England a 2–0 lead in the best of three series. In the only T20 International between the two teams, Bopara made 59 and helped England win the game. Throughout the series Bopara had also been used as a bowler, with batsman struggling to score of his medium pacers. Bopara also gained a reputation as a partnership breaker.

=== 2012 Australia and South Africa ===
He was a key player for England in the limited overs series against Australia. He made 82 in the second ODI which led to him receiving the man of the match award. In the fourth game of the series he made 33 to help England win by 8 wickets, before hitting an unbeaten half century in the final match of the series to help England to another convincing victory.

Following his impressive form in limited overs cricket, Bopara was selected to play for the Test team in the opening Test against South Africa. However, he was out for a duck in the first innings as England slumped to defeat. Bopara was replaced by James Taylor for the second Test. Bopara returned for the ODI Series, making 16 in the second ODI. Although he was dismissed for a duck in the third game, he took 1–31 of ten overs to help England level the series. However, he continued to struggle with the bat, making 16 runs in the next two matches. Bopara continues to be used to bowl overs, as he continued to be economical and pick up occasional wickets.

Bopara was left out of the T20 team that toured India in 2013. He also went on to play no part in the ODI series, with the likes of Samit Patel and Chris Woakes being preferred instead. This was largely due to Bopara's poor form with the bat. Bopara was again overlooked for the T20 series against New Zealand. Bopara again missed out on selection for the ODI team against New Zealand, with many suggesting that his international was now over.

=== 2013 Champions Trophy and Australia ===
Bopara returned to the England team for the 2013 Champions Trophy, now batting in the number 6 position. He made an unbeaten 46 against Australia to help guide England to victory. In the second game he was again unbeaten, making 33 and also bowled six overs. However, in a close game Sri Lanka won meaning England had to win their last game to qualify. They did so after beating New Zealand, with Bopara taking 2–26 in a low scoring match. England convincingly beat South Africa in the semi-final, with Bopara not being required to bat. In the final against India, Bopara took figures of 3–20 and also made 30 during a big partnership with Eoin Morgan, However, once the pair were out the England innings fell apart and India went on to lift the trophy.

Following his good performance in the Champions Trophy, Bopara kept his place in the England squad for the ODI series against New Zealand. He played in the hard ODI, making 28 and bowling 6 overs for just 21 runs. England went on to win the match but lose the series. In the T20 series he made an unbeaten 30 in the first game, but was expensive with the ball. England went on to lose the match. Although Bopara was selected for the second ODI, the game was rained off.

Although Bopara never played in the Ashes series, he played in the two T20 Internationals. In the first match, which England lost, he scored 45 and participated in an impressive partnership with Joe Root. Bopara played in the second match which England won to tie the series. With many Test players rested for the ODI Series, Bopara was one of the most experienced players in the squad. He took 2–57 in the second ODI, and made 62 in the final match of the series. Throughout the series, Bopara was used to finish off the innings by accelerating towards the end. Bopara also bowled in long spells instead of the occasional spell.

Bopara joined up with the England squad for the tour of Australia for the limited overs series, after the Test team had already lost 5–0. Things did not get much better in the ODI series, as they went on to lose 4–1. During the series, Bopara made 19 in the first match, before making a quick fire 26 in the second. He also took his first wicket of the tour in the second match. He then made 21 in the third match, before making 3 in the fourth, which turned out to be England's only win on the tour. He was stumped on the final match when on 25. He played in all three of the T20 games, scoring 65 from 27 balls in the first match although England lost by 13 runs. In the next two games he only managed 10 runs as England lost the series 3–0.

=== 2014 West Indies, T20 World Cup and Sri Lanka ===
In the limited overs tour of the West Indies, Bopara made scores of 23, 38 not out and 5 not out. This gave him an impressive average of 66. Bopara bowled just 5 overs in the series, taking 1 wicket. In the T20 series, Bopara hit 42 in the first game, although England went on to lose. He made 14 in England's score of 152 in the second, although it ended in another defeat. He made an unbeaten 6 in the final game to help England avoid a whitewash, instead losing the series 2–1.

In the 2014 T20 World Cup, Bopara scored an unbeaten 24 against New Zealand, although England lost the match. He made 11 not out against Sri Lanka and helped finish the game off with Alex Hales to keep England's hopes of qualification alive. He made 31 in the defeat to South Africa, and took figures of 0–13 in his two overs. Bopara could only make 18 in the humiliating defeat against the Netherlands, although he bowled impressively, taking 0–15 in his four overs at an economy rate of less than 4 an over. In the entire tournament, Bopara bowled 6 overs for just 28 runs, and also scored 84 runs, making him one of England's stand out performers.

Bopara was poor in his first three matches against Sri Lanka. He managed just 10 runs and took just one wicket. He made 51 in the fourth match of the series but could not prevent an England defeat, before being dismissed for 17 in the final match as England again lost, and also lost the series 3–2.

Bopara was left out of the ODI squad against India, which drew criticisms from many pundits. He returned for the T20 between he two teams, making 21 runs as England secured a narrow victory.

Bopara returned to the England ODI squad for the tour against Sri Lanka. He made two fifties in the first two matches of the tour, hitting 65 in the first match and 51 in the second. Despite this, England lost both games. In the third ODI he only made six runs, although he did take his first wicket of the series. He made 22 in the fourth match and followed this up by making28 in the fifth ODI, a game England won to keep the series alive. In the sixth ODI of the series, Bopara could only make 13 as England lost the match which meant they could no longer win the series. Bopara was dropped for the final game of tour, but England lost this match to lose the series 5–2.

=== 2015 Tri-series and World Cup ===
Bopara endured a poor Tri series against India and Australia. He scored 13 in the first game against Australia as England suffered a defeat, and was not required to bat as England comfortably beat India in the next game. He scored seven against Australia as England again lost, and made four as England beat India to reach the final. He made his biggest score of the series in the final, making 33 in a losing cause against Australia. Bopara also failed to take a wicket in the series.

Bopara did not play in the World Cup until the final game against Afghanistan, by which point England had already been eliminated from the competition. He picked up figures of 2–31 and was not needed to bat as England won by nine wickets.

== T20 franchise career ==
Bopara played for the team Karachi Kings in Pakistan Super League (PSL) held at UAE in February 2016. The captaincy for the Karachi Kings was handed down to him after Shoaib Malik stepped down from the role. His team finished fourth overall. He won the player of the series award for the PSL 2016 by making 329 runs and taking 11 wickets within 9 matches for the Karachi Kings.

In September 2018, he was named in Balkh's squad in the first edition of the Afghanistan Premier League tournament. In July 2019, he was selected to play for the Glasgow Giants in the inaugural edition of the Euro T20 Slam cricket tournament. However, the following month the tournament was cancelled. In September 2019, he was named in the squad for the Durban Heat team for the 2019 Mzansi Super League tournament. In November 2019, he was selected to play for the Rajshahi Royals in the 2019–20 Bangladesh Premier League. In January 2022, he played for Sylhet Sunrisers in the 2022 BPL. He is playing for Chitwan Rhinos since 2024 at Nepal Premier League.
