= MERA FM 107.4 =

Pakistani radio station

- Karachi Lahore Islamabad Peshawar Sialkot Bahawalpur; Pakistan
- Frequency: 107.4 MHz
- Branding: MERA FM 107.4

Programming
- Languages: Urdu; English

Ownership
- Owner: Project Implementation Managers Private Limited

History
- First air date: December 25, 2012

Links
- Website: https://www.merafm.com/

MERA FM 107.4, formerly known as Samaa FM, is a radio station in Pakistan, covering Karachi, Lahore, Islamabad, Peshawar, Sialkot and Bahawalpur with its transmission.

== History ==
Launched in 2012 as Samaa FM, the radio station is owned by Project Implementation Managers Private Limited. Previously, it was known as FM104.

In November 2021, the station rebranded itself from Samaa FM to MERA FM.

== Shows ==
- The Sunrise Show - Adeel Azhar – 07:00 – 09:00
- Coffee Mornings - Sulmeen Ansari – 21:00 – 23:00

== Awards ==
At the 4th Pakistan Media Awards, two of the station's RJs Adeel Azhar and Sulmeen Ansari bagged the Best Male and Female RJ Awards, respectively.

As per research and analysis by GroupM Pakistan, RJ Sahir Lodhi was the people's choice as the Favorite RJ. A study by Radio Score MERA FM as Pakistan's No.1 radio station for the RJ-based category.

According to another research by Media Miles, MERA FM 107.4 was the top most advertised station with 18% share of minutes advertised in Karachi, Lahore and Islamabad.
