= Brighto Paints =

Pakistani paint manufacturer

- Company type: Private
- Industry: Chemicals
- Founded: 1973 in Lahore, Pakistan
- Founder: Khawaja Riaz Ahmed Sikka (Late)
- Headquarters: Lahore, Pakistan
- Area served: Pakistan, Qatar, Afghanistan, U.A.E, Oman, Africa, Saudi Arabia
- Products: Basic and industrial chemicals, decorative paints, industrial (re)finishing products, coatings
- Revenue: Rs1.2 billion (2013)
- Number of employees: 600+ (2022)
- Subsidiaries: Brighto Chemicals, Brighto Services
- Website: www.brightopaints.com

Brighto Paints is a Pakistani paints manufacturing company headquartered in Lahore, Pakistan. Its products include basic and industrial chemicals, decorative paints, industrial (re)finishing products, coatings etc.

In 2012, Brighto Paints was awarded the International Quality Crown Award in the Gold Category in London. In 2021, the company was announced to be the title sponsor of a test series between South Africa and Pakistan.
