= Muhammad Masroor =

Pakistani cricket player

Personal information
- Born: August 6, 1975 (age 51); Karachi , Pakistan
- Batting: Right-handed
- Bowling: Right-arm offbreak

Domestic team information
- Years: Team
- 1994/95–2004/05: Karachi
- 1996/97: Pakistan Customs
- 2008/09–2009/10: Sui Southern Gas Corporation

Muhammad Masroor (Urdu:محمد مسرور) (born August 6, 1975) is a Pakistani former domestic cricketer and a Level 3 qualified coach. Before taking up coaching as a full-time job with PCB in 2012, he played first class cricket in Pakistan for thirteen years and league cricket in England for another nine.

== Playing career ==
Masroor played in 55 first class games in his career from 1995 to 2008. He scored 2,418 runs at an average of 28.11 with three centuries and 14 half-centuries. Masroor also occasionally bowled, taking 5 wickets at an average of 35.60 and an economy rate of 2.96 with his best figures being 3/14.

Masroor played league cricket for Alder Cricket Club in England for eight years. His name was included in the club's Hall of Fame for getting nine wickets for 47 runs in a one-day game. He also played in the Dhaka Premier League for Brothers Union Club from 2001 until 2003.

== Coaching career ==
After retiring from cricket, Masroor took up coaching. In 2011 he was appointed as the head coach of Karachi Dolphins in RBS T20 Tournament where his team finished as runners up. In 2015 he was appointed as assistant coach of Pakistan Under 16 tour to Australia where his team won against Australia. He won the Tri Nation Series in 2016 as the head coach of Pakistan Under 19. He holds the titles of the National Under 16 championships for four consecutive years. He coached the Sindh under-19 team to the National under-19 three-day and one-day titles. He also coached the Pakistan Under 19s in the 2016 Under-19 World Cup where they finished 5th. He was the assistant coach in Emerging Asia Cup in 2018. He was the head coach of the Pakistan Under-16 Tour of Australia in 2018. He has been the fielding coach of Karachi Kings in Pakistan Super League from 2017 till 2020. After this he then became the assistant coach of Northern cricket team. In 2021 after Mohammad Wasim left his role as Northern head coach, Masroor was appointed interim head coach of Northern for the 2020-21 Pakistan Cup. Ahead of the 21–22 season, Masroor moved to Sindh where he is their current assistant coach.
