= Mast FM 103 =

Pakistani radio station

Mast FM
- Lahore, Karachi, Faisalabad & Multan; Pakistan
- Frequency: 103 MHz

Programming
- Languages: Urdu, English
- Format: Music & Shows

Ownership
- Owner: Imran Bajwa
- Sister stations: FM 101

History
- First air date: 2004

Links
- Website: mast103.com

Mast FM or FM 103 is a Pakistani radio channel broadcast from the frequency 103 MHz.

It is a music radio station that also broadcasts some talks shows where the host and the guests discuss a range of specific topics.

== History ==
FM 103 was founded in 2004 by Imran Bajwa. In 2005, it was raided by PEMRA officials for airing critical coverage of 2005 Pakistan earthquake and ordered to stop relaying BBC Urdu news coverage.

== Popular shows ==
Some of its popular shows are:

- Lok Lehar, Afzal Sahir
- The Late Night Horror Show - Minhaj Ali Askari
- M for Mohsin, V for Visaal - Mohsin Nawaz & Visaal
- Saturday night party - Sharaf Qaisar
- Sunday night show - Sharaf Qaisar
- Heer Ranjha Loaded - Shahaan Shaukat and Aira Khan

Mon to Tue night show - schezad shah

- 12 se 2 ki last local - Ehsan ul haq
- 12 bajay ki love story - Jahanzaib Zebi

== Awards ==
- Brand of the Year (2009)

== See also ==
- List of radio channels in Pakistan
- Hum FM
- FM 101
