= Radio Pakistan =

Pakistan National Radio Broadcaster

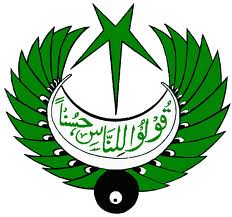
- The current logo of Radio Pakistan
- Native name: شرکت نشریات پاکستان
- Type: Statutory corporation
- Industry: Mass media
- Predecessor: Pakistan Broadcasting Service; Radio Pakistan
- Founded: Radio Pakistan: 14 August 1947; 78 years ago in Lahore, Punjab, Pakistan; PBC: 20 December 1972; 53 years ago in Islamabad, Pakistan
- Headquarters: Islamabad Lahore Faisalabad
- Area served: Pakistan; Central Asia; Far East Asia; Middle East; South Asia; Parts of Eastern Europe
- Key people: Saeed Ahmed Sheikh (Director General)
- Products: Broadcasting; Radio; Web portals
- Services: Radio Pakistan (Broadcast); News and Current Affair (Radio Pakistan); FM 101 (music); FM 93
- Owner: Government of Pakistan (MoIB)
- Website: radio.gov.pk

The Pakistan Broadcasting Corporation (Urdu: شرکت نشریات پاکستان); also known as Radio Pakistan, serves as the national public broadcaster for radio in Pakistan. Although some local stations predate its founding, it is the oldest existing broadcasting network in Pakistan. The network was established on 14 August 1947, following Pakistan's independence from Britain. On 20 December 1972 its character was changed to a statutory body governed by a board of directors and led by a Director General. Radio is broadcast through FM, AM and shortwave radio frequencies. Select programming is also available through WRN.

PBC offers programming in Urdu and English on its national radio broadcasts, while offering programming in 23 different regional languages on its domestic radio service. Its external services are broadcast eight hours daily in 10 different foreign languages, covering the Middle East, Central Asia, South Asia, the Far East Asia and parts of Eastern Europe. PBC has employed commercial advertising on its broadcasts to supplement its federal funding since its inception.

== Mandate ==
The Pakistan Broadcasting Corporation Act, 1973. was enacted...

...to provide for the establishment of a broadcasting corporation, to ensure effective operation and growth of broadcasting as a function-oriented public service medium, general improvement in the quality of programmes, speedy, implementation of projects and better utilisation of talent, and for matters connected therewith;

The functions of the corporation as outlined in the act are:

- to be made available throughout Pakistan for the purposes of disseminating information, education and entertainment,
- to reflect Pakistan and its regions to national and regional audiences,
- to actively contribute to the flow and exchange of cultural expression and Islamic Ideology,
- to be in all languages, reflecting the different needs and circumstances of each official language community,
- to strive for national unity, principles of democracy, freedom, equality, tolerance and social justice.

== Management ==
In accordance with PBC's Act subsequent amendment through a Presidential Ordinance in 2024, a board of directors is responsible for the management of the Pakistan Broadcasting Corporation. The general management of PBC is in the hands of a director general, who now is appointed by the Federal Government on the recommendation of Board. In total, the board is made up of 18 members, out of which 11 are Independent Directors hailing from private sector and 7 ex-officio members including the director general. The composition of the Board is as follows:

- Secretary Ministry of Information, Broadcasting & National Heritage
- One eminent media personality from each province, one each from Islamabad, Azad Kashmir and Gilgit Baltistan and two others appointed by the Government of Pakistan (4).
- Additional Foreign Secretary
- Additional Secretary Finance
- Director General, ISPR
- Managing Director, PTVC
- Director General, PBC
- Representative of the Interior Division

== History ==
Radio Pakistan was originally known as the Pakistan Broadcasting Service at the time of its inception on 14 August 1947. It had the honour of publicly announcing Pakistan's independence from Britain on 13 August 1947 at 11:59 pm. Mustafa Ali Hamdani made the announcement from Lahore in Urdu and English, while Abdullah Jan Maghmoom made the announcement from Peshawar in Pashto.

The announcement was heard as follows:

السلام علیکم۔
پاکستان براڈکاسٹنگ سروس۔ ہم لاہور سے بول رہے ہیں۔ تیرا اور چودہ اگست، سنہ سینتالیس عیسوی کی درمیانی رات۔ بارہ بجے ہیں۔ طلوع صبح آزادی۔

The English translation of this announcement is as follows:

Greetings. Pakistan Broadcasting Service. We are speaking from Lahore. The night between the thirteenth and fourteenth of August, year forty-seven AD. It is twelve o'clock. Dawn of Freedom.

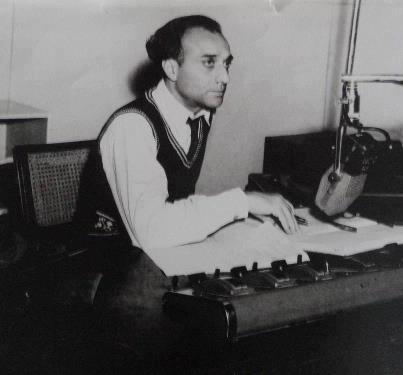
Mustafa Ali Hamdani

== Overview ==
According to Agha Nasir, one of the pioneers of Radio Pakistan, three radio stations at Dhaka (established in 1939), Lahore (1937) and Peshawar Radio Station (1935) existed at the time of independence of Pakistan on 14 August 1947. There was no radio station in the capital of Pakistan, Karachi in 1947. On a high priority basis, a major program of expansion saw new stations opened at Karachi and Rawalpindi in 1948, and a new broadcasting house at Karachi in 1950. This was followed by new stations at Hyderabad (1951), Quetta (1956), a second station at Rawalpindi (1960) and a Receiving Centre at Peshawar (1960). In 1970, training facilities were opened in Islamabad and a station opened at Multan.

A 1973 law, signed by Zulfikar Ali Bhutto (President and later prime minister) mandated the Pakistan Broadcasting Corporation (PBC) "to publish, circulate, distribute and regulate (reliable and trusted) news and information in any part of the world in any manner that may be deemed fit".

One of its core missions is to "bring to public awareness the whole range of significant activity and to present news or events in as factual‚ accurate and impartial a manner as possible." It was converted into Pakistan Broadcasting Corporation on 20 December 1972 as a statutory body governed by a board of directors and Director General. The Radio Pakistan World Service was established on 21 April 1973. The service reached the remotest parts of Pakistan with stations at Gilgit (1977) and Skardu (1977) in the far north and Turbat (1981) in the far southwest. From 1981 to 1982 stations, and transmitters were also established at Dera Ismail Khan, Khuzdar and Faisalabad. Radio Pakistan opened a new broadcasting house in Khairpur on 7 May 1986, followed by relay stations in 1989 at Sibi and on 21 March 1991 in Abbottabad.

The remoter parts of the country began to receive coverage with new stations opened in the 1990s at Chitral, Loralai and Zhob. In 1997, the Federal Minister of Information inaugurated the computerisation of the PBC news processing system and availability of the news bulletins on the Internet in text and audio form. FM 101 Channel of PBC was launched on 1 October 1998 having stations at Islamabad, Lahore and Karachi and now this channel have nine stations throughout Pakistan and is the biggest FM Radio network of Pakistan. In October 1998, Radio Pakistan started FM transmission and over the period 2002–2005, new FM stations were opened at Islamabad, Gwadar, Mianwali, Sargodha, Kohat, Bannu and Mithi.

In the last two and a half years, three new networks have been launched by PBC. On 28 August 2008, PBC launched National Broadcasting Service (NBS) the first dedicated Current Affairs Channel. It is a combination of 5 (100 KW) AM transmitters permanently linked together to broadcast a single national program beamed across Pakistan. Islamabad, Peshawar, Lahore, Quetta and Karachi are the main stations generating the national programming. It is a 17 hours programming on major national and international issues, target audience and literary and cultural programs. PBC launched a new Community FM channel after February 2009 Station Directors Conference. The network is called FM-93 Network with 22 stations across Pakistan. Gilgit, Muzaffarabad, Mirpur, Abbottabad, Chitral, Bannu, Kohat, Dera Ismail Khan, Sargodha, Mianwali, Faisalabad, Lahore, Multan, Larkana, Khairpur, Bhit Shah, Hyderabad, Mithi, Karachi and Gwadar transmit the FM 93 network. On 14 November, PBC launched its first English Music Channel in Islamabad called Planet 94. The network operates on FM 94. The second and third stations of the English channel are soon to start their transmissions from Lahore and Karachi.

== Languages ==
Radio Pakistan broadcasts are in 34 languages: Urdu, Punjabi, Sindhi, Balochi, Seraiki, Potowari, Pashto, Hindko, Kohistani, Khowar, Kashmiri, Gojri, Burushaski, Balti, Shina, Wakhi, Hazargi, Brahvi, English, Chinese, Dari, Persian, Hindi, Gujarati, Tamil, Sinhala, Nepali, Russian, Turkish, Arabic, and Bengali.

== Radio channels ==
=== News & Current Affairs Channel ===
News and Current Affairs Channel was launched by Pakistan Broadcasting Corporation in November 2000 and was converted into National Broadcasting Service in 2008. It broadcasts 16 hours of programmes from 7:00 AM to 11:00 PM (PKT) daily from Islamabad and 8 hours daily from the Provincial Headquarters. Frequencies:

- Islamabad – 1152 kHz
- Lahore – 1332 kHz
- Karachi – 639 kHz
- Quetta – 756 kHz
- Peshawar 1170 kHz
- 3999.75 MHz on Satellite Pak Sat1R

=== FM 107 (Apna Karachi) ===
FM-107 / Ballay Ballay FM (Roshan Media) was established in 2002

=== Other ===
- FM 107 (Apna Karachi)
- Ballay Ballay FM (Roshan Media)
- FM 93
- Central Production Unit
- Dhanak FM 94
- Saut ul Qur'an FM 93.4

== See also ==
- List of radio channels in Pakistan
- List of television channels in Pakistan
- Pakistan Television
- FM 101
