= Radioactive Man =

Radioactive Man may refer to:

- Radioactive Man (comics), a supervillain in Marvel Comics
- Radioactive Man (The Simpsons), a comic book superhero in The Simpsons
  - Radioactive Man, a comic book series starring the above The Simpsons character
  - "Radioactive Man" (The Simpsons episode), an episode of The Simpsons
- Radioactive Man (musician), a recording pseudonym of British dance producer Keith Tenniswood
