= Karachi Kings =

Karachi-based cricket franchise in the Pakistan Super League

- کراچی کنگز
- League: Pakistan Super League

Personnel
- Captain: David Warner
- Coach: Ravi Bopara
- Bowling coach: Shaun Tait
- Owner: Salman Iqbal

Team information
- City: Karachi, Pakistan
- Founded: 2015; 11 years ago
- Home ground: National Stadium
- Capacity: 30,000

History
- PSL wins: 1 (2020)
- Official website: karachikings.com.pk
T20I kit

The Karachi Kings (Urdu: کراچی کنگز) are a professional Twenty20 cricket team that competes in the Pakistan Super League (PSL). The team is based in Karachi, the provincial capital of Sindh, and was formed in 2015 by the Pakistan Cricket Board (PCB). The team's home ground is the National Stadium.

The team is currently captained by David Warner, who was appointed ahead of the 2025 edition.

Kings won their first PSL title in PSL V after beating their arch-rivals Lahore Qalandars in the final on 17 November 2020.

The leading run-scorer for the team is Babar Azam, while Mohammad Amir is the leading wicket-taker.

== Franchise history ==
On 3 December 2015, the PCB announced the owners of the initial five city-based franchises. The Karachi franchise was sold to the ARY Media Group for US$26 million for a ten-year period, making it the most expensive franchise in the tournament at the time. However, in 2017, new franchise Multan Sultans replaced Karachi Kings as the most expensive team in PSL history after the team was sold for US$41.6 million for an eight-year agreement.

In November 2025, following the conclusion of the original ten-year contract, the franchise renewed its rights for another decade (2026–2035). The renewal was part of a league-wide re-evaluation conducted by Ernst & Young, which shifted the financial model from US dollars to Pakistani Rupees. Under the new agreement, the annual franchise fee for Karachi Kings was set at Rs. 640 million.

=== 2016 season ===
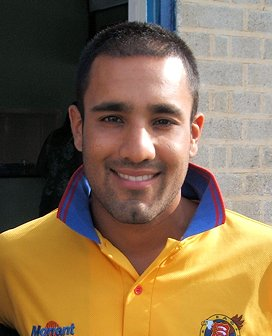
Ravi Bopara was the player of the tournament in the 2016 PSL, after achieving superb batting and bowling performances.

The Kings kicked off their campaign with an easy win against the Lahore Qalandars at the Dubai International Cricket Stadium, with Mohammad Amir getting a hat-trick.

The Kings only won one more match during the group stage of the tournament, finishing with two wins and six losses. They finished fourth in the league table, ahead of Lahore Qalandars on net run rate, and qualified for the league play-off stage.

Ravi Bopara replaced Shoaib Malik as the team captain ahead of the qualifier match against Islamabad United. After being restricted to their lowest score of the tournament (111), Karachi were defeated by nine wickets in the 15th over and were eliminated from the tournament.

=== 2017 season ===
Kumar Sangakkara and Babar Azam joined Karachi for the second season of the PSL whilst Azhar Mehmood signed on as a coach. Sohail Tanvir was traded for Chris Gayle of the Lahore Qalandars during the off-season trade window. During the 2017 PSL players draft, Karachi retained Shoaib Malik, Imad Wasim, Ravi Bopara, Mohammad Amir, Sohail Khan, Saifullah Bangash, and Shahzaib Hasan. The team added nine players to the squad, including Kieron Pollard, Mahela Jayawardena and Ryan McLaren.

In their first game, Karachi Kings lost to Peshawar Zalmi by 7 wickets in a one-sided affair that saw them post a total of just 118 runs in their 20 overs. In the following game, against the Quetta Gladiators, the Kings failed to defend 160 and lost by 7 wickets yet again. Even as the tournament progressed to Sharjah, the Kings continued their losing streak. The Kings then lost to Lahore Qalandars in a closely fought match, and a partnership of 101 runs between veterans Kumar Sangakkara and Shoaib Malik almost won it for the Kings. But in the end they fell short of the target of 180 by 7 runs. In the next game, against defending champions Islamabad United, the team finally managed to put themselves on the points table. The win came through the Duckworth-Lewis method as the Kings were ahead of the par score by 8 runs when returning rain forced to abandon the already 13-over match. In their final game of the Sharjah leg, the Kings continued their winning streak to get past Peshawar Zalmi in a thrilling contest. Setting up a target of 175, the Kings had the Zalmis reduced to 69–6 before Shahid Afridi and Darren Sammy combined in a 70-run partnership that almost won the game for the Zalmis. However, the Kings' bowling prevailed in the end to give their team a 9-run victory.

As the tournament moved back to Dubai, the Kings couldn't continue their winning streak and lost to table-toppers, Quetta Gladiators, by 6 wickets. Batting first, the Kings set a target of 155 runs, which they were unable to defend despite a three-wicket over from pacer Sohail Khan. This loss pushed the Karachi Kings to the bottom of the table once again. However, in the next game, which had become a must-win for both participating teams, the Kings managed to prevail over their rivals the Lahore Qalandars in a thrilling last-ball finish. Chasing 156, the team required 10 runs from the last two balls, which Kieron Pollard surpassed with back-to-back sixes to keep his team alive in the tournament.

Karachi then had to protect their net run rate in the very next league match, against Islamabad United, to qualify for the eliminator. In a rain-marred game, restricted to 15-overs-a-side, they were set a target of 124 by Islamabad and they had to score at least 111 runs to qualify for the eliminator. Gayle set the tempo through his blitzing knock of 44 off a mere 17 balls. The game was superbly finished by none other than Pollard himself on the second last ball of the match via a boundary. Gayle's knock and Pollard's finishing helped Karachi win this encounter against Islamabad.

Consequently, Karachi again faced Islamabad in the eliminator. In what proved to be a thrilling game, Karachi, batting first, scored a measly 126 getting all out in the process. Islamabad was set to win and qualify for the second play off. However, that was not the case as the second innings proved. The Karachi bowlers outshone the Islamabad bowlers with Mohammad Amir, Imad Wasim and Usama Mir each picking up three wickets. Islamabad were all out for a mere 82 runs, their lowest in the tournament and the second-lowest in the tournament's history. Hence, the defending champions were knocked out and Karachi lived another day in the tournament and qualified for the second play-off.

=== 2018 season ===
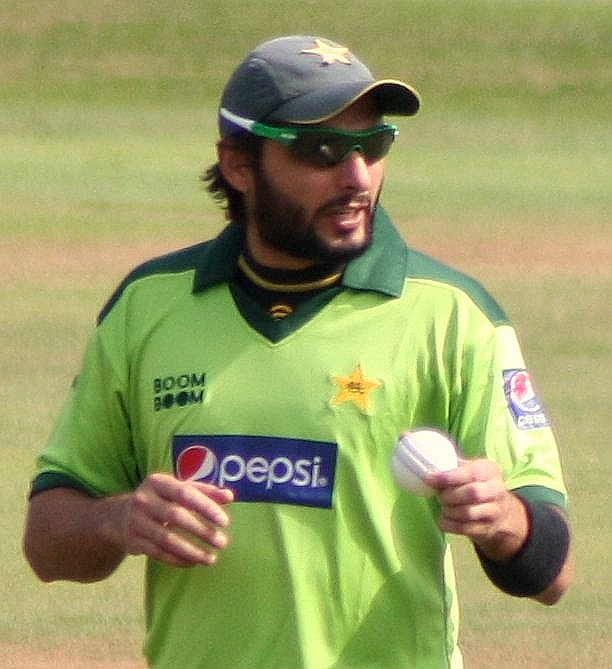
Shahid Afridi joined the team as president and player for 2018.

On 7 April 2017, Shahid Afridi joined the team as president, after leaving Peshawar Zalmi. Mitchell Johnson was replaced by Tymal Mills in the replacement draft on 29 January 2018, ahead of the 2018 season. In their opening match of the 2018 season, Kings ended the two-season losing streak against Quetta Gladiators by beating them by 19 runs. In their next game, the Kings continued their winning form by beating the defending champions, Peshawar Zalmi, in a closely fought game. Chasing a target of 132 runs, the team won with 2 balls and 5 wickets to spare. Their next game was against arch-rivals, Lahore Qalandars. Batting first, the Kings posted 159 for 9 on the board thanks to Bopara's unbeaten innings of 50 runs. In reply, the Qalandars got off to a great start, and were 68 for 1 inside 6 overs, but 3 quick wickets from man of the match, Shahid Afridi, ensured a third consecutive win for his team as the Qalandars fell short by 27 runs. The Kings were eliminated in Eliminator 2, played at Lahore on 21 March 2018 against Peshawar Zalmi.

As the league progressed to Sharjah, the Kings' game against Multan Sultans was washed out due to persistent rain. In the next game, against Islamabad United, the team's unbeaten run in the season was ended. Batting first, the Kings posted the highest total in Sharjah that year – 154 runs – before failing to defend it and losing the match by 8 wickets.

=== 2019 season ===
Before the 2019 season, Wasim Akram joined the franchise as president.

=== 2020 season ===
In PSL V, Karachi Kings reached the finals for the first time in PSL history after defeating the Multan Sultans in the qualifier match that went into a Super Over. They also went on to win the PSL V under the leadership of Imad Wasim. Karachi Kings defeated the Lahore Qalandars by five wickets in the final to win their maiden PSL title.

=== 2021 season ===
In the 2021 season of PSL, Karachi Kings had an excellent kickstart with winning their first match of the season against Quetta Gladiators.

=== 2022 season ===
The 2022 season proved to be highly challenging for Karachi Kings as they encountered significant setbacks. The team faced defeat in nine out of the ten matches played, ultimately concluding the season at the bottom of the points table.

=== 2025 season ===
Kings were captained by David Warner in 2025. They finished third in the league stage and lost to Lahore Qalandars by six wickets in the Eliminator on 22 May 2025.

== Team identity ==
The team name and logo were revealed on 21 December 2015. The logo features a lion with Karachi Kings written below in white and gold colors. At the ceremony, team owner Salman Iqbal said that the logo and the theme of the team represented the true spirit and resilience of Karachi. The team's primary jersey color is blue and gold. The jersey also incorporates the roaring lion logo in the bottom left of the shirt. AJ Sports (a sports manufacturing company) is the team's kit manufacturer.

Bahria Town, the largest real-estate developers and investors in Pakistan and the largest private housing society in Asia were the team's title sponsors for first three seasons. Besides Bahria Town other sponsors were Summit Bank, The Arkadians, Oye Hoye, Pepsi, Brighto Paints and Shield Corporation Ltd. Their official main principal partner for the 2017 season was Naya Nazimabad. Bridge Power was platinum sponsor. Cotton & Cotton signed an agreement to be their official apparel partner in December 2016. Vital Tea was their tea partner, their print media partner was the Pakistan Observer and Titans were their memorabilia partner.

Year	Kit manufacturer	Shirt sponsor (front)	Shirt sponsor (back)	Chest branding	Sleeve branding
2016	AJ Sports	Bahria Town	Summit Bank	The Arkadians	Oye Hoye Chips, K-Electric, Shield, Igloo Ice-cream
2017	AJ Sports	Bahria Town	Bridge Power Batteries	The Arkadians	Oye Hoye Chips, Shield, Tapal Tea
2018	AJ Sports	Bahria Town	Nurture	The Arkadians	Brighto Paints, Imtiaz, Shield
2019	AJ Sports	TUC	Scene on!	Cadbury Dairy Milk	Imtiaz, Inverex, Rooh Afza
2020	AJ Sports	ARY Laguna	QMobile	Surf Excel	Imtiaz, Mughal Steel, ARY Laguna
2021	AJ Sports	ARY Laguna	Hashmi Ispaghol	Pepsi	Imtiaz, Mughal Steel, ME Body Spray
2022	AJ Sports	PSO Carient Motor Oil	BankIslami	Pepsi	Imtiaz, Mughal Steel, Bona Papa
2023	AJ Sports	1XBAT	BankIslami	Pepsi	Imtiaz, Mughal Steel, ARY Laguna
2024	AJ Sports	ARY Laguna	Imtiaz	VGO Tel	Mughal Steel, Eazicolor, Dawlance
2025	AJ Sports	ARY Laguna	Imtiaz	Dawlance	Surf Excel
2026	AJ Sports	ARY Laguna	Imtiaz	Markhor Energy Drink	Jazz, Sheikhoo Steel

=== Anthems ===
Karachi Kings' anthem for the inaugural season was sung by Ali Azmat, titled "Dilon Ke Badshah". The anthem of the team for 2017 season titled "Dhan Dhana Dhan Hoga Re" was sung by Shehzad Roy. As for 2018 season, "De Dhana Dhan" was the team's official anthem sung again by Shehzad Roy.A slightly modified version of "De Dhana Dhan" was released by Shehzad Roy as the official anthem for the year 2019 and for 2020 Asim Azhar sang "Yeh Hai Karachi" which remained the title for the future anthems that came out in 2022 and 2023 which were also sung by Asim Azhar. 2022 anthem featured Talha Yunus and for 2023, Ali Azmat and Raamis Ali joined with Asim Azhar to release the anthem.

=== Ambassadors ===
Pakistani film stars Fahad Mustafa, Humayun Saeed and singer Shehzad Roy are the team's star ambassadors.

=== Rivalry ===
Karachi Kings have an active rivalry with Lahore Qalandars, which is considered to be the biggest rivalry in the PSL due to the historic economic and cultural rivalry between the cities of the two teams. As of the 2022* season, both teams have played 14 times, with the Kings coming out victorious 8 times. Karachi and Lahore were the two most expensive franchises when the PSL began.

== Current squad ==
Key
- Players with international caps are listed in **bold**.
- * denotes a player who is fully unavailable
- * denotes a player who will be partially unavailable

No.	Name	Nationality	Birth date	Salary	Batting style	Bowling style	Year signed	Notes
Batters
31	**David Warner**	Australia	27 October 1986 (age 40)	PKR 7.90 crore	Left-handed	Right-arm leg break	2025	Captain
47	**Aqib Ilyas**	Oman	5 September 1992 (age 34)	PKR 60 lakh	Right-handed	Right-arm off spin	2026	
10	**Muhammad Waseem**	United Arab Emirates	12 February 1996 (age 30)	PKR 1.10 crore	Right-handed	Right-arm medium	2026	
77	**Reeza Hendricks**	South Africa	14 August 1989 (age 37)	PKR	Right-handed	Right-arm off break	2026	
20	**Jason Roy**	England	21 July 1990 (age 36)	PKR	Right-handed	Right-arm medium	2026	
555	Haroon Arshad	Pakistan	31 October 2005 (age 21)	PKR 60 lakh	Right-handed	—	2026	
Wicket-keepers
24	Saad Baig	Pakistan	1 November 2006 (age 20)	PKR 60 lakh	Left-handed	—	2025	
23	**Azam Khan**	Pakistan	10 August 1998 (age 28)	PKR 3.25 crore	Right-handed	—	2026	
All-rounders
18	**Moeen Ali**	England	18 June 1987 (age 39)	PKR 6.44 crore	Left-handed	Right-arm off break	2026	
72	**Khushdil Shah**	Pakistan	7 February 1995 (age 31)	PKR 3.36 crore	Left-handed	Slow left-arm orthodox	2025	
67	**Salman Ali Agha**	Pakistan	23 October 1993 (age 33)	PKR 5.85 crore	Right-handed	Right-arm Off spin	2026	
17	Shahid Aziz	Pakistan	23 March 2003 (age 23)	PKR 92.5 lakh	Right-handed	Right-arm fast-medium	2026	
Bowlers
32	**Hasan Ali**	Pakistan	7 February 1994 (age 32)	PKR 4.76 crore	Right-handed	Right-arm fast-medium	2025	
55	**Abbas Afridi**	Pakistan	5 April 2001 (age 25)	PKR 3.08 crore	Right-handed	Right-arm fast-medium	2025	
92	**Mir Hamza**	Pakistan	10 September 1992 (age 34)	PKR 2.40 crore	Left-handed	Left-arm medium	2026	
88	**Adam Zampa**	Australia	31 March 1992 (age 34)	PKR 4.50 crore	Right-handed	Right-arm leg break	2026	
7	Mohammad Hamza Sohail	Pakistan	30 October 2000 (age 26)	PKR 60 lakh	Right-handed	Right-arm fast-medium	2026	
19	Khuzaima Tanveer	United Arab Emirates	20 December 1999 (age 26)	PKR 60 lakh	Right-handed	Right-arm fast	2026	
50	**Ihsanullah**	Pakistan	11 October 2002 (age 24)	PKR 1.05 crore	Right-handed	Right-arm fast	2026	
97	Rizwanullah	Pakistan	10 November 2008 (age 18)	PKR 60 lakh	Right-handed	Right-arm fast-medium	2026	

- Source: ESPNcricinfo

== Management and coaching staff ==
Position	Name
Head coach	(England) Ravi Bopara
Team Director	(Pakistan) Haider Azhar
High Performance & Assistant coach	(Pakistan) Muhammad Masroor
Fast bowling coach	(Australia) Shaun Tait
Strength and Conditioning coach	(Pakistan) Ibrahim Qureshi
Massage Therapist	(Pakistan) Muhammad Irfan
Head of Operations	(Pakistan) Syed Kamran Ghani

- Source: Official website

== Captains ==
As of 11 March 2024

Name	From	To	Mat	Won	Lost	Tie&W	Tie&L	NR	%
Shoaib Malik	2016	2016	8	2	6	0	0	0	25.00
Ravi Bopara	2016	2016	1	0	1	0	0	0	0.00
Kumar Sangakkara	2017	2017	10	5	5	0	0	0	50.00
Imad Wasim	2018	2023	51	23	24	1	1	2	48.97
Eoin Morgan	2018	2018	3	1	2	0	0	0	33.33
Mohammad Amir	2018	2018	1	0	1	0	0	0	0.00
Babar Azam	2020	2022	11	1	10	0	0	0	9.09
Shan Masood	2024	2025	10	4	6	0	0	0	40.00
David Warner	2025	Present	18	11	7	0	0	0	61.11
Moeen Ali	2026	2026	3	0	3	0	0	0	0.00

- Source: ESPNcricinfo

== Result summary ==
=== Overall result in PSL ===
Year	Pld	Won	Lost	Tie	NR	Position	Summary
2016	9	2	7	0	0	4/5	Play-offs
2017	10	5	5	0	0	3/5	Play-offs
2018	12	5	5	1	1	3/6	Play-offs
2019	11	5	6	0	0	4/6	Play-offs
2020	12	6	4	1	1	1/6	Champions
2021	11	5	6	0	0	4/6	Play-offs
2022	10	1	9	0	0	6/6	League Stage
2023	10	3	7	0	0	5/6	League Stage
2024	10	4	6	0	0	5/6	League Stage
2025	11	6	5	0	0	3/6	Play-offs
Total	106	42	60	2	2	1 Title	

=== Performance Visuals ===
League Position by Season
1st										
3rd										
5th										
6th										
	'16	'17	'18	'19	'20	'21	'22	'23	'24	'25

Win/Loss Ratio (2016–2025)
■ Wins	39.6%
■ Losses	56.6%
■ N/R & Ties	3.8%

=== Head-to-head record ===
Opposition	Span	Mat	Won	Lost	Tie+W	Tie+L	NR	SR (%)
Islamabad United	2016–2025	24	6	18	0	0	0	25.00
Lahore Qalandars	2016–2025	22	14	7	0	1	0	65.90
Multan Sultans	2018–2025	17	7	7	1	0	2	50.00
Peshawar Zalmi	2016–2025	23	8	15	0	0	0	34.78
Quetta Gladiators	2016–2025	20	7	13	0	0	0	35.00

KK Success vs Opponents (2025)
6:18	14:7	8:7	8:15	7:13
IU	LQ	MS	PZ	QG

Key: ■ KK Won | ■ IU | ■ LQ | ■ MS | ■ PZ | ■ QG
Source: ESPNcricinfo, Last updated: 23 February 2026

== Statistics ==
As of 7 April 2026

Babar Azam is the leading run scorer with 2,398 runs and Mohammad Amir is the leading wicket taker with 63 wickets.

=== Most runs ===
Player	Years	Innings	Runs	High score
Babar Azam	2017–2022	64	2,398	90*
Imad Wasim	2016–2023	63	1,086	92*
JM Vince	2016–2025	32	877	101
Sharjeel Khan	2020–2023	36	827	105
Shoaib Malik	2016–2024	38	813	71*

Most Runs (KK 2026)
2398	1086	877	827	813
Babar	Imad	Vince	Sharjeel	Malik

- Source: ESPNcricinfo

=== Most wickets ===
Player	Years	Innings	Wickets	Best bowling
Mohammad Amir	2016–2023	65	63	4/25
Imad Wasim	2016–2023	74	51	3/16
Hasan Ali	2024–2026	28	46	4/15
Usman Shinwari	2017–2022	29	37	4/15
Mir Hamza	2016–2026	27	32	4/27

Most Wickets (KK 2026)
63	51	46	37	32
Amir	Imad	Hasan	Usman	Hamza

- Source: ESPNcricinfo

== See also ==
- Karachi Kings–Lahore Qalandars rivalry
- Karachi Dolphins
- Karachi Zebras
