= Hum FM =

Programming
- Languages: Hindi, English
- Format: Music, Infotainment

Ownership
- Owner: Zee Entertainment Enterprises

History
- First air date: 1998

Links
- Website: http://www.humfm.com/

Hum FM is a private FM radio station, broadcasting separately from the United Arab Emirates which plays Bollywood and pop music. It was acquired by Zee Entertainment, a subsidiary of Essel Group in September 2016.

== Cricket commentary ==
In the past, Hum FM has broadcast the 2007 Cricket World Cup, Pakistan's tours of the West Indies, India and Sri Lanka in 2006, ICC Champions Trophy and many other major cricketing events live and exclusive for Pakistani and UAE listeners.
