= Imtiaz (retail chain) =

Pakistani supermarket chain

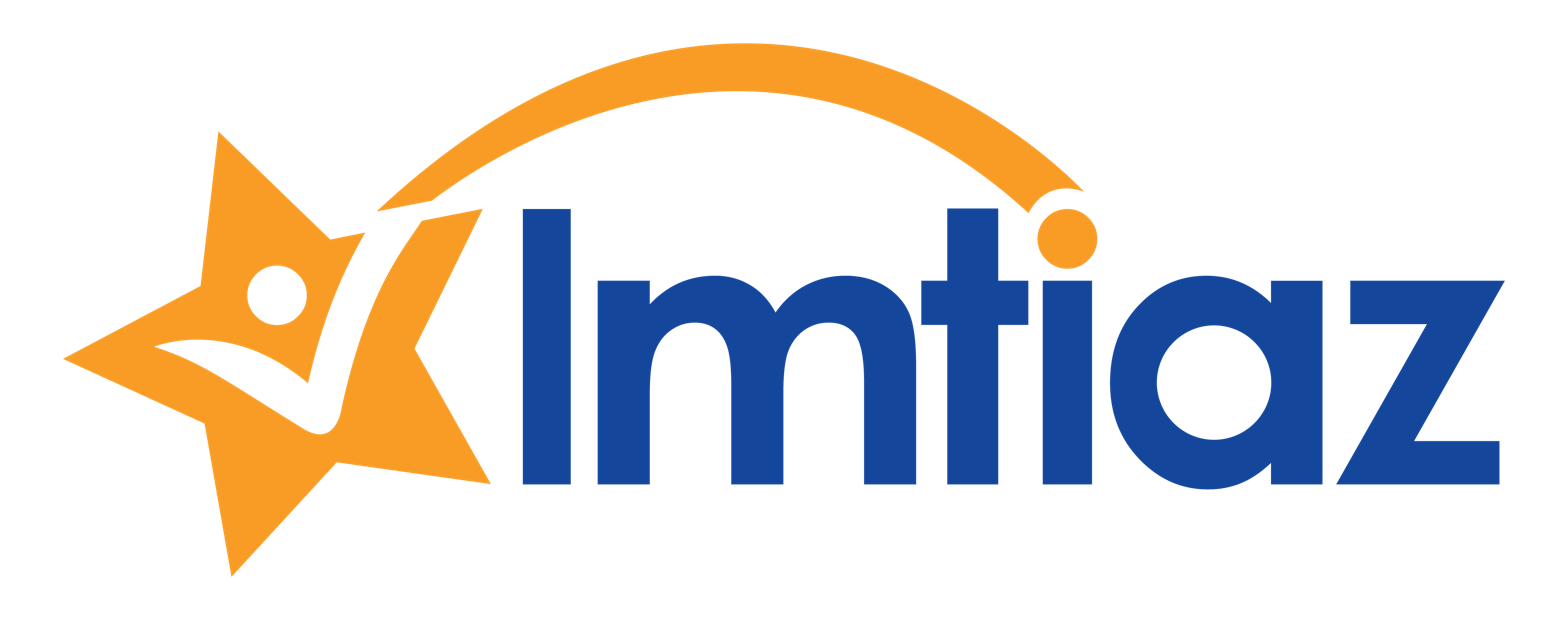

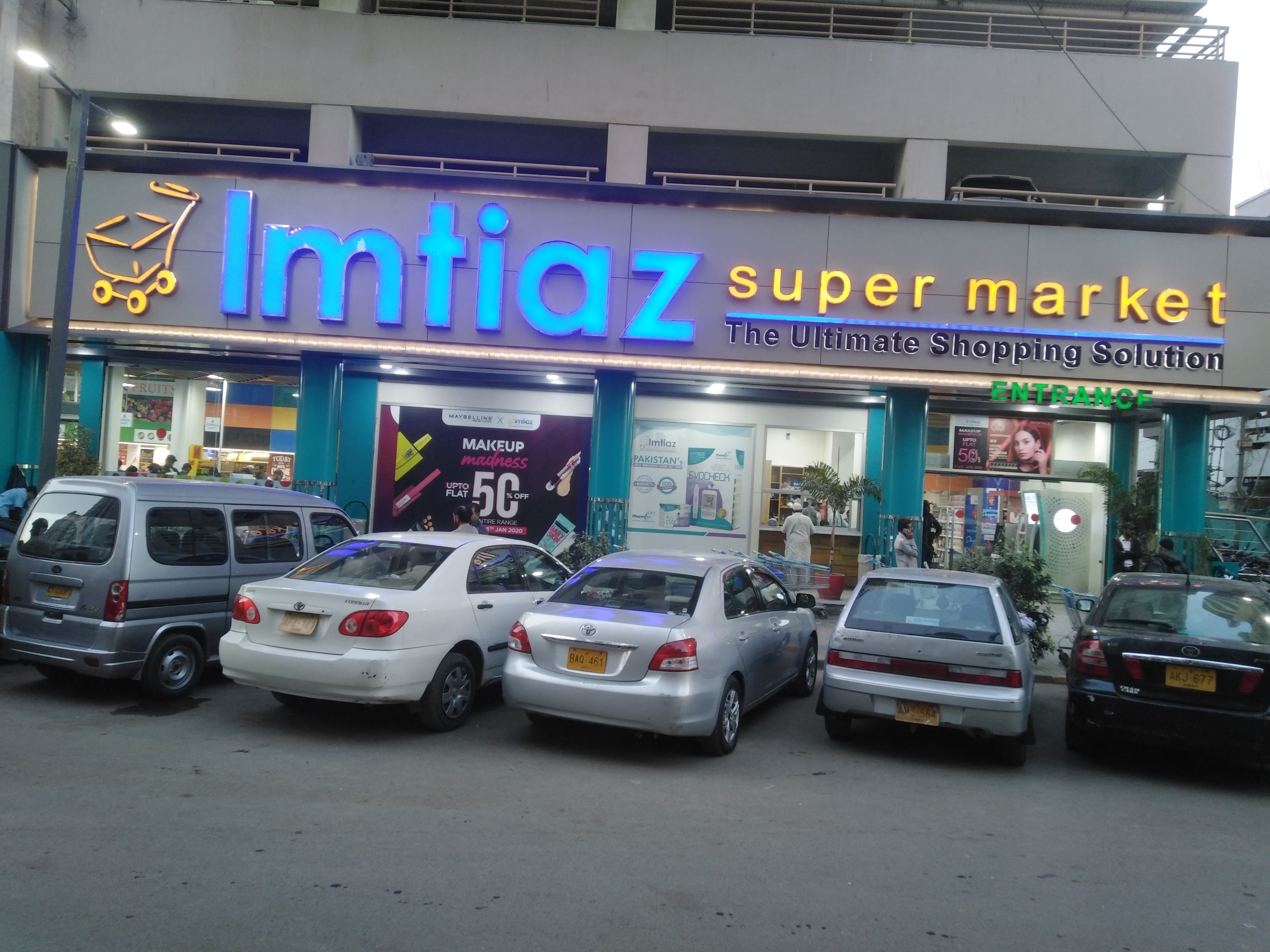
- Type: Private Limited
- Industry: Retail
- Founded: 1955; 71 years ago Karachi
- Founder: Imtiaz Abbasi
- Headquarters: Karachi, Sindh, Pakistan
- Number of locations: 36+
- Area served: Pakistan
- Products: Electronics; movies and music; home and furniture; home improvement; clothing; footwear; jewelry; toys; health and beauty; pet supplies; sporting goods and fitness; auto; photo finishing; craft supplies; party supplies; grocery
- Number of employees: 14,000+ (2023)
- Website: imtiaz.com.pk

Imtiaz (Urdu pronunciation: [ɪm.t̪ɪˈjaːz] im-tee-AHZ) is a Pakistani discount retailer chain that operates a chain of supermarkets across the country. It is headquartered in Karachi.

Imtiaz is the chief competitor of Metro and Carrefour in Pakistan.

== History ==
Imtiaz Super Market was founded in 1955 by Imtiaz Abbasi as a small superstore in Bahadurabad, Karachi. It has grown to become a leading supermarket chain in Pakistan. The retailer expanded within Karachi from 2003, 2010, 2013, 2016, and 2018, branching out to various localities, including Awami Markaz, Nazimabad, Defence, Gulshan-e-Iqbal, Sharafabad, and Malir.

By 2016, it had also opened a hypermarket in Gulshan-e-Iqbal and ventured into Punjab with a supermarket in Gujranwala. This expansion continued with new branches in Faisalabad (2017), Clifton (2019), and further outlets in Lahore (2020), Sialkot, Bahawalpur (2021), Sargodha, Vehari, Peshawar (2022) and Quetta (2023).

== Stores ==
As of 2024, Imtiaz has branches in Karachi, Lahore, Islamabad, Peshawar, Quetta, Faisalabad, Gujranwala, Bahawalpur, Sialkot, Gujrat, Sargodha, Multan, Vehari, and Sahiwal.
