= Mughal Steel =

Pakistani steel company

- Company type: Public
- Traded as: PSX: MUGHAL; KSE 100 component
- Industry: Steel
- Founded: 1950; 76 years ago
- Headquarters: Lahore, Pakistan
- Area served: Pakistan
- Key people: Mirza Javed Iqbal (Chairman); Khurram Javaid (CEO)
- Revenue: ▲ Rs. 89.413 billion (US$320 million) (2025)
- Operating income: ▼ Rs. 7.080 billion (US$25 million) (2025)
- Net income: ▼ Rs. 965.518 million (US$3.5 million) (2025)
- Total assets: ▼ Rs. 67.962 billion (US$240 million) (2025)
- Total equity: ▲ Rs. 28.819 billion (US$100 million) (2025)
- Number of employees: 2,080 (2025)
- Website: mughalsteel.com
- Footnotes / references Financials as of 30 June 2025

Mughal Iron & Steel Industries, commonly known as Mughal Steel (Urdu: مغل اسٹیل), is a Pakistani steel company which manufactures steel products and is based in Lahore.

== History ==
Mughal Steel was formed in the early 1950 as Mughal Traders. The entity then imported Iron and steel products for local consumption. It was started in 1950 as Mughal Traders imported Iron and steel products.

In 2008, Mughal acquired the plant and machinery of Al-Bashir Steel Industries.

In 2010, Mughal was incorporated as Mughal Iron & Steel Industries Limited.

In 2015, Mughal was listed on the Karachi Stock Exchange, following an initial public offering at a strike price of PKR 34.
