= Zain Farooqi =

Movie producer

- Education: University of Houston
- Occupation: Movie producer
- Known for: Producing Na Band Na Baraati and Money Back Guarantee.
- Website: zashkoentertainment.com

Zain Farooqi is a US-based movie producer who produced Na Band Na Baraati and Money Back Guarantee.

== Career ==
Farooqi holds a degree in Accounting and Finance from The University of Houston, Texas. He began his career in entertainment way back in 2004. He later founded Zashko Entertainment (ZSK), through which he produces and distributes movies.
