= Pakistani Americans =

Americans of Pakistani birth or descent

پاکستانی امریکی pākistānī amrīkī
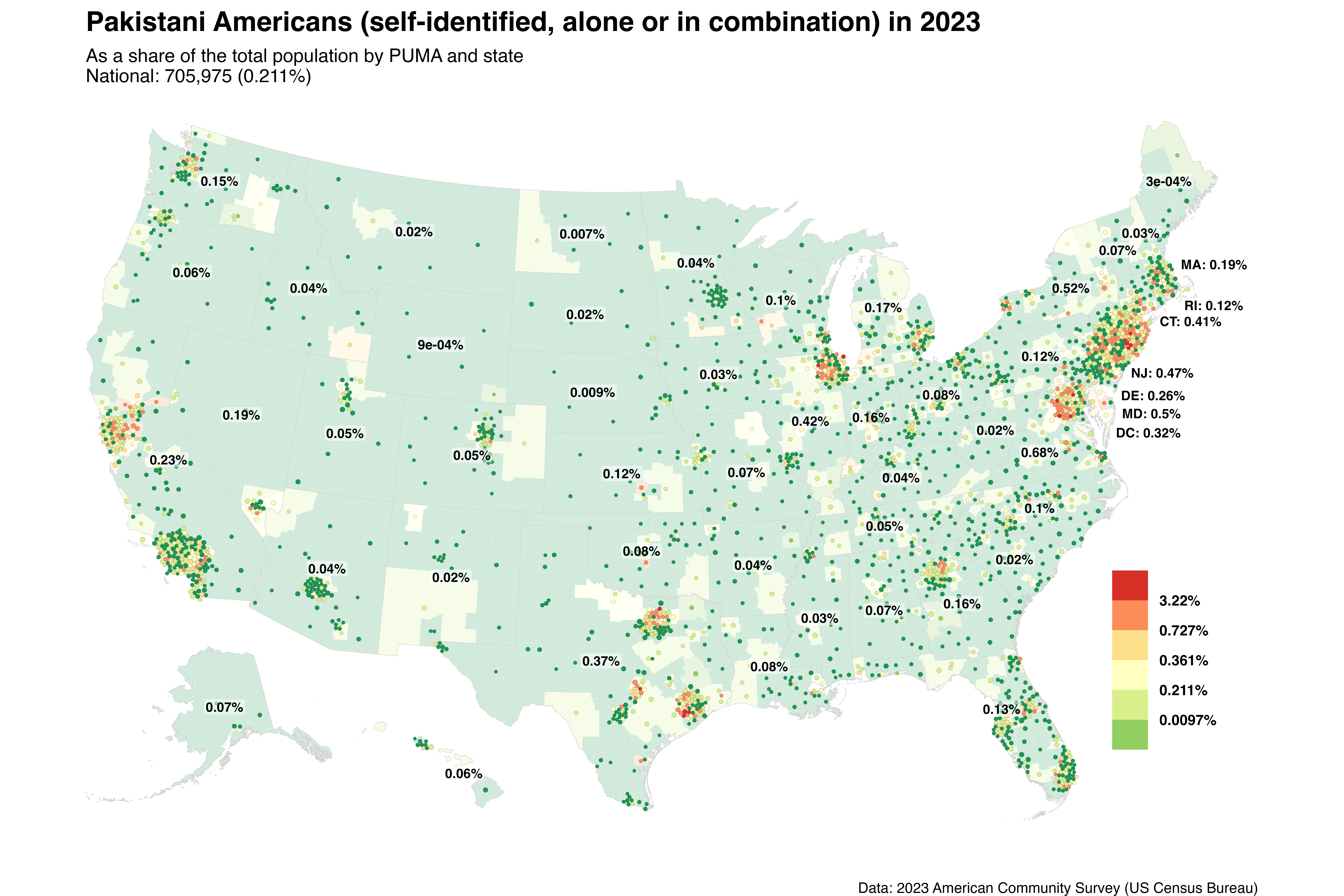
- American-Pakistanis by PUMA and state according to the U.S. Census Bureau's American Community Survey (2023)

Total population
- 706,253 (2023) (ancestry or ethnic origin); 428,795 (2023) (born in Pakistan)

Regions with significant populations
- New York City Metropolitan Area, New Jersey, Baltimore-Washington Metropolitan Area, Philadelphia metropolitan area, Chicago Metropolitan Area, Houston metropolitan area, Los Angeles Metropolitan Area, San Francisco Bay Area, Boston, Atlanta, Phoenix metropolitan area, Dallas-Fort Worth, Florida, and major metropolitan areas throughout the United States

Languages
- English; Urdu; Punjabi; Pashto; Balochi; Sindhi; Saraiki; Hindko; Pahari-Pothwari; Brahui; Shina and other languages of Pakistan

Religion
- Predominantly Islam (96%), mostly Sunni Islam (72%)

Pakistani Americans (Note: Urdu: پاکستانی امریکی, romanized: pākistānī amrīkī, pronounced [ˈpaːkɪstaːniː əmˈriːkiː]) are citizens of the United States who have full or partial ancestry from Pakistan, or more simply, Pakistanis in America. They can be from different ethnic groups in Pakistan like Punjabi, Saraiki, Sindhi, Balochi, Pashtun, Kashmiri or Muhajir/Urdu-speaking people. The term may also refer to people who also hold a dual Pakistani and U.S. citizenship. Educational attainment level and household income are much higher in the Pakistani-American diaspora compared to the U.S. population at large. In 2019, there were an estimated 554,202 self-identified Pakistani Americans, representing about 0.187% of the U.S. population, and about 2.50% of Asian Americans; more specifically, around 8% of South Asian Americans.

== History in the United States ==
Immigrants from modern-day Pakistan (formerly British India) had been immigrating to America as early as the nineteenth century, working in agriculture, logging, and mining in the western states of California, Oregon, and Washington. The passage of the Luce-Celler Act of 1946 allowed these immigrants to acquire U.S. citizenship through naturalization. Between 1947 and 1965, only 2,500 Pakistani immigrants entered the United States; most of them were students who chose to settle in the U.S. after graduating from American universities, according to reports from the U.S. Immigration and Naturalization Service. This marked the beginning of a distinct Pakistani community in America. However, after President Lyndon B. Johnson signed the INS Act of 1965 into law, eliminating per-country immigration quotas and introducing immigration on the basis of professional experience and education, the number of Pakistanis immigrating to the U.S. increased dramatically. As of the 1990 U.S. Census, the Pakistani-American population was 100,000. By 2005, that figured more than doubled to 210,000. In 2023, Monroe Township High School, in Monroe Township, Middlesex County, New Jersey, launched the first high school cricket team in New Jersey. In Texas, Zain Haq, launched the first ever official High School Cricket League in San Antonio with the formation of the San Antonio High School Cricket Association (SAHSCA).

=== Self-identity ===
In a study on the ethnic identification of South Asian Americans based on the 1990 U.S. Census, a sample of 299 Pakistanis living in the United States showed that, while 6.7% identified as white and 0.3% identified as black, a grand majority identified as Asian.

== Demographics ==
Historical population

Year	Pop.	±% p.a.
2000	204,309	—
2010	409,163	+7.19%
2011	390,861	−4.47%
2012	409,966	+4.89%
2013	480,585	+17.23%
2014	489,166	+1.79%
2015	518,769	+6.05%

Year	Pop.	±% p.a.
2016	500,433	−3.53%
2017	544,640	+8.83%
2018	526,956	−3.25%
2019	554,202	+5.17%
2021	629,946	+6.61%
2023	684,438	+4.24%

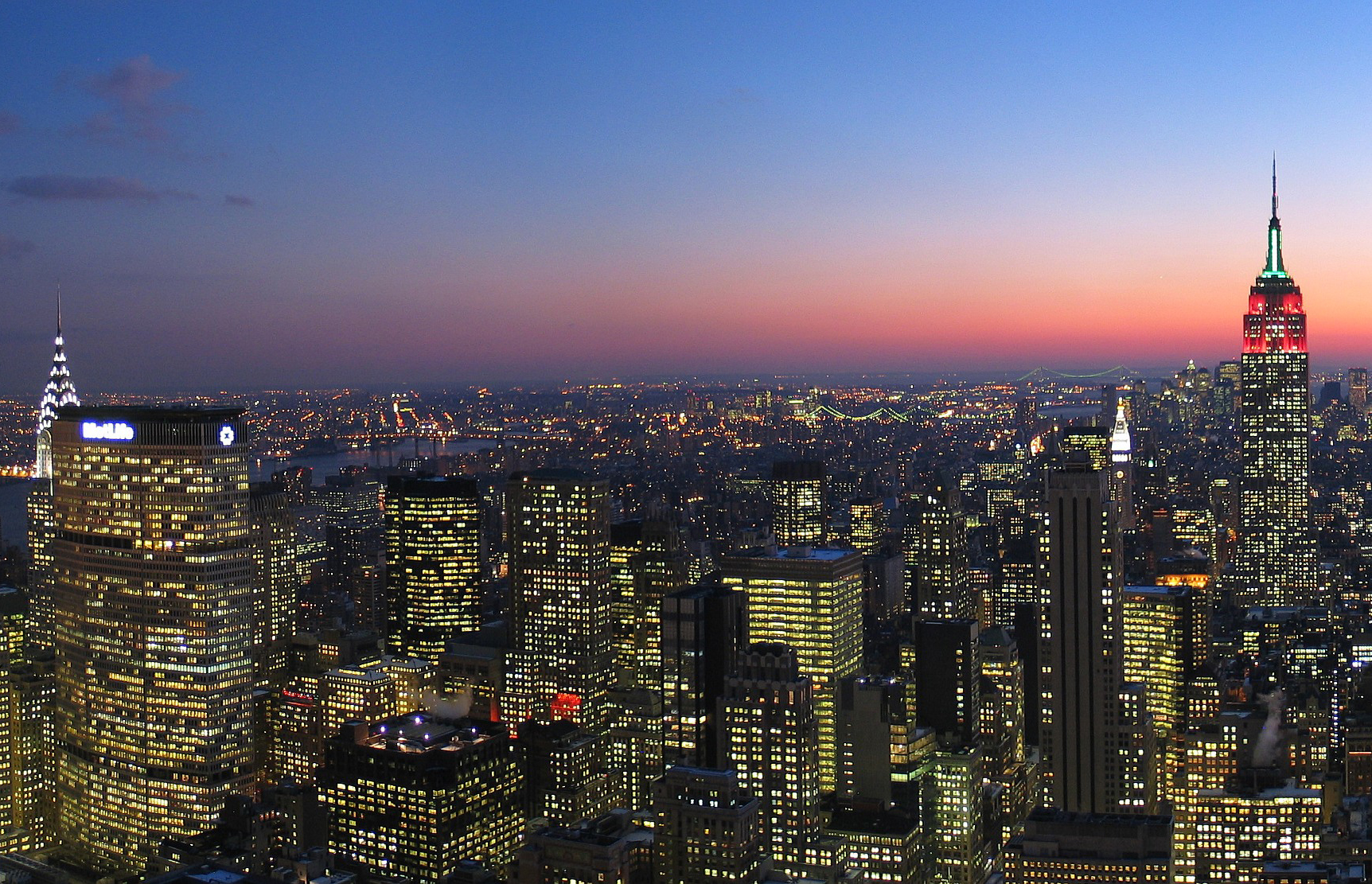
The New York City Metropolitan Area, including New York City, Central New Jersey, as well as Long Island in New York, is home to the largest Pakistani American population.

In 2021, the U.S. Census Bureau estimated that there were 629,946 U.S. residents of Pakistani descent, an increase from 409,163 at the 2010 Census. Some studies estimate the Pakistani population to be much higher, and in 2005, the Embassy of Pakistan in the U.S. found that the population exceeded 700,000. Pakistan is the 12th highest ranked country of origin for immigration to the U.S.

Perhaps 50% of Pakistani Americans speak Punjabi, 30% speak Urdu, and the remainder speak languages such as Sindhi, Saraiki, Hindko, Pashto, Baloch, Memoni, and Kashmiri. The most systematic study of the demography of Pakistanis in America lies within Dr. Adil Najam's book Portrait of a Giving Community, which estimates a population of 500,000.

=== Total population by state ===
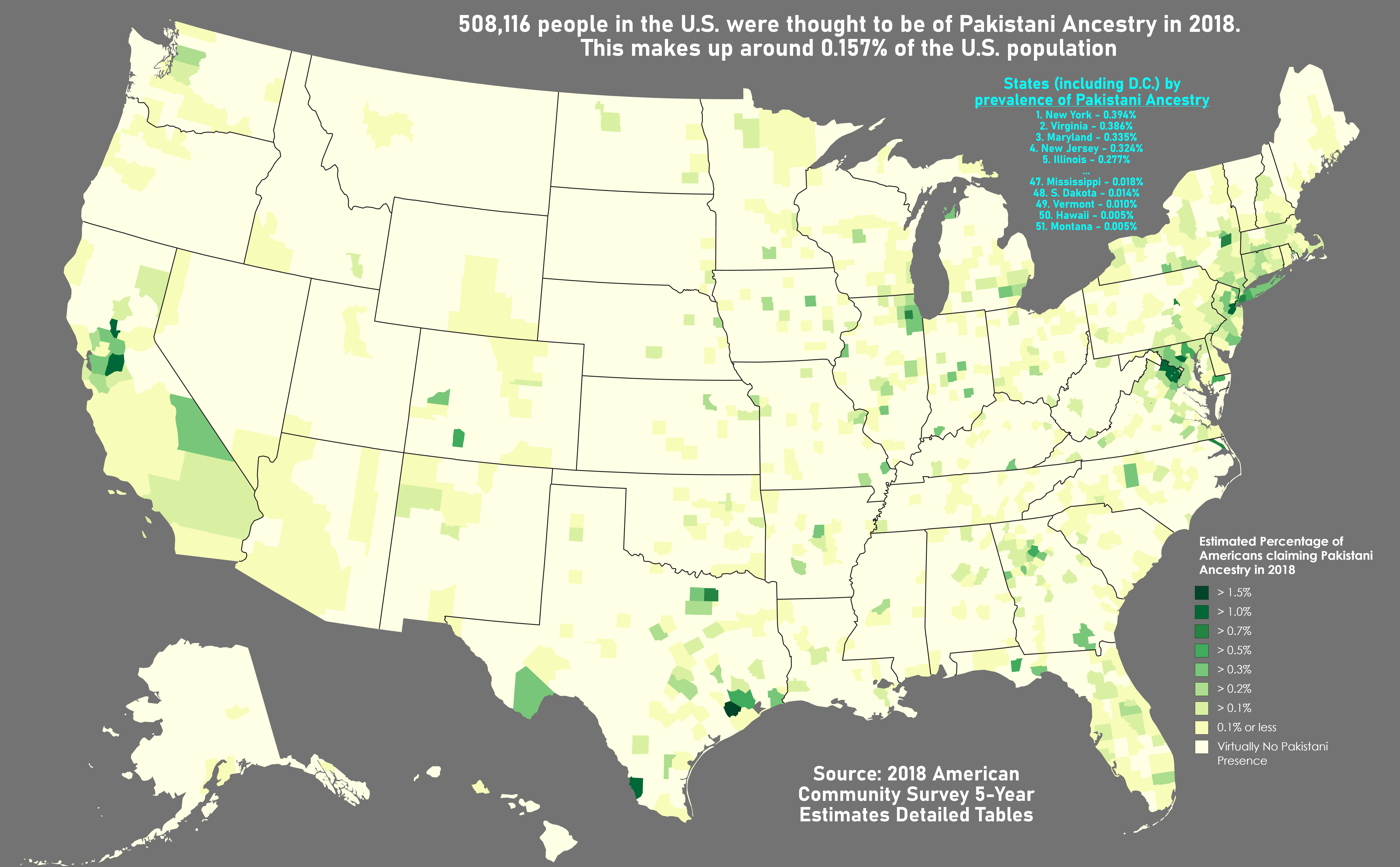
Distribution of Americans claiming Pakistani Ancestry by county in 2018

All 50 U.S. states and the District of Columbia are ranked below based on the estimated population of residents of Pakistani descent according to the 2018 American Community Survey:

1. New York – 77,352
2. Texas – 74,712
3. California – 63,038
4. Illinois – 35,496
5. Virginia – 32,474
6. New Jersey – 28,792
7. Maryland – 20,140
8. Florida – 17,783
9. Georgia – 14,436
10. Pennsylvania – 12,580
11. Michigan – 11,415
12. Massachusetts – 8,466
13. North Carolina – 6,721
14. Washington – 6,483
15. Connecticut – 6,454
16. Ohio – 5,131
17. Missouri – 4,776
18. Indiana – 4,049
19. Wisconsin – 3,134
20. Arizona – 2,786
21. Oklahoma – 2,588
22. Minnesota – 2,415
23. Tennessee – 2,338
24. Alabama – 2,055
25. Louisiana – 1,987
26. Colorado – 1,969
27. Kansas – 1,758
28. Nevada – 1,663
29. Arkansas – 1,623
30. Iowa – 1,393
31. Kentucky – 1,255
32. Oregon – 1,194
33. Delaware – 1,082
34. South Carolina – 966
35. District of Columbia – 801
36. Rhode Island – 775
37. Utah – 751
38. New Mexico – 704
39. New Hampshire – 679
40. West Virginia – 556
41. Mississippi – 547
42. Nebraska – 445
43. Idaho – 309
44. Maine – 266
45. North Dakota – 186
46. Wyoming – 156
47. Alaska – 136
48. South Dakota – 117
49. Hawaii – 75
50. Vermont – 63
51. Montana – 53

=== Share of population by state ===
Americans with Pakistani Ancestry by state according to the U.S. Census Bureau's American Community Survey (2015 – 2019)

All 50 U.S. states and the District of Columbia are ranked below based on the estimated percentage of residents of Pakistani descent according to the 2018 American Community Survey:

1. New York – 0.394%
2. Virginia – 0.386%
3. Maryland – 0.335%
4. New Jersey – 0.324%
5. Illinois – 0.277%
6. Texas – 0.268%
7. Connecticut – 0.180%
8. California – 0.161%
9. Georgia – 0.140%
10. Massachusetts – 0.124%
11. District of Columbia – 0.117%
12. Michigan – 0.115%
13. Delaware – 0.114%
14. Pennsylvania – 0.098%
15. Washington – 0.089%
16. Florida – 0.086%
17. Missouri – 0.078%
18. Rhode Island – 0.073%
19. North Carolina – 0.066%
20. Oklahoma – 0.066%
21. Indiana – 0.061%
22. Kansas – 0.060%
23. Nevada – 0.057%
24. Arkansas – 0.054%
25. Wisconsin – 0.054%
26. New Hampshire – 0.051%
27. Iowa – 0.044%
28. Ohio – 0.044%
29. Minnesota – 0.044%
30. Louisiana – 0.043%
31. Alabama – 0.042%
32. Arizona – 0.040%
33. Colorado – 0.036%
34. Tennessee – 0.035%
35. New Mexico – 0.034%
36. West Virginia – 0.030%
37. Oregon – 0.029%
38. Kentucky – 0.028%
39. Wyoming – 0.027%
40. North Dakota – 0.025%
41. Utah – 0.025%
42. Nebraska – 0.023%
43. Maine – 0.020%
44. South Carolina – 0.019%
45. Alaska – 0.018%
46. Idaho – 0.018%
47. Mississippi – 0.018%
48. South Dakota – 0.014%
49. Vermont – 0.010%
50. Hawaii – 0.005%
51. Montana – 0.005%

=== New York City Metropolitan Area ===
The Greater New York City Combined Statistical Area, consisting of New York City, Long Island, and adjacent areas of New York State, as well as nearby areas in New Jersey (extending to Trenton), Connecticut (extending to Bridgeport), and Pike County, Pennsylvania, comprises by far the largest Pakistani-American population of any metropolitan area in the United States, receiving the highest legal permanent resident Pakistani immigrant population. Within the greater metropolitan area, New York City itself hosts the largest concentration of Pakistani Americans of any U.S. city proper, with a population of approximately 34,310 as of the 2000 U.S. census, primarily in the boroughs of Queens and Brooklyn. These numbers made Pakistani Americans the fifth largest Asian American group in New York City. From 2000 to 2006, this figure had increased from 34,310 to 60,000. When including illegal immigrants in population figures, the population expands to roughly 70,000. Pakistan International Airlines served John F. Kennedy International Airport in Queens until 2017. While New York City has celebrated North America's largest Pakistan Day parade for decades, New Jersey's first annual Pakistan Day parade was held on August 16, 2015, in Edison and Woodbridge, New Jersey.

=== California ===
It has been estimated that 10,000 Pakistanis work in Silicon Valley, most of whom work in the information technology, software development, and computer science sectors. From 1990 to 2000, the San Francisco Bay Area's Pakistani population increased from 3,477 to 6,119, an increase of 76%.

Predating modern-day Pakistan, Muslims from the British Raj immigrated in waves starting in 1902 to the West Coast, most notably in Yuba City, California, in search for mining and logging jobs. Some of the oldest Muslim communities and largest Sikh communities in the U.S. remain in Yuba City to this day.

=== Chicago ===
Devon Avenue has a cross street named for Pakistan's founder Muhammad Ali Jinnah as well as Mahatma Gandhi to honor both the Indian and Pakistani businesses there.

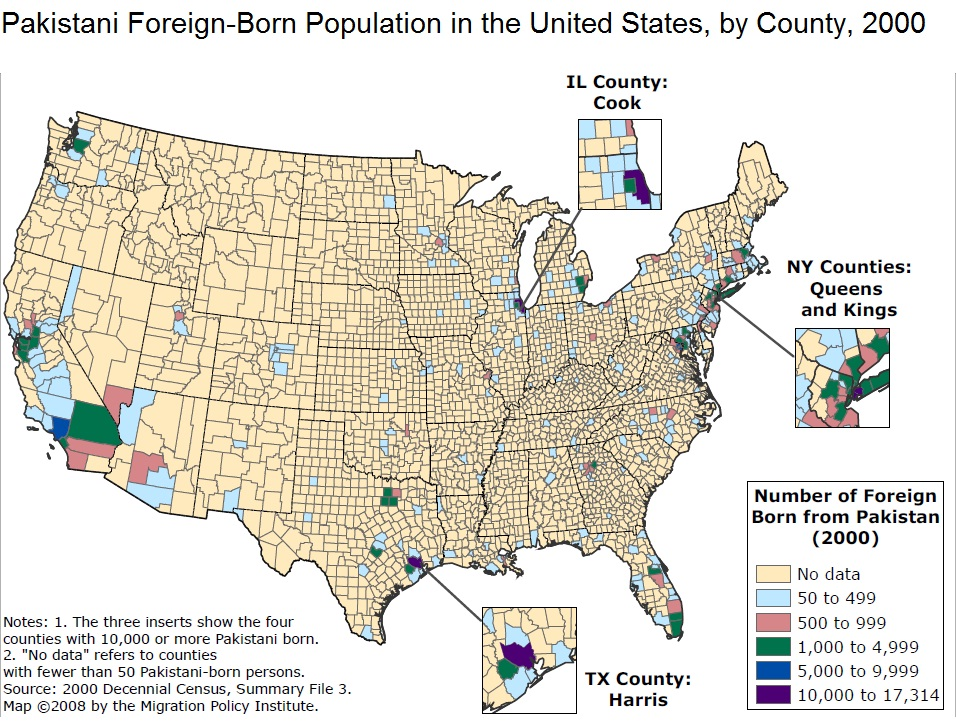
Pakistani-born population spread in the United States, 2000

=== Texas ===
Texas has a large Pakistani population, estimated at 70,000 people as of 2018. They are primarily concentrated in the Austin, Dallas-Fort Worth, Houston, and San Antonio metropolitan areas.

The community consists of professionals involved in medicine, IT, and engineering; textiles, manufacturing, real estate, and management; as well as those working in small businesses such as travel agencies, motels, restaurants, convenience stores and gas stations. Houston is also home to one of the busiest Pakistani restaurants in the world, Aga's.

=== Other cities ===
Newly arrived Pakistani immigrants mostly settle in cities such as New York City; Paterson, New Jersey; Los Angeles; Atlanta; Boston; San Diego; San Francisco; Chicago; Denver; and Detroit. As with other South Asians, Pakistanis generally settle in major urban areas. Pakistani Americans are also prevalent in Arizona, Arkansas, Colorado, Connecticut, Georgia, Louisiana, Massachusetts, Michigan, Nevada, New England, New Mexico, Ohio, Oklahoma, Oregon, Seattle, Virginia, the District of Columbia, Wisconsin and Utah. Fremont, California, has the largest Pashtun population in the U.S., many of which emigrated from Pakistan.

U.S. localities with the highest percentages of Pakistani ancestry include Madison Park, New Jersey (5.7%); Herricks, New York (4.1%); Boonton, New Jersey (4%); Lincolnia, Virginia (3%); Stafford, Texas (2%); and Avenel, New Jersey (2%).

== Culture ==
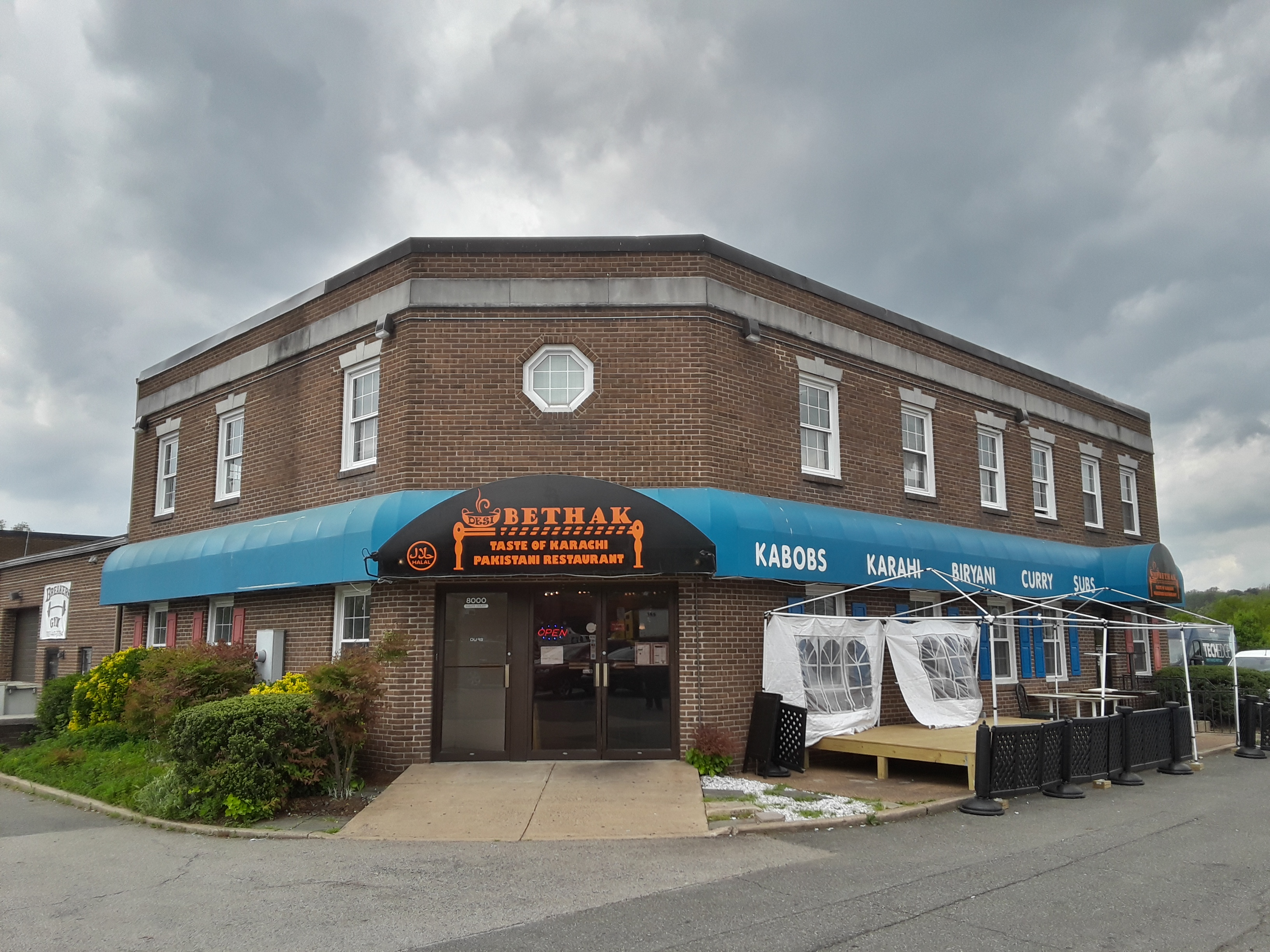
Pakistani restaurant in Newington, Virginia

As with the terms "Asian American" or "South Asian American," the term "Pakistani American" is an umbrella term applying to a variety of views, values, lifestyles, and appearances. Although Pakistani Americans retain a strong ethnic identity, they are known to assimilate into American culture while at the same time keeping the culture of their ancestors. Pakistani Americans are known to assimilate more easily than many other immigrant groups because they have fewer language barriers (English is a co-official language of Pakistan and widely spoken in the country among professional classes), higher educational credentials (immigrants are disproportionately well-educated among Pakistanis), and come from a similarly diverse, relatively tolerant, and multi-ethnic society. In addition to national identity, many Pakistani Americans also identify with their ethnic group (i.e. Punjabi, Pashtun, Sindhi, Muhajir, Baloch etc.)

Pakistani Americans are well represented in the fields of medicine, engineering, finance and information technology. Pakistani Americans have brought Pakistani cuisine to the United States, and Pakistani cuisine has been established as one of the most popular cuisines in the country with hundreds of Pakistani restaurants in each major city and several similar eateries in smaller cities and towns. There are many Pakistani markets and stores in the United States. Many of such establishments cater to a broader South Asian audience due to similarities in cuisine. Some of the largest Pakistani markets are in New York City, Central New Jersey, Washington, D.C., Chicago, Dallas and Houston.

=== Languages ===
Pakistani Americans often retain their native languages, such as Punjabi, Saraiki, Sindhi, Balochi, Pashto and Kashmiri. As English is an official language in Pakistan and is taught in schools throughout the country, many immigrants coming to the United States generally have an ability to speak the English language.

Many Pakistanis in the United States also speak Pakistan's national language Urdu, although it is not native to the country.

=== Religion ===
Most Pakistani Americans are Muslims. Religion figures prominently in many Pakistani American families.

The majority of Pakistanis are Sunni Muslims, although a significant minority are Shi'ite or Ahmadiyya Muslims. In smaller American towns which do not have mosques within an hour's driving distance, Pakistani Americans make trips to attend the nearest one mainly on major religious holidays and occasions,such as Eid. Pakistani Americans worship at mosques alongside other Muslims who often trace their ancestry to other parts of the Islamic world; mosques in the U.S. are usually not specific to a particular nationality or ethnic group.

Pakistani Americans also participate in and contribute to the larger Islamic community, which includes Americans of Arab, African, Indian, Bangladeshi, Iranian, Turkish, Azerbaijani, Indonesian, Malaysian, Albanian, and Bosnian descent. Pakistanis are part of the larger Muslim community's efforts to educate the country about Islam's principles and teachings. Pakistani Americans have played important roles in the Muslim Students Association (MSA), which caters to the needs of Islamic students across the U.S. Pakistani Americans have also significantly contributed to the Islamic Society of North America and Islamic Circle of North America, which are both considered offshoots of the MSA.

Although most Pakistani Americans are Muslims, some are Hindus, Christians, or Zoroastrians. Pakistani Christians, like Asian Christians, worship at churches all over the country and share in the religious life of the dominant Christian culture in America. Pakistani Hindus mainly originate from Karachi and religiously associate with fellow Hindus from India. In recent times, Pakistani Zoroastrians (called Parsis) mainly emigrated from Lahore and Karachi to the U.S. Pakistani Zoroastrians religiously associate with fellow Zoroastrians from Iran.

== Notable contributions ==
Pakistani Americans have made many contributions to the U.S. in science, politics, the military, sports, philanthropy, and business.

=== Business and finance ===
Shahid Khan is a Pakistani-American billionaire businessman who is owner of an auto-parts company and the NFL team the Jacksonville Jaguars. As of 2012, his net worth was estimated to exceed $6 billion, being ranked at No. 179 on the Forbes 400 list of wealthiest Americans. Forbes also ranked him the 491st wealthiest person in the world.

=== Education ===
Amir Hussain is a scholar of Islam and President of the American Academy of Religion. Scholars, such as Omar Suleiman and Nouman Ali Khan, preach Islam in the country.

=== Philanthropy ===
In 2002, the community contributed nearly $1 billion in philanthropic activities (including value of volunteered time.) Since the Pakistani diaspora has spread internationally over the years, many Pakistanis living abroad choose to donate time, money, and talent to further development in Pakistan. Pakathon, for example, aims to empower Pakistanis through innovation, technology, and entrepreneurship.

=== Military ===
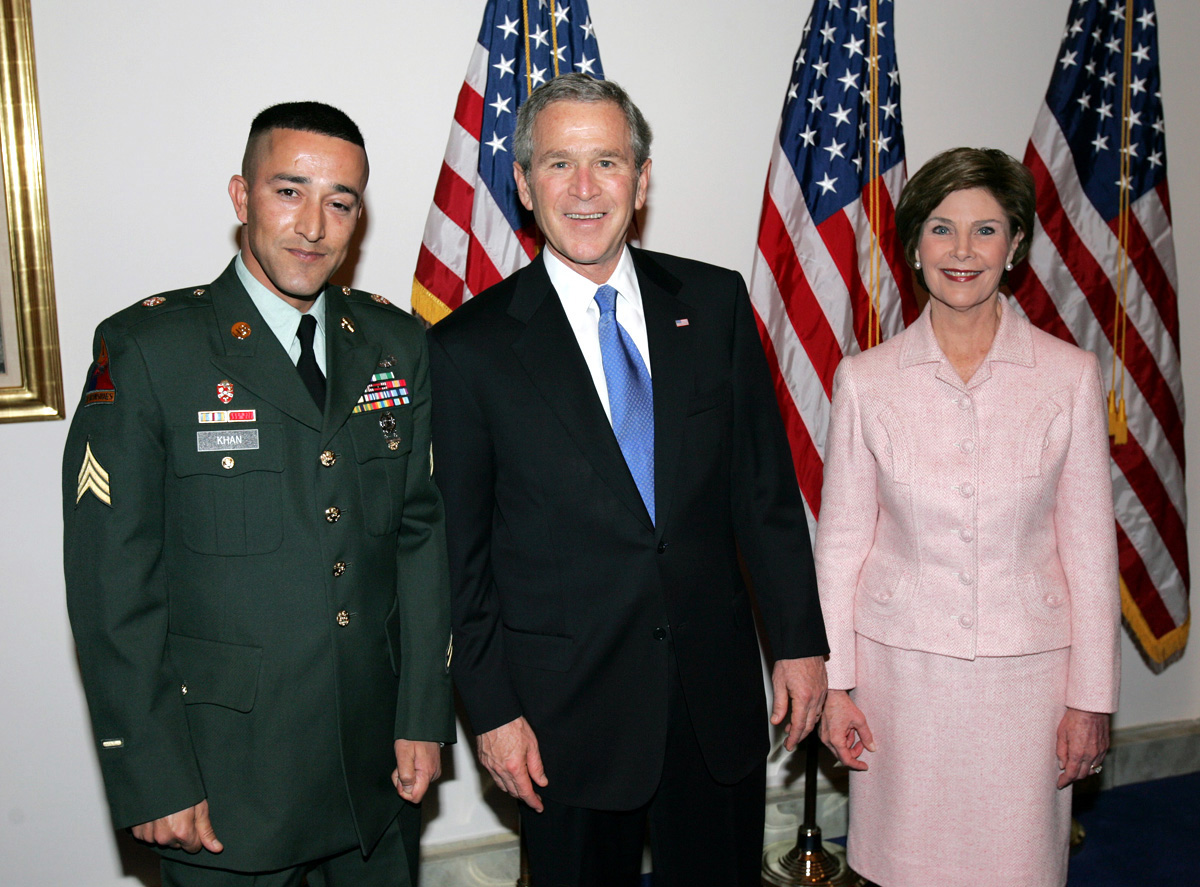
Then President George W. Bush and Laura Bush with Pakistani-American U.S. Army Sgt. Wasim Khan at the 2004 State of the Union Address, U.S. Capitol building, February 1, 2004.

Pakistani-American soldiers compose a sizable proportion of the over 4,000 Muslim service members in the U.S. military. As of February 2008, 125 Pakistan-born service members were serving on active duty in the U.S. Armed Forces, out of the 826 U.S., service members born in South Central Asia. This figure does not include U.S.-born service members of Pakistani ancestry.

Pakistani-American service members have assisted in U.S. intelligence operations, and have worked as interpreters, interrogators, and liaison officers in Afghanistan. Their knowledge of local languages such as Pashto and Dari helps facilitate coordination activities.

The overall number of Afghan and Pakistani Americans involved in the war effort has not been released, although their recruitment by the CIA and U.S. Defense Department agencies has been very public. Because most of their work was secret, few of the men have received any public recognition.

— Los Angeles Times

- Cpt. Humayun Saqib Muazzam Khan was a Pakistani-American soldier who posthumously received a Bronze Star and Purple Heart. He was killed in Iraq and buried at Arlington National Cemetery. Khan's parents, Khizr and Ghazala Khan, appeared at the 2016 Democratic National Convention to challenge Donald Trump's views on Muslims.
- Another Pakistani American who received both a Bronze Star and Purple Heart was Kareem Rashad Sultan Khan who died in Iraq. Others have served in different capacities, such as working as military commissaries abroad.
- Naveed Jamali is an intelligence officer in the U.S. Navy Reserve.
- Atif Qarni is a former U.S. Marine who served for eight years, including in Iraq; he is a Democratic politician who was appointed as the 19th Virginia Secretary of Education.

=== Entertainment ===
- Shayan Khan is an actor and film producer.

=== Sports ===
- Gibran Hamdan, a quarterback, is the first player of Pakistani descent to play in the NFL.
- Mustafa Ali is the first wrestler of Pakistani descent to compete for the WWE.

== Socioeconomics ==
=== Occupation and income ===
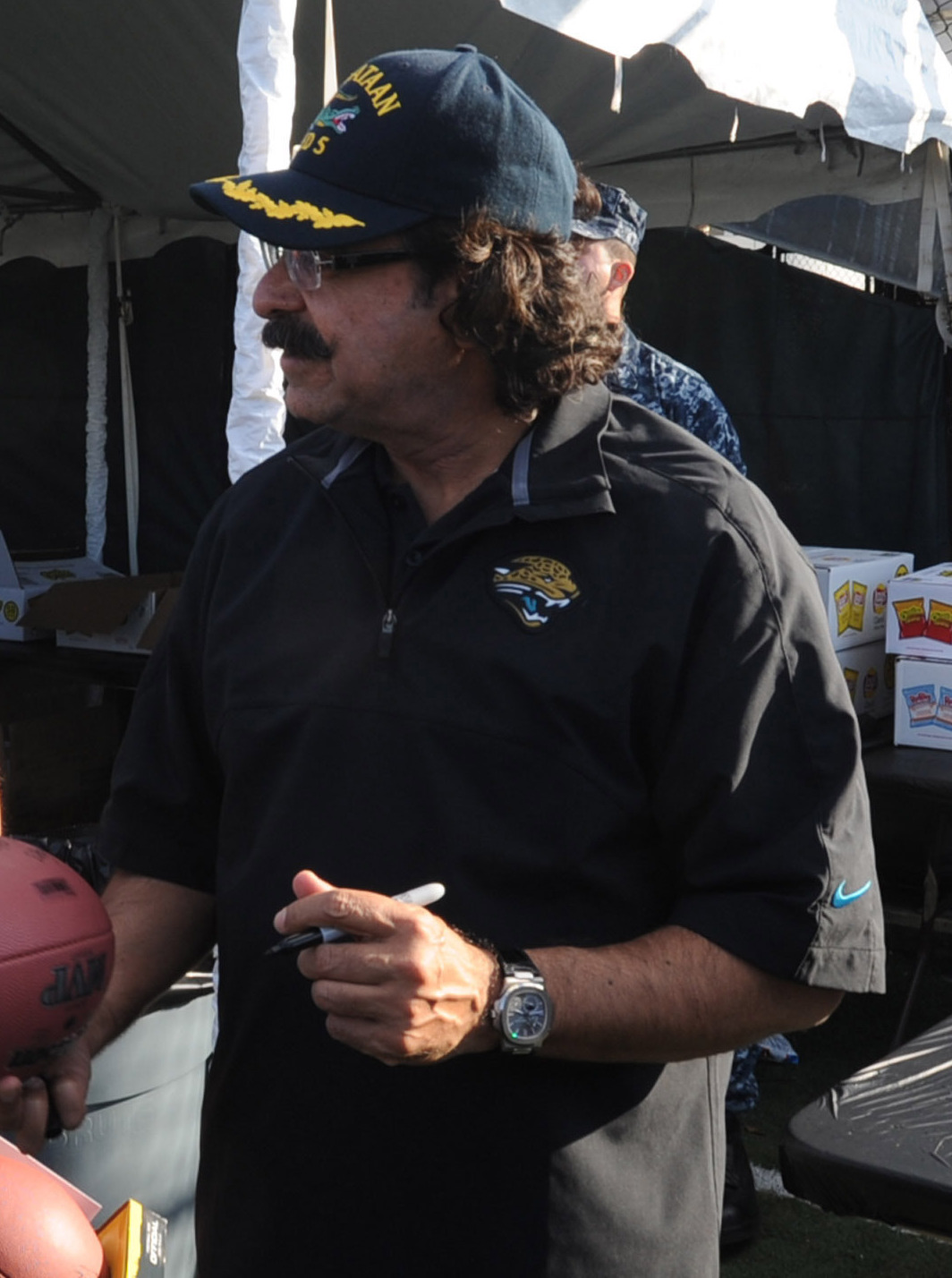
Shahid Khan, a Pakistani-American billionaire

The Pakistani American community generally lives in a comfortable middle-class, upper-middle-class and upper-class lifestyles. Many Pakistani Americans follow the residence pattern set by other immigrants to the United States that when they increase their wealth, they are able to own or franchise small businesses; including restaurants, groceries and convenience stores, clothing and appliance stores, petrol and gas stations, newspaper booths, and travel agencies. It is common to include members of the extended and immediate family in the business.

Members of the Pakistani community believe in the symbolic importance of owning homes; accordingly, Pakistani Americans tend to save money and make other monetary sacrifices earlier on in order to purchase their own homes as soon as possible. Members of the family and sometimes the closer community tend to take care of each other, and to assist in times of economic need. Hence, it would be more common to turn to a community member for economic assistance rather than to a government agency. This leads to relatively low use of welfare and public assistance by Pakistani-Americans. According to the 2000 Census, the mean household income in the United States in 2002 was $57,852 annually, whereas for Asian households, which includes Pakistanis this was $70,047. A separate study conducted by the American Community Survey in 2005, showed the mean and median incomes for Pakistani male full-time workers were US$59,310 and US$42,718 - respectively compared to the average male American full-time workers' mean and median incomes of US$56,724 and US$41,965 - respectively. A 2011 report based on data from the 2010 US Census reported the median household income of Pakistani-American families at $63,000, which was considerably higher than the American family income average of $51,369.

There is also incidence of poverty in the Pakistani community and in particular around the growing number of new immigrants that migrated from less privileged backgrounds in Pakistan. These migrants tend to take low-paying jobs involving manual or unskilled labor and tend to live in large cities where such jobs are readily available and in particular New York, where as of the 2000 census, poverty rates for Pakistanis in relation to the total New York population were higher overall, with 28% of Pakistanis living in poverty, which is greater than the general New York City poverty rate of 21%. Compared with those immigrants that arrived from 1965 who were either professionals or students and considered to be middle- and upper-class, the newer migrants tended to be worse off economically.

=== Education ===
According to American Factfinder, Pakistani Americans are high achievers academically and tend to be better educated as compared to other heritage groups in the United States with 89.1% being at least high school graduates and about 54% holding a bachelor's degree or higher professional degree. Additionally it was found that over 30% of Pakistani Americans hold graduate or professional degrees.

==== Physicians ====
An increasing number of Pakistani Americans work in the medical field. The Association of Physicians of Pakistani Descent of North America, APPNA, has been meeting in various locations across the United States for the past 30 years. As of 2022, there were more than 20,000 doctors practicing medicine in America who are of Pakistani descent. Pakistan is the fourth highest source of IMG doctors in the U.S. and they are chiefly concentrated in New York, California, Florida, New Jersey and Illinois. Pakistan is also the fourth highest source of foreign dentists licensed in the United States. US congressmen and congresswomen have lauded the contributions of Pakistani medical professionals to the country's healthcare system.

=== Labor ===
This table shows the areas of work that Pakistanis are employed in and compares people that are born in the U.S., those born in Pakistan and those who are American nationals:

Occupational characteristics
		% Managerial - business/financial-related occupations	% Professional related occupations	% Self-employed
FB1	Men	15.1	29.6	17.1
FB1	Women	8.8	32.0	9.6
NB2	Men	10.0	33.3	9.9
NB2	Women	15.6	50.7	7.2
NB3	Men	17.7	18.0	14.0
NB3	Women	11.9	26.7	8.2

Note: FB1 = Pakistani born, NB2 = American born Pakistani and NB3 = All American nationals

The New York Times estimated that there were 109,300 workers born in Pakistan in all occupations in the US in 2007. With the top 10 occupations in ascending order being; sales-related, managers and administrators, drivers and transportation workers, doctors, accountants and other financial specialists, computer software developers, scientists and quantitative analysts, engineers and architects, clerical and administrative staff, and teachers.

== Discrimination and Negative Sentiments ==
Since the September 11 attacks in 2001, Pakistani Americans began reporting incidents of discrimination, especially in places such as airports. After the September 11 attacks, several Pakistani Americans started identifying themselves as Indians to avoid discrimination and for better business and economic opportunities.

As a result of the November 2008 Mumbai terror attacks perpetrated by the Pakistan-based terrorist group Lashkar-e-Taiba, which killed 6 American citizens, as well as the killing of Osama bin Laden near the Pakistan Military Academy in Abottabad, there was a massive rise in anti-Pakistan sentiments.

== Politics ==
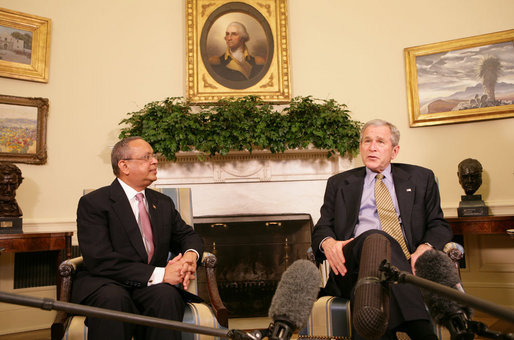
Sada Cumber, the First U.S. envoy to the Organization of the Islamic Conference, with then President Bush, February 27, 2008, in the Oval Office.

Since the second wave of immigration in 1965, the Pakistani American community has not been politically inclined, but this is now changing, with the community starting to contribute funds to their candidates of choice in both parties, and running for elected office in districts with large Pakistani American populations. In recent times, Pakistani American candidates have run for the state senate in districts of such city boroughs as Brooklyn, New York. Because the community is geographically dispersed, the formation of influential voting blocs has not generally been possible, making it difficult to for the community to make an impact on politics in this particular way. However, there are increasing efforts on the part of community leaders to ensure voter registration and involvement. In 1989, observing the need for greater political coordination, activism and advocacy, a group of Pakistani Americans founded The Pakistani American Political Action Committee (PAKPAC).

Historically, Pakistani Americans have tended to vote Republican due to the shared ideology of conservatism and the perceived notion that Republican Presidents and leaders are more pro-Pakistani than Democrats. This was evident during the 2000 Presidential Election, as Pakistani Americans voted in overwhelming numbers for Republican candidate George W. Bush. That trend reversed itself in 2004, after George W. Bush's first term in office. His policies alienated Muslims at home and abroad, and Pakistanis were no exception. When George W. Bush was up for re-election, Pakistani Americans voted for Democratic candidate John Kerry. Former Pakistan diplomat Mohammed Sadiq (diplomat) helped establish the internship program at the Pakistan Embassy in Washington, D.C. Mr. Sadiq also helped the Pakistani American community organize and launch the Pakistan Caucus in Capitol Hill.

In the past, especially during the Cold War and the war on terror under the Bush administration, there was the perceived notion that Republicans were more pro-Pakistani than Democrats. However, that trend reversed itself from 2011 onwards. Since then, there has been an increasing anti-Pakistani sentiment among Republican congressman which has alienated some Pakistani-Americans. Some Republican presidential candidates have criticised the Democrats policy toward Pakistan. During the 2012 Republican Party presidential debates, the Republican candidates questioned whether the United States could trust Pakistan. Texas governor Rick Perry called Pakistan unworthy of US aid because it had not done enough to help fight al-Qaeda. In the same year a bill was introduced by Dana Rohrabacher in the US House of Representatives proposing a hefty reduction in aid to Pakistan. President Obama has vowed to veto any proposed anti-Pakistan bills. President Obama also courted the Pakistani-American community for votes and money for his 2012 re-election campaign. In March 2012, Obama traveled to Houston, Texas for this purpose and at a dinner organised by Pakistani entrepreneurs, the President managed to raise $3.4 million in just a few hours for his re-election campaign. President Obama also pledged to continue sending aid and selling military equipment to Pakistan. According to polls, most Pakistani-Americans have now switched their votes to the Democratic Party.

In 2013, during the second inauguration of Barack Obama, the re-elected President praised the members of the Pakistani community in America and said, "I am about to go speak to the crowd in Chicago, but I wanted to thank you first. I want you to know that this was not fate and it was not an accident. You made this happen." Talking to the Daily Times via telephone, US business leader Muhammad Saeed Sheikh said Obama in his address told that he would spend the rest of his presidency honoring the Pakistani-American support and doing what he can to finish what he started. Obama continued his praise and said, "You organised yourselves block by block. You took ownership of this campaign 5 and 10 dollars at a time. And when it was not easy, you pressed forward."

In the 2016 presidential election, a majority of Pakistani Americans (88%) voted for Hillary Clinton. An exit poll conducted by AALDEF showed that an overwhelming majority (89%) of Pakistani Americans backed Joe Biden in the 2020 presidential election.

In January 2019, Sadaf Jaffer became the first female Pakistani-American mayor, the first female Muslim American mayor, and the first female South Asian mayor in the United States, of Montgomery in Somerset County, New Jersey.

In January 2021, Ali Zaidi (lawyer) became the first deputy White House National Climate Advisor serving in the Joe Biden administration.

In March 2021, President Biden nominated Dilawar Syed to serve as Deputy Administrator of the Small Business Administration.

In June 2021, Lina Khan became the Chair of the Federal Trade Commission.

== Relations with Pakistan ==
Pakistani Americans protesting in Rochester, NY against President Musharraf's imposition of emergency rule in November 2007.

Several paid TV channels are available for viewing; Pakistani TV serials, reality TV shows and political talk shows are popular among expatriates. These channels can also be viewed on the internet. Pakistani Americans maintain a deep interest in the society and politics of their country of origin. Funds are raised by the community in the US for various political parties and groups in Pakistan. From all the Pakistani diaspora, Pakistani Americans raised the largest number of funds to help Pakistan due to the 2005 earthquake. Tensions among ethnic groups like the Sindhis, Punjabis, Pashtuns, and Balochis in Pakistan are not reflected in interaction between these subgroups in the US.

The Pakistani community in the United States also remits the largest share of any Pakistani diaspora community since 2002/03, surpassing those from Saudi Arabia which from 2000/01 were $309.9 million and increased to $1.25 billion by 2007/08 and during the same period remittances from the United States increased from $73.3 million to $1.72 billion.

In 2012 the Election Commission of Pakistan granted Overseas Pakistanis the right to vote in future Pakistani general elections. By allowing the setting up of polling stations in embassies and consulates, this move was welcomed by those Pakistanis living abroad particularly in America who stated "Overseas Pakistanis make enormous contributions to the development of Pakistan".

=== Travel to Pakistan ===
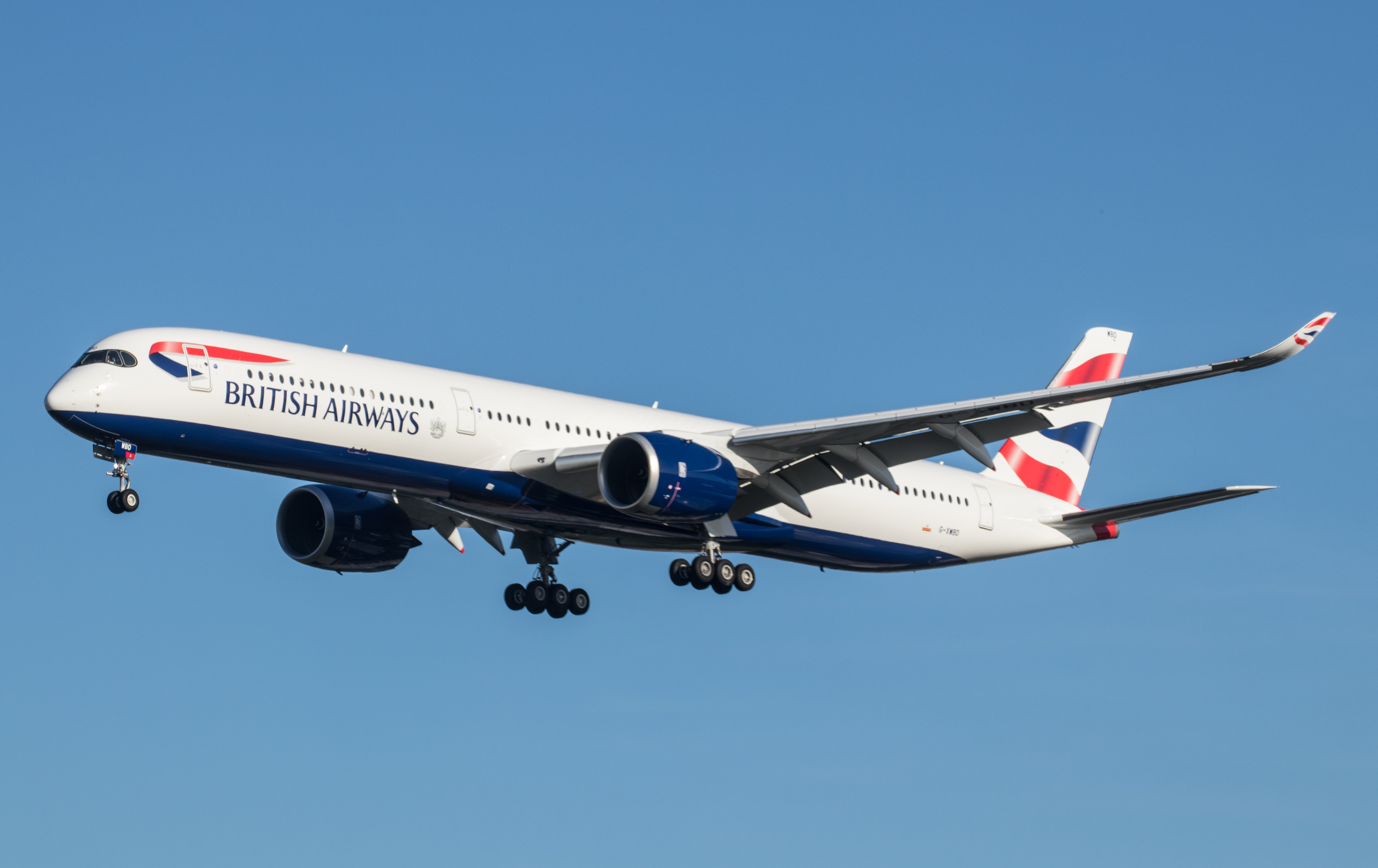
British Airways is the only Western airline serving Pakistan

Traditionally British Airways has been the main route to Pakistan because London is halfway between Pakistan and the United States. Pan Am was the last full American carrier to pull out of Karachi airport during the late 1980s, due to financial structuring and security concerns following the hijacking of Flight 73 on 5 September 1986. Since the September 11, 2001 terror attacks, the hope of American carriers like United, Delta, and American having direct services to Pakistan was no longer possible, although they operate by codesharing certain flights through other carriers with transit stops. In order to avoid stopping somewhere with poor human rights, Pakistani Americans are liaising for a resumption with EU Carriers such as Lufthansa, Turkish Airlines, or Gulf carriers like Etihad, Emirates, or Qatar Airways.

Non-stop flights on certain routes have been operated by Pakistan International Airlines, but in June 2020, the US FAA along with the European Union Aviation Safety Agency (EASA) prohibited flights from PIA due to pilots certification concerns after a major scandal erupted.

== In American popular culture ==
- Nadia Ali is a Grammy Award-nominated singer-songwriter, prominent in electronic dance music and the voice of iiO's 2001 single "Rapture", which dominated dance charts across the world.
- In the comedy television series Silicon Valley, Dinesh Chugtai is the lead software engineer in the fictional tech company Pied Piper. He is originally from Islamabad and is often seen speaking Urdu and making remarks about his homeland. Dinesh has a sarcastic personality and is known for his frequent quarrels with co-worker Bertram Gilfoyle. The character is played by Pakistani-American actor Kumail Nanjiani.
- In the sitcom Seinfeld, Babu Bhatt is a Pakistani immigrant befriended by Jerry Seinfeld in the episode "The Cafe". He appears again in "The Visa", in which he moves into Jerry's building, but Babu is deported to Pakistan due to Jerry not giving him his immigration paperwork (which was mistakenly delivered to his mailbox).
- Mr. Capone-E is a rapper from San Gabriel Valley in Los Angeles, California.
- Nadia Yassir, a character on the hit TV show 24, portrayed a fictional Pakistani American.
- In 2007, The CW aired the comedy series Aliens in America. The show is about a Wisconsin family that hosts a Pakistani exchange student.
- Faran Tahir is a Pakistani-American actor who has appeared in American television shows such as 24, Monk, and Justice. He also starred as the captain in the 2009 Star Trek film.
- Iqbal Theba is a Pakistani actor who played Principal Figgins on Glee
- The latest character in Marvel Comics to take up the mantle of Ms. Marvel is Kamala Khan, a Pakistani American in the Millennial Generation (Generation Y). Her character and comic (of which she is the title character) have received critical acclaim, along with being a commercial success. A Ms. Marvel TV series was released, with Pakistani-Canadian actress Iman Vellani playing the title character. Vellani reprises the role in the 2023 film The Marvels.
- The Kominas are a Boston-based Pakistani American band, prominent in the punk and taqwacore scenes, appearing in the documentary film Taqwacore in 2009.
- The fourth season of the American thriller television series Homeland takes place in Islamabad, Pakistan.
- The American comedy television series The Brink focuses on a geopolitical crisis in Pakistan.
- The American military drama television series Last Resort is set in Pakistan.
- Madam Secretary's first season's episode three is based on a diplomatic crises with Pakistan.
- The 2016 HBO miniseries The Night Of revolves around a Pakistani-American family based in Queens, New York.
- Dilshad Vadsaria is a Pakistani-American actress who played Rebecca Logan on the ABC Family television program Greek
- The 2025 Hulu comedy series Deli Boys depicts a pair of Pakistani-American young men after they discover that their late father's chain of delicatessens is, in fact, a front for drug smuggling.

== Events ==
- Pakistan day flag raising events are held throughout the US around March 23 and August 14 every year.
- Pakistan Independence Day Parade: The event is held every year around August 14 (the date Pakistan was established in 1947) in New York City
- The First International Urdu Conference was held in the United Nations Headquarters in New York in June 2000. The conference was organized by Urdu Markaz New York.
- APPNA Conference: This event is organized every year by APPNA (Association of Pakistani Physicians in North America). The conference attracts hundreds of Pakistani American physicians and their families from all over North America. APPNA's doctors have also volunteered their time and services for a free health care event taking place throughout June 2010.
- Pakistan Independence Day Festival of Battery Park: This is the largest gathering of Pakistani Americans in United States which was founded by a political and social activist, Khalid Ali.
- In April 2010, the USA Cricket Association signed a deal with the Pakistan Cricket Board (PCB) to host games in America. The PCB said that they had reached an agreement with the USA Cricket Association and anticipated games starting in 2010. This is also due to the large Pakistani American and Pakistani expatriate community residing in the United States.

== See also ==
- Overseas Pakistani
- Baloch Americans
- Pashtun Americans
- Punjabi Americans
- Punjabi Mexican Americans
- Sindhi Americans
- Americans in Pakistan
- Pakistan–United States relations
- Indian Americans
- Afghan Americans
- Iranian Americans
