= Na Band Na Baraati =

2018 film directed by Mehmood Akhtar

- film poster
- Directed by: Mehmood Akhtar
- Written by: Harish Kumar Patel
- Produced by: Zain Farooqi
- Starring: Mikaal Zulfiqar; Anzhelika Tahir; Ali Kazmi; Qavi Khan; Atiqa Odho; Shayan Khan; Nayab Khan; Komal Farooqi; Azra Mohyeddin; Sheena Lakhani
- Cinematography: Shezad Pasha
- Edited by: David Van
- Music by: Ayyaz Sonu
- Production company: Zashko Entertainment
- Distributed by: Hum Films
- Release date: June 16, 2018 (Eid al-Fitr)
- Running time: 120 minutes
- Country: Pakistan
- Language: Urdu
- Budget: Rs. 40 million
- Box office: est. Rs. 152 million

Na Band Na Baraati (Urdu: نہ بینڈ نہ باراتی) is a 2018 Pakistani romantic comedy film directed by Mahmood Akthar, written by Harish Kumar Patel and produced by Zashko Entertainment. The film stars Mikaal Zulfiqar, newcomer Shayan Khan, Nayab Khan, Komal Farooqi, Ali Kazmi, Qavi Khan, Azra Mohiuddin, Atiqa Odho and others. It was released by Hum Films on the Eid al-Fitr, 16 June 2018.

== Plot ==
The movie revolves around a typical Pakistani family living in Toronto, Canada. The story revolves around the main lead Shayan khan who plays the role of Shahid in the film. Shahid's girlfriend Ayesha accidentally marries the older brother Mikaal Zulfiqar on paper while she is married via Muslim Nikkah Rituals with the younger brother. The second lead Nayab Khan who plays the role of Zoya is Mikaal Zulfiqar's real girlfriend in the movie. Mikaal Zulfiqar and debutante Shayan Khan are playing the roles of brothers while Ali Kazmi is playing a villain who is also in love with Anzhelika Tahir (Aisha).

== Cast ==
- Mikaal Zulfiqar
- Anzhelika Tahir
- Ali Kazmi
- Qavi Khan
- Atiqa Odho
- Shayan Khan
- Nayab Khan
- Komal Farooqi
- Azra Mohyeddin as Shahid's mother
- Saram Jaffery
- Sheena Lakhani

== Development and Production ==
Mahmood Akthar directed the film Na Band Na Baraati from the screenplay by Harish Kumar Patel, which was produced by Zain Farooqi. First official trailer was released in early June 2018. The film's shooting was completed in 2016. Almost the whole movie has been shot in Canada. Initially the makers of the film had plans to release the film on 29 June but the producer of the movie Zain Farooqi said that they decided to release the film early as the Supreme Court put a temporary ban on Bollywood movies on the occasion of Eid al-Fitr to support the Pakistani cinema.

== Release ==
The film released nationwide by Hum Films on the Eid al-Fitr, 16 June 2018, and grossed only Rs. 10 million locally. However, it released internationally on 29 June and grossed more than Rs. 140 million from overseas market.

=== Home media ===
The World Television Premiere of the film was held by Geo Entertainment in June 2019, on the eve of Eid-ul-Fitar.

=== Digital media ===
The film was made available on Prime video for streaming.

=== Critical reviews ===
The Nation praised the film, and said that it "takes a slow start before the fun ride begins". Something Haute also praised it and said that it has "redeemable qualities that actually made it a fun watch". Asma Malik of Daily Pakistan also praised it and said that it "is an artistic mixture of romance and comedy", and is a "perfect treat for the Pakistani audience". Aymen Ansari of Dawn Images wrote that the film "is a maze of unamusing situations wrapped in mediocrity." Omair Alavi rated 1.5 stars out of 5 and wrote to Samaa TV that the film is a disaster, "it failed to live up to the expectations, if there were any", however, he only praised Mikaal Zulfiqar's role and the filming locations. Asjad Khan of HIP praised only Zulfiqar and Ali Kazmi, while he said, "This one, was really an uphill struggle!"

== See also ==
- List of Pakistani films of 2018
