= Wasim Akram =

Pakistani former international cricketer (born 1966)

Wasim Akram HI
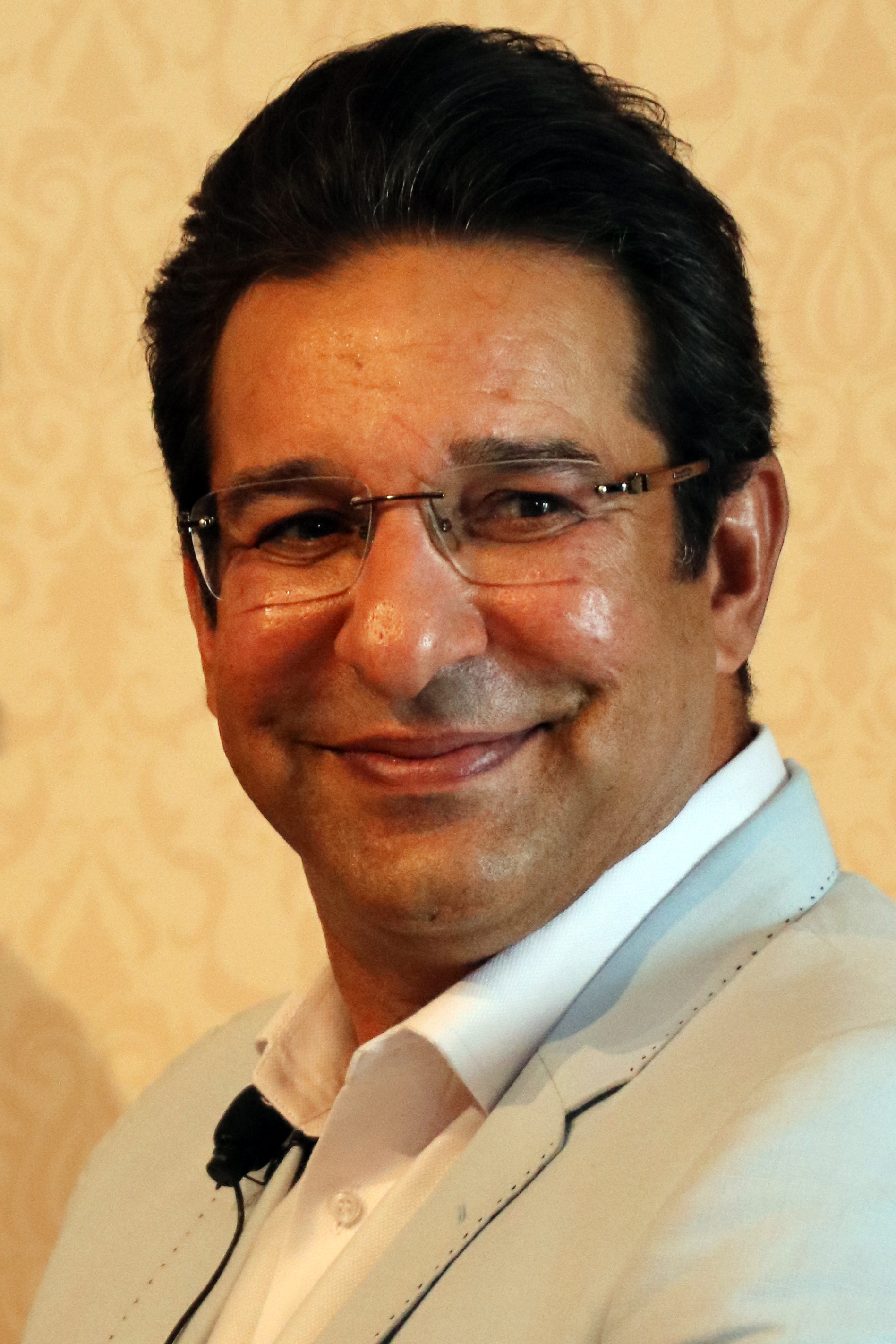
- Akram in 2018

Personal information
- Full name: Wasim Akram
- Born: 3 June 1966 (age 60); Lahore, West Pakistan
- Nickname: Sultan of Swing
- Height: 6 ft 3 in (191 cm)
- Batting: Left-handed
- Bowling: Left-arm fast
- Role: Bowling All-rounder
- Relatives: Huma Akram (m. 1995; died 2009) Shaniera Akram (m. 2013)

International information
- National side: Pakistan (1984–2003)
- Test debut (cap 102): 25 January 1985 v New Zealand
- Last Test: 8 May 2002 v Bangladesh
- ODI debut (cap 53): 23 November 1984 v New Zealand
- Last ODI: 4 March 2003 v Zimbabwe
- ODI shirt no.: 3

Domestic team information
- Years: Team
- 1984–1986: Pakistan Automobiles Corporation
- 1985–1987, 1997–1998, 2000–2001: Lahore
- 1988–1998: Lancashire
- 1992–2003: PIA
- 2003: Hampshire

Career statistics
Competition	Test	ODI	FC	LA
Matches	104	356	257	594
Runs scored	2,898	3,717	7,161	6,993
Batting average	22.64	16.52	22.73	18.90
100s/50s	3/7	0/6	7/24	0/17
Top score	257*	86	257*	89*
Balls bowled	22,627	18,186	50,278	29,719
Wickets	414	502	1,042	881
Bowling average	23.62	23.52	21.64	21.91
5 wickets in innings	25	6	70	12
10 wickets in match	5	0	16	0
Best bowling	7/119	5/15	8/30	5/11
Catches/stumpings	44/–	88/–	97/–	147/–
Medal record
Men's Cricket
Representing Pakistan
ICC Cricket World Cup
Winner	1992 Australia and New Zealand
Runner-up	1999 England-Wales -Ireland-Scotland-Netherlands
Asia Cup
Winner	2000 Bangladesh
Runner-up	1986 Sri Lanka
- Source: CricInfo, 4 April 2012

Wasim Akram (Note: Punjabi, Urdu: وَسیم اکرم) HI (born 3 June 1966) is a Pakistani cricket commentator, coach, and former cricketer and captain of the Pakistan national cricket team. Known as the "Sultan of Swing", Akram is regarded as one of the greatest bowlers of all time. In October 2013, Wasim Akram was the only Pakistani cricketer to be named in an all-time Test World XI to mark the 150th anniversary of Wisden Cricketers' Almanack. As captain, he led Pakistan to the finals of the 1999 Cricket World Cup, where they lost to Australia by 8 wickets. He was a part of the Pakistani squad which won the 1992 Cricket World Cup.

A left-arm fast bowler who could bowl with significant pace, he holds the world record for most wickets in List A cricket, with 881, and is second only to Sri Lankan off-spin bowler Muttiah Muralitharan in terms of ODI wickets, with 502 in total. He is considered to be one of the founders, and perhaps the finest exponent of, reverse swing bowling.

He was the first bowler to reach the 500-wicket mark in ODI cricket, and he did so during the 2003 World Cup. In 2002, Wisden released its only list of the best players of all time. Wasim was ranked as the best bowler in ODI of all time, with a rating of 1223.5, ahead of Allan Donald, Imran Khan, Waqar Younis, Joel Garner, Glenn McGrath and Muralitharan. Wasim took 23 four-wicket hauls in 356 ODI matches played. On 30 September 2009, Akram was one of five new members inducted into the ICC Cricket Hall of Fame. He was the bowling coach of the Kolkata Knight Riders. However, he took a break from the position for IPL 6, citing a need to spend more time with family in Karachi, and he took a further break from IPL 2017; he was replaced by Lakshmipathy Balaji.

He was working as director and bowling coach of Islamabad United in Pakistan Super League until he left to join Multan Sultans in August 2017. In October 2018, he was named in the Pakistan Cricket Board's seven-member advisory cricket committee. In November 2018, he joined PSL franchisee Karachi Kings as president.

The Government of Pakistan awarded him the Hilal-e-Imtiaz on 23 March 2019 for his lifetime achievements in the field of cricket.

== Early and personal life ==
=== Family background ===
Wasim Akram was born on 3 June 1966 to a Punjabi family in Lahore. Akram's father, Chaudhary Muhammad Akram Arain, was originally from a village near Amritsar and the family moved to Pakistani Punjab after the partition of India in 1947. Their ancestral village is called Chawinda Devi and the family belongs to the Arain community.

His father's first job was as a court proofreader and he also operated an automotive spare parts business while for some time he ran a single-screen cinema, the Niagara, located in the Ferozepur Road, because of which Akram would develop an early love for Hindi cinema.

His mother's name is Begum Akram, and he has three siblings: two elder brothers Naeem Akram and Nadeem Akram and a younger sister, Sofia Akram.

=== Education ===
He completed his early education in Lahore from Government Islamia College, Civil Lines, Lahore.

=== Health ===
At the age of 30, Akram was diagnosed with diabetes. "I remember what a shock it was because I was a healthy sportsman with no history of diabetes in my family, so I didn't expect it at all. It seemed strange that it happened to me when I was 30, but it was a very stressful time and doctors said that can trigger it." Since then he has sought to be involved in various awareness campaigns for diabetes.

=== Relationships ===
Akram married Huma Mufti in 1995. They had two sons from their marriage of 14 years: Tahmoor and Akbar. Huma died of multiple organ failure at Apollo Hospital in Chennai, India, on 25 October 2009.

For some years he was linked by the Indian media to former Miss Universe turned actress Sushmita Sen.

On 7 July 2013, it was reported that Akram had become engaged to an Australian woman, Shaniera Thompson, whom he had met while on a visit to Melbourne in 2011. Akram married Shaniera on 12 August 2013, saying he has started a new life on a happy note. He was quoted as saying, "I married Shaniera in Lahore in a simple ceremony, and this is the start of a new life for me, my wife, and for my kids."

He moved from Lahore to Karachi with his wife and children. On 3 September 2014, the couple tweeted that they were expecting their first baby—the third child of Akram. In December 2014, Shaniera gave birth to a daughter, Aiyla.

== Domestic career ==
Akram started his career as a tape ball cricketer. He later joined Ludhiana Gymkhana with the help of his friend, Khalid Mahmood. His first class cricket debut was for BCCP Patron's Eleven against New Zealand cricket team.

In 1988, Akram signed for Lancashire County Cricket Club in England. From 1988 to 1998, he opened their bowling attack in their NatWest Trophy, Benson and Hedges Cup, and Sunday League tournaments. He was a favourite of the local British fans, who used to sing a song called "Wasim for England" at Lancashire's matches. In 1998, with Akram as captain, Lancashire won the NatWest Trophy and Sunday League and finished second in the County Championship, having lost only five matches in all competitions during the season.

== International career ==
=== Test cricket ===
Akram made his Test cricket debut for Pakistan against New Zealand in 1985, and in his second Test match, he claimed 10 wickets. A few weeks prior to his selection in the Pakistan team, he was an unknown club cricketer who had failed to make it even to his college team. He came to the trials at Gaddafi Stadium in Lahore in Pakistan, but for the first two days he did not get a chance to bowl. On the third day, he got a chance; his performance convincing Javed Miandad to insist upon his inclusion in the national team. Akram was hence given an opportunity to play for Pakistan, without any significant domestic experience.

Akram's rise in international cricket was rapid during the late 1980s. He was a part of the Pakistan team that toured the West Indies in 1988. However, a groin injury impeded his career in the late 1980s. Following two surgeries, he re-emerged in the 1990s as a fast bowler who focused more on swing and accurate bowling.

Wasim Akram is currently the highest wicket taker for Pakistan in test cricket with 414 wickets.

=== One Day International ===
Akram started his ODI career against New Zealand in Pakistan in 1984 under the captaincy of Zaheer Abbas. He rose to prominence by taking five wickets in his 3rd ODI against Australia in the 1985 Benson & Hedges World Championship. His wickets included those of Kepler Wessels, Dean Jones, and captain Allan Border. Wasim Akram is currently the highest wicket taker for Pakistan in One Day International cricket

=== Early days ===
In the 1984–85 Rothmans Four-Nations Cup and the 1985–86 Rothmans Sharjah Cup, Akram took five wickets with a run rate of less than 3.50. The 1985–1986 Austral-Asia Cup involved Australia, India, New Zealand, Pakistan and Sri Lanka, and was played in Sharjah, UAE. Akram, with the help of Abdul Qadir, bowled out New Zealand's batting line-up for 64 in the second semi-final of the cup. Pakistan won that game with more than 27 overs to spare, obtaining one of the biggest wins in Pakistani history. In the final against India, he and Imran Khan shared five wickets. Akram took 3 wickets for 42 runs, including Dilip Vengsarkar and Ravi Shastri.

In the 1987 Cricket World Cup held for the 1st time in South Asia, Akram took 7 wickets in 7 matches at an average of 42.14. Akram played West Indies, Sri Lanka and England twice. All group matches were played in Pakistan.

In the 1988–89 Benson and Hedges World Series, Akram managed figures of 4 for 25 against Australia.

=== Emergence ===
Akram took his hundredth wicket at Sharjah during the 1989–1990 Champions Trophy, the 2nd Match against West Indies. His 100th wicket was that of Curtly Ambrose. In that match, he took a five-wicket haul for the second time in his career. In the same match, Akram took his first hat-trick against West Indies. All three batsman were bowled out. On 4 May 1990 in Sharjah, Akram took his second ODI hat-trick against Australia. All three batsmen were bowled this time as well.

His best years in the late 1980s were from 1986 to 1989, during which time he took 100 wickets at 22.71 runs per wicket, and his economy rate was less than 3.9 runs per over, with a total of four 4-wicket hauls. His first two hauls against Sri Lanka and Bangladesh came in Sri Lanka in 1986.

Up until December 1991, Akram took 143 wickets in 107 matches, with an average of almost 24 and an economy rate of 3.84.

=== World's best ===
Wasim Akram's results in international matches
	Matches	Won	Lost	Drawn	Tied	No result
Test	104	41	27	36	0	–
ODI	356	199	145	–	6	6

Akram was a significant figure in the 1992 Cricket World Cup held in Australia and New Zealand when Pakistan won the tournament. In the final, against England, his innings of 33 runs off 19 balls pushed Pakistan to a score of 249 runs for 6 wickets. Akram then took the wicket of Ian Botham early on during the English batting innings; and, when brought back into the bowling attack later on, with the ball reverse swinging, he produced a spell of bowling which led to Allan Lamb and Chris Lewis being bowled in successive deliveries in one over. His performances earned him the Man of the Match award for the final. In 1993, Akram took two consecutive 4-wicket hauls against Sri Lanka in Sharjah, in which 7 out of 8 wickets were either LBW or bowled.

In the 1992–1993 Total International Series in South Africa (involving Pakistan, West Indies and South Africa), he took 5 wickets against South Africa and got his 200th wicket in his 143rd match. Akram took 46 wickets in calendar year 1993, his best year ever in ODIs. His average was less than 19, with an economy rate of less than 3.8 runs per over. He took six 4-wicket hauls in 1993, the most by him in any year. In the 1996 Cricket World Cup, Akram missed the quarterfinal match against India which Pakistan lost and went out of the World Cup. Wasim's great career was often tainted by controversy, not least in the Caribbean in April 1993, his maiden tour as Pakistan's captain. During the team's stop-over in Grenada, he was arrested along with three teammates—Waqar Younis, Aaqib Javed and Mushtaq Ahmed—and two female British tourists; he was charged with possession of marijuana. Between 1994 and 1996, he took 84 wickets in 39 matches.

From January 1992 to December 1997, Akram played 131 matches and took 198 wickets at an average of 21.86, with 14 4-wicket hauls in ODIs. In September 1998, he first announced his retirement from international cricket and hired a retired judge to help him fight match-fixing allegations levelled against him. Akram called the allegations "a conspiracy, especially within the board". He added, "Unfortunately I have to leave cricket. When allegations arise you need to fight it out. You can't just sit back.... I would love to carry on but I simply can't. But I'm happy because I know that I have done nothing wrong." However, he reconsidered his decision on the insistence of chairman of the Pakistan Cricket Board (PCB), Khalid Mahmood.

=== Late career ===
In 1999, he led Pakistan to the finals of the World Cup where they capitulated and were defeated by Australia in the final by eight wickets with almost 30 overs to spare. This was the start of the match-fixing controversies, as critics believed Akram had set up the match for Australia. However, none of the allegations could be proven.

He was Pakistan's best bowler in the 2003 Cricket World Cup, taking 12 wickets in 6 matches. However, Pakistan failed to reach the super six of the tournament, and Akram was one of the eight players to be sacked by the PCB as a result.

== Records ==
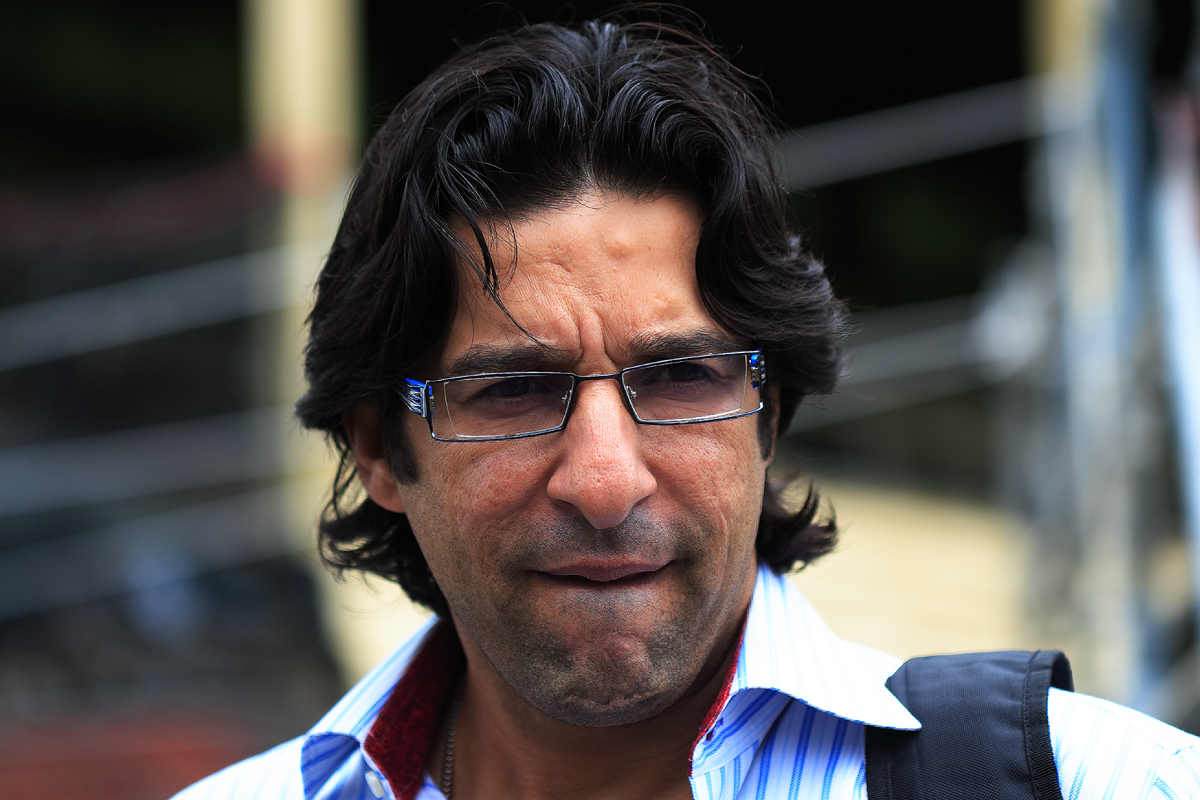
Akram in 2007.

Akram won 17 Man-of-the-Match awards in 104 Tests. He took four hat-tricks in international cricket—two in ODIs and two in Tests. As a result, he shares the record for most international hat-tricks with Lasith Malinga. He finished with 22 Man-of-the-Match awards in ODIs. In 199 ODI match wins, he took 326 wickets at under 19 apiece with a run rate of 3.70 and took 18 four-wicket hauls. His 257 not-out against Zimbabwe in 1996 is the highest innings by a number-8 batsman in Tests. He hit 12 sixes in that game, and it stands to this day as the record for the most sixes by any player in a single Test innings.

Prior to his retirement, he was one of eight senior players dropped for the 2003 Sharjah Cup, and was then omitted from the Pakistan squad for the subsequent Bank Alfalah Cup triangular series. Due to his omission from the team, he did not participate in a farewell match. Akram fulfilled his contract play for Hampshire until the end of the English season.

== Post-retirement ==
=== Media career ===
Since retiring from cricket, Akram has worked and taken up commentary for television networks and can currently be seen as a sports commentator for ESPN Star Sports and ARY Digital among others. He did commentary on a variety of sporting tournaments including the 2009 Women's Cricket World Cup in Australia, the 2009 ICC World Twenty20 in England, the 2009 ICC Champions Trophy in South Africa, and the 2011 ICC World Cup in India, Sri Lanka and Bangladesh.

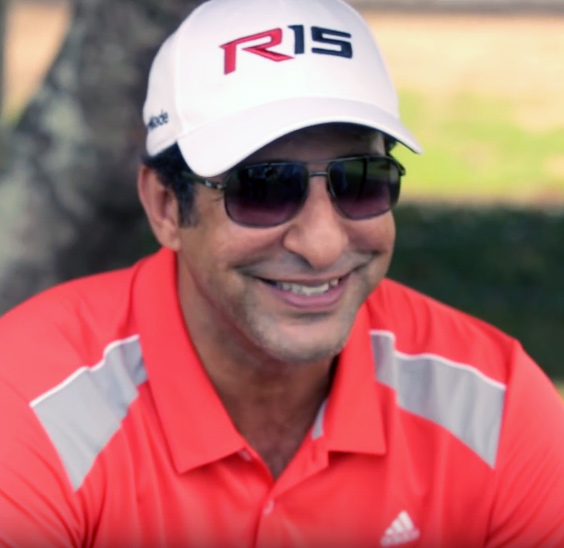
Wasim Akram during IPL, 2015

=== Coaching career ===
In 2010, Akram was appointed the bowling coach consultant of Kolkata Knight Riders, the Indian Premier League team for Kolkata. Sourav Ganguly was always keen to have Akram as the bowling coach for India, during the former's stint as Indian captain. Although this never happened, his dreams were realised to some extent, when Akram was appointed as the bowling coach cum mentor for the franchise. Akram has thus been playing a vital role in the grooming of Indian pacers like Mohammed Shami and Umesh Yadav, who owe their success in international cricket a lot to the bowling legend. While working for the Kolkata Knight Riders, he was also responsible for the signing of Pakistani domestic left-arm fast-bowler Mohammad Irfan. Akram has also been coaching in Pakistan fast bowling camps, his most notable discovery being the teenage Pakistani bowlers Mohammad Amir and Junaid Khan. Akram has also worked as director and bowling coach of PSL franchise Islamabad United during 2016 and 2017 season. He has also worked with Multan Sultans as director and bowling coach. He is currently chairman and bowling coach of Karachi Kings. He is also currently the Vice President of Kashmir Premier League.

== Playing style and legacy ==
Over my 15 or 16 years of playing international cricket in Tests and One Day Internationals, Wasim Akram is definitely the most outstanding bowler I've ever faced.

— Former West Indies batsman Brian Lara.

During his professional career he bowled with genuine speed and hostility. Akram was a man possessed of accurate control of line and length, accompanied by seam and swing bowling skills, extended to both inswingers and outswingers. With a very quick bowling action, he could bowl equally well from both sides of the wicket. His mastery of reverse swing with the cricket ball meant he was at his most dangerous towards the end of a bowling innings, and earned him the nickname of one of the "Sultans of Swing", the other one being Waqar Younis.

"The one player who really stood out for me was Wasim Akram. It was in that tournament that we realised just what a special talent he was and how much trouble he was going to give us and the rest of the world in the years to come. What a player he was."

— Former English Allrounder Ian Botham.

As well as often being able to find the edge of the bat, Akram would also focus his bowling attack on the stumps and had a particularly lethal inswinging yorker. Of his 414 Test wickets, 193 were taken caught, 119 were taken leg before wicket and 102 were bowled. In partnership with Waqar Younis, he intimidated international batsmen in the 1990s. Together Wasim and Waqar, known as "the two Ws" of the Pakistani team, were one of the most successful bowling partnerships in cricket.

With the bat he was especially effective against spin bowlers. However, he liked to slog and was criticised for his lack of high scores and giving away his wicket too cheaply. In October 1996 he scored 257 runs not out, of the team's total of 553 against lowly Zimbabwe on a typical flat South Asian pitch at Sheikhupura. He also achieved good scores for the Pakistan team such as his scores of 123 and 45* against Australia to take Pakistan to victory in a low scoring match. His batting was also valuable sometimes to the Pakistan ODI team, such as in the Nehru Cup in 1989, when needing six runs in two balls to win the match, he hit the first delivery he faced, from part-time off-spinner and batting legend, Viv Richards, for a six and secured the cup.

West Indian batting great Viv Richards rates Akram as best fast bowler he ever faced after Dennis Lillee.

In December 2012 after Ricky Ponting announced his retirement, he said that Wasim Akram and Curtly Ambrose were the toughest bowlers he had faced "Akram for the exact opposite, you could get a few runs off him, but you just knew there was an unplayable ball around the corner, be it with an old ball or with a new ball," – Ricky Ponting.

To mark 150 years of the Cricketers' Almanack, Wisden named him in an all-time Test World XI.

== Beyond cricket ==
=== Books ===
- Akram, Wasim; Murphy. Patrick (1998). Wasim. Piatkus Books. ISBN 978-0749918088.
- Akram, Wasim; Haigh, Gideon (2022). Sultan: A Memoir. Hardie Grant Books. ISBN 978-1743798690.

=== Modelling ===
Akram was a model at the Pantene Bridal Couture Week 2011, which was an event of Style 360.

=== Business ===
In 2018, Akram joined Cricingif as a stakeholder director.

=== Television shows ===
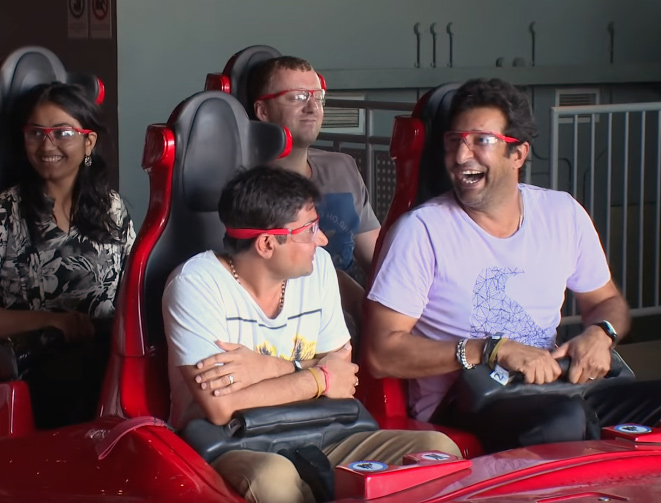
Akram in 2014 in India

Year	Show	Role	Language	Country
2008	Ek Khiladi Ek Haseena	Judge	Hindi	India
2016	The Sportsman Show	Host	Urdu	Pakistan
2017	Geo Khelo Pakistan	Host	Urdu	Pakistan
2022	Jeeto Pakistan League	Guest	Urdu	Pakistan

=== Films ===
Year	Title	Role	Notes
2023	Money Back Guarantee	Akram	Film debut

== Award and records ==
Akram was awarded Wisden Cricketer of the Year in 1993 for his sporting achievements. He was awarded Lux Style Award for Most Stylish Sports Person in 2003.

- In his Test career, Akram took 414 wickets in 104 matches, a Pakistani record, at an average of 23.62 and scored 2,898 runs, at an average of 22.64.
- In One Day Internationals, Akram took 502 wickets in 356 appearances, at an average of 23.52 and scored 3,717 runs, at an average of 16.52.
- Akram was the first bowler in international cricket to take more than 400 wickets in both forms of the game and only Muttiah Muralitharan has since achieved this.
- Akram also held the record for the most wickets in Cricket World Cups, a total of 55 in 38 matches. Australia's Glenn McGrath broke the record during the 2007 Cricket World Cup, ending with a final tally of 71 from 39 matches. On passing Wasim's record, McGrath said, "Wasim Akram, to me, is one of the greatest bowlers of all time. Left-armer, swung it both ways with the new ball and he was so dangerous with the old ball. To go past him is something I will always remember. Probably the other side of the coin is that if you play long enough, you're going to break records here and there." He is currently the fourth highest wicket taker in world cups.
- Akram is one of the only two bowlers, along with Lasith Malinga, that achieved four or more hat-tricks in international cricket, with two each in Tests and One Day Internationals. He was the third of only four bowlers to have taken two Test cricket hat-tricks, the others being Hugh Trumble, Jimmy Matthews and Stuart Broad. Akram was also the first of only five bowlers to have taken two One Day International cricket hat-tricks. Akram's Test hat-tricks are significant, since they were taken in consecutive Test matches in the same series, a game played against Sri Lanka in the 1998–99 Asian Test Championship. Akram is also one of only two bowlers to have taken both a Test match and One Day International hat-trick, the other being Pakistan fast bowler, Mohammad Sami.
- Playing in a Test series against the West Indies at Lahore in 1990–1991, he became one of only six players to have taken four wickets in an over during a Test match. In Akram's case, these achievement was not part of a hat-trick, the third ball he delivered to the batting opposition was a dropped catch, which allowed a single run.
- Akram has also achieved the highest score by a number eight batsman in Test cricket when he scored 257 runs not out from 363 balls against Zimbabwe at Sheikhupura. The innings contained 12 sixes which is also a world record for highest number of sixes in any Test innings.
- He also has the joint-third highest number of Man of the Match awards in Test cricket, with seventeen.
- He has scored the second-highest number of runs in One Day International matches by a player who has never scored a One Day International hundred, after Misbah-ul-Haq. His highest score was 86 runs.
- He is the only Test cricketer in the world (as of Feb 2013) to take ten or more wickets three times in a test match and still end up on the losing team.
- He holds the record for facing the most balls in a test match as well as in an innings as number 8 batsman (363 balls)
- First bowler to take 500 ODI wickets and still holds the record for taking the most ODI wickets as seamer (502)
- Wasim Akram is the person to grab 100+ ODI wickets at the same ground. He jointly holds the record for taking the most wickets in ODI history at a single ground (122 at Sharjah Cricket Stadium), tied with Shakib Al Hasan. Waqar Younis, the second person to grab 100+ ODI wickets at a single ground, also did in Sharjah. He ranks second overall with 114 wickets.
- Holds the record for taking the most ODI wickets as captain (158)

== Controversies ==
=== Ball tampering ===
In 1992, after he had been successful against the English batsmen, accusations of ball tampering began to appear in the English media, though no video evidence of foul play was ever found. Akram and Younis had been able to obtain prodigious amounts of movement from both new and old cricket balls. The skill of the reverse swing delivery was relatively unknown in England and around the cricketing world during that period.

=== Match fixing ===
A far larger controversy was created when critics alleged that he was involved in match fixing. An inquiry commission was set up by the Pakistan Cricket Board headed by a Pakistan high court judge, Malik Mohammad Qayyum. The judge wrote in his report that:

This commission feels that all is not well here and that Wasim Akram is not above board. He has not co-operated with this Commission. It is only by giving Wasim Akram the benefit of the doubt after Ata-ur-Rehman changed his testimony in suspicious circumstances that he has not been found guilty of match-fixing. He cannot be said to be above suspicion.

== See also ==
- Pakistan Cricket Board
- International Cricket Council
- Imran Khan
- Waqar Younis

== Autobiography ==
Akram's autobiography, titled Sultan: A Memoir, co-authored by cricket writer Gideon Haigh, was published in 2022 by HarperCollins.

== Notes ==
Sporting positions
Preceded by Aamer Sohail	Pakistan Cricket Captain; 1999–2000	Succeeded by Moin Khan
Awards and achievements
Preceded by Curtly Ambrose	Wisden Leading Cricketer in the World; 1992	Succeeded by Shane Warne
