= Shaniera Akram =

Australian-Pakistani social worker

- Born: Shaniera Thompson; 20 March 1982 (age 44); Melbourne, Victoria, Australia
- Citizenship: Australian; Pakistani
- Education: Firbank Grammar
- Occupation: Social worker
- Years active: 2013–present
- Organisation: The Akram Foundation
- Spouse: Wasim Akram (m. 2013)
- Children: 1

Shaniera Akram (née Thompson; born 20 March 1982) is an Australian social worker based in Pakistan. She is the wife of former cricketer Wasim Akram.

== Early and personal life ==
Shaniera was born on 20 March 1982. Hailing from the Melbourne suburb of Brighton, she describes herself as a "typical Australian girl" who lived a normal life, and worked as a public relations consultant. She received her early education from a private girls' school. She was raised with three sisters, in a well-connected household which counted Sam Newman and Shane Warne as family friends.

Shaniera met Wasim in 2011 at a dinner with mutual friends whilst he was visiting Melbourne for cricket commentating duties, but did not know who he was back then or admittedly have much interest in cricket; Wasim explained: "I did tell her – "I’m kind of a big deal back home" – but that card didn't work. I had to charm her. We exchanged numbers, texted and emailed, and whenever I was back here we would get together." Shaniera says although the relationship was not romantic at first, and despite being from different countries and generations, the two enjoyed each other's company and were able to click. According to Wasim, she showed him her city and introduced him to Australian culture, which he found very family-oriented, sports-based, and having an affinity for outdoor living – similar to his life in Pakistan. He proposed marriage to Shaniera on a bended knee at her home.

At the time, Wasim was coping with the death of his childhood love and first wife Huma (who died from multiple organ failure in 2009), and was struggling in life – especially in raising his two children. Talking about Huma, Shaniera mentions they've kept her memory alive through photos, planting a tree, observing her birthday and death anniversary, and through her children. Shaniera married Wasim at a simple nikah ceremony in the summer of 2013 at his hometown Lahore, on 12 August. They moved to Karachi thereafter, where they live near the beachfront area of Clifton. The couple had their first daughter, Aiyla, on 27 December 2014. As a mother, she picks up and drops off her daughter to school, and takes her to dance and judo classes. She is also a step-mother to Wasim's two sons, Tahmoor (b. 1996) and Akbar (b. 2001), from his earlier marriage. She acknowledges them as an important part of her life, and has become a source of support and advice for both.

Shaniera mentions that transitioning to her new life in Pakistan and adapting to the culture was challenging initially, but she found the local people warm and hospitable. She had adopted Islam prior to her marriage, learned to become accustomed to the various customs and traditions, and also improved her Urdu. She has frequently appeared in YouTube videos with British-Pakistani television figure George Fulton, where the two explore Pakistani culture from the lens of two Westerners living in Karachi, in humorous ways. On the question of where her loyalties lie when Australia faces Pakistan in cricket, she commented that although she was "born and bred an Australian" and loved her country, Pakistan played a big part of who she was today and that for the long haul, she was "with Pakistan all the way."

== Career ==
Shaniera started her career in fashion at the age of 21 and owned a clothing boutique. Later, she switched to public relations (PR) and events as a consultant. She has worked on major Australian fashion festivals, international events, clothing brand store openings, restaurants, and product launches.

In 2023, she made her acting debut alongside her husband in the Pakistani crime comedy film, Money Back Guarantee, which was released on Eid-ul Fitr.

=== Social work ===
Shaniera is actively involved in The Akram Foundation, engaging in various kinds of social work, community service, philanthropy projects and charitable causes. She enjoys a popular public image, often appearing on television, print media and remaining under the attention of paparazzi, which has led to her being referred to as the "national Bhabhi" and "Aussie Princess" of Pakistan. She has acquired a mass following on social media. Her work has included supporting the victims of the 2016 Lahore suicide bombing, collecting charity for hospitals, promoting health and fitness, raising environmental awareness, speaking up about road safety, recycling and access to clean drinking water, and working as an ambassador for The Fred Hollows Foundation in Pakistan which provides free treatment for the visually impaired.

In 2019, Akram tweeted pictures showing the Clifton Beach in a state of neglect, with the water filthy from litter and the beachside replete with objects such as plastic bags, blood vials and syringes. Following her call to attention, the photos went viral and the beach was swiftly cleaned within one month.

== See also ==
- List of international cricket five-wicket hauls by Wasim Akram
- Jemima Khan, British-Pakistani journalist and former wife of Imran Khan
