= Money Back Guarantee (2023 film) =

2023 Pakistani film by Faisal Qureshi

- Theatrical release poster
- Directed by: Faisal Qureshi
- Written by: Faisal Qureshi
- Produced by: Zain Farooqi
- Starring: See cast
- Cinematography: Calvin Keehoe
- Edited by: Game Over Productions
- Music by: Tyler Westen
- Production companies: Zashko Films; Game Over Productions
- Distributed by: IMGC Global (Pakistan); Zashko Films (Worldwide)
- Release date: 21 April 2023
- Country: Pakistan
- Language: Urdu
- Box office: Rs. 38.03 crore (US$1.4 million)

Money Back Guarantee is a 2023 Pakistani political satire heist crime comedy film written and directed by Faisal Qureshi (in his feature directorial debut). The film features an ensemble cast featuring Fawad Khan, Ayesha Omer, Hina Dilpazir, Ali Safina, Wasim Akram, Shayan Khan, Mikaal Zulfiqar, Gohar Rasheed, and Jan Rambo. The film was scheduled for release on 22 May 2020. However, due to the COVID-19 pandemic, the movie release was postponed. The film's musical score is composed by Tyler Westen.

The film was released worldwide on 21 April 2023. It received mixed reviews from critics for its humor, characters and subject matter, although they praised the performance of Khan.

== Premise ==
In an effort to lift themselves out of their impoverished circumstances, a gang of amateur thieves decide to rob a bank in between an ongoing manager election.

== Cast ==
- Fawad Khan as Manager Bilal Bux
- Hina Dilpazir as Sahiba Begum
- Jan Rambo as Christian Bail
- Wasim Akram as President Akram
- Mikaal Zulfiqar as Irfan Pathan
- Gohar Rasheed as Nawaz Sindhi
- Kiran Malik as Sanam Baloch
- Mani as G.A. Muhajir
- Shafaat Ali as a fictionalized version of Donald Trump
- Marhoom Ahmad Bilal as Munda Punjabi

Additionally, Ayesha Omar, Ali Safina, Shaniera Akram, Aqdas Waseem, Adnan Jaffar, Shayan Khan, Javed Sheikh, Ali Rehman Khan, Faysal Quraishi, Hajra Yamin, Muniba Mazari, George Fulton, Khadija Arshad, Ataullah Jan, and Ahsan Rahim have been cast.

== Filming ==
The filming took place in the end of 2019. The film has been shot in Karachi, while some parts have been shot in Thailand. The filming along with the soundtrack, was completed within 40 days. The Qasr-e-Noor in Lahore served as the building of Pak Bank.

== Release ==
On 6 September 2022, it was announced that film will be released worldwide on 21 April 2023. The official teaser was released on 9 September 2022.

== Music ==
The soundtrack for the movie was composed by Tyler Westen, a Hollywood music composer. The songs are written by Shani Arshad, a Pakistani film music director and songwriter, and Asfar Hussain, the lead vocalist of Bayaan. The movie features three songs which were recorded in Karachi, Lahore and New York.
