= George Fulton =

British-Pakistani journalist and television producer

George Fulton (born 10 November 1977 in Birkenhead, Merseyside, United Kingdom) is a British-Pakistani television journalist, writer and producer. Born and raised in Birkenhead, he first visited Pakistan to launch a BBC produced political talk show Question Time Pakistan. After moving to Pakistan and working on various ventures, George had launched his YouTube channel Desi George, where he frequently collaborated and produced videos featuring Shaniera Akram (Australian social worker and wife of Wasim Akram) about Pakistan and its culture.

== Personal life ==
George is the youngest among his three siblings. He is the only brother to two elder sisters, Mary and Laura. Fulton got married in Pakistan after meeting his wife, Kiran, at Telebiz (a production house) in 2002, where she was a producer. He married Kiran and stayed in the country for nine years. In 2011, the couple moved to the UK, where they lived for more than four years.

Following Kiran's mother's death, George relocated to Pakistan, where he lived in Karachi with his wife and two children from 2015 to 2023.

== Career ==
A journalist and PR professional, George, was associated with the BBC back in 2002 when work commitments brought him to Karachi, where he hosted the BBC produced political talk show Question Time Pakistan. He then produced another show for BBC titled Hard Talk Pakistan.

While staying in Pakistan, George was offered to host a TV show by Geo TV to share his experiences in Pakistan. Named ‘George ka Pakistan’, was the reality TV show that first made the British journalist known across the country. After George Fulton had traveled all over the country, plowing fields with Punjabi farmers and building Kalashnikovs with the Pashtuns, he was voted a real Pakistani by the audience and was given a Pakistani passport.

Later, he joined AAJ TV, where he launched another show called News, Views and Confused, - a variation of the famous Have I Got News for You. He produced and scripted the show’s first season, before moving on to produce Aaj TV’s morning show along with his wife titled Kiran Aur George. The duo also hosted their show.

Upon his return to Pakistan, George worked as Director of PR for M&C Saatchi before establishing his YouTube channel.

He was also featured in 2023 Pakistani film Money Back Guarantee, as George. His only line was "Hi, i'm George!" which was repeated twice over the course of the 2 hour film.
