= Shayan Khan =

Pakistani movie producer

Shayan Khan is a Pakistani–American actor and film producer.

== Biography ==
Khan was born in Karachi, studying at the St Michael's School, but in 1999, when he was in his teen, his family migrated to Houston, Texas in the United States with his family where he eventually started his acting career. He took some acting lessons at the Lee Strasberg Theatre and Film Institute.

In 2013, Khan was declared Mr. Pakistan. In 2018, he featured as the lead actor in Na Band Na Baraati, romantic comedy film.

In 2023, he both produced and acted in Money Back Guarantee.

While in the United States, Khan worked in the IT and real estate sectors.

== Films ==
Year	Title	Role	Producer
2018	Na Band Na Baraati	Shahid	
2023	Money Back Guarantee	Ilyas Kashmiri	Yes
