= Sultan: A Memoir =

Autobiographical book by Wasim Akram

Sultan: A Memoir is an autobiographical book by Wasim Akram, contributed by Gideon Haigh and published by HarperCollins in 2022.

Akram writes about his struggles with cocaine addiction and mentions Imran Khan.

== Contents ==
The memoir, written by cricket author Gideon Haigh, explores Akram's career, including his rise to prominence, contributions to cricket, and the 1992 Cricket World Cup victory.

Akram acknowledges his professional bonds, notably with Imran Khan and Javed Miandad, while expressing his disdain towards Ramiz Raja, Saleem Malik, and Aamer Sohail. His influence over the selection of Waqar Younis and the development of talents such as Shahid Afridi and Shoaib Akhtar are also discussed.

On personal matters, Akram openly addresses controversial issues such as the match-fixing allegations, team disputes, the Justice Qayyum report, the 1993 Grenada incident, and his cocaine addiction.

The memoir provides insights into the 1996 World Cup Bangalore Quarter final, his 1999 experiences following the Lahore meeting between Nawaz Sharif and Vajpayee, and the turbulent 1998/99 tour. Akram also reminisces about his earlier tour to India and the Nehru Cup.

The book ends with Akram's analysis of the 1999 Cricket World Cup and his criticism of political interference within the team.

== Reception ==
The book has been reviewed by Ollie Randall of The Times Literary Supplement, Rohit Mahajan of The Tribune India, Chintan Girish Modi of Hindustan Times, R. Kaushik of Moneycontrol and K C Vijaya Kumar of The Hindu.
