= Pakathon =

US not-for-profit

Pakathon is a Boston-based, registered global non-profit organization with eight global chapters in four countries: Pakistan, the United States, Canada, and Australia. Founded in 2013, Pakathon aims to create jobs through innovation and entrepreneurship by mobilizing the Pakistani diaspora.
