= 2021 Karachi Kings season =

Overview of Karachi kings in 2021

Karachi kings
2021 season
- Coach: Herschelle Gibbs
- Captain: Babar Azam
- PSL 2021: Playoffs (4th)
- Most runs: Babar Azam (554)
- Most wickets: Mohammad Ilyas (8)

The Karachi Kings is a franchise cricket team that represents Karachi, Sindh, Pakistan in the Pakistan Super League (PSL). The team was coached by Herschelle Gibbs and captained by Imad Wasim. The team won their maiden PSL title in 2020, which make them the defending champion in 2021.

== Kit manufacturers and sponsors ==
Kit manufacturer	Shirt sponsor (chest)	Shirt sponsor (back)	Chest branding	Sleeve branding
AJ Sports	ARY Laguna	Hashmi Ispaghol	Pepsi	Imtiaz Super Market, Mughal Steel, ME Body Spray

Playing kit

== Teams standings ==
=== Points table ===
Pos	Team	Pld	W	L	NR	Pts	NRR
1	Islamabad United (3rd)	10	8	2	0	16	0.859
2	Multan Sultans (C)	10	5	5	0	10	1.050
3	Peshawar Zalmi (R)	10	5	5	0	10	0.586
4	Karachi Kings (4th)	10	5	5	0	10	−0.115
5	Lahore Qalandars	10	5	5	0	10	−0.589
6	Quetta Gladiators	10	2	8	0	4	−1.786

Source: ESPNcricinfo
- The top 4 teams qualified for the playoffs
- advanced to Qualifier
- advanced to Eliminator 1

== League fixtures ==
Match 1
20 February 2021
20:00 (N)
Scorecard

Quetta Gladiators; 121 (18.2 overs)	v	Karachi Kings; 126/3 (13.5 overs)
Chris Gayle 39 (24); Arshad Iqbal 3/16 (4 overs)		Joe Clarke 46 (23); Mohammad Hasnain 2/18 (4 overs)

Karachi Kings won by 7 wickets
National Stadium, Karachi
Umpires: Aleem Dar (Pak) and Ahsan Raza (Pak)
Player of the match: Arshad Iqbal (Karachi Kings)

- Karachi Kings won the toss and elected to field.

Match 6
24 February 2021
19:00 (N)
Scorecard

Karachi Kings; 196/3 (20 overs)	v	Islamabad United; 197/5 (19.1 overs)
Sharjeel Khan 105 (59); Hussain Talat 1/25 (2 overs)		Iftikhar Ahmed 49* (37); Waqas Maqsood 1/22 (2.1 overs)

Islamabad United won by 5 wickets
National Stadium, Karachi
Umpires: Aleem Dar (Pak) and Rashid Riaz (Pak)
Player of the match: Alex Hales (Islamabad United)

- Islamabad United won the toss and elected to field.

Match 9
27 February 2021
14:00 (D/N)
Scorecard

Multan Sultans; 195/6 (20 overs)	v	Karachi Kings; 198/3 (18.5 overs)
James Vince 45 (29); Arshad Iqbal 2/36 (4 overs)		Babar Azam 90* (60); Shahnawaz Dahani 2/28 (3 overs)

Karachi Kings won by 7 wickets
National Stadium, Karachi
Umpires: Richard Illingworth (Eng) and Rashid Riaz (Pak)
Player of the match: Babar Azam (Karachi Kings)

- Karachi Kings won the toss and elected to field.

Match 11
28 February 2021
19:00 (N)
Scorecard

Karachi Kings; 186/9 (20 overs)	v	Lahore Qalandars; 189/4 (19.2 overs)
Sharjeel Khan 64 (39); Shaheen Afridi 3/27 (4 overs)		Fakhar Zaman 83 (54); Waqas Maqsood 1/34 (3 overs)

Lahore Qalandars won by 6 wickets
National Stadium, Karachi
Umpires: Richard Illingworth (Eng) and Ahsan Raza (Pak)
Player of the match: Shaheen Afridi (Lahore Qalandars)

- Lahore Qalandars won the toss and elected to field.

Match 13
3 March 2021
14:00 (D/N)
Scorecard

Peshawar Zalmi; 188/5 (20 overs)	v	Karachi Kings; 191/4 (19.3 overs)
Ravi Bopara 58* (40); Abbas Afridi 2/27 (4 overs)		Babar Azam 77* (47); Saqib Mahmood 2/41 (4 overs)

Karachi Kings won by 6 wickets
National Stadium, Karachi
Umpires: Aleem Dar (Pak) and Imran Javed (Pak)
Player of the match: Mohammad Nabi (Karachi Kings)

- Karachi Kings won the toss and elected to field.

Match 16
10 June 2021
18:00 (D/N)
Scorecard

Multan Sultans; 176/5 (20 overs)	v	Karachi Kings; 164/7 (20 overs)
Rilee Rossouw 44 (24); Thisara Perera 2/12 (3 overs)		Babar Azam 85* (63); Imran Khan 3/28 (4 overs)

Multan Sultans won by 12 runs
Sheikh Zayed Cricket Stadium, Abu Dhabi
Umpires: Aleem Dar (Pak) and Shozab Raza (Pak)
Player of the match: Rilee Rossouw (Multan Sultans)

- Karachi Kings won the toss and elected to field.

Match 22
14 June 2021
21:00 (N)
Scorecard

Karachi Kings; 190/4 (20 overs)	v	Islamabad United; 191/2 (18.4 overs)
Babar Azam 81 (54); Akif Javed 1/31 (4 overs); Hasan Ali 1/31 (4 overs)		Colin Munro 88* (56); Waqas Maqsood 1/27 (4 overs)

Islamabad United won by 8 wickets
Sheikh Zayed Cricket Stadium, Abu Dhabi
Umpires: Rashid Riaz (Pak) and Asif Yaqoob (Pak)
Player of the match: Iftikhar Ahmed (Islamabad United)

- Islamabad United won the toss and elected to field.

Match 24
15 June 2021
23:00 (N)
Scorecard

Karachi Kings; 108/9 (20 overs)	v	Peshawar Zalmi; 109/4 (11 overs)
Abbas Afridi 27* (18); Abrar Ahmed 3/14 (4 overs)		Hazratullah Zazai 63 (26); Imad Wasim 2/2 (2 overs)

Peshawar Zalmi won by 6 wickets
Sheikh Zayed Cricket Stadium, Abu Dhabi
Umpires: Ahsan Raza (Pak) and Shozab Raza (Pak)
Player of the match: Hazratullah Zazai (Peshawar Zalmi)

- Peshawar Zalmi won the toss and elected to field.

Match 27
17 June 2021
23:00 (N)
Scorecard

Karachi Kings; 176/5 (20 overs)	v	Lahore Qalandars; 169/7 (20 overs)
Babar Azam 54 (44); Rashid Khan 2/25 (4 overs)		Mohammad Hafeez 36 (36); Noor Ahmad 2/19 (4 overs)

Karachi Kings won by 7 runs
Sheikh Zayed Cricket Stadium, Abu Dhabi
Umpires: Ahsan Raza (Pak) and Asif Yaqoob (Pak)
Player of the match: Noor Ahmad (Karachi Kings)

- Karachi Kings won the toss and elected to bat.

Match 29
19 June 2021
18:00 (D/N)
Scorecard

Karachi Kings; 176/7 (20 overs)	v	Quetta Gladiators; 162/6 (20 overs)
Danish Aziz 45 (13); Arish Ali Khan 4/28 (4 overs)		Sarfaraz Ahmed 51* (33); Mohammad Ilyas 3/39 (4 overs)

Karachi Kings won by 14 runs
Sheikh Zayed Cricket Stadium, Abu Dhabi
Umpires: Shozab Raza (Pak) and Asif Yaqoob (Pak)
Player of the match: Danish Aziz (Karachi Kings)

- Karachi Kings won the toss and elected to bat.

== Playoffs ==
=== Eliminator ===
==== Eliminator 1 ====
Match 32
21 June 2021
23:00 (N)
Scorecard

Karachi Kings; 175/7 (20 overs)	v	Peshawar Zalmi; 176/5 (19.5 overs)
Babar Azam 53 (45); Mohammad Irfan 2/21 (4 overs)		Hazratullah Zazai 77 (38); Thisara Perera 2/10 (2 overs)

Peshawar Zalmi won by 5 wickets
Sheikh Zayed Cricket Stadium, Abu Dhabi
Umpires: Aleem Dar (Pak) and Shozab Raza (Pak)
Player of the match: Hazratullah Zazai (Peshawar Zalmi)

- Peshawar Zalmi won the toss and elected to field.
