= 2008 ICC Awards =

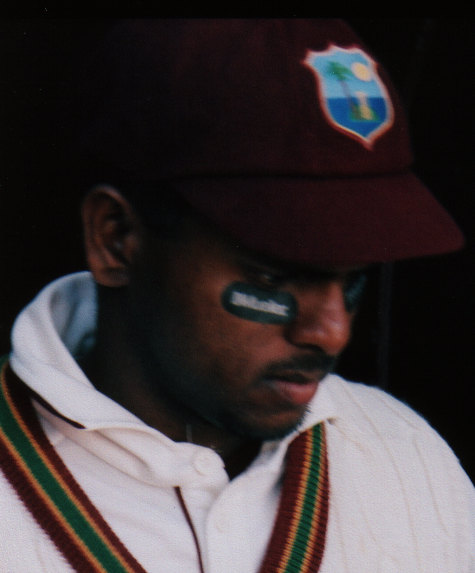
- 2008 Cricketer of the Year Shivnarine Chanderpaul
- Date: 10 September 2008
- Presented by: ICC

Highlights
- Cricketer of the Year: (Cricket West Indies) Shivnarine Chanderpaul (1st award)
- Test Player of the Year: (South Africa) Dale Steyn (1st award)
- ODI Player of the Year: (India) MS Dhoni (1st award)
- Emerging Player of the Year: (Sri Lanka) Ajantha Mendis
- Website: www.icc-cricket.com

The 2008 ICC Awards were held on 10 September 2008 in Dubai, United Arab Emirates. Previous events were held in London (2004), Sydney (2005), Mumbai (2006) and Johannesburg (2007). The ICC had been hosting ICC Awards since 2004 and was into its fifth year. They were presented in association with the Federation of International Cricketers' Associations (FICA) and honours for the Twenty20 International Performance of the Year were also awarded for the first time. The ICC awards the Sir Garfield Sobers Trophy to the Cricketer of the Year, which is considered to be the most prestigious award in world cricket.

== Selection Committee ==
Nominees were voted on by a 25-person panel of current and ex-players and officials from among players chosen by the ICC Selection Committee, chaired by ICC Cricket Hall of Famer Clive Lloyd.

Selection Committee members:

- (Cricket West Indies) Clive Lloyd (chairman)
- (Australia) Greg Chappell
- (South Africa) Shaun Pollock
- (Sri Lanka) Sidath Wettimuny
- (Bangladesh) Athar Ali Khan

== Award categories and winners ==
=== Cricketer of the Year ===
- (Cricket West Indies) Shivnarine Chanderpaul

=== Test Player of the Year ===
- (South Africa) Dale Steyn

=== ODI Player of the Year ===
- (India) MS Dhoni

=== Twenty20 International Performance of the Year ===
- (India) Yuvraj Singh, for scoring 58 runs off 16 deliveries against England at the 2007 ICC World Twenty20 in South Africa on 19 September 2007

=== Emerging Player of the Year ===
- (Sri Lanka) Ajantha Mendis

=== Associate Player of the Year ===
- (Netherlands) Ryan ten Doeschate

=== Umpire of the Year ===
- (Australia) Simon Taufel

=== Women's Cricketer of the Year ===
- (England) Charlotte Edwards

=== Spirit of Cricket ===
- Sri Lanka

== ICC World XI Teams ==
=== ICC Test Team of the Year ===
Graeme Smith was selected as the captain of the Test Team of the Year. In addition to a wicket-keeper, 9 other players and a 12th man were announced as follows:

- (South Africa) Graeme Smith
- (India) Virender Sehwag
- (Sri Lanka) Mahela Jayawardene
- (Cricket West Indies) Shivnarine Chanderpaul
- (England) Kevin Pietersen
- (South Africa) Jacques Kallis
- (Sri Lanka) Kumar Sangakkara (wicket-keeper)
- (Australia) Brett Lee
- (England) Ryan Sidebottom
- (South Africa) Dale Steyn
- (Sri Lanka) Muttiah Muralitharan
- (Australia) Stuart Clark (12th man)

=== ICC ODI Team of the Year ===
Ricky Ponting was selected as the captain of the ODI Team of the Year. In addition to a wicket-keeper, 9 other players and a 12th man were announced as follows:

- (South Africa) Herschelle Gibbs
- (India) Sachin Tendulkar
- (Australia) Ricky Ponting
- (Pakistan) Younis Khan
- (Australia) Andrew Symonds
- (India) MS Dhoni (wicket-keeper)
- (Sri Lanka) Farveez Maharoof
- (New Zealand) Daniel Vettori
- (Australia) Brett Lee
- (Australia) Mitchell Johnson
- (Australia) Nathan Bracken
- (Pakistan) Salman Butt (12th man)

== Short lists ==
=== Cricketer of the Year ===
- (Cricket West Indies) Shivnarine Chanderpaul
- (Sri Lanka) Mahela Jayawardene
- (South Africa) Graeme Smith
- (South Africa) Dale Steyn

=== Test Player of the Year ===
- (Cricket West Indies) Shivnarine Chanderpaul
- (Sri Lanka) Mahela Jayawardene
- (South Africa) Jacques Kallis
- (South Africa) Dale Steyn

=== ODI Player of the Year ===
- (Australia) Nathan Bracken
- (India) MS Dhoni
- (India) Sachin Tendulkar
- (Pakistan) Mohammad Yousuf

=== Twenty20 International Performance of the Year ===
- (Cricket West Indies) Chris Gayle
- (India) MS Dhoni
- (Australia) Brett Lee
- (India) Yuvraj Singh

=== Emerging Player of the Year ===
- (England) Stuart Broad
- (Sri Lanka) Ajantha Mendis
- (South Africa) Morné Morkel
- (India) Ishant Sharma

=== Associate Player of the Year ===
- (Netherlands) Ryan ten Doeschate
- (Ireland) Niall O'Brien
- (Kenya) Alex Obanda
- (Kenya) Thomas Odoyo

=== Umpire of the Year ===
- (England) Mark Benson
- (Pakistan) Aleem Dar
- (Australia) Steve Davis
- (South Africa) Rudi Koertzen
- (Australia) Simon Taufel

=== Women's Cricketer of the Year ===
- (New Zealand) Nicola Browne
- (England) Charlotte Edwards
- (Australia) Lisa Sthalekar
- (England) Claire Taylor

=== Spirit of Cricket ===
- Bangladesh
- New Zealand
- Sri Lanka
- West Indies

== See also ==
- International Cricket Council
- ICC Awards
- Sir Garfield Sobers Trophy (Cricketer of the Year)
- ICC Test Player of the Year
- ICC ODI Player of the Year
- David Shepherd Trophy (Umpire of the Year)
- ICC Women's Cricketer of the Year
- ICC Test Team of the Year
- ICC ODI Team of the Year
