= 2006 ICC Awards =

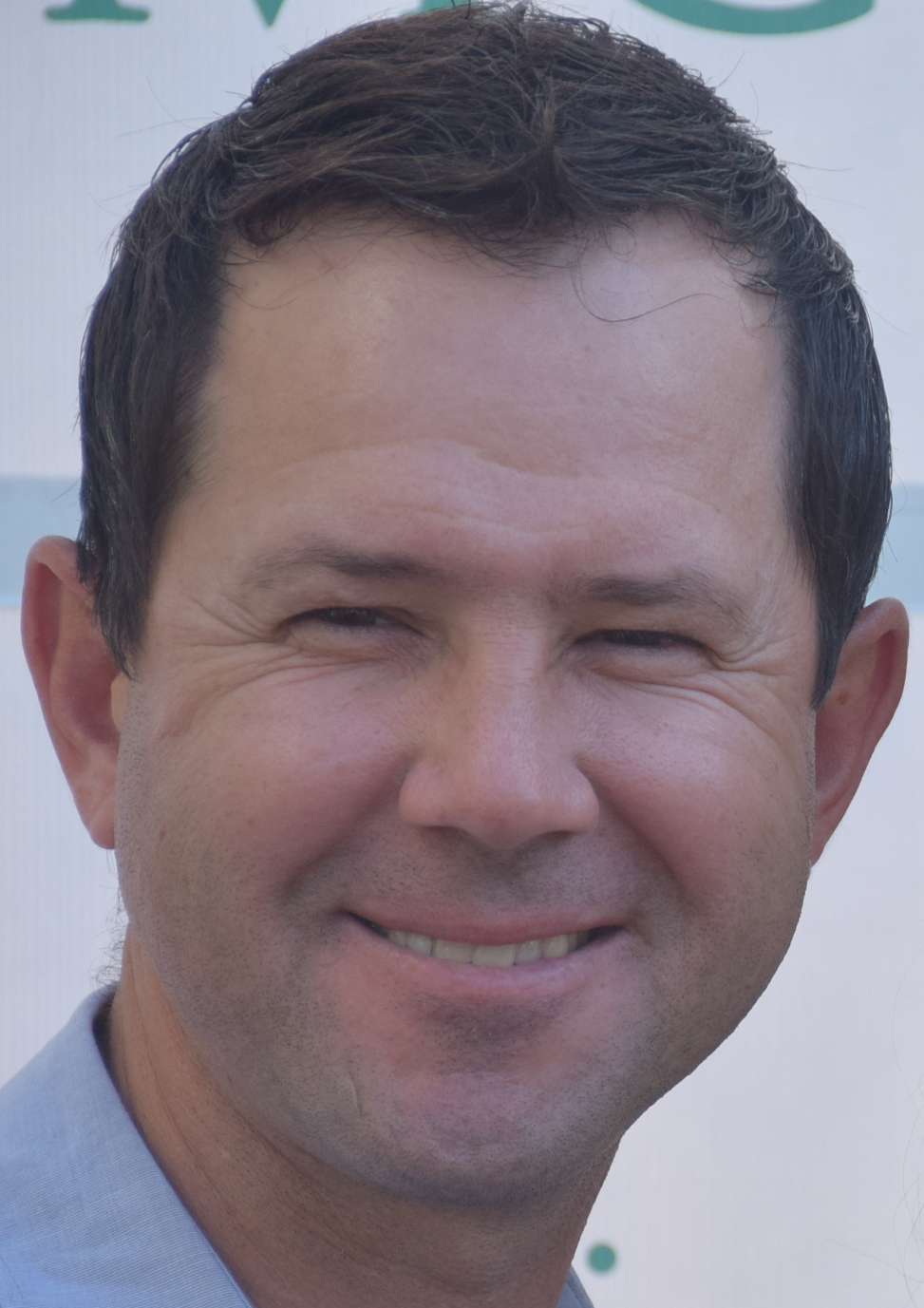
- 2006 Cricketer of the Year Ricky Ponting
- Date: 3 November 2006
- Presented by: ICC

Highlights
- Cricketer of the Year: (Australia) Ricky Ponting (1st award)
- Test Player of the Year: (Australia) Ricky Ponting (1st award)
- ODI Player of the Year: (Australia) Michael Hussey (1st award)
- Emerging Player of the Year: (England) Ian Bell
- Website: www.icc-cricket.com

The 2006 ICC Awards were held on 3 November 2006 in Mumbai, India. The annual awards had been instigated in London in 2004 and in 2005 they were announced in Sydney. They were sponsored by Hyundai and conducted during the 2006 ICC Champions Trophy. For the first time, honours for both Captain of the Year and Women's Cricketer of the Year were awarded.

== Selection Committee ==
Nominees were voted on by a 56-member academy of current and ex-players and officials from among players chosen by the ICC Selection Committee, chaired by ICC Cricket Hall of Famer Sunil Gavaskar.

Selection Committee members:

- (India) Sunil Gavaskar (chairman)
- (South Africa) Allan Donald
- (Australia) Ian Healy
- (Sri Lanka) Arjuna Ranatunga
- (Pakistan) Waqar Younis

== Winners and nominees ==
The winners and nominees of various individual awards were:

=== Cricketer of the Year ===
- Winner: Ricky Ponting (Aus)
- Nominees: Shane Warne (Aus), Muttiah Muralitharan (SL), Michael Hussey (Aus), Andrew Flintoff (Eng), Mohammad Yousuf (Pak), Rahul Dravid (Ind), Mahela Jayawardene (SL), Younis Khan (Pak), Monty Panesar (Eng), Brett Lee (Aus), Makhaya Ntini (SA), Adam Gilchrist (Aus)

=== Test Player of the Year ===
- Winner: Ricky Ponting (Aus)
- Nominees: Michael Hussey (Aus), Mohammad Yousuf (Pak), Andrew Flintoff (Eng), Shane Warne (Aus), Muttiah Muralitharan (SL), Rahul Dravid (Ind), Mahela Jayawardene (SL), Younis Khan (Pak), Matthew Hayden (Aus), Makhaya Ntini (SA), Kumar Sangakkara (SL), Kevin Pietersen (Eng)

=== ODI Player of the Year ===
- Winner: Michael Hussey (Aus)
- Nominees: Ricky Ponting (Aus), Andrew Flintoff (Eng), Mahela Jayawardene (SL), Kumar Sangakkara (SL), Rahul Dravid (Ind), Muttiah Muralitharan (SL), Kevin Pietersen (Eng), Mohammad Yousuf (Pak), Brett Lee (Aus), Herschelle Gibbs (SA), Shahid Afridi (Pak), Inzamam-ul-Haq (Pak), Adam Gilchrist (Aus), Yuvraj Singh (Ind), Shane Bond (NZ), Irfan Pathan (Ind)

=== Emerging Player of the Year ===
- Winner: Ian Bell (Eng)
- Nominees: Monty Panesar (Eng), Alastair Cook (Eng), Denesh Ramdin (WI), Malinga Bandara (SL), Mohammad Asif (Pak), Upul Tharanga (SL), Shahriar Nafees (Ban)

=== Umpire of the Year ===
- Winner: Simon Taufel (Aus)
- Nominees: Aleem Dar (Pak), Rudi Koertzen (SA)

=== Captain of the Year ===
- Winner: Mahela Jayawardene (SL)
- Nominees: Rahul Dravid (Ind), Ricky Ponting (Aus), Michael Vaughan (Eng)

=== Women's Cricketer of the Year ===
- Winner: Karen Rolton (Aus)
- Nominees: Cathryn Fitzpatrick (Aus), Anjum Chopra (Ind), Neetu David (Ind), Claire Taylor (Eng), Katherine Brunt (Eng), Emily Drumm (NZ)

=== Spirit of Cricket ===
- Winner: England

== ICC World XI Teams ==
=== ICC Test Team of the Year ===
Rahul Dravid was selected as the captain of the Test Team of the Year. In addition to a wicket-keeper, 9 other players and a 12th man were announced as follows:

- (Australia) Matthew Hayden
- (Australia) Michael Hussey
- (Australia) Ricky Ponting
- (India) Rahul Dravid
- (Pakistan) Mohammad Yousuf
- (Sri Lanka) Kumar Sangakkara (wicket-keeper)
- (England) Andrew Flintoff
- (Australia) Shane Warne
- (South Africa) Makhaya Ntini
- (Sri Lanka) Muttiah Muralitharan
- (Australia) Glenn McGrath
- (Australia) Brett Lee (12th man)

=== ICC ODI Team of the Year ===
Mahela Jayawardene was selected as the captain of the ODI Team of the Year. In addition to a wicket-keeper, 9 other players and a 12th man were announced as follows:

- (Australia) Adam Gilchrist (wicket-keeper)
- (India) MS Dhoni
- (Australia) Ricky Ponting
- (Sri Lanka) Mahela Jayawardene
- (India) Yuvraj Singh
- (Australia) Michael Hussey
- (England) Andrew Flintoff
- (India) Irfan Pathan
- (Australia) Brett Lee
- (New Zealand) Shane Bond
- (Sri Lanka) Muttiah Muralitharan
- (Australia) Andrew Symonds (12th man)

== Short lists ==
=== Cricketer of the Year ===
- (Australia) Michael Hussey
- (Sri Lanka) Muttiah Muralitharan
- (Australia) Ricky Ponting
- (Pakistan) Mohammad Yousuf

=== Test Player of the Year ===
- (Sri Lanka) Muttiah Muralitharan
- (Australia) Ricky Ponting
- (Australia) Shane Warne
- (Pakistan) Mohammad Yousuf

=== ODI Player of the Year ===
- (Australia) Michael Hussey
- (Sri Lanka) Mahela Jayawardene
- (Australia) Ricky Ponting
- (India) Yuvraj Singh

=== Emerging Player of the Year ===
- (England) Alastair Cook
- (Pakistan) Mohammad Asif
- (England) Ian Bell
- (England) Monty Panesar

=== Women's Cricketer of the Year ===
- (Australia) Karen Rolton
- (India) Anjum Chopra
- (England) Katherine Brunt

=== Spirit of Cricket ===
- India
- England
- New Zealand
- Sri Lanka

== See also ==
- International Cricket Council
- ICC Awards
- Sir Garfield Sobers Trophy (Cricketer of the Year)
- ICC Test Player of the Year
- ICC ODI Player of the Year
- David Shepherd Trophy (Umpire of the Year)
- ICC Women's Cricketer of the Year
- ICC Test Team of the Year
- ICC ODI Team of the Year
