= 2023 ICC Awards =

International cricket award

- Date: 22–25 January 2024
- Presented by: International Cricket Council

Highlights
- Cricketer of the Year: Men's: (Australia) Pat Cummins; Women's: (England) Nat Sciver-Brunt
- Men's Test Cricketer of the Year: (Australia) Usman Khawaja
- ODI Cricketer of the Year: Men's: (India) Virat Kohli; Women's: (Sri Lanka) Chamari Athapaththu
- T20I Cricketer of the Year: Men's: (India) Suryakumar Yadav; Women's: (Cricket West Indies) Hayley Matthews
- Emerging Cricketer of the Year: Men's: (New Zealand) Rachin Ravindra; Women's: (Australia) Phoebe Litchfield
- Website: www.icc-cricket.com

The 2023 ICC Awards were the nineteenth edition of ICC Awards. The nominations took into account players' performance between 1 January 2023 and 31 December 2023.

== Winners and nominees ==
The shortlists of the nominations for individual award categories were announced from 3 to 5 January 2024.

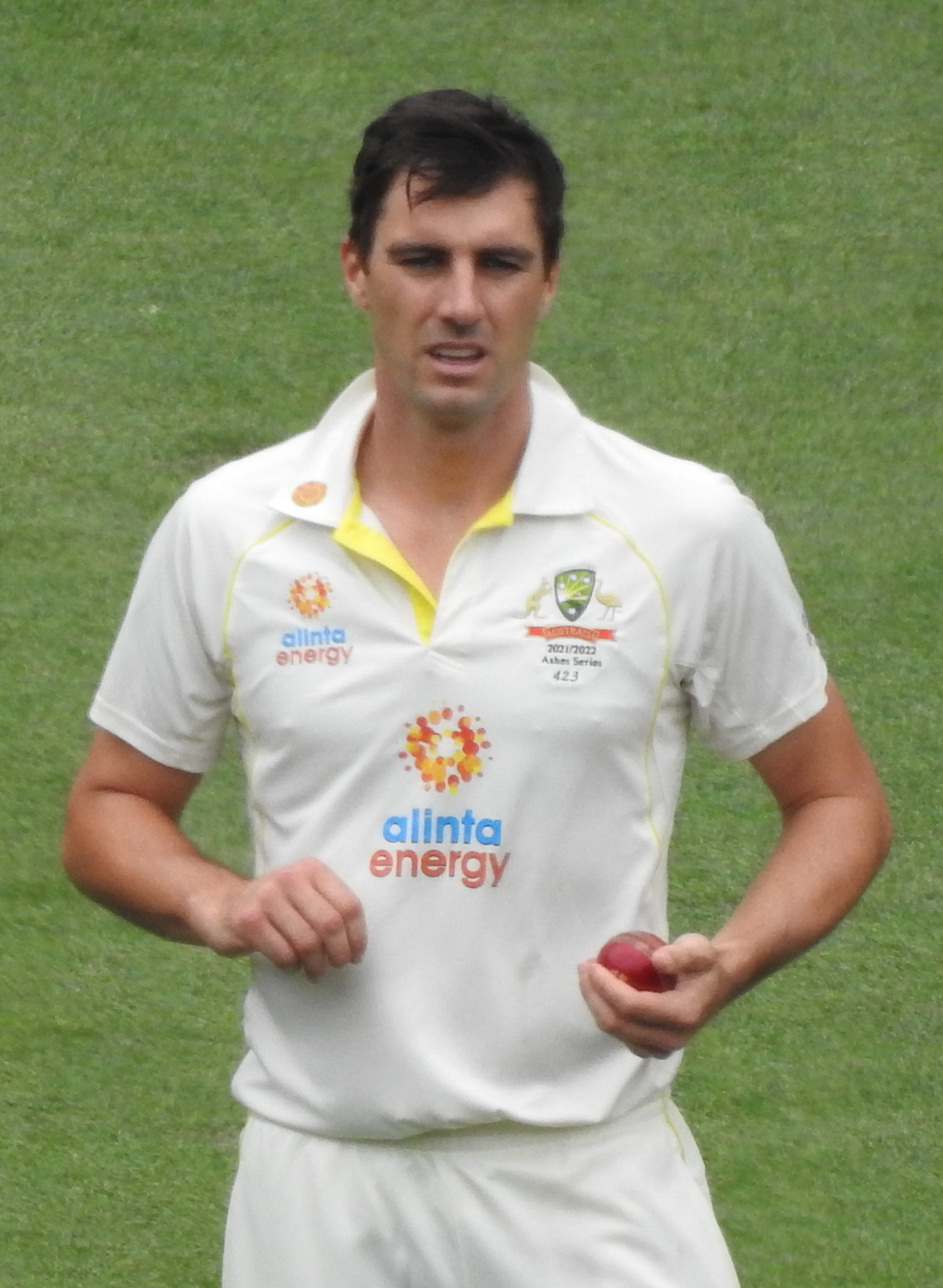
Pat Cummins

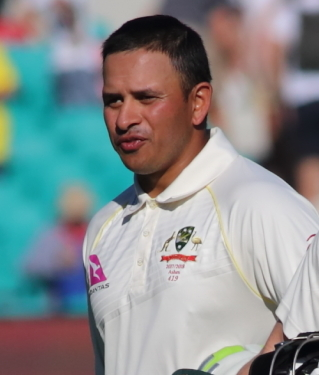
Usman Khawaja

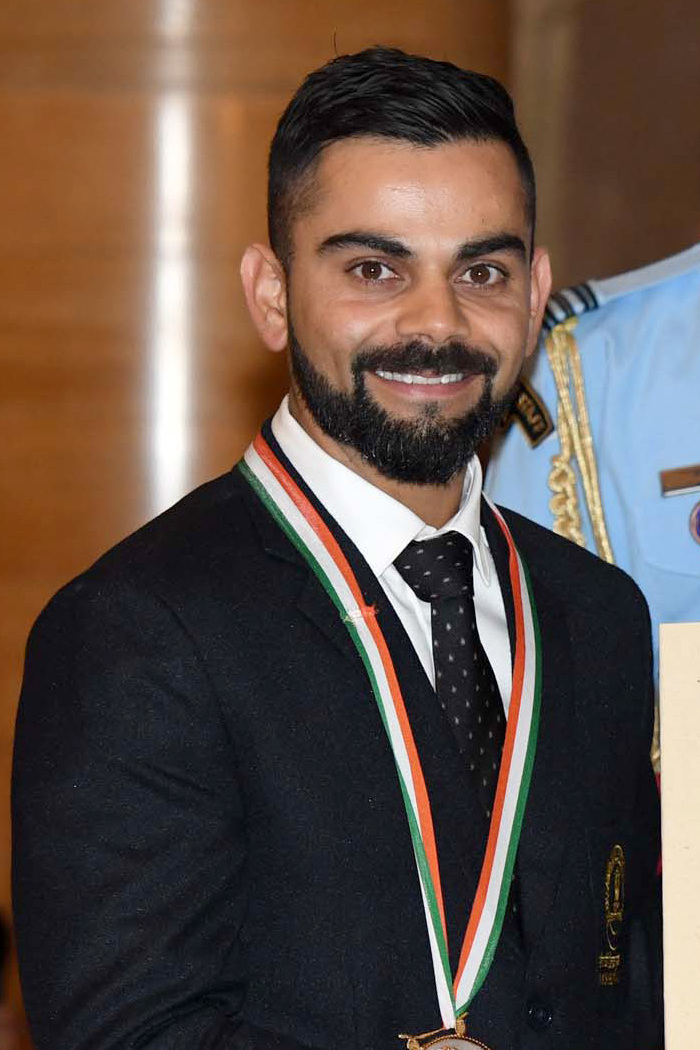
Virat Kohli

=== Men's awards ===
Men's Cricketer of the Year: (Australia) Pat Cummins; (Australia) Travis Head; (India) Virat Kohli; (India) Ravindra Jadeja	Men's Test Cricketer of the Year: (Australia) Usman Khawaja; (Australia) Travis Head; (India) Ravichandran Ashwin; (England) Joe Root
Men's ODI Cricketer of the Year: (India) Virat Kohli; (India) Shubman Gill; (India) Mohammad Shami; (New Zealand) Daryl Mitchell	Men's T20I Cricketer of the Year: (India) Suryakumar Yadav; (Zimbabwe) Sikandar Raza; (Uganda) Alpesh Ramjani; (New Zealand) Mark Chapman
Men's Emerging Cricketer of the Year: (New Zealand) Rachin Ravindra; (South Africa) Gerald Coetzee; (Sri Lanka) Dilshan Madushanka; (India) Yashasvi Jaiswal	Men's Associate Cricketer of the Year: (Netherlands) Bas de Leede

=== Women's awards ===
Women's Cricketer of the Year: (England) Nat Sciver-Brunt; (Sri Lanka) Chamari Athapaththu; (Australia) Ashleigh Gardner; (Australia) Beth Mooney	Women's ODI Cricketer of the Year: (Sri Lanka) Chamari Athapaththu; (England) Nat Sciver; (Australia) Ashleigh Gardner; (New Zealand) Amelia Kerr
Women's T20I Cricketer of the Year: (Cricket West Indies) Hayley Matthews; (Australia) Ellyse Perry; (England) Sophie Ecclestone	Women's Emerging Cricketer of the Year: (Australia) Phoebe Litchfield; (Bangladesh) Marufa Akter; (England) Lauren Bell; (Scotland) Darcey Karter
Women's Associate Cricketer of the Year: (Kenya) Queentor Abel

=== Other awards ===
Umpire of the Year
- (England) Richard Illingworth
Spirit of Cricket
- Zimbabwe

=== ICC Teams of the Year ===
==== Men's teams ====
ICC Men's Test Team of the Year

ICC Men's Test Team of the Year
Batting position	Player	Team	Role
Opener	Usman Khawaja	Australia	Batsman
Opener	Dimuth Karunaratne	Sri Lanka	Batsman
Number 3	Kane Williamson	New Zealand	Batsman
Number 4	Joe Root	England	Batsman
Number 5	Travis Head	Australia	Batsman
Number 6	Ravindra Jadeja	India	All-rounder
Number 7	Alex Carey	Australia	Batsman / Wicket-keeper
Number 8	Pat Cummins	Australia	Bowler / Captain
Number 9	Ravichandran Ashwin	India	All-rounder
Number 10	Mitchell Starc	Australia	Bowler
Number 11	Stuart Broad	England	Bowler

ICC Men's ODI Team of the Year

ICC Men's ODI Team of the Year
Batting position	Player	Team	Role
Opener	Rohit Sharma	India	Batsman / Captain
Opener	Shubman Gill	India	Batsman
Number 3	Travis Head	Australia	Batsman
Number 4	Virat Kohli	India	Batsman
Number 5	Daryl Mitchell	New Zealand	All-rounder
Number 6	Heinrich Klaasen	South Africa	Batsman / Wicket-keeper
Number 7	Marco Jansen	South Africa	All-rounder
Number 8	Adam Zampa	Australia	Bowler
Number 9	Mohammed Siraj	India	Bowler
Number 10	Kuldeep Yadav	India	Bowler
Number 11	Mohammed Shami	India	Bowler

ICC Men's T20I Team of the Year

ICC Men's T20I Team of the Year
Batting position	Player	Team	Role
Opener	Yashaswi Jaiswal	India	Batsman
Opener	Phil Salt	England	Batsman
Number 3	Nicholas Pooran	West Indies	Batsman / Wicket-keeper
Number 4	Suryakumar Yadav	India	Batsman / Captain
Number 5	Mark Chapman	New Zealand	Batsman
Number 6	Sikandar Raza	Zimbabwe	All-rounder
Number 7	Alpesh Ramjani	Uganda	All-rounder
Number 8	Mark Adair	Ireland	All-rounder
Number 9	Ravi Bishnoi	India	All-rounder
Number 10	Richard Ngarava	Zimbabwe	Bowler
Number 11	Arshdeep Singh	India	Bowler

==== Women's teams ====
ICC Women's ODI Team of the Year

ICC Women's ODI Team of the Year
Batting position	Player	Team	Role
Opener	Phoebe Litchfield	Australia	Batter
Opener	Chamari Athapaththu	Sri Lanka	Batter / Captain
Number 3	Ellyse Perry	Australia	ALL-rounder
Number 4	Amelia Kerr	New Zealand	All-rounder
Number 5	Beth Mooney	Australia	Batter / Wicket-keeper
Number 6	Nat Sciver-Brunt	England	All-rounder
Number 7	Ashleigh Gardner	Australia	All-rounder
Number 8	Annabel Sutherland	Australia	All-rounder
Number 9	Nadine de Klerk	South Africa	All-rounder
Number 10	Lea Tahuhu	New Zealand	Bowler
Number 11	Nahida Akter	Bangladesh	Bowler

ICC Women's T20I Team of the Year

ICC Women's T20I Team of the Year
Batting position	Player	Team	Role
Opener	Chamari Athapaththu	Sri Lanka	Batter / Captain
Opener	Beth Mooney	Australia	Batter / Wicket-keeper
Number 3	Laura Wolvaardt	South Africa	Batter
Number 4	Hayley Matthews	West Indies	All-rounder
Number 5	Nat Sciver-Brunt	England	All-rounder
Number 6	Amelia Kerr	New Zealand	All-rounder
Number 7	Ellyse Perry	Australia	All-rounder
Number 8	Ashleigh Gardner	Australia	All-rounder
Number 9	Deepti Sharma	India	All-rounder
Number 10	Sophie Ecclestone	England	Bowler
Number 11	Megan Schutt	Australia	Bowler
