= 2021 ICC Awards =

International cricket award

- Date: 23–24 January 2022
- Presented by: International Cricket Council

Highlights
- Cricketer of the Year: Men's: (Pakistan) Shaheen Afridi; Women's: (India) Smriti Mandhana
- Men's Test Cricketer of the Year: (England) Joe Root
- ODI Cricketer of the Year: Men's: (Pakistan) Babar Azam; Women's: (South Africa) Lizelle Lee
- T20I Cricketer of the Year: Men's: (Pakistan) Mohammad Rizwan; Women's: (England) Tammy Beaumont
- Emerging Cricketer of the Year: Men's: (South Africa) Janneman Malan; Women's: (Pakistan) Fatima Sana
- Website: www.icc-cricket.com

The 2021 ICC Awards were the seventeenth edition of ICC Awards. The nominations took into account players' performance between 1 January 2021 and 31 December 2021. The announcement of the ICC World XI Teams were made on 19 and 20 January 2022. The women's awards were announced on 23 January 2022. The winners of the men's individual ICC awards and ICC Umpire of the year award were announced on 24 January 2022, with the Spirit of cricket award was announced on 2 February 2022.

== Winners and nominees ==
The shortlists of the nominations for individual award categories were announced from 28 to 31 December 2021.

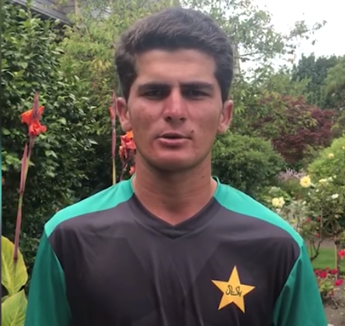
Shaheen Afridi

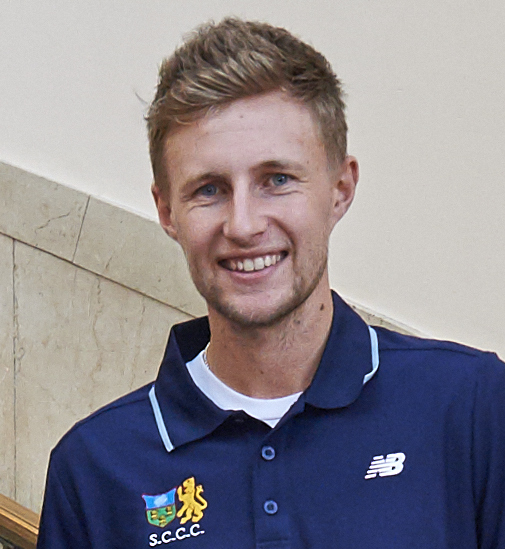
Joe Root

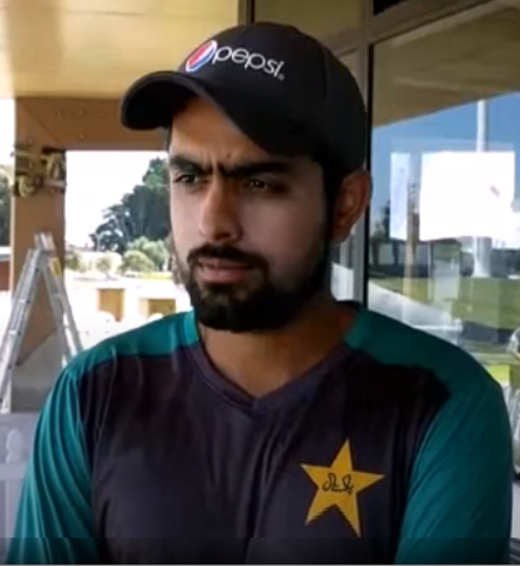
Babar Azam

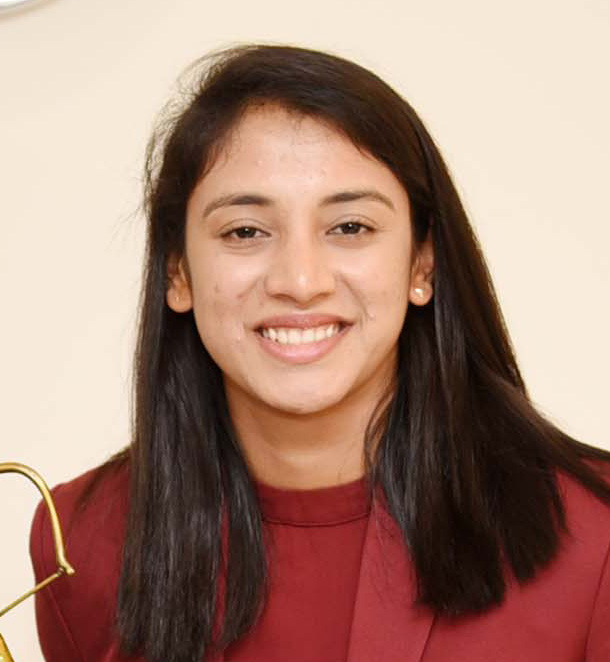
Smriti Mandhana

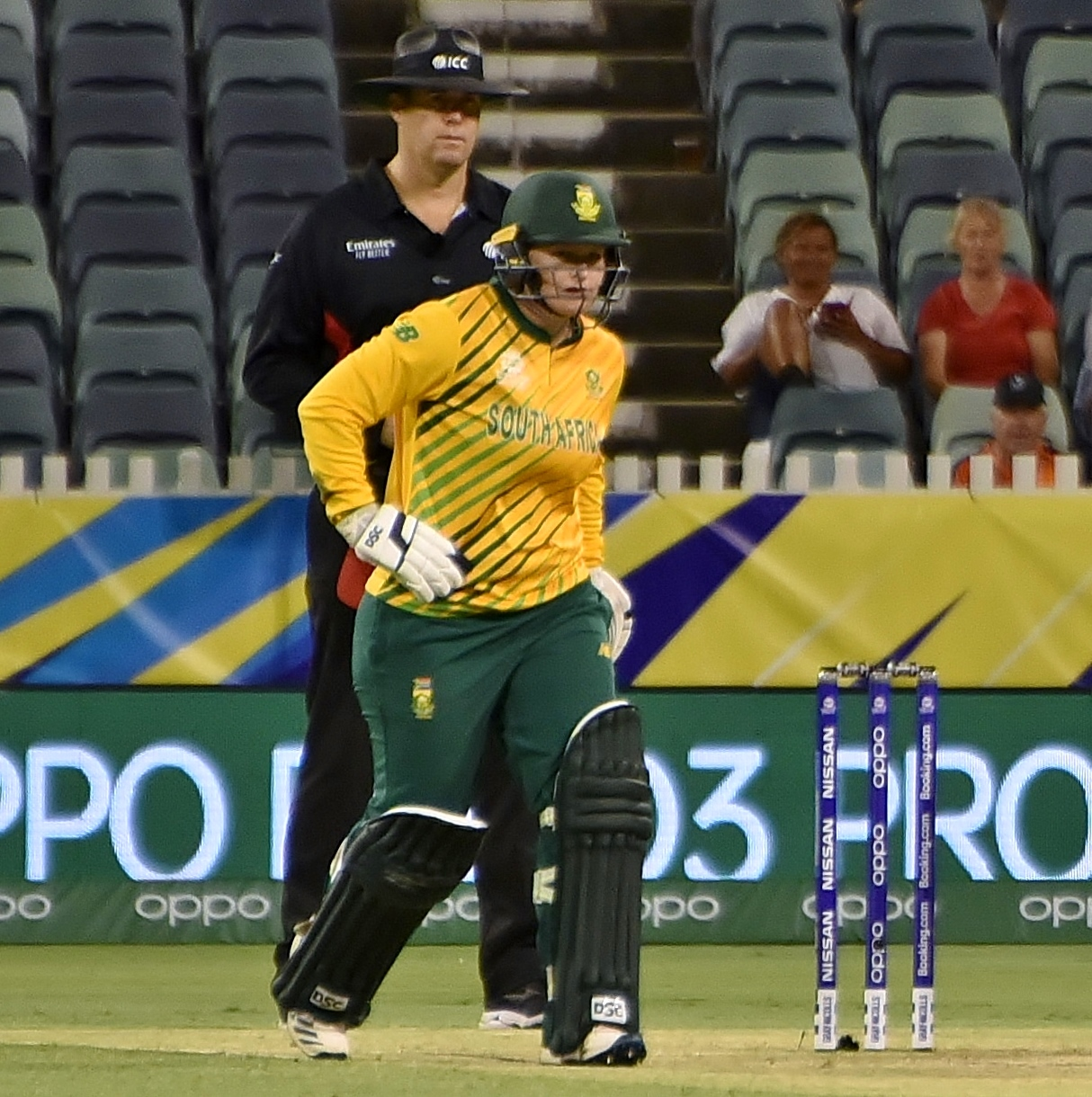
Lizelle Lee

=== Individual awards ===
==== Men's awards ====
Men's Cricketer of the Year: (Pakistan) Shaheen Afridi; (England) Joe Root; (Pakistan) Mohammad Rizwan; (New Zealand) Kane Williamson	Men's Test Cricketer of the Year: (England) Joe Root; (India) Ravichandran Ashwin; (New Zealand) Kyle Jamieson; (Sri Lanka) Dimuth Karunaratne
Men's ODI Cricketer of the Year: (Pakistan) Babar Azam; (Bangladesh) Shakib Al Hasan; (South Africa) Janneman Malan; (Ireland) Paul Stirling	Men's T20I Cricketer of the Year: (Pakistan) Mohammad Rizwan; (England) Jos Buttler; (Sri Lanka) Wanindu Hasaranga; (Australia) Mitchell Marsh
Men's Emerging Cricketer of the Year: (South Africa) Janneman Malan	Men's Associate Cricketer of the Year: (Oman) Zeeshan Maqsood

==== Women's awards ====
Women's Cricketer of the Year: (India) Smriti Mandhana; (England) Tammy Beaumont; (South Africa) Lizelle Lee; (Ireland) Gaby Lewis	Women's ODI Cricketer of the Year: (South Africa) Lizelle Lee; (England) Tammy Beaumont; (Cricket West Indies) Hayley Matthews; (Pakistan) Fatima Sana
Women's T20I Cricketer of the Year: (England) Tammy Beaumont; (Ireland) Gaby Lewis; (India) Smriti Mandhana; (England) Nat Sciver	Women's Emerging Cricketer of the Year: (Pakistan) Fatima Sana
Women's Associate Cricketer of the Year: (Austria) Andrea-Mae Zepeda

==== Other awards ====
Umpire of the Year
- (South Africa) Marais Erasmus
Spirit of Cricket
- (New Zealand) Daryl Mitchell

=== ICC Teams of the Year ===
==== Men's teams ====
ICC Men's Test Team of the Year

ICC Men's Test Team of the Year
Batting position	Player	Team	Role
Opener	Dimuth Karunaratne	Sri Lanka	Batsman
Opener	Rohit Sharma	India	Batsman
Number 3	Marnus Labuschagne	Australia	Batsman
Number 4	Joe Root	England	Batsman
Number 5	Kane Williamson	New Zealand	Batsman / Captain
Number 6	Fawad Alam	Pakistan	Batsman
Number 7	Rishabh Pant	India	Batsman / Wicket-keeper
Number 8	Kyle Jamieson	New Zealand	Bowler
Number 9	Ravichandran Ashwin	India	All-rounder
Number 10	Hasan Ali	Pakistan	Bowler
Number 11	Shaheen Afridi	Pakistan	Bowler

ICC Men's ODI Team of the Year

ICC Men's ODI Team of the Year
Batting position	Player	Team	Role
Opener	Paul Stirling	Ireland	Batsman
Opener	Janneman Malan	South Africa	Batsman
Number 3	Babar Azam	Pakistan	Batsman / Captain
Number 4	Fakhar Zaman	Pakistan	Batsman
Number 5	Rassie van der Dussen	South Africa	Batsman
Number 6	Shakib Al Hasan	Bangladesh	All-rounder
Number 7	Mushfiqur Rahim	Bangladesh	Batsman / Wicket-keeper
Number 8	Wanindu Hasaranga	Sri Lanka	All-rounder
Number 9	Mustafizur Rahman	Bangladesh	Bowler
Number 10	Simi Singh	Ireland	Bowler
Number 11	Dushmantha Chameera	Sri Lanka	Bowler

ICC Men's t20i Team of the Year

ICC Men's T20I Team of the Year
Batting position	Player	Team	Role
Opener	Jos Buttler	England	Batsman
Opener	Mohammad Rizwan	Pakistan	Batsman / Wicket-keeper
Number 3	Babar Azam	Pakistan	Batsman / Captain
Number 4	Aiden Markram	South Africa	Batsman
Number 5	Mitchell Marsh	Australia	All-rounder
Number 6	David Miller	South Africa	Batsman
Number 7	Tabraiz Shamsi	South Africa	Bowler
Number 8	Josh Hazlewood	Australia	Bowler
Number 9	Wanindu Hasaranga	Sri Lanka	All-rounder
Number 10	Mustafizur Rahman	Bangladesh	Bowler
Number 11	Shaheen Afridi	Pakistan	Bowler

==== Women's teams ====
ICC Women's ODI Team of the Year

ICC Women's ODI Team of the Year
Batting position	Player	Team	Role
Opener	Lizelle Lee	South Africa	Batsman
Opener	Alyssa Healy	Australia	Batsman / Wicket-keeper
Number 3	Tammy Beaumont	England	Batsman
Number 4	Mithali Raj	India	Batsman
Number 5	Heather Knight	England	Batsman / Captain
Number 6	Hayley Matthews	West Indies	All-rounder
Number 7	Marizanne Kapp	South Africa	All-rounder
Number 8	Shabnim Ismail	South Africa	Bowler
Number 9	Fatima Sana	Pakistan	Bowler
Number 10	Jhulan Goswami	India	Bowler
Number 11	Anisa Mohammed	West Indies	Bowler

ICC Women's T20I Team of the Year

ICC Women's T20I Team of the Year
Batting position	Player	Team	Role
Opener	Smriti Mandhana	India	Batsman
Opener	Tammy Beaumont	England	Batsman
Number 3	Danielle Wyatt	England	Batsman
Number 4	Gaby Lewis	Ireland	Batsman
Number 5	Natalie Sciver	England	All-rounder / Captain
Number 6	Amy Jones	England	Batsman / Wicket-keeper
Number 7	Laura Wolvaardt	South Africa	Batsman
Number 8	Marizanne Kapp	South Africa	All-rounder
Number 9	Sophie Ecclestone	England	Bowler
Number 10	Loryn Phiri	Zimbabwe	Bowler
Number 11	Shabnim Ismail	South Africa	Bowler

== Selection Committee ==
The nominees were shortlisted by the Awards panel, comprising prominent cricket journalists and broadcasters from across the globe along with Geoff Allardice, the ICC's CEO. The Voting Academy, comprising a wider selection of global cricket journalists and broadcasters, voted for their first, second and third choices for each category. The ICC also took into consideration fans’ votes via ICC's digital channels. The result of the Voting Academy selections and the fans’ vote were combined to determine the winner in each of the first seven categories.
