= David Shepherd Trophy =

ICC Umpire of the Year

ICC Award for Umpire of the Year
- Presented by: International Cricket Council
- First award: 2004
- Final award: 2024
- Currently held by: (England) Richard Illingworth (4th award)

Highlights
- Most awards: (Australia) Simon Taufel (5 awards)
- Website: ICC Awards

The David Shepherd Trophy is awarded annually by the International Cricket Council to the ICC Umpire of the Year. The Trophy is named after famous and respected English umpire David Shepherd. The first David Shepherd Trophy was awarded to Simon Taufel in 2004.

== Trophy ==
The trophy, produced by Swarovski, features a crystal cricket ball studded with over 4200 Swarovski crystal chantons, cusped in a hand which extends from an aluminium base. The hand represents the theme of "breaking through" in pursuit of excellence. The trophy features a clear crystal ball, weighs 1.2 kg, is 30 cm high and 11 cm in width.

== Winners ==
Year	Winner	Ref
2004	(Australia) Simon Taufel	
2005	(Australia) Simon Taufel	
2006	(Australia) Simon Taufel	
2007	(Australia) Simon Taufel	
2008	(Australia) Simon Taufel	
2009	(Pakistan) Aleem Dar	
2010	(Pakistan) Aleem Dar	
2011	(Pakistan) Aleem Dar	
2012	(Sri Lanka) Kumar Dharmasena	
2013	(England) Richard Kettleborough	
2014	(England) Richard Kettleborough	
2015	(England) Richard Kettleborough	
2016	(South Africa) Marais Erasmus	
2017	(South Africa) Marais Erasmus	
2018	(Sri Lanka) Kumar Dharmasena	
2019	(England) Richard Illingworth	
2021	(South Africa) Marais Erasmus	
2022	(England) Richard Illingworth	
2023	(England) Richard Illingworth	
2024	(England) Richard Illingworth	

=== Wins by umpire ===
Umpire	Winner
(Australia) Simon Taufel	5 (2004, 2005, 2006, 2007, 2008)
(England) Richard Illingworth	4 (2019, 2022, 2023, 2024)
(Pakistan) Aleem Dar	3 (2009, 2010, 2011)
(England) Richard Kettleborough	3 (2013, 2014, 2015)
(South Africa) Marais Erasmus	3 (2016, 2017, 2021)
(Sri Lanka) Kumar Dharmasena	2 (2012, 2018)

=== Wins by country ===
Country	Umpires	Total
England	2	7
Australia	1	5
Pakistan	1	3
South Africa	1	3
Sri Lanka	1	2
