= 2016 ICC Awards =

Cricket award

- Date: 21 December 2016
- Presented by: ICC

Highlights
- Men's Cricketer of the Year: (India) Ravichandran Ashwin
- Men's Test Player of the Year: (India) Ravichandran Ashwin
- ODI Player of the Year: Men's: (South Africa) Quinton de Kock; Women's: (New Zealand) Suzie Bates
- Women's T20I Player of the Year: (New Zealand) Suzie Bates
- Men's Emerging Player of the Year: (Bangladesh) Mustafizur Rahman
- Website: www.icc-cricket.com

The 2016 ICC Awards were the thirteenth edition of ICC Awards. The voting panel took into account players' performance between 14 September 2015 and 20 September 2016. The announcement of the ICC Test Team of the Year and ICC ODI Team of the Year, along with the winners of the men's individual ICC awards, was made on 21 December 2016. The ICC awards the Sir Garfield Sobers Trophy to the Cricketer of the Year, which is considered to be the most prestigious award in world cricket.

== Award categories and winners ==
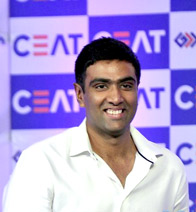
Ravichandran Ashwin

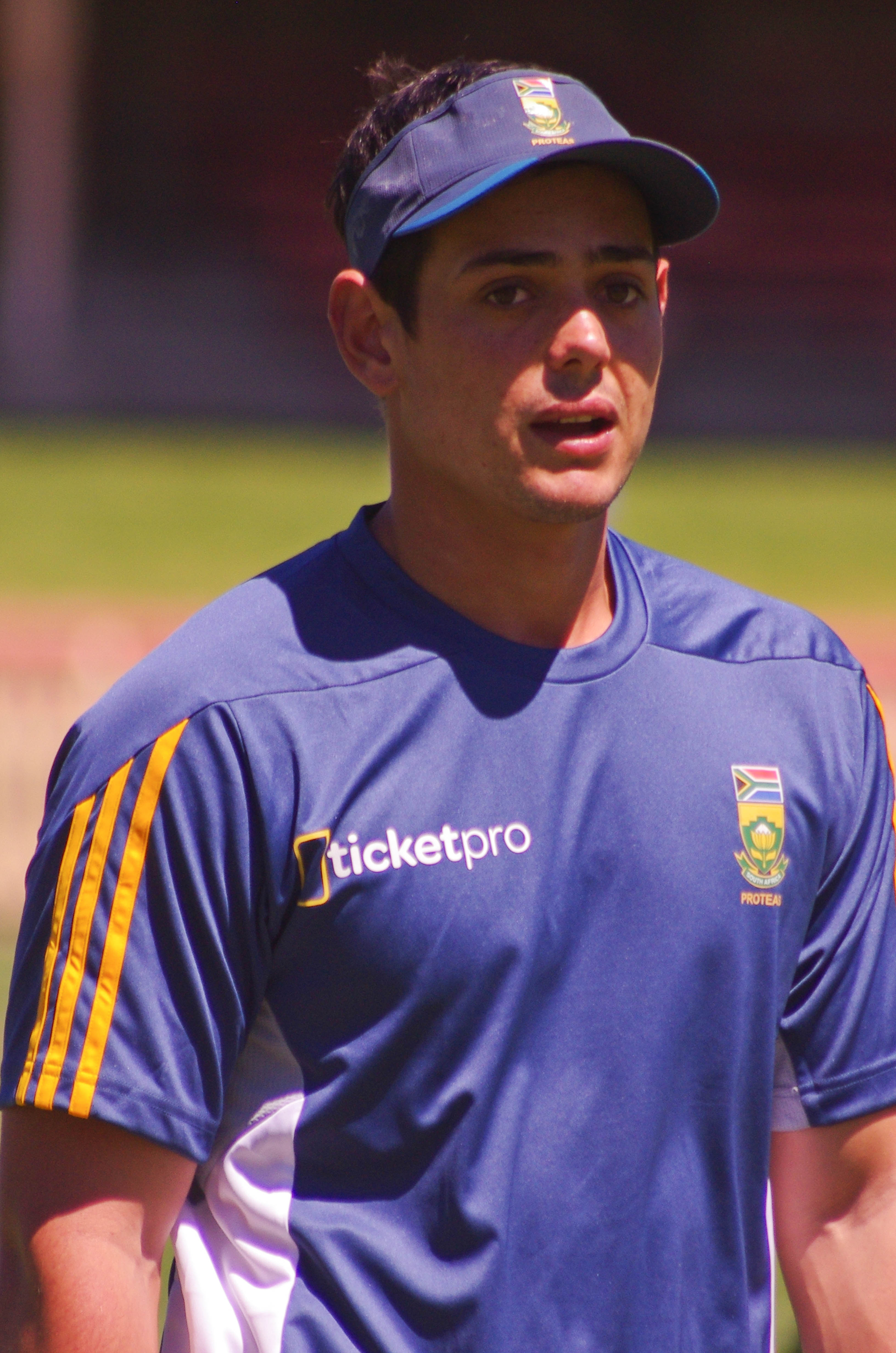
Quinton de Kock

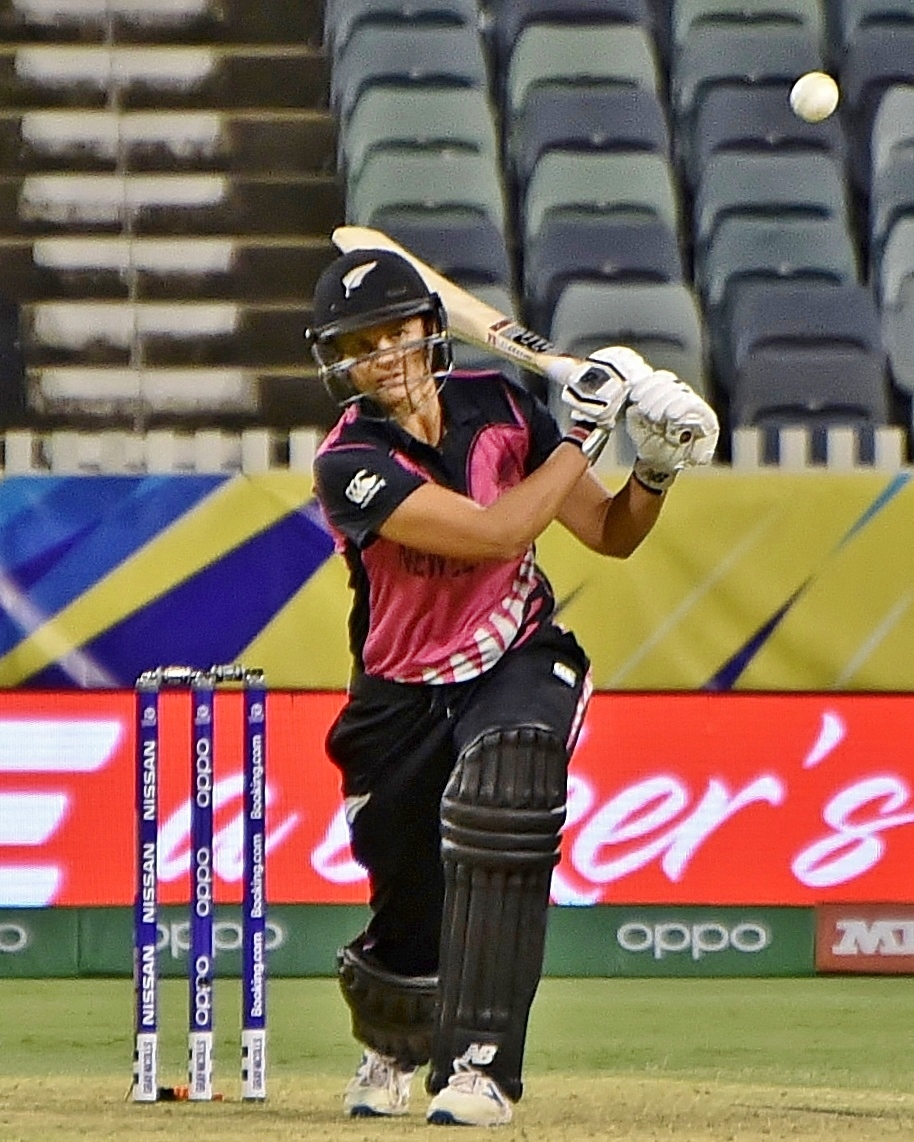
Suzie Bates

=== Individual awards ===
==== Men's awards ====
Men's Cricketer of the Year: (India) Ravichandran Ashwin	Men's Test Player of the Year: (India) Ravichandran Ashwin
Men's ODI Player of the Year: (South Africa) Quinton de Kock	Men's Emerging Player of the Year: (Bangladesh) Mustafizur Rahman
Men's Associate Player of the Year: (Afghanistan) Mohammad Shahzad

==== Women's awards ====
Women's ODI Player of the Year
- (New Zealand) Suzie Bates
Women's T20I Player of the Year
- (New Zealand) Suzie Bates

==== Other awards ====
Umpire of the Year
- (South Africa) Marais Erasmus
Twenty20 International Performance of the Year
- (Cricket West Indies) Carlos Brathwaite, for scoring 34 not out off 10 deliveries against England in the 2016 ICC World Twenty20 Final at the Eden Gardens on 3 April 2016
Spirit of Cricket
- Misbah-ul-Haq, for inspiring his side to play the game in its true spirit and captaining Pakistan to number one in the ICC Test Championship

=== ICC Teams of the Year ===
==== Men's teams ====
ICC Men's Test Team of the Year

Alastair Cook was selected as the captain of the Test Team of the Year, with Jonny Bairstow selected as the wicket-keeper. Other players are:

- (Australia) David Warner
- (England) Alastair Cook
- (New Zealand) Kane Williamson
- (England) Joe Root
- (Australia) Adam Voges
- (England) Jonny Bairstow
- (England) Ben Stokes
- (India) Ravichandran Ashwin
- (Sri Lanka) Rangana Herath
- (Australia) Mitchell Starc
- (South Africa) Dale Steyn
- (Australia) Steve Smith (12th man)

ICC Men's ODI Team of the Year

Virat Kohli was selected as the captain of the ODI Team of the Year, with Quinton de Kock selected as the wicket-keeper. Other players are:

- (Australia) David Warner
- (South Africa) Quinton de Kock
- (India) Rohit Sharma
- (India) Virat Kohli
- (South Africa) AB de Villiers
- (England) Jos Buttler
- (Australia) Mitchell Marsh
- (India) Ravindra Jadeja
- (Australia) Mitchell Starc
- (South Africa) Kagiso Rabada
- (Cricket West Indies) Sunil Narine
- (South Africa) Imran Tahir (12th man)

==== Women's teams ====
ICC Women’s Team of the Year

Stafanie Taylor was selected as the captain of the Women's Team of the Year, with Rachel Priest selected as the wicket-keeper. Other players are:

- (New Zealand) Suzie Bates
- (New Zealand) Rachel Priest
- (India) Smriti Mandhana
- (Cricket West Indies) Stafanie Taylor
- (Australia) Meg Lanning
- (Australia) Ellyse Perry
- (England) Heather Knight
- (Cricket West Indies) Deandra Dottin
- (South Africa) Sune Luus
- (England) Anya Shrubsole
- (New Zealand) Leigh Kasperek
- (Ireland) Kim Garth (12th woman)

== See also ==
- International Cricket Council
- ICC Awards
- Sir Garfield Sobers Trophy (Cricketer of the Year)
- ICC Test Player of the Year
- ICC ODI Player of the Year
- David Shepherd Trophy (Umpire of the Year)
- ICC Women's Cricketer of the Year
- ICC Test Team of the Year
- ICC ODI Team of the Year
