= ICC Women's T20I Team of the Year =

International cricket annual award

The ICC Women's T20I Team of the Year is an honour awarded each year by the International Cricket Council. It recognizes the top women's cricket players from around the world in the T20I format of the game. The team does not actually compete, but exists solely as an honorary entity.

== List ==
=== Winners ===
Players marked bold won the ICC Women's T20I Cricketer of the Year in that respective year:

Year	No. 1	No. 2	No. 3	No. 4	No. 5	No. 6	No. 7	No. 8	No. 9	No. 10	No. 11
2017	(England) Danielle Wyatt	(Australia) Beth Mooney (wk)	(India) Harmanpreet Kaur	(New Zealand) Sophie Devine	(Cricket West Indies) Stafanie Taylor (c)	(Cricket West Indies) Deandra Dottin	(Cricket West Indies) Hayley Matthews	(Australia) Megan Schutt	(Australia) Amanda-Jade Wellington	(New Zealand) Lea Tahuhu	(India) Ekta Bisht
2018	(India) Smriti Mandhana	(Australia) Alyssa Healy (wk)	(New Zealand) Suzie Bates	(India) Harmanpreet Kaur (c)	(England) Natalie Sciver	(Australia) Ellyse Perry	(Australia) Ashleigh Gardner	(New Zealand) Leigh Kasperek	(Australia) Megan Schutt	(Bangladesh) Rumana Ahmed	(India) Poonam Yadav
2019	(Australia) Alyssa Healy (wk)	(England) Danielle Wyatt	(India) Smriti Mandhana	(Australia) Meg Lanning (c)	(South Africa) Lizelle Lee	(Australia) Ellyse Perry	(India) Deepti Sharma	(Pakistan) Nida Dar	(South Africa) Shabnim Ismail	(Australia) Megan Schutt	(India) Radha Yadav
2021	(India) Smriti Mandhana	(England) Tammy Beaumont	(England) Danielle Wyatt	(Ireland) Gaby Lewis	(England) Natalie Sciver (c)	(England) Amy Jones(wk)	(South Africa) Laura Wolvaardt	(South Africa) Marizanne Kapp	(England) Sophie Ecclestone	(Zimbabwe) Loryn Phiri	(South Africa) Shabnim Ismail
2022	(India) Smriti Mandhana	(Australia) Beth Mooney	(New Zealand) Sophie Devine (c)	(Australia) Ashleigh Gardner	(Australia) Tahila McGrath	(Pakistan) Nida Dar	(India) Deepti Sharma	(India) Richa Ghosh (wk)	(England) Sophie Ecclestone	(Sri Lanka) Inoka Ranaweera	(India) Renuka Singh
2023	(Sri Lanka) Chamari Athapaththu (c)	(Australia) Beth Mooney (wk)	(South Africa) Laura Wolvaardt	(Cricket West Indies) Hayley Matthews	(England) Natalie Sciver	(New Zealand) Amelia Kerr	(Australia) Ellyse Perry	(Australia) Ashleigh Gardner	(India) Deepti Sharma	(England) Sophie Ecclestone	(Australia) Megan Schutt
2024	(South Africa) Laura Wolvaardt (c)	(India) Smriti Mandhana	(Sri Lanka) Chamari Athapaththu	(Cricket West Indies) Hayley Matthews	(England) Nat Sciver-Brunt	(New Zealand) Amelia Kerr	(India) Richa Ghosh (wk)	(South Africa) Marizanne Kapp	(Ireland) Orla Prendergast	(India) Deepti Sharma	(Pakistan) Sadia Iqbal

== Superlatives ==
=== Appearances by player ===
Players marked bold are still active in T20I matches and years marked bold indicate they won the ICC Women's T20I Cricketer of the Year in that respective year:

Player	Team	Appearances	Years
Smriti Mandhana	India	5	2018, 2019, 2021, 2022, 2024
Megan Schutt	Australia	4	2017, 2018, 2019, 2023
Nat Sciver-Brunt	England	4	2018, 2021, 2023, 2024
Deepti Sharma	India	4	2019, 2022, 2023, 2024
Danni Wyatt-Hodge	England	3	2017, 2019, 2021
Beth Mooney	Australia	3	**2017**, 2022, 2023
Ellyse Perry	Australia	3	2018, 2019, 2023
Ashleigh Gardner	Australia	3	2018, 2022, 2023
Sophie Ecclestone	England	3	2021, 2022, 2023
Hayley Matthews	West Indies	3	2017, **2023**, 2024
Laura Wolvaardt	South Africa	3	2021, 2023, 2024
Alyssa Healy	Australia	2	**2018**, **2019**
Harmanpreet Kaur	India	2	2017, 2018
Shabnim Ismail	South Africa	2	2019, 2021
Sophie Devine	New Zealand	2	2017, 2022
Nida Dar	Pakistan	2	2019, 2022
Marizanne Kapp	South Africa	2	2021, 2024
Richa Ghosh	India	2	2022, 2024
Amelia Kerr	New Zealand	2	2023, **2024**
Chamari Athapaththu	Sri Lanka	2	2023, 2024

=== Appearances by nation ===
Country	2017	2018	2019	2021	2022	2023	2024	Total
Australia	3	4	4		3	4		18
India	2	3	3	1	4	1	3	17
England	1	1	1	5	1	2	1	12
South Africa		1	1	3		1	2	8
New Zealand	2	2			1	1	1	7
West Indies	3					1	1	4
Pakistan			1		1		1	2
Sri Lanka					1	1	1	2
Ireland				1			1	2
Bangladesh		1						1
Zimbabwe				1				1

== See also ==
- ICC Men's ODI Team of the Year
- ICC Women's ODI Team of the Year
- ICC Men's T20I Team of the Year
