= ICC Women's ODI Team of the Year =

International cricket annual award

The ICC Women's ODI Team of the Year is an honour awarded each year by the International Cricket Council. It recognizes the top women's cricket players from around the world in the ODI format of the game. The team does not actually compete, but exists solely as an honorary entity.

== List ==
=== Winners ===
Players marked bold won the ICC Women's ODI Cricketer of the Year in that respective year:

| Year | No. 1 | No. 2 | No. 3 | No. 4 | No. 5 | No. 6 | No. 7 | No. 8 | No. 9 | No. 10 | No. 11 |
|---|---|---|---|---|---|---|---|---|---|---|---|
| 2017 | (England) Tammy Beaumont | (Australia) Meg Lanning | (India) Mithali Raj | (New Zealand) Amy Satterthwaite | (Australia) Ellyse Perry | (England) Heather Knight (c) | (England) Sarah Taylor (wk) | (South Africa) Dane van Niekerk | (South Africa) Marizanne Kapp | (India) Ekta Bisht | (England) Alex Hartley |
| 2018 | (India) Smriti Mandhana | (England) Tammy Beaumont | (New Zealand) Suzie Bates (c) | (South Africa) Dane van Niekerk | (New Zealand) Sophie Devine | (Australia) Alyssa Healy (wk) | (South Africa) Marizanne Kapp | (Cricket West Indies) Deandra Dottin | (Pakistan) Sana Mir | (England) Sophie Ecclestone | (India) Poonam Yadav |
| 2019 | (Australia) Alyssa Healy (wk) | (India) Smriti Mandhana | (England) Tammy Beaumont | (Australia) Meg Lanning (c) | (Cricket West Indies) Stafanie Taylor | (Australia) Ellyse Perry | (Australia) Jess Jonassen | (India) Shikha Pandey | (India) Jhulan Goswami | (Australia) Megan Schutt | (India) Poonam Yadav |
| 2021 | (South Africa) Lizelle Lee | (Australia) Alyssa Healy (wk) | (England) Tammy Beaumont | (India) Mithali Raj | (England) Heather Knight (c) | (Cricket West Indies) Hayley Matthews | (South Africa) Marizanne Kapp | (South Africa) Shabnim Ismail | (Pakistan) Fatima Sana | (India) Jhulan Goswami | (Cricket West Indies) Anisa Mohammed |
| 2022 | (Australia) Alyssa Healy (wk) | (India) Smriti Mandhana | (South Africa) Laura Wolvaardt | (England) Nat Sciver-Brunt | (Australia) Beth Mooney | (India) Harmanpreet Kaur (c) | (New Zealand) Amelia Kerr | (England) Sophie Ecclestone | (South Africa) Ayabonga Khaka | (India) Renuka Singh | (South Africa) Shabnim Ismail |
| 2023 | (Australia) Phoebe Litchfield | (Sri Lanka) Chamari Athapaththu (c) | (Australia) Ellyse Perry | (New Zealand) Amelia Kerr | (Australia) Beth Mooney (wk) | (England) Nat Sciver-Brunt | (Australia) Ashleigh Gardner | (Australia) Annabel Sutherland | (South Africa) Nadine de Klerk | (New Zealand) Lea Tahuhu | (Bangladesh) Nahida Akter |
| 2024 | (India) Smriti Mandhana | (South Africa) Laura Wolvaardt (c) | (Sri Lanka) Chamari Athapaththu | (Cricket West Indies) Hayley Matthews | (South Africa) Marizanne Kapp | (Australia) Ashleigh Gardner | (Australia) Annabel Sutherland | (England) Amy Jones (wk) | (India) Deepti Sharma | (England) Sophie Ecclestone | (England) Kate Cross |

== Superlatives ==
=== Appearances by player ===
Players marked bold are still active in ODI matches and years marked bold indicate they won the ICC Women's ODI Cricketer of the Year in that respective year:

| # | Player | Team | Appearances | Years |
|---|---|---|---|---|
| 1 | **Tammy Beaumont** | England | 4 | 2017, 2018, 2019, 2021 |
| 1 | **Alyssa Healy** | Australia | 4 | 2018, 2019, 2021, 2022 |
| 1 | **Smriti Mandhana** | India | 4 | **2018**, 2019, 2022, **2024** |
| 1 | **Marizanne Kapp** | South Africa | 4 | 2017, 2018, 2019, 2024 |
| 2 | **Ellyse Perry** | Australia | 3 | 2017, **2019**, 2023 |
| 2 | **Sophie Ecclestone** | England | 3 | 2018, 2022, 2024 |
| 3 | Meg Lanning | Australia | 2 | 2017, 2019 |
| 3 | **Poonam Yadav** | India | 2 | 2018, 2019 |
| 3 | Dane van Niekerk | South Africa | 2 | 2017, 2018 |
| 3 | Mithali Raj | India | 2 | 2017, 2021 |
| 3 | **Heather Knight** | England | 2 | 2017, 2021 |
| 3 | Jhulan Goswami | India | 2 | 2019, 2021 |
| 3 | Shabnim Ismail | South Africa | 2 | 2021, 2022 |
| 3 | **Nat Sciver-Brunt** | England | 2 | **2022**, 2023 |
| 3 | **Amelia Kerr** | New Zealand | 2 | 2022, 2023 |
| 3 | **Beth Mooney** | Australia | 2 | 2022, 2023 |
| 3 | **Laura Wolvaardt** | South Africa | 2 | 2022, 2024 |
| 3 | **Chamari Athapaththu** | Sri Lanka | 2 | **2023**, 2024 |
| 3 | **Ashleigh Gardner** | Australia | 2 | 2023, 2024 |
| 3 | **Annabel Sutherland** | Australia | 2 | 2023, 2024 |

=== Appearances by nation ===
| Country | 2017 | 2018 | 2019 | 2021 | 2022 | 2023 | 2024 | Total |
|---|---|---|---|---|---|---|---|---|
| Australia | 2 | 1 | 5 | 1 | 2 | 5 | 2 | 18 |
| India | 2 | 2 | 4 | 2 | 3 | | 2 | 15 |
| England | 4 | 2 | 1 | 2 | 2 | 1 | 3 | 15 |
| South Africa | 2 | 2 | | 3 | 3 | 1 | 2 | 13 |
| New Zealand | 1 | 2 | | | 1 | 2 | | 6 |
| West Indies | | 1 | 1 | 2 | | | 1 | 5 |
| Pakistan | | 1 | | 1 | | | | 2 |
| Sri Lanka | | | | | | 1 | 1 | 2 |
| Bangladesh | | | | | | 1 | | 1 |

== See also ==
- ICC Men's ODI Team of the Year
- ICC Women's T20I Team of the Year
- ICC Men's T20I Team of the Year
