= 2015 ICC Awards =

Cricket award edition

- Date: 23 December 2015
- Presented by: ICC

Highlights
- Men's Cricketer of the Year: (Australia) Steve Smith
- Men's Test Player of the Year: (Australia) Steve Smith
- ODI Player of the Year: Men's: (South Africa) AB de Villiers; Women's: (Australia) Meg Lanning
- Women's T20I Player of the Year: (Cricket West Indies) Stafanie Taylor
- Men's Emerging Player of the Year: (Australia) Josh Hazlewood
- Website: www.icc-cricket.com

The 2015 ICC Awards were awards presented in ten categories by the ICC to international cricket players.

The awards covered and took into account players' performance between 18 September 2014 and 13 September 2015.

== Award categories and winners ==
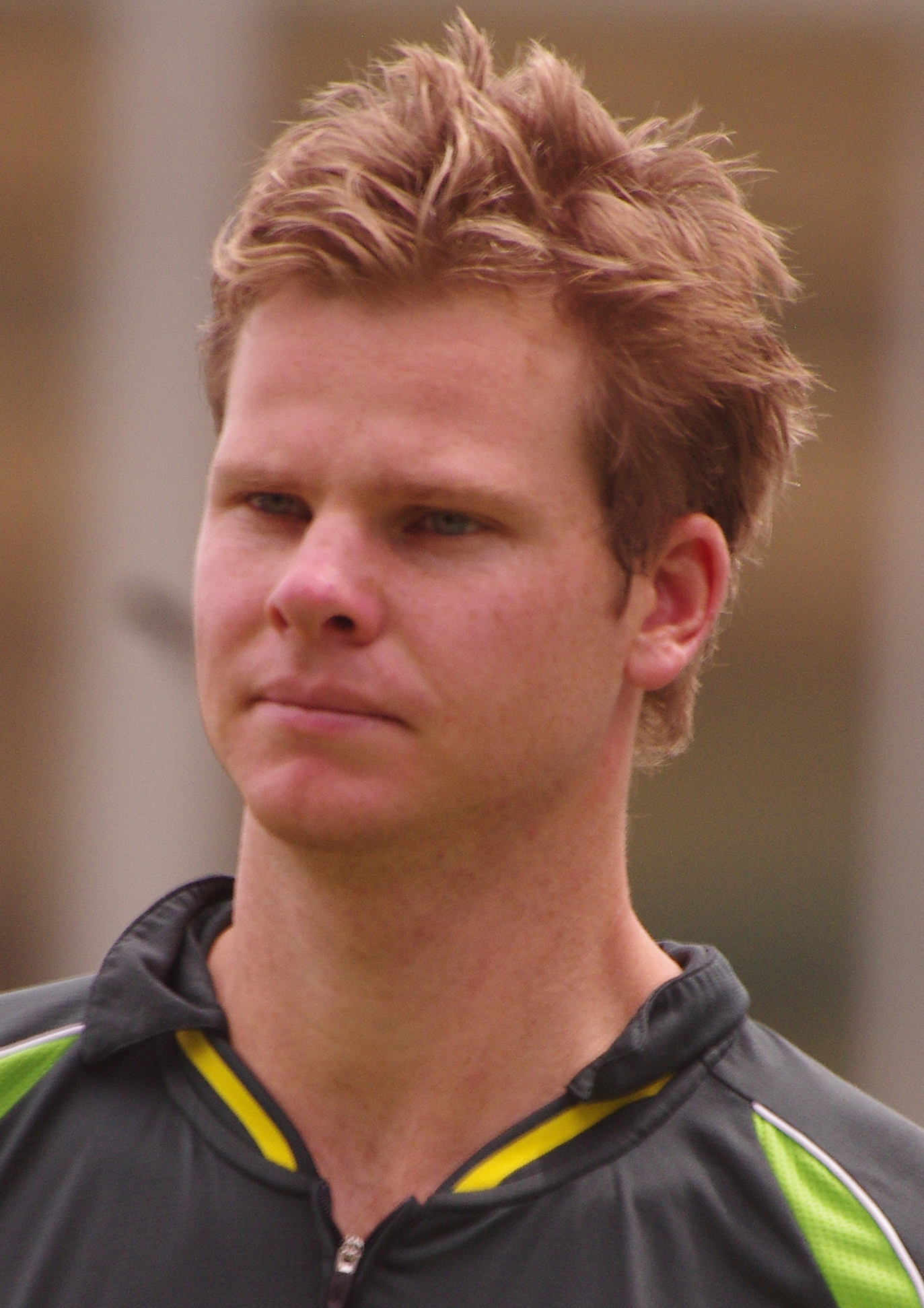
Steve Smith

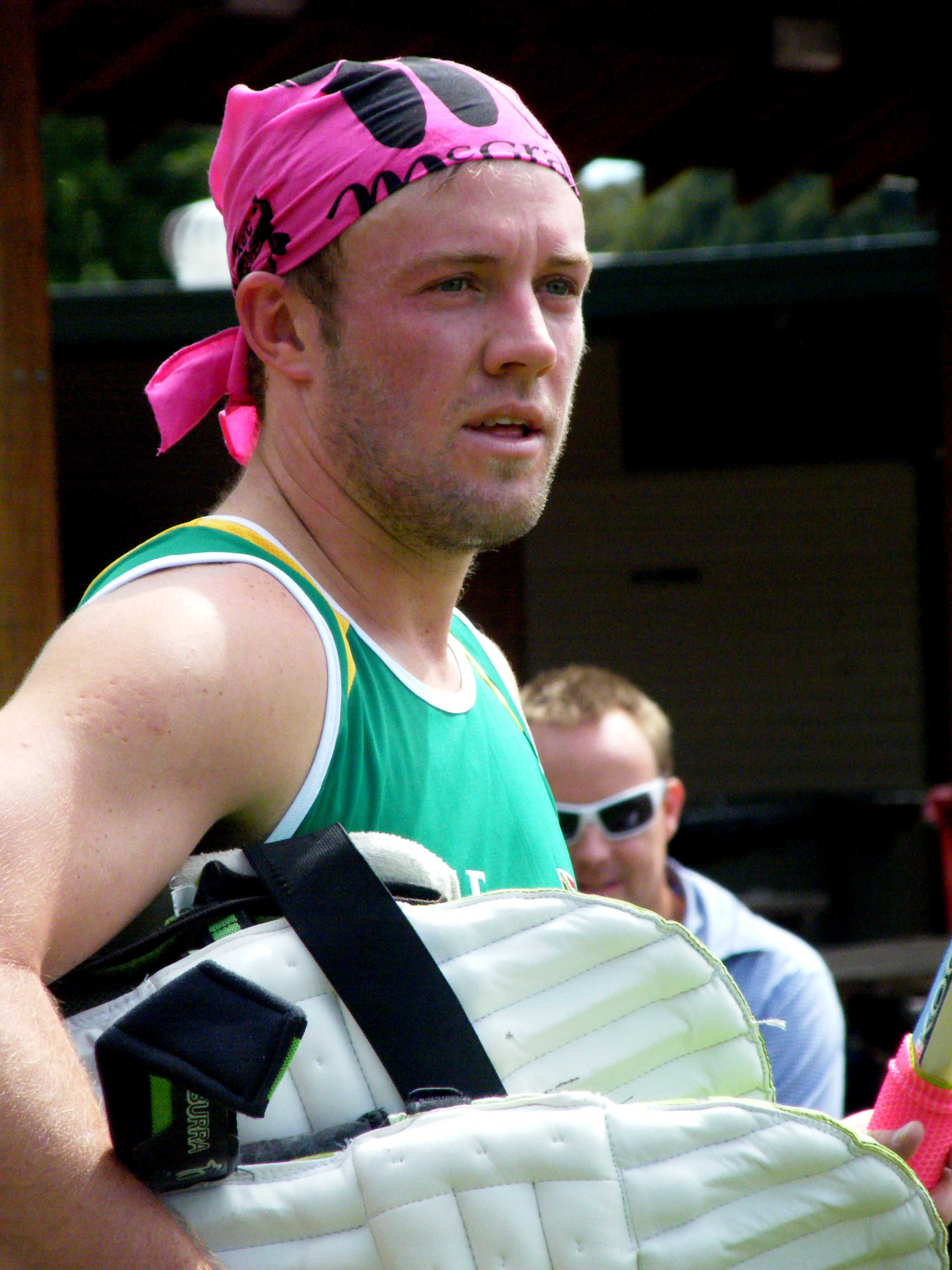
AB de Villiers

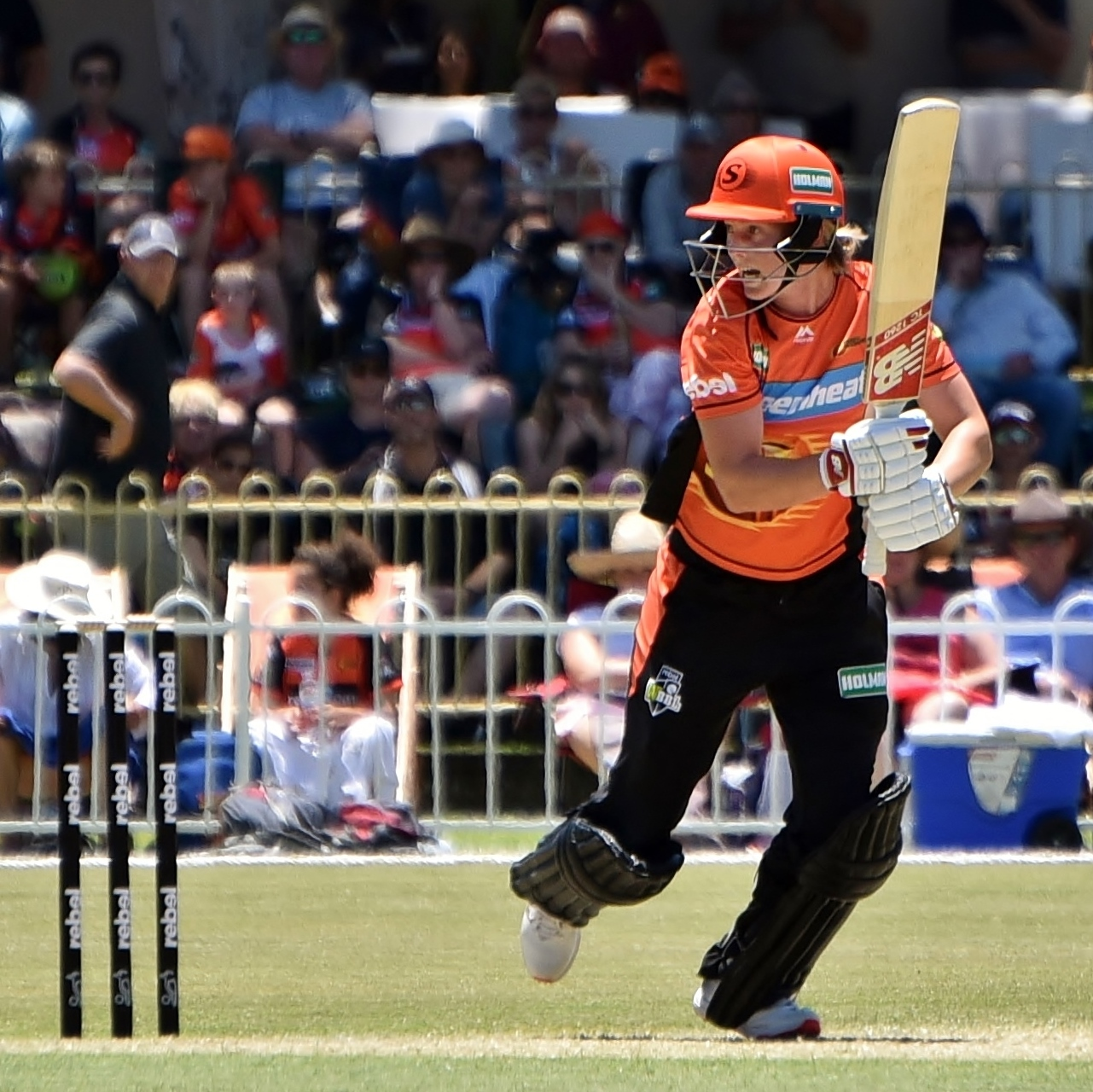
Meg Lanning

=== Individual awards ===
==== Men's awards ====
Men's Cricketer of the Year: (Australia) Steve Smith	Men's Test Player of the Year: (Australia) Steve Smith
Men's ODI Player of the Year: (South Africa) AB de Villiers	Men's Emerging Player of the Year: (Australia) Josh Hazlewood
Men's Associate Player of the Year: (United Arab Emirates) Khurram Khan

==== Women's awards ====
Women's ODI Player of the Year
- (Australia) Meg Lanning
Women's T20I Player of the Year
- (Cricket West Indies) Stafanie Taylor

==== Other awards ====
Umpire of the Year
- (England) Richard Kettleborough
Twenty20 International Performance of the Year
- (South Africa) Faf du Plessis, for scoring 119 runs off 56 deliveries against the West Indies at Wanderers Stadium in Johannesburg on 11 January 2015
Spirit of Cricket
- (New Zealand) Brendon McCullum, whose sportsmanship was noted by the ICC, particularly after the 2015 Cricket World Cup semi-final against South Africa on 24 March 2015

=== ICC Teams of the Year ===
ICC Men's Test Team of the Year

Alastair Cook was selected as the captain of the Test Team of the Year, with Sarfaraz Ahmed selected as the wicket-keeper. Other players are:

- (Australia) David Warner
- (England) Alastair Cook
- (New Zealand) Kane Williamson
- (Pakistan) Younis Khan
- (Australia) Steve Smith
- (England) Joe Root
- (Pakistan) Sarfaraz Ahmed
- (England) Stuart Broad
- (New Zealand) Trent Boult
- (Pakistan) Yasir Shah
- (Australia) Josh Hazlewood
- (India) Ravichandran Ashwin (12th man)

ICC Men's ODI Team of the Year

AB de Villiers was selected as the captain of the ODI Team of the Year, with Kumar Sangakkara selected as the wicket-keeper. Other players are:

- (Sri Lanka) Tillakaratne Dilshan
- (South Africa) Hashim Amla
- (Sri Lanka) Kumar Sangakkara
- (South Africa) AB de Villiers
- (Australia) Steve Smith
- (New Zealand) Ross Taylor
- (New Zealand) Trent Boult
- (India) Mohammed Shami
- (Australia) Mitchell Starc
- (Bangladesh) Mustafizur Rahman
- (South Africa) Imran Tahir
- (England) Joe Root (12th man)

== Selection Committee ==
Both of the ICC World XI Teams were chosen by a specially appointed selection panel, known as the ICC Selection Committee and chaired by ICC Cricket Hall of Famer Anil Kumble.

Selection Committee members:

- (India) Anil Kumble (chairman)
- (Cricket West Indies) Ian Bishop
- (England) Mark Butcher
- (Australia) Belinda Clark
- (India) Gundappa Viswanath

== See also ==
- International Cricket Council
- ICC Awards
- Sir Garfield Sobers Trophy (Cricketer of the Year)
- ICC Test Player of the Year
- ICC ODI Player of the Year
- David Shepherd Trophy (Umpire of the Year)
- ICC Women's Cricketer of the Year
- ICC Test Team of the Year
- ICC ODI Team of the Year
