= 2018 ICC Awards =

Fifteenth edition of International cricket council awards

- Date: 22 January 2019
- Presented by: ICC

Highlights
- Cricketer of the Year: Men's: (India) Virat Kohli; Women's: (India) Smriti Mandhana
- Men's Test Player of the Year: (India) Virat Kohli
- ODI Player of the Year: Men's: (India) Virat Kohli; Women's: (India) Smriti Mandhana
- Women's T20I Player of the Year: (Australia) Alyssa Healy
- Emerging Player of the Year: Men's: (India) Rishabh Pant; Women's: (England) Sophie Ecclestone
- Website: www.icc-cricket.com

The 2018 ICC Awards were the fifteenth edition of the ICC Awards. The voting panel took into account players' performance between 1 January 2018 and 31 December 2018. The announcement of the ICC World XI Teams, along with the winners of the men's individual ICC awards, was made on 22 January 2019. The women's awards were announced on 31 December 2018, with Smriti Mandhana winning the Rachael Heyhoe Flint Award as the Women's Cricketer of the Year. Virat Kohli became the first cricketer in history to win all three major awards.

== Award categories and winners ==
=== Individual awards ===
==== Men's awards ====
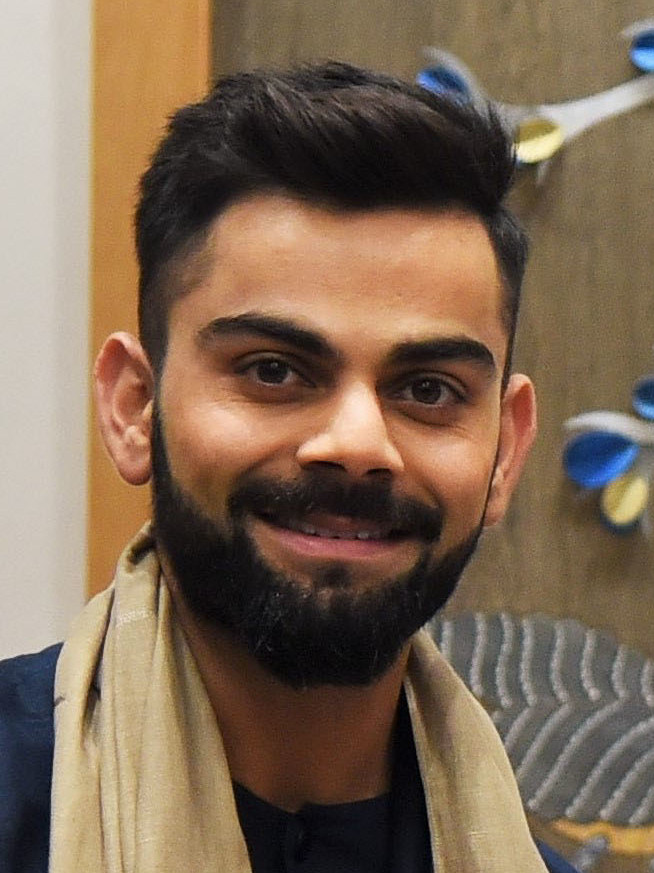
Virat Kohli

| Men's Cricketer of the Year: (India) Virat Kohli | Men's Test Player of the Year: (India) Virat Kohli |
| Men's ODI Player of the Year: (India) Virat Kohli | Men's Emerging Player of the Year: (India) Rishabh Pant |
Men's Associate Player of the Year: (Scotland) Calum MacLeod

==== Women's awards ====
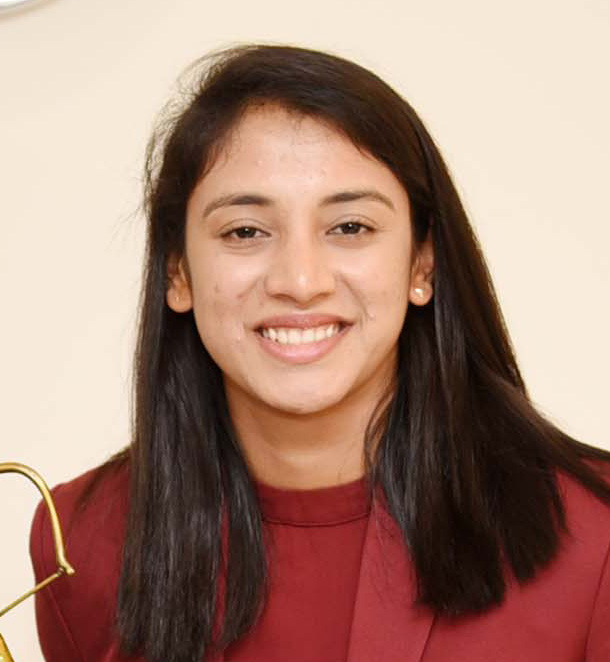
Smriti Mandhana

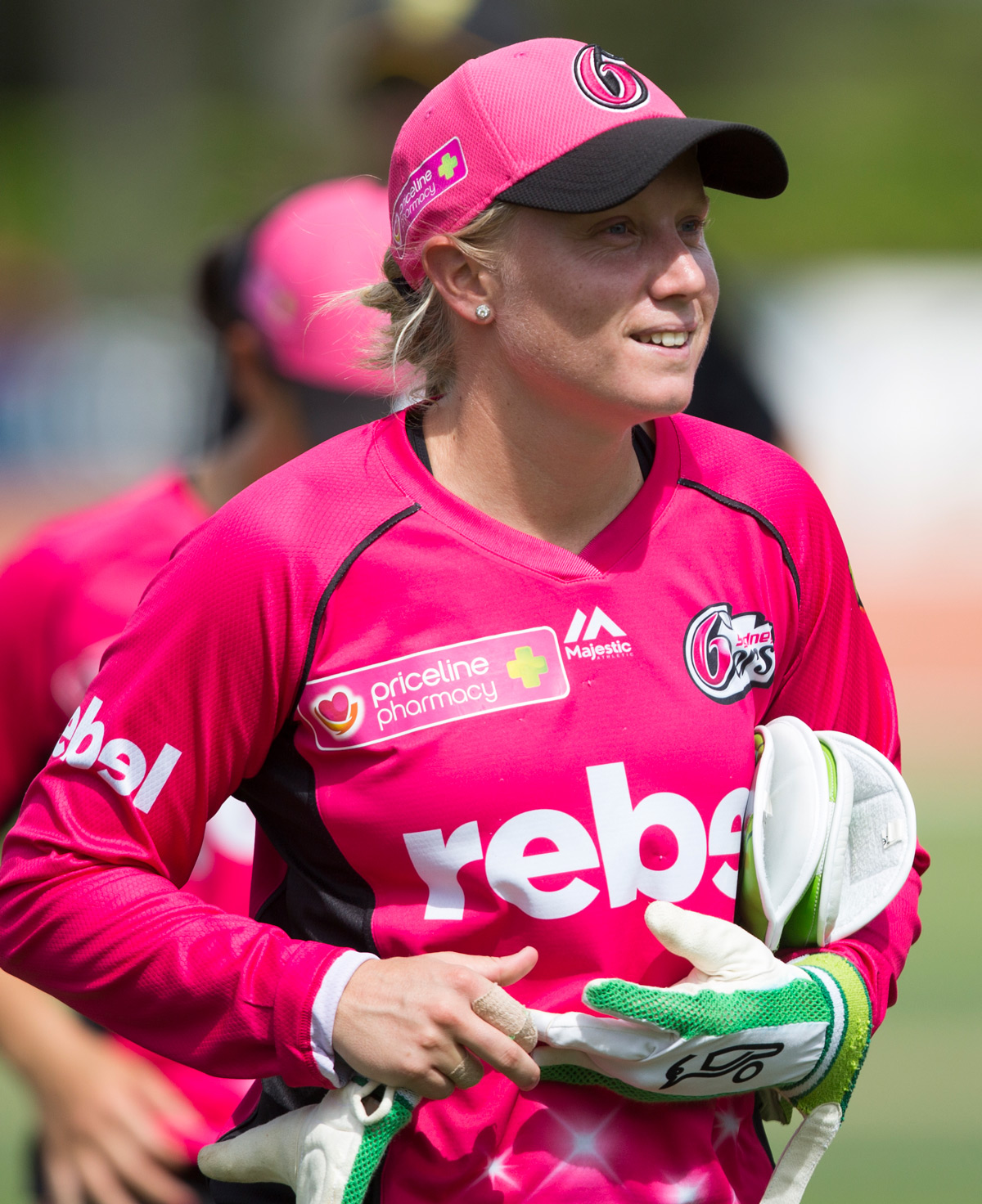
Alyssa Healy

| Women's Cricketer of the Year: (India) Smriti Mandhana | Women's ODI Player of the Year: (India) Smriti Mandhana |
| Women's T20I Player of the Year: (Australia) Alyssa Healy | Women's Emerging Player of the Year: (England) Sophie Ecclestone |

==== Other awards ====
Umpire of the Year
- (Sri Lanka) Kumar Dharmasena
Twenty20 International Performance of the Year
- (Australia) Aaron Finch, for scoring 172 runs off 76 deliveries against Zimbabwe at Harare Sports Club in Harare on 3 July 2018
Spirit of Cricket
- (New Zealand) Kane Williamson, for his behaviour both on and off the field throughout 2018
Fan's Moment of the Year
- India winning the Under-19 Cricket World Cup

=== ICC Teams of the Year ===
==== Men's teams ====
ICC Men's Test Team of the Year

ICC Men's Test Team of the Year
| Batting position | Player | Team | Role |
|---|---|---|---|
| Opener | Tom Latham | New Zealand | Batsman |
| Opener | Dimuth Karunaratne | Sri Lanka | Batsman |
| Number 3 | Kane Williamson | New Zealand | Batsman |
| Number 4 | Virat Kohli | India | Batsman / Captain |
| Number 5 | Henry Nicholls | New Zealand | Batsman |
| Number 6 | Rishabh Pant | India | Batsman / Wicket-keeper |
| Number 7 | Jason Holder | West Indies | All-rounder |
| Number 8 | Kagiso Rabada | South Africa | Bowler |
| Number 9 | Nathan Lyon | Australia | Bowler |
| Number 10 | Jasprit Bumrah | India | Bowler |
| Number 11 | Mohammad Abbas | Pakistan | Bowler |

ICC Men's ODI Team of the Year

ICC Men's ODI Team of the Year
| Batting position | Player | Team | Role |
|---|---|---|---|
| Opener | Rohit Sharma | India | Batsman |
| Opener | Jonny Bairstow | England | Batsman |
| Number 3 | Virat Kohli | India | Batsman / Captain |
| Number 4 | Joe Root | England | Batsman |
| Number 5 | Ross Taylor | New Zealand | Batsman |
| Number 6 | Jos Buttler | England | Batsman / Wicket-keeper |
| Number 7 | Ben Stokes | England | All-rounder |
| Number 8 | Mustafizur Rahman | Bangladesh | Bowler |
| Number 9 | Kuldeep Yadav | India | Bowler |
| Number 10 | Rashid Khan | Afghanistan | Bowler |
| Number 11 | Jasprit Bumrah | India | Bowler |
| Number 12 | Shikhar Dhawan | India | 12th Man |

==== Women's teams ====
ICC Women's ODI Team of the Year

ICC Women's ODI Team of the Year
| Batting position | Player | Team | Role |
|---|---|---|---|
| Opener | Smriti Mandhana | India | Batsman |
| Opener | Tammy Beaumont | Sri Lanka | Batsman |
| Number 3 | Suzie Bates | New Zealand | Batsman |
| Number 4 | Dane van Niekerk | South Africa | Batsman |
| Number 5 | Sophie Devine | New Zealand | All-rounder |
| Number 6 | Alyssa Healy | Australia | Batsman / Wicket-keeper |
| Number 7 | Marizanne Kapp | South Africa | All-rounder |
| Number 8 | Deandra Dottin | West Indies | All-rounder |
| Number 9 | Sana Mir | Pakistan | Bowler |
| Number 10 | Sophie Ecclestone | England | Bowler |
| Number 11 | Poonam Yadav | India | Bowler |

ICC Women's T20I Team of the Year

ICC Women's T20I Team of the Year
| Batting position | Player | Team | Role |
|---|---|---|---|
| Opener | Smriti Mandhana | India | Batsman |
| Opener | Alyssa Healy | Australia | Batsman / Wicket-keeper |
| Number 3 | Suzie Bates | New Zealand | Batsman |
| Number 4 | Harmanpreet Kaur | India | Batsman / Captain |
| Number 5 | Natalie Sciver | England | Batsman |
| Number 6 | Ellyse Perry | Australia | All-rounder |
| Number 7 | Ashleigh Gardner | Australia | All-rounder |
| Number 8 | Leigh Kasperek | New Zealand | Bowler |
| Number 9 | Megan Schutt | Australia | Bowler |
| Number 10 | Rumana Ahmed | Bangladesh | Bowler |
| Number 11 | Poonam Yadav | India | Bowler |

== See also ==
- International Cricket Council
- ICC Awards
- Sir Garfield Sobers Trophy (Cricketer of the Year)
- ICC Test Player of the Year
- ICC ODI Player of the Year
- David Shepherd Trophy (Umpire of the Year)
- ICC Women's Cricketer of the Year
- ICC Test Team of the Year
- ICC ODI Team of the Year
