= ICC Men's Test Cricketer of the Year =

International cricket annual award

ICC Award for Best Men's Test Cricketer of the Year
- Awarded for: Best performance over year in Test cricket
- Presented by: ICC
- First award: 2004
- Final award: 2024
- Currently held by: (India) Jasprit Bumrah (1st award)

Highlights
- Most awards: (Australia) Steve Smith (2 awards)
- Website: ICC Awards

The ICC Men's Test Cricketer of the Year is an annual award, presented since 2004 by the International Cricket Council to the best Test cricketer over the year in question. It is one of the annual ICC Awards.

== Selection ==
The recipient of the annual award is selected by an "academy" of 56 individuals (expanded from 50 in 2004), including the current national team captains of the Test-playing nations (10), members of the elite panel of ICC umpires and referees (18), and certain prominent former players and cricket correspondents (28). In the event of a tie in the voting, the award is shared.

== List of Winners ==
Year	Winner	Also Nominated
2004	(India) Rahul Dravid	(England) Andrew Flintoff (England) Steve Harmison (Australia) Ricky Ponting (Australia) Matthew Hayden (Australia) Adam Gilchrist (Australia) Jason Gillespie (South Africa) Jacques Kallis (Cricket West Indies) Brian Lara (India) VVS Laxman (India) Virender Sehwag (Sri Lanka) Muttiah Muralitharan
2005	(South Africa) Jacques Kallis	(Pakistan) Inzamam-ul-Haq (Australia) Adam Gilchrist (Australia) Glenn McGrath (Australia) Shane Warne
2006	(Australia) Ricky Ponting	(Pakistan) Mohammad Yousuf (Australia) Mike Hussey (Sri Lanka) Mahela Jayawardene (Australia) Shane Warne
2007	(Pakistan) Mohammad Yousuf	(Australia) Ricky Ponting (Sri Lanka) Mahela Jayawardene (Sri Lanka) Muttiah Muralitharan (Pakistan) Mohammad Asif
2008	(South Africa) Dale Steyn	(Cricket West Indies) Shivnarine Chanderpaul (Sri Lanka) Mahela Jayawardene (South Africa) Jacques Kallis
2009	(India) Gautam Gambhir	(Australia) Mitchell Johnson (Sri Lanka) Thilan Samaraweera (England) Andrew Strauss
2010	(India) Virender Sehwag	(India) Sachin Tendulkar (South Africa) Hashim Amla (South Africa) Dale Steyn
2011	(England) Alastair Cook	—N/a
2012	(Sri Lanka) Kumar Sangakkara	—N/a
2013	(Australia) Michael Clarke	—N/a
2014	(Australia) Mitchell Johnson	—N/a
2015	(Australia) Steve Smith	—N/a
2016	(India) Ravichandran Ashwin	—N/a
2017	(Australia) Steve Smith	—N/a
2018	(India) Virat Kohli	—N/a
2019	(Australia) Pat Cummins	—N/a
2021	(England) Joe Root	(India) Ravichandran Ashwin (New Zealand) Kyle Jamieson (Sri Lanka) Dimuth Karunaratne
2022	(England) Ben Stokes	(England) Jonny Bairstow (Australia) Usman Khawaja (South Africa) Kagiso Rabada
2023	(Australia) Usman Khawaja	(Australia) Travis Head (India) Ravichandran Ashwin (England) Joe Root
2024	(India) Jasprit Bumrah	(England) Harry Brook (Sri Lanka) Kamindu Mendis (England) Joe Root

=== Wins by player ===
Player	Winner
(Australia) Steve Smith	2 (2015, 2017)
(India) Rahul Dravid	1 (2004)
(South Africa) Jacques Kallis	1 (2005)
(Australia) Ricky Ponting	1 (2006)
(Pakistan) Mohammad Yousuf	1 (2007)
(South Africa) Dale Steyn	1 (2008)
(India) Gautam Gambhir	1 (2009)
(India) Virender Sehwag	1 (2010)
(England) Alastair Cook	1 (2011)
(Sri Lanka) Kumar Sangakkara	1 (2012)
(Australia) Michael Clarke	1 (2013)
(Australia) Mitchell Johnson	1 (2014)
(India) Ravichandran Ashwin	1 (2016)
(India) Virat Kohli	1 (2018)
(Australia) Pat Cummins	1 (2019)
(England) Joe Root	1 (2021)
(England) Ben Stokes	1 (2022)
(Australia) Usman Khawaja	1 (2023)
(India) Jasprit Bumrah	1 (2024)

=== Wins by country ===
Country	Players	Total
Australia	6	7
India	6	6
England	3	3
South Africa	2	2
Pakistan	1	1
Sri Lanka	1	1

== See also ==
- ICC Awards
