= 2024 ICC Awards =

International cricket award

- Date: 24–28 January 2025
- Presented by: International Cricket Council

Highlights
- Cricketer of the Year: Men's: (India) Jasprit Bumrah; Women's: (New Zealand) Amelia Kerr
- Men's Test Cricketer of the Year: (India) Jasprit Bumrah
- ODI Cricketer of the Year: Men's: (Afghanistan) Azmatullah Omarzai; Women's: (India) Smriti Mandhana
- T20I Cricketer of the Year: Men's: (India) Arshdeep Singh; Women's: (New Zealand) Amelia Kerr
- Emerging Cricketer of the Year: Men's: (Sri Lanka) Kamindu Mendis; Women's: (South Africa) Annerie Dercksen
- Website: www.icc-cricket.com

The 2024 ICC Awards were the 21st edition of ICC Awards. The nominations took into account players' performance between 1 January 2024 and 31 December 2024.

== Winners and nominees ==
The shortlists of the nominations for individual award categories were announced from 28 to 30 December 2024.

=== Men's awards ===
Men's Cricketer of the Year: (India) Jasprit Bumrah; (England) Harry Brook; (Australia) Travis Head; (England) Joe Root	Men's Test Cricketer of the Year: (India) Jasprit Bumrah; (England) Harry Brook; (Sri Lanka) Kamindu Mendis; (England) Joe Root
Men's ODI Cricketer of the Year: (Afghanistan) Azmatullah Omarzai; (Sri Lanka) Wanindu Hasaranga; (Sri Lanka) Kusal Mendis; (Cricket West Indies) Sherfane Rutherford	Men's T20I Cricketer of the Year: (India) Arshdeep Singh; (Pakistan) Babar Azam; (Australia) Travis Head; (Zimbabwe) Sikandar Raza
Men's Emerging Cricketer of the Year: (Sri Lanka) Kamindu Mendis; (Pakistan) Saim Ayub; (England) Gus Atkinson; (Cricket West Indies) Shamar Joseph	Men's Associate Cricketer of the Year: (Namibia) Gerhard Erasmus

=== Women's awards ===
Women's Cricketer of the Year: (New Zealand) Amelia Kerr; (Sri Lanka) Chamari Athapaththu; (Australia) Annabel Sutherland; (South Africa) Laura Wolvaardt	Women's ODI Cricketer of the Year: (India) Smriti Mandhana; (Sri Lanka) Chamari Athapaththu; (Australia) Annabel Sutherland; (South Africa) Laura Wolvaardt
Women's T20I Cricketer of the Year: (New Zealand) Amelia Kerr; (Sri Lanka) Chamari Athapaththu; (Ireland) Orla Prendergast; (South Africa) Laura Wolvaardt	Women's Emerging Cricketer of the Year: (South Africa) Annerie Dercksen; (Scotland) Saskia Horley; (India) Shreyanka Patil; (Ireland) Freya Sargent
Women's Associate Cricketer of the Year: (United Arab Emirates) Esha Oza

=== Other awards ===
Umpire of the Year
- (England) Richard Illingworth

=== ICC Teams of the Year ===
==== Men's teams ====
ICC Men's Test Team of the Year

ICC Men's Test Team of the Year
Batting position	Player	Team	Role
Opener	Yashasvi Jaiswal	India	Batsman
Opener	Ben Duckett	England	Batsman
Number 3	Kane Williamson	New Zealand	Batsman
Number 4	Joe Root	England	Batsman
Number 5	Harry Brook	England	Batsman
Number 6	Kamindu Mendis	Sri Lanka	Batsman
Number 7	Jamie Smith	England	Batsman / Wicket-keeper
Number 8	Ravindra Jadeja	India	All-rounder
Number 9	Pat Cummins	Australia	Bowler / Captain
Number 10	Matt Henry	New Zealand	Bowler
Number 11	Jasprit Bumrah	India	Bowler

ICC Men's ODI Team of the Year

ICC Men's ODI Team of the Year
Batting position	Player	Team	Role
Opener	Saim Ayub	Pakistan	Batsman
Opener	Rahmanullah Gurbaz	Afghanistan	Batsman / Wicket-keeper
Number 3	Pathum Nissanka	Sri Lanka	Batsman
Number 4	Kusal Mendis	Sri Lanka	Batsman / Wicket-keeper
Number 5	Charith Asalanka	Sri Lanka	All-rounder / Captain
Number 6	Sherfane Rutherford	West Indies	All-rounder
Number 7	Azmatullah Omarzai	Afghanistan	All-rounder
Number 8	Wanindu Hasaranga	Sri Lanka	Bowler
Number 9	Shaheen Afridi	Pakistan	Bowler
Number 10	Haris Rauf	Pakistan	Bowler
Number 11	Allah Mohammad Ghazanfar	Afghanistan	Bowler

ICC Men's T20I Team of the Year

ICC Men's T20I Team of the Year
Batting position	Player	Team	Role
Opener	Rohit Sharma	India	Batsman / Captain
Opener	Travis Head	Australia	Batsman
Number 3	Phil Salt	England	Batsman
Number 4	Babar Azam	Pakistan	Batsman
Number 5	Nicholas Pooran	West Indies	Batsman / Wicket-keeper
Number 6	Sikandar Raza	Zimbabwe	All-rounder
Number 7	Hardik Pandya	India	All-rounder
Number 8	Rashid Khan	Afghanistan	All-rounder
Number 9	Wanindu Hasaranga	Sri Lanka	All-rounder
Number 10	Jasprit Bumrah	India	Bowler
Number 11	Arshdeep Singh	India	Bowler

==== Women's teams ====
ICC Women's ODI Team of the Year

ICC Women's ODI Team of the Year
Batting position	Player	Team	Role
Opener	Smriti Mandhana	India	Batter
Opener	Laura Wolvaardt	South Africa	Batter / Captain
Number 3	Chamari Athapaththu	Sri Lanka	Batter
Number 4	Hayley Matthews	West Indies	All-rounder
Number 5	Marizanne Kapp	South Africa	All-rounder
Number 6	Ashleigh Gardner	Australia	All-rounder
Number 7	Annabel Sutherland	Australia	All-rounder
Number 8	Amy Jones	England	Batter / Wicket-keeper
Number 9	Deepti Sharma	India	All-rounder
Number 10	Sophie Ecclestone	England	Bowler
Number 11	Kate Cross	England	Bowler

ICC Women's T20I Team of the Year

ICC Women's T20I Team of the Year
Batting position	Player	Team	Role
Opener	Laura Wolvaardt	South Africa	Batter / Captain
Opener	Smriti Mandhana	India	Batter
Number 3	Chamari Athapaththu	Sri Lanka	Batter
Number 4	Hayley Matthews	West Indies	All-rounder
Number 5	Nat Sciver-Brunt	England	All-rounder
Number 6	Amelia Kerr	New Zealand	All-rounder
Number 7	Richa Ghosh	India	Batter / Wicket-keeper
Number 8	Marizanne Kapp	South Africa	All-rounder
Number 9	Orla Prendergast	Ireland	All-rounder
Number 10	Deepti Sharma	India	All-rounder
Number 11	Sadia Iqbal	Pakistan	Bowler
