= 2017 ICC Awards =

Awards edition

- Date: 18 January 2018
- Presented by: ICC

Highlights
- Cricketer of the Year: Men's: (India) Virat Kohli; Women's: (Australia) Ellyse Perry
- Men's Test Player of the Year: (Australia) Steve Smith
- ODI Player of the Year: Men's: (India) Virat Kohli; Women's: (New Zealand) Amy Satterthwaite
- Women's T20I Player of the Year: (Australia) Beth Mooney
- Emerging Player of the Year: Men's: (Pakistan) Hasan Ali; Women's: (Australia) Beth Mooney
- Website: www.icc-cricket.com

The 2017 ICC Awards were the fourteenth edition of ICC Awards. The voting panel took into account players' performance between 21 September 2016 and 31 December 2017. The announcement of the ICC World XI Teams, along with the winners of the men's individual ICC awards, was made on 18 January 2018. The women's awards were announced on 21 December 2017, with Ellyse Perry winning the inaugural Rachael Heyhoe Flint Award as the Women's Cricketer of the Year.

== Award categories and winners ==
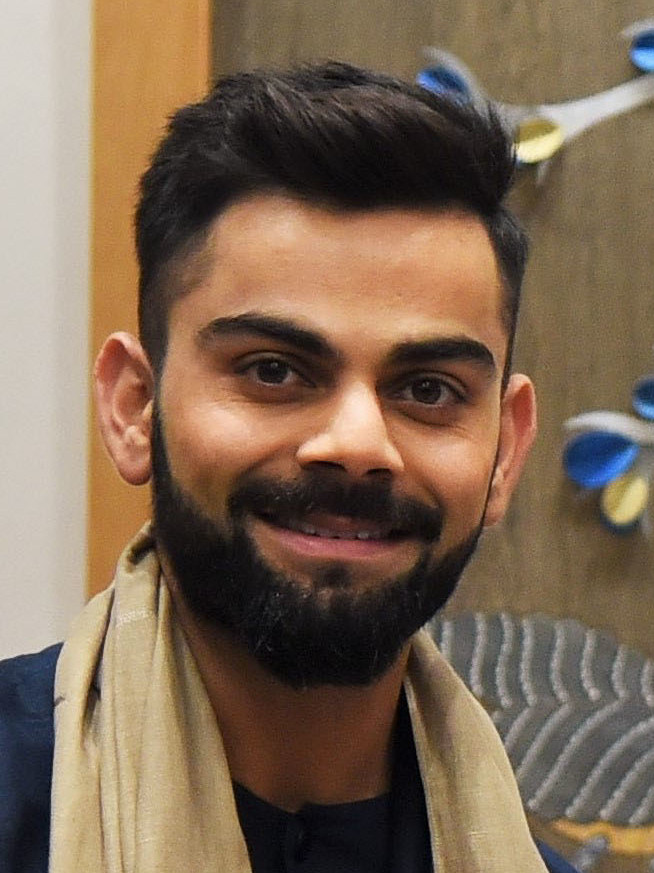
Virat Kohli

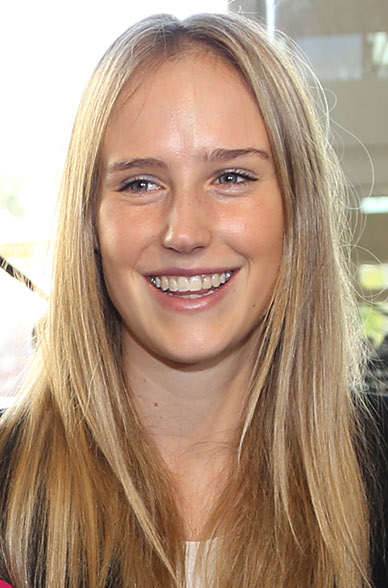
Ellyse Perry

=== Individual awards ===
==== Men's awards ====
Men's Cricketer of the Year: (India) Virat Kohli	Men's Test Player of the Year: (Australia) Steve Smith
Men's ODI Player of the Year: (India) Virat Kohli	Men's Emerging Player of the Year: (Pakistan) Hasan Ali
Men's Associate Player of the Year: (Afghanistan) Rashid Khan

==== Women's awards ====
Women's Cricketer of the Year: (Australia) Ellyse Perry	Women's ODI Player of the Year: (New Zealand) Amy Satterthwaite
Women's T20I Player of the Year: (Australia) Beth Mooney	Women's Emerging Player of the Year: (Australia) Beth Mooney

==== Other awards ====
Umpire of the Year
- (South Africa) Marais Erasmus
Twenty20 International Performance of the Year
- (India) Yuzvendra Chahal, for taking 6/25 from his allotted four overs against England at M. Chinnaswamy Stadium in Bangalore on 1 February 2017
Spirit of Cricket
- (England) Anya Shrubsole, for consoling Dane van Niekerk after defeating South Africa by two wickets in the semi-final of the 2017 Women's Cricket World Cup on 18 July 2017
Fan's Moment of the Year
- Pakistan stun India to win by 180 runs in the 2017 ICC Champions Trophy Final

=== ICC Teams of the Year ===
==== Men's teams ====
ICC Men's Test Team of the Year

ICC Men's Test Team of the Year
Batting position	Player	Team	Role
Opener	Dean Elgar	South Africa	Batsman
Opener	David Warner	Australia	Batsman
Number 3	Virat Kohli	India	Batsman / Captain
Number 4	Steve Smith	Australia	Batsman
Number 5	Cheteshwar Pujara	India	Batsman
Number 6	Ben Stokes	England	All-rounder
Number 7	Quinton de Kock	South Africa	Batsman / Wicket-keeper
Number 8	Ravichandran Ashwin	India	All-rounder
Number 9	Mitchell Starc	Australia	Bowler
Number 10	Kagiso Rabada	South Africa	Bowler
Number 11	James Anderson	England	Bowler

ICC Men's ODI Team of the Year

ICC Men's ODI Team of the Year
Batting position	Player	Team	Role
Opener	David Warner	Australia	Batsman
Opener	Rohit Sharma	India	Batsman
Number 3	Virat Kohli	India	Batsman / Captain
Number 4	Babar Azam	Pakistan	Batsman
Number 5	AB de Villiers	South Africa	Batsman
Number 6	Quinton de Kock	South Africa	Batsman / Wicket-keeper
Number 7	Ben Stokes	England	All-rounder
Number 8	Trent Boult	New Zealand	Bowler
Number 9	Hasan Ali	Pakistan	Bowler
Number 10	Rashid Khan	Afghanistan	Bowler
Number 11	Jasprit Bumrah	India	Bowler

==== Women's teams ====
ICC Women's ODI Team of the Year

ICC Women's ODI Team of the Year
Batting position	Player	Team	Role
Opener	Tammy Beaumont	England	Batter
Opener	Meg Lanning	Australia	Batter
Number 3	Mithali Raj	India	Batter
Number 4	Amy Satterthwaite	New Zealand	Batter
Number 5	Ellyse Perry	Australia	All-rounder
Number 6	Heather Knight	England	Batter / Captain
Number 7	Sarah Taylor	England	Batter / Wicket-keeper
Number 8	Dane van Niekerk	South Africa	Bowler
Number 9	Marizanne Kapp	South Africa	Bowler
Number 10	Ekta Bisht	India	Bowler
Number 11	Alex Hartley	England	Bowler

ICC Women's T20I Team of the Year

ICC Women's T20I Team of the Year
Batting position	Player	Team	Role
Opener	Danielle Wyatt	England	Batter
Opener	Beth Mooney	Australia	Batter / Wicket-keeper
Number 3	Harmanpreet Kaur	India	All-rounder
Number 4	Sophie Devine	New Zealand	Batter
Number 5	Stafanie Taylor	West Indies	All-rounder / Captain
Number 6	Deandra Dottin	West Indies	All-rounder
Number 7	Hayley Matthews	West Indies	All-rounder
Number 8	Megan Schutt	Australia	Bowler
Number 9	Amanda-Jade Wellington	Australia	Bowler
Number 10	Lea Tahuhu	New Zealand	Bowler
Number 11	Ekta Bisht	India	Bowler

== See also ==
- International Cricket Council
- ICC Awards
- Sir Garfield Sobers Trophy (Cricketer of the Year)
- ICC Test Player of the Year
- ICC ODI Player of the Year
- David Shepherd Trophy (Umpire of the Year)
- ICC Women's Cricketer of the Year
- ICC Test Team of the Year
- ICC ODI Team of the Year
