= ICC Men's ODI Cricketer of the Year =

International cricket annual award

ICC Award for Best Men's ODI Cricketer of the Year
- Awarded for: Best Performance by a Player in ODI Cricket
- Presented by: ICC
- First award: 2004
- Final award: 2024
- Currently held by: (Afghanistan) Azmatullah Omarzai (1st award)

Highlights
- Most awards: (India) Virat Kohli (4 awards)
- Website: ICC Awards

The ICC Men's ODI Cricketer of the Year is an annual award presented since 2004 by the International Cricket Council to the best One Day International cricketer. It is one of the annual ICC Awards.

== Selection ==
The recipient of the annual award is selected by an "academy" of 56 individuals (expanded from 50 in 2004), including the current national team captains of the Test-playing nations (10), members of the elite panel of ICC umpires and referees (18), and certain prominent former players and cricket correspondents (28). In the event of a tie in the voting, the award is shared.

== List of winners ==
Year	Winner	Shortlisted
2004	(England) Andrew Flintoff	(India) Sachin Tendulkar; (Pakistan) Abdul Razzaq; (Australia) Ricky Ponting; (Sri Lanka) Muttiah Muralitharan
2005	(England) Kevin Pietersen	(England) Andrew Flintoff; (Australia) Adam Gilchrist; (Australia) Brett Lee; (Australia) Andrew Symonds
2006	(Australia) Michael Hussey	(Sri Lanka) Mahela Jayawardene; (Australia) Ricky Ponting; (India) Yuvraj Singh
2007	(Australia) Matthew Hayden	(South Africa) Jacques Kallis; (Australia) Glenn McGrath; (Australia) Ricky Ponting
2008	(India) MS Dhoni	(Pakistan) Mohammed Yousuf; (Australia) Nathan Bracken; (India) Sachin Tendulkar
2009	(India) MS Dhoni	(Cricket West Indies) Shivnarine Chanderpaul; (India) Virender Sehwag; (India) Yuvraj Singh; (Pakistan) Umar Gul
2010	(South Africa) AB de Villiers	(India) Sachin Tendulkar; (Australia) Shane Watson; (Australia) Ryan Harris
2011	(Sri Lanka) Kumar Sangakkara	(South Africa) Hashim Amla; (India) Gautam Gambhir; (Australia) Shane Watson
2012	(India) Virat Kohli	(India) MS Dhoni; (Sri Lanka) Lasith Malinga; (Sri Lanka) Kumar Sangakkara
2013	(Sri Lanka) Kumar Sangakkara	(India) Shikhar Dhawan; (India) Ravindra Jadeja; (Pakistan) Saeed Ajmal; (Pakistan) Misbah-ul-Haq
2014	(South Africa) AB de Villiers	(India) Virat Kohli; (South Africa) Quinton de Kock; (South Africa) Dale Steyn
2015	(South Africa) AB de Villiers	(Sri Lanka) Kumar Sangakkara; (New Zealand) Trent Boult; (Australia) Mitchell Starc
2016	(South Africa) Quinton de Kock	
2017	(India) Virat Kohli	
2018	(India) Virat Kohli	
2019	(India) Rohit Sharma	
2021	(Pakistan) Babar Azam	(Bangladesh) Shakib Al Hasan; (South Africa) Janneman Malan; (Ireland) Paul Stirling
2022	(Pakistan) Babar Azam	(Australia) Adam Zampa; (Zimbabwe) Sikandar Raza; (Cricket West Indies) Shai Hope
2023	(India) Virat Kohli	(India) Shubman Gill; (India) Mohammed Shami; (New Zealand) Daryl Mitchell
2024	(Afghanistan) Azmatullah Omarzai	(Sri Lanka) Wanindu Hasaranga; (Sri Lanka) Kusal Mendis; (Cricket West Indies) Sherfane Rutherford

== Superlatives ==
=== Wins by player ===
Player	Winner
(India) Virat Kohli	4 (2012, 2017, 2018, 2023)
(South Africa) AB de Villiers	3 (2010, 2014, 2015)
(India) MS Dhoni	2 (2008, 2009)
(Sri Lanka) Kumar Sangakkara	2 (2011, 2013)
(Pakistan) Babar Azam	2 (2021, 2022)
(England) Andrew Flintoff	1 (2004)
(England) Kevin Pietersen	1 (2005)
(Australia) Michael Hussey	1 (2006)
(Australia) Matthew Hayden	1 (2007)
(South Africa) Quinton de Kock	1 (2016)
(India) Rohit Sharma	1 (2019)
(Afghanistan) Azmatullah Omarzai	1 (2024)

=== Wins by country ===
Country	Players	Total
India	3	7
South Africa	2	4
England	2	2
Australia	2	2
Sri Lanka	1	2
Pakistan	1	2
Afghanistan	1	1
