= 2014 ICC Awards =

- Date: 15–16 November 2014
- Presented by: ICC

Highlights
- Men's Cricketer of the Year: (Australia) Mitchell Johnson
- Men's Test Player of the Year: (Australia) Mitchell Johnson
- ODI Player of the Year: Men's: (South Africa) AB de Villiers; Women's: (England) Sarah Taylor
- Women's ODI Player of the Year: (Australia) Meg Lanning
- Men's Emerging Player of the Year: (England) Gary Ballance
- Website: www.icc-cricket.com

The 2014 ICC Awards followed the same formal event which was implemented in 2013 as a TV show. The voting panel took into account players' performance between 26 August 2013 and 17 September 2014. The show was broadcast globally on 15–16 November. The ICC awards the Sir Garfield Sobers Trophy to the Cricketer of the Year, which is considered to be the most prestigious award in world cricket.

== Award categories and winners ==
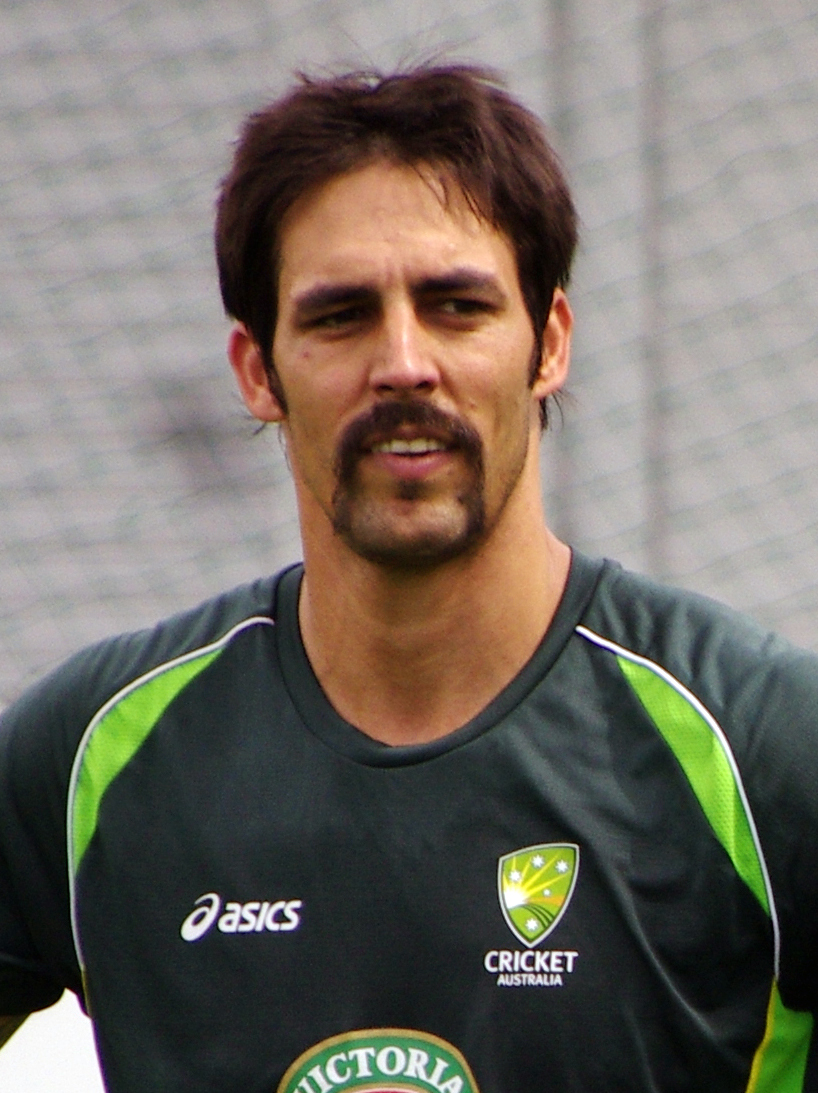
Mitchell Johnson

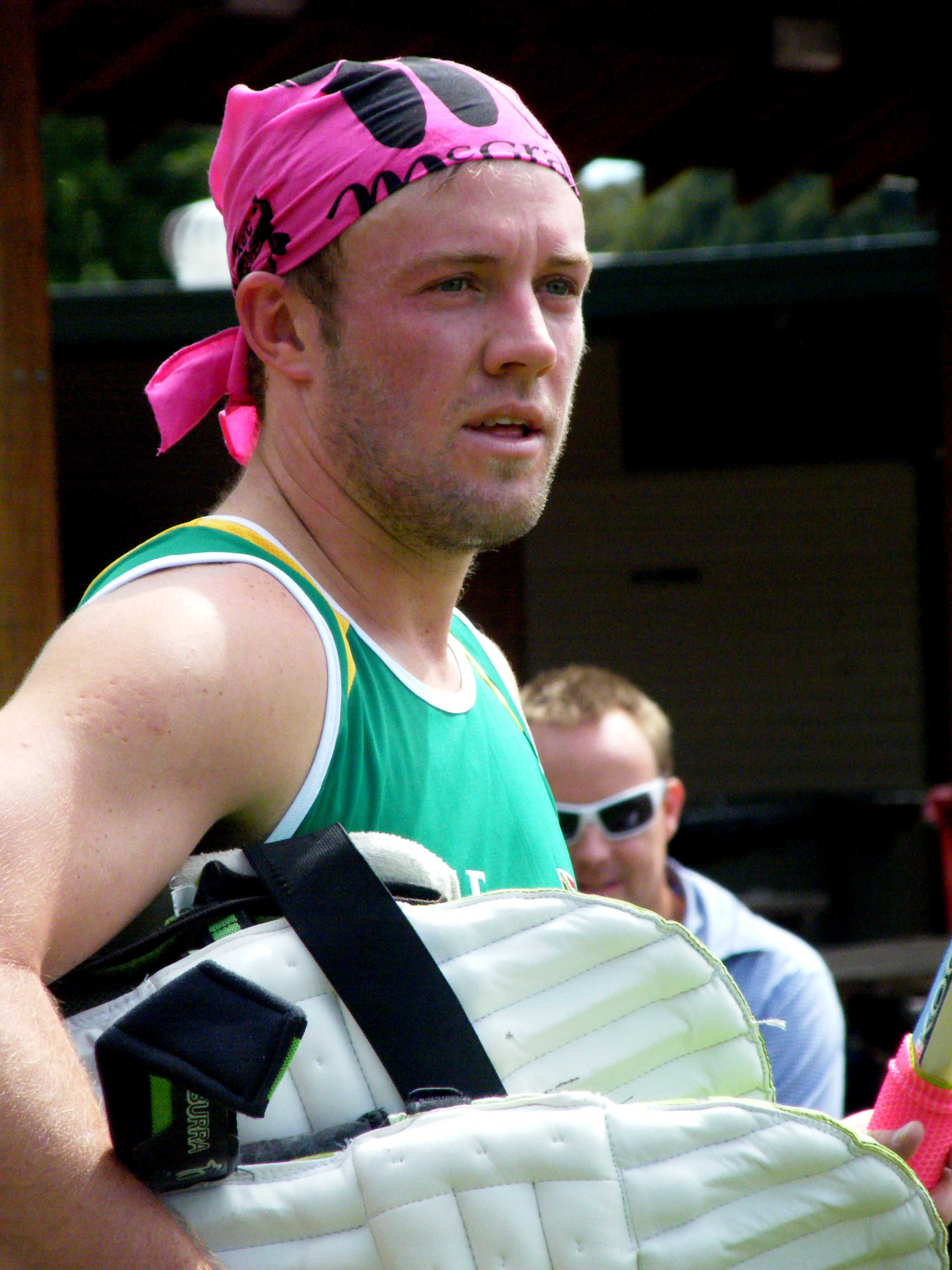
AB de Villiers

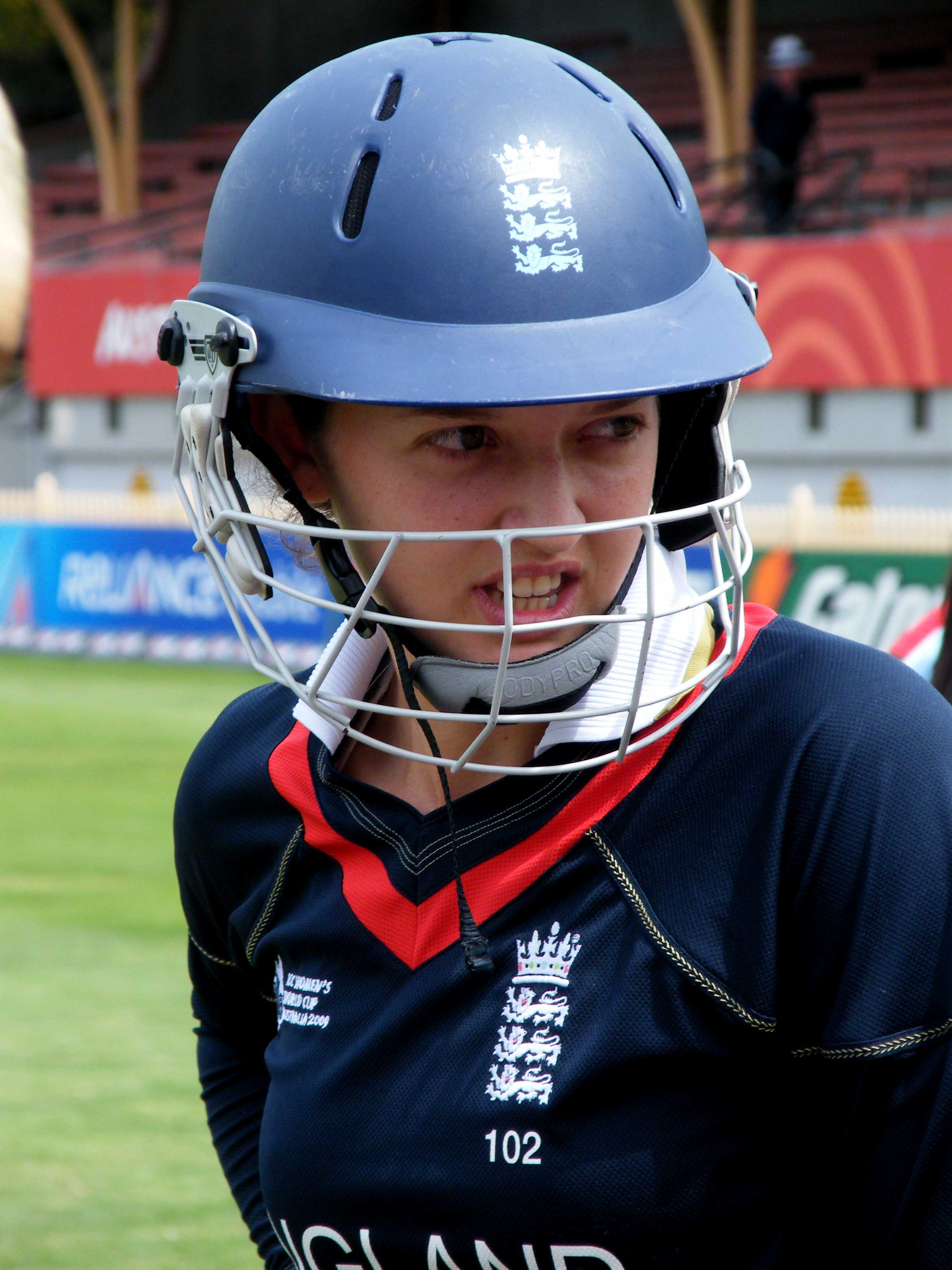
Sarah Taylor

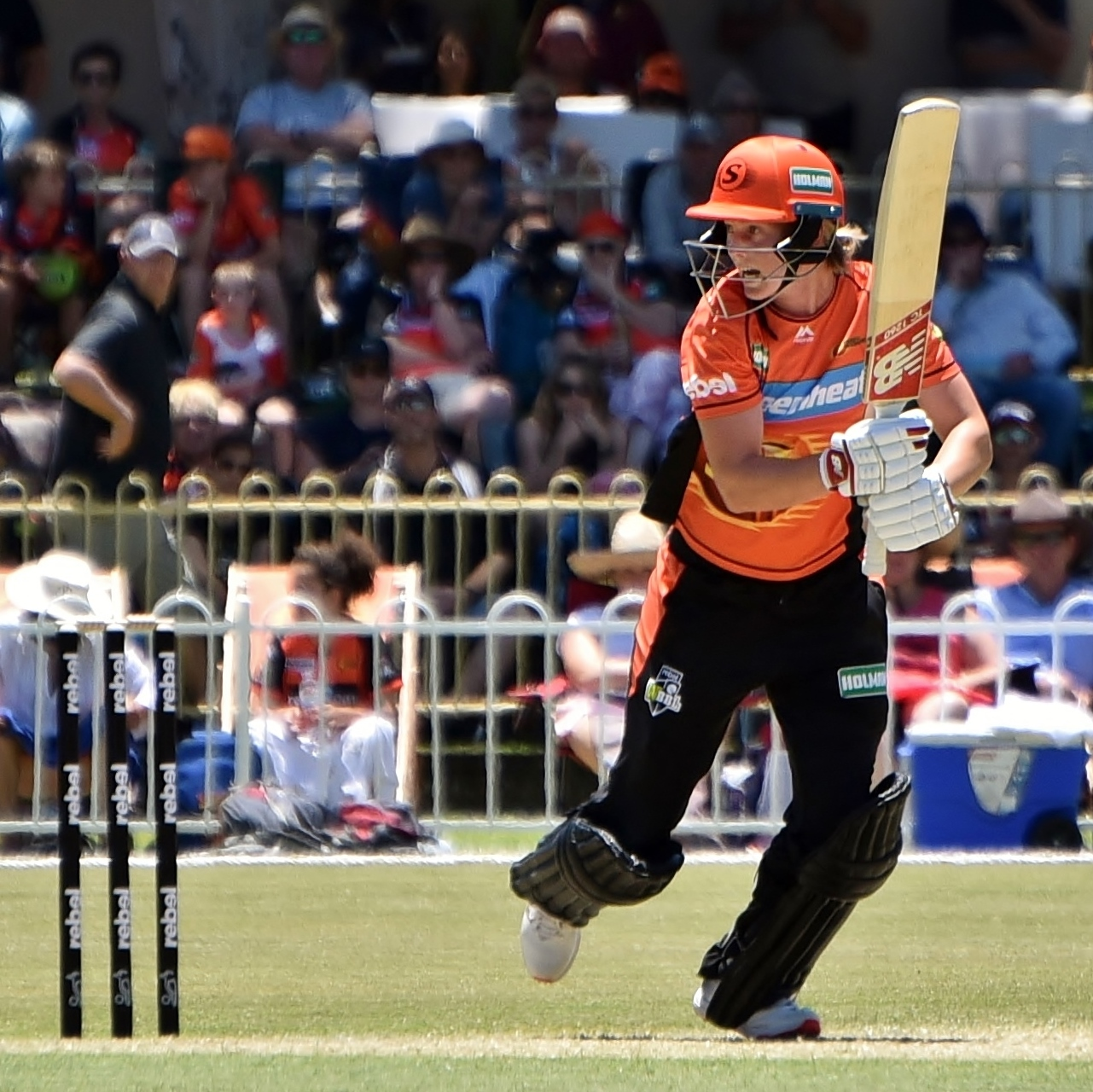
Meg Lanning

=== Individual awards ===
==== Men's awards ====
Men's Cricketer of the Year: (Australia) Mitchell Johnson; (South Africa) AB de Villiers; (Sri Lanka) Angelo Mathews; (Sri Lanka) Kumar Sangakkara	Men's Test Player of the Year: (Australia) Mitchell Johnson; (Sri Lanka) Angelo Mathews; (Sri Lanka) Kumar Sangakkara; (Australia) David Warner
Men's ODI Player of the Year: (South Africa) AB de Villiers; (South Africa) Quinton de Kock; (India) Virat Kohli; (South Africa) Dale Steyn	Men's Emerging Player of the Year: (England) Gary Ballance; (New Zealand) Corey Anderson; (New Zealand) James Neesham; (England) Ben Stokes
Men's Associate Player of the Year: (Scotland) Preston Mommsen; (Scotland) Calum MacLeod; (Afghanistan) Mohammad Nabi; (Afghanistan) Samiullah Shenwari

==== Women's awards ====
Women's ODI Player of the Year
- (England) Sarah Taylor
  - (England) Charlotte Edwards
  - (India) Mithali Raj
  - (Cricket West Indies) Stafanie Taylor
Women's T20I Player of the Year
- (Australia) Meg Lanning
  - (England) Charlotte Edwards
  - (India) Mithali Raj
  - (Cricket West Indies) Stafanie Taylor

==== Other awards ====
Umpire of the Year
- (England) Richard Kettleborough
Twenty20 International Performance of the Year
- (Australia) Aaron Finch, for scoring 156 runs off 63 deliveries against England at The Rose Bowl in Southampton on 29 August 2013
  - (England) Alex Hales
  - (Sri Lanka) Rangana Herath
Spirit of Cricket
- (England) Katherine Brunt, for recalling Marcia Letsoalo during the second Twenty20 International match against South Africa at the County Ground in Northampton on 3 September 2014
LG People's Choice Award
- (India) Bhuvneshwar Kumar

=== ICC Teams of the Year ===
ICC Men's Test Team of the Year

Angelo Mathews was selected as the captain of the Test Team of the Year, with AB de Villiers selected as the wicket-keeper, Other players are:

- (Australia) David Warner
- (New Zealand) Kane Williamson
- (Sri Lanka) Kumar Sangakkara
- (South Africa) AB de Villiers
- (England) Joe Root
- (Sri Lanka) Angelo Mathews
- (Australia) Mitchell Johnson
- (England) Stuart Broad
- (South Africa) Dale Steyn
- (Sri Lanka) Rangana Herath
- (New Zealand) Tim Southee
- (New Zealand) Ross Taylor (12th man)

ICC Men's ODI Team of the Year

For the fourth time in a row, MS Dhoni was selected as both captain and wicket-keeper of the ODI Team of the Year. Other players are:

- (Pakistan) Mohammad Hafeez
- (South Africa) Quinton de Kock
- (India) Virat Kohli
- (Australia) George Bailey
- (South Africa) AB de Villiers
- (India) MS Dhoni
- (Cricket West Indies) Dwayne Bravo
- (Australia) James Faulkner
- (South Africa) Dale Steyn
- (India) Mohammed Shami
- (Sri Lanka) Ajantha Mendis
- (India) Rohit Sharma (12th man)

== Selection Committee ==
Chaired by ICC Cricket Hall of Famer Anil Kumble, the ICC Selection Committee provided a long list of nominations to the 32 members of the voting academy to cast their votes in the individual player award categories. They also selected the ICC World XI Teams.

Selection Committee members:

- (India) Anil Kumble (chairman)
- (England) Jonathan Agnew
- (Sri Lanka) Russel Arnold
- (New Zealand) Stephen Fleming
- (Netherlands) Betty Timmer

== See also ==
- International Cricket Council
- ICC Awards
- Sir Garfield Sobers Trophy (Cricketer of the Year)
- ICC Test Player of the Year
- ICC ODI Player of the Year
- David Shepherd Trophy (Umpire of the Year)
- ICC Women's Cricketer of the Year
- ICC Test Team of the Year
- ICC ODI Team of the Year
