= 2004 ICC Awards =

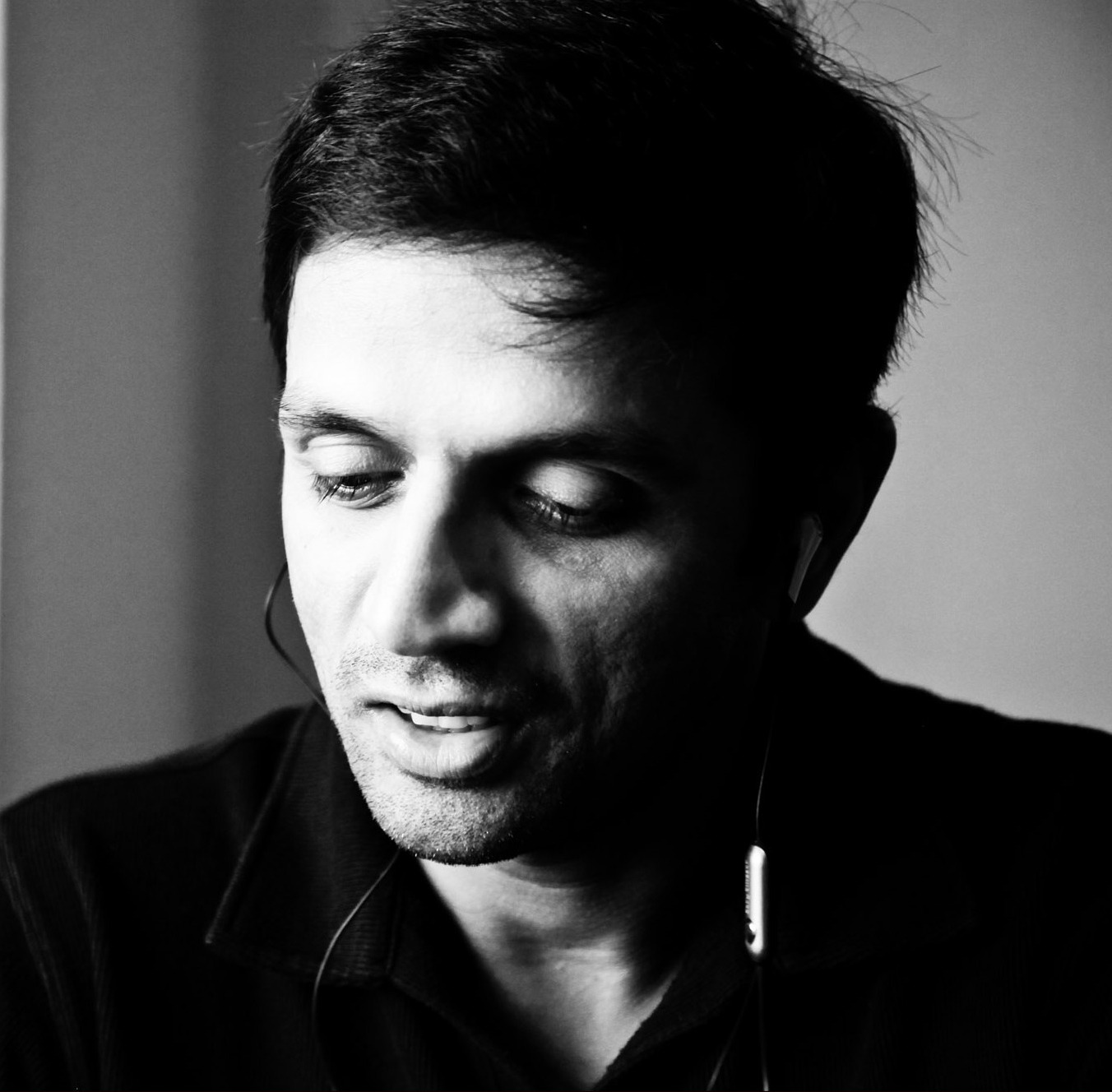
- 2004 Cricketer of the Year Rahul Dravid
- Date: 7 September 2004
- Presented by: ICC

Highlights
- Cricketer of the Year: (India) Rahul Dravid (1st award)
- Test Player of the Year: (India) Rahul Dravid (1st award)
- ODI Player of the Year: (England) Andrew Flintoff (1st award)
- Emerging Player of the Year: (India) Irfan Pathan
- Website: www.icc-cricket.com

The 2004 ICC Awards were held at Alexandra Palace in London, England on 7 September 2004. They were the inaugural episode and were aimed at recognizing the best individual and team performances of the previous year.

== Sponsors ==
In association with the Federation of International Cricketers' Associations (FICA), Hyundai were the presenting sponsors of the 2004 ICC Awards ceremony.

Other sponsors and partners were:

- Platinum sponsors: LG
- Broadcast partner: SET Max
- Trophy sponsors: Swarovski

== Selection Committee ==
Nominees were voted on by a 50-member academy of current and ex-players and officials from among players chosen by the ICC Selection Committee, chaired by ICC Cricket Hall of Famer Richie Benaud.

Selection Committee members:

- (Australia) Richie Benaud (chairman)
- (England) Ian Botham
- (India) Sunil Gavaskar
- (Cricket West Indies) Michael Holding
- (South Africa) Barry Richards

== Winners and nominees ==
The winners and nominees for various individual awards were:

=== Cricketer of the Year ===
Winner: Rahul Dravid (Ind)

Dravid's 2003–04 performance:
Tests: 9 matches, 1241 runs, 3 centuries, 4 half-centuries, 11 catches
ODIs: 30 matches, 960 runs, 1 century, 8 half-centuries, 15 catches, 4 stumpings

Nominees: Andrew Flintoff (Eng), Steve Harmison (Eng), Matthew Hayden (Aus), Jacques Kallis (SA), Brian Lara (WI), V.V.S. Laxman (Ind), Muttiah Muralitharan (SL), Ricky Ponting (Aus), Virender Sehwag (Ind)

=== Test Player of the Year ===
- Winner: Rahul Dravid (Ind)
- Nominees: Andrew Flintoff (Eng), Adam Gilchrist (Aus), Jason Gillespie (Aus), Steve Harmison (Eng), Matthew Hayden (Aus), Brian Lara (WI), V.V.S. Laxman (Ind), Jacques Kallis (SA), Muttiah Muralitharan (SL), Ricky Ponting (Aus), Virender Sehwag (Ind)

=== ODI Player of the Year ===
- Winner: Andrew Flintoff (Eng)
- Nominees: Stephen Fleming (NZ), Chris Gayle (WI), Adam Gilchrist (Aus), Jason Gillespie (Aus), Matthew Hayden (Aus), Jacques Kallis (SA), V.V.S. Laxman (Ind), Muttiah Muralitharan (SL), Shaun Pollock (SA), Ricky Ponting (Aus), Abdul Razzaq (Pak), Sachin Tendulkar (Ind), Heath Streak (Zim), Andrew Symonds (Aus), Chaminda Vaas (SL), Daniel Vettori (NZ)

=== Emerging Player of the Year ===
- Winner: Irfan Pathan (Ind)
- Nominees: Tino Best (WI), Michael Clarke (Aus), Imran Farhat (Pak), Umar Gul (Pak), Yasir Hameed (Pak), Hamish Marshall (NZ), Devon Smith (WI)

=== Umpire of the Year ===
- Winner: Simon Taufel (Aus)

=== Spirit of Cricket ===
- Winner: New Zealand

== ICC World XI Teams ==
=== ICC Test Team of the Year ===
Ricky Ponting was selected as the captain of the Test Team of the Year. In addition to a wicket-keeper, 9 other players were announced as follows:

- (Australia) Matthew Hayden
- (South Africa) Herschelle Gibbs
- (Australia) Ricky Ponting
- (India) Rahul Dravid
- (Cricket West Indies) Brian Lara
- (South Africa) Jacques Kallis
- (Australia) Adam Gilchrist (wicket-keeper)
- (Sri Lanka) Chaminda Vaas
- (Australia) Shane Warne
- (Australia) Jason Gillespie
- (England) Steve Harmison

=== ICC ODI Team of the Year ===
Ricky Ponting was also selected as the captain of the ODI Team of the Year. In addition to a wicket-keeper, 9 other players were announced as follows:

- (Australia) Adam Gilchrist (wicket-keeper)
- (India) Sachin Tendulkar
- (Cricket West Indies) Chris Gayle
- (Australia) Ricky Ponting
- (Cricket West Indies) Brian Lara
- (India) Virender Sehwag
- (South Africa) Jacques Kallis
- (England) Andrew Flintoff
- (South Africa) Shaun Pollock
- (Sri Lanka) Chaminda Vaas
- (Australia) Jason Gillespie

== See also ==
- International Cricket Council
- ICC Awards
- Sir Garfield Sobers Trophy (Cricketer of the Year)
- ICC Test Player of the Year
- ICC ODI Player of the Year
- David Shepherd Trophy (Umpire of the Year)
- ICC Women's Cricketer of the Year
- ICC Test Team of the Year
- ICC ODI Team of the Year
