= ICC Men's Emerging Cricketer of the Year =

ICC award for best men's emerging cricketer

ICC Award for Best Men's Emerging Cricketer of the Year
- Awarded for: Best Performance by an emerging player
- Presented by: ICC
- First award: 2004
- Final award: 2024
- Currently held by: (Sri Lanka) Kamindu Mendis
- Website: ICC Awards

The ICC Men's Emerging Cricketer of the Year is an annual award presented since 2004 by the International Cricket Council to the best young cricketer. It is one of the annual ICC Awards.

== Criteria ==
Players eligible for this award must be under 30 years of age at the start of the voting period and have played no more than 5 Tests and/or 10 ODIs before that date, but can only win it one time.

== Selection ==
The recipient of the annual award is selected by an "academy" of 56 individuals (expanded from 50 in 2004), including the current national team captains of the Test-playing nations (10), members of the elite panel of ICC umpires and referees (18), and certain prominent former players and cricket correspondents (28). In the event of a tie in the voting, the award is shared.

== List of Winners ==
| Year | Winner | Also Nominated |
|---|---|---|
| 2004 | (India) Irfan Pathan | (Cricket West Indies) Tino Best (Australia) Michael Clarke (Pakistan) Imran Farhat (Pakistan) Umar Gul (Pakistan) Yasir Hameed (New Zealand) Hamish Marshall (Cricket West Indies) Devon Smith |
| 2005 | (England) Kevin Pietersen | (Bangladesh) Aftab Ahmed (England) Ian Bell (India) Gautam Gambhir (India) Dinesh Karthik (Bangladesh) Manjural Islam Rana (South Africa) AB de Villiers |
| 2006 | (England) Ian Bell | (England) Monty Panesar (England) Alastair Cook (Cricket West Indies) Denesh Ramdin (Sri Lanka) Malinga Bandara (Pakistan) Mohammad Asif (Sri Lanka) Upul Tharanga (Bangladesh) Shahriar Nafees |
| 2007 | (Australia) Shaun Tait | (England) Ravi Bopara (Bangladesh) Shakib Al Hasan (Australia) Mitchell Johnson (Bangladesh) Mushfiqur Rahim (New Zealand) Ross Taylor (England) Chris Tremlett |
| 2008 | (Sri Lanka) Ajantha Mendis | (England) Stuart Broad (South Africa) Morné Morkel (India) Ishant Sharma |
| 2009 | (Australia) Peter Siddle | (Australia) Ben Hilfenhaus (England) Graham Onions (New Zealand) Jesse Ryder |
| 2010 | (England) Steven Finn | (Pakistan) Umar Akmal (Sri Lanka) Angelo Mathews (Australia) Tim Paine |
| 2011 | (Cricket West Indies) Devendra Bishoo | (Pakistan) Azhar Ali (Cricket West Indies) Darren Bravo (Pakistan) Wahab Riaz |
| 2012 | (Cricket West Indies) Sunil Narine | (New Zealand) Doug Bracewell (Sri Lanka) Dinesh Chandimal (Australia) James Pattinson |
| 2013 | (India) Cheteshwar Pujara | (New Zealand) Trent Boult (England) Joe Root (Australia) Mitchell Starc |
| 2014 | (England) Gary Ballance | (New Zealand) Corey Anderson (New Zealand) James Neesham (England) Ben Stokes |
| 2015 | (Australia) Josh Hazlewood | —N/a |
| 2016 | (Bangladesh) Mustafizur Rahman | —N/a |
| 2017 | (Pakistan) Hasan Ali | —N/a |
| 2018 | (India) Rishabh Pant | —N/a |
| 2019 | (Australia) Marnus Labuschagne | —N/a |
| 2021 | (South Africa) Janneman Malan | —N/a |
| 2022 | (South Africa) Marco Jansen | (Afghanistan) Ibrahim Zadran (New Zealand) Finn Allen (India) Arshdeep Singh |
| 2023 | (New Zealand) Rachin Ravindra | (South Africa) Gerald Coetzee (Sri Lanka) Dilshan Madushanka (India) Yashasvi Jaiswal |
| 2024 | (Sri Lanka) Kamindu Mendis | (Pakistan) Saim Ayub (England) Gus Atkinson (Cricket West Indies) Shamar Joseph |

== Wins by country ==
| Country | Players | Total |
|---|---|---|
| England | 4 | 4 |
| Australia | 4 | 4 |
| India | 3 | 3 |
| West Indies | 2 | 2 |
| South Africa | 2 | 2 |
| Sri Lanka | 2 | 2 |
| Bangladesh | 1 | 1 |
| New Zealand | 1 | 1 |
| Pakistan | 1 | 1 |

== See also ==
- ICC Awards
