= 2013 ICC Awards =

Cricket award ceremony

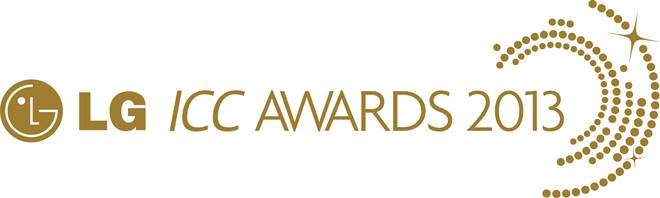
- Date: 14 December 2013
- Presented by: ICC

Highlights
- Cricketer of the Year: (Australia) Michael Clarke (1st award)
- Test Player of the Year: (Australia) Michael Clarke (1st award)
- ODI Player of the Year: (Sri Lanka) Kumar Sangakkara (2nd award)
- Emerging Player of the Year: (India) Cheteshwar Pujara
- Website: www.icc-cricket.com

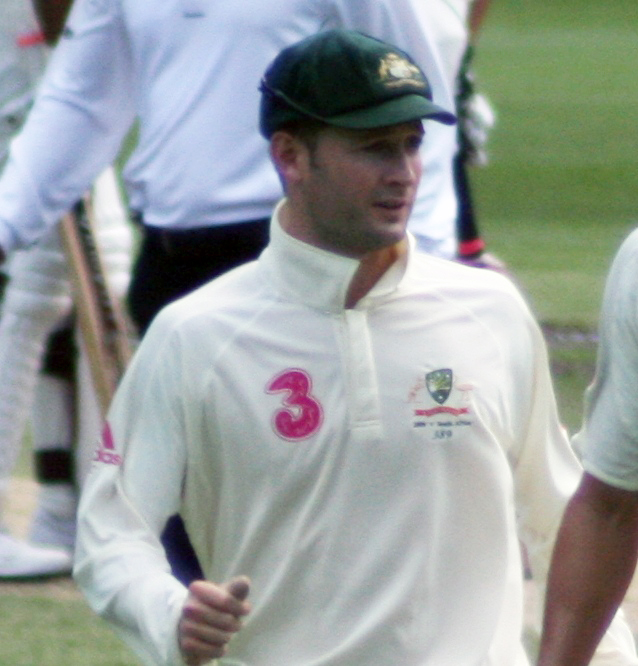
2013 Cricketer of the Year Michael Clarke.

The 2013 ICC Awards were broadcast in a special TV show which was aired on 14 December 2013. The ICC had been hosting ICC Awards since 2004, which were now into their tenth year. Previous events were held in London (2004, 2011), Sydney (2005), Mumbai (2006), Johannesburg (2007, 2009), Dubai (2008), Bangalore (2010) and Colombo (2012). The ICC awards the Sir Garfield Sobers Trophy to the Cricketer of the Year, which is considered to be the most prestigious award in world cricket.

== Selection Committee ==
Chaired by ICC Cricket Hall of Famer Anil Kumble, the ICC Selection Committee was charged with two main tasks. Using their experience, knowledge and appreciation of the game, they selected the ICC World XI Teams and provided a long list of nominations to the 32 members of the voting academy to cast their votes in the individual player award categories.

Selection Committee members:

- (India) Anil Kumble (chairman)
- (England) Alec Stewart
- (New Zealand) Catherine Campbell
- (Pakistan) Waqar Younis
- (South Africa) Graeme Pollock

== Award categories and winners ==
=== Cricketer of the Year ===
- (Australia) Michael Clarke

=== Test Player of the Year ===
- (Australia) Michael Clarke

=== ODI Player of the Year ===
- (Sri Lanka) Kumar Sangakkara

=== Twenty20 International Performance of the Year ===
- (Pakistan) Umar Gul, for taking 5/6 from 2.2 overs against South Africa at Centurion Park in Centurion on 3 March 2013

=== Emerging Player of the Year ===
- (India) Cheteshwar Pujara

=== Associate Player of the Year ===
- (Ireland) Kevin O'Brien

=== Umpire of the Year ===
- (England) Richard Kettleborough

=== Women's ODI Cricketer of the Year ===
- (New Zealand) Suzie Bates

=== Women's T20I Cricketer of the Year ===
- (England) Sarah Taylor

=== Spirit of Cricket ===
- (Sri Lanka) Mahela Jayawardene, for his honesty at a very crucial stage of the first Test match against New Zealand at Galle International Stadium in Galle on 18 November 2012

=== LG People's Choice Award ===
- (India) MS Dhoni

== ICC World XI Teams ==
=== ICC Test Team of the Year ===
Alastair Cook was selected as the captain of the Test Team of the Year, with MS Dhoni selected as the wicket-keeper. Other players are:

- (England) Alastair Cook
- (India) Cheteshwar Pujara
- (South Africa) Hashim Amla
- (Australia) Michael Clarke
- (Australia) Michael Hussey
- (South Africa) AB de Villiers
- (India) MS Dhoni
- (England) Graeme Swann
- (South Africa) Dale Steyn
- (England) James Anderson
- (South Africa) Vernon Philander
- (India) Ravichandran Ashwin (12th man)

=== ICC ODI Team of the Year ===
For the third time consecutively, MS Dhoni was selected as both captain and wicket-keeper of the ODI Team of the Year. Other players are:

- (Sri Lanka) Tillakaratne Dilshan
- (India) Shikhar Dhawan
- (South Africa) Hashim Amla
- (Sri Lanka) Kumar Sangakkara
- (South Africa) AB de Villiers
- (India) MS Dhoni
- (India) Ravindra Jadeja
- (Pakistan) Saeed Ajmal
- (Australia) Mitchell Starc
- (England) James Anderson
- (Sri Lanka) Lasith Malinga
- (New Zealand) Mitchell McClenaghan (12th man)

== Short lists ==
=== Cricketer of the Year ===
- (South Africa) Hashim Amla
- (England) James Anderson
- (Australia) Michael Clarke
- (England) Alastair Cook
- (India) MS Dhoni
- (Sri Lanka) Kumar Sangakkara

=== Test Player of the Year ===
- (South Africa) Hashim Amla
- (England) James Anderson
- (India) Ravichandran Ashwin
- (Australia) Michael Clarke
- (India) Cheteshwar Pujara
- (South Africa) Dale Steyn

=== ODI Player of the Year ===
- (Pakistan) Saeed Ajmal
- (India) Shikhar Dhawan
- (India) MS Dhoni
- (Pakistan) Misbah-ul-Haq
- (India) Ravindra Jadeja
- (Sri Lanka) Kumar Sangakkara

=== Twenty20 International Performance of the Year ===
- (Pakistan) Umar Gul
- (New Zealand) Martin Guptill
- (New Zealand) Brendon McCullum
- (Sri Lanka) Ajantha Mendis

=== Emerging Player of the Year ===
- (New Zealand) Trent Boult
- (India) Cheteshwar Pujara
- (England) Joe Root
- (Australia) Mitchell Starc

=== Associate Player of the Year ===
- (Ireland) Kevin O'Brien
- (Scotland) Kyle Coetzer
- (Ireland) Ed Joyce
- (Afghanistan) Nawroz Mangal

=== Umpire of the Year ===
- (Pakistan) Aleem Dar
- (England) Steve Davis
- (Sri Lanka) Kumar Dharmasena
- (South Africa) Marais Erasmus
- (England) Ian Gould
- (New Zealand) Tony Hill
- (England) Richard Illingworth
- (England) Richard Kettleborough
- (England) Nigel Llong
- (Australia) Bruce Oxenford
- (Australia) Paul Reiffel
- (Australia) Rod Tucker

=== Women's ODI Cricketer of the Year ===
- (New Zealand) Suzie Bates
- (England) Charlotte Edwards
- (Australia) Meg Lanning
- (South Africa) Dane van Niekerk
- (England) Anya Shrubsole
- (Cricket West Indies) Stafanie Taylor

=== Women's T20I Cricketer of the Year ===
- (New Zealand) Suzie Bates
- (Cricket West Indies) Shanel Daley
- (Cricket West Indies) Deandra Dottin
- (Australia) Meg Lanning
- (England) Sarah Taylor
- (Cricket West Indies) Stafanie Taylor

== See also ==
- International Cricket Council
- ICC Awards
- Sir Garfield Sobers Trophy (Cricketer of the Year)
- ICC Test Player of the Year
- ICC ODI Player of the Year
- David Shepherd Trophy (Umpire of the Year)
- ICC Women's Cricketer of the Year
- ICC Test Team of the Year
- ICC ODI Team of the Year
