= 2012 ICC Awards =

Cricket awards ceremony in Colombo, Sri Lanka

- Date: 15 September 2012
- Presented by: ICC

Highlights
- Cricketer of the Year: (Sri Lanka) Kumar Sangakkara (1st award)
- Test Player of the Year: (Sri Lanka) Kumar Sangakkara (1st award)
- ODI Player of the Year: (India) Virat Kohli (1st award)
- Emerging Player of the Year: (Cricket West Indies) Sunil Narine
- Website: www.icc-cricket.com

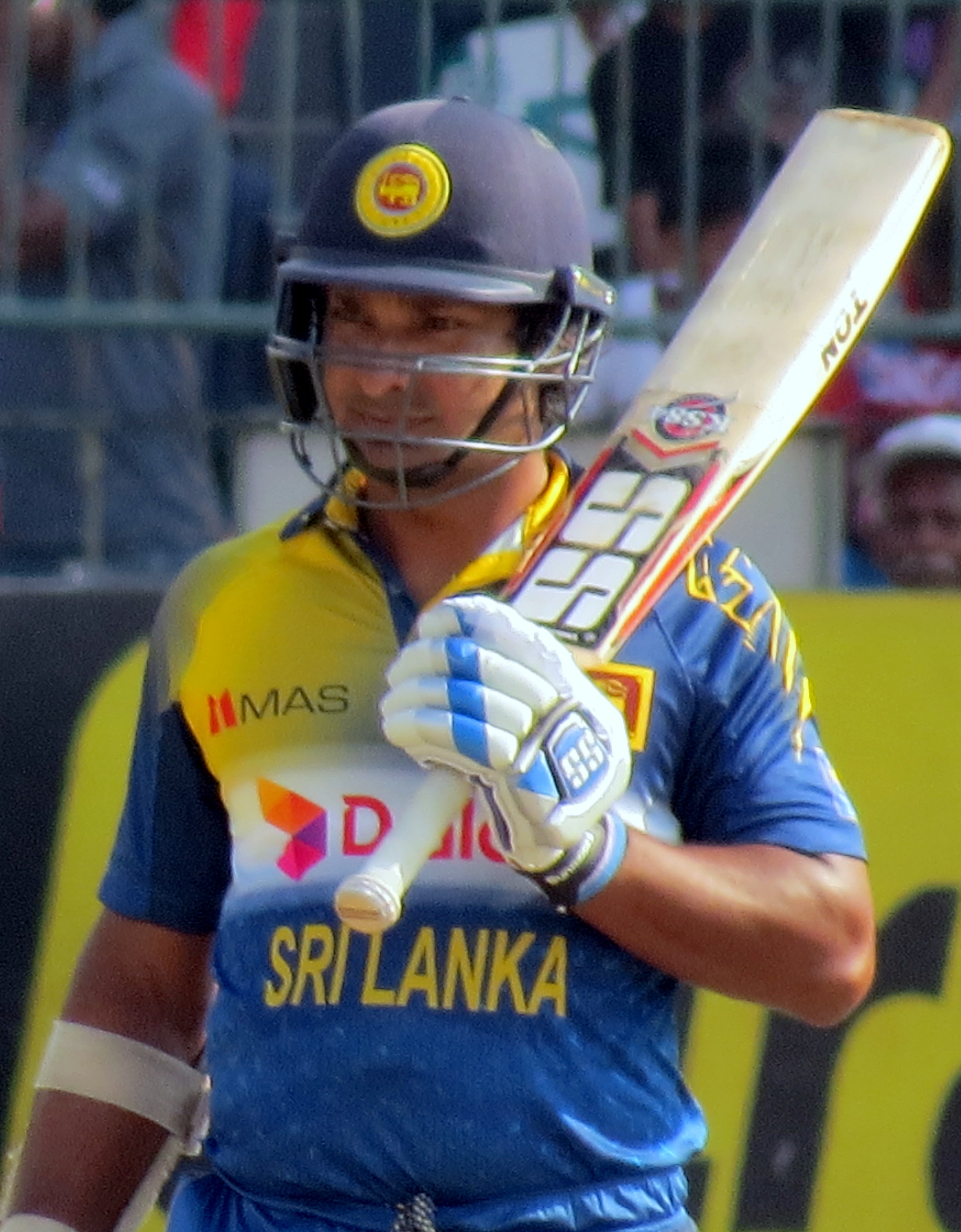
2012 Cricketer of the Year Kumar Sangakkara.

The 2012 ICC Awards were held on 15 September 2012 in Colombo, Sri Lanka. The ICC had been hosting ICC Awards since 2004, which were now into their ninth year. Previous events were held in London (2004, 2011), Sydney (2005), Mumbai (2006), Johannesburg (2007, 2009), Dubai (2008) and Bangalore (2010). The ICC awards the Sir Garfield Sobers Trophy to the Cricketer of the Year, which is considered to be the most prestigious award in world cricket.

== Selection Committee ==
Chaired by ICC Cricket Hall of Famer Clive Lloyd, the ICC Selection Committee was charged with two main tasks. Using their experience, knowledge and appreciation of the game, they selected the ICC World XI Teams and provided a long list of nominations to the 32 members of the voting academy to cast their votes in the individual player award categories.

Selection Committee members:

- (Cricket West Indies) Clive Lloyd (chairman)
- (Sri Lanka) Marvan Atapattu
- (Australia) Tom Moody
- (Cricket West Indies) Carl Hooper
- (England) Clare Connor

== Award categories and winners ==
=== Cricketer of the Year ===
- (Sri Lanka) Kumar Sangakkara

=== Test Player of the Year ===
- (Sri Lanka) Kumar Sangakkara

=== ODI Player of the Year ===
- (India) Virat Kohli

=== Twenty20 International Performance of the Year ===
- (South Africa) Richard Levi, for scoring 117 not out off 51 deliveries against New Zealand at Seddon Park in Hamilton on 19 February 2012

=== Emerging Player of the Year ===
- (Cricket West Indies) Sunil Narine

=== Associate Player of the Year ===
- (Ireland) George Dockrell

=== Umpire of the Year ===
- (Sri Lanka) Kumar Dharmasena

=== Women's ODI Cricketer of the Year ===
- (Cricket West Indies) Stafanie Taylor

=== Women's T20I Cricketer of the Year ===
- (England) Sarah Taylor

=== Spirit of Cricket ===
- (New Zealand) Daniel Vettori, for refraining from appealing during the only Test match against Zimbabwe at Queens Sports Club in Bulawayo on 5 November 2011

=== LG People's Choice Award ===
- (Sri Lanka) Kumar Sangakkara

== ICC World XI Teams ==
=== ICC Test Team of the Year ===
Michael Clarke was selected as the captain of the Test Team of the Year, with Matt Prior selected as the wicket-keeper. Other players are:

- (England) Alastair Cook
- (South Africa) Hashim Amla
- (Sri Lanka) Kumar Sangakkara
- (South Africa) Jacques Kallis
- (Australia) Michael Clarke
- (Cricket West Indies) Shivnarine Chanderpaul
- (England) Matt Prior
- (England) Stuart Broad
- (Pakistan) Saeed Ajmal
- (South Africa) Vernon Philander
- (South Africa) Dale Steyn
- (South Africa) AB de Villiers (12th man)

=== ICC ODI Team of the Year ===
For the third time in his career, MS Dhoni was selected as both captain and wicket-keeper of the ODI Team of the Year. Other players are:

- (India) Gautam Gambhir
- (England) Alastair Cook
- (Sri Lanka) Kumar Sangakkara
- (India) Virat Kohli
- (India) MS Dhoni
- (Australia) Michael Clarke
- (Pakistan) Shahid Afridi
- (South Africa) Morné Morkel
- (England) Steven Finn
- (Sri Lanka) Lasith Malinga
- (Pakistan) Saeed Ajmal
- (Australia) Shane Watson (12th man)

== Short lists ==
The short lists for the 2012 LG ICC Awards were announced by the ICC on 30 August 2012. They are the following:

=== Cricketer of the Year ===
- (South Africa) Hashim Amla
- (Australia) Michael Clarke
- (South Africa) Vernon Philander
- (Sri Lanka) Kumar Sangakkara

=== Test Player of the Year ===
- (South Africa) Hashim Amla
- (Australia) Michael Clarke
- (South Africa) Vernon Philander
- (Sri Lanka) Kumar Sangakkara

=== ODI Player of the Year ===
- (India) MS Dhoni
- (India) Virat Kohli
- (Sri Lanka) Lasith Malinga
- (Sri Lanka) Kumar Sangakkara

=== Twenty20 International Performance of the Year ===
- (Sri Lanka) Tillakaratne Dilshan
- (Cricket West Indies) Chris Gayle
- (South Africa) Richard Levi
- (Sri Lanka) Ajantha Mendis

=== Emerging Player of the Year ===
- (New Zealand) Doug Bracewell
- (Sri Lanka) Dinesh Chandimal
- (Cricket West Indies) Sunil Narine
- (Australia) James Pattinson

=== Associate Player of the Year ===
- (Ireland) Kevin O'Brien
- (Ireland) George Dockrell
- (Ireland) Ed Joyce
- (Ireland) Paul Stirling
- (Afghanistan) Dawlat Zadran

=== Umpire of the Year ===
- (New Zealand) Billy Bowden
- (Pakistan) Aleem Dar
- (Sri Lanka) Kumar Dharmasena
- (England) Richard Kettleborough
- (Australia) Simon Taufel
- (Australia) Rod Tucker

=== Women's ODI Cricketer of the Year ===
- (England) Lydia Greenway
- (Cricket West Indies) Anisa Mohammed
- (England) Sarah Taylor
- (Cricket West Indies) Stafanie Taylor

=== Women's T20I Cricketer of the Year ===
- (Australia) Alyssa Healy
- (Australia) Lisa Sthalekar
- (England) Sarah Taylor
- (Cricket West Indies) Stafanie Taylor

=== Spirit of Cricket ===
- (Pakistan) Mohammad Hafeez
- (South Africa) Jacques Kallis
- (New Zealand) Daniel Vettori
- (South Africa) AB de Villiers

=== LG People's Choice Award ===
- (England) James Anderson
- (South Africa) Jacques Kallis
- (South Africa) Vernon Philander
- (Sri Lanka) Kumar Sangakkara
- (India) Sachin Tendulkar

== Nominations ==
The following are the nominations for the 2012 LG ICC Awards:

=== Cricketer of the Year ===
- (Pakistan) Saeed Ajmal
- (South Africa) Hashim Amla
- (England) Stuart Broad
- (Australia) Michael Clarke
- (England) Alastair Cook
- (India) Virat Kohli
- (South Africa) Vernon Philander
- (Sri Lanka) Kumar Sangakkara
- (Cricket West Indies) Stafanie Taylor

=== Test Player of the Year ===
- (Pakistan) Saeed Ajmal
- (South Africa) Hashim Amla
- (England) Stuart Broad
- (Cricket West Indies) Shivnarine Chanderpaul
- (Australia) Michael Clarke
- (England) Alastair Cook
- (South Africa) Jacques Kallis
- (South Africa) Vernon Philander
- (England) Matt Prior
- (Cricket West Indies) Marlon Samuels
- (Sri Lanka) Kumar Sangakkara
- (South Africa) Dale Steyn
- (South Africa) AB de Villiers

=== ODI Player of the Year ===
- (Pakistan) Shahid Afridi
- (Pakistan) Saeed Ajmal
- (Australia) Michael Clarke
- (England) Alastair Cook
- (India) MS Dhoni
- (England) Steven Finn
- (India) Gautam Gambhir
- (Bangladesh) Shakib Al Hasan
- (India) Virat Kohli
- (Sri Lanka) Lasith Malinga
- (New Zealand) Brendon McCullum
- (South Africa) Morné Morkel
- (Cricket West Indies) Sunil Narine
- (Sri Lanka) Kumar Sangakkara
- (Zimbabwe) Brendan Taylor
- (Australia) Shane Watson

=== Twenty20 International Performance of the Year ===
- (England) Ravi Bopara
- (Sri Lanka) Tillakaratne Dilshan
- (Cricket West Indies) Chris Gayle
- (New Zealand) Martin Guptill
- (Pakistan) Mohammad Hafeez
- (England) Alex Hales
- (South Africa) Richard Levi
- (New Zealand) Brendon McCullum
- (Sri Lanka) Ajantha Mendis
- (Cricket West Indies) Sunil Narine
- (Bangladesh) Elias Sunny

=== Emerging Player of the Year ===
- (New Zealand) Trent Boult
- (New Zealand) Doug Bracewell
- (Sri Lanka) Dinesh Chandimal
- (Australia) Pat Cummins
- (Bangladesh) Nasir Hossain
- (Pakistan) Junaid Khan
- (Australia) Nathan Lyon
- (Zimbabwe) Tino Mawoyo
- (Cricket West Indies) Sunil Narine
- (Australia) James Pattinson
- (Sri Lanka) Lahiru Thirimanne
- (Australia) Matthew Wade

=== Associate Player of the Year ===
- (United Arab Emirates) Shaiman Anwar
- (Netherlands) Peter Borren
- (Ireland) Kevin O'Brien
- (Ireland) George Dockrell
- (Ireland) Trent Johnston
- (Ireland) Ed Joyce
- (Ireland) John Mooney
- (Canada) Hiral Patel
- (Ireland) Paul Stirling
- (Afghanistan) Dawlat Zadran

=== Umpire of the Year ===
- (New Zealand) Billy Bowden
- (Pakistan) Aleem Dar
- (England) Steve Davis
- (Sri Lanka) Kumar Dharmasena
- (Cricket West Indies) Billy Doctrove
- (South Africa) Marais Erasmus
- (England) Ian Gould
- (New Zealand) Tony Hill
- (England) Richard Kettleborough
- (England) Nigel Llong
- (Pakistan) Asad Rauf
- (Australia) Simon Taufel
- (Australia) Rod Tucker

=== Women's ODI Cricketer of the Year ===
- (Australia) Jess Duffin
- (Cricket West Indies) Shanel Daley
- (England) Lydia Greenway
- (Cricket West Indies) Anisa Mohammed
- (India) Mithali Raj
- (England) Sarah Taylor
- (Cricket West Indies) Stafanie Taylor

=== Women's T20I Cricketer of the Year ===
- (Australia) Jess Duffin
- (Cricket West Indies) Shanel Daley
- (Australia) Alyssa Healy
- (Cricket West Indies) Anisa Mohammed
- (India) Mithali Raj
- (Australia) Lisa Sthalekar
- (England) Sarah Taylor
- (Cricket West Indies) Stafanie Taylor

=== Spirit of Cricket ===
- (Pakistan) Mohammad Hafeez
- (South Africa) Jacques Kallis
- (Cricket West Indies) Kieron Pollard
- (New Zealand) Daniel Vettori
- (South Africa) AB de Villiers

== See also ==
- International Cricket Council
- ICC Awards
- Sir Garfield Sobers Trophy (Cricketer of the Year)
- ICC Test Player of the Year
- ICC ODI Player of the Year
- David Shepherd Trophy (Umpire of the Year)
- ICC Women's Cricketer of the Year
- ICC Test Team of the Year
- ICC ODI Team of the Year
