= 2011 ICC Awards =

Cricket award ceremony

- Date: 12 September 2011
- Presented by: ICC

Highlights
- Cricketer of the Year: (England) Jonathan Trott (1st award)
- Test Player of the Year: (England) Alastair Cook (1st award)
- ODI Player of the Year: (Sri Lanka) Kumar Sangakkara (1st award)
- Emerging Player of the Year: (Cricket West Indies) Devendra Bishoo
- Website: www.icc-cricket.com

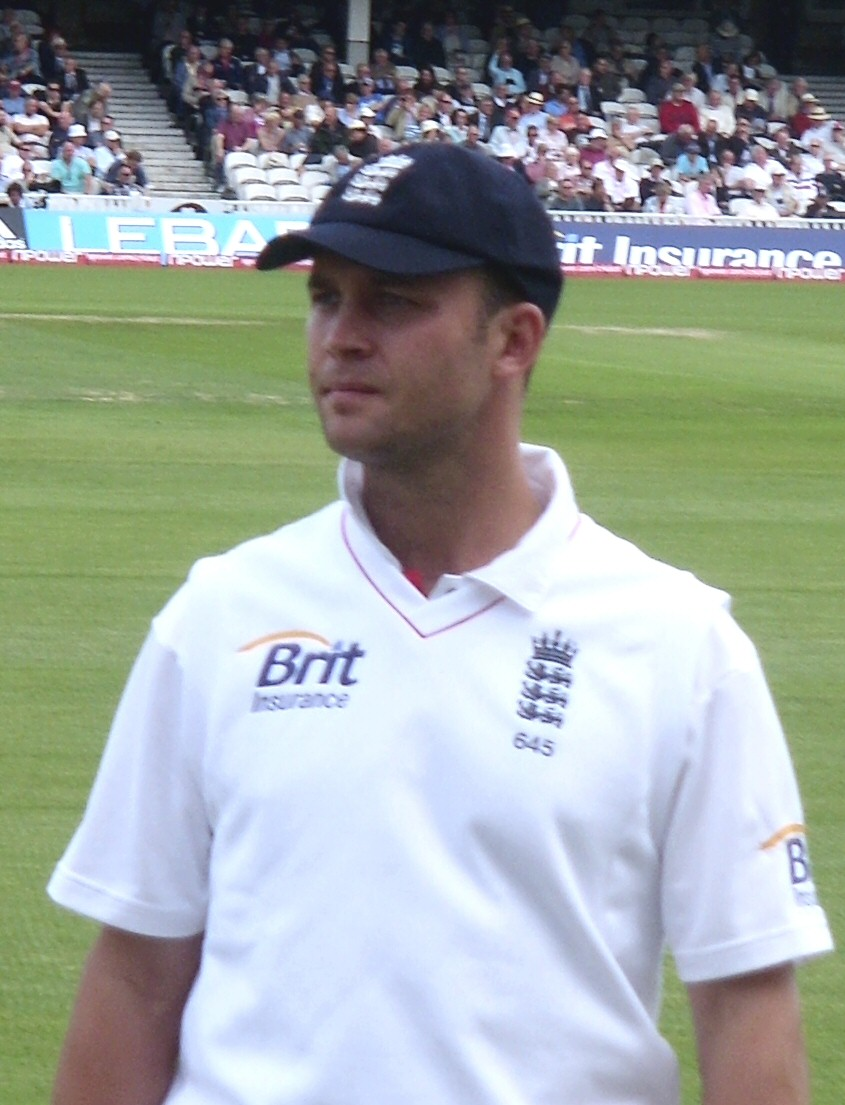
2011 Cricketer of the Year Jonathan Trott.

The 2011 ICC Awards were held on 12 September 2011 in London, England. They were presented at a grand ceremony in association with the Federation of International Cricketers' Associations (FICA). The ICC had been hosting ICC Awards since 2004, which were now into their eighth year. Previous events were held in London (2004), Sydney (2005), Mumbai (2006), Johannesburg (2007, 2009), Dubai (2008) and Bangalore (2010). The ICC awards the Sir Garfield Sobers Trophy to the Cricketer of the Year, which is considered to be the most prestigious award in world cricket.

== Selection Committee ==
Chaired by ICC Cricket Hall of Famer Clive Lloyd, the ICC Selection Committee was charged with two main tasks. Using their experience, knowledge and appreciation of the game, they selected the ICC World XI Teams and provided a long list of nominations to the 25 members of the voting academy to cast their votes in the individual player award categories.

Selection Committee members:

- (Cricket West Indies) Clive Lloyd (chairman)
- (Pakistan) Zaheer Abbas
- (England) Mike Gatting
- (South Africa) Paul Adams
- (New Zealand) Danny Morrison

== Award categories and winners ==
=== Cricketer of the Year ===
- (England) Jonathan Trott

=== Test Player of the Year ===
- (England) Alastair Cook

=== ODI Player of the Year ===
- (Sri Lanka) Kumar Sangakkara

=== Twenty20 International Performance of the Year ===
- (New Zealand) Tim Southee, for taking 5/18 with one maiden from his allotted four overs against Pakistan at Eden Park in Auckland on 26 December 2010

=== Emerging Player of the Year ===
- (Cricket West Indies) Devendra Bishoo

=== Associate Player of the Year ===
- (Netherlands) Ryan ten Doeschate

=== Umpire of the Year ===
- (Pakistan) Aleem Dar

=== Women's Cricketer of the Year ===
- (Cricket West Indies) Stafanie Taylor

=== Spirit of Cricket ===
- (India) MS Dhoni, for recalling Ian Bell during the second Test match against England at Trent Bridge in Nottingham on 31 July 2011

=== LG People's Choice Award ===
- (Sri Lanka) Kumar Sangakkara

== ICC World XI Teams ==
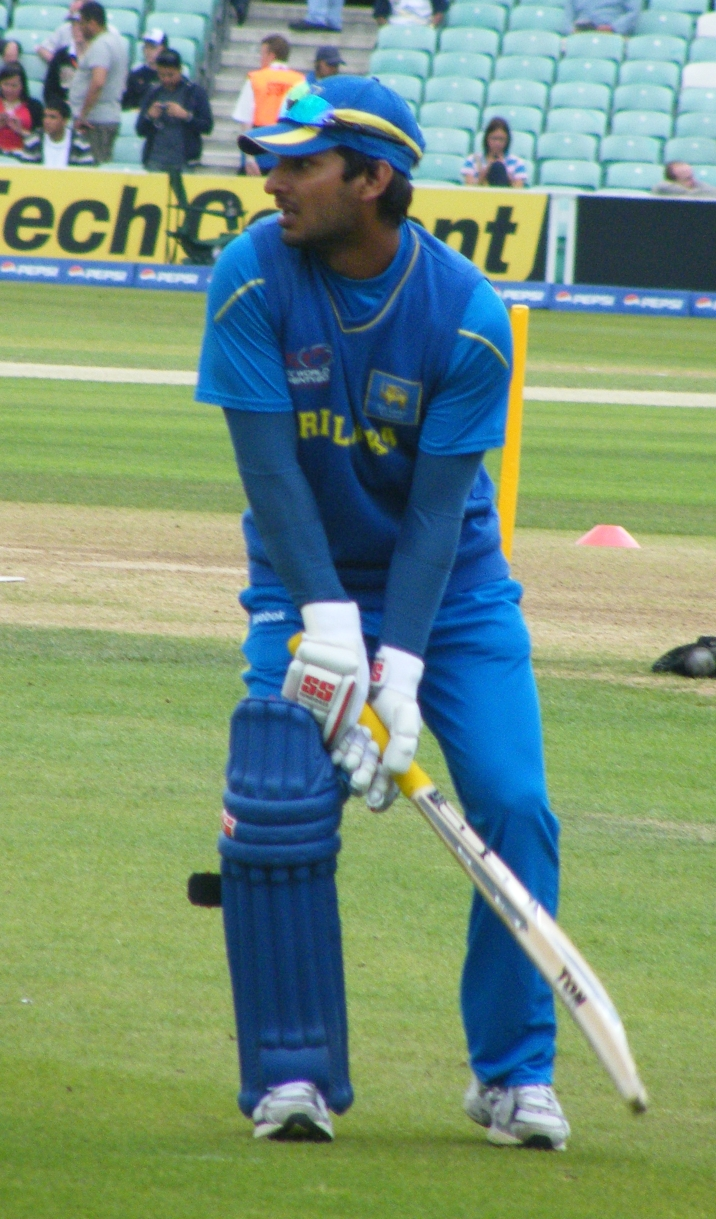
Kumar Sangakkara was selected as both the captain and the wicket-keeper of the ICC Test Team of the Year.

=== ICC Test Team of the Year ===
Kumar Sangakkara was selected as both captain and wicket-keeper of the Test Team of the Year. Other players are:

- (England) Alastair Cook
- (South Africa) Hashim Amla
- (England) Jonathan Trott
- (India) Sachin Tendulkar
- (Sri Lanka) Kumar Sangakkara
- (South Africa) AB de Villiers
- (South Africa) Jacques Kallis
- (England) Stuart Broad
- (England) Graeme Swann
- (South Africa) Dale Steyn
- (England) James Anderson
- (India) Zaheer Khan (12th man)

=== ICC ODI Team of the Year ===
MS Dhoni was selected as both captain and wicket-keeper of the ODI Team of the Year for the second time. Other players are:

- (Sri Lanka) Tillakaratne Dilshan
- (India) Virender Sehwag
- (Sri Lanka) Kumar Sangakkara
- (South Africa) AB de Villiers
- (Australia) Shane Watson
- (India) Yuvraj Singh
- (India) MS Dhoni
- (England) Graeme Swann
- (Pakistan) Umar Gul
- (South Africa) Dale Steyn
- (India) Zaheer Khan
- (Sri Lanka) Lasith Malinga (12th man)

== Short lists ==
The short lists for the 2011 LG ICC Awards were announced by the ICC on 26 August 2011. They are the following:

=== Cricketer of the Year ===
- (South Africa) Hashim Amla
- (England) Alastair Cook
- (India) Sachin Tendulkar
- (England) Jonathan Trott

=== Test Player of the Year ===
- (England) James Anderson
- (England) Alastair Cook
- (South Africa) Jacques Kallis
- (England) Jonathan Trott

=== ODI Player of the Year ===
- (South Africa) Hashim Amla
- (India) Gautam Gambhir
- (Sri Lanka) Kumar Sangakkara
- (Australia) Shane Watson

=== Twenty20 International Performance of the Year ===
- (England) Tim Bresnan
- (South Africa) JP Duminy
- (New Zealand) Tim Southee
- (Australia) Shane Watson

=== Emerging Player of the Year ===
- (Pakistan) Azhar Ali
- (Cricket West Indies) Devendra Bishoo
- (Cricket West Indies) Darren Bravo
- (Pakistan) Wahab Riaz

=== Associate Player of the Year ===
- (Netherlands) Ryan ten Doeschate
- (Afghanistan) Hamid Hassan
- (Ireland) Kevin O'Brien
- (Ireland) Paul Stirling

=== Umpire of the Year ===
- (Pakistan) Aleem Dar
- (England) Steve Davis
- (England) Ian Gould
- (Australia) Simon Taufel

=== Women's Cricketer of the Year ===
- (England) Charlotte Edwards
- (England) Lydia Greenway
- (Australia) Shelley Nitschke
- (Cricket West Indies) Stafanie Taylor

=== Spirit of Cricket ===
- (India) MS Dhoni
- (South Africa) Jacques Kallis

=== LG People's Choice Award ===
- (South Africa) Hashim Amla
- (India) MS Dhoni
- (Cricket West Indies) Chris Gayle
- (Sri Lanka) Kumar Sangakkara
- (England) Jonathan Trott

== Nominations ==
The following are the nominations for the 2011 LG ICC Awards:

=== Cricketer of the Year ===
- (South Africa) Hashim Amla
- (England) James Anderson
- (England) Ian Bell
- (England) Stuart Broad
- (England) Alastair Cook
- (India) Rahul Dravid
- (South Africa) Jacques Kallis
- (India) Zaheer Khan
- (Sri Lanka) Kumar Sangakkara
- (England) Andrew Strauss
- (England) Graeme Swann
- (India) Sachin Tendulkar
- (England) Chris Tremlett
- (England) Jonathan Trott
- (South Africa) AB de Villiers
- (Australia) Shane Watson

=== Test Player of the Year ===
- (South Africa) Hashim Amla
- (England) James Anderson
- (England) Ian Bell
- (England) Stuart Broad
- (England) Alastair Cook
- (India) Rahul Dravid
- (South Africa) Jacques Kallis
- (India) Zaheer Khan
- (Pakistan) Misbah-ul-Haq
- (England) Kevin Pietersen
- (India) Ishant Sharma
- (India) Harbhajan Singh
- (South Africa) Dale Steyn
- (England) Graeme Swann
- (India) Sachin Tendulkar
- (England) Chris Tremlett
- (England) Jonathan Trott
- (South Africa) AB de Villiers
- (Australia) Shane Watson

=== ODI Player of the Year ===
- (South Africa) Hashim Amla
- (Australia) Michael Clarke
- (India) MS Dhoni
- (India) Gautam Gambhir
- (Pakistan) Mohammad Hafeez
- (Sri Lanka) Mahela Jayawardene
- (India) Zaheer Khan
- (India) Virat Kohli
- (Sri Lanka) Lasith Malinga
- (India) Munaf Patel
- (Pakistan) Saeed Ajmal
- (Bangladesh) Shakib Al Hasan
- (Sri Lanka) Kumar Sangakkara
- (India) Virender Sehwag
- (India) Yuvraj Singh
- (New Zealand) Tim Southee
- (South Africa) Dale Steyn
- (England) Graeme Swann
- (England) Jonathan Trott
- (South Africa) AB de Villiers
- (Australia) Shane Watson

=== Twenty20 International Performance of the Year ===
- (England) Tim Bresnan
- (Zimbabwe) Chamu Chibhabha
- (South Africa) JP Duminy
- (South Africa) Shandre Fritz
- (South Africa) Graeme Smith
- (New Zealand) Tim Southee
- (Australia) Shane Watson

=== Emerging Player of the Year ===
- (Pakistan) Adnan Akmal
- (Pakistan) Azhar Ali
- (New Zealand) Hamish Bennett
- (Cricket West Indies) Devendra Bishoo
- (Cricket West Indies) Darren Bravo
- (Cricket West Indies) Kirk Edwards
- (South Africa) Colin Ingram
- (India) Abhinav Mukund
- (Pakistan) Wahab Riaz
- (New Zealand) Kane Williamson

=== Associate Player of the Year ===
- (United Arab Emirates) Saqib Ali
- (Canada) Ashish Bagai
- (Ireland) George Dockrell
- (Netherlands) Ryan ten Doeschate
- (Afghanistan) Hamid Hassan
- (Afghanistan) Nawroz Mangal
- (Ireland) John Mooney
- (Ireland) Kevin O'Brien
- (Afghanistan) Mohammad Shahzad
- (Ireland) Paul Stirling
- (Ireland) Andrew White
- (Ireland) Gary Wilson

=== Umpire of the Year ===
- (New Zealand) Billy Bowden
- (Pakistan) Aleem Dar
- (England) Steve Davis
- (Sri Lanka) Kumar Dharmasena
- (Cricket West Indies) Billy Doctrove
- (South Africa) Marais Erasmus
- (England) Ian Gould
- (New Zealand) Tony Hill
- (England) Richard Kettleborough
- (Pakistan) Asad Rauf
- (Australia) Simon Taufel
- (Australia) Rod Tucker

=== Women's Cricketer of the Year ===
- (South Africa) Cri-Zelda Brits
- (Australia) Sarah Cady
- (Australia) Jess Duffin
- (England) Charlotte Edwards
- (South Africa) Shandre Fritz
- (India) Jhulan Goswami
- (England) Lydia Greenway
- (Pakistan) Bismah Maroof
- (England) Laura Marsh
- (New Zealand) Sara McGlashan
- (Cricket West Indies) Anisa Mohammed
- (Australia) Shelley Nitschke
- (Australia) Leah Poulton
- (India) Poonam Raut
- (Cricket West Indies) Stafanie Taylor

== Development Awards ==
| Award | Country | Additional notes |
|---|---|---|
| Best Overall Cricket Development Programme | Ireland | |
| Best Women's Cricket Initiative | Scotland | |
| Best Junior Participation Initiative | Papua New Guinea | |
| Best Cricket Promotion and Marketing Programme | Canada | For their new website and groundbreaking work in live streaming and webcasts of matches |
| Best Spirit of Cricket Initiative | Japan | Awarded for 'Cricket for Smiles' project as a reaction to Tōhoku earthquake and tsunami |
| Photo of the Year | Brunei | Taken during an introductory cricket session at Girl's High School at Brunei–Muara District. The school created their own team. |
| Volunteer of the Year | Kenya | Awarded to Aliya Bauer for her dedicated work with Maasai Warriors |
| Lifetime Service Award | Oman | Awarded to Kanaksi Khimji |

The national cricket boards of all winners won $2,000 each in cricket equipment grants.

== See also ==
- International Cricket Council
- ICC Awards
- Sir Garfield Sobers Trophy (Cricketer of the Year)
- ICC Test Player of the Year
- ICC ODI Player of the Year
- David Shepherd Trophy (Umpire of the Year)
- ICC Women's Cricketer of the Year
- ICC Test Team of the Year
- ICC ODI Team of the Year
