= ICC Men's Test Team of the Year =

International cricket annual award

The ICC Men's Test Team of the Year is an honour awarded each year by the International Cricket Council. It recognises the top cricket players from around the world in the Test format of the game. The team does not actually compete, but exists solely as an honorary entity.

== ICC Men's Test Team of Year ==
=== Winners ===
Players marked bold won the ICC Men's Test Cricketer of the Year in that respective year:

Year	No. 1	No. 2	No. 3	No. 4	No. 5	No. 6	No. 7	No. 8	No. 9	No. 10	No. 11	12th man
2004	(Australia) Matthew Hayden	(South Africa) Herschelle Gibbs	(Australia) Ricky Ponting (c)	(India) Rahul Dravid	(Cricket West Indies) Brian Lara	(South Africa) Jacques Kallis	(Australia) Adam Gilchrist (wk)	(Sri Lanka) Chaminda Vaas	(Australia) Shane Warne	(Australia) Jason Gillespie	(England) Steve Harmison	
2005	(India) Virender Sehwag	(South Africa) Graeme Smith	(Australia) Ricky Ponting (c)	(South Africa) Jacques Kallis	(Cricket West Indies) Brian Lara	(Pakistan) Inzamam-ul-Haq	(England) Andrew Flintoff	(Australia) Adam Gilchrist (wk)	(Australia) Shane Warne	(Sri Lanka) Chaminda Vaas	(Australia) Glenn McGrath	(India) Anil Kumble
2006	(Australia) Matthew Hayden	(Australia) Michael Hussey	(Australia) Ricky Ponting	(India) Rahul Dravid (c)	(Pakistan) Mohammad Yousuf	(Sri Lanka) Kumar Sangakkara (wk)	(England) Andrew Flintoff	(Australia) Shane Warne	(South Africa) Makhaya Ntini	(Sri Lanka) Muttiah Muralitharan	(Australia) Glenn McGrath	(Australia) Brett Lee
2007	(Australia) Matthew Hayden	(England) Michael Vaughan	(Australia) Ricky Ponting (c)	(Pakistan) Mohammad Yousuf	(England) Kevin Pietersen	(Australia) Michael Hussey	(Sri Lanka) Kumar Sangakkara (wk)	(Australia) Stuart Clark	(South Africa) Makhaya Ntini	(Pakistan) Mohammad Asif	(Sri Lanka) Muttiah Muralitharan	(India) Zaheer Khan
2008	(South Africa) Graeme Smith (c)	(India) Virender Sehwag	(Sri Lanka) Mahela Jayawardene	(Cricket West Indies) Shivnarine Chanderpaul	(England) Kevin Pietersen	(South Africa) Jacques Kallis	(Sri Lanka) Kumar Sangakkara (wk)	(Australia) Brett Lee	(England) Ryan Sidebottom	(South Africa) Dale Steyn	(Sri Lanka) Muttiah Muralitharan	(Australia) Stuart Clark
2009	(India) Gautam Gambhir	(England) Andrew Strauss	(South Africa) AB de Villiers	(India) Sachin Tendulkar	(Sri Lanka) Thilan Samaraweera	(Australia) Michael Clarke	(India) MS Dhoni (c/wk)	(Bangladesh) Shakib Al Hasan	(Australia) Mitchell Johnson	(England) Stuart Broad	(South Africa) Dale Steyn	(India) Harbhajan Singh
2010	(India) Virender Sehwag	(Australia) Simon Katich	(India) Sachin Tendulkar	(South Africa) Hashim Amla	(Sri Lanka) Kumar Sangakkara	(South Africa) Jacques Kallis	(India) MS Dhoni (c/wk)	(England) Graeme Swann	(England) James Anderson	(South Africa) Dale Steyn	(Australia) Doug Bollinger	
2011	(England) Alastair Cook	(South Africa) Hashim Amla	(England) Jonathan Trott	(India) Sachin Tendulkar	(Sri Lanka) Kumar Sangakkara (c/wk)	(South Africa) AB de Villiers	(South Africa) Jacques Kallis	(England) Stuart Broad	(England) Graeme Swann	(South Africa) Dale Steyn	(England) James Anderson	(India) Zaheer Khan
2012	(England) Alastair Cook	(South Africa) Hashim Amla	(Sri Lanka) Kumar Sangakkara	(South Africa) Jacques Kallis	(Australia) Michael Clarke (c)	(Cricket West Indies) Shivnarine Chanderpaul	(England) Matt Prior (wk)	(England) Stuart Broad	(Pakistan) Saeed Ajmal	(South Africa) Vernon Philander	(South Africa) Dale Steyn	(South Africa) AB de Villiers
2013	(England) Alastair Cook (c)	(India) Cheteshwar Pujara	(South Africa) Hashim Amla	(Australia) Michael Clarke	(Australia) Michael Hussey	(South Africa) AB de Villiers	(India) MS Dhoni (wk)	(England) Graeme Swann	(South Africa) Dale Steyn	(England) James Anderson	(South Africa) Vernon Philander	(India) Ravichandran Ashwin
2014	(Australia) David Warner	(New Zealand) Kane Williamson	(Sri Lanka) Kumar Sangakkara	(South Africa) AB de Villiers (wk)	(England) Joe Root	(Sri Lanka) Angelo Mathews (c)	(Australia) Mitchell Johnson	(England) Stuart Broad	(South Africa) Dale Steyn	(Sri Lanka) Rangana Herath	(New Zealand) Tim Southee	(New Zealand) Ross Taylor
2015	(Australia) David Warner	(England) Alastair Cook (c)	(New Zealand) Kane Williamson	(Pakistan) Younis Khan	(Australia) Steve Smith	(England) Joe Root	(Pakistan) Sarfaraz Ahmed (wk)	(England) Stuart Broad	(New Zealand) Trent Boult	(Pakistan) Yasir Shah	(Australia) Josh Hazlewood	(India) Ravichandran Ashwin
2016	(Australia) David Warner	(England) Alastair Cook (c)	(New Zealand) Kane Williamson	(England) Joe Root	(Australia) Adam Voges	(England) Jonny Bairstow (wk)	(England) Ben Stokes	(India) Ravichandran Ashwin	(Sri Lanka) Rangana Herath	(Australia) Mitchell Starc	(South Africa) Dale Steyn	(Australia) Steve Smith
2017	(South Africa) Dean Elgar	(Australia) David Warner	(India) Virat Kohli (c)	(Australia) Steve Smith	(India) Cheteshwar Pujara	(England) Ben Stokes	(South Africa) Quinton de Kock (wk)	(India) Ravichandran Ashwin	(Australia) Mitchell Starc	(South Africa) Kagiso Rabada	(England) James Anderson	
2018	(New Zealand) Tom Latham	(Sri Lanka) Dimuth Karunaratne	(New Zealand) Kane Williamson	(India) Virat Kohli (c)	(New Zealand) Henry Nicholls	(India) Rishabh Pant (wk)	(Cricket West Indies) Jason Holder	(South Africa) Kagiso Rabada	(Australia) Nathan Lyon	(India) Jasprit Bumrah	(Pakistan) Mohammad Abbas	
2019	(India) Mayank Agarwal	(New Zealand) Tom Latham	(Australia) Marnus Labuschagne	(India) Virat Kohli (c)	(Australia) Steve Smith	(England) Ben Stokes	(New Zealand) BJ Watling (wk)	(Australia) Pat Cummins	(Australia) Mitchell Starc	(New Zealand) Neil Wagner	(Australia) Nathan Lyon	
2021	(Sri Lanka) Dimuth Karunaratne	(India) Rohit Sharma	(Australia) Marnus Labuschagne	(England) Joe Root	(New Zealand) Kane Williamson (c)	(Pakistan) Fawad Alam	(India) Rishabh Pant (wk)	(India) Ravichandran Ashwin	(New Zealand) Kyle Jamieson	(Pakistan) Hasan Ali	(Pakistan) Shaheen Afridi	
2022	(Australia) Usman Khawaja	(Cricket West Indies) Kraigg Brathwaite	(Australia) Marnus Labuschagne	(Pakistan) Babar Azam	(England) Jonny Bairstow	(England) Ben Stokes (c)	(India) Rishabh Pant (wk)	(Australia) Pat Cummins	(South Africa) Kagiso Rabada	(Australia) Nathan Lyon	(England) James Anderson	
2023	(Australia) Usman Khawaja	(Sri Lanka) Dimuth Karunaratne	(New Zealand) Kane Williamson	(England) Joe Root	(Australia) Travis Head	(India) Ravindra Jadeja	(Australia) Alex Carey (wk)	(Australia) Pat Cummins (c)	(India) Ravichandran Ashwin	(Australia) Mitchell Starc	(England) Stuart Broad	
2024	(India) Yashasvi Jaiswal	(England) Ben Duckett	(New Zealand) Kane Williamson	(England) Joe Root	(England) Harry Brook	(Sri Lanka) Kamindu Mendis	(England) Jamie Smith (wk)	(India) Ravindra Jadeja	(Australia) Pat Cummins (c)	(New Zealand) Matt Henry	(India) Jasprit Bumrah	

== Superlatives ==
Players marked bold are still active in Test matches and years marked bold indicate they won the ICC Test Player of the Year in that respective year:

#	Player	Team	Appearances	First XI	12th man	Years
1	Dale Steyn	South Africa	8	8	0	**2008**, 2009, 2010, 2011, 2012, 2013, 2014, 2016
2	Kumar Sangakkara	Sri Lanka	7	7	0	2006, 2007, 2008, 2010, 2011, **2012**, 2014
2	Kane Williamson	New Zealand	7	7	0	2014, 2015, 2016, 2018, 2021, 2023, 2024
4	Jacques Kallis	South Africa	6	6	0	2004, **2005**, 2008, 2010, 2011, 2012
4	Stuart Broad	England	6	6	0	2009, 2011, 2012, 2014, 2015, 2023
4	Ravichandran Ashwin	India	6	4	2	2013, 2015, **2016**, 2017, 2021, 2023
4	**Joe Root**	England	6	6	0	2014, 2015, 2016, **2021**, 2023, 2024
8	AB de Villiers	South Africa	5	4	1	2009, 2011, 2012, 2013, 2014
8	Alastair Cook	England	5	5	0	**2011**, 2012, 2013, 2015, 2016
8	James Anderson	England	5	5	0	2010, 2011, 2013, 2017, 2022
11	Ricky Ponting	Australia	4	4	0	2004, 2005, **2006**, 2007
11	Hashim Amla	South Africa	4	4	0	2010, 2011, 2012, 2013
11	David Warner	Australia	4	4	0	2014, 2015, 2016, 2017
11	**Steve Smith**	Australia	4	3	1	**2015**, 2016, **2017**, 2019
11	Ben Stokes	England	4	4	0	2016, 2017, 2019, **2022**
11	**Mitchell Starc**	Australia	4	4	0	2016, 2017, 2019, 2023
11	**Pat Cummins**	Australia	4	4	0	**2019**, 2022, 2023, 2024
6	Shane Warne	Australia	3	3	0	2004, 2005, 2006
6	Matthew Hayden	Australia	3	3	0	2004, 2006, 2007
6	Muttiah Muralitharan	Sri Lanka	3	3	0	2006, 2007, 2008
6	Virender Sehwag	India	3	3	0	2005, 2008, **2010**
6	Sachin Tendulkar	India	3	3	0	2009, 2010, 2011
6	Michael Hussey	Australia	3	3	0	2006, 2007, 2013
6	MS Dhoni	India	3	3	0	2009, 2010, 2013
6	Graeme Swann	England	3	3	0	2010, 2011, 2013
6	Michael Clarke	Australia	3	3	0	2009, 2012, **2013**
6	Virat Kohli	India	3	3	0	2017, **2018**, 2019
6	**Kagiso Rabada**	South Africa	3	3	0	2017, 2018, 2022
6	**Nathan Lyon**	Australia	3	3	0	2018, 2019, 2022
6	**Marnus Labuschagne**	Australia	3	3	0	2019, 2021, 2022
6	Dimuth Karunaratne	Sri Lanka	3	3	0	2018, 2021, 2023
7	Adam Gilchrist	Australia	2	2	0	2004, 2005
7	Brian Lara	West Indies	2	2	0	2004, 2005
7	Chaminda Vaas	Sri Lanka	2	2	0	2004, 2005
7	Rahul Dravid	India	2	2	0	**2004**, 2006
7	Andrew Flintoff	England	2	2	0	2005, 2006
7	Glenn McGrath	Australia	2	2	0	2005, 2006
7	Makhaya Ntini	South Africa	2	2	0	2006, 2007
7	Mohammad Yousuf	Pakistan	2	2	0	2006, **2007**
7	Graeme Smith	South Africa	2	2	0	2005, 2008
7	Kevin Pietersen	England	2	2	0	2007, 2008
7	Shivnarine Chanderpaul	West Indies	2	2	0	2008, 2012
7	Vernon Philander	South Africa	2	2	0	2012, 2013
7	Mitchell Johnson	Australia	2	2	0	2009, **2014**
7	Rangana Herath	Sri Lanka	2	2	0	2014, 2016
7	Cheteshwar Pujara	India	2	2	0	2013, 2017
7	**Tom Latham**	New Zealand	2	2	0	2018, 2019
7	**Jonny Bairstow**	England	2	2	0	2016, 2022
7	**Rishabh Pant**	India	2	2	0	2021, 2022
7	Usman Khawaja	Australia	2	2	0	2022, **2023**
7	**Jasprit Bumrah**	India	2	2	0	2018, **2024**
7	**Ravindra Jadeja**	India	2	2	0	2023, 2024
7	Brett Lee	Australia	2	1	1	2006, 2008
7	Stuart Clark	Australia	2	1	1	2007, 2008
7	Zaheer Khan	India	2	0	2	2007, 2011

=== Appearances by nation ===
Country	2004	2005	2006	2007	2008	2009	2010	2011	2012	2013	2014	2015	2016	2017	2018	2019	2021	2022	2023	2024	Total
Australia	5	4	6	4	2	2	2		1	2	2	3	4	3	1	5	1	4	5	1	57
England	1	1	1	2	2	2	2	5	3	3	2	3	4	2		1	1	3	2	4	44
India	1	2	1	1	1	4	3	2		3		1	1	3	3	2	3	1	2	3	37
South Africa	2	2	1	1	3	2	3	4	5	4	2		1	3	1			1			35
Sri Lanka	1	1	2	2	3	1	1	1	1		3		1		1		1		1	1	21
New Zealand											3	2	1		3	3	2		1	2	17
Pakistan		1	1	2					1			3			1		3	1			13
West Indies	1	1			1				1						1			1			6
Bangladesh						1															1

== See also ==
- ICC Awards
- Sir Garfield Sobers Trophy (Men's Cricketer of the Year)
- ICC Men's Test Cricketer of the Year
- ICC Men's ODI Cricketer of the Year
- ICC Men's ODI Team of the Year
- David Shepherd Trophy (Umpire of the Year)
- ICC Women's Cricketer of the Year
