= 2010 ICC Awards =

Cricket award edition

- Date: 6 October 2010
- Presented by: ICC

Highlights
- Cricketer of the Year: (India) Sachin Tendulkar (1st award)
- Test Player of the Year: (India) Virender Sehwag (1st award)
- ODI Player of the Year: (South Africa) AB de Villiers (1st award)
- Emerging Player of the Year: (England) Steven Finn
- Website: www.icc-cricket.com

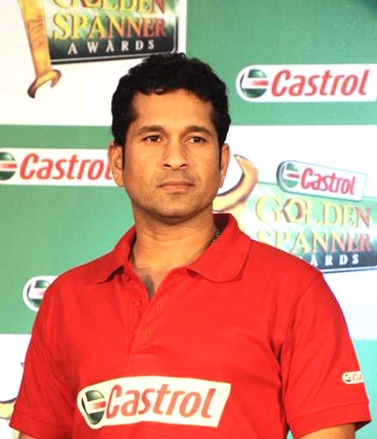
2010 Cricketer of the Year Sachin Tendulkar.

The 2010 ICC Awards were held on 6 October 2010 in Bangalore, India in association with the Federation of International Cricketers' Associations (FICA).

The ICC had been hosting ICC Awards since 2004, which were now into their seventh year. Previous events were held in London (2004), Sydney (2005), Mumbai (2006), Johannesburg (2007, 2009) and Dubai (2008).

The ICC awards the Sir Garfield Sobers Trophy to the Cricketer of the Year, which is considered to be the most prestigious award in world cricket.

== Selection Committee ==
Chaired by ICC Cricket Hall of Famer Clive Lloyd, the ICC Selection Committee was charged with two main tasks. Using their experience, knowledge and appreciation of the game, they selected the ICC World XI Teams and provided a long list of nominations to the 25 members of the voting academy to cast their votes in the individual player award categories.

Selection Committee members:

- (Cricket West Indies) Clive Lloyd (chairman)
- (England) Angus Fraser
- (Zimbabwe) Duncan Fletcher
- (Australia) Matthew Hayden
- (India) Ravi Shastri

== Award categories and winners ==
=== Cricketer of the Year ===
- (India) Sachin Tendulkar

=== Test Player of the Year ===
- (India) Virender Sehwag

=== ODI Player of the Year ===
- (South Africa) AB de Villiers

=== Twenty20 International Performance of the Year ===
- (New Zealand) Brendon McCullum, for scoring 116 not out off 56 deliveries against Australia at Lancaster Park in Christchurch on 28 February 2010

=== Emerging Player of the Year ===
- (England) Steven Finn

=== Associate Player of the Year ===
- (Netherlands) Ryan ten Doeschate

=== Umpire of the Year ===
- (Pakistan) Aleem Dar

=== Women's Cricketer of the Year ===
- (Australia) Shelley Nitschke

=== Spirit of Cricket ===
- New Zealand

=== LG People's Choice Award ===
- (India) Sachin Tendulkar

== ICC World XI Teams ==
=== ICC Test Team of the Year ===
MS Dhoni was selected as both captain and wicket-keeper of the Test Team of the Year. Other players are:

- (India) Virender Sehwag
- (Australia) Simon Katich
- (India) Sachin Tendulkar
- (South Africa) Hashim Amla
- (Sri Lanka) Kumar Sangakkara
- (South Africa) Jacques Kallis
- (India) MS Dhoni
- (England) Graeme Swann
- (England) James Anderson
- (South Africa) Dale Steyn
- (Australia) Doug Bollinger

=== ICC ODI Team of the Year ===
Ricky Ponting was selected as the captain of the ODI Team of the Year, with MS Dhoni also selected as the wicket-keeper. Other players are:

- (India) Sachin Tendulkar
- (Australia) Shane Watson
- (Australia) Michael Hussey
- (South Africa) AB de Villiers
- (England) Paul Collingwood
- (Australia) Ricky Ponting
- (India) MS Dhoni
- (New Zealand) Daniel Vettori
- (England) Stuart Broad
- (Australia) Doug Bollinger
- (Australia) Ryan Harris

== Short lists ==
The following are the short lists for the 2010 LG ICC Awards:

=== Cricketer of the Year ===
- (South Africa) Hashim Amla
- (India) Virender Sehwag
- (England) Graeme Swann
- (India) Sachin Tendulkar

=== Test Player of the Year ===
- (South Africa) Hashim Amla
- (India) Virender Sehwag
- (South Africa) Dale Steyn
- (India) Sachin Tendulkar

=== ODI Player of the Year ===
- (Australia) Ryan Harris
- (India) Sachin Tendulkar
- (South Africa) AB de Villiers
- (Australia) Shane Watson

=== Twenty20 International Performance of the Year ===
- (Australia) Michael Hussey
- (Sri Lanka) Mahela Jayawardene
- (New Zealand) Brendon McCullum
- (South Africa) Ryan McLaren

=== Emerging Player of the Year ===
- (Pakistan) Umar Akmal
- (England) Steven Finn
- (Sri Lanka) Angelo Mathews
- (Australia) Tim Paine

=== Associate Player of the Year ===
- (Netherlands) Ryan ten Doeschate
- (Ireland) Trent Johnston
- (Ireland) Kevin O'Brien
- (Afghanistan) Mohammad Shahzad

=== Umpire of the Year ===
- (Pakistan) Aleem Dar
- (England) Steve Davis
- (New Zealand) Tony Hill
- (Australia) Simon Taufel

=== Women's Cricketer of the Year ===
- (England) Katherine Brunt
- (Australia) Shelley Nitschke
- (Australia) Ellyse Perry
- (Cricket West Indies) Stafanie Taylor

=== Spirit of Cricket ===
- India
- New Zealand
- Sri Lanka
- Zimbabwe

=== LG People's Choice Award ===
- (Australia) Michael Hussey
- (Sri Lanka) Mahela Jayawardene
- (England) Andrew Strauss
- (India) Sachin Tendulkar
- (South Africa) AB de Villiers

== Nominations ==
The following are the nominations for the 2010 LG ICC Awards, initially announced on 18 August 2010:

=== Cricketer of the Year ===
- (South Africa) Hashim Amla
- (Australia) Doug Bollinger
- (Australia) Michael Clarke
- (India) MS Dhoni
- (Australia) Ryan Harris
- (Australia) Mitchell Johnson
- (South Africa) Jacques Kallis
- (South Africa) Morné Morkel
- (Australia) Ricky Ponting
- (Sri Lanka) Kumar Sangakkara
- (India) Virender Sehwag
- (South Africa) Dale Steyn
- (England) Graeme Swann
- (India) Sachin Tendulkar
- (New Zealand) Daniel Vettori
- (South Africa) AB de Villiers
- (Australia) Shane Watson

=== Test Player of the Year ===
- (South Africa) Hashim Amla
- (England) James Anderson
- (Pakistan) Mohammad Asif
- (Australia) Doug Bollinger
- (India) MS Dhoni
- (Bangladesh) Tamim Iqbal
- (Sri Lanka) Mahela Jayawardene
- (South Africa) Jacques Kallis
- (Australia) Simon Katich
- (Sri Lanka) Kumar Sangakkara
- (Sri Lanka) Thilan Samaraweera
- (India) Virender Sehwag
- (South Africa) Dale Steyn
- (England) Graeme Swann
- (India) Sachin Tendulkar
- (Australia) Shane Watson

=== ODI Player of the Year ===
- (South Africa) Hashim Amla
- (Australia) Doug Bollinger
- (India) MS Dhoni
- (Sri Lanka) Tillakaratne Dilshan
- (Australia) Ryan Harris
- (Australia) Michael Hussey
- (South Africa) Jacques Kallis
- (Australia) Ricky Ponting
- (India) Virender Sehwag
- (India) Sachin Tendulkar
- (New Zealand) Daniel Vettori
- (South Africa) AB de Villiers
- (Australia) Shane Watson
- (Australia) Cameron White

=== Twenty20 International Performance of the Year ===
- (Cricket West Indies) Sulieman Benn
- (Cricket West Indies) Deandra Dottin
- (Cricket West Indies) Chris Gayle
- (Australia) Michael Hussey
- (Sri Lanka) Mahela Jayawardene
- (Sri Lanka) Nuwan Kulasekara
- (New Zealand) Brendon McCullum
- (South Africa) Ryan McLaren
- (England) Eoin Morgan
- (Zimbabwe) Nehemiah Odhiambo
- (Australia) Ellyse Perry
- (India) Suresh Raina
- (Cricket West Indies) Darren Sammy

=== Emerging Player of the Year ===
- (Pakistan) Mohammad Amir
- (Pakistan) Umar Akmal
- (England) Tim Bresnan
- (England) Steven Finn
- (Bangladesh) Shafiul Islam
- (India) Ravindra Jadeja
- (India) Virat Kohli
- (Sri Lanka) Angelo Mathews
- (England) Eoin Morgan
- (India) Pragyan Ojha
- (Australia) Tim Paine
- (South Africa) Wayne Parnell
- (Cricket West Indies) Kemar Roach
- (Australia) Steve Smith
- (Ireland) Paul Stirling
- (Australia) David Warner

=== Associate Player of the Year ===
- (Canada) Ashish Bagai
- (Scotland) Richie Berrington
- (Netherlands) Mudassar Bukhari
- (Netherlands) Tom Cooper
- (Netherlands) Ryan ten Doeschate
- (Ireland) Trent Johnston
- (Ireland) Kevin O'Brien
- (Afghanistan) Mohammad Shahzad
- (Afghanistan) Samiullah Shenwari
- (Ireland) Paul Stirling

=== Umpire of the Year ===
- (New Zealand) Billy Bowden
- (Pakistan) Aleem Dar
- (England) Steve Davis
- (Sri Lanka) Asoka de Silva
- (Cricket West Indies) Billy Doctrove
- (South Africa) Marais Erasmus
- (England) Ian Gould
- (New Zealand) Tony Hill
- (Australia) Daryl Harper
- (South Africa) Rudi Koertzen
- (Pakistan) Asad Rauf
- (Australia) Simon Taufel
- (Australia) Rod Tucker

=== Women's Cricketer of the Year ===
- (New Zealand) Suzie Bates
- (New Zealand) Nicola Browne
- (England) Katherine Brunt
- (New Zealand) Sophie Devine
- (India) Jhulan Goswami
- (England) Lydia Greenway
- (New Zealand) Sarah McGlashan
- (Australia) Shelley Nitschke
- (Australia) Ellyse Perry
- (Australia) Leah Poulton
- (India) Mithali Raj
- (India) Gouher Sultana
- (Cricket West Indies) Stafanie Taylor

== Development Awards ==
2010 saw the inaugural edition of the ICC Development Awards, exclusively for Associate nations.

Category	Winner	Additional notes
Best Overall Cricket Development Programme	Scotland	
Best Women's Cricket Initiative	Japan	
Best Junior Participation Initiative	Papua New Guinea	
Best Cricket Promotion and Marketing Programme	Papua New Guinea Ireland	PNG staged a Pacific Don't Drink and Drive Legend Event, with former international cricketers leading every side. Cricket Ireland staged a promotional activity before an ODI vs Australia, where both teams tried hurling at Croke Park.
Best Spirit of Cricket	Suriname	For organizing a charity tournament with all proceeds towards local orphanages
Photo of the Year	Bermuda	Awarded to Fiona Holmes
Volunteer of the Year	France	Awarded to Neil Saint
Lifetime Service Awards	United Arab Emirates	Awarded to Mazhar Khan

== See also ==
- International Cricket Council
- ICC Awards
- Sir Garfield Sobers Trophy (Cricketer of the Year)
- ICC Test Player of the Year
- ICC ODI Player of the Year
- David Shepherd Trophy (Umpire of the Year)
- ICC Women's Cricketer of the Year
- ICC Test Team of the Year
- ICC ODI Team of the Year
