= Hasan Ali (cricketer) =

Pakistani cricketer (born 1994)

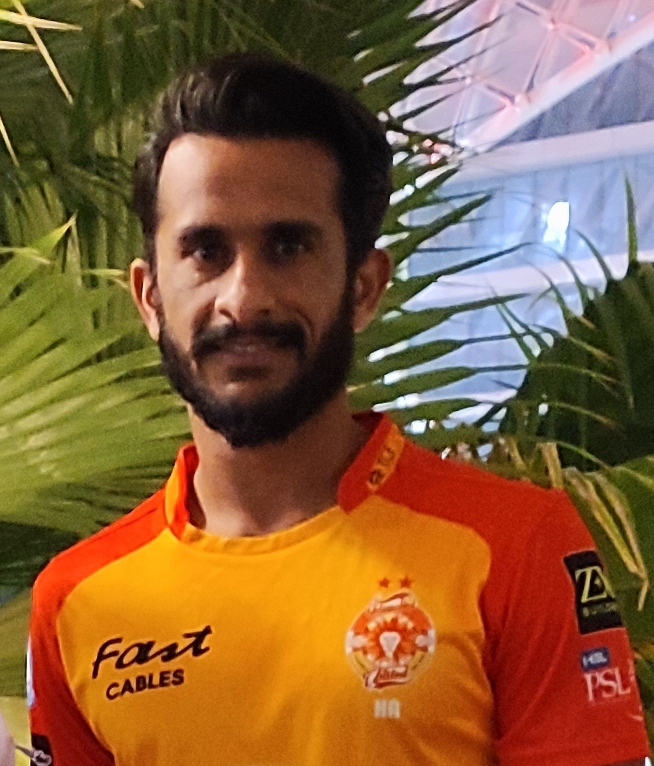
- Hasan Ali in 2021

Personal information
- Born: 2 July 1994 (age 32); Ladhe Wala Waraich, Gujranwala, Pakistan
- Batting: Right-handed
- Bowling: Right-arm medium-fast
- Role: Bowler
- Relatives: Athar Mahmood (cousin)

International information
- National side: Pakistan (2016–present)
- Test debut (cap 228): 10 May 2017 v West Indies
- Last Test: 16 May 2026 v Bangladesh
- ODI debut (cap 209): 18 August 2016 v Ireland
- Last ODI: 12 August 2025 v West Indies
- ODI shirt no.: 32
- T20I debut (cap 71): 7 September 2016 v England
- Last T20I: 30 August 2025 v UAE
- T20I shirt no.: 32

Domestic team information
- Years: Team
- 2013/14–2014/15, 2025/26: Sialkot
- 2015/16–2017/18: Islamabad
- 2016–2020: Peshawar Zalmi
- 2017: St Kitts and Nevis Patriots
- 2017, 2023: Comilla Victorians
- 2019/20–2021/22: Central Punjab
- 2021–2023: Islamabad United
- 2022: Lancashire
- 2023–2025: Warwickshire
- 2024–present: Karachi Kings
- 2025/26: Adelaide Strikers
- 2026: Yorkshire

Career statistics
Competition	Test	ODI	T20I	FC
Matches	27	68	57	92
Runs scored	407	383	147	1,868
Batting average	11.30	13.67	13.36	17.13
100s/50s	0/0	0/2	0/0	1/9
Top score	30	59	23	106*
Balls bowled	4,825	3,286	1,155	16,354
Wickets	88	102	72	345
Bowling average	28.09	31.16	23.30	25.79
5 wickets in innings	6	4	1	18
10 wickets in match	1	0	0	4
Best bowling	5/27	5/34	5/30	8/107
Catches/stumpings	9/-	13/-	15/-	31/-
Medal record
Men's cricket
Representing Pakistan
ICC Champions Trophy
Winner	2017 England & Wales
ACC Asia Cup
Runner-up	2025 UAE
- Source: Cricinfo, 9 July 2026

Hasan Ali (Punjabi and Urdu: حسن علی; born 2 July 1994) is a Pakistani international cricketer. He plays for the Pakistan national team in all formats as a right-arm medium fast bowler. He is the quickest bowler for Pakistan to take 50 wickets in ODIs. Hasan Ali was a member of the Pakistan team that won the 2017 ICC Champions Trophy.

== Early life and career ==
Hasan Ali was born in Ladhe Wala Waraich near Gujranwala. His family encouraged him to play cricket from an early age. Two local cricketers, his elder brother Ata-ur-Rehman (not to be confused with the former international cricketer) and Ansar Zafar Rathore, were his childhood coaches and mentors.

Ali trained at Rathore's Young Combine Star Club in Gujranwala, where other international cricketers have also trained, including Imran Nazir. Ali's coaching began at the age of 10 and, considering his rapid progress and his physical fitness routine (up to eight hours a day everyday in a dedicated gym), by the age of 14 he was selected for the city's U16 side.

== International career ==
In August 2016, Ali was added to Pakistan's One Day International (ODI) squad for their series against England and Ireland. He made his ODI debut for Pakistan against Ireland on 18 August 2016. He made his Twenty20 International debut for Pakistan against England on 7 September 2016.

Ali took his first five-wicket haul in ODIs against Australia on 22 January 2017.

In April 2017, Ali was added to Pakistan's Test squad for their series against the West Indies. He made his Test debut for Pakistan in the third Test against the West Indies on 10 May 2017.

In June 2017, Ali was named in Pakistan's squad for the 2017 ICC Champions Trophy. Pakistan won the tournament for the first time, beating arch-rivals India by 180 runs. Ali named as the player of the tournament after taking 13 wickets, and also won the Golden Ball. With 13 wickets, Ali became the joint leading wicket-taker in any Champions Trophy tournament, along with Jerome Taylor.

In October 2017, against Sri Lanka, Ali became the fastest bowler for Pakistan to take 50 wickets in ODIs in terms of number of matches played. The same month, he moved to the top of the International Cricket Council's ODI rankings for bowlers, taking 426 days from debut, the third-fastest of all time.

In 2017, Ali took the most wickets in ODIs by any bowler, with 45 dismissals and was named the Pakistan Cricket Board's Emerging Player of the Year. He finished 2017 as the top ranked fast bowler in the ICC Player Rankings in ODI cricket. The ICC also named him as the ICC Men's Emerging Cricketer of the Year.

In April 2019, Ali was named in Pakistan's squad for the 2019 Cricket World Cup. On 31 May 2019, in Pakistan's opening match of the World Cup, Ali played in his 50th ODI match.

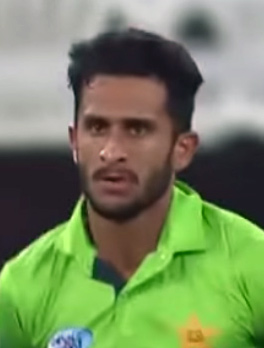
Ali bowling in 2017

In September 2021, he was named in Pakistan's squad for the 2021 ICC Men's T20 World Cup.

On 22 Sep 2023 The Pakistan Cricket Board (PCB) revealed their 15-player squad for the upcoming 2023 World Cup to be held in India. PCB included Hasan Ali, the 29-year-old fast bowler will replace Naseem Shah due to an injury sustained during the Asia Cup. In September 2023, he was selected in Pakistan's squad for the 2023 World Cup, replacing Naseem Shah who was ruled out due to injury.

== Domestic and T20 franchise career ==
He was recruited by Peshawar Zalmi for the 2016 Pakistan Super League. He made his debut against Karachi Kings in the first edition of the Pakistan Super League. He was retained by Zalmi in the player draft for the 2017 Pakistan Super League. He finished as the team's second-highest wicket-taker with 12 wickets from 11 matches.

In the 2019 Pakistan Super League, he was the leading wicket-taker in the competition, with twenty-five dismissals, and was named the Bowler of the Tournament.

In July 2019, he was selected to play for the Amsterdam Knights in the inaugural edition of the Euro T20 Slam cricket tournament. However, the following month the tournament was cancelled.

In January 2021, he scored a century in the final of the 2020–21 Quaid-e-Azam Trophy, and was named the player of the final and the tournament. In January 2021, he was named as the captain of Central Punjab for the 2020–21 Pakistan Cup. In December 2021, he was signed by Islamabad United following the players' draft for the 2022 Pakistan Super League. In March 2022, he was signed by Lancashire County Cricket Club to play in six matches in the County Championship in England. In 2023, he was traded from Islamabad United to Karachi Kings in exchange of Imad Wasim. On 19 June 2025, Hassan Ali was picked by Adelaide Strikers for the BBL 15 in draft. He is set to feature on 17 December 2025 against his fellow cricketer Babar Azam's team Sydney Sixers, at the famous SCG. He is set to feature in the third season of Nepal Premier League as he joins Chitwan Rhinos.

== Personal life ==
In 2019, Hasan Ali married Samiya Arzoo in Dubai. His wife is originally from Faridabad, India. Aarzoo studied Aeronautical engineering at Manav Rachna Institute and moved to Dubai to work at the Emirates airline. Ali and his wife have two daughters and a son.

== Awards and recognition ==
- PCB's Emerging Player of the year: 2017
- ICC World ODI XI: 2017
- ICC Men's Emerging Cricketer of the Year: 2017
- PCB's ODI Player of the year: 2018
- PCB's Test Cricketer of the Year: 2021
- He was named in ICC Men's Test Team of the Year for the year 2021.

== See also ==
- Pakistan Cricket Board
- International Cricket Council
