= Tom Moffat =

Australian cricketer (born 1987)

Personal information
- Born: 2 August 1987 (age 39); Adelaide, Australia
- Source: Cricinfo, 23 August 2020

Tom Moffat (born 2 August 1987) is an Australian cricketer. He played in four first-class matches for South Australia in 2010 and 2011.

In 2020 he was appointed CEO of the Federation of International Cricketers' Associations.

== See also ==
- List of South Australian representative cricketers
