= 2009 ICC Awards =

- Date: 1 October 2009
- Presented by: ICC

Highlights
- Cricketer of the Year: (Australia) Mitchell Johnson (1st award)
- Test Player of the Year: (India) Gautam Gambhir (1st award)
- ODI Player of the Year: (India) MS Dhoni (2nd award)
- Emerging Player of the Year: (Australia) Peter Siddle
- Website: www.icc-cricket.com

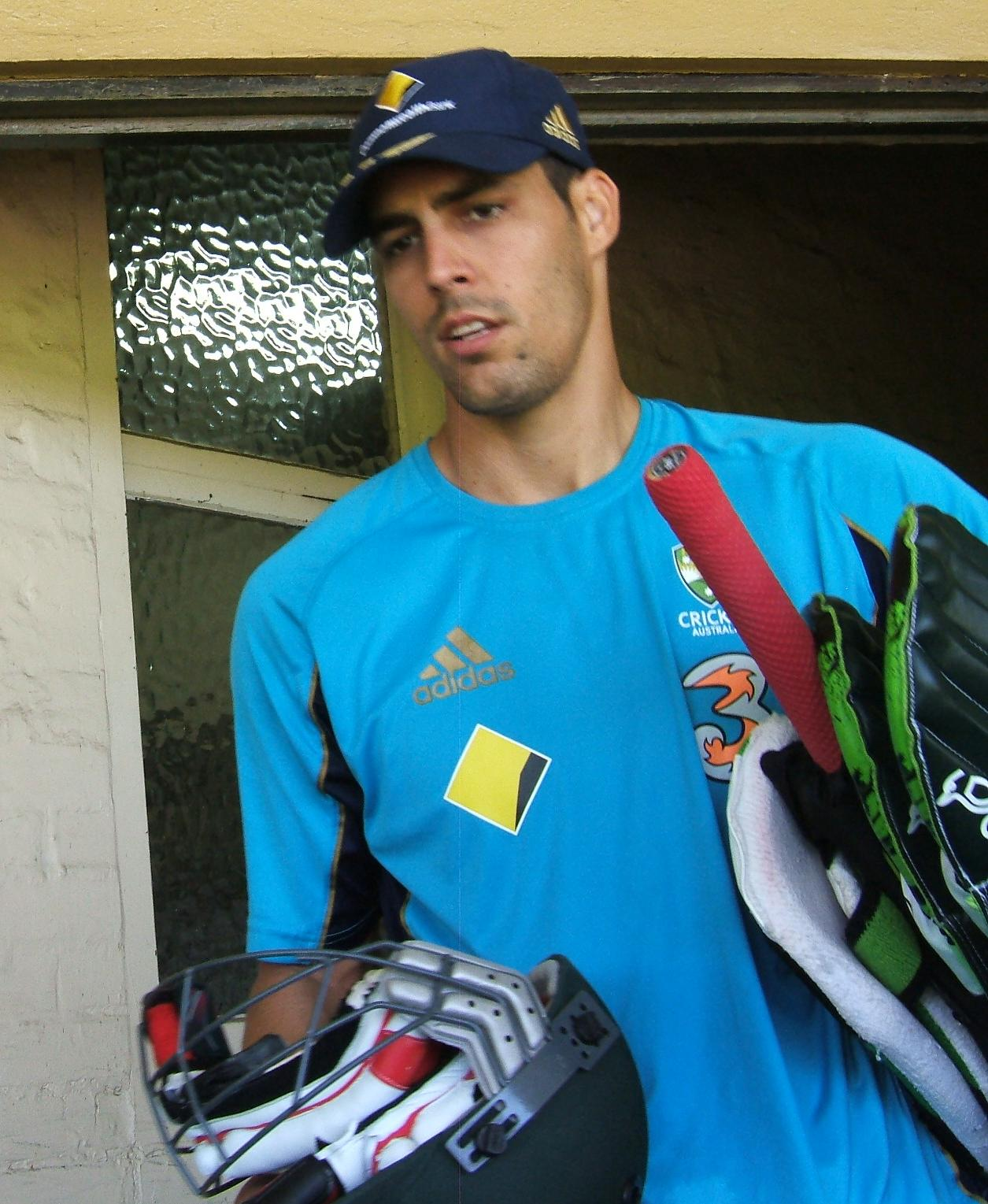
2009 Cricketer of the Year Mitchell Johnson.

The 2009 ICC Awards were held on 1 October 2009 in Johannesburg, South Africa before the semi-finals of the 2009 ICC Champions Trophy. The nominations were announced in Mumbai in early September, and short lists were announced on 15 September. These awards recognized player performance between 13 August 2008 and 24 August 2009, and were presented in association with the Federation of International Cricketers' Associations (FICA). Performances from both players and officials during this period were considered.

The ICC had hosted the ICC Awards since the 2004 and were now in their sixth year. Previous events were held in London (2004), Sydney (2005), Mumbai (2006), and Dubai (2008), with Johannesburg also hosting in 2007. The awards include the Sir Garfield Sobers Trophy for Cricketer of the Year, which is considered the most prestigious award in world cricket.ICC

== Sponsors ==
As indicated by the logo of these awards, LG, a leading electronic brand, sponsored these awards along with other ICC sponsors.

== Selection Committee ==
Chaired by ICC Cricket Hall of Famer Clive Lloyd, the ICC Selection Committee was responsible for two main tasks: selecting the ICC World XI Teams and providing a long list of nominations for individual player award categories to the 25 members of the voting academy. They used their experience, knowledge, and appreciation of the game to do so.

Selection Committee members:

- (Cricket West Indies) Clive Lloyd (chairman)
- (India) Anil Kumble
- (Pakistan) Mudassar Nazar
- (New Zealand) Stephen Fleming
- (England) Bob Taylor

== Award categories and winners ==
=== Cricketer of the Year ===
- (Australia) Mitchell Johnson

=== Test Player of the Year ===
- (India) Gautam Gambhir

=== ODI Player of the Year ===
- (India) MS Dhoni

=== Twenty20 International Performance of the Year ===
- (Sri Lanka) Tillakaratne Dilshan, for scoring 96 not out off 57 deliveries against the West Indies in the semi-final of the 2009 ICC World Twenty20 at The Oval on 19 June 2009

=== Emerging Player of the Year ===
- (Australia) Peter Siddle

=== Associate Player of the Year ===
- (Ireland) William Porterfield

=== Umpire of the Year ===
- (Pakistan) Aleem Dar

=== Women's Cricketer of the Year ===
- (England) Claire Taylor

=== Spirit of Cricket ===
- New Zealand

== ICC World XI Teams ==
=== ICC Test Team of the Year ===
MS Dhoni was selected as both captain and wicket-keeper of the Test Team of the Year. Other players are:

- (India) Gautam Gambhir
- (England) Andrew Strauss
- (South Africa) AB de Villiers
- (India) Sachin Tendulkar
- (Sri Lanka) Thilan Samaraweera
- (Australia) Michael Clarke
- (India) MS Dhoni
- (Bangladesh) Shakib Al Hasan
- (Australia) Mitchell Johnson
- (England) Stuart Broad
- (South Africa) Dale Steyn
- (India) Harbhajan Singh (12th man)

=== ICC ODI Team of the Year ===
MS Dhoni was also selected as both captain and wicket-keeper of the ODI Team of the Year. Other players are:

- (India) Virender Sehwag
- (Cricket West Indies) Chris Gayle
- (England) Kevin Pietersen
- (Sri Lanka) Tillakaratne Dilshan
- (India) Yuvraj Singh
- (New Zealand) Martin Guptill
- (India) MS Dhoni
- (England) Andrew Flintoff
- (Sri Lanka) Nuwan Kulasekara
- (Sri Lanka) Ajantha Mendis
- (Pakistan) Umar Gul
- (Sri Lanka) Thilan Thushara (12th man)

== Short lists ==
The short lists for the 2009 ICC Awards were announced by the ICC on 15 September 2009 directly from Dubai and included the following:

=== Cricketer of the Year ===
- (India) MS Dhoni
- (India) Gautam Gambhir
- (Australia) Mitchell Johnson
- (England) Andrew Strauss

=== Test Player of the Year ===
- (India) Gautam Gambhir
- (Australia) Mitchell Johnson
- (Sri Lanka) Thilan Samaraweera
- (England) Andrew Strauss

=== ODI Player of the Year ===
- (Cricket West Indies) Shivnarine Chanderpaul
- (India) MS Dhoni
- (India) Virender Sehwag
- (India) Yuvraj Singh

=== Twenty20 International Performance of the Year ===
- (Pakistan) Shahid Afridi
- (Sri Lanka) Tillakaratne Dilshan
- (Cricket West Indies) Chris Gayle
- (Pakistan) Umar Gul

=== Emerging Player of the Year ===
- (Australia) Ben Hilfenhaus
- (England) Graham Onions
- (New Zealand) Jesse Ryder
- (Australia) Peter Siddle

=== Associate Player of the Year ===
- (Canada) Rizwan Cheema
- (Netherlands) Ryan ten Doeschate
- (Ireland) William Porterfield
- (Netherlands) Edgar Schiferli

=== Umpire of the Year ===
- (Pakistan) Aleem Dar
- (New Zealand) Tony Hill
- (Pakistan) Asad Rauf
- (Australia) Simon Taufel

=== Women's Cricketer of the Year ===
- (England) Charlotte Edwards
- (Australia) Shelley Nitschke
- (England) Claire Taylor

=== Spirit of Cricket ===
- Australia
- England
- New Zealand
- Sri Lanka

== Nominations ==
The nominations for the 2009 ICC Awards in different categories were announced by Virender Sehwag and Ravi Shastri in the presence of ICC CEO Haroon Lorgat.

=== Cricketer of the Year ===
- (Cricket West Indies) Shivnarine Chanderpaul
- (Sri Lanka) Tillakaratne Dilshan
- (India) MS Dhoni
- (India) Gautam Gambhir
- (Bangladesh) Shakib Al Hasan
- (Australia) Mitchell Johnson
- (England) Graham Onions
- (Sri Lanka) Thilan Samaraweera
- (Sri Lanka) Kumar Sangakkara
- (India) Harbhajan Singh
- (England) Andrew Strauss
- (New Zealand) Daniel Vettori
- (South Africa) AB de Villiers

=== Test Player of the Year ===
- (England) Stuart Broad
- (Australia) Michael Clarke
- (India) MS Dhoni
- (Sri Lanka) Tillakaratne Dilshan
- (India) Gautam Gambhir
- (Bangladesh) Shakib Al Hasan
- (Australia) Mitchell Johnson
- (India) V.V.S. Laxman
- (New Zealand) Jesse Ryder
- (Sri Lanka) Thilan Samaraweera
- (Cricket West Indies) Ramnaresh Sarwan
- (Australia) Peter Siddle
- (India) Harbhajan Singh
- (South Africa) Graeme Smith
- (South Africa) Dale Steyn
- (England) Andrew Strauss
- (England) Graeme Swann
- (New Zealand) Daniel Vettori
- (South Africa) AB de Villiers

=== ODI Player of the Year ===
- (Cricket West Indies) Shivnarine Chanderpaul
- (India) MS Dhoni
- (England) Andrew Flintoff
- (Cricket West Indies) Chris Gayle
- (Pakistan) Umar Gul
- (New Zealand) Martin Guptill
- (Australia) Michael Hussey
- (Sri Lanka) Nuwan Kulasekara
- (Sri Lanka) Ajantha Mendis
- (Sri Lanka) Muttiah Muralitharan
- (India) Yuvraj Singh
- (India) Virender Sehwag
- (Sri Lanka) Thilan Thushara

=== Twenty20 International Performance of the Year ===
- (Pakistan) Shahid Afridi
- (Pakistan) Saeed Ajmal
- (Cricket West Indies) Dwayne Bravo
- (Ireland) Alex Cusack
- (Sri Lanka) Tillakaratne Dilshan
- (Cricket West Indies) Chris Gayle
- (Pakistan) Umar Gul
- (Australia) David Hussey
- (Sri Lanka) Sanath Jayasuriya
- (India) Zaheer Khan
- (Sri Lanka) Ajantha Mendis
- (South Africa) Wayne Parnell
- (Bangladesh) Abdur Razzak
- (Australia) David Warner

=== Emerging Player of the Year ===
- (New Zealand) Martin Guptill
- (Australia) Ben Hilfenhaus
- (Australia) Phillip Hughes
- (India) Amit Mishra
- (England) Graham Onions
- (Cricket West Indies) Kemar Roach
- (New Zealand) Jesse Ryder
- (Australia) Peter Siddle

=== Associate Player of the Year ===
- (Canada) Rizwan Cheema
- (Canada) Khurram Chohan
- (Ireland) Alex Cusack
- (Netherlands) Ryan ten Doeschate
- (Ireland) Trent Johnston
- (Scotland) Neil McCallum
- (Ireland) Kevin O'Brien
- (Ireland) Niall O'Brien
- (Ireland) William Porterfield
- (Ireland) Boyd Rankin
- (Netherlands) Edgar Schiferli
- (Kenya) Steve Tikolo
- (Ireland) Regan West
- (Netherlands) Bas Zuiderent

=== Umpire of the Year ===
- (New Zealand) Billy Bowden
- (Pakistan) Aleem Dar
- (Australia) Steve Davis
- (England) Ian Gould
- (New Zealand) Tony Hill
- (Australia) Daryl Harper
- (Pakistan) Asad Rauf
- (Australia) Simon Taufel

=== Women's Cricketer of the Year ===
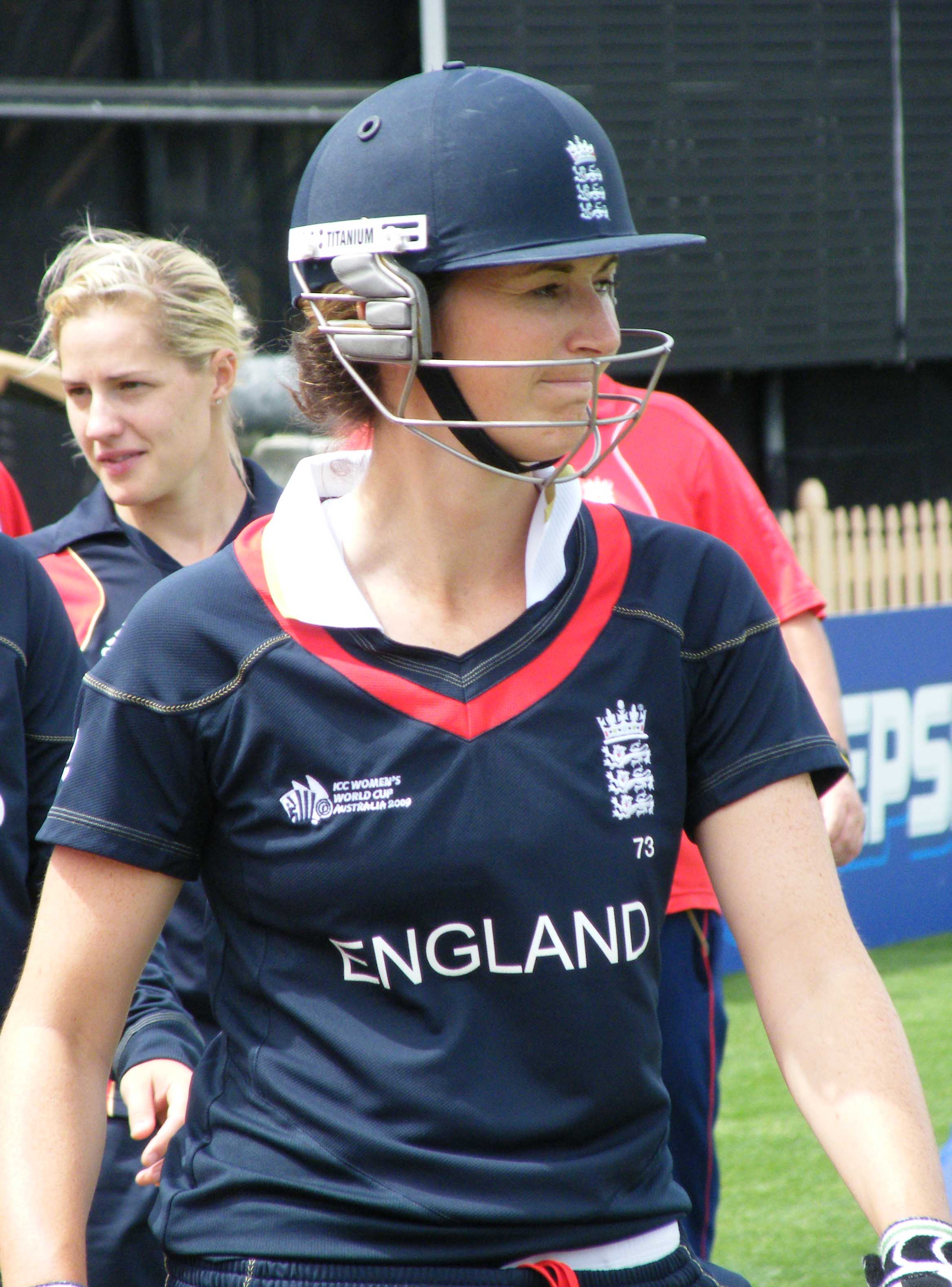
Charlotte Edwards was both shortlisted and nominated for Women's Cricketer of the Year.

- (New Zealand) Suzie Bates
- (England) Holly Colvin
- (England) Charlotte Edwards
- (England) Laura Marsh
- (Pakistan) Sana Mir
- (Australia) Shelley Nitschke
- (India) Mithali Raj
- (Australia) Karen Rolton
- (India) Priyanka Roy
- (Australia) Lisa Sthalekar
- (England) Claire Taylor
- (England) Sarah Taylor
- (Cricket West Indies) Stafanie Taylor
- (New Zealand) Haidee Tiffen
- (New Zealand) Aimee Watkins

== See also ==
- International Cricket Council
- ICC Awards
- Sir Garfield Sobers Trophy (Cricketer of the Year)
- ICC Test Player of the Year
- ICC ODI Player of the Year
- David Shepherd Trophy (Umpire of the Year)
- ICC Women's Cricketer of the Year
- ICC Test Team of the Year
- ICC ODI Team of the Year
