= Sir Garfield Sobers Trophy =

ICC Men's Cricketer of the Year

ICC Award for Best Men's Cricketer
- Presented by: ICC
- First award: 2004
- Final award: 2024
- Currently held by: (India) Jasprit Bumrah (1st award)

Highlights
- Most awards: (Australia) Ricky Ponting (Australia) Mitchell Johnson (India) Virat Kohli (2 awards each)
- Website: ICC Awards

The Sir Garfield Sobers Trophy is a Cricket trophy that is awarded annually by the International Cricket Council to the ICC Men's Cricketer of the Year. It is considered to be the most prestigious of the annual ICC Awards and was first awarded in 2004 to Rahul Dravid.

The trophy is named after former West Indies cricket captain Sir Garfield Sobers, whose name was chosen by a panel consisting of Richie Benaud, Sunil Gavaskar and Michael Holding. They were asked by the ICC to select "an individual with whom to honour cricket's ultimate individual award".

== Selection ==
The recipient of the annual award is selected by an "academy" of 56 individuals (expanded from 50 in 2004), including the current national team captains of the Test-playing nations (10), members of the elite panel of ICC umpires and referees (18), and certain prominent former players and cricket correspondents (28). In the event of a tie in the voting, the award is shared.

== List of winners ==
Key
§	Indicates individual was shortlisted

Year	Image	Winner	Team	Nominees	Notes	Ref(s)
2004	Rahul Dravid in 2010	Rahul Dravid	India	Andrew Flintoff (England) §; Steve Harmison (England); Shane Warne (Australia) §; Jacques Kallis (South Africa) §; Brian Lara (West Indies); V. V. S. Laxman (India); Ricky Ponting (Australia); Muttiah Muralitharan (Sri Lanka); Virender Sehwag (India)	Also named Test Player of the Year	
2005	Jacques Kallis in 2009	Jacques Kallis	South Africa	Glenn McGrath (Australia); Adam Gilchrist (Australia); Inzamam-ul-Haq (Pakistan); Rahul Dravid (India); Shane Warne (Australia)	Also named Test Player of the Year and selected as 12th man for the ODI Team of the Year	
2005	Andrew Flintoff in 2006	Andrew Flintoff	England	Glenn McGrath (Australia); Adam Gilchrist (Australia); Inzamam-ul-Haq (Pakistan); Rahul Dravid (India); Shane Warne (Australia)	Also named in the Test Team of the Year and ODI Team of the Year	
2006	Ricky Ponting in 2006	Ricky Ponting	Australia	Andrew Flintoff (England); Rahul Dravid (India); Mahela Jayawardene (Sri Lanka); Younis Khan (Pakistan); Monty Panesar (England); Brett Lee (Australia); Makhaya Ntini (South Africa); Adam Gilchrist (Australia); Michael Hussey (Australia) §; Mohammad Yousuf (Pakistan) §; Muttiah Muralitharan (Sri Lanka) §; Shane Warne (Australia)	Also named in the Test Team of the Year and ODI Team of the Year	
2007	Ricky Ponting in 2009	Ricky Ponting	Australia	Matthew Hayden (Australia); Michael Hussey (Australia); Jacques Kallis (South Africa); Glenn McGrath (Australia); Muttiah Muralitharan (Sri Lanka); Kevin Pietersen (England); Shaun Pollock (South Africa); Kumar Sangakkara (Sri Lanka); Mohammad Yousuf (Pakistan) §; Shivnarine Chanderpaul (West Indies) §; Mahela Jayawardene (Sri Lanka)	Also named captain of the Test Team of the Year and ODI Team of the Year	
2008	Shivnarine Chanderpaul in 2006	Shivnarine Chanderpaul	West Indies	Dale Steyn (South Africa) §; Graeme Smith (South Africa) §; Mahela Jayawardene (Sri Lanka) §	Also named in the Test Team of the Year	
2009	Mitchell Johnson in 2009	Mitchell Johnson	Australia	Gautam Gambhir (India) §; Thilan Samaraweera (Sri Lanka) §; Andrew Strauss (England) §; Shivnarine Chanderpaul (West Indies); Tillakaratne Dilshan (Sri Lanka); MS Dhoni (India); Shakib Al Hasan (Bangladesh); Graham Onions (England); Kumar Sangakkara (Sri Lanka); Harbhajan Singh (India); Graeme Smith (South Africa); Daniel Vettori (New Zealand); AB de Villiers (South Africa)	Also named in the Test Team of the Year	
2010	Sachin Tendulkar in 2013	Sachin Tendulkar	India	MS Dhoni (India); Doug Bollinger (Australia); Michael Clarke (Australia); Ryan Harris (Australia); Mitchell Johnson (Australia); Jacques Kallis (South Africa); Morné Morkel (South Africa); Ricky Ponting (Australia); Kumar Sangakkara (Sri Lanka); Dale Steyn (South Africa); Daniel Vettori (New Zealand); AB de Villiers (South Africa); Shane Watson (Australia); Virender Sehwag (India) §; Hashim Amla (South Africa) §; Graeme Swann (England) §	Also named in the Test Team of the Year and ODI Team of the Year	
2011	Jonathan Trott in 2010	Jonathan Trott	England	Ian Bell (England); Stuart Broad (England); Graeme Swann (England); Chris Tremlett (England); James Anderson (England); Shane Watson (Australia); Dale Steyn (South Africa) §; Alastair Cook (England) §; Sachin Tendulkar (India) §	Also named in the Test Team of the Year	
2012	Kumar Sangakkara in 2014	Kumar Sangakkara	Sri Lanka	Saeed Ajmal (Pakistan); Hashim Amla (South Africa) §; Stuart Broad (England); Michael Clarke (Australia §; Alastair Cook (England); Virat Kohli (India); Vernon Philander (South Africa) §; Stafanie Taylor (West Indies)	Also named Test Player of the Year, named People's Choice Award, named in the Test Team of the Year and ODI Team of the Year	
2013	Michael Clarke in 2009	Michael Clarke	Australia	Alastair Cook (England) §; James Anderson (England) §; Hashim Amla (South Africa) §; MS Dhoni (India) §; Kumar Sangakkara (Sri Lanka) §	Also named Test Player of the Year	
2014	Mitchell Johnson in 2014	Mitchell Johnson	Australia	AB de Villiers (South Africa) §; Angelo Mathews (Sri Lanka) §; Kumar Sangakkara (Sri Lanka) §	Also named Test Player of the Year	
2015	Steve Smith in 2018	Steve Smith	Australia	—N/a	Also named Test Player of the Year and named in the ODI Team of the Year	
2016	Ravichandran Ashwin in 2014	Ravichandran Ashwin	India	—N/a	Also named Test Player of the Year	
2017	Virat Kohli in 2017	Virat Kohli	India	—N/a	Also named captain of the Test Team of the Year, named ODI Player of the Year and captain of the ODI Team of the Year	
2018	Virat Kohli in 2017	Virat Kohli	India	—N/a	Also named Test Player of the Year, named captain of the Test Team of the Year, named ODI Player of the Year and captain of the ODI Team of the Year	
2019	Ben Stokes in 2014	Ben Stokes	England	—N/a	Also named in the Test Team of the Year and ODI Team of the Year	
2021		Shaheen Afridi	Pakistan	Joe Root (England) §; Mohammad Rizwan (Pakistan) §; Kane Williamson (New Zealand) §	Also named in the Test Team of the Year and T20I Team of the Year	
2022		Babar Azam	Pakistan	Ben Stokes (England) §; Sikandar Raza (Zimbabwe) §; Tim Southee (New Zealand) §	Also named in the Test Team of the Year, named ODI Player of the Year and captain of the ODI Team of the Year	
2023		Pat Cummins	Australia	Travis Head (Australia) §; Virat Kohli (India) §; Ravindra Jadeja (India) §	Also named captain of the Test Team of the Year	
2024		Jasprit Bumrah	India	Harry Brook (England) §; Travis Head (Australia) §; Joe Root (England) §	Also named the Test Cricketer of the Year, and named in the Test Team of the Year and T20I Team of the Year	

== Superlatives ==
=== Wins by player ===
Player	Winner
(Australia) Ricky Ponting	2 (2006, 2007)
(Australia) Mitchell Johnson	2 (2009, 2014)
(India) Virat Kohli	2 (2017, 2018)
(India) Rahul Dravid	1 (2004)
(South Africa) Jacques Kallis	1 (2005)
(England) Andrew Flintoff	1 (2005)
(Cricket West Indies) Shivnarine Chanderpaul	1 (2008)
(India) Sachin Tendulkar	1 (2010)
(England) Jonathan Trott	1 (2011)
(Sri Lanka) Kumar Sangakkara	1 (2012)
(Australia) Michael Clarke	1 (2013)
(Australia) Steve Smith	1 (2015)
(India) Ravichandran Ashwin	1 (2016)
(England) Ben Stokes	1 (2019)
(Pakistan) Shaheen Afridi	1 (2021)
(Pakistan) Babar Azam	1 (2022)
(Australia) Pat Cummins	1 (2023)
(India) Jasprit Bumrah	1 (2024)

=== Wins by country ===
Country	Players	Total
Australia	5	7
India	5	6
England	3	3
Pakistan	2	2
South Africa	1	1
West Indies	1	1
Sri Lanka	1	1

== See also ==
- ICC Women's Cricketer of the Year
- ICC Test Player of the Year
- ICC ODI Player of the Year
