= Aleem Dar =

Pakistani cricket umpire

Aleem Dar PP
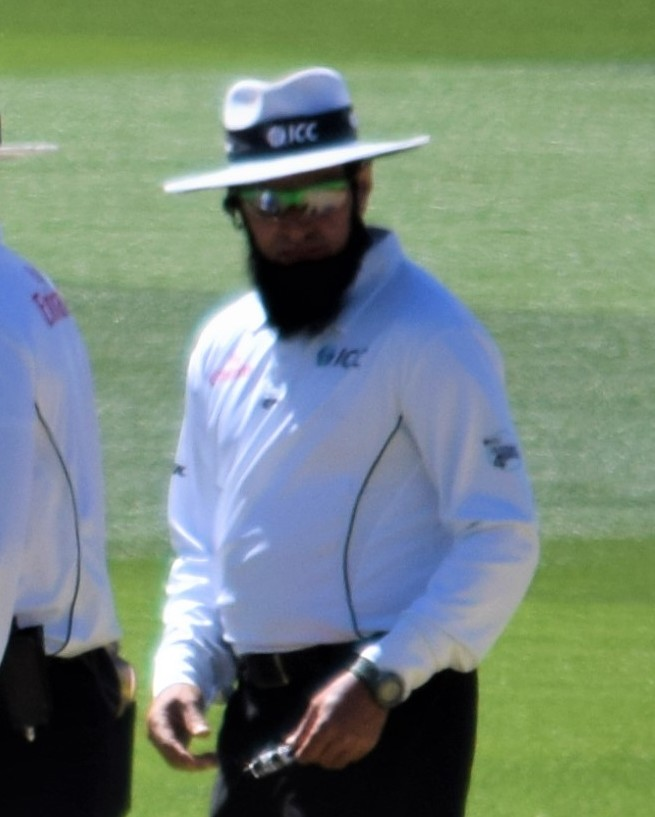
- Dar umpiring during the 2017–18 Ashes

Personal information
- Full name: Aleem Sarwar Dar
- Born: 6 June 1968 (age 58); Jhang, Punjab, Pakistan
- Batting: Right-handed
- Bowling: Right-arm leg spin
- Role: Umpire

Domestic team information
- Years: Team
- 1986–2009: Pakistan Railways
- 1988–1995: Lahore City
- 1995: Allied Bank Limited
- 1997–1998: Gujranwala
- FC debut: 8 February 1987 Pakistan Railways v ADBP
- Last FC: 6 December 1997 Gujranwala v Bahawalpur
- LA debut: 29 September 1986 Pakistan Railways v United Bank Limited
- Last LA: 23 March 1998 Gujranwala v Malaysia

Umpiring information
- Tests umpired: 145 (2003–2023)
- ODIs umpired: 231 (2000–2023)
- T20Is umpired: 72 (2009–2023)
- WT20Is umpired: 5 (2009–2016)

Career statistics
Competition	FC	LA
Matches	17	18
Runs scored	270	179
Batting average	11.73	19.88
100s/50s	0/0	0/0
Top score	39	37
Balls bowled	740	634
Wickets	11	15
Bowling average	34.36	31.66
5 wickets in innings	0	0
10 wickets in match	0	0
Best bowling	3/19	3/27
Catches/stumpings	5/–	17/–
- Source: ESPNcricinfo, 24 June 2023

Aleem Dar PP (Punjabi, Urdu: علیم ڈار; born 6 June 1968) is a Pakistani cricket umpire and former first-class cricketer. He is a former member of the Elite Panel of ICC Umpires. Dar won the David Shepherd Trophy three years in a row from 2009 to 2011, after being nominated twice in 2005 and 2006. Aleem Dar, Marais Erasmus, Richard Kettleborough, Kumar Dharmasena and Simon Taufel were the only umpires to have received the award from its inception until 2017. Before becoming an umpire, Dar played first-class cricket as a right-handed batsman and a leg-break bowler for Allied Bank, Gujranwala, Lahore and Pakistan Railways teams. Dar is also a member of the Men's National Selection Committee of the Pakistan Cricket Board. He was educated at Government Islamia College, Civil Lines, Lahore.

In December 2019, in the first match of the series between Australia and New Zealand, Aleem stood in his 129th Test match, breaking the record previously set by Steve Bucknor. On 1 November 2020, in the second ODI between Pakistan and Zimbabwe, Aleem stood in his 210th ODI match as an on-field umpire, surpassing South African Rudi Koertzen's record of officiating in the most ODI matches.

== Personal life ==
Aleem Dar was born on June 6, 1968, in Jhang, Pakistan. He is married to Noshaba. They have three children, sons Hassan and Ali, and a daughter, Jaweria, who died due to epilepsy.

== Career ==
=== Umpiring ===
Aleem is best known as an international cricket umpire. He made his international umpiring debut in an ODI between Pakistan and Sri Lanka at Gujranwala on 16 February 2000. In 2002, he became a member of International Panel of ICC Umpires. He was chosen to umpire at the 2003 Cricket World Cup.

In April 2004, he became the first Pakistani to be part of the Elite Panel of ICC Umpires. He was nominated for the ICC Umpire of the year Award in 2005 and 2006, beaten on both occasions by the Australian Simon Taufel. On 17 October 2007, Aleem umpired in his 100th ODI, between India and Australia at Mumbai, making him the tenth umpire in the history of cricket to reach that landmark. He reached the landmark in a record time, taking just seven years, and became the first Pakistani to officiate in a century of One Day Internationals.

Aleem has stood in a solitary India-Pakistan ODI match at Karachi 2006 and five Ashes Test matches. He was also one of the on-field umpires for the final of the 2006 ICC Champions Trophy, standing alongside Rudi Koertzen. He stood in the final of the 2007 Cricket World Cup between Australia and Sri Lanka, along with Steve Bucknor. Dar was also selected to stand in the final of the 2010 ICC World Twenty20 between Australia and England .

In January 2005, Aleem and his colleague Steve Bucknor, received death threats during a Test match between England and South Africa at Centurion. He was also involved in a controversy during the 2007 Cricket World Cup final where he, along with fellow officials Bucknor, Koertzen, Bowden and Crowe incorrectly made Australia bowl three unnecessary overs in near darkness. Consequently, the ICC decided to suspend him, along with the other four officials, from duty for the next ICC event, which was the 2007 World Twenty20 Championship.

Aleem proved his accuracy at the 2011 Cricket World Cup when all the 15 Umpire Decision Review System appeals against him were struck down.

He was selected as one of the twenty umpires to stand in matches during the 2015 Cricket World Cup. In April 2019, he was named as one of the sixteen umpires to stand in matches during the 2019 Cricket World Cup. The following month, in the second match of the 2019 Ireland Tri-Nation Series, he became the third umpire, and first from Pakistan, to officiate in 200 ODIs.

On 16 March 2023, Dar stepped down from the elite panel of umpires after a 19-year career. He will still umpire games if the PCB selects him to stand in games played in Pakistan.

From 5–7 April 2023, he stood in his last test match as an Elite panel umpire, during the one-off test between Bangladesh and Ireland. At the end of the match, he also received a Guard of Honor from both teams and a memento was presented to him by Bangladesh Cricket Board.

He announced he will retire from umpiring at the end of the Pakistan Cricket Board's 2024–25 domestic season.

=== Aleem Dar Cricket Academy ===
Aleem Dar Cricket Academy, ADCA is a training and coaching academy for hearing-impaired boys and girls. It is located in Lahore, Pakistan. It is equipped with a ground, gymnasium, jogging track and basketball court. Aleem Dar established the academy in 2013.

=== Dar's Delighto ===
In 2018, he started a restaurant named Dar's Delighto in PIA Cooperative Housing Society, Lahore.

=== Post-retirement ===
In October 2024, the Pakistan Cricket Board named Dar as part of its selection committee.

== Accolades ==
After being nominated twice in 2005 and 2006, Aleem finally won the Umpire of the Year award in October 2009, at the annual ICC awards ceremony in Johannesburg, South Africa. By claiming the award, Aleem ended Simon Taufel's run of five successive awards. It was the first time that any umpire other than Taufel had picked up the accolade in the six years that the ceremony had taken place. In October 2010, he won the award for a second straight year. In September 2011, he was named best umpire for the third consecutive year. On 14 August 2010, the Government of Pakistan honoured him with the President's Award for Pride of Performance.

He was honoured by ICC for officiating in 150 ODIs.

== See also ==
- List of Test cricket umpires
- List of One Day International cricket umpires
- List of Twenty20 International cricket umpires
