= 2007 ICC Awards =

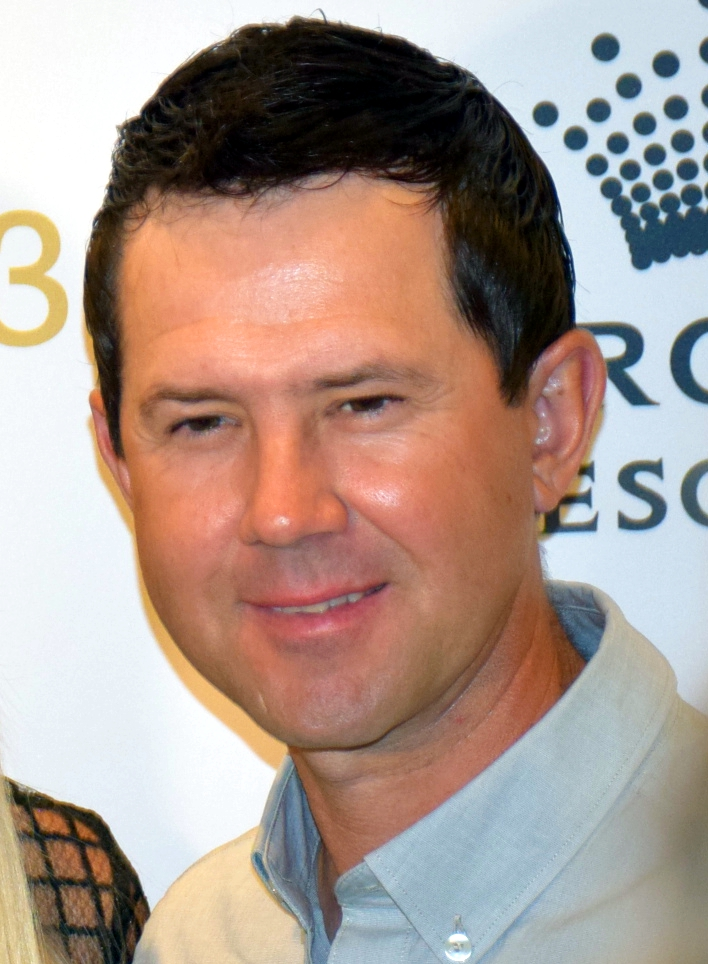
- 2007 Cricketer of the Year Ricky Ponting
- Date: 10 September 2007
- Presented by: ICC

Highlights
- Cricketer of the Year: (Australia) Ricky Ponting (2nd award)
- Test Player of the Year: (Pakistan) Mohammad Yousuf (1st award)
- ODI Player of the Year: (Australia) Matthew Hayden (1st award)
- Emerging Player of the Year: (Australia) Shaun Tait
- Website: www.icc-cricket.com

The 2007 ICC Awards were held on 10 September 2007 in Johannesburg, South Africa. Previous events were held in London (2004), Sydney (2005) and Mumbai (2006). Having been hosted since 2004, the ICC Awards were now into their fourth year. They were presented in association with the Federation of International Cricketers' Associations (FICA) and honours for Associate Player of the Year were also awarded for the first time. The ICC awards the Sir Garfield Sobers Trophy to the Cricketer of the Year, which is considered to be the most prestigious award in world cricket.

== Selection Committee ==
Nominees were voted on by a 56-member academy of current and ex-players and officials from among players chosen by the ICC Selection Committee, chaired by ICC Cricket Hall of Famer Sunil Gavaskar.

Selection Committee members:

- (India) Sunil Gavaskar (chairman)
- (New Zealand) Chris Cairns
- (South Africa) Gary Kirsten
- (Pakistan) Iqbal Qasim
- (England) Alec Stewart

== Winners and nominees ==
The winners and nominees of various individual awards were:

=== Cricketer of the Year ===
- Winner: Ricky Ponting (Aus)
- Nominees: Shivnarine Chanderpaul (WI), Matthew Hayden (Aus), Michael Hussey (Aus), Mahela Jayawardene (SL), Jacques Kallis (SA), Glenn McGrath (Aus), Muttiah Muralitharan (SL), Kevin Pietersen (Eng), Shaun Pollock (SA), Kumar Sangakkara (SL), Mohammad Yousuf (Pak)

=== Test Player of the Year ===
- Winner: Mohammad Yousuf (Pak)
- Nominees: Mohammad Asif (Pak), Shivnarine Chanderpaul (WI), Stuart Clark (Aus), Matthew Hayden (Aus), Michael Hussey (Aus), Mahela Jayawardene (SL), Zaheer Khan (Ind), Anil Kumble (Ind), Brian Lara (WI), Glenn McGrath (Aus), Muttiah Muralitharan (SL), Makhaya Ntini (SA), Monty Panesar (Eng), Kevin Pietersen (Eng), Shaun Pollock (SA), Ricky Ponting (Aus), Kumar Sangakkara (SL), Ryan Sidebottom (Eng), Shane Warne (Aus)

=== ODI Player of the Year ===
- Winner: Matthew Hayden (Aus)
- Nominees: Shane Bond (NZ), Mark Boucher (SA), Nathan Bracken (Aus), Shivnarine Chanderpaul (WI), Stuart Clark (Aus), Michael Clarke (Aus), Michael Hussey (Aus), Mahela Jayawardene (SL), Jacques Kallis (SA), Brett Lee (Aus), Glenn McGrath (Aus), Muttiah Muralitharan (SL), Jacob Oram (NZ), Kevin Pietersen (Eng), Shaun Pollock (SA), Ricky Ponting (Aus), Kumar Sangakkara (SL), Yuvraj Singh (Ind), Mohammad Yousuf (Pak)

=== Emerging Player of the Year ===
- Winner: Shaun Tait (Aus)
- Nominees: Ravi Bopara (Eng), Shakib Al Hasan (Ban), Mitchell Johnson (Aus), Mushfiqur Rahim (Ban), Ross Taylor (NZ), Chris Tremlett (Eng)

=== Associate Player of the Year ===
- Winner: Thomas Odoyo (Ken)
- Nominees: Ashish Bagai (Can), Andre Botha (Ire), John Davison (Can), Trent Johnston (Ire), Dwayne Leverock (Ber), Kyle McCallan (Ire), Tanmay Mishra (Ken), Eoin Morgan (Ire), Asif Mulla (Can), Niall O'Brien (Ire), Peter Ongondo (Ken), Irving Romaine (Ber), Abdool Samad (Can), Ryan ten Doeschate (Nth), Steve Tikolo (Ken), Hiren Varaiya (Ken), Ryan Watson (Sco)

=== Umpire of the Year ===
- Winner: Simon Taufel (Aus)
- Nominees: Mark Benson (Eng), Steve Bucknor (WI), Daryl Harper (Aus)

=== Captain of the Year ===
- Winner: Ricky Ponting (Aus)
- Nominee: Mahela Jayawardene (SL)

=== Women's Cricketer of the Year ===
- Winner: Jhulan Goswami (Ind)
- Nominees: Caitriona Beggs (Ire), Holly Colvin (Eng), Rumeli Dhar (Ind), Maria Fahey (NZ), Ashlyn Kilowan (SA), Johmari Logtenberg (SA), Urooj Mumtaz (Pak), Shelley Nitschke (Aus), Rebecca Rolls (NZ), Sajjida Shah (Pak), Lisa Sthalekar (Aus), Claire Taylor (Eng)

=== Spirit of Cricket ===
- Sri Lanka

== ICC World XI Teams ==
=== ICC Test Team of the Year ===
Ricky Ponting was selected as the captain of the Test Team of the Year. In addition to a wicket-keeper, 9 other players and a 12th man were announced as follows:

- (Australia) Matthew Hayden
- (England) Michael Vaughan
- (Australia) Ricky Ponting
- (Pakistan) Mohammad Yousuf
- (England) Kevin Pietersen
- (Australia) Michael Hussey
- (Sri Lanka) Kumar Sangakkara (wicket-keeper)
- (Australia) Stuart Clark
- (South Africa) Makhaya Ntini
- (Pakistan) Mohammad Asif
- (Sri Lanka) Muttiah Muralitharan
- (India) Zaheer Khan (12th man)

=== ICC ODI Team of the Year ===
Ricky Ponting was also selected as the captain of the ODI Team of the Year. In addition to a wicket-keeper, 9 other players and a 12th man were announced as follows:

- (Australia) Matthew Hayden
- (India) Sachin Tendulkar
- (Australia) Ricky Ponting
- (England) Kevin Pietersen
- (Cricket West Indies) Shivnarine Chanderpaul
- (South Africa) Jacques Kallis
- (South Africa) Mark Boucher (wicket-keeper)
- (Sri Lanka) Chaminda Vaas
- (New Zealand) Shane Bond
- (Sri Lanka) Muttiah Muralitharan
- (Australia) Glenn McGrath
- (Australia) Michael Hussey (12th man)

== Short lists ==
=== Cricketer of the Year ===
- (Cricket West Indies) Shivnarine Chanderpaul
- (England) Kevin Pietersen
- (Australia) Ricky Ponting
- (Pakistan) Mohammad Yousuf

=== Test Player of the Year ===
- (Sri Lanka) Muttiah Muralitharan
- (England) Kevin Pietersen
- (Australia) Ricky Ponting
- (Pakistan) Mohammad Yousuf

=== ODI Player of the Year ===
- (Australia) Matthew Hayden
- (South Africa) Jacques Kallis
- (Australia) Glenn McGrath
- (Australia) Ricky Ponting

=== Emerging Player of the Year ===
- (England) Ravi Bopara
- (Bangladesh) Shakib Al Hasan
- (Australia) Shaun Tait
- (New Zealand) Ross Taylor

=== Associate Player of the Year ===
- (Canada) Ashish Bagai
- (Netherlands) Ryan ten Doeschate
- (Kenya) Thomas Odoyo
- (Kenya) Steve Tikolo

=== Umpire of the Year ===
- (England) Mark Benson
- (Cricket West Indies) Steve Bucknor
- (Australia) Simon Taufel

=== Women's Cricketer of the Year ===
- (India) Jhulan Goswami
- (Australia) Lisa Sthalekar
- (England) Claire Taylor

=== Spirit of Cricket ===
- Australia
- Ireland
- New Zealand
- Sri Lanka

== See also ==
- International Cricket Council
- ICC Awards
- Sir Garfield Sobers Trophy (Cricketer of the Year)
- ICC Test Player of the Year
- ICC ODI Player of the Year
- David Shepherd Trophy (Umpire of the Year)
- ICC Women's Cricketer of the Year
- ICC Test Team of the Year
- ICC ODI Team of the Year
