= 2005 ICC Awards =

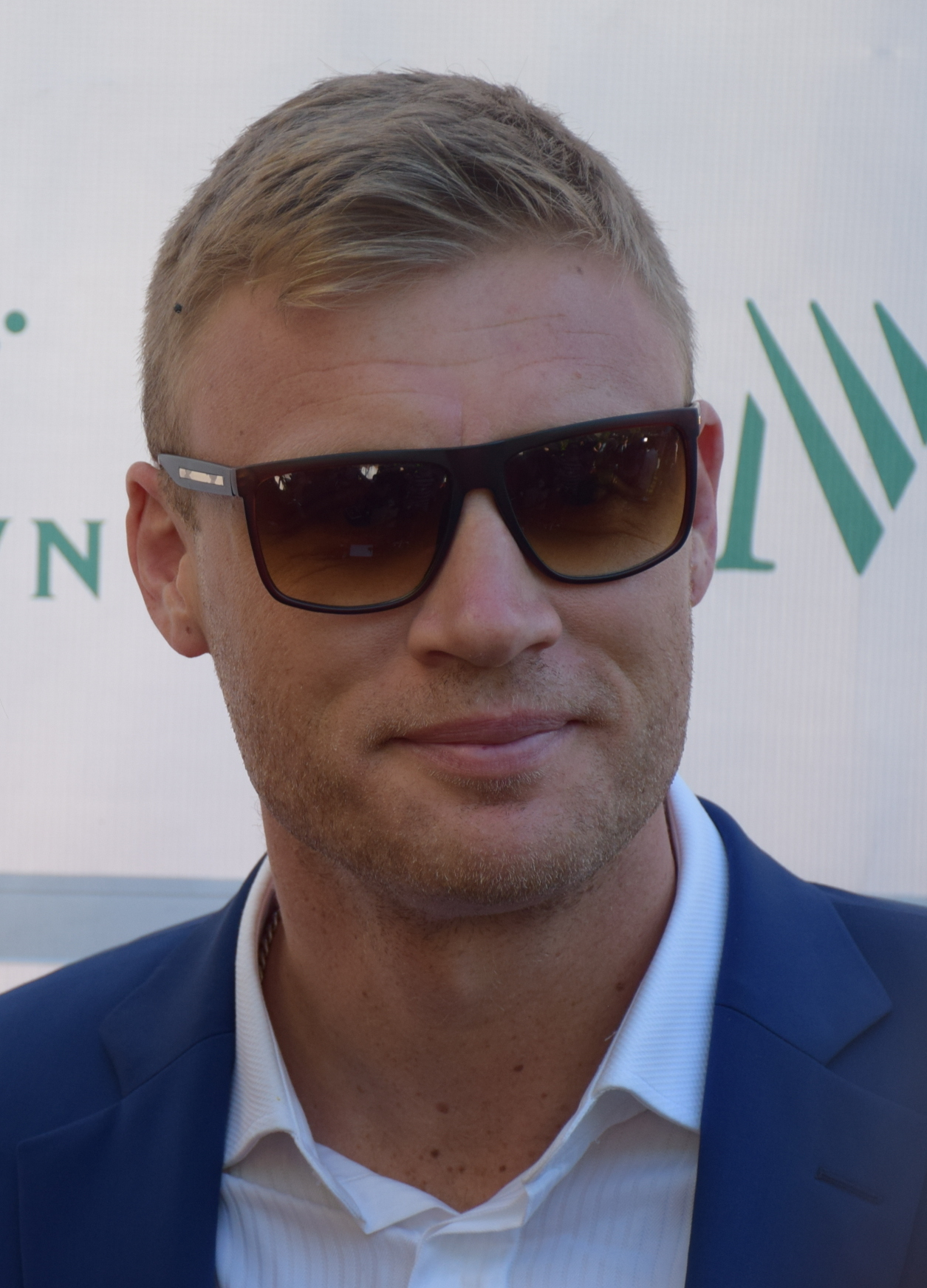
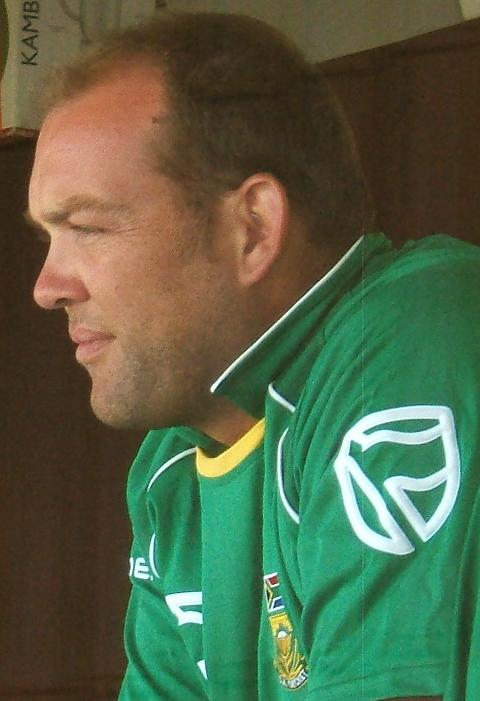
- 2005 Cricketers of the Year Andrew Flintoff (top) and Jacques Kallis (bottom)
- Date: 11 October 2005
- Presented by: ICC

Highlights
- Cricketer of the Year: (England) Andrew Flintoff (1st award) (South Africa) Jacques Kallis (1st award)
- Test Player of the Year: (South Africa) Jacques Kallis (1st award)
- ODI Player of the Year: (England) Kevin Pietersen (1st award)
- Emerging Player of the Year: (England) Kevin Pietersen
- Website: www.icc-cricket.com

The 2005 ICC Awards were held at the Four Seasons Hotel in Sydney, Australia on 11 October 2005. The judging period covered was from 1 August 2004 to 31 July 2005. This did not include the whole of the 2005 Ashes series, since the final four matches of this series were played in August and September. In association with the Federation of International Cricketers' Associations (FICA), the awards were presented by Hyundai at a function during the Super Series between champions Australia and the ICC World XI.

== Selection Committee ==
Nominees were voted on by a 50-member academy of current and ex-players and officials from among players chosen by the ICC Selection Committee, chaired by ICC Cricket Hall of Famer Sunil Gavaskar.

Selection Committee members:

- (India) Sunil Gavaskar (chairman)
- (England) David Gower
- (New Zealand) Richard Hadlee
- (Australia) Rod Marsh
- (Cricket West Indies) Courtney Walsh

== Winners and nominees ==
The winners and nominees of various individual awards were:

=== Cricketer of the Year ===
- Winners: Andrew Flintoff (Eng) and Jacques Kallis (SA)
- Nominees: Rahul Dravid (Ind), Inzamam-ul-Haq (Pak), Adam Gilchrist (Aus), Glenn McGrath (Aus), Ricky Ponting (Aus)

=== Test Player of the Year ===
- Winner: Jacques Kallis (SA)
- Nominees: Shivnarine Chanderpaul (WI), Adam Gilchrist (Aus), Inzamam-ul-Haq (Pak), Younis Khan (Pak), Brian Lara (WI), Damien Martyn (Aus), Anil Kumble (Ind), Glenn McGrath (Aus), Ricky Ponting (Aus), Danish Kaneria (Pak), Kumar Sangakkara (SL), Virender Sehwag (Ind), Harbhajan Singh (Ind), Shane Warne (Aus)

=== ODI Player of the Year ===
- Winner: Kevin Pietersen (Eng)
- Nominees: Rahul Dravid (Ind), Andrew Flintoff (Eng), Herschelle Gibbs (SA), Adam Gilchrist (Aus), Inzamam-ul-Haq (Pak), Brett Lee (Aus), Glenn McGrath (Aus), Justin Kemp (SA), Shoaib Malik (Pak), Daniel Vettori (NZ), Ricky Ponting (Aus), Kumar Sangakkara (SL), Graeme Smith (SA), Andrew Symonds (Aus), Marcus Trescothick (Eng), Chaminda Vaas (SL), Yousuf Youhana (Pak)

=== Emerging Player of the Year ===
- Winner: Kevin Pietersen (Eng)
- Nominees: Aftab Ahmed (Ban), Ian Bell (Eng), Gautam Gambhir (Ind), Dinesh Karthik (Ind), Manjural Islam Rana (Ban), AB de Villiers (SA)

=== Umpire of the Year ===
- Winner: Simon Taufel (Aus)

=== Spirit of Cricket ===
- Winner: England

== ICC World XI Teams ==
=== ICC Test Team of the Year ===
Ricky Ponting was selected as the captain of the Test Team of the Year. In addition to a wicket-keeper, 9 other players and a 12th man were announced as follows:

- (India) Virender Sehwag
- (South Africa) Graeme Smith
- (Australia) Ricky Ponting
- (South Africa) Jacques Kallis
- (Cricket West Indies) Brian Lara
- (Pakistan) Inzamam-ul-Haq
- (England) Andrew Flintoff
- (Australia) Adam Gilchrist (wicket-keeper)
- (Australia) Shane Warne
- (Sri Lanka) Chaminda Vaas
- (Australia) Glenn McGrath
- (India) Anil Kumble (12th man)

=== ICC ODI Team of the Year ===
Marvan Atapattu was selected as the captain of the ODI Team of the Year. In addition to a wicket-keeper, 9 other players and a 12th man were announced as follows:

- (Sri Lanka) Marvan Atapattu
- (Australia) Adam Gilchrist (wicket-keeper)
- (India) Rahul Dravid
- (England) Kevin Pietersen
- (Pakistan) Inzamam-ul-Haq
- (England) Andrew Flintoff
- (Australia) Andrew Symonds
- (New Zealand) Daniel Vettori
- (Australia) Brett Lee
- (Pakistan) Naved-ul-Hasan
- (Australia) Glenn McGrath
- (South Africa) Jacques Kallis (12th man)

== Short lists ==
=== Cricketer of the Year ===
- (England) Andrew Flintoff
- (Australia) Adam Gilchrist
- (Pakistan) Inzamam-ul-Haq
- (South Africa) Jacques Kallis
- (Australia) Glenn McGrath

=== Test Player of the Year ===
- (Australia) Adam Gilchrist
- (Pakistan) Inzamam-ul-Haq
- (South Africa) Jacques Kallis
- (Australia) Glenn McGrath
- (Australia) Shane Warne

=== ODI Player of the Year ===
- (England) Andrew Flintoff
- (Australia) Adam Gilchrist
- (Australia) Brett Lee
- (England) Kevin Pietersen
- (Australia) Andrew Symonds

=== Emerging Player of the Year ===
- (Bangladesh) Aftab Ahmed
- (England) Ian Bell
- (India) Dinesh Karthik
- (England) Kevin Pietersen
- (South Africa) AB de Villiers

== See also ==
- International Cricket Council
- ICC Awards
- Sir Garfield Sobers Trophy (Cricketer of the Year)
- ICC Test Player of the Year
- ICC ODI Player of the Year
- David Shepherd Trophy (Umpire of the Year)
- ICC Women's Cricketer of the Year
- ICC Test Team of the Year
- ICC ODI Team of the Year
