= World Cricketers' Association =

Players' association in professional cricket

- Abbreviation: WCA
- Website: theworldca.com

World Cricketers' Association (WCA), formerly known as the Federation of International Cricketers' Associations (FICA), is the global representative body for professional cricketers in cricket. It represents players from most of the leading cricket-playing nations through their domestic players’ associations, with more than 600 international players involved in its global commercial programmes.

The WCA operates as a democratic, player-led organisation that unites the world’s professional cricketers under a single international entity, focusing on matters that affect players collectively and the global game.

Originally established as FICA in 1998, the organisation adopted the name World Cricketers’ Association (WCA) in 2024.

In March 2025, the WCA released a report advocating reform of the international cricket calendar and the modernisation of the International Cricket Council.

== WCA members ==
| Country | Association |
|---|---|
| Australia | Australian Cricketers' Association (ACA) |
| Bangladesh | Cricketers Welfare Association of Bangladesh |
| England and Wales | Professional Cricketers' Association (PCA) |
| Ireland | Irish Cricketers' Association |
| The Netherlands | Dutch Cricketers' Association |
| New Zealand | New Zealand Cricket Players Association |
| Scotland | Scottish Cricketers' Association |
| South Africa | South African Cricketers' Association |
| United States | United States Cricketers' Association |
| West Indies | West Indies Players' Association (WIPA) |
| Afghanistan | Afghanistan Players - Direct |
| Zimbabwe | Zimbabwe Players - Direct |
| Canada | Canada Players - Direct |
| Namibia | Namibia Players - Direct |
| Uganda | Uganda Players - Direct |

== Current officers ==
| Name | Nationality |
President
| Lisa Sthalekar | Australia |
Chairman
| Heath Mills | New Zealand |
Chief Executive
| Tom Moffat | Australia |
Board
| Andrew Breetzke | South Africa |
| Wavell Hinds | West Indies |
| Heath Mills | New Zealand |
| Debabrata Paul | Bangladesh |
| Paul Marsh | Australia |
| Daryl Mitchell | England |
| Kenny Godsman | Scotland |
| Cecelia Joyce | Ireland |
| Paul van Meekeren | Netherlands |
| Sana Mir | Pakistan |
| Tony Irish | South Africa |
| Corey Anderson | USA |
