= ICC Women's Cricketer of the Year =

International cricket annual award

ICC Award for Best Women's Cricketer
- Presented by: ICC
- First award: 2006
- Currently held by: (New Zealand) Amelia Kerr

Highlights
- Most awards: (Australia) Ellyse Perry (India) Smriti Mandhana (England) Nat Sciver-Brunt (2 each)
- Website: ICC Awards

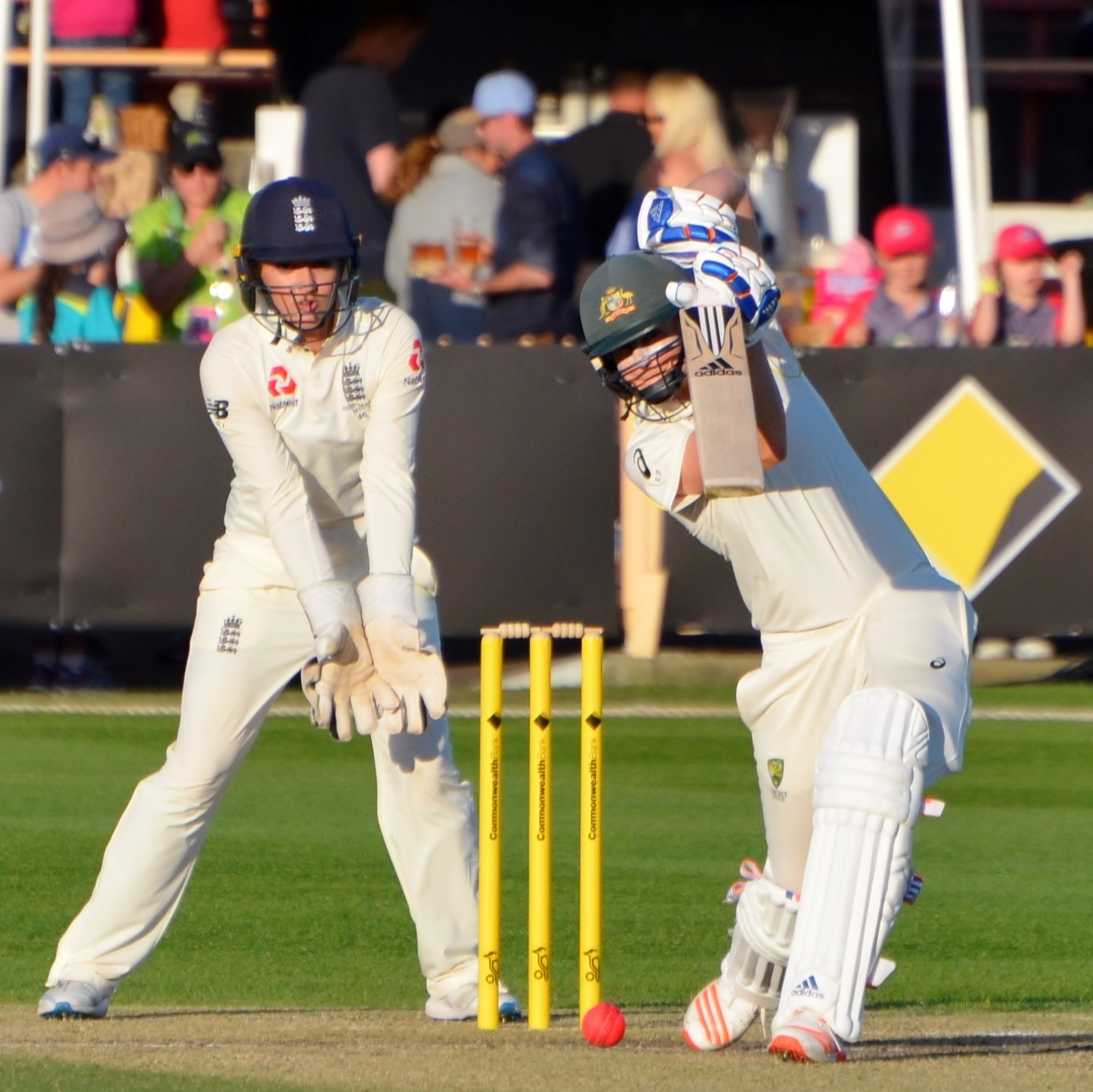
Sarah Taylor (left) and Ellyse Perry (right) have collectively won a total of nine awards across all three categories.

The International Cricket Council (ICC) Women's Cricketer of the Year (known as the Rachael Heyhoe Flint Award since 2017 in memory of pioneering women's cricket player and administrator Rachael Heyhoe Flint) is an award given annually as part of the ICC Awards ceremony.

Introduced in 2006, the award adjudges the best-performed female international cricketer across an approximate twelve-month voting period. Prior to 2009, each of the top ten women's national teams nominated two players and the final selection was made by a 16-person panel. Since 2009, a long list has been chosen by the ICC Awards voting panel, consisting of cricket administrators, journalists and former players. A subsequent short list is then created by a different, 25-person, board.

Between 2006 and 2011, the award ran as a single category, known as the Women's Player of the Year. From 2012 to 2016, it was separated into two format-specific categories: the Women's ODI Player of the Year and Women's T20I Player of the Year awards. In 2017, an overall Women's Cricketer of the Year category was reintroduced, though the separate awards for One Day and Twenty20 cricket would continue to be presented.

In December 2020, after a reduced amount of international cricket had been played throughout the previous twelve months due to the COVID-19 pandemic, the ICC staged a special edition of its annual awards ceremony to recognise the best players of the past ten years. Australian all-rounder Ellyse Perry swept all three major female categories to be named the Women's ODI Player of the Decade, Women's T20I Player of the Decade and overall Women's Cricketer of the Decade. Perry has received the most awards across all three categories with a total of six wins.

== Winners ==
=== ICC Women's Cricketer of the Year ===
Year	Winner	Team	Short listed	Ref(s)
2006	Karen Rolton	Australia	Katherine Brunt (England); Anjum Chopra (India)	
2007	Jhulan Goswami	India	Lisa Sthalekar (Australia); Claire Taylor (England)	
2008	Charlotte Edwards	England	Nicola Browne (New Zealand); Lisa Sthalekar (Australia); Claire Taylor (England)	
2009	Claire Taylor	England	Charlotte Edwards (England); Shelley Nitschke (Australia)	
2010	Shelley Nitschke	Australia	Katherine Brunt (England); Ellyse Perry (Australia); Stafanie Taylor (West Indies)	
2011	Stafanie Taylor	West Indies	Charlotte Edwards (England); Lydia Greenway (England); Shelley Nitschke (Australia)	

Rachael Heyhoe Flint Award
Year	Winner	Team	Short listed	Ref(s)
2017	Ellyse Perry	Australia		
2018	Smriti Mandhana	India		
2019	Ellyse Perry	Australia		
2021	Smriti Mandhana	India	Tammy Beaumont (England); Lizelle Lee (South Africa); Gaby Lewis (Ireland)	
2022	Nat Sciver-Brunt	England	Amelia Kerr (New Zealand); Smriti Mandhana (India); Beth Mooney (Australia)	
2023	Nat Sciver-Brunt	England	Chamari Athapaththu (Sri Lanka); Ashleigh Gardner (Australia); Beth Mooney (Australia)	
2024	Amelia Kerr	New Zealand	Chamari Athapaththu (Sri Lanka); Annabel Sutherland (Australia); Laura Wolvaardt (South Africa)	

=== ICC Women's ODI Cricketer of the Year ===
Year	Winner	Team	Short listed	Ref(s)
2012	Stafanie Taylor	West Indies	Anisa Mohammed (West Indies); Lydia Greenway (England); Sarah Taylor (England)	
2013	Suzie Bates	New Zealand	Charlotte Edwards (England); Meg Lanning (Australia); Dane van Niekerk (South Africa); Anya Shrubsole (England); Stafanie Taylor (West Indies)	
2014	Sarah Taylor	England	Charlotte Edwards (England); Mithali Raj (India); Stafanie Taylor (West Indies)	
2015	Meg Lanning	Australia		
2016	Suzie Bates	New Zealand		
2017	Amy Satterthwaite	New Zealand		
2018	Smriti Mandhana	India		
2019	Ellyse Perry	Australia		
2021	Lizelle Lee	South Africa	Tammy Beaumont (England); Hayley Matthews (West Indies); Fatima Sana (Pakistan)	
2022	Nat Sciver-Brunt	England	Shabnim Ismail (South Africa); Amelia Kerr (New Zealand); Alyssa Healy (Australia)	
2023	Chamari Athapaththu	Sri Lanka	Ashleigh Gardner (Australia); Nat Sciver (England); Amelia Kerr (New Zealand)	
2024	Smriti Mandhana	India	Chamari Athapaththu (Sri Lanka); Annabel Sutherland (Australia); Laura Wolvaardt (South Africa)	

=== ICC Women's T20I Cricketer of the Year ===
Year	Winner	Team	Short listed	Ref(s)
2012	Sarah Taylor	England	Stafanie Taylor (West Indies); Alyssa Healy (Australia); Lisa Sthalekar (Australia)	
2013	Sarah Taylor	England	Suzie Bates (New Zealand); Shanel Daley (West Indies); Deandra Dottin (West Indies); Meg Lanning (Australia); Stafanie Taylor (West Indies)	
2014	Meg Lanning	Australia	Charlotte Edwards (England); Mithali Raj (India); Stafanie Taylor (West Indies)	
2015	Stafanie Taylor	West Indies		
2016	Suzie Bates	New Zealand		
2017	Beth Mooney	Australia		
2018	Alyssa Healy	Australia	Suzie Bates (New Zealand); Meg Lanning (Australia)	
2019	Alyssa Healy	Australia		
2021	Tammy Beaumont	England	Gaby Lewis (Ireland); Smriti Mandhana (India); Natalie Sciver (England)	
2022	Tahlia McGrath	Australia	Smriti Mandhana (India); Nida Dar (Pakistan); Sophie Devine (New Zealand)	
2023	Hayley Matthews	West Indies	Ellyse Perry (Australia); Sophie Ecclestone (England)	
2024	Amelia Kerr	New Zealand	Chamari Athapaththu (Sri Lanka); Orla Prendergast (Ireland); Laura Wolvaardt (South Africa)	

=== ICC Women's Emerging Cricketer of the Year ===
Year	Winner
2017	(Australia) Beth Mooney
2018	(England) Sophie Ecclestone
2019	(Thailand) Chanida Sutthiruang
2021	(Pakistan) Fatima Sana
2022	(India) Renuka Singh Thakur
2023	(Australia) Phoebe Litchfield
2024	(South Africa) Annerie Dercksen

=== ICC Women's Associate Player of the Year ===
Year	Winner
2021	(Austria) Andrea-Mae Zepeda
2022	(United Arab Emirates) Esha Oza
2023	(Kenya) Queentor Abel
2024	(United Arab Emirates) Esha Oza

=== ICC Women's Cricketer of the Decade ===
Year	Winner	Team	Short listed	Ref(s)
Women's Cricketer of the Decade	Ellyse Perry	Australia	Suzie Bates (New Zealand); Meg Lanning (Australia); Mithali Raj (India); Sarah Taylor (England); Stafanie Taylor (West Indies)	
Women's ODI Player of the Decade	Ellyse Perry	Australia	Suzie Bates (New Zealand); Mithali Raj (India); Stafanie Taylor (West Indies); Jhulan Goswami (India); Meg Lanning (Australia)	
Women's T20I Player of the Decade	Ellyse Perry	Australia	Sophie Devine (New Zealand); Deandra Dottin (West Indies); Alyssa Healy (Australia); Meg Lanning (Australia); Anya Shrubsole (England)	

== See also ==
- ICC Awards
- Sir Garfield Sobers Trophy
- ICC Test Player of the Year
- ICC ODI Player of the Year
