= CCR =

CCR may stand for:

== Arts and entertainment ==
=== Music ===
- Creedence Clearwater Revival, an American rock band
  - Creedence Clearwater Revival (album), the 1968 debut album by Creedence Clearwater Revival
- Creedence Clearwater Revisited, a rock band formed in 1995 by two former Creedence Clearwater Revival members
- Cross Canadian Ragweed, an American country music band

=== Other uses in arts and entertainment ===
- ChuChu Rocket!, a puzzle game for the Sega Dreamcast developed by Sonic Team in 1999
- Yasuo Motoki, a fictional character in Wangan Midnight

== Law and prisons ==
- California Code of Regulations, formerly the California Government Code
- Center for Constitutional Rights, formerly the Emergency Civil Liberties Committee, a non-profit dedicated to civil and human rights law
- Constitutional Court of Romania
- Court for Crown Cases Reserved (abbreviation CCR is used in case citations)
- Covenants, Conditions, and Restrictions
- Closed cell restricted or solitary confinement

== Organizations ==
- Canadian Council for Refugees, a non-governmental organization that critiques the Government of Canada's public policy regarding refugee settlement and determination
- Center for Cerebrovascular Research, A UCSF research organization specializing in cerebrovascular disease
- Center for Constitutional Rights, a non-profit legal advocacy organization
- Centre for Cross-cultural Research at the Australian National University, 1997–2008?
- Chelmsford City Racecourse, a horse racing course in Essex, UK
- Cistercian College, Roscrea, a Catholic boarding school for boys
- Citizens for a Canadian Republic, an anti-monarchy group in Canada
- Coláiste Chríost Rí, a Catholic secondary school for boys in Cork, Ireland
- Colonial Christian Republic, a United States right-wing Christian militia group
- Communität Casteller Ring, a German Lutheran religious order for women
- Rangpur Cadet College, Rangpur, Bangladesh
- League for Catholic Counter-Reformation

== Science and technology ==
=== Biology and medicine ===
- C-C motif receptor, beta chemokine receptor
- Cannabis and Cannabinoid Research, a peer-reviewed academic journal discussing medical cannabis, cannabinoids, and endocannabinoids
- Cardiocerebral resuscitation, a variation of Cardiopulmonary Resuscitation
- Carbon catabolite repression, part of the adaptive metabolic control system
- Chemokine receptor, a term in cell biology
- Continuity of Care Record, a health record standard
- Creatinine clearance rate, a measure of kidney/renal function
- Crotonyl-CoA carboxylase/reductase, an enzyme
- Complex chromosomal rearrangement, a rare chromosome abnormality

=== Electronics and computing ===
- Center for Communications Research, two research centers (one in Princeton and the other in La Jolla) administered by the Institute for Defense Analyses
- Cluster continuous replication, a form of data replication introduced in Microsoft Exchange 2007
- Concurrency and Coordination Runtime, from the Microsoft Robotics Developer Studio
- Condition Code Register, or status register, in computer processor architecture
- Constant current regulator, an electronic circuit
- Customer Configuration Repository, a service of Oracle Corporation's support for Oracle Database, subsequently known as Oracle Configuration Manager (OCM)

=== Other uses in science and technology ===
- Canonical commutation relation, a concept in physics
- Carbon capture readiness, a European Union energy generation requirement
- Cargo control room of a tank-ship where the person in charge monitors and controls many aspects of liquid cargo movement
- Change Control Request
- Coal combustion residuals, a term for coal combustion products
- Conradson Carbon Residue, in crude-oil refining, a measurement similar to Ramsbottom carbon residue and micro carbon residue
- Koenigsegg CCR, an automobile
- Johnson–Corey–Chaykovsky reaction

== Sport ==
- CEAT Cricket Ratings
- Central City Rollergirls, an English roller derby league
- Closed circuit rebreather (CCR), a type of self-contained underwater breathing apparatus used in scuba diving
- Convict City Roller Derby League, based in Tasmania

== Transportation ==
- Canada Central Railway
- CCR S.A., a Brazilian toll road operator
- Central Canada Railway, a predecessor to Northern Alberta Railways
- Concord/Buchanan Field Airport (IATA airport code CCR)
- Corinth and Counce Railroad

== Other uses ==
- Calculated course rating, a component of the Golf Australia Handicap System
- Calendar of the Close Roll, book series translating and summarizing these medieval documents
- Cardiff Capital Region, city region in Wales
- Catholic Charismatic Renewal, a movement within the Catholic Church
- Central Contractor Registration, a U.S. Government supplier database, replaced in 2012 by the System for Award Management (SAM)
- Chandigarh Capital Region, urban area in and around Chandigarh, India
- Circus Circus Reno, a hotel and casino located in Reno, Nevada
- Collective cabinet responsibility, a constitutional convention in Parliamentary systems of Government
- Combat Command Reserve, a level of military organization employed by the U.S. Army from 1942 to 1963
- Consumer confidence report, an annual water quality report in the United States
- Corporate credit rating, in investment, a bond credit rating assessing the credit worthiness of a corporation's debt issues
- Curly-coated Retriever, a breed of dog

== See also ==
- 2CR (disambiguation)
- CRR (disambiguation)
