= CR2 =

CR2 may refer to:

- CR2 battery, a dry-cell type battery commonly used in cameras
- CR2, a raw image format used by Canon digital cameras
- CR2, a postcode district in the CR postcode area
- CR2, a collaboration of the two DJS Mike van der Viven & Ramon Zenker, known for their house single I Believe
- CR2, a radio station in Hong Kong broadcast by CRHK
- Crossroads Mall (Mumbai), a mall in India
- Challenger 2, a British Main Battle Tank
- Celebrity Rehab 2, a reality television show
- CR2 (company), an Irish-based fintech company
- Camp Rock 2: The Final Jam, the sequel to the Disney Channel Original Movie Camp Rock
- Chromium (II) ions
- Bombardier CRJ100/200, the IATA code for the regional airliner.
- Aviation Park MRT station, Singapore, station code CR2

== Biological/Medical terms ==
- Complement receptor 2, an immunological cell surface receptor for a complement component
- Conserved Region 2, the second conserved region in some proteins; see Braf

== See also ==
- 2CR (disambiguation)
- CRR (disambiguation)
- CR (disambiguation)
- CRCR (disambiguation)
