= 2CR =

2CR may refer to:

- Second Epistle to the Corinthians (a.k.a., Second Corinthians / 2 Corinthians), abbreviated as 2Cr
- ABC Central West, ABC Local Radio station in Orange, New South Wales, callsign 2CR
- 2CR China Radio Network, the Chinese-language narrowcaster
- Heart Dorset & New Forest, the ILR station in Bournemouth, England, once known as 2CR FM

== See also ==
- CCR (disambiguation)
- CR2 (disambiguation)
- CR (disambiguation)
- CRCR (disambiguation)
