= CR =

CR or Cr may refer to:

== Arts and media ==
=== Publications ===
- Casino Royale (novel), a James Bond novel
- Comptes Rendus (disambiguation), several publications of the Comptes Rendus (proceedings) of academic organizations
  - Comptes rendus de l'Académie des Sciences, the proceedings of the French Académie des Sciences, often simply Comptes Rendus or CR
- Consumer Reports, various publications and media by organization of the same name
- Critical Review (disambiguation), several publications by this name
- CR (magazine), published by the American Association for Cancer Research

=== Other media ===
- Challenge rating, a rating of challenges in Dungeons & Dragons
- Clash Royale, a popular mobile strategy game developed and published by Supercell
- Critical Role, a Dungeons & Dragons show
- Crunchyroll, an internet streaming service showing anime

== In business ==
- Conversion rate, in marketing
- Credit Record, in accounting
- Crown Royal, a brand of Canadian whisky

== Organizations ==
=== Media organizations ===
- Critical Role Productions, a media production company
- Crunchyroll, LLC, an anime licensing and entertainment company
- Czech Radio, a public radio broadcaster in the Czech Republic

=== Religious organizations ===
- Celtic Reconstructionism, a form of Polytheism
- Congregation of Clerics Regular of the Divine Providence (Theatines), a Roman Catholic religious order
- Community of the Resurrection, an Anglican religious order
- Congregation of the Resurrection, a Catholic religious order

=== Other organizations ===
- Choose Responsibility, a US non-profit addressing alcohol consumption by young adults
- Consumer Reports, an American nonprofit consumer organization dedicated to independent product testing, investigative journalism, consumer-oriented research, public education, and consumer advocacy; publishes a magazine of the same name
- College of the Redwoods, a public two-year community college in Humboldt County, California, US
- College Republicans, a college branch of the US political party

== People ==
- C. Rajagopalachari, Indian politician
- Christina Ricci, American actress
- Chris Rock, American comedian and actor
- Cristiano Ronaldo, Portuguese footballer
- Christopher Reeve, American actor
- A Royal cypher representing a monarch
  - Charles Rex (CR / CIIIR), the royal cypher of King Charles III

== Places ==
=== Countries ===
- Coral Sea Islands (FIPS country code and obsolete NATO country code CR)
- Costa Rica (ISO 3166-1 country code)
- Czech Republic

=== Other places ===
- CR postcode area in south London, UK
- Castle Rock (disambiguation)
- Campbell River (disambiguation), various rivers
- Cedar Rapids, Iowa, US
- Crawford County, Kansas, US
- Province of Cremona, Italy
- Disney's Contemporary Resort, at Walt Disney World

== Mathematics, science, and technology ==
=== Biology and medicine ===
- CR gas, dibenzoxazepine
- Calorie restriction
- Chemokine receptor
- Complete remission, in oncology
- Computed radiography
- Controlled/continuous release; see time release technology
- Creatine, a molecule found in myocytes
- Critically endangered species

=== Computing and telecommunications ===
- Candidate recommendation, in W3C recommendations
- Card reader
- Carriage return, a new line of text in typing and computing
- Challenge-response spam filtering
- Code review, a systematic examination of computer source code during development
- Cognitive radio, an outgrowth of software-defined radio
- Cognitive robotics
- Control register
- .cr, the top-level domain (ccTLD) for Costa Rica

=== Mathematics ===
- Cauchy–Riemann equations, partial differential equations describing complex differentiability
  - CR manifold, a type of differentiable manifold
- Conjugate residual method, an iterative numeric method used for solving systems of linear equations

=== Other uses in mathematics, science, and technology ===
- Camera Raw, an image file raw converter by Adobe
- Chromium, symbol Cr, a chemical element
- Cr or CR, an improper designation given to astronomical objects in the Collinder catalog of open clusters from Collinder 1–471
- Change request, a document containing a call for an adjustment of a system
- Compression ratio, the ratio of the volume of a combustion chamber from its largest capacity to its smallest capacity
- Concentration ratio, in economics
- Complex resistivity (measurement method), in geophysics
- Cosmic rays

== Sports ==
- Canberra Raiders, Australian rugby league football club
- Chitwan Rhinos, a professional Twenty20 cricket franchise representing Chitwan District, Nepal in the Nepal Premier League (NPL)
- Colorado Rockies, a Major League Baseball team
- Cincinnati Reds, another Major League Baseball team
- Colorado Rockies (NHL), a former National Hockey League team
- Cristiano Ronaldo, Portuguese footballer
- Commonwealth record in athletics
- Commonwealth record in swimming

== Transport ==
=== Railways ===
- Caledonian Railway (Scotland)
- Commonwealth Railways (Australia)
- Central Railway (India)
- Chiltern Railways (England)
- China Railway, or China Railway Corporation, a national corporation in the People's Republic of China
- Consolidated Rail Corporation (Conrail), US
- Copper Range Railroad

=== Roads ===
- County highway, county road, or county route
- Legislative route (Minnesota) or constitutional route

== Other uses ==
- Chart Rulership or Chart Ruler, in astrology
- Comfort room, another name for a public toilet
- Consciousness raising, in social activism
- Continuing resolution, a type of appropriations legislation in the US
- Councillor, a title for a public servant, used in Australia and New Zealand
- Cree language (ISO 639 alpha-2 code CR)
- Critical reading, a skill measured by the Scholastic Aptitude Test (SAT)
- Crore, a number representing 10,000,000 in the Hindu-Arabic numeral system
- Cr$ or ₢, symbol for Brazilian cruzeiro

== See also ==
- CRCR (disambiguation)
- Comptes Rendus (disambiguation)
