= Rajkumar Sharma =

Rajkumar Sharma is the name of:

- Rajkumar Sharma (cricketer)
- Rajkumar Sharma (politician)
- Rajkumar Sharma (director), Indian director; see Mai (1989 film)

== See also ==
- Ram Kumar Sharma
