= Cricket rankings =

Cricket rankings may refer to:

== Team rankings ==
- ICC Men's ODI Team Rankings
- ICC Men's T20I Team Rankings
- ICC Men's Test Team Rankings
- ICC Women's ODI and T20I Team Rankings
- CEAT Cricket Ratings

== Player rankings ==
- ICC Men's Player Rankings
- ICC Women's Player Rankings
- Wisden 100
- Wisden Cricketers of the Century
