= CR2 (company) =

Irish software Company

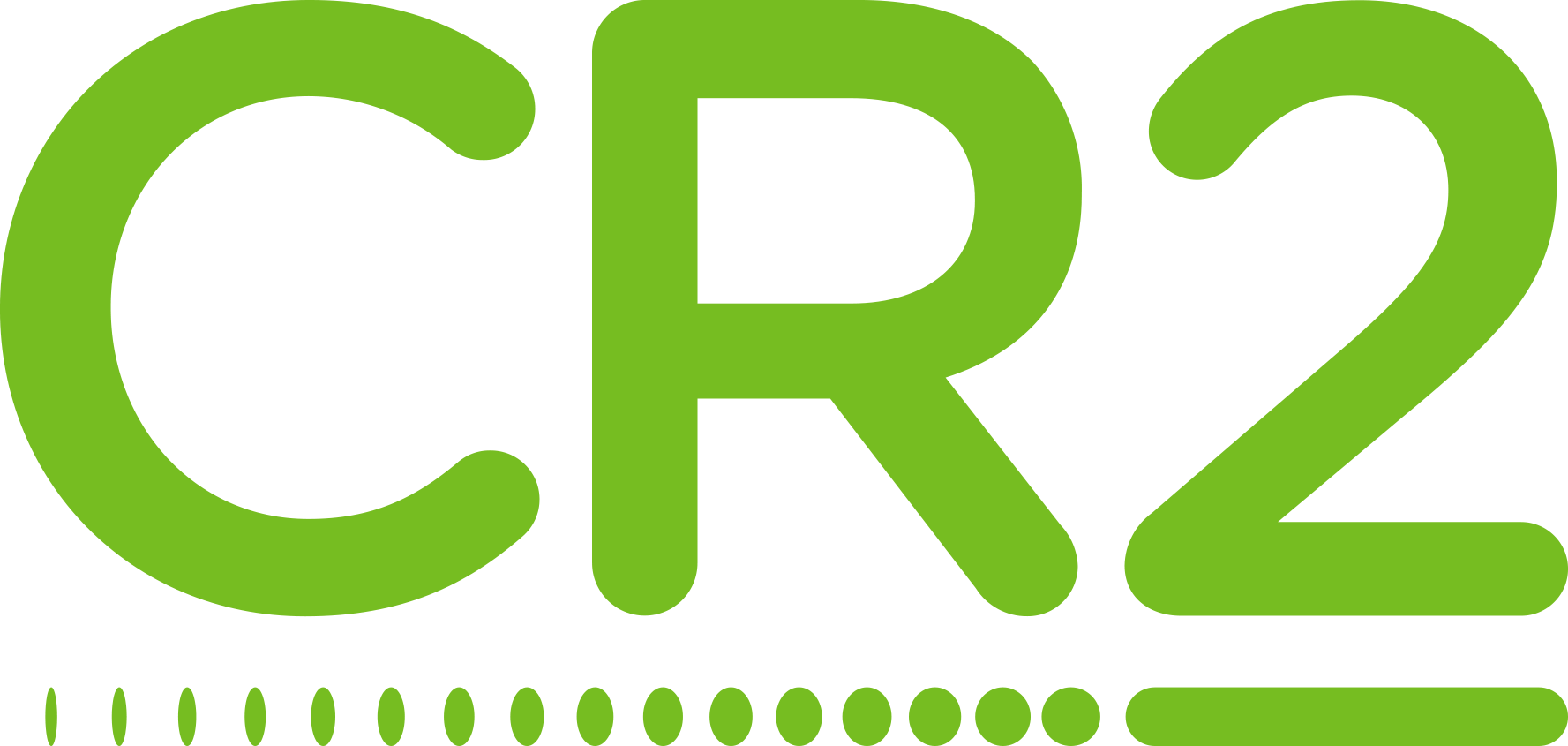
- Company type: Private
- Industry: Computer software
- Founded: 1997
- Headquarters: Dublin, Ireland
- Area served: Worldwide
- Products: BankWorld
- Number of employees: 190
- Parent: HPS
- Website: cr2.com

CR2 is an Irish banking software company which provides mobile, internet and ATM financial service technology to more than 100 retail banks across Africa, the Middle East and Asia. It has offices in Dubai, London, Cairo, Amman, Bengaluru, Lagos, Johannesburg, Singapore and Perth.

== History ==
Founded in 1997 by two former Kindle Banking Systems directors, and part of the fintech portfolio of Ireland's state economic development agency Enterprise Ireland, CR2 is an Irish software company that provides banking products and services to financial institutions in emerging markets.

By 2000, after a series of venture capital cash injections and investment from directors, and the acquisition of London-based Interlink for £10m and was valued at more than $27m.

With investors backing CR2 to the value of €34.5 million since its foundation in 1997, the company emerged from the Dot-com bubble crash of late 2000/early 2001, to report an increase in revenue by posting a turnover of €16.4m in 2002.

An additional R&D funding round to the value of €10m was completed in 2005.

By 2012, the company was placed on the market with a value of more than €60m.

In May 2024, the Moroccan company HPS announced the acquisition of CR2 for an undisclosed sum. On 27 August 2024, HPS announced that it has completed the acquisition of CR2.
