= Virat Kohli =

Indian cricketer (born 1988)

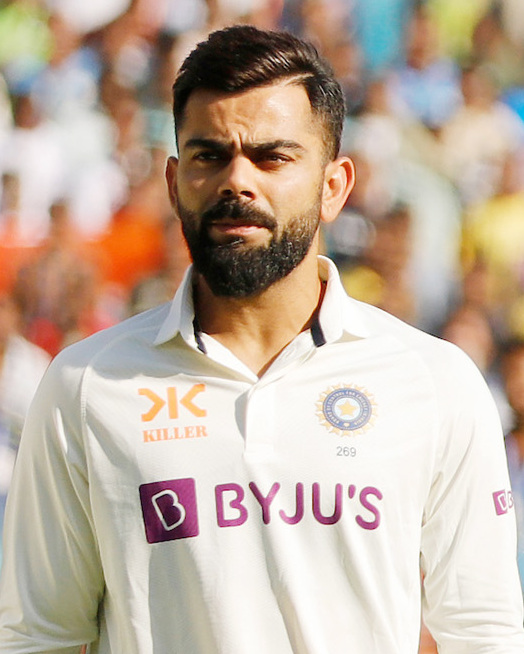
- Kohli in 2023

Personal information
- Born: 5 November 1988 (age 38); New Delhi, India
- Nickname: Cheeku (Note: During a certain phase in his career, Kohli acquired the moniker Cheeku. One evening, Kohli availed himself of the services of a nearby salon and underwent a makeover. Upon displaying his new appearance to his colleagues, Kohli's assistant coach, Ajit Chowdhary, made a humorous comparison between Kohli's appearance and that of "Chikoo," a character from the popular Indian comic book, Champak.)
- Height: 5 ft 9 in (175 cm)
- Batting: Right-handed
- Bowling: Right-arm medium
- Role: Top-order batter
- Relatives: Anushka Sharma (m. 2017)

International information
- National side: India (2008–present)
- Test debut (cap 269): 20 June 2011 v West Indies
- Last Test: 3 January 2025 v Australia
- ODI debut (cap 175): 18 August 2008 v Sri Lanka
- Last ODI: 27 September 2026 v West Indies
- ODI shirt no.: 18
- T20I debut (cap 31): 12 June 2010 v Zimbabwe
- Last T20I: 29 June 2024 v South Africa
- T20I shirt no.: 18

Domestic team information
- Years: Team
- 2006–present: Delhi
- 2008–present: Royal Challengers Bengaluru

Career statistics
Competition	Test	ODI	T20I	FC
Matches	123	318	125	156
Runs scored	9,230	15,183	4,188	11,485
Batting average	46.85	59.07	48.69	48.05
100s/50s	30/31	55/80	1/38	37/39
Top score	254*	183	122*	254*
Balls bowled	175	662	152	643
Wickets	0	5	4	3
Bowling average	–	136.00	51.00	112.66
5 wickets in innings	–	0	0	0
10 wickets in match	–	0	0	0
Best bowling	–	1/13	1/13	1/19
Catches/stumpings	121/–	172/–	54/–	152/–
Medal record
Men's cricket
Representing India
ICC World Test Championship
Runner-up	2019–2021
Runner-up	2021–2023
ICC Cricket World Cup
Winner	2011 India, Sri Lanka, Bangladesh
Runner-up	2023 India
ICC Champions Trophy
Winner	2013 England & Wales
Winner	2025 Pakistan
Runner-up	2017 England & Wales
ICC T20 World Cup
Winner	2024 West Indies & USA
Runner-up	2014 Bangladesh
ACC Asia Cup
Winner	2010 Sri Lanka
Winner	2016 Bangladesh
Winner	2023 Pakistan
ICC U19 World Cup
Winner	2008 Malaysia
- Source: Cricricinfo, 4 November 2026

Virat Kohli (born 5 November 1988) is an Indian international cricketer and former all-format captain of the Indian national team. He is a right-handed batter and an occasional right-arm medium-pace bowler. Considered one of the greatest batters in cricket, he has been acclaimed for his batting skills and records. Kohli has the most centuries in ODIs and the second-most centuries in international cricket with 86 tons across all formats. He is also the leading run-scorer in the Indian Premier League.

Kohli was the captain of the 2008 U19 World Cup winning team and was a crucial member of the Indian teams that won 2011 Cricket World Cup, 2013 Champions Trophy, 2024 T20 World Cup, and 2025 Champions Trophy. He plays for Royal Challengers Bengaluru in the Indian Premier League and for Delhi in domestic cricket. In 2013, Kohli was ranked number one in the ODI batting rankings. In 2015, he achieved the same in T20I cricket. In 2018, he was ranked number one in Test cricket, making him the only Indian to hold the top spot in all three formats. He is the first player to score 20,000 international runs in a decade. He was the Cricketer of the Decade for 2011 to 2020.

Kohli has won ten ICC Awards, making him the most awarded player in international cricket history. He won the ODI Player of the Year award four times, in 2012, 2017, 2018, and 2023. He won the Cricketer of the Year award on two occasions, in 2017 and 2018. In 2018, he became the first player to win all three major ICC awards including Cricketer of the Year, ODI Player of the Year and Test Player of the Year in the same year. He was honored with the Spirit of Cricket Award in 2019 and given the Cricketer of the Decade and ODI Cricketer of the Decade in 2020. Kohli was named the Wisden Leading Cricketer in the World for three consecutive years.

Kohli has won the most Player of the Series and second-most Player of the Match awards to his name in all three formats combined. He was honoured with the Arjuna Award in 2013, the Padma Shri in 2017, and India's highest sporting honour, the Khel Ratna Award, in 2018. Time included him on its 100 most influential people in the world list in 2018. Kohli has been deemed one of the most commercially valuable athletes, with estimated earnings of ₹634 crore (equivalent to ₹692 crore or US$74 million in 2026) in 2022.

After winning the 2024 T20 World Cup being named Player of the Match award in the final, Kohli announced his retirement from T20Is. On 12 May 2025, at the age of 36, he announced his retirement from the Test cricket. He is married to actress Anushka Sharma, and they have two children.

== Early life ==
Kohli was born on 5 November 1988 in New Delhi into a Punjabi Hindu family. His mother Saroj Kohli is a homemaker while his father Prem Nath Kohli worked as a criminal lawyer. He has an elder brother Vikas and an elder sister Bhawna. His formative years were spent in Uttam Nagar. His early education was at Vishal Bharti Public School. As per his family, Kohli exhibited an early affinity for cricket as a 3-year-old. He would pick up a bat and request his father to bowl to him. In 1998, the West Delhi Cricket Academy was created. In May, his father arranged for him to meet Rajkumar Sharma. Upon the suggestion of their neighbours, Kohli's father considered enrolling his son in a professional cricket academy, as they believed his ability merited more than gully cricket.

Kohli was unable to secure a place in the U-14 Delhi team, due to extraneous factors. His father reportedly received offers to relocate his son to influential clubs, which would ensure his selection, but he declined the proposals. Kohli eventually found his way into the U-15 team. He received training at the academy and participated in matches at the Sumeet Dogra Academy located at Vasundhara Enclave. To further his cricket career, he transferred to Saviour Convent School during his ninth grade. On 18 December 2006, his father died due to a cerebral attack. As per his mother, Kohli's demeanour shifted noticeably after his father's death. He took on cricket with newfound seriousness, prioritizing playing time and dedicating himself fully to the sport. Kohli's family resided in Meera Bagh, Paschim Vihar until 2015, after which they relocated to Gurgaon.

== Youth career ==
=== Delhi team ===
Kohli's junior cricket career kicked off in October 2002 at the Luhnu Cricket Ground against Himachal Pradesh. His first half-century in domestic cricket happened at Feroze Shah Kotla, where he scored 70 runs against Haryana. By the end of the season, he had amassed a total of 172 runs, emerging as the highest run-scorer for his team with an average of 34.40. During the 2003–04 season of Polly Umrigar Trophy, Kohli was appointed the captain of the U-15 team. He scored 54 runs in Delhi's victory over Himachal Pradesh. In the next fixture against Jammu and Kashmir, Kohli scored his maiden century with a score of 119. By the end of the season, he had a total of 390 runs at an average of 78, which included two centuries. Towards the end of 2004, Kohli earned selection for the 2004–05 Vijay Merchant Trophy with the Delhi U-17 team. In the four matches that he played, Kohli had a total of 470 runs, with his highest score being 251* runs. The team's coach, Ajit Chaudhary, lauded his performance and was particularly impressed with his temperament on the field. He commenced the 2005–06 season with a score of 227 against Punjab. Following their victory over Uttar Pradesh in the quarter-finals, Delhi was scheduled to play against Baroda in the semi-finals. The team had high expectations from Kohli, who had promised his coach to finish the job. True to his word, Kohli went on to score 228 runs, leading Delhi to victory. The team later secured the tournament with a five-wicket win over Mumbai, where he contributed with a half-century in the first innings. He ended as the highest run-scorer with a total of 757 runs from 7 matches, averaging 84.11.

On 18 February 2006, Kohli made his debut in List A cricket, playing against Services in the Ranji One-Day Trophy, but he did not get the opportunity to bat during the match. In 2006, Kohli got a spot in the state senior team. Subsequently, he made his first-class debut on 23 November 2006, during the opening match of the Ranji Trophy season against Tamil Nadu. However, his debut innings was a brief one, as he was dismissed after scoring ten runs. In the subsequent match against former champions, Karnataka, Delhi found themselves trailing with a score of 130/5, with Kohli remaining unbeaten on 40 at the end of the day's play. That night, Kohli's father died. Despite the heart-wrenching news, Kohli returned to the match and continued to bat and scored 90 runs before he was dismissed. Chetan Chauhan, the coach, was impressed by his determination and unwavering attitude in the face of adversity. Venkatesh Prasad lauded his crucial knock, which was executed in the midst of an emotional upheaval. After his dismissal, Kohli attended his father's funeral. His innings proved to be crucial for Delhi as they were able to avoid the follow-on. The team's captain, Mithun Manhas, praised Kohli for his performance, acknowledging its pivotal role in the team's success.

Kohli's foray into T20 cricket first happened in April 2007, during the Inter-State T20 Championship, where he emerged as the top run-getter for his team with a tally of 179 runs at an average of 35.80. In Sep 2008, Kohli played in Nissar Trophy against SNGPL. He emerged as the leading scorer for Delhi in both innings, registering 52 runs in the first innings and a towering 197 in the second. The match ultimately ended in a draw, SNGPL being declared the victors due to their lead in first innings. In the 2009–10 Ranji Trophy season, Kohli returned to domestic cricket. During a match against Maharashtra, he opened the batting and scored 67 runs, helping Delhi to secure the bonus point required for victory. Kohli's performance reinvigorated the competitive spirit of the domestic cricket circuit.

=== India U19 team ===
In July 2006, Kohli was selected in the India Under-19 squad on its tour of England. He averaged 105 in the three-match ODI series against England Under-19s, while also averaging 49 in the 3-match Test series. Following India U-19 success in both the ODI and Test series, the team's coach Lalchand Rajput noted Kohli's adeptness in facing both pace and spin bowling and expressed his admiration for his technical prowess. In September, the U-19 team toured Pakistan. In the first Test match, Kohli scored 63 and 28 as India won by 271 runs against Pakistan Under-19s. In the 2nd match, he contributed 83 runs to India's victory by 240 runs and an innings. He concluded the tour with 80 runs in the final ODI game at Lahore. In early 2007, Kohli was a part of the India U-19 team that toured New Zealand, where he scored 113 in the first Test match. The series ended in a draw. In the following month, the team travelled to Malaysia for a tri-series against England Under-19s and Sri Lanka Under-19s, where Kohli did not get many opportunities to bat. In July–August, India U-19 embarked on a tour for a tri-series against Sri Lanka Under-19s and Bangladesh Under-19s, where he did not score a half-century in any of the matches. He made a comeback with scores of 144 and an unbeaten 94 in the following Test series.

Kohli came into the limelight in 2008 when he led the team to victory in the U-19 World Cup. He led the Indian squad and won the 2008 U-19 World Cup held in Malaysia. He amassed 235 runs at an average of 47, ranking as the tournament's third-highest scorer and one of three cricketers to compile a century. His century, a knock of 100 runs off 74 balls, versus the West Indies Under-19s in a group stage encounter, was lauded by ESPNcricinfo, as "the innings of the tournament." This innings paved the way for India's 50-run triumph and fetched Kohli the man of the match award. Additionally, Kohli's all-round performance in the semi-final against New Zealand Under-19s, where he captured 2 wickets and contributed 43 runs in the run-chase, was core to India's victory. In the championship match, Kohli managed a score of 19 against South Africa Under-19s and his contribution lead to the eventual 12-run win (via D/L method).

In June 2008, Kohli and his U-19 teammates Pradeep Sangwan and Tanmay Srivastava were awarded the Border–Gavaskar scholarship. This scholarship, aimed at honing the skills of the chosen cricketers, provided an opportunity to train for six weeks at Cricket Australia's Centre of Excellence in Brisbane. In a bid to identify potential talent for the senior team, Kohli was selected to represent India Emerging Players in the Emerging Players Tournament 2008. His finest performance in the tournament was against New Zealand Emerging Players, where he played a knock of 120 runs, leading India to a seven-wicket victory. With an aggregate of 204 runs, Kohli's performances did not go unnoticed by the selectors who were observing his progress. He began his international cricket journey by joining the senior team in Colombo, having played 28 Under-19 ODIs and 12 Under-19 Tests.

== International career ==
Kohli's international career began in August 2008 when the 19-year-old had a "surprise call-up" to the ODI squad for a tour of Sri Lanka. He opened the batting due to injuries to senior players, scoring his first half-century in the fourth match. After a brief stint with the India A team, he scored a century against a strong Australian bowling line-up in a tour match. Despite an early BCCI contract, Kohli's place in the team was not secure. A turning point came in the 2009 Emerging Players Tournament in Australia, where he was the top run-scorer, leading his team to victory with a century in the final. This performance cemented his return to the national team. He scored his maiden ODI century in December 2009 against Sri Lanka. By early 2010, he became the third Indian to score two ODI centuries before turning 22.

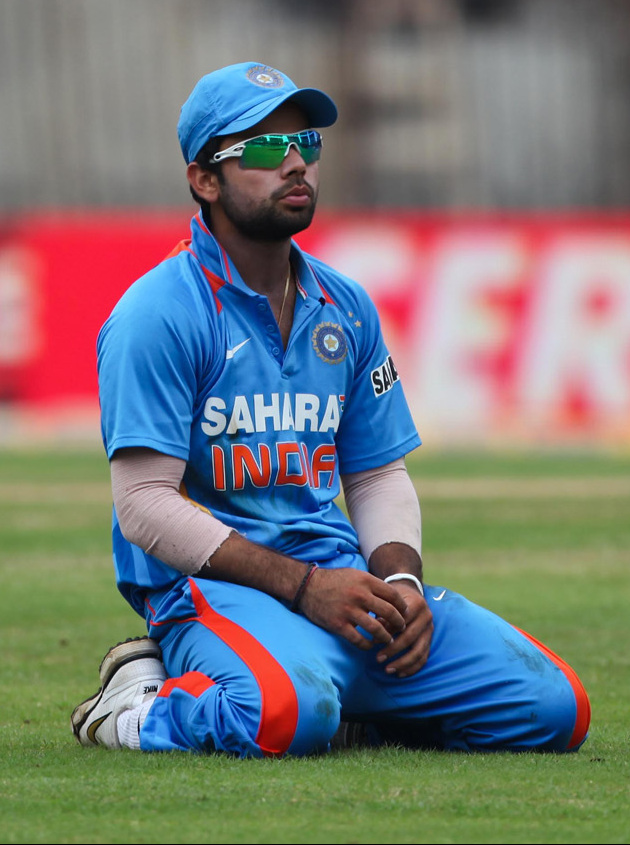
Kohli fielding during a match in December 2010

In 2010, Kohli was appointed vice-captain for a tri-series in Zimbabwe and became the then fastest Indian to score 1,000 ODI runs. After a dip in form during the 2010 Asia Cup, he solidified his position with consistent performances, finishing as India's leading ODI run-scorer for the year. Kohli played a crucial role in India's 2011 World Cup victory, scoring a century on his debut and a 35 in the final. Further made his Test debut in June 2011 against the West Indies, but struggled initially and was dropped. He was recalled and eventually found his footing, scoring his maiden Test century in Adelaide in January 2012. On 28 February 2012, during the Commonwealth Bank tri-series in Hobart, Kohli scored an unbeaten 133 runs from 86 balls against Sri Lanka, helping India chase 321 in 36.4 overs to secure a bonus-point victory and remain in contention for the tournament final. and a career-best 183 against Pakistan in the 2012 Asia Cup, being the standout performances.

By 2013, Kohli was a linchpin of the Indian batting line-up, particularly in run-chases. He played a key role in India's 2013 Champions Trophy win and was appointed captain for the first time during a tri-series in the West Indies, where he scored his first century as skipper. He later established several records, including the fastest ODI century by an Indian. After a difficult tour of England in 2014 where he averaged 13.4, Kohli regained form and was named the full-time Test captain following MS Dhoni's retirement during the tour of Australia. In his first series as permanent captain, he scored three centuries in his first three innings, totaling 692 runs, the most by an Indian batsman in a Test series in Australia. He also remained consistent in the T20 format, earning the Man of the Tournament award at the 2014 ICC World Twenty20 for his 319 runs in the tournament.

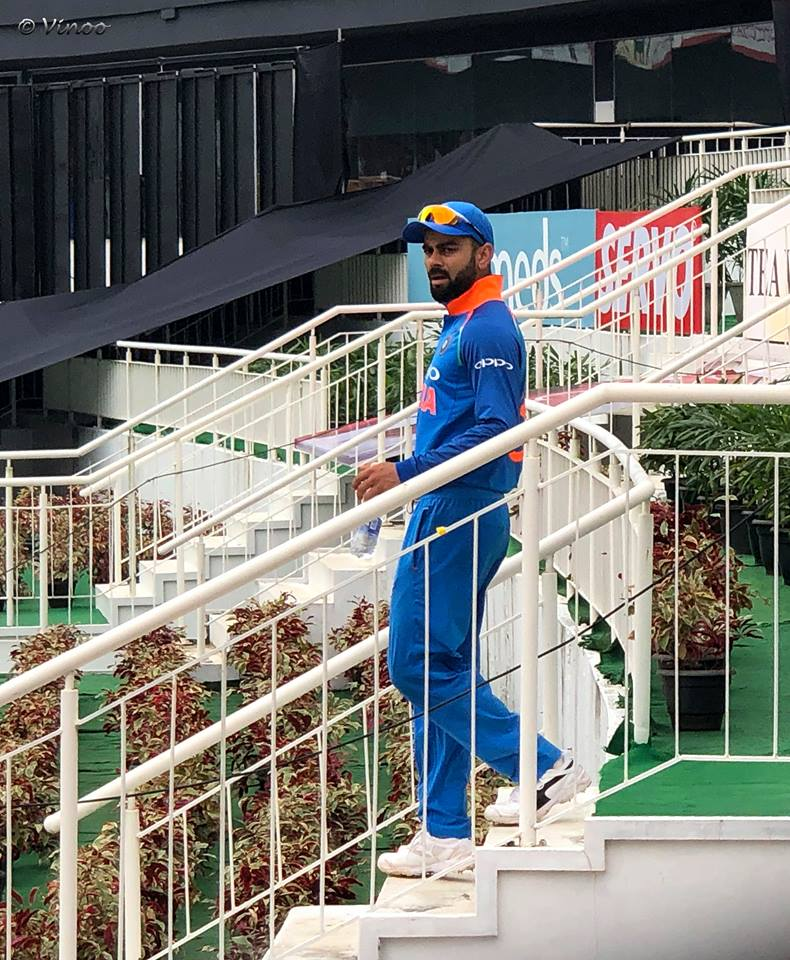
Kohli at Greenfield Stadium during match with West Indies

Kohli's form in the lead-up to the World Cup was not at his best, however after a strong start to the 2015 World Cup with a century against Pakistan, Kohli's tournament ended with a score of 1 in the semi-final loss to Australia. A subsequent dip in form was followed by his first Test series win as captain in Sri Lanka. From 2016 to 2018, he entered a peak phase of his career. In 2016, he was the Player of the Tournament at the ICC World T20. He became the first batsman to score double centuries in four consecutive Test series and was appointed captain for the 2017 Champions Trophy, where India finished as runners-up. This period saw him break numerous records, including becoming the fastest to 8,000, 10,000, and 11,000 ODI runs. In 2018, he became the No. 1 ranked Test batsman and led India to first-ever Test series victory in Australia. By 2019, he became India's most successful Test captain, holding the ICC Test Mace for three consecutive years. He scored his 70th international century in November 2019, but this was followed by a prolonged lean patch. From 2020 to 2022, Kohli struggled for runs and stepped down from the T20I, ODI, and Test captaincy in succession.

Kohli's return to form began at the 2022 Asia Cup, where he scored his maiden T20I century, his first in any format in over 1,000 days. He was the highest run-scorer at the 2022 T20 World Cup, playing an impactful innings of 82* against Pakistan. His peak resurgence came at the 2023 World Cup on home soil where he was named the Player of the Tournament for scoring a record 765 runs in a single edition. During the tournament, he scored his 50th ODI hundred, surpassing Tendulkar's long-standing record. In next year's T20 World Cup; Kohli had a lean tournament, however delivered a player of the match performance in the final, scoring 76 as India won the trophy. Following the victory, he announced his retirement from T20 Internationals. In the 2025 Champions Trophy, Kohli was instrumental in India's victory, scoring a century and becoming the fastest to 14,000 ODI runs. India later secured the title. On 12 May 2025, after poor Border-Gavaskar Trophy performances he announced that the Test-series would be his last, marking his retirement from Test cricket.

Virat Kohli scored his 54th ODI century against New Zealand in the third ODI at Indore, reaching the milestone in 91 balls with eight fours and two sixes while chasing a target of 337. With this innings, he became the leading century-maker against New Zealand with seven hundreds, surpassing Ricky Ponting and Virender Sehwag (six each), and Sachin Tendulkar and Sanath Jayasuriya (five each). Kohli also became the highest run-scorer batting at number three. The century was his 85th in international cricket and his 41st on home soil. Virat Kohli became the first batter in ODI history to score 13,000 runs while batting at number three during the first ODI against New Zealand at Eden Park, Auckland. He also became the leading run-scorer in ODI chases.

== Franchise career ==
Royal Challengers Bengaluru

T20 Cricket

Indian Premier League
Winner	2025, 2026	
Runner-up	2009, 2011, 2016	

Champions League
Runner-up	2011	

In the inaugural 2008 Indian Premier League season, Royal Challengers Bangalore, then owned by Vijay Mallya, acquired Kohli for $50,000 following his performances in the Under-19 World Cup. Kohli managed one run in the opening match against Kolkata Knight Riders and initially struggled in the middle order. A brief promotion to the top order in a match against the Deccan Chargers offered a glimpse of form, but he soon returned to his original position. He concluded the season with 165 runs, as Bangalore finished seventh in the league standings. In the 2009 season, Kohli began with a series of low scores but found form with a half-century in the third match. Despite limited opportunities, he made crucial contributions, notably in the semi-final victory over Chennai Super Kings. However, he was dismissed for 7 in the final, as Bangalore lost to Deccan Chargers by eight runs, finishing as runners-up.

The 2010 season saw Kohli elevated to the role of vice-captain. He emerged as a reliable middle-order batter and an athletic fielder, with a notable 58 against the Deccan Chargers. Bangalore reached the playoffs but were eliminated by Mumbai Indians in the semi-final, where Kohli was again dismissed for 7. In the 2010 Champions League T20, he delivered key performances, scoring 47 and 49* to help Bangalore reach the semi-finals before falling to Chennai. Ahead of the 2011 season, Kohli was the sole player retained by Bangalore for $1.8 million. After a steady start, he hit peak form with a string of impactful innings, including a half-century and consecutive Player of the Match awards. He also stepped in as captain during Daniel Vettori's absence and earned praise for his leadership. Bangalore topped the league table and advanced to the final, where Kohli contributed 35 runs in a losing cause. He concluded the season with 557 runs, finishing as the second-highest run-scorer. In the 2012 IPL season, Kohli experienced an inconsistent run, beginning with low scores before registering a few significant innings, including an unbeaten 73 against Delhi Daredevils as part of a then-record 203-run partnership with Gayle. Midway through the season, he assumed captaincy from Vettori but could not guide Bangalore into the playoffs, with the team falling short in their final league match. Kohli ended the campaign with 364 runs and expressed dissatisfaction with his performance, acknowledging the need for improvement. Promoted to full-time captain from the 2013 season, Kohli began with an unbeaten 93 and successive half-centuries, briefly taking his team to the top of the table. However, a mid-season slump, coupled with inconsistent bowling performances, derailed their campaign. Despite Kohli's individual scores, including a 99-run innings, Bangalore failed to qualify for the playoffs. Retained for ₹12.5 crore ahead of the 2014 season, Kohli endured one of his most challenging campaigns. Although he began with an unbeaten 49, his form deteriorated with a series of low scores and multiple ducks. Attempts to revive his form by opening the innings proved ineffective, and he registered only a single half-century in his twelfth match. With Bangalore heavily dependent on Kohli and Gayle, the team lost six of their first nine matches and was eventually eliminated from playoff contention. Kohli ended the season with a 73 against Chennai.

In the 2015 season, Kohli opened the batting for Bangalore alongside Gayle and maintained consistent returns, scoring 505 runs in 16 matches at an average of 45.90. His notable performances included an 82-run innings as part of a then-record 215-run partnership with AB de Villiers against Mumbai, and an unbeaten 44 in a rain-shortened fixture against Hyderabad. Under Kohli's captaincy, Bangalore reached the playoffs but were eliminated in Qualifier 2 by Chennai. The 2016 season marked a significant phase in Kohli's career. He began with a series of half-centuries and registered his maiden T20 century against Gujarat. Despite a slow start to the campaign, Bangalore staged a strong recovery, with Kohli scoring four centuries over the course of the tournament. He finished the season with a record 973 runs at an average of 81.08, claiming both the Orange Cap and the Most Valuable Player award. Bangalore reached the final but lost to Hyderabad by 8 runs.

At the onset of 2017 season, Kohli missed the opening three matches due to a shoulder injury but returned with a 62-run innings against Mumbai. Despite adding a few more half-centuries, Bangalore endured a difficult campaign, including being dismissed for league record of 49 against Kolkata. Kohli cited the team's lack of intent and conservative approach as key concerns. Bangalore were eliminated early, finishing at the bottom of the table, with Kohli scoring 308 runs in 10 innings. That same year, he was named in ESPNcricinfo's all-time IPL XI as part of the league's tenth-anniversary recognitions. Ahead of 2018, Kohli was retained for ₹17 crore, making him the most expensive player at the time. He crossed the 500-run mark for a record fifth time and briefly held the Orange Cap, but Bangalore failed to advance beyond the league stage. Heavy reliance on Kohli and de Villiers, alongside an underperforming bowling unit, contributed to their early exit. The 2019 season began with Kohli moving down the order, a tactical change that did not yield the desired results. He later returned to form with a century and finished the season with a series of improved performances, but Bangalore had lost their first six matches and again failed to reach the playoffs. Kohli acknowledged the late improvement but pointed to ongoing issues in the middle order, leading to increased scrutiny over his long captaincy tenure. Between 2020 and 2022, Kohli experienced mixed outcomes in the IPL. In the 2020 season, after a slow start, he delivered several steady innings that helped Bangalore qualify for the playoffs. However, his conservative strike rate and early dismissal in the eliminator contributed to the team's exit. In 2021, he began positively and reached multiple individual milestones, including becoming the first player to play 200 matches for Bangalore and surpassing 10,000 runs in T20 cricket. Midway through the season, Kohli announced his decision to step down from captaincy at the end of the campaign. Bangalore again reached the playoffs, but Kohli's dip in form coincided with the team's elimination. In 2022, under new captain Faf du Plessis, Kohli faced a prolonged lean patch, recording multiple low scores and three ducks, which is the joint-highest in a single season of his career. His struggles drew criticism from analysts and led to suggestions of taking a break from cricket. He responded with a 73-run innings in a must-win match that secured Bangalore a place in the playoffs, but failed to make a significant impact in the knockout games. The season concluded without a title, extending championship drought.

In the inaugural match of 2023 season, Kohli began with an unbeaten 82 against Mumbai and maintained steady form, registering five half-centuries in the first eight matches. His approach combined early aggression in the powerplay with a more measured tempo through the middle overs. He also briefly captained the team in Faf du Plessis's absence. Despite ending the season with back-to-back centuries, surpassing Gayle's record for most IPL hundreds. Bangalore failed to secure a playoff spot. Kohli concluded the campaign with 639 runs at an average of 53.2 and a strike rate of 140. Further in 2024, Kohli played in rhythm, scoring several fifties and a career-best unbeaten 113 against Rajasthan, though it came in a defeat. Bangalore recovered from a six-match losing streak with a six-match winning streak to enter the playoffs, with Kohli contributing significantly, including a notable 92 off 47. He ended the season with 741 runs at 61.75, earning the Orange Cap for the second time. In the 2025 IPL season, Kohli scored 657 runs in 15 innings at an average of 54.75 and a strike rate of 146.5, finishing as the tournament's third-highest run-scorer. In the final against Punjab Kings, he contributed 43 runs off 35 balls as Bengaluru posted 190/9, eventually winning the match by six runs. The victory marked the franchise's first IPL title, ending an 18-year wait. It was also Kohli's first IPL championship in 18 seasons with the team. In 2026, Kohli contributed in the back-to-back IPL title wins for Bengaluru, being the team's highest run scorer and Player of the Match of the finals.

== Player profile ==
=== Playing style ===
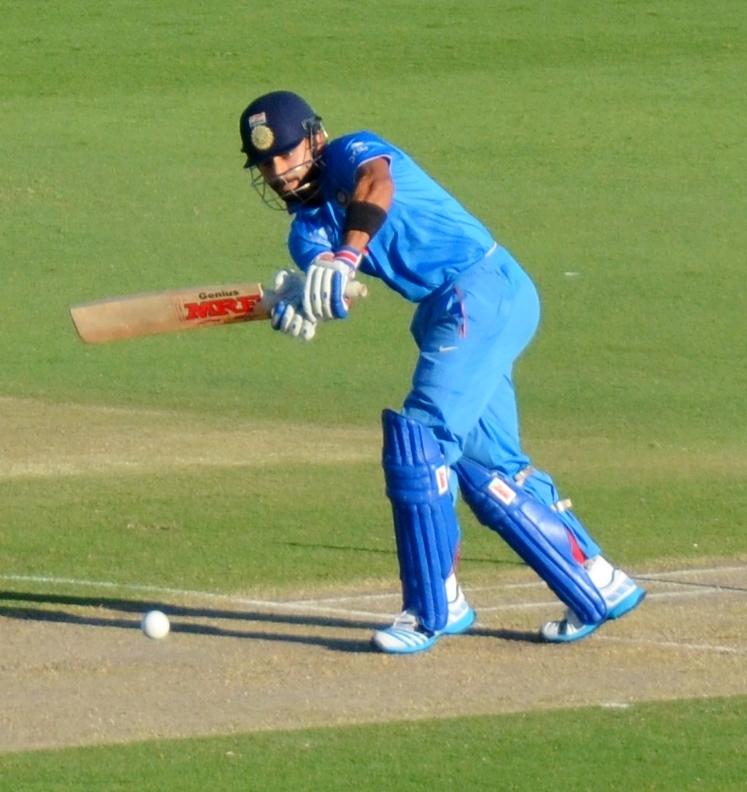
Kohli playing a flick shot at the 2015 Cricket World Cup

Kohli is considered as an enterprising batsman, possessing technical abilities and a dynamic playing demeanour. His customarily batting position in ODl cricket is at number three, with a slightly open-chested stance, and a resolute grip on the bottom handle of his bat. He has been noted for his agile footwork, expansive range of strokes, and his propensity for adeptly orchestrating innings whilst thriving in high-pressure situations. In his batting technique, Kohli tends to favour playing grounded shots rather than attempting big hits. He is appreciated for his ability to execute wrist shots and his consistent prowess in the mid-wicket and cover region. Kohli has often expressed his admiration for the cover drive, which he considers to be his signature stroke. He possesses a natural aptitude for the flick shot, particularly when facing deliveries aimed towards leg stump. Having a limited recourse to the sweep shot, Kohli's batting technique is characterized by an emphasis on ground shots that primarily yield runs in the regions between deep square leg and mid-on. Kohli is known for his composed batting technique and versatility in his play. He scores runs between long-off and long-on with an aligned bat, while also possessing the ability to display a destructive streak. His combination of bat-speed and supple wrist movements enable him to craft innovative angles that disrupt traditional field positioning. Kohli is also a proficient fielder, recognized for his quick reflexes and sure-handedness.

However, Kohli has a known vulnerability to deliveries that are wide of the off-stump. Bowlers often exploit this weakness by targeting him with such deliveries, especially in Test and ODl matches. This vulnerability has resulted in Kohli's dismissal on numerous occasions. Former New Zealand cricketer Richard Hadlee has also noted that Kohli is particularly susceptible to out-swinging deliveries.

Kohli has garnered widespread acclaim and recognition as a preeminent limited-overs batter by cricketing experts and aficionados alike. In ODIs, he boasts an average of 65.5 runs when batting second and 51.7 runs when batting first. He has amassed 28 of his 51 ODI hundreds in run-chases, and holds the record for the most hundreds scored when batting second. In reference to his success while batting second, Kohli has expressed a fondness for the challenge of chasing, relishing the opportunity to test himself and demonstrate his ability to efficiently manage strike rotation and execute boundary hits. His colleagues admire his self-assurance, dedication, concentration, and work ethic, which are the driving forces behind his success.

=== Aggression ===
Kohli's playing style is widely regarded as aggressive, a trait that extends to his leadership on the field. He is known for his passionate and animated responses to on-field situations, demonstrating a fierce competitiveness. His captaincy is characterized as proactive, taking bold decisions and leading the team by example. Kohli has been the subject of much media scrutiny and criticism in the early stages of his career. He was often portrayed as a brash and arrogant individual, eliciting mixed reactions from fans, critics and former cricketers alike. While some have praised his assertiveness and confidence, others have criticized Kohli's behaviour for crossing the boundaries of fair play and for losing control, sometimes resulting in a loss of composure. Despite his efforts to curb his aggressive behaviour, Kohli has acknowledged that there are times when intense pressure or high-stakes situations may challenge his resolve. Nevertheless, the cricketer has persistently maintained that his aggression acts as a source of inspiration and drives his focus and motivation on the field. Writing for The New York Times, Huw Richards noted Kohli's self-assuredness and "assertiveness" in contrast to some former Indian cricketers who he felt had exhibited an inclination towards excessive politeness and reticence, and that Kohli embodies his combative demeanour both on and off the cricket field. In contrast, former India captain Kapil Dev suggested Kohli's aggression was fake, saying Rohit Sharma "doesn't show fake aggression like Kohli."

=== Comparisons to Sachin Tendulkar ===
Kohli's batting style and approach to the game have frequently drawn comparisons to Sachin Tendulkar, who he regarded as the epitome of excellence in cricket. Dubbed as Tendulkar's "successor", he is widely considered to have the potential to surpass his records in the future. His reverence for Tendulkar as a role model, who he idolized in his formative years and sought to emulate, is well-documented. Indian commentator Aakash Chopra has notes that Tendulkar possessed a broader array of shots. However, English batting great Kevin Pietersen has termed Kohli superior due to his impressive records in run-chases.

In a discourse with Bollywood actor Salman Khan, Tendulkar proclaimed that Kohli possesses the potential to surpass his record of 100 international centuries. Tendulkar also acknowledged Kohli's batting aptitudes and the steadfastness with which he has accumulated runs. In 2013, Tendulkar retired from international cricket, Kohli, who played alongside Tendulkar in the team, honoured him by presenting him with a sacred thread that had been gifted to him by his late father. Tendulkar eventually returned the thread to him, imploring that it should remain in his possession.

== Public image and in media ==
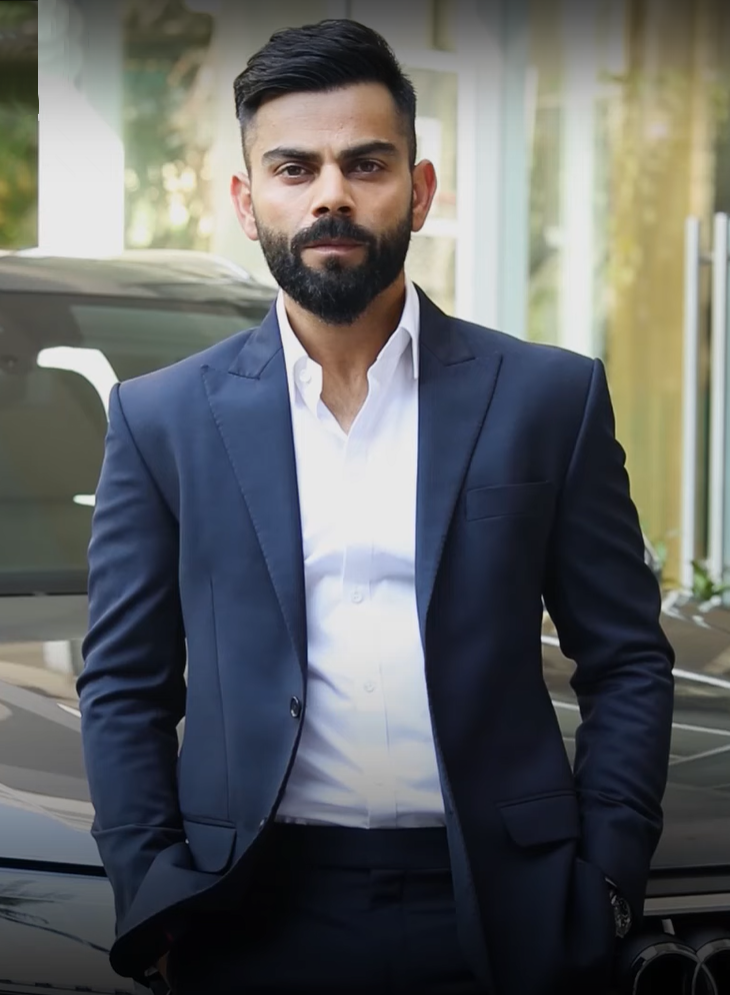
Virat Kohli in an Audi Q7 commercial

In 2008, Kohli was approached by sports agent Bunty Sajdeh of Cornerstone Sport and Entertainment after his notable performance in the ICC Under-19 World Cup. Sajdeh was impressed with Kohli's leadership skills and attitude and saw great potential in the young cricketer. After being recommended by Yuvraj Singh, Kohli was signed to Cornerstone Sport and Entertainment. Over the years, Kohli's brand endorsement portfolio has experienced significant growth. In 2013, it was reported that his endorsements were valued at over ₹100 crore (US$11 million). Now in 2023, his brand value has reached ₹1,000 crore (US$110 million). His bat deal with MRF is regarded as one of the most financially rewarding deals in cricket history. In 2017, Kohli entered into a notable endorsement agreement with Puma that spanned over eight years and was estimated to be worth around ₹1.1 billion (US$12 million). This deal made Kohli the first Indian athlete to sign a brand endorsement contract valued at ₹100 crore (US$11 million) deal with a brand. As of January 2023, Kohli is widely regarded as the most marketable cricketer, with annual earnings estimated at ₹165 crore (US$18 million). Kohli is currently recognized as the most followed Asian individual on the social media platform Instagram, boasting over 274 million followers on the platform. Reports indicate that he is able to command a fee of ₹8.9 crore (equivalent to ₹10 crore or US$1.1 million in 2026) for each sponsored post on the platform.

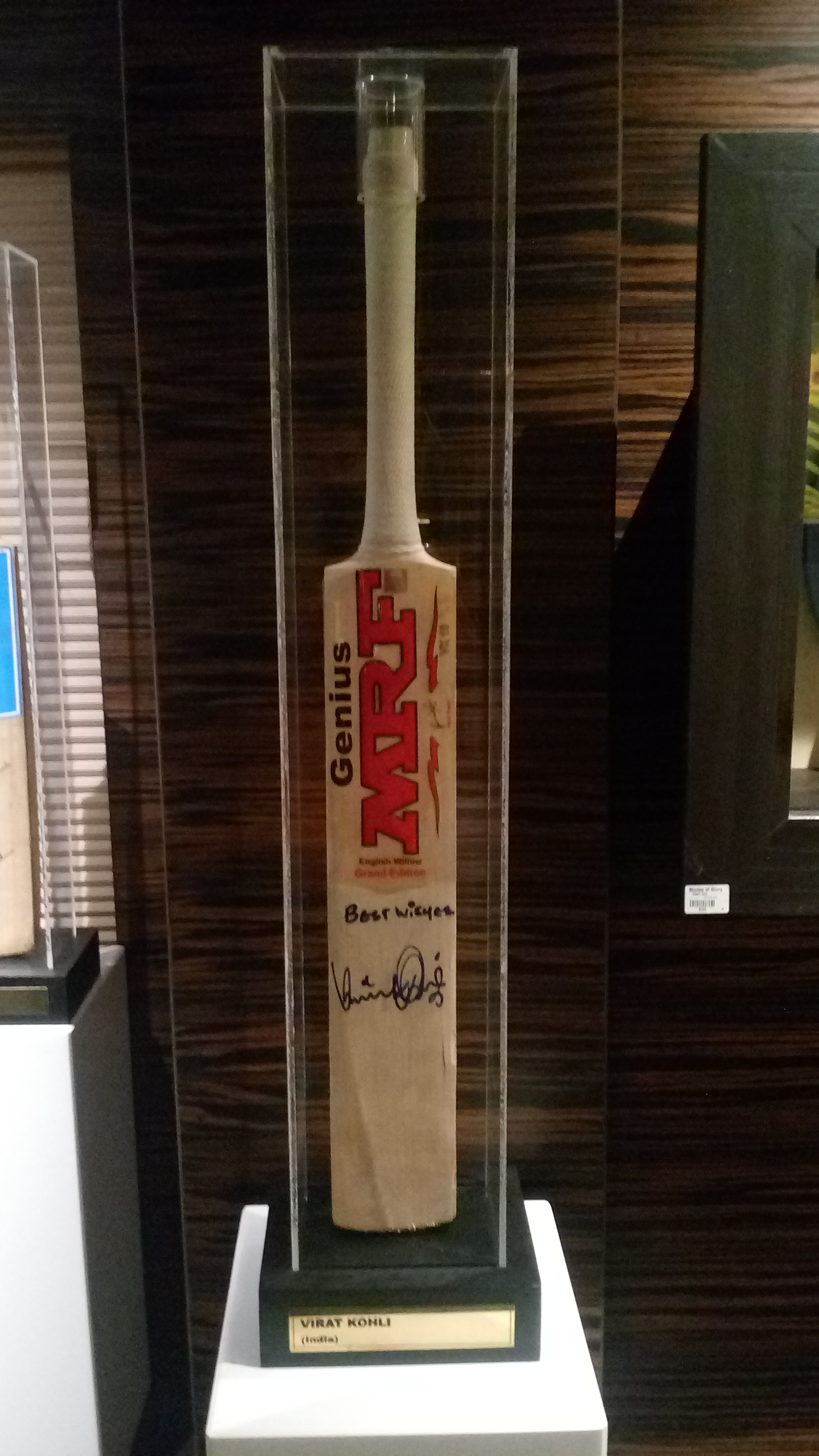
Virat Kohli's signed bat at Blades of Glory Cricket Museum, Pune

Kohli has gained international acclaim for his athletic achievements and widespread popularity, earning a prominent place among the world's most renowned athletes, as per ESPN. In 2014, American Appraisal conducted an evaluation of Kohli's brand value and determined it to be $56.4 million, placing him fourth on the list of India's most valued celebrity brands. The following two years saw Kohli's brand value soar higher. As per a report published in October 2016 by Duff & Phelps, Kohli's brand worth had increased to $92 million, second only to that of Bollywood actor Shah Rukh Khan. In 2017, Kohli was recognized by Forbes as the seventh "Most Valuable Brand among Athletes", surpassing renowned sports figures such as Lionel Messi, Rory McIlroy, and Stephen Curry, with a brand estimation of $14.5 million. By September of the same year, Kohli had amassed endorsement agreements with 17 distinct brands, and he announced that he would only endorse products that he personally uses and believes in. The following year, he was featured on Time magazine's annual list of the 100 most influential people in the world. In 2019, Kohli was the only cricketer included in Forbes' list of "World's 100 Highest-Paid Athletes". He was ranked 100th on the list, with earnings estimated at $25 million, with $21 million being procured through endorsements, and the remainder from salary and tournament winnings. Furthermore, in March 2019, Kohli was named the brand ambassador of the mobile esports platform, Mobile Premier League. Kohli's earning potential continued to climb, and in 2020, he attained the 66th spot in Forbes compilation of the top 100 highest-paid athletes in the world for the year 2020, with estimated earnings exceeding $26 million. In April 2021, Vivo appointed Kohli as their brand ambassador ahead of the Indian Premier League.

In 2012, Kohli was recognized as one of the best-dressed men by the fashion magazine GQ, appearing on their annual list alongside figures such as Barack Obama. Six years later, in 2018, a documentary highlighting Kohli's cricketing career was released on National Geographic channel. The film aimed to celebrate his accomplishments in the sport. The following year, on the eve of the 2019 Cricket World Cup a tribute was bestowed upon Kohli. Madame Tussauds renowned for their lifelike wax figures, unveiled an exquisite creation of Kohli in London. Continuing the string of accolades, in 2019, on the eleventh anniversary of his international debut, Kohli was honoured with a stand named after him at the Feroz Shah Kotla Stadium in Delhi, making him the youngest cricketer to receive such a recognition. In November of the same year, an Indian animated superhero television series entitled Super V premiered, featuring a fictionalized portrayal of Kohli's teenage years and his discovery of superpowers.

== Outside cricket ==
=== Personal life ===
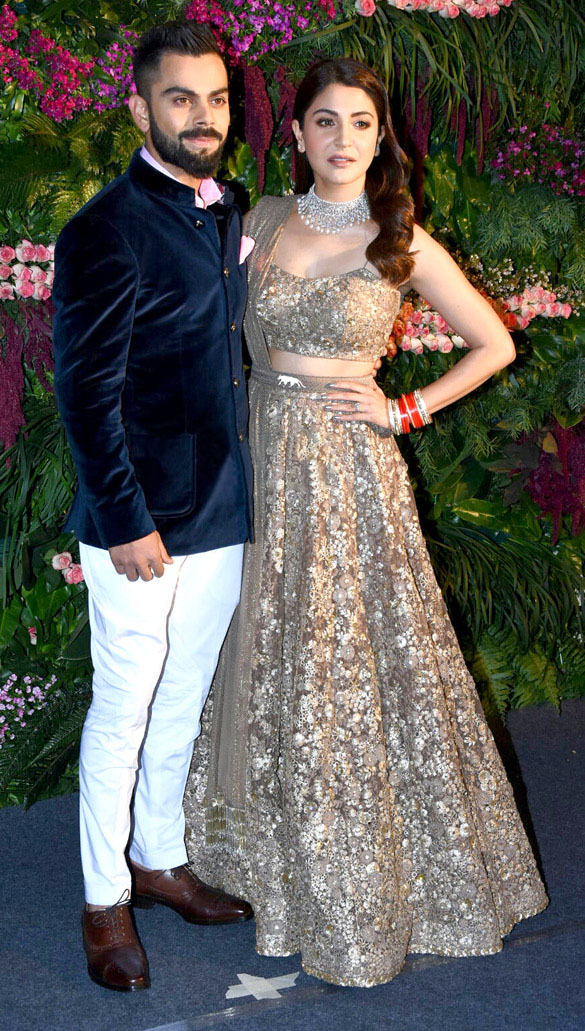
Kohli with wife Anushka Sharma in their Mumbai reception

Kohli's romantic association with Bollywood actress Anushka Sharma, which commenced in 2013, earned the duo the moniker of "Virushka". During an interview with Graham Bensinger, Kohli divulged that he had encountered Sharma for the first time, when they were both were engaged in a promotional shoot for Clear shampoo. Their union since then has attracted significant media interest, with persistent rumours and speculations swirling around in the press, as both parties remained reticent about publicly discussing the relationship. On 11 December 2017, the couple exchanged vows in an intimate ceremony held in Florence, Italy, becoming one of the most talked-about celebrity couples in India. On 11 January 2021, the couple had their first child, a daughter. On 15 February 2024, the couple welcomed their second child, a son.

In 2018, Kohli disclosed that he had made the decision to adopt a vegetarian diet in an effort to alleviate the symptoms of a cervical spine issue caused by elevated levels of uric acid. This condition was impacting his finger movements, and thus, affecting his performance as a batsman. He made a conscious effort to abstain from consuming meat, as part of his regimen for maintaining optimal health. He has since clarified that his dietary choices do not align with a vegan lifestyle and he continues to consume dairy products. Kohli is widely recognized for his physical fitness and intense training regimen. He has been an advocate of leading a healthy lifestyle, which involves regular exercise and a nutritious diet. His hard work and discipline in this area have earned him the reputation of being one of the fittest cricketers in the world.

Kohli has acknowledged a belief in superstitions, and owns various lucky charms and rituals that he feels bring him good fortune on the cricket field. This includes wearing of black wristband and a single pair of gloves. Furthermore, Kohli has been observed sporting a kara, a traditional bangle often worn for religious or spiritual purposes, on his right arm since 2012. In addition to the previously mentioned superstitions, Kohli has also established the ritual of consistently donning white shoes on the cricket field. He has a number of tattoos, including of the Hindu deity Shiva, the names of his parents, and his ODI and Test match cap numbers.

=== Commercial investments ===
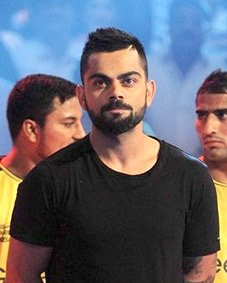
Kohli at the opening ceremony of the Pro Kabaddi League in June 2016

Kohli made his initial business foray by becoming a co-owner of the Indian Super League club FC Goa. He also ventured into the fashion industry, partnering with Anjana Reddy's Universal Sportsbiz to launch WROGN, a brand focused on men's casual wear. Rounding out his ventures in 2014, Kohli became both a shareholder and brand ambassador for Sport Convo, a social networking platform designed to bring sports fans together.

The following year, saw an expansion of his portfolio. Kohli made an investment of ₹90 crore (US$9.6 million) to establish "Chisel", a chain of health clubs and fitness centers across India, a joint venture with Chisel India and Cornerstone Sport and Entertainment. His interest in sports franchises continued as he became a co-owner of the UAE Royals in the International Premier Tennis League and the Bengaluru Yodhas, a Pro Wrestling League franchise. In 2016, Kohli helped launch Stepathlon Kids, an initiative aiming to encourage children to adopt healthy lifestyles. The year 2017 proved to be particularly active for his brand-building efforts. He partnered with Puma to introduce his athletic lifestyle brand, One8. Diversifying into the hospitality sector, Kohli established Nueva, a fine-dining restaurant in New Delhi, and later that year, he launched One8 Commune, a chain of restaurant bars, marking his inaugural venture into the food and beverage industry.

Kohli's investments continued in 2019 with an investment in Galactus Funware Technology Pvt Ltd, the parent company of Mobile Premier League (MPL). Early in 2020, Kohli and his spouse, jointly invested ₹2.5 crore in Digit, an insurance-based startup. The year 2021 saw him become an athlete-investor and ambassador for Hyperice, a wellness brand known for its recovery products. He also extended his support to Blue Tribe, a startup specializing in plant-based meat products. Additionally, Kohli invested an undisclosed amount in Rage Coffee, a coffee brand, and was appointed its brand ambassador. Most recently, in May 2025, Kohli made significant moves in the sports and athleisure market. He joined the sports athleisure brand Agilitas as an investor, concluding his eight-year contract with Puma. In the same month, he also became a Strategic Investor in the World Bowling League (WBL).

=== Philanthropy ===
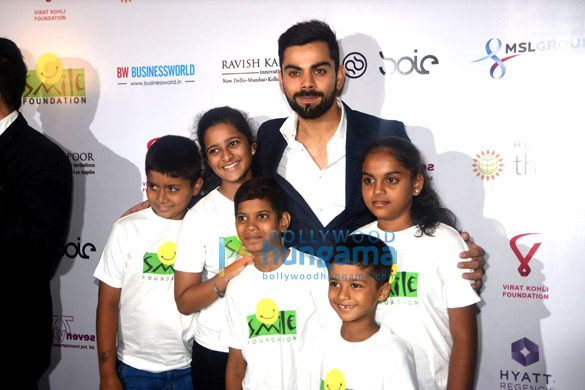
Virat Kohli at charity dinner for Smile Foundation

In 2013, Kohli established the "Virat Kohli Foundation", a philanthropic organization dedicated to supporting underprivileged children. The foundation collaborates with various non-governmental organizations (NGOs). One of its early initiatives was in 2014, when it participated in a charity auction organized by eBay and Save the Children India.

To raise funds, the foundation has organized several high-profile charity events. Among the most notable are the "Celebrity Clasico" football matches, which pit Indian cricketers against Bollywood actors. In 2016, the foundation partnered with the Smile Foundation to support education for underprivileged children, hosting a charity dinner at the Grand Hyatt in Mumbai to raise awareness and funds for the cause. The foundation's scope expanded later that year when Kohli partnered with the ABIL Foundation to aid senior citizens in old-age homes.

In 2017, he extended his efforts internationally, hosting a gala dinner in London to support the Justice and Care organization ahead of a Champions Trophy match. The same year marked the establishment of the Athlete Development Programme (ADP), created to support promising young athletes with guidance in coaching, training, fitness, and nutrition. Golfer Aadil Bedi is one of the notable athletes who has benefited from this initiative. To support the ADP, the foundation also partnered with the RP-Sanjiv Goenka Group to host a celebrity golf tournament, with the proceeds directly funding the program.

During the COVID-19 pandemic, Kohli and his wife, made notable contributions. In 2020, they pledged donations to the PM CARES Fund and the Maharashtra Chief Minister's Relief Fund. In 2021, amidst India's severe second wave, they organized a fundraising campaign on Ketto titled '#InThisTogether'. Starting with a personal donation of ₹2 crore, the campaign surpassed its initial goal and ultimately raised over ₹11 crore for COVID relief efforts. Later in the year, the foundation further diversified its work by collaborating with the Awaaz Foundation to establish a rehabilitation center for stray animals in Mumbai. Kohli has noted that this initiative was inspired by his wife's passion for animal welfare.

== Career summary ==
Kohli has made 86 centuries which includes 7 double centuries in international cricket—30 centuries including 7 double centuries in Test cricket, 55 centuries in One Day Internationals (ODIs) surpassing the record of Sachin Tendulkar, and 1 century in T20I.

=== Test match performance ===
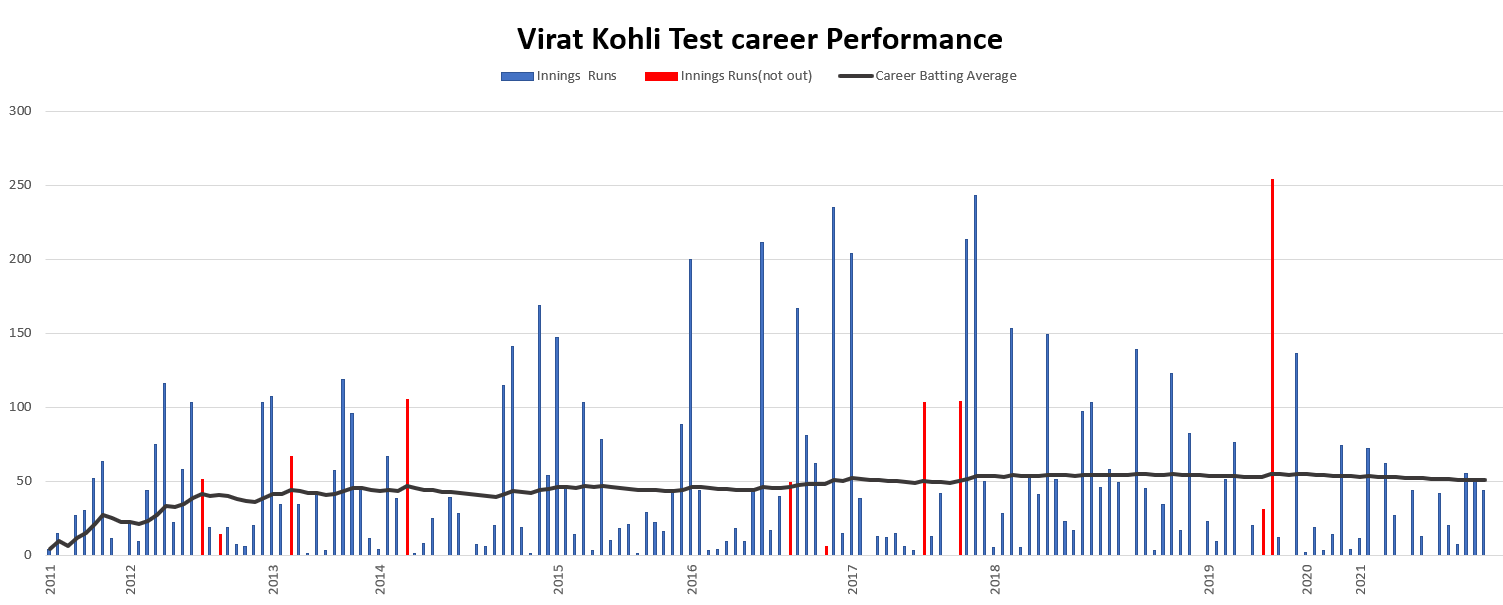
An innings-by-innings breakdown of Kohli's Test batting career, showing runs scored (blue and red (not out) bars) and the black line is his career batting average.

=== ODI match performance ===
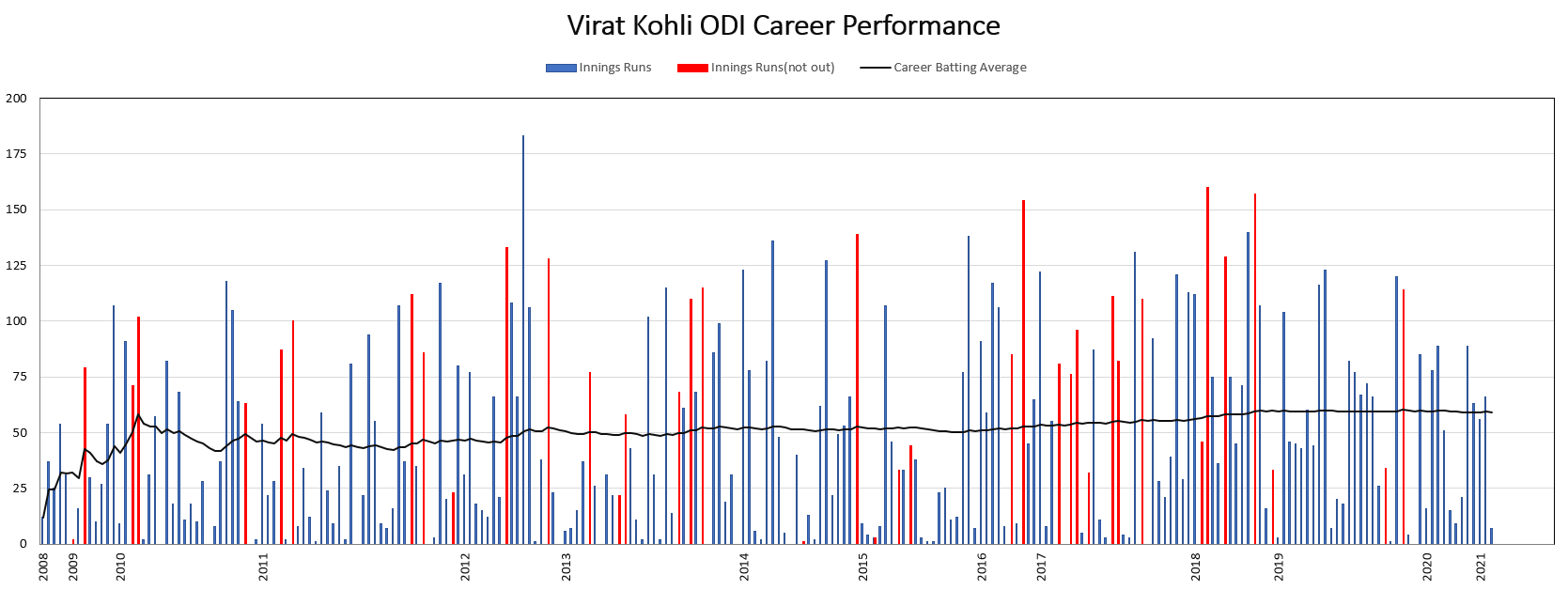
An innings-by-innings breakdown of Kohli's ODI batting career, showing runs scored (blue and red (not out) bars) and the black line is his career batting average.

=== T20I match performance ===
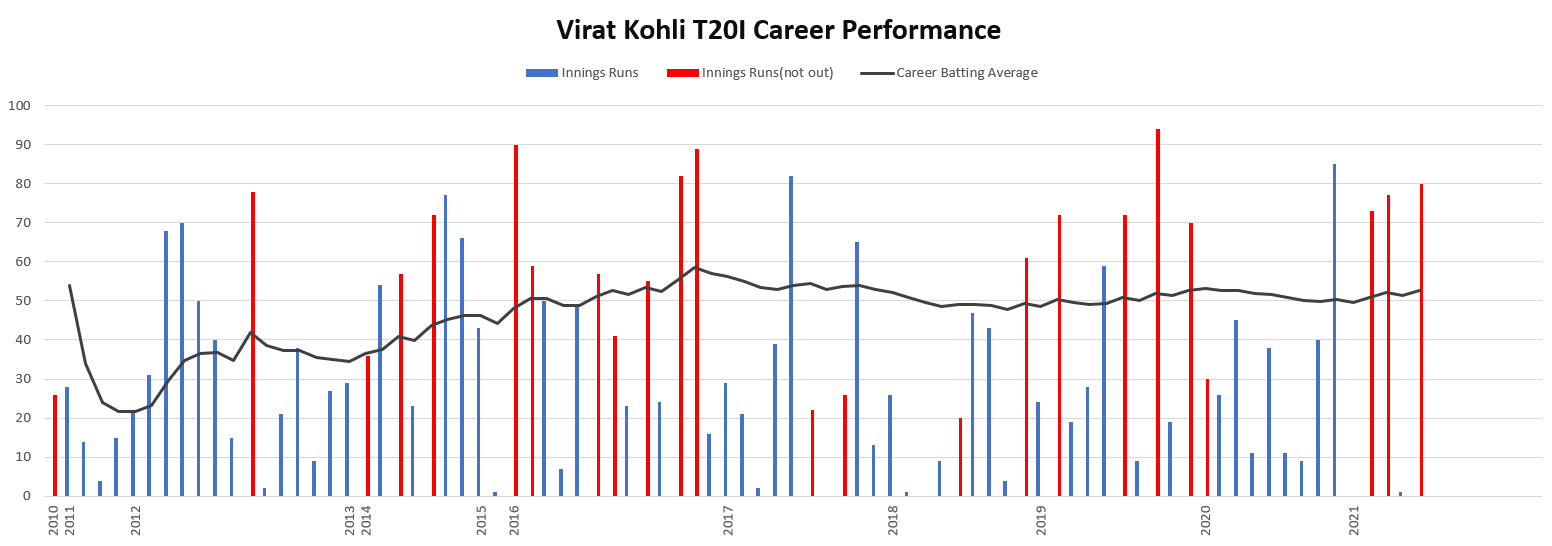
An innings-by-innings breakdown of Kohli's T20I batting career, showing runs scored (blue and red (not out) bars) and the black line is his career batting average.

== Awards and honours ==
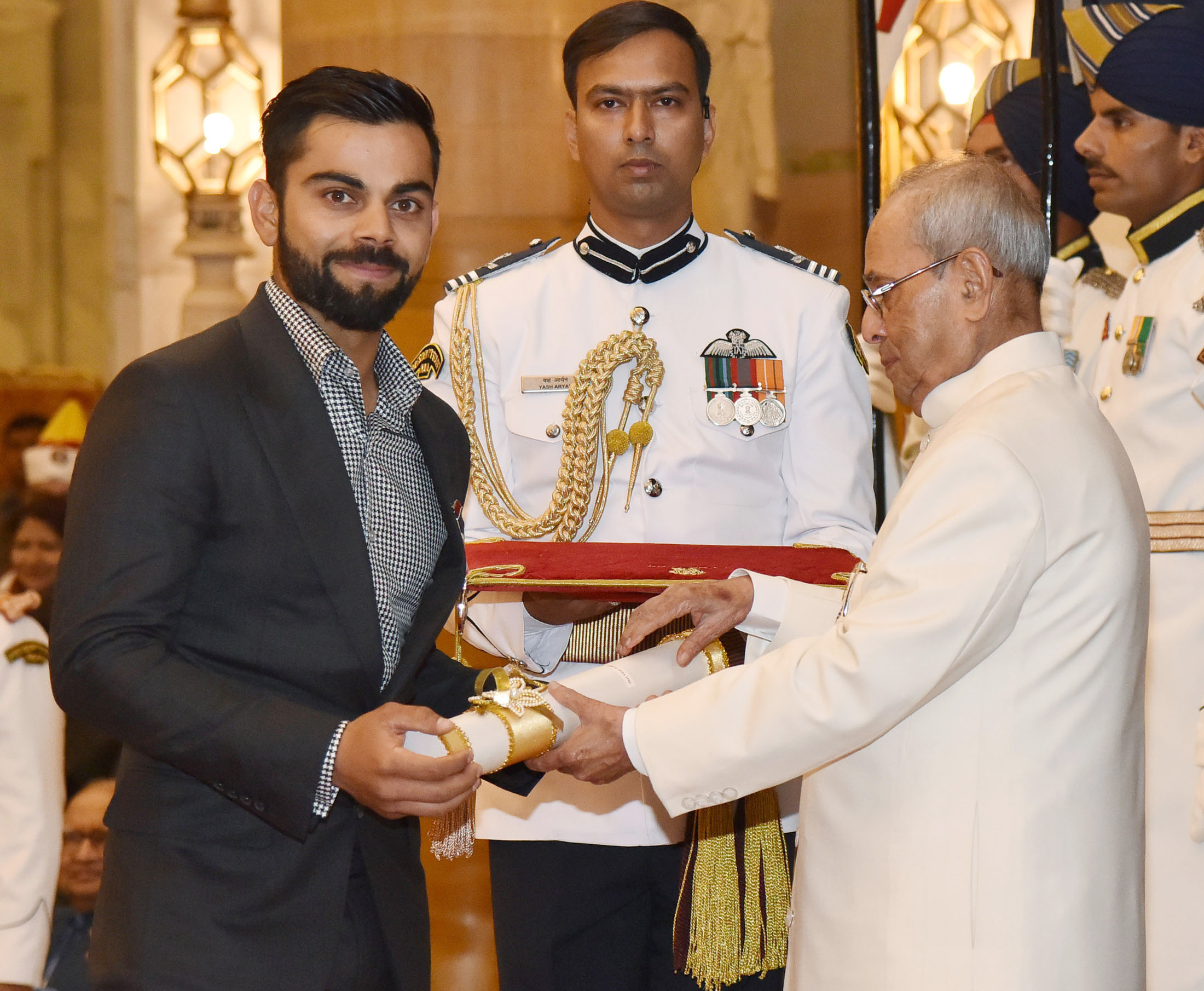
Kohli receiving the Padma Shri award from President Pranab Mukherjee in March 2017

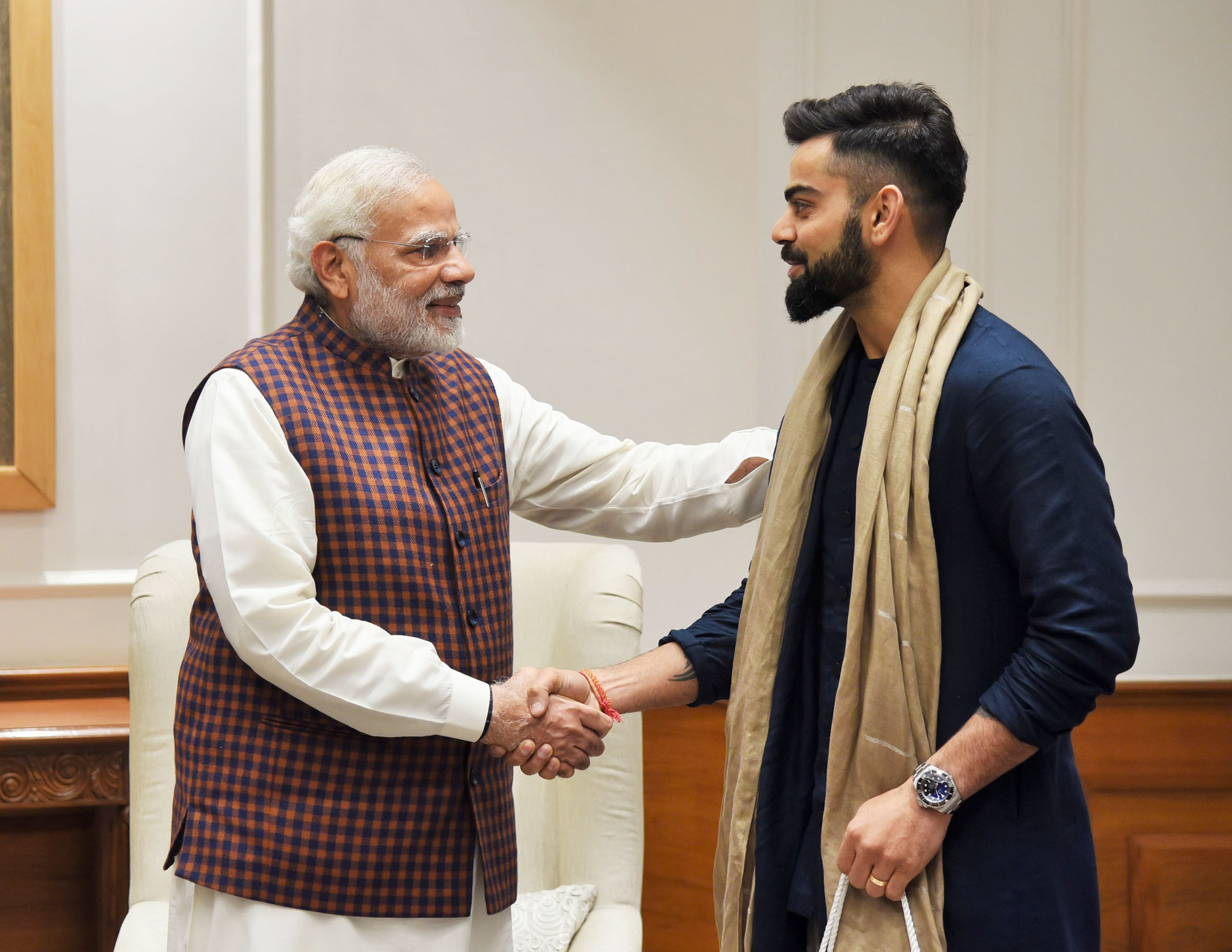
Kohli meeting Prime Minister of India Narendra Modi in New Delhi in 2017

=== National honours ===
- 2013 – Arjuna Award, second highest sporting honour.
- 2017 – Padma Shri, India's fourth highest civilian award.
- 2018 – Rajiv Gandhi Khel Ratna Award, India's highest sporting honour.

=== Sporting honours ===
- Sir Garfield Sobers Award (ICC Men's Cricketer of the Decade): 2011–2020
- Sir Garfield Sobers Trophy (ICC Cricketer of the Year): 2017, 2018.
- ICC Men's ODI Cricketer of the Decade: 2011–2020.
- ICC ODI Cricketer of the Year: 2012, 2017, 2018, 2023.
- ICC Test Cricketer of the Year: 2018.
- ICC Spirit of Cricket: 2019.
- ICC ODI Team of the Year: 2012, 2014, 2016, 2017, 2018, 2019, 2023 (captain in 2016–2019).
- ICC Test Team of the Year: 2017, 2018, 2019 (captain in 2017–2019).
- ICC Men's T20I Team of the Year: 2022.
- ICC Men's Test Team of the Decade: 2011–2020 (captain).
- ICC Men's ODI Team of the Decade: 2011–2020.
- ICC Men's T20I Team of the Decade: 2011–2020.
- Polly Umrigar Award for International Cricketer of the Year: 2011–12, 2014–15, 2015–16, 2016–17, 2017–18
- Wisden Leading Cricketer in the World: 2016, 2017, 2018.
- Wisden Cricketer of the Year: 2019.
- ICC Men's Player of the Month: October 2022
- CEAT International Cricketer of the Year: 2011–12, 2013–14, 2017– 18, 2018–19
- ICC Cricket World Cup – Player of the Tournament: 2023.
- ICC T20I World Cup – Player of the Tournament: 2014, 2016.
- Indian Premier League Orange Cap for most runs: 2016, 2024.
- Barmy Army – International Player of Year: 2017, 2018.
- ESPNcricinfo – ODI Batting Performance of the Year: 2012.

=== Other honours and awards ===
- People's Choice Awards India for Favourite Sportsperson: 2012
- GQ Sportsman of the year: 2013
- CNN-News18 Indian of the Year: 2017
- People for the Ethical Treatment of Animals (PETA) India's Person of the Year: 2019
- Delhi & District Cricket Association (DDCA) renamed a stand after Kohli at Feroz Shah Kotla, Delhi.

== See also ==
- List of players who have scored 10,000 or more runs in One Day International cricket
- List of cricketers by number of international centuries scored
- List of cricketers who have scored centuries in both innings of a Test match
- List of cricketers with centuries in all international formats
- List of most-followed Instagram accounts

== Notes ==
Awards
Preceded by Kumar Sangakkara	ODI Player of the Year; 2012	Succeeded by Kumar Sangakkara
Preceded by Ravichandran Ashwin	Cricketer of the Year; 2017 & 2018	Succeeded by Ben Stokes
Preceded by Quinton de Kock	ODI Player of the Year; 2017 & 2018	Succeeded by Rohit Sharma
Preceded by Steve Smith	Test Player of the Year; 2018	Succeeded by Pat Cummins
Preceded by Kane Williamson	Spirit of Cricket; 2019	Succeeded by Daryl Mitchell
Preceded by None	Cricketer of the Decade; 2011–2020	Succeeded by –
Preceded by None	ODI Player of the Decade; 2011–2020	Succeeded by –
Preceded by Babar Azam	ODI Player of the Year; 2023	Succeeded by Azmatullah Omarzai
