= CRCR =

CRCR may refer to:

- Crooked Rain, Crooked Rain, a 1994 album by Pavement
- Crete Carrier Corporation reporting mark, see List of reporting marks: C
- Core-to-core transmission, an interprogram communications protocol used by mainframes of Burroughs Medium Systems
- CrCr, a double-cream gene in Equine coat color genetics
- CRCR1 a.k.a. DCC, Deleted in Colorectal Cancer
- CRCR Animation Studio, a French animation studio

== See also ==
- 2CR (disambiguation)
- CR2 (disambiguation)
- CR (disambiguation)
