= Crossroads Mall (Mumbai) =

Shopping mall in Mumbai, India

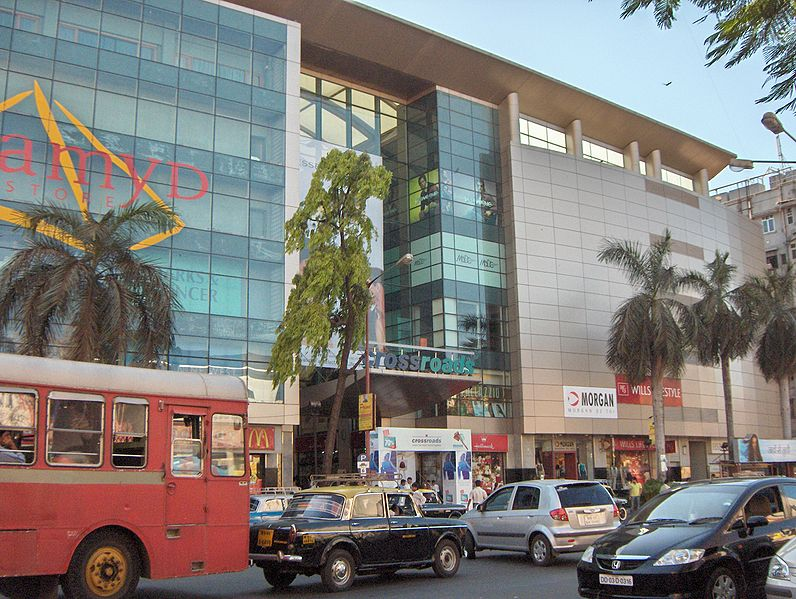
Crossroads Mall, Mahalaxmi, Mumbai

Crossroads, renamed and known as Sobo Central and Brand Factory, was a shopping mall in Mahalaxmi, Mumbai. Opened in September 1999 by Piramal Holdings Ltd., a subsidiary of a major pharmaceutical group, it was Mumbai's oldest shopping mall. It was also India's second oldest mall management company, after Chennai's Spencer Plaza. The mall covered an area of 14,000 square metres (150,000 sq ft), spread over four buildings in the city centre.

In April 2024, the mall was purchased by K Raheja Corp to be redeveloped into luxury residences.

== Features ==
- Teflon roof
- Video-screen walls
- Car elevators
