= Comptes Rendus (disambiguation) =

Comptes Rendus (proceedings) may refer to several academic journals or conference proceedings:

- Comptes rendus de l'Académie d'Agriculture de France
- Comptes rendus de l'Académie bulgare des sciences
- Comptes rendus des séances de l'Académie des inscriptions et belles-lettres, is an academic journal of history, philology, and archeology published by the Académie des Inscriptions et Belles-Lettres
- Comptes rendus de l'Académie des sciences de Paris, a French scientific journal which has been published since 1666 by the Académie des Sciences. Several subsections exist.
- Comptes rendus de l'Académie des sciences de Roumanie
- Comptes rendus de l'Académie des sciences de l'URSS, the French version of the Proceedings of the USSR Academy of Sciences
- Comptes rendus des travaux du Laboratoire Carlsberg
- Comptes rendus de la Société de biologie, also known as Comptes rendus et mémoires de la Société de biologie and Comptes rendus de la Société de biologie et des ses filiales
- Comptes rendus des séances de la Société entomologique de Belgique
- Comptes rendus de la Societé française de gynécologie
- Comptes rendus des séances de la Société des sciences et des lettres de Varsovie

It may also refer to:

- Compte rendu, a document published in February 1781 presenting the state of France's finances
