= Crotonyl-CoA carboxylase/reductase =

Class of enzymes

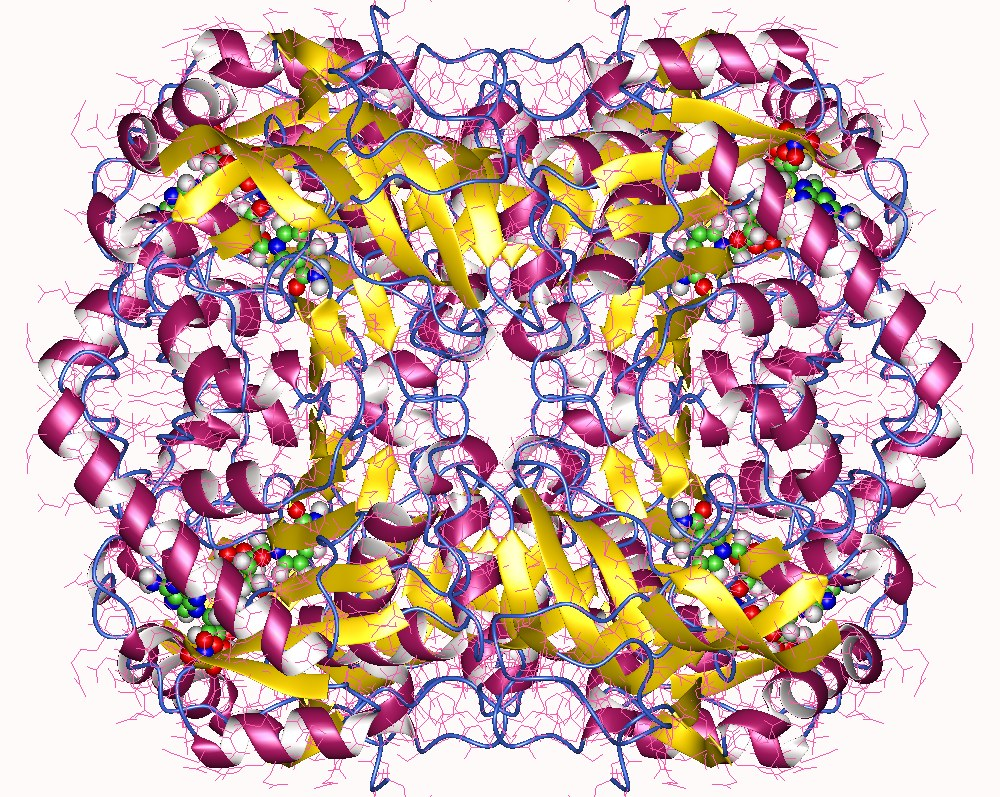
- Crotonyl-CoA carboxylase/reductase tetramer, Streptomyces sp. NRRL 2288

Identifiers
- EC no.: 1.3.1.85

Databases
- IntEnz: IntEnz view
- BRENDA: BRENDA entry
- ExPASy: NiceZyme view
- KEGG: KEGG entry
- MetaCyc: metabolic pathway
- PRIAM: profile
- PDB structures: RCSB PDB PDBe PDBsum
Search
- PMC: articles
- PubMed: articles
- NCBI: proteins

Crotonyl-CoA carboxylase/reductase (EC 1.3.1.85, CCR, crotonyl-CoA reductase (carboxylating)) is an enzyme with systematic name (2S)-ethylmalonyl-CoA:NADP^{+} oxidoreductase (decarboxylating). This enzyme catalyses the following chemical reaction

(2S)-ethylmalonyl-CoA + NADP^{+} $\rightleftharpoons$ (E)-but-2-enoyl-CoA + CO_{2} + NADPH + H^{+}

The reaction is catalysed in the reverse direction. This reaction is a part of the ethylmalonyl-CoA pathway (EMC).

Normally, the Glyoxylate cycle is present in microorganisms to assimilate acetate. However, in microorganisms that do not have a Glyoxylate cycle, CCR is important for its role in an alternative pathway to assimilate acetate.

There are various CCR homologues and in S. tsukubaensis' genome the CCR homologues ccr1 and allR were identified and recognized to be a part of two separate metabolic pathways. The homologue ccr1 is involved in the EMC pathway, whereas the homologue allR is involved in biosynthesis of immunosuppressants FK506/FK520.
