= Critical Review =

Critical Review may refer to:

- The Critical Review (newspaper), English newspaper published from 1756 to 1817
- The Critical Review (Chinese journal), a Chinese academic journal published from 1922 to 1933
- Critical Review (Brown University), student publication of course evaluations at Brown University, published since 1976
- Critical Review (American journal), a scholarly quarterly published by the Critical Review Foundation since 1986
