= Campbell River =

Campbell River may refer to:

== Canada ==
- Campbell Branch Little Black River, in Quebec, Canada; and Maine, United States
- Campbell River, British Columbia, Canada, a city on Vancouver Island
- Campbell River (Vancouver Island), the river on which the city is located, and its namesake
- Campbell River (Semiahmoo Bay), a smaller river in Langley and Surrey, British Columbia
- Campbell River 11, properly known as Campbell River Indian Reserve No. 1, an Indian reserve surrounded by the City of Campbell River

== Others countries ==
- Campbell River (Tasmania), Australia
- Campbell Branch Little Black River, in Maine, United States; and Quebec, Canada
