= Rajkumar Sharma (cricketer) =

Indian cricketer and coach (born 1965)

Cricket information
- Batting: Right-handed
- Bowling: Right-arm Off break

Domestic team information
- Years: Team
- 1986–1991: Delhi
- Source: Rajkumar Sharma at Cricinfo

Rajkumar Sharma is a cricket coach and a former Ranji Trophy player. He was born in Saharanpur, Uttar Pradesh on 18 June 1965.

Sharma was a right-handed batsman and a right-arm off break bowler. He represented Delhi in First Class Cricket (1986–1991) matches and also some List A matches.

On 29 September 2016, He was awarded the Dronacharya Award for his coaching.

He appointed coach of Malta national cricket team for 2019 Spain Triangular T20I Series from 29 to 31 March 2019.

Rajkumar Sharma is now a bowling coach of the senior men's team of the Delhi & District Cricket Association (DDCA)

Sharma founded West Delhi Cricket Academy on 30 May 1998. The academy is known for training batsmen like Virat Kohli.
