= 2CR China Radio Network =

2CR
- Australia

History
- First air date: 1994

Links
- Website: http://www.2cr.com.au

2CR (China Radio Network) is a citizen's band station that broadcasts Chinese radio programs in the Australian cities of Sydney, Melbourne and Brisbane. It offers a wide range of informative news and radio shows through their proprietary receiver set. It is distinct from the ABC Central West radio station in New South Wales which also uses this call sign.

== History ==
2CR began as a Chinese community radio on 26 September 1994. Due to popular demand it extended its radio station to Melbourne, before moving from its George Street (Sydney) office to its present Ultimo address in August 1996. Test free-to-air broadcasts were conducted during January 1998 on the 96.9FM frequency (now Nova 96.9); later temporary FM broadcasts were also broadcast on FM94.5, FM90.9 and FM95.3, the latter being used for frequent broadcasts. Programs in Mandarin were presented later in the 2-3PM timeslot. 2CR extended from Sydney and Melbourne to Brisbane on 18 October 2005.

== Receivers ==
2CR released its series of proprietary receivers in 1995. The popular models in use today are the CR-88 and the 'digital receivers'. Apart from tuning into 2CR broadcasts, they can also be set to 2AC (another citizen's band Chinese radio channel), with the new digital receivers also tuning to local community radio stations in various languages. 2CR's frequency is locked into 152.075 MHz and 2AC is locked to 152.250 MHz.

== Programs ==
2CR broadcasts programs in Cantonese and Mandarin. It is also a mirror for BBC's Voice of America in Cantonese, as well as broadcasting RTHK's news programs. Finance, cooking, religious and children's programs are also offered in the daily schedule.

== Sources ==
- 2CR website
