= Center for Cerebrovascular Research =

US research center

The Center for Cerebrovascular Research at the University of California, San Francisco is a collective of faculty and staff investigating matters related to cerebral circulation, particularly cerebrovascular disease resulting from narrowing of major blood vessels in the brain and vascular malformation of the brain. While research offices are located on Parnassus campus, San Francisco General Hospital hosts the center's laboratories and facilities. The center coordinates with additional faculty in various fields of neuroscience and vascular biology. Sponsors include the National Institute of Neurological Disorders and Stroke and the UCSF departments of Anesthesia, Neurological Surgery and Neurology.

== History ==
The Center for Cerebrovascular Research was established at the University of California San Francisco in 2000.

== Clinical trials ==
The CCR is a participating in the first attempt at studying brain arteriovenous malformation (BAVM) management using a randomized controlled clinical trial. This multi-center trial (ARUBA: A Randomized Trial of Unruptured Brain Arteriovenous Malformations) has been funded by the National Institute of Neurological Disorders and Stroke (NINDS). The goal of the project is to test the null hypothesis that treatment, by means of interventional procedures, surgery, or radiotherapy offers no difference in the risk of death or symptomatic stroke, and no better functional outcome than does conservative management at five years from discovery of an unruptured brain arteriovenous malformation (BAVM).

=== Specific areas of research ===
- Arteriovenous malformation
- Subarachnoid hemorrhage
- Cerebral aneurysm

== Accolades ==
William L. Young, M.D., Recipient of the 2009 Excellence in Research Award NIH Announces Expansion of Rare Diseases Clinical Research Network Nineteen New and Returning Consortia to be Awarded $117 Million
