= Kindle Banking Systems =

- Industry: Banking software
- Founded: 1979
- Successor: ACT; Mysis
- Headquarters: Dublin, Ireland
- Products: Bankmaster

Kindle Banking Systems was a banking solutions company that originated from a bespoke banking systems project in 1979 for the Irish merchant bank Ansbacher Bank. Its main product was a modular banking system known as Bankmaster. The system originally ran on the ICL hardware platform. The relationship with the UK-based computer manufacturer facilitated Kindle's significant customer base in Asia and Africa.

Kindle was the first high-tech Irish company which achieved the status of world leader in its field.

== History ==
Kindle's main product Bankmaster, was a modular System25 Assembler-based banking system and started development in 1979 as a bespoke banking systems project in the Irish merchant bank Ansbacher Bank.

The company was originally called MA Systems, then Triple A Systems before finally settling on Kindle Banking Systems. The driving force behind the design and development of Bankmaster was Cian Kinsella. Led by MD and founder Tony Kilduff, the company had an impressive sales record developing many lasting customer relationships in the UK, Africa, India, Asia and Latin America.

By 1987, according to the RBS Market Report, there were 170 sites operating Bankmaster worldwide. Standard Chartered Bank was the largest user of Bankmaster ― the company formed a spin-off joint venture with Kindle specifically to support its own deployments. State Bank of India deployed the branch platform, Branchpower to 2000 branches throughout India. The system allowed branches to operate in an off-line mode ― this made it popular with retail banks in countries where the communications infrastructure was poor. The Bank of England and eight other central banks (mainly in Africa) used the treasury modules of Bankmaster.

In 1991, Kindle was acquired by a rival company, ACT, for £37.1 million and was renamed as ACT Kindle. ACT was subsequently acquired by Misys in 1995 ― the Kindle brand was retained until 2001 at which point it was subsumed into the Misys branding. During the later part of the 1990s, sales of Bankmaster declined ― whilst the Bankmaster solution set was considered to be functionally rich, the core technology had been allowed to become obsolete.

Between 1994 and 2000, the company made a significant investment in developing a new generation retail banking system, called Bankmaster-RS. It was developed in cooperation with the Colombian bank Coomeva. Bankmaster-RS struggled to deliver the planned functionality and was never as widely adopted as its predecessor. In 2001, the company partnered with Computer Solutions International to integrate their On-Q system into Bankmaster.
