= Chart Rulership =

Ruling planet in an astrology chart

== Chart rulers ==
=== Classic astrology ===
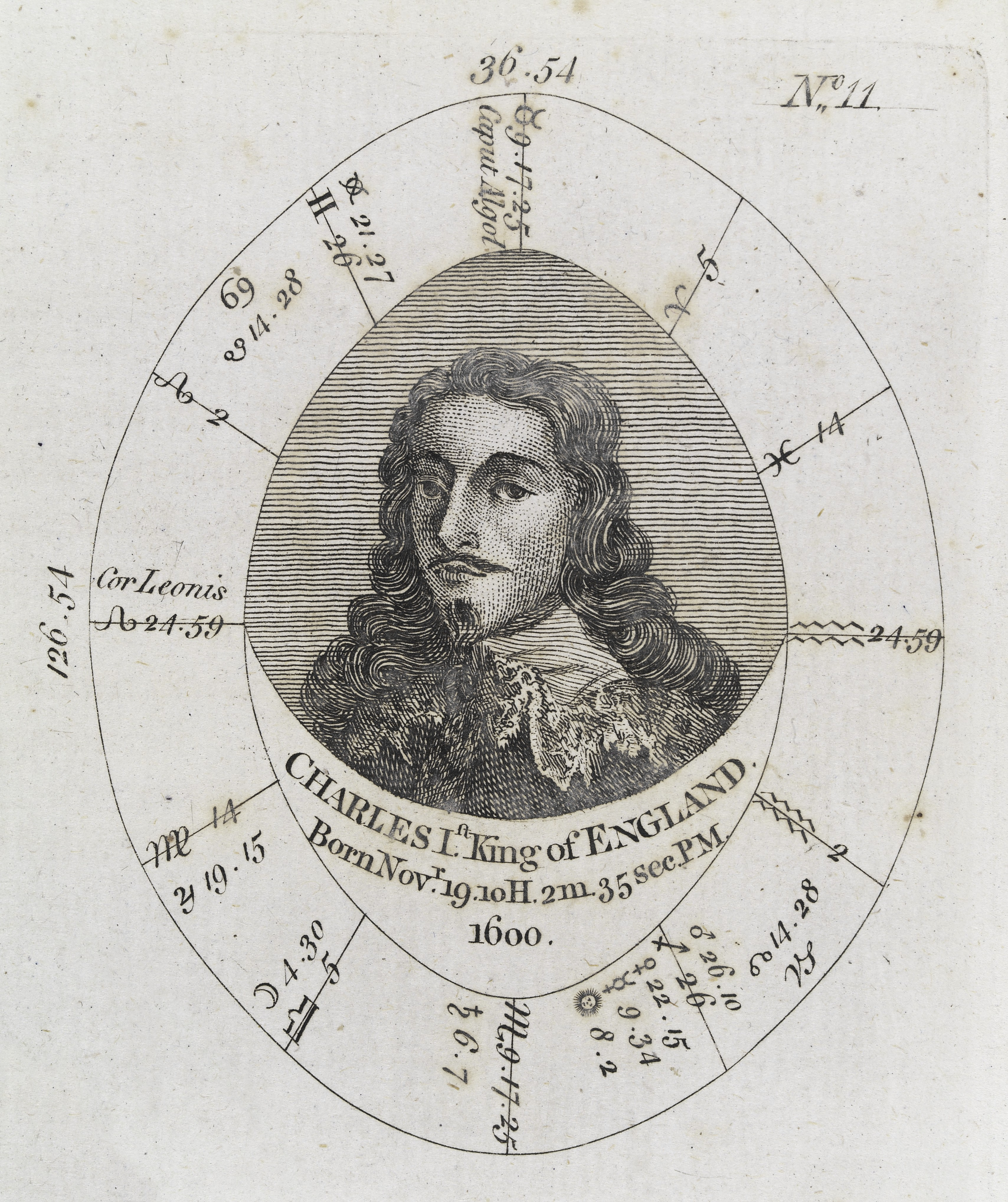
Astrological birth chart for Charles I, King of England

Astrological planet glyphs

Astrological sign glyphs

New millennium astrological chart calculated for 00:01 January 1st, 2000 in New York City, USA

Chart rulership has changed over time due to the discovery of previously unknown planets. In classic astrology, Mars, Venus, Mercury, Jupiter, and Saturn were the only planets visible to the naked eye and ruled the astrological signs along with the Sun and Moon. While astrologers are aware that the Sun and Moon themselves are not planets, they are often grouped as such due to their perceived movement around the Earth (since birth charts are mapped from the perspective of a person's position on Earth). The Sun and Moon are also referred to as luminaries and each have their own significance in horoscopic astrology alongside their roles as planets. The Sun, Moon, and aforementioned observable planets are known as the classic or ancient rulers are still used by some astrologers today.

Classic rulers
Ascendant planet	Ruling planet
Aries	Mars
Taurus	Venus
Gemini	Mercury
Cancer	Moon
Leo	Sun
Virgo	Mercury
Libra	Venus
Scorpio	Mars
Sagittarius	Jupiter
Capricorn	Saturn
Aquarius	Saturn
Pisces	Jupiter

=== Modern astrology ===
After the discovery of Uranus, Neptune, and Pluto starting in the 18th century, chart rulership was adjusted to include these previously unobserved planets accordingly. Today all eight planets, as well as the Sun and Moon, are commonly attributed in chart rulership. Some astrologers also include Ceres as a dwarf planet, however, consensus has not yet been reached on its position as a chart ruler. The modern interpretation of chart rulers is most often used though some astrologers will use both classical and modern rulers for reference when interpreting an individual's natal chart. Often in this case the inner planets (Mars, Saturn, and Jupiter) will be referenced as a chart's primary ruler while the outer planets (Uranus, Neptune, and Pluto) become a secondary ruler.

Modern rulers
Ascendant planet	Ruling planet
Aries	Mars
Taurus	Venus
Gemini	Mercury
Cancer	Moon
Leo	Sun
Virgo	Mercury
Libra	Venus
Scorpio	Pluto
Sagittarius	Jupiter
Capricorn	Saturn
Aquarius	Uranus
Pisces	Neptune

The inner planets refer to planets visible to the naked eye. These are the Sun, Moon, Mercury, Venus and Mars. Jupiter and Saturn may or may not be included in this category. They are often instead known as the transpersonal planets because they are a transition from the inner personal aspects of one's life to the outer impersonal. Outer planets include those that need a telescope to be seen, such as Uranus, Neptune, and Pluto. The inner and outer planets are significant to chart rulership because they are said to represent an individual's basic drive and the unconscious. Knowing how many cycles a planet makes around the Earth and how fast a planet makes these cycles allows individuals to understand and master the energy and lessons of that particular planet.

Both inner and outer planets have an influence on an individual's character and behavior. The inner planets influence our everyday reality because of their fast speed of movement. The inner planets appear to cycle around the Earth quickly, which is why they have a stronger and more immediate personal effect. The outer planets take longer to orbit the Sun and represent an overarching theme within someone's life. Since these planets take longer to cycle, their effect can last over generations. For example, Saturn is the slowest planet within the inner planet group as it completes a cycle around the Sun every 29.5 years. It spends an approximate 2.46 years in each sign of the zodiac. Uranus, as the fastest outer planet, takes 84 years to complete a cycle around the Sun and spends about 7 years in each sign.

Despite the modern use of outer planets as ruling planets, a case can often be made for still using classic rulers in place of or alongside these modern rulers. Many astrologers recommend investigating both planets as chart rulers if the client falls into one of these signs, with some going so far as to recommend co-rulership by both if the client cannot determine one's strength over the other. The planet ruling over an individual's chart represents a piece of that person's character that is more important or vital to them and their approach in life than others and thus is crucial in understanding and interpreting a birth chart.

== Determining chart rulers ==
In ancient astrology, planets were originally assigned to rule various signs based on their geometrical order of the apparent distances between the planets and the Sun, as well as their speeds. As astrology became more simplified over time, rulerships were established by the planets' and the signs' shared commonalities. Today's more modern use of the term rulership is a system of affinities, meaning that the ruling planets are often similar to the astrological sign they rule rather than an essential dignity.

When viewing a chart, angles are still significant. This aspect represents the façade that we present to the world, which is how other people perceive us. In most house systems, as there are the Angular, Succedent, and Cadent houses. The Ascendant is the cusp of the first house. From the first cusp, they are numbered counterclockwise with the houses one through six being below the horizon and the houses seven through twelve above the horizon. The first cusp is considered to be the Front Door, or the place we go when we go out into the world to interact with other individuals. Contrary to the Ascendant is the Descendant. Known as the Back Door, the Descendant is where we receive visits from those we know. The door to the roof, the Midheaven (or MC), is the most visible place of the house and is the place where we desire to impress the general world. The hidden, secret door, is the Imum Coeli (or IC) and is the Private Entrance which is only used by those closest to us, such as close friends and family.

The ascendant planet is also known as the rising planet or rising sign which describes the sign's degree on the eastern horizon at the time and location of birth. As the Ascendant represents our first impressions of the world, the sign on the Ascendant displays how we expect to interact with and experience the world. Depending on which zodiac sign is rising, individuals will have a specific view concerning their perception of the world.

In terms of houses, the sign that was rising is the first house, while the other houses follow the sequence and consist of a different sign.

== Rulers in the houses ==
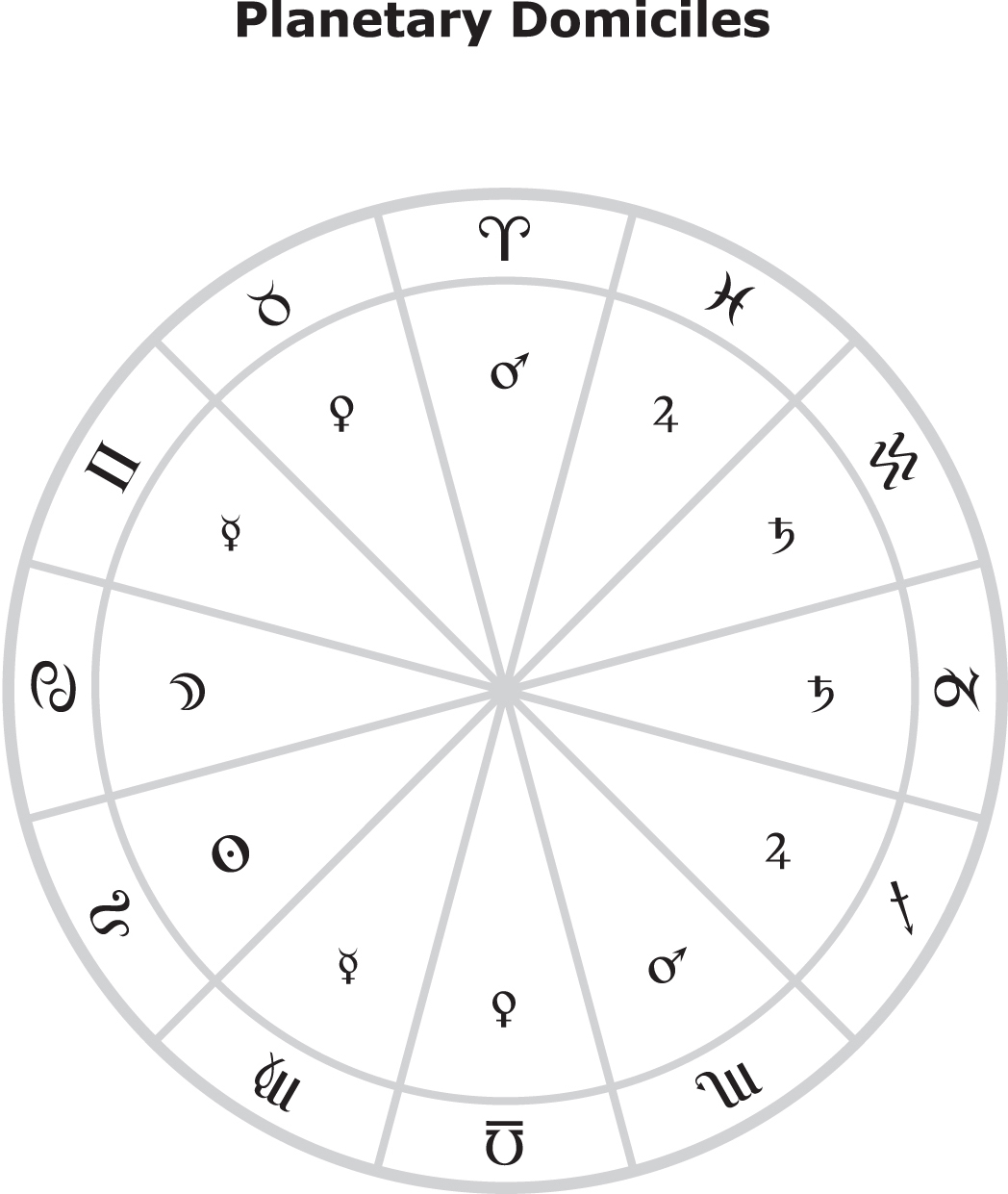
Planetary domiciles

In Hellenistic astrology, the astrological sign that is ruled by a planet is called its house. The house of each specific planet is said to be the place where it rejoiced or had its joys. Each planet has a specific joy in a house that, in Hellenistic tradition, has a different name. Rather than calling and assigning the names of these houses to the signs, ancient astrologers referred to them as traditional names like the Place of God for the 9th house. The other houses have names such as Goddess (3rd house), Good Spirit (11th house), Good Fortune (5th house), Bad Fortune (6th house), Helm (1st house), etc. It is worth noting that in Hellenistic astrology there are some remaining houses which don't relate directly to joys because no planets reside in them. The connection of the joy and the name of the houses provides information on the dates and the determination of how they were used by Hellenistic astrologers.

Many forms of modern astrology borrow this house system. These planetary or astrological houses affect the type of influence displayed by the planets when they are in these various houses. A planet in the first house, for example, may affect an individual's self-image and relation to their immediate environment while the same planet in the sixth house may have an influence on their approach to work and personal health. By knowing the ruling planet in each of these houses one may be able to determine or predict their behaviors and approach to certain situations providing a form of self enlightenment. Jupiter for example is the planet that represents generosity and tolerance. Therefore, if the ruling planet in the first house was Jupiter, an individual would have an altruistic approach to life and generally approach new situations in a kind and benevolent manner. Jupiter in the sixth house would indicate an individual with an honest approach to their work and perhaps a tendency to help others who are less fortunate.

Planets in each of these houses in turn will be influenced by an individual's chart ruler. Leo, for example, has several planets which are ruled by the sun, Leo's chart ruler. As such, the application of chart rulership in astrology becomes a fairly complicated process. The ten astrological planets are expressed through different qualities within the twelve astrological signs and their houses. Depending on each planet's position on an individual's birth chart, they will rule different houses respectively.

== Types of rulership ==
In addition to the use of a house system, Hellenistic and medieval astrologers used four or five kinds of rulership which included domicile, exaltation, trigon/triplicity, bound/term, and decan/face rulership. Modern astrology primarily uses only domicile and exaltation.

Those planets in domicile rulership are powerful when in this occupation as it possesses the resources and self-sufficiency needed to achieve its significations. The relationship between a planet and its domicile can be understood by the relationship between a lord or lady of an estate. The system of domicile lords replicated the importance of the guest-host relationship in the ancient world. If a planet occupies its own domicile, it has great stability and is in direct contact with all its resources to meet its need and accomplish its intended purpose. If another planet is positioned in another's domicile, a planet is dependent on the domicile lord of that sign to provide for the planet's needs, as a guest would rely on a host.

Planets in exaltation operate on the spirit or soul level in which people are connected with their higher selves and their guides. Planets in exaltation become successful by recognition and honor. When a planet is opposite its exaltation sign it is in its fall or downhearted and in shame.

== Signs and their elements ==
The four classical elements also matter in chart rulership. For the past two decades there have been questions regarding the way that the elements got assigned to specific zodiac signs.

The history of the elements and signs is that Vettius Vallen, a Hellenistic astrologer, was one of the first to introduce this idea yet never explicitly said so. Valen isn't believed to be the originator of this element-sign relationship but there are previous and similar schemes in which earlier astronomers assign the signs into triplicities and then associate with a set of planetary rulers. This is known as the triplicity or trigon lords. Other astronomers connect the signs with the four winds and the four cardinal directions. Today the four elements and triplicities are taken for granted and are common in western astrological texts.

The elements and triplicities are now critical when it comes to interpreting one's astrological chart.

=== Triplicity rulerships ===
The 12 signs are put into four elemental groups with each element having 3 signs that are located 120 degrees away from each other. These signs are in trine with one another. beginning with Aries which is the first fire sign, followed by Taurus as an Earth, Gemini which is an air sign and finally Cancer called a water sign. This continues to go on until reaching the last astrological sign of Pisces. Along with the elements words are also used to describe the signs. Fire signs are hot, dry, ardent. Earth signs are heavy, cold, dry. Air signs are light, hot, wet. Water signs are cold, wet and soft. The elements help chart rulership in several ways. This specific rulership is used to weigh the strength, effectiveness and integrity of the planets in a chart.

=== Elements in modern astrology ===
In modern astrology, the elements are used to describe personality based on one's chart. There are characteristics that modern astrologers associate with chart rulership and sign identification. The fire element which consist of the signs Aries, Leo, and Sagittarius are described as fiery, passionate, spontaneous, competitive, confident and creative. There is some negative aspect of this which says that they can be arrogant, self-centered, and attention seekers. Earth signs (Taurus, Virgo, and Capricorn) are known to be grounded, stable, dependable, and practical. People sometimes say they are dull and materialistic. Air signs (Gemini, Libra, Aquarius) are great communicators, intellectual, social, and idealistic. The negative to them is that they are cold and impractical. Finally water signs (Cancer, Scorpio, Pisces) are considered to be all feelings. Often called sensitive, emotional, nurturing and intuitive. The misused part of them is that they can often let their emotions become too strong, they are often thought to be the ones who get most addicted to drugs and alcohol. Each characteristic influences chart rulership because modern astrology uses the elements to specifically interpret the astrological chart and its rulership.

== Rulers as dispositors ==
With the information learned by chart rulership, a dispositor tree can be much better understood. A dispositor is a planet that rules another planet. To illustrate this, consider the planets in Cancer, which the Moon rules. Planets in this sign look to the Moon for guidance concerning how they should express themselves. Ruler planets are considered to impose form and structure on the expression of the planets being ruled. Dispositor trees display how the planets in the chart relate to each other based on these rulerships. By using this type of diagram, uncovering the themes of a natal chart becomes easier because dispositor trees reveal which planets are superior in power and which planets must obey the ruling planets.

When creating a dispositor tree, the planets at the top will be those in their own rulership, or are their own rulers. The rest of the planets are included within the tree starting with those ruled by the planet in rulership, then the planets ruled by the second most powerful planets. This process goes on for all the planets in the chart. However, sometimes three or more planets are linked together and can share rulership or rule together. As per classical astrology, outer planets are also incorporated into the meaning of the chart but are usually not considered to be rulers of a sign. These planets can still influence the matters of the house by being configured to another planet. In this case they influence the actions of that planet. Similarly, asteroids or minor planets (such as Ceres) do not rule signs but they influence the houses they occupy, like the outer planets.

== See also ==
- Planets in astrology § Ruling planets of the astrological signs and houses
