= CRR =

CRR may refer to:

- Capital Requirements Regulation, a European regulation on prudential requirements for credit institutions and investment firms
- Charleston Road Registry Inc., Google's domain name registry
- Coefficient of residuals resistance, (in Statistics) a random measurement on residuals in piecewise regression analysis
- Convergence rate of residuals, (in Statistics) an alternative term with the same meanings as the coefficient of residuals resistance
- Corrour railway station
- Cross River Rail
- Reserve requirement or cash reserve ratio
- Binomial options pricing model or Cox Ross Rubinstein option pricing model
- Clinchfield Railroad
- Cat Righting Reflex, The intrinsic ability for cats to land on their feet by correcting their orientation while falling
- Carolina Algonquian language (ISO 639-3 language code)
- The Center For Reproductive Rights
- Current run rate, in cricket
- Curia Regis roll
- Cross Region Replication, used to copy objects across Amazon S3 buckets in different AWS Regions
- Cost Revenue Ratio, also known as efficiency ratio
