= CEAT Cricket Rating Awards =

Awards

- Awarded for: Excellence in International cricket team and individual achievements
- Presented by: CEAT (company)
- First award: 1995

Highlights
- Most awards: Men's: (India) Virat Kohli (4 awards)
- Website: https://www.ceatcricketrating.com

CEAT Cricket Ratings (CCR) was formed in 1995 in association with Professional Management Group. Three cricketing legends Clive Lloyd, Ian Chappell and Sunil Gavaskar are the members of the Governing Council of the CRR. This rating system takes into account the performances in Test Cricket and One Day Internationals over a period of 12 months from 1 May to 30 April. The system takes into account overall performances, the Batting, Bowling, Fielding and Wicket Keeping.

It is the first International Cricket Rating System to reward and recognize the performances on annual basis. CEAT has also introduced the CCR Best Bowler, CCR Best Batsman, CCR Best Cricketer and CCR Best Cricket Team as well as CEAT Under 19 & T20 ratings.

== Winners of the CEAT Cricket Rating Awards ==
Year	Cricketer of the Year	Team of the Year
1995–96	(Cricket West Indies) Brian Lara	N/A
1996–97	(India) Venkatesh Prasad	Pakistan
1997–98	(Sri Lanka) Sanath Jayasuriya	Australia
1998–99	(South Africa) Jacques Kallis	South Africa
1999–2000	(India) Sourav Ganguly	Australia
2000–01	(Sri Lanka) Muttiah Muralitharan	South Africa
2001–02	(Sri Lanka) Muttiah Muralitharan	Australia
2002–03	(Australia) Ricky Ponting	Australia
2003–04	(Cricket West Indies) Brian Lara	Australia
2004–05	(South Africa) Jacques Kallis	Australia
2005–06	(Australia) Ricky Ponting	Australia
2006–07	(Sri Lanka) Muttiah Muralitharan	Australia
2007–08	(Sri Lanka) Mahela Jayawardene	India
2008–09	(India) Gautam Gambhir	Australia
2009–10	(Australia) Shane Watson	Australia
2010–11	(England) Jonathan Trott	N/A
2011–12	(India) Virat Kohli	Pakistan
2013–14	(India) Virat Kohli	N/A
2014–15	(Sri Lanka) Kumar Sangakkara	N/A
2015–16	(England) Joe Root	N/A
2016–17	(India) Ravichandran Ashwin	
2017–18	(India) Virat Kohli	
2018–19	(India) Virat Kohli	India
2019–20	(India) Rohit Sharma	India
2020-21	Not Awarded	
2021-22	Not Awarded	
2022–23	(India) Shubman Gill	N/A
2023–24	(India) Rohit Sharma	N/A
2024-25	(England) Joe Root	N/A
