= List of Mumbai Indians records =

Mumbai based franchise cricket team of the Indian Premier League

Mumbai Indians are a franchise cricket team based in Mumbai, Maharashtra, that competes in the Indian Premier League.

Founded in 2008, the team is owned by India's biggest conglomerate, Reliance Industries, through its 100% subsidiary IndiaWin Sports. Since its establishment, the team has played its home matches in the 33,108-capacity Wankhede Stadium in Mumbai.

== Listing criteria ==
In general the top five are listed in each category (except when there is a tie for the last place among the five, when all the tied record holders are noted).

== Listing notation ==
Team notation

- (200–3) indicates that a team scored 200 runs for three wickets and the innings was closed, either due to a successful run chase or if no playing time remained
- (200) indicates that a team scored 200 runs and was all out

Batting notation

- (100) indicates that a batsman scored 100 runs and was out
- (100*) indicates that a batsman scored 100 runs and was not out

Bowling notation

- (5–20) indicates that a bowler has captured 5 wickets while conceding 20 runs

Currently playing

- Bold Name indicates a current cricketer

Start Date

- indicates the date the match starts

== Team records ==
=== Team Performance ===
Year	Total	Wins	Losses	No result	Tied and won	Tied and lost	Win %	Position	Summary
2008	14	7	7	0	0	0	50.00	5th	Group Stage
2009	14	5	8	1	0	0	35.72	7th	Group Stage
2010	16	11	5	0	0	0	68.75	1st	Runners-Up
2011	16	10	6	0	0	0	62.50	3rd	Play-offs
2012	17	10	7	0	0	0	58.82	3rd	Play-offs
2013	19	13	6	0	0	0	68.42	2nd	Champions
2014	15	7	8	0	0	0	46.67	4th	Play-offs
2015	16	10	6	0	0	0	62.50	2nd	Champions
2016	14	7	7	0	0	0	50.00	5th	Group Stage
2017	17	12	5	0	1	0	70.59	1st	Champions
2018	14	6	8	0	0	0	42.85	5th	Group Stage
2019	16	11	5	0	1	0	68.75	1st	Champions
2020	16	11	5	0	0	2	75.00	1st	Champions
2021	14	7	7	0	0	0	50.00	5th	Group Stage
2022	14	4	10	0	0	0	28.57	10th	Group Stage
2023	16	9	7	0	0	0	56.25	3rd	Playoffs
2024	14	4	10	0	0	0	28.57	10th	Group Stage
2025	16	9	7	0	0	0	56.25	3rd	Playoffs
2026	14	4	10	0	0	0	28.57	9th	Group Stage
Total	291	155	132	2	2	2	53.95	5 time Champions	
Last Updated: 24 May 2026

=== Head to head in IPL ===
Opponent	Span	Matches	Won	Lost	Tied	No Result	Win %
CSK	2008-2026	43	22	21	0	0	51.16
DC	2008-2026	38	21	17	0	0	55.26
GT	2022-2026	9	4	5	0	0	44.44
KKR	2008-2026	37	25	12	0	0	67.57
LSG	2022-2026	9	3	6	0	0	33.33
PBKS	2008-2026	36	18	17	1	0	51.38
RR	2008-2026	34	17	17	0	0	50.00
RCB	2008-2026	38	21	16	1	0	56.58
SRH	2013-2026	26	14	11	1	0	55.77
defunt teams
DC^{†}	2008-2012	10	6	4	0	0	60.00
GL^{†}	2016-2017	4	1	2	1	0	37.50
KTK^{†}	2011	1	0	1	0	0	0.00
RPS^{†}	2016-2017	6	2	4	0	0	33.33
PWI^{†}	2011-2013	6	5	1	0	0	83.33
Last updated: 24 May 2026 Note: Tie+W and Tie+L indicates matches tied and then won or lost by super over; The result percentage excludes no results and counts ties (irrespective of a tiebreaker) as half a win; The total matches does not include matches played for Champions League T20; †No longer exists.

== Result records ==
=== Greatest win margin (by runs) ===
Margin	Opposition	Venue	Date
146 Runs	DD	Arun Jaitley Stadium, Delhi, India	6 May 2017
102 runs	KKR	Eden Gardens, Kolkata, India	9 May 2018
100 runs	RR	Sawai Mansingh Stadium, Jaipur, India	1 May 2025
99 runs	GT	Narendra Modi Stadium, Ahmedabad	20 April 2026
98 runs	DD	Arun Jaitley Stadium, Delhi, India	17 March 2010
Last Updated: 1 May 2025

=== Greatest win margin (by balls remaining) ===
Balls remaining	Margin	Opposition	Venue	Date
87	8 wickets	KKR	Wankhede Stadium, Mumbai, India	16 May 2008
70	8 wickets	RR	Sharjah Cricket Stadium, Sharjah, UAE	5 October 2021
46	10 wickets	CSK	Sharjah Cricket Stadium, Sharjah, UAE	23 October 2020
43	8 wickets	KKR	Wankhede Stadium, Mumbai, India	31 March 2025
37	9 wickets	CSK	Wankhede Stadium, Mumbai, India	14 May 2008
37	9 wickets	SRH	Rajiv Gandhi International Cricket Stadium, Hyderabad, India	17 May 2015
Last Updated: 31 March 2025

=== Greatest win margins (by wickets) ===
Margin	Opposition	Venue	Date
10 wickets	RR	Sawai Mansingh Stadium, Jaipur, India	20 May 2012
10 wickets	CSK	Sharjah Cricket Stadium, Sharjah, UAE	23 October 2020
9 wickets	CSK	Wankhede Stadium, Mumbai, India	14 May 2008
9 wickets	RCB	M. Chinnaswamy Stadium, Bangalore, India	28 May 2008
9 wickets	SRH	Rajiv Gandhi International Cricket Stadium, Hyderabad, India	17 May 2015
9 wickets	KKR	Wankhede Stadium, Mumbai, India	5 May 2019
9 wickets	DD	Dubai International Stadium, Dubai, UAE	31 October 2020
9 wickets	CSK	Wankhede Stadium, Mumbai, India	20 April 2025
Last Updated: 20 April 2025

=== Narrowest win margin (by runs) ===
Margin	Opposition	Venue	Date
1 run	PWI	Maharashtra Cricket Association Stadium, Pune, India	3 May 2012
1 run	RPS	Rajiv Gandhi International Cricket Stadium, Hyderabad, India	21 May 2017
1 run	CSK	Rajiv Gandhi International Cricket Stadium, Hyderabad, India	12 May 2019
3 runs	PBKS	Wankhede Stadium, Mumbai, India	16 May 2018
4 runs	RR	Brabourne Stadium, Mumbai, India	13 March 2010
4 runs	PBKS	Wankhede Stadium, Mumbai, India	29 April 2013
Last Updated: 24 May 2021

=== Narrowest win margins (by wickets) ===
Margin	Opposition	Venue	Date
2 wickets	CSK	Wankhede Stadium, Mumbai, India	6 May 2012
3 wickets	PBKS	Wankhede Stadium, Mumbai, India	10 April 2019
4 wickets	PBKS	Brabourne Stadium, Mumbai, India	30 March 2010
4 wickets	KKR	Wankhede Stadium, Mumbai, India	25 May 2011
4 wickets	PBKS	I. S. Bindra Stadium, Mohali, India	25 April 2012
4 wickets	RR	Eden Gardens, Kolkata, India	24 May 2013
4 wickets	KKR	Wankhede Stadium, Mumbai, India	9 April 2017
4 wickets	SRH	Wankhede Stadium, Mumbai, India	12 April 2017
4 wickets	RCB	M. Chinnaswamy Stadium, Bengaluru, India	14 April 2017
4 wickets	CSK	Arun Jaitley Stadium, Delhi, India	1 May 2021
4 wickets	SRH	Wankhede Stadium, Mumbai, India	17 April 2025
Last Updated: 17 April 2025

=== Tied Matches ===
Opposition	Venue	Date
GL	Saurashtra Cricket Association Stadium, Rajkot, India	29 April 2017
SRH	Wankhede Stadium, Mumbai, India	2 May 2019
RCB	Dubai International Cricket Stadium, Dubai, UAE	28 September 2020
PBKS	Dubai International Cricket Stadium, Dubai, UAE	18 October 2020
Last Updated: 19 October 2020

=== Greatest loss margin (by runs) ===
Margin	Opposition	Venue	Date
103 runs	CSK	Wankhede Stadium, Mumbai	23 April 2026
87 runs	RR	Sawai Mansingh Stadium, Jaipur, India	17 April 2013
85 runs	SRH	Dr. Y.S. Rajasekhara Reddy ACA-VDCA Cricket Stadium, Visakhapatnam, India	8 May 2016
76 runs	PBKS	Punjab Cricket Association Stadium, Mohali, India	10 May 2011
66 runs	PBKS	Punjab Cricket Association Stadium, Mohali, India	25 April 2008
Last Updated: 26 May 2023

=== Greatest loss margin (by balls remaining) ===
Balls remaining	Margin	Opposition	Venue	Date
48	10 wickets	DC	DY Patil Stadium, Navi Mumbai, India	27 April 2008
41	10 wickets	RR	Wankhede Stadium, Mumbai, India	20 May 2011
32	9 wickets	RPS	Wankhede Stadium, Mumbai, India	9 April 2016
31	7 wickets	DD	Wankhede Stadium, Mumbai, India	16 April 2012
29	7 wickets	KKR	Sheikh Zayed Cricket Stadium, Abu Dhabi, UAE	23 September 2021
Last Updated: 8 October 2021

=== Greatest loss margins (by wickets) ===
Margin	Opposition	Venue	Date
10 wickets	DC	DY Patil Stadium, Navi Mumbai, India	27 April 2008
10 wickets	RR	Wankhede Stadium, Mumbai, India	20 May 2011
10 wickets	SRH	Sharjah Cricket Stadium, Sharjah, UAE	3 November 2020
9 wickets	RCB	Wanderers Stadium, Johannesburg, South Africa	3 May 2009
9 wickets	KKR	Eden Gardens, Kolkata, India	19 April 2010
9 wickets	RCB	Wankhede Stadium, Mumbai, India	9 May 2012
9 wickets	DD	Arun Jaitley Stadium, Delhi, India	21 April 2013
9 wickets	RPS	Wankhede Stadium, Mumbai, India	9 April 2016
9 wickets	PBKS	M. A. Chidambaram Stadium, Chennai, India	23 April 2021
9 wickets	RR	Sawai Mansingh Stadium, Jaipur, India	22 April 2024
Last Updated: 22 April 2024

=== Narrowest loss margin (by runs) ===
Margin	Opposition	Venue	Date
1 run	PBKS	Wankhede Stadium, Mumbai, India	21 May 2008
2 runs	RR	Newlands, Durban, South Africa	14 May 2009
2 runs	RCB	M. Chinnaswamy Stadium, Bangalore, India	4 April 2013
3 runs	PBKS	Newlands, Durban, South Africa	29 April 2009
3 runs	RPS	Wankhede Stadium, Mumbai, India	24 April 2017
3 runs	SRH	Wankhede Stadium, Mumbai, India	17 May 2022
Last Updated: 17 May 2022

=== Narrowest loss margin (by balls remaining) ===
Balls remaining	Margin	Opposition	Venue	Date
0 balls	5 wickets	RR	Sawai Mansingh Stadium, Jaipur, India	26 May 2008
0 balls	3 wickets	GL	Wankhede Stadium, Mumbai, India	16 April 2016
0 balls	1 wicket	SRH	Rajiv Gandhi International Cricket Stadium, Hyderabad, India	12 April 2018
0 balls	7 wickets	DD	Wankhede Stadium, Mumbai, India	14 April 2018
0 balls	2 wickets	RCB	M. A. Chidambaram Stadium, Chennai, India	9 April 2021
0 balls	3 wickets	CSK	DY Patil Stadium, Navi Mumbai, India	21 April 2022
Last Updated: 21 April 2022

=== Narrowest loss margins (by wickets) ===
Margin	Opposition	Venue	Date
1 wicket	CSK	Wankhede Stadium, Mumbai, India	7 April 2018
1 wicket	SRH	Rajiv Gandhi International Cricket Stadium, Hyderabad, India	12 April 2018
2 wickets	RCB	M. A. Chidambaram Stadium, Chennai, India	9 April 2021
2 wickets	RCB	Shaheed Veer Narayan Singh International Cricket Stadium, Raipur, India	10 May 2026
3 wickets	GL	Wankhede Stadium, Mumbai, India	16 April 2016
3 wickets	RR	Sawai Mansingh Stadium, Jaipur, India	22 April 2018
3 wickets	CSK	DY Patil Stadium, Navi Mumbai, India	21 April 2022
3 wickets	GT	Wankhede Stadium, Mumbai, India	6 May 2025
Last Updated: 10 May 2026

== Team scoring records ==
=== Highest Totals ===
Score	Opposition	Venue	Date
247/9	DC	Arun Jaitley Stadium, Delhi	27 April 2024
246/5	SRH	Rajiv Gandhi International Cricket Stadium, Hyderabad	27 March 2024
243/5	SRH	Wankhede Stadium, Mumbai	29 April 2026
235/9	SRH	Sheikh Zayed Cricket Stadium, Abu Dhabi	7 October 2021
234/5	DC	Wankhede Stadium, Mumbai	7 April 2024
Last updated: 29 April 2026

=== Lowest Totals ===
Score	Opposition	Venue	Date
87	PBKS	Punjab Cricket Association Stadium, Mohali, India	10 May 2011
87	SRH	Wankhede Stadium, Mumbai, India	24 April 2018
92	DD	Wankhede Stadium, Mumbai, India	16 April 2012
92	RR	Sawai Mansingh Stadium, Jaipur, India	17 April 2013
92	SRH	Dr. Y.S. Rajasekhara Reddy ACA-VDCA Cricket Stadium, Visakhapatnam, India	8 May 2016
Last updated: 10 October 2020

=== Highest Totals Conceded ===
Score	Opposition	Venue	Date
277/3	SRH	Rajiv Gandhi International Cricket Stadium, Hyderabad	27 March 2024
257/4	DC	Arun Jaitley Stadium, Delhi, India	27 April 2024
249/4	SRH	Wankhede Stadium, Mumbai	29 April 2026
240/4	RCB	Wankhede Stadium, Mumbai	12 April 2026
235/1	RCB	Wankhede Stadium, Mumbai	10 May 2015
Last updated: 29 April 2026

=== Lowest Totals Conceded ===
Score	Opposition	Venue	Date
66	DD	Arun Jaitley Stadium, Delhi, India	6 May 2017
67	KKR	Wankhede Stadium, Mumbai, India	16 May 2008
79	CSK	Wankhede Stadium, Mumbai, India	5 May 2013
90/9	RR	Sharjah Cricket Stadium, Sharjah, UAE	5 October 2021
95	DD	Arun Jaitley Stadium, Delhi, India	10 April 2011
95	KKR	St George's Park Cricket Ground, Port Elizabeth, South Africa	27 April 2009
Last updated: 9 October 2021

=== Highest match aggregate ===
Aggregate	Team 1	Team 2	Venue	Date
523/8	SRH (277/3)	MI (246/5)	Rajiv Gandhi International Cricket Stadium, Hyderabad, India	27 March 2024
504/13	DC (257/4)	MI (247/9)	Arun Jaitley Stadium, Delhi, India	27 April 2024
492/9	MI (243/5)	SRH (249/4)	Wankhede Stadium, Mumbai, India	29 April 2026
462/9	RCB (240/4)	MI (222/5)	Wankhede Stadium, Mumbai, India	12 April 2026
457/9	LSG (228/5)	MI (229/4)	Wankhede Stadium, Mumbai, India	4 May 2026
Last updated: 4 May 2026

=== Lowest match aggregate ===
Aggregate	Team 1	Team 2	Venue	Date
135/12	KKR (67)	MI (68/2)	Wankhede Stadium, Mumbai, India	16 May 2008
184/11	RR (90/9)	MI (94/2)	Sharjah Cricket Stadium, Sharjah, UAE	21 October 2021
185/13	MI (92)	DD (93/3)	Wankhede Stadium, Mumbai, India	16 April 2012
189/11	MI (94/8)	RR (95/3)	Sawai Mansingh Stadium, Jaipur, India	29 April 2011
194/12	DD (95)	MI (99/2)	Arun Jaitley Stadium, Delhi, India	10 April 2011
Last updated: 9 October 2021

== Individual Records (Batting) ==
=== Most runs ===
Rank	Runs	Player	Innings	Period
1	6,159	Rohit Sharma	232	2008–2026
2	3,973	Suryakumar Yadav	123	2012–2026
3	3,412	Kieron Pollard	171	2010–2022
4	2,416	Ambati Rayudu	107	2010–2017
5	2,334	Sachin Tendulkar	78	2008–2013
Last Updated: 24 May 2026

=== Fastest runs getter ===
Runs	Batsman	Innings	Record Date	Reference
1,000	Lendl Simmons	23	6 May 2017	
2,000	Sachin Tendulkar	63	20 May 2012	
3,000	Suryakumar Yadav	95	23 March 2025	
4,000	Rohit Sharma	151	10 November 2020	
5,000	Rohit Sharma	192	21 May 2023	

=== Highest individuals score ===
Rank	Runs	Player	Opposition	Venue	Date
1	123*	Ryan Rickelton	SRH	Wankhede Stadium, Mumbai, India	29 April 2026
2	114*	Sanath Jayasuriya	CSK	Wankhede Stadium, Mumbai, India	14 May 2008
3	112*	Quinton de Kock	PBKS	Wankhede Stadium, Mumbai, India	16 April 2026
4	109*	Rohit Sharma	KKR	Eden Gardens, Kolkata, India	12 May 2012
5	105*	Rohit Sharma	CSK	Wankhede Stadium, Mumbai, India	14 April 2024
Last Updated: 29 April 2026

=== Highest career average ===
Rank	Average	Player	Innings	Not out	Runs	Period
1	50.22	Cameron Green	16	7	452	2023-2023
2	39.96	Lendl Simmons	29	2	1,079	2014–2017
3	37.66	JP Duminy	23	8	565	2009–2018
4	36.44	Suryakumar Yadav	123	14	3,973	2012–2026
5	35.73	Tilak Varma	65	13	1,858	2022–2026
Qualification: 15 innings. Last Updated: 24 May 2026

=== Highest strike rates ===
Rank	Strike rate	Player	Runs	Balls	Period
1	152.00	Hardik Pandya†	2,122	1,396	2015–2026
2	151.52	Suryakumar Yadav†	3,973	2,622	2012–2026
3	147.32	Kieron Pollard	3,412	2,316	2010–2022
4	144.70	Tilak Varma†	1,858	1,284	2022–2026
5	144.36	Sanath Jayasuriya	768	532	2008–2010
Qualification= 500 balls faced. Last Updated: 24 May 2026

=== Most 50+ scores ===
Rank	50+ scores	Player	Innings	Period
1	43	Rohit Sharma†	232	2011–2026
2	32	Suryakumar Yadav†	123	2012–2026
3	16	Kieron Pollard	171	2010–2022
4	15	Ishan Kishan†	84	2018–2024
5	14	Sachin Tendulkar	78	2008–2013
5	14	Ambati Rayudu	107	2010–2017
Last Updated: 24 May 2026

=== Most centuries ===
Rank	Centuries	Player	Innings	Period
1	2	Suryakumar Yadav	123	2012–2026
1	2	Rohit Sharma	232	2011–2026
3	1	Cameron Green	16	2023
3	1	Ryan Rickelton	26	2025–2026
3	1	Lendl Simmons	29	2014–2017
3	1	Sanath Jayasuriya	30	2008–2010
3	1	Quinton de Kock	46	2019 - 2026
3	1	Tilak Varma	65	2022–2026
3	1	Sachin Tendulkar	78	2008–2013
Last Updated: 29 April 2026

=== Most Sixes ===
Rank	Sixes	Player	Innings	Period
1	272	Rohit Sharma†	232	2011–2026
2	223	Kieron Pollard	171	2010–2022
3	157	Suryakumar Yadav†	123	2012–2026
4	128	Hardik Pandya†	120	2015–2026
5	106	Ishan Kishan†	84	2018–2024
Last Updated: 24 May 2026

=== Most Fours ===
Rank	Fours	Player	Innings	Period
1	565	Rohit Sharma†	232	2011–2026
2	428	Suryakumar Yadav†	123	2012–2026
3	295	Sachin Tendulkar	78	2008–2013
4	221	Ishan Kishan†	84	2018–2024
5	218	Kieron Pollard	171	2010–2022
Last Updated: 24 May 2026

=== Highest strike rates in an innings ===
Rank	Strike rate	Player	Runs	Balls Faced	Opposition	Venue	Date
1	390.00	Romario Shepherd	39*	10	DC	Wankhede Stadium, Mumbai, India	7 April 2024
2	346.15	Kieron Pollard	45*	13	DC	Brabourne Stadium, Mumbai, India	13 April 2010
3	321.42	Tim David	45*	14	RR	Wankhede Stadium, Mumbai, India	30 April 2023
4	312.50	Hardik Pandya	25*	8	CSK	Wankhede Stadium, Mumbai, India	3 April 2019
4	312.50	Sherfane Rutherford	25	8	RR	Assam Cricket Association Stadium, Guwahati, India	7 April 2026
Qualification: Minimum 25 runs. Last Updated: 7 April 2026

=== Most sixes in an innings ===
Rank	Sixes	Player	Opposition	Venue	Date
1	11	Sanath Jayasuriya	CSK	Wankhede Stadium, Mumbai, India	14 May 2008
2	10	Kieron Pollard	PBKS	Wankhede Stadium, Mumbai, India	10 April 2019
3	9	Hardik Pandya	KKR	Eden Gardens, Kolkata, India	28 April 2019
3	9	Ishan Kishan	RCB	Dubai International Cricket Stadium, Dubai, UAE	28 September 2020
3	9	Sharfane Rutherford	RCB	Wankhede Stadium, Mumbai	12 April 2026
Last Updated: 29 April 2026

=== Most fours in an innings ===
Rank	Fours	Player	Opposition	Venue	Date
1	14	Dinesh Karthik	DD	Wankhede Stadium, Mumbai, India	9 April 2013
1	14	Lendl Simmons	PBKS	Punjab Cricket Association Stadium, Mohali, India	21 May 2014
3	13	Suryakumar Yadav	SRH	Sheikh Zayed Cricket Stadium, Abu Dhabi, UAE	8 October 2021
4	12	Sachin Tendulkar	PBKS	Wankhede Stadium, Mumbai, India	21 May 2008
4	12	Sachin Tendulkar	KTK	Wankhede Stadium, Mumbai, India	15 April 2011
4	12	Rohit Sharma	KKR	Eden Gardens, Kolkata, India	12 May 2012
4	12	Rohit Sharma	KKR	Eden Gardens, Kolkata, India	8 April 2015
4	12	Suryakumar Yadav	SRH	Wankhede Stadium, Mumbai, India	6 May 2024
Last Updated: 6 May 2024

=== Most runs in a season ===
Rank	Runs	Player	Matches	Innings	Season
1	673	Suryakumar Yadav	15	15	2025
2	618	Sachin Tendulkar	15	15	2010
3	605	Suryakumar Yadav	16	16	2023
4	553	Sachin Tendulkar	16	16	2011
5	540	Lendl Simmons	13	13	2015
Last Updated: 30 May 2025

=== Most ducks ===
Rank	Ducks	Player	Innings	Period
1	17	Rohit Sharma†	232	2011–2026
2	13	Harbhajan Singh	84	2008–2017
3	11	Suryakumar Yadav†	123	2012–2026
4	9	Ambati Rayudu	107	2010–2017
5	7	Ishan Kishan†	84	2018–2024
Last Updated: 24 May 2026

== Individual Records (Bowling) ==
=== Most career wickets ===
Rank	Wickets	Player	Matches	Innings	Period
1	187	Jasprit Bumrah	158	158	2013–2026
2	170	Lasith Malinga	122	122	2009–2019
3	127	Harbhajan Singh	136	134	2008–2017
4	71	Mitchell McClenaghan	56	56	2015–2019
4	71	Hardik Pandya	131	95	2015–2026
Last Updated: 24 May 2026

=== Best figures in an innings ===
Rank	Figures	Player	Opposition	Venue	Date
1	6/12	Alzarri Joseph	SRH	Rajiv Gandhi International Cricket Stadium, Hyderabad, India	6 April 2019
2	5/5	Akash Madhwal	LSG	M. A. Chidambaram Stadium, Chennai, India	24 May 2023
3	5/10	Jasprit Bumrah	KKR	DY Patil Stadium, Navi Mumbai, India	9 May 2022
4	5/13	Lasith Malinga	DD	Arun Jaitley Stadium, Delhi, India	10 April 2011
5	5/18	Harbhajan Singh	CSK	Wankhede Stadium, Mumbai, India	22 April 2011
Last Updated: 24 May 2023

=== Best career average ===
Rank	Average	Player	Wickets	Runs	Balls	Period
1	19.35	Mitchell Johnson	31	600	504	2013–2017
2	19.79	Lasith Malinga	170	3,365	2,827	2009–2019
3	21.55	Munaf Patel	40	862	696	2011–2013
4	23.47	Piyush Chawla	36	845	600	2021–2024
5	23.74	Jasprit Bumrah	187	4,441	3,631	2013–2026
Qualification: 500 balls. Last Updated: 24 May 2026

=== Best career economy rate ===
Rank	Economy rate	Player	Wickets	Runs	Balls	Period
1	6.95	Harbhajan Singh	127	3,385	2,919	2008–2017
2	7.14	Lasith Malinga	170	3,366	2,827	2009–2019
2	7.14	Mitchell Johnson	31	600	504	2013–2017
4	7.24	Zaheer Khan	26	664	550	2009–2014
5	7.33	Jasprit Bumrah	187	4,441	3, 631	2013–2026
Qualification: 500 balls. Last Updated: 24 May 2026

=== Best career strike rate ===
Rank	Strike rate	Player	Wickets	Runs	Balls	Period
1	16.25	Mitchell Johnson	31	600	504	2013–2017
2	16.62	Lasith Malinga	170	3,365	2,827	2009–2019
3	16.67	Piyush Chawla	36	845	600	2021–2024
4	17.40	Munaf Patel	40	862	696	2011–2013
5	17.66	Trent Boult†	62	1,568	1,095	2020–2026
Qualification: 500 balls. Last Updated: 24 May 2026

=== Most four-wickets (& over) hauls in an innings ===
Rank	Four-wicket hauls	Player	Innings	Balls	Wickets	Period
1	7	Lasith Malinga	122	2,827	170	2009–2019
2	5	Jasprit Bumrah†	158	3,631	187	2013–2026
3	3	Munaf Patel	31	696	40	2011–2013
4	2	Ashwani Kumar†	10	183	17	2025–2026
4	2	Akash Madhwal†	13	262	19	2023–2024
4	2	Trent Boult†	50	1,095	62	2020–2026
4	2	Harbhajan Singh	134	2,919	127	2008–2017
Last Updated: 24 May 2026

=== Best economy rates in an innings ===
Rank	Economy	Player	Overs	Runs	Wickets	Opposition	Venue	Date
1	1.42	Akash Madhwal	3.3	5	5	LSG	M. A. Chidambaram Stadium, Chennai, India	24 May 2023
2	2.00	Lasith Malinga	3	6	2	CSK	Wankhede Stadium, Mumbai, India	5 May 2013
2	2.00	Mitchell Johnson	4	8	2	PWI	Maharashtra Cricket Association Stadium, Pune, India	11 May 2013
3	2.25	Shaun Pollock	4	9	1	CSK	Wankhede Stadium, Mumbai, India	14 May 2008
3	2.25	Harbhajan Singh	4	9	1	PBKS	Centurion Park, Centurion, South Africa	12 May 2009
3	2.25	Lasith Malinga	4	9	3	DC	Rajiv Gandhi International Cricket Stadium, Hyderabad, India	24 April 2011
Qualification: 12 balls bowled. Last Updated: 24 May 2023

=== Best strike rates in an inning ===
Rank	Strike rate	Player	Balls	Runs	Wickets	Opposition	Venue	Date
1	3.0	Sanath Jayasuriya	6	3	2	RR	Kingsmead, Durban, South Africa	14 May 2009
1	3.0	Kieron Pollard	6	6	2	RR	Eden Gardens, Kolkata, India	24 May 2013
1	3.0	Corey Anderson	6	18	2	SRH	Dubai International Cricket Stadium, Dubai, UAE	30 April 2014
1	3.0	Kieron Pollard	6	8	2	PBKS	Sheikh Zayed Cricket Stadium, Abu Dhabi, UAE	28 September 2021
5	3.66	Alzarri Joseph	22	12	6	SRH	Rajiv Gandhi International Cricket Stadium, Hyderabad, India	6 April 2019
Qualification: Minimum 2 wickets. Last Updated: 9 October 2021.

=== Most runs conceded in a match ===
Rank	Figures	Player	Overs	Opposition	Venue	Date
1	1/68	Luke Wood	4	DC	Arun Jaitley Stadium, Delhi, India	27 April 2024
2	0/66	Kwena Maphaka	4	SRH	Rajiv Gandhi International Cricket Stadium, Hyderabad, India	27 March 2024
3	0/58	Lasith Malinga	4	PBKS	Holkar Stadium, Indore, India	20 April 2017
4	2/57	Hardik Pandya	4	PBKS	Wankhede Stadium, Mumbai, India	10 April 2019
4	0/57	Daniel Sams	4	DD	Brabourne Stadium, Mumbai, India	27 March 2022
4	1/57	Gerald Coetzee	4	SRH	Rajiv Gandhi International Cricket Stadium, Hyderabad, India	27 March 2024
4	1/57	Akash Madhwal	4	RCB	Wankhede Stadium, Mumbai, India	11 April 2024
4	2/57	Trent Boult	4	RCB	Wankhede Stadium, Mumbai, India	7 April 2025
Last updated: 7 April 2025

=== Most wickets in a season ===
Rank	Wickets	Player	Matches	Season
1	28	Lasith Malinga	16	2011
2	27	Jasprit Bumrah	15	2020
3	25	Trent Boult	15	2020
4	24	Lasith Malinga	15	2015
4	24	Harbhajan Singh	19	2013
4	24	Mitchell Johnson	17	2013
Last Updated: 13 November 2020

== Individual Records (Wicket-keeping) ==
=== Most career dismissals ===
Rank	Dismissals	Player	Innings	Period
1	50	Quinton de Kock	46	2019–2026
2	49	Ishan Kishan	60	2018–2024
3	28	Parthiv Patel	40	2015–2017
4	25	Ryan Rickelton	25	2025–2026
5	21	Dinesh Karthik	36	2012–2013
Last updated: 24 May 2026

=== Most career catches ===
Rank	Catches	Player	Innings	Period
1	44	Ishan Kishan	60	2018–2024
2	41	Quinton de Kock	46	2019–2026
3	22	Parthiv Patel	40	2015–2017
4	20	Ryan Rickelton	25	2025–2026
5	17	Dinesh Karthik	36	2012–2013
Last updated: 24 May 2026

=== Most career stumpings ===
Rank	Stumpings	Player	Innings	Period
1	9	Quinton de Kock	46	2019–2026
2	6	Parthiv Patel	40	2015–2017
3	5	Aditya Tare	15	2010–2015
3	5	Ryan Rickelton	25	2025–2026
3	5	Ishan Kishan	60	2018–2024
Last updated: 24 May 2026

=== Most dismissals in an innings ===
Rank	Dismissals	Player	Opposition	Venue	Date
1	4	Yogesh Takawale	RR	DY Patil Stadium, Mumbai, India	7 May 2008
1	4	Parthiv Patel	GL	Wankhede Stadium, Mumbai, India	16 April 2016
1	4	Quinton de Kock	CSK	Wankhede Stadium, Mumbai, India	3 April 2019
1	4	Quinton de Kock	CSK	Sharjah Cricket Stadium, Sharjah, UAE	24 October 2020
4	3	12 occasions			
Last Updated: 9 October 2021

=== Most dismissals in a season ===
Rank	Dismissals	Player	Matches	Innings	Season
1	22	Quinton de Kock	16	16	2020
2	19	Quinton de Kock	16	16	2019
3	16	Ryan Rickelton	14	14	2025
4	14	Dinesh Karthik	19	19	2013
5	13	Ishan Kishan	14	14	2022
5	13	Ishan Kishan	16	15	2023
Last Updated: 26 May 2025

== Individual Records (Fielding) ==
=== Most catches as a fielder ===
Rank	Catches	Player	Innings	Period
1	103	Kieron Pollard	189	2010–2022
2	80	Rohit Sharma†	236	2011–2026
3	62	Hardik Pandya†	131	2015–2026
4	52	Suryakumar Yadav†	125	2012–2026
5	44	Tilak Varma†	68	2022–2026
Last Updated: 24 May 2026

=== Most catches in an innings ===
Rank	Dismissals	Player	Opposition	Venue	Date
1	4	Sachin Tendulkar	KKR	Wankhede Stadium, Mumbai, India	16 May 2008
1	4	Tim David	SRH	Rajiv Gandhi International Cricket Stadium, Hyderabad, India	18 April 2023
3	3	Abhishek Nayar	RCB	Wankhede Stadium, Mumbai, India	20 April 2008
3	3	Robin Uthappa	DD	DY Patil Stadium, Navi Mumbai, India	4 May 2008
3	3	Aiden Blizzard	PBKS	Punjab Cricket Association Stadium, Mohali, India	10 May 2011
3	3	Rohit Sharma	DC	Wankhede Stadium, Mumbai, India	29 April 2012
3	3	Rohit Sharma	CSK	M. Chinnaswamy Stadium, Bengaluru, India	23 May 2012
3	3	Ambati Rayudu	RR	Sardar Patel Stadium, Ahmedabad, India	19 May 2014
3	3	Hardik Pandya	CSK	M. A. Chidambaram Stadium, Chennai, India	8 May 2015
3	3	Rohit Sharma	DD	Arun Jaitley Stadium, Delhi, India	6 May 2017
3	3	Hardik Pandya	KKR	Sheikh Zayed Stadium, Abu Dhabi, UAE	23 September 2020
3	3	Suryakumar Yadav	GT	Narendra Modi Stadium, Ahmedabad, India	25 April 2023
3	3	Naman Dhir	KKR	Wankhede Stadium, Mumbai, India	31 March 2025
3	3	Naman Dhir	GT	Narendra Modi Stadium, Ahmedabad, India	20 April 2026
3	3	Tilak Varma	RCB	Shaheed Veer Narayan Singh International Cricket Stadium, Raipur, India	10 May 2026
Last Updated: 10 May 2026

=== Most catches in a season ===
Rank	Catches	Player	Matches	Innings	Season
1	15	Kieron Pollard	17	17	2017
2	13	Rohit Sharma	17	17	2012
3	12	Tilak Varma	14	14	2026
3	12	Naman Dhir	15	15	2025
3	12	Hardik Pandya	17	17	2017
3	12	Kieron Pollard	18	18	2013
Last Updated: 24 May 2026

== Individual Records (Other) ==
=== Most matches ===
Rank	Matches	Player	Period
1	236	Rohit Sharma	2011–2026
2	189	Kieron Pollard	2010–2022
3	158	Jasprit Bumrah	2013–2026
4	136	Harbhajan Singh	2008–2017
5	131	Hardik Pandya	2015–2026
Last Updated: 24 May 2026

=== Most matches as captain ===
Rank	Matches	Player	Won	Lost	Tied	Win%	Period
1	158	Rohit Sharma	87	67	4	55.06	2013–2023
2	51	Sachin Tendulkar	30	21	0	58.82	2008–2011
3	39	Hardik Pandya	15	24	0	38.46	2024–2026
4	20	Harbhajan Singh	10	10	0	50.00	2008–2012
5	6	Ricky Ponting	3	3	0	50.00	2013-2013
5	6	Kieron Pollard	4	2	0	66.66	2019–2021
Last Updated: 24 May 2026

== Partnership Records ==
=== Highest partnerships by wicket ===
Wicket	Runs	First batsman	Second batsman	Opposition	Venue	Date
1st Wicket	163*	Sachin Tendulkar	Dwayne Smith	RR	Sawai Mansingh Stadium, Jaipur, India	20 May 2012
2nd Wicket	167*	Herschelle Gibbs	Rohit Sharma	KKR	Eden Gardens, Kolkata, India	12 May 2012
3rd Wicket	140	Suryakumar Yadav	Nehal Wadhera	RCB	Wankhede Stadium, Mumbai, India	9 May 2023
4th Wicket	143*	Suryakumar Yadav	Tilak Varma	SRH	Wankhede Stadium, Mumbai, India	6 May 2024
5th Wicket	119	Ishan Kishan	Kieron Pollard	RCB	Sheikh Zayed Stadium, Abu Dhabi, UAE	28 September 2020
6th Wicket	122*	Ambati Rayudu	Kieron Pollard	RCB	M. Chinnaswamy Stadium, Bangalore, India	14 May 2012
7th Wicket	100	Jagadeesha Suchith	Harbhajan Singh	PBKS	Wankhede Stadium, Mumbai, India	12 April 2015
8th Wicket	53*	Ryan McLaren	Harbhajan Singh	DC	Wankhede Stadium, Mumbai, India	28 March 2010
9th Wicket	36	Abu Nechim	Harbhajan Singh	CSK	M. A. Chidambaram Stadium, Chennai, India	6 April 2010
10th Wicket	16*	Zaheer Khan	Lasith Malinga	RCB	Brabourne Stadium, Mumbai, India	10 March 2010
Last Updated: 6 May 2024

=== Highest partnerships by runs ===
Wicket	runs	First batsman	Second batsman	Opposition	Venue	Date
2nd Wicket	167*	Herschelle Gibbs	Rohit Sharma	KKR	Eden Gardens, Kolkata, India	12 May 2012
1st Wicket	163*	Sachin Tendulkar	Dwayne Smith	RR	Sawai Mansingh Stadium, Jaipur, India	20 May 2012
1st Wicket	148	Rohit Sharma	Ryan Rickelton	KKR	Wankhede Stadium, Mumbai, India	29 March 2026
4th Wicket	143*	Suryakumar Yadav	Tilak Varma	SRH	Wankhede Stadium, Mumbai, India	25 April 2016
1st Wicket	143	Rohit Sharma	Ryan Rickelton	LSG	Wankhede Stadium, Mumbai, India	4 May 2026
Last Updated: 4 May 2026
