= BCCI Awards =

Annual cricket awards given me

- Country: India
- Presented by: Board of Control for Cricket in India
- First award: 2006-07
- Final award: 2024-25

Highlights
- Most awards: Men's: Virat Kohli (5 Awards); Women's: Smriti Mandhana (5 Awards)

The BCCI Naman Awards are a set of annual cricket awards given by the Board of Control for Cricket in India (BCCI). The awards recognise and honour the best Indian international and domestic cricketers for the past year. The awards were first given in 2006–07. The C. K. Nayudu Lifetime Achievement Award was first presented in 1994. It is the highest honour bestowed by BCCI on a former player and The Polly Umrigar Award for international cricketer of the year awarded to Indian cricketers for outstanding performance in international cricket. Both are considered as one of the most prestigious awards in cricket.

== List of winners ==
The BCCI Award winner is an individual or entity recognized by the Board of Control for Cricket in India for outstanding contributions, performances, or leadership in Indian cricket. Recipients are honored at the annual Naman Awards across categories such as best international player, domestic performer, or lifetime achievement.

== 2006–07 ==
- C. K. Nayudu Award for Lifetime Achievement: Nari Contractor (trophy and ₹1.5 million)
- Polly Umrigar Award for international cricketer of the year: Sachin Tendulkar (trophy and ₹500,000)
- Madhavrao Scindia Award for most runs in Ranji Trophy: Robin Uthappa (trophy and ₹100,000)
- Madhavrao Scindia Award for most wickets in Ranji Trophy: Ranadeb Bose (trophy and ₹100,000)
- Best Cricket Association of the Year for overall performance: Mumbai (trophy)
- M A Chidambaram Trophy for best Under-15 cricketer: Mandeep Singh (trophy and ₹50,000)
- M A Chidambaram Trophy for best Under-17 cricketer: Ajay Rana (trophy and ₹50,000)
- M A Chidambaram Trophy for best Under-19 cricketer: Ajinkya Rahane (trophy and ₹50,000)
- M A Chidambaram Trophy for best Under-22 cricketer: Manoj Tiwary (trophy and ₹50,000)
- M A Chidambaram Trophy for best woman cricketer: Jaya Sharma (trophy and ₹50,000)

Other awards

- Jhulan Goswami was awarded a trophy and a cheque for ₹1 lakh for becoming the ICC Women's Cricketer of the Year 2007.
- Anju Jain and Anjum Chopra were given a trophy each for winning the Arjuna Award in women's cricket for 2006 and 2007 respectively.

Ref:

== 2007–08 ==
- CK Nayudu Award for lifetime achievement: Gundappa Viswanath (trophy and ₹1.5 million)
- Polly Umrigar Award for international cricketer of the year: Virender Sehwag (trophy and ₹500,000)
- Madhavrao Scindia Award for most runs in Ranji Trophy: Cheteshwar Pujara (trophy and ₹100,000)
- Madhavrao Scindia Award for most wickets in Ranji Trophy: Sudeep Tyagi (trophy and ₹ 100,000)
- Best Cricket Association of the Year for overall performance: Maharashtra (trophy)
- M A Chidambaram Trophy for best Under-15 cricketer: Ankit Bawne (trophy and ₹50,000)
- M A Chidambaram Trophy for best Under-17 cricketer: Mandeep Singh (trophy and ₹50,000)
- M A Chidambaram Trophy for best Under-19 cricketer: Bhuvneshwar Kumar (trophy and ₹50,000)
- M A Chidambaram Trophy for best Under-22 cricketer: Rahul Dewan (trophy and ₹50,000)
- M A Chidambaram Trophy for best woman cricketer: Mithali Raj (trophy and ₹50,000)

Other awards

- Mahendra Singh Dhoni was handed a special award for winning the Rajiv Gandhi Khel Ratna and the Padma Shri.
- Harbhajan Singh was handed a special award for taking 300 Test wickets and winning the Padma Shri.

Ref:

== 2008–09 ==
- CK Nayudu Award for lifetime achievement: Mohinder Amarnath (trophy and ₹1.5 million)
- Polly Umrigar Award for international cricketer of the year: Gautam Gambhir (trophy and ₹500,000)
- Madhavrao Scindia Award for most runs in Ranji Trophy: Wasim Jaffer (trophy and ₹100,000)
- Madhavrao Scindia Award for most wickets in Ranji Trophy: Dhawal Kulkarni & Ravindra Jadeja (trophy and ₹100,000)
- Best Cricket Association of the Year for overall performance: Mumbai & Punjab (trophy)
- M A Chidambaram Trophy for best Under-16 cricketer: Chirag Khurana (trophy and ₹50,000)
- M A Chidambaram Trophy for best Under-19 cricketer: Harpreet Singh (trophy and ₹50,000)
- M A Chidambaram Trophy for best Under-22 cricketer: Neelkanth Das (trophy and ₹50,000)
- M A Chidambaram Trophy for best woman cricketer: Reema Malhotra (trophy and ₹50,000)
- M A Chidambaram Trophy for best woman junior cricketer: Poonam Raut (trophy and ₹50,000)
- Best umpire: Amish Saheba (trophy and ₹50,000)

Other awards

- Rahul Dravid was handed a special award for taking the most catches.
- Sachin Tendulkar was handed a special award for completing two decades of international cricket.

Ref:

== 2009–10 ==
- CK Nayudu Award for lifetime achievement: Salim Durani (trophy and ₹1.5 million)
- Polly Umrigar Award for international cricketer of the year: Sachin Tendulkar (trophy and ₹500,000)
- Madhavrao Scindia Award for most runs in Ranji Trophy: Manish Pandey (trophy and ₹100,000)
- Madhavrao Scindia Award for most wickets in Ranji Trophy: Abhimanyu Mithun (trophy and ₹100,000)
- Best Cricket Association of the Year for overall performance: Maharashtra (trophy)
- M A Chidambaram Trophy for best Under-16 cricketer: Baba Aparajith (trophy and ₹50,000)
- M A Chidambaram Trophy for best Under-19 cricketer: Bhargav Merai (trophy and ₹50,000)
- M A Chidambaram Trophy for best Under-22 cricketer: Natraj Behera (trophy and ₹50,000)
- M A Chidambaram Trophy for best woman cricketer: Thirush Kamini (trophy and ₹50,000)
- M A Chidambaram Trophy for best woman junior cricketer: Reva Arora (trophy and ₹50,000)
- Best umpire: K. Hariharan (trophy and Rs 50,000)

Ref:

== 2010–11 ==
- CK Nayudu Award for lifetime achievement: Ajit Wadekar (trophy and ₹1.5 million)
- Polly Umrigar Award for international cricketer of the year: Rahul Dravid (trophy and ₹500,000)
- Madhavrao Scindia Award for most runs in Ranji Trophy: Subramaniam Badrinath (trophy and ₹100,000)
- Madhavrao Scindia Award for most wickets in Ranji Trophy: Bhargav Bhatt (trophy and ₹100,000)
- Best Cricket Association of the Year for overall performance: Railways & Delhi (trophy)
- M A Chidambaram Trophy for best Under-16 cricketer: Vijay Zol (trophy and ₹50,000)
- M A Chidambaram Trophy for best Under-19 cricketer: Avi Barot (trophy and ₹50,000)
- M A Chidambaram Trophy for best Under-22 cricketer: Suryakumar Yadav (trophy and ₹50,000)
- M A Chidambaram Trophy for best woman cricketer: Jhulan Goswami (trophy and ₹50,000)
- M A Chidambaram Trophy for best woman junior cricketer: Mona Meshram (trophy and ₹50,000)
- Best umpire: S. Ravi (trophy and ₹50,000)
- Lala Amarnath Award for best all-rounder in Ranji Trophy: Iqbal Abdulla (trophy and ₹100,000)
- Lala Amarnath Award for best all-rounder in limited-overs tournaments: Sumit Narwal (trophy and ₹100,000)

Other awards

- Dilip Sardesai Award for India's best cricketer in the 2011 Test series in the West Indies: Ishant Sharma
- Dilip Sardesai Award for India's best cricketer in the 2011 Test series against the West Indies: Ravichandran Ashwin

Ref:

== 2011–12 ==
- CK Nayudu Award for lifetime achievement: Sunil Gavaskar (trophy and ₹ 1.5 million)
- Polly Umrigar Award for international cricketer of the year: Virat Kohli (trophy and ₹500,000)
- Madhavrao Scindia Award for most runs in Ranji Trophy: Robin Bist (trophy and ₹100,000)
- Madhavrao Scindia Award for most wickets in Ranji Trophy: Ashok Dinda (trophy and ₹100,000)
- Best Cricket Association of the Year for overall performance: Delhi (trophy)
- M A Chidambaram Trophy for best Under-16 cricketer: Mohammad Saif (trophy and ₹50,000)
- M A Chidambaram Trophy for best Under-19 cricketer: Vijay Zol (trophy and ₹50,000)
- M A Chidambaram Trophy for best Under-22 cricketer: Satyam Choudhary (trophy and ₹50,000)
- M A Chidambaram Trophy for best woman cricketer: Anagha Deshpande (trophy and ₹50,000)
- Best umpire: S. Ravi (trophy and ₹50,000)
- Lala Amarnath Award for best all-rounder in Ranji Trophy: Stuart Binny (trophy and ₹100,000)
- Lala Amarnath Award for best all-rounder in limited-overs tournaments: Laxmi Ratan Shukla (trophy and ₹100,000)

Other awards

- VVS Laxman was handed a special award for his achievements in international cricket.

Ref:

== 2012–13 ==
- CK Nayudu Award for lifetime achievement: Kapil Dev (trophy and ₹ 2.5 million)
- Polly Umrigar Award for international cricketer of the year: Ravichandran Ashwin (trophy and ₹ 500,000)
- Madhavrao Scindia Award for most runs in Ranji Trophy: Jiwanjot Singh (trophy and ₹250,000)
- Madhavrao Scindia Award for most wickets in Ranji Trophy: Ishwar Pandey (trophy and ₹250,000)
- Best Cricket Association of the Year for overall performance: Mumbai (trophy)
- M A Chidambaram Trophy for best Under-16 cricketer: Arman Jaffer (trophy and ₹50,000)
- M A Chidambaram Trophy for best Under-19 cricketer: Akshar Patel (trophy and ₹50,000)
- M A Chidambaram Trophy for best Under-25 cricketer: Karn Sharma (trophy and ₹50,000)
- M A Chidambaram Trophy for best woman cricketer: Thirush Kamini (trophy and ₹50,000)
- Best umpire: Chettithody Shamshuddin (trophy and ₹50,000)
- Lala Amarnath Award for best all-rounder in Ranji Trophy: Abhishek Nayar (trophy and ₹250,000)
- Lala Amarnath Award for best all-rounder in limited-overs tournaments: Laxmi Ratan Shukla (trophy and ₹250,000)

Other awards

- Bapu Nadkarni, Farokh Engineer, late Eknath Solkar were handed special awards for outstanding contribution to Indian cricket (trophy and ₹1.5 million)
- Dilip Sardesai Award for India's best cricketer in the 2013 Test series against the West Indies: Rohit Sharma (trophy and ₹500,000)

Ref:

== 2013–14 ==
- CK Nayudu Award for lifetime achievement: Dilip Vengsarkar (trophy and ₹2.5 million)
- Polly Umrigar Award for international cricketer of the year: Bhuvneshwar Kumar (trophy and ₹500,000)
- Madhavrao Scindia Award for most runs in Ranji Trophy: Kedar Jadhav (trophy and ₹250,000)
- Madhavrao Scindia Award for most wickets in Ranji Trophy: Rishi Dhawan (trophy and ₹250,000)
- Best Cricket Association of the Year for overall performance: Maharashtra & Railways (trophy)
- M A Chidambaram Trophy for best Under-16 cricketer: Shubman Gill (trophy and ₹50,000)
- M A Chidambaram Trophy for best Under-19 cricketer: Balchander Anirudh (trophy and ₹50,000)
- M A Chidambaram Trophy for best Under-25 cricketer: Rahul Tripathi (trophy and ₹50,000)
- M A Chidambaram Trophy for best woman cricketer: Thirush Kamini (trophy and ₹50,000)
- Best umpire: Anil Chaudhary (trophy and 50,000)
- Lala Amarnath Award for best all-rounder in Ranji Trophy: Parvez Rasool (trophy and ₹250,000)
- Lala Amarnath Award for best all-rounder in limited-overs tournaments: Vinay Kumar (trophy and ₹250,000)

Other awards

- Rohit Sharma was handed a special award for scoring the highest ODI individual score of 264.

Ref:

== 2014–15 ==
- CK Nayudu Award for lifetime achievement: Syed Kirmani (trophy and ₹ 2.5 million)
- Polly Umrigar Award for international cricketer of the year: Virat Kohli (trophy and ₹500,000)
- Madhavrao Scindia Award for most runs in Ranji Trophy: Robin Uthappa (trophy and ₹250,000)
- Madhavrao Scindia Award for most wickets in Ranji Trophy: Vinay Kumar & Shardul Thakur (trophy and ₹250,000)
- Best Cricket Association of the Year for overall performance: Karnataka (trophy)
- M A Chidambaram Trophy for best Under-16 cricketer: Shubman Gill (trophy and ₹50,000)
- M A Chidambaram Trophy for best Under-19 cricketer: Anmolpreet Singh (trophy and ₹50,000)
- M A Chidambaram Trophy for best Under-23 cricketer: Almas Shaukat (trophy and ₹50,000)
- M A Chidambaram Trophy for best woman cricketer: Mithali Raj (trophy and ₹50,000)
- M A Chidambaram Trophy for best woman junior cricketer: Devika Vaidya (trophy and ₹ 50,000)
- Best umpire: O. Nandan (trophy and ₹50,000)
- Lala Amarnath Award for best all-rounder in Ranji Trophy: Jalaj Saxena (trophy and ₹250,000)
- Lala Amarnath Award for best all-rounder in limited-overs tournaments: Deepak Hooda (trophy and ₹250,000)

Ref:

== 2015–16 ==
- CK Nayudu Award for lifetime achievement: Rajinder Goel and Padmakar Shivalkar
- Polly Umrigar Award for international cricketer of the year: Virat Kohli
- BCCI Lifetime Achievement Award For Women: Shanta Rangaswamy
- Madhavrao Scindia Award for most runs in Ranji Trophy: Shreyas Iyer
- Madhavrao Scindia Award for most wickets in Ranji Trophy: Shahbaz Nadeem
- Lala Amarnath Award for best all-rounder in Ranji Trophy: Jalaj Saxena
- Lala Amarnath Award for best all-rounder in limited-overs tournaments: Axar Patel
- Best Cricket Association of the Year for overall performance: Mumbai
- M A Chidambaram Trophy for highest scorer in Under-23 CK Nayudu Trophy: Jay Bista
- M A Chidambaram Trophy for highest wicket-taker in Under-23 CK Nayudu Trophy: Satyajeet Bachhav
- N K P Salve Award for highest scorer in Under-19 Cooch Behar Trophy: Armaan Jaffer
- N K P Salve Award for highest wicket-taker in Under-19 Cooch Behar Trophy: Ninad Rathva
- Raj Singh Dungarpur Award for highest scorer in Under-16 Vijay Merchant Trophy: Abhishek Sharma
- Raj Singh Dungarpur Award for highest wicket-taker in Under-16 Vijay Merchant Trophy: Abhishek Sharma
- Jagmohan Dalmiya Award for best woman cricketer: Mithali Raj
- Jagmohan Dalmiya Award for best woman junior cricketer: Deepti Sharma
- Best umpire: Nitin Menon

Other awards

- Dilip Sardesai Award for India's best cricketer in the 2016 Test series in the West Indies: Ravichandran Ashwin
- Vaman Kumar and late Ramakant Desai were handed special awards for outstanding contribution to Indian cricket

Ref:

== 2016–17 ==
- CK Nayudu Award for lifetime achievement: Pankaj Roy
- Polly Umrigar Award for international cricketer of the year: Virat Kohli
- Best international woman cricketer: Harmanpreet Kaur
- BCCI Lifetime Achievement Award For Women: Diana Edulji
- Madhavrao Scindia Award for most runs in Ranji Trophy: Priyank Panchal
- Madhavrao Scindia Award for most wickets in Ranji Trophy: Shahbaz Nadeem
- Lala Amarnath Award for best all-rounder in Ranji Trophy: Parvez Rasool
- Lala Amarnath Award for best all-rounder in limited-overs tournaments: Krunal Pandya
- Best Cricket Association of the Year for overall performance: Mumbai
- M A Chidambaram Trophy for highest scorer in Under-23 CK Nayudu Trophy: Ekant Sen
- M A Chidambaram Trophy for highest wicket-taker in Under-23 CK Nayudu Trophy: Karan Kaila
- N K P Salve Award for highest scorer in Under-19 Cooch Behar Trophy: Jonty Sidhu
- M A Chidambaram Trophy for highest wicket-taker in Under-19 Cooch Behar Trophy: Rahul Singh (Assam cricketer)
- Raj Singh Dungarpur Award for highest scorer in Under-16 Vijay Merchant Trophy: N Thakur Tilak
- Raj Singh Dungarpur Award for highest wicket-taker in Under-16 Vijay Merchant Trophy: Rohit Dattatraya
- Jagmohan Dalmiya Award for best woman cricketer (Sr Domestic): Punam Raut
- Jagmohan Dalmiya Award for best woman junior cricketer: Jemimah Rodrigues
- Best umpire: Anil Dandekar

== 2017–18 ==
- CK Nayudu Award for lifetime achievement: Anshuman Gaekwad
- Polly Umrigar Award for international cricketer of the year: Virat Kohli
- Best international woman cricketer: Smriti Mandhana
- BCCI Lifetime Achievement Award For Women: Sudha Shah
- Madhavrao Scindia Award for most runs in Ranji Trophy: Mayank Agarwal
- Madhavrao Scindia Award for most wickets in Ranji Trophy: Jalaj Saxena
- Lala Amarnath Award for best all-rounder in Ranji Trophy: Jalaj Saxena
- Lala Amarnath Award for best all-rounder in limited-overs tournaments: Diwesh Pathania
- BCCI special award : Budhi Kunderan
- M.A. Chidambaram Trophy for highest run-scorer in C. K. Nayudu Trophy: Aryaman Birla
- M.A. Chidambaram Trophy for highest wicket-taker in C. K. Nayudu Trophy: Tejas Baroka
- M.A. Chidambaram Trophy for highest run-scorer in Cooch Behar Trophy: Yash Rathod
- M.A. Chidambaram Trophy for highest wicket-taker in Cooch Behar Trophy: Ayush Jamwal
- Jagmohan Dalmiya Trophy for highest run-scorer in Vijay Merchant Trophy: Nithish Kumar
- Jagmohan Dalmiya Trophy for highest wicket-taker in Vijay Merchant Trophy: Reshu Raj
- Jagmohan Dalmiya Trophy for best woman cricketer (domestic): Deepti Sharma
- Jagmohan Dalmiya Trophy for best junior women's player (domestic): Jemimah Rodrigues
- Best umpire in domestic cricket: Yeshwant Barde
- Best performances in domestic tournaments: Delhi

Ref:

== 2018–2019 ==
- CK Nayudu Award for lifetime achievement: Kris Srikanth
- Polly Umrigar Award for international cricketer of the year: Jasprit Bumrah
- Best international woman cricketer: Poonam Yadav
- Best umpire in domestic cricket: Virender Sharma
- Best performances in domestic tournaments: Vidarbha

== 2019–2020 ==
- CK Nayudu Award for lifetime achievement: Not Awarded
- Polly Umrigar Award for international cricketer of the year: Mohammed Shami
- Best international woman cricketer: Deepti Sharma

== 2020–2021 ==
- CK Nayudu Award for lifetime achievement: Not Awarded
- Polly Umrigar Award for international cricketer of the year: Ravichandran Ashwin
- Best international woman cricketer: Smriti Mandhana

== 2021–2022 ==
- CK Nayudu Award for lifetime achievement: Not Awarded
- Polly Umrigar Award for international cricketer of the year: Jasprit Bumrah
- Best international woman cricketer: Smriti Mandhana

== 2022–2023 ==
- CK Nayudu Award for lifetime achievement: Farokh Engineer and Ravi Shastri
- Polly Umrigar Award for international cricketer of the year: Shubman Gill
- Best international woman cricketer: Deepti Sharma

== 2023–2024 ==
- CK Nayudu Award for lifetime achievement: Sachin Tendulkar
- Polly Umrigar Award for international cricketer of the year: Jasprit Bumrah
- Best international woman cricketer: Smriti Mandhana

== 2024–2025 ==
- CK Nayudu Award for lifetime achievement: Rahul Dravid, Roger Binny
- BCCI Lifetime achievement award for Women: Mithali Raj
- Polly Umrigar Award for international cricketer of the year: Shubman Gill
- Best international woman cricketer: Smriti Mandhana
