= Sanjana Ganesan =

Indian sports journalist and anchor (born 1991)

Sanjana
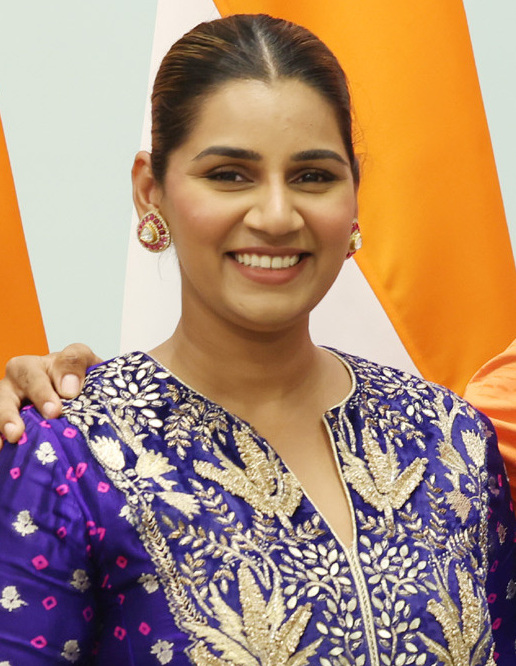
- Ganesan in 2024
- Born: 6 May 1991 (age 35); Mumbai, India
- Spouse: Jasprit Bumrah (m. 2021)
- Children: 1

Sanjana Ganesan (born 6 May 1991) is an Indian sports journalist, anchor, broadcaster of cricket matches, and former model.

== Career ==
Sanjana began her professional career as a model. She is a sports presenter and has been hosting special shows during cricket and badminton tournaments for Star Sports. Sanjana was part of the 2019 World Cup in England, 2020 Women's T20 World Cup and Also 2024 ICC Men's T20 World Cup She has been part of the Star Sports broadcast team during the Indian Premier League for many seasons.

== Early life ==
Ganesan completed her schooling at The Bishop's School. After this, she enrolled herself in B.Tech. from the Symbiosis Institute of Technology, Pune. Sanjana Ganesan is a former Miss India finalist and was a participant in MTV Splitsvilla in 2014.

== Personal life ==
On 15 March 2021, Sanjana married Indian cricketer Jasprit Bumrah in Goa. The two first met during an interview at the 2013 Indian Premier League. They became friends over time, and after dating for two years, they got married in March 2021. Jasprit Bumrah, in an interview, said that he proposed to Sanjana during the initial days of November 2020, and they finally decided to marry on 15 March 2021. On 4 September 2023, Sanjana and Bumrah welcomed their son Angad.
