= Polly Umrigar Award =

Part of the BCCI Indian cricket awards

- Country: India
- Presented by: Board of Control for Cricket in India
- First award: 2006-07
- Final award: 2024-25

Highlights
- Most awards: Men's:Virat Kohli (5 Awards); Women's: Smriti Mandhana (5 Awards)

The Polly Umrigar Award for international cricketer of the year is one of the BCCI Awards, awarded to Indian cricketers for outstanding performance in international cricket.

== History ==
The award was instituted in 2007, with Sachin Tendulkar being the first recipient.

== Award ==
The award includes a trophy, citation, and cash prize of ₹15 lakh.

== List of recipients (Men) ==
Year	Recipient	References
2006-07	Sachin Tendulkar	
2007-08	Virender Sehwag	
2008-09	Gautam Gambhir	
2009-10	Sachin Tendulkar	
2010-11	Rahul Dravid	
2011-12	Virat Kohli	
2012-13	Ravichandran Ashwin	
2013-14	Bhuvneshwar Kumar	
2014-15	Virat Kohli	
2015-16	Virat Kohli	
2016-17	Virat Kohli	
2017-18	Virat Kohli	
2018-19	Jasprit Bumrah	
2019-20	Mohammed Shami	
2020-21	Ravichandran Ashwin	
2021-22	Jasprit Bumrah	
2022-23	Shubman Gill	
2023-24	Jasprit Bumrah	
2024-25	Shubman Gill	

== List of recipients (Women) ==
Year	Recipient	References
2016-17	Harmanpreet Kaur	
2017-18	Smriti Mandhana	
2018-19	Poonam Yadav	
2019-20	Deepti Sharma	
2020-21	Smriti Mandhana	
2021-22	Smriti Mandhana	
2022-23	Deepti Sharma	
2023-24	Smriti Mandhana	
2024-25	Smriti Mandhana	
