= 2012–13 Syed Mushtaq Ali Trophy =

Indian cricket tournament

- Dates: 17 March 2013 – 31 March 2013
- Administrator(s): BCCI
- Cricket format: T20
- Tournament format(s): Round robin, then knockout
- Champions: Gujarat (1st title)
- Runners-up: Punjab
- Participants: 27
- Matches: 81
- Most runs: Unmukt Chand (321) (Delhi)
- Most wickets: Mehul Patel (20) (Gujarat)

The 2012–13 Syed Mushtaq Ali Trophy was the fifth edition of the Syed Mushtaq Ali Trophy, an annual Twenty20 tournament in India. Played from 17 to 31 March 2013, it was contested by all 27 Ranji Trophy teams. Gujarat won the tournament, earning their first title.

== Squads ==
The squads details of all the 27 participating teams is present here

== Group stage ==
=== Central Zone ===
Team	Pld	W	L	T	NR	Pts	NRR
Uttar Pradesh	4	3	1	0	0	12	0.654
Vidarbha	4	2	2	0	0	8	0.332
Rajasthan	4	2	2	0	0	8	-0.319
Madhya Pradesh	4	2	2	0	0	8	-0.356
Railways	4	1	3	0	0	4	-0.291

=== East Zone ===
Team	Pld	W	L	T	NR	Pts	NRR
Orissa	4	3	1	0	0	12	0.968
Bengal	4	3	1	0	0	12	0.959
Assam	4	3	1	0	0	12	0.036
Jharkhand	4	1	3	0	0	4	-0.594
Tripura	4	0	4	0	0	0	-1.448

=== North Zone ===
Team	Pld	W	L	T	NR	Pts	NRR
Delhi	5	4	1	0	0	16	0.330
Punjab	5	3	2	0	0	12	0.704
Haryana	5	3	2	0	0	12	0.410
Services	5	3	2	0	0	12	0.099
Himachal Pradesh	5	2	3	0	0	8	-0.645
Jammu and Kashmir	5	0	5	0	0	0	-0.827

=== West Zone ===
Team	Pld	W	L	T	NR	Pts	NRR
Gujarat	4	4	4	0	0	16	1.928
Baroda	4	2	2	0	0	8	0.891
Saurashtra	4	2	2	0	0	8	-0.277
Maharashtra	4	2	2	0	0	8	-0.517
Mumbai	4	0	4	0	0	0	-1.900

=== South Zone ===
Team	Pld	W	L	T	NR	Pts	NRR
Karnataka	5	4	0	1	0	16	1.353
Kerala	5	4	1	0	0	12	-0.212
Tamil Nadu	5	2	2	1	0	10	0.279
Andhra	5	2	3	0	0	8	-0.325
Goa (Note: Head-to-head points: Goa 4, Hyderabad 0)	5	1	4	0	0	4	-0.810
Hyderabad	5	1	4	0	0	4	-0.246

== Super League Stage ==
=== Group A ===
Team	Pld	W	L	T	NR	Pts	NRR
Gujarat (Note: Head-to-head points: Gujarat 4, Kerala 0)	4	3	1	0	0	12	-0.151
Kerala	4	3	1	0	0	12	-0.779
Vidarbha	4	2	2	0	0	8	0.924
Odisha (Note: Head-to-head points: Odisha 4, Delhi 0)	4	1	3	0	0	4	0.937
Delhi	4	1	3	0	0	4	-0.859

=== Group B ===
Team	Pld	W	L	T	NR	Pts	NRR
Punjab	4	3	1	0	0	12	1.475
Karnataka	4	2	2	0	0	8	-0.008
Bengal	4	2	2	0	0	8	-0.166
Uttar Pradesh	4	2	2	0	0	8	-0.675
Baroda	4	1	3	0	0	4	-0.613

== Final ==
Final
31 March 2013
Scorecard

Punjab; 122/8 (20 overs)	v	Gujarat; 128/4 (17.5 overs)
Amitoze Singh 49 (42); Jasprit Bumrah 3/14 (4 overs)		Asad Pathan 32 (25); Rajwinder Singh 2/40 (3.5 overs)

Gujarat won by 6 wickets
Holkar Cricket Stadium, Indore
Umpires: Ulhas Gandhe and Puttarangaiah Jayapal
Player of the match: Jasprit Bumrah (Gujarat)

- Punjab won the toss and elected to bat.
- Gujarat won their maiden Syed Mushtaq Ali Trophy title.
