= Ashwani Kumar =

Ashwani Kumar may refer to:

- Ashwani Kumar (cricketer) (born 2001), Indian cricketer
- Ashwani Kumar (general) (born 1959), Indian Army general
- Ashwani Kumar (police officer) (1950–2020), Indian police officer and governor of Nagaland
- Ashwani Kumar (politician) (born 1952), Indian Member of Parliament from Punjab
- Ashwani Kumar (Bihar politician) (1928-2012)
- Ashwani Kumar (scientist), Indian bio-technologist
