= Jasprit Bumrah =

Indian cricketer (born 1993)

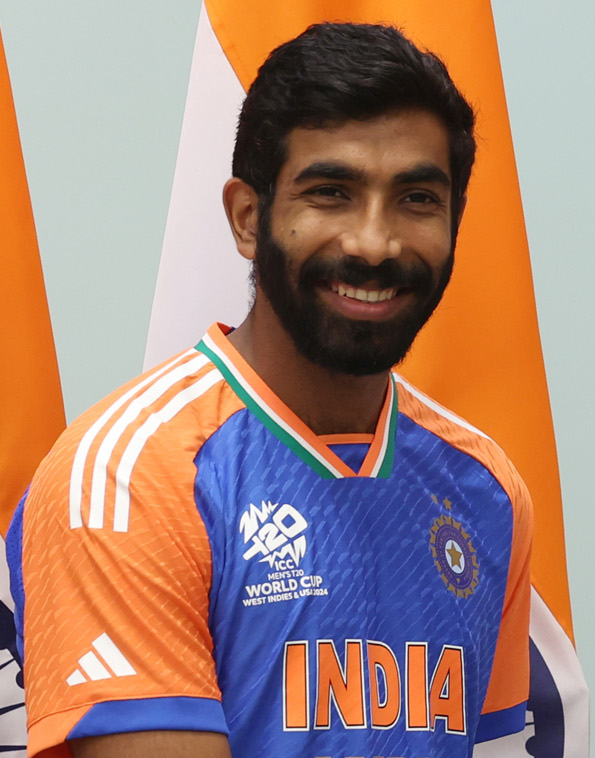
- Bumrah in 2024

Personal information
- Full name: Jasprit Jasbir Singh Bumrah
- Born: 6 December 1993 (age 32); Ahmedabad, Gujarat, India
- Height: 178 cm (5 ft 10 in)
- Batting: Right-handed
- Bowling: Right-arm fast (Note: Some sources list Bumrah as a fast-medium paced bowler.)
- Role: Bowler
- Relatives: Sanjana Ganesan (m. 2021)

International information
- National side: India (2016–present)
- Test debut (cap 290): 5 January 2018 v South Africa
- Last Test: 19 November 2026 v New Zealand
- ODI debut (cap 210): 23 January 2016 v Australia
- Last ODI: 16 July 2026 v England
- ODI shirt no.: 93
- T20I debut (cap 57): 26 January 2016 v Australia
- Last T20I: 3 October 2026 v Pakistan
- T20I shirt no.: 93

Domestic team information
- Years: Team
- 2012–present: Gujarat
- 2013–present: Mumbai Indians

Career statistics
| Competition | Test | ODI | T20I | FC |
|---|---|---|---|---|
| Matches | 52 | 91 | 100 | 80 |
| Runs scored | 348 | 111 | 12 | 528 |
| Batting average | 6.56 | 9.25 | 2.00 | 8.38 |
| 100s/50s | 0/0 | 0/0 | 0/0 | 0/1 |
| Top score | 34* | 20* | 7 | 55* |
| Balls bowled | 10,031 | 4,694 | 2,110 | 15,297 |
| Wickets | 234 | 151 | 126 | 326 |
| Bowling average | 19.79 | 23.74 | 18.21 | 21.45 |
| 5 wickets in innings | 16 | 2 | 0 | 22 |
| 10 wickets in match | 0 | 0 | 0 | 0 |
| Best bowling | 6/27 | 6/19 | 4/15 | 6/27 |
| Catches/stumpings | 17/– | 19/– | 16/– | 26/– |
Medal record
Men's cricket
Representing India
ICC World Test Championship
| Runner-up | 2019–2021 |
ICC Cricket World Cup
| Runner-up | 2023 India |
ICC T20 World Cup
| Winner | 2024 West Indies & USA |
| Winner | 2026 India & Sri Lanka |
ICC Champions Trophy
| Runner-up | 2017 England & Wales |
ACC Asia Cup
| Winner | 2016 Bangladesh |
| Winner | 2018 UAE |
| Winner | 2023 Pakistan |
| Winner | 2025 UAE |
Asian Games
| Gold medal – first place | 2026 Aichi-Nagoya |
ACC Emerging Asia Cup
| Winner | 2013 Singapore |
- Source: Cricinfo, 5 October 2026

Jasprit Jasbir Singh Bumrah (Punjabi: [dʒəsˈpɾiːt̪ bʊmˈɾaː]; born 6 December 1993) is an Indian International cricketer who plays for the Indian national cricket team in all formats of this game and has captained India in Tests and T20Is. Bumrah became the first bowler to reach the No. 1 position in the ICC Men's Player Rankings across all three formats and the first Indian bowler to take 100 wickets in Tests, One Day Internationals, and Twenty20 Internationals. He is widely considered one of the best all-format bowlers in the history of cricket. He represents Gujarat in domestic cricket and the Mumbai Indians in the Indian Premier League (IPL).

Among Indian fast bowlers, he was the fastest to 200 Test wickets and the second fastest to 100 ODI wickets. He was a crucial member of the Indian team that won the 2024 T20 World Cup, where he was named the Player of the Tournament for taking 15 wickets with an average economy of 4.17.

Bumrah made his domestic debut in the 2012–13 Syed Mushtaq Ali Trophy and also helped his team clinch its maiden title victory. His first-class debut came against Vidarbha, during the 2013–14 season of the Ranji Trophy. Bumrah was signed by the Mumbai Indians for the 2013 season of IPL. Since then, he has played for MI, contributing to the team's title wins five times. He is the second highest wicket-taker for MI after Lasith Malinga, with 181 wickets in 142 matches.

Bumrah made his international debut in January 2016 during India's tour of Australia, where he emerged as the highest wicket-taker of the T20 series. In 2016, he was the highest wicket-taker in a calendar year in T20I cricket, with 28 wickets. He made his Test debut in 2018 against South Africa. Since December 2023, he has served as the vice-captain of the Indian team in Test cricket and has also captained the team thrice in the absence of regular skipper Rohit Sharma. He was named in the ICC Men's Test Team of the Year in 2018 and 2024, in the ICC Men's ODI Team of the Year in 2017 and 2018, and in the ICC Men's T20I Team of the Year in 2024. Additionally, he was named in the ICC Men's T20I Team of the Decade for 2011–2020. Bumrah was awarded the Polly Umrigar Award by the BCCI thrice, in 2018–19, 2021–22 and 2023–24. He was also named in the Wisden Cricketers of the Year in 2022.

Notably, Bumrah achieved a milestone in 2024 by surpassing Ravichandran Ashwin's highest ICC Test bowling rating for an Indian bowler. Bumrah concluded the year as the leading wicket-taker in Test cricket, with 71 wickets, and reached a career-high rating of 908 points, placing him joint-16th on the all-time list. His performances, including a nine-wicket haul in the Melbourne Test in December 2024, secured his position as the top-ranked bowler in the ICC Men's Test Rankings, and led to him being awarded the Sir Garfield Sobers Trophy and the ICC Men's Test Cricketer of the Year in the 2024 ICC Awards.

== Early life ==
Bumrah was born on 6 December 1993 into a Punjabi Ramgarhia Sikh family in Ahmedabad, Gujarat. His father, Jasbir Singh, ran a chemical business, while his mother, Daljeet Bumrah, worked as a school teacher. His father died due to hepatitis B when Bumrah was 5 years old. His mother raised him and his sister Juhika in a middle-class environment in Ahmedabad. Bumrah attended Nirman High School in Vastrapur, Ahmedabad, where his mother worked as the vice principal. He also played cricket for Nirman's team.

== Youth and domestic career ==
In 2010, Bumrah appeared at the Gujarat Cricket Association's Under-19 district selection trials. The selectors did not include him in the main squad of 15 due to his unconventional bowling action but named him as a reserve. After the district team won the first three matches, all three reserve players were given a chance in the fourth three-day match. Bumrah took seven wickets in that match.

Bumrah made his Twenty20 (T20) debut for Gujarat against Maharashtra in the 2012–13 Syed Mushtaq Ali Trophy, and helped his team clinch the title with his Man of the Match performance in the final, with figures of 3/14 to beat Punjab. On 18 March 2013, during the match against Mumbai, former India coach John Wright, who was then the head coach of Mumbai Indians (MI) and scouting for the team at the time, was impressed by Bumrah's performance and invited him to sign up for MI.

Bumrah played first-class cricket for Gujarat and made his debut against Vidarbha in October 2013 during the 2013–14 season, where he took seven wickets for 89 runs. During the 2015–16 Vijay Hazare Trophy, after the first two matches, the umpires called him for throwing and raised objections about his bowling action. The issue was resolved when the team management protested against it. Gujarat won the trophy, with Bumrah taking a five-wicket haul in the final against Delhi. On 11 December 2020, he scored his maiden first-class half century (55 not out) against Australia A during the India tour of Australia.

== International career ==
Jasprit Bumrah has the best and the most effective yorker among fast bowlers playing international cricket now.

— Cricket commentator and former fast bowler Wasim Akram, January 2019

=== 2016–2017: International debut ===
Bumrah made his ODI debut in January 2016 against Australia in the last match of the ODI series, where he took his first international wicket – that of Steve Smith – and finished with figures of 2/40. In the first match of the T20I series that followed Bumrah made his debut, taking his maiden T20I wicket – that of David Warner – and finished with figures of 3/23. India won the T20I series and Bumrah was the highest wicket-taker on either team with six wickets. In February 2016, he took three wickets in the T20I series against Sri Lanka.

Bumrah was named in India's 15-man squad for the 2016 ICC World Twenty20. He took a wicket in every single match of the tournament except against Bangladesh. In the semi-final against West Indies he took the wicket of Chris Gayle while conceding 42 runs, having an economy rate of 10.50 runs per over. India lost the match, and Bumrah finished the tournament with four wickets at an average of 38.25 and an economy rate of 7.65.

In India's tour of Zimbabwe in 2016, during the first match of the ODI series, Bumrah, who was playing his second ODI game, took 4 wickets for 28 runs. He was the highest wicket-taker of the series with 9 wickets, including another four-wicket haul in the third match. During the T20I series, he was the second highest wicket-taker with five wickets, including a three-wicket haul in the second match. In the two-match T20I series against West Indies in August 2016, Bumrah took his 28th wicket of the year, breaking Dirk Nannes's record for most wickets in Twenty20 Internationals in a calendar year. In October 2016, when New Zealand toured India, Bumrah took six wickets in the ODI series at an average of 22.00.

In January 2017, in the second match of the T20I series during England's 2016–17 tour of India, Bumrah picked up two wickets, conceded 20 runs, and was awarded the Player of the Match. He emerged as the second leading wicket-taker of the series, with five wickets in a 2–1 victory. In the 2017 ICC Champions Trophy, he went wicketless in the first two matches of the tournament. India lost the final against Pakistan, and Bumrah finished the tournament as the second leading wicket-taker for India, after Bhuvneshwar Kumar. During the 2017 Sri Lanka tour, Bumrah recorded the most wickets (15) taken by any fast bowler in a bilateral ODI series of five or fewer matches. In February 2018, he became the highest-ranked bowler in the ICC Men's ODI player rankings, along with Afghan leg-spinner Rashid Khan.

=== 2018–2019: Test debut and World Cup ===
In November 2017, Bumrah was named in India's Test squad for their series against South Africa. He made his Test debut for India against South Africa at Newlands in Cape Town on 5 January 2018 and took the wicket of AB de Villiers as his first test wicket. In the third match of the series, at Johannesburg, Bumrah took his maiden five-wicket haul in Tests, with the figures of 5/54 from 18.5 overs. South Africa won the series 2–1. Bumrah was the second highest wicket-taker for India behind teammate Mohammed Shami.

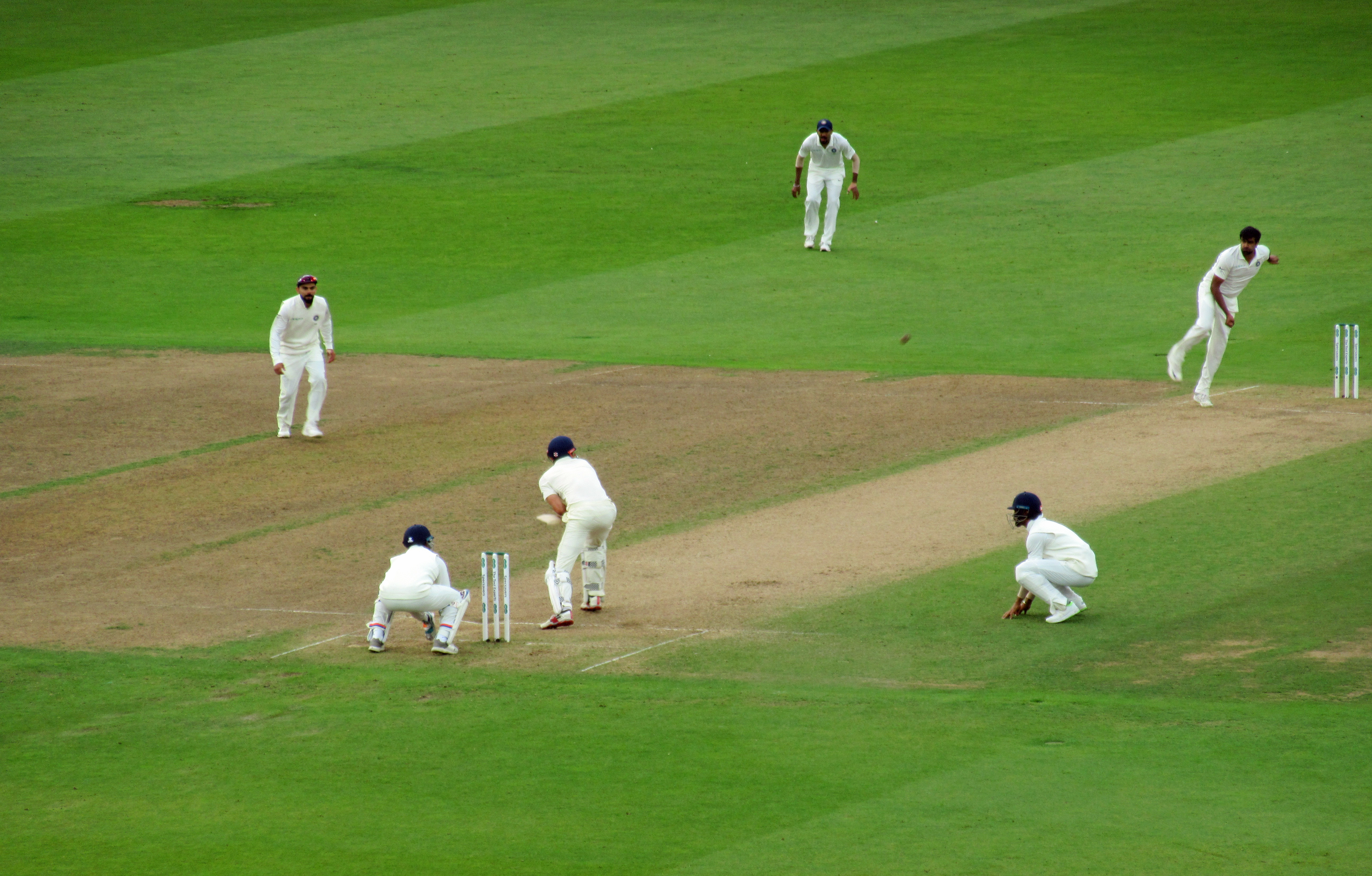
Jasprit Bumrah (fourth from left) fielding during India vs England, at Trent Bridge (August 2018)

In June 2018, in the first match of India's tour of Ireland, Bumrah fractured his left thumb while attempting a catch; the injury caused him to miss the remainder of the tour and the first two Test matches of the 2018 Pataudi Trophy. He returned for the third Test match at Trent Bridge, where he took his second five-wicket haul and finished with figures of 5/85 from 29 overs. He was the fifth leading wicket-taker of the series with 14 wickets from three matches, in a series where India faced a 4–1 defeat.

During the Boxing Day Test of India Tour of Australia 2018, with career-best figures of 6/33, Bumrah became the first Asian bowler to take five-wicket hauls in Australia, England, and South Africa in the same calendar year. India won the series 2–1 and Bumrah finished as the joint highest wicket-taker with 21 wickets, alongside Australian bowler Nathan Lyon. He concluded the year with 48 wickets, setting a record for an Indian bowler in his debut year in Test cricket. For his performances in 2018, he was named in both the World Test XI and ODI XI by the ICC.

In April 2019, Bumrah was named in India's squad for the 2019 Cricket World Cup. On 6 July 2019, in the match against Sri Lanka, Bumrah, in his 57th career match, took his 100th wicket in ODIs and became the second-fastest Indian to do so after his teammate, Mohammed Shami. He finished the tournament as the leading wicket-taker for India and the fifth highest overall, with 18 dismissals in 9 matches at an average of 20.61 and economy rate of 4.41. India lost to New Zealand in semi-final. Bumrah was named in the 'Team of the Tournament' by the ICC and Cricinfo.

In August 2019, Bumrah took his fourth Test five-wicket haul against West Indies in the first Test match of India tour of West Indies 2019, at the Sir Vivian Richards Stadium, with figures of 5/7 in the second innings. In the next Test match, he became the third Indian to take a hat-trick in a Test match. India whitewashed West Indies 2–0, with Bumrah finishing as the highest wicket-taker of the series with 13 wickets. In September 2019, Bumrah was ruled out of South Africa's tour of India due to a stress fracture of the lower back.

=== 2020–2022: Test in India and T20 World Cup ===
In December 2020, Bumrah was named in the ICC Men's T20I Team of the Decade for 2011–2020. In January 2021, He was ruled out of the final Test match at the Gabba of the 2020 Border-Gavaskar Trophy, due to an abdominal strain, which he picked up during the third Test of the series in Sydney. At Sydney, Bumrah faced racist abuse from the crowd, prompting India to file a formal complaint at the end of day three. Subsequently, Cricket Australia issued an apology to the Indian team. India won the final test, securing victory in the Border-Gavaskar Trophy. Bumrah was the fifth highest wicket-taker of the series with 11 wickets. He played his maiden Test match in India in the M. A. Chidambaram Stadium against England in February 2021 after playing 17 Tests overseas. His maiden Test wicket in India was of Daniel Lawrence in England Tour of India 2021. Bumrah was part of the Indian team that played the 2021 ICC World Test Championship Final against New Zealand. He went wicketless in the match, which India lost by 8 wickets.

In the 2021 India tour of England, Bumrah was the highest wicket-taker of the series with 23 wickets. He was the player of the series along with England's Joe Root. In the last match of the series, which was postponed to July 2022 due to COVID-19 cases in the Indian camp, Bumrah captained the Indian Test team for the first time instead of Rohit Sharma, who was ruled out due to suffering from COVID-19. He scored 29 runs in an over bowled by Stuart Broad, beating the 18-year-old Test record set by Brian Lara (who had scored 28 runs in an over). The over also included six extras, meaning it cost a total of 35 runs. In September 2021, Bumrah was named in India's squad for the 2021 ICC Men's T20 World Cup. He was one of only four fast bowlers in the main squad, alongside Mohammed Shami, the white-ball specialist, Bhuvneshwar Kumar, and the bowling all-rounder Shardul Thakur. India was knocked out of the tournament without reaching the semi-finals.

In February 2022, Bumrah was named vice-captain of India for the T20I and Test series against Sri Lanka as the regular vice-captain, KL Rahul, was unavailable. He took his maiden Test five-wicket haul in India during the second match of the series. In April 2022, Bumrah was among the Wisden Five Cricketers of the Year. During the 2022 India tour of England, in the first match of the ODI series, he took 6 wicket for 19 runs, India's best figures against England, and the third best figures for India in ODIs. In July 2022, Bumrah regained the number one spot in the ICC Men's ODI player rankings, overtaking New Zealand's Trent Boult. Bumrah missed the 2022 Asia Cup in August due to a back injury; he also missed the 2022 T20 World Cup in October. He featured in two of the three T20Is against Australia but was pulled out on the eve of the South Africa series, India's last before the 2022 T20 World Cup, after he complained of back pain.

=== 2023: Injury and 2023 Cricket World Cup ===
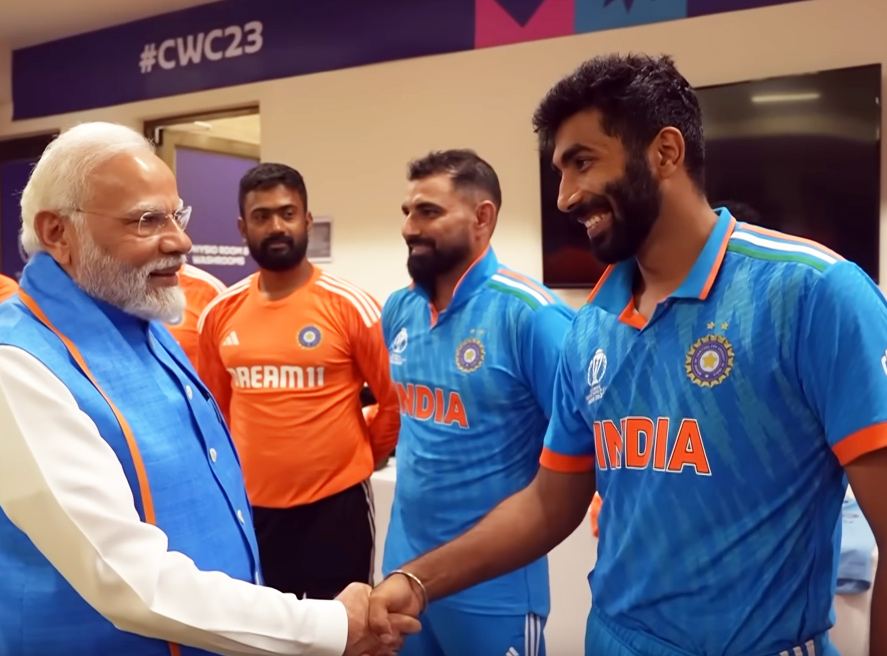
Bumrah with Indian Prime Minister Narendra Modi following the World Cup final.

In January 2023, Bumrah missed the home series against Sri Lanka due to his back injury. He underwent back surgery in March 2023. He also missed the 2023 ICC World Test Championship final against Australia in June 2023. In August 2023, after nearly a year, Bumrah made his comeback to international cricket as India's captain in the series against Ireland. Bumrah was the player of the series, which India won 2–0.

On 21 August 2023, Bumrah was named in India's squad for the 2023 Asia Cup. He played his first match in the tournament against Pakistan, scoring 16 runs off 14 balls, but the match was abandoned due to rain. He was replaced by Mohammed Shami for the match against Nepal because he flew back to Mumbai for personal reasons. India won the tournament by beating Sri Lanka in the final. Bumrah played four matches and took four wickets, averaging 17.75 with an economy rate of 4.17 runs per over.

In September 2023, Bumrah was named in India's 15-man squad for 2023 Cricket World Cup. In the match against Afghanistan at Delhi, he took a four-wicket haul at an economy rate of 3.90. In the final, against Australia at Ahmedabad, he took 2 wickets for 43 runs at an economy rate of 4.77. India lost the final, and Bumrah finished as the fourth leading wicket-taker of the tournament with 20 wickets at an average of 18.65 and economy rate of 4.06. He was the most economical bowler in the World Cup among those who took 10 wickets or more, with the next most economical being Keshav Maharaj, taking 15 wickets at an economy rate of 4.15.

=== 2024: 2024 T20 World Cup, Border Gavaskar Trophy ===
On 3 February 2024, during England's tour of India, in the second match of the series, Bumrah became the joint third-fastest (34 matches) Indian bowler and the fastest Indian pacer to take 150 wickets in Test cricket. He took 6 wickets for 45 runs, his third-best bowling figure in Tests, and was awarded the Player of the Match award. He became the first Indian fast bowler to reach the number one ranking in the ICC Test player rankings and the first bowler to achieve the number one ranking in all three formats of the game. He took 19 wickets in four matches and emerged as the third-highest wicket-taker of the series, behind Ravichandran Ashwin of India and Tom Hartley of England.

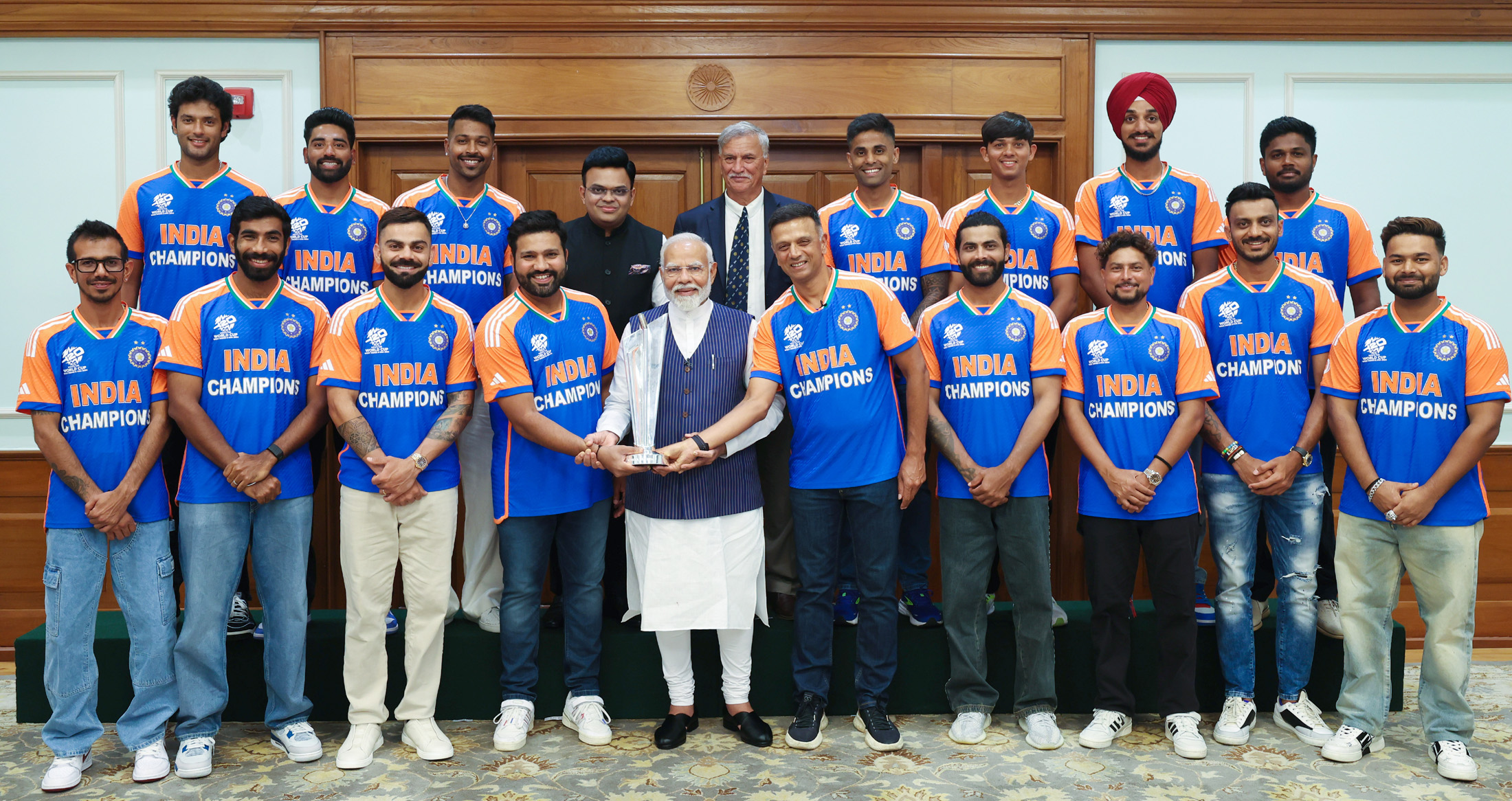
Jasprit Bumrah (second from left, front row) with the 2024 T20 World Cup winning team and Indian Prime Minister Narendra Modi.

In June 2024, Bumrah was part of India's squad for the 2024 ICC Men's T20 World Cup. He finished the tournament with 15 wickets at an economy rate of 4.17 runs per over, making him the second-highest wicket-taker for the team. In the tournament, he maintained an economy rate of 4.17 across eight matches, the best among bowlers with at least ten wickets. The next most economical was Anrich Nortje, who took 15 wickets at an economy rate of 5.74, with no other bowler in that group recording an economy below six.Bumrah also helped India win the India vs Pakistan match while defending a low score of 120 runs while taking 3 wickets and giving only 14 runs with the economy of 3.5 runs, his performance led to him getting the man of the match. Bumrah was named the player of the tournament following India's win in the final against South Africa. In the final vs South Africa, Bumrah helped deliver a near miraculous win for India; with South Africa needing only 30 runs from 30 balls and 6 wickets in hand, he gave away only 6 runs in 2 overs and took the wicket of Marco Jansen.

In September 2024, Bumrah achieved the milestone of 400 international wickets during the first Test match between India and Bangladesh. With this accomplishment, he became the sixth Indian fast bowler to reach this significant mark. In December 2024, Bumrah became the number 1 bowler in the ICC player rankings with 904 points, equalling the career-best rating of Ravichandran Ashwin.

In the Border–Gavaskar Trophy, Bumrah became the fastest Indian fast bowler to reach 200 Test wickets in his 44th match, with the best bowling average among bowlers to have taken 200 wickets. His 32 wickets in the series are the most taken by an Indian bowler in an overseas Test series. Among visiting bowlers to Australia, Bumrah's 32 wickets arethe joint fourth most, with England's Maurice Tate leading with 38 wickets in the Ashes series of 1924–25. He broke Bishen Singh Bedi's record of 31 wickets set in 1977–78.

2026: 2026 ICC Men's T20 World Cup

Bumrah was named player of the match in the 2026 ICC Men's T20 World Cup final as India defeated New Zealand by 96 runs at the Narendra Modi Stadium, Ahmedabad, helping India become the first team to win three T20 World Cup Titles.

On 19 November 2026, during the first Test against New Zealand at the Basin Reserve in Wellington, Bumrah took 3 wickets for 52 runs in 17 overs. His wickets included Tom Latham, Daryl Mitchell and Tom Blundell.

== Franchise career ==
Representing MI

Indian Premier League
| Winner | 2013 | |
| Winner | 2015 | |
| Winner | 2017 | |
| Winner | 2019 | |
| Winner | 2020 | |

During the 2013–14 season of the Syed Mushtaq Ali Trophy, John Wright, who was then the head coach of the Indian Premier League (IPL) franchise Mumbai Indians (MI) and scouting for the team at the time, was impressed by Bumrah's performance and invited him to sign up for the franchise. Bumrah has played for the Mumbai Indians since 2013 IPL and helped the team win the title five times in 2013, 2015, 2017, 2019, and 2020. He has taken 170 wickets in 138 matches in the IPL, with an average of 22.78 and an economy rate of 7.32, making him the joint highest wicket-taker for the team with Lasith Malinga. He has two five and four-wicket hauls in the league.

Bumrah made his IPL debut at the age of 19, where he concluded with figures of 3/32 against Royal Challengers Bangalore (RCB). Despite Virat Kohli hitting him for three fours in his first four deliveries of the IPL, Bumrah managed to dismiss him on the fifth ball, with Kohli scoring 24 runs and Bumrah securing his maiden IPL wicket. He was then benched for the remainder of the season and only played in the match against the Delhi Daredevils, where he did not take a wicket. Despite only playing two matches in the 2013 season, the Mumbai Indians retained him for the 2014 season. He went wicketless in his first two matches of the 2014 season. However, in the match against RCB, he took two wickets for 22 runs at an economy rate of 5.50, including the wicket of AB de Villiers. It was his best bowling figures of the season. He played in 11 of Mumbai's 15 matches and finished as the team's fifth leading wicket-taker of the season, securing five wickets at an economy rate of 7.58 and an average of 60.20. MI retained Bumrah once again ahead of the 2015 Indian Premier League. Bumrah played in only four of MI's sixteen matches and took three wickets at an economy rate of 12.26.

In the 2016 Indian Premier League, Bumrah took four 3-wicket hauls and was the team's second-leading wicket-taker, after Mitchell McClenaghan, with fifteen wickets. His best figures came in the match against Delhi Daredevils at Visakhapatnam, where he took three wickets for thirteen runs, with an economy rate of 3.25 runs per over. In the 2017 season, he became the leading wicket-taker for the team and the third-leading wicket-taker of the tournament, taking 20 wickets. Bumrah defended 12 runs in a super over in a match against the Gujarat Lions at Rajkot. In the second qualifier match against Kolkata Knight Riders, at Bengaluru, Bumrah finished with figures of 3/7, the second-best bowling figures for the Mumbai Indians that season. In the final against Rising Pune Supergiant at Hyderabad, Bumrah took two wickets, including the wicket of MS Dhoni, and helped the team lift the trophy.

Let me go on record and say that he [Jasprit Bumrah] is the best bowler in the world at this stage and the best is yet to come hopefully.

— Sachin Tendulkar, after Bumrah's performance in the 2019 IPL Final

Bumrah began his 2018 IPL campaign with a single dismissal in the first match against the Chennai Super Kings, finishing with figures of 1/37. His best performance came in the match against the Kings XI Punjab, where he took 3 wickets for 15 runs at an economy rate of 3.75 runs per over, for which he was named player of the match. In the match against RCB in Mumbai, he took his 50th wicket of his IPL career, dismissing Chris Woakes. Bumrah took 17 wickets in the season, making him the second leading wicket-taker for Mumbai, behind Hardik Pandya. In the 2019 season of the IPL, Bumrah suffered a shoulder injury in the first match against Delhi Capitals. However, he was declared fit the next day and continued to play for the rest of the season. In the match against RCB, he was awarded the player of the match for taking 3 wickets for 20 runs. In the final against Chennai Super Kings at Uppal stadium, Bumrah conceded 14 runs, took two wickets (Ambati Rayudu and Dwayne Bravo), and was awarded the player of the match. Following his performance in the final, Sachin Tendulkar called him the best bowler in the world. He finished the season as the leading wicket-taker for the Mumbai Indians, taking 19 wickets in 16 matches at an average of 21.52 and an economy rate of 6.63 runs per over.

In the 2020 IPL, which was postponed due to the COVID-19 pandemic, Bumrah took his highest number of wickets in a season, with 27 wickets, making him the highest wicket-taker for the Mumbai Indians and the second-highest wicket-taker of the season behind Kagiso Rabada of Delhi Capitals. He took two four-wicket hauls in the season. During the match against RCB at Abu Dhabi, he became the 16th bowler to pick 100 wickets in the IPL with the wicket of Virat Kohli. In the qualifier against Delhi Capitals, he took 4 wickets for 14 runs and won the player of the match award. Bumrah was once again the leading wicket-taker for his team in the 2021 season with 21 wickets in 14 matches and was the third-highest wicket-taker of the season. On 19 September 2021, in the match against CSK, Bumrah played in his 100th IPL match. In the 2022 season, Bumrah took 15 wickets in 14 matches at an average of 25.53 and an economy rate of 7.18, making him the highest wicket-taker for Mumbai. He took a five-wicket haul during the match against Kolkata Knight Riders in Navi Mumbai, finishing with figures of 5/10, the best figures of his IPL career. Bumrah was ruled out of the 2023 season of the IPL due to a back injury.

Bumrah took his 150th IPL wicket, dismissing Abhishek Porel, during the 2024 season in the match against DC. In the match against RCB, he achieved his second five-wicket haul, finishing with figures of 5/21. Bumrah ended the season with a total of 20 wickets, making him the third-highest wicket-taker of the tournament.

== Bowling style ==
Bumrah gained prominence with his unorthodox action and hyperextended elbows. His run-up is short, the first part of which consists of small, stuttering strides. He has an anomalous, stiff-armed action yet generates high pace, and his unusual point of release makes it difficult for batters to read his bowling. Accordingly, the Indian team often uses him in powerplay and death overs. He bowls outside the off-stump, yorkers and short length balls frequently. According to former international bowler Shoaib Akhtar, Bumrah's bowling action has the potential to cause back injuries. Bumrah's front-on bowling action means that bowlers like him generate speed primarily from their shoulders and back, increasing the risk of injury. As a result, the Indian team management has highlighted the importance of his workload management.

I think Jasprit Bumrah is very, very interesting. He runs off a very short run-up. He jogs and then bowls with a very short run. He has straight arms. His bowling is not textbook by any means, but it works. He is very different from other pace bowlers, which reminds me of another fast bowler of my era, who was very different from everyone else – Jeff Thomson.

— Former Australian fast bowler Dennis Lillee, December 2018

Bumrah targets the stumps more often than any other bowler who bowls at his pace, nearly 141 kilometres per hour (88 mph). He bowls nearly 43% of his deliveries on a good line and length. He has the highest average pace among bowlers who hit the good line and length at least as frequently. Additionally, he utilises lateral movement of the ball in his deliveries, capable of swinging it both ways and using reverse swing, especially in Indian conditions. He also has a great ability to bowl yorkers in death overs.

Bumrah's hyper-extended right elbow allows him to release the ball from beyond the bowling crease, creating the illusion of increased speed by reducing the ball's travel distance by nearly half a meter. This hyperextension also enables him to impart an extraordinary amount of backspin on the ball, which produces lift towards the batter (see Magnus effect). His slower variation, the off cutter, has dismissed many batters over the years. Its effectiveness stems from his ability to reverse the lift by imparting enough revolutions on the ball in the opposite direction, causing the ball to dip which makes it land slightly earlier. Another notable skill is his ability to hit various lengths without significantly altering his release point, making it difficult for batters to pick the length from his hand. Additionally, his beyond-the-perpendicular release point allows him to angle the ball into right-handed batters and away from left-handers from over the wicket.

Bumrah has earned a reputation for his late-swinging yorker, which he says he learned by practising with a tennis ball. Bumrah has grown into an asset for the Indian team in the limited-overs format. He is considered one of the fastest Indian bowlers, with an average speed of 142 km/h and his fastest recorded speed being 153 km/h, which was recorded during the first Test match of the India Tour of Australia 2018 at the Adelaide Oval, outpacing Mitchell Starc and Pat Cummins.

"My all-time favourite bowlers are Mitchell Johnson, Wasim Akram and Brett Lee. I used to watch their videos and learn from them. I have learnt a lot from Johnson, and Malinga too. I try to learn from any senior bowlers who have played international cricket."

— Bumrah

Mumbai Indians bowling coach and former New Zealand fast bowler Shane Bond said: "Boom's action, though unique, is repeatable. He has great control." Former Indian fast bowler Ashish Nehra also commented on Bumrah's bowling action, stating, "What you do in 75–80% of your run-up, nothing matters. It's the last 15–20%, the last four-five steps, which is the main thing. That is bowling. Bumrah runs differently, but in his last three-four steps – he is loading, front leg, back leg, everything is in alignment, and he is quick through the air."

== Outside cricket ==
=== Personal life ===
On 15 March 2021, Bumrah married model and presenter Sanjana Ganesan in Goa. Hailing from Pune, Maharashtra, Ganesan is a former Miss India finalist and was also a participant in MTV's Splitsvilla in 2014. Bumrah and Ganesan first met in an interview during the 2013 Indian Premier League. They became friends after that first meeting, and after dating for two years, they married in 2021. On 4 September 2023, their son Angad was born.

=== Public image ===
According to Forbes India, in August 2023 Bumrah had around 25 million followers on social media, including over 10 million on Instagram, which is the highest social media following among bowlers in the world. Financial advisory firm Kroll placed Bumrah in the top 45 most valued celebrities of the country, with an estimated brand value of ₹100 crore (equivalent to ₹116 crore or US$12 million in 2026) in the year 2022. He was the only bowler in the top 50. As of August 2023, he charges in the range of ₹1.5 to ₹2 crore a day for an endorsement. His brand value is estimated to increase by 25 to 30 per cent in the next 12 months. Forbes India included Bumrah in its Celebrity 100 list in 2018 and 2019.

== Critical acclaim ==
Bumrah is regarded by many as one of the world's best all-format pace bowlers in modern cricket. He has received praise from numerous former cricketers, analysts, commentators, current players, and fans for his exceptional fast bowling skills, accuracy, and performance. Bumrah's unorthodox action and multi-format dominance have drawn particular biomechanical analysis and psychological commentary from former greats. Sir Vivian Richards, who dominated the most fearsome fast bowlers of the 1970s and 1980s without the protection of a helmet, categorically stated: "I would prefer to face Dennis Lillee rather than Bumrah". New Zealand legend Sir Richard Hadlee described him as "a shoulder or strength bowler" whose power comes entirely from the final explosive release, warning that "it would be very difficult to coach his technique" and that he suspects Bumrah "could be more vulnerable to injury problems than those fast bowlers with more classical… actions." Famed for his own silken, effortless "Whispering Death" run-up, Michael Holding expressed astonishment at the sheer physical exertion required by Bumrah's methodology. Observing Bumrah's capacity to consistently "hit the deck hard," Holding warned that "it's a human body and not a machine," questioning how long any bowler could sustain such a high-impact, short-run-up routine. Former England captain Michael Atherton admitted he was "glad that he wasn't in my era. He looks a nightmare to face."

Contemporary batters echo the sentiment. Steve Smith called him the "complete package as bowler," noting "from the start of his run-up, it's just all awkward… He releases the ball closer to you than any other bowler… it rushes you a bit more than you think." Alastair Cook confessed, "I stayed up all night watching him bowl. I can't keep my eyes off him." England captain Ben Stokes, after being yorked, simply said, "Sometimes you just have to hold your hands up and say, what a player!" Bumrah's tactical mastery has also been praised. Shane Warne labelled one 2021 spell "the spell of the summer so far… a class above any other fast bowler… on a flat wicket."

Notably, Pakistan's legendary fast bowler Wasim Akram explicitly described him as the "best bowler in the world," emphasising his ability to execute yorkers and perform under pressure. Other legendary fast bowlers, including Andy Roberts, Curtly Ambrose, Ian Bishop, and Waqar Younis, have lauded his unique action, impact, precision, and psychological dominance over batters. According to Aakash Chopra, Waqar Younis stated during a conversation: "Bumrah is better than all of us… We didn't have this thinking level at his age. His skill is better, his thinking is better. He is the best that the world has ever seen." Lasith Malinga, Matthew Hayden and Dale Steyn have also commended Bumrah for his mastery of yorkers and his adaptability across different conditions. Indian cricket figures such as Sachin Tendulkar, Irfan Pathan, Ravi Shastri, and Sunil Gavaskar have highlighted his consistency and leadership in India's bowling attack, while Ricky Ponting and commentator Harsha Bhogle have praised his tactical acumen and composure in critical moments of the game. Former Indian captain Kapil Dev has called him "1000 times better" than himself and "the number one bowler in the world". West Indies legend Brian Lara stated that Bumrah "deserves the 'GOAT' (Greatest Of All Times) status". Australian great Michael Clarke described him as "the best fast bowler ever across all three formats… this guy's a freak". After his death-over masterclass and 500th international wicket in the 2026 T20 World Cup semi-final, former England pacemen Stuart Broad and Steven Finn argued he is "arguably the best quick bowler ever" and "on another planet", while Faf du Plessis likened possessing him to "having a genie". Australian cricket bowling legend Glenn McGrath explicitly acknowledged that his own "fuel tank was bigger than Jasprit's because I did not bowl as quickly as him". Australian captain Pat Cummins identified Bumrah as "India's most influential player," while 2024 T20 World Cup Player of the Tournament winner status prompted England's Harry Brook (post-2026 semi-final) to declare him "arguably the best of all time at the minute." South Africa's Shaun Pollock highlighted his "wonderful wrist position" and rare ability to excel in both powerplay and death overs. India bowling coach Morne Morkel said he was "blown away" by Bumrah's net sessions and called him "the number one bowler in the world."

Following India's successful defence of the T20 World Cup title in the 2026 final against New Zealand, where Bumrah took 4/15 and was named Player of the Match (POTM), further acclaim followed. India captain Suryakumar Yadav described him as "a once-in-a-generation bowler" and a "national treasure", adding that he is "the best in the business". Former England captain Nasser Hussain called him an "absolute genius", stating that India are "virtually unbeatable" with him in the team. Ravichandran Ashwin suggested the term "Bumrahesque" be used with the same pride as "Bradmanesque" and named him Player of the Tournament (POTT), while former captain MS Dhoni publicly hailed him as a "CHAMPION BOWLER".

== Awards ==
Bumrah won the Polly Umrigar Award for best male cricketer for India thrice, in 2018–19, 2021–22, and 2023–24.

Additionally, he received the Dilip Sardesai Award for taking the highest number of wickets in Test cricket in 2018–19.

For his achievements during India's tour of England in 2021, he was selected by Wisden Cricketers' Almanack as one of the five Wisden Cricketers of the Year in its 2022 edition.

Bumrah was conferred with The Times of India TOISA Cricketer of the Year award in 2021.

== Honours ==
=== India ===
- Men's T20 World Cup: 2024, 2026
- Asia Cup: 2016, 2018, 2023, 2025
- Asian Games Gold Medal: 2026

=== Individual ===
- ICC Men's Test Cricketer of the Year: 2024
- Sir Garfield Sobers Trophy (ICC Men's Cricketer of the Year): 2024
- ICC Men's Player of the Month: June 2024 & December 2024
- Wisden Leading Cricketer in the World: 2024
- T20 World Cup Player of the Tournament:2024
