= Ashwani Kumar (scientist) =

Indian biologist

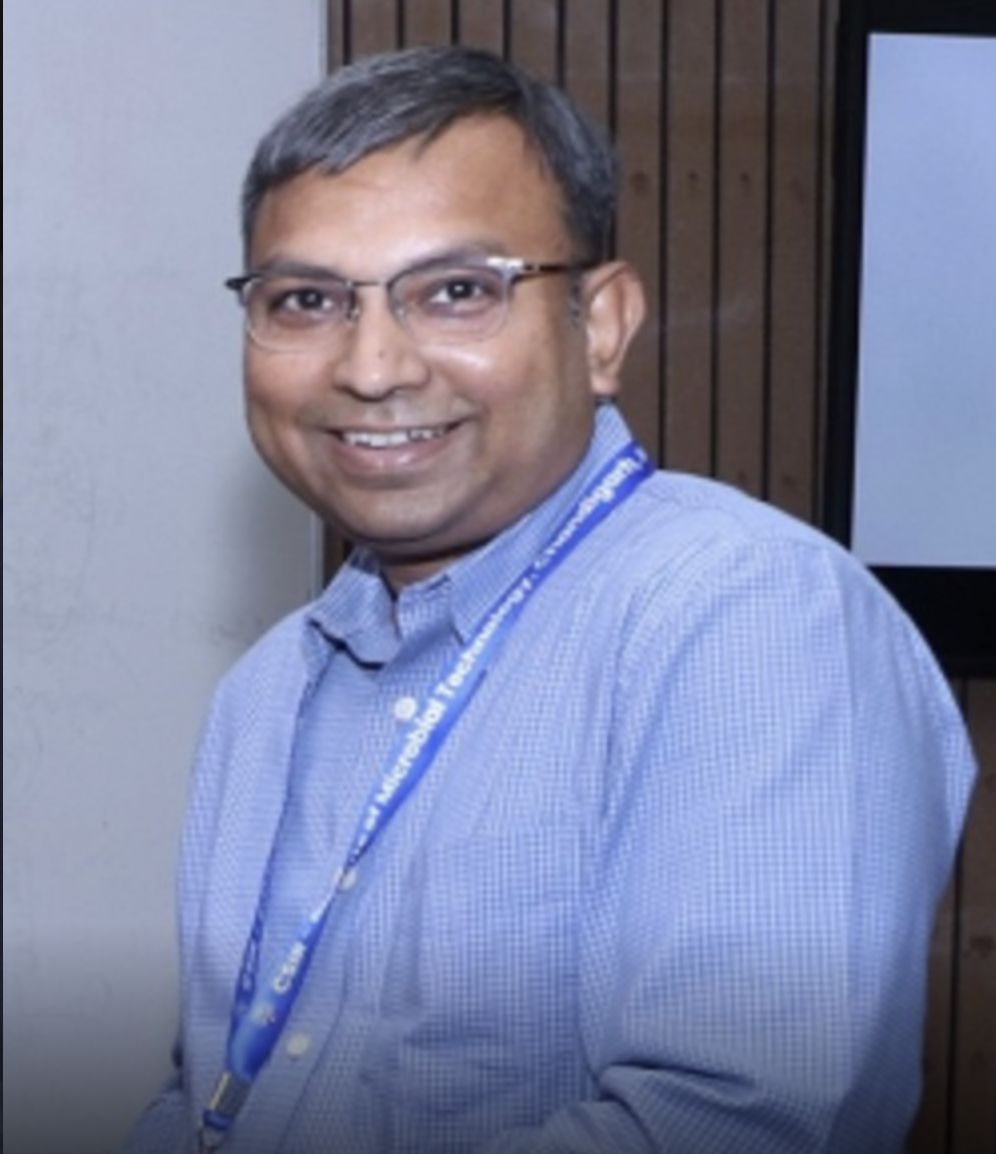
- Born: New Delhi, India
- Education: University of Delhi & University of Alabama at Birmingham
- Known for: Studies on Mycobacterium tuberculosis
- Awards: Shanti Swarup Bhatnagar Prize for Science and Technology 2022. DBT/Wellcome Trust India Alliance Senior Fellowship (2021 to 2026). 2017–18 N-BIOS Prize. 2016 DST Swarnajayanti Fellowship
- Scientific career
- Fields: Mycobacteriology; Biotechnology
- Workplaces: Institute of Microbial Technology
- Doctoral advisor: Prof. Vani Brahmachari and Prof. Mridula Bose

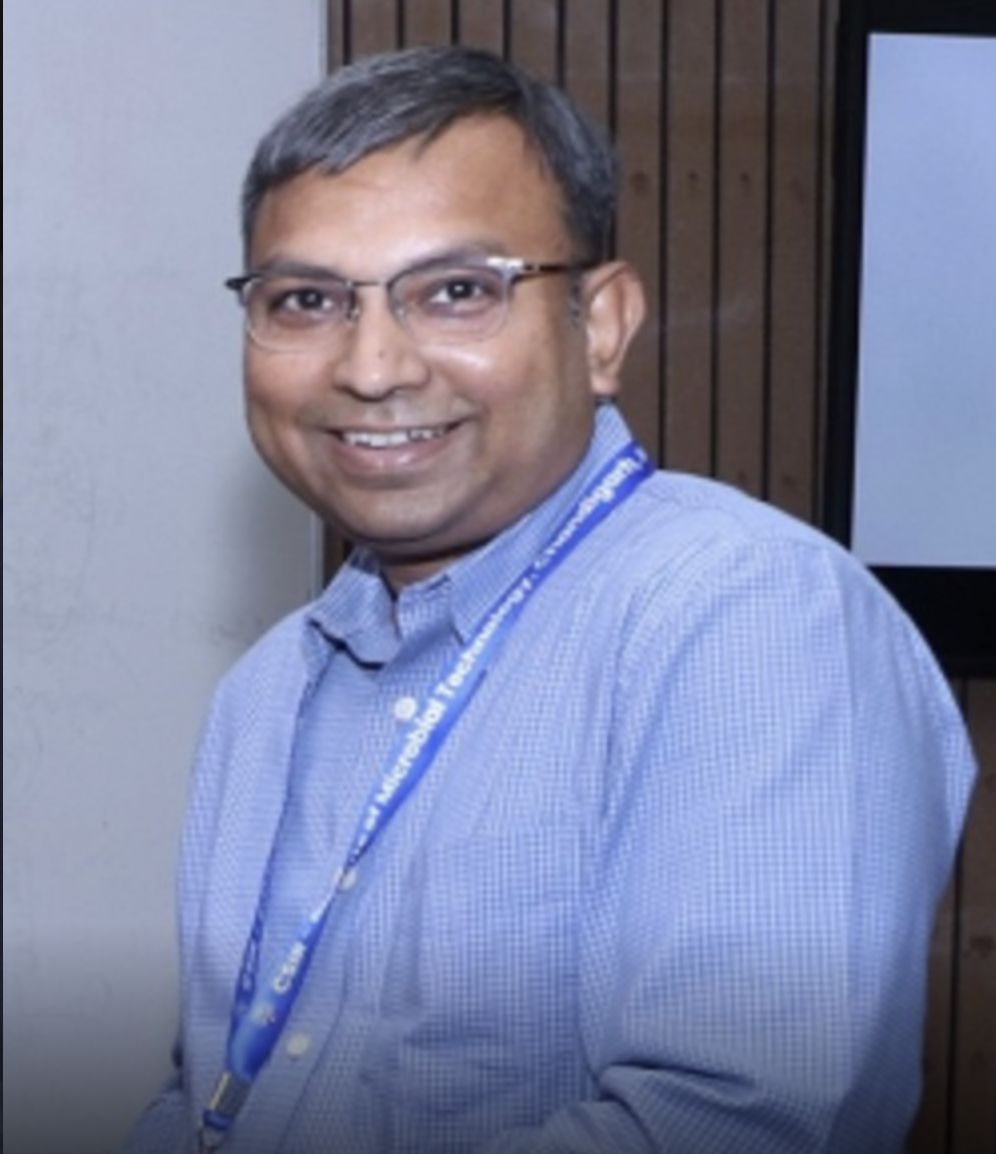
Dr Ashwani Kumar at a talk.

Ashwani Kumar is an Indian microbiologist and the senior principal scientist at the Institute of Microbial Technology (ImTech). He is known for his studies on Mycobacterium tuberculosis, the causative agent of tuberculosis. His laboratory focuses on understanding the reasons for drug tolerance observed in humans. His laboratory hypothesizes that tuberculosis is a biofilm infection, so its treatment needs the administration of multiple drugs for at least six months. The Department of Science and Technology has awarded him Swarnajayanti Fellowship for 2016–2017. Department of Biotechnology has awarded him the National Bioscience Prize (2017-18). He was also selected for DBT/Wellcome Trust India Alliance Senior Fellowship (2021 to 2026). He was elected as a Fellow of the National Academy of Sciences, India, in 2022. For his contributions in tuberculosis pathogenesis, he was awarded with Shanti Swarup Bhatnagar Prize for Science and Technology 2022. He is considered as one of India's Leading Scientist in the field of Tuberculosis and his lab is doing some of the best research in India.

== Biography ==
Ashwani Kumar is a senior principal scientist at the Institute of Microbial Technology (ImTech) where he heads a laboratory, popularly known as Ashwani Kumar's Lab. and serves as a principal investigator. He is known to have done extensive research on Mycobacterium tuberculosis and has served as a member of MDRIpred project, an open source server for predicting inhibitors against drug-tolerant M.tb H37Rv. He has published a number of articles; ResearchGate, an online repository of scientific articles has listed 31 of them. His laboratory has demonstrated the presence of cellulose encased biofilms inside the hosts including human. He also works on regulation of autophagy by signalling gases such as carbon monoxide and hydrogen sulfide. The Department of Biotechnology of the Government of India awarded him the National Bioscience Award for Career Development, one of the highest Indian science awards, for him contributions to biosciences, in 2017–18.

== Selected bibliography ==
=== Articles ===
- Chakraborty, Poushali; Bajeli, Sapna; Kaushal, Deepak; Radotra, Bishan Dass; Kumar, Ashwani (11 March 2021). "Biofilm formation in the lung contributes to virulence and drug tolerance of Mycobacterium tuberculosis". Nature Communications. 12 (1): 1606. Bibcode:2021NatCo..12.1606C. doi:10.1038/s41467-021-21748-6. PMC 7952908. PMID 33707445.
- Iqbal, Iram Khan; Bajeli, Sapna; Sahu, Shivani; Bhat, Shabir Ahmad; Kumar, Ashwani (18 January 2021). "Hydrogen sulfide-induced GAPDH sulfhydration disrupts the CCAR2-SIRT1 interaction to initiate autophagy". Autophagy. 17 (11): 3511–3529. doi:10.1080/15548627.2021.1876342. PMC 8632308. PMID 33459133. S2CID 231636126.
- Kumar, Ashwani (2016-06-23). "House of cellulose – a new hideout for drug tolerant Mycobacterium tuberculosis". Microbial Cell. 3 (7): 299–301. doi:10.15698/mic2016.07.515. ISSN 2311-2638. PMC 5354596. PMID 28357368.
- Kumar, Ashwani; Bhatt, Deepak; Mavi, Parminder Singh; Trivedi, Abhishek (2016-04-25). "Thiol reductive stress induces cellulose-anchored biofilm formation in Mycobacterium tuberculosis". Nature Communications. 7 11392. Bibcode:2016NatCo...711392T. doi:10.1038/ncomms11392. ISSN 2041-1723. PMC 4848537. PMID 27109928.
- Nisha Singh, Pallavi Kansal, Zeeshan Ahmad, Navin Baid, Hariom Kushwaha, Neeraj Khatri, Ashwani Kumar. Antimycobacterial effect of IFNG (interferon gamma)-induced autophagy depends on HMOX1 (heme oxygenase 1)-mediated increase in intracellular calcium levels and modulation of PPP3/calcineurin-TFEB (transcription factor EB) axis. Autophagy. 2018. doi: 10.1080/15548627.2018.1436936.
- Singh, Nisha; Vats, Asheema; Sharma, Aditi; Arora, Amit; Kumar, Ashwani (2017-06-21). "The development of lower respiratory tract microbiome in mice". Microbiome. 5 (1): 61. doi:10.1186/s40168-017-0277-3. ISSN 2049-2618. PMC 5479047. PMID 28637485.
- Nupur, L. N. U.; Vats, Asheema; Dhanda, Sandeep Kumar; Raghava, Gajendra P. S.; Pinnaka, Anil Kumar; Kumar, Ashwani (2016-05-26). "ProCarDB: a database of bacterial carotenoids". BMC Microbiology. 16 (1): 96. doi:10.1186/s12866-016-0715-6. ISSN 1471-2180. PMC 4882832. PMID 27230105.
- Sarkar, Dibyendu; Kumar, Ashwani; Sevalkar, Ritesh Rajesh; Singh, Nisha; Bansal, Roohi; Goyal, Rajni; Kumar, Vijjamarri Anil (2016-09-02). "EspR-dependent ESAT-6 Protein Secretion of Mycobacterium tuberculosis Requires the Presence of Virulence Regulator PhoP". Journal of Biological Chemistry. 291 (36): 19018–19030. doi:10.1074/jbc.M116.746289. ISSN 1083-351X. PMC 5009273. PMID 27445330.

== See also ==
- Carotenoid
- Tissue culture
